= JO1 discography =

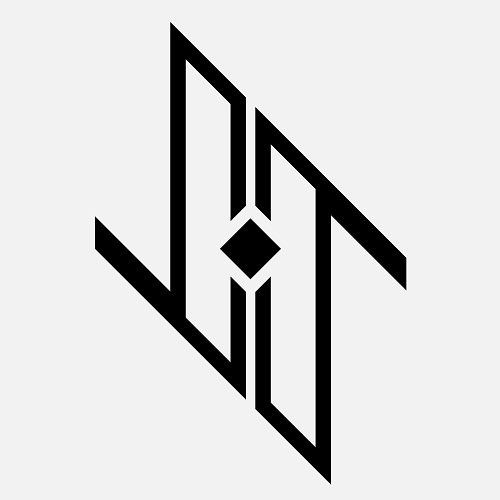
- JO1's logo
- Studio albums: 3
- EPs: 1
- Live albums: 2
- Compilation albums: 1
- Singles: 10
- Promotional singles: 24
- Video albums: 3
- Music videos: 22
- Featured singles: 2
- Soundtrack appearances: 16
- Guest appearances: 3
- Video singles: 1

Japanese boy band JO1 has released three studio albums, one extended play, two live album, one compilation album, three video albums, ten singles, twenty four promotional singles, sixteen soundtrack appearances and twenty two music videos with Lapone Entertainment. Formed through the reality competition show Produce 101 Japan, JO1 debuted in 2020 with the single Protostar and the Japan Hot 100 number-one song "Infinity". The single made the group the seventh Japanese artist to sell a debut single over 300,000 copies in its first week. It was followed by another number-one single Stranger and the group's first studio album, The Star (2020).

In 2021, JO1 continued their streak with three number-one singles—Challenger, Stranger, and Wandering. The latter earned the group's first double platinum certification from the Recording Industry Association of Japan (RIAJ) for shipments exceeding half a million units. The singles were followed by Kizuna (2022), the group's first number-one studio album on the Japan Hot Albums and Oricon Albums Chart. JO1's number-one album streak continued in 2023 with Equinox, which was preceded by the singles Midnight Sun and Tropical Night. In 2024, JO1 released singles Hitchhiker and Where Do We Go; the first marks the group's first triple platinum certification, while its lead track "Love Seeker" earned the group their first streaming certification. To mark their fifth anniversary, JO1 released their first greatest hits album, Be Classic, in 2025. They received more streaming certifications for its title track and their 2022 single "SuperCali". They closed the year by releasing their tenth consecutive Oricon number-one single, Handz in My Pocket. In 2026, JO1 entered the Billboard 200 for the first time with their US debut extended play (EP), Animal.

== Albums ==
=== Studio albums ===
List of studio albums, with selected chart positions, sales figures and certifications
Title	Album details	Peak chart positions			Sales	Certifications
Title	Album details	JPN	JPN Comb.	JPN Hot	Sales	Certifications
The Star	Released: November 25, 2020 (JPN); Label: Lapone Entertainment; Formats: CD, CD+DVD, digital download, streaming	2	2	2	JPN: 197,337 (Note: Japanese cumulative physical and digital sales of The Star as of December 2024)	RIAJ (phy.): Gold
Kizuna	Released: May 25, 2022 (JPN); Label: Lapone Entertainment; Formats: CD, CD+DVD, digital download, streaming	1	1	1	JPN: 287,117 (Note: Japanese cumulative physical and digital sales of Kizuna as of December 2024)	RIAJ (phy.): Platinum
Equinox	Released: September 20, 2023 (JPN); Label: Lapone Entertainment; Formats: CD, CD+DVD, digital download, streaming	1	1	1	JPN: 275,175 (Note: Japanese cumulative physical and digital sales of Equinox as of January 2025)	RIAJ (phy.): Platinum

=== Compilation albums ===
List of compilation albums, with selected chart positions and sales figures
Title	Album details	Peak chart positions			Sales	Certifications
Title	Album details	JPN	JPN Comb.	JPN Hot	Sales	Certifications
Be Classic	Released: April 2, 2025 (JPN); Label: Lapone Entertainment; Formats: CD, CD+DVD, digital download, streaming	1	1	1	JPN: 343,042 (Note: Japanese cumulative physical and digital sales of Be Classic as of September 2025)	RIAJ (phy.): Platinum

=== Live albums ===
List of live albums, with selected chart positions and sales figures
Title	Album details	Peak chart positions	Sales
Title	Album details	JPN Hot	Sales
2023 JO1 2nd Arena Live Tour "Beyond the Dark – Rise in Kyocera Dome"	Released: November 6, 2024 (JPN); Label: Lapone Entertainment; Formats: Digital download, streaming	34	JPN: 535 (dig.)
JO1nder Show 2025 "Wherever We Are" in Tokyo Dome	Released: January 21, 2026 (JPN); Label: Lapone Entertainment; Formats: Digital download, streaming	66	JPN: 342 (dig.)

== Extended plays ==
List of extended plays
Title	Album details	Peak chart positions			Sales
Title	Album details	JPN Comb.	US	US Indie	Sales
Animal	Released: October 2, 2026 (US); Label: Lapone Entertainment; Formats: CD, digital download, streaming	16	139	15	JPN: 2,735 (dig.)

== Singles ==
=== As a lead artist ===
List of singles as lead artist, with selected chart positions and certifications, showing year released and album name
Title (Note: A maxi single release that has a different title from any songs in it will be considered as an "EP single" with its title being italicized. Its respective lead track is categorized under promotional single.)	Year	Peak chart positions		Sales	Certifications	Album
Title	Year	JPN	JPN Comb.	Sales	Certifications	Album
Protostar	2020	1	1	JPN: 400,011 (phy.) (Note: Japanese physical sales of Protostar as of January 2025)	RIAJ (phy.): Platinum	The Star
Stargazer	2020	1	1	JPN: 338,257 (Note: Japanese cumulative physical and digital sales of Stargazer as of May 2025)	RIAJ (phy.): Platinum	The Star
Challenger	2021	1	1	JPN: 326,102 (Note: Japanese cumulative physical and digital sales of Challenger as of January 2025)	RIAJ (phy.): Platinum	Kizuna
Stranger	2021	1	1	JPN: 371,201 (Note: Japanese cumulative physical and digital sales of Stranger as of December 2024)	RIAJ (phy.): Platinum	Kizuna
Wandering	2021	1	1	JPN: 460,617 (Note: Japanese cumulative physical and digital sales of Wandering as of as of May 2025)	RIAJ (phy.): 2× Platinum	Kizuna
Midnight Sun	2022	1	1	JPN: 539,067 (phy.)	RIAJ (phy.): 2× Platinum	Equinox
Tropical Night	2023	1	1	JPN: 338,556 (Note: Japanese cumulative physical and digital sales of Tropical Night as of May 2025)	RIAJ (phy.): 2× Platinum	Equinox
Hitchhiker	2024	1	1	JPN: 549,810 (Note: Japanese cumulative physical and digital sales of Hitchhiker as of January 2026)	RIAJ (phy.): 3× Platinum	Be Classic
Where Do We Go	2024	1	1	JPN: 591,878 (Note: Japanese cumulative physical and digital sales of Where Do We Go as of January 2026)	RIAJ (phy.): 3× Platinum	Be Classic
Handz in My Pocket	2025	1	1	JPN: 585,768 (Note: Japanese cumulative physical and digital sales of Handz in My Pocket as of January 2026)	RIAJ (phy.): 3× Platinum	Non-album single
AAO	2026	TBA		JPN: 433,146	TBA	Non-album single

=== As a featured artist ===
List of singles as a featured artist, with selected chart positions, showing year released and album name
Title	Year	Peak chart positions			Sales	Certifications	Album
Title	Year	JPN	JPN Comb.	JPN Hot	Sales	Certifications	Album
"Love All Star" (JO1, INI, DXTeen)	2024	—	— (Note: "Love All Star" did not enter the Combined Singles Chart, but appeared at number 41 on the download component chart.)	— (Note: "Love All Star" did not enter the Hot 100, but appeared at number 44 on the download component chart.)	JPN: 1,382 (dig.)	—N/a	Non-album singles
"Keshiki" (景色) (as part of JI Blue)	2026	1	1	1	JPN: 288,415 (phy.)	RIAJ (phy.): Platinum	Non-album singles
"—" denotes releases that did not chart or were not released in that region.

=== Promotional singles ===
List of promotional singles, with selected chart positions, showing year released and album name
Title	Year	Peak chart positions		Sales	Certifications	Album
Title	Year	JPN Comb.	JPN Hot	Sales	Certifications	Album
"Infinity" (無限大)	2020	1	1	JPN: 6,162 (dig.)	—N/a	Protostar (single) / The Star
"Oh-Eh-Oh"	2020	1	1	JPN: 4,443 (dig.)	—N/a	Stargazer (single) / The Star
"Shine a Light"	2020	—	58	—N/a	—N/a	The Star
"Born to Be Wild"	2021	1	1	—N/a	—N/a	Challenger (single) / Kizuna
"Real"	2021	1	1	—N/a	—N/a	Stranger (single) / Kizuna
"Run&Go"	2021	—	— (Note: "Run&Go" did not enter the Hot 100, but appeared at number 64 on the download component chart.)	—N/a	—N/a	Wandering (single)
"Bokura no Kisetsu" (僕らの季節)	2021	1	1	JPN: 12,143 (dig.)	—N/a	Wandering (single) / Kizuna
"YOLO-konde"	2022	— (Note: "YOLO-konde" did not enter the Combined Singles Chart, but appeared at number 16 on the download component chart.)	54	JPN: 3,053 (dig.)	—N/a	Be Classic
"With Us"	2022	15	17	JPN: 2,895 (dig.)	—N/a	Kizuna
"SuperCali"	2022	1	2	JPN: 19,331 (dig.)	RIAJ: Gold (st.)	Midnight Sun (single) / Equinox
"Tiger"	2023	1	1	JPN: 12,593 (dig.)	—N/a	Tropical Night (single) / Equinox
"Radiovision"	2023	— (Note: "Radiovision" did not enter the Combined Singles Chart, but appeared at number 25 on the download component chart.)	— (Note: "Radiovision" did not enter the Hot 100, but appeared at number 27 on the download component chart.)	JPN: 2,081 (dig.)	—N/a	Equinox
"Venus"	2023	36	30	JPN: 8,622 (dig.)	—N/a	Equinox
"Eyes on Me" (featuring R3hab)	2023	— (Note: "Eyes on Me" did not enter the Combined Singles Chart, but appeared at number 20 on the download component chart.)	— (Note: "Eyes on Me" did not enter the Hot 100, but appeared at number 17 on the download component chart.)	JPN: 2,222 (dig.)	—N/a	Non-album singles
"Wow War Tonight" (JO1 ver.) (Note: A cover of H Jungle with t's song)	2024	— (Note: "Wow War Tonight" (JO1 ver.) did not enter the Combined Singles Chart, but appeared at number 43 on the download component chart.)	— (Note: "Wow War Tonight" (JO1 ver.) did not enter the Hot 100, but appeared at number 44 on the download component chart.)	JPN: 1,195 (dig.)	—N/a	Non-album singles
"Happy Unbirthday"	2024	— (Note: "Happy Unbirthday" did not enter the Combined Singles Chart, but appeared at number 6 on the download component chart.)	72	JPN: 4,473 (dig.)	—N/a	Be Classic
"Love Seeker"	2024	1	1	JPN: 31,855 (dig.)	RIAJ: Gold (st.)	Hitchhiker (single)
"Where Do We Go"	2024	1	1	JPN: 14,697 (dig.)	—N/a	Where Do We Go (single)
"Join Us!!"	2025	— (Note: "Join Us!!" did not enter the Combined Singles Chart, but appeared at number 3 on the download component chart.)	70	JPN: 5,779 (dig.)	—N/a	Be Classic
"Be Classic"	2025	10	11	JPN: 17,495 (dig.)	RIAJ: Gold (st.)	Be Classic
"Handz in My Pocket"	2025	1	2	JPN: 17,796 (dig.)	—N/a	Handz in My Pocket (single)
"To Santa" (サンタさんへ。)	2025	— (Note: "To Santa" did not enter the Combined Singles Chart, but appeared at number 6 on the download component chart.)	94	JPN: 7,786 (dig.)	—N/a	Non-album single
"Whatcha Doin"	2026	49	45	JPN: 3,802 (dig.)	—N/a	Animal
"Animal"	2026	51	46	JPN: 4,881 (dig.)	—N/a	Animal
"—" denotes releases that did not chart or were not released in that region.

== Soundtrack appearances ==
List of soundtrack appearances with selected chart positions and year released, showing media title and album name
Title	Year	Peak chart positions		Sales	Media	Album
Title	Year	JPN Comb.	JPN Hot	Sales	Media	Album
"Dreaming Night"	2021	— (Note: "Dreaming Night" did not enter the Combined Singles Chart, but appeared at number 30 on the download component chart.)	85	JPN: 2,900 (dig.)	Love Phantom	Stranger (single)
"Prologue"	2021	— (Note: "Prologue" did not enter the Combined Singles Chart, but appeared at number 24 on the download component chart.)	49	JPN: 2,979 (dig.)	Boruto: Naruto Next Generations	Wandering (single) / Kizuna
"Dreamer"	2022	32	35	JPN: 2,802 (dig.)	Short Program	Kizuna
"Toberu Kara" (飛べるから)	2022	43	42	JPN: 2,574 (dig.)	JO1 the Movie: Unfinished - Go to the Top	Be Classic
"Move the Soul"	2022	16	19	—N/a	Fanfare of Adolescence	Kizuna
"We Good"	2023	— (Note: "We Good" did not enter the Combined Singles Chart, but appeared at number 22 on the download component chart.)	66	JPN: 2,307 (dig.)	Our Little Love Story	Tropical Night (single)
"Romance"	2023	— (Note: "Romance" did not enter the Combined Singles Chart, but appeared at number 10 on the download component chart.)	71	JPN: 2,894 (dig.)	Blue Birthday	Tropical Night (single)
"NEWSmile"	2023	— (Note: "NEWSmile" did not enter the Combined Singles Chart, but appeared at number 12 on the download component chart.)	58	JPN: 4,805 (dig.)	Mezamashi 8	Equinox
"Gradation"	2023	— (Note: "Gradation" did not enter the Combined Singles Chart, but appeared at number 25 on the download component chart.)	— (Note: "Gradation" did not enter the Hot 100, but appeared at number 26 on the download component chart.)	JPN: 2,001 (dig.)	You Made My Dawn	Equinox
"Hideout"	2023	— (Note: "Hideout" did not enter the Combined Singles Chart, but appeared at number 17 on the download component chart.)	— (Note: "Hideout" did not enter the Hot 100, but appeared at number 25 on the download component chart.)	JPN: 2,593 (dig.)	Out	Non-album singles
"Your Key"	2024	— (Note: "Your Key" did not enter the Combined Singles Chart, but appeared at number 5 on the download component chart.)	60	JPN: 6,318 (dig.)	Four Knights of the Apocalypse	Non-album singles
"Believe in You"	2024	— (Note: "Believe in You" did not enter the Combined Singles Chart, but appeared at number 27 on the download component chart.)	— (Note: "Believe in You" did not enter the Hot 100, but appeared at number 24 on the download component chart.)	JPN: 4,303 (dig.)	Run for Money the Movie: Tokyo Mission	Where Do We Go (single)
"Be Brave!"	2025	— (Note: "Be Brave!" did not enter the Combined Singles Chart, but appeared at number 2 on the download component chart.)	99	JPN: 4,995 (dig.)	Bad Boys: The Movie	Non-album single
"Bon Voyage"	2025	— (Note: "Bon Voyage" did not enter the Combined Singles Chart, but appeared at number 32 on the download component chart.)	— (Note: "Bon Voyage" did not enter the Hot 100, but appeared at number 41 on the download component chart.)	JPN: 1,290 (dig.)	JO1 the Movie: Mikansei - Bon Voyage	Be Classic
"Hiraku" (ひらく)	2025	38	38	JPN: 8,196 (dig.)	Mt. Fuji, Coffee, and the Formula for Happiness	Non-album single
"Ignite"	2026	26	17	JPN: 18,293 (dig.)	Tokyo Revengers	AAO (single)
"—" denotes releases that did not chart or were not released in that region.

== Other charted songs ==
List of other charted songs, with selected chart positions and certifications, showing year released and album name
Title	Year	Peak chart positions		Sales	Album
Title	Year	JPN Comb.	JPN Hot	Sales	Album
"Running"	2020	—	37	—N/a	Protostar (single) / The Star
"La Pa Pa Pam"	2020	—	40	—N/a	Protostar (single) / The Star
"Young" (JO1 version)	2020	—	49	—N/a	Protostar (single) / The Star
"GrandMaster" (JO1 version)	2020	—	55	—N/a	Protostar (single) / The Star
"Tsukame (It's Coming)" (JO1 version)	2020	—	65	—N/a	Protostar (single) / The Star
"So What"	2020	—	68	—N/a	Stargazer (single) / The Star
"Go"	2020	—	76	—N/a	Stargazer (single) / The Star
"Voice" (君の声)	2020	—	84	—N/a	Stargazer (single) / The Star
"KungChiKiTa" (JO1 version)	2020	—	85	—N/a	Stargazer (single) / The Star
"My Friends"	2020	—	90	—N/a	Stargazer (single) / The Star
"Tsutaerareru Nara" (伝えられるなら)	2021	—	78	JPN: 3,645 (dig.)	Challenger (single)
"Freedom"	2021	—	82	—N/a	Stranger (single)
"Icarus"	2021	—	97	—N/a	Stranger (single)
"We Alright"	2021	—	77	—N/a	Wandering (single)
"Walk It Like I Talk It"	2022	49	51	—N/a	Kizuna
"All Hours"	2022	— (Note: "All Hours" did not enter the Combined Singles Chart, but appeared at number 28 on the download component chart.)	67	JPN: 1,817 (dig.)	Non-album song
"Aqua"	2024	48	45	JPN: 6,769 (dig.)	Hitchhiker (single)
"Breezy Love"	2026	—	48	JPN: 7,273 (dig.)	Non-album song
"Eien"	2026	36	32	JPN: 7,773 (dig.)	Non-album song
"Sakura"	2026	—	87	JPN: 1,556 (dig.)	Animal
"—" denotes releases that did not chart or were not released in that region.

== Guest appearances ==
List of non-single guest appearances, showing year released, other performing artists, and album name
Title	Year	Other artist(s)	Album
"Let Me Blow Ya Mind"	2025	Eve	Kpopped (Apple TV+ Original Series Soundtrack)
"Joyride"	2025	Kesha	Kpopped (Apple TV+ Original Series Soundtrack)
"Wanna Buy A Plant + Cost Me"	2026	Anderson .Paak	K-POPS! (Music from and inspired by K-POPS! Motion Picture)

== Videography ==
=== Music videos ===
List of music videos, showing year released and directors
Title	Year	Director(s)	Ref.
"Infinity" (無限大)	2020	Beomjin (VM Project Architecture)	
"Oh-Eh-Oh"	2020	Hidenobu Tanabe	
"Shine a Light"	2020	Yasuhiro Arafune	
"Born to Be Wild"	2021	Seo Dong-hyeok (Flipevil)	
"Real"	2021	Ryohei Shingu	
"Bokura no Kisetsu" (僕らの季節)	2021	Hidejin Kato	
"Dreamer"	2022	Unknown	
"Toberu Kara" (飛べるから)	2022	Tetsurō Inagaki	
"With Us"	2022	Ryohei Shingu	
"SuperCali"	2022	Naokazu Mitsuishi	
"Tiger"	2023	Jeon Ji-hoon (725)	
"NEWSmile"	2023	Kim Ha-neul	
"Radiovision"	2023	Lee In-hoon (Segaji Video)	
"Venus"	2023	Jeon Ji-hoon (725)	
"Eyes on Me"	2023	Cody Burkhardt	
"Your Key"	2024	Naokazu Mitsuishi	
"Love Seeker"	2024	Kim In-tae	
"Where Do We Go"	2024	Kim In-tae	
"Be Classic"	2025	Sam Son (High Quality Fish)	
"Handz in My Pocket"	2025	Jan Lee	
"Whatcha Doin'"	2026	Yuann	
"Animal"	2026	G2 Yuki Tsujimoto	
"Ignite"	2026	Kwon Yong-soo	

=== Video albums ===
List of video albums, with selected chart positions and sales figures
Title	Release details	Peak chart positions	Sales (Note: Sales figures for video albums include DVD and Blu-ray.)
Title	Release details	JPN Music	Sales
2022 JO1 1st Arena Tour "Kizuna"	Released: March 15, 2023 (JPN); Label: Lapone Entertainment; Formats: DVD, Blu-ray	1	JPN: 56,330
2023 JO1 2nd Arena Live Tour "Beyond the Dark – Rise in Kyocera Dome"	Released: November 6, 2024 (JPN); Label: Lapone Entertainment; Formats: DVD, Blu-ray	1	JPN: 27,738
JO1nder Show 2025 "Wherever We Are" in Tokyo Dome	Released: January 21, 2026 (JPN); Label: Lapone Entertainment; Formats: DVD, Blu-ray	1	JPN: 32,963

=== Video singles ===
List of video singles, with selected chart positions, sales figures and certifications
Title	Release details	Peak chart positions	Sales	Certifications
Title	Release details	JPN Music	Sales	Certifications
"Your Key"	Released: March 27, 2024 (JPN); Label: Lapone Entertainment; Formats: Blu-ray, CD	1	JPN: 95,901 (phy.)	RIAJ: Gold
