= List of JO1 live performances =

JO1 live performances
- Concert tours: 3
- One-off concerts: 4
- Joint concerts and music festivals: 43
- Awards ceremonies: 13
- Television shows and specials: 33
- Other live performances: 9

Japanese boy band JO1 has performed on three concert tours, four one-off concerts, forty-three music festivals, thirteen awards ceremonies, and forty-two live events. Debuting in March 2020, during the start of lockdown in Japan due to the COVID-19 pandemic, JO1 promoted their first studio album with two virtual concerts and held their first concert with a live audience, Open the Door, in November 2021. The group embarked on their first arena tour, Kizuna, in September 2022. They did another arena tour and their first Asia tour in the later half of 2023, with an encore performance in Kyocera Dome.

Managed by Lapone Entertainment, a joint venture between CJ ENM and Yoshimoto Kogyo, JO1 is a regular act in CJ ENM's K-pop music festival, KCON. The group has performed in various award ceremonies and television specials, in which they collaborated with other artists, such as Yuto of Pentagon and Akiko Wada. In 2022, JO1 made their debut appearance on NHK's New Year's Eve television special, Kōhaku Uta Gassen, and became the first artist to perform from the white team the next year.

== Concert tours ==
List of concert tours, showing dates, associated album(s), number of shows, and attendance
| Title | Dates | Associated album(s) | Continent(s) | Shows | Attendance | Ref. |
|---|---|---|---|---|---|---|
| Kizuna Arena Tour | September 3–October 23, 2022 | Kizuna | Asia | 13 | 110,000 | |
| Beyond the Dark Tour | August 5–December 8, 2023 | Equinox | Asia | 19 | 200,000 (Note: Japan concerts only) | |
| Wherever We Are | November 23, 2024–April 21, 2025 | Where Do We Go; Be Classic | Asia; North America | 24 | 250,000 | |
| Eien Dome Tour | April 8–July 20, 2026 | Be Classic | Asia | 6 | 70,000 | |
| Animal Tour | October 2–October 11, 2026 | Animal | North America | 5 | TBA | |

== One-off concerts ==
List of one-off concerts, showing event names, dates, cities, countries, venues and attendance
| Event name | Date | City | Country | Venue | Attendance | Setlist | Ref. |
|---|---|---|---|---|---|---|---|
| Open the Door | November 19, 2021 | Chiba | Japan | Makuhari Messe | 45,000 | Setlist: 1. "Born to be Wild"; 2. "Oh-Eh-Oh"; 3. "Go"; 4. "Safety Zone"; 5. "Design"; 6. "Speed of Light"; 7. "Never Ending Story"; 8. "Tsutaerareru Nara" / "Running" / "Monstar"; 9. "Freedom"; 10. "Dreaming Night"; 11. "Blooming Again"; 12. "Icarus"; 13. "Shine a Light"; 14. "Run&Go"; 15. "Tsukame (It's Coming)"; 16. "Bokura no Kisetsu"; Encore: 1. "Prologue"; 2. "Real" | |
| Open the Door | November 20, 2021 (two shows) | Chiba | Japan | Makuhari Messe | 45,000 | Setlist: 1. "Born to be Wild"; 2. "Oh-Eh-Oh"; 3. "Go"; 4. "Safety Zone"; 5. "Design"; 6. "Speed of Light"; 7. "Never Ending Story"; 8. "Tsutaerareru Nara" / "Running" / "Monstar"; 9. "Freedom"; 10. "Dreaming Night"; 11. "Blooming Again"; 12. "Icarus"; 13. "Shine a Light"; 14. "Run&Go"; 15. "Tsukame (It's Coming)"; 16. "Bokura no Kisetsu"; Encore: 1. "Prologue"; 2. "Real" | |
| Open the Door | November 19, 2021 (two shows) | Chiba | Japan | Makuhari Messe | 45,000 | Setlist: 1. "Born to be Wild"; 2. "Oh-Eh-Oh"; 3. "Go"; 4. "Safety Zone"; 5. "Design"; 6. "Speed of Light"; 7. "Never Ending Story"; 8. "Tsutaerareru Nara" / "Running" / "Monstar"; 9. "Freedom"; 10. "Dreaming Night"; 11. "Blooming Again"; 12. "Icarus"; 13. "Shine a Light"; 14. "Run&Go"; 15. "Tsukame (It's Coming)"; 16. "Bokura no Kisetsu"; Encore: 1. "Prologue"; 2. "Real" | |
| JO1 5th Anniversary: Matsuri | October 18, 2025 | Tokyo | Japan | Sea Forest Waterway | 30,000 | Setlist: 1. "Infinity 2025"; 2. "Oh-eh-Oh"; 3. "Be Classic"; 4. "Handz in My Pocket"; 5. "Run&Go"; 6. "Stay"; 7. "Shine a Light" / "Dreaming Night" / "Meteor Rain"; 8. "Gradation"; 9. "Hiraku"; Encore: 1. "Happy Jam Jam"; 2. "Bon Voyage" | |
| JO1 5th Anniversary: Matsuri | October 19, 2025 | Tokyo | Japan | Sea Forest Waterway | 30,000 | Setlist: 1. "Infinity 2025"; 2. "Oh-eh-Oh"; 3. "Be Classic"; 4. "Handz in My Pocket"; 5. "Run&Go"; 6. "Stay"; 7. "Shine a Light" / "Dreaming Night" / "Meteor Rain"; 8. "Gradation"; 9. "Hiraku"; Encore: 1. "Happy Jam Jam"; 2. "Bon Voyage" | |

=== Online concerts ===
Due to the COVID pandemic in Japan, JO1 held two online concerts. The first concert, Starlight, also consist of game and talk segments, while the second marks the first time the group used a live band in their concerts.

List of online concerts, showing event names, dates, cities, countries, venues and attendance
| Event name | Date | City | Country | Venue | Attendance | Ref. |
|---|---|---|---|---|---|---|
| Starlight | December 19, 2020 | Yokohama | Japan | Pia Arena MM | 120,000 | |
| Starlight Deluxe | February 20, 2021 | Paju | South Korea | CJ ENM Studio Center | 120,000 | |

== Fan meetings ==
In the summer of 2024, JO1 held a fan meeting titled JAM Thanksgiving to show gratitude to fans who have been supporting the group. The event was held in Yokohama, the venue of their pre-debut fan club-exclusive fan meeting in 2020. A discounted pricing was available for members for the official fan club for both live performance and live streaming. The event consist of a game segment, a problem advice corner, and a reading letters segment among others.

List of fan meetings, showing event names, dates, cities, countries, venues and attendance
| Event name | Date | City | Country | Venue | Attendance | Setlist | Ref. |
|---|---|---|---|---|---|---|---|
| JAM Thanksgiving: Summer Festival | July 27, 2024 | Yokohama | Japan | K-Arena Yokohama | —N/a | Setlist: 1. "Stay"; 2. "Love Seeker"; 3. "Test Drive"; 4. "SuperCali"; 5. "Happy Unbirthday"; 6. "Trigger"; 7. "Lied to You"; 8. "Sugar"; 9. "RadioVision"; 10. "Love & Hate"; 11. "Blooming Again"; Encore: 1. "Believe in You"; 2. "My Friends" | |
| JAM Thanksgiving: Summer Festival | July 28, 2024 | Yokohama | Japan | K-Arena Yokohama | —N/a | Setlist: 1. "Stay"; 2. "Love Seeker"; 3. "Test Drive"; 4. "SuperCali"; 5. "Happy Unbirthday"; 6. "Trigger"; 7. "Lied to You"; 8. "Sugar"; 9. "RadioVision"; 10. "Love & Hate"; 11. "Blooming Again"; Encore: 1. "Believe in You"; 2. "My Friends" | |

== Joint concerts and music festivals ==
List of performances at joint concerts and music festivals, with date, country, venue, and performed songs
| Date | Event | City | Country | Venue | Performed song(s) | Ref. |
|---|---|---|---|---|---|---|
| June 21, 2020 | KCON:TACT 2020 Summer (Note: Performed remotely from Japan) | Paju | South Korea | CJ ENM Studio Center | "Infinity", "La Pa Pa Pam", "Tsukame (It's Coming)" (JO1 ver.) | |
| October 17, 2020 | KCON:TACT Season 2 | Paju | South Korea | CJ ENM Studio Center | "Oh-Eh-Oh", "Go" and "So What", "Infinity", "My Friends" | |
| March 25, 2021 | KCON:TACT 3 | Paju | South Korea | CJ ENM Studio Center | "Shine A Light", "Monstar", "Tsutaerareru Nara", "Born to be Wild" | |
| June 25, 2021 | KCON:TACT 4U | Paju | South Korea | CJ ENM Studio Center | "Born to be Wild", "Speed of Light", "Design", "Dreaming Night" | |
| August 14, 2021 | Odaiba 2021 Virtual Adventure Island | Tokyo | Japan | Unknown | "Born to be Wild", "Design, "Icarus", "Dreaming Night", "Real" | |
| September 23, 2021 | KCON World Premiere: The Triangle | Yokohama | Japan | Pacifico Yokohama | "Real", "Freedom", "Blooming Again", "Dreaming Night" | |
| May 14–15, 2022 | KCON 2022 Premiere in Japan | Chiba | Japan | Makuhari Messe | "Move the Soul", "Walk It Like I Talk It", "Dreamer", "With Us", "Back Door" (Orig. Stray Kids), "Shine" with Yuto (Pentagon) | |
| June 5, 2022 | MTV Live Match | Chiba | Japan | Makuhari Messe | "Infinity", "Born to be Wild", "Move the Soul", "Dreaming Night", "Walk It Like I Talk It", "With Us" | |
| August 13, 2022 | Odaiba 2022 Virtual Adventure Island | Tokyo | Japan | Unknown | "Real", "With Us", "Move the Soul", "Walk It Like I Talk It", "Zero" | |
| September 24, 2022 | Venue 101 Extra | Tokyo | Japan | NHK Hall | Unknown | |
| October 15, 2022 | KCON 2022 Japan | Tokyo | Japan | Ariake Arena | "SuperCali" (Korean ver.), "Rose", "With Us" | |
| December 20, 2023 | Asia Emotional Music Fes 2022 | Tokyo | Japan | Ariake Arena | "Rose", "Infinity", "La Pa Pa Pam", "SuperCali", "Phobia", "Dreaming Night", "Happy Merry Christmas" | |
| January 29, 2023 | GMO Sonic 2023 | Saitama | Japan | Saitama Super Arena | "Born to be Wild", "Rose", "Infinity" (EDM ver.), "We Good", "Monstar", "Speed of Light", "SuperCali" | |
| March 16, 2023 | JO1 x INI Special Event in Thailand | Bangkok | Thailand | The Market Bangkok | "SuperCali", "All Hours", "Stay" | |
| March 18, 2023 | KCON 2023 Thailand | Bangkok | Thailand | Impact Arena | "Phobia" (Korean ver.), "Tiger" | |
| April 16, 2023 | Mezamashi TV 30th Anniversary Festival | Yokohama | Japan | Pia Arena MM | "Real", "Infinity", "We Good", "Dreaming Night", "Run & Go", "Tiger", "SuperCali" | |
| May 13, 2023 | KCON 2023 Japan | Chiba | Japan | Makuhari Messe | "Boy with Luv" (Orig. BTS), "Tiger", "We Good", "Comma," | |
| May 27, 2023 | 29th Dream Concert | Busan | South Korea | Busan Asiad Main Stadium | "SuperCali" (Korean ver.), "YOLO-konde", "Trigger" | |
| May 30–31, 2023 | Laposta 2023 | Tokyo | Japan | Ariake Arena | "SuperCali", "Tiger", "Oh-Eh-Oh", "Get Inside Me", "Dreaming Night", "Rose", "Bombarda" (Orig. INI), "Young", "YOLO-konde", "Trigger" (Note: Group performances only) | |
| June 18, 2023 | 2023 Dream Concert in Japan | Saitama | Japan | Saitama Super Arena | "Tiger", "Comma", "Stay", "SuperCali", "Trigger" | |
| August 18, 2023 | KCON LA 2023 | Los Angeles | United States | Crypto.com Arena | "Radiovision", "Trigger", "Super" (Orig. Seventeen) | |
| August 27, 2023 | Odaiba Adventure King 2023 Summer Splash! | Tokyo | Japan | Fuji Television Stadium | "SuperCali", "Infinity", "NEWSmile", "Touch!", "Radiovision", "Trigger", "Get Inside Me", "Dreaming Night" | |
| September 18, 2023 | CDTV Live! Live! Festival 2023 | Tokyo | Japan | Tokyo Garden Theater | "La Pa Pa Pam", "Rose", "Trigger", "Venus", "Phobia", "Gradation", "Radiovision", "SuperCali", "YOLO-konde", NEWSmile", "Dreaming Night" | |
| January 20–21, 2024 | Laposta 2024 | Yokohama | Japan | K-Arena Yokohama | "Trigger", "Move the Soul", "Design", "Kungchikita", "Password" (Orig. INI), "Venus", "Your Key", "Wow War Tonight", "La Pa Pa Pam", "SuperCali", "Infinity" | |
| January 27, 2024 | GMO Sonic 2024 | Saitama | Japan | Saitama Super Arena | "Trigger", "Speed of Light", "Eyes On Me" (feat. R3hab), "SuperVali", "Move the Soul", "Tiger", "Zero", "Your Key", "Wow War Tonight", "Radiovision", "YOLO-konde" | |
| March 31, 2024 | KCON Hong Kong 2024 | Lantau Island | Hong Kong | AsiaWorld-Expo | "Fairytale" (Korean ver.), "Venus" | |
| May 12, 2024 | KCON Japan 2024 | Chiba | Japan | Makuhari Messe | "Venus", "SuperCali", "Fairytale", "Happy Unbirthday", "NEWSmile", "Mirotic" (Orig. TVXQ), "Love Seeker" (Korean ver.), "Test Drive" | |
| July 7, 2024 | Peaceful Park for Noto | Kanazawa | Japan | Ishikawa Industrial Exhibition Hall | "Love Seeker", "NEWSmile" | |
| July 21, 2024 | Odaiba Adventure King 2024 | Tokyo | Japan | Fuji Television Stadium | "Love Seeker", "NEWSmile", "Lemon Candy", "Believe in You", "Radiovision", "Test Drive", "We Good" | |
| August 17, 2024 | Summer Sonic 2024 | Suita | Japan | Expo '70 Commemorative Park | "Happy Unbirthday", "Oh-Eh-Oh", "SuperCali", "Trigger", "Eyes On Me", "Believe in You", "Love Seeker", "Walk It Like I Talk It", "YOLO-konde", "Wow War Tonight" | |
| August 18, 2024 | Summer Sonic 2024 | Chiba | Japan | Makuhari Messe | "Happy Unbirthday", "Oh-Eh-Oh", "SuperCali", "Trigger", "Eyes On Me", "Believe in You", "Love Seeker", "Walk It Like I Talk It", "YOLO-konde", "Wow War Tonight" | |
| September 16, 2024 | CDTV Live! Live! Festival 2024 | Tokyo | Japan | Tokyo Garden Theater | "Test Drive", "Trigger", "Love Seeker", "Infinity", "Where Do We Go" | |
| September 21, 2024 | Rock in Japan Festival | Hitachinaka | Japan | Hitachi Seaside Park | "Happy Unbirthday", "Oh-Eh-Oh", "SuperCali", "Trigger", "Test Drive", "Eyes On Me", "Lemon Candy", "Believe in You", "Where Do We Go", "Love Seeker", "Walk It Like I Talk It", "YOLO-konde", "Wow War Tonight" | |
| September 28–29, 2024 | KCON Germany 2024 | Frankfurt | Germany | Messe Frankfurt | "Lalalala" (Orig. Stray Kids), "Where Do We Go" (Korean ver.), "Love Seeker" (Korean ver.), "Rose", "Test Drive", "Eyes On Me" | |
| October 5, 2024 | Venue 101 Extra | Tokyo | Japan | NHK Hall | Unknown | |
| October 13, 2024 | SBS Inkigayo Live in Tokyo | Saitama | Japan | Saitama Super Arena | "Where Do We Go" (Korean ver.), "Icy", "Love Seeker", "Lemon Candy" | |
| October 19, 2024 | Live Azuma 2024 | Fukushima | Japan | Azuma Sports Park | "Happy Unbirthday", "Oh-Eh-Oh", "SuperCali", "Trigger", "Test Drive", "Lemon Candy", "Romance", "Where Do We Go", "Love Seeker", "Infinity", | |
| January 31–February 2, 2025 | Laposta 2025 | Tokyo | Japan | Tokyo Dome | "Infinity", "Icy", "Love Seeker", "Join Us!!", "Cookie Party" (Orig. Me:I), "Wow War Tonight" | |
| May 10, 2025 | KCON Japan | Chiba | Japan | Makuhari Messe | "Be Classic" (Korean ver.), "Infinity 2025", "Icy", "Where Do We Go" | |
| May 11, 2025 | Gobugobu Festival | Suita | Japan | Expo '70 Commemorative Park | "Trigger", "Love Seeker", "Be Classic" "Be brave!", "Join Us!" "Infinity 2025", "Test Drive" "Wow War Tonight" | |
| July 27, 2025 | Survive Fes to Commemorate Expo 2025 | Suita | Japan | Momijigawa Lawn Plaza | "Young" (JO1 ver.), "Grandmaster" (JO1 ver.), "Happy Unbirthday", "Love Seeker", "Hottie with the Hot Tea", "EZPZ", "Be There For You", "Icy", "Monstar", "Be Classic", "Infinity 2025" | |
| August 1–3, 2025 | KCON LA | Los Angeles | United States | Crypto.com Arena | "Be Classic" (English ver.), "Love Seeker" (Korean ver.), "Fear" (Orig. by Seventeen) | |
| August 17, 2025 | Summer Sonic 2025 | Chiba | Japan | Zozo Marine Stadium | "Be Classic", "SuperCali", "Monstar", "Love Seeker", "Test Drive", "Wow War Tonight", "Hiraku", "Trigger", "Eyes On Me", "Infinity 2025", "Forever Here" | |
| October 5, 2025 | Lemino Music Fes: Lapone Day in Expo | Osaka | Japan | Expo 2025 Arena "Matsuri" | "Handz In My Pocket", "Hiraku", "Eyes On Me", "Born to be Wild" | |
| November 1, 2025 | TV Asahi Dream Festival 2025 | Chiba | Japan | Makuhari Messe | "Infinity 2025", " Happy Unbirthday", "Be Classic", " Icy", "Hiraku", " Just Say Yes", "Join Us!", "Happy Jam Jam" (JO1 ver.), "Trigger", " Love Seeker", "Test Drive", " Wow War Tonight", "Handz in My Pocket" | |
| December 2, 2025 | 2025 iHeartRadio Jingle Ball Tour | Fort Worth | United States | Dickies Arena | "Happy Unbirthday", " Rush", "Be Classic" (English ver.), "Hands in My Pocket" (English ver.) | |
| December 6, 2025 | 2025 iHeartRadio Jingle Ball Tour | Inglewood | United States | Intuit Dome | "Happy Unbirthday", " Rush", "Be Classic" (English ver.), "Hands in My Pocket" (English ver.) | |
| January 17, 2026 | GMO Sonic 2026 | Chiba | Japan | Makuhari Messe | "Happy Unbirthday", "Rush", "Speed of Light", " Be Classic", "Into You", " Hideout", "Handz In My Pocket", "Trigger", "YOLO-konde", "Eyes On Me" (feat. R3HAB), "Happy Jam Jam" (JO1 ver.) | |
| May 9, 2025 | KCON Japan | Chiba | Japan | Makuhari Messe | "Tsukame" (JO1 ver.), "Handz In My Pocket", "Breezy Love", "Icy", " Be Classic" (Korean ver.), "Lemon Candy", "Dreaming Night", " Love Seeker", "Just Say Yes", " Happy Jam Jam" (JO1 ver.), "Rush" | |
| August 16, 2026 | KCON LA | Los Angeles | United States | Crypto.com Arena | "Whatcha Doin'", " Be Classic" (English ver.), "Sakura" | |
| September 12, 2026 | Rock In Japan Festival | Chiba | Japan | Soga Sports Park | "Rush", "Animal", "Whatcha Doin'", "Sakura", "Love Seeker", "Join Us!!", "Happy Jam Jam" (JO1 ver.), "Wow War Tonight" (JO1 ver.), "Ignite" | |

== Awards ceremonies ==
List of performances at awards ceremonies, with the country of origin, date, and performed songs
| Date | Event | City | Country | Venue | Performed song(s) | Ref. |
|---|---|---|---|---|---|---|
| November 19, 2020 | 2020 MTV Video Music Awards Japan | Tokyo | Japan | Musashino Forest Sport Plaza | "Infinity", "Shine A Light" | |
| December 6, 2020 | 2020 Mnet Asian Music Awards | Paju | South Korea | CJ ENM Contents World | "Infinity", "Shine A Light" | |
| November 25, 2021 | 2021 MTV Video Music Awards Japan | Tokyo | Japan | Musashino Forest Sport Plaza | "Real", "Bokura no Kisetsu" | |
| December 11, 2021 | 2021 Mnet Asian Music Awards | Paju | South Korea | CJ ENM Contents World | "Bokura no Kisetsu" | |
| November 2, 2022 | 2022 MTV Video Music Awards Japan | Tokyo | Japan | Musashino Forest Sport Plaza | "SuperCali", "With Us" | |
| November 29, 2022 | 2022 MAMA Awards | Osaka | Japan | Kyocera Dome | "SuperCali" (MAMA ver.) | |
| November 28, 2023 | 2023 MAMA Awards | Tokyo | Japan | Tokyo Dome | "Venus" | |
| December 30, 2023 | Japan Record Awards | Tokyo | Japan | New National Theatre | "Trigger" | |
| April 10, 2024 | Asia Star Entertainer Awards | Yokohama | Japan | K-Arena Yokohama | "SuperCali", "Happy Unbirthday", "Trigger" | |
| September 8, 2024 | The Fact Music Awards | Osaka | Japan | Kyocera Dome | "Trigger", "Love Seeker", "Test Drive" | |
| November 17, 2024 | Korea Grand Music Awards | Incheon | South Korea | Inspire Arena | "Where Do We Go" (Korean ver.), "Love Seeker" (Korean ver.) | |
| December 30, 2024 | Japan Record Awards | Tokyo | Japan | New National Theatre | "Love Seeker" | |
| August 23, 2025 | TMElive International Music Awards | Macao | China | Galaxy Arena | "Be Classic", "Icy", "Happy Unbirthday", "Love Seeker", "Eyes on Me", "Monstar" | |
| November 29, 2025 | 2025 MAMA Awards | Hong Kong | China | Kai Tak Stadium | "Be Classic", "Handz in My Pocket" | |
| October 29, 2026 | 2026 MTV Video Music Awards Japan | Tokyo | Japan | Tokyo Dome | "Be Classic", "Ignite" | |

== Television shows and specials ==
List of performances at television shows and specials, with the country of origin, date, and performed songs
| Date | Event | City | Country | Performed song(s) | Ref. |
|---|---|---|---|---|---|
| December 2, 2020 | 2020 FNS Music Festival | Tokyo | Japan | "Shine A Light" | |
| December 31, 2020 | CDTV Live! Live! New Year's Eve Special 2020 → 2021 | Tokyo | Japan | "Infinity" | |
| May 1, 2021 | Kamioto - Kamigata Song Festival | Osaka | Japan | "Born to be Wild" | |
| July 14, 2021 | 2021 FNS Music Festival Summer | Tokyo | Japan | "240,000,000 No Hitomi: Exotic Japan" (2億4千万の瞳 -エキゾチック・ジャパン) with Hiromi Go | |
| August 29, 2021 | FNS Laugh & Music | Tokyo | Japan | "Real", "Odoru Pompokolin" (Orig. B.B.Queens) | |
| November 11, 2021 | Best Hits Kayosai | Osaka | Japan | "Run&Go" | |
| December 1, 2021 | 2021 FNS Music Festival | Tokyo | Japan | "Bokura no Kisetsu", "Furui Nikki" (古い日記) with Akiko Wada | |
| December 31, 2021 | CDTV Live! Live! New Year's Eve Special 2021 → 2022 | Tokyo | Japan | "Bokura no Kisetsu" | |
| March 30, 2022 | This Is JO1 - Go to the Dream | Tokyo | Japan | "Infinity", "Shine a Light", "Toberu Kara", "YOLO-konde", "Dreamer" | |
| May 28, 2022 | Kamioto - Kamigata Song Festival | Osaka | Japan | "With Us" | |
| June 25, 2022 | Tonight Show | Jakarta | Indonesia | "All Hours" | |
| August 6, 2022 | Live Yell 2022 (Note: Performed remotely from South Korea) | Tokyo | Japan | "Shine a Light" | |
| November 10, 2022 | Best Hits Kayosai | Osaka | Japan | "SuperCali" | |
| December 12, 2022 | 2022 FNS Music Festival | Tokyo | Japan | "Last Christmas" (Orig. Wham!) | |
| December 31, 2022 | 73rd NHK Kōhaku Uta Gassen | Tokyo | Japan | "Infinity" | |
| December 31, 2022 | CDTV Live! Live! New Year's Eve Special 2022 → 2023 | Tokyo | Japan | "SuperCali" | |
| April 29, 2023 | Venue101 Presents JO1 Request Live | Tokyo | Japan | "Born to be Wild", "Safety Zone", "We Alright", "Romance", "Trigger", "SuperCali", "Dreaming Night" | |
| June 17, 2023 | Kamioto - Kamigata Song Festival | Osaka | Japan | "Trigger" | |
| July 12, 2023 | 2023 FNS Music Festival Summer | Tokyo | Japan | "NEWSmile", "Choo Choo Train" and "Y.M.C.A." with Generations from Exile Tribe | |
| July 15, 2023 | Ongaku no Hi 2023 | Tokyo | Japan | "Trigger", "Ageha" with Generations from Exile Tribe, "SuperCali" with &Team | |
| November 15, 2023 | TV Tokyo Music Festival 2023 | Tokyo | Japan | "Venus" | |
| November 16, 2023 | Best Hits Kayousai | Osaka | Japan | "Radiovision", "Show" (Orig. Ado) | |
| December 2, 2023 | Best Artist | Tokyo | Japan | "TT" (Orig. Twice), "Wow War Tonight" (Orig. H jungle with t) | |
| December 6, 2023 | 2023 FNS Music Festival | Tokyo | Japan | "Summer Color" with Yuzu | |
| December 18, 2023 | CDTV Live! Live! Christmas Special | Tokyo | Japan | "Tiger" | |
| December 31, 2023 | 74th NHK Kōhaku Uta Gassen | Tokyo | Japan | "NEWSmile" | |
| December 31, 2023 | CDTV Live! Live! New Year's Eve Special 2023 → 2024 | Tokyo | Japan | "Trigger" | |
| November 14, 2024 | Best Hits Kayousai | Osaka | Japan | "Icy" | |
| December 4, 2024 | 2024 FNS Music Festival | Tokyo | Japan | "Icy" | |
| December 16, 2024 | CDTV Live! Live! Christmas Special | Tokyo | Japan | "Love Seeker" | |
| December 31, 2024 | 75th NHK Kōhaku Uta Gassen | Tokyo | Japan | "Love Seeker" | |
| December 31, 2024 | CDTV Live! Live! New Year's Eve Special 2024 → 2025 | Tokyo | Japan | "Love Seeker", "Join Us!!" | |
| March 14, 2025 | Good Day New York | New York City | United States | "Love Seeker" | |
| December 10, 2025 | 2025 FNS Music Festival | Tokyo | Japan | "Handz in My Pocket" | |
| December 26, 2025 | Music Station Super Live 2025 | Tokyo | Japan | "Be Classic" | |

== Other live performances ==
List of other notable live performances, with the location, date, and performed songs
| Date | Event | City | Country | Venue | Performed song(s) | Ref. |
|---|---|---|---|---|---|---|
| January 29, 2020 | Louis Vuitton Maison Osaka Midosuji Opening Event After Party | Osaka | Japan | Louis Vuitton Maison Osaka Midosuji | "Young" (JO1 ver.), "Tsukame (It's Coming)" (JO1 ver.) | |
| September 25, 2020 | 31st Mynavi Tokyo Girls Collection Autumn/Winter 2020 | Saitama | Japan | Saitama Super Arena | "Go", "So What", "Oh-Eh-Oh" | |
| February 28, 2021 | 32nd Mynavi Tokyo Girls Collection Spring/Summer 2021 | Tokyo | Japan | Yoyogi National Gymnasium | "So What", "Monstar", "Shine A Light" | |
| October 8, 2022 | Rakuten GirlsAward 2022 Autumn/Winter | Chiba | Japan | Makuhari Messe | "Infinity", "YOLO-konde", "SuperCali" | |
| February 11, 2023 | Fujifilm Super Cup 2023 Halftime Show | Tokyo | Japan | Japan National Stadium | Unknown | |
| July 23, 2023 | J.League World Challenge Halftime Show | Tokyo | Japan | Japan National Stadium | "Trigger", "NEWSmile" | |
| March 10, 2025 | Global Spin Live | Los Angeles | United States | Grammy Museum | "Icy", "Trigger", "Hideout", "Eyes On Me" | |
| April 28, 2025 | Japan Heritage Night | Los Angeles | United States | Dodger Stadium | "Be Classic" (English ver.), "Love Seeker", "Trigger", "Eyes On Me" | |
| June 15, 2025 | Walk the Talk for SDGs in Expo 2025 UN & Yoshimoto | Osaka | Japan | Expo 2025 Hall "Shine Hut" | "Be Classic", "Love Seeker", "Wow War Tonight" | |
