= Hitchhiker (EP) =

2024 single by JO1

- Normal and digital special edition cover

Single by JO1

from the album Be Classic
- Language: Japanese
- A-side: "Love Seeker"
- Released: May 29, 2024
- Recorded: 2023
- Genre: J-pop
- Length: 12:03 (limited edition A); 12:11 (limited edition B); 12:29 (normal edition); 18:17 (special edition)
- Label: Lapone Entertainment

JO1 singles chronology
"Tropical Night" (2023)	"Hitchhiker" (2024)	"Where Do We Go" (2024)

Music video
- "Love Seeker" on YouTube

Hitchhiker (stylized in all caps) is an extended play (EP) marketed as the eighth single of Japanese boy band JO1. It also served as the lead single for their first greatest hits album, Be Classic (2025). The EP single includes six songs and was released by Lapone Entertainment in four editions on May 29, 2024, with the Japan Record Excellent Work Award winner "Love Seeker" serving as the lead track.

== Commercial performance ==
Hitchiker debuted at number one on Oricon Daily Singles Chart with 415,697 copies sold. The EP single became the group's eight consecutive number-one on the weekly chart with 505,623 copies sold; it was also the fifth single in 2024 that exceeded half a million sales in its first week. Hitchiker also topped the Billboard Japan Top Singles Sales chart with 738,775 copies sold. The EP single marks the group's first Triple Platinum certification by the Recording Industry Association of Japan for more than 750,000 copies in shipments.

== Track listing ==
"Love Seeker", "Test Drive" are common tracks 1 and 2 for all editions.

Track listing of Hitchhiker – Limited edition A
No.	Title	Lyrics	Music	Arrangement	Length
1.	"Love Seeker"	Ellie Love; Masami Kakinuma; Kevin_D (D_answer); Charlotte Wilson; Celotron (Decade +)	Kevin_D; Ddank (D_answer); Zamun (D_answer); Wilson; Celotron	Kevin_D; Ddank; Zamun	2:54
2.	"Test Drive"	Chiaki Nagasawa; Ryo Ito; Kakinuma; Nathan; Kim Hye-jung; Ronnie Icon; Kyler Niko	Nathan; Niko; Icon; One.Ki; Wilson; Celotron; Taneisha Jackson; Hwang Jae-hyun; Xerry; Seoa; Lee Beom-hun; Elum	Nathan; Lee	3:12
3.	"Lemon Candy"	Yuki Kokubo; Yhel; Junki; Jung Yong-hwa	Jung; Park Soo-suk; Seo Ji-eun	Park; Seo	3:07
4.	"Sugar" (performed by Kinjo, Kono, Mamehara, Ohira, Shiroiwa)	Tsingtao; Come	Sean Oh; Come; Wonder B	Wonder B; Sean Oh	2:50
Total length:					12:03

Track listing of Hitchhiker – Limited edition B
No.	Title	Lyrics	Music	Arrangement	Length
3.	"Lemon Candy"				3:07
4.	"Lied to You" (performed by Kawanishi, Kawashiri, Kimata, Sato, Tsurubo, Yonashiro)	Kana Tetsuha	Aron Bergerwall; Nick Bradley; Amanda Jerlov	Aron Wyme	2:58
Total length:					12:11

Track listing of Hitchhiker – Normal edition
No.	Title	Lyrics	Music	Arrangement	Length
3.	"Lemon Candy"				3:07
4.	"Aqua"	Anna Kusakawa; Itsuka; Hiyori Nara; Gratia	Kusakawa; Kengo Ishibashi; Osamu Fukuzawa	Ishibashi; Fukuzawa	3:16
Total length:					12:29

Track listing of Hitchhiker – Special edition
No.	Title	Length
3.	"Sugar" (performed by Kinjo, Kono, Mamehara, Ohira, Shiroiwa)	2:50
4.	"Lied to You" (performed by Kawanishi, Kawashiri, Kimata, Sato, Tsurubo, Yonashiro)	2:58
5.	"Lemon Candy"	3:07
6.	"Aqua"	3:16
Total length:		18:17

Track listing of Hitchhiker – Limited edition A (DVD)
No.	Title	Length
1.	"アイのBINGOを目指せ！LOVE MISSION HIKER (前編)"
2.	"'16 (Sixteen)' Live Performance" (2023 JO1 2nd Arena Live Tour "Beyond The Dark" 2023.08.06 at Ariake Arena, Tokyo)

Track listing of Hitchhiker – Limited edition B (DVD)
No.	Title	Length
1.	"アイのBINGOを目指せ！LOVE MISSION HIKER (前編)"
2.	" 'Ryūseiu' Live Performance" (2023 JO1 2nd Arena Live Tour "Beyond The Dark" 2023.10.19 at Osaka Castle Hall, Osaka)

== Charts ==
=== Weekly charts ===
Weekly chart performance for Hitchiker
Chart (2024)	Peak position
Japan (Oricon)	1
Japan Combined Singles (Oricon)	1
Japanese Combined Albums (Oricon)	11
Japan Top Singles Sales (Billboard Japan)	1

=== Year-end charts ===
2024 year-end chart performance for Hitchhiker
Chart (2024)	Position
Japan (Oricon)	11
Japan Top Singles Sales (Billboard Japan)	9

== Certifications ==
Certifications and sales for Hitchiker
Region	Certification	Certified units/sales
Japan (RIAJ)	3× Platinum	750,000^{^}
^{^} Shipments figures based on certification alone.

== Release history ==
Release dates and formats for Hitchiker
Region	Date	Label	Format	Edition	Catalog
Japan	May 29, 2024	Lapone Entertainment	CD; DVD	Limited A	YRCS-90243
Japan	May 29, 2024	Lapone Entertainment	CD; DVD	Limited B	YRCS-90244
Japan	May 29, 2024	Lapone Entertainment	CD	Normal	YRCS-90245
Various	May 29, 2024	Lapone Entertainment	Download; streaming	Special	—N/a
