= Handz in My Pocket =

2025 single by JO1

- Normal edition cover

Single by JO1
- Language: Japanese; English
- A-side: "Handz in My Pocket"
- Released: October 22, 2025
- Recorded: 2025
- Genre: J-pop
- Length: 13:29 (limited edition A); 14:13 (limited edition B); 12:44 (normal & fan club edition); 20:00 (special edition)
- Label: Lapone Entertainment
- Producers: 808MALC; INFX; Tomi Yo; Z; Kevin_D

JO1 singles chronology
"Where Do We Go" (2024)	"Handz in My Pocket" (2025)

Music video
- "Handz in My Pocket" on YouTube

Handz in My Pocket is an extended play (EP) marketed as the ninth single of Japanese boy band JO1. The EP single includes six songs and was released by Lapone Entertainment in four editions on October 22, 2025, featuring the eponymous lead track. It is the final JO1 release as an eleven-member band after Shion Tsurubo and Shosei Ohira left in 2025 and 2026, respectively.

== Commercial performance ==
Handz in My Pocket debuted at number one on Oricon Daily Singles Chart, marking their tenth consecutive number-one single since their debut. It eventually topped the weekly chart, selling 505,000 copies. The EP single also topped the Billboard Japan Top Singles Sales chart with 692,223 copies sold and earned the Triple Platinum certification by the Recording Industry Association of Japan for more than 750,000 copies in shipments.

== Track listing ==
"Handz in My Pocket" and "Just Say Yes" are common tracks 1 and 2 for all editions.

Track listing of Handz in My Pocket – Limited edition A
No.	Title	Lyrics	Music	Arrangement	Length
1.	"Handz in My Pocket"	Masami Kakinuma; Kana Koizumi; Tatsune; Ryan Shin; ChaMane; 808MALC	Shin; ChaMane; 808MALC; Flash Note	808MALC	2:49
2.	"Just Say Yes"	Hasegawa; Avenue 52; Sqvare	INFX; Avenue 52; Sqvare	INFX	3:15
3.	"Rush"	Masato Kanai; Kakinuma; Shin; One.Ki	Shin; One.Ki; 808MALC; Flash Note	808MALC	2:58
4.	"Hiraku" (ひらく)	Motohiro Hata	Hata	Tomi Yo	4:27
Total length:					13:29

Track listing of Handz in My Pocket – Limited edition B
No.	Title	Lyrics	Music	Arrangement	Length
3.	"Into You"	Kevin_D (D_answer); Etham; Kentz; Blue.D (D_answer); Rolie M (D_answer)	Kevin_D; Etham; Z; Hautboi Rich; Wondertaker (D_answer)	Z; Kevin_D	3:42
4.	"Hiraku" (ひらく)				4:27
Total length:					14:13

Track listing of Handz in My Pocket – Normal and Fan Club edition
No.	Title	Length
3.	"Rush"	2:58
4.	"Into You"	3:42
Total length:		12:44

Track listing of Handz in My Pocket – Special edition
No.	Title	Length
3.	"Rush"	2:58
4.	"Into You"	3:42
5.	"Hiraku" (ひらく)	4:27
6.	"Handz in My Pocket" (English ver.)	2:49
Total length:		20:00

Track listing of Handz in My Pocket – Limited edition A (DVD)
No.	Title	Length
1.	"Sugar" (from Wherever We Are 2024 in Hyogo)
2.	"Be With You" (from Wherever We Are 2024 in Hyogo)
3.	"Lemon Candy" (from Wherever We Are 2024 in Hyogo)

Track listing of Handz in My Pocket – Limited edition B (DVD)
No.	Title	Length
1.	"Lied to You" (from Wherever We Are 2024 in Hyogo)
2.	"Radiovision" (from Wherever We Are 2024 in Hyogo)
3.	"Lied to You" (from Wherever We Are 2024 in Hyogo)

== Charts ==
=== Weekly charts ===
Weekly chart performance for Handz in My Pocket
Chart (2025)	Peak position
Japan (Oricon)	1
Japan Combined Singles (Oricon)	1
Japanese Combined Albums (Oricon)	19
Japan Top Singles Sales (Billboard Japan)	1

=== Year-end charts ===
Year-end chart performance for Handz in My Pocket
Chart (2025)	Position
Japan Top Singles Sales (Billboard Japan)	6

== Certifications ==
Certifications and sales for Handz in My Pocket
Region	Certification	Certified units/sales
Japan (RIAJ)	3× Platinum	750,000^{^}
^{^} Shipments figures based on certification alone.

== Release history ==
Release dates and formats for Handz in My Pocket
Region	Date	Label	Format	Edition	Catalog
Japan	October 22, 2025	Lapone Entertainment	CD; DVD	Limited A	YRCS-90266
Japan	October 22, 2025	Lapone Entertainment	CD; DVD	Limited B	YRCS-90267
Japan	October 22, 2025	Lapone Entertainment	CD	Normal	YRCS-90268
Japan	October 22, 2025	Lapone Entertainment	CD	Fan Club	YRCS-90043–90053
Various	October 22, 2025	Lapone Entertainment	Download; streaming	Special	—N/a
