= Stranger (EP) =

- Normal and digital special edition cover

Single by JO1

from the album Kizuna
- Language: Japanese
- A-side: "Real"
- Released: August 18, 2021
- Recorded: 2021
- Genre: J-pop; EDM; futurepop; city pop
- Length: 13:30 (Limited edition A); 13:42 (Limited edition B); 13:45 (Normal edition); 20:29 (Special edition)
- Label: Lapone Entertainment
- Producers: Jung Ho-hyun; Score; Megatone; Teito; Lee Min-young (Eastwest); Yeul (1by1); KZ; Honeysweet; Gloryface; Yuka

JO1 singles chronology
"Challenger" (2021)	"Stranger" (2021)	"Wandering" (2021)

Music video
- "Real" on YouTube

Stranger (stylized in all caps) is an extended play (EP) marketed as the fourth single of Japanese boy band JO1. It also served as the second single for their second studio album, Kizuna (2022). The EP single includes six songs primarily from the EDM, futurepop, and city pop genres, and was released by Lapone Entertainment in three physical editions and one digital edition on August 18, 2021. It features contributions from Japanese lyricists and South Korean producers, including Yhanael, Jung Ho-hyun, Score, Megatone, KZ, Full8loom among others.

Prior to the release, the two B-side tracks were made available as a digital single. "Dreaming Night" was released on June 25 as the opening song Love Phantom, while "Freedom" was released on July 7 for Yves Saint Laurent Beauté's fragrance web commercial video. Both tracks charted on Billboard Japan Hot 100. Stranger became the group's fourth single that reached number on the Oricon Singles Chart and their fastest single to sell over 400,000 copies, according to Billboard Japan. It was certified Platinum by the Recording Industry Association of Japan (RIAJ), while the lead track "Real" peaked atop the Billboard Japan Hot 100. Its music video was named Best Dance Video at the 2021 MTV Video Music Awards Japan.

== Background and release ==
On June 8, 2021, JO1 made his third appearance as the headliner for Tokyo Girls Collection. During the 2021 Sanrio Character Awards' result presentation part of the event, the group performed two songs from their first studio album, The Star (2020): "Shine a Light" and "Yancha Girl Yancha Boy". For the latter, they collaborated with Cinnamoroll. After the performance, leader Sho Yonashiro announced the group's fourth EP single, Stranger, would be released on August 18, 2021. Continuing the idea of their previous single, where they were "stepping into the unknown world", this single's concept was described as "encountering the world and discovering a new self". The cover images were revealed on June 21. On the release day, JO1 hosted a commemorative live broadcast in which they announced that their first live concert, Open the Door, would take place at Makuhari Messe in Chiba city from November 19 to 21, 2021.

Stranger includes a total of six songs and was released in three different physical editions, with "Real" serving as the lead track. Each edition contains four tracks with three common tracks: "Real", "Icarus" and "Blooming Again". The special tracks for the limited edition A and B, "Freedom" and "Dreaming Night", were released as digital singles on July 7 and June 25, respectively, while "Icarus" was pre-released on August 11 with its performance video. The limited edition A comes with a DVD bundle featuring a variety segment titled Beautiful Stranger. The limited edition B and the normal edition come with a photo booklet and a CD-only, respectively. A special edition EP containing all songs was also released for digital download and streaming.

== Lead track ==
The lead track "Real" is an EDM song from the futurepop genre. Jung Ho-hyun (e.one), who was in charge of lyrics, composing, and arrangement, has collaborated with groups such as Wanna One and Exo. The lyrics were said to reflect JO1's growth and evolution. Yoo Seung-hyun choreographed the move in which the members hugging each other to symbolize JO1 meeting their "new" selves for the first time. The music video similarly conveyed the message through the use of mirrors and water.

The song was pre-released on July 30, 2021, alongside the music video. It was used as the theme song for the 18th edition of Fuji TV's annual summer event, The Odaiba, which took place from August 14 to September 5, 2021. It later peaked at number one on the Billboard Japan Hot 100. Ryohei Shingu directed the music video, which was named Best Dance Video at the 2021 MTV Video Music Awards Japan.

== Promotion ==
The promotion for Stranger started with the first performance of the B-side track "Dreaming Night", which was the opening song of MBS's drama Love Phantom, at the KCON:TACT 4U on June 25, 2021. The group also performed the song on their namesake TV show Toresugi JO1 2 on July 16. The song peaked at number 85 on the Billboard Japan Hot 100 in its second week. On July 7, JO1 performed another B-side track, "Freedom", at the launching of Yves Saint Laurent Beauté's fragrance online ad video featuring the song. A performance video for the song was released on the group's official YouTube channel on the same day. The song debuted at number 82 on Billboard Japan Hot 100.

To further promote the single, JO1 was named "artist of the month" for Tokyo FM's nationwide weekly program Monthly Artist File: The Voice in August 2021. They also released a performance video for "Icarus", which serves as the "answer song" to "Monstar" from The Star (2020). Both performance video of "Icarus" and "Freedom" were directed by Hidejin Kato. JO1 later released a self-produced music video for "Stay".

On August 13, JO1 debuted "Real" on the morning show Mezamashi 8. The performance served as a teaser for their live performance at The Odaiba the next day, where they performed three more songs from the single as well as their past lead track, "Born to Be Wild". They also performed "Real" on CDTV Live Live and their namesake show Playlist JO1. On September 23, JO1 participated in the joint live concert KCON World Premiere: The Triangle with fellow Produce 101 Japan subsequent groups such as OWV and Enjin. They performed all songs from Stranger between the two shows.

== Commercial performance ==
Stranger debuted at number one on the Oricon Daily Singles Chart and eventually topped the weekly chart with over 280,000 copies sold, continuing the group's streak since their debut single Protostar. Due to this run, JO1 became the fifth male group and ninth overall in Oricon charts history to have four consecutive singles with first-week sales of over 200,000 copies since their debut. JO1 saw an increase in sales, with Stranger outselling the last two singles in its second week on the Oricon Charts. The single was certified Platinum by the Recording Industry Association of Japan for shipments of over 250,000 physical units. By the end of 2021, the single had sold 366,212 copies, placing it twenty-first on the Oricon annual chart.

On Billboard Japan, Stranger debuted at number one on the Top Singles Sales chart and became JO1's fastest single to sell over 400,000 copies (in two weeks). The single eventually became the twenty-first best selling single of 2021.

== Track listing ==
"Real", "Icarus" and "Blooming Again" are common track 1, 3 and 4, respectively, for limited edition A, limited edition B and normal edition.

Track listing of Stranger – Limited edition A
No.	Title	Lyrics	Music	Arrangement	Length
1.	"Real"	Jung Ho-hyun (e.one); Yhanael	Jung Ho-hyun	Jung Ho-hyun	3:14
2.	"Freedom"	Score (13); Megatone (13); Onestar; Luke (13); Yhanael	Score; Megatone; Onestar	Score; Megatone	3:16
3.	"Icarus"	Skinner Box; Minami	Teito (KCKT); Skinner Box	Teito	3:16
4.	"Blooming Again"	Choi Hyun-joon; Mion Yano	Lee Min-young (Eastwest)	Lee; Yeul (1by1)	3:44
Total length:					13:30

Track listing of Stranger – Limited edition B
No.	Title	Lyrics	Music	Arrangement	Length
2.	"Dreaming Night"	KZ; Stainboys; Chungyoon (Joombas)	KZ; Honeysweat; Puyo	KZ; Honeysweat	3:28
Total length:					13:42

Track listing of Stranger – Normal edition
No.	Title	Lyrics	Music	Arrangement	Length
2.	"Stay"	Jinli (Full8loom)	Gloryface (Full8loom); Jinli; Yuka (Full8loom)	Gloryface; Yuka	3:31
Total length:					13:45

Track listing of Stranger – Special edition (digital)
No.	Title	Length
1.	"Real"	3:14
2.	"Freedom"	3:16
3.	"Dreaming Night"	3:28
4.	"Stay"	3:31
5.	"Icarus"	3:16
6.	"Blooming Again"	3:44
Total length:		20:29

Track listing of Stranger – Limited edition A (DVD)
No.	Title	Length
1.	"Beautiful Stranger"	1:01:02

== Charts ==
=== Weekly charts ===
Weekly chart performance for Stranger
Chart (2021)	Peak position
Japan (Oricon)	1
Japan Combined Singles (Oricon)	1
Japan Top Singles Sales (Billboard Japan)	1

=== Monthly charts ===
Monthly chart performance for Stranger
Chart (2021)	Peak position
Japan (Oricon)	2

=== Year-end charts ===
2021 year-end chart performance for Stranger
Chart (2021)	Position
Japan (Oricon)	21
Japan Combined Singles (Oricon)	48
Japan Top Singles Sales (Billboard Japan)	21

== Certifications ==
Certifications and sales for Stranger
Region	Certification	Certified units/sales
Japan (RIAJ)	Platinum	250,000^{^}
^{^} Shipments figures based on certification alone.

== Release history ==
Release dates and formats for Stranger
Region	Date	Label	Format(s)	Edition	Catalog
Japan	August 18, 2021	Lapone Entertainment	CD; DVD	Limited A	YRCS-90196
Japan	August 18, 2021	Lapone Entertainment	CD; photo booklet	Limited B	YRCS-90197
Japan	August 18, 2021	Lapone Entertainment	CD	Normal	YRCS-90198
Various	August 18, 2021	Lapone Entertainment	Download; streaming	Special	—N/a
