= Where Do We Go (EP) =

2024 single by JO1

- Normal and digital special edition cover

Single by JO1

from the album Be Classic
- Language: Japanese
- A-side: "Where Do We Go"
- Released: October 2, 2024
- Recorded: 2024
- Genre: J-pop
- Length: 13:44 (limited edition A); 12:30 (limited edition B); 11:37 (normal edition); 19:23 (special edition)
- Label: Lapone Entertainment
- Producers: 808MALC; Yeo Sang-yoon; Czaer; Haechi; Joacim Persson; Johan Alkenäs; Hayato Tanaka; Toyo

JO1 singles chronology
"Hitchhiker" (2024)	"Where Do We Go" (2024)	"Handz in My Pocket" (2025)

Music video
- "Where Do We Go" on YouTube

Where Do We Go (stylized in all caps) is an extended play (EP) marketed as the eighth single of Japanese boy band JO1. It also served as the second single for their first greatest hits album, Be Classic (2025). The EP single includes six songs and was released by Lapone Entertainment in four editions on October 2, 2024, featuring the eponymous lead track.

== Commercial performance ==
Where Do We Go debuted at number one on Oricon Daily Singles Chart with 451,090 copies sold. The EP single became the group's ninth consecutive number-one on the weekly chart and second consecutive single to sell over a half million copies in its first week with 542,527 copies sold. Where Do We Go also topped the Billboard Japan Top Singles Sales chart with 732,009 copies sold and earned the Triple Platinum certification by the Recording Industry Association of Japan for more than 750,000 copies in shipments.

== Track listing ==
"Where Do We Go", "Icy" are common tracks 1 and 2 for all editions.

Track listing of Where Do We Go – Limited edition A
No.	Title	Lyrics	Music	Arrangement	Length
1.	"Where Do We Go"	Hiyori Nara; Kuzzi; Ryan Shin (153/Joombas)	Kuzzi; Ryan Shin; 808MALC; Yeo Sang-yoon	808MALC; Yeo Sang-yoon	2:37
2.	"Icy"	Ellie Love; Okhan Uenver	Czaer; Haechi; Okhan Uenver; Whyminsu; Glen Choi	Czaer; Haechi	3:21
3.	"Cross the Line"	Gratia; Masami Kakinuma (Relic Lylic,inc.)	Sqvare (ARTiffect); Avenue 52 (ARTiffect); Joacim Persson (ARTiffect); Johan Alkenäs(ARTiffect)	Joacim Persson; Johan Alkenäs	3:30
4.	"Believe in You"	T2	Kazu; Yuta	Hayato Tanaka	4:16
Total length:					13:44

Track listing of Where Do We Go – Limited edition B
No.	Title	Lyrics	Music	Arrangement	Length
3.	"Maybe Next Time"	Gratia	Toyo; Avenue 52; Sqvare	Toyo	3:02
4.	"Cross the Line"				3:30
Total length:					12:30

Track listing of Where Do We Go – Normal edition
No.	Title	Length
3.	"Maybe Next Time"	3:02
4.	"Where Do We Go" (Korean ver.)	2:37
Total length:		11:37

Track listing of Where Do We Go – Special edition
No.	Title	Length
3.	"Maybe Next Time"	3:02
4.	"Cross the Line"	3:30
5.	"Believe in You"	4:16
6.	"Where Do We Go" (Korean ver.)	2:37
Total length:		19:23

Track listing of Where Do We Go – Limited edition A (DVD)
No.	Title	Length
1.	"JO1 Self-produced Runway (First part)"

Track listing of Where Do We Go – Limited edition B (DVD)
No.	Title	Length
1.	"JO1 Self-produced Runway (Second part)"

== Charts ==
=== Weekly charts ===
Weekly chart performance for Where Do We Go
Chart (2024)	Peak position
Japan (Oricon)	1
Japan Combined Singles (Oricon)	1
Japanese Combined Albums (Oricon)	11
Japan Top Singles Sales (Billboard Japan)	1

=== Year-end charts ===
2024 year-end chart performance for Where Do We Go
Chart (2024)	Position
Japan (Oricon)	8
Japan Top Singles Sales (Billboard Japan)	10

== Certifications ==
Certifications and sales for Where Do We Go
Region	Certification	Certified units/sales
Japan (RIAJ)	3× Platinum	750,000^{^}
^{^} Shipments figures based on certification alone.

== Release history ==
Release dates and formats for Where Do We Go
Region	Date	Label	Format	Edition	Catalog
Japan	October 2, 2024	Lapone Entertainment	CD; DVD	Limited A	YRCS-90255
Japan	October 2, 2024	Lapone Entertainment	CD; DVD	Limited B	YRCS-90256
Japan	October 2, 2024	Lapone Entertainment	CD	Normal	YRCS-90257
Various	October 2, 2024	Lapone Entertainment	Download; streaming	Special	—N/a
