= Challenger (EP) =

- Normal and digital special edition cover

Single by JO1

from the album Kizuna
- Language: Japanese
- A-side: "Born to Be Wild"
- Released: April 28, 2021
- Recorded: 2021
- Genre: J-pop
- Length: 13:37 (Limited edition A); 13:33 (Limited edition B); 13:46 (Normal edition); 21:10 (Special edition)
- Label: Lapone Entertainment
- Producers: Score (13); Megatone (13); Savage House Gang; $$am; Jone (Papermaker); Teito; Jung Ho-hyun (e.one); Ji Ye June; Jayins; Naiv

JO1 singles chronology
"Stargazer" (2020)	"Challenger" (2021)	"Stranger" (2021)

Music video
- "Born to Be Wild" on YouTube

Challenger (stylized in all caps) is an extended play (EP) marketed as the third single of Japanese boy band JO1. It also served as the lead single for their second studio album, Kizuna (2022). The EP single includes a total of six songs and was released by Lapone Entertainment in three physical editions and one digital edition on April 28, 2021. It features the contributions from Japanese and South Korean songwriters and production teams, including Score, Megatone, Teito, Kebee, Masahiro Ōchi, Hayato Tanaka among others. The single topped the Oricon Singles Chart and was certified Platinum by the Recording Industry Association of Japan (RIAJ), with its lead track "Born to Be Wild" peaked atop the Billboard Japan Hot 100.

== Background and release ==
In early January 2021, JO1 reportedly traveled to South Korea to prepare for a new single. On February 20, JO1 hosted their second online concert, Starlight Deluxe, in Paju to promote their first studio album The Star. At the end of the concert, the group revealed their third single would be released on April 28, 2021. Following their journey to become their "shining self" in the previous release, the single's premise was described as JO1 "stepping into the unknown world". The cover images were released on the group's first anniversary on March 4, along with the news of their first tour in winter. To celebrate the release of the single, the group hosted a live streaming event on YouTube on April 28, followed by the release of the performance video for "Speed of Light". On May, the performance video for Design" was also released.

Challenger includes a total of six songs and was released in three different physical editions, with "Born to Be Wild" served as the lead track. It was the group's first release without songs from Produce 101 Japan. Each edition contains four tracks with three common tracks: "Born to be Wild", "Design" and "Tsutaerareru Nara" (伝えられるなら, 'If You Can Tell'). The latter was the theme song for Kit Kat Japan's commercial and was released as a digital single on January 18. The limited edition A comes with a DVD bundle, featuring variety segment titled JO1 Challenge. The limited edition B comes with a photo booklet, while the normal edition is CD-only. A special edition EP containing all songs was released for digital download and streaming.

== Lead track and promotion ==
"Born to be Wild" is mainly composed of retro funk-inspired bass lines and rhythms. The music video was released on March 24, 2021, and was directed by Seo Dong-hyeok of the South Korean production studio Flipevil The theme was described as "challenge", in which the group "bravely opening the door with anxiety and expectation, taking the first step, and overcoming obstacles with determination". The song was performed for the first time at the KCON:TACT 3, before it was digitally pre-released alongside "Tsutaerareru Nara" on March 25, 2021. It debuted at eighty-eighth on the Billboard Japan Hot 100 and eventually peaked at number one. The song was also performed in the group's first terrestrial TV show Toresugi JO1, as well as in several television shows such as Hey!Hey!Neo! Music Champ, CDTV Live Live, and NHK's variety talk show Numa ni Hamatte Kiitemita. "Born to Be Wild" was also used as the theme song for ABC-Mart's TV commercial of Nike Air Max Infinity 2.

== Commercial performance ==
Challenger debuted at number one on the Oricon Daily Singles Chart and eventually topped the weekly chart with 254,111 copies sold. The feat made JO1 the sixth male group and the twelfth overall in the Oricon charts history to have three consecutive singles with first-week sales of over 200,000 copies since their debut. The single was certified Platinum by the Recording Industry Association of Japan for more than 250,000 copies in shipments. The single eventually ranked at twenty-second on the 2020 Oricon Annual Ranking with 309,606 units sold.

Challenger also debuted atop of Billboard Japan's Top Singles Sales chart, and putting JO1 in second place on the Artist 100. It eventually placed twenty-third on the annual edition of Top Single Sales chart.

== Track listing ==
"Born to be Wild", "Design" and "Tsutaerareru Nara" are common track 1, 3 and 4, respectively, for limited edition A, limited edition B and normal edition.

Track listing of Challenger – Limited edition A
No.	Title	Lyrics	Music	Arrangement	Length
1.	"Born to Be Wild"	Score (13); Megatone (13); J.rise; Jayins; Yhanael	Score; Megatone	Score; Megatone	3:45
2.	"Speed of Light"	Score; Megatone; HLB (13); Luke (13); Yhanael	Score; Megatone; HLB; Luke; Savage House Gang	Score; Megatone; Savage House Gang	3:44
3.	"Design"	Yohei	Yohei; Jung Ho-hyun (e.one); Dono	Jung Ho-hyun	3:04
4.	"Tsutaerareru Nara" (伝えられるなら, 'If You Can Tell')	Ji Ye June; Jayins; Naiv; Teito	Ji Ye June; Jayins; Naiv; Teito	Ji Ye June; Jayins; Naiv; Teito	3:04
Total length:					13:37

Track listing of Challenger – Limited edition B
No.	Title	Lyrics	Music	Arrangement	Length
2.	"Get Inside Me"	Kebee; Jone (Papermaker); Yohei; Mamixoxo	Kebee; Tenzo; Jone; Ssam	Ssam; Jone	3:40
Total length:					13:33

Track listing of Challenger – Normal edition
No.	Title	Lyrics	Music	Arrangement	Length
2.	"Kimi no Mama" (君のまま, 'As You Are')	Masahiro Ōchi	Hayato Tanaka; Masahiro Ōchi	Teito (KCKT)	3:53
Total length:					13:46

Track listing of Challenger – Special edition (digital)
No.	Title	Length
1.	"Born to Be Wild"	3:45
2.	"Speed of Light"	3:44
3.	"Get Inside Me"	3:40
4.	"Kimi no Mama" (君のまま, 'As You Are')	3:53
5.	"Design"	3:04
6.	"Tsutaerareru Nara" (伝えられるなら, 'If You Can Tell')	3:04
Total length:		21:10

Track listing of Challenger – Limited edition A (DVD)
No.	Title	Length
1.	"JO1 Challenge"	1:07:26
Total length:		1:07:26

== Charts ==
=== Weekly charts ===
Weekly chart performance for Challenger
Chart (2021)	Peak position
Japan (Oricon)	1
Japan Combined Singles (Oricon)	1
Japan Top Singles Sales (Billboard Japan)	1

=== Monthly charts ===
Monthly chart performance for Challenger
Chart (2021)	Peak position
Japan (Oricon)	4

=== Year-end charts ===
2021 year-end chart performance for Challenger
Chart (2021)	Position
Japan (Oricon)	22
Japan Combined Singles (Oricon)	61
Japan Top Singles Sales (Billboard Japan)	23

== Certifications ==
Certifications and sales for Challenger
Region	Certification	Certified units/sales
Japan (RIAJ)	Platinum	250,000^{^}
^{^} Shipments figures based on certification alone.

== Release history ==
Release dates and formats for Challenger
Region	Date	Label	Format(s)	Edition	Catalog
Japan	April 28, 2021	Lapone Entertainment	CD; DVD	Limited A	YRCS-90189
Japan	April 28, 2021	Lapone Entertainment	CD; photo booklet	Limited B	YRCS-90190
Japan	April 28, 2021	Lapone Entertainment	CD	Normal	YRCS-90191
Various	April 28, 2021	Lapone Entertainment	Download; streaming	Special	—N/a
