= Kizuna (album) =

- Normal edition cover

Studio album by JO1
- Released: May 25, 2022
- Recorded: 2021–2022
- Genre: J-pop
- Length: 42:03 (Limited edition A); 41:50 (Limited edition B); 41:39 (Anime edition); 45:00 (Normal and Fan Club edition); 60:04 (Special edition)
- Language: Japanese
- Label: Lapone Entertainment

JO1 chronology
The Star (2020)	Kizuna (2022)	Equinox (2023)

Alternative cover
- Anime edition cover featuring JO1 members drawn by artists from Lay-duce

Singles from Kizuna
- 1. "Challenger" Released: April 28, 2021; 2. "Stranger" Released: August 18, 2021; 3. "Wandering" Released: December 15, 2021

Kizuna (Japanese: 絆, lit. 'bond', stylized as KIZUИA or in all caps) is the second studio album by the Japanese boy band JO1. It includes selected songs from their past EP singles, Challenger, Stranger, and Wandering. Lapone Entertainment released the album in five physical editions on May 25, 2022, while the digital version was available two days earlier, with the Japan Hot 100 number-one song "With Us" serving as the main promotional single. The album features frequent collaborators like Full8loom, Alive Knob, Teito, Score, and Megatone, as well as new contributors like Lee Woo-min (Collapsedone), Justin Reinstein, Purple Night, UTA, among others.

Kizuna was preceded by two promotional digital singles, "Dreamer" and "Move the Soul", as well as a six-day long out-of-home advertising campaign at Shinjuku Station, the world's busiest station. JO1 held two live events and promoted the album on M Countdown and Idol Radio in South Korea. They also embarked on a 13-show eponymous arena tour in five cities from September to October 2022.

The album was the group's first to debut at number one on both the Oricon Albums Chart and Billboard Japan Hot Albums chart. It was certified Platinum by the Recording Industry Association of Japan (RIAJ) for over 250,000 units in shipments.

== Background and release ==
Following a special Christmas live performance at the Tokyo Dome City Hall in December to wrap up the promotion of their fifth EP single, Japanese boy band JO1 announced on January 18, 2022, that their new song "Move the Soul" would serve as the opening theme for the Aniplex's original anime series Fanfare of Adolescence, which premieres on April 2. On February 14, JO1 released "Dreamer", the theme song of their first drama series Short Program. On March 22, JO1 announced the release of their second studio album, Kizuna, on May 25, 2022. The album's theme was described as "recognizing the bond one has with friends after overcoming hardship together".

Kizuna consists of 17 songs and was released in five physical editions. Seven of them were selected from the group's three previous EP singles, while the rest are seven new songs and the three theme songs: "Prologue", "Dreamer", and "Move the Soul". All editions include the promotional single "With Us" and the seven selected songs. The two limited editions and the anime edition each has 12 tracks. The limited edition A comes with a bonus DVD featuring a variety segment titled JO1 What Is Your Kizuna. The limited edition B includes "Dreamer" and a photo book. The anime edition features the Boruto: Naruto Next Generations' ending theme "Prologue" and "Move the Soul", as well as an illustration of JO1 members by Lay-duce as the jacket cover. Both of the normal edition, which comes with a solo poster, and the fan club edition consist of 15 tracks. The digital special edition consisting all 17 songs was released earlier on May 23, 2022.

== Promotion ==
Prior to the release of the album in April 2022, members Ren Kawashiri, Takumi Kawanishi, Sukai Kinjo, Junki Kono, and Sho Yonashiro performed "Bokura no Kisetsu" and "Move the Soul" with a special arrangement on the music YouTube channel The First Take. At the KCON 2022 Premiere in Japan on May 14–15, JO1 performed the two songs as well as "With Us", "Walk It Like I Talk It", "Dreamer", and "Algorithm". From May 16 to May 22, an out-of-home advertising campaign was run on the 45.6-meter-long LED signage of Shinjuku Wall 456 at Shinjuku Station, which was the world's busiest station according to the Guinness World Records. The campaign was preceded with an Instagram Story on the group's official account on May 15, 2022, featuring a circle and the message "we are always one". According to a representative from Lapone Entertainment, the circular shape was chosen as the advertisement's to portray "a sense of unity, stability, and bond".

On the album's release day, JO1 held a commemorative event in front of 400 fans at Tokyo's Toyosu Pit, where they performed "With Us" and "Touch!" and announced their first arena tour, which would visit four cities throughout September 2022. On June 5, 2022, the group performed "With Us", "Walk It Like I Talk It", and "Move the Soul" as the closing act at the MTV Live Match, alongside Fantastics from Exile Tribe, Astro, and W-inds. The group then held a showcase event in front of 500 fans at the KT Zepp Yokohama on June 20. Besides the lead track "With Us", they also performed "Walk It Like I Talk It", "Algorithm", "Touch!", and "Zero".

JO1 started their promotion outside Japan in July with a performance of the Korean version of "With Us" on M Countdown. On August 9, members Ren Kawashiri, Junki Kono, Takumi Kawanishi, and Shion Tsurubo made their first appearance in on MBC's Idol Radio, with special DJs Kino and Yuto from the boy group Pentagon. During the live broadcast, the four members performed "Zero" in front of 200 spectators.

=== Singles ===
Challenger was released as the album's lead single on April 28, 2021. The retro funk-influenced lead track "Born to be Wild" peaked atop the Billboard Japan Hot 100. The single debuted at number one on the Oricon Singles Chart, selling 254,111 copies in its first week.

Stranger was released as the album's second single on August 18, 2021. The single continued JO1's number-one streak on the Oricon Singles Chart, outselling the group's last two singles in its second week. It then became the group's fastest single to sell over 400,000 copies on the Billboard Japan chart at that time. Jung Ho-hyun, who has worked with Wanna One and Exo, produced the single's Japan Hot 100 number-one futurepop EDM lead track "Real". Ryohei Shingu directed the music video, which won Best Dance Video at the 2021 MTV Video Music Awards Japan.

The album's third single, Wandering, was released on December 15, 2021, with double lead tracks, "Bokura no Kisetsu" (僕らの季節, Our Season) and "Prologue". The latter served as the ending theme of anime series Boruto: Naruto Next Generations. The songs peaked at number one and forty-nine on the Japan Hot 100, respectively. Supported by a week-long nationwide out-of-home advertising campaign, titled #Find_the _JO1, Wandering earned the group their highest first-week physical and combined sales to date on the Oricon Charts, surpassing their debut single Protostar. The single was JO1's first release to earn a Double Platinum certification from the Recording Industry Association of Japan (RIAJ) for over a half million units in shipments.

==== Promotional singles ====
The first promotional single "Dreamer" was released as the ending theme of Short Program and described as "a cheering song with impressive lyrics full of hope for the future". It was composed in the key of D-sharp major, with 146 beats per minute and a duration of 4 minutes and 14 seconds. It was composed by Justin Reinstein and the Japanese producing team 7th Avenue. The music video, which features scenes from the series, was released the next day on February 15, 2022. The song peaked at number 32 on the Oricon Combined Singles Chart, making it the group's first non lead-track that entered the chart. It also peaked at number 35 on the Japan Hot 100.

"Move the Soul" was released digitally on April 3, 2022, as the opening theme of Fanfare of Adolescence, followed by the performance and dance practice videos. The song was described as having a fast-paced melody and high-pitched vocals, which "connects the story of the anime's main characters and the path of JO1 so far", and was dedicated for people "who push towards their dream". Composed in the key of B minor, the song was produced by the South Korean-Japanese producing team Purple Night. It debuted at number 19 and 16 on the Japan Hot 100 and Oricon Combined Singles Chart, respectively. On April 20, the song was performed by Ren Kawashiri, Takumi Kawanishi, Sukai Kinjo, Junki Kono, and Sho Yonashiro on the music YouTube channel The First Take. A special music video was released on June 16, 2022, as part of the group's collaboration project with the Japan Racing Association.

The album's lead track and main promotional single, "With Us", was released on May 2, 2022, followed by the music video the next day. In line with the album's theme, the song carries the message of "let's walk with us forever, even if there are difficulties" and expresses the determination to "see the same scenery at the top". Composed by Lee Woo-min (Collapsedone) and Justin Reinstein in the key of F-sharp major, The song debuted at number 17 and 15 on the Japan Hot 100 and Oricon Combined Singles Chart, respectively. It was performed live for the first time at the KCON 2022 Premiere held on May 14–15, followed by appearances on Music Blood, Venue101, and CDTV Live Live. The song was also performed at the 2022 Sanrio Fes on June 16, 2022.

=== Concert tour ===
To support the promotion of Kizuna, JO1 embarked on their first eponymous arena tour. They visited five cities in Japan, with a total of 13 shows from September 3 to October 23, 2022, with a live streaming for the show in Fukuoka. The tour was entirely supported by a live band and amassed a total of 110,000 audience in attendance. The Blu-ray/DVD recording of the last show was released on March 15, 2023.

== Commercial performance ==
Kizuna debuted at number one on the Oricon Daily Albums Chart, selling 213,592 copies, and went on to become the group's first album to top the weekly chart with an estimated sales of 261,000 copies. The album was certified Platinum by the Recording Industry Association of Japan for shipments of over 250,000 physical units. It also debuted at number one on the Billboard Japan Hot Albums, topping both the download and sales component charts with over 300,000 copies sold in its first week, resulting to JO1's first number-one position on the Japan Artist 100. Kizuna's placed it third and fifth on the Mid-Year Top Album Sales and Hot Albums chart, respectively. By the end of 2022, the album had sold 333,607 physical copies, placing it tenth on the Billboard Japan's annual album sales chart.

== Track listing ==
Track listing of Kizuna – Limited edition A (CD)
No.	Title	Lyrics	Music	Arrangement	Length
1.	"With Us"	Mion Yano; Minami; Yumi Miyashiro	Lee Woo-min (Collapsedone); Justin Reinstein	Lee Woo-min; Justin Reinstein	3:10
2.	"Touch!"	Junki Kono; Jinli (Full8loom)	Jinli; Gloryface (Full8loom); Keejun (Full8loom)	Keejun; Gloryface	3:38
3.	"Zero"	Skinner Box; Sunhee (Purple Night); Teyu; Donguri Ameno; Miyashiro	Skinner Box	Skinner Box	3:15
4.	"Algorithm"	Purple Night; Yohei	Purple Night	Purple Night	3:55
5.	"Ryūseiu" (流星雨, 'Meteor Shower')	Stainboys; Kim Ji-hee (Alive Knob); Kim Su-yeun (Alive Knob); Yoske; Yohei	Yeul (1by1); Yoske; Lee Min-young (Eastwest)	Yeul; Lee Min-young	3:57
6.	"Real"	Jung Ho-hyun (e.one); Yhanael	Jung Ho-hyun	Jung Ho-hyun	3:14
7.	"Design"	Yohei	Yohei; Jung Ho-hyun (e.one); Dono	Jung Ho-hyun	3:04
8.	"Bokura no Kisetsu" (僕らの季節, 'Our Season')	Yoske; Kim Mi-ryang (Alive Knob); Baek Joo Yeun (Alive Knob)	Lee Min-young; Yoske; Yeul	Lee Min-young; Yeul	3:31
9.	"Stay"	Jinli	Gloryface; Jinli; Yuka (Full8loom)	Gloryface; Yuka	3:31
10.	"Kimi no Mama" (君のまま, 'As You Are')	Masahiro Ōchi	Hayato Tanaka; Masahiro Ōchi	Teito (KCKT)	3:53
11.	"Born to Be Wild"	Score (13); Megatone (13); J.rise; Jayins; Yhanael	Score; Megatone	Score; Megatone	3:45
12.	"Never Ending Story"	Kako; Luke (13); Stainboys	Kako; Luke; Daily; Nmore (Prismfilter); Pop Time	Nmore; Daily; Pop Time	3:10
Total length:					42:03

Track listing of Kizuna – Limited edition A (DVD)
No.	Title	Length
1.	"JO1 What Is Your Kizuna"	55:14
Total length:		55:14

Track listing of Kizuna – Limited edition B
No.	Title	Lyrics	Music	Arrangement	Length
1.	"With Us"				3:10
2.	"Ryūseiu" (流星雨, 'Meteor Shower')				3:57
3.	"Walk It Like I Talk It"	Ouow; Th!nk; Billy Carvin; Ameno	Ouow; Th!nk; Carvin; Woojae	Ouow; Woojae	3:03
4.	"Zero"				3:15
5.	"Dreamer"	Anna Kusakawa	Justin Reinstein; 7th Avenue	7th Avenue	4:17
6.	"Bokura no Kisetsu" (僕らの季節, 'Our Season')				3:31
7.	"Kimi no Mama" (君のまま, 'As You Are')				3:53
8.	"Real"				3:14
9.	"Never Ending Story"				3:10
10.	"Born to Be Wild"				3:45
11.	"Stay"				3:31
12.	"Design"				3:04
Total length:					41:50

Track listing of Kizuna – Anime edition
No.	Title	Lyrics	Music	Arrangement	Length
1.	"With Us"				3:10
2.	"Love & Hate"	Mirror Boy; Ellie Love; D.ham; Mun Hanmiru	D.ham; Mun Hanmiru; Mirror Boy	Mirror Boy; D.ham; Mun Hanmiru	3:33
3.	"Touch!"				3:38
4.	"Move the Soul"	Purple Night	Purple Night	Purple Night	3:33
5.	"Prologue"	Yohei; UTA	UTA	UTA	3:37
6.	"Design"				3:04
7.	"Never Ending Story"				3:10
8.	"Born to Be Wild"				3:45
9.	"Stay"				3:31
10.	"Bokura no Kisetsu" (僕らの季節, 'Our Season')				3:31
11.	"Kimi no Mama" (君のまま, 'As You Are')				3:53
12.	"Real"				3:14
Total length:					41:39

Track listing of Kizuna – Normal and Fan Club edition
No.	Title	Length
1.	"With Us"	3:10
2.	"Zero"	3:15
3.	"Touch!"	3:38
4.	"Walk It Like I Talk It"	3:03
5.	"Love & Hate"	3:33
6.	"Ryūseiu" (流星雨, 'Meteor Shower')	3:57
7.	"Algorithm"	3:55
8.	"Move the Soul"	3:33
9.	"Real"	3:14
10.	"Kimi no Mama" (君のまま, 'As You Are')	3:53
11.	"Bokura no Kisetsu" (僕らの季節, 'Our Season')	3:31
12.	"Stay"	3:31
13.	"Born to Be Wild"	3:45
14.	"Never Ending Story"	3:10
15.	"Design"	3:04
Total length:		45:00

Track listing of Kizuna – Special edition (digital)
No.	Title	Length
1.	"With Us"	3:10
2.	"Zero"	3:15
3.	"Walk It Like I Talk It"	3:03
4.	"Touch!"	3:38
5.	"Love & Hate"	3:33
6.	"Algorithm"	3:55
7.	"Ryūseiu" (流星雨, 'Meteor Shower')	3:57
8.	"Move the Soul"	3:33
9.	"Dreamer"	4:17
10.	"Born to Be Wild"	3:44
11.	"Real"	3:14
12.	"Bokura no Kisetsu" (僕らの季節, 'Our Season')	3:31
13.	"Design"	3:04
14.	"Kimi no Mama" (君のまま, 'As You Are')	3:53
15.	"Stay"	3:31
16.	"Never Ending Story"	3:10
17.	"Prologue"	3:37
Total length:		1:00:04

== Credits and personnel ==
Credits are adapted from the album's liner notes. Track listing is based on Kizuna special edition.

Musicians and vocals

- JO1 – vocals (all tracks)
- Lee Woo-min (Collapsedone) – computer programming (track 1), piano (1), synthesizer (1), acoustic guitar (1), bass (1), digital editing (1)
- Justin Reinstein – computer programming (1), piano (1), synthesizer (1),
- Heon-seo – chorus (2),
- Choi Hye-sun – drum (2), piano (2), synthesizer (2)
- Seo Ye-ji – bass (2), keyboard (2), guitar (2)
- Esbee – chorus (3), drum (3), bass (3), piano (3), keyboard (3) synthesizer (3), guitar (3)
- think – chorus (3)
- Woo-jae – drum (3), bass (3), piano (3), keyboard (3) synthesizer (3), guitar (3)
- O'neal – drum (3), bass (3), piano (3), keyboard (3) synthesizer (3), guitar (3)
- Last.P – drum (3), bass (3), piano (3), keyboard (3) synthesizer (3), guitar (3)
- Lee Ji-won – chorus (4,15)
- Kim Ju-yeong – chorus (4,15)
- Jang Jun-ho – drum (4,15), bass (4,15), piano (4,15), keyboard (4,15), synthesizer (4,15)
- Lim Ki-jun – drum (4), bass (4), piano (4), keyboard (4), synthesizer (4)
- Koh Myoung-jae – guitar (4,15)
- Mun Hanmiru – chorus (5), keyboard (5)
- Mirror Boy – drum (5), bass (5), piano (5), guitar (5)
- D.ham – synthesizer (5)
- Purple Night – chorus (6,7), drum (6,7), bass (6), piano (6), keyboard (6), synthesizer (6,8), guitar (6), MIDI programming (8), electric piano (8)
- Mook – chorus (7,12)
- Lee Min-young (Eastwest) – drum (7,12), bass (7,12), guitar (12)
- Yeul (1by1) – drum (7,12), piano (7,12), synthesizer (7,12)
- Lee Tae-wook – guitar (7,9,10)
- Masataka Hirota – chorus (9)
- Funk Uchino – strings director (9)
- Lee Ji-su - chorus (10)
- Score (13) – drum (10), piano (10)
- Kim Byung-seok – bass (10), keyboard (10)
- Dono – chorus (11,13)
- Jung Ho-hyun – keyboard (11,13)
- Masahiro Ōchi – chorus (14)
- Teito – drum (14), bass (14), synthesizer (14)
- Park Joong-hun – piano (9,14), keyboard (14)
- Jkun – guitar (14)
- On the string – strings (9,14)
- Nile Lee – strings arrangement (9,14)
- Kim Ga-yeong – bass (15), keyboard (15), synthesizer (15)
- Luke – chorus (16)
- Pop time – keyboard (16)
- Daily – keyboard (16)
- Nmore (Prismfilter) – keyboard (16)
- Kitae Park (Prismfilter) – guitar (16)
- UTA – MIDI programming (17), drum (17), electric piano (17)
- Yohei – chorus (17)

Technical

- Tatsuya Kawakami – recording (1,2,4,6,7,9)
- Yuki Takeuchi – recording (3,5,12,16)
- Shin Bong-won – recording (7), mixing (1,7,12)
- Shiota Osamu - recording (8,11,15,17)
- Kim Min-hee – recording (10,13,14)
- Sora Tamiya – chorus recording (9)
- Skinner Box – digital editing (2)
- Lee Chang-hoon – digital editing (3,9,16)
- Full8loom – digital editing (4)
- Mirror Boy – digital editing (5)
- Mun Hanmiru – digital editing (5)
- Purple Night – digital editing (6,8)
- Lee Min-young (Eastwest) – digital editing (7,12)
- Kamata Masato – digital editing (8,17), mixing (8,17)
- Jeong Yoo-ra – digital editing (10,14,15)
- Jung Hyo-hyun – digital editing (11,13)
- UTA – digital editing (17)
- Gu Jong-pil – mixing (2,6,9,10,14,15)
- Master Key – mixing (3)
- Uncle Joe – mixing (4,11,13)
- Park Gyeong-seon – mixing (5)
- Anchor – mixing (16)
- Kang Dong-ho – asst. mixing (4)
- Jeon Bu-yeon – asst. mixing (13)
- Kwon Nam-woo – mastering (1—7,9—16)
- Morisaki Masato - mastering (8,17)

Locations

- Alive Recording Studio – recording
- Sound Valley – recording
- GLAB Studios – recording, mixing
- Sony Music Studios – recording
- 821 Sound – recording, mixing, mastering
- Studio Fine – recording
- Seoul Studio – recording
- Prime Sound Studio Form – recording
- Klang Studio – mixing
- JoeLab – mixing
- Boost Knob – mixing
- Studio Vision – mixing, digital editing
- Prismfilter Mix Lab – mixing
- Artisans Mastering – mastering
- Kwang Sound – vocal editing

Visual and design

- Ahmi (Studio Muet) – album design
- Roh Yun-ah (Studio Muet) – album design
- Min In-hong – style director
- Hirohisa Nakano – photographer
- Pepe Yurie – photographer (bonus photo)
- Kazuma Tsujimoto – photographic assistant
- Masanobu Nishiguchi (Crea Leaf) – retouch
- Kazue Sudo (LiNK-UP) – retouch
- Reiko Goto (R.mond inc) – art set designer
- Masahiro Ujie (Malivue Inc.) – creative coordinator
- Koji Nakao(Malivue Inc.) – creative coordinator
- Kaede Osawa (Malivue Inc.) – creative coordinate assistant
- Masasaki Ida – wardrobe
- Ko Fukuchi – wardrobe
- Makato Okuno – hair & make–up
- Mika Sasaki – hair & make–up
- Yuko Tamura – hair & make–up
- Sayuri Nishio – hair & make–up
- Akane Komoto – hair & make–up
- Seika Shimada – hair & make–up
- Mihawkback – choreography (1,3)
- Team Same – choreography (1,5)
- Jong Young (The BIPS) – choreography (6)
- Sung-chan – choreography (3)

== Charts ==
=== Weekly charts ===
Weekly chart performance for Kizuna
Chart (2022)	Peak position
Japanese (Oricon)	1
Japanese Combined Albums (Oricon)	1
Japanese Hot Albums (Billboard Japan)	1

=== Year-end charts ===
2022 year-end chart performance for Kizuna
Chart (2022)	Position
Japanese Albums (Oricon)	12
Japanese Combined Albums (Oricon)	15
Japanese Hot Albums (Billboard Japan)	14

== Certifications ==
Certifications and sales for Kizuna
Region	Certification	Certified units/sales
Japan (RIAJ)	Platinum	250,000^{^}
^{^} Shipments figures based on certification alone.

== Release history ==
Release dates and formats for Kizuna
Region	Date	Label	Format	Edition	Catalog
Various	May 23, 2022	Lapone Entertainment	Download; streaming	Special	—N/a
Japan	May 25, 2022	Lapone Entertainment	CD; DVD	Limited A	YRCS-95107
Japan	May 25, 2022	Lapone Entertainment	CD; photo book	Limited B	YRCS-95108
Japan	May 25, 2022	Lapone Entertainment	CD; solo poster	Normal	YRCS-95109
Japan	May 25, 2022	Lapone Entertainment	CD	Anime	YRCS-95110
Japan	May 25, 2022	Lapone Entertainment	CD	Fan Club	YRCF-91005
