= Wandering (EP) =

- Normal and digital special edition cover

Single by JO1

from the album Kizuna
- Language: Japanese
- A-side: "Bokura no Kisetsu"; "Prologue"
- Released: December 15, 2021
- Recorded: 2021
- Genre: J-pop
- Length: 13:26 (Limited edition A); 13:35 (Limited edition B); 13:58 (Normal edition); 14:52 (Anime edition); 24:27 (Special edition)
- Label: Lapone Entertainment
- Producers: Lee Min-young; Yeul (1by1); UTA; Nmore (Prismfilter); Daily; Pop Time; Nthonius; Jung Ho-hyun (e.one); Gloryface (Full8loom); Harry (Full8loom); Zaydro

JO1 singles chronology
"Stranger" (2021)	"Wandering" (2021)	"Midnight Sun" (2022)

Alternative cover
- Anime edition cover featuring characters from Boruto: Naruto Next Generations

Music video
- "Bokura no Kisetsu" on YouTube
- "Prologue" (studio ver.) on YouTube

Wandering (stylized in all caps) is an extended play (EP) marketed as the fifth single of Japanese boy band JO1. It served as the third single for their second studio album, Kizuna (2022), and is the group's first single with double lead tracks, "Bokura no Kisetsu" (僕らの季節, Our Season) and "Prologue". The latter was used as the ending theme song for the anime series Boruto: Naruto Next Generations. The EP single features seven songs and was released digitally by Lapone Entertainment on December 13, 2021, with four physical editions following on December 15, 2021. It features contributions from Japanese and South Korean producers, including Alive Knob, UTA, Full8loom, among others.

Prior to the release, two B-side tracks were made available as a digital single. "Run&Go" was released on September 15 as the theme song of Kit Kat Japan commercial, while "We Alright" was released on December 6. Wandering became JO1's fifth single that topped the Oricon Singles Chart and their first single to sell over a half million copies in its first week, according to Billboard Japan. It is also JO1's first release to be certified Double Platinum by the Recording Industry Association of Japan (RIAJ).

== Background and release ==
On September 1, 2021, two weeks after releasing their fourth EP single, JO1 announced that they would release a new song titled "Prologue" the next day for the anime series Boruto: Naruto Next Generations. Two weeks later, "Run&Go" was released as part of Kit Kat Japan's marketing. On October 9, Lapone Entertainment announced that member Sukai Kinjo, who had missed the group's first live performance at the KCON World Premiere: The Triangle, a joint concert with other Produce 101 Japan subsequent groups, would suspend his activities due to an adjustment disorder and that the group would continue as ten members. The next day, JO1 announced the release of their fifth EP single, Wandering, on December 15. It featured double lead tracks, "Bokura no Kisetsu" (僕らの季節, Our Season) and "Prologue". They also mentioned that, Kinjo was able to participate in the recording of the single before his break, with the exception of the song "Oasis".

Wandering carries the message of "It's okay to rest, it's okay to stand still; let's move forward slowly". The EP single includes a total of seven songs and was released in five editions: a digital special edition and four physical editions. The anime edition features characters from Boruto on its cover. Each physical edition contains four tracks, with "Bokura no Kisetsu" and "Prologue" being the common tracks. The limited edition A comes with a DVD bundle featuring a variety segment titled JO1: Find the Memory. The limited edition B and the normal edition come with a photo booklet and a CD only, respectively. The special edition includes all songs in the EP single.

== Lead tracks ==
The first lead track, "Bokura no Kisetsu", is described as a "lyrical and gentle winter song". It was written in the key of G-sharp major, with 113 beats per minute and a running time of 3 minutes and 31 seconds. The song was pre-released on November 22, 2021, and the music video was released two days later. It was directed by Hidejin Kato, who had collaborated with the group on performance videos for "Icarus" and "Freedom" from their previous single. The song debuted at number 22 on the Billboard Japan Hot 100 and 21 on the Oricon Combined Singles Chart, before eventually peaked atop both charts following the single release. On December 1, "Bokura no Kisetsu" made its television debut during the annual FNS Music Festival. JO1 then performed the song at the 2021 MTV Video Music Awards Japan and the 2021 Mnet Asian Music Awards, where they won the Best Dance Video for their previous lead track, "Real", and the Best Asian Artist (Japan) award, respectively. The song was also performed in several music shows, including Shibuya Note, Utacon, and Music Fair.

The second lead track "Prologue" is described as a medium-tempo ballad that expresses the idea that "it's okay to be slow, it's okay to stop, it's okay to hold hands and start walking together, and that determination marks the beginning of our journey". The song was produced by Japanese producer UTA, who has worked with artists such as BTS, TVXQ, Exile, Koda Kumi, and others. The song was composed in the key of F major, with 94 beats per minute and a running time of 3 minutes and 37 seconds. "Prologue" debuted at number 49 on the Billboard Japan Hot 100 and spent for six weeks on the Hot Animation chart. A studio version video for the song was released on December 10 as part of a week-long celebration of the group's second anniversary.

== Promotion ==
JO1 started the promotion for Wandering by debuting "Run&Go" at the Best Hits Kayousai on November 11, 2021, around two months after the song's digital release. Aside "Run&Go", three other songs from the single, "Bokura no Kisetsu", "Prologue", and "Never Ending Story", were performed for the first time at the group's first live concert, Open the Door, held at the Makuhari Messe on November 19–21. JO1 later released performance videos for "We Alright" and "Run & Go", directed by Daisuke "Nino" Ninomiya.

On December 24, JO1 held a special Christmas live for the single at the Tokyo Dome City Hall. A total of 400 fans were invited to the event via lottery among Wandering purchasers. The group performed "Prologue", "We Alright", "Bokura no Kisetsu" as well as "Happy Merry Christmas" from their first studio album The Star. The next day, JO1 opened an exhibition at the Gallery AaMo in Tokyo Dome City Hall, that would run until January 25, 2022, to mark the single release and the group's second anniversary. Starting from December 15,"Bokura no Kisetsu" was served as the background music for the Tokyo Dome City Hall's main tree winter illumination.

=== #Find_the_JO1 campaign ===
#Find_the_JO1 is an out-of-home advertising campaign launched by JO1 and Lapone Entertainment across 47 prefectures in Japan, with one location in each prefecture except Aichi, which had two, starting from December 6, 2021. On December 2, JO1's official Twitter account posted a mysterious tweet consisting the hashtag, the date "2021.12.6 -", and an image of 48 mysterious codes, which fans assumed they were coordinate numbers of train stations throughout Japan. Three days later, an image of colored triangles spread in 48 over a map of Japan was revealed, with eleven of the triangles representing the official colors of JO1 members and indicated their hometowns. Fans had been posting tweeting with the hashtag and sending images of the advertisements from various areas since the early morning of December 6, causing the hashtag trended on Twitter. The most notable location was Kurihama Station in Kanagawa, with the station code JO1. The black lines on the posters sparked many theories among fans, who began to discuss its meaning. The black lines were actually a part of the group's message to fans, which could be read if the posters were arranged based on the order of the lyrics on them. On December 11, all advertisements were up, and an image of the completed messagd, "we are always one" (ぼくたちは、いつでもひとつ, bokutachi wa itsumademo hitotsu), was shared on the group's official Twitter.

According to Advertimes, the campaign was created with the idea of "JO1 visiting fans in 47 prefectures who were unable see them due to the COVID-19 pandemic". Advertising companies Dentsu and Ad Brain were in charge of the planning and production. In interview with Natalie, a representative of Lapone Entertainment explained that the campaign was made to expressed the group's and their gratitude to fans for their support and warm messages following the announcement of Kinjo's absence. They also revealed that the "we" in the message had meant JO1, fans, and Kinjo, who was temporarily not together with them.

== Commercial performance ==
Wandering debuted at number one on the Oricon Daily Singles Chart, selling 298,106 copies sold, and went on to become the group's fifth consecutive number-one on the weekly chart with over 430,000 copies sold. It earned JO1 their biggest first-week physical and combined sales to date, surpassing the debut single Protostar. The single also set a new personal record on the Billboard Japan Top Singles Sales, topping the chart with over a half million copies sold in its first week, and later became JO1's first single to be certified Double Platinum by the Recording Industry Association of Japan. Due to its release date didn't fall within the aggregation period in 2021, Wandering ranked in sixth place on the Billboard Japan's mid-year single sales chart in 2022, with 533,632 physical copies sold.

== Track listing ==
"Bokura no Kisetsu" and "Prologue" are common track 1 and 2 for limited edition A, limited edition B, and normal edition.

Track listing of Wandering – Limited edition A
No.	Title	Lyrics	Music	Arrangement	Length
1.	"Bokura no Kisetsu" (僕らの季節, 'Our Season')	Yoske; Kim Mi-ryang (Alive Knob); Kim Ji-hee (Alive Knob); Baek Joo Yeun (Alive Knob)	Lee Min-young; Yoske; Yeul (1by1)	Lee Min-young; Yeul (1by1)	3:31
2.	"Prologue"	Yohei; UTA	UTA	UTA	3:37
3.	"Never Ending Story"	Kako; Luke (13); Stainboys	Kako; Luke; Daily; Nmore (Prismfilter); Pop Time	Nmore; Daily; Pop Time	3:10
4.	"Run&Go"	KZ; Nthonius	KZ; Nthonius	Nthonius	3:08
Total length:					13:26

Track listing of Wandering – Limited edition B
No.	Title	Lyrics	Music	Arrangement	Length
3.	"Never Ending Story"				3:10
4.	"We Alright"	Jung Ho-hyun (e.one); Uno Buckx; Minami	Jung Ho-hyun	Jung Ho-hyun	3:17
Total length:					13:35

Track listing of Wandering – Normal edition
No.	Title	Lyrics	Music	Arrangement	Length
3.	"Oasis"	Jinli (Full8loom); Mion Yano	Gloryface (Full8loom); Jinli; Harry (Full8loom)	Gloryface; Harry	3:33
4.	"We Alright"				3:17
Total length:					13:58

Track listing of Wandering – Anime edition
No.	Title	Lyrics	Music	Arrangement	Length
1.	"Prologue"				3:37
2.	"Bokura no Kisetsu" (僕らの季節, 'Our Season')				3:31
3.	"Oasis"				3:33
4.	"Infinite City"	Cho Yoon-kyung; Park Odal; Kushitamine	Zaydro; Starbuck; June	Zaydro	4:11
Total length:					14:52

Track listing of Wandering – Special edition (digital)
No.	Title	Length
1.	"Bokura no Kisetsu" (僕らの季節, 'Our Season')	3:31
2.	"Prologue"	3:37
3.	"Never Ending Story"	3:10
4.	"Run&Go"	3:08
5.	"We Alright"	3:17
6.	"Oasis"	3:33
7.	"Infinite City"	4:11
Total length:		24:27

Track listing of Wandering – Limited edition A (DVD)
No.	Title	Length
1.	"JO1: Find the Memory"

== Charts ==
=== Weekly charts ===
Weekly chart performance for Wandering
Chart (2021)	Peak position
Japan (Oricon)	1
Japan Combined Singles (Oricon)	1
Japan Top Singles Sales (Billboard Japan)	1

=== Monthly charts ===
Monthly chart performance for Wandering
Chart (2021)	Peak position
Japan (Oricon)	2

=== Year-end charts ===
2022 year-end chart performance for Wandering
Chart (2022)	Position
Japan (Oricon)	17
Japan Combined Singles (Oricon)	29
Japan Top Singles Sales (Billboard Japan)	15

== Certifications ==
Certifications and sales for Wandering
Region	Certification	Certified units/sales
Japan (RIAJ)	2× Platinum	500,000^{^}
^{^} Shipments figures based on certification alone.

== Release history ==
Release dates and formats for Wandering
Region	Date	Label	Format(s)	Edition	Catalog
Various	December 13, 2021	Lapone Entertainment	Download; streaming	Special	—N/a
Japan	December 15, 2021	Lapone Entertainment	CD; DVD	Limited A	YRCS-90202
Japan	December 15, 2021	Lapone Entertainment	CD; photo booklet	Limited B	YRCS-90203
Japan	December 15, 2021	Lapone Entertainment	CD	Normal	YRCS-90204
Japan	December 15, 2021	Lapone Entertainment	CD	Anime	YRCS-90205
