= JO1 =

Japanese boy band

- JO1 in May 2026; L–R: Kawashiri, Kawanishi, Kimata, Kinjo, Kono, Sato, Shiroiwa, Mamehara, Yonashiro

Background information
- Origin: Chiba, Japan
- Genres: J-pop; K-pop
- Works: JO1 discography
- Years active: 2019–present
- Label: Lapone
- Members: Takumi Kawanishi; Ren Kawashiri; Syoya Kimata; Sukai Kinjo; Junki Kono; Issei Mamehara; Keigo Sato; Ruki Shiroiwa; Sho Yonashiro
- Past members: Shosei Ohira; Shion Tsurubo
- Website: jo1.jp

Official logo
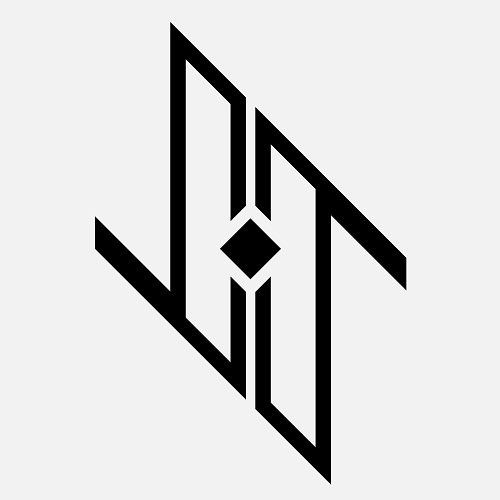

JO1 (Japanese: ジェイオーワン, Hepburn: Jeiōwan) is a Japanese boy band formed through the first season of Produce 101 Japan by Lapone Entertainment. The band is composed of nine members: Issei Mamehara, Ren Kawashiri, Takumi Kawanishi, Ruki Shiroiwa, Keigo Sato, Syoya Kimata, Junki Kono, Sukai Kinjo, and Sho Yonashiro. JO1 was originally formed as an eleven-member group; Shion Tsurubo and Shosei Ohira left the band in 2025 and 2026, respectively. The group is the first permanent Produce 101 winning group.

JO1 debuted on March 4, 2020, and was named one of the Best 5 New Artists at the Japan Gold Disc Award. Since then, they have achieved ten consecutive Oricon number-one singles as well as eight number-one songs and three consecutive number-one albums on the Billboard Japan Hot charts. They are two-time Excellent Work Award winner at the Japan Record Award and recipient of streaming certifications for their songs "Love Seeker", "SuperCali", and "Be Classic" from the Recording Industry Association of Japan (RIAJ). Their other accolades include three MAMA Awards and four MTV Video Music Awards Japan.

== Name ==
The name "JO1" was picked by Lapone Entertainment from recommendations made by the public (dubbed "national producers") via the official website of Produce 101 Japan. It means that "the trainees who pursued their dreams together in Produce 101 Japan will come together and aim for the top of the world". The name was revealed in the final episode of the show.

The official name of JO1's fan club is JAM (Japanese: ジャム), as determined by a vote among members out of over 5,000 suggestions from fans in a YouTube video posted on January 10, 2020. It is derived from the phrase "JO1 And Me" and represents the idea that fans are a force that enhances JO1, similar to jam on bread. The word "JAM" was also chosen for its meaning of "to completely fill a place," which conveys the band's desire to fill live venues with fans.

== History ==
=== 2019: Formation through Produce 101 Japan ===
JO1 was formed through the reality competition show Produce 101 Japan, which was aired primarily on the streaming service Gyao! from September 25 to December 11, 2019. A total of 6,000 participants auditioned for the show, ranging in age from 16 to 30 and not affiliated with any talent agency. The final 11 trainees were picked by viewers from the 101 through online voting and announced during a live television broadcast on TBS. Unlike previous Produce 101 franchise-winning groups, there was no intention of restricting the group's activity after its debut.

Most of the Produce 101 Japan trainees had no experience in the entertainment industry, resulting in JO1 members having varying levels of experience. Ren Kawashiri and Shosei Ohira have previously worked as backup dancers for SMAP, Tomohisa Yamashita, Wanna One, Pentagon, and Exile among others. The latter, Keigo Sato, Syoya Kimata, and Issei Mamehara went to a local dance school; Kimata was also active as a cover dancer and Mamehara was a kid's dance teacher. Ruki Shiroiwa is a former member of Johnny's Jr., the trainee group of Johnny & Associates, and Tsukicro, a voice actor music group, while Shion Tsurubo spent ten months as a trainee at FNC Entertainment. Kawanishi, Kinjo, Kono, and Yonashiro had never received any dance or vocal training.

=== 2020: Debut and The Star ===
JO1 headed to South Korea shortly after the conclusion of Produce 101 Japan to produce their debut single, Protostar, where they went through an "intense" one-month boot camp to strengthen their skills and chemistry as a group. The single was released on March 4, 2020, and debuted at number one on the Oricon Singles Chart with over 300,000 copies sold in the first week, making JO1 the seventh artist to accomplish so with a debut single, while its lead track, "Infinity", reached the top of the Billboard Japan Hot 100. On March 24, JO1 made their first live television appearance on NTV's morning show Sukkiri.

On August 26, JO1 released their second single, Stargazer, with Hui from the South Korean boy band Pentagon co-producing the lead track "Oh-Eh-Oh". Unlike the previous single, the production and training were done remotely due to the COVID-19 pandemic. On September 5, JO1 headlined the 31st Mynavi Tokyo Girls Collection Autumn/Winter 2020 in the Saitama Super Arena.

In November, JO1 released their first studio album, The Star, which debuted in second place on the Oricon Albums Chart and the Japan Hot Albums, trailing only Be by BTS. In December, JO1 made their first appearance at the FNS Music Festival, performing the promotional single "Shine a Light", and held their first live-streaming concert, Starlight, attracting an estimated 120,000 viewers from over 30 countries. JO1 received awards such as the Rising Star Award from the MTV Video Music Awards Japan and the Mnet Asian Music Award for Best Asian Artist. The group was also named one of the Best 5 New Artists at the Japan Gold Disc Award alongside SixTones, Snow Man, NiziU, and Yoasobi for their net sales in 2020.

=== 2021–2022: Open the Door, Kizuna, and first arena tour ===
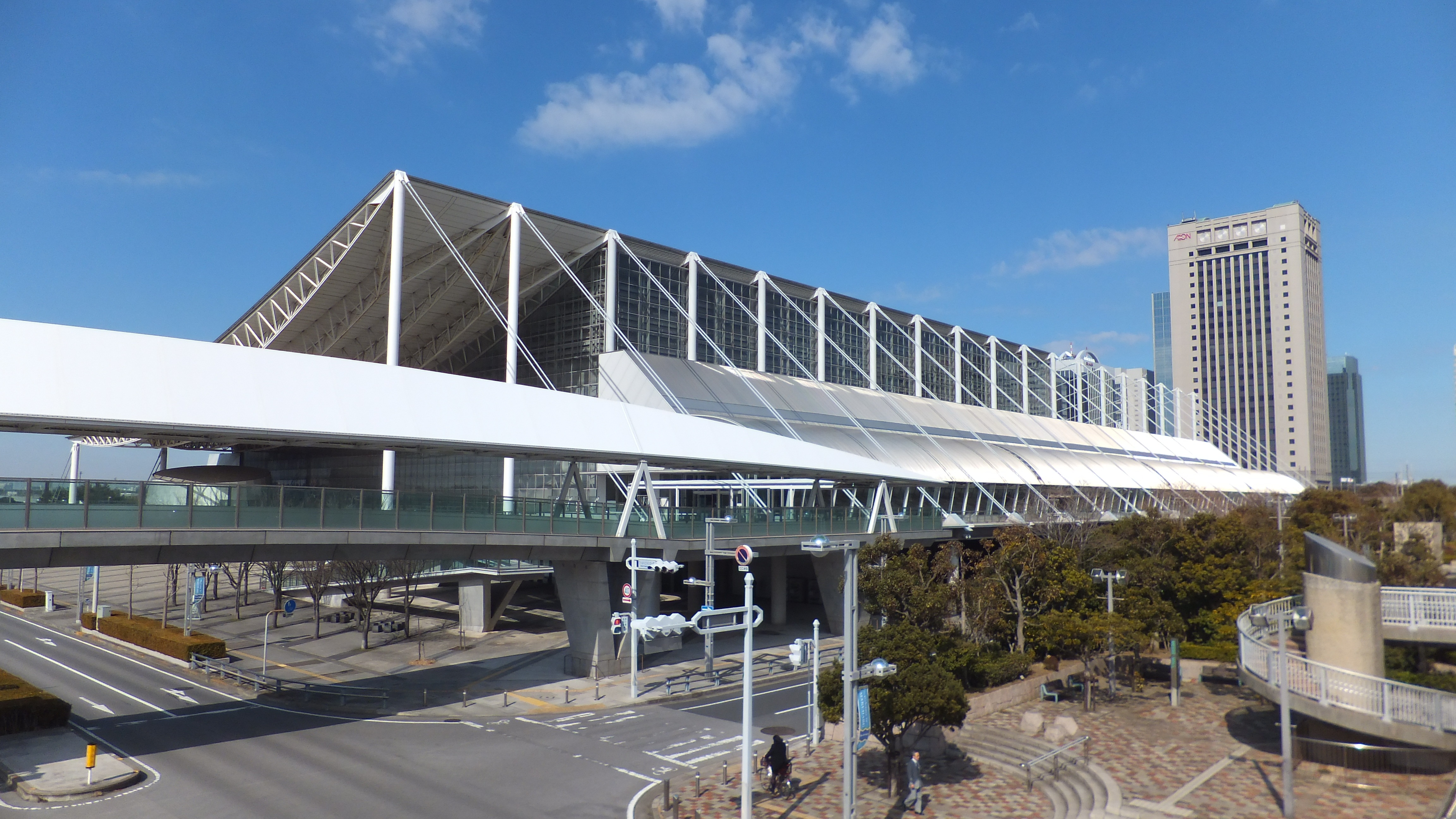
Exterior of the Makuhari Messe (photo taken 2012) where JO1 was formed and held their first live concert amidst the COVID-19 pandemic

In February 2021, JO1 made their first appearance in South Korea on M Countdown and held their second online concert, Starlight Deluxe. Their third single, Challenger, was released on April 28 and became the eleventh best-selling single in the first half of 2021, with "Born to be Wild" topped the Japan Hot 100.

Their fourth single, Stranger, was released on August 18, and it was the group's fastest single to sell 400,000 copies on the Billboard Japan chart. On September 23, JO1 performed at the Pacifico Yokohama joint live concert KCON World Premiere: The Triangle alongside other Produce 101 Japan subsequent groups. It was their first performance in person since their debut due to the pandemic.

To comply with COVID-19 preventive measures, JO1 held their first live concert, Open the Door, at the Makuhari Messe in November 2021, as opposed to their planned national tour. The concert drew 45,000 spectators in total and featured songs from the group's fifth single, Wandering, which became their first single to be certified double platinum by the Recording Industry Association of Japan (RIAJ). The single features "Prologue", the closing theme for the anime series Boruto: Naruto Next Generations.

JO1 released two new songs, "Dreamer" and "Toberu Kara" (飛べるから, I Can Fly), as the theme songs for their first drama series Short Program and documentary film JO1 the Movie: Unfinished - Go to the Top. On April 22, JO1 released the digital single "YOLO-konde", produced by 3Racha of Stray Kids, whose concept development and lyrics writing process were shown on the NHK program This Is JO1: Go to the Dream. In May, JO1 released their second studio album, Kizuna; the group's first number-one album on the Oricon and Billboard Japan charts. It includes "Move the Soul", the opening theme of Aniplex's original anime series Fanfare of Adolescence. JO1 embarked on Kizuna Arena Tour to five cities in September and October 2022, attracting 110,000 people.

=== 2022–2023: Debut on Kōhaku Uta Gassen, Equinox, and first Asian tour ===
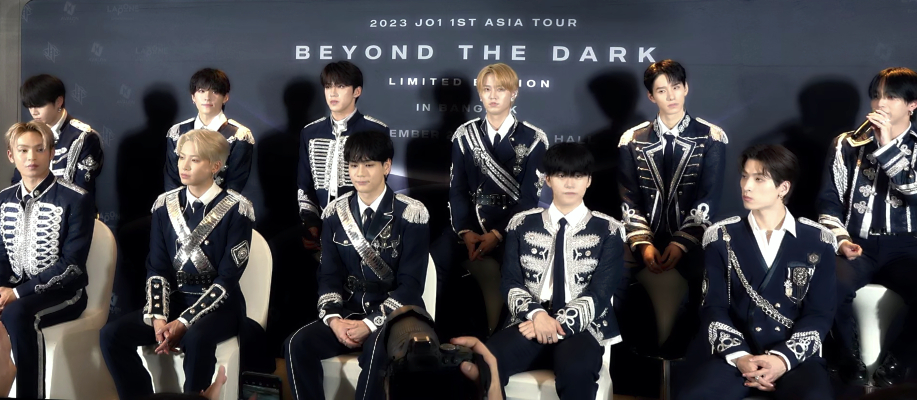
JO1 attending the press conference of the 2023 Beyond the Dark Tour in Bangkok, Thailand

JO1 released their first English song, "All Hours," in June 2022. Their sixth single, Midnight Sun, was released in October and sold 600,000 copies on the Billboard Japan chart in its first week, while the lead track, "SuperCali", spent two weeks in the top six of the Japan Hot 100. By the end of 2022, JO1 ranked high on several Billboard Japan's year-end charts, propelling them to number 25 on the Artist 100 chart. JO1 then made their debut on the NHK's annual New Year's Eve musical show Kōhaku Uta Gassen with "Infinity".

On April 5, 2023, JO1 released their seventh consecutive Oricon number-one single, Tropical Night, featuring "Tiger" as the lead track. JO1 performed the song to open the Hanshin Tigers vs. Hiroshima Toyo Carp match at Hanshin Koshien Stadium. In May, JO1 made their debut at the annual K-pop joint concert Dream Concert in Busan and headlined its Japanese edition the following month alongside Jaejoong and Junsu.

JO1 released their second consecutive number-one studio album, Equinox, on September 20, 2023. It includes the self-produced song "NEWSmile", the theme of the morning news show Mezamashi 8. In August, JO1 embarked on their second arena tour, Beyond the Dark, which included a performance in the Kyocera Dome, attracting approximately 200,000 people. The group also began their first Asian tour in November. On October 20, JO1 released "Eyes On Me" featuring DJ R3hab and made their debut on TV Asahi's prime time music program, Music Station. They are the second non-Johnny & Associates and LDH boy band to perform on the show after public criticism of the former's alleged influence on domestic rival groups' inability to appear on the show emerged. JO1 received the Excellent Work Award at the Japan Record Award in December for "Trigger" and performed "NEWSmile" as the first artist from the white team at the 74th NHK Kōhaku Uta Gassen.

=== 2024–present: First best album, first world tour, and members' departure ===
In January 2024, JO1 released "Your Key" as the opening theme for the anime series Four Knights of the Apocalypse. The song was later issued as the group's first Blu-ray single on March 27. It debuted at number one on Oricon's music DVD/Blu-ray chart. This was followed by the digital releases of "Aqua" and "Happy Unbirthday"; both songs charted on the Billboard Japan Hot 100. On May 29, JO1 released their eighth single, Hitchhiker. It became their first single to sell over 500,000 copies in its debut week on the Oricon chart and received a triple platinum certification from RIAJ. Its lead track, "Love Seeker", earned JO1 their first RIAJ streaming certification and their second Excellent Work Award.

On July 27 and 28, JO1 held a fan appreciation event titled JAM Thanksgiving: Summer Festival at K-Arena Yokohama. From August to September, the group performed at several domestic music festivals for the first time, including Summer Sonic Festival and Rock in Japan. Their ninth single, Where Do We Go, was released on October 2 and became their second single to receive triple platinum certification. To support the release, JO1 launched the Wherever We Are Tour. It began domestically, in four cities in Japan, and continued across six countries in Asia and North America from February to March 2025. The tour concluded with a two-day concert at the Tokyo Dome in April. In total, the tour attracted 250,000 people.

JO1 greeting fans at a mini fan meeting in April 2025

On March 14, 2025, JO1 made their debut on American terrestrial television, with a performance of "Love Seeker" on Good Day New York. On April 2, they released their first greatest hits album, Be Classic, with the track list determined by fan vote. The album became the group's third consecutive release to top both the Oricon and Japan Hot Albums charts. Its title track debuted at number eleven on the Japan Hot 100, while its English version marked JO1's first appearance on the Mediabase US Top 40 Radio Airplay chart. On July 4, JO1 released their second documentary film, JO1 the Movie: Unfinished - Bon Voyage, with the live version of "Bon Voyage" served as the theme song.

JO1 held their first outdoor solo concert to mark their fifth anniversary at the Sea Forest Waterway on October 18–19, 2025. It amassed around 30,000 people and featured 20,000 fireworks. Three days later, the group released their tenth consecutive Oricon number-one single, Handz in My Pocket, with the title track debuted second on the Japan Hot 100. In December, JO1 made their debut appearance in an American music festival, by performing at the Dallas and Los Angeles stop of the iHeartRadio Jingle Ball Tour. On December 31, Shion Tsurubo decided to not renew his contract with the band, after taking five-month hiatus and indicted for online gambling. On May 31, 2026, Ohira followed to end his contract with the band after a six-month hiatus, making JO1 a nine-member band. In April and July, JO1 held their first Dome tour in four cities, Eien (永縁, Eternity), drawing approximately 70,000 people.

In October 2026, JO1 entered the Billboard 200 for the first time with their Dem Jointz-produced US debut extended play (EP), Animal, which was supported by a North American tour to five cities. The band will also release their eleventh single, AAO, in November. Its lead track, "Ignite", was chosen as the opening theme for the fourth season of Tokyo Revengers.

== Members ==
Current members

- Takumi Kawanishi (川西 拓実, Kawanishi Takumi)
- Ren Kawashiri (川尻 蓮, Kawashiri Ren) – performance leader
- Syoya Kimata (木全 翔也, Kimata Shōya)
- Sukai Kinjo (金城 碧海, Kinjō Sukai)
- Junki Kono (河野 純喜, Kōno Junki) – vocal leader
- Issei Mamehara (豆原 一成, Mamehara Issei)
- Keigo Sato (佐藤 景瑚, Satō Keigo)
- Ruki Shiroiwa (白岩 瑠姫, Shiroiwa Ruki)
- Sho Yonashiro (與那城 奨, Yonashiro Shō) – group leader

Former members

- Shosei Ohira (大平 祥生, Ōhira Shosei) (2019–2026)
- Shion Tsurubo (鶴房 汐恩, Tsurubō Shion) (2019–2025)

=== Timeline ===
On October 9, 2021, Sukai Kinjo took a break to receive treatment for adjustment disorder. He resumed his activities on February 14, 2022.

On June 20, 2025, Shion Tsurubo took on an indefinite hiatus after being referred to the Tokyo Metropolitan Police Department on suspicion of online gambling. He was later summarily indicted and fined 100,000 yen for the charge. On October 15, Lapone announced that Shosei Ohira would take a hiatus after "being found violating the agency's regulations". Tsurubo decided to not renew his contract and left the band as of December 31, 2025, while Ohira on May 31, 2026.

== Other ventures ==
=== Endorsements ===
JO1 for the Hot Japan project

JO1 has kept a number of domestic sponsorship partnerships, from national brands, such as ABC-MART, FamilyMart, and Y!mobile, to international ones like Kit Kat, Louis Vuitton, and TikTok. They have also worked for companies in various industries, ranging from the Credit Saison credit card to the Osaka Gas power package plan, as well as for national organizations like the Japan Racing Association and JA Kyosai.

In 2021, JO1 signed a one-year "official beauty partner" contract with YSL Beauty Japan, tripling the fragrance Libre's sales. The following year, YSL Japan named JO1 as the brand's first male ambassador, citing the group's genderless image and enthusiastic fans. In November 2022, JO1 and Sanrio released eleven new characters as the group's alter egos, dubbed JOChum (ジェオチャム, Jeiōchamu). The character designs were based on the group members' original ideas and sketches. In the same year, JO1 was named the ambassador of Hot Japan with JO1, a project that promotes Japan's charms both domestically and worldwide, with the backing of governmental agencies and corporate sectors such as GMO Internet Group, Mitsui Fudosan Group, and ANA X. The project resulted in a YouTube content series and the NHK travel documentary JJJJO1. In 2024, JO1 was appointed as ambassador for the Adidas Japan's line Adidas Sportswear alongside INI. In 2025, JO1 starred in a beef curry TV commercial for Japanese fast food chain Hotto Motto. The group's "high recognition both domestically and internationally" was mentioned as one of the deciding factors in their selection. Yonashiro, Shiraiwa, Kono, Sato, Kawanishi, and Kinjo joined six members of INI to form a unit called JI Blue, which acted as the official ambassadors for the 2026 Japan national football team.

=== Philanthropy ===
JO1 has supported several charities over their career. In March 2021, JO1 and the social platform service Heyhey raised around ¥1.85 million ($17,000) for the recovery of regions affected by the Great East Japan Earthquake ten years prior. A year later, members Sho Yonashiro and Ren Kawashiri, along with other Yoshimoto Kogyo entertainers, filmed a video explaining the importance and side effects of the COVID-19 booster shot with Prime Minister Kishida at his office, easing public concerns about the shot and encouraging people of all ages to get vaccinated.

In response to the wildfires in Los Angeles, California, in January 2025, JO1 released special merch called the JO1 Charity Band on their Wherever We Are world tour, designed by leader Yonashiro. On April 28, 2025, JO1 presented a $50,000 check to the Los Angeles Dodgers Foundation to help their ongoing wildfire relief efforts prior to the group's performance at the club's Japan Heritage Night.

== Discography ==
- The Star (2020)
- Kizuna (2022)
- Equinox (2023)

== Concert tours ==
Japan Tours

- Kizuna Arena Tour (2022)
- Eien (永縁) Dome Tour (2026)

Regional Tours

- Beyond the Dark Tour (2023)
- Animal Tour (2026)

World Tours

- Wherever We Are (2024–2025)

Concerts

- Open the Door (2021)
- JO1 5th Anniversary: Matsuri (2025)

Online concerts

- Starlight (2020)
- Starlight Deluxe (2021)

Fan Meetings

- JAM Thanksgiving: Summer Festival (2024)

== Filmography ==
=== Film ===
List of films, with release year, role and note
Year	Title		Role	Note	Ref.
Year	English	Original	Role	Note	Ref.
2022	JO1 the Movie: Unfinished - Go to the Top	JO1 THE MOVIE『未完成』-GO to the TOP-	Themselves	Documentary	
2025	JO1 the Movie: Unfinished - Bon Voyage	JO1 THE MOVIE『未完成』-Bon Voyage-	Themselves	Documentary	

=== Television ===
List of television programs, with broadcast year, role and note
Year	Title		Role	Note	Ref.
Year	English	Original	Role	Note	Ref.
2020–2021	JO1 House	JO1 HOUSE	Themselves	Reality series; three seasons	
2020	JO1 School	JO1 SCHOOL	Themselves	Episode 0 of JO1 Star Gather TV	
2020	JO1 Star Gather TV	JO1 スターギャザーTV	Themselves		
2020	JO1 the Star: JO1 x NO1 Battle	JO1の星～JO1×NO1バトル～	Themselves		
2021	Isai Future: Utae Mirai no Uta	異才FUTURE うたえミライの歌	Host	Technology non-fiction program	
2021	Toresugi JO1	トレスギJO1	Themselves	Variety special	
2021	Process JO1	PROCESS JO1	Themselves	Documentary series	
2021	Toresugi JO1 2	トレスギJO1 第2弾	Themselves		
2021	Playlist JO1	プレイリストJO1	Themselves	Music talk show	
2022	Short Program	ショート・プログラム	Male protagonists	Anthology series	
2022	This Is JO1: Go to the Dream	This is JO1 〜Go to the DREAM〜	Themselves	NHK special	
2022–2023	JO1CX-TV		Themselves	Variety series; two seasons	
2023	JO1's White Rice is Better Than That	JO1の『そんなことより白飯（シロメシ）だ！』	Themselves	Food corner on TV program N-St	
2023	JJJJO1		Themselves	Travel series	
2023	Music Frontier		Themselves	Music documentary	
2024	Produce JO1	プロデュースJO1	Themselves	Self-produced live performances	
2024	JO1 no Kami Kontentsuzukuri ni Charenji!	JO1の神コンテンツ作りにチャレンジ！	Themselves	Variety show	
2024	JO1 Vacation: Let's Go Hawaii!	JO1 Vacation レッツゴー・ハワイ！	Themselves	Travel series	
2025	KPopped		Themselves	Episode 4	
2025	JO1's Survival Dice	JO1のSURVIVAL DICE	Themselves	Game variety show	

=== Web series ===
List of web programs, with broadcast year, role and note
Year(s)	Title		Role	Note	Ref.
Year(s)	English	Original	Role	Note	Ref.
2022–present	Hi! JO1		Themselves		
2022	JO1 Hell?o Tour	JO1의 HELL?O 투어	Themselves	Shot in South Korea	

=== Radio and podcast ===
List of radio and podcast programs, with broadcast year, network and role
Year(s)	Title	Role	Ref.
2022–present	JO1 All Night Nippon X	Host	
2024–present	JO1 Matcha Time Video Podcast	Host	

== Bibliography ==
=== Audio books ===
List of audio books, with publishing year, name of publisher and ISBN
Title	Year	Publisher	ISBN	Note(s)	Ref.
5-Fungo ni Koi no Mahō ga Tokeru Made―Ichiban Hoshi Mitsuketa (５分後に恋の魔法が解けるまで 一番星見つけた)	2020	Gakken Plus	978-4052052965	Audio drama	
5-Fungo ni Koi no Mahō ga Tokeru Made―Ni Dome no Hatsukoi (５分後に恋の魔法が解けるまで 二度目の初恋)	2020	Gakken Plus	978-4052052972	Audio drama	

=== Photobooks ===
List of photobooks, with publishing year, name of publisher and ISBN,showing chart positions and sales
Title	Year	Publisher	ISBN	Peak chart positions		Sales
Title	Year	Publisher	ISBN	Oricon PB	Oricon Books	Sales
Progress	2021	Wani Books	978-4847083464	1	2	JPN: 65,644
Unbound	2024	Shogakukan	978-4096824443	2	2	JPN: 65,653

== Awards and nominations ==
Name of the award ceremony, year presented, award category, nominee(s) of the award, and the result of the nomination
Award ceremony	Year (Note: Indicates the year of the ceremony. Each year is linked to the article about the awards held that year, wherever possible)	Category	Nominee/work	Result	Ref.
ACC Tokyo Creativity Awards	2024	Promotion/Activation (Category B)	JO1 Mart	Gold	
Asia Star Entertainer Awards	2024	The Best Stage (Japan)	JO1	Won	
Billboard Japan Music Awards	2022	Top Single Sales of the Year	Midnight Sun	Shortlisted	
Billboard Japan Music Awards	2022	Top Albums Sales of the Year	Kizuna	Shortlisted	
The Fact Music Awards	2024	Artist of the Year	JO1	Won	
The Fact Music Awards	2024	TMA Popularity Award	JO1	Won	
iHeartRadio Music Awards	2026	World Artist of the Year	JO1	Nominated	
Japan Gold Disc Award	2021	Best 5 New Artists (Japan)	JO1	Won	
Japan Record Award	2023	Grand Prix	"Trigger"	Nominated	
Japan Record Award	2023	Excellent Work Award (Songs of the Year)	"Trigger"	Won	
Japan Record Award	2024	Grand Prix	"Love Seeker"	Nominated	
Japan Record Award	2024	Excellent Work Award (Songs of the Year)	"Love Seeker"	Won	
Korea Grand Music Awards	2024	K-pop Global Artist Award	JO1	Won	
Line News Awards (Note: Line News Awards are held annually by Line News. The Most Talked People Award is given to seven categories based on the number of articles published on the site, changes in the level of attention from the previous year, pageview numbers, and others.)	2021	Most Talked People Award (Idol)	JO1	Nominated	
Line News Awards	2022	Most Talked People Award (Idol)	JO1	Nominated	
MAMA Awards	2020	Best New Asian Artist	JO1	Won	
MAMA Awards	2021	Best Asian Artist (Japan)	JO1	Won	
MAMA Awards	2022	Favorite Asian Artist	JO1	Won	
MAMA Awards	2025	Favorite Asian Artist	JO1	Won	
MTV Video Music Awards Japan	2020	Rising Star Award	JO1	Won	
MTV Video Music Awards Japan	2021	Best Dance Video	"Real"	Won	
MTV Video Music Awards Japan	2021	Video of the Year (Note: At the MTV Video Music Award Japan, Video of the Year is decided by public voting from the winners of the main categories.)	"Real"	Nominated	
MTV Video Music Awards Japan	2022	Best Live Performance	JO1	Won	
MTV Video Music Awards Japan	2025	Best Asia Group	JO1	Won	
MTV Video Music Awards Japan	2026	Best Dance & Vocal Group Video	"Be Classic"	Won	
MTV Video Music Awards Japan	2026	Video of the Year	"Be Classic"	Nominated	
Music Awards Japan	2025	Best of Listeners' Choice: Japanese Song	"Love Seeker"	Nominated	
Music Awards Japan	2025	Oshi-Katsu Request Artist of the Year	JO1	Nominated	
Music Awards Japan	2026	Best of Listeners' Choice: Japanese Song	"Be Classic"	Nominated	
Music Awards Japan	2026	Oshi-Katsu Request Artist of the Year	JO1	Nominated	
Nippon Haku Bangkok (Note: Memorable Thailand Japan Cultural Award 2025 is an award awarded by the Embassy of Japan in Thailand to commemorate the 10th anniversary of Nippon Haku Bangkok, a comprehensive Japanese exhibition in Thailand. It is presented to individuals who have made significant contributions to the history of cultural exchange between Japan and Thailand.)	2025	Memorable Thailand Japan Cultural Award	JO1	Won	
Oricon Annual Ranking	2020	Total Sales by Artist (Newcomer)	JO1	3rd	
Oricon Reiwa Ranking (Note: Oricon Reiwa Ranking (Reiwa 1–5) summarized and awarded music sales trends for the first five years of Reiwa.)	2024	Total Sales by Artist (Newcomer)	JO1	Shortlisted	
Shogakukan DIME Trend Awards (Note: DIME Trend Awards have been hosted annually by Shogakukan's monthly business magazine DIME since 1988. Awards are given based on votes by more than 26,000 readers, editorial staff, and four final committee members. The Best Character Award is given to a figure who has received the support of many people with the most brilliant performance that year.)	2020	Best Character Award	JO1	Won	
Weibo Account Festival (Note: The Weibo Account Festival is hosted annually by Sina to honor Japanese actors, artists, cultural figures, characters, and companies that are active and influential in China through the social microblogging site Weibo. It is the only overseas version of Weibo Night that is held annually in China.)	2022	Best Male Group Award	JO1	Won	

=== Listicles ===
Name of publisher, year listed, name of listicle, and placement
Publisher	Year	Listicle	Placement	Ref.
Nikkei Trendy (Note: Best Hit Products list has been compiled annually since 1987 by the monthly magazine Nikkei Trendy based on the three factors of sales, novelty, and influence.)	2020	Best 30 Hit Products of 2020	20th	
Twitter Japan	2021	Most Tweeted Celebrity	1st	
Twitter Japan	2021	Most Mentioned Account (Music)	1st	
Twitter Japan	2021	Most Used Hashtag (Music)	1st	
