= Lapone Entertainment =

Japanese entertainment company

Lapone Entertainment Co., Ltd.
- Native name: 株式会社LAPONEエンタテインメント
- Romanized name: Kabushiki-gaisha Lapone Entateinmento
- Type: Joint venture
- Industry: Entertainment; Production
- Genre: J-pop; K-pop
- Founded: May 29, 2019; 7 years ago
- Headquarters: 5-18-21 Shinjuku, Shinjuku City, Tokyo 160-0022, Japan
- Key people: Choi Shin-hwa (CEO); Jang Hyuk-jin (CCO)
- Products: Produce 101 Japan
- Services: Artist management; Entertainment and media planning, production, and distribution; Licensing
- Owners: CJ ENM (70%); Yoshimoto Kogyo (30%)
- Parent: CJ ENM; Yoshimoto Kogyo
- Subsidiaries: Lapone Girls
- Website: lapone.jp

Lapone Entertainment Co., Ltd. (株式会社LAPONEエンタテインメント, Kabushiki gaisha Lapone Entateinmento; Japanese pronunciation: [ɾapone]) is a Japanese management and entertainment company (In this case, a record label), established in May 2019 as a joint venture between South Korean CJ ENM and Japanese Yoshimoto Kogyo. The company operates as a talent agency, entertainment company, and record label under Yoshimoto Music. It produces the reality competition series Produce 101 Japan and manages the series' winning groups as well as graduates from the company's trainee program Lapone Boys & Girls.

== History ==
=== 2019–2023: Establishment, boy groups formation, and Laposta ===
Lapone Entertainment was founded on May 29, 2019, as a joint venture between the South Korean company CJ ENM and the Japanese company Yoshimoto Kogyo, to organize and manage the winning group of the audition program Produce 101 Japan, which was co-produced by the two companies and MCIP Holdings. CJ ENM invested 11.5 billion won (US$9.6 million as of 2019) into the company, while Yoshimoto Kogyo invested 5 billion won (US$4.2 million as of 2019), splitting their shares 7:3. The name "Lapone" is derived from Yoshimoto Kogyo's slogan "laugh and peace" and CJ ENM's "only one". Choi Shin-hwa, former head of Yoshimoto Korea, was appointed as the CEO, while Jang Hyuk-jin from CJ ENM Japan was appointed as the COO. The company specializes in the planning, production, distribution, and sale of various videos and recordings of their artists. They also handle contracting and copyright business related to broadcasting programs, such as television or radio appearances and commercials. Lapone Entertainment also provides a training system where their artists routinely learn singing, dancing, lyrics writing, and composing, as well as receive language lessons between Korean, Chinese, or English. The company makes use of resources from both CJ ENM and Yoshimoto Kogyo to operate. Yoshimoto Kogyo handles the day-to-day management, such as local broadcast recruitment and schedule coordination, while CJ ENM handles the training and music production, though it is not limited to South Korean or Japanese producers only.

On March 4, 2020, the company debuted its first group JO1, which formed through Produce 101 Japan. In 2021, the series was renewed for a second season, which led to the creation of the second boy group INI. In June 2021, Yoshimoto Music announced the formation of a joint venture with Universal Music Japan, causing the company's releases, including Lapone Entertainment which operates under it as a label, to be distributed by Universal Music Japan. However, physical releases by JO1 are still distributed by Sony Music Solutions. In December, Lapone Entertainment introduced and opened recruitment for the trainee program, Lapone Boys & Lapone Girls, which included former contestants of Produce 101 Japan Season 2, Ayuta Fukuda, Ken Hiramoto, Koshin Terao, and Nalu Okubo. The four trainees eventually debuted in the six-piece boy band DXTeen on May 10. In April, Lapone announced to hold its first company joint concert, titled Laposta, at Ariake Arena on May 30-31, 2023.

=== 2023–present: Lapone Girls ===
Lapone subsequently renewed Produce 101 Japan for the third season featuring female trainees under the name Produce 101 Japan The Girls. Premiered in October 2023, the show was produced by NTT Docomo Studio & Live, a new entertainment company formed by NTT Docomo and Yoshimoto Kogyo, and distributed by the former's streaming service Lemino. On February 8, 2024, Lapone established the wholly owned subsidiary Lapone Girls, focusing in developing girl groups, and signed the third season's winners Me:I as its first artist. Four Produce 101 Japan The Girls finalists subsequently formed the label's second girl group, Is:sue.

From January 27 to February 2, 2025, Lapone took over Tokyo Dome City for Laposta 2025. On top of the main three-day concert in Tokyo Dome, Lapone artists also held fan meetings and self-produced solo concerts. In 2026, Lapone renewed Produce 101 Japan for the fourth season titled Produce 101 Japan Shinsekai. The season accepted applicants from any nationalities and global votes, resulting in 12-piece boy group Ko1keyz, who will debut in Japan and South Korea concurrently.

== Artists ==
Company logo until April 2022

Groups

- JO1
- INI
- DXTeen
- Ko1keyz

=== Lapone Girls ===
Groups

- Me:I
- Is:sue

== Concerts ==
List of concerts
Date	Name	Venue	Ref.
May 30–31, 2023	Laposta 2023	Ariake Arena	
January 20–21, 2024	Laposta 2024	K Arena Yokohama	
January 27–February 2, 2025	Laposta 2025	Tokyo Dome City	
