= Kizuna Arena Tour =

2022 concert tour by JO1

- Arena tour by JO1
- Official poster
- Location: Japan
- Associated album: Kizuna
- Start date: 3 September 2022
- End date: 23 October 2022
- No. of shows: 13
- Attendance: 110,000

JO1 concert chronology
- Open the Door (2021); Kizuna Arena Tour (2022); Beyond the Dark Tour (2023)

Kizuna (Note: Kizuna (Japanese: 絆; lit. 'Bond')) Arena Tour (stylized as 2022 JO1 1st Arena Live Tour "Kizuna") was the first concert tour by the Japanese boy band JO1 in support of their second studio album, Kizuna (2022). It began on September 3, 2022, at Aichi Sky Expo in Tokoname and concluded on October 23, 2022, in the Ariake Arena in Tokyo, comprising 13 shows across five cities. The tour met with a positive review and attracted around 110,000 people. The Blu-ray/DVD recording of the last show was released by Lapone Entertainment on March 15, 2023, and topped the Oricon Music DVD & Blu-ray chart.

== Background ==
On May 25, 2022, JO1 released their second studio album, Kizuna, with the theme of "recognizing the bond one has with friends after overcoming hardship together". At the release event, JO1 announced their first arena tour of the same name in support of the album. The tour was the group's first headlining concert with a live audience and all eleven members participating, after having to limit their activities due to the COVID-19 pandemic shortly after debuting in 2020 and Sukai Kinjo's absence from the one-off concert Open the Door in 2021. Initially, the tour was scheduled to visit four cities, with a total of ten shows from September 3 to September 22, 2022. In response to the enthusiasm from fans, three additional shows in Tokyo on October 22-23 and a live stream for the Fukuoka show on September 22 were announced on August 12. The tour was supported by a live band throughout the entire concert.

== Reception ==
Reviewing the last show in the Ariake Arena, Tokyo, for Quick Japan, Akiko Shin praised the group's "seriousness" in their performance. She opined that instead of creating a "perfect show", the group created a performance that "could only be shared at that moment". She also praised the group's experience and composure after seeing them turn a mistake into a joke.

== Set lists ==
=== Original dates ===
The following set list is obtained from the September 22, 2022, show in the Marine Messe Fukuoka. It is not intended to represent all dates throughout the tour.

1. "Move the Soul"
2. "Born to be Wild"
3. "Algorithm"
4. "YOLO-konde"
5. "Walk It Like I Talk It"
6. "Shine a Light"
7. "Monstar"
8. "Dreamer" (Kawanishi, Kono, Mamehara)
9. "Icarus" (Kawashiri, Kinjo, Sato, Shiroiwa)
10. "So What" (Ohira, Kimata, Tsurubo, Yonashiro)
11. "Kimi no Mama"
12. "Zero"
13. "Bokura no Kisetsu"
14. "SuperCali"
15. "Infinity"
16. "La Pa Pa Pam"
17. "Speed of Light"
18. "All Hours"
19. "Oh-Eh-Oh"
20. "GrandMaster"
21. "Real"

Encore

22. Medley ("Dreaming Night", "Touch!", "My Friends", "Run&Go")
23. "With Us"

=== Additional dates ===
The following set list is obtained from the October 23, 2022, show in the Ariake Arena. It is not intended to represent all dates throughout the tour.

1. "Move the Soul"
2. "Born to be Wild"
3. "Algorithm"
4. "YOLO-konde"
5. "Walk It Like I Talk It"
6. "Shine a Light"
7. "Bokura no Kisetsu"
8. "Running" (Kawashiri, Tsurubo, Yonashiro)
9. "Get Inside Me" (Ohira, Kawanishi, Kimata, Kono)
10. "Kungchikita" (Kinjo, Sato, Shiroiwa, Mamehara)
11. "Be With You"
12. "Zero"
13. "Ryūseiu"
14. "SuperCali"
15. "Infinity"
16. "La Pa Pa Pam"
17. "Rose"
18. "Speed of Light"
19. "Oh-Eh-Oh"
20. "GrandMaster"
21. "Real"

Encore

22. Medley ("Dreaming Night", "Stay", "Touch!", "My Friends", "Run&Go")
23. "With Us"

Double Encore

24. "Kimi no Mama"

=== Alterations ===
- There are two sets of unit segment, which were performed alternately between shows. The first set was "Running", "Get Inside Me", and "Kungchikita". The second set was "Dreamer", "Icarus", "So What".
- Starting the last show in Fukuoka, "SuperCali" was added to the set.
- During the additional shows, "Ryūseiu", " Be With You", and "Rose" were added to the set, while "Monstar" and "All Hours" were removed.
- During the last show in Tokyo, "Kimi no Mama" was performed as a double encore.

== Tour dates ==
List of concerts, showing dates, cities, venues and attendance for the Kizuna Tour
Date (2022)	City	Country	Venue	Attendance
September 3	Tokoname (Note: Promoted as Aichi)	Japan	Aichi Sky Expo Hall 2	110,000
September 4	Tokoname	Japan	Aichi Sky Expo Hall 2	110,000
September 10 (two shows)	Osaka	Japan	Maruzen Intec Arena	110,000
September 11	Osaka	Japan	Maruzen Intec Arena	110,000
September 17	Yokohama (Note: Promoted as Kanagawa)	Japan	Pia Arena MM	110,000
September 18	Yokohama	Japan	Pia Arena MM	110,000
September 19	Yokohama	Japan	Pia Arena MM	110,000
September 21	Fukuoka	Japan	Marine Messe Hall A	110,000
September 22	Fukuoka	Japan	Marine Messe Hall A	110,000
October 22 (two shows)	Tokyo	Japan	Ariake Arena	110,000
October 23	Tokyo	Japan	Ariake Arena	110,000

== Recording ==
2022 JO1 1st Arena Tour "Kizuna"
- Normal (Blu-ray) edition cover

Video by JO1
- Released: March 23, 2023
- Recorded: October 23, 2022
- Venue: Ariake Arena
- Genre: J-pop
- Length: 3:20:48 (Normal edition); 4:15:56 (Fan Club edition)
- Language: Japanese
- Label: Lapone

JO1 chronology
2022 JO1 1st Arena Tour "Kizuna" (2023)	2023 JO1 2nd Arena Live Tour "Beyond the Dark – Rise in Kyocera Dome" (2024)

Live performance video
- "Infinity" on YouTube

2022 JO1 1st Arena Tour "Kizuna" is the first live video album by the Japanese boy band JO1. It was released on Blu-ray and DVD by Lapone Entertainment on March 15, 2023, and features the October 23 show of the Kizuna Tour in the Ariake Arena.

Lapone announced the release of the album on January 13, 2023, by publishing the performance of "Infinity" from the concert on their official YouTube account as a teaser. Each format is available in normal and fan club edition, with the latter includes 55 minutes of behind-the-scenes footage.

The album topped the Oricon Music DVD & Blu-ray chart upon its release and sold 50,517 copies in its first week. The album was then made available for streaming on Lemino on July 25, 2024.

=== Track listing ===
All editions
No.	Title	Length
1.	"Move the Soul"
2.	"Born to be Wild"
3.	"Algorithm"
4.	"YOLO-konde"
5.	"Walk It Like I Talk It"
6.	"Shine a Light"
7.	"Bokura no Kisetsu" (僕らの季節, 'Our Season')
8.	"Running"
9.	"Get Inside Me"
10.	"KungChiKiTa" (JO1 ver.)
11.	"Be With You"
12.	"Zero"
13.	"Ryūseiu" (流星雨, 'Meteor Shower')
14.	"SuperCali"
15.	"Infinity" (無限大, Mugendai)
16.	"La Pa Pa Pam"
17.	"Rose"
18.	"Speed of Light"
19.	"Oh-Eh-Oh"
20.	"GrandMaster" (JO1 ver.)
21.	"Real"
22.	"Dreaming Night"
23.	"Stay"
24.	"Touch!"
25.	"My Friends"
26.	"Run&Go"
27.	"With Us"
28.	"Kimi no Mama" (君のまま, 'As You Are')
Total length:		3:20:48

Fan Club edition
No.	Title	Length
1.	"Kizuna Behind"	55:08
Total length:		55:08

=== Charts ===
Weekly chart performance
Chart (2022)	Peak position
Japanese DVD (Oricon)	1
Japanese Music DVD (Oricon)	1
Japanese Blu-ray (Oricon)	1
Japanese Music Blu-ray (Oricon)	1
Japanese Music DVD & Blu-ray (Oricon)	1

=== Release history ===
Release dates and formats for 2022 JO1 1st Arena Tour "Kizuna"
Region	Date	Label	Format	Edition	Catalog
Japan	March 23, 2023	Lapone Entertainment	Blu-ray	Normal Blu-ray	YRXS-80066
Japan	March 23, 2023	Lapone Entertainment	DVD (2 discs)	Normal DVD	YRBS-80316–7
Japan	March 23, 2023	Lapone Entertainment	Blu-ray (2 discs); photo book	Fan Club Blu-ray	YRXF-93030–1
Japan	March 23, 2023	Lapone Entertainment	DVD (3 discs); photo book	Fan Club DVD	YRBF-93039–41
