= Be Classic =

2025 greatest hits album by JO1

- Special edition cover

Greatest hits album by JO1
- Released: April 2, 2025
- Recorded: 2019–2025
- Genre: J-pop
- Length: 59:50 (Limited edition A); 59:34 (Limited edition B); 60:07 (Normal edition); 59:19 (Fan Club edition); 28:41 (Special edition)
- Label: Lapone

JO1 chronology
Equinox (2023)	Be Classic (2025)

Singles from Be Classic
- 1. "Hitchhiker" Released: May 29, 2024; 2. "Where Do We Go" Released: October 2, 2024

Be Classic is the first greatest hits album by Japanese boy band JO1. Celebrating the group's fifth anniversary, the album features overall 45 songs, including songs voted by fans from previous releases, a re-recording of their debut song "Infinity 2025", and a re-release of "Toberu Kara" (飛べるから) with all members. It was released by Lapone Entertainment in four editions on April 2, 2025, and peaked atop the Oricon and Billboard Japan charts. The title track debut at the South Korean show of the Where Do We Go world tour, with the English version marked the group's first appearance on the Mediabase US Top 40 Radio Airplay chart.

== Background and release ==
On January 9, 2025, JO1 announced the release of their first greatest hits album, titled Be Classic. It was said to include the rock arrangement version of their debut song "Infinity", while the rest of the track list would be decided by fans through voting. "Infinity 2025" was later released on March 4 to commemorate the group's fifth debut anniversary.

Be Classic consists of a total of 45 songs across four physical editions. "Toberu Kara" (飛べるから), the theme song of JO1 the Movie: Unfinished - Go to the Top (2022), won the voting and was re-released with voices from all members – Sukai Kinjo was absent from the initial release due to a hiatus. The song is included in all editions, alongside "Infinity 2025", previous singles "Love Seeker" and "Where Do We Go?", and six new songs.

== Singles ==
Hitchhiker was released as the album's lead single on May 29, 2024. It was JO1's first single to sell over 500,000 copies in the first week on the Oricon Chart and earn Triple Platinum certification by the Recording Industry Association of Japan (RIAJ). Its lead track, "Love Seeker", won the Excellent Work Award at the Japan Record Awards, and marked the group's first RIAJ streaming certification.

The second single, Where Do We Go, was released on October 2, 2024. It was the group's ninth consecutive number-one single on the Oricon Chart and second consecutive single to sell over a half million copies in its first week.

The album's title track was released on March 24, 2025, and samples Ludwig van Beethoven's "Symphony No. 5". The song debuted at eleventh on Japan Hot 100 and charted for 16 weeks. Its English version marked JO1's first appearance on the Mediabase US Top 40 Radio Airplay chart. The song earned Gold streaming certification from the RIAJ in September 2025.

== Commercial performance ==
Be Classic debuted at number one on Oricon Daily Albums Chart with 238,722 copies sold. The album became the group's third consecutive number-one on the weekly chart and best selling album in its first week with 290,262 copies sold. Be Classic also topped the Billboard Japan Hot Albums chart, selling 334,084 copies in the first week. It earned the Platinum certification by the Recording Industry Association of Japan (RIAJ) for more than 250,000 copies in shipments.

== Track listing ==
Track one to nine are common for all editions.

Track listing of Be Classic – Special edition (digital)
No.	Title	Lyrics	Music	Arrangement	Length
1.	"Be Classic"	Hiyori Nara; Imaban; Sooyoon; ChAN's	ChAN's; oro; One.Ki; Sooyoon; Isak Alvedahl)	ChAN's; oro	2:39
2.	"EZPZ" (performed by Kawashiri, Sato, Mamehara)	Yohei; Takumi Yumieda; Akta	Shwa; Kieran Davis	Shwa; Davis	2:35
3.	"Hottie with the Hot Tea" (performed by Kawanishi, Kimata, Kinjo)	Kikue; Ryan Shin	808MAL; Shin	808MAL	2:55
4.	"Be There For You" (performed by Yonashiro, Shiroiwa, Kono, Ohira, Tsurubo)	Seion	Lee Min-young; Seion; Coldcow	1by1	3:40
5.	"Bon Voyage"	JO1; Masami Kakinuma	Ren; Junki; Syoya	Yago; Dvii	3:08
6.	"Infinity 2025" (無限大, Mugendai)	KZ; B.O; B.Eyes	KZ; Nthonius; B.O; Kim Seung-soo	Nthonius; Meisobo; KZ	3:17
7.	"Love Seeker"				2:54
8.	"Where Do We Go"				2:37
9.	"Toberu Kara" (飛べるから)				4:56
Total length:					28:41

Track listing of Be Classic – Limited edition A (CD)
No.	Title	Lyrics	Music	Arrangement	Length
10.	"Monstar"				3:24
11.	"Prologue"				3:37
12.	"Venus"				3:18
13.	"Bokura no Kisetsu" (僕らの季節)				3:31
14.	"Born to be Wild"				3:44
15.	"Design"				3:03
16.	"Tsukame (It's Coming)" (ツカメ ～It's Coming～; JO1 ver.)				3:57
17.	"Run&Go"				3:08
18.	"Join Us!!"	Konnyaku Nishino	Hitomi Sano	Jun Suyama; Misato Tsuchiya	3:27
Total length:					59:50

Track listing of Be Classic – Limited edition B (CD)
No.	Title	Length
10.	"Dreaming Night"	3:28
11.	"Blooming Again"	3:44
12.	"Lemon Candy"	3:07
13.	"Romance"	3:56
14.	"Icarus"	3:16
15.	"Touch!"	3:38
16.	"YOLO-konde"	3:25
17.	"Zero"	3:15
18.	"Trigger"	3:04
Total length:		59:34

Track listing of Be Classic – Normal edition (CD)
No.	Title	Length
10.	"Gradation"	3:17
11.	"Phobia"	3:30
12.	"Kimi no Mama" (君のまま)	3:52
13.	"Icy"	3:21
14.	"Shine a Light"	3:16
15.	"Aqua"	3:16
16.	"Get Inside Me"	3:39
17.	"Stay"	3:31
18.	"Happy Merry Christmas" (JO1 ver.)	3:44
Total length:		60:07

Track listing of Be Classic – Fan Club edition (CD)
No.	Title	Length
10.	"Mad in Love"	3:24
11.	"Happy Unbirthday"	3:25
12.	"My Friends"	3:19
13.	"With Us"	3:10
14.	"Ryuusei Iu" (流星雨)	3:57
15.	"Safety Zone"	3:26
16.	"Go"	3:19
17.	"NEWSmile"	3:21
18.	"We Alright"	3:17
Total length:		59:19

Track listing of Be Classic – Limited edition A (DVD)
No.	Title	Length
1.	"Quiz to the Top! Part 1"

Track listing of Be Classic – Limited edition B (DVD)
No.	Title	Length
1.	"Quiz to the Top! Part 2"

Track listing of Be Classic – Fan Club edition B (DVD)
No.	Title	Length
1.	"JO1 One Shot Interview"

== Charts ==
=== Weekly charts ===
Weekly chart performance for Be Classic
Chart (2025)	Peak position
Japanese Albums (Oricon)	1
Japanese Combined Albums (Oricon)	1
Japanese Hot Albums (Billboard Japan)	1

=== Monthly charts ===
Monthly chart performance for Be Classic
Chart (2025)	Position
Japanese Albums (Oricon)	1

=== Year-end charts ===
Year-end chart performance for Be Classic
Chart (2025)	Position
Japanese Albums (Oricon)	16
Japanese Hot Albums (Billboard Japan)	38

== Certifications ==
Certifications and sales for Be Classic
Region	Certification	Certified units/sales
Japan (RIAJ)	Platinum	250,000^{^}
^{^} Shipments figures based on certification alone.

== Release history ==
Release dates and formats for Be Classic
Region	Date	Label	Format	Edition	Catalog
Japan	April 2, 2025	Lapone Entertainment	CD; DVD	Limited A	YRCS-95124
Japan	April 2, 2025	Lapone Entertainment	CD; DVD	Limited B	YRCS-95125
Japan	April 2, 2025	Lapone Entertainment	CD	Normal	YRCS-95126
Japan	April 2, 2025	Lapone Entertainment	CD; DVD	Fan Club	YRCF-91020
Various	April 2, 2025	Lapone Entertainment	Download; streaming	Special	—N/a
