= The Star (album) =

- Normal edition cover

Studio album by JO1
- Released: November 25, 2020
- Recorded: 2020
- Genres: J-pop; house; hip-hop; EDM; R&B; trap
- Length: 48:42 (Limited edition red); 48:55 (Limited edition green); 48:40 (Limited edition blue); 62:53 (Normal edition)
- Language: Japanese
- Label: Lapone Entertainment
- Producers: Eastwest; Yeul (1by1); Score (13); Megatone (13); KZ; Kim Seung-soo; Nthonious; KCKT; D.stus; Holy M; Minit; Hui; Eunsol (1008); Seo Yi-sung; Versachoi; Coach & Sendo; Bae Jae-sok (Solcire); Ouow

JO1 chronology
The Star (2020)	Kizuna (2022)

Singles from The Star
- 1. "Protostar" Released: March 4, 2020; 2. "Stargazer" Released: August 26, 2020

The Star (stylized in all caps) is the debut studio album by Japanese boy band JO1, formed through the reality competition show Produce 101 Japan. It includes all songs from their previous EP singles, Protostar and Stargazer. Lapone Entertainment released the album in four editions on November 25, 2020, with "Shine a Light" serving as the promotional single. It features works by South Korean producers and producing teams, such as KCKT, Coach & Sendo, 13, Hui, Yoske, among others.

To promote the album, the group performed in several awards ceremonies and year-end music shows, and member Junki Kono did two solo performances on the music YouTube channel The First Take. The group also held online concerts Starlight on December 19, 2020, and Starlight Deluxe on February 20, 2021. The concerts drew over 240,000 viewers from 40 countries and regions.

The album debuted at number two on the Oricon Albums Chart and Billboard Japan Hot Albums, just behind BTS's Be. It was certified Gold by the Recording Industry Association of Japan (RIAJ) for over 100,000 units in shipments.

== Background and release ==
Seven months after their debut, on October 5, 2020, JO1 held a press conference at Tokyo's Esports Ginza Studio to announce the release of their first studio album, The Star, and their first online concert, Starlight. In keeping with the theme of their previous release, the album's concept images were unveiled on the same day and featured the members dressed in light-colored star-studded costumes, expressing their "shining selves".

The album was released in four editions on November 25, 2020, with seven new songs as well as all songs from previous EP singles, Protostar and Stargazer. The three limited editions (Red, Blue, Green) each has 15 tracks, including "Starlight", "Shine a Light", and a new song that is unique to each edition. The limited edition Red comes with a bonus DVD called JO1 Party, which is a talk segment with the members. The limited edition Green and Blue come with a photo book and an accordion card, respectively. The normal edition comes with a solo poster and features 19 tracks, including all new songs in the limited editions and JO1 version of Produce 101 Japan's "Yancha Boy Yancha Girl" and "Happy Merry Christmas". It was also released in digital format for streaming and download.

== Promotion ==
To celebrate the album's release, JO1 organized a live stream event on their official YouTube channel that day. They also appeared in a special episode of Music On! TV and released their second official Line sticker set. JO1 later released performance videos for "Safety Zone" and "Monstar", both directed by Naokazu Mitsuishi.

JO1 promoted the album by performing "Shine a Light" in several television shows, including the 2020 FNS Music Festival on December 2, 2020. They also performed it alongside "Infinity" at the 2020 MTV Video Music Awards Japan and the 2020 Mnet Asian Music Awards (MAMA) where they won the Rising Star Award and the Best New Asian Artist, respectively. In December, member Junki Kono performed an acoustic solo rendition of "Infinity" and "Voice" on the music YouTube channel The First Take. Both songs were later released as digital singles on January 13, 2021. On February 25, JO1 made their debut performance in South Korea by appearing on M Countdown. On February 28, JO1 headlined for Tokyo Girls Collection for the second time in a row, performing songs from the album. From November 3 to December 6, 2020, a special exhibition titled JO1 Museum: The Star was held sequentially at six HMV Museums across the country.

=== Singles ===
The album's lead single Protostar was released on March 4, 2020, marking JO1's debut. It was released as an extended play with "Infinity" as the lead track. The single reached number one on the Oricon Singles Chart and Billboard Japan Hot 100 and was certified Platinum by the RIAJ. Earning an estimated 640 million yen, the single helped JO1 become the second best-selling new artist on the Oricon chart in the first half of 2020.

Stargazer was released as the album's second single on August 26, 2020. The single continued the group's number one position on the Oricon and Billboard Japan charts. The music video of its lead track "Oh-Eh-Oh", which was released with the theme of teenagers in distress, portrays members of JO1 fighting against a mysterious group as high school students. Hui of South Korean boy group Pentagon co-produced the song.

The music video for the promotional single "Shine a Light" was released on November 10. Yasuhiro Arafune directed the music video, with "intersecting space-time" as the concept. It depicts the members walking around the same intersection in a fictional city, divided by time and era, with a shining light as the only link between the different timelines. The song peaked at number fifty-eight on the Japan Hot 100.

=== Concerts ===
==== Starlight ====
JO1 1st Live Streaming Concert "Starlight"
- Live-stream concert by JO1
- Venue: Pia Arena MM
- Associated album: The Star
- Date: December 19, 2020
- Duration: 2:20
- Attendance: 120,000

JO1 concert chronology
- Starlight (2020); Starlight Deluxe (2021)

Starlight (stylized as JO1 1st Live Streaming Concert "Starlight") is the first online concert by JO1, held on December 19, 2020, via Pia Live Stream. The concert lasted two hours and twenty minutes and included talk and game segments. It attracted an estimated 120,000 viewers from 30 countries and regions besides Japan, including the United States, Australia, China, South Korea, and Indonesia. The concert was broadcast on TBS' cable television channel TBS Channel 1 on January 31, 2021, featuring an exclusive behind-the-scenes footage and an interview with the members.

The set list for the show was the following:

1. "Shine a Light"
2. "Monstar"
3. "Kungchikita" (JO1 ver.)
4. "GrandMaster" (JO1 ver.)
5. "Happy Merry Christmas" (JO1 ver.)
6. "Yancha Boy Yancha Girl" (JO1 ver.)
7. "Go"
8. "Oh-Eh-Oh"
9. "Tsukame (It's Coming)"

Encore

10. "Be With You"
11. "Infinity"

==== Starlight Deluxe ====
Starlight Deluxe
- Live-stream concert by JO1
- Venue: CJ ENM Studio Center
- Associated album: The Star
- Date: February 20, 2021
- Attendance: 120,000

JO1 concert chronology
- Starlight (2020); Starlight Deluxe (2021); Open The Door (2021)

Starlight Deluxe (stylized as JO1 Live Streaming Concert "Starlight Deluxe") is the second online concert by JO1, held on February 20, 2021. It was live streamed from Paju, South Korea. The show, themed around the group's journey into space, featured a longer set list, a series of spacecraft-themed VCRs, and a live band. It was viewed by more than 120,000 people from 40 countries and regions, including Japan, the United States, Australia, South Korea, Thailand, India, and France. The band versions of "Oh-Eh-Oh" and "Grandmaster" were released as digital singles on August 8, 2021.

The set list for the show was the following:

1. "Shine a Light"
2. "Monstar"
3. "Running"
4. "Go"
5. "Yancha Boy Yancha Girl" (JO1 ver.)
6. "My Friends"
7. "Young" (JO1 ver.)
8. "Voice"
9. "Be With You"
10. "Tsutaerareru Nara"
11. "Safety Zone"
12. "So What"
13. "Grandmaster" (Band ver.)
14. "Oh-Eh-Oh" (Band ver.)

Encore

15. "Tsukame (It's Coming)"
16. "Infinity"

== Reception ==
Azusa Takahashi of Real Sound praised the group's rapid growth, which is visible throughout The Star, particularly in singing. She also stated that one of the album's charms is the amount of possibility shown by the wide range of tastes in the songs. Although some tracks were performed in Produce 101 Japan, she described them as "cohesive while retaining the freshness of the time." Takahashi closed her review by writing that the album is good in showing "factors that makeup JO1 as an artist", which include the bond between members, the "spices" found in the songs due to the members' uniqueness, and gratitude to their fans.

== Commercial performance ==
The Star debuted at number one on the Oricon Daily Albums Chart with an estimated 114,560 copies sold. It eventually peaked at number two on the weekly chart behind BTS' album Be, selling 158,333 copies and earning a Gold certification from the RIAJ. The album also peaked at number two on Billboard Japan Hot Albums and topped the sales component chart on its release week. The album's commercial success also propelled JO1 to third place on Billboard Japan Artist 100. By the end of 2020, the album has sold 173,753 physical copies, placing it at number twenty-one on the Oricon's annual ranking.

Because its release date did not occur within the aggregation period in 2020, The Star ranked number ten on the Billboard Japan album sales chart in the first half of 2021, with 195,255 physical copies sold. It eventually ranked twenty-second on the 2021 Year-End Hot Albums chart.

== Track listing ==
"Starlight", "Shine a Light" and "My Friends" are common track 1, 2 and 15, respectively, for all limited editions.

Track listing of The Star – Limited edition red (CD)
No.	Title	Lyrics	Music	Arrangement	Length
1.	"Starlight"	Yoske; Alive Knob	Lee Min-young (Eastwest); Yoske; Yeul (1by1)	Lee Min-young; Yeul	1:15
2.	"Shine a Light"	Yoske; Alive Knob; Seion	Lee Min-young; Yoske; Yeul	Lee Min-young; Yeul	3:16
3.	"Safety Zone"	Score (13); Megatone (13); Esbee; J.Rise	Score; Megatone	Score; Megatone	3:26
4.	"Infinity" (無限大, Mugendai)	KZ; B.O; B.Eyes	KZ; Nthonius; B.O; Kim Seung-soo	KZ; Kim Seung-soo; Nthonius	3:03
5.	"La Pa Pa Pam"	Young Jay (KCKT); Buggy (KCKT); Ven (KCKT); Rosieblue	Young Jay; Buggy; Ven	Young Jay; Buggy; Ven	3:08
6.	"Running"	Yoske; Seion	Eastwest; Yoske	Eastwest; D.stus; Holy M	3:50
7.	"Oh-Eh-Oh"	Ellie Love; Hui	Minit; Hui; Airair	Minit; Hui	3:04
8.	"So What"	Young Jay; Teito (KCKT)	Young Jay; Teito; Ven	Young Jay	3:07
9.	"Go"	Score; Megatone; Onestar (Monotree); J.Rise; Yhanael	Score; Megatone; Onestar	Score; Megatone	3:19
10.	"Voice" (君の声, Kimi no Koe, 'Your Voice')	Yoske; Alive Knob	Eastwest; Yoske	Eastwest	3:35
11.	"Tsukame (It's Coming)" (ツカメ ～It's Coming～; JO1 ver.)	Kanata Nakamura	Ryan S. Jhun; Andrew Choi; Eunsol (1008); Dawn; Bintage; Seo Yi-sung	Eunsol; Seo Yi-sung	3:57
12.	"Young" (JO1 ver.)	Sun; Uno Buckx; Kaine	Sun; Versachoi	Versachoi	3:24
13.	"GrandMaster" (JO1 ver.)	Coach & Sendo; Hasegawa	Coach & Sendo; Yuki	Coach & Sendo	3:28
14.	"Kungchikita" (JO1 ver.)	Young Jay; Buggy; Ven; Kohway (KCKT); Kanata Nakamura	Young Jay; Buggy; Ven; Kohway	Young Jay; Buggy; Ven; Kohway	3:31
15.	"My Friends"	Sho Yonashiro; KZ; Nthonius	KZ; Nthonius	Nthonious	3:19
Total length:					48:42

Track listing of The Star – Limited edition red (DVD)
No.	Title	Length
1.	"JO1 Party"	59:00
Total length:		59:00

Track listing of The Star – Limited edition green
No.	Title	Lyrics	Music	Arrangement	Length
3.	"Infinity" (無限大, Mugendai)				3:03
4.	"La Pa Pa Pam"				3:08
5.	"Running"				3:50
6.	"Oh-Eh-Oh"				3:04
7.	"So What"				3:07
8.	"Go"				3:19
9.	"Voice" (君の声, Kimi no Koe, 'Your Voice')				3:35
10.	"Tsukame (It's Coming)" (ツカメ ～It's Coming～; JO1 ver.)				3:57
11.	"Young" (JO1 ver.)				3:24
12.	"GrandMaster" (JO1 ver.)				3:28
13.	"Kungchikita" (JO1 ver.)				3:31
14.	"Be with You" (足跡, Ashiato, 'Footprints')	Ouow; Stainboys	Ouow	Ouow	3:39
Total length:					48:55

Track listing of The Star – Limited edition blue
No.	Title	Lyrics	Music	Arrangement	Length
3.	"Infinity" (無限大, Mugendai)				3:03
4.	"La Pa Pa Pam"				3:08
5.	"Running"				3:50
6.	"Oh-Eh-Oh"				3:04
7.	"So What"				3:07
8.	"Go"				3:19
9.	"Voice" (君の声, Kimi no Koe, 'Your Voice')				3:35
10.	"Tsukame (It's Coming)" (ツカメ ～It's Coming～; JO1 ver.)				3:57
11.	"Young" (JO1 ver.)				3:24
12.	"GrandMaster" (JO1 ver.)				3:28
13.	"Kungchikita" (JO1 ver.)				3:31
14.	"Monstar"	Skinner Box; Stainboys; Ellie Love	Teito (KCKT); Skinner Box; Luke (13)	Teito	3:24
Total length:					48:40

Track listing of The Star – Normal edition
No.	Title	Lyrics	Music	Arrangement	Length
1.	"Starlight"				1:15
2.	"Shine a Light"				3:16
3.	"Safety Zone"				3:26
4.	"Infinity" (無限大, Mugendai)				3:03
5.	"La Pa Pa Pam"				3:08
6.	"Running"				3:50
7.	"Oh-Eh-Oh"				3:04
8.	"So What"				3:07
9.	"Go"				3:19
10.	"Voice" (君の声, Kimi no Koe, 'Your Voice')				3:35
11.	"Tsukame (It's Coming)" (ツカメ ～It's Coming～; JO1 ver.)				3:57
12.	"Young" (JO1 ver.)				3:24
13.	"Grandmaster" (JO1 ver.)				3:28
14.	"Kungchikita"				3:31
15.	"Yancha Boy Yancha Girl" (やんちゃ BOY やんちゃ GIRL, 'Naughty Boy Naughty Girl'; JO1 ver.)	KZ; Kanata Nakamura	KZ; Nthonius; Puyo	Nthonius	3:24
16.	"Happy Merry Christmas" (JO1 ver.)	Yu-ki Kokubo	Yu-ki Kokubo; Bae Jae-seok (Solcire)	Bae Jae-seok	3:44
17.	"Monstar"				3:24
18.	"Be with You" (足跡, Ashiato, 'Footprints')				3:39
19.	"My Friends"				3:19
Total length:					1:02:53

== Credits and personnel ==
Credits are adapted from the album's liner notes. Track listing is based on The Star normal edition.

=== Musicians ===
- JO1 – vocals (all tracks)
- Yoske – chorus (track 1)
- Lee Min-young (Eastwest) – bass (1,2,6), drum (1,2), computer programming (1,2,6,10), guitar (6,10), piano (10)
- Yeul (1by1) – piano (1,2), computer programming (1,2)
- Mook – chorus (2,6,10,17)
- Score (13) – piano (3), drum (3, 9)
- Esbee – chorus (3,18), piano (18), drum (18)
- Megatone (13) – guitar (3), bass (3,9,18)
- Yhanael – Japanese translation (3)
- KZ – MIDI programming (4), synthesizer (4), drum (4,15,19), bass (4,15,19), chorus (4,15,19), electric piano (15,19), guitar (19)
- B.O – chorus (4,15,19)
- Nthonious – MIDI programming (4,15,19), synthesizer (4,15,19), drum (4,15,19), bass (4), guitar (19)
- Kim Seung-soo – MIDI programming (4), synthesizer (4), drum (4), bass (4)
- Kim Hye-kwang – chorus (4), vocal editing (15,19)
- Who's H – vocal editing (4)
- Young Jay (KCKT) – bass (5), chorus (5,814), drum (8,14)
- Buggy (KCKT) – drum (5), chorus (5,8,14), keyboard (14), bass (14), synthesizer (8)
- Ven (KCKT) – synthesizer (5), chorus (5,8,14), guitar (14), bass (8)
- Teito (KCKT) – chorus (5,8), vocal tuning (5), synthesizer (14,17), keyboard (8), bass (17), drum (17)
- Kohway (KCKT) – chorus (5,8,14)
- Minit – acoustic piano (7), synthesizer (7), electric guitar (7), bass (7), drum (7), string (7), sound effect (7)
- Airair – acoustic piano (7), synthesizer (7), electric guitar (7), bass (7), drum (7), string (7), sound effect (7)
- Lazier – chorus (7)
- Onestar (Monotree) – chorus (9)
- Ryan S. Jhun – producing (11), vocal directing (11)
- Andrew Choi – vocal directing (11), background vocals (11)
- Eunsol (1008) – producing (11), keyboard (11), bass (11), drum (11)
- Seo Yi-sung – producing (11), drum (11)
- Sun – tune (12)
- Dono – chorus (12)
- Coach – guitar (13), chorus (13)
- Sendo – bass (13)
- Yuki – chorus (13)
- Ji Seung-gyu – chorus (13)
- Bae Jae-seok (Solcire) – chorus (16), digital editing & tuning (16)
- Jkun – guitar (17)
- Ouow – producing (18)
- Nile Lee – string arranging (18)
- Yundak – piano (18), drum (18)
- Last P – piano (18), drum (18)
- Lee Tae-wook – guitar (18)
- Yinail – string arrangement (18)
- On The String – string (18)

=== Technicals ===
- Osamu Shiota – recording (1–3,7–10,16–19)
- Kim Min–hee – recording (4,5,6)
- Jang Woo-young – recording (11,12)
- Min Sung-su – recording (13)
- Eugene Kwon – recording (14)
- Kwon Yoo-jin – recording (15)
- Gu Jong-pil – mixing (1–3,9,10,15–18)
- Master Key – mixing (4,7,8)
- Teito (KCKT) – mixing (5), asst. mixing (14)
- Hong Sung-joon – mixing (6)
- Jennifer Hong – asst. mixing (6)
- Jeung Eun-kyung – mixing (11)
- Park Seong-min – mixing (12)
- Coach & Sendo – mixing (13)
- Ko Hyun-jeong – mixing (14)
- Lee Gun-ho – mixing (19)
- Kwon Nam-woo – mastering (all tracks)
- Jang Seung-ho – asst. mastering (9)

=== Locations ===
Recording

- Sound Valley
- Doobdooob Studio
- 821 Sound
- Studio A-tone
- Studio Fine

Mixing

- Klang Studio
- Ingrid Studio
- Mesunshine
- Studio C
- Koko Sound Studio
- Team N Genius
- Gaenari Sound
- 821 Sound

Mastering

- 821 Sound

Vocal editing

- Kwang Sound

=== Visual ===
- Cho Dae-yong (Rainbowbus) – album design
- Shin Hyo jin (Rainbowbus) – album design
- Shim Jee-hee (Rainbowbus) – album design
- Min In-hong – style director
- Takashi Kamei – photographer
- VITA – retouch
- LiNK-UP – retouch
- Shohei Fujinaga – stylist
- Cheeks – hair & make–up
- Tamzin (Choi Young-joon) – choreography (2–4,6,7)
- Sorr (AP) – choreography (5,8)
- You Seung-hyun – choreography (17)

== Charts ==
=== Weekly charts ===
Weekly chart performance for The Star
Chart (2020)	Peak position
Japanese Albums (Oricon)	2
Japanese Combined Albums (Oricon)	2
Japanese Hot Albums (Billboard Japan)	2

=== Year-end charts ===
2020 year-end chart performance for The Star
Chart (2020)	Position
Japanese Albums (Oricon)	21
Japanese Combined Albums (Oricon)	23

2021 year-end chart performance for The Star
Chart (2021)	Position
Japanese Hot Albums (Billboard Japan)	22

== Certifications ==
Certifications and sales for The Star
Region	Certification	Certified units/sales
Japan (RIAJ)	Gold	100,000^{^}
^{^} Shipments figures based on certification alone.

== Release history ==
Release dates and formats for The Star
Region	Date	Label	Format	Edition	Catalog
Japan	November 25, 2020	Lapone Entertainment	CD; DVD	Limited red	YRCS-95102
Japan	November 25, 2020	Lapone Entertainment	CD; photo book	Limited green	YRCS-95103
Japan	November 25, 2020	Lapone Entertainment	CD; accordion card	Limited blue	YRCS-95104
Japan	November 25, 2020	Lapone Entertainment	CD; solo poster	Normal	YRCS-95105
Various	November 25, 2020	Lapone Entertainment	Download; streaming	Normal	—N/a
