= JO1 the Movie: Unfinished - Go to the Top =

- Theatrical release poster

Japanese name
- Kanji: JO1 THE MOVIE『未完成』-GO to the TOP-
Transcriptions
- Revised Hepburn: JO1 the Movie: Mikansei - Go to the Top
- Directed by: Tetsuro Inagaki
- Produced by: Yusuke Kitahashi; Masaya Shibuwasa; Hiroshi Tamura
- Starring: JO1
- Cinematography: Yuki Nakamura; Shunya Narikawa
- Edited by: Tetsurō Inagaki
- Production companies: Toho; Lapone Entertainment; Yoshimoto Kogyo
- Distributed by: Toho Imaging Division; Yoshimoto Kogyo
- Release date: 11 March 2022
- Running time: 108 minutes
- Country: Japan
- Language: Japanese

JO1 the Movie: Unfinished - Go to the Top (Japanese: JO1 THE MOVIE『未完成』-GO to the TOP-, Hepburn: JO1 the Movie: Mikansei - Go to the Top) is a 2022 Japanese documentary film directed by Tetsurō Inagaki, featuring Japanese boy band JO1. It was released on March 11, 2022, and documented the first two years of the group's career. The film list eighth on the national box office ranking in its opening weekend.

== Synopsis ==
The documentary covers the first two years of JO1, an 11-member Japanese boy band formed from the audition television program Produce 101 Japan. The group was promised a spectacular career, but they were not confident they could make it. Selected based on votes by viewers, each member of JO1 has different experience in performing, including members who had never taken any vocal or dance lessons before. Moreover, the COVID-19 pandemic hit the world not long after the release of their debut single, Protostar, on March 4, 2020, and forced them to restrict their activities. Despite these difficulties, JO1 grew through daily vocal and dance lessons, promotional activities, and program recording. The film closely follows the group from the early stages of their debut to their long-awaited first live concert with an audience, titled 2021 JO1 Live "Open the Door", in November 2021.

== Cast ==
- Ohira Shosei
- Ren Kawashiri
- Kawanishi Takumi
- Syoya Kimata
- Sukai Kinjo
- Junki Kono
- Keigo Sato
- Ruki Shiroiwa
- Shion Tsurubo
- Issei Mamehara
- Sho Yonashiro

== Background and production ==
The documentary was announced on during the second anniversary of JO1's formation on December 12, 2021. It was directed by Tetsurō Inagaki who had previously worked on a documentary film for Mr. Children. The main title Unfinished was chosen by the members to indicate their "unfinished" selves. Tetsurō revealed that he had been following the group with his camera for almost a year by the time the film was announced, amassing a total of 50 terabytes of footage.

== Release and promotion ==
Initial theatrical poster of JO1 the Movie: Unfinished - Go to the Top

On December 20, 2021, a 30-second teaser video and the official poster of the film were released. The poster image was taken from the 2021 JO1 Live "Open the Door" and only features 10 members of JO1, due to Sukai Kinjo whose activities had been suspended after diagnosed with adjustment disorder in October that year. On February 11, 2022, the official trailer for the film was released, featuring the theme song "Toberu Kara" (飛べるから, I Can Fly). The film was premiered in 101 theaters nationwide on March 11, 2022, with a new theatrical poster featuring all 11 members of JO1. To promote the film, a stage greeting was held at Toho Cinemas Shinjuku, Tokyo on March 12, 2022, with JO1 and director Tetsurō Inagaki in attendance. The event was live-screened at 101 theaters and watched by around 40,000 fans nationwide.

To celebrate the third anniversary of JO1 on December 11, 2022, JO1 the Movie: Unfinished - Go to the Top was re-screened at 99 movie theaters in Japan. The movie was also screened under the English title JO1 the Movie - Go to the Top with multilingual subtitles in four countries: the United States, France, Indonesia, and Thailand. After the screening, JO1 members appeared at Toho Cinemas Roppongi to greet the audience, live-screened to all theaters mentioned previously except the United States and France.

The film will be released on Amazon Prime Video starting October 20, 2023.

=== Music ===
Theme song "Toberu Kara" was released on March 4, 2022, with its music video featuring scenes from the film was released the next day. The song peaked at number 42 on the Billboard Japan Hot 100.

=== Home release ===
JO1 the Movie: Unfinished - Go to the Top was released for digital download on Amazon Prime Video, iTunes, Google Play, YouTube and Hikari TV on November 12, 2022. A Blu-ray and DVD physical release was scheduled for January 12, 2023, with 12-minute bonus content and English subtitle for the group's official fan club members only.

== Reception ==
=== Box office ===
The documentary entered the box office at number eight on its opening weekend. It eventually ranked ninth on the weekly ranking.

=== Critical response ===
Entertainment writer Akiko Shin of QJWeb stated that JO1 the Movie: Unfinished - Go to the Top was easy to understand for those who were not existing fans of JO1, and wrote "The film could have been portrayed as a tearful coming-of-age story of dreaming youths. However, the director, Tetsurō Inagaki, has created a positive story with no lies, and we can feel his love for this film." She further stated that "The film looks back on JO1's history without omission, showing changes in their performance and facial expressions, and also reveling the high quality of their musicality. The sound, realism, and intensity of this film are also part of its charm." In addition, the movie ranked second on the review aggregator Filmarks' Mid-Year Satisfaction Ranking for movies distributed in Japan with reviews ranging from 500 to 9,999.
