= Junki Kono =

Japanese singer and actor (born 1998)

- 河野 純喜
- Kono in 2026
- Born: January 20, 1998 (age 28); Nara, Japan
- Education: Doshisha University
- Occupations: Singer; actor
- Years active: 2019–present
- Musical career
- Genres: J-pop; K-pop
- Instrument: Vocals
- Label: Lapone
- Member of: JO1
- Website: Official website

Japanese name
- Kanji: 河野 純喜
- Hiragana: こうの じゅんき
- Romanization: Kōno Junki

Korean name
- Hangul: 코노 준키
- Revised Romanization: Kono Junki
- McCune–Reischauer: K'ono Chunk'i

Junki Kono (河野 純喜, Kōno Junki; born January 20, 1998) is a Japanese singer and actor. He debuted as a member and vocal leader of the Japanese boy band JO1 in 2020, after placing ninth in the first season of Produce 101 Japan. He was featured in SawanoHiroyuki[nZk]'s single "Outsiders" in 2022 and the Japanese voice dub for Jonathan in Snow White (2025).

== Early life and education ==
Junki Kono was born on January 20, 1998, in Nara, Japan. As a child, he played football for his local Heguri Football Club. In 2018, he joined Horyuji Football Club as a midfielder. That same year, their team won the Kansai qualifying round of the 25th National Club Team Football Championships on September 9.

Kono graduated from the Faculty of Policy Studies at Doshisha University. While attending university, he worked part-time as a security staff member at a concert venue, an experience that reinforced his desire to pursue a career as a singer.

Alongside his native Japanese, Kono is learning Korean.

== Career ==
=== 2019–2021: Produce 101 Japan and debut with JO1 ===
After graduation, Kono was job hunting and had received an offer, which he turned down to participate in Produce 101 Japan, a reality competition show that's a spin-off of the South Korean Produce 101 franchise. In September 2019, Kono auditioned for the show as part of the audition group Six Packs. The show ended in December, where he finished in ninth place with 159,057 votes.

After undergoing training in Korea, Kono debuted in the resulting group JO1 on March 4, 2020, through the release of their first single Protostar under Lapone Entertainment. In December, he appeared on The First Take, performing an acoustic version of "Infinity" and "Voice" from Protostar and the group's first studio album, The Star. Both performances were released as digital singles on January 13, 2021.

=== 2022–present: Solo activities and acting debut ===
In April 2022, he had a regular role as a student on NHK-E's Hangul! Navi, a Korean learning show. In May, Kono co-wrote the song "Touch!" for JO1's second studio album Kizuna, and was featured alongside bandmate Sho Yonashiro on SawanoHiroyuki[nZk]'s single "Outsiders", the ending theme song of the anime Fanfare of Adolescence.

In 2023, Kono co-wrote the song "NEWSmile" for JO1's third studio album Equinox. It was used as the theme song of the morning news show Mezamashi 8. On August 22, it was announced that Kono and bandmate Keigo Sato were cast as MCs of the two-episode television program Case Study - Forbidden Love Experiment, a part of Fuji TV's program slot Tuesday NEXT!.

In 2024, Kono was appointed as a cast member of TBS Television's show Love It!, where he appeared every Thursday from April to June. From June to September, Kono played Iida Tomohiro in the drama My Girlfriend's Child, which was broadcast on Kansai TV and Fuji TV. The drama is based on the eponymous manga series by Mamoru Aoi, where Tomohiro is one of the main character's classmates.

In 2025, Kono did the Japanese dub for the role of Jonathan in the film Snow White. and co-wrote the JO1 digital single "Be Brave!" for the live action adaptation of Bad Boys. In the following year, Kono was named Mezamashi TV's monthly entertainment presenter for the month of June 2026. He later hosted Abema's original documentary program Celeb Secret alongside Rino Sashihara. Kono co-wrote the lead track of JO1's upcoming eleventh single, "Ignite", which will serve as the opening theme song for the fourth season of Tokyo Revengers.

== Endorsements ==
In March 2026, Sekido's skin care brand Hada to Kokoro appointed Kono as a brand ambassador.

== Discography ==
=== Singles ===
==== As lead artist ====
List of singles as a lead artist, with selected chart positions, showing year released and album name
Title	Year	Peak chart position		Sales	Album
Title	Year	JPN Dig.	JPN DL	Sales	Album
"Infinity" (無限大) (from The First Take) (Note: "Infinity" and "Voice" are both songs by JO1, which were performed by Kono alone on The First Take.)	2021	—	73	—N/a	Non-album singles
"Voice" (君の声) (from The First Take)	2021	—	79	—N/a	Non-album singles
"Singing in the Rain"	2025	40	44	JPN: 846	Non-album singles
"—" denotes releases that did not chart or were not released in that region.

==== As a featured artist ====
List of singles as a featured artist, with selected chart positions, showing year released and album name
Title	Year	Peak chart position	Sales	Album
Title	Year	JPN	Sales	Album
"Outsiders" (SawanoHiroyuki[nZk] feat. Junki Kono and Sho Yonashiro of JO1)	2022	25	JPN: 2,709	V

=== Guest appearances ===
List of non-single guest appearances, showing year released, other performing artists, and album name
Title	Year	Other artist(s)	Album
"Princess Problems"	2025	Sakura Kiryu	Disney's Snow White (Japanese Original Motion Picture Soundtrack)
"A Hand Meets a Hand"	2025	Sakura Kiryu	Disney's Snow White (Japanese Original Motion Picture Soundtrack)
"Life Still Goes On"	2026	Rihito Ikezaki	Deep Blue Hours

=== Songwriting credits ===
All song credits are adapted from the Japanese Society for Rights of Authors, Composers and Publishers's database, unless otherwise noted.

Key
†	Indicates single
#	Indicates a non-commercial release

List of songs, showing year released, artist name, and name of the album
Title	Year	Artist(s)	Album	Lyrics		Music		Ref.
Title	Year	Artist(s)	Album	Credit	With	Credit	With	Ref.
"Touch!"	2022	JO1	Kizuna	Yes	Jinli (Fullbloom)	No		
"NEWSmile" †	2023	JO1	Equinox	Yes	Syoya, Sukai, Sho, Shosei	No		
"Love All Star" †	2024	JO1, INI, DXTeen	Non-album single	Yes	Sukai, Hiromu, Koshin, Ken	No		
"Lemon Candy"	2024	JO1	Hitchhiker	Yes	Yuki Kokubo, Yhel, Jung Yong-hwa	No		
"Singing in the Rain" #	2025	Junki	PlanJ track (Note: PlanJ is a series of self-projects by JO1 members on YouTube.)	Yes	—N/a	No		
"Bon Voyage"	2025	JO1	Be Classic	Yes (Note: As JO1)	Masami Kakimuma	Yes	Ren, Syoya	
"Be Brave!" †	2025	JO1	Non-album single	Yes	Sukai	No		
"Slow"	2026	Junki, Sukai	Unreleased song (Note: Performed during the 2026 Eien Dome Tour)	Yes	Kotomi Fukagawa, Masami Kakinuma	No		
"Ignite" †	2026	JO1	AAO	Yes	Syoya, Kohei Abe, N1ko	No		

== Filmography ==
=== Television series ===
List of television programs, with release year, role and note
Year	Title	Role	Note	Ref.
2022	Short Program	Wataru Matsumura	Lead role; anthology series	
2024	My Girlfriend's Child	Iida Tomohiro		

=== Television shows ===
Year	Title	Role	Note	Ref.
2019	Produce 101 Japan	Contestant	Finished 9th	
2020	Colorful: Warau no Chikara de 77 Oku Saisei	Assistant		
2022–2023	Hangul! Navi	Student	Cast member	
2023	Case Study - Forbidden Love Experiment	Host	Part of Tuesday NEXT!	
2024	Love It!	Himself	Cast member	
2024	The Comedy Dual	Narrator		
2025	The Comedy Dual 2025	Narrator		
2026	Mezamashi TV	Host of the month	For June 2026	
2026	Celeb Secret	Host	Documentary program	

=== Japanese dub ===
Year	Title	Role	Voice double	Ref.
2025	Snow White	Jonathan	Andrew Burnap	

=== Music videos ===
==== As lead artist ====
List of music videos, showing year released and directors
Title	Year	Director	Ref.
"Singing in the Rain"	2025	Karin Takeda	

==== As featured artist ====
List of music videos, showing year released, other artists and directors
Title	Year	Other artist(s)	Director	Ref.
"Outsiders"	2022	SawanoHiroyuki[nZk], Sho Yonashiro	Takuya Oyama	

=== Hosting ===
Year	Title	Notes	Ref.
2023	KCON 2022 Japan	With New Jeans' Minji and NU'EST's Hwang Min-hyun	
