= Stargazer (EP) =

- Normal and digital special edition cover

Single by JO1

from the album The Star
- Language: Japanese
- A-side: "Oh-Eh-Oh"
- Released: August 26, 2020
- Recorded: 2020
- Genre: J-pop; house; hip-hop; EDM; trap
- Length: 13:00 (Limited edition A); 13:14 (Limited edition B); 13:06 (Normal edition); 19:46 (Special edition)
- Label: Lapone Entertainment
- Producers: Minit; Hui; KCKT; EastWest; Score (13); Megatone (13); Nthonious

JO1 singles chronology
"Protostar" (2020)	"Stargazer" (2020)	"Challenger" (2021)

Alternative cover
- Limited edition B cover

Music video
- "Oh-Eh-Oh" on YouTube

Stargazer (stylized in all caps) is an extended play (EP) marketed as the second single of Japanese boy band JO1, formed through the reality competition show Produce 101 Japan. It also served as the second single for their first studio album The Star (2020). The EP single includes six songs primarily from the house, hip-hop, EDM, and trap genres and was released by Lapone Entertainment in three different physical editions and one digital edition on August 26, 2020, with "Oh-Eh-Oh" serving as the lead track.

The single features first contribution by members Sho Yonashiro and Ren Kawashiri on lyrics and choreography, respectively, as well as production by Hui from South Korean boy group Pentagon among others. It ranked first on the Oricon Singles Chart and was certified Platinum by the Recording Industry Association of Japan, while "Oh-Eh-Oh" peaked at number one on the Billboard Japan Hot 100.

== Background and release ==
Following their debut single Protostar and performance at KCON:TACT, JO1 announced the release of their second single, Stargazer, on August 26, 2020. The cover images were released on July 7, with the members dressed in school uniforms, encapsulating the single's concept: "A message from JO1 of the same generation as teenagers in distress. The teenagers who grow up amid fears and hesitations and eventually meet their 'shining self' one day." Meanwhile, the cover image of the limited edition B shows the members as adults, dressed in Louis Vuitton's 2020 pre-fall collection, Arc of Boyhood.

Stargazer consists of six songs and were released in three physical editions, with "Oh-Eh-Oh" serving as the lead track. The first edition is a limited CD and DVD bundle that contains a making-of video for "Oh-Eh-Oh", a variety segment with members titled JO1 School and the group's version of the song "Kungchikita" that was performed on Produce 101 Japan. The second edition is a limited CD and photo booklet bundle. The third edition is a regular CD-only edition. Besides "Oh-Eh-Oh", the song "My Friends", written by leader Yonashiro, is included in all editions. Meanwhile, a special edition with all the songs was made available for digital download and streaming.

To support the single, performance videos for "Go" and "So What" were also released. On the release day, JO1 held special live streaming events consecutively on the group's YouTube and TikTok accounts.

== Conception and recording ==
In an interview, members Yonashiro and Ruki Shiroiwa told Tokyo FM radio program Tokyo Speakeasy that they had to take lessons and record the single remotely due to the COVID-19 pandemic. They received half to one hour daily vocal and rap lessons from their trainers in South Korea by singing into their smartphones. They also learned the choreography by watching videos their trainers had sent them. During the recording, the Korean production team guided them over the phone with the help of an interpreter.

Yonashiro revealed that he had decided to write the lyrics for "My Friends" and consulted with their production team during the recording of Protostar in South Korea. He explained, "I wrote it with gratitude to the people I met at the audition (Produce 101 Japan), my members, and fans." Fellow member Kawashiri choreographed the song.

== Lead track ==
The lead track, "Oh-Eh-Oh", combines EDM, house music, and vocals, to portray the determination to push into the future, creating an overpowering sense of exhilaration. The song was first performed on the Fuji TV prime-time music program Hey!Hey!Neo! Music Champ on August 1, and the mention of Hui from the South Korean boy group Pentagon in the song credits drew the public's attention. His agency, Cube Entertainment, later confirmed his participation in the song's production.

The music video was directed by the Space Shower Music Awards Best Director Award winner Hidenobu Tanabe and was released on August 26, 2020. It features a fight scene between the members, who played high school students, and a mysterious group, in which Kawashiri playing two roles.

"Oh-Eh-Oh" reached number one on Billboard Japan Hot 100 and thirty-three on the Top Download Songs chart. It eventually ranked eighty-second on the Hot 100 Year-End chart. The song was used as the ending song for ABC TV's shows Sonna Koto Kangaetakoto Nakatta Quiz! Torinikku-tte Nanno Niku!? and Yasutomo no Itatte Shinken Desu as well as Kansai TV's Chacha Ire Monday in September. It was also used as the theme song for ABC-Mart x Nike's digital campaign for Nike Court Vision.

== Promotion ==
To promote the single, JO1 appeared on several music television programs, including Music On! TV, MTV Japan, and Space Shower TV. On September 5, JO1 headlined Japan's biggest fashion event, the 31st Mynavi Tokyo Girls Collection Autumn/Winter 2020, in Saitama Super Arena, performing the songs "Go", "So What", and "Oh-Eh-Oh". Their performance was live streamed via Line Live, during which the viewership peaked at around 270,000. On October 17, JO1 participated in the Korean wave convention KCON:TACT from Japan for the second time. They performed "Oh-Eh-Oh", "Go" and "So What" from the single as well as debuted "My Friends".

== Commercial performance ==
Stargazer debuted at number one on the Oricon Daily Singles Chart and eventually topped the weekly chart with 283,363 copies sold. This made JO1 the only artist to have two consecutive wins on the chart after a debut single, following Hinatazaka46's "Do Re Mi Sol La Si Do" on July 29, 2019. The single was certified Platinum by the Recording Industry Association of Japan for shipments of more than 250,000 units and eventually ranked seventeenth on the 2020 Oricon Annual Ranking, with 312,404 physical copies sold. Stargazer also debuted first on the Billboard Japan Top Singles Sales chart and finished sixteenth on the year-end edition.

== Track listing ==
"Oh-Eh-Oh" and "My Friends" are common track 1 and 4, respectively, for limited edition A, limited edition B and normal edition.

Track listing of Stargazer – Limited edition A
No.	Title	Lyrics	Music	Arrangement	Length
1.	"Oh-Eh-Oh"	Ellie Love; Hui	Minit; Hui; Airair	Minit; Hui	3:04
2.	"So What"	Young Jay (KCKT); Teito (KCKT); Ven (KCKT); Buggy (KCKT); Rosieblue	Young Jay; Teito; Ven; Buggy	Young Jay; Teito; Ven; Buggy	3:07
3.	"Kungchikita" (JO1 ver.)	Young Jay; Buggy; Ven; Kohway (KCKT); Kanata Nakamura	Young Jay; Buggy; Ven; Kohway	Young Jay; Buggy; Ven; Kohway	3:30
4.	"My Friends"	Sho Yonashiro; KZ; Nthonius	KZ; Nthonius	Nthonious	3:19
Total length:					13:00

Track listing of Stargazer – Limited edition B
No.	Title	Lyrics	Music	Arrangement	Length
2.	"Voice" (君の声, Kimi no Koe, 'Your Voice')	Yoske; Alive Knob	EastWest; Yoske	EastWest	3:34
3.	"Go"	Score (13); Megatone (13); Onestar (Monotree); J.Rise; Yhanael	Score; Megatone; Onestar	Score; Megatone	3:17
Total length:					13:14

Track listing of Stargazer – Normal edition
No.	Title	Length
2.	"So What"	3:07
3.	"Voice"	3:35
Total length:		13:06

Track listing of Stargazer – Special edition (digital)
No.	Title	Length
1.	"Oh-Eh-Oh"	3:02
2.	"So What"	3:05
3.	"Kungchikita" (JO1 ver.)	3:29
4.	"Voice" (君の声, Kimi no Koe, 'Your Voice')	3:34
5.	"Go"	3:17
6.	"My Friends"	:19
Total length:		19:46

Track listing of Stargazer – Limited edition A (DVD)
No.	Title	Length
1.	"Making video + JO1 School"	01:15:03
Total length:		01:15:03

== Charts ==
=== Weekly charts ===
Weekly chart performance for Stargazer
Chart (2020)	Peak position
Japan (Oricon)	1
Japan Combined Singles (Oricon)	1
Japan Top Singles Sales (Billboard Japan)	1

=== Monthly charts ===
Monthly chart performance for Stargazer
Chart (2020)	Peak position
Japan (Oricon)	3

=== Year-end charts ===
2020 year-end chart performance for Stargazer
Chart (2020)	Position
Japan (Oricon)	17
Japan Combined Singles (Oricon)	34
Japan Top Singles Sales (Billboard Japan)	16

== Certifications ==
Certifications and sales for Stargazer
Region	Certification	Certified units/sales
Japan (RIAJ)	Platinum	250,000^{^}
^{^} Shipments figures based on certification alone.

== Release history ==
Release dates and formats for Stargazer
Region	Date	Label	Format	Type	Catalog
Japan	August 6, 2020	Lapone Entertainment	CD; DVD	Limited A	YRCS-90181
Japan	August 6, 2020	Lapone Entertainment	CD; photo booklet	Limited B	YRCS-90182
Japan	August 6, 2020	Lapone Entertainment	CD	Normal	YRCS-90183
Various	August 6, 2020	Lapone Entertainment	Download; streaming	Special	—N/a
