= OWV =

Japanese idol boy band

- Origin: Japan
- Genre: J-pop
- Years active: 2020–present
- Label: Yoshimoto Kogyo
- Members: Kosuke Honda; Katsunari Nakagawa; Shuta Urano; Fumiya Sano
- Website: owv.jp

OWV (オウブ) is a Japanese boy band consisting of four former Produce 101 Japan contestants. They debuted with the single, "Uba Uba" in September 2020.

== History ==
OWV was formed on May 25, 2020. They released their debut single, "Uba Uba", on September 30. Their second single, "Ready Set Go", was released on January 20, 2021, followed by their third single, "Roar", on March 31, and their fourth single, "Get Away", on July 28. They released their debut album, Chaser, on October 13. Their fifth single, "You", was released on March 9, 2022, followed by their sixth single, "Time Jackerz", on July 27, and their seventh single, "Let Go", on November 2. They released their second album, Jack Pot, on July 19, 2023. Their eighth single, "Bremen" was released on February 7, 2024, followed by their ninth single, "Love Banditz", on June 12. They are set to release their tenth single, "Frontier", on October 23.

== Members ==
- Kosuke Honda (本田康祐)
- Katsunari Nakagawa (中川勝就)
- Shuta Urano (浦野秀太)
- Fumiya Sano (佐野文哉)

== Discography ==
=== Studio albums ===
Title	Album details	Peak chart positions	
Title	Album details	Oricon	Billboard
Chaser	Released: October 13, 2021; Label: Universal Music Japan; Formats: CD, digital download	5	4
Jack Pot	Released: July 19, 2023; Label: Universal Music Japan; Formats: CD, digital download	9	3
Supernova	Released: April 9, 2025; Label: Universal Music Japan; Formats: CD, digital download	2	27

=== Singles ===
Title	Year	Peak chart positions	Album
Title	Year	Oricon	Album
"Uba Uba"	2020	5	Chaser
"Ready Set Go"	2021	3	Chaser
"Roar"	2021	3	Chaser
"Get Away"	2021	5	Chaser
"Chaser"	2021	4	Chaser
"You"	2022	4	Jack Pot
"Time Jackerz"	2022	3	Jack Pot
"Let Go"	2022	4	Jack Pot
"Gamer"	2023	4	Jack Pot
"Bremen"	2024	1	Supernova
"Love Banditz"	2024	4	Supernova
"Sleepless Town"	2024	—	Supernova
"Frontier"	2024	5	Supernova
"Supernova"	2025	—	Supernova
"Black Crown"	2025	1	Non-album single
"Rocket Mode"	2026	2	Non-album single
"Lovey-Dovey"	2026	5	Non-album single
"—" denotes releases that did not chart.
