= Tropical Night (EP) =

2023 single by JO1

- Normal and digital special edition cover

Single by JO1

from the album Equinox
- Language: Japanese
- A-side: "Tiger"
- Released: April 5, 2023
- Recorded: 2023
- Genre: J-pop
- Length: 12:47 (limited edition A); 13:41 (limited edition B); 19:28 (normal edition); 22:52 (special edition)
- Label: Lapone Entertainment
- Producers: Asher Postman; Jung Ho-hyun (e.one); 1by1; SUA; RHeat; Daily; Nmore; Pop Time; Bicksancho; Mospick

JO1 singles chronology
"Midnight Sun" (2022)	"Tropical Night" (2023)	"Hitchhiker" (2024)

Music video
- "Tiger" on YouTube

Tropical Night (stylized in all caps) is an extended play (EP) marketed as the seventh single of Japanese boy band JO1. It also served as the second single for their third studio album, Equinox (2023). The EP single includes six songs and two instrumental tracks and was released by Lapone Entertainment in four editions on April 5, 2023. It features frequent collaborators such as Jung Ho-hyun, 1by1, Nmore, and Poptime, and the group's first collaboration with EDM artist Asher Postman. The EP single also includes the Japan Record Excellent Work Award winner "Trigger", as well as "We Good" and "Romance", theme songs for television series Our Little Love Story, starring Syoya Kimata, and Blue Birthday, starring Shion Tsurubo.

JO1 promoted the EP single by performing the lead track "Tiger" at the Hanshin Tigers vs. Hiroshima Toyo Carp match in Hanshin Koshien Stadium and attending international music events, such as KCON in Thailand and Dream Concert in South Korea. The single Tropical Night became JO1's seventh consecutive number-one single on the Oricon chart, while "Tiger" topped the Billboard Japan Hot 100 and marked the group's debut on the US Billboard Hot Trending Songs chart.

== Background and release ==
Twelve days after making their debut performance on the NHK's annual New Year's eve musical show Kōhaku Uta Gassen, JO1 announced that they would release a new digital song "We Good" as the theme song of the television series Our Little Love Story, starring member Syoya Kimata, on January 19, 2023. On February 8, JO1 released the medium ballad song "Romance", which served as the theme song of the Japanese version of Blue Birthday, starring member Shion Tsurubo and Airi Matsui, accompanied by the release of the recording video of the song on JO1's official YouTube channel. On February 15, JO1 announced that their next EP single, Tropical Night, was slated to be released on April 5, 2023. The theme of the EP single is "the passion of pursuing a goal; the beauty of the youths who are passionately chasing after something". Its title was taken from the eponymous weather event and meant to capture an image of "dull night", which "comes as the aftermath of putting all of yourself into a work and feeling the pain and loss that hits when that work is done".

The EP single consists of a total of six songs and two instrumental versions, with "Tiger" as the lead track. The two limited editions each features four tracks and comes with a DVD bundle consisting a variety segment. The limited edition A features "We Good" and video JO1's Passion (Enthusiasm), while the limited edition B features "Romance" and video JO1's Passion (Memories). The CD-only normal edition comes with four unreleased songs and two instrumental versions. A special digital version consisting all six songs and an instrumental version of "Tiger" was also made available on the release day.

== Lead track ==
The lead track "Tiger" was digitally released March 19, 2023. Co-produced by EDM artist Asher Postman, it debuted at number 45 on Billboard Japan Hot 100 and number 25 on Oricon Combined Single Chart, and eventually topped both charts during its release week. "Tiger" also became the first JO1's song that charted on Billboard's Hot Trending Songs chart, at number 13. The song was performed for the first time later on the same day at KCON 2023 Thailand, along with the Korean version of "Phobia" from their previous EP single. It was debuted in Japan the next day on CDTV Live! Live!, followed by performances in various music shows, including Music Fair, Venue101, Utacon, and South Korean M Countdown. On March 24, the music video was released, with Jeon Ji-hoon served as the director.

== Promotion ==
To commemorate the release of Tropical Night, JO1 held the Tiger Jack campaign, in which the group would meet various "tigers". The campaign started on March 31, 2023, with JOChum, characters produced by JO1 members in collaboration with Sanrio, transformed into tigers. During the release day live streaming, the group was joined by a mascot of Shimajirō, the character from the children's anime series Shima Shima Tora no Shimajirō. On April 19, JO1 performed "Tiger" to open the Hanshin Tigers vs. Hiroshima Toyo Carp match, held at Hanshin Koshien Stadium in Hyōgo, with members Issei Mamehara and Takumi Kawanishi acted as the first pitcher and batter.

To further promote Tropical Night, JO1 performed songs from the EP single at domestic and international events, such as KCON 2023 Thailand, Mezamashi TV 30th Anniversary Festival, KCON 2023 Japan, 29th Dream Concert, Lapone Entertainment's first joint concert, Laposta 2023, and 2023 Dream Concert in Japan. They also performed "Trigger" on television music specials, Venue101 Presents JO1 Request Live and Kamioto - Kamigata Song Festival.

== Commercial performance ==
Tropical Night debuted at number one on Oricon Daily Singles Chart with 228,203 copies sold. The EP single became the group's seventh consecutive number-one on the weekly chart with 304,864 copies sold, making it their fourth single that passed 300,000 copies sold within the first week. Tropical Night also topped the Billboard Japan Top Singles Sales chart with 416,473 copies sold and was certified Double Platinum by the Recording Industry Association of Japan for more than 500,000 copies in shipments. It eventually ranked at number ten and twelve at Oricon and Billboard Japan's mid-year single sales chart of 2023, respectively.

== Track listing ==
"Tiger" and "Comma" are common tracks 1 and 2 for all editions.

Track listing of Tropical Night – Limited edition A
No.	Title	Lyrics	Music	Arrangement	Length
1.	"Tiger"	Ellie Love; Stainboys; Nu'maker; Asher Postman	Postman; Hautboi Rich	Postman	3:05
2.	"Comma,"	Jung Ho-hyun (e.one); Kaori Morikawa	Jung	Jung	3:05
3.	"Forever Here"	Seion; Ellie Love; Daiki Inuzuka	Lee Min-young (1by1); Seion; Coldcow (1by1)	1by1	3:35
4.	"We Good"	Moon Kim; T2; K2; Anna Kusakawa; Hasegawa; Mion Yano	Kim; RHeat; SUA	SUA; RHeat	3:02
Total length:					12:47

Track listing of Tropical Night – Limited edition B
No.	Title	Lyrics	Music	Arrangement	Length
3.	"Forever Here"				3:35
4.	"Romance"	Kako; Mine Kushita	Kako; Pop Time; One. Ki; Nmore	Daily; Nmore; Pop Time	3:56
Total length:					13:41

Track listing of Tropical Night – Normal edition
No.	Title	Lyrics	Music	Arrangement	Length
3.	"Forever Here"				3:35
4.	"Trigger"	Bicksancho (Yummytone); Mospick; Elli Love	Bicksancho; Mospick	Bicksancho; Mospick	3:04
5.	"Trigger" (instrumental)				3:04
6.	"Forever Here" (instrumental)				3:35
Total length:					19:28

Track listing of Tropical Night – Special edition
No.	Title	Length
3.	"Trigger"	3:04
4.	"We Good"	3:02
5.	"Romance"	3:56
6.	"Forever Here"	3:35
7.	"Tiger" (instrumental)	3:05
Total length:		22:52

Track listing of Tropical Night – Limited edition A (DVD)
No.	Title	Length
1.	"JO1's Passion (Enthusiasm)" (JO1の情熱 ～熱中編～, JO1 no Jounetsu (Necchuhen))

Track listing of Tropical Night – Limited edition B (DVD)
No.	Title	Length
1.	"JO1's Passion (Memories)" (JO1の情熱 ～熱中編～, JO1 no Jounetsu (Omoidehen))

== Charts ==
=== Weekly charts ===
Weekly chart performance for Tropical Night
Chart (2023)	Peak position
Japan (Oricon)	1
Japan Combined Singles (Oricon)	1
Japanese Combined Albums (Oricon)	3
Japan Top Singles Sales (Billboard Japan)	1

=== Year-end charts ===
2023 year-end chart performance for Tropical Night
Chart (2023)	Position
Japan (Oricon)	26
Japan Combined Singles (Oricon)	41
Japan Top Singles Sales (Billboard Japan)	24

== Certifications ==
Certifications and sales for Tropical Night
Region	Certification	Certified units/sales
Japan (RIAJ)	2× Platinum	500,000^{^}
^{^} Shipments figures based on certification alone.

== Release history ==
Release dates and formats for Tropical Night
Region	Date	Label	Format	Edition	Catalog
Japan	April 5, 2023	Lapone Entertainment	CD; DVD	Limited A	YRCS-90223
Japan	April 5, 2023	Lapone Entertainment	CD; DVD	Limited B	YRCS-90224
Japan	April 5, 2023	Lapone Entertainment	CD	Normal	YRCS-90225
Various	April 5, 2023	Lapone Entertainment	Download; streaming	Special	—N/a
