= Orbit (Japanese group) =

Japanese-Korean boy band

- Origin: Japan
- Genres: J-pop
- Years active: 2020–present
- Labels: Dream Passport; Future Passport; Present Label
- Members: Younghoon; Yoondong; Tomo; Shunya; Yugo
- Past members: Heecho; June
- Website: www.orbit-official.com

Orbit (Japanese: オルビット; Korean: 오르빗), commonly stylized as ORβIT, is a Japanese-South Korean boy group formed by seven members who participated in the 2019 reality competition show Produce 101 Japan. The group originally consisted of Younghoon, Yoondong, Tomo, Shunya, Yugo, Heecho and June, but the latter two left the group in 2025. The group debuted on November 11, 2020, with the release of their studio album titled 00.

== History ==
=== Pre-debut ===
Heecho (under the name Heecheon), Younghoon (under the stage name Ooon), and Yoondong are former members of South Korean boy group HALO, which on hiatus on May 8, 2019. June (under the name Jun Uehara) competed on South Korea's Mnet reality-survival program Produce X 101 and finished in 91st place.

All seven members participated in Japan's spin-off series Produce 101 Japan under their legal names. However, the three former HALO members had left the show prior to its finale, citing personal reasons. June, along with individual trainees Tomoaki Ando, Shunya Osawa, and Yugo Miyajima were eliminated in the show's finale and finished in 20th, 14th, 13th, and 12th place, respectively.

=== 2020: Debut with 00 ===
Beginning on February 1, the group and its members were announced daily through a series of individual profile videos. The group released their first track, "Lazurite", a ballad song on June 20. On August 20, the group announced their debut album, 00 (オーツー, pronounced O2) with a November 11 release date under their own music label Present Label. The lead track "Universe" was pre-released digitally on October 16 and the music video was released on November 1.

=== 2021–present: Enchant and Alter Ego ===
On January 16, it was announced that the group will release their first extended play Enchant on April 21. The album features two lead tracks: "Dionaea" and "Blind". "Blind" was pre-released digitally on Line Music on March 31 and the music video was released on April 19. The music video for "Dionaea" was released on April 17. The album debuted at number one on the Oricon Albums Chart.

On October 10, it was announced that the group will release their second extended play Alter Ego on November 23.

== Members ==
- Younghoon (ヨンフン) (영훈)
- Yoondong (ユンドン) (윤동)
- Tomo (トモ) (토모)
- Shunya (シュンヤ) (슌야)
- Yugo (ユウゴ) (유고)

=== Former members ===
- Heecho (ヒチョ) (히쵸) – leader
- June (ジュン) (준)

== Discography ==
=== Studio albums ===
Title	Details	Peak chart positions		Sales
Title	Details	JPN	JPN Hot	Sales
00	Released: November 11, 2020; Label: Present Label; Formats: CD, digital download, streaming; Track listing: 1. "Universe"; 2. "Crazy Love"; 3. "Bloom"; 4. "Mooncrystalpower"; 5. "Show Off"; 6. "Serenade"; 7. "Puddle." (みずたまり。); 8. "Beautiful Butterfly"; 9. "To You" (君へ); 10. "Ready to Burn"; 11. "Showersnow"; 12. "Double 20"; 13. "Lazurite"	3	3	JPN: 32,032 (Phy.); JPN: 1,094 (Dig.)
Roar	Released: September 17, 2025; Label: Present Label; Formats: CD, digital download, streaming; Track listing: 1. "Roar"; 2. "Too Loud"; 3. "Dadada"; 4. "Huff!"; 5. "Chocolate"; 6. "Our Gravity"; 7. "Chord" (和音); 8. "Ride On"; 9. "Panorama"; 10. "Encore"	16	—	JPN: 3,879 (Phy.)

=== Extended plays ===
Title	Details	Peak chart positions			Sales
Title	Details	JPN	JPN Hot	KOR	Sales
Enchant	Released: April 21, 2021; Label: Present Label; Formats: CD, digital download, streaming; Track listing: 1. "Bird of Paradise" (極楽鳥花 ~Bird of Paradise~); 2. "Blind"; 3. "Never Gonna Get Away"; 4. "Dionaea"; 5. "Flor Lunar"	2	5	—	JPN: 17,880 (Phy.); JPN: 467 (Dig.)
Alter Ego	Released: November 23, 2021; Label: Present Label; Formats: CD, digital download, streaming; Track listing: 1. "Eclipse"; 2. "Shady"; 3. "Forever"; 4. "With"; 5. "One" (ハナ)	5	4	—	JPN: 12,705 (Phy.)
蘭 (Run)	Released: September 17, 2024; Label: Present Label; Formats: CD, digital download, streaming; Track listing: 1. "Patience"; 2. "On Your Lip"; 3. "Upper Side"; 4. "In the Stars"; 5. "Bull's Eye"	8	6	—	JPN: 16,696 (Phy.)
Trans	Released: April 28, 2026; Label: Play Maker E&M; Formats: CD, digital download, streaming; Track listing: 1. "Wonderworld"; 2. "Dadada" (Korean version); 3. "Too Loud" (Korean version); 4. "Panorama" (Korean version); 5. "IYKYK"	42	—	9	JPN: 600; KOR: 30,810

=== Singles ===
Title	Year	Peak chart positions		Album
Title	Year	JPN	JPN Hot	Album
"Universe"	2020	—	—	00
"Dionaea"	2021	—	—	Enchant
"Blind"	2021	—	—	Enchant
"Eclipse"	2021	—	—	Alter Ego
"Fun"	2023	10	—	Non-album singles
"Bull's Eye"	2024	13	60	Non-album singles
"Patience"	2024	—	—	蘭 (Run)
"Xmas-Time"	2024	14	—	Non-album single
"Too Loud"	2025	—	—	Roar
"Line Me Now"	2026	7	—	Line Me Now
"Dadada" (Korean)	2026	—	—	Trans
"Summer Vibe"	2026	—	—	Non-album single
"Tacos"	2026	—	—	Non-album single
"—" denotes releases that did not chart or were not released in that region.

== Videography ==
=== Music videos ===
Title	Year	Director(s)	Ref.
"Universe"	2020	Park Sang Woo (Rigend Film)	
"Dionaea"	2021	Shintaro Sakai	
"Blind"	2021	Kwon Yong Soo	
"Eclipse"	2021	Park Sang Woo (Rigend Film)	
