= Enjin =

Japanese idol boy band

- Origin: Japan
- Genres: J-pop
- Years active: 2020–present
- Label: Yoshimoto Kogyo
- Members: A.rik; Ryono; Hyuga; Toy; Sol; Kyo
- Past members: Fumiya Kumazawa; Tsubasa; Taiga
- Website: enjin-official.jp

Enjin (エンジン; formerly 円神), stylized in all caps, is a Japanese boy band consisting of eight former Produce 101 Japan contestants. They debuted with the single, "Say Your Name / Enjin" in February 2021.

== History ==
Enjin was formed on June 15, 2020. They released their debut single, "Say Your Name / Enjin", on February 10, 2021. Their second single, "Peace Summer / Treasure", was released on August 4. They released their third single, "Far away", on January 19, 2022. Their debut album, O, was released on September 7. Their fourth single, "Merry Go Round", was released on March 29, 2023. They released their fifth single, "Dreamland", on September 13. Fumiya Kumazawa graduated from the group on December 31. Their second album, Inception, was released on June 12, 2024. Taiga and Tsubasa graduated on November 27.

== Members ==
=== Current ===
- A.rik
- Ryono
- Hyuga
- Toy
- Sol
- Kyo

=== Former ===
- Fumiya Kumazawa (熊澤歩哉)
- Tsubasa
- Taiga

== Discography ==
=== Studio albums ===
Title	Album details	Peak chart positions	
Title	Album details	Oricon	Billboard
O	Released: September 7, 2022; Label: Universal Music Japan; Formats: CD, digital download	5	5
Inception	Released: June 12, 2024; Label: Universal Music Japan; Formats: CD, digital download	6	7

=== Extended plays ===
Title	Album details	Peak chart positions	
Title	Album details	Oricon	Billboard
Snove	Released: December 17, 2025; Label: Universal Music Japan; Formats: CD, digital download	6	—
Braze	Released: August 25, 2026; Label: Universal Music Japan; Formats: CD, digital download	11	89

=== Singles ===
Title	Year	Peak chart positions		Album
Title	Year	Oricon	Billboard	Album
"Say Your Name"	2021	7	—	O
"Enjin"	2021	7	—	O
"Peace Summer"	2021	12	—	O
"Treasure"	2021	12	—	O
"Far away"	2022	10	—	O
"Merry Go Round"	2023	6	59	Inception
"Dreamland"	2023	7	72	Inception
"Major"	2024	—	—	Inception
"Day by Day by Day"	2025	—	—	Snove
"—" denotes releases that did not chart or were not released in that region.
