= Midnight Sun (JO1 EP) =

2022 single by JO1

- Normal and digital special edition cover

Single by JO1

from the album Equinox
- Language: Japanese
- A-side: "SuperCali"
- Released: October 15, 2022
- Recorded: 2022
- Genre: J-pop
- Length: 12:54 (limited edition A); 13:25 (limited edition B); 19:53 (normal edition); 16:15 (special edition)
- Label: Lapone Entertainment
- Producers: Nmore; Poptime; Honeysweat; Gloryface (Full8loom); Harry (Full8loom); Teito; Jung Ho-hyun

JO1 singles chronology
"Wandering" (2021)	"Midnight Sun" (2022)	"Tropical Night" (2023)

Music video
- "SuperCali" on YouTube

Midnight Sun (stylized in all caps) is an extended play (EP) marketed as the sixth single of Japanese boy band JO1. It also served as the lead single for their third studio album, Equinox (2023). The EP single includes four songs and four instrumental tracks and was released digitally by Lapone Entertainment on October 10, 2022, with the three physical editions following on October 12, 2022. It features the group's frequent collaborators such as Teito, Jung Ho-hyun, Full8loom, Nmore, and Poptime.

Midnight Sun became JO1's sixth single to top the Oricon Singles Chart and first single to sell over 600,000 copies sold in its first week, according to Billboard Japan. The lead track "SuperCali" became the group's first song that spent two weeks in top six of Japan Hot 100.

== Background and release ==
On August 25, 2022, during a live Instagram talk session, JO1 announced that their sixth EP single, Midnight Sun, was set to be released on October 12. The concept of the single was set "between dreams and reality" and centered around the message that "in this strange world, we can do everything". It expressed "the pain felt in the process of growing up by likening it to the fear felt in a strange world where night and day is uncertain".

The EP single consists of four songs accompanied with the instrumental version of each song, which were released into three physical editions. The two limited editions each features four tracks and comes with a DVD bundle consisting a variety segment called Weird World (Weird House) and Weird World (Weird Spell), respectively. The normal edition comes with a CD-only and consists of six tracks. A special digital version consisting all songs and an instrumental version of "SuperCali" was released on October 10, 2022.

== Lead track ==
The lead track "SuperCali" is described to contain "a strong conviction that JO1 will continue to grow and burn with passion in every cell of their body". It was composed in the key of G-sharp minor and 144 beats per minute. The title is abbreviation for the English compound word "supercalifragilisticexpialidocious", popularized by the 1964 film Mary Poppins. The word was introduced as one that "makes infinite possibilities come true" before the song was performed for the first time at the last Fukuoka show of the 2022 JO1 1st Arena Live Tour "Kizuna" on September 22, 2022. "SuperCali" was made available for streaming on midnight the next day along with its performance video, which gained 10 millions views in just two weeks. It was debuted for public on NHK's Utacon on October 4, 2022. A music video was released on the same day as the release of the single physical editions, which eventually became the first music video of the group to surpass 20 millions views, and went on to reach 39 millions views by the end of October 2022.

The song peaked at number 18 the Billboard Japan Hot 100 and number 14 on the Oricon Combined Singles Chart, before earning second and first place on the two charts, respectively, after the CD release. "SuperCali" topped four chart components on Japan Hot 100 for CD sales, look-up, radio, and Twitter, but lost just shy of 30 points overall "in a fierce battle" against Kenshi Yonezu's "Kick Back". "SuperCali" eventually became the group's first song that spent two weeks in top six of Japan Hot 100.

== Promotion ==
As part of the promotion, JO1 performed "SuperCali" at Rakuten GirlsAward 2022 Autumn/Winter on October 8, 2022. They also performed the Korean version of "SuperCali" and debuted another track from the single "Rose" at KCON 2022 Japan on October 15, 2022. The song was also performed during the group's appearance at the 2022 MTV Video Music Awards Japan and the 2022 MAMA Awards where they received an award for Best Live Performance and Favorite Asian Artist, respectively. Performance videos for the tracks "Rose" and "Phobia" were also subsequently released.

Furthermore, JO1 was selected as the ambassador for the Halloween hashtag event on TikTok Japan, starting from October 17 to November 2, which includes several promotional stunts to further promote "SuperCali". They also held a showcase event in Tokyo on November 4 where they performed three songs from the single alongside one song from their previous single, Wandering, in front of 1,000 fans.

== Commercial performance ==
Midnight Sun debuted at number one on Oricon Daily Singles Chart with 365,602 copies sold. It eventually managed to be the group's sixth consecutive number-one on the weekly chart with 492,000 copies sold, surpassing their previous single, Wandering, and set a personal record for both physical and combined sales. It also earned JO1 their new personal record on Billboard Japan, topping Top Singles Sales as the group's first single with over 600,000 copies sold on its first week. It was subsequently certified Double Platinum by the Recording Industry Association of Japan. By the end of 2022, the single ranked ninth on the Billboard Japan's annual single sales chart with 664,550 physical copies sold.

== Track listing ==
"SuperCali" and "Phobia" are common tracks 1 and 2 for all editions.

Track listing of Midnight Sun – Limited edition A
No.	Title	Lyrics	Music	Arrangement	Length
1.	"SuperCali"	Kako; Yoske; Baek Joo Yeun (Alive Knob); Toru Ishikawa; T-MS	Nmore; Poptime; Ronnie Icon; Kyler Niko; Shannon; Gesture; Kohway; Elum	Nmore; Poptime	3:02
2.	"Phobia"	KZ; B.O; Shiho Takahashi	KZ; Honeysweat; B.O	Honeysweat	3:31
3.	"16 (Sixteen)"	Jinli (Full8loom); Ellie Love	Gloryface (Full8loom); Jinli; Harry (Full8loom)	Gloryface; Harry	3:19
4.	"SuperCali" (instrumental)				3:02
Total length:					12:54

Track listing of Midnight Sun – Limited edition B
No.	Title	Lyrics	Music	Arrangement	Length
3.	"Rose"	Jung Ho-hyun (e.one); Teito; Takumi Yumieda; Kikue	Jung Ho-hyun; Teito	Teito; Jung Ho-hyun	3:21
4.	"Phobia" (instrumental)				3:31
Total length:					13:25

Track listing of Midnight Sun – Normal edition
No.	Title	Length
3.	"16 (Sixteen)"	3:19
4.	"Rose"	3:21
5.	"16 (Sixteen)" (instrumental)	3:19
6.	"Rose" (instrumental)	3:21
Total length:		19:53

Track listing of Midnight Sun – Special edition
No.	Title	Length
3.	"16 (Sixteen)"	3:19
4.	"Rose"	3:21
5.	"SuperCali" (instrumental)	3:02
Total length:		16:15

Track listing of Midnight Sun – Limited edition A (DVD)
No.	Title	Length
1.	"Weird World (Weird House)" (Weird World 〜おかしな家編〜, Weird House (Okashina Iehen))

Track listing of Midnight Sun – Limited edition B (DVD)
No.	Title	Length
1.	"Weird World (Weird Spell)" (Weird World 〜おかしな呪文編〜, Weird Spell (Okashina Jumonhen))

== Charts ==
=== Weekly charts ===
Chart performance for Midnight Sun
Chart (2022)	Peak position
Japan (Oricon)	1
Japan Combined Singles (Oricon)	1
Japan Top Singles Sales (Billboard Japan)	1

=== Monthly charts ===
Monthly chart performance for Midnight Sun
Chart (2022)	Peak position
Japan (Oricon)	1

=== Year-end charts ===
2022 year-end chart performance for Midnight Sun
Chart (2022)	Position
Japan (Oricon)	11
Japan Combined Singles (Oricon)	23
Japan Top Singles Sales (Billboard Japan)	9

== Certifications ==
Certifications and sales for Midnight Sun
Region	Certification	Certified units/sales
Japan (RIAJ)	2× Platinum	500,000^{^}
^{^} Shipments figures based on certification alone.

== Release history ==
Release dates and formats for Midnight Sun
Region	Date	Label	Format	Edition	Catalog
Various	October 10, 2022	Lapone Entertainment	Download; streaming	Special	—N/a
Japan	October 12, 2022	Lapone Entertainment	CD; DVD	Limited A	YRCS-90220
Japan	October 12, 2022	Lapone Entertainment	CD; DVD	Limited B	YRCS-90221
Japan	October 12, 2022	Lapone Entertainment	CD	Normal	YRCS-90222
