= Equinox (JO1 album) =

- Normal edition cover

Studio album by JO1
- Released: September 20, 2023
- Recorded: 2022–2023
- Genre: J-pop
- Length: 39:33 (Limited edition A); 39:21 (Limited edition B); 49:14 (Normal edition); 48:59 (Fan Club edition); 52:16 (Special edition)
- Language: Japanese
- Label: Lapone Entertainment

JO1 chronology
Kizuna (2022)	Equinox (2023)	Be Classic (2025)

Singles from Equinox
- 1. "Midnight Sun" Released: October 12, 2022; 2. "Tropical Night" Released: April 5, 2023

Equinox (stylized in all caps) is the third studio album by Japanese boy band JO1. It includes songs from their past EP releases, Midnight Sun and Tropical Night. Lapone Entertainment released the album in five editions on September 20, 2023, with "Venus" and "Radiovision" serving as the main promotional single. It was the group's first release with unit songs and digipack packaging. Notable contributors include Sunwoo of The Boyz, Masami Kakinuma, and members of JO1.

Equinox was preceded by two promotional digital singles: "NEWSmile", the theme of the Japanese morning news show Mezamashi 8, and "Gradation", from the film When the Dawn Breaks, I’ll Be the First to See You , starring member Ruki Shiroiwa. The album was also supported by the Beyond the Dark tour, which ran from August to December 2023 and included stops in Asia and Kyocera Dome Osaka.

The album marked JO1's second consecutive number-one album on the Oricon and Billboard Japan charts. It was also the first time JO1 had topped combined sales, physical sales and download component charts on both publications.

== Background and release ==
On June 29, 2023, JO1 announced that their third album, Equinox, was slated to be released on September 20. The theme of the album was said to be "the moment when light and darkness completely confront each other, we break through the boundary between dreams and reality". It features a total of 16 songs, with eight of them are selected songs from the group's two previous EP singles, while the rest are eight new songs, including "NEWSmile", the theme of the Japanese morning news show Mezamashi 8, and "Gradation", from the film When the Dawn Breaks, I’ll Be the First to See You , which starred member Ruki Shiroiwa.

The album was released into four physical editions, including selected songs from JO1's two previous singles, Midnight Sun and Tropical Night, as well as two promotional singles, "RadioVision" and "Venus". The two limited editions each features 12 tracks and comes with a digipack packaging and a DVD consisting of a variety segment. Both the CD-only normal edition and the fan club edition, which comes with a folder case packaging and a photo book, feature 15 tracks.

== Promotion ==
On September 18, 2023, JO1 headlined CDTV Live! Live! Festival 2023 at Tokyo Garden Theater. The group performed seven songs from the album, including "Venus" and "Radiovision". On the album's release day, JO1 appeared on MBC Music's Show Champion, followed by M Countdown the following day. It's the first time the group has commemorated a release day outside Japan, instead of interacting with fans via a YouTube livestream. On September 30, JO1 performed "Venus" at Fuji TV's Music Fair. On October 20, JO1 made their debut on TV Asahi's prime time music program, Music Station, performing a medley of "Venus", "SuperCali", and "Trigger". They were the second non-Johnny & Associates and LDH boy band to perform on the show following public criticism of the former's alleged influence in domestic rival groups' inability to appear on the show emerged.

=== Singles ===
The album's lead single, Midnight Sun, was released on October 15, 2022, with "SuperCali" as the lead single, whose title is derived from the English compound word "supercalifragilisticexpialidocious". The single is JO1's first to sell over 600,000 copies in its release week on the Billboard Japan chart, with "SuperCali" becoming the group's first song to spend two weeks in the top six of the Japan Hot 100.

Tropical Night was released on April 5, 2023, becoming the group's seventh consecutive Oricon number-one single. The lead track, "Tiger", was performed at Hanshin Koshien Stadium to open the Hanshin Tigers vs. Hiroshima Toyo Carp match. It topped Japan Hot 100 was the group's debut entry on Billboard's Hot Trending Songs.

=== Promotional singles ===
The first promotional single, "NEWSmile", was released as the theme song for the morning news show Mezamashi 8, with music chosen and lyrics written by JO1 members. Aside from being published digitally on July 3, the song was sold via QR codes attached to "Charming Daily Goods" (CD Goods) sold at a one-week pop-up store JO1 Mart in Shibuya, Tokyo, beginning on July 24, 2023. In an interview with Natalie, Choi Shin-hwa, CEO of Lapone Entertainment, stated that it was a move for the group and company to explore different ways of releasing music. The project received the gold award from the ACC Tokyo Creativity Awards. "NEWSmile" debuted at number 58 on the Japan Hot 100. It was performed on Fuji TV's 2023 FNS Music Festival Summer.

"Radiovision" was released on August 7, 2023, as one of the album's two main promotional songs. Having been described as a "funky disco dance song", the song encourages listeners to "enjoy the memories we're currently making together". It debuted in front of an audience at Ariake Arena in Tokyo on the opening day of the Beyond the Dark tour. The Korean version of the song was performed at KCON LA 2023 on August 20, and the music video was released the following day.

"Gradation" is the third promotional single from the album and was released on August 31, 2023, as the theme song of the film When the Dawn Breaks, I’ll Be the First to See You , featuring member Ruki Shiroiwa. The song was also performed for the first time at the Aichi show of Beyond the Dark tour on the same day.

The last and second main promotional single, "Venus", was released on September 17, 2023, alongside its music video. Sunwoo of the South Korean boy band The Boyz participated in the production of the song.

== Concert tours ==
=== Beyond the Dark ===
2023 JO1 2nd Arena Live Tour "Beyond the Dark"
- Japan tour by JO1
- Associated album: Equinox
- Start date: 5 August 2023
- End date: 25 November 2023
- No. of shows: 15

JO1 concert chronology
- Kizuna Arena Tour (2022); Beyond the Dark (2023); Beyond the Dark – Limited Edition (2023)

To promote Equinox, JO1 embarked on their second arena tour, titled Beyond the Dark. They toured Tokyo, Aichi, Miyagi, Hiroshima, Fukuoka, and Osaka, with a total of 13 shows from August 5 to October 19, 2023. JO1 debuted "Radiovision" at the first show and added more songs from the album to the setlist as the tour progressed. The tour was fully supported by a live band and included exclusive unit performances as well as a camera-approved encore. A two-day encore concert in the Kyocera Dome in Osaka, which would be the group's first dome performance, was also announced at the first show. The dome concert featured unit songs from the album and air balloons for members to greet the audience in high seats. A live stream was available for the first day of the concert via Lemino and StreamPass. The four-month domestic tour attracted approximately 200,000 people. The thirty songs performed in Kyocera Dome were released as a digital album on November 6, 2024.

The set list for the October 19 show in Osaka and the November 24 show in Kyocera Dome are the following:

Osaka set list
1. "SuperCali"
2. "Rose"
3. "Trigger"
4. "Comma,"
5. "Phobia"
6. "Untitled Perf.#1" (Kawashiri, Shiroiwa)
7. "We Can Fly" (Ohira, Kimata, Tsurubo)
8. "Run&Go"
9. "NEWSmile"
10. "We Good"
11. "Touch!"
12. "Born to be Wild"
13. "Radiovision"
14. "Oh-Eh-Oh"
15. "Monstar"
16. "Ryūseiu" (流星雨, 'Meteor Shower')
17. "Romance"
18. "Oasis"
19. "Gradation"
20. "With Us"
21. "Untitled Perf.#2" (Kawanishi, Sato, Mamehara)
22. "Algorithm"
23. "Walk It Like I Talk It"
24. "Speed of Light"
25. "Tiger"

Encore

26. "Venus"
27. "Forever Here"
Kyocera Dome set list
1. "SuperCali"
2. "Rose"
3. "Trigger"
4. "Comma,"
5. "Fairytale"
6. "Fairytale Epilogue" (Kawashiri, Shiroiwa)
7. "We Can Fly" (Ohira, Kimata, Tsurubo)
8. "Run&Go"
9. "NEWSmile"
10. "Hideout"
11. "Radiovision"
12. "Itty Bitty" (Ohira, Kawashiri, Kawanishi, Kimata, Shiroiwa, Mamehara)
13. "Eyes On Me" (feat. R3hab)
14. "Oh-Eh-Oh"
15. "Voice" (君の声, 'Your Voice') (Yonashiro, Kono, Kinjo)
16. "Gradation"
17. "Romance"
18. "Prologue"
19. "Venus"
20. "Mad In Love" (Kinjo, Kono, Sato, Tsurubo, Yonashiro)
21. "With Us"
22. "Breaking the Rules" (Kawanishi, Sato, Mamehara)
23. "Algorithm"
24. "Walk It Like I Talk It"
25. "Speed of Light"
26. "YOLO-konde"
27. "Tiger"

Encore

28. "We Good"
29. "Touch"
30. "Bokura no Kisetsu"

Double encore

31. "Infinity"

=== Beyond the Dark – Limited Edition ===
2023 JO1 1st Asia Tour "Beyond the Dark" Limited Edition
- Asia tour by JO1
- Associated album: Equinox
- Start date: 1 November 2023
- End date: 11 November 2023
- No. of shows: 4

JO1 concert chronology
- Beyond the Dark (2023); Beyond the Dark – Limited Edition (2023)

JO1 announced their first Asian tour at Lapone Entertainment's first joint concert, Laposta 2023, on May 31, 2023. The group is set to tour Jakarta, Bangkok and Taipei in November, between Beyond the Dark tour and its encore performance in Kyocera Dome, with a Shanghai show closing the tour on December 8. JO1 debuted "Eyes On Me" feat. R3hab on the Jakarta show on November 1, 2023. The set list also includes an acoustic version of "Bokura no Kisetsu".

== Commercial performance ==
Equinox debuted at number one on the Oricon Daily Albums Chart with 185,011 copies sold and went on to become the group's second consecutive number-one album on the Oricon Combined Albums and Billboard Japan Hot Albums charts. The album marked the first time JO1 to rank atop combined sales, physical sales, and download component charts on both publications, propelling them to the top of the Billboard Japan Artist 100. The album eventually sold over 263,919 copies by the end of the year and ranked fifteen on Oricon's year-end chart.

== Track listing ==
Track listing of Equinox – Limited edition A (CD)
No.	Title	Lyrics	Music	Arrangement	Length
1.	"Venus"	Kevin_D (D_answer); Kamihate (D_answer); Gratia	Kevin_D; Helixx; Kamihate; Sunwoo (The Boyz)	Kevin_D; Helixx	3:18
2.	"Radiovision"	K.O (Decade +); Celotron (Decade +); Hyun-seong	K.O; Celotron; Shrinjay Ghosh (Decade +)	K.O; Celotron; Ghosh	3:21
3.	"Dot-Dot-Dot"	Chiaki Nagasawa; Ryo Ito; Jinli (Full8loom)	Gloryface (Full8loom); Jinli	Gloryface	3:14
4.	"Itty Bitty" (performed by Ohira, Kawashiri, Kawanishi, Kimata, Shiroiwa, Mamehara)	Shiho Takahashi; Masami Kakinuma; Jeffrey The Kidd; Anna Timgren	Stian Nyhammer Olsen (Blueprint); Lars Horn Lavik; The Kidd; Timgren	Olsen; Lavik	3:19
5.	"NEWSmile"	Syoya; Junki; Sukai; Sho; Shosei	Tsingtao; Samuel Kim; Rico Sato; Hiddie; Ito	Sato; Hiddie	3:21
6.	"Tiger"	Ellie Love; Stainboys; Nu'maker; Asher Postman	Postman; Hautboi Rich	Postman	3:05
7.	"Trigger"	Bicksancho (Yummytone); Mospick; Elli Love	Bicksancho; Mospick	Bicksancho; Mospick	3:04
8.	"Gradation"	T2; Love; Ume	Yuki; Dennis Chang; Ruimui (Paper Maker)	Yuki; Dennis Chang; Ruimui (Paper Maker)	3:17
9.	"SuperCali"	Kako; Yoske; Baek Joo Yeun (Alive Knob); Toru Ishikawa; T-MS	Nmore; Poptime; Ronnie Icon; Kyler Niko; Shannon; Gesture; Kohway; Elum	Nmore; Poptime	3:02
10.	"Phobia"	KZ; B.O; Shiho Takahashi	KZ; Honeysweat; B.O	Honeysweat	3:31
11.	"Comma,"	Jung Ho-hyun (e.one); Kaori Morikawa	Jung	Jung	3:05
12.	"Romance"	Kako; Mine Kushita	Kako; Pop Time; One. Ki; Nmore	Daily; Nmore; Pop Time	3:56
Total length:					39:33

Track listing of Equinox – Limited edition A (DVD)
No.	Title	Length
1.	"JO! Challenge"

Track listing of Equinox – Limited edition B (CD)
No.	Title	Lyrics	Music	Arrangement	Length
1.	"Venus"				3:18
2.	"Radiovision"				3:21
3.	"Fairytale"	Kakinuma; Icon	Lee Won-joung; Icon; Niko; Ninos Hana; William Segerdahl; One.Ki; Celotron; Taneisha Jackson; Charlotte Wilson; Bobii Lewis; Anne Judith Wik; Young Chance; Gxxdkelvin	Lee	2:58
4.	"Mad In Love" (performed by Kinjo, Kono, Sato, Tsurubo, Yonashiro)	Sqvare; Avenue 52; Tsingtao; Ito	Alysa; Phil Schwan; Sqvare; Avenue 52; Ricki Ejderkvist	Alysa; Schwan; Ejderkvist	3:24
5.	"NEWSmile"				3:21
6.	"SuperCali"				3:02
7.	"Phobia"				3:31
8.	"We Good"	Moon Kim; T2; K2; Anna Kusakawa; Hasegawa; Mion Yano	Moon Kim; RHeat; SUA	SUA; RHeat	3:02
9.	"Tiger"				3:05
10.	"Trigger"				3:04
11.	"16 (Sixteen)"	Jinli; Love	Gloryface; Jinli; Harry (Full8loom)	Gloryface; Harry	3:19
12.	"Romance"				3:56
Total length:					39:21

Track listing of Equinox – Limited edition B (DVD)
No.	Title	Length
1.	"Global Cooking"

Track listing of Equinox – Normal edition (CD)
No.	Title	Length
1.	"Venus"	3:18
2.	"Radiovision"	3:21
3.	"Dot-Dot-Dot"	3:14
4.	"Fairytale"	2:58
5.	"Itty Bitty" (performed by Ohira, Kawashiri, Kawanishi, Kimata, Shiroiwa, Mamehara)	3:19
6.	"Mad In Love" (performed by Kinjo, Kono, Sato, Tsurubo, Yonashiro)	3:24
7.	"NEWSmile"	3:21
8.	"Gradation"	3:17
9.	"Tiger"	3:05
10.	"Trigger"	3:04
11.	"Comma,"	3:05
12.	"Romance"	3:56
13.	"SuperCali"	3:02
14.	"Phobia"	3:31
15.	"16 (Sixteen)"	3:19
Total length:		49:14

Track listing of Equinox – Fan Club edition (CD)
No.	Title	Length
1.	"Venus"	3:18
2.	"Radiovision"	3:21
3.	"Fairytale"	2:58
4.	"Dot-Dot-Dot"	3:14
5.	"Mad In Love" (performed by Kinjo, Kono, Sato, Tsurubo, Yonashiro)	3:24
6.	"Itty Bitty" (performed by Ohira, Kawashiri, Kawanishi, Kimata, Shiroiwa, Mamehara)	3:19
7.	"NEWSmile"	3:21
8.	"We Good"	3:02
9.	"SuperCali"	3:02
10.	"Phobia"	3:31
11.	"16 (Sixteen)"	3:19
12.	"Romance"	3:56
13.	"Tiger"	3:05
14.	"Trigger"	3:04
15.	"Comma,"	3:05
Total length:		48:59

Track listing of Equinox – Special edition (digital)
No.	Title	Length
1.	"Venus"	3:18
2.	"Radiovision"	3:21
3.	"Dot-Dot-Dot"	3:14
4.	"Fairytale"	2:58
5.	"Itty Bitty" (performed by Ohira, Kawashiri, Kawanishi, Kimata, Shiroiwa, Mamehara)	3:19
6.	"Mad In Love" (performed by Kinjo, Kono, Sato, Tsurubo, Yonashiro)	3:24
7.	"NEWSmile"	3:21
8.	"Gradation"	3:17
9.	"Tiger"	3:05
10.	"Trigger"	3:04
11.	"Comma,"	3:05
12.	"Romance"	3:56
13.	"SuperCali"	3:02
14.	"Phobia"	3:31
15.	"16 (Sixteen)"	3:19
16.	"We Good"	3:02
Total length:		52:16

== Credits and personnel ==
Credits are adapted from the album's liner notes. Track listing is based on Equinox special edition.

Musicians and vocals

- JO1 – vocals (all tracks)
- Kevin_D (D_answer) – vocal direction (1), chorus (1)
- 1000 (D_answer) – vocal direction (1, 5), chorus (5)
- Helixx – drum (1), bass (1)
- Lim Young-woo – piano (1),
- Vendors (Zenur) – guitar (1),
- Dono – vocal direction (2), chorus (2)
- Shrinjay Ghosh (Decade +) - drum (2), bass (2), keyboard (2), synthesizer (2), guitar (2)
- Celotron (Decade +) - bass (2), guitar (2)
- K.O (Decade +) - keyboard (2), synthesizer (2)
- Lee Ji-won – chorus (3, 15)
- Kim Ju-yeong – chorus (3, 15)
- Jang Jun-ho – drum (3, 15), bass (3, 15), keyboard (3, 15), synthesizer (3, 15), guitar (3), programming (3), piano (15)
- Jung Jin-woo – chorus (4)
- Lee Won-joung – drum (4), bass (4), keyboard (4), synthesizer (4), guitar (4)
- Stian Nyhammer Olsen – drum (5), keyboard (5), synthesizer (5)
- Lars Horn Lavik – keyboard (5)
- Gesture – vocal direction (6), chorus (6)
- Alysa – drum (6), bass (6), keyboard (6), synthesizer (6), electric guitar (6)
- Phil Schwan – drum (6), bass (6), keyboard (6), synthesizer (6), electric guitar (6)
- Rocki Ejderkvist – drum (6)
- Samuel Kim – chorus (7)
- Hiddie – guitar (7), bass (7)
- Dennis Chang – synthesizer (8),
- Ruimui (Papermaker) – piano (8)
- Yuki – guitar (8)
- Asher Postman – chorus (9), drum (9), bass (9), keyboard (9), synthesizer (9)
- Unamean – chorus (9)
- Cho Sung-ho – chorus (10)
- Son Young-jin – keyboard (10)
- Biksancho – synthesizer (10)
- Heon-seo – chorus (11)
- Jung Ho-hyun – keyboard (11)
- Heon-seo – chorus (12)
- Nmore – keyboard (12, 13), synthesizer (13)
- Pop Time – keyboard (12), synthesizer (13)
- Daily – keyboard (12)
- Hungi Hong – guitar (12)
- Ju-0 – chorus (13)
- Honeysweet – MIDI programming (14), drum (14), bass (14), synthesizer (14)
- B.O – chorus (14)
- KZ – chorus (14)
- Kim Hyo-min – drum (15), bass (15), piano (15), keyboard (15), synthesizer (15)
- Chung Soo-wan – guitar (15)
- Mook – chorus (16)
- SUA – keyboard (16)
- Rheat – guitar (16)

Technical

- Tatsuya "Tatz" Kawakami – recording (1–6, 8–12),
- Osamu Shiota – recording (7, 16)
- Lee Jeong-bin – recording (13)
- Kim Min-hee – recording (14, 15)
- Mo – digital editing (1),
- Woo Min-jung – digital editing (2)
- Lee Ji-won – digital editing (3)
- Lee Won-joung – digital editing (4)
- Hong Soo-yeon – digital editing (5)
- Ahn Chang-kyu – digital editing (5, 8)
- Park Nam-jun – digital editing (9, 16), asst. mixing (12)
- Kwon Eugene – digital editing (10, 12)
- Jung Ho-hyun – digital editing (11)
- Wang Bo-kyeong – digital editing (14)
- CH – digital editing (13)
- Jang Jun-ho – digital editing (15)
- Uncle Jo – mixing (1, 3, 11, 15),
- Yoon Won-kwon – mixing (2, 14)
- Gu Jong-pil – mixing (4, 9, 10, 13)
- Stay Tuned – mixing (5)
- Shin Bong-won – mixing (6, 8, 12, 16)
- U-Kirin – mixing (7)
- Kang Dong-ho – asst. mixing (1, 3, 11, 15),
- Kwon Nam-woo – mastering (1–6, 8, 9–16)
- Masato Morisaki – mastering (7)

Locations

- Prime Sound Studio Form – recording (1, 5, 6),
- Freedom Studio Infinity - recording (2–4, 6, 9–11)
- Sound Valley – recording (7, 8)
- Mixer's Lab – recording (12)
- Oden Studio – recording (16)
- Vibe Music Studio 606 – digital editing (1),
- Wakeone Studio – digital editing (5, 13)
- ONR Studio – digital editing (5, 8)
- Doobdoob Studio – digital editing (10, 12), recording (13)
- JoeLab – mixing (1, 3, 11, 15),
- Studio DDeepKick – mixing (2, 14)
- Klang Studio – mixing (4, 9, 10, 13)
- Stay Tuned Studio – mixing (5)
- Glab Studio – mixing (6, 8, 9, 12, 16), digital editing (16)
- KRN Studio – mixing (7)
- 821 Sound – mastering (1–6, 8–16), recording (14, 15)
- Artisans Mastering – mastering (7)

Visual and designs

- Kim Tae-hwan – photography
- Yoo Yeo-jung – set design
- Kim Ah-mi (Studio Muet) – album design
- Roh Yun-ah (Studio Muet) – album design
- Lim Sul-i – style director
- Lee Jae-hee – style director
- Hero (Bit & Boot) – hair
- Choi Soo-chan (Bit & Boot) – hair
- Jung Bo-young (Gloss) – make-up
- Park Yun-gi (Gloss) – make-up
- Jeon Ji-hoon (Sl8ight Visual Lab) – MV director (1)
- Lee In-hoon (Segaji Video) – MV director (2)
- Choi Young-jun (Teamsame) – choreography (1)
- Kim Beom (MOTF) – choreography (1)
- Park Hae-ri (MOTF) – choreography (1)
- Baek Xion (ALILT) – choreography (2)
- Yun Young-ji (ALILT) – choreography (2)

== Charts ==
=== Weekly charts ===
Weekly chart performance for Equinox
Chart (2023)	Peak position
Japanese Albums (Oricon)	1
Japanese Combined Albums (Oricon)	1
Japanese Hot Albums (Billboard Japan)	1

=== Year-end charts ===
2023 year-end chart performance for Equinox
Chart (2023)	Position
Japanese Albums (Oricon)	15
Japanese Combined Albums (Oricon)	22
Japanese Hot Albums (Billboard Japan)	14

== Certifications ==
Certifications and sales for Equinox
Region	Certification	Certified units/sales
Japan (RIAJ)	Platinum	250,000^{^}
^{^} Shipments figures based on certification alone.

== Release history ==
Release dates and formats for Equinox
Region	Date	Label	Format	Edition	Catalog
Japan	September 20, 2023	Lapone Entertainment	CD; DVD; digipack	Limited A	YRCS-95114
Japan	September 20, 2023	Lapone Entertainment	CD; DVD; digipack	Limited B	YRCS-95115
Japan	September 20, 2023	Lapone Entertainment	CD; jewel case	Normal	YRCS-95116
Japan	September 20, 2023	Lapone Entertainment	CD; photo book; folder case	Fan Club	YRCF-91018
Various	September 20, 2023	Lapone Entertainment	Download; streaming	Special	—N/a
