= Sekido =

Sekido (written: 関戸) is a Japanese surname. Notable people with the surname include:

- Kenji Sekido (関戸 健二, born 1990), Japanese footballer
- Naomi Sekido (関戸 直美, born 1969), Japanese swimmer
- Tsutomu Sekido (関戸 力, 1915–1987), Japanese skier
