= Protostar (EP) =

- Normal edition cover

Single by JO1

from the album The Star
- Language: Japanese
- A-side: "Infinity"
- Released: March 4, 2020
- Recorded: 2019–2020
- Genre: J-pop
- Length: 14:17 (Limited edition A); 13:38 (Limited edition B); 14:00 (Normal edition)
- Label: Lapone Entertainment
- Producers: KZ; Kim Seung-soo; Nthonious; EastWest; D.stus; Holy M; KCKT; Coach & Sendo; Eunsol (1008); Seo Yi-sung

JO1 singles chronology
"Protostar" (2020)	"Stargazer" (2020)

Music video
- "無限大(INFINITY)" on YouTube

Protostar (stylized in all caps) is an extended play (EP) marketed as the debut single of Japanese boy band JO1, formed through the reality competition show Produce 101 Japan. It also served as the lead single for their first studio album, The Star (2020). The single was released by Lapone Entertainment in three different editions on March 4, 2020, consisting of songs performed on the final episode of the show and three new songs. It features the participation of various South Korean songwriters and production teams such as KZ, Kim Seung-soo, Nthonious, KCKT, Ryan S. Jhun, Andrew Choi, and others.

Upon its release, the single earned the top spot on the Oricon Singles Chart and was certified Platinum by the Recording Industry Association of Japan. According to Oricon, JO1 was the seventh artist to sell over 300,000 copies of a debut single n its first week. The lead track, "Infinity", also topped the Billboard Japan Hot 100.

== Background and release ==
Shortly after the end of Produce 101 Japan, JO1 flew to South Korea to prepare and produce their first single. On January 14, it was announced that the group's debut EP single, Protostar, would be released on March 4, 2020, with "Infinity" as the lead track. A concept trailer was released on January 28. To help promote the single, an animated music video for "Running" and a short performance video of "La Pa Pa Pam" were also released. To commemorate the release, JO1 held a special live streaming event on the group's official social media accounts.

Protostar features of songs performed on the last final of the show and three new songs, released in three different editions. The first edition is a limited CD and DVD bundle that includes a behind-the-scenes video of "Infinity" and a talk segment with members. The second edition is a limited bundle of CD and photo booklet. The final edition is a standard CD-only edition that includes the new songs "Infinity", "Running", and "La Pa Pa Pam".

== Lead track ==
"Infinity" combines several musical genres, including hip hop, EDM, and house music. The song was premiered on J-Wave's radio program, Step One, on February 5, 2020. The full version of the music video was released on February 16 and was directed by Beomjin of VM Project Architecture. According to member Sho Yonashiro, Protostar represents the group's desire to transform from regular people to stars, while "Infinity" embodies JO1's infinite possibilities and growth. Celebrating the fifth anniversary of JO1's debut, the rock version of the song, "Infinity 2025", was released on March 4, 2025. It was later included in the group's first greatest hits album Be Classic.

Upon release, "Infinity" led other songs from the EP single on the Billboard Japan Hot 100, scoring first that week and eventually finishing fiftieth place on the chart's year-end rankings. The song was used as the theme song for the TV commercial of ABC-Mart x Nike's project titled Nike One, as well as the ending song for TV Asahi's show, Sonna Koto Kangaetakoto Nakatta Quiz! Torinikku-tte Nanno Niku!?, and Kansai TV's variety show Chihara Junior no Zao.

== Promotion ==
On March 24, 2020, JO1 made their first live appearance on a television program, performing "Infinity" on NTV's morning show Sukkiri. On May 4, the group gave a special "home performance" of "La Pa Pa Pam" on Mezamashi Uchi Festival, a special episode of Fuji TV's Mezamashi TV due to the COVID-19 restrictions. The performance featured images of the members performing at home as well as engaging in home various activities. JO1 then performed remotely on several TV shows, such as Love Music and NHK's Shibuya Note. On June 21, JO1 performed songs from the single at the KCON:TACT 2020 Summer, making them the first Japanese boy group to participate in the convention.

== Commercial performance ==
Protostar debuted at number one on the Oricon Daily Singles Chart and Billboard Japan Top Single Sales. It topped the chart for seven consecutive days and finished first on the weekly chart with 327,187 copies sold, making JO1 the seventh artist that managed to sell over 300,000 copies in the first week of a debut single. The single was certified Platinum by the Recording Industry Association of Japan for shipments of more than 250,000 units. The single's sales helped JO1 to become second best-selling new artist, by earning an estimated 640 million yen according to Oricon. By the end of 2020, the single had sold 372,820 copies, placing it thirteenth on the Oricon and fourteenth on the Billboard Japan's year-end charts.

== Track listing ==
"Infinity" and "Tsukame" are common track 1 and 4, respectively, for all editions.

Track listing of Protostar – Limited edition A
No.	Title	Lyrics	Music	Arrangement	Length
1.	"Infinity" (無限大, Mugendai)	KZ; B.O; B.Eyes	KZ; Nthonius; B.O; Kim Seung-soo	KZ; Nthonius; Kim Seung-soo	3:04
2.	"Running"	Yoske; Seion	EastWest; Yoske	EastWest; D.stus; Holy M	3:51
3.	"Young" (JO1 ver.)	Sun; Uno Buckx; Kaine	Sun; Versachoi	Versachoi	3:24
4.	"Tsukame (It's Coming)" (ツカメ ～It's Coming～; JO1 ver.)	Kanata Nakamura	Ryan S. Jhun; Andrew Choi; Eunsol (1008); Dawn; Bintage; Seo Yi-sung	Eunsol; Seo Yi-sung	3:58
Total length:					14:17

Track listing of Protostar – Limited edition B
No.	Title	Lyrics	Music	Arrangement	Length
2.	"La Pa Pa Pam"	Young Jay (KCKT); Buggy (KCKT); Ven (KCKT); Rosieblue	Young Jay; Buggy; Ven	Young Jay; Buggy; Ven	3:09
3.	"GrandMaster" (JO1 ver.)	Coach & Sendo; Hasegawa	Coach & Sendo; Yuki	Coach & Sendo	3:28
Total length:					13:38

Track listing of Protostar – Normal edition
No.	Title	Length
2.	"Running"	3:50
3.	"La Pa Pa Pam"	3:08
Total length:		14:00

Track listing of Protostar – Limited edition A (DVD)
No.	Title	Length
1.	"Making video + JO1 Secrets"	47:00
Total length:		47:00

== Charts ==
=== Weekly charts ===
Weekly chart performance for Protostar
Chart (2020)	Peak position
Japan (Oricon)	1
Japan Combined Singles (Oricon)	1
Japan Top Singles Sales (Billboard Japan)	1

=== Monthly charts ===
Monthly chart performance for Protostar
Chart (2020)	Peak position
Japan (Oricon)	3

=== Year-end charts ===
2020 year-end chart performance for Protostar
Chart (2020)	Position
Japan (Oricon)	13
Japan Combined Singles (Oricon)	24
Japan Top Singles Sales (Billboard Japan)	14

== Certifications ==
Certifications and sales for Protostar
Region	Certification	Certified units/sales
Japan (RIAJ)	Platinum	250,000^{^}
^{^} Shipments figures based on certification alone.

== Release history ==
Release dates and formats for Protostar
Region	Date	Label	Format	Type	Catalog
Japan	March 4, 2020	Lapone Entertainment	CD; DVD	Limited A	YRCS-90173
Japan	March 4, 2020	Lapone Entertainment	CD; photo booklet	Limited B	YRCS-90174
Japan	March 4, 2020	Lapone Entertainment	CD	Normal	YRCS-90175
Various	March 4, 2020	Lapone Entertainment	Download; streaming	Limited A	—N/a
Various	March 4, 2020	Lapone Entertainment	Download; streaming	Limited B	—N/a
Various	March 4, 2020	Lapone Entertainment	Download; streaming	Normal	—N/a
