= Produce 101 Japan season 1 =

2019 Japanese reality competition show

Produce 101 Japan
- Season 1
- Promotional visual
- Native name
- Katakana: プロデュース ワンオーワン ジャパン
Transcriptions
- Romanization: Purodyūsu Wanōwan Japan
- Presented by: Hiroyuki Yabe; Takashi Okamura
- Judges: Hidenori Sugai; Sayaka Yasukura; A-non; Warner; Cypress Ueno; Bose
- No. of contestants: 101
- Winner: JO1
- Location: Japan
- No. of episodes: 12

Release
- Original network: TBS; GyaO!
- Original release: September 25 – December 11, 2019

Season chronology
- Next → Season 2

Produce 101 Japan (プロデュース ワンオーワン ジャパン) is a 2019 Japanese reality competition show, co-produced by Yoshimoto Kogyo and CJ E&M. It is a spin-off of the South Korean Produce 101 franchise. The show follows 101 contestants with the intention of producing a permanent eleven-member boy group.

It premiered on September 25, 2019, on TBS. The first episode was rerun on the streaming platform GyaO! the following day, which also broadcast the remainder of the show every Thursday at 21:00 JST (GMT+9). The finale was aired on December 11, 2019, on TBS at 19:00 JST (GMT+9).

The final top eleven contestants debuted as the permanent boy group JO1.

== Concept and production ==
On April 11, 2019, it was announced that Lapone Entertainment, a management company co-founded by Yoshimoto Kogyo, CJ E&M, and MCIP Holdings, would produce a Japanese version of the South Korean idol survival show Produce 101 with the intention of debuting an internationally active, eleven-member boy group in 2020. The final group's members, name, and concept would be selected by the viewers, referred to as "National Producers" (Japanese: 国民プロデューサー, Hepburn: Kokumin Purodyūsā). The show had a budget of several billion yen and was one of the largest Japanese television productions.

Applications for the show were accepted from April 11 to May 31, 2019. All male Japanese residents aged 16 to 30 years old who were not tied to any talent agency at the time of application and had completed compulsory education were eligible to apply, regardless of previous experience or nationality. Successful applicants were called back for a first round of auditions, which were held on June 15 across seven cities in Japan: Sapporo, Sendai, Tokyo, Nagoya, Osaka, Fukuoka, and Okinawa. During the second screening, which took place from July 13 to July 15, the final 101 contestants were selected. In total, 6,000 people auditioned for the show.

In August, the chosen constestants were sent to a training camp in Paju, South Korea. Several episodes were shot there as well before the production returned to Japan.

In light of the Mnet vote manipulation investigation, the production committee stated in November 2019 that they were not affiliated with the Korean production team and had a separate voting system, with votes analyzed by a group of third-party lawyers. Following the departure of South Korean contestants Kim Hee-cheon, Kim Youn-dong, and Jeong Young-hoon, the production committee issued a statement explaining that the contestants were eligible for the show, as they were living in Japan at the time, and that their mandatory military service was not a reason why they left. In addition, they issued an official warning to viewers not to spread malicious rumors about the contestants on social media.

== Promotion and broadcast ==
On September 1, 2019, all 101 trainees were revealed at a press conference held at Osaki Bright Core Hall in Tokyo. Two days later, the music video for the show's theme song "Tsukame (It's Coming)" (Japanese: ツカメ～It's Coming～, lit. 'Seize It～It's Coming～') was released, with Ren Kawashiri serving as the center. The same day, profiles for all contestants were published on the official website.

The series premiered on September 25, 2019, on TBS, and a day later on GyaO!, where all twelve episodes were subsequently aired for free. The final episode was once again broadcast by TBS on December 11, 2019. Prior to the show's airing, two contestants had dropped out, leaving 99 trainees to compete on the show. Contestant Kenya Hata later dropped out of the series before the show was broadcast.

== Cast ==
The show was presented by Hideyuki Yabe and Takashi Okumura of the comedy duo Ninety-nine, who had previously hosted the Asayan talent competition series in 1999.

Vocal trainers

- Hidenori Sugai
- Sayaka Yasukura

Dance trainers

- A-non
- Warner

Rap trainer

- Cypress Ueno
- Bose

== Contestants ==
Color key

Final members of JO1
Contestant eliminated in the final episode
Contestant eliminated in the third elimination round
Contestant eliminated in the second elimination round
Contestant eliminated in the first elimination round
Contestant left the show

101 Contestants
Issei Mamehara (豆原 一成)	Ren Kawashiri (川尻 蓮)	Takumi Kawanishi (川西 拓実)	Shosei Ohira (大平 祥生)	Shion Tsurubo (鶴房 汐恩)
Ruki Shiroiwa (白岩 瑠姫)	Keigo Sato (佐藤 景瑚)	Syoya Kimata (木全 翔也)	Junki Kono (河野 純喜)	Sukai Kinjo (金城 碧海)
Sho Yonashiro (與那城 奨)	Yugo Miyajima (宮島 優心)	Shunya Osawa (大澤 駿弥)	Tomoaki Ando (安藤 誠明)	Kosuke Honda (本田 康祐)
Raira Sato (佐藤 來良)	Masahiko Imanishi (今西 正彦)	Minato Inoue (井上 港人)	Shion Tokonami (床波 志音)	Jun Uehara (上原 潤)
Jeong Young-hoon (チョン・ヨンフン)	Kim Yoon-dong (キム・ユンドン)	Fumiya Sano (佐野 文哉)	Koshin Komatsu (小松 倖真)	Ryuji Sato (佐藤 隆士)
Reito Kitagawa (北川 玲叶)	Kanta Migakida (磨田 寛大)	Tatsutoshi Miyazato (宮里 龍斗志)	Masanami Aoki (青木 聖波)	Sho Fukuchi (福地 正)
Naoki Ozawa (男澤 直樹)	Taiga Nakamoto (中本 大賀)	Kaito Okano (岡野 海斗)	Shuta Urano (浦野 秀太)	Kim Hee-cheon (キム・ヒチョン)
Hiroto Ikumi (井汲 大翔)	Tsubasa Takizawa (瀧澤 翼)	Hikaru Kitagawa (北川 暉)	Sora Nakazato (中里 空)	Kei Terashi (寺師 敬)
Ryo Mitsui (三井 瞭)	Lee Min-hyuk (イ・ミンヒョク)	Ryuta Hayashi (林 龍太)	Akihito Furuya (古屋 亮人)	Kyo Yamada (山田 恭)
Mao Sasaki (佐々木 真生)	Yu Ando (安藤 優)	Kento Kitaoka (北岡 謙人)	Masaki Ageda (安慶田 真樹)	Ryuto Iwasaki (岩崎 琉斗)
Ryono Kusachi (草地 稜之)	Ryunosuke Nakano (中野 龍之介)	Koki Nishio (西尾 航暉)	Takehiro Okada (岡田 武大)	Toi Nakabayashi (中林 登生)
Ryusei Watanabe (渡辺 龍星)	Hyuga Nakatani (中谷 日向)	Shuto Uchida (内田 脩斗)	Miyabi Suzuki (鈴木 雅)	Yushi Katagami (片上 勇士)
Kazuma Koga (古賀 一馬)	Ginsuke Nakagawa (中川 吟亮)	Katsunari Nakagawa (中川 勝就)	Rikuto Omizu (大水 陸渡)	Keiya Taguchi (田口 馨也)
Ryotaro Nishi (西 涼太郎)	Akira Takano (高野 慧)	Tomoya Nishino (西野 友也)	Ryusei Kurokawa (黒川 竜聖)	Hayato Isohata (五十畑 颯斗)
Takeru Gutierez (グチェレス・タケル)	Kazuki Nishiyama (西山 和貴)	Yuki Ishii (石井 祐輝)	Hikari Inayoshi (稲吉 ひかり)	Taichi Kihara (木原 汰一)
Yuya Tanaka (田中 雄也)	Eujin Aljama (アルジャマ 勇心)	Reiya Okawa (大川 澪哉)	Yoshiki Togo (東郷 良樹)	Tatsuki Yuki (結城 樹)
Kenta Yamamoto (山本 健太)	Gen Suzuki (鈴木 玄)	Masahiro Kanno (菅野 雅浩)	Shinjun Suzuki (鈴木 晨順)	Satoshi Yamada (山田 聡)
Kengo Hata (秦 健豪)	Taiki Watanabe (渡邊 大貴)	Naoki Nakanishi (中西 直樹)	Reo Hasegawa (長谷川 怜央)	Shinjiro Mori (森 慎二郎)
Shohei Yonehara (米原 尚平)	Masayoshi Ikemoto (池本 正義)	Yuki Komajaku (駒尺 雄樹)	Koki Watanabe (渡邊 公貴)	Haruka Matsukura (松倉 悠)
Kentaro Ishii (石井 健太郎)	Fumiya Kumazawa (熊澤 歩哉)	Shogo Koyama (小山 省吾)	Kenya Hata (畑 顕矢)	Kazuto Sato (佐藤 一翔)
Yuki Katayama (片山 湧貴)				

== Rankings ==
The top 11 contestants, which determined the members of the final group, were chosen through popularity online voting at Produce 101 Japan GyaO!'s homepage and audience's live voting. The results were shown at the end of each episode.

For the first and second voting period, viewers were allowed to select 11 trainees per vote. During the third round, the system changed to 2 trainees per vote and added votes from Softbank Line Friend. For the final round, the system changed to one trainee per vote and added live online votes.

New Top 11 (Note: Indicates contestants who had never placed in the Top 11 in any prior elimination rounds or ranking announcements.)
Comeback to Top 11

List of Top 11 contestants
#	Episode 1	Episode 2	Episode 3	Episode 5	Episode 6	Episode 8	Episode 9	Episode 11	Episode 12
1	Ren Kawashiri	Issei Mamehara (▲2)	Issei Mamehara	Ren Kawashiri (▲1)	Takumi Kawanishi (▲2)	Takumi Kawanishi	Issei Mamehara (▲4)	Ren Kawashiri (▲1)	Issei Mamehara (▲1)
2	Takumi Kawanishi	Ren Kawashiri (▼1)	Ren Kawashiri	Issei Mamehara (▼1)	Ren Kawashiri (▼1)	Ren Kawashiri	Ren Kawashiri	Issei Mamehara (▼1)	Ren Kawashiri (▼1)
3	Issei Mamehara	Takumi Kawanishi (▼1)	Takumi Kawanishi	Takumi Kawanishi	Shion Tsurubo (▲2)	Shion Tsurubo	Shion Tsurubo	Shion Tsurubo	Takumi Kawanishi (▲3)
4	Tomoaki Ando	Tomoaki Ando	Kim Hee-cheon (▲2)	Kim Hee-cheon	Issei Mamehara (▼2)	Issei Mamehara	Ruki Shiroiwa (▲9)	Ruki Shiroiwa	Shosei Ohira (▲7)
5	Masahiko Imanishi	Shion Tsurubo (▲2)	Shion Tsurubo	Shion Tsurubo	Kim Yoon-dong (▲1)	Kim Hee-cheon (▲1)	Jun Uehara (▲7)	Jeong Young-hoon (▲1) (Note: Kim Youn-dong, and Jeong Young-hoon also announced they were leaving the show after announced ranking in episode 11.)	Shion Tsurubo (▼2)
6	Jun Uehara	Kim Hee-cheon (▲4)	Kim Yoon-dong (▲7)	Kim Yoon-dong	Kim Hee-cheon (▼2)	Kim Yoon-dong (▼1)	Jeong Young-hoon (▲1)	Takumi Kawanishi (▲6)	Ruki Shiroiwa (▼2)
7	Shion Tsurubo	Jun Uehara (▼1)	Tomoaki Ando (▼3)	Shosei Ohira (▲1)	Jeong Young-hoon (▲1)	Jeong Young-hoon	Tomoaki Ando (▲3)	Tomoaki Ando	Keigo Sato (▲8)
8	Lee Min-hyuk	Masahiko Imanishi (▼3)	Shosei Ohira (▲1)	Jeong Young-hoon (▲1)	Shunya Osawa (▲1)	Shunya Osawa	Sho Yonashiro (▲9)	Jun Uehara (▼3)	Syoya Kimata (▲2)
9	Jeong Young-hoon	Shosei Ohira (▲6)	Jeong Young-hoon (▲2)	Shunya Osawa (▲2)	Shosei Ohira (▼2)	Junki Kono (▲1)	Syoya Kimata (▲5)	Kim Yoon-dong (▲1)	Junki Kono (▲4)
10	Kim Hee-cheon	Lee Min-hyuk (▼2)	Yugo Miyajima (▲5)	Yugo Miyajima	Junki Kono (▲5)	Tomoaki Ando (▲1)	Kim Yoon-dong (▼4)	Syoya Kimata (▼1)	Sukai Kinjo (▲6)
11	Shunya Osawa	Jeong Young-hoon (▼2)	Shunya Osawa (▲1)	Tomoaki Ando (▼4)	Tomoaki Ando	Shosei Ohira (▼2)	Junki Kono (▼2)	Shosei Ohira (▲2)	Sho Yonashiro (▲1)

=== First voting period ===
The first voting period took place between September 26 at 12 am and October 18 at 5:00 am (JST). The total number of votes accumulated was 33,847,705.

#	Episode 1 (Online votes)	Episode 2 (Online votes)	Episode 3 (Online votes)	Episode 4 (Live votes)		Episode 5 (Total votes)	
#	Episode 1 (Online votes)	Episode 2 (Online votes)	Episode 3 (Online votes)	Name	Votes	Name	Votes
1	Ren Kawashiri	Issei Mamehara	Issei Mamehara	Kosuke Honda	14,230	Ren Kawashiri	1,883,178
2	Takumi Kawanishi	Ren Kawashiri	Ren Kawashiri	Naoki Ozawa	14,224	Issei Mamehara	1,848,191
3	Issei Mamehara	Takumi Kawanishi	Takumi Kawanishi	Ryo Mitsui	13,185	Takumi Kawanishi	1,771,861
4	Tomoaki Ando	Tomoaki Ando	Kim Hee-cheon	Sho Yonashiro	4,151	Kim Hee-cheon	1,411,741
5	Masahiko Imanishi	Shion Tsurubo	Shion Tsurubo	Masahiko Imanishi	4,120	Shion Tsurubo	1,238,146
6	Jun Uehara	Kim Hee-cheon	Kim Yoon-dong	Shion Tokonami	3,217	Kim Yoon-dong	1,145,844
7	Shion Tsurubo	Jun Uehara	Tomoaki Ando	Sho Fukuchi	3,178	Shosei Ohira	1,053,408
8	Lee Min-hyuk	Masahiko Imanishi	Shosei Ohira	Tsubasa Takizawa	3,167	Jeong Young-hoon	905,412
9	Jeong Young-hoon	Shosei Ohira	Jeong Young-hoon	Keigo Sato	3,141	Shunya Osawa	854,843
10	Kim Hee-cheon	Lee Min-hyuk	Yugo Miyajima	Jun Uehara	1,175	Yugo Miyajima	835,565
11	Shunya Osawa	Jeong Young-hoon	Shunya Osawa	Ren Kawashiri	1,138	Tomoaki Ando	798,477

Notes
- On Episode 4, an additional 1,000 points were given to the individual of the winning teams and an additional 3,000 points were given to the 1st place in song from 2 group while 10,000 points were given to the winner of each category (vocal position, rap position and dance position).
- The ranking for Episode 5 was the result of combining online votes and live votes from the previous episode.

=== Second voting period ===
The second voting period took place between October 24 at 11:30 pm and November 8 at 5:00 am (JST). The total number of votes accumulated was 18,945,494.

#	Episode 6 (Online votes)	Episode 7 (Live votes)		Episode 8 (Total votes)	
#	Episode 6 (Online votes)	Name	Votes	Name	Votes
1	Takumi Kawanishi	Takumi Kawanishi	170,419	Takumi Kawanishi	1,149,244
2	Ren Kawashiri	Ren Kawashiri	100,395	Ren Kawashiri	1,074,606
3	Shion Tsurubo	Kim Hee-cheon	100,376	Shion Tsurubo	996,794
4	Issei Mamehara	Shuta Urano	100,372	Issei Mamehara	962,252
5	Kim Yoon-dong	Shunya Osawa	100,371	Kim Hee-cheon	823,022
6	Kim Hee-cheon	Jun Uehara	100,300	Kim Yoon-dong	807,141
7	Jeong Young-hoon	Issei Mamehara	20,407	Jeong Young-hoon	748,508
8	Shunya Osawa	Sho Yonashiro	20,407	Shunya Osawa	705,067
9	Shosei Ohira	Shion Tokonami	20,402	Junki Kono	661,099
10	Junki Kono	Syoya Kimata	20,367	Tomoaki Ando	654,176
11	Tomoaki Ando	Kosuke Honda	20,360	Shosei Ohira	543,768

Notes
- On Episode 7, The individual winner of each group got a 20,000 point bonus, the overall individual winner got a 50,000 point bonus, and the overall group winners got a 100,000 point bonus.
- The ranking for Episode 8 was the result of combining online votes and live votes from the previous episode.

=== Third voting period ===
The third voting period will take place between November 14 at 11:30 pm and November 29 at 5:00 am (JST). The total number of votes accumulated was 8,356,702.

#	Episode 9 (Online votes)	Episode 10 (Live votes)		Episode 11 (Total votes)	
#	Episode 9 (Online votes)	Name	Votes	Name	Votes
1	Issei Mamehara	Minato Inoue	100,046	Ren Kawashiri	516,171
2	Ren Kawashiri	Keigo Sato	20,041	Issei Mamehara	505,823
3	Shion Tsurubo	Syoya Kimata	20,034	Shion Tsurubo	460,657
4	Ruki Shiroiwa	Jun Uehara	20,031	Ruki Shiroiwa	448,795
5	Jun Uehara	Tatsutoshi Miyazato	20,012	Jeong Young-hoon	383,463
6	Jeong Young-hoon	Kaito Okano	20,006	Takumi Kawanishi	381,845
7	Tomoaki Ando	Masanami Aoki	20,004	Tomoaki Ando	355,660
8	Sho Yonashiro	Ruki Shiroiwa	70	Jun Uehara	354,058
9	Syoya Kimata	Shion Tsurubo	35	Kim Yoon-dong	347,621
10	Kim Yoon-dong	Shosei Ohira	30	Syoya Kimata	339,052
11	Junki Kono	Shion Tokonami	24	Shosei Ohira	336,162

Notes
- On Episode 10, an additional 20,000 points were given to each member of the winning group except for the one with the most votes, who received an additional 100,000 points instead.
- The ranking for Episode 11 was the result of combining online votes and live votes from the previous episode.

=== Result ===
The finale online voting period took place between December 5 at 11:00 pm and December 11 at 5:00 am (JST) and The finale was held on December 11 at 7:00 pm (JST), and open online voting period was broadcast live. The total number of votes accumulated was 3,242,751. Ninety-nine announced the unit boy group name, JO1.

#	Episode 12 (Total votes)			
#	Name	Votes	Prefecture	Audition Name
1	Issei Mamehara	261,583	Okayama	Issei Mamehara
2	Ren Kawashiri	256,527	Fukuoka	UN Backers
3	Takumi Kawanishi	252,885	Hyogo	KSix
4	Shosei Ohira	220,594	Kyoto	UN Backers
5	Shion Tsurubo	204,045	Shiga	Sion
6	Ruki Shiroiwa	194,919	Tokyo	Hangyaku no Prince
7	Keigo Sato	186,309	Aichi	High-Steps
8	Syoya Kimata	171,205	Aichi	Shachihoko Friends
9	Junki Kono	159,057	Nara	Six Packs
10	Sukai Kinjo	157,373	Osaka	Team Sky
11	Sho Yonashiro	140,003	Okinawa	Six Packs

== Discography ==
=== Extended plays ===
Title	Details	Peak chart positions		Sales
Title	Details	JPN Hot	JPN Dig	Sales
35 Boys 5 Concepts	Released: November 29, 2019; Label: Lapone Entertainment; Formats: Digital download	3	2	JPN: 13,546
Produce 101 Japan — Final	Released: December 12, 2019; Label: Lapone Entertainment; Formats: Digital download	32	—	—N/a

=== Singles ===
Title	Year	Peak positions		Sales	Album
Title	Year	JPN Hot 100	JPN Dig	Sales	Album
"Tsukame (It's Coming)"	2019	42	—	—N/a	Non-album single
"KungChiKiTa"	2019	91	—	—N/a	35 Boys 5 Concepts
"Domino"	2019	67	—	—N/a	35 Boys 5 Concepts
"Happy Merry Christmas"	2019	84	—	—N/a	35 Boys 5 Concepts
"Black Out"	2019	94	—	—N/a	35 Boys 5 Concepts
"Yancha Boy Yancha Girl"	2019	77	—	—N/a	35 Boys 5 Concepts
"GrandMaster"	2019	25	6	JPN: 10,454	Produce 101 Japan — Final
"Young"	2019	20	5	JPN: 10,759	Produce 101 Japan — Final
"Sayonara Seishun" (Produce 101 Japan ver.)	2019	47	11	JPN: 7,483	Produce 101 Japan — Final
"—" denotes releases that did not chart or were not released in that territory.

== Reception ==
=== Ratings on TBS ===
Title	Original broadcast date	Timeslot (JST)	Average audience share (Kanto)
Premiere	September 26, 2019	0:01 - 1:00 am	2.6%
Live Final	December 11, 2019	7:00 - 9:00 pm	3.4%

== Post-Competition ==
- JO1 released their debut single "Protostar" on March 4, 2020.
  - Shion Tsurubo (5th) left the group on December 31, 2025 after a six-month hiatus due to suspicion of online gambling.
  - Shosei Ohira (4th) left the group on May 31, 2026 after an indefinite hiatus due to rule violations.
Other contestants, other activities
- Some trainees formed/joined with groups:
  - Yugo Miyajima (12th), Shunya Osawa (13th), Tomoaki Ando (14th), Jun Uehara (20th), Jeong Young-hoon (21st), Kim Yoon-dong (22nd), and Kim Hee-cheon (35th) formed a boy group called Orbit under agency Dream Passport. They released their debut album 00 on November 11.
  - Kosuke Honda (15th), Fumiya Sano (23rd), Shuta Urano (34th), Katsunari Nakagawa (63rd) signed with Yoshimoto Kogyo and formed a boy group called OWV. They released the music video for their first single "Uba Uba" on August 31.
  - Raira Sato (16th), Minato Inoue (18th), Koshin Komatsu (24th), Hikaru Kitagawa (38th) joined a boys group called Bugvel and will release their first song "Warning" under agency Dream Passport.
  - Migakida Kanta (27th), Kento Kitaoka (48th) and Takeru Gutierez (71st) joined a group called BXW under agency Churros. Reito Kitagawa (26th) and Hiroto Ikumi (36th) who also had joined the group subsequently left due to difference in the direction of activities. The group released their debut song "Takai Yume ni" on October 22, 2020.
  - Tatsutoshi Miyazato (28th), Sho Fukuchi (30th), Taiga Nakamoto (32nd), Tsubasa Takizawa (37th), Kyo Yamada (45th), Ryono Kusachi (51st), Toi Nakabayashi (55th), Hyuga Nakatani (57th), Fumiya Kumazawa (97th) signed with Showtitle, a subsidiary company of Yoshimoto Kogyo. The nine ex-trainees formed a performance unit called Enjin that will also incorporate singing, dancing, and stage play. The group had their major debut in December under label Nonagon Records, from Universal Sigma. Their debut stage titled Nonagon―Hajimari no Oto was held in Tokyo on December 4.
  - Masanami Aoki (29th), Akihito Furuya (44th), Koki Nishio (53rd), Takehiro Okada (54th), and Akira Takano (67th) formed a unit named NVRLND.
  - Kaito Okano (33rd), Yu Ando (47th), Rikuto Omizu (64th), Hikari Inayoshi (74h), and Tatsuki Yuki (80th) formed a "KJ-Hop" group called Boom Trigger under World Entertainment. They released their debut single "Shaking/Party Must Go On" on August 13.
- Some trainees signed with agencies:
  - Masahiko Imanishi (17th) signed with agency Dream Passport and adapted a stage name Hico. He then released his 1st digital single "Strawberry" (feat.TOMO) on December 25.
  - Ryuji Sato (25th), Hiroto Ikumi (36th), and Keiya Taguchi (65th) signed with RBW Japan and joined their trainee program RBW JBOYZ. Ryuji Sato then leave the company on December 28.
  - Kengo Hata (86th) signed with Ito Company. He then starred in a stage play "Egu Onna" on November 13-15th.
  - Satoshi Yamada (85th) signed with YKA Entertainment.
  - Sato Ryuji (25th) signed with Churros Agency. He then released his 1st digital single "PLAYGROUND" (feat. BXW) on 8 September 2022.
- Some trainees debuted as actors:
  - Naoki Ozawa (29th) starred in a stage play K.B.S Project Super Youth Chorus Comedy "SING!"-2020.
- Some trainees released their single:
  - Lee Min-Hyuk (42th) released his 1st digital single "Pray" on August 1 under a stage name Hyuk.
  - Masaki Ageda (49th) released his 1st digital single "u" on October 26.
  - Hayato Isohata (70th) released his 1st digital single "Endless Hope" on December 25.
- Some trainees participated in other survival shows:
  - Hiroto Ikumi (36th) and Keiya Taguchi (65th) joined Produce Camp 2021. Keiya ranked 78th and Hiroto ranked 15th.
  - Hiroto Ikumi (36th) participated in Boys Planet. He was eliminated in the eleventh episode after ranking 21st.
  - Ryo Mitsui (41st), Ryuta Hayashi (43rd), Gen Suzuki (82nd) joined G-Egg. Mitsui and Hayashi won the competition and will debut in the boys group NIK.
  - Koshin Komatsu (24th) and Hikari Inayoshi (74th) will participate on Chuang Asia: Season 2. Hikari was eliminated in the sixth episode after ranking 40th, and Koshin was eliminated in the final episode after ranking 12th.
