= List of Oricon number-one singles of 2025 =

The following is a list of Oricon number-one singles of 2025.

== Chart history ==
List of Oricon number-one singles of 2025
Issue date	Song	Artist(s)	Sales	Ref.
January 6	"Sparkling Moon" / "Good Luck My Future"	Gang Parade	30,021	
January 13	"Kokuhaku Shinpakusu"	SKE48	6,904	
January 20	"Curtain Call"	Kis-My-Ft2	117,090	
January 27	"Chiheisen o Miteiru ka?"	STU48	110,341	
February 3	"Aventure Nakameguro"	Matsuri	51,481	
February 10	"Sotsugyō Shashin Dake ga Shitteru"	Hinatazaka46	428,133	
February 17	"Spacecraft" / "Sailing"	Be:First	100,509	
February 24	"Phone Number"	Takanori Iwata	44,363	
March 3	"Udagawa Generation"	Sakurazaka46	480,033	
March 10	"Doki It"	Naniwa Danshi	324,660	
March 17	"Say I Do" / "Tokyo Crazy Night"	Travis Japan	143,360	
March 24	"Heart"	King & Prince	317,467	
March 31	"Barrier"	SixTones	363,211	
April 7	"Navel Orange"	Nogizaka46	483,817	
April 14	"Masaka no Confession"	AKB48	371,796	
April 21	"Chū Strike"	NMB48	175,442	
April 28	"Muse"	Me:I	198,730	
May 5	"Go in Blind"	&Team	415,166	
May 12	"Mobunoderera" / "Kamisama no Iutori!"	≠Me	182,486	
May 19	"West Side Soul!" / "Big Love Song"	West.	223,811	
May 26	"Kawaiitte Magic"	Fruits Zipper	227,213	
June 2	"Love Yourself!"	Hinatazaka46	412,990	
June 9	"Encore"	Hey! Say! JUMP	204,965	
June 16	"Boyz"	SixTones	356,596	
June 23	"Plazma" / "Bow and Arrow"	Kenshi Yonezu	281,121	
June 30	"Chameleon"	Ae! Group	455,336	
July 7	"Make or Break"	Sakurazaka46	474,781	
July 14	"Nice to See You Again"	TWS	150,054	
July 21	"Kakurenbo"	Plave	220,389	
July 28	"Maji Majinai"	Panda Dragon	77,610	
August 4	"Serious"	Snow Man	882,605	
August 11	"Same Numbers"	Nogizaka46	595,302	
August 18	"What We Got (Kiseki wa Kimi to)" / "I Know"	King & Prince	320,336	
August 25	"Oh My Pumpkin!"	AKB48	351,337	
September 1	Boylife ("Count to Love")	BoyNextDoor	346,060	
September 8	"Kizutsuku Koto ga Seishun da"	STU48	126,374	
September 15	"Asymmetry" / "Black Nightmare"	Naniwa Danshi	348,476	
September 22	"Stargaze"	SixTones	329,717	
September 29	"Onegai Bach!"	Hinatazaka46	451,443	
October 6	"Nine Lives"	Bullet Train	287,172	
October 13	"Black Crown"	OWV	41,629	
October 20	"Love Song ni Osowareru"	=Love	329,685	
October 27	"Hachamecha Wacha Life!" / "Jam"	Fruits Zipper	316,932	
November 3	"Handz in My Pocket"	JO1	505,121	
November 10	"Unhappy Birthday Kōbun"	Sakurazaka46	525,378	
November 17	"Shintōya"	CNBLUE	13,984	
November 24	"Steal the Show" / "Recipe"	Timelesz	512,609	
December 1	The Winter Magic ("Present")	INI	879,759	
December 8	"Biryani"	Nogizaka46	554,180	
December 15	"Teka Happy no Happy!" / "Watashi no Lamentazione"	Morning Musume	75,501	
December 22	"Haitateki Fighter"	≠Me	303,458	
December 29	"Winter Song Bōeitai"	Panda Dragon	121,591	

== See also ==
- List of Oricon number-one albums of 2025
