= 1st Is:sue =

2024 single album by Is:sue

- Digital and standard version cover

Single album by Is:sue
- Released: June 19, 2024
- Studio: WakeOne Studio
- Genre: J-pop; trap; jersey club
- Length: 3:14
- Language: Japanese; English
- Label: Lapone Girls; Universal Sigma
- Producer: Park Woo Sang (LOGOS); Choi Shin Hwa (exec.)

Is:sue chronology
1st Is:sue (2024)	Welcome Strangers: 2nd Is:sue (2024)

Singles from 1st Is:sue
- 1. "Connect" Released: May 17, 2024

1st Is:sue is the first single album by Japanese girl group Is:sue. It was released on June 19, 2024, by Lapone Girls and Universal Sigma.

== Background and release ==
On April 25, 2024, it was announced that the four finalists from Produce 101 Japan The Girls, a reality competition show, had signed a contract with Lapone Entertainment under its newly established sub-label Lapone Girls, and formed the new girl group Is:sue. It was concurrently revealed that the group would make its official debut on June 19, 2024, with the release of their first single album, 1st Is:sue.

On May 17, the group released the lead single from 1st Is:sue, "Connect".

== Commercial performance ==
1st Is:sue reached number one on the Oricon weekly chart. Additionally, the lead track "Connect" peaked at number two on the Billboard Japan Hot 100.

== Track listing ==
Track listing for 1st Is:sue
No.	Title	Lyrics	Music	Arrangement	Length
1.	"Connect"	LOGOS; Kurtz; BORAN	Masami Kakimura; Rose Blueming; Hiyori Nara	LOGOS; Kurtz	3:14
2.	"Static"	Blueming; Nara; Anna Kusakawa	LOGOS; Kurtz; Livy	LOGOZ; Kurtz	3:11
Total length:					6:25

== Charts ==
=== Weekly charts ===
Weekly chart performance for 1st Is:sue
Chart (2023)	Peak position
Japan (Oricon)	1
Japan Combined Singles (Oricon)	1
Japan Top Singles Sales (Billboard Japan)	1

=== Monthly charts ===
Monthly chart performance for 1st Is:sue
Chart (2024)	Peak position
Japan (Oricon)	5

=== Year-end charts ===
Year-end chart performance for 1st Is:sue
Chart (2024)	Position
Japan (Oricon)	61
Japan Top Singles Sales (Billboard Japan)	67

== Certifications and sales ==
Certifications for "1st Is:sue"
Region	Certification	Certified units/sales
Japan (RIAJ)	Gold	100,000^{^}
^{^} Shipments figures based on certification alone.

== Release history ==
Release history for 1st Is:sue
Region	Date	Format	Label	Ref.
Various	June 18, 2024	Digital download; streaming	Lapone Girls; Universal Sigma	
Japan	June 19, 2024	CD	Lapone Girls; Universal Sigma	
