= Masuri =

Masuri may refer to:

- Masuri, Ghaziabad, a town in Uttar Pradesh, India
- Mussoorie, a hill station in the Indian state of Uttarakhand
- Magic Kid Masuri, a 2002 South Korean television series
- Sona Masuri, a medium-grain rice grown in India

== See also ==
- Masoori
- Matsuri (disambiguation)
