= Candy Caries =

Japanese anime television series

- 2021 promotional visual

キャンディーカリエス (Kyandīkariesu)
- Genre: Comedy (Slapstick), Fantasy
- Created by: Tomoki Misato
- Original net animation
- Directed by: Tomoki Misato
- Music by: Yutaka Yamada
- Studio: Wit Studio
- Released: March 24, 2021
- Runtime: 1 minute 8 seconds
- Episodes: 1
- Anime television series
- Directed by: Tomoki Misato
- Music by: Keigo Hoashi
- Studio: Toruku from Wit Studio
- Licensed by: Amazon Prime Video (streaming); SA/SEA: Muse Communication
- Original network: TBS
- Original run: April 15, 2026 – September 24, 2026
- Episodes: 24
- icon

Candy Caries (キャンディーカリエス, Kyandīkariesu) is a Japanese stop-motion television anime series created and directed by Tomoki Misato and produced by Toruku, Wit Studio's stop-motion animation label. The series is based on the 2021 promotional stop-motion short of the same name. The television adaptation premiered on TBS in April 2026.

The series follows Ame, a young girl obsessed with sweets, and Caries, a mischievous tooth decay character who lives inside her mouth and views her as a mother figure. Combining colorful plastic-board stop-motion animation with surreal slapstick comedy, the series depicts their unusual relationship as Caries repeatedly causes chaos both inside and outside Ame's mouth.

== Plot ==
Ame is an energetic child who loves eating sweets. Unknown to everyone around her, her mouth is home to Caries, a living cavity who freely remodels Ame's teeth into furniture, manipulates her surroundings, and frequently involves her in bizarre adventures. Although Caries affectionately refers to Ame as "Mama", Ame insists that she is simply an ordinary child and constantly finds herself cleaning up the consequences of Caries' reckless behaviour.

Each episode presents a self-contained story set within a miniature world where everyday dental hygiene, childhood imagination, and surreal fantasy intersect through stop-motion animation.

== Characters ==
Ame (アメ)
Voiced by: Miyuki Satō
Caries (カリエス)
Voiced by: Hana Takeda
Mad Dentist (狂人歯医者)
Voiced by: Jin Katagiri
Harold (ハロルド)
Voiced by: Ryōgo Matsumaru
Ame's mother (アメ母)
Voiced by: Kayo Noro
Beef (ビーフ)
Voiced by: Masahito Yabe
Mikan (ミカン)
Voiced by: Rie Hikisaka
Shark (サメ)
Voiced by: Ayaka Saitō

== Development ==
Candy Caries originated as an original stop-motion animation concept created by director Tomoki Misato. The project was first introduced in March 2021 as a short promotional animation produced by Wit Studio shortly after the establishment of its stop-motion animation division, Toruku. The short depicted the relationship between a young girl and a sentient cavity living inside her mouth and was released on YouTube as part of Toruku's early promotional activities.

According to Misato, the original animation experimented with a visual style combining plastic board and acrylic materials. The resulting aesthetic was designed to appear simultaneously flat like an illustration and thick like a three-dimensional object.

By January 2026, the 2021 promotional short had accumulated approximately 1.7 million views on YouTube. A television anime adaptation was announced the same month.

== Media ==
The 2021 promotional short was directed by Tomoki Misato, with Kenta Yamada serving as animation producer, Masaaki Tanaka handling 2D animation, and Yutaka Yamada composing the music, with production by Wit Studio. For the 2026 television anime adaptation, Misato returned as director with Kenshiro Morii as assistant director. Chiaki Nishinaka handled the series composition and scripts, Akari Saitō served as editor, Yasunori Ebina served as sound director, and Keigo Hoashi composed the music, while Kenta Yamada returned as animation producer. Animation production was carried out by Toruku from Wit Studio, while the series itself was produced by Tooth Fairies. The theme song for the television series is "Telepathy", performed by the Japanese girl group IS:SUE. The series premiered on TBS's Yoru no Brunch program on April 15, 2026, and is distributed internationally on Amazon Prime Video. Muse Communication licensed the series for South Asia and Southeast Asia, streaming it on their Muse Asia and Muse Wonderland YouTube channels. Outside Asia, the series is also streamed on the Candy Caries YouTube channel with English, Latin American Spanish, European Spanish, and Brazilian Portuguese subtitles.

=== Episodes ===
No.	Title	Original release date
1	"Beware the Mad Dentist"; Transliteration: "Kyōjin haisha ni kiwotsukero" (Japanese: 狂人歯医者に気をつけろ)	April 15, 2026
2	"Ame's Cavity"; Transliteration: "Mushiba no ame-chan" (Japanese: 虫歯のアメちゃん)	April 22, 2026
3	"TV Raising Project"; Transliteration: "Terebi ikusei keikaku" (Japanese: テレビ育成計画)	April 29, 2026
4	"Is the White Powder Dangerous?"; Transliteration: "Shiroi kona wa kiken?" (Japanese: 白い粉はキケン？)	May 6, 2026
5	"Pushed Around by Him"; Transliteration: "Kare ni furimawasa rete" (Japanese: 彼に振りまわされて)	May 13, 2026
6	"Catch the Tooth Thief"; Transliteration: "Ha dorobō o tsukamaero" (Japanese: 歯ドロボウをつかまえろ)	May 20, 2026
7	"The Dentist Isn't Scary"; Transliteration: "Haisha wa kowakunai" (Japanese: 歯医者はこわくない)	May 27, 2026
8	"The Tantrum Rampage"; Transliteration: "Iyaiya dai bōsō" (Japanese: イヤイヤ大暴走)	June 3, 2026
9	"The Tooth Fairy"; Transliteration: "Ha no yōsei" (Japanese: 歯の妖精)	June 10, 2026
10	"Caries Moves Out"; Transliteration: "Kariesu no o hikkoshi" (Japanese: カリエスのお引越し)	June 17, 2026
11	"Curses Make Money"; Transliteration: "Noroi wa mōkaru" (Japanese: 呪いはもうかる)	June 24, 2026
12	"Operation: Christmas"; Transliteration: "Kurisumasu dai sakusen" (Japanese: クリスマス大作戦)	July 1, 2026
13	"Alien Abduction"; Transliteration: "Eirian abudakushon" (Japanese: エイリアン・アブダクション)	July 8, 2026
14	"In Place of Mom"; Transliteration: "Mama no kawari ni" (Japanese: ママのかわりに)	July 15, 2026
15	"Parenting Isn't Easy"; Transliteration: "Kosodate wa raku janai" (Japanese: 子育ては楽じゃない)	July 22, 2026
16	"UMA Exists!"; Transliteration: "UMA haita!" (Japanese: UMAはいた！)	July 29, 2026
17	"Guardian Giga-Teeth"; Transliteration: "Mori no gigatīsu" (Japanese: 守りのギガティース)	August 5, 2026
18	"No Entry Allowed"; Transliteration: "Nyūten wa o kotowari" (Japanese: 入店はおことわり)	August 12, 2026
19	"Caries' Body Journey"; Transliteration: "Kariesu bodi jānī" (Japanese: カリエス・ボディ・ジャーニー)	August 19, 2026
20	"Full of Cavities"; Transliteration: "Mushiba-darake" (Japanese: 虫歯だらけ)	August 26, 2026
21	"Caries Cooking"; Transliteration: "Mushiba kukkingu" (Japanese: 虫歯クッキング)	September 2, 2026
22	"Wacky Kart Race"; Transliteration: "Hachamecha kātorēsu" (Japanese: ハチャメチャ・カートレース)	September 9, 2026
23	"Goodbye Caries: Part 1"; Transliteration: "Sayōnara, mushiba: Pāto 1" (Japanese: さようなら、虫歯：パート1)	September 16, 2026
24	"Goodbye Caries: Part 2"; Transliteration: "Sayōnara, mushiba: Pāto 2" (Japanese: さようなら、虫歯：パート2)	September 24, 2026
