= The Night Park E.P. =

The Night Park E.P

EP by Gang Parade
- Released: November 15, 2023
- Genre: J-pop
- Length: 26:28
- Language: Japanese
- Label: WACK; Fueled By Mentaiko

Gang Parade chronology
Our Parade (2023)	The Night Park E.P (2023)	Gang Rise (2025)

Singles from The Night Park E.P.
- 1. "Somnium" Released: August 27, 2023

The Night Park E.P. is the first extended play from Japanese girl group Gang Parade. It was released on November 15, 2023, by Fueled By Mentaiko. The EP consists of eight tracks. The song "Träumerei" was used as the opening theme song for television drama My Personal Weatherman.

== Track listing ==
No.	Title	Lyrics	Music	Length
1.	"Träumerei"	Ca Non	Kotonohouse	3:35
2.	"Sweet Dreams"	Kila May	Kotonohouse	4:33
3.	"Somnium" (ソムニウム)	Yuka Terashima	Aiobahn	3:03
4.	"†Endless Nightmare Story†"	Usagi Tsukino	Misumi	2:51
5.	"Gangsta Vibes"	Gang Parade	Gang Parade, Kotonohouse	3:13
6.	"Aishite" (アイシテ)	Potential	Aiobahn	2:43
7.	"Namida wa Kaze ni, Omoi wa Uta ni" (涙は風に、思いは歌に)	Misumi	Misumi	3:29
8.	"Mirage" (ミラージュ – solo by Yua Yumeno)	Yua Yumeno	Takemasa Ono	2:57
Total length:				26:28

== Charts ==
Chart	Peak position
Japanese Albums (Oricon)	4
Japanese Albums (Billboard)	3
