= Mastery (disambiguation) =

Mastery is a high level of a skill.

Mastery may also refer to:

- Mastery (book), a book by Robert Greene
- Mastery (horse), a British racehorse

== See also ==
- Mastery learning
- Masturi (disambiguation)
