= Me & Roboco =

Japanese manga series

- First tankōbon volume cover, an homage to the first volume of Doraemon

僕とロボコ (Boku to Roboko)
- Genre: Fantasy comedy
- Manga
- Written by: Shuhei Miyazaki
- Published by: Shueisha
- English publisher: NA: Viz Media
- Imprint: Jump Comics
- Magazine: Weekly Shōnen Jump
- Original run: July 6, 2020 – present
- Volumes: 28
- Anime television series
- Directed by: Akitaro Daichi
- Written by: Sayuri Ooba
- Studio: Gallop
- Licensed by: Crunchyroll; SA / SEA: Medialink
- Original network: TXN (TV Tokyo)
- Original run: December 5, 2022 – June 19, 2023
- Episodes: 28
- Anime film
- Directed by: Akitaro Daichi
- Studio: Gallop
- Licensed by: Crunchyroll
- Released: April 18, 2025
- Runtime: 64 minutes
- icon

Me & Roboco (Japanese: 僕とロボコ, Hepburn: Boku to Roboko) is a Japanese manga series written and illustrated by Shuhei Miyazaki. It has been serialized in Shueisha's Weekly Shōnen Jump since July 2020, with its chapters collected in 28 tankōbon volumes as of October 2026. The series is published digitally in English language by Viz Media. A 28-episode anime television series adaptation produced by Gallop was broadcast on TV Tokyo from December 2022 to June 2023. An anime film adaptation premiered in April 2025.

== Plot ==
Set in a future where every household owns maid robots known as OrderMaids, average grade-schooler Bondo Taira dreams of having his very own robot because his friends, Gachi Gorilla and Motsuo Kaneo, always brag about Kaneo's OrderMaid, Meico. With some convincing, Bondo manages to make his mom agree and get them one, but what he receives is an unable-to-compute maid named Roboco, the most powerful clumsy maid ever created. With Roboco's arrival, Bondo's life starts to get a whole lot weirder.

== Characters ==
Roboco (ロボコ, Roboko)
Voiced by: Shun Matsuo, Inori Minase ("weak-kneed" Roboco), Mayumi Tanaka (Roboco from a "straightforward battle world line"), Shigeru Chiba (Roboco from a "classic sci-fi action worldline"), Sumire Uesaka (Roboco from a "romantic comedy worldline"), Masako Nozawa (Roboco from a "Showa-era gag manga worldline")
A self proclaimed 17-year-old order maid who serves Bondo. She has a heavyset body structure and masculine legs. When she has low battery, her body changes to a slim petite girl's.
Bondo Taira (平 凡人, Taira Bondo)
Voiced by: Minami Tsuda
Bondo is a regular 10-year-old boy. He always deals with Roboco's antics, but he tolerates them and he actually feels lonely when she is not around. He is obsessed with Weekly Shōnen Jump.
Gorilla Gachi (我知 ゴリラ, Gachi Gorira)
Voiced by: Ryōtarō Okiayu
Gorilla Gachi is one of Bondo's best friends and older brother to his sister Ruri. Gorilla Gachi does not hesitate to help his friends when they are in trouble. When he is not playing with his friends, he is helping his mom to look out for his siblings.
Motsuo Kaneo (金尾 モツオ, Kaneo Motsuo)
Voiced by: Shunsuke Takeuchi
Motsuo is Bondo's other best friend who also owns an order maid named Meico. He is the richest and smartest among his friends. His father wanted to enroll him in an overseas elementary school, but he refused. Instead, he made a deal with his dad to become the first in every national mock exam in order to stay with his friends until he graduates. His name is a pun on the phrase "to have money" (金を持つ, kane o motsu).
Madoka (円)
Voiced by: M.A.O
Madoka is 11-year-old girl who also works as part time idol. Bondo has a crush on her and is always trying hard to impress her. Madoka has a unique mood swing: she turns masculine whenever she is in serious mode.
Meiko (メイコ)
Voiced by: Sae Hiratsuka
Bondo's Mom (ボンドのママ, Bondo no Mama)
Voiced by: Kotono Mitsuishi
Bondo's mother. She is often seen carrying a kitchen knife around, even when she does not need it.
Millie (ミリー, Mirī)
Voiced by: Kaori Nazuka

== Media ==
=== Manga ===
Written and illustrated by Shuhei Miyazaki, Me & Roboco started in Shueisha's shōnen manga magazine Weekly Shōnen Jump on July 6, 2020. Shueisha has collected its chapters into individual tankōbon volumes. The first volume (whose cover is a parody of the first Doraemon volume) was released on November 4, 2020. As of October 2, 2026, twenty-eight volumes have been released.

The series is published digitally in English language by Viz Media. In July 2021, Viz Media announced that they would published the volumes digitally; the first volume was released on October 26, 2021.

==== Volumes ====
No.	Original release date	Original ISBN	English release date	English ISBN
1	November 4, 2020	978-4-08-882509-0	October 26, 2021 (digital)	978-1-9747-2229-7
01. "Bondo & Roboco"; 02. "Meico & Roboco"; 03. "Her & Roboco"; 04. "The Mountains & Roboco"; 05. "Roboco? & Roboco"; 06. "Nyonta & Roboco"; 07. "Ghosts & Roboco"; 08. "The Past & Roboco"; 09. "Gorilla & Roboco"
* Cover parody: Doraemon volume 1
2	February 4, 2021	978-4-08-882548-9	January 25, 2022 (digital)	978-1-9747-3133-6
10. "Cooking & Roboco"; 11. "Part-Time Jobs & Roboco"; 12. "Motsuo & Meico"; 13. "Secrets & Roboco"; 14. "Ruri & Roboco"; 15. "Jump & Roboco"; 16. "Robomi & Roboco"; 17. "Volleyball & Roboco"; 18. "The Outdoors & Roboco"; 19. "Akane & Gorilla"
* Cover parody: One Piece volume 61
3	April 2, 2021	978-4-08-882595-3	April 26, 2022 (digital)	978-1-9747-3198-5
20. "Dieting & Roboco"; 21. "Mom & Roboco"; 22. "Twitter & Roboco"; 23. "The Promised Neverland & Roboco"; 24. "Ruri & the Tezuka Award"; 25. "Pants & Bondo"; 26. "Mods & Roboco"; 27. "Motesugi & Bondo"; 28. "Competitive Eating & Bondo"; 29. "Valentine's Day & Bondo"
* Cover parody: cover illustration of The Promised Neverland from Weekly Shōnen Jump's eighth issue of 2017
4	July 2, 2021	978-4-08-882708-7	July 26, 2022 (digital)	978-1-9747-3320-0
30. "Nyonta & Roboco"; 31. "Bondo & the Button"; 32. "Motsuo & Gorilla"; 33. "Meico & Roboco 2"; 34. "Shun & Bondo"; 35. "Manga & Roboco"; 36. "Akane & the Idiots"; 37. "Idols & Roboco"; 38. "Madoka & Bondo"; 39. "The Rough Patch & Roboco"
* Cover parody: Jujutsu Kaisen volume 4
5	October 4, 2021	978-4-08-882760-5	October 25, 2022 (digital)	978-1-9747-3545-7
40. "Blue & Roboco"; 41. "The Unknown & Roboco"; 42. "Goodbyes & Gorilla Gachi"; 43. "Motsuo & Meico 2"; 44. "Mom & Her Birthday"; 45. "Baseball & Gorilla"; 46. "Fortune-Telling & Roboco"; 47. "Ruri & the Slump"; 48. "Made-Up Words & Roboco"; 49. "Bondo & the Guys"
* Cover parody: My Hero Academia volume 1
6	January 4, 2022	978-4-08-882845-9	January 24, 2023 (digital)	978-1-9747-3596-9
50. "Ghost Stories & Roboco"; 51. "Psionics & Roboco"; 52. "Combined Issues & Roboco"; 53. "Knees & Roboco"; 54. "The Reader Survey & Roboco"; 55. "Chizuru & Roboco"; 56. "Dreams & Madoka"; 57. "Milly & Roboco"; 58. "The Choice & The Pair"; 59. "Coffee Shop & Meico"
* Cover parody: Demon Slayer: Kimetsu no Yaiba volume 15
7	March 4, 2022	978-4-08-883037-7	April 25, 2023 (digital)	978-1-9747-3848-9
60. "Popularity & Gorilla"; 61. "Love & Roboco"; 62. "Those Two & Good Behavior"; 63. "Canceling & Roboco"; 64. "Shun & Chizuru"; 65. "Ideals & Roboco"; 66. "Cuteness & Milly"; 67. "Photos & Bondo"; 68. "Ruri & The Editorial Department"; 69. "Bento & Roboco"
* Cover parody: Haikyu!! volume 1
8	June 3, 2022	978-4-08-883098-8	July 25, 2023 (digital)	978-1-9747-3970-7
70. "Holy Nights & Gorilla"; 71. "The New Year & Roboco"; 72. "Memories & Bondo"; 73. "DIY & Roboco"; 74. "First Snow & Roboco"; 75. "Movies & Roboco"; 76. "Akane & Chocolate"; 77. "Replacement & Roboco"; 78. "Ruri & Assistants"; 79. "Tally & Meico"
* Cover parody: Oshi no Ko volume 1
9	August 4, 2022	978-4-08-883196-1	October 24, 2023 (digital)	978-1-9747-4210-3
80. "Reciprocity & Motsuo"; 81. "Saturday Street Date & Bondo"; 82. "Followers & Roboco"; 83. "Akane & Roboco"; 84. "Hanami & Roboco"; 85. "Miyu-Miyu & Her Day Off"; 86. "One-Shots & Roboco"; 87. "Test Results & Bondo"; 88. "New Features & Roboco"; 89. "Adventure & the Boys"
* Cover parody: Death Note volume 1
10	October 4, 2022	978-4-08-883290-6	January 23, 2024 (digital)	978-1-9747-4448-0
90. "An Anime Series & Roboco"; 91. "Cosplay & Roboco"; 92. "Pudding & The Free-For-All"; 93. "Part-Time Job & Milly"; 94. "Fashion & Roboco"; 95. "The Amusement Park & Roboco"; 96. "The Amusement Park & Roboco 2"; 97. "Roboco & Roboco"; 98. "Horns & Roboco"; 99. "Chizuru & Shun"
* Cover parody: Chainsaw Man volume 1
11	December 2, 2022	978-4-08-883337-8	April 23, 2024 (digital)	978-1-9747-4542-5
100. "Dad & Roboco"; 101. "Mountain Spirits & Roboco"; 102. "Photo Albums & Roboco"; 103. "Snacks & the Field Trip"; 104. "Ruri & Takoyaki"; 105. "Training & Roboco"; 106. "Stargazing & Roboco"; 107. "The Destruction of Earth & Roboco"; 108. "Akane & The Confession"; 109. "Jump+ & Roboco"
* Cover parody: Hunter × Hunter volume 12
12	March 3, 2023	978-4-08-883432-0	July 23, 2024 (digital)	978-1-9747-4830-3
110. "Stylists & Roboco"; 111. "Puzzle Solving & Roboco"; 112. "Cinderella & Roboco"; 113. "TikTok & Roboco"; 114. "The World Cup & Roboco"; 115. "Infinity & Roboco"; 116. "First Encounters & Roboco"; 117. "Body Swaps & Roboco"; 118. "Holy Nights & Second Year"; 119. "First Date & Bondo"
* Cover parody: Naruto volume 5
13	June 2, 2023	978-4-08-883554-9	October 22, 2024 (digital)	978-1-9747-5069-6
120. "The Hyakunin Isshu & Roboco"; 121. "Oha Suta & Roboco"; 122. "FamilyMart & Roboco"; 123. "Texting & Roboco"; 124. "Girls Hangout & Roboco"; 125. "EDEN & Roboco"; 126. "EDEN & Roboco 2"; 127. "Ping-Pong & Roboco"; 128. "Virality & Roboco"; 129. "The Mountains & Serizawa"
* Cover parody: World Trigger volume 1
14	August 4, 2023	978-4-08-883590-7	January 28, 2025 (digital)	978-1-9747-5337-6
130. "OrderMaids & Roboco"; 131. "Laila & Roboco"; 132. "The Diary & Akane"; 133. "Kendama & Roboco"; 134. "Grand Prix & Roboco"; 135. "Gorio & Gorilla"; 136. "Ultimate Technique & Roboco"; 137. "Old Maid & Roboco"; 138. "Comebacks & Roboco"; 139. "Dance & Roboco"
* Cover parody: Sakamoto Days volume 9
15	November 2, 2023	978-4-08-883689-8	April 22, 2025 (digital)	978-1-9747-5457-1
140. "Birthplace & Nyonta"; 141. "Actress & Roboco"; 142. "A New Menu & Roboco"; 143. "Motsuo & Goodbyes"; 144. "Motsuo & His Friends"; 145. "Study Jump & Gorilla"; 146. "Roboco & GPT"; 147. "Rampancy & Roboco"; 148. "Infiltration & Roboco"; 149. "Maboroshi & Roboco"
* Cover parody: Dr. Stone volume 1
16	January 4, 2024	978-4-08-883796-3	July 22, 2025 (digital)	978-1-9747-5732-9
150. "Maboroshi & Roboco"; 151. "Rio & Roboco"; 152. "Roboco-1 Grand Prix"; 153. "Burnout & Roboco"; 154. "The Athletics Festival & The Boys"; 155. "Motsuo & The Aftermath"; 156. "Homage & Roboco"; 157. "The Multiverse & Roboco"; 158. "The Multiverse & Roboco 2"; 159. "The Multiverse & Roboco 3"
* Cover parody: Blue Box volume 9
17	April 4, 2024	978-4-08-883879-3	October 28, 2025 (digital)	978-1-9747-5870-8
160. "The Multiverse & Roboco 4"; 161. "From Me Not to You & Roboco"; 162. "Dieting & Roboco"; 163. "Shogi & a Date"; 164. "Word of the Year & Roboco"; 165. "The Class Reunion & The Miracle Generation"; 166. "The Gang & Oden"; 167. "2023 & Roboco"; 168. "New Year's Fortunetelling & Roboco"; 169. "Kanio & Roboco"
* Cover parody: YuYu Hakusho volume 1
18	July 4, 2024	978-4-08-884127-4	January 27, 2026 (digital)	978-1-9747-6385-6
170. "Lyrics & Roboco"; 171. "The Title Match & Madoka"; 172. "Digital Art & Roboco"; 173. "Sleuthing & Motsuo"; 174. "Akane & Akane"; 175. "Chief of Police for the Day & Roboco"; 176. "Reconciliation & Those Two"; 177. "Gramps & Roboco"; 178. "The Wind & Tatsunori"; 179. "Plot Threads & Roboco"
* Cover parody: Bakuman volume 12
19	September 4, 2024	978-4-08-884166-3	April 28, 2026 (digital)	978-1-9747-6505-8
180. "MC & Roboco"; 181. "Brother & Akane"; 182. "Rice & Friends"; 183. “Sneaking & Roboco”; 184. "Touring & Roboco"; 185. "Romantic Comedy & Bondo"; 186. "Best Friends & Roboco"; 187. "Fishing & Roboco"; 188. "Fishing & Bondo 2"; 189. "Fishing & Bondo 3"
* Cover parody: To Love Ru volume 1
20	January 4, 2025	978-4-08-884286-8	July 28, 2026 (digital)	978-1-9747-6838-7
190. "Kaoru & Bondo"; 191. "Shogi & Bondo"; 192. "Haiku & Roboco"; 193. "Ninja & Roboco"; 194. "New Editor-in-Chief & Roboco"; 195. "Sci-Fi & Roboco"; 196. "Sci-Fi & Roboco 2"; 197. "MHA & Bondo"; 198. "Mahjong & Roboco"; 199. "Kaoru & Friends"
* Cover parody: Toriko volume 1
21	April 4, 2025	978-4-08-884391-9	October 27, 2026 (digital)	978-1-9747-6888-2
200. "Roboco Juniors & Bondo"; 201. "Peddling & Roboco"; 202. "Akane & Spiriting Away"; 203. "Jujutsu & Roboco"; 204. "World History & Bondo"; 205. "Hot Boys & Roboco"; 206. "Ruri & The Serialization Conference"; 207. "Halloween & Roboco"; 208. "Publicity & Roboco"; 209. "Praise & Bondo"
* Cover parody: Case Closed volume 1
22	May 2, 2025	978-4-08-884515-9	—	—
210. "The Relationship Chart & Roboco"; 211. "Manga Prizes & Roboco"; 212. "Undead Unluck & Roboco"; 213. "Traitors & Roboco"; 214. "Gigantism & Roboco"; 215. "Weddings & Roboco"; 216. "Ski Slopes & Roboco"; 217. "Tome & Hana"; 218. "Documentary & Roboco"; 219. "Double Date & Akane"
* Cover parody: Undead Unluck volume 1
23	August 4, 2025	978-4-08-884612-5	—	—
220. "Gallery Shows & Roboco"; 221. "Extracurriculars & Bondo"; 222. "Sauna & Roboco"; 223. "Ano-Chan & Roboco"; 224. "The Prince & The Gang"; 225. "Kawasaki Frontale & Roboco"; 226. "Sensei & Roboco"; 227. "Coffee Shop & Roboco"; 228. "Everyone & Camp Cooking"; 229. "Detective & Roboco"
* Cover parody: The Prince of Tennis volume 1
24	November 4, 2025	978-4-08-884748-1	—	—
230. "Gorilla & Motsuo"; 231. "Rivals & Roboco"; 232. "Heroines & Roboco"; 233. "The Multiverse & Roboco II"; 234. "The Multiverse & Roboco II 2"; 235. "The Multiverse & Roboco II 3"; 236. "Shopping & Roboco"; 237. "Student Discipline Rep & Gorilla"; 238. "Driving School & Roboco"; 239. "Kiss Knee & The Trio"
* Cover parody: Black Clover volume 1
25	February 4, 2026	978-4-08-884836-5	—	—
240. "The Date & Kaoru"; 241. "Karaoke & The Gang"; 242. "Meico & Roboco"; 243. "Playing Alone & Bondo"; 244. "Homecoming & Roboco"; 245. "Roboco & Banashi"; 246. "Akane & The Haunted Village"; 247. "The Fan & Roboco"; 248. "Study Session & The Trio"; 249. "The Drive & the Two"
* Cover parody: Akane-banashi volume 1
26	May 1, 2026	978-4-08-885041-2	—	—
250. "Classic Lines & Roboco"; 251. "Mysteries & Motsuo"; 252. "Protagonists & Bondo"; 253. "Essays & Chizuru"; 254. "Radio & Roboco"; 255. "Bellybands & the Gang"; 256. "Running Away & Bondo"; 257. "Barista & Roboco"; 258. "Bondo & Parents’ Day”; 259. "Ruri & Manga"
* Cover parody: Dragon Quest: The Adventure of Dai volume 1
27	August 4, 2026	978-4-08-885140-2	—	—
260. "Roboco & You Could Say"; 261. "Roboco & Assassins"; 262. "Roboco & Sea Fishing"; 263. "Bondo & Debate"; 264. "Bondo & The Jump Ban"; 265. "Roboco & the Demon Realm"; 266. "Roboco & The Devil Python"; 267. "Roboco & Bowling"; 268. "Akane & Gorilla"; 269. "Gorilla & Gushing"
* Cover parody: Kimi ni Todoke volume 1
28	October 2, 2026	978-4-08-885206-5	—	—
270. "Series Pitch & Roboco"; 271. "Motsuo's Dad & YouTube"; 272. "Jujutsu Modulo & Roboco"; 273. "Roboco & Bellyband Blurbs"; 274. "The Gang & Sushi"; 275. "Underground Shogi & Madoka"; 276. "Redecorating & Bondo"; 277. "Editorial & Roboco"; 278. "Roboco the Body Double"; 279. "Golden Week & the Trio"
* Cover parody: Kagurabachi volume 1

==== Chapters not yet in tankōbon format ====
- 280. "Inside Roboco"
- 281. "Showa Gags & Roboco"
- 282. "Debt & Roboco"
- 283. "Fashion & Roboco"
- 284. "The World Knee Cup & the Gang"
- 285. "The Secret Base & the Trio"
- 286. "Cooking Class & Roboco"
- 287. "Akane & Gorilla Gachi 2"
- 288. "Mixer & Roboco"
- 289. "Digicam & Roboco"
- 290. "Grandpa & Roboco"
- 291. "Blue & Roboco 2"
- 292. "Breakfast & Everybody"
- 293. "Gramps & Roboco"
- 294. "Promised Neverland & Roboco 2"
- 295. "Class Shirts & The Trio"
- 296. "Strength Training & Roboco"
- 297. "Magic Spells & Akane"
- 298. "Second Year & Dating"
- 299. "Sticker Swap & the Girls"
- 300. "Bondo & Style"
- 301. "The Pet Shop & Roboco"
- 302. "Poetry & Roboco"
- 303. "Ruri & Her Rebellious Phase"
- 304. "Everyone & Lunches"
- 305. "Witch & Roboco"

=== Anime ===
In May 2022, it was announced that the series would be adapted into an anime television series. The series is produced by Gallop, and directed by Akitaro Daichi, with Michihiro Sato serving as assistant director, Sayuri Ooba overseeing the series' scripts, and Yūko Ebara designing the characters. It was broadcast for 28 episodes from December 5, 2022, to June 19, 2023, on TV Tokyo and its affiliates, and consists of five-minute episodes. The theme song is "lol" by Gang Parade. Crunchyroll streamed the series outside of Asia.

==== Film ====
A film adaptation was announced in June 2023. It was later announced to be an anime film. It was planned to premiere in Q4 2024; however, it was delayed to improve the film's quality, and premiered on April 18, 2025. The film's theme song is "Lolilokkyun Robo" (ロりロっきゅんロぼ♡, Rorirokkiyun Robo), performed by Ano. Crunchyroll began streaming the film in February 2026.

=== Other ===
In July 2022, a live-action project was announced. It was later revealed to be a collaboration with cosplayer Enako, and a Roboco figure produced by Sentinel Co., Ltd. as part of its Riobot series of figurines.

== Reception ==
Me & Roboco was nominated for the Best Printed Manga category in the 2021 Next Manga Awards and placed thirteenth out of 50 nominees. The series ranked eleventh on the Nationwide Bookstore Employees' Recommended Comics of 2022.
