= Momona Kasahara =

Japanese singer and actress (born 2003)

- 笠原 桃奈
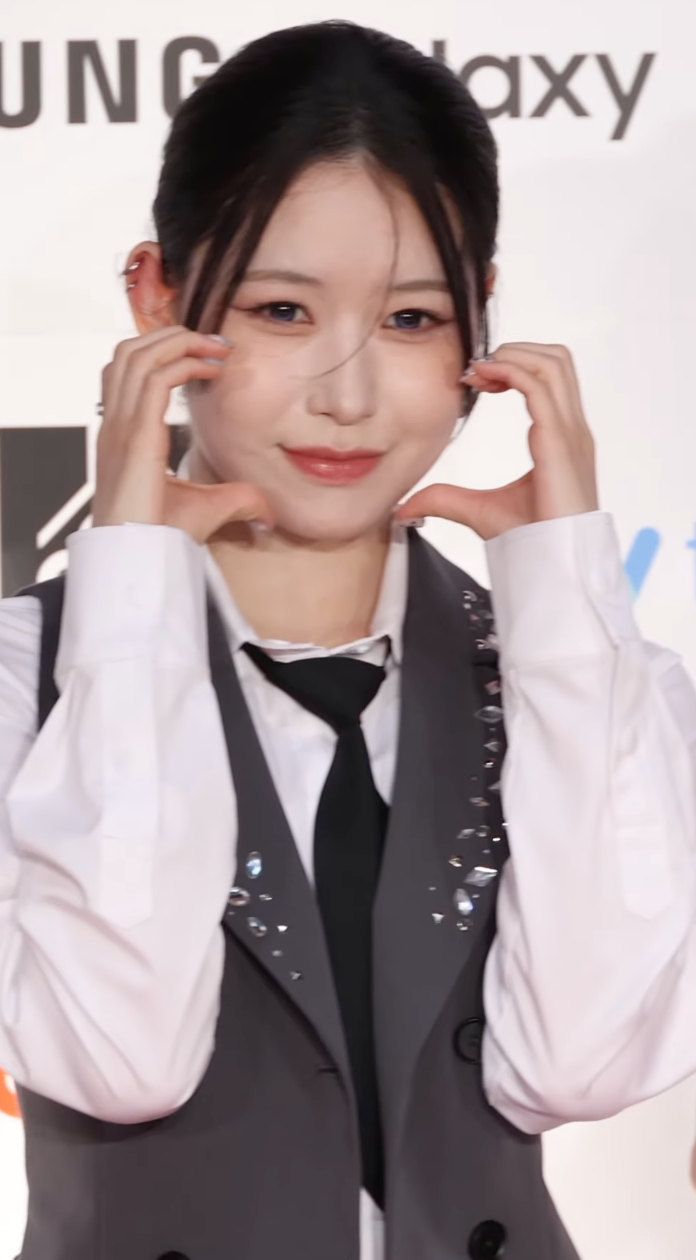
- Momona at KCON JAPAN 2026, May 2026
- Born: October 22, 2003 (age 23); Kanagawa, Japan
- Occupations: Singer; Actress
- Years active: 2016–present
- Agent: Lapone Girls
- Musical career
- Genre: J-pop
- Instrument: Vocals
- Label: Lapone Girls
- Member of: ME:I
- Formerly of: Angerme
- Website: Official website

Japanese name
- Kanji: 笠原 桃奈
- Hiragana: かさはら ももな
- Romanization: Kasahara Momona

Momona Kasahara (笠原 桃奈, Kasahara Momona; born October 22, 2003) is a Japanese singer and actress. She is the leader of the Japanese girl group ME:I, which was formed through the reality competition show Produce 101 Japan The Girls. She secured first place in the show's final ranking and debuted as a member of the group in 2024. Previously, she was a member of the idol group Angerme under Hello! Project from 2016 to 2021. She performs under the name MOMONA when appearing as a member of ME:I. In 2025, she made her voice acting debut as Nani in the Japanese dub of Disney's Lilo & Stitch (2025 film).

== Background and Early Life ==
Momona Kasahara was born on October 22, 2003. She began practicing ballet at the age of three and continued for nine years.

== Career ==
In April 2015, Kasahara joined Hello Pro Kenshusei (Hello! Project Trainee).

On May 5, 2016, she participated in the "Hello! Project Trainee Recital 2016 Spring" at Nakano Sunplaza, where she performed Morning Musume's "Itoshiku Kurushii Kono Yoru ni" and received the Best Performance Award. On July 16, 2016, during the opening day of the Hello! Project 2016 Summer concert tour at Nihon Tokushu Tōgyō Civic Center, it was announced that she would join Angerme.She joined Hello! Project in 2016 at the age of 12, making her the youngest member at the time. On October 19, 2016, she made her first appearance in a musical release as a member of Angerme with the group’s 22nd single.

On June 21, 2021, Kasahara announced that she would graduate from Angerme and Hello! Project by the end of the year, and that she planned to leave the entertainment industry temporarily to study singing and dancing abroad. On November 15, 2021, her graduation concert "Angerme Concert 2021 ~~Tougenkyo~~ Momona Kasahara Graduation Special" was held at Nippon Budokan. She officially graduated from the group and ended her exclusive contract with Up-Front Promotion. On the same day, her final photo book Dear sister, co-edited by Yū Aoi and Akiko Kikuchi, was released. The photo book project was initiated after Aoi and Kikuchi voluntarily submitted a proposal to Up-Front Promotion, inspired by Kasahara's graduation.

On September 3, 2023, Kasahara was announced as one of the 101 trainees on the survival audition program "Produce 101 Japan The Girls." From October 5, 2023, public voting began, and she ranked 1st in the first round, 3rd in the second, and 1st again in the third. On December 16, 2023, in the show's live finale broadcast on TBS, she ranked 1st with 1,116,716 votes, earning her a place in the debut lineup of the girl group ME:I.

On February 26, 2024, she was appointed as the leader of ME:I. She served as the center for the group's debut single "Click," released on April 17, 2024, as part of the 1st single "MIRAI." On July 11, 2024, it was announced that her official member color in ME:I was black.

In March 2025, she served as the Host of The Month on Fuji TV's "Mezamashi TV." In April 2025, it was announced that she would voice the character Nani in the Japanese dub of the live-action Disney film "Lilo & Stitch (2025 film)," scheduled for release on June 6, 2025. She was selected through auditions held in the United States, with her acting and vocal abilities receiving high praise, marking her voice acting debut.

== Filmography ==
=== Television ===
List of television programs, with the release year, role, and note
Year	Title	Role	Note	Ref.
2020	Hobonichi no Kaidan: Takawarai Suru Onna	Suzuka Sasaki	Lead role, Television Kanagawa	
2023	Produce 101 Japan The Girls	Contestant	Finished 1st,TBS	
2024	Numa ni Hamatte Kiitemita: Fashion Numa Special		NHK Educational TV, live broadcast	
2025	Mezamashi TV	Host of the month		

=== Film ===
List of Japanese dubbing works, with release year, role and note
Year	Title	Role	Notes	Ref.
2026	The Mouths	Mirei		

=== Japanese dub ===
List of Japanese dubbing works, with release year, role and note
Year	Title	Role	Voice double	Notes	Ref.
2025	Lilo & Stitch	Nani Pelekai	Sydney Agudong	Disney live-action film	

=== Theatre ===
List of Theatre, with the release year, role, and note
Year	Title	Role	Note	Ref.
2016	Mode	Kayo Misaki	Zenrosai Hall	
2017	Yume Miru Television	Chiyo Nitta	Zenrosai Hall	
2018	Attack No.1	Suzume Obata	Zenrosai Hall	

=== Streaming programs ===
List of Streaming programs, with the release year, role, and note
Year	Title	Role	Note	Ref.
2025	Mr. Trot Japan	Sub-MC (semi-final/final)	Lemino	

=== Radio ===
List of Radio, with the release year, role, and note
Year	Title	Role	Note	Ref.
2016–2019	Hello! Drive! - Harodora -	Thursday/Friday host	Radio NEO	
