= Masturi =

Masturi may refer to:

- Masrezwan Masturi (born 1981), soccer player from Singapore
- Masturi Assembly constituency, Bilaspur district, Chhattisgarh, India

== See also ==
- Mastery (disambiguation)
- Matsuri (disambiguation)
