= Last Gang Parade =

Studio album by Gang Parade
- Released: January 8, 2019
- Genre: J-pop
- Length: 42:02
- Language: Japanese
- Label: WACK; T-Palette Records

Gang Parade chronology
Gang Parade Takes Themselves Higher!! (2017)	Last Gang Parade (2019)	Love Parade (2019)

Singles from Last Gang Parade
- 1. "Breaking the Road" Released: February 20, 2018; 2. "Gang 2" Released: May 29, 2018; 3. "Can't Stop" Released: September 11, 2018

Last Gang Parade is the fourth studio album from Japanese girl group Gang Parade. It was released on January 8, 2019, by T-Palette Records and consists of ten tracks.

== Track listing ==
No.	Title	Lyrics	Music	Length
1.	"Last"	Kenta Matsukuma, JxSxK	Kenta Matsukuma	4:33
2.	"Gang 2"	Kenta Matsukuma, JxSxK	Kenta Matsukuma	4:44
3.	"Message"	Miki Yamamachi	Kenta Matsukuma	4:26
4.	"Heretic"	Saki Kamiya	Kenta Matsukuma	4:40
5.	"Breaking the Road"	Kenta Matsukuma, JxSxK	Kenta Matsukuma	3:29
6.	"Jealousy Marionnette"	Yuka Terashima	LyLy	4:06
7.	"Yoru Kurai Mu" (夜暗い夢)	Yua Yumeno, Haruna Bad Chiiiin	Haruna Bad Chiiiin	3:51
8.	"Tadashī Kotae ga Mitsukaranakute" (正しい答えが見つからなくて)	Yui Ga Dockson	Kenta Matsukuma	3:26
9.	"Can't Stop"	Kenta Matsukuma, JxSxK	Kenta Matsukuma	4:41
10.	"Bond"	Yua Yumeno	Momen	4:01
Total length:				42:02

== Charts ==
Chart	Peak position
Japanese Albums (Oricon)	4
Japanese Albums (Billboard)	6
