= Matsuri (disambiguation) =

Matsuri refers to Japanese festivals.

Matsuri may also refer to:

== People ==
- Matsuri Akino, a Japanese manga artist
- Matsuri Arai (荒井 祭里; born 2001), Japanese diver
- Matsuri Hino, a Japanese manga artist
- Natsuiro Matsuri, a virtual YouTuber affiliated with Hololive Production
- Matsuri, guitarist for Japanese heavy metal music ensemble Hanabie.

== Fictional characters ==
- Matsuri Hiiragi (柊 まつり), a fictional character from the anime/manga series Lucky Star
- Matsuri Sakuragi, a fictional character from the Japanese manga series Strawberry Marshmallow
- Matsuri Shihou, a fictional character from Sola (manga)
- Matsuri Tatsumi, a fictional character from Super Sentai series, Kyuukyuu Sentai GoGoFive.
- Matsuri Tokugawa (徳川 まつり), a fictional character from The Idolmaster Million Live!

== Other ==
- Matsuri, Estonia, a village in Estonia
- Matsuri (band), Japanese band
- "Matsuri" (song), by Fujii Kaze from the album Love All Serve All
- "Matsuri", a song by Kitarō from the album Kojiki
- Anime Matsuri, an annual anime convention in Houston, United States
- Higurashi Matsuri, the fourth Higurashi series
- Matsuricon, an annual anime convention in Columbus, United States

== See also ==
- Masturi (disambiguation)
