= Love Parade (Gang Parade album) =

Studio album by Gang Parade
- Released: November 13, 2019
- Genre: J-pop
- Length: 40:32
- Language: Japanese
- Label: WACK; Fueled By Mentaiko

Gang Parade chronology
Last Gang Parade (2019)	Love Parade (2019)	Our Parade (2023)

Singles from Love Parade
- 1. "Brand New Parade" Released: April 17, 2019; 2. "Love Communication" Released: August 31, 2019

Love Parade is the fifth studio album from Japanese girl group Gang Parade. It was released on November 13, 2019, by Fueled By Mentaiko and consists of eleven tracks.

== Track listing ==
All music composed by Kenta Matsukuma.

No.	Title	Lyrics	Length
1.	"Lovu" (らびゅ)	JxSxK, Kenta Matsukuma	4:27
2.	"Brand New Parade" (ブランニューパレード)	JxSxK, Kenta Matsukuma	3:27
3.	"Wake up Beat!"	Shuko Nemoto, Miki Yamamachi	4:15
4.	"Alone"	Yua Yumeno	3:02
5.	"Youthful Hero"	Yuka Terashima	3:51
6.	"Ready Go!"	Yua Yumeno	3:50
7.	"Fake and Fantasy"	Momen	1:39
8.	"Poison"	Coco Partin Coco	3:02
9.	"Plastic Smile"	Shill	3:57
10.	"Wonderful World"	Naruhaworld	4:15
11.	"Love Communication"	Kenta Matsukuma, Yota Tsujiyama	4:39
Total length:			40:32

== Charts ==
Chart	Peak position
Japanese Albums (Oricon)	2
Japanese Albums (Billboard)	4
