= Our Parade =

Studio album by Gang Parade
- Released: May 10, 2023
- Genre: J-pop
- Length: 54:23
- Language: Japanese
- Label: WACK; Fueled By Mentaiko

Gang Parade chronology
Love Parade (2019)	Our Parade (2023)	The Night Park E.P. (2023)

Singles from Our Parade
- 1. "Parade Goes On" Released: March 9, 2022; 2. "Signal" Released: July 4, 2022; 3. "Priority" Released: November 11, 2022; 4. "LOL (Laughing Out Loud)" Released: January 3, 2023

Our Parade is the sixth studio album from Japanese girl group Gang Parade. It was released on May 10, 2023, by Fueled By Mentaiko and consists of fourteen tracks.

== Track listing ==
Our Parade track listing
No.	Title	Lyrics	Music	Length
1.	"Enjoy Our Parade"	JxSxK	Yunosy	4:27
2.	"Parade Goes On" (13 Soul ver.)	Hige Driver	Kenta Matsukuma	4:05
3.	"Signal" (シグナル)	Gang Parade	Kenta Matsukuma	3:46
4.	"Super Party People"	Coco Partin Coco	K2A7	4:12
5.	"Anything Goes!!!!"	Can GP Maika	Shota Mohri	3:41
6.	"Girls"	Miki Yamamachi	Kenta Matsukuma	3:11
7.	"LOL (Laughing Out Loud)"	Gang Parade	Yoko Nagai	2:52
8.	"Genkai Shōjo" (限界少女)	Ainastar	Masayuki Iwade	4:02
9.	"Exotic Animal" (エキゾチックアニマル)	Yui Ga Dockson	Kenta Matsukuma	3:36
10.	"Unlimited"	Miki Yamamachi	Kenta Matsukuma	3:13
11.	"Invoke"	Yua Yumeno, Miki Yamamachi	Yoko Nagai	4:18
12.	"Sayonara Metropolis" (さよならメトロポリス)	Yuka Terashima	You-oh Oki	3:38
13.	"Beautiful Days"	Gang Parade	Kenta Matsukuma	5:00
14.	"Priority"	Kenta Matsukuma, JxSxK	Kenta Matsukuma	4:16
Total length:				54:23

== Charts ==
Chart performance for Our Parade
Chart	Peak position
Japanese Albums (Oricon)	1
Japanese Combined Albums (Oricon)	2
Japanese Hot Albums (Billboard Japan)	1
