= Brand New Parade =

Single by Gang Parade

from the album Love Parade
- B-side: "Dreamer"
- Released: April 17, 2019
- Genre: J-pop
- Length: 14:14
- Label: Fueled by Mentaiko

Gang Parade singles chronology
"Can't Stop" (2018)	"Brand New Parade" (2019)	"Parade Goes On" (2022)

Music video
- "Brand New Parade" on YouTube

"Brand New Parade" (ブランニューパレード) is the major label debut single by the Japanese girl group Gang Parade, released on April 17, 2019, by Fueled by Mentaiko. The single peaked at number 2 on the Oricon Singles Chart and number 6 on the Japan Hot 100. On September 11, 2019, the single was awarded the Gold disc certification by RIAJ.

== Track listing ==
All music by Kenta Matsukuma.

CD single
No.	Title	Lyrics	Length
1.	"Brand New Parade" (ブランニューパレード)	JxSxK, Kenta Matsukuma	3:27
2.	"Dreamer"	Yuka Terashima	3:39
3.	"Brand New Parade - Instrumental" (ブランニューパレード)		3:27
4.	"Dreamer - Instrumental"		3:39
Total length:			14:14

== Charts ==
=== Weekly charts ===
Weekly chart performance for "Brand New Parade"
Chart (2023)	Peak position
Japan (Japan Hot 100)	6
Japan (Oricon)	2

== Certifications ==
Certifications and sales for "Brand New Parade"
Region	Certification	Certified units/sales
Japan (RIAJ)	Gold	100,000^{^}
^{^} Shipments figures based on certification alone.
