= Me:I =

Japanese girl group

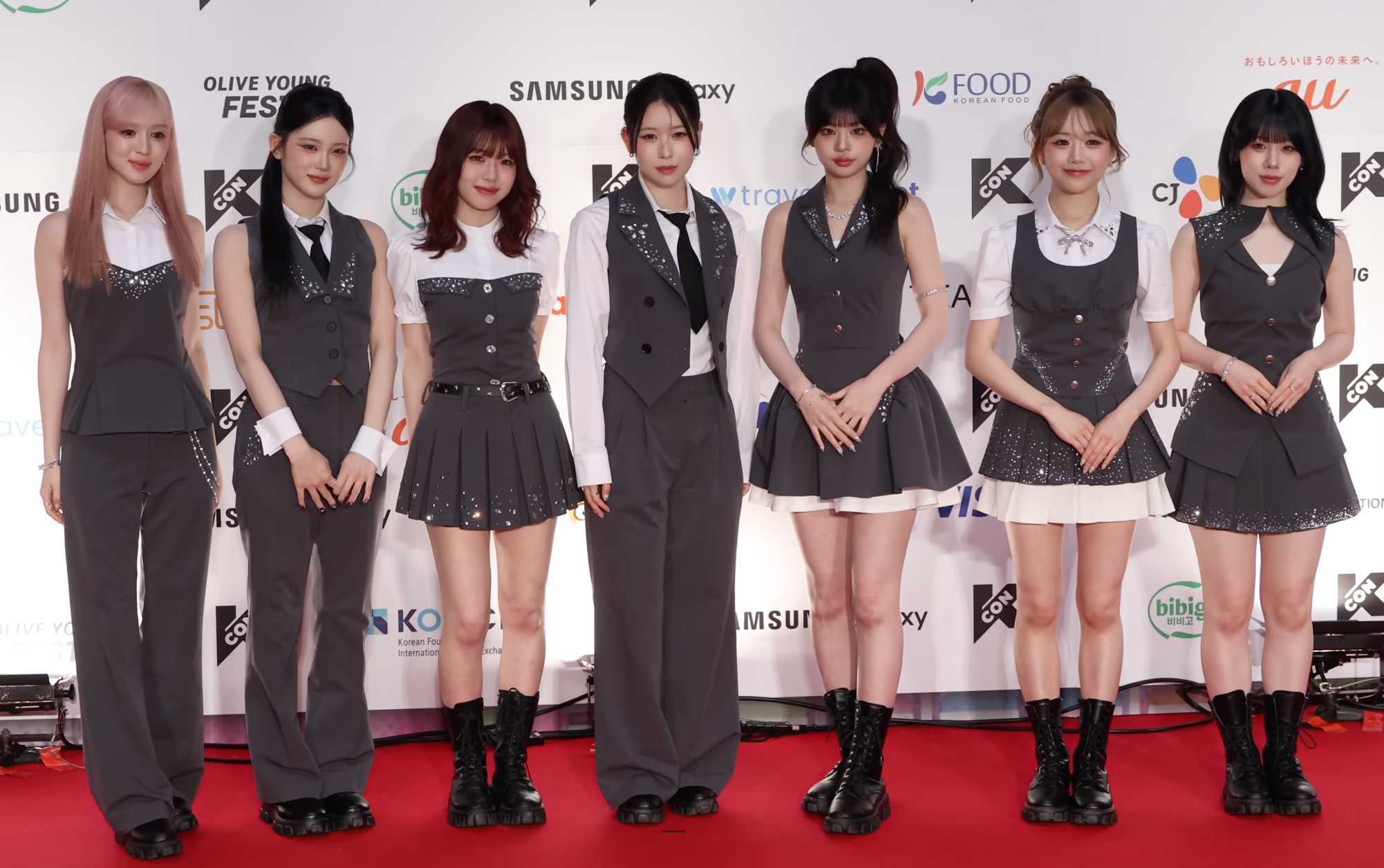
- Me:I in May 2026

Background information
- Origin: Aichi, Japan
- Genre: J-pop
- Years active: 2023–present
- Label: Lapone Girls
- Members: Tsuzumi Ebihara; Momona Kasahara; Rinon Murakami; Miu Sakurai; Keiko Shimizu; Ayane Takami; Suzu Yamamoto
- Past members: Shizuku Iida; Ran Ishii; Cocoro Kato; Kokona Sasaki
- Website: me-i.jp

Me:I (Japanese: ミーアイ, Hepburn: Mīai; stylized in all caps) is a Japanese girl group formed through the reality competition show Produce 101 Japan The Girls. The group is composed of seven members: Momona Kasahara, Rinon Murakami, Ayane Takami, Miu Sakurai, Suzu Yamamoto, Keiko Shimizu and Tsuzumi Ebihara. Originally formed with eleven members, Cocoro Kato, Kokona Sasaki, Shizuku Iida and Ran Ishii left the group on December 31, 2025. They debuted with the single Mirai on April 17, 2024. The group is managed by Lapone Girls, a subsidiary of Lapone Entertainment.

== Name ==
The group's name, "Me:I", means "an idol who is loved by everyone, an idol of the future, moving forward together towards the future". When spoken, it sounds like the Japanese word 未来 (mirai, "future"). The name was revealed in the final episode of Produce 101 Japan The Girls.

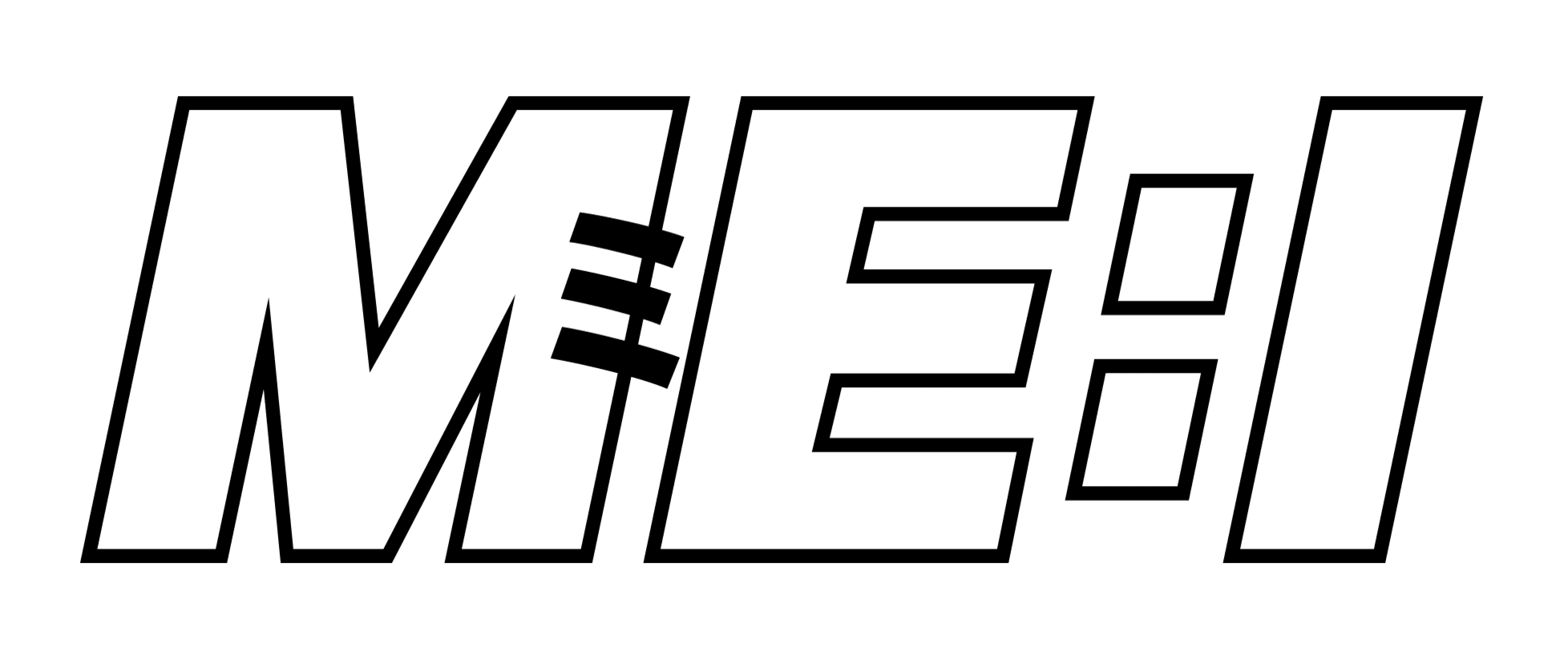
Official logo

== History ==
=== 2023: Formation through Produce 101 Japan The Girls ===
Me:I was formed through the reality competition show Produce 101 Japan The Girls, which was aired primarily on the streaming service Lemino from October 5 to December 16, 2023. A total of 14,000 participants auditioned for the show, ranging in age from 15 to 25 and not affiliated with any talent agency. The final 11 trainees were picked by viewers from the original 101 trainees through online voting and announced during a live television broadcast on TBS. Like the previous winners of Produce 101 Japan, Me:I is intended to be a permanent group without restriction on activity duration.

Several members of Me:I had experience in the entertainment industry before the show. Momona Kasahara was a member of the Hello! Project girl group Angerme from 2016 to 2021. Ran Ishii was a member of the girl group Girls² and appeared in the Japanese drama Secret × Heroine Phantomirage!. Cocoro Kato was a member of the South Korean girl group Cherry Bullet under FNC Entertainment. Miu Sakurai was a contestant on Nizi Project and Girls Planet 999, while Suzu Yamamoto spent six months as a trainee at a South Korean agency.

=== 2024–present: Debut with Mirai, departure of members ===
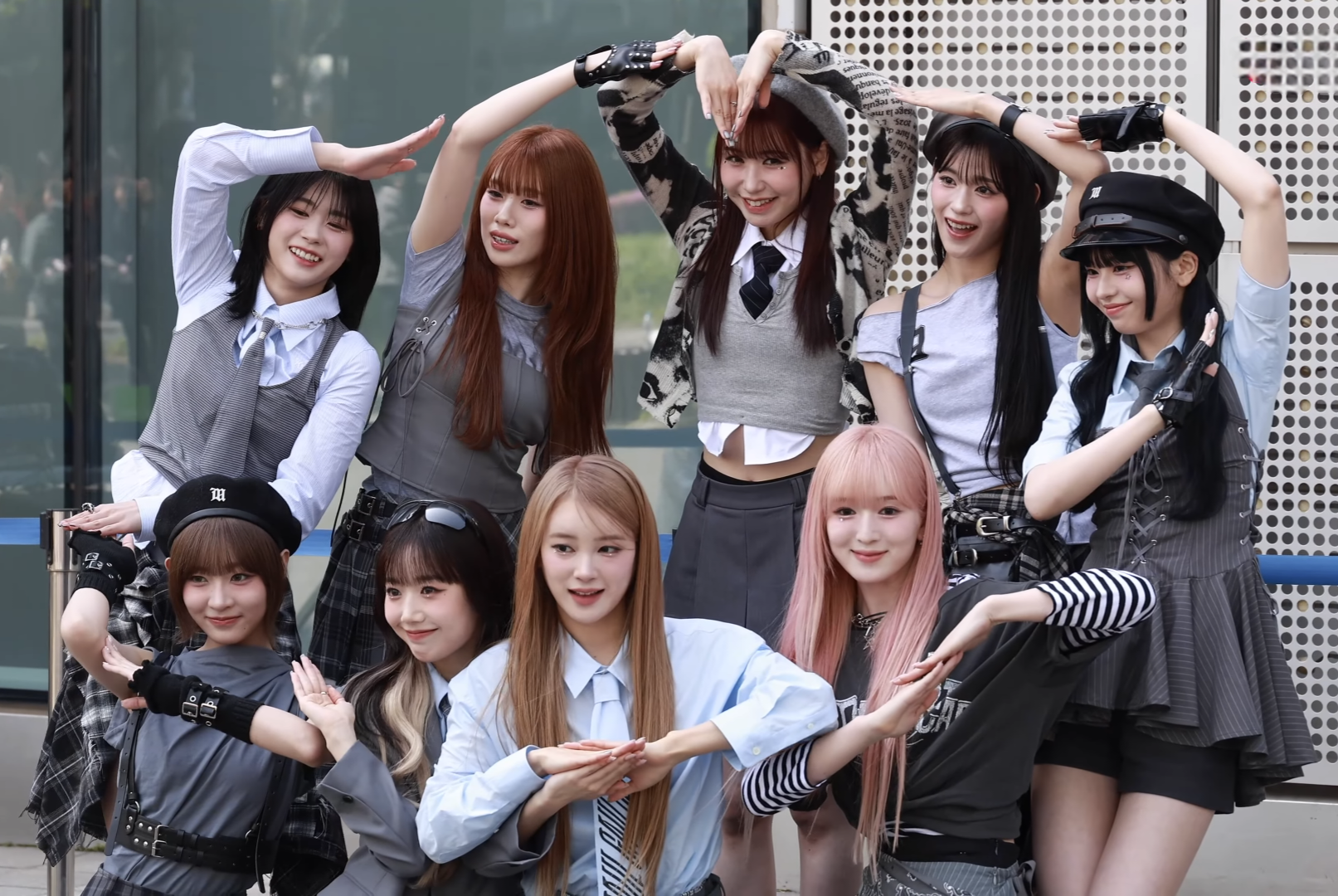
Me:I in April 2025

Me:I gave their first performance as a group ahead of debut at the 38th Tokyo Girls Collection 2024 Spring/Summer on March 2, 2024. On April 14, the group concluded their first fan concert, 2024 Me:I Launching Show Me:Iconic, which was held in two cities and attracted approximately 65,000 people. Me:I officially debuted with the single Mirai on April 17, topping the Oricon Singles Chart with over 232,000 copies sold. Its lead track, "Click", peaked at second place on the Billboard Japan Hot 100. On July 1, Lapone announced that Ebihara would be temporarily absent from the group's activities due to "poor health". Me:I released their second single Hi-Five on August 28, 2024; the title track topped the Japan Hot 100. On November 25, Me:I released the Japanese version of "Beyond" (End Credit Version) from Moana 2 on digital platforms.

On December 22, 2025, Lapone Entertainment announced that Shizuku Iida, Ran Ishii, Cocoro Kato, and Kokona Sasaki would not renew their exclusive contract and would end their activities with the group starting December 31.

== Members ==
Current members

- Tsuzumi Ebihara (海老原 鼓, Ebihara Tsuzumi)
- Momona Kasahara (笠原 桃奈, Kasahara Momona) – leader
- Rinon Murakami (村上 璃杏, Murakami Rinon)
- Miu Sakurai (櫻井 美羽, Sakurai Miu)
- Keiko Shimizu (清水 恵子, Shimizu Keiko)
- Ayane Takami (高見 文寧, Takami Ayane)
- Suzu Yamamoto (山本 すず, Yamamoto Suzu)

Former members

- Shizuku Iida (飯田 栞月, Iida Shizuku) (2023–2025)
- Ran Ishii (石井 蘭, Ishii Ran) – sub-leader (2023–2025)
- Cocoro Kato (加藤 心, Katō Kokoro) (2023–2025)
- Kokona Sasaki (佐々木 心菜, Sasaki Kokona) (2023–2025)

== Discography ==
=== Albums ===
List of albums, with selected chart positions and sales, showing year released and album name
Title	Details	Peak chart positions			Sales	Certifications
Title	Details	JPN	JPN Comb.	JPN Hot	Sales	Certifications
Who I Am	Released: September 3, 2025; Label: Lapone Girls; Formats: CD, digital download, streaming	3	3	3	JPN: 125,750 (Note: Japanese cumulative physical and digital sales of Who I Am as of January 2026)	RIAJ: Gold (phy.)

=== Singles ===
List of singles as lead artist, with selected chart positions and sales, showing year released, certification and album name
Title (Note: A maxi single release that has a different title from any songs in it will be considered as an "EP single" with its title being italicized. Its respective lead track is categorized under promotional single.)	Year	Peak chart positions		Sales	Certifications	Album
Title	Year	JPN	JPN Comb.	Sales	Certifications	Album
Mirai	2024	1	1	JPN: 289,807	RIAJ: Platinum (phy.)	Non-album singles
Hi-Five	2024	2	2	JPN: 295,300	RIAJ: Platinum (phy.)	Non-album singles
Muse	2025	1	1	JPN: 229,860	RIAJ: Platinum (phy.)	Non-album singles
Flower Road (花咲く道, Hanasaku Michi)	2026	3	3	JPN: 116,489	RIAJ: Gold (phy.)	Non-album singles

=== Promotional singles ===
List of promotional singles, with selected chart positions, showing year released and album name
Title	Year	Peak chart positions		Sales	Certifications	Album
Title	Year	JPN Comb.	JPN Hot	Sales	Certifications	Album
"Click"	2024	1	2	JPN: 4,004	RIAJ: Gold (st.)	Mirai (single)
"Sugar Bomb"	2024	1	79			Mirai (single)
"Hi-Five"	2024	2	1	JPN: 6,176		Hi-Five (single)
"Tomorrow"	2024	— (Note: "Tomorrow" did not enter the Combined Singles Chart, but appeared at number 11 on the download component chart.)	92	JPN: 2,805		Sweetie (single)
"Beyond" (End Credit Version)	2024	— (Note: "Beyond" (End Credit Version) did not enter the Combined Singles Chart, but appeared at number 25 on the download component chart.)	— (Note: "Beyond" (End Credit Version) did not enter the Hot 100, but appeared at number 25 on the download component chart.)	JPN: 1,508		Moana 2: Japanese Original Motion Picture Soundtrack
"Sweetie"	2024	— (Note: "Sweetie" did not enter the Combined Singles Chart, but appeared at number 16 on the download component chart.)	94	JPN: 2,444		Sweetie (single)
"Muse"	2025	1	2	JPN: 4,670		Muse (single)
"This Is Me:I"	2025	—	36			Who I Am
"L&R"	2026	—	95			TBA
"Flower Road" (花咲く道, Hanasaku Michi)	2026	3	2			TBA

=== Music videos ===
List of music videos, showing year released, and name of the director(s)
Title	Year	Director(s)	Ref.
"Click"	2024	Woogie Kim (Mother Media)	
"Hi-Five"	2024	Naive Creative Production	
"Muse"	2025	Hasegawa Anderson (Digipedi)	
"This is Me:I"	2025		

== Filmography ==
List of television programs, with broadcast year, role and note
Year	Title		Role	Note	Ref.
Year	English	Original	Role	Note	Ref.
2024	Me:I no Yume Mitai!	ME:Iの夢みたい！	Themselves	Variety series	
2024	About Me:I	ABOUT ME:I	Themselves	Special	

== Awards and nominations ==
Name of the award ceremony, year presented, category, nominee of the award, and the result of the nomination
Award ceremony	Year	Category	Nominee / Work	Result	Ref.
Japan Gold Disc Award	2025	Best 5 New Artists (Japan)	Me:I	Won	
Japan Record Awards	2024	Newcomer Award	Me:I	Won	
Korea Grand Music Awards	2024	K-pop Global Rookie Award	Me:I	Won	
MAMA Awards	2024	Favorite New Asian Artist	Me:I	Won	
MTV Video Music Awards Japan	2025	Best New Artist Video (Japan)	"Click"	Won	
Music Awards Japan	2025	Best of Listeners' Choice: Japanese Song	"Click"	Nominated	

== Notes ==
Notes for albums and songs

Notes for peak chart positions
