= Issue (group) =

Japanese girl group

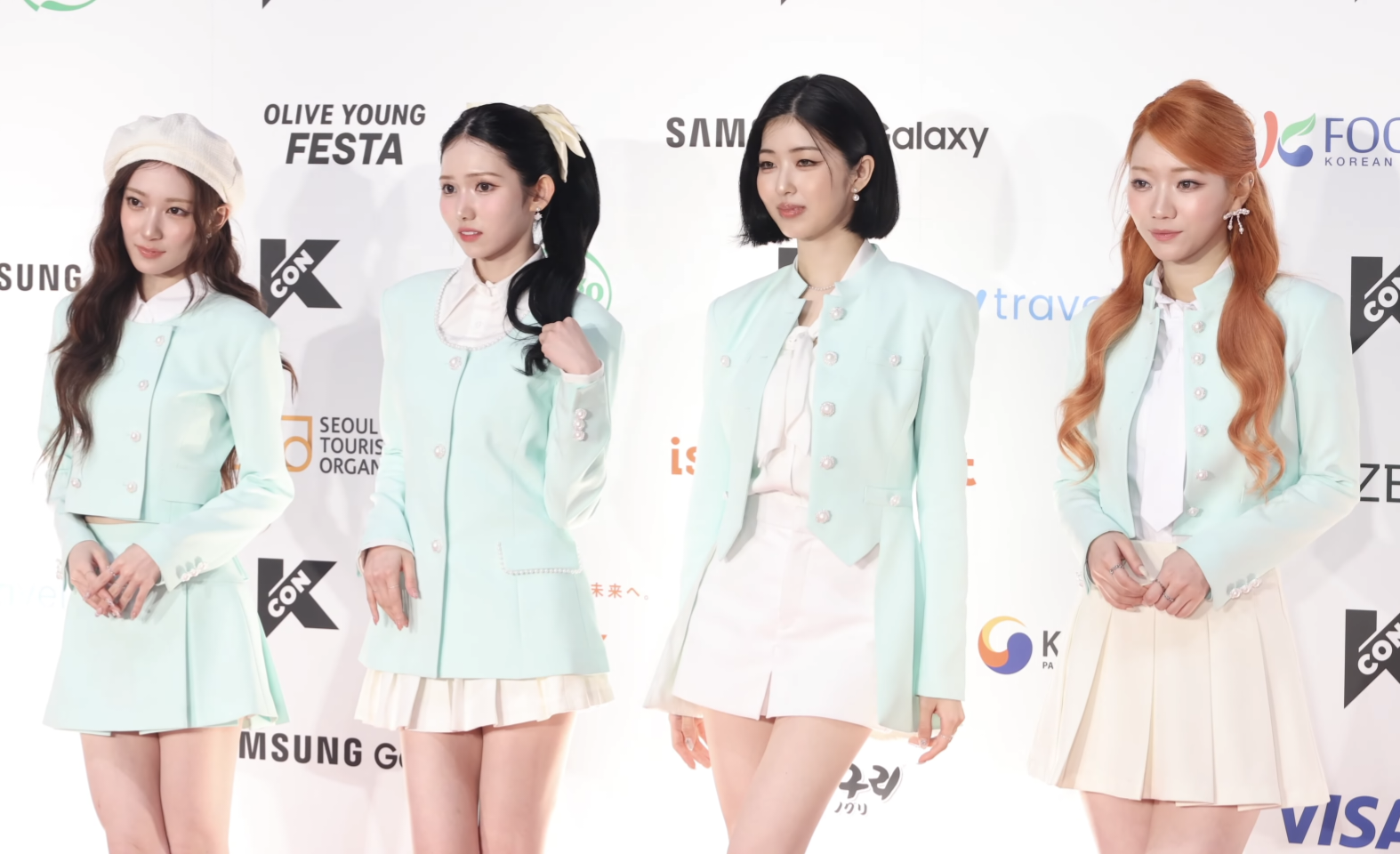
- Issue in May 2026

Background information
- Origin: Japan
- Genres: J-pop, K-pop
- Years active: 2024–present
- Label: Lapone Girls
- Members: Rin; Nano; Yuuki; Rino
- Website: is-sue.jp

Issue (Japanese: イッシュ, Hepburn: Isshu; stylized as IS:SUE) is a Japanese girl group consisting of former Produce 101 Japan The Girls contestants. The group is composed of four members: Rin, Nano, Yuuki, and Rino. They debuted with the single 1st Is:sue on June 19, 2024, the group is managed by Lapone Girls, a subsidiary of Lapone Entertainment.

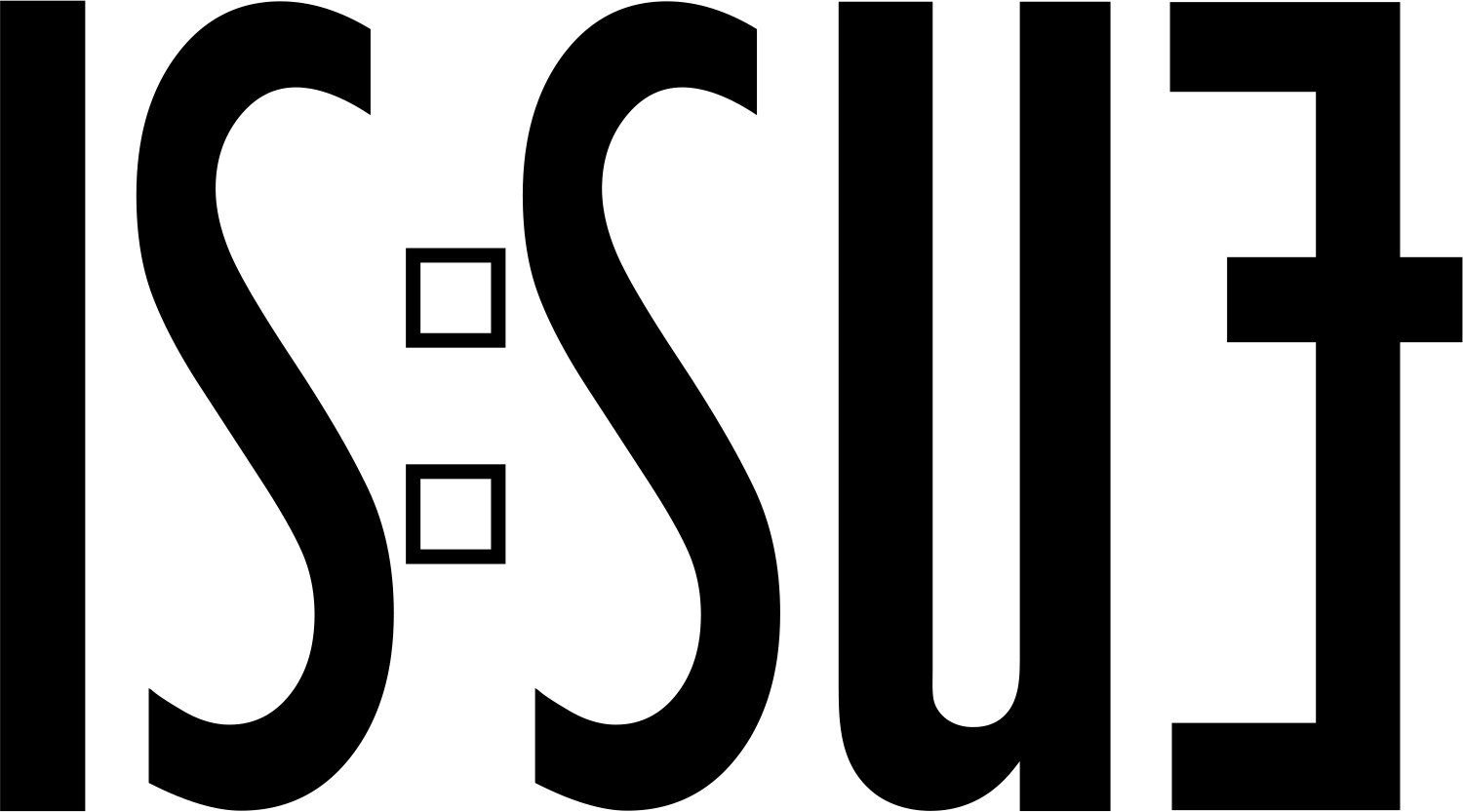
Official logo

== Members ==
- Rin
- Nano
- Yuuki
- Rino

== Discography ==
=== Singles ===
List of singles as lead artist, with selected chart positions and sales, showing year released, certification and album name
Title (Note: A maxi single release that has a different title from any songs in it will be considered as an "EP single" with its title being italicized. Its respective lead track is categorized under promotional single.)	Year	Peak chart positions		Certifications	Album
Title	Year	JPN	JPN Comb.	Certifications	Album
1st Is:sue	2024	1	1	RIAJ: Gold	Non-album singles
Welcome Strangers: 2nd Is:sue	2024	2	2		Non-album singles
Extreme Diamond: 3rd Is:sue	2025	4	4		Non-album singles
Phase	2026	2	3		Non-album singles
Coming Soon	2026	3	2		Non-album singles

=== Promotional singles ===
List of promotional singles, with selected chart positions, showing year released and album name
Title	Year	Peak chart positions	Album
Title	Year	JPN Hot	Album
"Connect"	2024	2	1st Is:sue (single)
"The Flash Girl"	2024	6	Welcome Strangers: 2nd Is:sue (single)
"Shining"	2025	9	Extreme Diamond: 3rd Is:sue (single)
"Phase"	2026	8	Phase (single)
"Quartet"	2026	—	Quartet
"New Look"	2026	9	Coming Soon (single)

== Awards and nominations ==
Name of the award ceremony, year presented, category, nominee of the award, and the result of the nomination
Award ceremony	Year	Category	Nominee / Work	Result	Ref.
Japan Gold Disc Award	2025	Best 5 New Artists (Japan)	Issue	Won	
