= Produce 101 Japan The Girls =

2023 Japanese reality competition show

- Season 3
- Title card
- Native name
- Katakana: プロデュース ワンオーワン ジャパン ザ ガールズ
Transcriptions
- Romanization: Purodyūsu Wanōwan Japan Za Gāruzu
- Presented by: Kaela Kimura
- Judges: Thelma Aoyama; Lee Hong-gi; Rino Nakasone; Yumeki; Ken the 390
- No. of contestants: 101
- Winner: Me:I
- Location: Japan
- No. of episodes: 11 + 1 special

Release
- Original network: Lemino; TBS (Finale only)
- Original release: October 5 – December 16, 2023

Season chronology
- ← Previous; Season 2 Next → Season 4 (Shinsekai)

Produce 101 Japan The Girls (プロデュース ワンオーワン ジャパン ザ ガールズ; stylized in all caps) is the third season of the reality competition show Produce 101 Japan, the Japanese version of Produce 101. The show brings together 101 contestants with the intention of producing a permanent eleven-member girl group.

The show premiered on October 5, 2023, and is broadcast on Lemino every Thursday at 21:00 JST (GMT+9). Each episode is rerun on YouTube with English subtitles the following Monday at 21:00 JST (GMT+9) and each episode will be available for a week before being switched to private and replaced with the next episode. Additionally, the final episode aired on TBS.

The top 11 winners debuted under the name Me:I in 2024.

== Promotion and broadcast ==
On April 20, 2023, it was announced that Produce 101 Japan would be renewed for a third season, this time featuring all female contestants. The show is being produced by NTT Docomo Studio & Live, Inc., a newly-formed joint venture between NTT Docomo and Yoshimoto Kogyo. The show is being exclusively distributed by NTT Docomo's streaming service Lemino, with exception of the final episode, which will also be broadcast by TBS. The episodes are receiving a limited overseas distribution with English subtitles through Produce 101 Japan's official YouTube channel, where they will stay available until a week after their release.

Applications were open from April 24 to May 24, 2023. Any female aspirants aged 15 and up who had no current ties to a talent agency and completed compulsory education were eligible. There were no restrictions regarding nationality or country of residence. Approximately 14,000 candidates applied, more than twice the amount as for the first season. Two rounds of auditions were held for successful applicants from June 3 to June 25, 2023. Individuals who passed the second round were allowed to participate in the show.

On September 2, 2023, this season's theme song "LEAP HIGH" (Japanese: LEAP HIGH〜明日へ、めいっぱい〜, Hepburn: LEAP HIGH～Asu e、meippai～; lit. 'LEAP HIGH～With all my might to tomorrow～') was released. The following day, the profiles of 96 out of the 101 contestants were revealed. The remaining five trainees had already withdrawn from the program and their identities were not disclosed. On September 26, a press conference was held with the contestants, trainers, National Producer Representative Kaela Kimura, the show's ambassador actress and former singer Nako Yabuki, and MC Moemi Kushiro.

== Cast ==
The show is being presented by singer Kaela Kimura as the National Producer Representative. Actress and former IZ*ONE and HKT48 member Nako Yabuki serves as the show's ambassador. Chanmina appeared as a guest on Episode 7 to mentor the trainees performing her song "Bijin" (美人). Former IZ*ONE members and soloists Choi Ye-na and Jo Yu-ri appeared as surprise guests on Episode 10 to give the trainees advice.

Vocal trainers

- Thelma Aoyama
- Lee Hong-gi

Dance trainers

- Rino Nakasone
- Yumeki

Rap trainer

- Ken the 390

== Contestants ==
Color key

Final debut members of Me:I
Contestants eliminated in the finale
Contestants eliminated in the third elimination round
Contestants eliminated in the second elimination round
Contestants eliminated in the first elimination round
Contestants left the show

101 Contestants
Momona Kasahara (笠原 桃奈)	Rinon Murakami (村上 璃杏)	Ayane Takami (高見 文寧)	Miu Sakurai (櫻井 美羽)	Suzu Yamamoto (山本 すず)
Kokona Sasaki (佐々木 心菜)	Shizuku Iida (飯田 栞月)	Keiko Shimizu (清水 恵子)	Ran Ishii (石井 蘭)	Tsuzumi Ebihara (海老原 鼓)
Kokoro Kato (加藤 心)	Rino Sakaguchi (坂口 梨乃)	Rin Aita (会田 凛)	Kagura Kato (加藤 神楽)	Yuuki Tanaka (田中 優希)
Nano Kenmotsu (釼持 菜乃)	Koto Tanaka (田中 琴)	Rio Kitazato (北里 理桜)	Haruka Sakuraba (桜庭 遥花)	Momoka Takabatake (髙畠 百加)
Serina Saito (斉藤 芹菜)	Joa Aramaki (荒牧 深愛)	Nagomi Abe (阿部 和)	Ayano Kamio (神尾 彩乃)	Yui Ando (安藤 佑唯)
Hina Takahashi (髙橋 妃那)	Tsukushi Sasaki (佐々木 つくし)	Sakura Kitazume (北爪 さくら)	Miyu Matsushita (松下 実夢)	Hana Yoshida (吉田 花夏)
Mena Hatta (八田 芽奈)	Yurara Sutani (須谷 緩)	Ranka Kawabata (川畑 蘭華)	Hazuki Hidaka (日髙 葉月)	Kokona Nakano (中野 心結)
Kotone Sakata (坂田 琴音)	Ayano Yoshida (吉田 彩乃)	Mana Koyama (小山 麻菜)	Rin Uchiyama (内山 凜)	Karen Otsubo (大坪 楓恋)
Ema Akiyama (秋山 愛)	Mayu Takagi (髙木 舞優)	Rimika Mizukami (水上 凜巳花)	Chiharu Ando (安藤 千陽)	Ayaka Fujimoto (藤本 彩花)
Mitsuki Yamazaki (山崎 美月)	Miyu Kanno (菅野 美優)	Kotone Nakamori (中森 琴音)	Sakura Sudo (須藤 紗暮)	Mikoto Nakamori (中森 美琴)
Misaki Yamaguchi (山口 愛咲)	Shion Mogi (茂木 詩音)	Aruha Oda (小田 有葉)	Miyu Watanabe (渡辺 未優)	Honoka Kurokawa (黒川 穂香)
Rio Oikawa (及川 里桜)	Rena Suzuki (鈴木 玲名)	Moe Kamada (鎌田 萌)	Kano Kurihara (栗原 果乃)	Fuka Bando (坂東 楓夏)
Aki Kikukawa (菊川 亜樹)	Aiko Hamasaki (濵嵜 愛子)	Mimi Ueki (植木 美々)	Nana Tabata (田端 那菜)	Ayaka Hosoi (細井 彩加)
Karin Tanabe (田邊 果凜)	Nana Okamura (岡村 菜那)	Maho Shiromaru (城丸 真歩)	Nonoka Okabe (岡部 望々花)	Hana Tanaka (田中 花)
Hana Iyota (井餘田 華)	Mihaya Wakimoto (脇本 美颯)	Emi Oyanagi (小栁 絵美)	Anon Moro (茂呂 空音)	Mei Shibuya (渋谷 芽衣)
Aoi Nakamura (中村 葵)	Runa Kawagishi (川岸 瑠那)	Honoka Nakayama (中山 穗乃楓)	Ameli Sato (佐藤 あめり)	Konomi Kato (加藤 好実)
Yuka Aoki (青木 友香)	Rio Kataoka (片岡 陽音)	Rikako Sekiguchi (関口 理香子)	Riko Kino (木野 稟子)	Mika Shinzawa (新澤 実華)
Miu Tabuchi (田淵 美優)	Meika Motohashi (本橋 明桜)	Natsuho Sugai (菅井 夏帆)	Riro Nakamura (中村 璃彩)	Sara Ota (太田 紗蘭)
Airi Kato (加藤 愛梨)	Jueri Sano (佐野 じゅえり)	Sayaka Furuhashi (古橋 沙也佳)	Seia Tani (谷 聖彩)	Sae Kobayashi (小林 さえ)
Arisa Shibagaki (柴垣 有佐)	Yuna Andoh (安藤 ゆうな)	Niko Gogami (後上 仁胡)	Ameri Shiratori (白取 天莉)	Unknown
Unknown				

== Rankings ==
=== Top 11 ===
The top 11 contestants are chosen through popularity online voting through the Produce 101 Japan voting page on Lemino's website and audience live voting. Furthermore, National Producers can receive an additional vote per day by downloading the Lemino app. The results were shown at the end of each episode.

New Top 11 (Note: Indicates contestants who had never placed in the Top 11 in any prior elimination rounds or ranking announcements.)
Comeback to Top 11

#	Episode 2	Episode 3	Episode 5	Episode 6	Episode 8	Episode 10	Episode 11
1	Suzu Yamamoto	Kokoro Kato (▲1)	Momona Kasahara (▲1)	Ran Ishii (▲2)	Ran Ishii	Momona Kasahara (▲2)	Momona Kasahara
2	Kokoro Kato	Momona Kasahara (▲2)	Kokoro Kato (▼1)	Kokoro Kato	Kokoro Kato	Miu Sakurai (▲2)	Rinon Murakami (▲1)
3	Tsuzumi Ebihara	Suzu Yamamoto (▼2)	Ran Ishii (▲4)	Momona Kasahara (▼2)	Momona Kasahara	Rinon Murakami (▲14)	Ayane Takami (▲2)
4	Momona Kasahara	Miu Sakurai (▲1)	Miu Sakurai	Miu Sakurai	Miu Sakurai	Ran Ishii (▼3)	Miu Sakurai (▼2)
5	Miu Sakurai	Tsuzumi Ebihara (▼2)	Suzu Yamamoto (▼2)	Suzu Yamamoto	Suzu Yamamoto	Ayane Takami (▲1)	Suzu Yamamoto (▲9)
6	Kokona Sasaki	Kokona Sasaki	Tsuzumi Ebihara (▼1)	Nano Kenmotsu (▲2)	Ayane Takami (▲2)	Tsuzumi Ebihara (▲1)	Kokona Sasaki (▲1)
7	Ran Ishii	Ran Ishii	Kokona Sasaki (▼1)	Rin Aita (▲4)	Tsuzumi Ebihara (▲2)	Kokona Sasaki (▲4)	Shizuku Iida (▲3)
8	Rio Kitazato	Nano Kenmotsu (▲6)	Nano Kenmotsu	Ayane Takami (▲1)	Keiko Shimizu (▲3)	Kokoro Kato (▼6)	Keiko Shimizu (▲3)
9	Ayane Takami	Koto Tanaka (▲4)	Ayane Takami (▲1)	Tzusumi Ebihara (▼3)	Nano Kenmotsu (▼3)	Rin Aita (▲1)	Ran Ishii (▼5)
10	Kagura Kato	Ayane Takami (▼1)	Koto Tanaka (▼1)	Kokona Sasaki (▼3)	Rin Aita (▼3)	Shizuku Iida (▲10)	Tsuzumi Ebihara (▼4)
11	Sakura Kitazume	Rio Kitazato (▼3)	Rin Aita (▲24)	Keiko Shimizu (▲1)	Kokona Sasaki (▼1)	Keiko Shimizu (▼3)	Kokoro Kato (▼3)

=== First voting period ===
The first voting period took place from October 5, 2023, at 21:00 JST (GMT+9), to October 26 at 23:59 JST. National Producers were allowed to vote for eleven girls a day. Eliminations were based on individual total points. In total, 34,141,349 votes were cast for the 1st Ranking Announcement Ceremony.

1st Voting Period results
Rank	Episode 2 (Online votes)	Episode 3 (Online votes)	Episode 4 (Audience live votes)		Episode 5 (Total votes)	
Rank	Episode 2 (Online votes)	Episode 3 (Online votes)	Name	Votes	Name	Votes
1	Suzu Yamamoto	Kokoro Kato	Tsuzumi Ebihara	3,172	Momona Kasahara	1,768,859
2	Kokoro Kato	Momona Kasahara	Ayane Takami	3,151	Kokoro Kato	1,746,344
3	Tsuzumi Ebihara	Suzu Yamamoto	Sakura Kitazume	3,139	Ran Ishii	1,694,183
4	Momona Kasahara	Miu Sakurai	Ran Ishii	3,123	Miu Sakurai	1,592,191
5	Miu Sakurai	Tsuzumi Ebihara	Momona Kasahara	3,093	Suzu Yamamoto	1,572,508
6	Kokona Sasaki	Kokona Sasaki	Tsukushi Sasaki; Kokona Nakano	3,084 (Note: Tsukushi Sasaki and Kokona Nakano both ranked 6th during the live audience voting as they both received a total of 84 votes. Hence why there is no 7th place.)	Tsuzumi Ebihara	1,429,741
7	Ran Ishii	Ran Ishii	—N/a	—N/a	Kokona Sasaki	1,414,136
8	Rio Kitazato	Nano Kenmotsu	Hina Takahashi	3,082	Nano Kenmotsu	1,305,332
9	Ayane Takami	Koto Tanaka	Momoka Takabatake	3,073	Ayane Takami	1,076,012
10	Kagura Kato	Ayane Takami	Yuka Aoki	3,071	Koto Tanaka	980,811
11	Sakura Kitazume	Rio Kitazato	Honoka Nakayama	3,068	Rin Aita	916,711

=== Second voting period ===
The second voting period has started on November 2, 2023, after the broadcast for Episode 5 had finished, and will end on November 16 at 23:59 JST (GMT+9). National Producers can vote for eleven girls a day. Eliminations are based on individual total points.

In Episode 6, only the names, not the ranks of the top 11 contestants were shown. The top 11 for the episode included Rin Aita, Ran Ishii, Tsuzumi Ebihara, Momona Kasahara, Kokoro Kato, Nano Kenmotsu, Miu Sakurai, Kokona Sasaki, Keiko Shimizu, Ayane Takami, and Suzu Yamamoto. The results of Episode 6 were shown in Episode 8.

#	Episode 7 (Audience live votes)		Episode 6 (Note: In Episode 6, only the names, not the ranks of the top 11 contestants were shown. The ranks revealed in Episode 8.) (Online votes)	Episode 8 (Total votes)	
#	Name	Votes	Episode 6 (Online votes)	Name	Votes
1	Ran Ishii	110,509	Ran Ishii	Ran Ishii	2,449,217
2	Momoka Takabatake	110,492	Kokoro Kato	Kokoro Kato	2,130,005
3	Keiko Shimizu	110,479	Momona Kasahara	Momona Kasahara	1,985,944
4	Rino Sakaguchi	10,489	Miu Sakurai	Miu Sakurai	1,963,368
5	Yui Ando	10,479	Suzu Yamamoto	Suzu Yamamoto	1,719,091
6	Momona Kasahara	10,473	Nano Kenmotsu	Ayane Takami	1,616,533
7	Hina Takahashi	10,470	Rin Aita	Tsuzumi Ebihara	1,599,394
8	Ranka Kawabata	10,467	Ayane Takami	Keiko Shimizu	1,513,323
9	Nano Kenmotsu	10,462	Tsuzumi Ebihara	Nano Kenmotsu	1,463,867
10	Nagomi Abe	477	Kokona Sasaki	Rin Aita	1,439,966
11	Tsuzumi Ebihara; Ayane Takami	475 (Note: Tsuzumi Ebihara and Ayane Takami both received 475 votes and therefore both ranked 11th.)	Keiko Shimizu	Kokona Sasaki	1,435,067

=== Third voting period ===
The third voting period took place from November 23, 2023, after the broadcast for Episode 8 had finished, and will end on November 30 at 23:59 JST (GMT+9). National Producers can vote for two girls a day. Eliminations are based on individual total points.

Between Episodes 8 and 9, an interim ranking was published alongside a preview video of the Concept Evaluation performances, revealing the current ranking for six trainees. Ayano Kamio ranked 26th, Kagura Kato ranked 25th, Joa Aramaki ranked 24th, Serina Saito ranked 23rd, Yuuki Tanaka ranked 18th, and Nano Kenmotsu ranked 17th.

#	Episode 9 (Audience live votes)		Episode 10 (Total votes)	
#	Name	Votes	Name	Votes
1	Tsuzumi Ebihara	100,036	Momona Kasahara	650,828
2	Miu Sakurai	50,035	Miu Sakurai	481,838
3	Momona Kasahara	40,032	Rinon Murakami	481,635
4	Kokoro Kato; Suzu Yamamoto	25,018	Ran Ishii	400,320
5	—N/a (Note: Kokoro Kato and Suzu Yamamoto both ranked 4th, hence why there is no 5th place.)	—N/a	Ayane Takami	396,945
6	Rin Aita	10,007	Tsuzumi Ebihara	371,393
7	Ayane Takami	36	Kokona Sasaki	341,153
8	Ran Ishii	35	Kokoro Kato	292,933
9	Yuuki Tanaka	27	Rin Aita	283,766
10	Sakura Kitazume	24	Shizuku Iida	273,263
11	Kokona Sasaki	22	Keiko Shimizu	265,607

=== Result ===
#	Episode 11 (Total votes)			
#	Name	Votes	Prefecture	Audition Name
1	Momona Kasahara	1,116,716	Kanagawa	rebloom
2	Rinon Murakami	700,305	Okayama	Vitamin Bomb
3	Ayane Takami	686,868	Iwate	Cool Girls
4	Miu Sakurai	655,210	Aichi	Wing Bell Moon
5	Suzu Yamamoto	631,708	Tokyo	Wing Bell Moon
6	Kokona Sasaki	599,913	Mie	Team NANA
7	Shizuku Iida	593,457	Tokyo	Little Heroines
8	Keiko Shimizu	591,650	Aichi	Vitamin Bomb
9	Ran Ishii	588,173	Saitama	EYE Catcher
10	Tsuzumi Ebihara	577,903	Kanagawa	Blue Spring
11	Kokoro Kato	552,603	Aichi	rebloom

== Episodes ==
No.	Title	Original release date
1	"First Meeting of the 101 Trainees & Level Placement Test"; Transliteration: "Renshūsei Hyaku-ichi-nin Hatsugao Awase Ando Reberu Wake Tesuto" (Japanese: 練習生101人 初顔合わせ & レベル分けテスト)	October 5, 2023
The episode begins with the audition teams entering the venue one by one. The contestants then choose the seat with the rank they expect to place and afterward, it is revealed how the other trainees have ranked their skills. Then, the National Representative, Kaela Kimura and the trainers enter and the first evaluation round, the "Level Placement Test", begins. Each team has prepared a performance that is judged by the trainers. The contestants are evaluated individually and assigned a grade from A to F accordingly. The episode ends with the "rebloom" team about to perform.
2	"Level Placement Test & Re-evaluation Test"; Transliteration: "Reberu Wake Tesuto Ando Saihyōka Tesuto" (Japanese: レベル分けテスト & 再評価テスト)	October 12, 2023
The "Level Placement Test" continues and the final twelve teams perform. After all the contestants have received their grades, they begin training for their next mission: the "Re-evaluation Test". Contestants are grouped together by grade and learn the choreography and lyrics to the theme song "LEAP HIGH" under the trainers' instruction. After practice has ended, each contestant performs the song in front of the trainers, who will then decide whether they will re-assign them a new grade or keep the original one.
3	"Level Placement Re-evaluation & Group Battle"; Transliteration: "Reberu Wake Saihyōka Ando Gurūpu Hyōka" (Japanese: レベル分け再評価 & グループ評価)	October 19, 2023
Each of the contestants receives a card with their new grade. After opening it, they join their newly assigned class and keep practicing for the theme song stage. Then, everyone from A class gets a chance to audition for the center position and solo parts, and the remaining contestants vote for the trainee they think is most suitable. Additionally, the A class trainees will compete for three solo parts. Suzu Yamamoto, Tsuzumi Ebihara, and Rino Sakaguchi are announced as the winners for the solo parts, while Miu Sakurai and Ran Ishii are announced as the finalists for the center position. Sakurai eventually secures the spot and the theme song stage is recorded with her at the center. Afterwards, the next test is announced: the "Group Battle". The member who gets to choose her team first is selected through a lottery and Ishii is chosen to go first. Once almost all the contestants have joined a team, it is announced that center Sakurai gets to "steal" members of other teams for her own one. This leads to a reshuffle of the teams as slots for "stolen" members have to be filled again. The teams then decide which songs they want to perform for the next evaluation and the stages commence, starting with the first "How You Like That" team.
4	"Group Battle Second Half"; Transliteration: "Gurūpu Batoru Kōhansen" (Japanese: グループバトル後半戦)	October 26, 2023
The remaining teams for the Group Battle perform, starting with the second "Hype Boy" team. After all performances have concluded, it is revealed that the second "Body & Soul" team has scored the highest out of all during the live audience vote. Additionally, each member of every winning team will receive an additional 3,000 votes on top of their live audience votes. With the benefit, Tsuzumi Ebihara places first during the ranking announcement. Takami Ayane and Sakura Kitazume rank second and third, respectively. The rest of the top eleven spots are filled by Ran Ishii, Momona Kasahara, Tsukushi Sasaki, Kokona Nakano, Hina Takahashi, Momoka Takabatake, Yuka Aoki, and Honoka Nakayama.
5	"1st Ranking Announcement Ceremony"; Transliteration: "Dai-ikkai Jun-i Happyō-shiki" (Japanese: 第1回順位発表式)	November 2, 2023
Trainees ranked 49th to 12th are announced before the Top 11 are revealed, starting from the bottom. Aita Rin ranks 11th, having risen 24 spots since the previous rankings. Tanaka Koto, Takami Ayane, Kenmotsu Nano, Sasaki Kokona, Ebihara Tsuzumi, Yamamoto Suzu, Miu Sakurai, and Ishii Ran are announced for the ranks 10 to 3, respectively. Finally, the top two candidates for first place are unveiled: Kasahara Momona and Kato Kokoro. Kasahara Momona ultimately secures the top rank with 1,768,859 votes, while Kato Kokoro follows with 1,746,344 votes. Lastly, Otsubo Karen manages to place 50th and therefore remains in the competition. The episode ends with a preview of the next evaluation, called the "Position Battle".
6	"Position Battle First Half"; Transliteration: "Pojishon Batoru Zenhan" (Japanese: ポジションバトル前半)	November 9, 2023
The trainees gather in the auditorium and the show's ambassador Nako Yabuki reveals and explains the second mission. The Position Battle starts and each contestant has to choose one of the ten songs divided into the three categories "Vocal", "Dance", and "Rap & Vocal". The winner from each performance in the vocal, dance, and rap positions will receive 10,000 votes while the winner among all songs of each category will receive an additional 100,000 votes. It is also revealed that the Dance song "Run Run" by PROWDMON and LAS is a Double Mission where both bonuses are doubled only if the team places first in the category; otherwise the team will have their votes reset to zero. The performances begin, with the "Wa Da Da" team performing first and ending with the "Shine A Light" team.
7	"Position Battle Second Half"; Transliteration: "Pojishon Batoru Kōhansen" (Japanese: ポジションバトル後半戦)	November 16, 2023
The remaining performances for the Position Battle are revealed. Then the winning trainees for each category is announced: Momoka Takabatake from "Omokage" team places first in Vocal category, Ran Ishii from "Rocketeer" team places first in Dance category, and Keiko Shimizu from "Bijin" team places first in the Rap & Vocal category, each securing an additional 100,000 votes. It is also revealed that since the "Run Run" team was unable to place first in Dance, all members will have their votes reset to zero.
8	"2nd Ranking Announcement Ceremony"; Transliteration: "Dai-ni-kai Rankingu Happyō-shiki" (Japanese: 第2回ランキング発表式)	November 23, 2023
Kaela Kimura explains the third mission, the "Concept Evaluation", to the trainees. Trainees are assigned to one of five songs based on audience votes between the broadcasts of episodes 5 and 6, but only those who survive the second elimination will be able to perform them. The winning team will receive an additional 250,000 votes that is split among each trainee by ranking: first place will receive 100,000 votes, second place will receive 50,000 votes, third place will receive 40,000 votes, fourth place will receive 30,000 votes, fifth place will receive 20,000 votes, sixth place will receive 10,000 votes, and seventh place will receive 0 votes. Then, the 2nd Ranking Announcement Ceremony begins. First, the trainees ranked 34th to 12th are announced before the Top 11 are revealed. Kokona Sasaki ranks 11th, followed by Rin Aita, Nano Kenmotsu, Keiko Shimizu, Tsuzumi Ebihara, Ayane Takami, and Suzu Yamamoto for the ranks 10 to 5. Finally, the top four candidates for first place and their total votes are unveiled: Ran Ishii, Momona Kasahara, Kokoro Kato, and Miu Sakurai. Miu Sakurai ranks 4th with 1,963,368 votes, Momona Kasahara ranks 3rd with 1,982,944 votes, Kokoro Kato ranks 2nd with 2,130,005 votes, and Ran Ishii ultimately secures the top rank with 2,449,217 votes. Lastly, Hana Yoshida manages to place 35th and therefore remains in the competition.
9	"Concept Battle Evaluation"; Transliteration: "Konseputo batoru no hyōka" (Japanese: コンセプトバトルの評価)	November 30, 2023
After the 2nd Ranking Announcement Ceremony, the teams must be reorganized due to an uneven distribution of members. Teams with more than seven members must vote on who stays, with those being removed joining a team with less than seven members. This episode shows the live performances for all five concept evaluations. Then the rankings for each team and trainee are revealed. "Popcorn" team places fifth with 59 votes, "AtoZ" and "小悪魔(Baddie)" tie for third with 67 votes each, "TOXIC" places second with 143 votes, and "&ME" places first with 152 votes. Within the "&ME" team, Tsuzumi Ebihara places first and earns 100,000 votes, Miu Sakurai places second and earns 50,000 votes, Momona Kasahara places third and earns 40,000 votes, Kokoro Kato and Suzu Yamamoto tie for fourth and earn 25,000 votes each, Rin Aita places sixth and earns 10,000 votes, and Koto Tanaka ranks seventh and earns 0 votes.
10	"3rd Ranking Announcement Ceremony"; Transliteration: "Dai-san-kai Rankingu Happyō-shiki" (Japanese: 第3回ランキング発表式)	December 7, 2023
The 3rd Ranking Announcement Ceremony begins where it is revealed that only the top 20 trainees will remain. First, the trainees ranked 19th to 12th are announced before the Top 11 are revealed. Keiko Shimizu ranks 11th, followed by Shizuku Iida, Rin Aita, Kokoro Kato, Kokona Sasaki, Tsuzumi Ebihara, and Ayane Takami for the ranks 10 to 5. Finally, the top four candidates for first place are unveiled: Ran Ishii, Momona Kasahara, Miu Sakurai, and Rinon Murakami. Ran Ishii ranks 4th with 400,320 votes, Rinon Murakami ranks 3rd with 481,635 votes, Miu Sakurai ranks 2nd with 481,838 votes, and Momona Kasahara ultimately secures the top rank with 650,828 votes. Lastly, Kagura Kato manages to place 20th and therefore remains in the competition. Kaela Kimura then explains the final mission to the trainees: the "Debut Evaluation". The trainees must choose to perform either "想像以上" (Beyond your imagination) or "CHOPPY CHOPPY", along with their desired position. The order begins with rank 20 up to 1, giving higher-ranked trainees the advantage of stealing other trainees' positions and moving them to a different position. After positions are confirmed, the trainees begin practicing in preparation for the final stage. The trainees also practice for their final ballad, "FLY UP SO HIGH", written by Kaela Kimura since the 1st Ranking Announcement Ceremony.
11	TBA	December 16, 2023

== Discography ==
=== Studio albums ===
Title	Details	Peak chart positions			Sales
Title	Details	JPN	JPN Comb.	JPN Hot	Sales
Produce 101 Japan The Girls	Released: December 18, 2023 (Note: CD was released on February 7, 2024); Label: Lapone; Formats: CD, digital download	2	2	3	JPN: 68,749 (Note: Japanese total sales of Produce 101 Japan The Girls as of September 2024)

=== Extended plays ===
Title	Details	Peak chart positions		Sales
Title	Details	JPN Comb.	JPN Hot	Sales
35 Girls 5 Concepts	Released: December 1, 2023; Label: Lapone; Formats: Digital download, streaming	9	17	JPN: 1,739
Final	Released: December 17, 2023; Label: Lapone; Formats: Digital download, streaming	— (Note: Final did not enter the Combined Albums Chart, but appeared at number 4 on the Combined Singles Chart.)	—	
"—" denotes releases that did not chart or were not released in that region.

=== Singles ===
Title	Year	Peaks		Certifications	Album
Title	Year	JPN Comb.	JPN Hot	Certifications	Album
"Leap High!"	2023	46	49	RIAJ: Gold (st.)	Produce 101 Japan The Girls
"AtoZ"	2023	28	27		Produce 101 Japan The Girls
"Baddie"	2023	—	56		Produce 101 Japan The Girls
"Popcorn"	2023	—	53		Produce 101 Japan The Girls
"Toxic"	2023	18	18		Produce 101 Japan The Girls
"&Me"	2023	15	19		Produce 101 Japan The Girls
"Choppy Choppy"	2023	— (Note: "Choppy Choppy" did not enter the Combined Singles Chart, but appeared at number 50 on the download component chart.)	37		Produce 101 Japan The Girls
"Sōzōijō"	2023	— (Note: "Sōzōijō" did not enter the Combined Singles Chart, but appeared at number 48 on the download component chart.)	32		Produce 101 Japan The Girls
"Fly Up So High	2023	—	75		Produce 101 Japan The Girls
"—" denotes releases that did not chart or were not released in that region.

== Post-Competition ==
- Me:I released their debut single "Mirai" on April 17, 2024.
  - Kokona Sasaki (6th), Shizuku Iida (7th), Ran Ishii (9th), and Kokoro Kato (11th) left the group on December 31, 2025, after terminating their contracts.
Other contestants, other activities
- Some trainees formed/joined groups:
  - Rino Sakaguchi (12th), Rin Aita (13th), Yuuki Tanaka (15th), and Nano Kenmotsu (16th) signed with Lapone Entertainment as trainees and were revealed in March 2024; it was then announced that the girls will debut as Is:sue under Lapone Girls and will have their debut performance at KCON Japan. Is:sue debuted with their first single "1st Is:sue", on June 19, 2024.
  - Koto Tanaka (17th) and Yui Ando (25th) debuted in new girl group MYERA with their first single "Lie Lie Lie Lie / Be Naked", on January 1, 2025.
  - Haruka Sakuraba (19th) signed with ASOBISYSTEM and was revealed as a member of Kawaii Lab.'s girl group Cutie Street in July 2024. Cutie Street debuted with their first single "Kawaii Dake ja Dame Desu ka?", on November 13, 2024.
  - Serina Saito (21st) and Nagomi Abe (23rd) signed with 143 Entertainment as trainees and were revealed in May 2024; the girls debuted in Madein with their first mini album Rise, on September 3, 2024.
  - Joa Aramaki (22nd) signed with Pony Canyon and was revealed as a member of the girl group UN1CON in August 2024. UN1CON debuted with their first single “A.R.T.”, on October 30, 2024.
  - Ayano Kamio (24th) and Hana Yoshida (30th) signed with NTT Docomo Studio & Live and debuted in new girl group Cosmosy with their first single "zigy=zigy~", on December 31, 2024.
  - Hina Takahashi (26th) and Rin Uchiyama (39th) signed with POPROD Production on July 29, 2024, followed by Karin Tanabe (66th) on November 1, 2024. They debuted in new girl group RealRomantic with their first EP "Blooming" on April 16, 2025.
  - Sakura Kitazume (28th), Ayaka Hosoi (65th) and Nonoka Okabe (69th) signed with SOENSHA and formed new girl group RIRYDAY with their self-titled pre-debut single, on September 6, 2024.
    - RIRYDAY went on indefinite hiatus on September 13, 2025.
  - Rimika Mizukami (43rd) signed with Imaginate and was revealed as a member of Heroines under the unit Full Course in February 2026.
  - Chiharu Ando (44th) and Shion Mogi (52nd) were revealed as members of the girl group Ettone. Ettone debuted with their first single "U+U" on September 10, 2025.
  - Ayaka Fujimoto (45th) and Honoka Kurokawa (55th) signed with SOENSHA and formed new girl group VIGU with their stage debut on October 17, 2024.
    - VIGU went on indefinite hiatus on April 15, 2025.
  - Miyu Kanno (47th), Aruha Oda (53rd), and Hana Iyota (71st) were revealed as members of Nü FEEL under CURE LAND PROJECT. Nü FEEL debuted with their first single "KIRA KAWAII" on December 10, 2025.
    - Miyu left the group on November 1, 2025.
  - Moe Kamada (58th) was revealed as a member of the new girl group Pixel Ribbon (under the name Kurosaki Moe) in February 2025.
  - Fuka Bando (60th) signed with Flap Entertainment and was revealed as a member of SugarNote in February 2026. The group is scheduled to debut on June 6, 2026.
  - Runa Kawagishi (77th) was revealed as a member of Kawaii Lab.'s girl group Fav me on February 14, 2025.
  - Honoka Nakayama (78th), Ameli Sato (79th) and Sae Kobayashi (95th) signed with BUZZ PRODUCTION and debuted in new girl group Hyperstella, which was renamed to Neo Stella on April 2, 2025.
    - Ameli and Sae left the group in February 2025.
  - Sayaka Furuhashi was revealed as a member of Be Girls.
- Some trainees signed with labels:
  - Ema Akiyama (41st) signed with Twin Planet.
  - Nana Tabata (64th) signed with WakeOne.
  - Runa Kawagishi (77th) and Konomi Kato (80th) signed with ASOBISYSTEM as trainees and were revealed as members of Kawaii Lab.'s trainee group Kawaii Lab. Mates on September 8, 2024. Aiko Hamasaki (62nd) also joined the label and was revealed as a member of the trainee group Kawaii Lab. South on October 11, 2025.
    - Runa graduated from the group on February 22, 2025, after it was revealed that she would debut in fav me.
- Some trainees left the idol industry or entered new careers in the acting/entertainment industry:
  - Kotone Sakata (36th) signed with Trapeziste as a model.
  - Rimika Mizukami (43rd) signed with N.D. Promotion as a model on October 1, 2024, until her departure in February 2026.
  - Mitsuki Yamazaki (46th) signed with Muku as an actress.
  - Sakura Sudo (49th) appeared in the live-action film adaptation of Koi o Shiranai Bokutachi wa, which premiered on August 23, 2024.
- Some trainees participated in other survival shows:
  - Rio Kitazato (18th), Yurara Sutani (32nd), and Riko Kino (84th) participated in TBS's SEVEN COLORS -girls life memory-, which premiered on October 2, 2024. Riko was eliminated in the final round, while Rio and Yurara passed the final round and debuted in the winning group Moxymill under NTT Docomo Studio & Live.
  - Momoka Takabatake (20th), Kokona Nakano (35th), and Sayaka Furuhashi (93rd) participated in BMSG's No No Girls, which premiered on October 4, 2024. Sayaka was eliminated in the 5th round while Nakano was eliminated in the final round. Momoka passed the final round and debuted in the winning group Hana under B-RAVE. Hana released their debut single "Rose" on April 23, 2025.
  - Sakura Kitazume (28th), Ranka Kawabata (33rd), and Honoka Kurokawa (55th) are participating in Abema's World Scout: The Final Piece, which premiered on February 24, 2026. Sakura and Ranka withdrew prior to the show's premiere.
  - Karen Otsubo (40th) and Mimi Ueki (63rd) participated in the audition show Produce Quest, which premiered on August 5, 2025. Both passed the final round and debuted in the girl group Lv. Charm under Pluster on April 10, 2026.
  - Ayaka Fujimoto (45th), Fuka Bando (60th), and Emi Oyanagi (73rd) participated in the audition show Black & White, which premiered on June 27, 2025. Ayaka withdrew prior to the show's premiere due to visa procedures in South Korea, while Fuka ranked 10th-16th and was eliminated in the final round. Emi ranked 9th debuted in the "White" themed group MilMoon under VOLVE CREATIVE. MilMoon released their pre-debut single "Wrinkle Wink" on November 5, 2025.
  - Nana Tabata (64th) participated in Mnet's I-Land 2: N/a, which premiered on April 18, 2024. She was eliminated in the show's fifth episode.
  - Hana Iyota (71st) participated in Fuji TV's ≠ME Nanashi no Cinderella, which premiered on October 5, 2026.
