= Sparkling Moon / Good Luck My Future =

Single by Gang Parade

from the album Gang Rise
- Released: December 25, 2024
- Genre: J-pop
- Length: 8:57
- Label: Fueled by Mentaiko

Gang Parade singles chronology
"Peace – Chō Panic / Itsuka" (2024)	"Sparkling Moon / Good Luck My Future" (2024)

"Sparkling Moon / Good Luck My Future" (Sparkling Moon/グッドラック・マイフューチャー) is the seventh major single by the Japanese girl group Gang Parade, released on December 25, 2024, by Fueled by Mentaiko. The single topped the Oricon Singles Chart.

== Track listing ==
CD single
No.	Title	Lyrics	Music	Length
1.	"Gang Parade Se" (11Soul ver.)		Ichiro Iguchi	1:01
2.	"Sparkling Moon"	Insomnia	Insomnia	3:38
3.	"Good Luck My Future" (グッドラック・マイフューチャー)	Kayoko Kusano	Kayoko Kusano	4:17
Total length:				8:57

== Charts ==
Weekly chart performance for "Sparkling Moon" / "Good Luck My Future"
Chart (2024)	Peak position
Japan (Japan Hot 100) "Sparkling Moon"	18
Japan (Oricon)	1
Japan Combined Singles (Oricon)	4
