= Gang Parade =

Japanese idol group

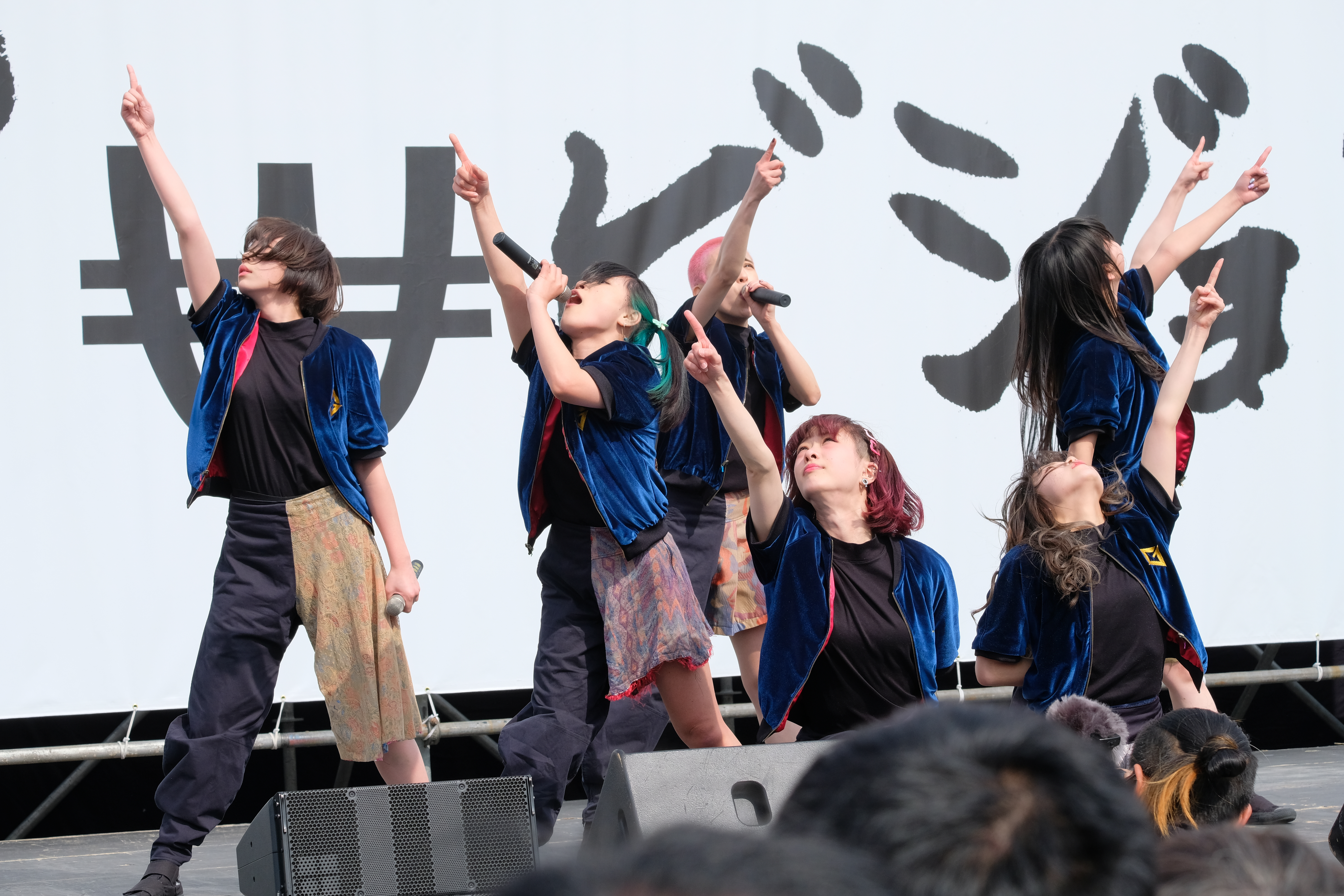
- Gang Parade during the WACK Exhibition 2017

Background information
- Also known as: Pla2me, POP
- Origin: Tokyo, Japan
- Genre: J-pop
- Years active: 2014–2026
- Labels: WACK; T-Palette Records; Fueled By Mentaiko
- Spinoffs: Go to the Beds, Paradises, Kiss Kiss
- Past members: Miki Yamamachi; Yua Yumeno; Can GP Maika; Coco Partin Coco; Yui Ga Dockson; Usagi Tsukino; Naruhaworld; Kila May; Ca Non; Changbaby; Ainastar; Mari Mizuta; Ao Shigusawa; Maaya Inukai; Aya Eightprince; Haruna Bad Chiiiin; Saki Kamiya; Potential; Yuka Terashima
- Website: gangparade.jp

Gang Parade (ギャングパレード), stylized as GANG PARADE (formerly known as Pla2me (プラニメ) and POP (ピオピ)) was a Japanese alternative idol girl group formed in 2014. In 2020, Gang Parade split into two groups: Go to the Beds and Paradises. They resumed activities in 2022. The group disbanded in October 2026.

== History ==
=== 2014–2015: Debut as Pla2me, reformation as POP ===
On September 30, 2014, the duo Pla2me consisting of members Saki Kamiya and Mari Mizuta debuted under T-Palette Records with the single "Plastic 2 Mercy". They released their second single, "Unit", on January 6, 2015. On April 1, Mari Mizuta withdrew from Pla2me due to "difference in opinion".

On June 1, 2015, Pla2me changed their name to POP (Period Of Plastic 2 Mercy) and four new members: Miki Yamamachi, Yua Yumeno, Ao Shigusawa and Maaya Inukai, joined the group. The group released their first album, P.O.P, on August 4. Their first single as POP, "Happy Lucky Kirakira Lucky", was released on December 8.

=== 2016: Rename to Gang Parade ===
The group's fourth single overall, "Queen of POP", was released on March 15, 2016.

On June 17, POP changed their name to Gang Parade. They released their first single as Gang Parade, "We Are the Idol", on July 19. On July 20, Ao Shigusawa withdrew from the group as her family did not support her musical career. In October, Gang Parade held their first concert tour, the Barely Last Tour. During the tour on October 2, new member Can GP Maika joined the group. On October 6, new members Coco Partin Coco, Yuka Terashima and Yui Ga Dockson joined the group. The group released their second album overall and first as Gang Parade, Barely Last, on November 8.

=== 2017–2019: Major label debut ===
In April 2017, Gang Parade embarked on their second concert tour, the Gang Parade Body & 7 Soul Tour. Their sixth single, "Foul", was released on April 25. In July, Gang Parade embarked on their third concert tour, the Gang Parade Beyond the Mountain Tour. Their seventh single, "Beyond the Mountain", was released on July 25. The group's third album, Gang Parade Takes Themselves Higher!!, was released on November 21.

From January to February 2018, Gang Parade embarked on their fourth concert tour, the Gang Parade Breaking the Road Tour. Their eighth single, "Breaking the Road", was released on February 20. On April 17, two new members, Usagi Tsukino and Haruna Bad Chiiiin joined the group. Their ninth single, "Gang 2", was released on May 29. From July to September Gang Parade embarked on their fifth concert tour, the Gang Parade Rebuild Tour. Their tenth single, "Can't Stop", was released on September 11.

The group's fourth album, Last Gang Parade, was released on January 8, 2019. On March 20, new member, Naruhaworld was revealed to be joining the group on May 26. Their eleventh single, "Brand New Parade", was released on April 17, through Fueled By Mentaiko marking their major label debut. Gang Parade embarked on their sixth concert tour, the Challenge the Limit Tour in May, followed by their seventh concert tour, Parade Goes on Tour, from September to November. The group's fifth album, Love Parade, was released on November 1.

=== 2020–2021: Member departures and group split ===
On January 3, 2020, Saki Kamiya announced that she would leave the group at the end of their first hall tour. On January 29, the limited distribution double A-side single, "Namida no Stage / Fix Your Teeth", was released. On February 20, Haruna Bad Chiiiin withdrew from the group.

On March 28, Gang Parade split into two groups: Go to the Beds, consisting of Miki Yamamachi, Yua Yumeno, Can GP Maika, Yui Ga Dockson and Coco Partin Coco, and Paradises, consisting of Yuka Terashima, Usagi Tsukino and Naruhaworld. They released the split EP, G/P, consisting of three songs per group and Saki Kamiya's final solo song before graduating from Gang Parade on May 22.

The group's eighth concert tour, My First Hall Tour, was cancelled due to the COVID-19 pandemic. On May 22, Saki Kamiya left the group via a livestream instead of the concert scheduled for the same day because of the ongoing COVID-19 pandemic. On May 22, 2021, Gang Parade held their final concert with Saki Kamiya, Forever Gang Parade Forever, at Nakano Sun Plaza.

=== 2022: Resuming activities and new members ===
On January 2, 2022, Gang Parade resumed activities with the addition of Kila May, Ca Non and Changbaby as new members. In January, Gang Parade went on their first tour since 2019. They released the single, "Parade Goes On", on March 9. On March 26, it was announced that two new members, Ainastar and Potential (then known as Tantan), would join the group on May 13. Naruhaworld resumed activities on the day that they joined.

On May 25, they released the compilation album, Welcome to Gang Parade, consisting of previously released Gang Parade, Go to the Beds and Paradises songs with updated vocals by the new thirteen member line-up. They held the concert tour, Gang Parade Greatest Show Tour, from May till June. They released the single, "Signal", on July 13. The deluxe edition of Welcome to Gang Parade was released on July 30. From September to November, they held the Everything Must Go Tour. The single "Priority" was released on November 16. The complete edition of Welcome to Gang Parade was released on November 21. The group performed the theme song, "LOL", for Me & Roboco.

=== 2023–2024: Kiss Kiss and member departures ===
In April 2023, They held the Never Ending Parade Tour. On May 10, they released their sixth album, Our Parade. On June 21, Kiss Kiss, a group consisting of six Gang Parade members, released their debut album, First Album. In August, they held the Gilagila Gang Gals Tour and the Kirakira School Kids Parade Tour. From September to October, they held Trick or Smile Tour. Gang Parade released their first EP, The Night Park E.P., on November 15. The song "Träumerei" from the EP was used as the opening theme song for television drama My Personal Weatherman.

They released the digital singles, "Yakudō" and "Rock wo Tomeru na!!", on January 13 and January 29, 2024, respectively. On March 27, they performed at The Underworld in London alongside ASP and Kiss Kiss. The single "PassioGila / Yakudō / Rock wo Tomeru na!!", was released on May 22. In June and July, they held the Avantgarde Parade Tour. On July 16, Potential graduated from Gang Parade and Kiss Kiss. On August 28, they released the single "Peace☆Chō Panic / Itsuka". Yuka Terashima graduated from Gang Parade on December 1. They released the single, "Sparkling Moon / Good Luck My Future", on December 25.

=== 2025-2026: WACK in the UK and disbandment notice ===
On March 26, 2025, they performed at The Underworld in London in the fifth edition of WACK in the UK. They released their seventh album, Gang Rise, on June 18.

On December 1, former WACK Representative Director Junnosuke Watanabe announced that he planned to start the "Second Chapter" of the company and disband Gang Parade in 2026. The remaining members could participate in WACK's March 2026 audition camp or leave the company by 2027. None of them appeared as candidates, though Coco Partin Coco arrived on March 24, 2026, as a mentor, and left two days later.

On January 1, 2026, Gang Parade announced that they would disband on October 29. From April 18 to July 12, they embarked on Gang Parade So Long Tour, which was their last. Their best-of and final album, Gang Finale, was released on June 17.

On June 20, Gang Parade revealed the name of their final live, Last Say Hello!!, at Zepp Haneda, Tokyo.

== Members ==
=== Final Line-up ===
- Miki Yamamachi (ヤママチミキ)
- Yua Yumeno (ユメノユア)
- Can GP Maika (キャン・GP・マイカ)
- Coco Partin Coco (ココ・パーティン・ココ)
- Yui Ga Dockson (ユイ・ガ・ドクソン)
- Usagi Tsukino (月ノウサギ)
- Naruhaworld (ナルハワールド)
- Kila May (キラ・メイ)
- Ca Non (キャ・ノン)
- Changbaby (チャンベイビー)
- Ainastar (アイナスター)

=== Former ===
- Mari Mizuta (ミズタマリ)
- Ao Shigusawa (シグサワアオ)
- Maaya Inukai (イヌカイマアヤ)
- Aya Eightprince (アヤ・エイトプリンス)
- Haruna Bad Chiiiin (ハルナ・バッ・チーン)
- Saki Kamiya (カミヤサキ)
- Potential (カ能セイ, Kanōsei)
- Yuka Terashima (テラシマユウカ)

== Discography ==
Gang Parade discography
- Studio albums: 7
- EPs: 1
- Compilation albums: 1
- Singles: 32

=== Studio albums ===
Title	Album details	Peak positions	
Title	Album details	JPN Oricon	JPN Billboard
POP
P.O.P	Released: August 4, 2015; Label: T-Palette Records; Formats: CD, digital download	33	51
Gang Parade
Barely Last	Released: November 8, 2016; Label: T-Palette Records; Formats: CD, digital download	29	59
Gang Parade Takes Themselves Higher!!	Released: November 21, 2017; Label: T-Palette Records; Formats: CD, digital download	14	14
Last Gang Parade	Released: January 8, 2019; Label: T-Palette Records; Formats: CD, digital download	4	6
Love Parade	Released: November 13, 2019; Label: Fueled By Mentaiko; Formats: CD, digital download	2	4
Our Parade	Released: May 10, 2023; Label: Fueled by Mentaiko; Formats: CD, digital download	1	1
Gang Rise	Released: June 18, 2025; Label: Fueled by Mentaiko; Formats: CD, digital download	5	36

=== Compilation albums ===
Title	Album details	Peak positions	
Title	Album details	JPN Oricon	JPN Billboard
Welcome to Gang Parade	Released: May 25, 2022; Re-released on July 30, 2022 (Deluxe Edition); Re-released on November 21, 2022 (Complete Edition); Label: Fueled By Mentaiko; Formats: CD, digital download	—	63
Gang Finale	Released: June 17, 2026; Label: Fueled by Mentaiko; Formats: CD, digital download	5	56

=== Extended plays ===
Title	EP details	Peak positions	
Title	EP details	JPN Oricon	JPN Billboard
The Night Park E.P.	Released: November 15, 2023; Label: Fueled by Mentaiko; Formats: CD, digital download	4	3

=== Singles ===
Title	Year	Peak positions		Certifications	Album
Title	Year	JPN Oricon	JPN Billboard	Certifications	Album
Pla2me
"Plastic 2 Mercy"	2014	21	83		P.O.P
"Unit"	2015	16	85		P.O.P
POP
"Happy Lucky Kirakira Lucky"	2015	24	—		Barely Last
"Queen of POP"	2016	13	96		Barely Last
Gang Parade
"We Are the Idol"	2016	22	—		Barely Last
"Foul"	2017	14	47		Gang Parade Takes Themselves Higher!!
"Beyond the Mountain"	2017	11	24		Gang Parade Takes Themselves Higher!!
"Breaking the Road"	2018	5	11		Last Gang Parade
"Gang 2"	2018	5	11		Last Gang Parade
"Can't Stop"	2018	4	13		Last Gang Parade
"Brand New Parade" (ブランニューパレード)	2019	2	6	RIAJ: Gold	Love Parade
"Love Communication" (Note: "Love Communication" was released as a digital single.)	2019	—	—		Love Parade
"Namida no Stage" (涙のステージ) (Note: "Namida no Stage / Fix Your Teeth" was released as a limited distribution single.)	2020	—	72		Non-album singles
"Fix Your Teeth"	2020	—	55		Non-album singles
"Parade Goes On"	2022	2	29		Our Parade
"Signal" (シグナル)	2022	4	19		Our Parade
"Priority"	2022	3	10		Our Parade
"LOL" (Note: "LOL" was released as a digital single.)	2023	—	—		Our Parade
"Somnium" (ソムニウム) (Note: "Somnium" was released as a digital single.)	2023	—	—		The Night Park E.P.
"Yakudō" (躍動) (Note: "Yakudō" and "Rock wo Tomeru na!!" were initially released as digital singles. "PassioGila / Yakudō / Rock wo Tomeru na!!" was later released as a single.)	2024	7	—		Gang Rise
"Rock wo Tomeru na!!" (Rockを止めるな！！)	2024	7	—		Gang Rise
"PassioGila" (パショギラ)	2024	7	26		Gang Rise
"Itsuka" (一夏)	2024	6	—		Gang Rise
"Peace – Chō Panic" (Peace☆超パニック)	2024	6	12		Gang Rise
"Sparkling Moon"	2024	1	18		Gang Rise
"Good Luck My Future" (グッドラック・マイフューチャー)	2024	1	—		Gang Rise
"So Many Members" (Note: "So Many Members" was released as a digital single.)	2025	—	—		Gang Rise
"Ima Wo Kakeru" (イマヲカケル) (Note: "Ima Wo Kakeru" was released as a digital single.)	2025	—	—		Gang Rise
"Hey! Ho! Saikō Jan!" (ヘイ！ホー！最高じゃん！) (Note: "Hey! Ho! Saikō Jan!" was released as a digital single.)	2025	—	—		Gang Rise
"Ambivalent" (アンビバレント) (Note: "Ambivalent" was released as a digital single.)	2025	—	—		Gang Rise
"Gang Gang Disco" (Note: "Gang Gang Disco" was released as a digital single.)	2025	—	—		Gang Rise
"Happy Yummy Lucky Yummy" (Note: "Happy Yummy Lucky Yummy" was released as a digital single.)	2025	—	—		Non-album single
"Kimi no Okage"	2026	6	49		Gang Finale
"Plastic 2 Mercy (GANG FINALE ver.)" (Note: "Plastic 2 Mercy (GANG FINALE ver.)" was released as a digital single.)	2026	—	—		Gang Finale
"—" denotes a recording that did not chart or was not released in that territory.

== Filmography ==
=== Blu-rays ===
Title	Album details	Peak chart positions
Title	Album details	Oricon
Gang Parade Oneman Live at Zepp Tokyo	Released: December 11, 2018; Label: T-Palette Records; Formats: Blu-ray	14
Challenge the Limit Tour at Hibiya Open Air Concert Hall	Released: September 4, 2019; Label: Fueled By Mentaiko; Formats: Blu-ray	15
Parade Goes on Tour at Nakano Sun Plaza	Released: February 26, 2020; Label: Fueled By Mentaiko; Formats: Blu-ray	19

== Concerts and tours ==
=== Tours ===
- Barely Last Tour (2016)
- Gang Parade Body & 7 Soul Tour (2017)
- Gang Parade Beyond the Mountain Tour (2017)
- Gang Parade Breaking the Road Tour (2018)
- Gang Parade Rebuild Tour (2018)
- Challenge the Limit Tour (2019)
- Parade Goes on Tour (2019)
- My First Hall Tour (2020; Cancelled)
- Gang Parade Goes On Tour (2022)
- Gang Parade the Greatest Show Tour (2022)
- Everything Must Go Tour (2022)
- Never Ending Parade Tour (2023)
- Gilagila Gang Gals Tour (2023)
- Kirakira School Kids Parade Tour (2023)
- Trick or Smile Tour (2023)
- Avantgarde Parade Tour (2024)
- Gang Rise Tour (2025)
- Fanclub Asoviva 2025 ~One More Parade Tour~ (2025)
- Gang Parade Archives (2026)
- Gang Parade So Long Tour (2026)

=== Concerts ===
- Pla2me Say Hello (2014)
- Pla2me Say Hello Hello (2014)
- Pla2me Nagoya Say Hello (2014)
- Pla2me Osaka Say Hello (2014)
- Period Of Plastic 2 Mercy (2015)
- Come Back My (2015)
- Queen Of POP (2016)
- We Are the Idol (2016)
- Barely Last (2016)
- Girl Parade (2017)
- Gang Parade Girls Park (2018)
- Gang Parade Making the Road (2018)
- Gang 2 (2018)
- Forever Gang Parade Forever (2021)
- Girls Parade (2022)
- Lovers Parade (2022)
- Gang Parade Memorial Live -Past, Now, and Future- (2023)
- Crossroads of Fate (2023)
- To Be Born (2024)
- WACK in the UK Vol. 2 with ASP and Kiss Kiss (2024)
- WACK in the UK Vol. 5 with ASP and Kiss Kiss (2025)
- The Gang Parade Rises (2025)
- Gang Parade with Gang Boyz presents "The Gang Parade Rises Z" (2025)
- Kyouyuu (2025)
- Gang Parade 10th Year Special Live "Thank You, Parade" (2025)
- Last Say Hello!! (2026)

== Awards and nominations ==
Award ceremony	Year	Category	Nominee(s)/work(s)	Result	Ref.
Gold Disc Awards	2020	Best 5 New Artist	Gang Parade	Won	
