= Matsuri (band) =

Japanese band

- Origin: Japan
- Genres: Ryūkōka, J-pop
- Years active: 2023–present
- Members: Matoko Watanabe; Kenji Hashizume; Tsubasa Onodera; Takuya Matsuoka; Wataru Suzuki; Yuki "Jeity" Yanagida

Matsuri (stylized in all caps) are a Japanese musical group produced by Yasushi Akimoto. Their music is described as "Ryūkōka and Showa era pop in the modern era."

The 12 members, who have a variety of backgrounds, including a former J-Leaguer, a garbage collector, and a cooking expert, are divided into two teams, Matsuri and Show-wa. Their costumes are mainly blue.

They made their major debut on January 22, 2025, with the single "Aventure Nakameguro".

== History ==
In June 2023, Avex, Japan Music Entertainment, and Y&N Brothers, three powerful companies in the entertainment industry, hold the "Don't give up on your dreams! Male group auditions". On July 25, the 12 candidates who won out of over 3,000 audition applicants formed "Matsuri" and "Show-wa" as two new groups produced by Yasushi Akimoto with the concept of "Showa Kayo and Showa pop in the modern era". Matsuri and Show-wa started a nationwide AEON Mall tour on December 24, aiming for a major debut.

On January 23 and 31, 2024, Matsuri performed solo at Tokyu Kabukicho Tower. In February, Matsuri's first original song "Ima Sara Kakko Tsukete Rarenae" was chosen as the ending song for Fuji TV's "Mezamashi 8" in February and March. On February 25, Matsuri and Show-wa completed a tour visiting 21 AEON Malls nationwide. On March 3, they performed their first guerrilla live show in Shibuya.

On January 28, 2025, Matsuri's debut single "Aventure Nakameguro" debuted at number one on the Oricon Singles Chart.
