= List of Produce 101 Japan (season 2) contestants =

Produce 101 Japan (season 2) is a 2021 Japanese reality competition show and spin-off of the South Korean television series Produce 101. 101 trainees, aged 15–27 years old who are not affiliated with any talent agency, will be competing to debut in an 11-member boy band, with members selected by live voting from the viewers.

== Contestants ==
The spelling of names in English is according to the official website. The Japanese contestants are presented in Western order (given name, family name), while the names of the foreign contestants are presented in Eastern order (family name, given name).

Color key

Top 11 of the week
Saved
Left the show
Contestants eliminated in Episode 0
Contestants eliminated in Episode 5
Contestants eliminated in Episode 9
Contestants eliminated in Episode 10
Final members of INI

Region	Audition Team Name	Name	Age	Judges' Evaluation		Ranking											
Region	Audition Team Name	Name	Age	Judges' Evaluation		Ep.1	Ep.2	Ep.3	Episode 5		Ep.6	Ep.7	Episode 9		Episode 10		Final
Region	Audition Team Name	Name	Age	1	2	#	#	#	#	Votes (Note: Number of votes for the eliminated contestants were not shown on-air on Episode 5.)	#	#	#	Votes (Note: Number of votes for the eliminated contestants were not announced.)	#	Votes (Note: Number of votes for the eliminated contestants were not announced.)	Final
Aichi	DU Quintet	Masaya Kimura (木村 柾哉)	23	B	A	1	2	1	1	1,476,946	1	2	2	711,278	1	380,796	1
Tokyo	Big Dream (ビッグドリーム)	Hiromu Takatsuka (髙塚 大夢)	21	B	A	8	13	12	8	899,044	9	16	17	277,771	2	316,127	2
Tokyo	K-Phoenix (Kフェニックス)	Shogo Tajima (田島 将吾)	22	A	A	2	1	2	2	1,402,055	2	1	1	738,955	3	281,323	3
Nagano	Mogitate Alps (もぎたてアルプス)	Kyosuke Fujimaki (藤牧 京介)	21	B	A	12	4	4	3	1,135,900	5	3	3	524,051	4	276,066	4
Osaka	Prince of Naniwa (浪速のプリンス)	Takumi Ozaki (尾崎 匠海)	21	A	A	14	6	5	5	1,087,177	7	8	8	350,768	5	264,254	5
Kagoshima	Ikinari Smile (いきなりスマイル)	Hiroto Nishi (西 洸人)	24	A	C	4	3	3	4	1,128,968	4	5	5	456,053	6	259,628	6
Okinawa	SUPER MENSORE	Jin Matsuda (松田 迅)	18	C	C	47	24	27	25	351,241	13	13	14	293,692	7	252,479	7
China	Team-A	Xu Fengfan (許 豊凡)	23	C	B	7	10	10	12	740,222	14	21	19	254,742	8	249,237	8
Fukuoka	T-RAP	Rihito Ikezaki (池﨑 理人)	19	C	D	11	12	14	15	609,277	16	15	13	309,654	9	249,021	9
Osaka	Prince of Naniwa (浪速のプリンス)	Yudai Sano (佐野 雄大)	20	D	F	3	5	6	7	966,407	8	12	9	350,580	10	243,006	10
Osaka	Prince of Naniwa (浪速のプリンス)	Takeru Goto (後藤 威尊)	21	C	B	5	9	11	9	843,923	12	14	11	338,013	11	239,150	11
Fukuoka	DK WEST	Nalu Okubo (大久保 波留)	16	C	D	13	8	8	10	829,447	15	20	16	282,339	12	Eliminated	12
Tokyo	DU Quintet	Daigo Kobayashi (小林 大悟)	19	A	B	22	25	23	22	404,470	6	7	7	357,404	13	Eliminated	13
Fukuoka	WEST Selection (WEST セレクション)	Shunsei Ota (太田 駿静)	21	C	B	6	15	15	14	619,063	17	11	10	345,747	14	Eliminated	14
Saitama	DU Quintet	Syunji Koike (小池 俊司)	18	A	A	46	39	29	26	335,386	10	4	6	377,619	15	Eliminated	15
Nagasaki	K-Phoenix (Kフェニックス)	Renta Nishijima (西島 蓮汰)	18	A	C	10	7	7	6	975,241	3	6	4	457,123	16	Eliminated	16
Hiroshima	DK WEST	Koshin Terao (寺尾 香信)	17	C	B	48	16	13	13	641,784	11	19	20	247,132	17	Eliminated	17
Philippines	Team-A	Anthonny Iinuma (飯沼 アントニー)	17	A	A	9	11	9	11	761,184	21	17	15	290,793	18	Eliminated	18
Osaka	T-RAP	Kaiho Nakano (中野 海帆)	22	B	D	53	20	21	23	391,655	23	9	12	315,328	19	Eliminated	19
Indonesia	Team-A	Toma Nakamura (仲村 冬馬)	23	A	A	24	27	25	21	407,547	29	18	18	256,657	20	Eliminated	20
Chiba	Jet Marines (ジェットマリーンズ)	Kouki Sakamoto (阪本 航紀) (Note: He was saved by the Global Producers' votes.)	20	D	B	35	32	30	35	258,269	19	10	21 (G)	234,929	21	Eliminated	21
Kanagawa	Revengers (リベンジャーズ)	Shinsuke Yotsuya (四谷 真佑)	20	C	C	26	49	43	32	286,878	18	23	22	Eliminated			22
Ehime	WEST Selection (WEST セレクション)	Kohei Kurita (栗田 航兵)	19	C	D	17	17	19	20	414,513	20	22	23	Eliminated			23
Tokyo	TEEN EAST (ティーンEAST)	Shu Kobori (小堀 柊)	17	C	F	54	43	36	34	273,255	24	25	24	Eliminated			24
Saitama	DU Quintet	Hideaki Sasaoka (笹岡 秀旭)	20	C	B	39	26	32	33	274,551	27	30	25	Eliminated			25
Osaka	DK WEST	Yuta Izutsu (井筒 裕太)	17	B	B	45	30	34	30	297,634	28	29	26	Eliminated			26
Aichi	Cha Cha Love (チャ•チャ•ラブ)	Masaki Uchida (内田 正紀)	23	D	C	34	47	44	40	214,839	25	24	27	Eliminated			27
Tokyo	TOKYO BROTHERS (TOKYO ブラザーズ)	Mizuki Shinohara (篠原 瑞希)	21	F	B	25	37	28	24	362,101	26	28	28	Eliminated			28
Kyoto	KANSAI Shinsengumi (KANSAI新鮮組)	Hiroaki Morii (森井 洸陽)	21	F	F	18	14	16	16	498,013	22	26	29	Eliminated			29
Saitama	KTS	Wataru Takahashi (髙橋 航大) (Note: Although eliminated, he returned to the competition to fill the spot vacated by Naoki Kose.)	20	D	C	31	40	42	41	—	34	27	30	Eliminated			30
Tokyo	Ikinari Smile (いきなりスマイル)	Kenta Muramatsu (村松 健太)	20	C	D	38	23	24	28	323,986	30	31	31	Eliminated			31
Tochigi	D Flight (Dフライト)	Shoya Fukuda (福田 翔也)	23	B	A	41	21	17	19	458,008	32	32	32	Eliminated			32
Saitama	D Flight (Dフライト)	Hikaru Vasayegh (ヴァサイェガ 光)	22	C	C	16	19	22	27	334,938	37	35	33	Eliminated			33
Hyogo	DK WEST	Ken Hiramoto (平本 健)	16	B	D	20	22	26	29	299,105	35	36	34	Eliminated			34
Tochigi	TEEN EAST (ティーンEAST)	Ayuta Fukuda (福田 歩汰)	18	D	F	21	29	33	37	231,458	36	37	35	Eliminated			35
Chiba	Jet Marines (ジェットマリーンズ)	Ayumu Owada (大和田 歩夢)	20	F	D	23	35	41	31	288,712	33	34	36	Eliminated			36
Niigata	White Lover	Rui Iiyoshi (飯吉 流生)	22	C	B	30	41	38	38	222,831	31	33	37	Eliminated			37
Shizuoka	Cha Cha Love (チャ•チャ•ラブ)	Masato Ueda (上田 将人)	21	F	D	19	38	37	36	238,669	38	38	38	Eliminated			38
Chiba	Ikinari Smile (いきなりスマイル)	Yusei Tekoe (テコエ 勇聖)	22	B	A	15	18	18	18	466,181	40	40	39	Eliminated			39
Miyagi	White Lover	Akihira Matsumoto (松本 旭平)	27	D	D	44	33	31	39	216,469	39	39	40	Eliminated			40
Osaka	Revengers (リベンジャーズ)	Naoki Kose (古瀬 直輝) (Note: He ranked 17th on Episode 5 but left after the first elimination due to his being tested positive for COVID-19.)	22	B	A	49	28	20	17	492,462	Left the show						41
Okinawa	SUPER MENSORE	Ryoma Kitayama (北山 龍磨)	21	C	B	32	31	35	42	Eliminated							42
Shizuoka	Cha Cha Love (チャ•チャ•ラブ)	Ayumu Shinogaya (篠ヶ谷 歩夢)	19	F	C	28	46	45	43	Eliminated							43
Okinawa	SUPER MENSORE	Takahiro Uehara (上原 貴博)	21	C	C	42	34	39	44	Eliminated							44
Nagano	Mogitate Alps (もぎたてアルプス)	Norihiko Miyashita (宮下 紀彦)	21	D	D	40	36	40	45	Eliminated							45
Aichi	TEEN EAST (ティーンEAST)	Haruki Yamamoto (山本 遥貴)	17	B	B	37	51	48	46	Eliminated							46
Osaka	Revengers (リベンジャーズ)	Rick Yasue (安江 律久)	21	D	D	55	57	57	47	Eliminated							47
Aichi	TEEN EAST (ティーンEAST)	Daisuke Tawada (多和田 大祐)	17	D	F	33	42	46	48	Eliminated							48
Tokyo	TOKYO BROTHERS (TOKYO ブラザーズ)	Tsukasa Sakuma (佐久間 司紗)	20	D	C	50	45	47	49	Eliminated							49
Hiroshima	Revengers (リベンジャーズ)	Tenki Misasagawa (三佐々川 天輝)	21	D	F	56	52	54	50	Eliminated							50
Hyogo	KANSAI Shinsengumi (KANSAI新鮮組)	Ibuki Hattori (服部 息吹)	19	C	D	29	44	49	51	Eliminated							51
Yamanashi	Mogitate Alps (もぎたてアルプス)	Sera Fujimoto (藤本 世羅)	21	D	D	43	50	55	52	Eliminated							52
Shizuoka	KTS	Ryusuke Kodama (児玉 龍亮)	17	D	C	52	55	53	53	Eliminated							53
Hokkaido	White Lover	Raia Edamoto (枝元 雷亜)	21	D	D	59	54	50	54	Eliminated							54
Hyogo	KANSAI Shinsengumi (KANSAI新鮮組)	Renya Naitou (内藤 廉哉)	18	C	F	27	48	51	55	Eliminated							55
Osaka	Big Dream (ビッグドリーム)	Muta Azumi (安積 夢大)	19	D	B	58	53	52	56	Eliminated							56
Tokyo	TOKYO BROTHERS (TOKYO ブラザーズ)	Reiji Fukushima (福島 零士)	22	C	B	51	59	59	57	Eliminated							57
Chiba	Jet Marines (ジェットマリーンズ)	Tomoki Nishiyama (西山 知輝)	22	F	C	36	56	56	58	Eliminated							58
Tokyo	DU Quintet	Hajime Abe (阿部 創)	20	D	B	57	58	58	59	Eliminated							59
Hiroshima	WEST Selection (WEST セレクション)	Yuto Furue (古江 侑豊)	19	F	C	60	60	60	60	Eliminated							60
Tokyo	—	Reo Okada (岡田 玲旺)	16	Eliminated													61
Shizuoka	—	Hiroki Kajita (梶田 拓希)	18	Eliminated													62
Tokyo	—	Tomoki Nishiyama (西山 知輝)	20	Eliminated													63
Hiroshima	—	Ren Okamoto (岡本 怜)	22	Eliminated													64
Mie	—	Haruto Tsuboi (坪井 悠斗)	19	Eliminated													65
Hyogo	—	Katsuhisa Ikemoto (池本 勝久)	16	Eliminated													66
Aichi	—	Yuki Miura (三浦 由暉)	19	Eliminated													67
Hyogo	—	Daisuke Morisaki (森崎 大祐)	19	Eliminated													68
Kanagawa	—	Shogo Kokubu (国分 翔悟)	25	Eliminated													69
Tokyo	—	Kaito Kawamura (川村 海斗)	20	Eliminated													70
Saitama	—	Kazuma Iwata (安積 夢大)	20	Eliminated													71
Fukushima	—	Shogo Noji (野地 章吾)	18	Eliminated													72
Mexico	—	Julio Taichiro Shima (島フリオ太一郎)	20	Eliminated													73
Hokkaido	—	Raito Sato (佐藤 頼輝)	19	Eliminated													74
Kumamoto	—	Sota Hori (堀 蒼太)	21	Eliminated													75
Osaka	—	Tomoki Fuji (藤 智樹)	20	Eliminated													76
Aichi	—	Hitoru Hashimoto (橋本 瞳瑠)	17	Eliminated													77
Kagoshima	—	Kaito Dozono (堂園 海翔)	18	Eliminated													78
Miyazaki	—	Naoki Tsunematsu (恒松 尚輝)	20	Eliminated													79
Fukushima	—	Towa Miyazaki (宮崎 永遠)	18	Eliminated													80
Nagasaki	—	Yusuke Tagawa (田川 祐輔)	21	Eliminated													81
Tokyo	—	Syogo Mukoyama (向山 翔悟)	18	Eliminated													82
Tokyo	—	Hiromu Honda (本多 大夢)	20	Eliminated													83
Fukushima	—	Daichi Kato (加藤 大地)	22	Eliminated													84
Tokyo	—	Neo Yoshii (吉井 寧皇)	19	Eliminated													85
Chiba	—	Haruki Arai (新井 遥紀)	20	Eliminated													86
Nagano	—	Yuto Shimizu (清水 裕斗)	18	Eliminated													87
Saitama	—	Yuri Ikeda (池田 悠里)	19	Eliminated													88
Okinawa	—	Shosuke Taka (髙 昇舗)	16	Eliminated													89
Kyoto	—	Yuuto Sakai (酒井 優人)	21	Eliminated													90
Ehime	—	Haruto Tsurufuji (鶴藤 遥大)	18	Eliminated													91
Kanagawa	—	Hideki Yamada (山田 英樹)	21	Eliminated													92
Kanagawa	—	Niji Kojima (古島 虹)	16	Eliminated													93
Saitama	—	Rintaro Orihara (折原 凛太郎)	20	Eliminated													94
Kanagawa	—	Tomohiro Nakano (中野 智博)	19	Eliminated													95
Chiba	—	Shoma Yoshida (吉田 翔馬)	22	Eliminated													96
Hiroshima	—	Takumi Fujihara (藤原 拓海)	20	Eliminated													97
Osaka	—	Kenta Marubayashi (丸林 健太)	18	Eliminated													98
Tokyo	—	Misaki Tomizawa (冨澤 岬樹)	19	Eliminated													99
Kumamoto	—	Hibiki Fujisawa (藤沢 響己) (Note: Hibiki Fujisawa and Fuma Murata left the show before the first episode aired.)	23	—	—	Left the show											—
Shizuoka	—	Fuma Murata (村田 風雅)	22	—	—	Left the show											—

== Group Battle Evaluation Performances (Episode 3-4) ==
Color key

- Winner
- Leader
- Center
- Leader and Center

Bold denotes the person who picked the team members.

Performance			Team		Contestant				
#	Artist	Song	#	Votes	Position	Name	Votes	Votes with bonus	Rank
1	BTS	"I Need U"	1 Bento Shounendan (弁当少年団)	181	Main Vocal	Hideaki Sasaoka	54		31
1	BTS	"I Need U"	1 Bento Shounendan (弁当少年団)	181	Sub Vocal 1	Masaki Uchida	17		46
1	BTS	"I Need U"	1 Bento Shounendan (弁当少年団)	181	Sub Vocal 2	Ayumu Shinogaya	9		52
1	BTS	"I Need U"	1 Bento Shounendan (弁当少年団)	181	Main Rapper	Tenki Misasagawa	38		35
1	BTS	"I Need U"	1 Bento Shounendan (弁当少年団)	181	Sub Rapper 1	Yuta Izutsu	39		34
1	BTS	"I Need U"	1 Bento Shounendan (弁当少年団)	181	Sub Rapper 2	**Rick Yasue**	24		42
1	BTS	"I Need U"	2 I (愛)	187	Main Vocal	Xu Fengfan	34	3,034	13
1	BTS	"I Need U"	2 I (愛)	187	Sub Vocal 1	Shoya Fukuda	36	3,036	12
1	BTS	"I Need U"	2 I (愛)	187	Sub Vocal 2	Toma Nakamura	16	3,016	22
1	BTS	"I Need U"	2 I (愛)	187	Main Rapper	Kaiho Nakano	67	3,067	4
1	BTS	"I Need U"	2 I (愛)	187	Sub Rapper 1	**Ryoma Kitayama**	14	3,014	23
1	BTS	"I Need U"	2 I (愛)	187	Sub Rapper 2	Ayumu Owada	20	3,020	20
2	Generations from Exile Tribe	"Ageha"	1 Lívera	167	Main Vocal	Masato Ueda	32		38
2	Generations from Exile Tribe	"Ageha"	1 Lívera	167	Sub Vocal 1	**Takahiro Uehara**	15		48
2	Generations from Exile Tribe	"Ageha"	1 Lívera	167	Sub Vocal 2	Syunji Koike	16		47
2	Generations from Exile Tribe	"Ageha"	1 Lívera	167	Sub Vocal 3	Takeru Goto	49		32
2	Generations from Exile Tribe	"Ageha"	1 Lívera	167	Sub Vocal 4	Tsukasa Sakuma	18		45
2	Generations from Exile Tribe	"Ageha"	1 Lívera	167	Rapper	Rihito Ikezaki	37		36
2	Generations from Exile Tribe	"Ageha"	2 HiGH VOLTAGE	188	Main Vocal	Hiromu Takatsuka	108	3,108	1
2	Generations from Exile Tribe	"Ageha"	2 HiGH VOLTAGE	188	Sub Vocal 1	**Sera Fujimoto**	7	3,007	27
2	Generations from Exile Tribe	"Ageha"	2 HiGH VOLTAGE	188	Sub Vocal 2	Wataru Takahashi	13	3,013	24
2	Generations from Exile Tribe	"Ageha"	2 HiGH VOLTAGE	188	Sub Vocal 3	Yusei Tekoe	7	3,007	27
2	Generations from Exile Tribe	"Ageha"	2 HiGH VOLTAGE	188	Sub Vocal 4	Ayuta Fukuda	26	3,026	16
2	Generations from Exile Tribe	"Ageha"	2 HiGH VOLTAGE	188	Rapper	Reiji Fukushima	27	3,027	15
3	King & Prince	"&Love"	1 Baby Love (ベビーラブ)	131	Main Vocal	Kouki Sakamoto	29		40
3	King & Prince	"&Love"	1 Baby Love (ベビーラブ)	131	Sub Vocal 1	Yudai Sano	43		33
3	King & Prince	"&Love"	1 Baby Love (ベビーラブ)	131	Sub Vocal 2	**Kohei Kurita**	23		43
3	King & Prince	"&Love"	1 Baby Love (ベビーラブ)	131	Sub Vocal 3	Norihiko Miyashita	4		54
3	King & Prince	"&Love"	1 Baby Love (ベビーラブ)	131	Sub Vocal 4	Ibuki Hattori	27		41
3	King & Prince	"&Love"	1 Baby Love (ベビーラブ)	131	Sub Vocal 5	Hikaru Vasayegh	5		53
3	King & Prince	"&Love"	2 Ababies (アベビース)	239	Main Vocal	Haruki Yamamoto	64	3,064	5
3	King & Prince	"&Love"	2 Ababies (アベビース)	239	Sub Vocal 1	Renya Naitou	12	3,012	25
3	King & Prince	"&Love"	2 Ababies (アベビース)	239	Sub Vocal 2	Nalu Okubo	78	3,078	2
3	King & Prince	"&Love"	2 Ababies (アベビース)	239	Sub Vocal 3	**Mizuki Shinohara**	50	3,050	7
3	King & Prince	"&Love"	2 Ababies (アベビース)	239	Sub Vocal 4	Koshin Terao	10	3,010	26
3	King & Prince	"&Love"	2 Ababies (アベビース)	239	Sub Vocal 5	Ken Hiramoto	25	3,025	17
4	SHINee	"Your Number"	1 Focused Attack (집중 공격)	171	Main Vocal	Rui Iiyoshi	77		29
4	SHINee	"Your Number"	1 Focused Attack (집중 공격)	171	Sub Vocal 1	**Raia Edamoto**	13		49
4	SHINee	"Your Number"	1 Focused Attack (집중 공격)	171	Sub Vocal 2	Hajime Abe	16		47
4	SHINee	"Your Number"	1 Focused Attack (집중 공격)	171	Sub Vocal 3	Ryusuke Kodama	23		43
4	SHINee	"Your Number"	1 Focused Attack (집중 공격)	171	Sub Vocal 4	Daisuke Tawada	11		50
4	SHINee	"Your Number"	1 Focused Attack (집중 공격)	171	Rapper	Akihira Matsumoto	31		39
4	SHINee	"Your Number"	2 Men Who Go Well With Red Wine (赤ワインに似合う男たち)	199	Main Vocal	Tomoki Nishiyama	43	3,043	9
4	SHINee	"Your Number"	2 Men Who Go Well With Red Wine (赤ワインに似合う男たち)	199	Sub Vocal 1	Jin Matsuda	41	3,041	10
4	SHINee	"Your Number"	2 Men Who Go Well With Red Wine (赤ワインに似合う男たち)	199	Sub Vocal 2	Yuto Furue	2	3,002	28
4	SHINee	"Your Number"	2 Men Who Go Well With Red Wine (赤ワインに似合う男たち)	199	Sub Vocal 3	Muta Azumi	10	3,010	26
4	SHINee	"Your Number"	2 Men Who Go Well With Red Wine (赤ワインに似合う男たち)	199	Sub Vocal 4	**Hiroaki Morii**	58	3,058	6
4	SHINee	"Your Number"	2 Men Who Go Well With Red Wine (赤ワインに似合う男たち)	199	Rapper	Kenta Muramatsu	45	3,045	8
5	JO1	"Infinity (無限大)"	1 INFINITY	202	Main Vocal	Kyosuke Fujimaki	40	3,040	11
5	JO1	"Infinity (無限大)"	1 INFINITY	202	Sub Vocal 1	Takumi Ozaki	24	3,024	18
5	JO1	"Infinity (無限大)"	1 INFINITY	202	Sub Vocal 2	**Masaya Kimura**	29	3,029	14
5	JO1	"Infinity (無限大)"	1 INFINITY	202	Sub Vocal 3	Anthonny Iinuma	23	3,023	19
5	JO1	"Infinity (無限大)"	1 INFINITY	202	Rapper 1	Hiroto Nishi	69	3,069	3
5	JO1	"Infinity (無限大)"	1 INFINITY	202	Rapper 2	Shunsei Ota	17	3,017	21
5	JO1	"Infinity (無限大)"	2 SIX PLANETS	183	Main Vocal	**Shinsuke Yotsuya**	10		51
5	JO1	"Infinity (無限大)"	2 SIX PLANETS	183	Sub Vocal 1	Naoki Kose	36		37
5	JO1	"Infinity (無限大)"	2 SIX PLANETS	183	Sub Vocal 2	Shu Kobori	17		46
5	JO1	"Infinity (無限大)"	2 SIX PLANETS	183	Sub Vocal 3	Daigo Kobayashi	22		44
5	JO1	"Infinity (無限大)"	2 SIX PLANETS	183	Rapper 1	Shogo Tajima	39		34
5	JO1	"Infinity (無限大)"	2 SIX PLANETS	183	Rapper 2	Renta Nishijima	59		30

== Position Battle Evaluation Performances (Episode 6-7) ==
Color key

- Winner
- Leader
- Center
- Leader and Center

The first-place trainee in each group will receive a bonus of 10,000 votes, with the exception of the hidden song, where the first place will gain a 20,000 vote bonus. The first-place trainee overall in each category will receive a 100,000 vote bonus.

Performance				Team		Contestant				Ranking				
#	Position	Artist	Song	#	Votes	Position	Name	Votes	Votes with bonus	Song	Vocal	Dance	Rap	Rank
1	Rap	Ken the 390	"Nobody Else"	Dosukoi Club (ドス鯉倶楽部)	336	Main Rapper	Shogo Tajima	115	10,115	1			2	8
1	Rap	Ken the 390	"Nobody Else"	Dosukoi Club (ドス鯉倶楽部)	336	Sub Rapper	Hiroto Nishi	108		3			4	18
1	Rap	Ken the 390	"Nobody Else"	Dosukoi Club (ドス鯉倶楽部)	336	Sub Rapper	Rihito Ikezaki	113		2			3	16
2	Dance	JO1	"OH-EH-OH"	T-changer	614	Main Dancer	Takeru Goto	121		2		10		15
2	Dance	JO1	"OH-EH-OH"	T-changer	614	Sub Dancer	Hikaru Vasayegh	92		4		15		24
2	Dance	JO1	"OH-EH-OH"	T-changer	614	Sub Dancer	Nalu Okubo	105		3		12		20
2	Dance	JO1	"OH-EH-OH"	T-changer	614	Sub Dancer	Yudai Sano	88		5		16		26
2	Dance	JO1	"OH-EH-OH"	T-changer	614	Sub Dancer	Jin Matsuda	135	10,135	1		6		6
2	Dance	JO1	"OH-EH-OH"	T-changer	614	Sub Dancer	Kohei Kurita	73		6		18		29
3	Dance	NISSY	"NA"	Na (Natrium)	353	Main Dancer	Wataru Takahashi	146	10,146	1		2		5
3	Dance	NISSY	"NA"	Na (Natrium)	353	Sub Dancer	Masaki Uchida	82		2		17		27
3	Dance	NISSY	"NA"	Na (Natrium)	353	Sub Dancer	Ken Hiramoto	64		3		19		31
3	Dance	NISSY	"NA"	Na (Natrium)	353	Sub Dancer	Rui Iiyoshi	61		4		20		32
4	Vocal	Shota Shimizu	"Hanataba no Kawari ni Melody wo"	X4	426	Main Vocal	Kyosuke Fujimaki	134	10,134	1	2			7
4	Vocal	Shota Shimizu	"Hanataba no Kawari ni Melody wo"	X4	426	Sub Vocal	Shunsei Ota	92		4	8			24
4	Vocal	Shota Shimizu	"Hanataba no Kawari ni Melody wo"	X4	426	Sub Vocal	Anthonny Iinuma	93		3	7			23
4	Vocal	Shota Shimizu	"Hanataba no Kawari ni Melody wo"	X4	426	Sub Vocal	Toma Nakamura	107		2	5			19
5	Dance	SEVENTEEN	"Fallin' Flower"	BUDDIES	656	Main Dancer	Syunji Koike	159	110,159	1		1		1
5	Dance	SEVENTEEN	"Fallin' Flower"	BUDDIES	656	Sub Dancer	Masaya Kimura	144		2		3		10
5	Dance	SEVENTEEN	"Fallin' Flower"	BUDDIES	656	Sub Dancer	Renta Nishijima	121		4		10		15
5	Dance	SEVENTEEN	"Fallin' Flower"	BUDDIES	656	Sub Dancer	Yusei Tekoe	95		5		13		22
5	Dance	SEVENTEEN	"Fallin' Flower"	BUDDIES	656	Sub Dancer	Xu Fengfan	137		3		5		11
6	Vocal	Official Hige Dandism	"Pretender"	Official Challedandism (Officialチャレdism)	348	Main Vocal	Hiromu Takatsuka	111	10,111	1	3			9
6	Vocal	Official Hige Dandism	"Pretender"	Official Challedandism (Officialチャレdism)	348	Sub Vocal	Akihira Matsumoto	44		4	12			35
6	Vocal	Official Hige Dandism	"Pretender"	Official Challedandism (Officialチャレdism)	348	Sub Vocal	Mizuki Shinohara	102		2	6			21
6	Vocal	Official Hige Dandism	"Pretender"	Official Challedandism (Officialチャレdism)	348	Sub Vocal	Ayuta Fukuda	91		3	9			25
7	Rap	Ken the 390	"Overall"	Crawl up	332	Main Rapper	Kaiho Nakano	132	110,132	1			1	3
7	Rap	Ken the 390	"Overall"	Crawl up	332	Sub Rapper	Kenta Muramatsu	60		3			6	33
7	Rap	Ken the 390	"Overall"	Crawl up	332	Sub Rapper	Yuta Izutsu	80		2			5	28
7	Rap	Ken the 390	"Overall"	Crawl up	332	Sub Rapper	Ayumu Owada	60		3			6	33
8	HIDDEN (Dance)	BTS	"Dynamite"	The Fearless Ones (怖いもの知らず)	634	Main Dancer	Takumi Ozaki	142	20,142	1		4		4
8	HIDDEN (Dance)	BTS	"Dynamite"	The Fearless Ones (怖いもの知らず)	634	Sub Dancer	Hiroaki Morii	95		5		13		22
8	HIDDEN (Dance)	BTS	"Dynamite"	The Fearless Ones (怖いもの知らず)	634	Sub Dancer	Shoya Fukuda	135		2		6		12
8	HIDDEN (Dance)	BTS	"Dynamite"	The Fearless Ones (怖いもの知らず)	634	Sub Dancer	Koshin Terao	128		4		9		14
8	HIDDEN (Dance)	BTS	"Dynamite"	The Fearless Ones (怖いもの知らず)	634	Sub Dancer	Daigo Kobayashi	134		3		8		13
9	Vocal	Ikimonogakari	"Sayonara Seishun"	Utautaibakari (うたうたいばかり)	422	Main Vocal	Kouki Sakamoto	147	110,147	1	1			2
9	Vocal	Ikimonogakari	"Sayonara Seishun"	Utautaibakari (うたうたいばかり)	422	Sub Vocal	Hideaki Sasaoka	110		2	4			17
9	Vocal	Ikimonogakari	"Sayonara Seishun"	Utautaibakari (うたうたいばかり)	422	Sub Vocal	Shu Kobori	59		4	11			34
9	Vocal	Ikimonogakari	"Sayonara Seishun"	Utautaibakari (うたうたいばかり)	422	Sub Vocal	Shinsuke Yotsuya	70		3	10			30
9	Vocal	Ikimonogakari	"Sayonara Seishun"	Utautaibakari (うたうたいばかり)	422	Sub Vocal	Masato Ueda	36		5	13			36

== Concept Evaluation Performances (Episode 8) ==
Color key

- Winner
- Leader
- Center
- Leader and Center

Members of each group are selected by audience vote on their official website between the broadcasts of episodes 5 and 6 (May 6 at 11:00 PM to May 11 at 11:59 PM (JST)). The winning group receives a total of 240,000 additional votes that is split based on each contestant's ranking: the contestant with the most votes receives 100,000 votes, while the remaining contestants receive 20,000 votes. The number of live votes and rankings were not announced.

Performance					Contestant		
Concept	Group	Producer	Song	Votes	Position	Name	Bonus
EDM	1 B.Q.N (バキューン)	Lyrics: Jinli (Full8loom), Satoko Aida; Composition: Gloryface (Full8loom), Jinli (Full8loom); Arrangement: Gloryface(Full8loom), yuka(Full8loom), HARRY(Full8loom)	"A.I.M (Alive In My Imagination)"	49	Main Vocal	Hiromu Takatsuka	
EDM	1 B.Q.N (バキューン)	Lyrics: Jinli (Full8loom), Satoko Aida; Composition: Gloryface (Full8loom), Jinli (Full8loom); Arrangement: Gloryface(Full8loom), yuka(Full8loom), HARRY(Full8loom)	"A.I.M (Alive In My Imagination)"	49	Sub Vocal 1	Kyosuke Fujimaki	
EDM	1 B.Q.N (バキューン)	Lyrics: Jinli (Full8loom), Satoko Aida; Composition: Gloryface (Full8loom), Jinli (Full8loom); Arrangement: Gloryface(Full8loom), yuka(Full8loom), HARRY(Full8loom)	"A.I.M (Alive In My Imagination)"	49	Sub Vocal 2	Shoya Fukuda	
EDM	1 B.Q.N (バキューン)	Lyrics: Jinli (Full8loom), Satoko Aida; Composition: Gloryface (Full8loom), Jinli (Full8loom); Arrangement: Gloryface(Full8loom), yuka(Full8loom), HARRY(Full8loom)	"A.I.M (Alive In My Imagination)"	49	Sub Vocal 3	Kohei Kurita	
EDM	1 B.Q.N (バキューン)	Lyrics: Jinli (Full8loom), Satoko Aida; Composition: Gloryface (Full8loom), Jinli (Full8loom); Arrangement: Gloryface(Full8loom), yuka(Full8loom), HARRY(Full8loom)	"A.I.M (Alive In My Imagination)"	49	Rapper 1	Shu Kobori	
EDM	1 B.Q.N (バキューン)	Lyrics: Jinli (Full8loom), Satoko Aida; Composition: Gloryface (Full8loom), Jinli (Full8loom); Arrangement: Gloryface(Full8loom), yuka(Full8loom), HARRY(Full8loom)	"A.I.M (Alive In My Imagination)"	49	Rapper 2	Kenta Muramatsu	
EDM	1 B.Q.N (バキューン)	Lyrics: Jinli (Full8loom), Satoko Aida; Composition: Gloryface (Full8loom), Jinli (Full8loom); Arrangement: Gloryface(Full8loom), yuka(Full8loom), HARRY(Full8loom)	"A.I.M (Alive In My Imagination)"	49	Rapper 3	Hikaru Vasayegh	
EDM	1 B.Q.N (バキューン)	Lyrics: Jinli (Full8loom), Satoko Aida; Composition: Gloryface (Full8loom), Jinli (Full8loom); Arrangement: Gloryface(Full8loom), yuka(Full8loom), HARRY(Full8loom)	"A.I.M (Alive In My Imagination)"	49	Rapper 4	Yusei Tekoe	
Tropical House	2 Freshers	Lyrics: real - fantasy, KINDA, siyun, ZELO, MINAMI; Composition and arrangement: real - fantasy, KINDA, siyun	"Another Day"	53	Main Vocal	Takumi Ozaki	
Tropical House	2 Freshers	Lyrics: real - fantasy, KINDA, siyun, ZELO, MINAMI; Composition and arrangement: real - fantasy, KINDA, siyun	"Another Day"	53	Sub Vocal 1	Toma Nakamura	
Tropical House	2 Freshers	Lyrics: real - fantasy, KINDA, siyun, ZELO, MINAMI; Composition and arrangement: real - fantasy, KINDA, siyun	"Another Day"	53	Sub Vocal 2	Shinsuke Yotsuya	
Tropical House	2 Freshers	Lyrics: real - fantasy, KINDA, siyun, ZELO, MINAMI; Composition and arrangement: real - fantasy, KINDA, siyun	"Another Day"	53	Sub Vocal 3	Ayuta Fukuda	
Tropical House	2 Freshers	Lyrics: real - fantasy, KINDA, siyun, ZELO, MINAMI; Composition and arrangement: real - fantasy, KINDA, siyun	"Another Day"	53	Rapper 1	Masaya Kimura	
Tropical House	2 Freshers	Lyrics: real - fantasy, KINDA, siyun, ZELO, MINAMI; Composition and arrangement: real - fantasy, KINDA, siyun	"Another Day"	53	Rapper 2	Shunsei Ota	
Tropical House	2 Freshers	Lyrics: real - fantasy, KINDA, siyun, ZELO, MINAMI; Composition and arrangement: real - fantasy, KINDA, siyun	"Another Day"	53	Rapper 3	Masaki Uchida	
Tropical House	2 Freshers	Lyrics: real - fantasy, KINDA, siyun, ZELO, MINAMI; Composition and arrangement: real - fantasy, KINDA, siyun	"Another Day"	53	Rapper 4	Rui Iiyoshi	
Trap / Hip Hop	3 Hachimencho (八men鳥)	Lyrics: Bull$EyE, De view, IN]UN, HEEJUN, Greenism, HASEGAWA; Composition: Bull$EyE, De view, IN]UN, HEEJUN, Greenism; Arrangement: Bull$EyE, De view, IN]UN, HEEJUN	"Goosebumps"	84	Main Vocal	Hideaki Sasaoka	+20,000
Trap / Hip Hop	3 Hachimencho (八men鳥)	Lyrics: Bull$EyE, De view, IN]UN, HEEJUN, Greenism, HASEGAWA; Composition: Bull$EyE, De view, IN]UN, HEEJUN, Greenism; Arrangement: Bull$EyE, De view, IN]UN, HEEJUN	"Goosebumps"	84	Sub Vocal 1	Syunji Koike	+20,000
Trap / Hip Hop	3 Hachimencho (八men鳥)	Lyrics: Bull$EyE, De view, IN]UN, HEEJUN, Greenism, HASEGAWA; Composition: Bull$EyE, De view, IN]UN, HEEJUN, Greenism; Arrangement: Bull$EyE, De view, IN]UN, HEEJUN	"Goosebumps"	84	Sub Vocal 2	Masato Ueda	+20,000
Trap / Hip Hop	3 Hachimencho (八men鳥)	Lyrics: Bull$EyE, De view, IN]UN, HEEJUN, Greenism, HASEGAWA; Composition: Bull$EyE, De view, IN]UN, HEEJUN, Greenism; Arrangement: Bull$EyE, De view, IN]UN, HEEJUN	"Goosebumps"	84	Sub Vocal 3	Kaiho Nakano	+20,000
Trap / Hip Hop	3 Hachimencho (八men鳥)	Lyrics: Bull$EyE, De view, IN]UN, HEEJUN, Greenism, HASEGAWA; Composition: Bull$EyE, De view, IN]UN, HEEJUN, Greenism; Arrangement: Bull$EyE, De view, IN]UN, HEEJUN	"Goosebumps"	84	Rapper 1	Shogo Tajima (Note: With 18 live votes, he was announced as the winner.)	+100,000
Trap / Hip Hop	3 Hachimencho (八men鳥)	Lyrics: Bull$EyE, De view, IN]UN, HEEJUN, Greenism, HASEGAWA; Composition: Bull$EyE, De view, IN]UN, HEEJUN, Greenism; Arrangement: Bull$EyE, De view, IN]UN, HEEJUN	"Goosebumps"	84	Rapper 2	Hiroto Nishi	+20,000
Trap / Hip Hop	3 Hachimencho (八men鳥)	Lyrics: Bull$EyE, De view, IN]UN, HEEJUN, Greenism, HASEGAWA; Composition: Bull$EyE, De view, IN]UN, HEEJUN, Greenism; Arrangement: Bull$EyE, De view, IN]UN, HEEJUN	"Goosebumps"	84	Rapper 3	Rihito Ikezaki	+20,000
Trap / Hip Hop	3 Hachimencho (八men鳥)	Lyrics: Bull$EyE, De view, IN]UN, HEEJUN, Greenism, HASEGAWA; Composition: Bull$EyE, De view, IN]UN, HEEJUN, Greenism; Arrangement: Bull$EyE, De view, IN]UN, HEEJUN	"Goosebumps"	84	Rapper 4	Renta Nishijima	+20,000
French House	4 IN (陰)	Lyrics: Jung Hohyun (e.one), Choi Joong Bin (AKB), Lee Man Seong, Ellie Love; Composition: Jung Hohyun (e.one), Choi Joong Bin (AKB), Lee Man Seong; Arrangement: Jung Hohyun (e.one), AKB	"SHADOW (Slip Inside)"	64	Main Vocal	Xu Fengfan	
French House	4 IN (陰)	Lyrics: Jung Hohyun (e.one), Choi Joong Bin (AKB), Lee Man Seong, Ellie Love; Composition: Jung Hohyun (e.one), Choi Joong Bin (AKB), Lee Man Seong; Arrangement: Jung Hohyun (e.one), AKB	"SHADOW (Slip Inside)"	64	Sub Vocal 1	Wataru Takahashi	
French House	4 IN (陰)	Lyrics: Jung Hohyun (e.one), Choi Joong Bin (AKB), Lee Man Seong, Ellie Love; Composition: Jung Hohyun (e.one), Choi Joong Bin (AKB), Lee Man Seong; Arrangement: Jung Hohyun (e.one), AKB	"SHADOW (Slip Inside)"	64	Sub Vocal 2	Jin Matsuda	
French House	4 IN (陰)	Lyrics: Jung Hohyun (e.one), Choi Joong Bin (AKB), Lee Man Seong, Ellie Love; Composition: Jung Hohyun (e.one), Choi Joong Bin (AKB), Lee Man Seong; Arrangement: Jung Hohyun (e.one), AKB	"SHADOW (Slip Inside)"	64	Sub Vocal 3	Akihira Matsumoto	
French House	4 IN (陰)	Lyrics: Jung Hohyun (e.one), Choi Joong Bin (AKB), Lee Man Seong, Ellie Love; Composition: Jung Hohyun (e.one), Choi Joong Bin (AKB), Lee Man Seong; Arrangement: Jung Hohyun (e.one), AKB	"SHADOW (Slip Inside)"	64	Sub Vocal 4	Daigo Kobayashi	
French House	4 IN (陰)	Lyrics: Jung Hohyun (e.one), Choi Joong Bin (AKB), Lee Man Seong, Ellie Love; Composition: Jung Hohyun (e.one), Choi Joong Bin (AKB), Lee Man Seong; Arrangement: Jung Hohyun (e.one), AKB	"SHADOW (Slip Inside)"	64	Sub Vocal 5	Hiroaki Morii	
French House	4 IN (陰)	Lyrics: Jung Hohyun (e.one), Choi Joong Bin (AKB), Lee Man Seong, Ellie Love; Composition: Jung Hohyun (e.one), Choi Joong Bin (AKB), Lee Man Seong; Arrangement: Jung Hohyun (e.one), AKB	"SHADOW (Slip Inside)"	64	Rapper 1	Takeru Goto	
French House	4 IN (陰)	Lyrics: Jung Hohyun (e.one), Choi Joong Bin (AKB), Lee Man Seong, Ellie Love; Composition: Jung Hohyun (e.one), Choi Joong Bin (AKB), Lee Man Seong; Arrangement: Jung Hohyun (e.one), AKB	"SHADOW (Slip Inside)"	64	Rapper 2	Ken Hiramoto	
Dance	5 Honeymoon (はねむぅ～ん)	Lyrics: YOSKE, Alive Knob, Lei Iwasaki; Composition: Minyoung Lee (EastWest), YOSKE, D.stus (1by1), 91.6 (1by1); Arrangement: Minyoung Lee (EastWest), D.stus (1by1), 91.6 (1by1)	"STEP"	54	Main Vocal	Kouki Sakamoto	
Dance	5 Honeymoon (はねむぅ～ん)	Lyrics: YOSKE, Alive Knob, Lei Iwasaki; Composition: Minyoung Lee (EastWest), YOSKE, D.stus (1by1), 91.6 (1by1); Arrangement: Minyoung Lee (EastWest), D.stus (1by1), 91.6 (1by1)	"STEP"	54	Sub Vocal 1	Mizuki Shinohara	
Dance	5 Honeymoon (はねむぅ～ん)	Lyrics: YOSKE, Alive Knob, Lei Iwasaki; Composition: Minyoung Lee (EastWest), YOSKE, D.stus (1by1), 91.6 (1by1); Arrangement: Minyoung Lee (EastWest), D.stus (1by1), 91.6 (1by1)	"STEP"	54	Sub Vocal 2	Koshin Terao	
Dance	5 Honeymoon (はねむぅ～ん)	Lyrics: YOSKE, Alive Knob, Lei Iwasaki; Composition: Minyoung Lee (EastWest), YOSKE, D.stus (1by1), 91.6 (1by1); Arrangement: Minyoung Lee (EastWest), D.stus (1by1), 91.6 (1by1)	"STEP"	54	Sub Vocal 3	Anthonny Iinuma	
Dance	5 Honeymoon (はねむぅ～ん)	Lyrics: YOSKE, Alive Knob, Lei Iwasaki; Composition: Minyoung Lee (EastWest), YOSKE, D.stus (1by1), 91.6 (1by1); Arrangement: Minyoung Lee (EastWest), D.stus (1by1), 91.6 (1by1)	"STEP"	54	Sub Vocal 4	Nalu Okubo	
Dance	5 Honeymoon (はねむぅ～ん)	Lyrics: YOSKE, Alive Knob, Lei Iwasaki; Composition: Minyoung Lee (EastWest), YOSKE, D.stus (1by1), 91.6 (1by1); Arrangement: Minyoung Lee (EastWest), D.stus (1by1), 91.6 (1by1)	"STEP"	54	Sub Vocal 5	Yudai Sano	
Dance	5 Honeymoon (はねむぅ～ん)	Lyrics: YOSKE, Alive Knob, Lei Iwasaki; Composition: Minyoung Lee (EastWest), YOSKE, D.stus (1by1), 91.6 (1by1); Arrangement: Minyoung Lee (EastWest), D.stus (1by1), 91.6 (1by1)	"STEP"	54	Rapper 1	Ayumu Owada	
Dance	5 Honeymoon (はねむぅ～ん)	Lyrics: YOSKE, Alive Knob, Lei Iwasaki; Composition: Minyoung Lee (EastWest), YOSKE, D.stus (1by1), 91.6 (1by1); Arrangement: Minyoung Lee (EastWest), D.stus (1by1), 91.6 (1by1)	"STEP"	54	Rapper 2	Yuta Izutsu	

== Debut Evaluation Performances (Episode 10) ==
Color key

- Leader and Center

Performance			Contestant	
#	Producer	Song	Position	Name
1	Lyrics: SOOYOON, AYUMI KANUMA; Composition: Moon Kim, STAINBOYS; Arrangement: STAINBOYS	"ONE"	Main Vocal	Syunji Koike
1	Lyrics: SOOYOON, AYUMI KANUMA; Composition: Moon Kim, STAINBOYS; Arrangement: STAINBOYS	"ONE"	Sub Vocal 1	Masaya Kimura
1	Lyrics: SOOYOON, AYUMI KANUMA; Composition: Moon Kim, STAINBOYS; Arrangement: STAINBOYS	"ONE"	Sub Vocal 2	Daigo Kobayashi
1	Lyrics: SOOYOON, AYUMI KANUMA; Composition: Moon Kim, STAINBOYS; Arrangement: STAINBOYS	"ONE"	Sub Vocal 3	Shunsei Ota
1	Lyrics: SOOYOON, AYUMI KANUMA; Composition: Moon Kim, STAINBOYS; Arrangement: STAINBOYS	"ONE"	Sub Vocal 4	Anthonny Iinuma
1	Lyrics: SOOYOON, AYUMI KANUMA; Composition: Moon Kim, STAINBOYS; Arrangement: STAINBOYS	"ONE"	Sub Vocal 5	Takeru Goto
1	Lyrics: SOOYOON, AYUMI KANUMA; Composition: Moon Kim, STAINBOYS; Arrangement: STAINBOYS	"ONE"	Sub Vocal 6	Koshin Terao
1	Lyrics: SOOYOON, AYUMI KANUMA; Composition: Moon Kim, STAINBOYS; Arrangement: STAINBOYS	"ONE"	Rapper 1	Renta Nishijima
1	Lyrics: SOOYOON, AYUMI KANUMA; Composition: Moon Kim, STAINBOYS; Arrangement: STAINBOYS	"ONE"	Rapper 2	Hiroto Nishi
1	Lyrics: SOOYOON, AYUMI KANUMA; Composition: Moon Kim, STAINBOYS; Arrangement: STAINBOYS	"ONE"	Rapper 3	Xu Fengfan
1	Lyrics: SOOYOON, AYUMI KANUMA; Composition: Moon Kim, STAINBOYS; Arrangement: STAINBOYS	"ONE"	Rapper 4	Nalu Okubo
2	Lyrics: YHANAEL; Composition: SCORE(13), Meagatone(13), ESBEE, LUKE(13), STEREO14; Arrangement: SCORE(13), Meagatone(13), STEREO14	"RUNWAY"	Main Vocal	Kyosuke Fujimaki
2	Lyrics: YHANAEL; Composition: SCORE(13), Meagatone(13), ESBEE, LUKE(13), STEREO14; Arrangement: SCORE(13), Meagatone(13), STEREO14	"RUNWAY"	Sub Vocal 1	Hiromu Takatsuka
2	Lyrics: YHANAEL; Composition: SCORE(13), Meagatone(13), ESBEE, LUKE(13), STEREO14; Arrangement: SCORE(13), Meagatone(13), STEREO14	"RUNWAY"	Sub Vocal 2	Toma Nakamura
2	Lyrics: YHANAEL; Composition: SCORE(13), Meagatone(13), ESBEE, LUKE(13), STEREO14; Arrangement: SCORE(13), Meagatone(13), STEREO14	"RUNWAY"	Sub Vocal 3	Yudai Sano
2	Lyrics: YHANAEL; Composition: SCORE(13), Meagatone(13), ESBEE, LUKE(13), STEREO14; Arrangement: SCORE(13), Meagatone(13), STEREO14	"RUNWAY"	Sub Vocal 4	Kouki Sakamoto
2	Lyrics: YHANAEL; Composition: SCORE(13), Meagatone(13), ESBEE, LUKE(13), STEREO14; Arrangement: SCORE(13), Meagatone(13), STEREO14	"RUNWAY"	Sub Vocal 5	Jin Matsuda
2	Lyrics: YHANAEL; Composition: SCORE(13), Meagatone(13), ESBEE, LUKE(13), STEREO14; Arrangement: SCORE(13), Meagatone(13), STEREO14	"RUNWAY"	Rapper 1	Rihito Ikezaki
2	Lyrics: YHANAEL; Composition: SCORE(13), Meagatone(13), ESBEE, LUKE(13), STEREO14; Arrangement: SCORE(13), Meagatone(13), STEREO14	"RUNWAY"	Rapper 2	Shogo Tajima
2	Lyrics: YHANAEL; Composition: SCORE(13), Meagatone(13), ESBEE, LUKE(13), STEREO14; Arrangement: SCORE(13), Meagatone(13), STEREO14	"RUNWAY"	Rapper 3	Takumi Ozaki
2	Lyrics: YHANAEL; Composition: SCORE(13), Meagatone(13), ESBEE, LUKE(13), STEREO14; Arrangement: SCORE(13), Meagatone(13), STEREO14	"RUNWAY"	Rapper 4	Kaiho Nakano
