= Maison B =

Japanese Boy Group

- Origin: Japan
- Genres: J-pop, Hip-Hop
- Years active: 2022–present
- Label: Dream Boy
- Spinoffs: roomR
- Members: SHOYA; REIJI; TECO; RICK; HIKARU; MASATO; LYU
- Website: maisonb.jp

Maison B is a Japanese boy group formed and produced by rapper Ken The 390. under the label DREAM BOY. The group was formed August 19, 2022 on the television program THE NEXT UP ~ Tsugi wa Kimida Yo ~ and debuted February 15, 2023 with the EP "Foundations".

== History ==
=== 2022 : Formation and releases ===
The members of Maison B were contestants on Season 2 of the Japanese reality television show Produce 101 Japan (2021), where their future producer Ken The 390 also appeared as a rap trainer.

On May 27, Ken The 390 began airing THE NEXT UP ~ Tsugi wa Kimida Yo ~ on Music Blood, planning to debut five trainees that failed the Produce 101 Japan season two audition. Each episode announced a new member of the unnamed group. The original five announced members were RICK, TECO, LYU, SHOYA and REIJI. HIKARU and MASATO were interviewed and auditioned after SHOYA and REIJI respectively recommended them to Ken The 390. Finally, the group's name was decided along with the lineup on August 11.

A crowdfunding campaign on the Japanese fundraising website Ubgoe was started April 13, promising the release of Maison B's first pre-debut single. After the goal of 3,000,000 was reached, the music video for their first single Bringing Out, as well as releasing both digitally and physically to those that donated.

On November 1, Maison B announced the formation of a sub-unit consisting of members RICK and REIJI named roomR, along with the release of Ken the 390's digital single Anything Goes (feat.roomR) which featured the unit.

On November 18, the group released their second single Masquerade to streaming platforms.

The sub-unit roomR featured on compilation album O.B.S vol.8 on December 1 with their song Reverse. The song is the first song relating to Maison B with lyrics by the members, with RICK and REIJI participating in songwriting for Reverse.

=== 2023: Debut ===
On January 18, Maison B pre-released the music video for the title track to their EP Foundations, as well as releasing it digitally to streaming platforms. The song's lyrics were co-written by Maison B members RICK and REIJI.

The group debuted February 15 with the release of Foundations. The b-side Bye For Now is the first Maison B song with songwriting credits from all of the members.

Foundations ranked 10th on the Oricon daily albums chart for February 14, 2023 and second on the Oricon weekly indie albums chart for February 13 - February 19.

On May 11, 2023, Maison B's sub-unit roomR released the digital single Manifesto.

Maison B's sub-unit roomR released the digital single After Party June 12, 2023.

== Members ==
Credits adapted from Maison B and Produce 101 Japan Season 2 official websites.

- SHOYA (福田 翔也 | Fukuda Shoya) - Vocals
- REIJI - (福島 零士 | Fukushima Reiji) - Rap, member of subunit roomR
- TECO - (テコエ 勇聖 | Tekoe Yusei) - Vocals
- RICK (安江 律久 | Yasue Rick) - Rap, member of subunit roomR
- HIKARU (ヴァサイェガ 光 | Vasayegh Hikaru) - Vocals
- MASATO (上田 将人 | Ueda Masato) - Vocals
- LYU (児玉 龍亮 | Kodama Ryusuke) - Vocals

== Discography ==
=== Singles ===
List of singles, with selected chart positions, showing year released, certifications and album name
| Title | Year | Type | Notes | | | |
|---|---|---|---|---|---|---|
| Title | Year | Type | Bringing Out | 2022 | Single | Released as after crowdfunding goal of 3,000,000 yen was met. |
| Masquerade | 2022 | Digital Single | | | | |
| Paradise | 2023 | Foundations Promotional Single | Released digitally alongside MV a month prior to Foundations' release. | | | |
| Get Loud | 2023 | Digital Single | | | | |
| Where Is The Party | 2023 | Digital Single | | | | |

=== Albums ===
List of albums, with selected chart positions, showing year released, certifications and album name
| Title | Year | Peaks | | Certifications |
| Title | Year | Oricon Daily | Oricon Indie | Certifications |
|---|---|---|---|---|
| Foundations | 2023 | 10 | 2 | N/A |

=== Subunit Release ===
List of sub-unit releases, with participating member(s), showing year released, certifications and album name
| Title | Year | Participating Member(s) | Type | Notes |
|---|---|---|---|---|
| Anything Goes (feat. roomR) | 2022 | REIJI, RICK (roomR) | Single | Digital single by KEN THE 390 that features roomR. |
| Reverse | 2022 | REIJI, RICK (roomR) | Feature on Compilation Album | Feature track on compilation album O.B.S Vol.8. |
| Manifesto | 2023 | REIJI, RICK (roomR) | Single | Digital Single |
| After Party | 2023 | REIJI, RICK (roomR) | Single | Digital single |
| Beyond | 2023 | REIJI, RICK (roomR) | Single | Digital Single |
