= DXTeen =

Japanese boy group

- Genres: J-pop; K-pop
- Years active: 2023–present
- Label: Lapone
- Members: Taichi Taniguchi; Ayuta Fukuda; Koshin Terao; Nalu Okubo; Ken Hiramoto; Shotaro Tanaka
- Website: https://dxteen.com

DXTeen (Japanese: ディエックスティーン, Hepburn: Diekkusutīn; commonly stylised in all caps) is a Japanese boy band formed in 2023 by Lapone Entertainment, a joint venture between Yoshimoto Kogyo and CJ ENM. The group is composed of six members: Taichi Taniguchi, Ayuta Fukuda, Koshin Terao, Nalu Okubo, Ken Hiramoto, and Shotaro Tanaka. They are the first group under Lapone that was not formed through a survival show.

They made their debut on May 10, 2023, with the single "Brand New Day".

== Name ==
DXTeen is short for “Dream X Teen”, where they are aiming for a dream and growing step by step. It expresses the “infinite possibilities” of the six teens who continue to work hard and take on challenges, and contains the meaning of making their dreams bigger even as time passes.

== Members ==
- Taichi Taniguchi (谷口 太一, Taniguchi Taichi) – leader
- Ayuta Fukuda (福田歩汰, Fukuda Ayuta)
- Koshin Terao (寺尾香信, Terao Koshin)
- Nalu Okubo (大久保波留, Ōkubo Naru)
- Ken Hiramoto (平本健, Hiramoto Ken)
- Shotaro Tanaka (田中笑太郎, Tanaka Shōtarō)

== Career ==
=== Pre-debut ===
Taniguchi was a former trainee at n.CH Entertainment. In 2019, he competed in the survival reality show World Klass and was eliminated in the finale, not making it into the final lineup of the boy group TOO. Fukuda, Hiramoto, Terao, and Okubo were on Produce 101 Japan Season 2 and finished in 35th, 34th, 17th, and 12th. Following the show, the quartet were part of the trainee group "Lapone Boys".

=== 2023: Debut with "Brand New Day" ===
DXTeen's debut was announced during a press conference on February 13, 2023. On March 8, they held a pre-debut showcase in the EX Theater Ropppongi concert hall in Tokyo. They made their debut on May 10 with the single "Brand New Day" and performed the single during KCON 2023 Japan on May 13. On May 14, DXTeen held a special radio programme titled DXTeen's Hello Talk! on Tokyo FM. The segment was broadcast again on September 17.

On July 17, the group were appointed the ambassadors of Enoshima's Higashihama Beach to commemorate Marine Day. Their song "Dive" was announced as the beach's official song. The song was added to their second single "First Flight", which was released on September 6. A Korean version of the single's lead track "First Flight" was released and performed on M Countdown on August 10, ahead of the single's release. This marked the group's debut in South Korea .

=== 2024: First tour, "Snowin'", Quest, and "Level Up" ===
On January 18, the group released the schedule of their first tour 1st One Man Live Tour lasting from May 18 to June 9. The tour will occur in Osaka, Fukuoka, and finishing in Tokyo, with additional timings added for their final stop. The tour was later renamed to 1st One Man Live Tour ~Start of Quest~ following the announcement of their first album Quest which is scheduled for release on July 14. DXTeen released their third single "Snowin'" on January 31.

On April 12, it was announced that the group will perform at Rakuten GirlsAward 2024 Spring/Summer which will be held on May 3. Members Okubo and Taniguchi will also appear on the fashion stage. On the 26th the album's pre-release single "Good Luck" was released, with the music video scheduled for release on May 21.

On October 28, the song "Always", a bonus track on the first edition of their first album Quest, was made available for digital download to celebrate the first year anniversary of the group's formation. The song was written by all 6 of the members.

On December 4, the group released their fourth single "Level Up".

== Discography ==
=== Studio albums ===
List of studio albums, showing selected details, chart positions, and sales
Title	Details	Peak chart positions			Sales	Certifications
Title	Details	JPN	JPN Comb.	JPN Hot	Sales	Certifications
Quest	Released: July 17, 2024; Label: Lapone Entertainment; Format: CD, CD+DVD, digital download, streaming; Track listing: 1. "Brand New Day"; 2. "Next"; 3. "First Flight"; 4. "Good Luck"; 5. "Dance On Open World"; 6. "Draw+ing"; 7. "Yum Yum"; 8. "Switch"; 9. "Dreamlike"; 10. "Stars"; 11. "Snowin'"; 12. "Always" (bonus track)	5	5	5	JPN: 28,693	
Heart Beat	Released: March 25, 2026; Label: Universal Sigma; Format: CD, digital download, streaming	2	2	4	JPN: 90,714	RIAJ: Gold (phy.)

=== Singles ===
List of singles, showing year released, selected chart positions, certifications, and album name
Title	Year	Peak chart positions			Sales	Certifications	Album
Title	Year	JPN	JPN Comb.	JPN Hot	Sales	Certifications	Album
"Brand New Day"	2023	5	8	40	JPN: 29,092		Quest
"First Flight"	2023	5	8	14	JPN: 44,322		Quest
"Snowin'"	2024	1	3	14	JPN: 48,417		Quest
"Level Up"	2024	2	3	8	JPN: 44,635		Heart Beat
"Tick-Tack"	2025	2	2	5	JPN: 55,228		Heart Beat
"Mutual Crush" (両片想い)	2025	4	4	5	JPN: 78,825	RIAJ: Gold (phy.)	Heart Beat
"Wanna"	2026	2	2	3	JPN: 96,694	RIAJ: Gold (phy.)	Non-album singles
"Equally in Love" (相思想愛)	2026	—	—	60			Non-album singles

=== Promotional singles ===
List of promotional singles, showing year released, and album name
Title	Year	Album
"Come Over"	2023	"Brand New Day"
"Dive"	2023	"First Flight"
"Firework"	2023	"First Flight"
"Carlendar"	2023	"Snowin'"
"Winter Land"	2024	"Snowin'"
"Love All Star" (with JO1 and INI)	2024	Non-album single
"Good Luck"	2024	Quest
"Dance on Open World"	2024	Quest
"Draw+ing"	2024	Quest
"Always"	2024	Non-album single
"Good Vibes"	2025	"Tick-Tack"
"Change Over"	2025	"Mutual Crush"
"What's the DXTeen"	2025	Non-album single
"Bring the Fire"	2026	Heart Beat
"Spring Love" (ハルコイ)	2026	Heart Beat

== Concert tours ==
=== Tours ===
- DXTEEN 1st One Man Live Tour ~Start of Quest~ (2024)

==== 1st One Man Live Tour ~Start of Quest~ ====
Date	City	Country	Venue
May 18, 2024	Osaka	Japan	Zepp Osaka Bayside
June 6, 2024	Fukuoka	Japan	Zepp Fukuoka
June 9, 2024	Tokyo	Japan	Zepp DiverCity Tokyo

== Filmography ==
=== Television ===
Year	Title	Network	Ref.
2023	DXTEEN ROOM	Music On! TV	
2023	DXTEEN Session Seoul	Fuji TV	

=== Radio ===
Year	Title	Station	Notes	Ref.
2023	DXTEEN's Hello Talk!	Tokyo FM	On May 14 and September 17	

== Awards and nominations ==
Name of the award ceremony, year presented, category, nominee of the award, and the result of the nomination
Award ceremony	Year	Category	Nominee/Work	Result	Ref.
MTV Video Music Awards Japan	2023	Upcoming Dance & Vocal Group	DXTEEN	Won	
