= I Will Be Your Bloom =

2022 Japanese television series

- 君の花になる
- Written by: Erika Yoshida
- Directed by: Toshio Tsuboi; Naoki Katō; Yōhei Miyazaki
- Starring: Tsubasa Honda; Fumiya Takahashi; Ryubi Miyase; Keito Tsuna; Rintarō Hachimura; Shūto Mori; Noa; Co-ki Yamashita
- Music by: Shin Kono
- Country of origin: Japan
- Original language: Japanese
- No. of episodes: 10

Production
- Producers: Jingyi Li; Masako Miyazaki
- Running time: 57 minutes

Original release
- Network: TBS
- Release: October 18 – December 20, 2022

I Will Be Your Bloom (Japanese: 君の花になる, Hepburn: Kimi no Hana ni Naru) is a 2022 Japanese television series. It aired on TBS every Tuesday from October 18, 2022, to December 20, 2022.

== Synopsis ==
Asuka Nakamachi was a high school teacher with the dream of becoming a flower-like teacher who can cheer up anyone, but something caused her to quit her job. After that, she moved in with her older sister Yūri and helped her out with the food wagon she runs. One day, when Yūri and Mitsuo Mitsutani become engaged, Asuka decides to become independent and applies for a job as a dormitory mother, listed as "a job to support young people full of potential". However, it turns out to be the dormitory of 8LOOM, a seven-member boy group that debuted but does not sell well. Moreover, the leader of the group is her former student Dan Sagami.

== Cast and characters ==
=== Main ===
- Tsubasa Honda as Asuka Nakamachi

After quitting her job as a high school teacher, she became the dorm mother for boy group 8LOOM.

==== Members of 8LOOM ====
A boy group under Hanamaki Entertainment. Their fandom name is 8LOOMY.

- Fumiya Takahashi as Dan Sagami

Leader and center of 8LOOM, as well as Asuka's former student. He writes 8LOOM's songs.

- Ryūbi Miyase as Daijirō Naruse

Known as Naru. The youngest member of 8LOOM.

- Keito Tsuna as Yukiya Furumachi

The oldest member of 8LOOM.

- Rintarō Hachimura as Ēji Ichinose

Currently a university student.

- Shūto Mori as Ryūsei Hiyama
- Noa as Takumi Kurushima
- Co-ki Yamashita as Takara Onodera

=== Supporting ===
==== People around Asuka Nakamachi ====
- Haruka Kinami as Yūri Nakamachi

Asuka's older sister and a fan of Naru.

- Tatsuhiro Kikuta as Mitsuo Mitsutani

Yūri's fiancé and a fan of Takumi.

- Gōki Maeda as Kōjirō Iketani

A high school teacher and Asuka's former colleague.

==== Hanamaki Entertainment ====
- Mari Natsuki as Yuki Hanamaki

President of Hanamaki Entertainment.

- Mamoru Miyano as Kenji Soegi

8LOOM's manager.

- Yuki Uchida as Sumire Kōsaka

Chayney's manager.

- Naoto Takenaka as Trinity Kasuga

Mysterious person involved with Hanamaki Entertainment.

==== Chayney ====
8LOOM's rival group.

- Masaya Kimura (INI) as Minato
- Hiromu Takatsuka (INI) as Yuzu
- Shogo Tajima (INI) as Ibuki
- Kyosuke Fujimaki (INI) as Shūhei
- Jin Matsuda (INI) as Nayuta

==== People around 8LOOM ====
- Sara Shida as Nao Ikeoka

A girl who runs a public bathhouse that 8LOOM go to.

- Asuka Kawazu as Ririka

Weather caster affiliated with Hanamaki Entertainment, and a fan of 8LOOM.

=== Guest ===
- Masashi Ikeda as Ryōsuke Higashi (Episodes 1, 6–7)

Former member of 8LOOM who left when the group was still unknown. Also Dan's high school classmate and Asuka's former student.

- Yuki Kaji as Toshi (Episode 3–4)

A civil servant whose hobby is cleaning. Kenji Soegi's lover.

- Hikakin as an unnamed 8LOOMY (Episode 5)
- Takashi Tsukamoto as Sō Toyotaka (Episodes 1, 6–7)

A high school teacher and Asuka's former colleague. He opposed Dan joining Hanamaki Entertainment when the latter was in high school.

- Rin Kataoka as Natta (Episode 7)

Female high school student involved in the incident that caused Asuka to quit her job as a teacher.

== Production ==
Prior to the actual broadcast, it was decided that Netflix would distribute it both domestically and internationally as part of a three-series deal between Netflix and TBS. This makes I Will Be Your Bloom the second TBS drama to be distributed on the platform after Japan Sinks: People of Hope in October 2021.

Erika Yoshida wrote the screenplay.

== 8LOOM ==
8LOOM debuted as a band outside of the television series, releasing their debut single "Come Again" on September 21, 2022. The group attended or performed at events like the 2022 Autumn/Winter GirlsAward, KCON 2022 Japan, TikTok Awards Japan 2022, and the 2022 Mnet Japan Fan's Choice Awards. In November, the group held their first live house tour titled I Will Be Your Bloom "Let's 8LOOM" Tour: First and Last. 8LOOM won the Special Award at the 114th The Television Drama Academy Awards. The band held their second and final live tour from December 2 to 4 titled I Will Be Your Bloom "Let's 8LOOM" Tour: The Final. From December 21 to 27, the group held a fan meeting "Thank You 8LOOMY" at IHI Stage Around Tokyo.

=== 8LOOM (album) ===
8LOOM

Compilation album by 8LOOM
- Released: December 21, 2022
- Genre: J-pop
- Length: 38:11
- Label: Virgin Music
- Producers: UTA; Ie-Mon; Musoh; Andreas Öhrn

Singles from 8LOOM
- 1. "Come Again" Released: September 21, 2022; 2. "I Will Be Your Bloom" Released: October 19, 2022; 3. "Melody" Released: November 9, 2022; 4. "Hikari" Released: November 23, 2022; 5. "Forever or Never" Released: December 7, 2022

The group released their eponymous album on December 21, 2022, containing their previous five singles.

==== Background ====
8LOOM released their debut digital single "Come Again" on September 21, 2022, under Virgin Music. Tomoyuki Mori, writing for Billboard Japan, described it as "fresh and light, yet at the same time melancholic, with a pleasant, bouncy feel." On Billboard Japan's charts, the song charted 50th on the Japan Hot 100 chart, 23rd on Download Songs, and 46th on Streaming Songs; on Oricon's charts, the single ranked 23rd on the Digital Singles Chart and 47th on the Streaming Chart.

"I Will Be Your Bloom" served as the theme song for the television series, and was released on October 19, 2022, as 8LOOM's second digital single. On Billboard Japan's charts, the single charted 49th on the Japan Hot 100 chart, 37th on Download Songs, and 35th on Streaming Songs; on Oricon's charts, the single ranked 45th on the Singles Chart, 37th on the digital singles chart, and 33rd on the Streaming Chart.

"Melody" was released on November 9, 2022, as the group's third single; they also performed it in the fourth episode of the television series. On Billboard Japan's Charts, the single charted 32nd on the Japan Hot 100 chart, 16th on Download Songs, 21st on Streaming Songs; on Oricon's charts, the song ranked 25th on the Singles Chart, 16th on the Digital Singles Chart, 19th on the Streaming Chart.

"Hikari" was released on November 23, 2022, as the groups fourth single; they performed it in the sixth episode of the television series. Mori of Billboard Japan described it as a song that "balances all the best features of 8LOOM."

"Forever or Never" was released on December 7, 2022, as 8LOOM's fifth and final single.

==== Tracklist ====
All music is composed by UTA unless otherwise noted.

No.	Title	Lyrics	Music	Length
1.	"Come Again"	Ie-Mon	Ie-Mon; Musoh; Andreas Öhrn	3:45
2.	"Melody"	JUN		3:14
3.	"Hikari"	UTA; Akira; Sunny Boy		4:03
4.	"Forever or Never"	Yohei		4:01
5.	"I Will Be Your Bloom"	UTA; JUN		4:04
6.	"Come Again" (Instrumental)		Ie-Mon; Musoh; Andreas Öhrn	3:44
7.	"Melody" (Instrumental)			3:12
8.	"Hikari" (Instrumental)			4:03
9.	"Forever or Never" (Instrumental)			4:01
10.	"I Will Be Your Bloom" (Instrumental)			4:04
Total length:				38:11

==== Charts ====
Weekly chart performance for 8LOOM
Chart (2022)	Peak position
Japan Digital Albums (Oricon)	7
Japan Download Albums (Billboard Japan)	7
Japan Hot Albums (Billboard Japan)	40

== Reception ==
Tsubasa Honda's acting was panned by both the audience and critics. Upon the release of the first episode, the hashtag "TsubasaHondaIsBadAtActing" (本田翼演技下手) trended in Japan on Twitter. Josei Jishin named I Will Be Your Bloom as the most disappointing drama of 2022 in part due to Honda's acting.
