= Masaya Kimura (singer) =

Japanese singer (born 1997)

- 木村 柾哉
- Born: October 10, 1997 (age 29); Nagoya, Japan
- Education: Nihon Kogakuin College
- Occupations: Singer; dancer; actor
- Years active: 2018–present
- Musical career
- Genres: J-pop; K-pop
- Instrument: Vocals
- Label: Lapone
- Member of: INI
- Website: Official website

Japanese name
- Kanji: 木村 柾哉
- Hiragana: きむら まさや
- Romanization: Kimura Masaya

Korean name
- Hangul: 키무라 마사야
- Revised Romanization: Kimura Masaya
- McCune–Reischauer: K'imura Masaya

Masaya Kimura (木村 柾哉, Kimura Masaya; born October 10, 1997) is a Japanese singer, dancer, and actor. He debuted as a member and leader of the Japanese boy band INI in 2021 after placing first in the second season of Produce 101 Japan. He made his debut as an actor in the television series I Will Be Your Bloom (2022) and made his film debut with Atashi no! (2024).

== Personal life ==
Masaya Kimura was born on October 10, 1997, in Nagoya, Aichi Prefecture, Japan.

== Career ==
=== Pre-debut ===
Kimura was initially influenced to learn dancing by his brother, who was a dancer. In 2013, while in high school Kimura was introduced to K-pop and was convinced by his classmates to join the school's dance club. In August 2015, he won second place in the Mr.Solo category of the National High School Dance Drill Championship 2015 and competed in the International division in Los Angeles. After graduating from high school, he studied dance for two years at Nihon Kogakuin College (日本工学院) majoring in hip hop and jazz.

Following graduation, Kimura worked as a back-up dancer and appeared in the works of lol and Seventeen in 2018 and worked alongside Ren Kawashiri of JO1 to form a dance unit. Between 2019 and 2020, Kimura worked as a dance instructor and choreographer at Noa Dance Academy, specialising in R&B and hip hop. He helped choreograph Battle Boys' "Sha na na" (2018), ChocoLate Bomb!!'s "Feedback" (2019), Party Party's "Carry on Carry on" (2019), and King & Prince's "&Love" (2020) and "Cinderella Girl" (2021). While working as a dance instructor in 2018, he taught Jyutaro Yamanaka, who was then a member of Ebidan.

=== 2020–2021: Produce 101 Japan and debut in INI ===
In November 2020, applications for the second season of Produce 101 Japan, the Japanese spin-off of the South Korean Produce 101 franchise, opened. After being encouraged to participate by previous contestants from the first season, Kimura auditioned for the show which began airing in April 2021. The finale was broadcast on June 13, where Kimura placed first with a total of 380,796 votes. The final group was named INI and on September 4, Kimura was selected as the group's leader. After undergoing training in South Korea the group made their debut on November 3 with the single A.

Kimura created the choreography for INI's "Killing Part" alongside bandmate Hiroto Nishi, which was included in the group's debut single.

=== 2022–present: Solo activities and acting debut ===
In 2022, Kimura played the role of Minato, a member of the rival group Chayney, in the TBS television series I Will Be Your Bloom which ran from October to December. Kimura played alongside bandmates Tajima, Takatsuka, Fujimaki and Matsuda, marking his acting debut.

In 2023 Kimura choreographed INI's "Moment", and "You In" from the group's single Tag Me. He was also appointed the presenter of Mezamashi TV for the month of December, appearing every week from the 7th until the 25th. Upon his first appearance, Kimura became one of the top 3 trending topics on X's (formally Twitter) Japan Trends.

On June 6, 2024, it was announced that Kimura will star in the movie Atashi no! (あたしの!), which will be released on November 8. The film is a live-action adaptation of the manga series "Atashi no!", which was published from 2017 to 2018 by Momoko Koda. Kimura will play the role of Mitomo Naomi, a popular student that caught the eyes of the two female characters.

A year later, on June 24, 2025, it was confirmed that Kimura will play the role of Junta Hayami in the movie adaptation of the manga series Romantic Killer which is set to be released in theaters on December 12. On December 17, he released his first single "Tsunagu" (ツナグ) as part of INI's YouTube project titled INI Studio. The single was co-written by Kimura.

On February 17, 2026, it was announced that Kimura will play the role of Sakurazaki Akito in the TV series Stove League, which will begin streaming on March 28. Stove League is the Japanese remake of the South Korean TV series Hot Stove League which was aired in 2019. On August 27, he was appointed as the brand ambassador of SISI, a Japanese beauty and skincare brand.

== Discography ==
=== Singles ===
List of singles as lead artist, showing year released, selected chart positions and album name
Title	Year	Peak chart positions	Sales	Album
Title	Year	JPN Hot	Sales	Album
"Breath" (with Takumi, Takeru, Yudai, and Kyosuke)	2025	— (Note: "Breath" did not enter the Billboard Japan Hot 100, but debuted and peaked at number 5 on the component Download Chart.)	JPN: 5,774 (dig.)	Non-album single
"Tsunagu" (ツナグ)	2025	— (Note: "Tsunagu" did not enter the Billboard Japan Hot 100, but debuted and peaked at number 48 on the component Download Chart.)	JPN: 683 (dig.)	Non-album single
"—" denotes releases that did not chart or were not released in that region.

== Filmography ==
=== Film ===
Year	Title	Role	Notes	Ref.
2024	You Are Mine!	Mitomo Naomi	Lead role	
2025	Romantic Killer	Junta Hayami	Lead role	
2027	The High School Family	Seitaro Naruse		

=== Television series ===
Year	Title	Role	Notes	Ref.
2022	I Will Be Your Bloom	Minato		
2026	Stove League	Sakurazaki Akito		

=== Television shows ===
Year	Title	Role	Notes	Ref.
2020	Produce 101 Japan season 2	Contestant	Finished first place as a member of INI	
2023	Mezamashi TV	Presenter	For the month of December	

=== Music video appearances ===
Year	Title	Artist(s)	Ref.
2018	"Ice Cream"	lol	
2018	"Idaten Dreamer"	Taisei Miyakawa	
2019	"Too Good"	Akira Takano	
2019	"It's My Bad"	Akira Takano	
2020	"超展開 Japanese ver. (feat. Lead)"	GBOYSWAG	
2020	"E-S-C-A-P-E"	Sonomi Tameoka	
2020	"Tora"	Maki	
2021	"Get You Back"	Takahiro Nishijima	
