= Produce 101 Japan season 2 =

2021 Japanese reality competition show

Produce 101 Japan
- Season 2
- Native name
- Katakana: プロデュース ワンオーワン ジャパン
Transcriptions
- Romanization: Purodyūsu Wanōwan Japan
- No. of episodes: 10 + 2 specials

Release
- Original network: TBS; GyaO!
- Original release: April 8 – June 13, 2021

Season chronology
- ← Previous; Season 1 Next → Season 3 (The Girls)

Produce 101 Japan is a Japanese reality competition show bringing 101 trainees with the intention of producing an 11-member permanent boy band. Premiering on April 8, 2021, the second season is being broadcast on GyaO! every Thursday at 9 pm JST (GMT+9). The show is being streamed on YouTube every Friday at 9 pm JST (GMT+9) with English subtitles available in certain countries.

The series is an official spin-off of the South Korean television series Produce 101 and is a co-production between Yoshimoto Kogyo and CJ E&M. Weekly highlights are also being aired on TBS.

The top 11 winners debuted under the name INI.

== Background ==
In November 2020, Yoshimoto Kogyo and CJ E&M announced they would be co-producing a 2nd Japanese version of the Produce 101 reality competition show with the intention of debuting an 11-member boy band in 2021 for the global music market. The group created from the show would be permanent and would be handled by Lapone Entertainment. Auditions for the show took place from December 4 to Dec 6, 2020, for male Japanese residents aged 15–27 years old who were not tied to any talent agency. On January 30, 2021, all 101 trainees profiles were revealed and Fuma Murata was shown to have withdrawn; the show's theme song, "Let Me Fly" was also revealed. Prior to the show's airing, another contestant, Fujisawa dropped out, totaling two withdrawing and leaving 99 trainees to compete on the show.

== Cast ==
The show was presented by Hideyuki Yabe and Takashi Okumura of the comedy duo Ninety-nine, who had previously hosted the Asayan talent competition series in 1999.

Vocal trainers

- Thelma Aoyama
- Hidenori Sugai

Dance trainers

- Rino Nakasone
- KENZO (DA PUMP)

Rap trainer

- KEN THE 390

== Contestants ==
=== Elimination chart ===
Colors key

Final members of INI
Contestants eliminated in the Finale
Contestants eliminated in the second elimination round
Contestants eliminated in the first elimination round
Contestants eliminated in the Episode 0
Contestants left the show

101 Contestants
Masaya Kimura (木村 柾哉)	Hiromu Takatsuka (髙塚 大夢)	Shogo Tajima (田島 将吾)	Kyosuke Fujimaki (藤牧 京介)	Takumi Ozaki (尾崎 匠海)
Hiroto Nishi (西 洸人)	Jin Matsuda (松田 迅)	Xu Fengfan (許 豊凡)	Rihito Ikezaki (池﨑 理人)	Yudai Sano (佐野 雄大)
Takeru Goto (後藤 威尊)	Nalu Okubo (大久保 波留)	Daigo Kobayashi (小林 大悟)	Shunsei Ota (太田 駿静)	Syunji Koike (小池 俊司)
Renta Nishijima (西島 蓮汰)	Koshin Terao (寺尾 香信)	Anthonny Iinuma (飯沼 アントニー)	Kaiho Nakano (中野 海帆)	Toma Nakamura (仲村 冬馬)
Kouki Sakamoto (阪本 航紀)	Shinsuke Yotsuya (四谷 真佑)	Kohei Kurita (栗田 航兵)	Shu Kobori (小堀 柊)	Hideaki Sasaoka (笹岡 秀旭)
Yuta Izutsu (井筒 裕太)	Masaki Uchida (内田 正紀)	Mizuki Shinohara (篠原 瑞希)	Hiroaki Morii (森井 洸陽)	Wataru Takahashi (髙橋 航大)
Kenta Muramatsu (村松 健太)	Shoya Fukuda (福田 翔也)	Hikaru Vasayegh (ヴァサイェガ 光)	Ken Hiramoto (平本 健)	Ayuta Fukuda (福田 歩汰)
Ayumu Owada (大和田 歩夢)	Rui Iiyoshi (飯吉 流生)	Masato Ueda (上田 将人)	Yusei Tekoe (テコエ 勇聖)	Akihira Matsumoto (松本 旭平)
Naoki Kose (古瀬 直輝)	Ryoma Kitayama (北山 龍磨)	Ayumu Shinogaya (篠ヶ谷 歩夢)	Takahiro Uehara (上原 貴博)	Norihiko Miyashita (宮下 紀彦)
Haruki Yamamoto (山本 遥貴)	Rick Yasue (安江 律久)	Daisuke Tawada (多和田 大祐)	Tsukasa Sakuma (佐久間 司紗)	Tenki Misasagawa (三佐々川 天輝)
Ibuki Hattori (服部 息吹)	Sera Fujimoto (藤本 世羅)	Ryusuke Kodama (児玉 龍亮)	Raia Edamoto (枝元 雷亜)	Renya Naitou (内藤 廉哉)
Muta Azumi (安積 夢大)	Reiji Fukushima (福島 零士)	Tomoki Nishiyama (西山 知輝)	Hajime Abe (阿部 創)	Yuto Furue (古江 侑豊)
Reo Okada (岡田 玲旺)	Hiroki Kajita (梶田 拓希)	Tomoki Nishiyama (西山 智樹)	Ren Okamoto (岡本 怜)	Haruto Tsuboi (坪井 悠斗)
Katsuhisa Ikemoto (池本 勝久)	Yuki Miura (三浦 由暉)	Daisuke Morisaki (森崎 大祐)	Shogo Kokubu (国分 翔悟)	Kaito Kawamura (川村 海斗)
Kazuma Iwata (岩田 和真)	Shogo Noji (野地 章吾)	Julio Taichiro Shima (島フリオ太一郎)	Raito Sato (佐藤 頼輝)	Sota Hori (堀 蒼太)
Tomoki Fuji (藤 智樹)	Hitoru Hashimoto (橋本 瞳瑠)	Kaito Dozono (堂園 海翔)	Naoki Tsunematsu (恒松 尚輝)	Towa Miyazaki (宮崎 永遠)
Yusuke Tagawa (田川 祐輔)	Syogo Mukoyama (向山 翔悟)	Hiromu Honda (本多 大夢)	Daichi Kato (加藤 大地)	Neo Yoshii (吉井 寧皇)
Haruki Arai (新井 遥紀)	Yuto Shimizu (清水 裕斗)	Yuri Ikeda (池田 悠里)	Shosuke Taka (髙 昇舗)	Yuuto Sakai (酒井 優人)
Haruto Tsurufugi (鶴藤 遥大)	Hideki Yamada (山田 英樹)	Niji Kojima (古島 虹)	Rintaro Orihara (折原 凛太郎)	Tomohiro Nakano (中野 智博)
Shoma Yoshida (吉田 翔馬)	Takumi Fujihara (藤原 拓海)	Kenta Marubayashi (丸林 健太)	Misaki Tomizawa (冨澤 岬樹)	Hibiki Fujisawa (藤沢 響己)
Fuma Murata (村田 風雅)				

== Episodes ==
No.	Title	Original release date
0	"Episode 0"	April 1, 2021
The ranking announcement for the top 60 trainees is aired, with trainees ranked 61-101 being eliminated. All trainees also voted for the top 3 of 5 positions. (Visual, Fashion, Dance, Rap and Vocal) and other positions.: Visual: Yudai Sano, Shunsei Ota and Hiroaki Morii; Fashion: Hiroto Nishi, Rihito Ikezaki and Takeru Goto; Dance: Hiroto Nishi, Shogo Tajima and Masaya Kimura; Rap: Shogo Tajima, Kaiho Nakano and Renta Nishijima; Vocal: Kyosuke Fujimaki, Anthonny Iinuma and Hiromu Takatsuka
1	"Episode 1"	April 8, 2021
The 1st ranking announcement for the 60 trainees begins, with the studio having seats arranged in a pyramid numbered 1 to 60. Each trainee sits on the seat corresponding to their current rank, with Masaya Kimura taking 1st place. The trainees also perform their audition songs by team, and each trainee is graded individually from A to F, based on their overall talents, organizing them into temporary classes for training.
2	"Episode 2"	April 15, 2021
The trainees practice the choreography for the theme song, "Let Me Fly (～その未来へ～)", after which they will undergo a re-evaluation and have their grades reassigned. The contestants film themselves performing the song individually. Each video is then watched and evaluated by the mentors. The boys are then given their new grades.
3	"Episode 3"	April 22, 2021
The trainees vote for their center pick for the theme song from the new set of A-class trainees, with Masaya Kimura chosen to be the center. The first evaluation, the Group Battle, is announced, and they are organized into 10 teams of 6 members each; 2 teams compete against each other on a pop song. The options are "I Need U" by BTS, "AGEHA" by Generations from Exile Tribe, "&LOVE" by King & Prince, "Your Number" by SHINee, and "Infinity" by JO1. The teams practice and then perform the songs, with each individual being voted on separately by the studio audience, and with the members on the winning team for their song receiving a bonus of 3,000 votes.
4	"Episode 4"	April 29, 2021
The rehearsals and performances of the rest of the teams are shown. Hiromu Takatsuka takes 1st place and is further revealed to have taken first place overall as his team won the group battle.
5	"Episode 5"	May 6, 2021
The events leading to the 1st elimination are shown. The trainees reveal their nightly routine at their hotel rooms through vlogs. Trainees vote for their visual picks, with Hiroto Nishi, Renta Nishijima, and Hiroaki Morii voted as the top 3. The first round of elimination takes place. Anthonny Iinuma, Nalu Okubo, Takeru Goto, Hiromu Takatsuka, Yudai Sano, Renta Nishijima, Takumi Ozaki and Hiroto Nishi take 11th to 3rd places, respectively. Masaya Kimura and Shogo Tajima are revealed to be the top 2 trainees, with Masaya Kimura being voted 1st with 1,476,946 votes. Masaki Uchida and Wataru Takahashi are revealed to be the candidates for 40th place, with Masaki Uchida taking 40th place. Trainees ranked 41-60 are eliminated. Naoki Kose reveals that he has dropped out from the competition due to complications caused by COVID-19; resulting in Wataru, the 41st placer, being saved and continuing on to the second round.
6	"Episode 6"	May 13, 2021
The next evaluation is announced to be the position battles. The trainees are tasked to perform live in groups, based in positions they choose: vocal, dance, or rap. There are 3 songs for vocals (Ikimonogakari's "Sayonara Seishun", Shota Shimizu's "Hanataba no Kawari ni Melody wo", & Official Hige Dandism's "Pretender"), 3 songs for dance (Seventeen's "Fallin' Flower", Nissy's "NA", JO1's "Oh-Eh-Oh"), 2 songs for rap (Ken the 390's "Overall" and "Nobody Else"), and 1 hidden song (later revealed to be BTS' "Dynamite"). The first-place trainee in each group will receive a bonus of 10,000 votes, with the exception of the hidden song, where the first place will gain a 20,000 vote bonus. The first-place trainee overall in each category will receive a 100,000 vote bonus. The practices and performances of several teams are also aired in this episode.
7	"Episode 7"	May 20, 2021
The remaining position battles are shown. In the second half of the episode, the trainees gather again to reveal their new rankings, with many high-ranked trainees dropping. It is also announced that there will be no elimination for this round, and all 40 trainees will perform in the concept evaluations.
8	"Episode 8"	May 27, 2021
This episode shows the live performances for the concept evaluations. "Goosebumps" group takes 1st place, with Shogo Tajima being the member with the most votes. "Shadow" group came in 2nd, "Step" came in 3rd, "Another Day" came in 4th and "A.I.M" came in last.
9	"Episode 9"	June 3, 2021
The 2nd eliminations take place, with the top 20 trainees moving on to the finals. Shogo Tajima and Masaya Kimura are revealed to be top 2, with Shogo being confirmed as the 1st place. Koshin Terao is announced to be in 20th place. The top global producers' pick is revealed to be Kouki Sakamoto, saving him from elimination.
10	"Episode 10"	June 13, 2021
The finale starts off with the reveal of the group name, which was "INI". The final debut evaluation performances commence, in which Masaya Kimura is revealed as the center for "ONE" and Toma Nakamura as the center for "RUNWAY". They also perform the final ballad song "One Day". The top 21 trainees then perform the theme song "Let Me Fly". The boys are also shown their audition tapes as well as messages from their loved ones. Voting soon comes to a close, and ranking announcements begin. The ranking announcement started from the contestant who ranked at 10th place which was Yudai Sano, followed by Rihito Ikezaki at 9th, Xu Fengfan at 8th, Jin Matsuda at 7th, Hiroto Nishi at 6th, Takumi Ozaki at 5th, Kyosuke Fujimaki at 4th, and Shogo Tajima at 3rd, confirming them to debut. The top 2 trainees are revealed to be Masaya Kimura and Hiromu Takatsuka, with Masaya Kimura taking 1st place. It was then announced that the 11th and final member of the debut lineup was Takeru Goto.

== Rankings ==
The top 11 contestants, which determined the members of the final group, were chosen through popularity online voting at Produce 101 Japan GyaO!'s homepage, AR square app, VR square app and audience's live voting. The results were shown at the end of each episode.

For the on:tact, first voting period, viewers were allowed to select 11 trainees per vote. For the second round, the system changed to 2 trainee per vote. For the final round, the system changed to 1 trainee per vote and added live online votes.

New Top 11
Comeback to Top 11

#	Top 60	Episode 2	Episode 3	Episode 5	Episode 6	Episode 7	Episode 9	Episode 10
1	Masaya Kimura	Shogo Tajima (▲1)	Masaya Kimura (▲1)	Masaya Kimura	Masaya Kimura	Shogo Tajima (▲1)	Shogo Tajima	Masaya Kimura (▲1)
2	Shogo Tajima	Masaya Kimura (▼1)	Shogo Tajima (▼1)	Shogo Tajima	Shogo Tajima	Masaya Kimura (▼1)	Masaya Kimura	Hiromu Takatsuka (▲15)
3	Yudai Sano	Hiroto Nishi (▲1)	Hiroto Nishi	Kyosuke Fujimaki (▲1)	Renta Nishijima (▲3)	Kyosuke Fujimaki (▲2)	Kyosuke Fujimaki	Shogo Tajima (▼2)
4	Hiroto Nishi	Kyosuke Fujimaki (▲8)	Kyosuke Fujimaki	Hiroto Nishi (▼1)	Hiroto Nishi	Syunji Koike (▲6)	Renta Nishijima (▲2)	Kyosuke Fujimaki (▼1)
5	Takeru Goto	Yudai Sano (▼2)	Takumi Ozaki (▲1)	Takumi Ozaki	Kyosuke Fujimaki (▼2)	Hiroto Nishi (▼1)	Hiroto Nishi	Takumi Ozaki (▲3)
6	Shunsei Ota	Takumi Ozaki (▲8)	Yudai Sano (▼1)	Renta Nishijima (▲1)	Daigo Kobayashi (▲16)	Renta Nishijima (▼3)	Syunji Koike (▼2)	Hiroto Nishi (▼1)
7	Xu Fengfan	Renta Nishijima (▲3)	Renta Nishijima	Yudai Sano (▼1)	Takumi Ozaki (▼2)	Daigo Kobayashi (▼1)	Daigo Kobayashi	Jin Matsuda (▲7)
8	Hiromu Takatsuka	Nalu Okubo (▲5)	Nalu Okubo	Hiromu Takatsuka (▲4)	Yudai Sano (▼1)	Takumi Ozaki (▼1)	Takumi Ozaki	Xu Fengfan (▲11)
9	Anthonny Iinuma	Takeru Goto (▼4)	Anthonny Iinuma (▲2)	Takeru Goto (▲2)	Hiromu Takatsuka (▼1)	Kaiho Nakano (▲14)	Yudai Sano (▲3)	Rihito Ikezaki (▲4)
10	Renta Nishijima	Xu Fengfan (▼3)	Xu Fengfan	Nalu Okubo (▼2)	Syunji Koike (▲16)	Kouki Sakamoto (▲9)	Shunsei Ota (▲1)	Yudai Sano (▼1)
11	Rihito Ikezaki	Anthonny Iinuma (▼2)	Takeru Goto (▼2)	Anthonny Iinuma (▼2)	Koshin Terao (▲2)	Shunsei Ota (▲6)	Takeru Goto (▲3)	Takeru Goto

=== ON:TACT voting period ===
The ON:TACT voting period took place between February 1 at 12 am and February 10 at 11:59 pm (JST).

#	Episode 0–1 (Online votes)
1	Masaya Kimura
2	Shogo Tajima
3	Yudai Sano
4	Hiroto Nishi
5	Takeru Goto
6	Shunsei Ota
7	Xu Fengfan
8	Hiromu Takatsuka
9	Anthonny Iinuma
10	Renta Nishijima
11	Rihito Ikezaki

=== First voting period ===
The first voting period took place between April 8 at 9 am and April 30 at 5 am (JST). The total number of votes accumulated was 25,355,977.

#	Episode 2 (Online votes)	Episode 3 (Online votes)	Episode 4 (Live votes)		Episode 5 (Total votes)	
#	Episode 2 (Online votes)	Episode 3 (Online votes)	Name	Votes	Name	Votes
1	Shogo Tajima	Masaya Kimura	Hiromu Takatsuka	3,108	Masaya Kimura	1,476,946
2	Masaya Kimura	Shogo Tajima	Nalu Okubo	3,078	Shogo Tajima	1,402,055
3	Yudai Sano	Hiroto Nishi	Hiroto Nishi	3,069	Kyosuke Fujimaki	1,135,900
4	Hiroto Nishi	Kyosuke Fujimaki	Kaiho Nakano	3,067	Hiroto Nishi	1,128,968
5	Yudai Sano	Takumi Ozaki	Haruki Yamamoto	3,064	Takumi Ozaki	1,087,177
6	Takumi Ozaki	Yudai Sano	Hiroaki Morii	3,058	Renta Nishijima	975,241
7	Renta Nishijima	Renta Nishijima	Mizuki Shinohara	3,056	Yudai Sano	966,407
8	Nalu Okubo	Nalu Okubo	Kenta Muramatsu	3,045	Hiromu Takatsuka	899,044
9	Takeru Goto	Anthonny Iinuma	Tomoki Nishiyama	3,043	Takeru Goto	843,923
10	Xu Fengfan	Xu Fengfan	Jin Matsuda	3,041	Nalu Okubo	829,447
11	Anthonny Iinuma	Takeru Goto	Kyosuke Fujimaki	3,040	Anthonny Iinuma	761,184

Notes

- On Episode 4, an additional 3,000 points were given to all the members of the winning groups, which were combined with the votes given by the live audience.
- The ranking for Episode 5 is the result of combining online votes and live votes from the previous episode.

=== Second voting period ===
The second voting period took place between May 6 at 11 pm and May 28 at 5 am (JST). The total number of votes accumulated was 9,285,810.

#	Episode 6 (Online votes)	Episode 7 (Live votes)		Episode 7 (Total votes Ep6-7)	Episode 8 (Live votes)		Episode 9 (Total votes)	
#	Episode 6 (Online votes)	Name	Votes	Episode 7 (Total votes Ep6-7)	Name	Votes	Name	Votes
1	Masaya Kimura	Syunji Koike	110,159	Shogo Tajima	Shogo Tajima	100,018	Shogo Tajima	738,955
2	Shogo Tajima	Kouki Sakamoto	110,147	Masaya Kimura	Syunji Koike	20,0XX	Masaya Kimura	711,278
3	Renta Nishijima	Kaiho Nakano	110,132	Kyosuke Fujimaki	Renta Nishijima	20,0XX	Kyosuke Fujimaki	524,051
4	Hiroto Nishi	Takumi Ozaki	20,142	Syunji Koike	Hiroto Nishi	20,0XX	Renta Nishijima	457,123
5	Kyosuke Fujimaki	Wataru Takahashi	10,146	Hiroto Nishi	Rihito Ikezaki	20,0XX	Hiroto Nishi	456,053
6	Daigo Kobayashi	Jin Matsuda	10,135	Renta Nishijima	Kaiho Nakano	20,0XX	Syunji Koike	377,619
7	Takumi Ozaki	Kyosuke Fujimaki	10,134	Daigo Kobayashi	Hideaki Sasaoka	20,0XX	Daigo Kobayashi	357,404
8	Yudai Sano	Shogo Tajima	10,115	Takumi Ozaki	Masato Ueda	20,0XX	Takumi Ozaki	350,768
9	Hiroma Takatsuka	Hiromu Takatsuka	10,111	Kaiho Nakano			Yudai Sano	350,580
10	Syunji Koike	Masaya Kimura	144	Kouki Sakamoto			Shunsei Ota	345,747
11	Koshin Terao	Xu Fengfan	137	Shunsei Ota			Takeru Goto	338,013

Notes

- On Episode 7, an additional 10,000 votes were given to the winner of each group and an additional 100,000 votes to the winner of each position category. These benefits were doubled for the winners of the HIDDEN category. Position winners also received an interview on regular TV, as well as in Anan and Oricon.
- On Episode 8, the winning group received a total of 240,000 additional votes: 20,000 votes for every member besides the one who placed first, who instead received 100,000 votes.
- The ranking for Episode 9 is the result of combining online votes and live votes from the previous episode.

=== Result ===
#	Episode 10 (Total votes)			
#	Name	Votes	Prefecture/Country	Audition Name
1	Masaya Kimura	380,796	Aichi	DU Quintet
2	Hiromu Takatsuka	316,127	Tokyo	Big Dream
3	Shogo Tajima	281,323	Tokyo	K-Phoenix
4	Kyosuke Fujimaki	276,066	Nagano	Mogitate Alps
5	Takumi Ozaki	264,254	Osaka	Prince of Naniwa
6	Hiroto Nishi	259,628	Kagoshima	Ikinari Smile
7	Jin Matsuda	252,479	Okinawa	SUPER MENSORE
8	Xu Fengfan	249,237	China	Team-A
9	Rihito Ikezaki	249,021	Fukuoka	T-RAP
10	Yudai Sano	243,006	Osaka	Prince of Naniwa
11	Takeru Goto	239,150	Osaka	Prince of Naniwa

== Discography ==
=== Extended plays ===
Title	Details	Peak chart positions		Sales
Title	Details	JPN Hot	JPN Dig	Sales
40 Boys 5 Concepts	Released: May 28, 2021; Label: Lapone Entertainment; Formats: Digital download	71	2	JPN: 2,885

== Broadcasting time & Reception ==
=== Broadcasting time ===
Network	Title	Broadcasting Dates	Broadcasting Time
GyaO!	Special Episode	March 10, 2021	Thursday 9-10 pm
GyaO!	Episode 0	April 1, 2021	Thursday 9-10 pm
GyaO!	Regular Episode	April 8 – June 3, 2021	Every Thursday 9PM
YouTube	Special Episode with English sub	March 11, 2021	Friday 9-10 pm
YouTube	Episode 0 with English sub	April 2, 2021	Friday 9-10 pm
YouTube	Regular Episode with English sub	April 9 – June 4, 2021	Every Friday 9PM
TBS	Highlight	April 15 – June 10, 2021	Every Thursday 1:58 - 2:28 am
TBS	Live Final	Jun 13, 2021	Sunday 2:00 - 3:54 pm

=== Ratings on TBS ===
Title	Original broadcast date	Timeslot (JST)	Ratings	
Title	Original broadcast date	Timeslot (JST)	Average households audience share (Kanto)	Average individual audience share (Kanto)
Live Final	June 13, 2021	2:00 - 3:54 pm	3.8%	2.0%

== Aftermath ==
- INI released their debut Maxi single "A" which featured the promotional singles "Rocketeer" and "Brighter" on November 3, 2021.
- Some trainees formed/joined groups:
  - Ota Shunsei (14th), Kaiho Nakano (19th), Toma Nakamura (20th), Yotsuya Shinsuke (22nd), Kohei Kurita (23rd), Shu Kobori (24th), Wataru Takahashi (30th), and Kose Naoki (17th on Episode 5 but left due to COVID-19 diagnosis) signed with Yoshimoto Kogyo and debuted in boy group Octpath on February 9, 2022. Renta Nishijima (16th) was announced as an additional member on November 19, 2023. Toma left the group on August 7, 2023 for the reason of his adjustment disorder.
  - Daisuke Morisaki (68th) signed with Keystone Entertainment and debuted in boy group BLANK2Y under stage name Mikey on May 24, 2022.
  - Daigo Kobayashi (13th) and Renta Nishijima (16th) signed with Wake One Entertainment and were added to boy group TO1 as new members on June 17, 2022. On September 22, 2023, Renta announced that he had withdrew from the group and label.
  - Fuma Murata (withdrew before program aired) participated in "&AUDITION - The Howling" and debuted in boygroup &TEAM under Hybe Labels Japan on December 7, 2022.
  - Shoya Fukuda (32d), Vasayegh Hikaru (33rd), Masato Ueda (38th), Yusei Tekoe (39th), Rick Yasue (47th), Ryusuke Kodama (53rd) and Reiji Fukushima (57th) debuted in KEN THE 390-produced boy group Maison B on February 15, 2023, after pre-debuting on August 19, 2022. The group disbanded on May 20, 2025.
  - Okubo Naru (12th), Terao Koshin (17th), Hiramoto Ken (34th), Fukuda Ayuta (35th) debuted on May 10, 2023, as 6-member boygroup DXTEEN under Lapone Entertainment.
  - Anthonny Iinuma (18th) debuted in 4 member boy group TOZ with their debut EP "Flare" on the 27th September 2023.
  - Neo Yoshii (85th) joined WARPs DIG new boy group ONE OR EIGHT under Avex Management as additional member on May 7th 2024.
- Some trainees signed with labels:
  - Neo Yoshii (85th) announced that he signed with Avex Management on November 7, 2021.
  - Okubo Naru (12th), Terao Koshin (17th), Hiramoto Ken (34th), Fukuda Ayuta (35th) signed with Lapone Entertainment as trainees and were revealed in December 2021.
  - Syunji Koike (15th) and Hiroaki Morii (29th) appeared on YouTube channel 'Peche' on March 21, 2022, and are actively promoting while in Korea as trainees.
  - Anthonny Iinuma (18th) signed with YY Entertainment.
- Some trainees became independent artists:
  - Hideaki Sasaoka (25th) released 'purple' as a digital EP in April 2022.
- Some trainees joined other survival shows:
  - Kouki Sakamoto (21st) and Mizuki Shinohara (28th) joined Sony Music's TORA Project in November 2021 and appeared on 'Boku Debut?' (a joint project with Sony and Yoshimoto Kogyo) airing on BS Yoshimoto in July 2022.
  - Fuma Murata (withdrew before program aired) participated in "&AUDITION - The Howling" in 2022.
  - Anthonny Iinuma (18th) and Yuki Miura (67th) participated in Boys Planet.
  - Shoya Fukuda (32nd), Hikaru Vasayegh (33rd) and Ryusuke Kodama (53rd; as Lyu) participated in Chuang Asia: Season 2
  - Ayumu Shinogaya (43rd) participated in Produce 101 Japan Shinsekai. He was eliminated in episode 10 with the final rank being 33rd.
