= INI (Japanese boy group) =

Japanese boy group

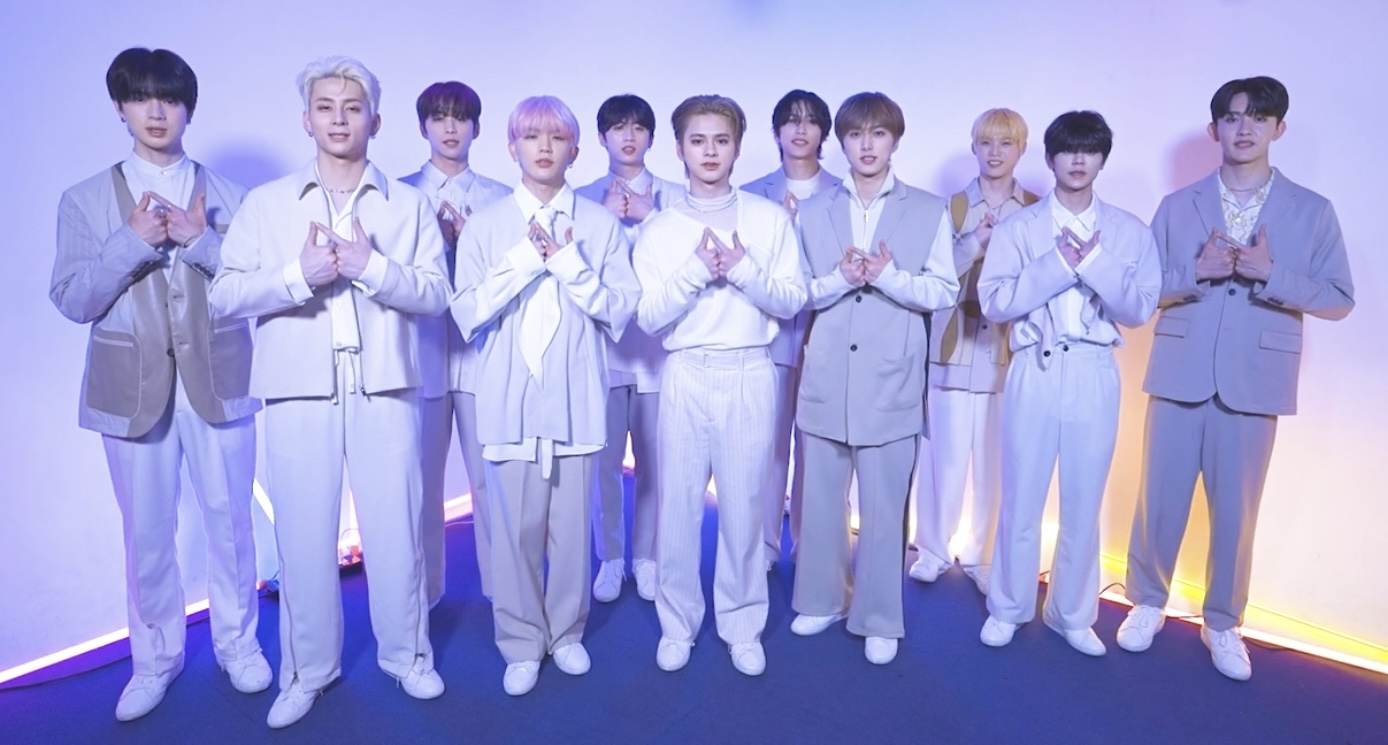
- INI in March 2023

Background information
- Origin: Japan
- Genres: J-pop; K-pop
- Years active: 2021–present
- Label: Lapone Entertainment
- Members: Masaya Kimura; Hiromu Takatsuka; Shogo Tajima; Kyosuke Fujimaki; Takumi Ozaki; Hiroto Nishi; Jin Matsuda; Fengfan Xu; Rihito Ikezaki; Yudai Sano; Takeru Goto
- Website: ini-official.com

INI (アイエヌアイ, Aienuai) is a Japanese boy band formed through the reality competition show Produce 101 Japan 2. The group is composed of eleven members: Masaya Kimura, Hiromu Takatsuka, Shogo Tajima, Kyosuke Fujimaki, Takumi Ozaki, Hiroto Nishi, Jin Matsuda, Fengfan Xu, Rihito Ikezaki, Yudai Sano and Takeru Goto. Like the winners of the first season of Produce 101 Japan, INI is intended to be a permanent group. The group is managed by Lapone Entertainment, a joint company between Yoshimoto Kogyo and CJ ENM.

They made their debut on November 3, 2021, with the single A.

== Name ==
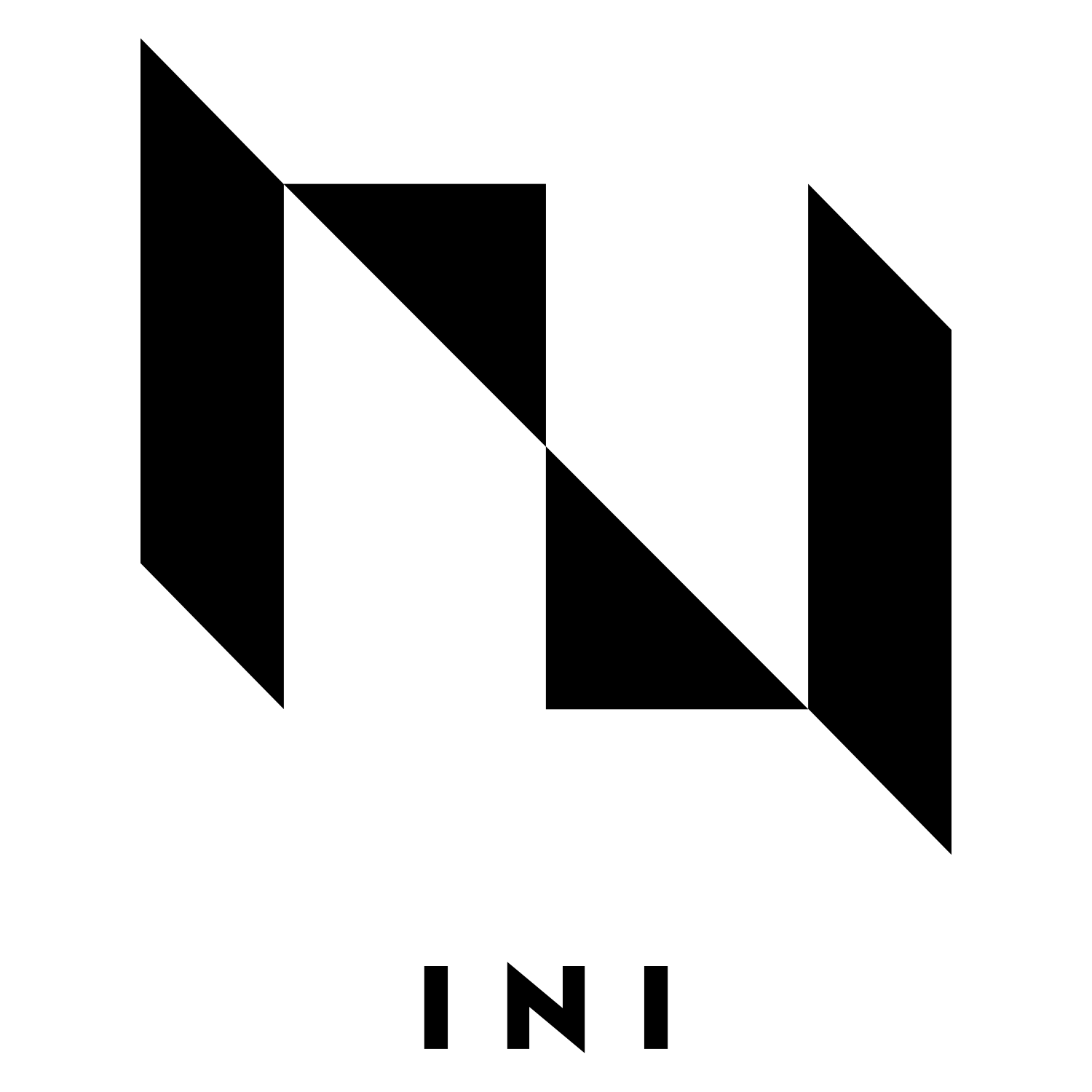
INI official logo.

The group's name, INI, was chosen by Lapone Entertainment among all the suggestions given by the viewers through Produce 101 Japan's official website. The name was announced during the final episode of the show.

The official meaning of the name is "the 11 of us (me/I) who met on Produce 101 Japan Season 2 connect (Network) with you (I)".

== Career ==
=== Pre-debut: Formation through Produce 101 Japan Season 2 ===
In November 2020, applications for the second season of Produce 101 Japan, the Japanese spin-off of the South Korean Produce 101 franchise, opened. The series began airing in April 2021, with the finale broadcast live on TBS on June 13, where the final 11 members of the group were decided. Unlike other groups made from the Produce 101 series, INI, like their predecessors JO1, are a permanent group.

Prior to their debut, each of the 11 members had varying degrees of experience in the entertainment industry. Kimura and Nishi worked as back-up dancers while Tajima had been a trainee at Cube Entertainment for 2 years prior to his appearance in the show. Ozaki was previously under Avex Management, Fujimaki was active on TikTok and had amassed over 190,000 followers, and Xu was previously a trainee in China.

=== 2021: Debut with A ===
On September 4, Masaya was selected as the group's leader, and on the 8th, the group's fan club name was announced as "Mini".

Following the end of Produce 101 Japan Season 2, the group flew to South Korea to start preparing for their debut. On September 18, plans for their debut single A were announced, with its release scheduled for November. Teasers for the songs "Rocketeer" and "Brighter" were released and it was announced that the title track would be decided by fan voting. On September 25, it was announced that "Rocketeer" was voted as the single's title track, and on the 26th the music videos for both singles were released.

On October 18, the group's first TV show INI Station began streaming on GyaO!. The show followed the group's 3-month long training programme in South Korea and the recording of their debut single.

On November 3, the group's debut single A was released. It debuted at No. 1 on the Oricon Singles Chart and sold over 500,000 copies in its first week, making it the fifth highest first-week sales record for a debut single of all time. On the 13th and 14th, the group held their first fan meeting at Pia Arena MM in Yokohama with an audience of 24,000 fans.

=== 2022: I, first arena tour, and studio album Awakening ===
On January 7, the group's first radio show From INI was aired on Tokyo FM and JFN stations. On the 15th, their TV programme INI Road ~Road to Global Expansion~ started airing on Music On! TV and finished after 4 episodes. On February 28, the group filmed the continuation of the programme titled INI Road ~Road to Global Expansion~ #2.

On March 13, teasers for "Call 119" and "We Are" were released. As for first single, the title track for their second single I was voted by fans, and on the 20th, "Call 119" was selected. The music video was also released on the same day. On April 1, the second season of the group's first TV show INI STATION was aired on GyaO!. On the 20th their second single I was released and 500,000 copies were sold within two days, making them the first group in Oricon history to have two consecutive singles sell over 500,000 copies in their first week. On May 18, the group released the song "Yummy!!" for a collaboration with S&B Mazerudake no Spaghetti Sauce.

On July 1, the group broadcast "INI First Anniversary Live" on their official YouTube channel where they announced that they plan to release their third single M and hold the group's first arena tour in four cities across Japan. On August 10, the group held their first exhibition "INI museum" where all members were involved in creating exhibits. It was held at 7 hmv museum venues nationwide. M was released on the 30th and became their third consecutive single to place first on the Oricon SIngles Chart.

On 3 September, INI performed at the WANIMA presents 1CHANCE FESTIVAL 2022 organised by the rock band Wanima at Kumamoto Prefecture's country park. There they performed the song "Hero", which was written by Wanima. It was used as the theme song of the KTV drama "Convenience Store Heroes ~Anata no SOS, Itadakishita!!~" starring member Ozaki, and the song was released for distribution on October 17. On the 18th, Kimura, Tajima, Takatsuka, Fujimaki and Matsuda appeared in the TBS drama I Will Be Your Bloom where they played the role of CHAYNEY, the rival of idol group 8LOOM. On the 23rd, their TV show "INI no Oshigoto desu!" began airing on Nippon TV and Hulu.

On December 14, their first album Awakening was released, which included the title tracks of the singles A, I and M. Nishi and Tajima contributed to writing the lyrics of the title tracks "Spectra" and "Runaway".The album sold 241,000 copies in its first week and reached No. 1 on the Oricon Albums Chart. On the 17th the group started their tour 2022 INI 1st Arena Live Tour [Break The Code] at the at Aichi Sky Expo Hall A in Aichi Prefecture. The group toured five venues in four cities across Japan: Tokyo, Tokoname, Osaka and Fukuoka. A total of 13 shows were held and 120,000 people attended, with an additional show added in Nippon Budokan on January 7 and 8, 2023. Documentary videos of the live tour were sequentially released the group's official YouTube channel from March 15.

=== 2023: Drop That, Tag Me, and second arena tour ===
On January 19, the group appeared in a commercial for the retail company Aoyama Tailor, with their song "New Day" used as the accompanying music. The song was available from January 30 and a performance video was released on February 6 on the official YouTube channel.

On May 2, Takatsuka was chosen to star in the Japanese dub version of the 2018 Ukrainian animated film The Stolen Princess. On July 17, INI's song "My Story" was written for the film with Takatsuka contributing to the lyrics. The film was released on September 22. On May 24, their fourth single Drop That was released. It topped both the Oricon and Billboard Japan charts and exceeded 300,000 sales in its first week on Oricon, with Billboard Japan recording 520,000 first-week sales. The single's lead track is "Fanfare", with Fujimaki writing the lyrics for "Let's Escape" and Nishi contributing to the song "Drop".

On June 8, they made their first appearance on Mnet's M Countdown in South Korea, performing the Korean version of "Fanfare", marking their Korean debut. In July, their song "Moment" was used as the theme song for Virtual Adventure King 2023, a virtual event organised by Fuji TV and NTT QONOQ. The song was choreographed by Kimura and was performed for the first time at Mezamashi Live on August 7. It was released for distribution on August 14 and on October 20 it was used in a commercial for Aoyama Tailor's 60th anniversary starring INI. On August 30 their first photo book Chrono was released. It ranked first on Oricon's Weekly Book Ranking.

On September 12, the group sang the OST "Busterz" for Mnet's dance survival show Street Woman Fighter 2. On October 11, their fifth single "Tag Me" was released. It debuted at No. 1 on the Oricon Singles Charts selling 306,000 copies in its first week. They then made their first appearance on SBS' Inkigayo on the 22nd, where they performed the Korean version of "Hana".

On November 4, they embarked on their second arena tour 2023 INI 2nd Arena Live Tour [Ready To Pop!], which started at Ariake Arena, Tokyo, and consisted of 15 shows in seven cities across Japan. On December 21, the final show of the tour was held at Osaka-jo Hall. The tour attracted 130,000 people. On November 27, it was announced that their second studio album Match Up would be released on February 14, 2024.

On December 9 and 15, the group's special programme 1st Live INI was broadcast on TV Asahi, in which the group attempted their first self-produced live show. The programme was also streamed on Telasa, and a video following the process behind the making of the live performance was also available after the show ended.

=== 2024: Second album Match Up, The Frame, first fan-con, and The View ===
On February 7, the title track "Legit" was made available for download prior to the release of their second album, with Nishi contributing to the lyrics. On the 12th, the music video was released and their second album Match Up was released on the 14th. The album debuted at the No. 1 on the album charts of both Oricon and Billboard Japan. First-week sales exceeded the previous album on both charts, with Billboard Japan reporting over 300,000 copies sold. On the 24th and 25th, they held their first solo dome concert, INI 2ND ARENA LIVE TOUR [READY TO POP!] IN KYOCERA DOME OSAKA at Kyocera Dome Osaka, attracting 35,000 people for one concert and 70,000 people over two days. This recorded a total of 200,000 attendees for the entire tour.

On March 15, it was announced that their song "Whatever Happens" would be used as the opening theme for the anime Touken Ranbu Kaze -Kyoden Kennuru Honnouji-. The song was released for distribution on 3 April, the day after the first broadcast of the anime. On April 23, it was announced that the group's sixth single The Frame will be released on June 26 with the title track "Loud". "Loud" was available for pre-release streaming on June 17 and The Frame was released digitally on June 24. The single debuted at number 1 on the Oricon Singles Chart, selling 673,000 copies in its first week, surpassing the previous first-week sales record of 581,000 copies set by their second single I. It also became their first single to be certified as a million-seller by the RIAJ in their July 2024 certification list.

On July 4, the group announced that they will release the track "Break of Dawn" which will act as the theme song for the movie Atashi no! starring Kimura. The movie will be released on November 8. Simultaneously, dates for their Fan-Con tour [Flip The Circle] were announced, with 20 performances planned spanning over 11 cities. The tour will commence with a performance in Kanagawa on September 21, and end in Osaka on November 4.

On August 28, INI was appointed as the beauty ambassador for the new beauty grooming brand Schick FIRST TOKYO, with the group releasing the digital single "First" on September 2 to commemorate the collaboration. On the 30th, INI announced that their seventh single The View will be released on October 30. On October 23, it was announced that the group's new TV programme INItime Music will begin airing on Nippon Television from November 11.

On December 20, it was announced that the single "Make It Count" would be available for digital distribution from January 13, 2025. The single serves as opening theme song for the anime You're Going to Fall in Love Anyway, which was aired on January 9.

=== 2025: Third arena tour, The Origin, first documentary film, and The Winter Magic ===
On February 14, the group announced their third arena live tour titled XQUARE. The tour had 15 shows and commenced on May 6 in Fukuoka. Three additional shows were added on May 25 for Aichi from September 13 to 15 under the title of XQUARE - MASTERPIECE. The tour had an attendance of 260,000 and featured a total of 35 songs. On the 18th, INI was selected as the official ambassador for the 2026 Asian Games and the Asian Para Games, which were held in Aichi and Nagoya in 2026. The official commissioning ceremony was held on the 26th with Kimura in attendance.

On March 4 and 5, INItime Music Live, a live event linked to the group's program INItime Music, was held at K-Arena Yokohama. On the 29th, it was announced that the group will release the single "Party Goes On" on April 3. The song served as the theme song of TBS's King's Brunch which aired on April 5. The group's third album The Origin was released on June 25, with three versions, "Ascending", "Landing", and "Winning" available for sale. The title single "Dominance" was released on the same day, with the digital single "Potion" released ahead of the album on May 1. The third track "Pineapple Juice" was subsequently used as the promotional song during a collaboration with Dole plc.

On June 14, the group held a livestream titled INI Contact on their official YouTube channel to celebrate their fourth anniversary, where they announced that their first documentary film, INI the Movie: I Need I, would be released on October 31. The theme song, "Because You Were There (君がいたから)" was written by Ikezaki, Ozaki, Goto, Sano, Takatsuka, and Fujimaki. It was announced in early October that the group will release a winter single titled The Winter Magic on November 19 with 5 songs including "Present" and "True Love". "True Love" will serve as the theme song for the movie Romantic Killer starring Kimura, which is scheduled for release on December 12. The single recorded the highest first-week domestic sales of 2025, exceeding 1.2 million copies. It became the group’s first million-selling release and earned them Billboard Japan’s 2025 Top Singles Sales Award.

=== 2026–present: Pulse, Anthem, and fifth anniversary tour ===
On December 12, 2025, the group announced the expected release of their second photo book titled Viva la vita to celebrate their fifth anniversary. It will be 192 pages long and shot entirely in Milan. It will be released on February 24, 2026. On January 28 the group announced that their eighth single Pulse will be released on April 22.

On March 20, it was revealed that the group's song "Rendezvous" will be used as the theme song for Fuji TV's new Sunday information program Sunday Brake, which will start airing from the 29th. The group's ninth single Anthem is scheduled for release on September 16.

The group released their first fully English song "Sand Castle" on June 10 in collaboration with Emporio Armani for the brand's 2026 Spring/Summer Men's Collection Origins. The digital cover of the single was created by Ikezaki. On June 13, the group's fifth anniversary dome tour, City of Lights, was announced. The tour commenced on September 16 in Tokyo Dome and will finish in Osaka's Kyocera Dome on November 15, featuring 4 shows in total.

== Artistry ==
=== Music style ===
During an interview in 2022 with the magazine Nikkei Entertainment!, Lapone Entertainment's CEO Choi Shin-hwa answered questions regarding the group's musical identity. He acknowledged online criticism regarding the similarities between the group's music and K-pop, and stated that the genre is the basis of the group's music due to the presence of Korean producers and the nature of both the group and company's formation. In another interview with Quick Japan, he stated that the group is based in Japan, and emphasised that their goal is to create a new genre that combines both J-pop and K-pop (which he coined as JK-pop). While hip-hop forms the foundation of the group's music, their sound has diversified since their debut, with their discography incorporating a variety of genres such as city pop, urban pop, G-funk, and Bossa nova. The members have defined their music as INI-pop, a unique term that combines both J-pop and K-pop with a diverse range of genres.

In a 2021 article for the paper Real Sound, writer Azusa Takahashi noted that since the 2000s it has become increasingly common for artists to be involved in various aspects of their music production. She mentioned that when it comes to boy-groups, where abilities in dance, vocals, variety-show knack, and creative skills are increasingly in demand, INI is one group with particular strengths in creativity. Since their debut, the members of the group have taken part in producing their own music. In 2025, with the release of the group's third album The Origin, members Nishi, Tajima, Fujimaki, Ikezaki, Takatsuka, Xu, and Matsuda were credited for contributing to the lyrics for some of the tracks. During an interview for the magazine Actimage, Matsuda explained how the members came to participate in songwriting. He mentioned that while many of INI’s songs are produced by overseas production teams, the group is based in Japan, leading to the belief that it would be better if the members took part in writing the lyrics. This idea was supported by a Japanese production team, who encouraged the members by saying, "If anyone would like to try writing lyrics, please do give it a try."

== Members ==
- Masaya Kimura (木村 柾哉) – leader
- Hiromu Takatsuka (髙塚 大夢)
- Shogo Tajima (田島 将吾)
- Kyosuke Fujimaki (藤牧 京介)
- Takumi Ozaki (尾崎 匠海)
- Hiroto Nishi (西 洸人)
- Jin Matsuda (松田 迅)
- Fengfan Xu (許 豊凡)
- Rihito Ikezaki (池﨑 理人)
- Yudai Sano (佐野 雄大)
- Takeru Goto (後藤 威尊)

== Discography ==
=== Studio albums ===
List of studio albums, with selected details, chart positions and sales
Title	Year	Peak chart positions		Sales	Certifications
Title	Year	JPN	JPN Hot	Sales	Certifications
Awakening	Released: December 14, 2022; Label: Lapone Entertainment; Formats: CD, digital download	1	1	JPN: 266,814 (phy.)	RIAJ: Platinum (phy.)
Match Up	Released: February 14, 2024; Label: Lapone Entertainment; Formats: CD, digital download	1	1	JPN: 269,020 (phy.)	RIAJ: Platinum (phy.)
The Origin	Released: June 25, 2025; Label: Lapone Entertainment; Formats: CD, digital download	1	1	JPN: 410,293 (phy.)	RIAJ: 2× Platinum (phy.)

=== Singles ===
List of singles as lead artist, with selected chart positions and certifications, showing year released and album name
Title	Year	Peak chart positions	Sales	Certifications	Album
Title	Year	JPN	Sales	Certifications	Album
A	2021	1	JPN: 567,944 (phy.)	RIAJ: 2× Platinum (phy.)	Awakening
I	2022	1	JPN: 642,424 (phy.)	RIAJ: 3× Platinum (phy.)	Awakening
M	2022	1	JPN: 521,443 (phy.)	RIAJ: 3× Platinum (phy.)	Awakening
Drop That	2023	1	JPN: 374,050 (phy.)	RIAJ: 2× Platinum (phy.)	Match Up
Tag Me	2023	1	JPN: 343,518 (phy.)	RIAJ: 2× Platinum (phy.)	Match Up
The Frame	2024	1	JPN: 709,515 (phy.)	RIAJ: Million (phy.)	The Origin
The View	2024	1	JPN: 687,950 (phy.)	RIAJ: 3× Platinum (phy.)	The Origin
The Winter Magic	2025	1	JPN: 1,213,001 (phy.)	RIAJ: Million (phy.)	Non-album singles
Pulse	2026	1	JPN: 652,563 (phy.)	RIAJ: Million (phy.)	Non-album singles
Anthem	2026	1	JPN: 604,969 (phy.)	RIAJ: 3× Platinum (phy.)	Non-album singles

=== Promotional singles ===
List of promotional singles, with selected chart positions
Title	Year	Peak chart positions	Sales	Certifications	Album
Title	Year	JPN Hot	Sales	Certifications	Album
"Rocketeer"	2021	2	JPN: 18,304 (dig.)	RIAJ: Platinum (st.)	A
"Call 119"	2022	1	JPN: 5,000 (dig.)	RIAJ: Platinum (st.)	I
"Password"	2022	1	JPN: 1,846 (dig.)	RIAJ: Gold (st.)	M
"Spectra"	2022	16			Awakening
"Fanfare"	2023	2	JPN: 9,343 (dig.)		Drop That
"Hana" (HANA_花)	2023	2	JPN: 5,883 (dig.)		Tag Me
"Legit"	2024	27	JPN: 2,008 (dig.)		Match Up
"Loud"	2024	1	JPN: 37,588 (dig.)		The Frame
"WMDA (Where My Drums At)"	2024	1	JPN: 4,696 (dig.)		The View
"Dominance"	2025	21	JPN: 1,621 (dig.)		The Origin
"Present"	2025	1	JPN: 15,679 (dig.)		The Winter Magic
"All 4 U"	2026	1	JPN: 2,659 (dig.)		Pulse
"You Know What to Do"	2026	1	JPN: 4,718 (dig.)		Anthem

=== Soundtrack appearances ===
Title	Year	Peak chart positions	Sales	Album
Title	Year	JPN Hot	Sales	Album
"Yummy"	2022	76	—N/a	Non-album single
"Hero"	2022	48	—N/a	Convenience Store Heroes ~Anata no SOS, Itadakishita!!~ OST
"New Day"	2023	11	—N/a	Non-album single
"My Story"	2023	19	—N/a	The Stolen Princess Japanese Dub OST
"Moment"	2023	49	—N/a	Non-album single
"Busterz"	2023	— (Note: "Busterz" did not enter the Billboard Japan Hot 100 Chart, but peaked at number 39 on the component Download Chart.)	—N/a	Street Woman Fighter 2 OST Part 3
"Whatever Happens"	2024	62	JPN: 5,774 (dig.)	Touken Ranbu Kaze -Kyoden Kennuru Honnouji- OST
"First"	2024	72	JPN: 5,101 (dig.)	Non-album single
"Break of Dawn"	2024	— (Note: "Break of Dawn" did not enter the Billboard Japan Hot 100 Chart, but peaked at number 6 on the component Download Chart.)	JPN: 4,242 (dig.)	Atashi no! OST
"Make It Count"	2025	59	JPN: 6,289 (dig.)	You're Going to Fall in Love Anyway OST
"Party Goes On"	2025	52	JPN: 9,124 (dig.)	King's Brunch OST
"Because You Were There" (君がいたから)	2025	93		INI the Movie: I Need I OST
"True Love"	2025	—		The Winter Magic and Romantic Killer OST
"Rendezvous"	2026	—	JPN: 1,216 (dig.)	Non-album singles
"Sand Castle"	2026	—	JPN: 1,518 (dig.)	Non-album singles
"—" denotes releases that did not chart or were not released in that region.

=== Other charted songs ===
List of other charted songs with selected chart positions
Title	Year	Peak chart positions	Sales	Album
Title	Year	JPN Hot	Sales	Album
"Brighter"	2021	— (Note: "Brighter" did not enter the Billboard Japan Hot 100 chart, but peaked at number 57 on the component Download Chart.)		A
"We Are"	2022	86		I
"Dramatic"	2022	— (Note: "Dramatic" did not enter the Billboard Japan Hot 100 chart, but peaked at number 74 on the component Download Chart.)		Awakening
"Walkie Talkie"	2024	— (Note: "Walkie Talkie" did not enter the Billboard Japan Hot 100 chart, but peaked at number 71 on the component Download Chart.)		The Frame
"I'm a Dreamer"	2024	— (Note: "I'm a Dreamer" did not enter the Billboard Japan Hot 100 chart, but peaked at number 87 on the component Download Chart.)		The Frame
"3D"	2024	— (Note: "3D" did not enter the Billboard Japan Hot 100 chart, but peaked at number 88 on the component Download Chart.)		The Frame
"I'm a Dreamer (From The First Take)"	2024	— (Note: "I'm a Dreamer (From The First Take)" did not enter the Billboard Japan Hot 100 chart, but peaked at number 63 on the component Download Chart.)		Non-album singles
"Fanfare (From The First Take)"	2024	— (Note: "Fanfare (From The First Take)" did not enter the Billboard Japan Hot 100 chart, but peaked at number 76 on the component Download Chart.)		Non-album singles
"Potion"	2025	— (Note: "Potion" did not enter the Billboard Japan Hot 100 chart, but peaked at number 20 on the component Download Chart.)	JPN: 2,398 (dig.)	The Origin
"—" denotes releases that did not chart or were not released in that region.

== Filmography ==
=== Films ===
Year	Title	Role	Notes	Ref.
2025	INI the Movie: I Need I	Themselves	Documentary film	
2026	2025 INI Live [XQUARE - Masterpiece] – Live Film	Themselves	Footage from their 3rd Arena Live Tour	

=== Television shows ===
Year	Title	Role	Notes	Ref.
2021	Produce 101 Japan season 2	Contestants	Show that decided the members of INI	
2021	INI Station	Hosts		
2022	INI Road ~Road to Global Expansion~	Hosts		
2022	INI no Oshigoto desu!	Hosts	Variety show	
2024	INItime Music	Hosts		

=== Radio shows ===
Year	Title	Notes	Ref.
2022	From INI		

== Bibliography ==
=== Photobooks ===
Title	Release date	Peak chart positions	Publisher	Sales
Title	Release date	JPN	Publisher	Sales
Chrono	August 2023	1	Yoshimoto Books	JPN: 38,904
Viva la vita	February 2026	1	Kodansha	JPN: 66,249

== Concerts and tours ==
=== Tours ===
INI 1st Arena Live Tour [Break The Code] (2022–2023)

Date	City	Venue
December 17 & 18, 2022	Aichi	Aichi Sky Expo
December 20 & 21, 2022	Osaka	Osaka-jō Hall
December 24 & 25, 2022	Tokyo	Ariake Arena
December 27 & 28, 2022	Fukuoka	Marine Messe Fukuoka Hall A
January 7 & 8, 2023	Tokyo	Nippon Budokan

INI 2nd Arena Live Tour [Ready To Pop!] (2023, 2024)

Date	City	Venue
November 4 & 5, 2023	Tokyo	Ariake Arena
November 11 & 12, 2023	Rifu	Sekisui Heim Super Arena
November 14 & 15, 2023	Nagoya	Nippon Gaishi Hall
November 22 & 23, 2023	Fukuoka	Marine Messe Fukuoka Hall A
November 29 & 30, 2023	Yokohama	Yokohama Arena
December 2 & 3, 2023	Hiroshima	Hiroshima Green Arena
December 20 & 21, 2023	Osaka	Osaka-jō Hall
February 24 & 25, 2024	Osaka	Kyocera Dome Osaka

INI Fan Con Tour [Flip The Circle] (2024)

Date	Area	Venue
September 21–23, 2024	Kanagawa	Pia Arena MM
September 30 – October 1, 2024	Aichi	Nagoya Congress Center, Century Hall
October 4 & 5, 2024	Okayama	Okayama Performing Arts Theatre, Harenowa 'Grand Theatre'
October 7 & 8, 2024	Ehime	Matsuyama City Auditorium, Large Hall
October 9, 2024	Kochi	Kochi Prefectural Culture Hall, Orange Hall
October 11 & 12, 2024	Nagano	Hokuto Cultural Hall
October 15 & 16, 2024	Fukuoka	Kitakyushu Soleil Hall
October 17, 2024	Kumamoto	Kumamoto-Jo Hall, Main Hall
October 21 & 22, 2024	Miyagi	Sendai Sun Plaza Hall
October 23, 2024	Saitama	Sonic City, Large Hall
November 3 & 4, 2024	Osaka	Expo'70 Commemorative Park, Maple River Grassy Area

INI 3rd Arena Live Tour [XQUARE] (2025)

Date	Area	Venue
May 6 & 7, 2025	Fukuoka	Marine Messe Fukuoka Hall A
May 10 & 11, 2025	Aichi	Aichi Sky Expo
May 24 & 25, 2025	Kanagawa	K Arena Yokohama
June 6–8, 2025	Hyogo	World Memorial Hall
June 28 & 29, 2025	Kagawa	Anabuki Arena Kagawa
September 13–15, 2025	Aichi	Vantelin Dome Nagoya

INI 5th Anniversary Dome Tour [City Of Lights] (2026)

Date	City	Venue
September 16 & 17, 2026	Tokyo	Tokyo Dome
November 14 & 15, 2026	Osaka	Kyocera Dome Osaka

== Awards and nominations ==
Name of the award ceremony, year presented, award category, nominee(s) and the result of the award
Award ceremony	Year	Category	Nominee/work	Result	Ref.
Asia Star Entertainer Awards	2024	The Best Performance (Japan)	INI	Won	
Billboard Japan Music Awards	2025	Top Singles Sales of the Year	The Winter Magic	1st place	
Japan Gold Disc Award	2022	Best 5 New Artist	INI	Won	
Japan Gold Disc Award	2025	Best 5 Singles	The Frame	Won	
Japan Record Awards	2021	Best New Artist	INI	Won	
Japan Record Awards	2021	Best New Artist Award	INI	Nominated	
JC JK Buzzword Award	2021	People Category	INI	1st place	
Korea Grand Music Awards	2025	Best Dance Performance	"Dominance"	Nominated	
Korea Grand Music Awards	2025	Best Music Video	"Dominance"	Nominated	
Korea Grand Music Awards	2025	Best Popularity – Artist Day	INI	Nominated	
Korea Grand Music Awards	2025	BIGC Global Star Award	INI	Nominated	
Korea Grand Music Awards	2025	K-Pop Overseas Artist	INI	Won	
Line Music Trend Award	2021	Trend Artist	INI	Won	
MAMA Awards	2021	Favorite Asian Artist	INI	Won	
MAMA Awards	2023	Favorite Asian Male Group	INI	Won	
MAMA Awards	2024	Favorite Asian Artist	INI	Won	
MAMA Awards	2026	Favorite Asian Group	INI	Won	
MTV Video Music Awards Japan	2022	Best New Artist Video – Japan	"Rocketeer"	Won	
MTV Video Music Awards Japan	2025	Best Choreography	"WMDA (Where My Drums At)"	Won	
MTV Video Music Awards Japan	2025	Video of the Year	"WMDA (Where My Drums At)"	Nominated	
MTV Video Music Awards Japan	2026	Best Asia Group	INI	Won	
Music Awards Japan	2025	Best of Listeners' Choice: Japanese Song	"Loud"	Nominated	
Music Awards Japan	2025	Best of Listeners' Choice: Japanese Song	"WMDA (Where My Drums At)"	Nominated	
Music Awards Japan	2025	Special Award: Oshi-Katsu Request Artist of the Year	INI	Nominated	
Nylon's Next	2022	Artist Group Category	INI	Won	
