= Ken the 390 =

Japanese rapper and music director

- Born: Takeshi Sakuma; June 17, 1981 (age 45)
- Origin: Machida, Tokyo, Japan
- Genre: Japanese hip hop
- Occupations: Rapper; songwriter; music director
- Years active: 1999–present
- Labels: Da.Me.Records, Rhythm Zone, Dream Boy
- Website: kenthe390.jp

Ken the 390 (stylized as KEN THE 390; born Takeshi Sakuma on June 17, 1981) is a Japanese rapper, songwriter, and music director from Machida, Tokyo. He began performing in 1999 and built a reputation through club performances and freestyle MC battles before releasing his first solo album, Prologue, in 2006. He later established the independent record label Dream Boy in 2011. Beyond his solo recording career, Ken the 390 has worked in television, anime, artist development, and stage productions.

== Biography ==
Takeshi Sakuma was born in 1981 and raised in Machida, Tokyo. He began his music career in 1999 and became known through frequent club performances and freestyle rap battles. He released his first solo album, Prologue, in 2006. He followed Prologue with My Life and More Life in 2007. In 2008 he released the mini-album Fantastic World through Rhythm Zone. Subsequent albums included New Order (2010) and One (2011).

In 2011, Ken the 390 launched the independent record label Dream Boy. The label was intended both for his own releases and to support younger artists. His releases on and around Dream Boy included Dream Boy: Aru Hareta Hi no Asa ni (2012), #7 (2014), Weekend (2015), Refrain (2018), and Unbirthday (2019). In March 2021 he released en route, his eleventh album, to mark the 15th anniversary of Prologue. His album Last Note, with guest appearances by Aile The Shota, Jay'ed, SKRYU, and Emi Okamoto, was released on February 19, 2025. In 2026, the 20th anniversary year of his CD debut, he released Re:Fined, a project consisting of newly recorded and reconstructed versions of songs originally released during the Dream Boy era.

Ken the 390 was a regular judge on TV Asahi's Freestyle Dungeon, an MC battle program that began in 2015 and ended in June 2020. He later worked as a rap trainer on the audition program Produce 101 Japan Season 2. He returned as the rap trainer for Produce 101 Japan The Girls in 2023. In 2018, KEN THE 390 made his voice-acting debut as Wamu in Masaaki Yuasa's Netflix anime series Devilman Crybaby. He also supervised the rap elements used in the series.

Ken the 390 also served as music director on stage productions in the Hypnosis Mic -Division Rap Battle- Rule the Stage series, including -track.4- and later installments. In 2022, it was announced that he would serve as music director for Attack on Titan: The Musical, based on Hajime Isayama's manga. The production premiered in Osaka and Tokyo in January 2023. He remained music director for the production's New York engagement at New York City Center from October 11 to 13, 2024. In 2026, he served as music director for the stage adaptation of Kei Urana's manga Gachiakuta.

From 2023, Music Natalie published the interview series Japanese MC Battle: Past<Future hosted by Ken the 390, in which Ken the 390 and guest rappers discussed the history and development of Japanese MC battles.

== Discography ==
=== Albums ===
- Prologue (2006)
- My Life (2007)
- More Life (2007)
- New Order (2010)
- One (2011)
- Dream Boy: Aru Hareta Hi no Asa ni (2012)
- #7 (2014)
- Weekend (2015)
- Refrain (2018)
- Unbirthday (2019)
- en route (2021)
- Last Note (2025)
- Re:Fined (2026; re-recorded/reconstructed album)

=== EPs ===
- Fantastic World (2008)
- 2-Kaidate no Ie o Kaō (2013)
- Makkō Shōbu (2016)
- Rock the House (2016)
- Samidare no Kimi ni (2017)
- Think! (2018)
- Faces (2019)
- Unfiltered Red (2023)
- Unfiltered Blue (2023)

== Filmography ==
- Freestyle Dungeon (2015–20) – judge
- Devilman Crybaby (2018) – Wamu; rap supervisor
- Produce 101 Japan Season 2 (2021) – rap trainer
- Produce 101 Japan The Girls (2023) – rap trainer
