= MTV Video Music Awards Japan =

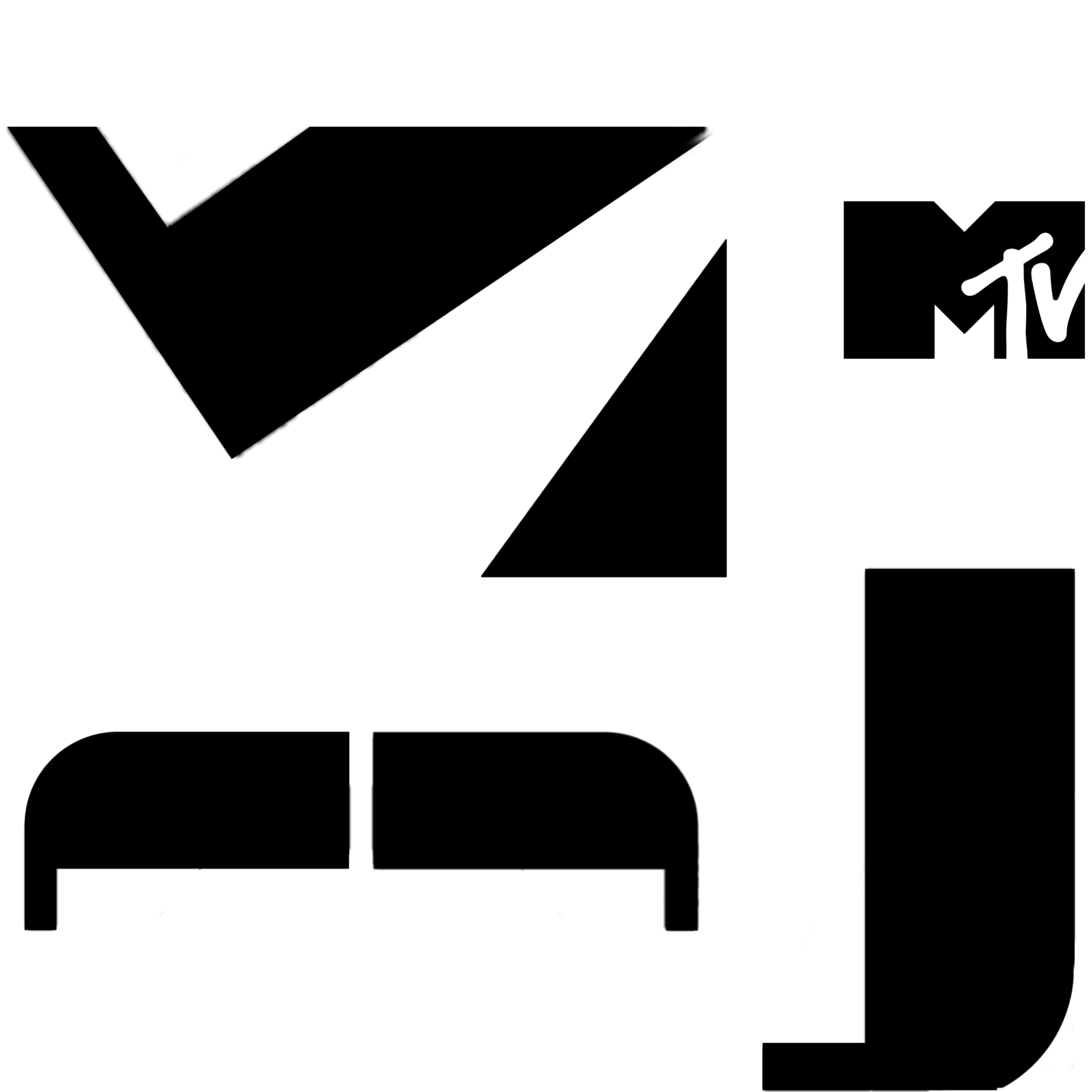
- Awarded for: Music videos and pop culture
- Country: Japan
- Presented by: MTV Japan
- First award: 2002
- Website: Official website

The MTV Video Music Awards Japan (MTV VMAJ for short) are the Japanese version of the MTV Video Music Awards.

Like the MTV Video Music Awards in the United States, in this event artists are awarded for their songs and videos through online voting from the same channel viewers. Initially Japan was part of the MTV Asia Awards, which included all Asian countries, but because of the musical variety existent in Japan, in May 2002 began to hold their own awards independently.

On June 25, 2011, MTV Video Music Japan changed the 2011 ceremony to MTV Video Music Aid Japan 2011 as a charity event for the 2011 Tohoku earthquake and tsunami.

Since 2017 the winners have been announced by the official Instagram account without previous nominations.

== Host cities ==
Edition	Date	Venue	City	Host
1st	May 24, 2002	Tokyo International Forum	Tokyo	London Boots Ichi-gō Ni-gō
2nd	May 25, 2003	Saitama Super Arena	Saitama	Zeebra and Nana Katase
3rd	May 23, 2004	Tokyo Bay NK Hall	Urayasu	Tomomitsu Yamaguchi
4th	May 29, 2005	Tokyo Bay NK Hall	Urayasu	Takashi Fujii and Megumi
5th	May 27, 2006	Yoyogi National Gymnasium	Tokyo	Mokomichi Hayami and Masami Hisamoto
6th	May 26, 2007	Saitama Super Arena	Saitama	Misaki Ito and Hidehiko Ishizuka
7th	May 31, 2008	Saitama Super Arena	Saitama	Cyril
8th	May 30, 2009	Saitama Super Arena	Saitama	Gekidan Hitori
9th	May 29, 2010	Yoyogi National Gymnasium	Tokyo	—N/a
10th	June 25, 2011	Makuhari Messe	Chiba	AKB48
11th	June 23, 2012	Makuhari Messe	Chiba	Perfume
12th	June 22, 2013	Makuhari Messe	Chiba	Nobuaki Kaneko and Atsuko Maeda
13th	June 14, 2014	Maihama Amphitheater	Chiba	Sayumi Michishige
14th	November 26, 2015	act*square	Tokyo	Verbal
15th	October 26, 2016	Shinkiba STUDIO COAST	Tokyo	Rip Slyme
16th	September 27, 2017	Shinkiba STUDIO COAST	Tokyo	Ken Ayuga and JOANN
17th	October 10, 2018	Shinkiba STUDIO COAST	Tokyo	Ken Ayuga and JOANN
18th	September 18, 2019	Shinkiba STUDIO COAST	Tokyo	Hinatazaka46
19th	October 29, 2020		Tokyo	Bish
20th	December 18, 2021		Tokyo	Akari Kitō and Ken Ayugai
21st	November 2, 2022	Musashino Forest Sport Plaza	Tokyo	Iwai Yuki, Mukai Satoshi and Yuka Sagai
22nd	November 22, 2023	K Arena	Yokohama	Ryota Yamasato and Sachi Fujii
23rd	March 19, 2025	K Arena	Yokohama	hiccorohee and Seiya (Shimofuri Myojo)
24th	October 29, 2026	Tokyo Dome	Tokyo	TBA

|}{| class="wikitable mw-collapsible mw-collapsed" style="font-size:small; text-align:center" ! Year !! Artist |- ! 2018 | Daichi Miura |- ! 2019 | One Ok Rock |- ! 2020 | Daiki Tsuneta |- ! 2021 | Yoasobi |- ! 2022 | Vaundy |- ! 2023 | Mrs. Green Apple |}

- Song of the Year (2019–present)

Year	Artist	Song
2019	Official Hige Dandism	"Pretender"
2020	Yoasobi	"Yoru ni Kakeru"
2021	Yuuri	"Dry Flower"
2022	Ado	"New Genesis"
2023	Yoasobi	"Idol"

- Album of the Year (2003–present)
- Group of the Year (2022–present)

Year	Artist
2022	Sakurazaka46
2023	Be First
2024	SixTones

=== Video awards ===
- Best Solo Artist Video (2021–present)

Year	Japan		International	
Year	Artist	Song	Artist	Song
2021	Gen Hoshino	"Fushigi"	Billie Eilish	"Happier Than Ever"
2022	Aimer	"Zankyōsanka"	Harry Styles	"As It Was"
2023	Aiko	"Hateshinai Futari"	Olivia Rodrigo	"Vampire"

- Best Group Video (2002–present)
- Best New Artist Video (2002–present)
- Best Rock Video (2002–present)
- Best Alternative Video (2017–present)

Year	Artist	Song
2017	Rekishi	"Katoku"
2018	Dean Fujioka	"Echo"
2019	Bish	"Stereo Future"
2020	millenium parade	"Fly with me"
2021	Zutomayo	"Kuraku Koruku"
2022	Momoiro Clover Z	"Mysterion"
2023	Mrs. Green Apple	"Magic"

- Best Pop Video (2002–present)
- Best R&B Video (2002–present)
- Best Hip-Hop Video (2002–present)
- Best Dance Video (2010–present)
- Best Collaboration Video (2003–present)
- Best Story Video (2022–present)

Year	Artist	Song
2022	CreepHyp	"Night on the Planet"
2023	Macaroni Enpitsu	"Kanashimi wa Bus ni Notte"

- Best Animation Video (2023–present)

Year	Artist	Song
2023	Yoasobi	"Idol"

- Best Art Direction Video (2018, 2020–present)

Year	Artist	Song
2018	Gen Hoshino	"Idea"
2020	Generations from Exile Tribe	"One in a Million -Kiseki no Yoru ni-"
2021	Hinatazaka46	"Tteka"
2022	King Gnu	"Sakayume"
2023	Aina the End	"Red:Birthmark"

- Best Cinematography (2018, 2020–present)

Year	Artist	Song
2018	Little Glee Monster	"Sekai wa Anata ni Waraikakete Iru"
2020	Bish	"Letters"
2021	Aina the End	"Kinmokusei"
2022	Radwimps	"Ningen Gokko"
2023	Hinatazaka46	"Am I Ready?"

- Best Visual Effects (2021–present)

Year	Artist	Song
2021	Vaundy	"Shiwaawase"
2022	Fujii Kaze	"Damn"
2023	Mrs. Green Apple	"Que Sera Sera"

- Best Choreography (2013–present)

=== Special awards ===
- Inspiration Award Japan (2014, 2016–2017, 2020, 2022)

Year	Artist
2014	Glay
2016	The Yellow Monkey
2017	Buck-Tick
2020	E-girls
2022	Bish

- MTV the World Award (2019, 2021–2022)

Year	Artist	Award
2019	Glay	MTV Rock the World Award
2021	Nogizaka46	MTV Pop the World Award
2022	Takanori Iwata	MTV Dance the World Award

- Best Live Performance (2015, 2022)

Year	Artist
2015	Basement Jaxx
2022	JO1

- MTV Breakthrough Song (2019–2022)

Year	Artist	Song
2019	Foorin	"Paprika"
2020	Eito	"Kōsui"
2021	Ado	"Usseewa"
2022	Da-iCE	"Star Mine"

- Best Buzz Award (2017, 2019–present)

Year	Artist
2017	Keyakizaka46
2019	BTS
2020	Dish
2021	NiziU
2022	Ive
2023	NewJeans
2025	&TEAM

- Rising Star Award (2019–present)

Year	Artist
2019	Ballistik Boyz from Exile Tribe
2019	The Boyz
2020	JO1
2021	Be First
2022	XG
2023	Wolf Howl Harmony

- Daisy Bell Award (2021–present)

Year	Artist	Song
2021	Hiiragi Kirai	"Love ka?"
2022	Balloon	"Pamela"
2023	Marasy, Jin, Shōta Horie (kemu)	"Shinjinrui"

- Global Icon Award (2023–present)

Year	Artist
2023	Cha Eun-woo

- Best Asia Celebrity (2023–present)

Year	Artist
2023	Bright

- Best Asia Group (2023–present)

Year	Artist
2023	The Boyz

- Upcoming Dance & Vocal Group (2023–present)

Year	Artist
2023	DXTEEN
2023	Lil League from Exile Tribe

=== Discontinued award categories ===
- Best Male Video (2002–2019)
- Best Female Video (2002–2019)
- Best Latin Video (2021)

Year	Artist	Song
2021	The Rampage from Exile Tribe	"Heatwave"

- Best Metal Video (2015–2017)

Year	Artist	Song
2015	Babymetal	
2016	Babymetal	"Karate"
2017	Metallica	"Hardwired"

- Best Reggae Video (2010–2014)
- Best Video from a Film (2002–2014)
- Best Karaokee! Song (2009–2014)
- Most Share-worthy Video (2014)

Year	Artist	Song
2014	Kana Nishino	"Believe"

- Best Teen Choice Artist (2016)

Year	Artist
2016	Sakura Fujiwara

- SAS Lifetime Achievement Award Japan (2018)

Year	Artist
2018	SAS

- Special Achievement Award (2014)

Year	Artist
2014	Exile Hiro

== Most wins ==
=== Most wins in a single night ===
Artist	Year	Number of awards	Music video
Mrs. Green Apple	2023	4	"Que Sera Sera" (2); "Magic" (1); Artist of the Year (for Mrs. Green Apple)
Gen Hoshino	2017	3	"Family Song"(2), Koi
Lady Gaga	2011	3	"Born This Way"
Exile	2010	3	"Futatsu no Kuchibiru" (1); Aisubeki Mirai e (1); MTV Icon Award (for Exile)
Exile	2009	3	"Ti Amo (Chapter2)" (2); Best Choreography Award (for Exile)
Exile	2008	3	"I Believe" (1); Exile Love (1); "Toki no Kakera" (1)
Kumi Koda	2007	3	"Yume No Uta" (2); Best Stylish Artist in a Video (1)
Kumi Koda	2006	3	"Butterfly" (2); "Trust You" (1)
Orange Range	2005	3	"Hana" (1); MusiQ (1); "Rocoroshon" (1)
Ayumi Hamasaki	2004	3	"Because of You" (1); "No Way to Say" (1); Best Live Performance (for Ayumi Hamasaki)
Rip Slyme	2003	3	"Rakuen Baby" (2); "Funkastic" (1)

=== Most wins overall ===
Updated till 2020.

Rank	1st	2nd	3rd	4th	5th	6th
Artist	Namie Amuro	Exile	Gen Hoshino	Hikaru Utada; Kumi Koda; Rip Slyme	Daichi Miura Lady Gaga	Ken Hirai Orange Range; One Ok Rock
Total awards	14	11	8	7	6	5
