= Aizo (song) =

Single by King Gnu
- Language: Japanese; English
- Released: January 9, 2026
- Genre: J-pop; alternative rock; anime song
- Length: 3:36
- Label: Ariola Japan
- Songwriter: Daiki Tsuneta
- Composer: Daiki Tsuneta

King Gnu singles chronology
"So Bad" (2025)	"Aizo" (2026)	"Go Ghost" (2026)

Alternative cover
- Limited edition cover

Music video
- "Aizo" on YouTube

"Aizo" (stylized in all caps) is a song by Japanese band King Gnu. It was released digitally on January 9, 2026 through Ariola Japan, with a physical CD released on February 11. The song served as the opening theme for the third season of the Japanese anime series Jujutsu Kaisen, subtitled The Culling Game: Part 1.

== Background and release ==
On December 20, 2025, it was announced that King Gnu would perform the opening theme for the third season of Jujutsu Kaisen, titled "Aizo". This would mark the fourth song the band has provided for the series, following "Ichizu" and "Sakayume" as the opening and ending themes for Jujutsu Kaisen 0 respectively, and "Specialz" as the opening theme for the Shibuya Incident arc of the second season. Upon the single's digital release, King Gnu guitarist and vocalist Daiki Tsuneta commented:

"We are proud to announce that this song is a new update on King Gnu's classic style. As a viewer myself, I’ve been eagerly anticipating The Culling Game arc. Please enjoy this spectacular start to the new year.“

— Daiki Tsuneta

The CD was released in three versions: a standard edition, a limited edition in a 12-inch LP-sized special package featuring cover artwork by Jujutsu Kaisen author Gege Akutami, and a first-pressed limited edition including a Blu-ray disc featuring live footage of King Gnu's 2025 Livehouse Tour, which was exclusive to members of their fan club Club Gnu. The standard and limited editions included live recordings of "Specialz", "Ichizu", and "Sakayume" from the band's The Greatest Unknown Asia Tour in Seoul. All three editions included a serial code valid for additional bonus items.

== Composition and lyrics ==
"Aizo" is an alternative rock song, composed in the key of A minor and is set in time signature of common time with a tempo of 95 BPM. It was composed and written by Daiki Tsuneta. The song's title is taken from the romanization of the kanji characters 愛 ("ai", lit. 'love') and 憎 ("zō", lit. 'hate').

According to Tsuneta and bassist Kazuki Arai, the initial structure of the song was more complex, but was later simplified to ensure further refinements gave the song more of an impact. Tsuneta cited Kenshi Yonezu's "Kick Back" (which he co-produced alongside Yonezu) as an early inspiration for the song, which led to him incorporating a drum and bass pattern. Upon hearing the demo, drummer Yu Seki utilized programmed drums to provoke a drum and bass-style of production. The traditional Japanese instruments shō and shamisen were also integrated. Tsuneta wanted the song to have a Japanese feel to it adjacent to a more contemporary sound, which The Culling Game arc served as an inspiration for.

== Track listing ==
CD – standard and limited edition
No.	Title	Length
1.	"Aizo"	3:36
2.	"Specialz" (King Gnu Asia Tour "The Greatest Unknown" in Seoul)
3.	"Ichizu" (一途; King Gnu Asia Tour "The Greatest Unknown" in Seoul)
4.	"Sakayume" (逆夢; King Gnu Asia Tour "The Greatest Unknown" in Seoul)
Total length:		3:36

First-pressed limited edition Blu-ray: King Gnu Livehouse Tour 2025 Club Gnu Edition
No.	Title	Length
1.	"Asura" ():阿修羅:
2.	"Flash!!!"
3.	"Anataha Shinkirou" (あなたは蜃気楼)
4.	"Nekko" (ねっこ)
5.	"Hitman"
6.	"Prayer X"
7.	"Tokyo Rendez-Vous"
8.	"Specialz"
9.	"Ichizu" (一途)
10.	"Mascara"
11.	"Sunny Side Up"
12.	"Ame Sansan" (雨燦々)

== Credits and personnel ==
Credits adapted from Apple Music.

- Daiki Tsuneta – songwriter, composer, guitar
- Satoru Iguchi – vocals
- Kazuki Arai – bass
- Yu Seki – drums
- King Gnu – performer, arranger
- Ryuma Annaka – mixing engineer

== Charts ==
Weekly chart performance for "Aizo"
Chart (2026)	Peak position
Global 200 (Billboard)	30
Japan (Japan Hot 100)	1
Japan Hot Animation (Billboard Japan)	1
Japan (Oricon)	2
New Zealand Hot Singles (RMNZ)	15
US Hot Rock & Alternative Songs (Billboard)	40

== Certifications and sales ==
Certifications and sales for "Aizo"
Region	Certification	Certified units/sales
Japan (RIAJ) Physical	Gold	100,000^{^}
Streaming
Japan (RIAJ)	Platinum	100,000,000^{†}
^{^} Shipments figures based on certification alone.^{†} Streaming-only figures based on certification alone.
