= MTV Video Music Award Japan for Video of the Year =

Annual Japanese music award

- Country: Japan
- Presented by: MTV Japan
- First award: 2002
- Website: VMAJ website

The MTV Video Music Award Japan for Video of the Year (最優秀ビデオ賞) is an annual award given by MTV Japan since 2002.

== Results ==
The following table displays the nominees and the winners in bold print with a yellow background.

=== 2000s ===
Year	Artist	Video
**2002** (1st)	**Mr. Children**	**"Kimi Ga Suki" (君が好き)** **directed by Tange Kouki**
**2002** (1st)	Aerosmith	"Jaded" directed by Francis Lawrence
**2002** (1st)	Ayumi Hamasaki	"Dearest" directed by Wataru Takeishi
**2002** (1st)	Janet Jackson	"All For You" directed by Dave Meyers
**2002** (1st)	Hikaru Utada	"Traveling" directed by Kazuaki Kiriya
**2003** (2nd)	**Rip Slyme**	**"Rakuen Baby" (楽園ベイベー)**
**2003** (2nd)	Eminem	"Without Me"
**2003** (2nd)	Avril Lavigne	"Complicated"
**2003** (2nd)	Mr. Children	"Hero"
**2003** (2nd)	Hikaru Utada	"Sakura Drops" (Sakuraドロップス)
**2004** (3rd)	**Missy Elliott**	**"Pass That Dutch"** **directed by Dave Meyers**
**2004** (3rd)	Mr. Children	"Kurumi" (くるみ)
**2004** (3rd)	Mika Nakashima	"Seppun" (接吻, Kiss)
**2004** (3rd)	Outkast	"Hey Ya!" directed by Bryan Barber
**2004** (3rd)	Radiohead	"There There" directed by Chris Hopewell
**2005** (4th)	**Orange Range**	**"Hana" (花)** **co-directed by Takahiro Miki and Nobuhiro Doi**
**2005** (4th)	Namie Amuro	"Girl Talk"
**2005** (4th)	Destiny's Child	"Lose My Breath" directed by Marc Klasfeld (under the pseudonym of Alan Smithee)
**2005** (4th)	Eminem	"Just Lose It" directed by Philip G. Atwell
**2005** (4th)	Usher featuring Lil' Jon and Ludacris	"Yeah!" directed by Julien Christian "Director X" Lutz
**2006** (5th)	**Kumi Koda**	**"Butterfly"**
**2006** (5th)	Gorillaz	"Feel Good Inc."
**2006** (5th)	Ketsumeishi	"Sakura" (さくら)
**2006** (5th)	Madonna	"Hung Up"
**2006** (5th)	Oasis	"Lyla"
**2007** (6th)	**Kumi Koda**	**"Yume No Uta" (夢のうた)** **directed by Kawamura Kensuke**
**2007** (6th)	Fergie	"London Bridge" directed by Marc Webb
**2007** (6th)	Mr. Children	"Shirushi" (しるし)
**2007** (6th)	Red Hot Chili Peppers	"Dani California" directed by Tony Kaye
**2007** (6th)	Shōnan no Kaze	"Junrenka" (純恋歌)
**2008** (7th)	**Exile**	**"I Believe"** **directed by Takahide "Taka" Ishii**
**2008** (7th)	Mr. Children	"Irodori" (彩り) directed by Chie Morimoto
**2008** (7th)	Rihanna featuring Jay-Z	"Umbrella" directed by Chris Applebaum
**2008** (7th)	Tokyo Incidents	"O.S.C.A." directed by Yuichi Kodama
**2008** (7th)	Kanye West	"Stronger" directed by Hype Williams
**2009** (8th)	**Exile**	**"Ti Amo (Chapter2)"** **directed by Inoue Tetsuo**
**2009** (8th)	Namie Amuro	"New Look" directed by Shuichi Sato and Yuichi Kodama
**2009** (8th)	Coldplay	"Viva la Vida" directed by Hype Williams
**2009** (8th)	Southern All Stars	"I Am Your Singer" directed by Masuyama Quasi 哉
**2009** (8th)	Britney Spears	"Womanizer" directed by Joseph Kahn

=== 2010s ===
Year	Artist	Video
**2010** (9th)	**Exile**	**"Futatsu no Kuchibiru" (ふたつの唇)** **directed by Shigeaki Kubo**
**2010** (9th)	Namie Amuro	"Fast Car" directed by Shigeaki Kubo
**2010** (9th)	Ayaka	"Minna Sora no Shita" (みんな空の下) directed by Tange Kouki
**2010** (9th)	Alicia Keys	"Doesn't Mean Anything" directed by P. R. Brown
**2010** (9th)	Lady Gaga	"Poker Face" directed by Ray Kay
**2011** (10th)	**Lady Gaga**	**"Born This Way"** **directed by Nick Knight**
**2011** (10th)	Namie Amuro	"Break It" directed by Shigeaki Kubo
**2011** (10th)	Katy Perry featuring Snoop Dogg	"California Gurls" directed by Mathew Cullen
**2011** (10th)	Girls' Generation	"Tell Me Your Wish (Genie)" directed by Jae-Hyeok Jang
**2011** (10th)	Hikaru Utada	"Goodbye Happiness" directed by Hikaru Utada
**2012** (11th)	**Exile**	**"Rising Sun"** **directed by Shigeaki Kubo**
**2012** (11th)	Lady Gaga	"You and I" directed by Laurieann Gibson
**2012** (11th)	Red Hot Chili Peppers	"The Adventures of Rain Dance Maggie" directed by Marc Klasfeld
**2012** (11th)	Girls' Generation	"Mr. Taxi" directed by Hideaki Sunaga
**2012** (11th)	Tokyo Jihen	"Konya wa Karasawagi" (今夜はから騒ぎ) directed by Yuichi Kodama
**2013** (12th)	**Exile Tribe**	**"24karats Tribe of Gold"** **directed by Shigeaki Kubo**
**2013** (12th)	Namie Amuro	"In The Spotlight (Tokyo)" directed by Shigeaki Kubo
**2013** (12th)	Bruno Mars	"Locked Out of Heaven" directed by Cameron Duddy
**2013** (12th)	Mr. Children	"Marshmallow Day" directed by Shinji Kawamura, Kazuaki Seki and Kei Takahashi
**2013** (12th)	Muse	"Follow Me" directed by Tekken
**2014** (13th)	**Exile**	**"Exile Pride ~Konnasekaiwoaisurutame~"**
**2014** (13th)	Katy Perry	"Roar"
**2014** (13th)	Namie Amuro	"Ballerina"
**2014** (13th)	Lady Gaga	"Applause"
**2014** (13th)	Mr. Children	"REM"
**2015** (14th)	**Sandaime J Soul Brothers**	**"Eeny, meeny, miny, moe!"**
**2015** (14th)	Gen Hoshino	"SUN"
**2015** (14th)	Anna Tsuchiya	"Birthday"
**2015** (14th)	Doberman Infinity	"INFINITY"
**2015** (14th)	Pharrell Williams	"Freedom"
**2015** (14th)	Ariana Grande	"Problem featuring Iggy Azalea"
**2015** (14th)	OK Go	"I Won't Let You Down"
**2015** (14th)	Years & Years	"King"
**2015** (14th)	Momoiro Clover Z vs Kiss	"Yume no Ukiyo ni Saite Mina"
**2016** (15th)	**Hikaru Utada**	**"Manatsu no Tōriame"**
**2017** (16th)	**Gen Hoshino**	**"Family Song"**
**2018** (17th)	**Kenshi Yonezu**	**"Lemon"**
**2019** (18th)	**King Gnu**	**"Hakujitsu"** (白日）

=== 2020s ===
Year	Artist	Video
**2020** (19th)	**Aimyon**	**"Naked Heart"** (裸の心)
**2021** (20th)	**Official Hige Dandism**	**"Cry Baby"**
**2022** (21st)	**Sekai no Owari**	**"Habit"**
**2023** (22nd)	**Mrs. Green Apple**	**"Que Sera Sera"**

== See also ==
- MTV Video Music Award for Video of the Year
