= List of Hot 100 number-one singles of 2022 (Japan) =

The following is a list of weekly number-one singles on the Billboard Japan Hot 100 chart in 2022.

== Chart history ==
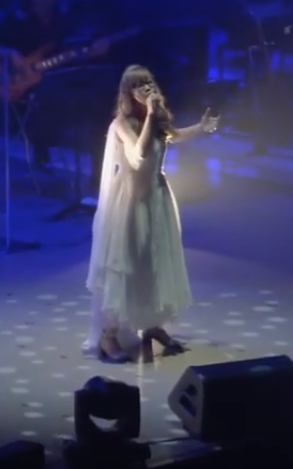
"Zankyōsanka" by Aimer is the longest running number-one song of 2022, with eight weeks atop the chart.

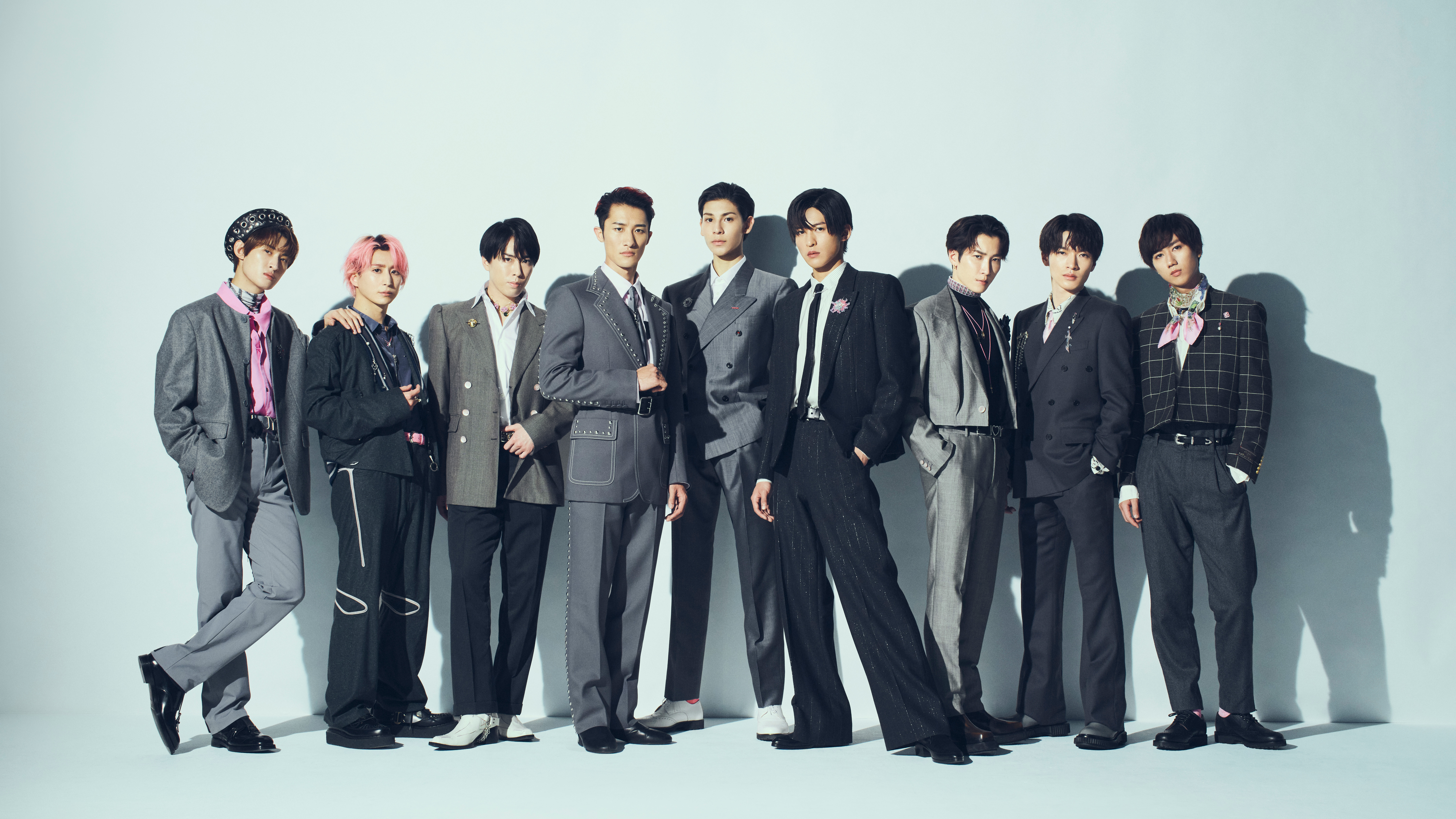
Snow Man scored their 5th and 6th number-one singles with "Brother Beat" and "Orange Kiss".

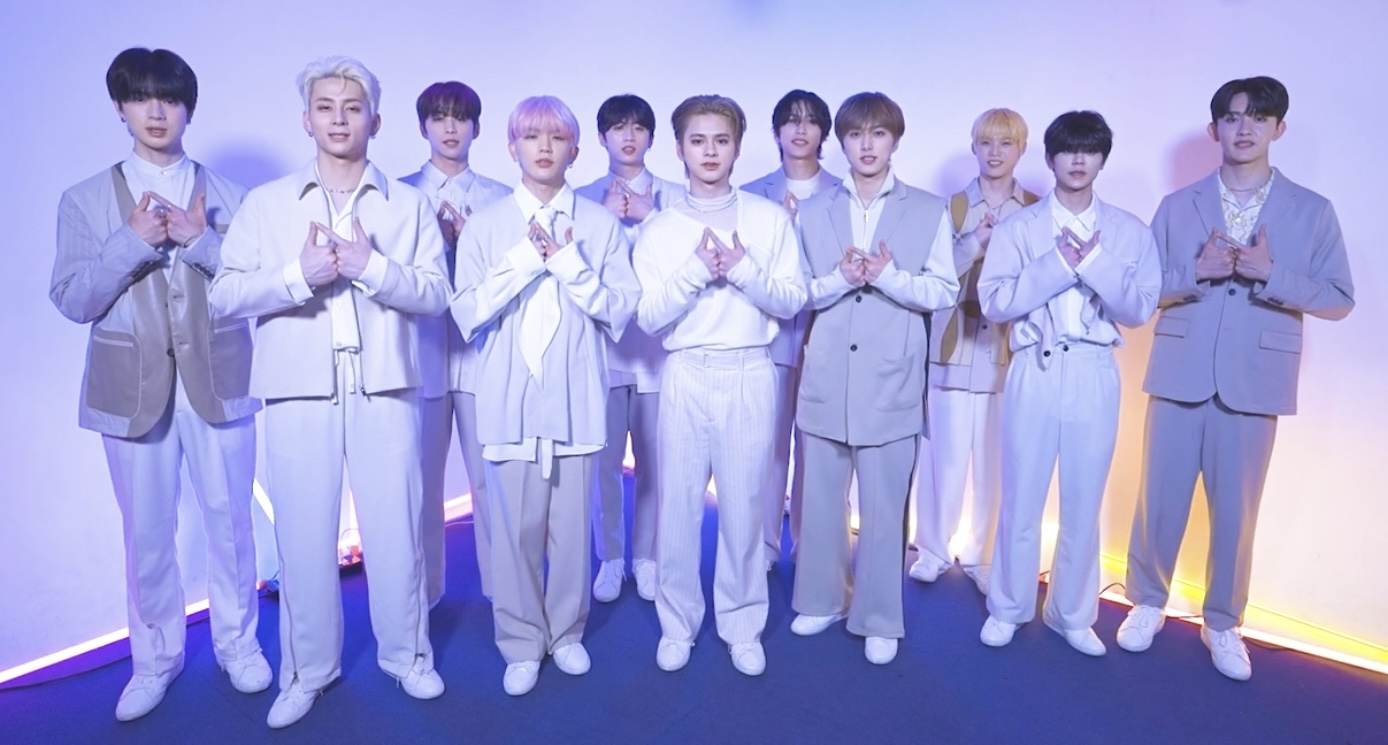
INI achieved their first two number-one songs with "Call 119" and "Password".

Issue date	Song	Artist(s)	Ref.
January 3	"Zankyōsanka"	Aimer	
January 10	"Ichizu"	King Gnu	
January 17	"Ichizu"	King Gnu	
January 24	"Zankyōsanka"	Aimer	
January 31	"Zankyōsanka"	Aimer	
February 7	"Zankyōsanka"	Aimer	
February 14	"Zankyōsanka"	Aimer	
February 21	"Zankyōsanka"	Aimer	
February 28	"Zankyōsanka"	Aimer	
March 7	"Zankyōsanka"	Aimer	
March 14	"Kyōmei"	SixTones	
March 21	"Bye-Good-Bye"	Be First	
March 28	"Chameleon"	King Gnu	
April 4	"Actually..."	Nogizaka46	
April 11	"Brother Beat"	Snow Man	
April 18	"Samidare yo"	Sakurazaka46	
April 25	"Lovin' You"	King & Prince	
May 2	"Call 119"	INI	
May 9	"The Answer"	Naniwa Danshi	
May 16	"Tamed-Dashed"	Enhypen	
May 23	"Mixed Nuts"	Official Hige Dandism	
May 30	"M87"	Kenshi Yonezu	
June 6	"Area"	Hey! Say! JUMP	
June 13	"Boku Nanka"	Hinatazaka46	
June 20	"Watashi"	SixTones	
June 27	"Yet to Come (The Most Beautiful Moment)"	BTS	
July 4	"Habit"	Sekai no Owari	
July 11	"Mixed Nuts"	Official Hige Dandism	
July 18	"Mixed Nuts"	Official Hige Dandism	
July 25	"Orange Kiss"	Snow Man	
August 1	"Clap Clap"	NiziU	
August 8	"Scream"	Be First	
August 15	"Hoshi no Ame"	Johnny's West	
August 22	"New Genesis"	Ado	
August 29	"New Genesis"	Ado	
September 5	"Password"	INI	
September 12	"New Genesis”	Ado	
September 19	"New Genesis”	Ado	
September 26	"TraceTrace"	King & Prince	
October 3	"New Genesis”	Ado	
October 10	"New Genesis”	Ado	
October 17	"Zettai Inspiration"	SKE48	
October 24	"Kick Back"	Kenshi Yonezu	
October 31	"Subtitle"	Official Hige Dandism	
November 7	"Subtitle"	Official Hige Dandism	
November 14	"Subtitle"	Official Hige Dandism	
November 21	"Tsukiyomi"	King & Prince	
November 28	"Subtitle"	Official Hige Dandism	
December 5	"Kick Back"	Kenshi Yonezu	
December 12	"Subtitle"	Official Hige Dandism	
December 19	"Subtitle"	Official Hige Dandism	
December 26	"Subtitle"	Official Hige Dandism	

== See also ==
- List of Billboard Japan Hot Albums number ones of 2022
