= Aizo =

Aizo may refer to:

- Aisso, rebel in Barcelona in 826–827
- Aizo (song), by the Japanese band King Gnu
