= Specialz =

Single by King Gnu

from the album The Greatest Unknown
- Language: Japanese; English
- Released: September 1, 2023
- Genre: Anime song
- Length: 3:54
- Label: Ariola Japan
- Songwriter: Daiki Tsuneta
- Producer: King Gnu

King Gnu singles chronology
"Stardom" (2022)	"Specialz" (2023)

Alternative cover
- Limited edition cover

Music video
- "Specialz" on YouTube

"Specialz" (stylized in all caps) is a song by Japanese band King Gnu from their fourth studio album, The Greatest Unknown. It was released on September 1, 2023, through Ariola Japan. The song served as the opening theme for the sixth episode onwards ("Shibuya Incident" arc) of the second season of the anime series Jujutsu Kaisen, which is the band's second time working with the anime since "Ichizu" and "Sakayume" for the film Jujutsu Kaisen 0.

== In popular culture ==
The song became an Internet meme after a post by NASA of a satellite image of Tokyo which bears a resemblance to a crater formed in the anime. Fans of the anime spammed the post with the caption "You are my special".

== Track listing ==
- Digital download and streaming
1. "Specialz" – 3:58
- CD single (standard and limited editions)
1. "Specialz" – 3:58
2. "Ichizu" (live at Tokyo Dome November 20, 2022) – 3:31
3. "Sakayume" (live at Tokyo Dome November 20, 2022) – 4:55

== Accolades ==
Awards and nominations for "Specialz"
Ceremony	Year	Award	Result	Ref.
Music Awards Japan	2025	Best J-Rock Song	Won	
Music Awards Japan	2025	Best Japanese Song in Europe	Nominated	
Music Awards Japan	2025	Best Japanese Song in North America	Nominated	
Music Awards Japan	2025	Best Japanese Song in Latin America	Nominated	
Music Awards Japan	2025	Best of Listeners' Choice: Japanese Song	Nominated	

== Charts ==
=== Weekly charts ===
Weekly chart performance for "Specialz"
Chart (2023)	Peak position
Global 200 (Billboard)	28
Hong Kong (Billboard)	18
Japan (Japan Hot 100)	2
Japan Hot Animation (Billboard Japan)	1
Japan (Oricon)	4
Japan Combined Singles (Oricon)	4
Japan Anime Singles (Oricon)	1
New Zealand Hot Singles (RMNZ)	21
Taiwan (Billboard)	5
US World Digital Song Sales (Billboard)	4

=== Monthly charts ===
Monthly chart performance for "Specialz"
Chart (2023)	Position
Japan (Oricon)	10
Japan Anime Singles (Oricon)	1

=== Year-end charts ===
2023 year-end chart performance for "Specialz"
Chart (2023)	Position
Japan (Japan Hot 100)	41
Japan Hot Animation (Billboard Japan)	11
Japan Digital Singles (Oricon)	8

2024 year-end chart performance for "Specialz"
Chart (2024)	Position
Japan (Japan Hot 100)	11
Japan Hot Animation (Billboard Japan)	4

== Certifications ==
Certifications for "Specialz"
Region	Certification	Certified units/sales
Japan (RIAJ) Digital	Gold	100,000^{*}
United States (RIAA)	Gold	500,000^{‡}
Streaming
Japan (RIAJ)	3× Platinum	300,000,000^{†}
^{*} Sales figures based on certification alone.^{‡} Sales+streaming figures based on certification alone.^{†} Streaming-only figures based on certification alone.
