= 2022 MTV Video Music Awards Japan =

Annual Japanese music awards ceremony

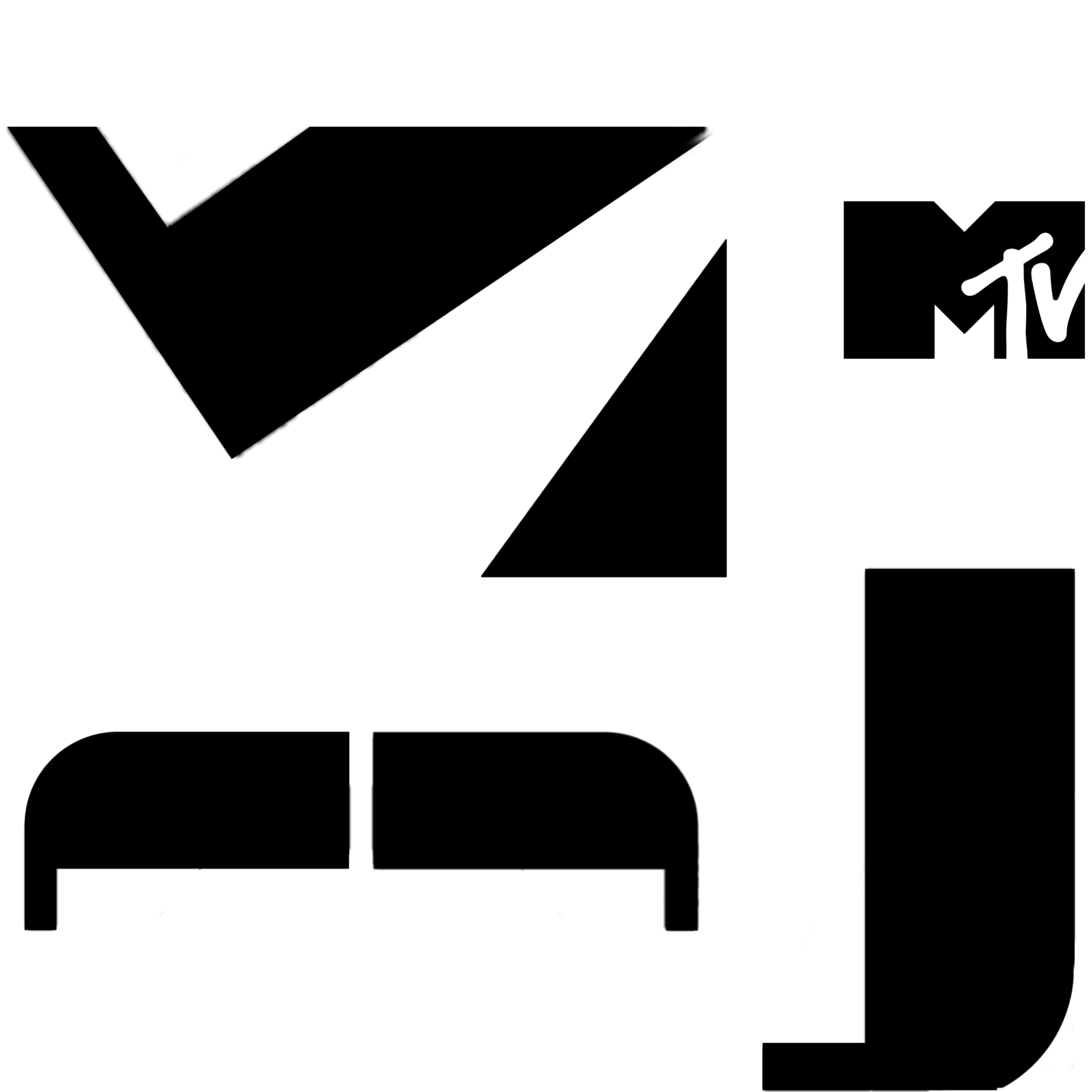
- Date: November 2, 2022
- Country: Japan
- Hosted by: Iwai Yuki; Mukai Satoshi; Yuka Sagai

Television/radio coverage
- Network: MTV Japan

The 2022 MTV Video Music Awards Japan were held on November 2, 2022.

== List of winners ==
=== Video of the Year ===
- Sekai no Owari - Habit

Best Solo Artist Video – Japan:

- Aimer – Zankyōsanka

Best Solo Artist Video – International:

- Harry Styles – As It Was

Best Group Video – Japan:

- Official Hige Dandism – Mixed Nuts

Best Group Video – International:

- Blackpink – Pink Venom

Best New Artist Video – Japan:

- INI – Rocketeer

Best New Artist Video – International:

- Måneskin – Supermodel

Best Rock Video:

- Macaroni Enpitsu – Nandemonai yo,

Best Alternative Video:

- Momoiro Clover Z – Mysterion

Best Pop Video:

- Ryokuoushoku Shakai – Character

Best R&B Video:

- Be First – Betrayal Game

Best Hip Hop Video:

- Sky-Hi – Just Breathe feat. 3racha of Stray Kids

Best Dance Video:

- Sekai no Owari – Habit

Best Collaboration Video:

- Tokyo Ska Paradise Orchestra – Free Free Free feat. Ikuta Lilas

Best Story Video:

- CreepHyp – Night on the Planet

Best Art Direction Video:

- King Gnu – Sakayume

Best Visual Effects:

- Fujii Kaze – Damn

Best Cinematography:

- Radwimps – Ningen Gokko

Best Choreography:

- The Rampage from Exile Tribe – Ray of Light

Inspiration Award Japan:

- Bish

Artist of the Year:

- Vaundy

Song of the Year:

- Ado – New Genesis

Album of the Year:

- Aimyon – Falling into Your Eyes Record

Group of the Year:

- Sakurazaka46

MTV Dance The World Award:

- Takanori Iwata

Best Live Performance:

- JO1

MTV Breakthrough Song:

- Da-ice – Star Mine

Best Buzz Award:

- Ive

Rising Star Award:

- XG

Daisy Bell Award:

- Balloon – Pamela
