= Jujutsu Kaisen season 2 =

Second season of Jujutsu Kaisen

Jujutsu Kaisen
- Season 2
- Cover art for the first Blu-ray volume of Hidden Inventory / Premature Death, featuring Satoru Gojo
- No. of episodes: 23

Release
- Original network: MBS, TBS
- Original release: July 6 – December 28, 2023

Season chronology
- ← Previous; Season 1 Next → Season 3

The second season of the Jujutsu Kaisen anime television series is based on the manga series Jujutsu Kaisen by Gege Akutami. An animated adaptation of the manga was originally announced in the 52nd issue of Weekly Shōnen Jump, which was published in November 2019.

In February 2022, a second season was announced. Shōta Goshozono replaced Sunghoo Park as series director, with Sayaka Koiso and Tadashi Hiramatsu designing the characters and Yoshimasa Terui returning as the sole composer. The season aired from July 6 to December 28, 2023. It ran for two continuous cours and adapted the manga's "Hidden Inventory / Premature Death" and "Shibuya Incident" story arcs. "Hidden Inventory / Premature Death" acts as a prequel to Jujutsu Kaisen 0 and the first season, as it focuses on a teenage Satoru Gojo and Suguru Geto during their time as students at Jujutsu High in 2006 and how the two went from friends to enemies. "Shibuya Incident" takes place back in present-day 2018 as the Sorcerers and Curses engage in an all-out war in Shibuya on Halloween night.

The season is licensed by Crunchyroll for streaming outside of Asia, and began streaming an English dub on July 20, 2023.

== Episodes ==
=== Hidden Inventory / Premature Death ===
No. overall	No. in season	Title	Directed by (Note: Production staff information is taken from the ending credits of each episode.)	Chief animation directed by	Original release date	Viewership rating
25	1	"Hidden Inventory"; Transliteration: "Kaigyoku" (Japanese: 懐玉)	Shōta Goshozono	Sayaka Koiso	July 6, 2023	2.6%
In 2006, second grade sorcerer Utahime Iori and first grade sorcerer Mei Mei investigate a cursed house but become trapped inside. They are rescued by second-year students Satoru Gojo, Suguru Geto, and Shoko Ieiri, who are later reprimanded for their recklessness. Gojo and Geto lightly debate their views on the role of jujutsu sorcerers and the power imbalance between them and regular humans. Their next mission comes from Master Tengen, whose Immortality technique requires him to merge with a compatible individual known as a "Star Plasma Vessel" once every 500 years to prevent him from evolving beyond humanity. Gojo and Geto are assigned to protect the current Vessel, 14-year-old Riko Amanai, who is being targeted by two groups: the curse user sect "Q" and the religious cult Time Vessel Association, which reveres Tengen and opposes the merger, believing it would corrupt his purity. The two are ambushed by Q members. Meanwhile, the Time Vessel Association hires an assassin—Toji Zen'in, now operating under his wife's maiden name Fushiguro—to eliminate Riko.
26	2	"Hidden Inventory 2"; Transliteration: "Kaigyoku -Ni-" (Japanese: 懐玉-弐-)	Yōsuke Takada	Mitsue Mori	July 13, 2023	2.3%
Gojo and Geto easily defeat the Q members and are introduced to Riko and her caretaker, Misato Kuroi. Despite wanting to take her to Jujutsu High immediately for safety, Tengen orders them to allow her to spend the day as she pleases, as once she merges with Tengen, she cannot live a normal life and see her loved ones again. Meanwhile, Toji, aware that he cannot currently defeat Gojo in a direct confrontation, places a 30-million-yen bounty on Riko and waits for other bounty hunters to weaken him first. While fighting an attacker, Gojo struggles to activate his Reverse Cursed Technique: Red, but defeats him using his Six Eyes and Limitless abilities. Shortly after, Riko receives a text message revealing that Kuroi has been kidnapped.
27	3	"Hidden Inventory 3"; Transliteration: "Kaigyoku -San-" (Japanese: 懐玉-参-)	Naoki Miyajima	Reina Igawa, Takako Shimizu & Sayaka Koiso	July 20, 2023	2.2%
Gojo, Geto, and Riko storm the Time Vessel Association's base in Okinawa and rescue Kuroi. With the bounty on Riko still active, they remain on the island and spend time sightseeing until the deadline expires. Geto grows concerned over Gojo's exhaustion, as he has been continuously using his Six Eyes for two days to protect themselves. After the bounty expires, they return to Tokyo Jujutsu High but are ambushed by Toji, who exploits Gojo's fatigue and catches him off guard. While Gojo fights him, Geto escorts Riko and Kuroi to Tengen's lair. Gojo realizes that Toji possesses no cursed energy and was born with a Heavenly Restriction that grants him incredible physical prowess in compensation. Using a special grade cursed tool capable of nullifying cursed techniques, Toji bypasses Gojo's powers and apparently kills him. Meanwhile, in Tengen's lair, Geto tells Riko she can reject the assimilation, having decided with Gojo to defy Tengen if she wishes. Riko admits her wish to continue living a normal life. However, as Geto prepares to leave with her, Toji appears and fatally shoots Riko in the head, leaving Geto in shock.
28	4	"Hidden Inventory 4"; Transliteration: "Kaigyoku -Shi-" (Japanese: 懐玉-肆-)	Arifumi Imai	Yosuke Yajima	July 27, 2023	2.6%
Geto fights Toji and attempts to absorb his cursed spirit but fails, resulting in his defeat. Toji, revealed to also have killed Kuroi, delivers Riko's body to the Time Vessel Association and collects his payment. However, he is confronted by Gojo, who survived their battle by activating his Reverse Cursed Technique for the first time to heal himself. Gojo retaliates with another first: a combination of his Limitless technique, Hollow Purple, which obliterates the left side of Toji's body. Before dying, Toji reveals that his son, Megumi, will be sold to the Zen'in clan in a few years and tells Gojo to do with that information as he will. Geto arrives at the church to find Riko's body with Gojo, who coldly asks if they should kill the non-sorcerer cultists; Geto replies that revenge would be meaningless as there must always be purpose behind a jujutsu sorcerer's actions.
29	5	"Premature Death"; Transliteration: "Gyokusetsu" (Japanese: 玉折)	Directed by : Atsushi Nakagawa; Storyboarded by : Shōta Goshozono	Sota Yamazaki	August 3, 2023	2.0%
One year later, Gojo has grown significantly stronger and is frequently assigned solo missions, leaving Geto increasingly isolated and conflicted with his beliefs about the worth of non-sorcerers. Special grade sorcerer Yuki Tsukumo shares her philosophy that curses can be eradicated if humanity no longer produced cursed energy, which originates from non-sorcerers. Geto concludes that such a world could only be achieved by killing all non-sorcerers, thus forcing an evolution. Two events push him over the edge: the death of his cheerful underclassman Haibara during a mission, and his discovery of the Hasaba sisters—young sorcerers being abused by the non-sorcerer villagers. Now fully despising them, Geto massacres the village and even kills his non-sorcerer parents, resulting in his death sentence. Much to Gojo's dismay, he then declares his plan to create a world with only sorcerers and takes over the Time Vessel Association. Years later, Gojo finds Megumi, now six years old, and takes him under his wing to protect him from the Zen'in clan. In the present, October 2018, Gojo is woken from his nap by Megumi, Yuji, and Nobara.

=== Shibuya Incident ===
No. overall	No. in season	Title	Directed by	Chief animation directed by	Original release date	Viewership rating
30	6	"It's Like That"; Transliteration: "Sō Iu Koto" (Japanese: そういうこと)	Ryota Aikei	Reina Igawa & Sayaka Koiso	August 31, 2023	2.3%
Aoi Todo and Mei Mei officially recommend Yuji, Megumi, Nobara, Maki, and Panda for promotion to Grade 1 sorcerers. During a shopping trip, Nobara meets Yuko, Yuji's former classmate who has a crush on him, and invites Yuji and Megumi to hang out with them. Afterward, Yuji, Megumi, and Nobara meet with Utahime to investigate the traitor within Jujutsu High believed to be working with curses. They deduce it is Kyoto student Muta, but they find his physical body missing. A flashback reveals Muta had made a secret deal with Geto: in exchange for helping them, Mahito would use Idle Transfiguration to heal his severely disabled body. Once healed, Muta immediately fights Mahito and unleashes Ultimate Mechamaru, intending to exorcise the curse and warn Gojo about Geto's plans.
31	7	"Evening Festival"; Transliteration: "Yoimatsuri" (Japanese: 宵祭り)	Directed by : Yooto & Atsushi Nakagawa; Storyboarded by : Yooto & Teppei Okuda	Mitsue Mori	September 7, 2023	N/A
Mahito regenerates most of the damage from Muta's attacks, but Muta manages to launch a cursed energy-imbued missile that damages his soul directly. Mahito activates his Domain Expansion, trapping Muta inside, but Muta counters with a Simple Domain, which destroys Mahito's. As Muta prepares to attack Geto, Mahito—having survived their battle—catches him off guard and kills him. Several days later, on Halloween, a veil is erected over Shibuya, trapping thousands of civilians, who are all manipulated into calling for Gojo. Several sorcerer teams, including Megumi, Nobara, Maki, Nanami, and Panda, are stationed at various entrances around the veil to respond, while Gojo enters it alone.
32	8	"The Shibuya Incident"; Transliteration: "Shibuya Jihen" (Japanese: 渋谷事変)	Hiroyuki Kitakubo	Yosuke Yajima	September 15, 2023 (Note: This episode aired at 12:01 a.m. JST, 5 minutes after the original air time)	N/A
Gojo enters the crowded Shibuya Station, where he confronts the curses Jogo, Hanami, and Choso on the train tracks. Meanwhile, Yuji accompanies Mei Mei and her younger brother Ui Ui to investigate a second veil at a different station. There, they find transfigured humans, indicating Mahito's presence. While Mei Mei and Ui Ui handle the victims, Yuji fights the grasshopper curse guarding the veil and defeats it, dispelling the veil, but finds that Mahito and all the civilians have already disappeared. Following Geto's strategy, Jogo uses the surrounding civilians to limit Gojo's movements and prevent him from using his full power. He and Hanami execute a Domain Amplification, which allows them to neutralize a sorcerer's cursed technique, forcing Gojo to avoid them. Jogo recalls Geto's order to delay Gojo for twenty minutes until Geto arrives with the Prison Realm.
33	9	"Shibuya Incident – Gate, Open"; Transliteration: "Shibuya Jihen – Kaimon" (Japanese: 渋谷事変 開門)	Directed by : Teppei Okuda; Storyboarded by : Shōta Goshozono	Sayaka Koiso, Yosuke Yajima & Mitsue Mori	September 22, 2023	2.2%
After Gojo kills Hanami with his Limitless technique, Mahito releases a thousand transfigured humans into the station, causing mass panic and casualties. With no other option, Gojo activates his Domain Expansion for only 0.2 seconds—enough to immobilize everyone in the area while minimizing psychological harm to the civilians. He then exorcises all the transfigured humans, saving the crowd but severely depleting his energy, as anticipated by Geto. He is then suddenly confronted by the Prison Realm box, and before he can react, Geto greets him. The shock of seeing his deceased friend stuns Gojo, momentarily distracting him with memories of their past and allowing the Prison Realm to subdue him. Gojo then realizes the man before him is not truly Geto; the impostor reveals himself by opening his skull to expose a sentient brain with a mouth. He explains that his cursed technique allows him to transplant his brain into other bodies, and he has taken over Geto's corpse to gain access to his Curse Manipulation. Elsewhere, Yuji learns through a Mechamaru earpiece that Gojo has been sealed.
34	10	"Pandemonium"; Transliteration: "Konran" (Japanese: 昏乱)	Yōsuke Takada	Reina Igawa	September 29, 2023	N/A
Gojo briefly makes contact with the real Geto's residual consciousness, causing Geto's body to momentarily resist the possession by choking itself. The reaction surprises "Pseudo-Geto", but he regains control and the Prison Realm successfully seals Gojo. Yuji hears of the incident through a Mechamaru earpiece—part of a series of fail-safes Muta created in the event of his death and Gojo's sealing. Following Mechamaru's instructions, Yuji loudly announces the seal to alert the other sorcerers. Teams of sorcerers enter the veil; Ijichi is ambushed and stabbed by curse user Haruta Shigemo. Yuji reunites with Nanami, Megumi, and Takuma Ino to strategize their next move. Meanwhile, the Prison Realm strains under Gojo's power from within, forcing Pseudo-Geto to remain nearby and guard the seal until it stabilizes. The curses argue over Yuji's fate—Choso and Mahito want to kill him, while Jogo wishes to resurrect Sukuna; Mahito proposes a challenge on who can find Yuji first.
35	11	"Seance"; Transliteration: "Kōrei" (Japanese: 降霊)	Hayato Kurosaki	Yosuke Yajima, Hiromi Niwa & Reina Igawa	October 6, 2023	N/A
Nanami leaves to find Ijichi in Shibuya Station, instructing Yuji, Megumi, and Ino to investigate the veil preventing sorcerers from entering. The trio encounters the three curse users guarding the veil; Yuji and Megumi engage one of them while Ino fights the remaining two—a grandmother and her grandson. During the confrontation, the curse users boast about finally being free to act without fear of Gojo's power. The grandmother performs a séance, which transforms her grandson into the resurrected body of Toji Fushiguro, whose strength and abilities quickly overpower Ino. Meanwhile, Megumi deduces their opponent's Inverse technique, which reverses the effect of attacks to make powerful strikes weak and weak ones strong. He and Yuji overwhelm him with a barrage of both strong and weak attacks, defeating him.
36	12	"Dull Knife"; Transliteration: "Dontō" (Japanese: 鈍刀)	Shunsuke Okubo	Sayaka Koiso, Reina Igawa & Sota Yamazaki	October 12, 2023	N/A
Nanami finds Ijichi critically wounded and carries him to safety. Meanwhile, Yuji and Megumi destroy the veil that had trapped sorcerers inside the city; however, the veils isolating Gojo and the civilians within Shibuya remain intact. They rescue Ino and split up; Megumi takes Ino to safety outside the veil while Yuji reconvenes with Nanami. Toji's soul completely takes control of the grandson's body and kills the grandmother. Elsewhere, Nobara and Akari fight Haruta but are quickly defeated. Nanami arrives before Haruta can kill them, and, enraged by the attack, brutally beats him before telling the two to await rescue. In the subway tunnels, Pseudo-Geto unleashes a special grade cursed spirit against Mei Mei and Ui Ui. Yuji encounters Choso, who seeks revenge for the deaths of his brothers at the hands of Yuji and Nobara.
37	13	"Red Scale"; Transliteration: "Sekirin" (Japanese: 赫鱗)	Kazuto Arai & Takumi Sunakohara	Yosuke Yajima & Mitsue Mori	October 19, 2023	N/A
Choso pierces through Yuji's left arm with his Blood Manipulation technique. Struggling to defend himself against Choso's assault, Mechamaru instructs Yuji to retreat into a restroom and flood it to dilute Choso's blood. Nonetheless, Choso manages to pierce Yuji's liver. Believing he is dying, Yuji goes all out to kill Choso, hoping his sacrifice will help the others save Gojo, but Choso uses a blood shield to block Yuji's Divergent Fist. As Choso is about to kill him, he is suddenly overwhelmed by fabricated memories with Yuji, in which Yuji addresses him as his brother. Confused, Choso halts the fight and wanders away, while the Hasaba sisters find the unconscious Yuji.
38	14	"Fluctuations"; Transliteration: "Yōtō" (Japanese: 揺蕩)	Tō Tatsuta	Kazutaka Sugiyama, Shun & Yosuke Yajima	October 26, 2023	N/A
Mei Mei defeats the Smallpox Deity cursed spirit by using Ui Ui and her crows as a distraction; after the battle, the siblings are confronted by Pseudo-Geto. In Shibuya Station, Nanami, Maki, and Naobito face the cursed spirit Dagon, who has transformed from a cursed womb into his fully evolved form. Dagon activates his Domain Expansion; within the domain, Nanami and Naobito are consumed by a horde of his shikigami. From outside, Megumi activates his own Domain Expansion, which disrupts Dagon's and creates a weak point. Nanami and Naobito survive, but before the three can escape, Toji emerges through the domain's escape route.
39	15	"Fluctuations, Part 2"; Transliteration: "Yōtō -Ni-" (Japanese: 揺蕩-弐-)	Directed by : Isuta, Ryota Aikei, Hayato Kurosaki, Teppei Okuda & Fei-hung; Storyboarded by : Takao Abo & Isuta	Reina Igawa & Ya Zhi Lu	November 2, 2023	2.4%
With Maki's cursed tool, Toji instinctively targets Dagon, the strongest presence nearby, and easily defeats and exorcises him, destroying his domain. Toji then targets Megumi and launches him outside the building to fight. Just then, Jogo arrives and mourns Dagon before abruptly incinerating Nanami, Maki, and Naobito in retaliation. Sensing Sukuna's presence, Jogo finds the Hasaba sisters feeding one of Sukuna's fingers to the unconscious Yuji. He forcefully feeds Yuji an additional ten fingers, raising the total to fifteen, causing Sukuna to awaken and temporarily possess Yuji. The sisters plead with Sukuna to kill the impostor inhabiting Geto's body and offer the location of another finger as payment. However, annoyed by their audacity, Sukuna brutally kills them. He then makes a deal with Jogo: if Jogo can land a single hit on him, Sukuna will help their group and spare only one person in Shibuya—Megumi.
40	16	"Thunderclap"; Transliteration: "Hekireki" (Japanese: 霹靂)	Itsuki Tsuchigami	Sota Yamazaki	November 9, 2023	2.4%
Megumi fights Toji but is overwhelmed. Upon stabbing Megumi, Toji suddenly recognizes his son and briefly regains his humanity. He recalls his past decision to sell Megumi to the Zen'in clan, having believed it would secure a better future for him. Proud that Megumi rejected the Zen'in name, Toji stabs his vessel in the head to end the possession. Before Megumi can recover, he is immediately attacked by Haruta. Meanwhile, Sukuna and Jogo engage in a destructive battle that ravages Shibuya. Sukuna toys with Jogo before unleashing his "Open" technique, revealing his ability to also wield fire, which incinerates Jogo almost instantly. In a liminal afterlife, Jogo reunites with Hanami and Dagon and states they were more human than they realized. Sukuna acknowledges Jogo's strength and conviction, causing Jogo to cry before fading. As Sukuna reunites with Uraume, a mysterious curse user from his past, a cursed spirit begins attacking Haruta, who pleads for the unconscious Megumi to awaken.
41	17	"Thunderclap, Part 2"; Transliteration: "Hekireki -Ni-" (Japanese: 霹靂-弐-)	Itsuki Tsuchigami, Hakuyu Go & Harumi Yamazaki	N/A	November 16, 2023	N/A
Near death at the hands of Haruta, Megumi resorts to summoning Mahoraga, the most powerful shikigami of his Ten Shadows Technique, which no previous user has ever successfully subjugated. The ritual renders Megumi unconscious, as tradition dictates that the summoner remains in a death-like state until Mahoraga is either defeated or kills both the summoner and their target. Before Mahoraga can kill Haruta, Sukuna, who recognizes the summoning and plans to preserve Megumi, intervenes and battles Mahoraga himself. Countering Mahoraga's technique to adapt to any attack, Sukuna activates his Domain Expansion, Malevolent Shrine, which unleashes indiscriminate slashes across a 140-meter radius, further devastating the city while severely wounding Mahoraga and killing Haruta. In the aftermath, Sukuna secretly delivers the unconscious Megumi to Shoko for treatment and relinquishes control of Yuji, leaving Yuji devastated by the carnage committed in his body. Meanwhile, a severely burned Nanami wanders the subway, still alive.
42	18	"Right and Wrong"; Transliteration: "Rihi" (Japanese: 理非)	Directed by : Shōta Goshozono & Yōsuke Takada; Storyboarded by : Shōta Goshozono	Sayaka Koiso & Mitsue Mori	November 23, 2023	N/A
Nanami, gravely injured and delirious, thinks about his unfulfilled dream of relaxing by a beach in Malaysia as he faces a horde of transfigured humans. Using the last of his strength, he manages to defeat them, but Mahito appears and touches his back to use Idle Transfiguration. In his final moments, Nanami contemplates his life choices and envisions Haibara, who gestures toward a shocked Yuji, having witnessed the encounter. Nanami entrusts everything to Yuji before dying. Devastated by the relentless tragedy around him, Yuji fiercely battles Mahito, who senses Yuji's vulnerability. Meanwhile, a clone of Mahito encounters Nobara on the streets and, recognizing her closeness to Yuji, targets her to drive Yuji further into despair.
43	19	"Right and Wrong, Part 2"; Transliteration: "Rihi -Ni-" (Japanese: 理非-弐-)	Naoki Miyajima	Reina Igawa	November 30, 2023	N/A
After Akari is taken to safety, Nobara re-enters the veil, unwilling to stay behind while her friends continue to fight. She encounters Mahito's clone, who, unlike the original Mahito, cannot use Idle Transfiguration. Nobara uses her Resonance technique, which unexpectedly damages both the clone and the original Mahito, who is simultaneously battling Yuji in the subway station. Realizing this, Yuji is reinvigorated knowing he is not fighting alone. Both Mahitos then lure their respective opponents into a corridor, where they suddenly switch places, allowing the real Mahito to land a direct hit on Nobara's face with Idle Transfiguration. As she begins to lose consciousness, Nobara recalls her childhood in a rural village, her friendship with Fumi, and her admiration for Saori, who was driven away by the villagers. Elsewhere, Saori, now in her twenties, remembers Nobara fondly. Nobara then sees the faces of her friends in the liminal afterlife and, smiling, tells Yuji to let everyone know her life "wasn't so bad". Moments later, the left side of her face explodes from Mahito's technique, and she collapses in front of Yuji.
44	20	"Right and Wrong, Part 3"; Transliteration: "Rihi -San-" (Japanese: 理非-参-)	Yūji Tokuno	Hiromi Niwa, Sota Yamazaki, Mitsue Mori & Yuriko Ishii	December 7, 2023	2.3%
Yuji goes into a state of shock upon seeing Nobara's seemingly lifeless body. Overwhelmed with guilt, he is left vulnerable, allowing Mahito to land several blows on him and execute a Black Flash. Just before Mahito can finish him off, however, Todo intervenes, saving Yuji and attempting to re-energize him. Meanwhile, Arata Nitta begins treating Yuji's injuries and attempts emergency treatment on Nobara, revealing that there is a slim chance she may survive. Todo and Yuji fight Mahito as the remaining Kyoto students head to Shibuya to provide backup. They had been kept away by Mechamaru's puppet, which had been acting independently to protect them, believing that only Todo and Arata had a real chance of surviving. Mahito then releases a massive wave of transfigured humans to force the battle out into the streets.
45	21	"Metamorphosis"; Transliteration: "Henshin" (Japanese: 変身)	Tetsuya Akutsu	Yosuke Yajima, Sayaka Koiso, Sota Yamazaki & Hiromi Niwa	December 14, 2023	N/A
Yuji and Todo continue to battle Mahito, who attempts to separate the pair but is unsuccessful. To counter the risk of Sukuna retaliating for touching Yuji's soul, Mahito emulates Gojo and briefly activates a 0.2-second Domain Expansion, allowing him to land a hit on Todo. However, Todo amputates his hand before the effects of Idle Transfiguration can take hold. He activates his cursed technique by clapping Mahito's hand, confusing the curse and enabling Yuji to land a Black Flash that directly strikes Mahito's soul. Mahito fully grasps the true shape of his soul and uses Idle Transfiguration on himself to transform into his ultimate form: the "Instant Spirit Body of Distorted Killing". Todo tricks Mahito into believing he can still use his Cursed Technique, allowing Yuji to land another Black Flash, which destroys Mahito's enhanced form. Yuji coldly declares he will kill Mahito as many times as necessary. As Mahito, now panicked and desperate, tries to escape, he is stopped by Pseudo-Geto, who offers to save him.
46	22	"Metamorphosis, Part 2"; Transliteration: "Henshin -Ni-" (Japanese: 変身-弐-)	Directed by : Ryota Aikei & Yōsuke Takada; Storyboarded by : Ryota Aikei	Reina Igawa, Yosuke Yajima, Yuriko Ishii, Mitsue Mori, Sota Yamazaki & Hiromi Niwa	December 22, 2023 (Note: This episode aired at 12:26 a.m. JST, 30 minutes after the original air time)	N/A
Mei Mei and Ui Ui flee to Malaysia. Meanwhile, Pseudo-Geto absorbs and consumes Mahito to acquire his Cursed Technique. As the Kyoto students arrive, Miwa launches an attack, prompting Pseudo-Geto to respond with Maximum: Uzumaki. Kusakabe intervenes and successfully deflects the attack. Choso also arrives on the scene and publicly reveals Pseudo-Geto's true identity: Noritoshi Kamo, historically regarded as the most evil sorcerer. However, Pseudo-Geto further reveals that Noritoshi Kamo is only one of several identities he has assumed over the centuries. Choso, having realized that Yuji is his younger brother, fights Pseudo-Geto but is overpowered. The other sorcerers attempt to help but are intercepted by Uraume, who uses their Frost Calm Cursed Technique to freeze the battlefield in ice. Just as Uraume prepares to eliminate them, Yuki Tsukumo arrives to join the fight.
47	23	"Shibuya Incident – Gate, Close"; Transliteration: "Shibuya Jihen – Heimon" (Japanese: 渋谷事変 閉門)	Shōta Goshozono	Sayaka Koiso, Hiromi Niwa, Reina Igawa, Yosuke Yajima & Sota Yamazaki	December 28, 2023	3.1%
Yuki confronts Pseudo-Geto over their conflicting ideologies, with the former believing in advancing human evolution by eliminating cursed energy, while the latter believes in refining and maximizing its use. During their standoff, Pseudo-Geto activates Idle Transfiguration on two distinct groups of non-sorcerers across Japan: those who, like Yuji, have ingested cursed objects, and those with dormant cursed techniques, such as Junpei, forcibly transforming them into sorcerers; among those awakened is Tsumiki Fushiguro. Pseudo-Geto reveals his plan to incite conflict between these newly transformed groups to further his understanding of cursed energy. He releases ten million cursed spirits across Japan, creating widespread chaos and enabling his faction's escape. Before departing, he addresses Sukuna and declares his intent to resurrect the Heian era—the golden age of jujutsu sorcery. In the aftermath, the Japanese government begins preparing to disclose the existence of cursed energy to the public due to the threat of cursed spirits. Meanwhile, the Jujutsu Headquarters issues rulings in response to the Shibuya Incident: Gojo is declared an accomplice, Principal Yaga is sentenced to death, and Yuji Itadori's execution is reissued, with Yuta Okkotsu appointed as his executioner.

== Recap specials ==
No. overall	No. in season	Title	Original release date	Viewership rating
29.25	SP–1	"Season 2 + Movie Recap"; Transliteration: "Kanwa Zenpen" (Japanese: 閑話前編)	August 10, 2023	2.2%
A recap special covering events from the second season's "Hidden Inventory / Premature Death" story arc and the Jujutsu Kaisen 0 film
29.75	SP–2	"Season 1 Recap"; Transliteration: "Kanwa Kōhen" (Japanese: 閑話後編)	August 17, 2023	N/A
A recap special covering events from the first season

== Music ==
The opening theme song for the first five episodes (covering the "Hidden Inventory / Premature Death" arc) is "Where Our Blue Is" (青のすみか, Ao no Sumika; lit. 'House of Blue'), performed by Tatsuya Kitani, while the ending theme song is "Akari" (燈; lit. 'Light'), performed by Soushi Sakiyama. For episode six onwards (covering the "Shibuya Incident" arc), the opening theme song is "Specialz", performed by King Gnu, while the ending theme song is "More than Words", performed by Hitsujibungaku.

The music for the second season was composed by Yoshimasa Terui. The soundtracks for the Hidden Inventory / Premature Death and Shibuya Incident arcs were respectively released on August 6, 2023, and January 24, 2024.

== Home media release ==
=== Japanese ===
Vol.		Date	Discs	Episodes
Hidden Inventory / Premature Death (Note: Kaigyoku / Gyokusetsu (懐玉・玉折))	1	October 18, 2023	1	25–27
Hidden Inventory / Premature Death	2	November 22, 2023	1	28–29
Shibuya Incident (Note: Shibuya Jihen (渋谷事変))	1	December 20, 2023	1	30–32
Shibuya Incident	2	January 24, 2024	1	33–35
Shibuya Incident	3	February 21, 2024	1	36–38
Shibuya Incident	4	March 20, 2024	1	39–41
Shibuya Incident	5	April 17, 2024	1	42–44
Shibuya Incident	6	May 22, 2024	1	45–47

=== English ===
Arc	Date	Discs	Episodes
Hidden Inventory / Premature Death	February 4, 2025	2	25–29
Shibuya Incident	March 18, 2025	6	30–47
