= Sanmon Shosetsu/Senryo Yakusha =

2020 single by King Gnu

"Sanmon Shōsetsu/Senryō Yakusha"

Single by King Gnu

from the album The Greatest Unknown
- Language: Japanese
- Released: December 2, 2020
- Genre: J-pop; alternative rock
- Length: 7:40
- Label: Ariola Japan
- Songwriter: Daiki Tsuneta
- Producer: Daiki Tsuneta

King Gnu singles chronology
"Umbrella" (2019)	"Sanmon Shōsetsu/Senryō Yakusha" (2020)	"Abuku" (2021)

Music videos
- "Sanmon Shōsetsu" on YouTube
- "Senryō Yakusha" on YouTube

"Sanmon Shōsetsu" (Japanese: 三文小説; lit. 'dime novel') and "Senryō Yakusha" (Japanese: 千両役者; lit. 'star actor') are songs by Japanese band King Gnu. "Sanmon Shōsetsu" was first released as a digital single on October 30, 2020, through Ariola Japan. It was later released together with "Senryō Yakusha" as a double A-side single on December 2, serving as the lead single for their fourth studio album The Greatest Unknown.

== Background and release ==
On September 24, 2020, it was announced that King Gnu would be providing "Sanmon Shōsetsu" as the theme song for the Nippon TV drama A Girl of 35, starring Ko Shibasaki. They later announced that they would release the song alongside "Senryō Yakusha", the theme song for NTT Docomo's 5G commercial "Let's Accelerate Hope 2nd", as a double A-side single in December. It was also announced that "Sanmon Shōsetsu" would begin airing on cable and radio on October 19, with a digital release for the song on October 30. This marked approximately nine months since their last major release, their third studio album Ceremony in January.

The single was released on December 2, 2020, in two versions: a standard edition and a first-press limited edition including a Blu-ray Disc featuring footage of their live performance at Hibiya Open-Air Concert Hall in Tokyo held in October 2019.

== Music videos ==
=== "Sanmon Shōsetsu" ===
The music video for "Sanmon Shōsetsu" premiered on November 6, 2020. Directed by Osrin of Perimetron, it depicts a man and a woman on a rotating stage with images of their lives projected behind them.

=== "Senryō Yakusha" ===
The music video for "Senryō Yakusha" was released on December 2, 2020, the same day as the single release. Directed by Margt of Perimetron, it tells the story of a man who dreamed of becoming a star actor.

== Charts ==
=== Weekly charts ===
Weekly chart performance for "Sanmon Shōsetsu"
Chart (2020-2021)	Peak position
Japan (Oricon) with "Senryō Yakusha"	2
Japan (Japan Hot 100)	4

Weekly chart performance for "Senryō Yakusha"
Chart (2020-2021)	Peak position
Japan (Oricon) with "Sanmon Shōsetsu"	2
Japan (Japan Hot 100)	12

=== Year-end charts ===
Year-end performance for "Sanmon Shōsetsu"
Chart (2021)	Position
Japan (Japan Hot 100)	58

== Certifications ==
Certifications for "Sanmon Shōsetsu"
Region	Certification	Certified units/sales
Japan (RIAJ) Physical with "Senryō Yakusha"	Gold	100,000^{^}
Japan (RIAJ) Digital	Gold	100,000^{*}
Streaming
Japan (RIAJ)	Platinum	100,000,000^{†}
^{*} Sales figures based on certification alone.^{^} Shipments figures based on certification alone.^{†} Streaming-only figures based on certification alone.

Certifications for "Senryō Yakusha"
Region	Certification	Certified units/sales
Japan (RIAJ) Physical with "Sanmon Shōsetsu"	Gold	100,000^{^}
Streaming
Japan (RIAJ)	Gold	50,000,000^{†}
^{^} Shipments figures based on certification alone.^{†} Streaming-only figures based on certification alone.
