= Chameleon (King Gnu song) =

2022 single by King Gnu

Single by King Gnu

from the album The Greatest Unknown
- Language: Japanese
- Released: February 28, 2022
- Genre: J-pop; alternative rock
- Length: 3:13
- Label: Ariola Japan
- Songwriter: Daiki Tsuneta
- Producer: Daiki Tsuneta

King Gnu singles chronology
"Ichizu/Sakayume" (2021)	"Chameleon" (2022)	"Ame Sansan" (2022)

Music video
- "Chameleon" on YouTube

"Chameleon" (Japanese: カメレオン, Hepburn: Kamereon) is a song by Japanese band King Gnu. It was released as a digital single on February 28, 2022 as the theme song for the live-action adaptation of the Japanese manga series Don't Call It Mystery. It was later released as a CD single on March 16 through Ariola Japan.

== Background and release ==
On January 9, 2022, a premiere screening event was held for the live-action adaptation of Don't Call It Mystery at United Cinemas Aqua City Odaiba in Tokyo. King Gnu made a guest appearance towards the end of the event and announced they would be performing the theme song for the series, titled "Chameleon". The song premiered alongside the series's first episode, which airing the following day on January 10. On February 7, the contents of the single were revealed. It would be released in two versions: a standard edition with the CD and a first-press limited edition including it and a Blu-ray Disc containing footage of King Gnu's Red Bull Secret Gig live performance held at Second Sea Fort in Tokyo Bay on June 15, 2021.

"Chameleon" was officially released digitally on February 28, 2022. The standard and limited editions of the CD single were released on March 16, 2022.

== Composition and lyrics ==
"Chameleon" is a J-pop and alternative rock song, composed in the key of C major and is set in time signature of common time with a tempo of 80 BPM. Written, composed, and produced by King Gnu vocalist and guitarist Daiki Tsuneta, it was created specifically for the series. Tsuneta said that he wrote the song "thinking that there is love in continuing to face the complex creatures that humans are". Masaki Suda, who played Totonō, the series protagonist, commented that "the lyrics link Totonō with the voice and melody that come to light as he confronts life, the times, and the system".

== Music video ==
A music video directed by Osrin of Japanese creative collective Perimetron was released on March 14, 2022. It was King Gnu's first music video made entirely using computer graphics.

== Live performances ==
On March 4, 2022, King Gnu performed "Chameleon" for the first time on live television on Music Station. On March 20, the band performed the song, as well as "Ichizu", "Sakayume", and "Boy", on the music program Love Music. King Gnu also performed the song on a three-hour special of Count Down TV on April 18.

== Track listing ==
All tracks are written by Daiki Tsuneta.

CD / digital download / streaming – standard edition
No.	Title	Length
1.	"Chameleon" (カメレオン)	3:13
2.	"Chameleon" (instrumental)	3:13
Total length:		6:26

Blu-ray – first-press limited edition: Red Bull Secret Gig (June 5th, 2021 at Second Sea Fort)
No.	Title	Length
1.	"Senryō Yakusha" (千両役者)
2.	"Sorrows"
3.	"Umbrella" (傘)
4.	"McDonald Romance"
5.	"Hikōtei" (飛行艇)
6.	"Slumberland"
7.	"The Hole"
8.	"Teenager Forever"
9.	"Summer Rain Diver" (サマーレイン・ダイバー)

== Credits and personnel ==
Credits adapted from Apple Music.

- Daiki Tsuneta – vocals, guitar, composer, songwriter
- Kazuki Arai – bass
- Satoru Iguchi – vocals, keyboards
- Yū Seki – drums
- King Gnu – producer

== Charts ==
=== Weekly charts ===
Weekly chart performance for "Chameleon"
Chart (2022-2023)	Peak position
Global 200 (Billboard)	63
Japan (Japan Hot 100)	1
Japan (Oricon)	2

=== Year-end charts ===
2022 year-end chart performance for "Chameleon"
Chart (2022)	Peak position
Japan (Japan Hot 100)	22
Japan (Oricon)	10

2023 year-end chart performance for "Chameleon"
Chart (2023)	Peak position
Japan (Japan Hot 100)	84

== Certifications ==
Certifications for "Chameleon"
Region	Certification	Certified units/sales
Japan (RIAJ) Digital	Gold	100,000^{*}
Streaming
Japan (RIAJ)	3× Platinum	300,000,000^{†}
^{*} Sales figures based on certification alone.^{†} Streaming-only figures based on certification alone.
