= Habit (song) =

Single by Sekai no Owari
- Released: June 22, 2022
- Length: 12:35
- Label: Virgin
- Composer: Nakajin
- Lyricist: Fukase
- Producer: Sekai no Owari

Sekai no Owari singles chronology
"Diary" (2021)	"Habit" (2022)	"Saraba" (2023)

Music video
- "Habit" on YouTube

"Habit" is a song by Japanese pop band Sekai no Owari. The song was a hit in Japan, winning the Grand Prix at the 64th Japan Record Awards. The single was released digitally on April 28, 2022, and CD single was released on June 22.

== Reception ==
The song was initially released as the theme for a live-action film based on the manga series xxxHolic. The song proved to be very popular, topping the Billboard Japan Hot 100. The single also peaked at number four on the Oricon Singles Chart.

== Music video ==
Habit's music video was critically praised, winning the MTV Japan award for Video of the Year, along with the award for Best Dance Video. It features the band members acting as staff members in a school, with professional dancers as students. The video was directed by Dai Ikeda.

== Track listing ==
All tracks are arranged by Sekai no Owari.

"Habit" track listing
No.	Title	Lyrics	Music	Length
1.	"Habit"	Fukase	Nakajin	4:15
2.	"Eve"	Fukase	Nakajin	4:03
3.	"Kagerou" (陽炎; Fukase version)	Saori	Saori	4:17
Total length:				12:35

== Personnel ==
Credits adapted from YouTube.

- Sekai No Owari - producer (all tracks), associated performer (all tracks), recording arranger (all tracks)
  - Fukase - associated performer (all tracks), vocals (all tracks), lyrics (tracks 1–2)
  - Saori - associated performer (tracks 1–2), piano (tracks 1–2), composer (track 3), lyricist (track 3)
  - Nakajin - associated performer (all tracks), guitar (tracks 1–2), bass (tracks 1–2), programming (tracks 1–2), composer (tracks 1–2), background vocalist (tracks 2–3)
- Mike Marrington - associated performer (track 1), drums (track 1)
- Kazuya Maeda - studio personnel (tracks 1–2), recording engineer (tracks 1–2), mixer (tracks 1–2), vocal engineer, vocal editing (track 3)
- Chris Gehringer - studio personnel (all tracks), mastering engineer (all tracks)
- Yaffle - associated performer (track 3), recording arranger (track 3), producer (track 3), programmer (track 3), studio personnel (track 3), editor (track 3)
- D.O.I. - studio personnel (track 3), mixer (track 3)

== Charts ==
=== Weekly charts ===
Weekly chart performance for "Habit"
Chart (2023)	Peak position
Global 200 (Billboard)	90
Japan (Japan Hot 100)	1
Japan (Oricon)	4
Japan Combined Singles (Oricon)	3

=== Monthly charts ===
Monthly chart performance for "Habit"
Chart (2023)	Position
Japan (Oricon)	10

=== Year-end charts ===
2022 year-end chart performance for "Habit"
Chart (2022)	Position
Japan (Japan Hot 100)	11
Japan Streaming (Oricon)	8

2023 year-end chart performance for "Habit"
Chart (2023)	Position
Japan (Japan Hot 100)	22

2024 year-end chart performance for "Habit"
Chart (2024)	Position
Japan (Japan Hot 100)	100

== Certifications ==
Certifications for "Habit"
Region	Certification	Certified units/sales
Japan (RIAJ) Digital	Gold	100,000^{*}
Streaming
Japan (RIAJ)	3× Platinum	300,000,000^{†}
^{*} Sales figures based on certification alone.^{†} Streaming-only figures based on certification alone.

== See also ==
- List of Hot 100 number-one singles of 2022 (Japan)

Preceded by "Citrus" (Da-ice)	Japan Record Award Grand Prix; 2022	Succeeded by "Que Sera Sera" (Mrs. Green Apple)
