= Ceremony (King Gnu album) =

2020 studio album by King Gnu

Studio album by King Gnu
- Released: January 15, 2020
- Genre: J-pop; alternative rock
- Length: 36:48
- Label: Ariola Japan
- Producer: Daiki Tsuneta

King Gnu chronology
Sympa (2019)	Ceremony (2020)

Ceremony is the third studio album by Japanese alternative rock band King Gnu. It was released on January 15, 2020, by Ariola Japan. All songs were composed by the group's frontman, Daiki Tsuneta. Built on the group's alternative rock sound, the album's genre-spanning production incorporates hip hop, soul, and classical. Ceremony was a commercial success, peaking atop the Japanese Oricon albums chart, the Billboard Japan albums chart, and was one of the 10 best-selling albums of 2020 worldwide.

== Release ==
Ceremony was released on January 15, 2020, by Ariola Japan. It was available on two formats: CD, and CD+Blu-ray. Ceremony, along with King Gnu's previous studio albums Tokyo Rendez-Vous and Sympa, was released on vinyl on December 2, 2020.

== Awards ==
Ceremony was one of the award-winning albums at the 2021 CD Shop Awards. It was one of the "five best albums" at the 2021 Japan Gold Disc Awards.

== Commercial performance ==
Ceremony debuted at number one on the Japanese Oricon albums chart, with first-week sales of 238,000 physical copies and 30,000 digital copies. The album spent 18 weeks in the top 10 of Billboard Japan's Hot Albums Chart, including four weeks at number one on the component Download Albums Chart.

== Track listing ==
All lyrics are written by Daiki Tsuneta; all music is composed by King Gnu.

Ceremony track listing
No.	Title	Length
1.	"Kaikai-shiki" (開会式; "Opening Ceremony")	0:48
2.	"Doron" (どろん)	3:02
3.	"Teenager Forever"	3:09
4.	"Humor" (ユーモア)	3:27
5.	"Hakujitsu" (白日)	4:36
6.	"Maku-ai" (幕間; "Interlude")	0:56
7.	"Hikōtei" (飛行艇)	4:20
8.	"Chīsana Waku-sei" (小さな惑星; "Small Planet")	2:31
9.	"Overflow"	3:21
10.	"Kasa" (傘; "Umbrella")	3:23
11.	"Danjo" (壇上)	5:40
12.	"Heikai-shiki" (閉会式; "Closing Ceremony")	1:29
Total length:		36:48

== Charts ==
=== Weekly charts ===
Weekly chart performance of Ceremony
Chart (2020)	Peak position
Japan Hot Albums (Billboard Japan)	1
Japanese Albums (Oricon)	1

=== Year-end charts ===
2020 year-end chart performance of Ceremony
Chart (2020)	Position
Japan Hot Albums (Billboard Japan)	2
Japanese Albums (Oricon)	6

== Certifications and sales ==
Region	Certification	Certified units/sales
Japan (RIAJ)	2× Platinum	500,000^{^}
Japan (RIAJ)	Gold	100,000^{*}
Summaries
Worldwide	—	1,000,000
^{*} Sales figures based on certification alone.^{^} Shipments figures based on certification alone.
