= 2019 MTV Video Music Awards Japan =

Annual Japanese music awards ceremony

- Date: September 18, 2019
- Hosted by: Hinatazaka46

Television/radio coverage
- Network: MTV Japan

The 2019 MTV Video Music Awards Japan were held on September 18, 2019.

== Abstract ==
"Best Video of the Year" is determined by public voting. It's announced with two special awards (BALLISTIK BOYZ and Foorin) at the ceremony. King Gnu won the Best Video of the year, it's only 8 months from their major debut, it's the fastest in the history of MTV VMAJ. While Foorin is the youngest artist of the winners at the ceremony.

== Main awards ==
=== Best Video of the Year ===
King Gnu – "Hakujitsu"

=== Best Male Video ===
Japan Daichi Miura — "Katasumi" (片隅, corner) | International Khalid — "Talk"

=== Best Female Video ===
Japan Aimyon — "Kon'ya kono mama" (今夜このまま, Let the Night) | International Taylor Swift — "Me!"

=== Best Group Video ===
Japan Keyakizaka46 — "Kuroi Hitsuji" (黒い羊, Black Sheep) | International The 1975 — "Sincerity Is Scary"

=== Best New Artist Video ===
Japan King Gnu – "Hakujitsu" (白日, White Day) | International Billie Eilish – "Bad Guy"

=== Best Rock Video ===
Bump of Chicken – "Aurora"

=== Best Alternative Video ===
BiSH – "Stereo future"

=== Best Pop Video ===
Masaki Suda – "Machigai sagashi" (まちがいさがし, Looking for mistakes)

=== Best Hip Hop Video ===
KREVA – "Neiro~2019 Ver.~" (音色 ～2019 Ver.～, Tone~2019 Ver.~)

=== Best Dance Video ===
Sakanaction – "Wasurerarenai no" (忘れられないの, I can't forget)

=== Best Collaboration Video ===
Ringo Sheena and Hiroji Miyamoto – "Kemono yuku hosomichi" (獣ゆく細道, The Narrow Way)

=== Best Choreography ===
Hinatazaka46 – "Kyun" (キュン)

== Special awards ==
=== MTV Rock the World Award ===
Glay

=== Artist of the Year ===
One Ok Rock

=== Song of the Year ===
Official Hige Dandism - Pretender

=== Best Album of the Year ===
Gen Hoshino - Pop Virus

=== Best Buzz Award ===
BTS

=== Rising Star Award ===
The Boyz

Ballistik Boyz from Exile Tribe

=== MTV Breakthrough Song ===
Foorin - Paprika
