= King Gnu =

Japanese band

- Also known as: Mrs.Vinci (2013); Srv.Vinci (2013–2017)
- Origin: Japan
- Genres: J-pop; alternative rock; indie pop; nu jazz
- Years active: 2013–present
- Labels: Perimetron; Ariola Japan
- Members: Daiki Tsuneta; Yū Seki; Kazuki Arai; Satoru Iguchi
- Past members: Shun Ishiwaka
- Website: kinggnu.jp

King Gnu is a Japanese band formed in 2013. It consists of Daiki Tsuneta (vocalist and guitarist), Satoru Iguchi (vocalist and keyboardist), Kazuki Arai (bassist) and Yu Seki (drummer). The band's main songwriter is Daiki Tsuneta, who also performs as part of the creative collective Millennium Parade.

== Career ==
In 2013, Mrs.Vinci was formed, later going by Srv.Vinci. Their first song was "ABUKU(泡)" released under the creative label Perimetron.

In 2017, they renamed themselves to King Gnu. They then performed at the Fuji Rock Festival in 2017 and 2018. On October 25, 2017, the band released their first album under the name King Gnu, Tokyo Rendez-Vous. The track "Vinyl" was used in a Persol Tempstaff advertisement released on January 25 the next year.

In January 2019, the band released Sympa, their first release under a major label after signing to Ariola Japan. The following month, King Gnu released hit song "Hakujitsu", which ranked No.4 in the year-end chart of Billboard Japan Hot 100. In October, they released "Kasa" and achieved their first No.1 on the Billboard Japan Download Chart. On December 31, King Gnu performed "Hakujitsu" at the 70th NHK Kōhaku Uta Gassen, their debut performance on the program.

Their third album Ceremony, released on January 15, 2020, was a commercial success, peaking atop the Japanese Oricon albums chart, the Billboard Japan albums chart, and was one of the 10 best-selling albums of 2020 worldwide by selling over one million copies. A nationwide tour for the album was scheduled but all performances were postponed due to the COVID-19 pandemic. The band held their first online live concert in August. On September 8, it was announced that King Gnu would be the first Japanese artist to sign a partnership agreement with Red Bull.

In August 2021, it was announced that King Gnu would perform the opening theme song "Boy" for the anime adaptation of Ranking of Kings; the song was released in October. In December, MAPPA released a few movie trailers promoting the Jujutsu Kaisen 0 anime film adaptation, which King Gnu have made 2 new songs for the film. The songs are "Ichizu" (一途; "The Only Way") and "Sakayume" (逆夢; "Contradictory Dream"), which are the opening and ending themes for the Jujutsu Kaisen movie. The two songs were released together as Ichizu/Sakayume. In March 2022, they released "Chameleon" (カメレオン, Kamereon), which is the theme for Japanese television drama Don't Call It Mystery, adapted from the manga of the same name. In November 2022, they played one of the biggest concerts of their career, performed in two days concerts with attended more than 100,000 fans at Tokyo Dome.

King Gnu held their biggest tour ever in Japan "Closing Ceremony" on May and June 2023, which saw them play at stadiums five years after their debut for the first time in Nagai Stadium and Yokohama Nissan Stadium. They released "Specialz" as the opening theme for the Shibuya Incident Arc, the second part of the second season of the Jujutsu Kaisen anime on September 1.

In March 2025, it was announced that King Gnu would perform the ending theme for Detective Conan: One-eyed Flashback, "Twilight!!!".

In September 2025, King Gnu released the song "So Bad", created as the exclusive official theme for Universal Studios Japan’s Zombie de Dance: Halloween Horror Nights event.

On January 9, 2026, King Gnu released their single "Aizo", to serve as the opening theme for Jujutsu Kaisen's Culling Game Arc. On July 29, they released their single "Go Ghost", to serve as the opening theme for The Ghost in the Shell.

== Discography ==
=== Studio albums ===
Title	Details	Peak chart positions		Sales	Certifications
Title	Details	JPN	JPN Hot	Sales	Certifications
Srv. Vinci
Mad Me More Softly	Released: September 16, 2015; Label: Perimetron; Formats: CD, digital download, streaming; Track listing: 1. "Devil's MC"; 2. "PPL"; 3. "Heroine"; 4. "Those Sunny Smiles"; 5. "Mommy's Tummy"; 6. "Zero Gravity Toilet"; 7. "Diving to You"; 8. "Abnormal Pressure"; 9. "Plastic Rain"; 10. "'I'm Outta Here.'"	—	—	—N/a	
King Gnu
Tokyo Rendez-Vous	Released: October 25, 2017; Reissued: January 16, 2019; Label: Perimetron, Ariola Japan; Formats: CD, digital download, streaming; Track listing: 1. "Tokyo Rendez-Vous"; 2. "McDonald Romance"; 3. "Anataha Shinkirou" (あなたは蜃気楼); 4. "Vinyl"; 5. "Haretsu" (破裂); 6. "Low Love"; 7. "Night Pool"; 8. "Summer Rain Diver" (サマーレイン・ダイバー)	46	14	JPN: 1,184	RIAJ: Gold (phy.)
Sympa	Released: January 16, 2019; Label: Ariola Japan; Formats: CD, digital download, streaming; Track listing: 1. "Sympa I" (Instrumental); 2. "Slumberland"; 3. "Flash!!!"; 4. "Sorrows"; 5. "Sympa II" (Instrumental); 6. "Hitman"; 7. "Don't Stop the Clocks"; 8. "It's a Small World"; 9. "Sympa III" (Instrumental); 10. "Prayer X"; 11. "Bedtown"; 12. "The Hole"; 13. "Sympa IV" (Instrumental)	4	4	JPN: 23,211	
Ceremony	Released: January 15, 2020; Label: Ariola Japan; Formats: CD, digital download, streaming	1	1	WW: 1,000,000; JPN: 500,000; JPN: 87,000 (dig.)	RIAJ: 2× Platinum (phy.)
The Greatest Unknown	Released: November 29, 2023; Label: Ariola Japan; Formats: CD, digital download, streaming	1	1	JPN: 203,406	RIAJ: Platinum (phy.)
"—" denotes releases that did not chart.

=== Extended plays ===
Title	EP details
Srv. Vinci
Tokyo Chaotic (トーキョー・カオティック)	Released: September 14, 2016; Label: Perimetron; Formats: CD, digital download; Track listing: 1. "Low Love" (ロウラヴ); 2. "Summer Rain Diver" (サマーレイン・ダイバー); 3. "Vinyl"; 4. "Haretsu" (破裂)

=== Singles ===
List of singles, showing year released, selected chart positions, sales, certifications, and album name
Title	Year	Peak chart positions				Sales	Certifications	Album
Title	Year	JPN	JPN Hot	US Rock	WW	Sales	Certifications	Album
"Flash!!!"	2018	—	97	—	—		RIAJ: Gold (st.)	Sympa
"Prayer X"	2018	31	40	—	—		RIAJ: Gold (dig.); Platinum (st.)	Sympa
"Hakujitsu" (白日)	2019	—	2	—	— (Note: "Hakujitsu" did not enter the Billboard Global 200, but peaked at number 141 on the Global Excl. US.)	JPN: 411,084	RIAJ: Platinum (dig.); Diamond (st.)	Ceremony
"Hikōtei" (飛行艇)	2019	—	10	—	—		RIAJ: Gold (dig.); 2× Platinum (st.)	Ceremony
"Umbrella" (傘)	2019	—	9	—	—		RIAJ: Gold (dig.); Platinum (st.)	Ceremony
"Sanmon Shōsetsu" (三文小説)	2020	2	4	—	151		RIAJ: Gold (phy.); Gold (dig.); Platinum (st.)	The Greatest Unknown
"Senryō Yakusha" (千両役者)	2020	2	12	—	— (Note: "Senryou Yakusha" did not enter the Billboard Global 200, but peaked at number 189 on the Global Excl. US.)		RIAJ: Gold (phy.); Gold (st.)	The Greatest Unknown
"Abuku" (泡)	2021	—	18	—	— (Note: "Abuku" did not enter the Billboard Global 200, but peaked at number 111 on the Global Excl. US.)			The Greatest Unknown
"Boy"	2021	4	9	—	164	JPN: 27,261	RIAJ: Platinum (st.)	The Greatest Unknown
"Ichizu" (一途)	2021	1	1	—	78	JPN: 81,869	RIAJ: Gold (phy.); Platinum (dig.); 3× Platinum (st.)	The Greatest Unknown
"Sakayume" (逆夢)	2021	1	2	—	90	JPN: 81,869	RIAJ: Gold (phy.); Platinum (dig.); 3× Platinum (st.)	The Greatest Unknown
"Chameleon" (カメレオン)	2022	2	1	—	63	JPN: 28,041	RIAJ: Gold (dig.); 3× Platinum (st.)	The Greatest Unknown
"Ame Sansan" (雨燦々)	2022	—	8	—	— (Note: "Ame Sansan" did not enter the Billboard Global 200, but peaked at number 72 on the Global Excl. US.)		RIAJ: Gold (dig.); Platinum (st.)	The Greatest Unknown
"Stardom"	2022	5	5	—	— (Note: "Stardom" did not enter the Billboard Global 200, but peaked at number 111 on the Global Excl. US.)	JPN: 27,136	RIAJ: Gold (st.)	The Greatest Unknown
"Specialz"	2023	4	2	—	28	JPN: 32,085	RIAJ: Gold (dig.); 3× Platinum (st.); RIAA: Gold	The Greatest Unknown
"Mascara"	2024	—	29	—	—			TBA
"Nekko" (ねっこ)	2024	—	7	—	—	JPN: 12,706 (dig.)	RIAJ: Platinum (st.)	TBA
"Twilight!!!"	2025	—	4	—	183		RIAJ: Platinum (st.)	TBA
"So Bad"	2025	—	14	—	—			TBA
"Aizo"	2026	2	1	40	30	JPN: 64,784	RIAJ: Gold (phy.); Platinum (st.)	TBA
"Go Ghost"	2026	—	9	—	—			TBA
"—" denotes releases that did not chart or were not released in that region.

==== Promotional singles ====
List of promotional singles, showing year released, select chart positions, certifications, and album name
Title	Year	Peak chart positions		Certifications	Album
Title	Year	JPN Hot	WW Excl. US	Certifications	Album
"Tokyo Rendez-Vous"	2017	—	—		Tokyo Rendez-Vous
"McDonald Romance"	2017	—	—		Tokyo Rendez-Vous
"Vinyl"	2017	90	—	RIAJ: Platinum (st.)	Tokyo Rendez-Vous
"Slumberland"	2018	53	—	RIAJ: Gold (st.)	Sympa
"Teenager Forever"	2019	5	—	RIAJ: Gold (dig.); 2× Platinum (st.)	Ceremony
"Glass Window" (硝子窓)	2023	16	161	RIAJ: Gold (st.)	The Greatest Unknown
"—" denotes releases that did not chart or were not released in that territory.

=== Other charted and certified songs ===
List of songs not released as singles, showing year released, selected chart positions, certifications, and album name
Title	Year	Peak chart positions	Certifications	Album
Title	Year	JPN Hot	Certifications	Album
"Sorrows"	2019	—	RIAJ: Gold (st.)	Sympa
"It's a Small World"	2019	—	RIAJ: Gold (st.)	Sympa
"The Hole"	2019	57	RIAJ: Gold (st.)	Sympa
"Kazari Janai no yo Namida wa" (飾りじゃないのよ涙は)	2019	31		Yōsui Inoue Tribute
"Opening Ceremony" (開会式)	2020	81		Ceremony
"Doron" (どろん)	2020	6	RIAJ: Platinum (st.)	Ceremony
"Humor" (ユーモア)	2020	26	RIAJ: Gold (st.)	Ceremony
"Makuai" (幕間)	2020	77		Ceremony
"Small Planet" (小さな惑星)	2020	25	RIAJ: Gold (st.)	Ceremony
"Overflow"	2020	41		Ceremony
"Danjo" (壇上)	2020	66		Ceremony
"F.O.O.L"	2021	76		Boy
"Asura" ():阿修羅:	2023	42		The Greatest Unknown
"—" denotes releases that did not chart.

== Kōhaku Uta Gassen appearances ==
Year	No.	Song	Notes
2019	70th	"Hakujitsu"	
2022	73rd	"Stardom"	

== Awards and nominations ==
Year	Award ceremony	Category	Nominee / Work	Result	Ref.
2019	MTV Video Music Awards Japan	Best Video of the Year	"Hakujitsu"	Won	
2019	MTV Video Music Awards Japan	Best New Artist Video	"Hakujitsu"	Won	
2019	61st Japan Record Awards	Excellence Album Award	Sympa	Won	
2019	MTV Europe Music Awards	Best Japanese Act	King Gnu	Won	
2019	Mnet Asian Music Awards	Best New Asian Artist – Japan	King Gnu	Won	
2022	MTV Video Music Awards Japan	Best Art Direction Video	"Sakayume"	Won	
2024	Berlin Music Video Awards	Best Editor	"Specialz"	Nominated	
2025	Music Awards Japan	Best J-Rock Artist	King Gnu	Won	
2025	Music Awards Japan	Best J-Rock Song	"Specialz"	Won	
2025	Music Awards Japan	Best Japanese Song in Europe	"Specialz"	Nominated	
2025	Music Awards Japan	Best Japanese Song in North America	"Specialz"	Nominated	
2025	Music Awards Japan	Best Japanese Song in Latin America	"Specialz"	Nominated	
2025	Music Awards Japan	Best of Listeners' Choice: Japanese Song	"Specialz"	Nominated	
2025	Music Awards Japan	Best of Listeners' Choice: Japanese Song	"Nekko"	Nominated	
2026	Music Awards Japan	Top Japanese Song in Asia	"Aizo"	Nominated	
2026	Music Awards Japan	Top Japanese Song in Europe	"Aizo"	Nominated	
2026	Music Awards Japan	Top Japanese Song in North America	"Aizo"	Nominated	
