= Hakujitsu =

2019 single by King Gnu

Single by King Gnu

from the album Ceremony
- Language: Japanese
- Released: February 22, 2019
- Genre: J-pop; alternative rock
- Length: 4:34
- Label: Ariola Japan
- Songwriter: Daiki Tsuneta
- Producer: King Gnu

King Gnu singles chronology
"Prayer X" (2018)	"Hakujitsu" (2019)	"Hikōtei" (2019)

Music video
- "Hakujitsu" on YouTube

"Hakujitsu" (Japanese: 白日; lit. "sun" or "daytime") is a song by Japanese band King Gnu. It was released as a digital single on February 22, 2019, by Ariola Japan, as the theme song for the Nippon TV drama Innocence: False Accusation Lawyer.

== Background and release ==
The song was written as the theme song for the Nippon TV drama Innocence: False Accusation Lawyer, starring Kentaro Sakaguchi, at the request of the drama's producer, Tetsuhiro Ogino. He requested a song that reflected the prayers of the main character for his clients to move forward towards the future, as even though clients are innocent and acquitted, they are exposed to harsh public scrutiny.

On January 7, 2019, it was announced that King Gnu would be performing the theme song for the drama. As the drama aired in January, Tsuneta spent his New Year's holiday alone, composing the song; recording with the band members was conducted around January 9. Though Tsuneta would typically send a demo recording to the other members, who would modify it, due to the imminent deadline, King Gnu worked on the song in the recording studio across four days. "Hakujitsu" was digitally released on February 22, 2019, by Ariola Japan.

== Composition and lyrics ==
Tsuneta, the songwriter, described "Hakujitsu" as dark and emotional, based on him working alone in his room during the New Year's holidays. Additionally, he said that the death of his two friends made him conscious of life and death, influencing his songwriting.

== Music video ==
The music video for "Hakujitsu", directed by Perimetron's Osrin, was released on February 28, 2019. It was filmed at Helena International Hotel in Iwaki, Fukushima, an unfinished hotel built during the Japanese asset price bubble. Consistently monochrome throughout, with the exception of the title in the opening, the credits at the end, and the Perimetron logo, the music video consists entirely of clips of King Gnu performing. On the simplicity of the music video, Osrin said that it "relied on the power of the subject" and "turned out to be a work of art".

=== Reception ===
The video won Best Video of the Year and Best New Artist Video (Japan) at the 2019 MTV Video Music Awards Japan held on September 18, 2019. It exceeded 100 million views on December 11, approximately nine and a half months after the video's release.

== Charts ==
=== Weekly charts ===
Chart (2019–2024)	Peak position
Global Excl. US (Billboard)	141
Japan (Japan Hot 100)	2
Japan Combined Singles (Oricon)	2

=== Year-end charts ===
Chart (2019)	Position
Japan (Japan Hot 100)	4
Japan Combined Singles (Oricon)	20
Tokyo (Tokio Hot 100)	10

Chart (2020)	Position
Japan (Japan Hot 100)	5
Japan Digital Singles (Oricon)	6
Japan Streaming (Oricon)	4

Chart (2021)	Position
Japan (Japan Hot 100)	31

Chart (2022)	Position
Japan (Japan Hot 100)	62

Chart (2023)	Position
Japan (Japan Hot 100)	80

Chart (2024)	Position
Japan (Japan Hot 100)	78

=== All-time charts ===
Chart (2008–2022)	Position
Japan (Japan Hot 100)	8

== Certifications ==
Region	Certification	Certified units/sales
Japan (RIAJ)	Million	1,000,000^{*}
Streaming
Japan (RIAJ)	Diamond	500,000,000^{†}
^{*} Sales figures based on certification alone.^{†} Streaming-only figures based on certification alone.
