= Ichizu/Sakayume =

- Standard and first press limited editions cover, featuring Rika Orimoto

Single by King Gnu

from the album The Greatest Unknown
- Language: Japanese
- Released: December 29, 2021
- Recorded: 2021
- Studio: Bunkamura (Shibuya, Tokyo, Japan)
- Genre: J-pop; anime song
- Length: 3:11
- Label: Ariola Japan
- Songwriter: Daiki Tsuneta

King Gnu singles chronology
"Boy" (2021)	"Ichizu/Sakayume" (2021)	"Chameleon" (2022)

Music videos
- Ichizu on YouTube
- Sakayume on YouTube

Alternative cover
- Limited edition cover, featuring Yuta Okkotsu

"Ichizu" / "Sakayume" (一途/逆夢; lit. 'The Only Way' / 'Contradictory Dream'), is a Japanese double A-side single by King Gnu. It was released on December 29, 2021, by Sony Music Labels (Ariola Japan). Both songs served as theme songs for the 2021 MAPPA film Jujutsu Kaisen 0, with "Ichizu" serving as the opening theme and "Sakayume" as the ending theme. They were performed by King Gnu, who aimed the theme songs to focus on the chaotic relationship between the leads, Yuta Okkotsu and Rika Orimoto, with "Ichizu" having a strong starting point and "Sakayume" being more melancholic.

While the songs were released together, a Blu-ray video was also released featuring more singles from the band. They have appeared in several charts from Billboard Japan. Critical response was also favorable due to how both themes capture Yuta and Rika's tragic relationship, with "Ichizu" standing out due to its speed.

== Background ==
In November 2021, Toho revealed that King Gnu would be providing the theme "Ichizu" (一途, lit. 'The Only Way') to the then-upcoming MAPPA anime film Jujutsu Kaisen 0 in December. An instrumental version would be released separately. Director Taichi Kimura explained the combined rock elements into a "sophisticated world." The song was released fully on December 1, 2021, at the 2021 FNS Song Festival 1st Night. It was pre-revealed on December 10, 2021, and the music video premiered on the same day. It was King Gnu's first music video in which the director, known as Perimetron, was not involved in the production.

In late December before the film's premiere, the staff revealed that King Gnu would also provide the ending theme "Sakayume (逆夢, lit. 'Contradictory Dream'). The two songs were released together in a CD featuring an artwork of the character Yuta Okkotsu. An alternate Blu-ray containing several more tracks from the same band was also released on December 29, 2021, instead featuring an artwork of Rika Orimoto, a cursed skeleton that follows Yuta. There were three versions of the single released; a regular version; a first press limited version; and a limited edition, which contained footage from a performance held in November of the previous year.

== Overview ==
"Ichizu" places focus on the relationship between the Jujutsu Kaisen 0 protagonists Yuta and Rika. Vocalist and guitarist Daiki Tsuneta wrote "Ichizu". There was pressure to make the "ideal masterpiece" that the audience have been waiting for. However, they found it fitting for the franchise. The artists added there a fast sense of gale and rage colored with chorus and harmony which carries the main tune that returns to the first rugged melody. It goes back to the strong impression of being stoic. The music video was made by Taichi Kimura, who aimed to fuse the rugged nature of rock with a sophisticated world.

"Sakayume" was digitally released as a surprise on December 24, 2021. According to King Gnu, it conveys a sad voice and a gentle and rocky melody as seen in its refrain a calm background music. While the focus of the themes is that of Yuta and Rika's relationship, Human Tokyo also commented that there seems to be a commentary on the characters of Satoru Gojo and Suguru Geto. Just like Yuta and Rika, this duo originally had a stable relationship, but a tragedy explored in flashbacks led to their downfall. As a result, the website claimed that "Sakayume" is the opposite of dreams people tend to have. The music video was directed by the artist "Perimetron's Osrin", who wanted to give the audience a different perspective from the same band. It was released on January 5, 2022.

Eriko Ishii mentioned that the single package "is a high-speed rock tune with a lot of words and the other is a moist ballad". He pointed out and reaffirmed King Gnu's appeal of "coexistence of avant-garde and classic, aristocratic elegance and enthusiasm on the verge of riot." Music writer Tsutomu Matsumoto describes it as "a love song that is so fiercely straight and can no longer be considered catastrophic, even if you look back on the long history of J-pop."

== Track listing ==
All lyrics/music by Daiki Tsuneta, all arrangements by King Gnu.

CD-DA
No.	Title	Length
1.	"Ichizu (一途)" (anime film Jujutsu Kaisen 0 opening theme song)	3:10
2.	"Sakayume (逆夢)" (anime film Jujutsu Kaisen 0 ending theme song)	5:07
Total length:		8:18

First press limited edition – disc 2 Blu-ray King Gnu Live Tour 2020 AW "Ceremony" November 25, 2020, at Nippon Budokan
No.	Title	Length
1.	"Kaikaishiki (開会式; lit. 'Opening Ceremony')"	2:37
2.	"Doron (どろん; lit. 'Vanishing')"	3:05
3.	"Sorrows"	3:41
4.	"Vinyl"	5:43
5.	"It's a small world"	4:01
6.	"Hakujitsu (白日; lit. 'Bright Sunshine')"	4:48
7.	"Hikōtei (飛行艇; lit. 'Flying Boat')"	4:38
8.	"Overflow"	4:02
9.	"Slumberland"	3:29
10.	"Hitman"	5:40
11.	"The hole"	5:23
12.	"Yumoa (ユーモア; lit. 'Humor')"	3:37
13.	"Kasa (傘; lit. 'Umbrella')"	3:38
14.	"Tokyo Rendez-Vous"	8:30
15.	"Haretsu (破裂; lit. 'Explosion')"	2:27
16.	"Prayer X"	3:01
17.	"Rōrabu (ロウラブ; lit. 'Low Love')"	3:26
18.	"Flash!!!"	6:04
19.	"Heikaishiki (閉会式; lit. 'Closing Ceremony')" (encore)	1:30
20.	"Sanmon Shosetsu (三文小説; lit. 'Dime Novel')" (encore)	4:43
21.	"Teenager Forever" (encore)	5:26
Total length:		97:46

== Live performances ==
Date	Program name	Broadcaster	Performance song	source
December 1, 2021	2021 FNS Song Festival 1st Night	Fuji TV	Ichizu	
December 20, 2021	CDTV Live! Live! Christmas 4 Hours Special	TBS	Ichizu	
December 24, 2021	Music Station Super Live 2021	TV Asahi	Sakayume	
March 20, 2022	Love music	Fuji TV	Ichizu	
March 20, 2022	Love music	Fuji TV	Sakayume	

== Critical response ==
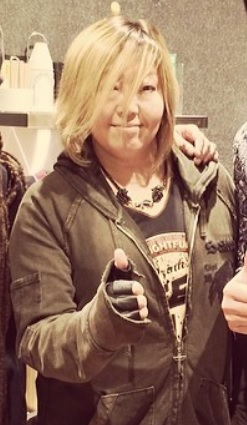
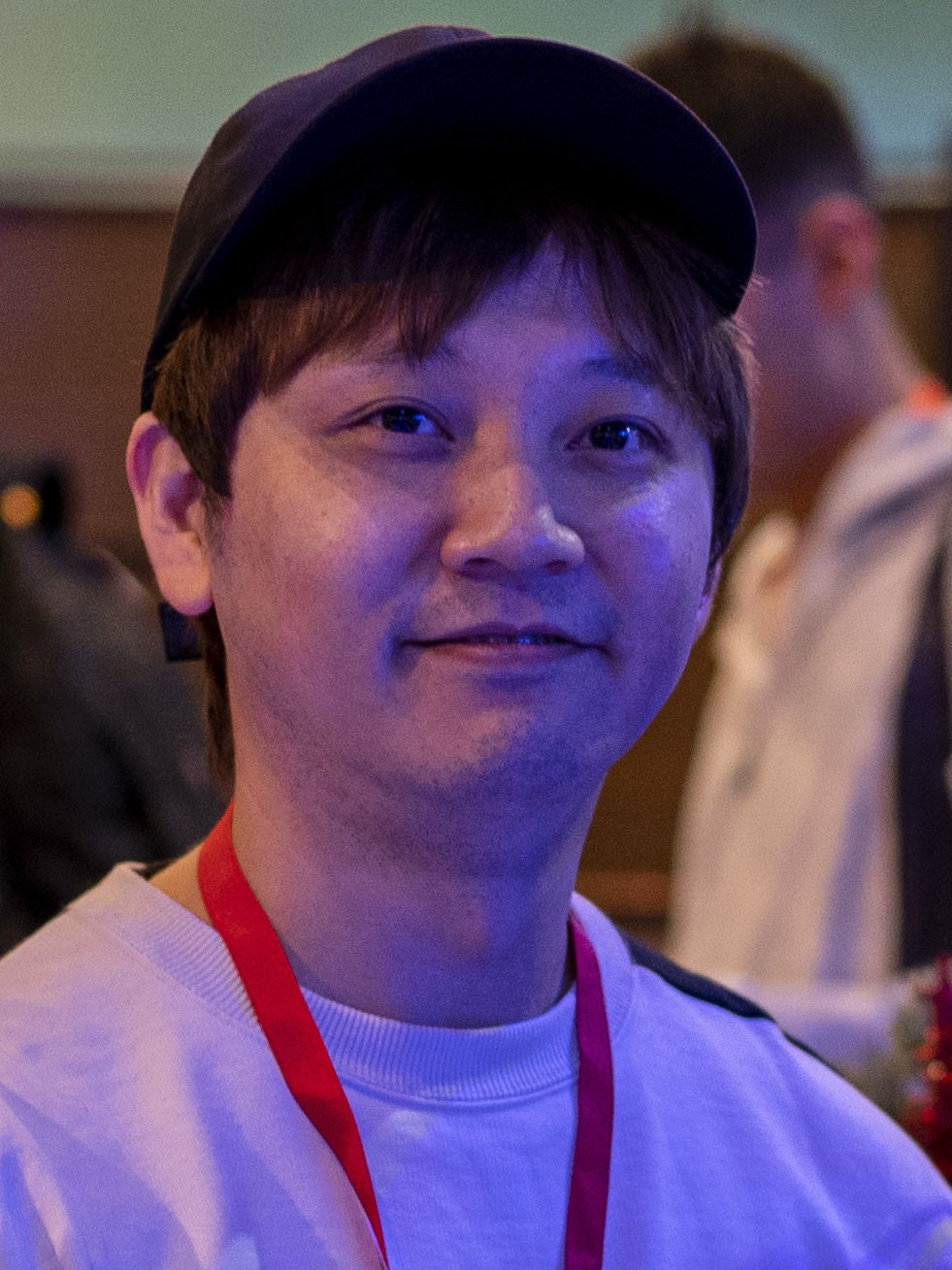
Megumi Ogata (left) and Yu Hayashi have performed covers of "Sakayume"

Rocking On stated that "Sakayume" does a good job at explaining Yuta and Rika's chaotic relationship based on certain lyrics that focus on the former's predicament regarding his love for the latter. GameScored agreed, citing "Ichizu" as one of the most standing musical themes in the Jujutsu Kaisen series in general. GamerFocus and Cinepremiere found both themes remarkable. Yuta's Japanese voice actress Megumi Ogata praised both themes, and made a cover of "Sakayume" for the 30th CD soundtrack based on her entire career. Another compilation named CrossSing collected "Sakayume" on September 21, 2022, with the cover made by Hayashi Yuu.

== Commercial performance ==
"Ichizu", which was pre-delivered on December 10, 2021, was downloaded 29,545 times on the Billboard Japan Songs Chart, released on December 15. It reached 2nd place and recorded 22nd place in streaming with 4,163,066 playbacks. In other indicators, "Ichizu" made its debut in 4th place overall, reaching 10th place for video playback, 18th place for Twitter, and 29th place for radio. In the chart for the following week, it had risen from 4th to 3rd overall, with 3rd for download, 4th for streaming, and 2nd for video playback and radio.

"Sakayume", which was pre-delivered on December 24 when the movie was released, is the top download on the chart released on December 29, 2021, with 28,308 downloads. It also recorded 45th place in streaming and debuted in 12th place overall. In the chart of the week following the release of the physical CD, "Ichizu" sold 47,292 copies and became the No. 1 single, No. 1 in streaming with 9,696,001 playbacks, and No. 1 in video playback with 2,098,622 playbacks, winning a total of three No. 1s. It was the first from the band (as of January 2022) to take the overall lead. The next week, "Sakayume" moved up from 12th place to 3rd place overall, which was driven by No. 1 in downloads, marking 24,637 downloads. The following week, "Sakayume", which was released on January 5 as a MV, ranked first in downloads for three weeks in a row and second in streaming overall. "Ichizu" also achieved a one-two finish with 3rd place for download and 1st place for streaming. "Sakayume" won No. 1 in streaming with 10,032,427 streams on the chart the following week, and King Gnu achieved a streaming one-two finish again with the 1st and 2nd places swapping. On March 16, 2022, "Ichizu" surpassed 100 million total streaming views.

== Certifications ==
	Certification (RIAJ)	Sales/views
Ichizu
Download	Platinum	159,000 DL
Streaming	3× Platinum	300,000,000
Sakayume
Download	Platinum	138,000DL
Streaming	3× Platinum	300,000,000
*Sales / views based on certification only
