= Jujutsu Kaisen 0 (film) =

2021 film directed by Sunghoo Park

- Theatrical release poster

Japanese name
- Kanji: 劇場版 呪術廻戦 0
Transcriptions
- Revised Hepburn: Gekijōban Jujutsu Kaisen Zero
- Directed by: Sunghoo Park
- Screenplay by: Hiroshi Seko
- Based on: Jujutsu Kaisen 0 by Gege Akutami
- Produced by: Masaya Saito; Yuri Murai; Toshihiro Maeda
- Starring: Megumi Ogata; Kana Hanazawa; Mikako Komatsu; Koki Uchiyama; Tomokazu Seki; Yuichi Nakamura; Takahiro Sakurai
- Cinematography: Teppei Ito
- Edited by: Keisuke Yanagi
- Music by: Hiroaki Tsutsumi; Yoshimasa Terui; Alisa Okehazama
- Production company: MAPPA
- Distributed by: Toho
- Release date: December 24, 2021
- Running time: 105 minutes
- Country: Japan
- Language: Japanese
- Box office: $191.1 million

Jujutsu Kaisen 0 (Japanese: 劇場版 呪術廻戦 0, Hepburn: Gekijō-ban Jujutsu Kaisen Zero; 'Jujutsu Kaisen 0: The Movie') is a 2021 Japanese animated dark fantasy film. It is based on the 2017 manga Jujutsu Kaisen 0, which is itself a prologue to the manga series Jujutsu Kaisen, both manga having been written by Gege Akutami. It was directed by Sunghoo Park from a screenplay by Hiroshi Seko, and stars Megumi Ogata, Kana Hanazawa, Mikako Komatsu, Kōki Uchiyama, Tomokazu Seki, Yuichi Nakamura, and Takahiro Sakurai. The film follows Yuta Okkotsu, a young student who becomes a sorcerer and seeks to control the Cursed Spirit of his childhood friend Rika Orimoto in Jujutsu High, alongside other skilled sorcerers in training.

Originally intended as an arc of the animated television series Jujutsu Kaisen, studio MAPPA changed the format of it during discussion. The staff decided to expand the narrative from that of the original manga by adding new scenes focused on Yuta's mentor Satoru Gojo and the antagonist Suguru Geto. King Gnu performed the two theme songs. Given the large budget for the movie, MAPPA aimed to make more appealing fight sequences than the ones from the animated television series.

Jujutsu Kaisen 0 was released in Japan on December 24, 2021, by Toho. Upon its release, the film received positive reviews for its accessible storytelling, animated fight sequences, and soundtrack. However, it received criticism for its short length, as some characters felt underdeveloped compared to the lead. It was the highest-grossing film at the Japanese box office in 2021.

== Plot ==
High school student Yuta Okkotsu is frequently bullied, but one day his bullies are brutally killed by a Cursed Spirit that clings to him. The higher-ups of the Jujutsu Society wish to have the boy killed, as his curse is a dangerous spirit. However, a teacher at Tokyo Jujutsu Technical High, Satoru Gojo, recruits Yuta to join the school in November 2016, thus saving him. Yuta explains that the Cursed Spirit is Rika, a childhood friend whom he had promised to marry when they grew up. Rika died in a freak accident and became an overprotective spirit that harms anyone who threatens him. Yuta meets fellow students Maki Zen'in, Toge Inumaki, and Panda, all with distinct abilities of their own.

During his first mission with Maki, Yuta successfully summons Rika on his own for the first time to save them from a Cursed Spirit. Three months pass in his school training, and he grows close to Maki, Toge, and Panda. One day, on a mission together, Toge and Yuta are attacked by a high-level Curse. The man behind the attack was Suguru Geto, a previous student and old friend of Gojo, who defected from the school and killed over a hundred innocent people on a mission.

Geto attempts to get Yuta on his side so they can make use of Rika, but Yuta refuses when he insults Yuta's friends due to unsettled circumstances. Geto declares war to activate a portal to the under-world: he will release a thousand Curses upon the city to remove non-sorcerer humans, as he believes them to be undeserving and beneath sorcerers. Geto's real reason for the war, however, is to distract Gojo so he can kill Yuta and add Rika to his collection of cursed spirits. Gojo realizes this upon learning of Yuta's background, and sends Inumaki and Panda back to the school to protect Yuta and Maki during the night of Geto's attack. Geto overpowers them all, leaving only Yuta conscious. Enraged at seeing his friends hurt, Yuta promises himself as a sacrifice to Rika in order to strengthen their bond. As a result, Geto is severely wounded. He is found by Gojo, who after reflecting on their past friendship, executes him.

Gojo confirms that Yuta was the one who inadvertently cursed Rika through un-specified ties to royal bloodlines within the hierarchy of Japan's caste system, rather than the other way around, by being unable to accept her death. Yuta broke the curse after promising himself to Rika, and she is able to pass on peacefully after Yuta continues training as a sorcerer within the institution.

In a post-credits scene, Geto's former ally Miguel eats lunch with Yuta in Kenya, and Gojo comes to join them.

== Voice cast ==
Character	Japanese	English
Yuta Okkotsu (乙骨 憂太, Okkotsu Yūta)	Megumi Ogata	Kayleigh McKee
Rika Orimoto (折本 里香, Orimoto Rika)	Kana Hanazawa	Anairis Quiñones
Maki Zen'in (禪院 真希, Zen'in Maki)	Mikako Komatsu	Allegra Clark
Toge Inumaki (狗巻 棘, Inumaki Toge)	Koki Uchiyama	Xander Mobus
Panda (パンダ)	Tomokazu Seki	Matthew David Rudd
Satoru Gojo (五条 悟, Gojō Satoru)	Yuichi Nakamura	Kaiji Tang
Suguru Geto (夏油 傑, Getō Suguru)	Takahiro Sakurai	Lex Lang
Kiyotaka Ijichi (伊地知 潔高, Ijichi Kiyotaka)	Mitsuo Iwata	Chris Tergliafera
Miguel (ミゲル, Migeru)	Koichi Yamadera	Bill Butts
Nanako Hasaba (枷場 菜々子, Hasaba Nanako)	Satsumi Matsuda	Ryan Bartley
Mimiko Hasaba (枷場 美々子, Hasaba Mimiko)	Risae Matsuda	Sarah Anne Williams
Larue (ラルゥ, Rarū)	Show Hayami	
Manami Suda (菅田 真奈美, Suda Manami)	Shizuka Itō	Laura Post
Mei Mei (冥冥)	Kotono Mitsuishi	Amber Lee Connors
Masamichi Yaga (夜蛾 正道, Yaga Masamichi)	Takaya Kuroda	Keith Silverstein
Kento Nanami (七海 建人, Nanami Kento)	Kenjiro Tsuda	David Vincent
Akari Nitta (新田明, Nitta Akari)	Sora Tokui	Sarah Anne Williams
Shoko Ieiri (家入 硝子, Ieiri Shoko)	Aya Endō	Ryan Bartley
Aoi Todo (東堂 葵, Tōdō Aoi)	Subaru Kimura	Xander Mobus
Mai Zen'in (禪院 真依, Zen'in Mai)	Marina Inoue	Laura Post
Kasumi Miwa (三輪 霞, Miwa Kasumi)	Chinatsu Akasaki	Allegra Clark
Momo Nishimiya (西宮 桃, Nishimiya Momo)	Rie Kugimiya	Tara Sands
Noritoshi Kamo (加茂 憲紀, Kamo Noritoshi)	Satoshi Hino	Landon McDonald
Kokichi Muta (与 幸吉, Muta Kōkichi) / Mechamaru	Yoshitsugu Matsuoka	Keith Silverstein
Takuma Ino (猪野琢真, Ino Takuma)	Yū Hayashi	Lucien Dodge
Atsuya Kusakabe (日下部 篤也, Kusakabe Atsuya)	Shin-ichiro Miki	

== Production ==
Jujutsu Kaisen 0 is a prequel to the Jujutsu Kaisen television anime produced by studio MAPPA and based on the manga series Jujutsu Kaisen 0 by Gege Akutami. Sunghoo Park initially intended to adapt the protagonist Yuta Okkotsu from the first few episodes of the television series. However, the idea was discarded and the anime instead began with Yuji Itadori's introduction to the world of sorcerers and curses, similarly based on the Jujutsu Kaisen manga. In the original format, Park would have adapted the series' first three episodes to develop Yuji and then replaced him with Okkotsu, but that idea was discarded. Park later felt that telling the Jujutsu Kaisen prequel would suit the film format better than a television series. Seko commented that, for the film to fill two hours, he would need to add new material, such as Okkotsu's past and the relationship between Gojo and Geto. Seko said that the action scenes of Akutami's manga were the most important part of the series and that he wanted to focus on them in the film. Park agreed and added elements of Chinese films to the movie, which he wanted fans to look forward to.

With the eventual remake as a film, MAPPA produced the film with director Sunghoo Park and writer Hiroshi Seko returning from the television series to work on it. Character designs were handled by Tadashi Hiramatsu. The film was announced after the Jujutsu Kaisen anime television series finale in March 2021. While the television series was noted for having entertaining fight scenes, the team wanted to improve them. While not too different from the television series, Park aimed to give the film its own style, such as the background colors when the sky is shown. Park noted that there were multiple challenges in making the animated film, compared with his experience with live-action works, due to the amount of animation needed.

Park said that the film would include new content not featured in the original Jujutsu Kaisen 0 manga. This was mainly because the film was based on a single manga volume, and the team aimed to make a feature-length work rather than a thirty-minute piece. MAPPA CEO Manabu Otsuka said that the team was impressed by the original Jujutsu Kaisen 0 and believed that fans would like to see it adapted. Seko said that he had to alter parts from the original series to make Yuta's character arc more notable. The post-credits scene of the film is an original scene not present in the manga. Toho had doubts about creating such content until they contacted Akutami, who gave them the idea.

Park wanted to be careful to give each character an appropriate facial expression when fighting. He considered the new protagonist, Yuta Okkotsu, to be a representative teenager possessed by loneliness, in this case caused by being beset by Rika's curse. Because Jujutsu Kaisen 0 was a film, Park aimed to give it an appropriate environment, most notably Jujutsu High, where Yuta begins exorcising demons with his teammates. Several animators were not accustomed to drawing pictures in a cinemascope frame, but they were still able to draw wider scenery and backgrounds and felt satisfied that they had created the world of the franchise for the audience.

The inclusion of Gojo was intended to be seen as natural by the staff, especially focusing on his relationship with Geto, which is also explored in the television series. However, Park claimed that the staff did not want to give such characters too much screen time, because the narrative primarily focuses on Yuta and Rika. Another addition to the film, not present in the original work, was the four consecutive Black Flashes that Nanami mentioned in an interview in the television series. Seko was requested by the director to feature a new fight scene between Gojo and Miguel in the climax. Seko said that the team expanded Yuta and Geto's final fight by adding a scene in which the latter vomits blood.

=== Japanese casting ===
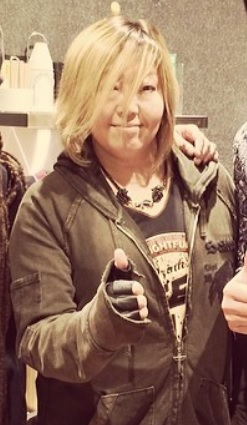
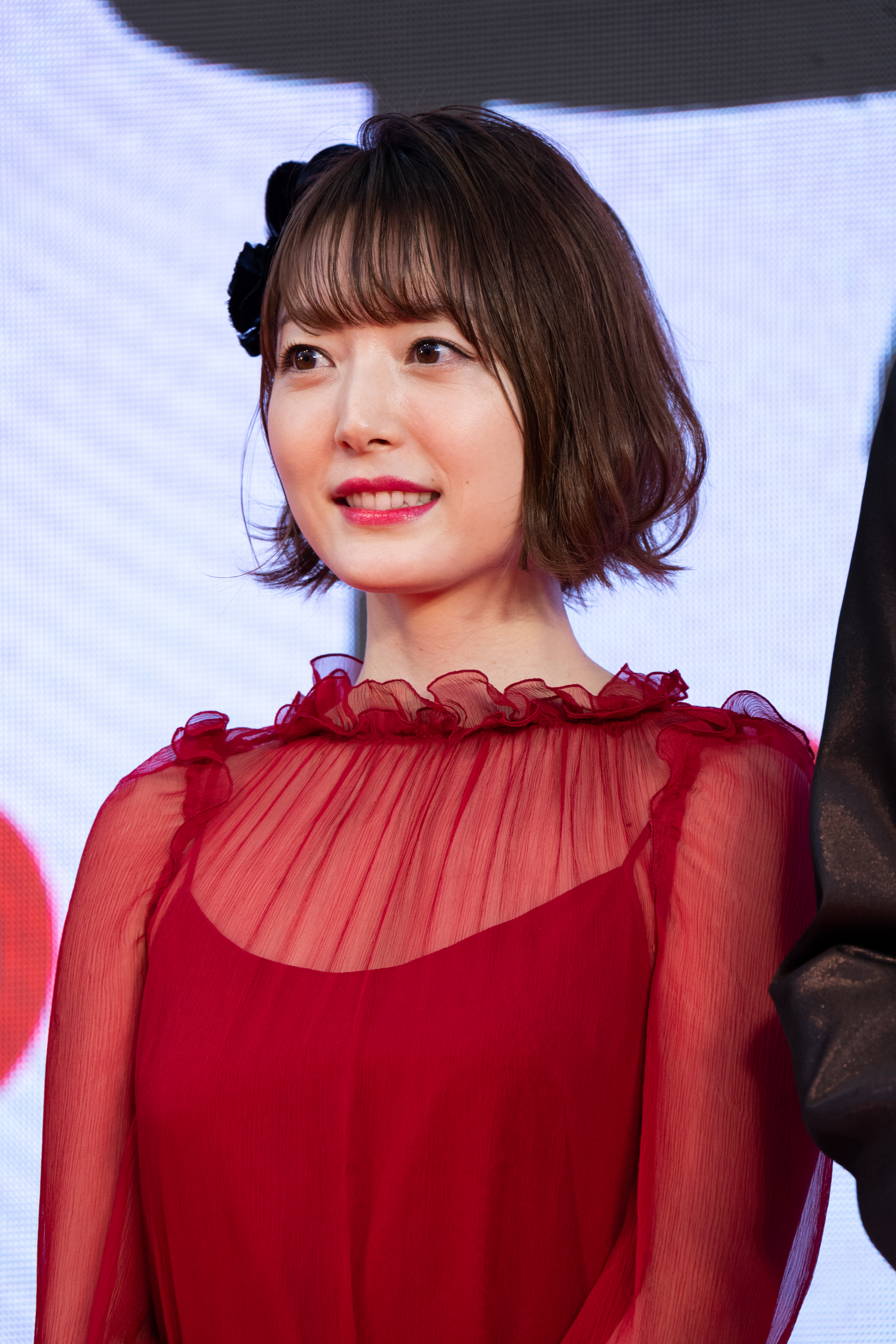
Megumi Ogata (left) and Kana Hanazawa (right) voice Yuta and Rika respectively.
- When casting Megumi Ogata, Gege Akutami envisioned the character as "neutral, soft, and kind, and there is also a big emotional swing and head." Ogata's name was mentioned as an example of an actor close to that description, and in response, director Sunghoo Park and the anime staff unanimously decided to cast her. Ogata said that she would like to cherish the original image as well as create her own image of Yuta. Ogata described him as an attractive character due to how strong he becomes when interacting with others. Sunghoo Park was also behind the casting of Yuta's voice actor, although Yuta was now a young male voiced by a woman. Ogata surprised Park during the making of the film by giving Yuta a sensitive characterization in crying.
- Kana Hanazawa was cast to voice Rika. She wanted to audition because she was a fan of the original anime and television series. The story of Rika's childhood left a major impression on Hanazawa, who looked forward to interacting with Ogata. Hanazawa expressed Rika's love for Yuta with enthusiasm, and Ogata praised Hanazawa's work.
- Mikako Komatsu was cast to voice Maki Zen'in. Komatsu noted that certain scenes involving Yuta's romance were too erotic for the film, while Ogata found the early Yuta to be slapstick. Her character design was noted to be different from the one previously seen in other Jujutsu Kaisen works. Komatsu enjoyed her more comical take as Maki, who often argues with Panda and other students, as the character is a year younger than in the television series. She noted an early scene in the film in which Maki and Yuta interact in a way that helps to develop the former's characterization and past, as Maki's backstory is given.
- Koichi Yamadera voiced Miguel, a Curse master who supports Geto.
- Tomokazu Seki, another veteran voice actor, played the role of Panda. Despite feeling pressure about his work, Seki was glad to work on the film. Seki had little to no understanding of his character, due to how comical and simple he is shown in contrast to the more elaborate characterizations from the rest of the cast. Park told Seki that he was like a father to the film, but Seki still did not understand Panda, even when interacting with Nakamura, to the point that he wished Gege Akutami had explored the character more. Nevertheless, Seki claimed that he was good at the fighting scenes, which would surprise the audience.
- Kōki Uchiyama voiced Toge Inumaki. He did not see a major difference between his character and other classmates. He saw their interactions with newcomer Yuta Okkotsu as the main attraction of the film. Inumaki's lines are limited because he uses keywords relating to food to interact. Uchiyama gave subtle nuances to most of his lines and said that he tried to place emphasis on the amount of emotion he could provide in order to capture Inumaki's mostly silent character.
- Yuichi Nakamura voiced the returning character Satoru Gojo. The character has different facial expressions, from the serious to the comical, and Nakamura was given latitude regarding the vocal range used. Nakamura reiterated at the recording site that he enjoyed the comedy. He did not find a change in Gojo's characterization from the main Jujutsu Kaisen series and thought Gojo's mentoring of Yuta was similar to that for the other protagonists. He enjoyed the multiple recording takes he had, as well as the many school-like relationships. He was impressed by Ogata's work as Yuta in giving the character a wide range of emotions.
- Takahiro Sakurai voiced the antagonist Suguru Geto. He was amazed by how cool the protagonists of the film are. Sakurai read the original Jujutsu Kaisen 0 before recording the film, which surprised him with a major revelation about Geto. He received lectures from the director during the recording of the film. Among multiple traits of the character, Sakurai was surprised by the friendly relationship between Geto and Gojo. Although it was the first time Geto and Yuta interacted, Sakurai had already worked with Ogata multiple times and praised her work, as he found her portrayal of Yuta to be deep.

=== Music ===
King Gnu performed the film's theme song "Ichizu" (一途; lit. 'The Only Way'), as well as the ending song "Sakayume" (逆夢; lit. 'Contradictory Dream'). "Ichizu" puts the focus on the relationship between Yuta and Rika. Vocalist, guitarist, and writer Daiki Tsuneta stated that there was pressure to make the ideal masterpiece that the audience had been waiting for, but Tsuneta thought that it was a straightforward song with a tingling punch that is perfect for the world view of Jujutsu Kaisen. "Ichizu" and "Sakayume" were released on a single CD on December 29, 2021.

The music for the film was composed by Hiroaki Tsutsumi, Yoshimasa Terui, and Alisa Okehazama. The soundtrack was released on December 22, 2021, by Toho Animation.

== Marketing ==
The film was announced in March 2021 in the credits of the final Jujutsu Kaisen episode of the first season of the television series. In June 2021, the "Juju Fes 2021" MAPPA revealed to the audience the first poster of Yuta and Rika, with Akutami himself drawing his own rendition to celebrate. In the first teaser in July, it was revealed that Yuta was being voiced by Megumi Ogata, and Kana Hanazawa's role as Rika was revealed shortly afterwards. In promoting the movie, advertisements with Gojo as a dog were made alongside SoftBank Group.

A novel adaptation by Baraddo Kitaguni, based on Hiroshi Seko's script, was published on the film's premiere date. A Jujutsu Kaisen #0.5 Tokyo Prefectural Jujutsu High School booklet was given to the film's audience members; it had a print run of 5 million copies. The booklet included an exclusive nine-page manga by Akutami, about the daily life of Okkotsu and the other first-year students, thumbnail layouts for the first chapter of the Jujutsu Kaisen 0 manga, the film's designs, a question-and-answer session with Akutami, and comments by the anime's staff and cast of the film.

== Release ==
=== Theatrical ===
Distributed by Toho, the film premiered theatrically in Japan on December 24, 2021, in 418 theaters, with some IMAX screenings. The film was screened in 4D and Dolby Cinema formats in Japan starting on February 5, 2022. The film ended its run in Japanese theaters on May 29, 2022.

Crunchyroll, in association with Funimation, acquired the rights to the film, which theatrically premiered in North America on March 18, 2022, in over 1,500 theaters. The film was distributed by Sony in the United Kingdom and had an early screening in the UK and Ireland on March 10, 2022, while the general opening in the UK was on March 18. The film premiered in Zambia in April 2022, being the first anime film to have an official theatrical release in the country.

The English dub featured returning actors for the supporting cast, with Kayleigh McKee and Anairis Quiñones joining as Yuta Okkotsu and Rika Orimoto respectively. McKee interpreted Yuta's narrative as a coming-of-age story, focusing on his struggle to control Rika while forming new friendships. For her portrayal of Rika, Quiñones studied the vocal style of the original Japanese voice actress, Kana Hanazawa. Allegra Clark noted that her character, Maki Zen'in, displayed greater vulnerability and anger in the film compared to the television series, but underwent significant development over the course of the narrative. The cast worked under the direction of the casting director to ensure the English audio remained faithful to the original Japanese performance. Matthew David Rudd, the voice of Panda, described his character's inclusion in the film as a "baller" moment. Xander Mobus, who voiced Toge Inumaki, reported difficulty in interpreting his character's thoughts, as Inumaki communicates only in limited, random words. Despite this, Clark, Rudd, and Mobus all stated that their characters received substantial development through their interactions with Yuta. Lex Lang found his character, Suguru Geto, more compelling in the film, which he attributed to its deeper exploration of Geto's idealism. Kaiji Tang noted that his character, Satoru Gojo, remained consistent with his anime portrayal, but felt the film provided greater depth to Gojo's relationship with Geto.

=== Other releases ===
The film was released on DVD and Blu-ray Disc sets in Japan on September 21, 2022. Besides the regular version, a special edition featuring interviews, live footage of the film's premiere, and a commentary track was also released. The regular DVD sold 30,000 copies during its release week, while the deluxe edition sold 28,000 copies, with both topping charts and surpassing the record sales of the 2021 film My Hero Academia: World Heroes' Mission as the best-selling anime DVD of 2022 in its first week of release. The deluxe Blu-ray edition sold 65,000 units while the regular edition sold 27,000 units during their releases weeks, which also set records in charts, overtaking the record set by the anime Girls und Panzer.

The film was also streamed on Netflix in Japan, where it was the ninth most watched work of 2023 (based on the number of weeks it was featured on a weekly top 10, according to Netflix data).

In North America, Crunchyroll released the film on Blu-ray Disc on March 21, 2023.

== Reception ==
=== Box office ===
==== Japan ====
About 15,000 people watched the film at the earliest public screenings on 58 screens at midnight on the opening day. It was originally planned to screen at midnight on only 28 screens in 14 theaters in Kyoto, Miyagi, Tokyo, Osaka, Aichi, Fukuoka, and Hokkaido. However, tickets sold out on the first day of sales, and theaters eventually expanded the number of screens showing the film. Distributor Toho projected that the film would sell over 1 million tickets on its opening day. The film debuted at #1 and earned ¥2.694 billion ($23.5 million) in its first three days. The film is the highest-earning film at the Japanese box office from 2021, surpassing Evangelion: 3.0+1.0 Thrice Upon a Time. Overall, the film has earned a total of 13.75 billion yen (about US$108.1 million) in its run in Japanese theaters; it was the eighth all-time highest-earning anime film in Japan and the 14th highest-earning film in Japanese box office history, until September 2022, when it was surpassed by One Piece Film: Red.

==== Other territories ====
The film was released in the United States and Canada on March 18, 2022, and was projected to gross $8–13 million from 2,336 theaters in its opening weekend. It opened with $5.8 million from 2,297 theatres on Friday, including $2.9 million from Thursday-night preview screenings. The film went on to an estimated $17.7 million opening weekend, finishing second behind The Batman. Men made up 61% of the audience during its opening, with those in the 18–34 age group comprising 75% of ticket sales. The ethnic breakdown of the audience showed that 32% were Hispanic and Latino Americans, 25% Caucasian, 20% Asian or other, and 17% African American. The film's per-screen average of $6,443 was the fourth highest in the first quarter of 2022, below The Batman, Uncharted and Scream.

In the United Kingdom, the film had a three-day opening weekend of £514,000 (the fourth highest that weekend) and a five-day opening (including previews) of £822,000, the second highest that week below The Batman. In France, it sold 347,583 tickets in its opening weekend, the third highest that week, below The Batman and Notre-Dame brûle.

In India, it was released to 200 screens with 50,000 advance ticket sales across India, the film surpassed Indian movie releases such as Rocketry: The Nambi Effect and Rashtra Kavach Om with first day opening sales of ₹1.8 crore (US$190,000), and had an opening weekend of ₹5.4 crore (US$580,000).

In November 2022, it was reported that the film had sold 20.51 million tickets to earn over 26.5 billion yen (about US$191.1 million) worldwide, with a worldwide box office total of US$195,870,885, making Jujutsu Kaisen 0 the sixth highest-earning anime film of all time worldwide (unadjusted for inflation), surpassed by Demon Slayer: Kimetsu no Yaiba – The Movie: Mugen Train, three Hayao Miyazaki films (Spirited Away, Howl's Moving Castle, and Ponyo) and Your Name.

=== Critical response ===
On the review aggregator website Rotten Tomatoes, 98% of 54 critics' reviews are positive. The site's consensus is "Jujutsu Kaisen 0: The Movie offers a thrilling, beautifully animated gift for fans of the anime – and a story that holds up as a standalone effort." Metacritic, which uses a weighted average, assigned the film a score of 71 out of 100, based on 8 critics, indicating "generally favorable" reviews.

The film received positive reviews from critics. The relationship between Yuta and Rika was praised for making the former more unpredictable and for the horror the latter provided, though Anime News Network noted that this dynamic ceased to be the film's main focus in later sequences. We Got This Covered interpreted the Curse as a manifestation of trauma, while Polygon viewed it as representing an inability to accept a friend's death. Anime UK News appreciated the development of Yuta's character arc and the deeper exploration of Satoru Gojo compared to the original series. Publications including Siliconera and the Los Angeles Times praised the film for its accessibility to new viewers, noting its focus on the new protagonist Yuta and supporting characters rather than the main television series cast. Anime News Network observed that the film did not deviate significantly from the narrative style of the television series. Otaku USA expressed disappointment that the prequel was adapted as a film rather than a mini-series, believing the likable cast, particularly the villain Suguru Geto, warranted more screen time to explore their backgrounds. Polygon also commended the handling of Geto's character. The nature of Geto's survival, which confused some viewers of the anime's first season, led IGN to note that the manga provides a fuller explanation for his reappearance.

MAPPA's animation was highly praised. Polygon highlighted the sequences involving Yuta and Geto as superior to the studio's work on series like The God of High School. Anime News Network enjoyed the execution of the fight choreography, a sentiment echoed by Otaku USA, which specifically cited Satoru Gojo's battles. IGN commended the striking designs and dynamic movement of the Curses. The Los Angeles Times agreed, noting the Curses' bizarre appearances and stating that while the extreme violence might disturb sensitive viewers, it would satisfy returning audiences. Yatta-Tachi described the animation as "utterly superb" and among the "best key animated action cuts in anime". The Guardian enjoyed how the animation combined with the soundtrack to create adrenaline-pumping showdowns.

The voice cast received general acclaim. Megumi Ogata's Japanese performance as Yuta was praised by Anime News Network and IGN for giving the character greater depth than in the manga, particularly the shift from a calm tone, compared to her portrayal of Shinji Ikari in Neon Genesis Evangelion, to an aggressive one during horror or action sequences. Other actors singled out for praise included Mikako Komatsu as Maki and Yūichi Nakamura as Gojo. For the English dub, The Fandom Post compared Kayleigh McKee's performance to Spike Spencer's Shinji, questioning if the similarity was intentional, while Hitc praised McKee, Ogata, and Kana Hanazawa for their portrayals of Yuta and Rika. Conversely, Pop Culture Maniacs criticized McKee's performance for making Yuta sound childish rather than traumatized. The film's soundtrack and theme songs also garnered positive responses from Anime UK News.

Despite having only watched the first episode of the Jujutsu Kaisen anime series, game designer Hideo Kojima found Jujutsu Kaisen 0 appealing enough to be worthy of its popularity and praised MAPPA's work.

=== Accolades ===
In 2022, the film won the Animage's Anime Grand Prix poll, with Yuta and Gojo taking second and third best male characters awards, behind Tengen Uzui from Demon Slayer: Kimetsu no Yaiba. It was nominated for the 45th Japan Academy Film Prize under the Animation of the Year category. It was listed as one of the best films from 2022 by HobbyConsolas, while it remained at the top in a Web Magazine article. At the Newtype Anime Awards, the film took third place in Best Picture (Film). Seko took tenth place in Best Screenplay, Park was seventh in Best Director, Tsutsumi, Terui, and Okehazama took sixth place in Best Sound, Tadashi Hiramatsu took sixth place in Best Character Design, and Yuta reached fifth place in Best Male Character. In the Manga Barcelona Awards, the film won the Best Anime Film award. In 2023, the film won three out of four categories including Best Film at the 7th Crunchyroll Anime Awards. It also won Daruma for Best Feature Film at the Japan Expo Awards.

Year	Award	Category	Recipient	Result	Ref.
2022	44th Anime Grand Prix	Best Anime	Jujutsu Kaisen 0	Won	
2022	44th Anime Grand Prix	Best Male Character	Yuta Okkotsu	2nd place	
2022	44th Anime Grand Prix	Best Male Character	Satoru Gojo	3rd place	
2022	45th Japan Academy Film Prize	Animation of the Year	Jujutsu Kaisen 0	Nominated	
2022	12th Newtype Anime Awards	Best Picture (Film)	Jujutsu Kaisen 0	3rd place	
2022	12th Newtype Anime Awards	Best Male Character	Yuta Okkotsu	5th place	
2022	12th Newtype Anime Awards	Best Director	Sunghoo Park	7th place	
2022	12th Newtype Anime Awards	Best Screenplay	Hiroshi Seko	10th place	
2022	12th Newtype Anime Awards	Best Character Design	Tadashi Hiramatsu	6th place	
2022	12th Newtype Anime Awards	Best Sound	Hiroaki Tsutsumi, Yoshimasa Terui, and Alisa Okehazama	6th place	
2022	28th Manga Barcelona Awards	Best Anime Film	Jujutsu Kaisen 0	Won	
2023	7th Crunchyroll Anime Awards	Best Film	Jujutsu Kaisen 0	Won	
2023	7th Crunchyroll Anime Awards	Best Voice Artist Performance (Castilian)	Jaime Pérez de Sevilla (Yuta Okkotsu)	Won	
2023	7th Crunchyroll Anime Awards	Best Voice Artist Performance (German)	Nicolás Artajo (Yuta Okkotsu)	Won	
2023	7th Crunchyroll Anime Awards	Best Voice Artist Performance (Portuguese)	Pedro Alcântara (Yuta Okkotsu)	Nominated	
2023	Japan Expo Awards	Daruma for Best Feature Film	Jujutsu Kaisen 0	Won	
