= 2023 in Japanese music =

The year 2023 in Japanese music.

== Debuts ==
=== Debuting groups ===
- Ave Mujica
- Billlie
- Bite a Shock
- Candy Tune
- DXTeen
- IMP.
- Kiss Kiss
- The Jet Boy Bangerz from Exile Tribe
- Le Sserafim
- MiSaMo
- NCT Tokyo
- Purple Kiss
- Secret Number

=== Debuting soloists ===
- Yuto Adachi
- Himika Akaneya
- Ayaka Fukuhara
- Kazuki Hayashi
- Rin Kurusu
- Kaori Maeda
- Mayu Mineda
- Nako Misaki
- Rei Nakashima
- Naomi Payton
- Mayu Sagara
- Shiori Tamai
- Tuki

== Returning from hiatus ==
=== Returning groups ===
- Silent Siren

== Number-ones ==
- Oricon number-one albums
- Oricon number-one singles
- Billboard Japan number-one albums
- Billboard Japan Hot 100 number-one singles

== Awards ==
- 65th Japan Record Awards
- 2023 MTV Video Music Awards Japan

== Albums released ==
=== January ===
Date	Album	Artist	Label	Ref.
4	Koe	SixTones	Sony Music	
17	Humor	Back Number	Universal Sigma	
17	12	Ryuichi Sakamoto	Milan	
17	Here Is	The Boyz	IST	
18	V	Hiroyuki Sawano	Sacra	
18	Mountain Banana	The Cro-Magnons	Ariola Japan	
18	Wings	Koda Kumi	Rhythm Zone	
18	We are Boysgroup	Boysgroup	WACK	
25	Music World	ALI	Mastersix Foundation	
25	Remember You	Ayumi Hamasaki	Avex Music Creative	
25	Specter	Suisei Hoshimachi	Cover	
25	Curtain Call	Monkey Majik	A.S.A.B	
25	Aowoikiru	Rie Takahashi	Amuse Inc.	

=== February ===
Date	Album	Artist	Label	Ref.
1	Triangle	Dish//	Sony	
1	Contrast	Uru	Sony Music Associated	
1	Parade ga Tsuzukunara	Yuki	Epic Japan	
1	Innocent	Shikao Suga	Victor	
4	That's Life	Evisbeats	Amida Studios	
8	Compact Disc	Golden Bomber	Zany Zap	
8	Noixe	Nano	Columbia	
8	Circle	Rei Yasuda	SME	
8	I Have a Dream.	DJ Ryow	Dream Team Music	
8	Valentine's Day Is Coming This Year	Miwa	Sony Records	
14	Prismverse	May'n	Digital Double	
15	Fantasia	KAT-TUN	J Storm	
15	Naked	Leo Ieiri	Victor	
15	Not Unusual	Mao Abe	Pony Canyon	
15	Chrome Arts	OnlyOneOf	Teichiku	
15	SAYUMINGLANDOLL ~Sayumi Mirai	Sayumi Michishige	Zetima	
15	Our Best Place	Shonen Knife	Good Charamel	
15	This One's for You	Miku Itō	Nippon Columbia	
17	After the Chaos	Yaffle	Deutsche Grammophon	
22	Dialoque+2	Dialogue+	Pony Canyon	
22	Restart	Gadoro	Four Mud Arrows	
22	Judgement Day	Lovebites	Victor	
22	Mamequest	Mameshiba no Taigun	Avex Trax	
22	Round & Round	The Rampage from Exile Tribe	Rhythm Zone	
22	The Sound	Stray Kids	Epic Japan	
22	Voy✩✩✩	Flow	Sacra Music	
22	Tenki Seirou Naredomo Nami Takashi	Ali Project	Tokuma Japan Communications	
24	Start Again EP	Crystal Kay	Virgin	
24	Seasons Selection 〜Spring〜	Kobukuro	Warner Music Japan	

=== March ===
Date	Album	Artist	Label	Ref.
1	So Far So Good	Elione	Solid Sky	
1	Mie to 未唯mie: 1981–2023 All Time Best	Mie	Victor	
1	Sagas	Valshe	Being	
1	1988	Rockon Social Club	Tokyo Records	
1	The Day The World Looks Different	Miyuki Nakajima	Yamaha Music Communications	
1	Tank-top Flower for Friends	Yabai T-Shirts Yasan	Universal Sigma	
1	Between Dread and Valor	Galneryus	Warner Music Japan	
8	NMB13	NMB48	Universal Sigma	
8	Human	Reona	Sacra Music	
8	Crazy For You	KAF	Kamitsubaki Studio	
8	Come The Light	Salyu x Haruka Nakamura	Toy's Factory	
8	X	Generations from Exile Tribe	Rhythm Zone	
14	Beyond	W-inds	Pony Canyon	
15	Full Course	Virgorman	Toy's Factory	
15	Junk or Gem	Tokyo Ska Paradise Orchestra	Cutting Edge	
15	Sugar Salt Pepper Green	Sumika	Sony Music Records	
15	Second Sparkle	Liella!	Lantis	
19	The World Doesn't Know You Yet	Mariko Kouda	Wonder Factory	
22	Big Love	Angerme	Hachama	
22	Fanfare	Little Glee Monster	GR8!	
22	Dear Violet	Purple Kiss	Victor	
22	Bokurano	Eve	Toy's Factory	
23	Birthday	Kira	Waka Japan	
24	The Other One	Babymetal	Babymetal; Amuse; Toy's Factory; Cooking Vinyl America; 5B	
27	Seijakuasamaki	Silent Killa Joint	9Castle Studio	
29	Ni	Yuuri	Ariola Japan	
29	Tamentai	Tani Yuuki	Valley	
29	Ima no Futari o Otagai ga Miteru	Aiko	Pony Canyon	

=== April ===
Date	Album	Artist	Label	Ref.
5	I Love You	Hiroya Ozaki	SME	
5	Magic Lantern	Yorushika	Polydor Records	
11	Rebel	DKB	Danmee	
12	Ichijikikoku	Atarashii Gakko!	Victor	
12	Last Aurorally	Ling Tosite Sigure	Sony Music Associated	
12	Ninth Peel	Unison Square Garden	Toy's Factory	
12	The Message 5	MC Tyson	Eldeen Industry	
12	Izora	Buck-Tick	Victor	
12	In the Name of Hiphop II	Tha Boss	Tha Blue Herb Records	
12	The Greatest Day	All at Once	B Zone	
12	The Runaway Train From Hell	Sex Machineguns	Anchor Records	
12	Soul Navigation	Masayuki Suzuki	Epic Records	
19	Xanadu	ExWhyZ	EMI	
19	Soar	Mari Hamada	Victor	
19	Parade	FictionJunction	Sacra Music	
21	Crimson & Jet Black	Anthem	Ward Records	
26	Naked	Chanmina	No Label	
26	Our Teen: Yellow Side	TFN	Ariola Japan	
26	Jazz"n"Kumiko	Kumiko Yamashita	Judgment! Records	
28	Rich or Die 2	YZERR	Bad Hop	

=== May ===
Date	Album	Artist	Label	Ref.
3	Dancehall Magic	BRADIO	Crown	
10	Fine Line	Pasocom Music Club	Hatihati Pro	
10	Hajimete no – EP	Yoasobi	Sony Japan	
10	Our Parade	Gang Parade	Fueled By Mentaiko	
10	Gyakkou Bibouroku	Penguin Research	Sacra Music	
17	Himitsu Studio	Spitz	Polydor	
17	Pink Blue	Ryokuoushoku Shakai	Epic Japan	
17	Airport	Sakura Fujiwara	Speedstar	
17	Psychic File I	Psychic Fever from Exile Tribe	LDH Records	
24	Heat Wave	Superfly	Universal Sigma	
24	Kimi to Iu Sakura no Hanabira ga Boku no Kokoro ni Maiorita	Yesung	Avex Trax	
24	Anison Covers	Hiroko Moriguchi	Sonic Blade	
24	Ghost Pop	Keina Suda	unBORDE	
24	Shiroto Hanataba	Saori Hayami	Warner Bros. Japan	
26	Seasons Selection 〜Summer〜	Kobukuro	Warner Music Japan	
27	Wani	Aural Vampire	Yottabyte	
31	Wave	Ive	Ariola Japan	
31	I	Kazuki Hayashi	LDH Records	
31	Vento de Felicidade〜Shiawasenokaze〜	T-Square	Orange Lady	
31	Bee and The Whales	Galileo Galilei	Ouchi Daisuki Club	

=== June ===
Date	Album	Artist	Label	Ref.
5	Moving Pieces – EP	Travis Japan	Capitol	
6	Canary Final Movement: CODA	Crack 6	Cutting Edge	
7	Survive	Yellow Bucks	To the Top Gang	
7	Jinkougaku	Zutomayo	EMI Records	
13	Delicious	The Boyz	Universal IST	
14	Ren'ai Shijō Shugi	Kana-Boon	Kioon	
14	Tales of a World	Yukihide "YT" Takiyama	B Zone	
14	Love: Amplified	Tatsuya Kitani	Mastersix Foundation	
14	Surf Bungaku Kamakura (Half Carton)	Asian Kung-Fu Generation	Kioon Music	
14	Jewel	M!lk	Colorful Records	
14	Devotion	TM Network	Sony Music Direct	
14	20th Century For The People	20th Century	Ment Recording	
15	Hey Hey R&R	Twinzer	AIK Stream	
21	Arigato	Never Young Beach	Roman Label	
21	First Album	Kiss Kiss	WACK	
21	Under Mentality	TUYU	Pony Canyon	
21	Open the Window	Rhymester	Starplayers Records	
23	Milestone	Doberman Infinity	LDH Records	
28	Dream in Dream	Cornelius	Warner Music Japan	
28	Rokotsu	Syudou	Syudou Shop	
28	Bish the Best	Bish	WACK	
30	Visitors	Friday Night Plans	Friday Night Plans	

=== July ===
Date	Album	Artist	Label	Ref.
4	Antenna	Mrs. Green Apple	EMI	
5	Surf Bungaku Kamakura Complete	Asian Kung-Fu Generation	Kioon Music	
5	Sweet	Tomorrow X Together	Big Hit; Republic	
5	Nansha ~Junen Jyoshi~	Shiori Niiyama	B Zone	
12	Pop Mall	Naniwa Danshi	J Storm	
19	Level 9.9	Ran Itō	GT	
19	Coconut	NiziU	JYP; Epic Japan	
19	Enigmasis	Uverworld	Gr8!	
19	Where Our Blue Is	Tatsuya Kitani	Mastersix Foundation	
19	Supply/Demand	Mononoke	Mono Records	
19	SuperBloom	TrySail	Sacra Music	
26	Open a Door	Aimer	Sacra Music	
26	Reborn Superstar!	Hanabie.	Epic Japan	
26	Masterpiece	MiSaMo	Warner Japan	
26	I vs I	Wagakki Band	Universal Sigma	
31	Rainbow-Colored History	Strawberry Prince	STPR Records	

=== August ===
Date	Album	Artist	Label	Ref.
2	10carat	BsGirls	Avex Trax	
9	Not Legend	Ozrosaurus	All My Homies	
16	Peace	King & Prince	Johnny's Universe	
16	Alpaca 5	Subaru Shibutani	World Art	
17	Polaris	Chen	Avex Music Creative	
23	Respect All	Ai	EMI	
23	Always Yours	Seventeen	Hybe Japan	
28	So Bad, It's Real	Ziggy	Rockguild	
30	5am	Milet	SME	
30	Pado	Pentagon	Warner Japan	
30	Aoi Sora Dake Ja Nai	Chage	USM Japan	
30	And So Henceforth,	Orangestar	Pony Canyon	
30	Version 5.0	Wands	D-Go	
30	Dancejillion	Keytalk	Virgin	

=== September ===
Date	Album	Artist	Label	Ref.
6	40	Ms.Ooja	Universal Sigma	
6	Social Path / Super Bowl (Japanese Ver.)	Stray Kids	Epic Japan	
6	Infinity	Bonnie Pink	Warner Japan	
6	Explore	Exile Takahiro	Rhythm Zone	
6	Shikisokuzekuu	Ningen Isu	Tokuma	
6	40	Earthshaker	King Records	
8	Seasons Selection 〜Autumn〜	Kobukuro	Warner Japan	
20	Equinox	JO1	Lapone	
20	Crop	Orange Spiny Crab	Warner Japan	
22	Chai	Chai	Sub Pop	
27	New DNA	XG	Xgalx	

=== October ===
Date	Album	Artist	Label	Ref.
4	The Book 3	Yoasobi	Sony Japan	
4	Miss You	Mr. Children	Toy Factory	
10	Bubbling	Aimers	Hyper Rhythm	
11	The X	Seo In-guk	The Star E & M	
18	Ringo	Itzy	Warner Japan	
18	Supermoon	Ai Furihata	Purple One Star	
25	Pleasures	CNBLUE	Warner Music Japan	
25	Tokyo Emotional Gakuen	Bigmama	Fuze Records	
25	Bible -Milky Blue-	Seiko Matsuda	Sony Music Direct	

=== November ===
Date	Album	Artist	Label	Ref.
8	The Magical Listener	Kashitaro Ito	Victor	
8	Myakuutsukanjyo	Hinatazaka46	Sony Records	
15	Best of the Tank-top	Yabai T-Shirts Yasan	Universal Sigma	
22	Nice'n Slow Jam -beyond-	Skoop On Somebody	SME	
29	Carousel Circle	Carnation	Panam	
29	The Greatest Unknown	King Gnu	Ariola Japan	

=== December ===
Date	Album	Artist	Label	Ref.
5	Fantastic Rocket	Fantastics from Exile Tribe	LDH Records	
13	Ado's Utattemita Album	Ado	Virgin	
13	Dat Girl	Yuto Adachi	Rink	
13	Nyang Nyang Oeeee	Ano	Toy's Factory	
13	○	Ikimonogakari	Epic Records	
20	Deeper	Tatsuya Ishii	Sony Music	
26	Proxima	TAN	Nippon Columbia	

== Disbanding and retiring artists ==
=== Disbanding ===
- Bad Hop
- Bish
- Boysgroup
- B.O.L.T
- For Tracy Hyde
- Lovelys

=== Going on hiatus ===
- Haruka Yamazaki
