= Going to Destruction =

Studio album by Bish
- Released: August 4, 2021
- Genres: Alternative rock; punk rock
- Length: 52:48
- Language: Japanese
- Label: Avex Trax
- Producers: Kenta Matsukuma, JxSxK

Bish chronology
Letters (2020)	Going to Destruction (2021)

Going to Destruction (stylized as GOiNG TO DESTRUCTiON) is the sixth and final album by Japanese idol group Bish released through Avex Trax on August 4, 2021.

== Track listing ==
No.	Title	Lyrics	Music	Length
1.	"Can We Still Be??"	Kenta Matsukuma, JxSxK	Kenta Matsukuma
2.	"In Case..."	JxSxK	Kenta Matsukuma
3.	"Stacking"	Iku Ryuguji	Kenta Matsukuma
4.	"Be Ready"	JxSxK	Kenta Matsukuma
5.	"Zenshin Zenrei"	Kenta Matsukuma, JxSxK	Kenta Matsukuma
6.	"Natural Born Lovers"	Aina the End	Kenta Matsukuma
7.	"I Have No Idea."	Iku Ryuguji	Kenta Matsukuma
8.	"With You"	Momoko Gumi Company	Kenta Matsukuma
9.	"KuruuKuruu" (狂う狂う)	Centchihiro Chittiii	Kenta Matsukuma
10.	"My Way"	Kenta Matsukuma, JxSxK	Kenta Matsukuma
11.	"Beginning, End and Beginning"	Ayuni D	Kenta Matsukuma
12.	"Story of Duty"	Aina the End	Kenta Matsukuma
13.	"Broken"	JxSxK	Kenta Matsukuma
14.	"Star"	Ayuni D	Kenta Matsukuma
Total length:				52:48

== Charts ==
Chart	Peak position
Japanese Albums (Oricon)	1
Japanese Albums (Billboard)	1
