= The Guerrilla Bish =

THE GUERRiLLA BiSH

Studio album by Bish
- Released: November 4~5, 2017 (Surprise CD Release), November 6, 2017 (One Day Digital Release), November 26, 2017 (CD)
- Genres: Punk rock; pop punk; dance-punk; alternative metal
- Length: 52:00
- Languages: Japanese, English
- Label: Avex Trax
- Producers: Kenta Matsukuma, JxSxK

Bish chronology
Giant Killers (2017)	THE GUERRiLLA BiSH (2017)	Carrots and Sticks (2019)

Singles from The Guerrilla Bish
- 1. "Promise The Star" Released: March 22, 2017

Alternative covers
- Cover for LIVE Edition

Alternative cover
- Cover for Limited Edition

The Guerrilla Bish (stylized as THE GUERRiLLA BiSH) is the fourth album by Japanese idol group Bish released through Avex Trax on November 26, 2017. A simple CD version of the album was surprise released exclusive to Tower Records for two days from November 4~5, priced at 299 yen. The album was also digitally released through iTunes for one day on November 6 for 300 yen. The album was preceded by the single "Promise The Star", released on March 22, 2017, and the EP GiANT KiLLERS, released on June 28, 2017. The music video for the track "My landscape" was posted on YouTube on November 4, followed by the music video for "SMACK baby SMACK" on November 30.

== Track listing ==
No.	Title	Lyrics	Music	Length
1.	"My landscape"	JxSxK	Kenta Matsukuma	5:34
2.	"SHARR"	Momoko Gumi Company	Kenta Matsukuma	3:41
3.	"GiANT KiLLERS"	Iku Ryukyuji	Kenta Matsukuma	4:33
4.	"SMACK baby SMACK"	Iku Ryukyuji	Kenta Matsukuma	3:52
5.	"spare of despair"	Ayuni D	Kenta Matsukuma	3:56
6.	"Promise The Star" (プロミスザスター)	JxSxK & Kenta Matsukuma	Kenta Matsukuma	4:28
7.	"JAM"	Momoko Gumi Company	Kenta Matsukuma	4:02
8.	"Here's looking at you, kid."	Lingling	Kenta Matsukuma	4:03
9.	"Rock 'n' Roll no Kamisama" (ろっくんろおるのかみさま)	Centchihiro Chittiii	Kenta Matsukuma	2:39
10.	"BODiES"	Momoko Gumi Company	Kenta Matsukuma	3:40
11.	"ALLS"	Aina the End	Kenta Matsukuma	3:34
12.	"pearl" (ぱーる)	Hashiyasume Atsuko	Kenta Matsukuma	3:53
13.	"FOR HiM"	JxSxK & Kenta Matsukuma	Kenta Matsukuma	4:05

Live & Limited Edition Disc 2: 2017.06.28 YOYOGI PARK YOYOGi GiANT KiLLERS + 2017.08.23 ZEPP TOKYO TOKYO BiSH SHiNE 3 DVD/Blu-Ray
No.	Title	Length
1.	"GiANT KiLLERS"
2.	"Marionette"
3.	"Nothing."
4.	"Shakai no Rule" (社会のルール)
5.	"VOMiT SONG"
6.	"Promise The Star" (プロミスザスター)
7.	"Saraba kana" (サラバかな)
8.	"BiSH -Hoshi ga Matataku Yoru ni-" (BiSH -星が瞬く夜に-)
9.	"SCHOOL GIRLS, BANG BANG"
10.	"GiANT KiLLERS"
11.	"VOMiT SONG"
12.	"Departures" (デパーチャーズ)
13.	"OTNK"
14.	"Shakai no Rule" (社会のルール)
15.	"Is this call??"
16.	"Spark" (スパーク)
17.	"Primitive"
18.	"pirapiro" (ぴらぴろ)
19.	"MONSTERS"
20.	"Marionette"
21.	"Nothing."
22.	"ALL YOU NEED IS LOVE"
23.	"beautiful sa" (beautifulさ)
24.	"BiSH -Hoshi ga Matataku Yoru ni-" (BiSH -星が瞬く夜に-)
25.	"Promise The Star (Music Video)" (プロミスザスター *Exclusive to Limited Edition Blu-ray)
26.	"GiANT KiLLERS (Music Video)" (*Exclusive to Limited Edition Blu-ray)
27.	"Nothing. (Music Video)" (*Exclusive to Limited Edition Blu-ray)
28.	"My landscape (Music Video)" (*Exclusive to Limited Edition Blu-ray)
29.	"Making of "My landscape" music video in L.A." (*Exclusive to Limited Edition Blu-ray)

== Personnel ==
- BiSH
  - Centchihiro Chittiii – vocals
  - Aina the End – vocals; lyrics on Track 11
  - Momoko Gumi Company – vocals; lyrics on Tracks 2, 7 and 10
  - Lingling – vocals; lyrics on Track 8
  - Hashiyasume Atsuko – vocals; lyrics on Track 12
  - Ayuni D – vocals; lyrics on Track 5

== Notes ==
- All writing, arrangement and personnel credits taken from the album insert and from track previews posted on Twitter.
