= Letters (Bish album) =

Studio album by Bish
- Released: July 22, 2020
- Genres: Pop punk; dance-punk
- Length: 28:29
- Language: Japanese
- Label: Avex Trax
- Producers: Kenta Matsukuma, JxSxK

Bish chronology
Carrots and Sticks (2019)	Letters (2020)	Going to Destruction (2021)

Letters (stylized as LETTERS) is considered the "major 3.5th" album by Japanese idol group Bish released through Avex Trax on July 22, 2020.

== Track listing ==
No.	Title	Lyrics	Music	Length
1.	"Letters"	JxSxK, Kenta Matsukuma	Kenta Matsukuma
2.	"Tomorrow"	JxSxK, Kenta Matsukuma	Kenta Matsukuma
3.	"Super Hero Music" (スーパーヒーローミュージック)	Ayuni D	Kenta Matsukuma
4.	"Rokenro" (ロケンロー)	Kenta Matsukuma, JxSxK	Kenta Matsukuma
5.	"co"	JxSxK	Kenta Matsukuma
6.	"Buchinuke" (ぶち抜け)	Momoko Gumi Company	Kenta Matsukuma
7.	"I'm waiting for my dawn"	Centchihiro Chittiii	Kenta Matsukuma
Total length:				28:29

== Charts ==
Chart	Peak position
Japanese Albums (Oricon)	1
Japanese Albums (Billboard)	1
