= Fake Metal Jacket =

FAKE METAL JACKET

Studio album by Bish
- Released: January 20, 2016
- Genres: Alternative rock; pop punk; dance-punk; alternative metal
- Length: 56:35
- Languages: Japanese, English
- Label: Sub Trax
- Producers: Kenta Matsukuma, JxSxK

Bish chronology
| Brand-New Idol Shit (2015) | FAKE METAL JACKET (2016) | Killer Bish (2016) |

Singles from Fake Metal Jacket
- 1. "OTNK" Released: September 2, 2015

Fake Metal Jacket (stylized as FAKE METAL JACKET) is the second album by Japanese idol group Bish released through the independent label Sub Trax on January 20, 2016. The album is the first full album by the group to feature Lingling and Hashiyasume Atsuko, who joined the group on August 5, 2015. The album features four re-recorded versions of tracks from their first album, updated to feature the two new members. Like their debut album Brand-new idol Shit, songs from the album were posted for streaming on SoundCloud little by little on the group's account as well as being released as free downloads on Ototoy for a limited time. All new songs from the album were eventually streamable, and the music videos for both the new version of "MONSTERS", and "ALL YOU NEED IS LOVE" were uploaded on YouTube. The album was preceded by the single "OTNK", released on September 2, 2015.

== Track listing ==
| No. | Title | Lyrics | Music | Length |
|---|---|---|---|---|
| 1. | "Spark" (スパーク) | JxSxK | Kenta Matsukuma | 5:35 |
| 2. | "BiSH -Hoshi ga Matataku Yoru ni-" (BiSH -星が瞬く夜に-; "BiSH: On a Night When Stars are Twinkling") | Bish & JxSxK & Kenta Matsukuma | Kenta Matsukuma | 4:37 |
| 3. | "MONSTERS" | Yukako Love Deluxe | Kenta Matsukuma | 3:30 |
| 4. | "Primitive" | Hashiyasume Atsuko & JxSxK | Ichiro Iguchi | 4:46 |
| 5. | "beautiful sa" (beautifulさ) | Lingling | Kenta Matsukuma | 4:37 |
| 6. | "OTNK" | Iku Ryukyuji | Kenta Matsukuma | 4:02 |
| 7. | "Migatte I Need You" (身勝手あいにーじゅー) | Hug Mii | Kenta Matsukuma | 3:27 |
| 8. | "Departures" (デパーチャーズ) | Momoko Gumi Company | Kenta Matsukuma | 3:45 |
| 9. | "Want" (ウォント) | Momoko Gumi Company | Kenta Matsukuma | 3:39 |
| 10. | "Saraba Kana" (サラバかな) | Iku Ryukyuji | Shinnosuke (from Mushi Furuu Yoru ni) | 4:41 |
| 11. | "ALL YOU NEED IS LOVE" | Bish & JxSxK & Kenta Matsukuma | Kenta Matsukuma | 4:55 |
| 12. | "DEAR..." | Momoko Gumi Company | Kenta Matsukuma | 4:36 |
| 13. | "BUDOKAN ka Moshiku wa TAMANEGI" (BUDOKANかもしくはTAMANEGI) | Centchihiro Chittiii & JxSxK & Kenta Matsukuma | Kenta Matsukuma | 4:29 |

== Personnel ==
- BiSH – Lyrics on Track 2
  - Centchihiro Chittiii – vocals; lyrics on Track 13
  - Aina the End – vocals
  - Momoko Gumi Company – vocals; lyrics on Tracks 8, 9 and 12
  - Hug Mii – vocals; lyrics on Track 7
  - Lingling – vocals; lyrics on Track 5
  - Hashiyasume Atsuko – vocals; lyrics on Track 4
- Ex. Bish
  - Yukako Love Deluxe – lyrics on Track 3

== Notes ==
- All writing, arrangement and personnel credits taken from the album insert.
