= Carrots and Sticks (album) =

Studio album by Bish
- Released: April 3, 2019 (Sticks EP); May 3, 2019 (Carrots EP); July 3, 2019 (full release)
- Genres: Punk rock; pop punk; dance-punk; alternative metal
- Length: 58:28
- Language: Japanese
- Label: Avex Trax
- Producers: Kenta Matsukuma, JxSxK

Bish chronology
The Guerrilla Bish (2017)	Carrots and Sticks (2019)	Letters (2020)

STiCKS cover

CARROTS cover

Carrots and Sticks (stylized as CARROTS and STiCKS) is the fifth album by Japanese idol group Bish released through Avex Trax on July 3, 2019. The album was released in three parts: Sticks (stylized as STiCKS, an EP) on April 3, Carrots (stylized as CARROTS, also an EP) on May 3, and the full version on July 3. The two EPs contained four songs each, while the full version contained an additional six songs for a combined fourteen songs.

== History ==
The album was first announced on April 1, 2019, during Bish's theater screening of Bring Icing Shit Horse Tour Final "The Nude", a film documenting the group's concert "Bring Icing Shit Horse Tour" at Makuhari Messe in December 2018. On the same day, a video detailing the release schedule of the album accompanied by a song in the album, "Tsuinishi", was released on YouTube. In the video, producer Kenta Matsukuma described Sticks as containing songs that were "dirty, can't sell, and noisy", while Carrots would contain "sellable, cool" songs. The EPs were distributed exclusively through Apple Music.

On June 12, Bish "released" the entire album through Tower Records 21 days before the official release date, a stunt also pulled for the previous album, The Guerrilla Bish. However, it was soon revealed that the album was a fake: all fourteen songs were performed by producers Kenta Matsukuma and JxSxK under the name "Beat Mint Boyz". The real version was released on Apple Music the following day. Nevertheless, the fake album managed to climb to 6th place on the Oricon weekly charts.

=== Release timeline ===
- April 2: "Tsuinishi" released on YouTube
- April 3: Sticks, an EP containing four songs, released on Apple Music
- May 2: "I Am Me" released on YouTube
- May 3: Carrots, another EP containing four songs, released on Apple Music
- June 11: "Distance" broadcast on Tokyo FM's program, "School of Lock!"
- June 12: "Distance" released on YouTube; fake version sold at Tower Records
- June 13: Full album pre-released on Apple Music
- July 3: Official release of full album

== Track listing ==
No.	Title	Lyrics	Music	Notes	Length
1.	"DISTANCE"	Kenta Matsukuma & JxSxK	Kenta Matsukuma		3:53
2.	"Tsunishi" (遂に死)	JxSxK	Kenta Matsukuma	Included in Sticks	3:09
3.	"MORE THAN LiKE"	Kenta Matsukuma & JxSxK	Kenta Matsukuma		4:00
4.	"FREEZE DRY THE PASTS"	Kenta Matsukuma & JxSxK	Kenta Matsukuma	Included in Sticks	3:52
5.	"CHOP"	Momoko Gumi Company	Kenta Matsukuma		3:38
6.	"I am me."	Kenta Matsukuma & JxSxK	Kenta Matsukuma	Included in Carrots	4:25
7.	"NO SWEET"	Kenta Matsukuma & JxSxK	Kenta Matsukuma	Included in Carrots	4:42
8.	"O・S"	Lingling	Kenta Matsukuma		3:24
9.	"Mada Tochū" (まだ途中)	Momoko Gumi Company	Kenta Matsukuma	Included in Carrots	3:42
10.	"Yasashii PAiN" (優しいPAiN)	Kenta Matsukuma & JxSxK	Kenta Matsukuma	Included in Sticks	5:31
11.	"Identity" (アイデンティティ)	Kenta Matsukuma & JxSxK	Kenta Matsukuma		4:05
12.	"FiNALLY"	Centchihiro Chittiii	Kenta Matsukuma	Included in Sticks	3:47
13.	"CAN YOU??"	Aina the End & JxSxK	Kenta Matsukuma	Included in Carrots	5:06
14.	"GRUNGE WORLD"	JxSxK	Kenta Matsukuma		4:54
Total length:					58:28

Bonus CD (limited editions only)
No.	Title	Lyrics	Music	Notes	Length
1.	"Paint It Black"	Kenta Matsukuma & JxSxK	Kenta Matsukuma		3:51
2.	"Life is beautiful"	Renai Yoshio	Kenta Matsukuma		4:22
3.	"HiDE the BLUE"	Kenta Matsukuma & JxSxK	Kenta Matsukuma		4:17
4.	"NON TiE-UP"	Kenta Matsukuma & JxSxK	Kenta Matsukuma		5:56
5.	"stereo future"	Kenta Matsukuma & JxSxK	Kenta Matsukuma		4:30
6.	"Futarinara" (二人なら)	Aina the End	Kenta Matsukuma		3:52
7.	"Small Fish"	Kenta Matsukuma & JxSxK	Kenta Matsukuma	From Fist of the North Star 35th anniversary album	4:42
Total length:					30:56

Sticks (EP)
No.	Title	Lyrics	Music	Length
1.	"Tsunishi" (遂に死)	JxSxK	Kenta Matsukuma	3:09
2.	"FiNALLY"	Centchihiro Chittiii	Kenta Matsukuma	3:47
3.	"Yasashii PAiN" (優しいPAiN)	Kenta Matsukuma & JxSxK	Kenta Matsukuma	5:31
4.	"FREEZE DRY THE PASTS"	Kenta Matsukuma & JxSxK	Kenta Matsukuma	3:52

Carrots (EP)
No.	Title	Lyrics	Music	Length
1.	"I am me."	Kenta Matsukuma & JxSxK	Kenta Matsukuma	4:25
2.	"Mada Tochū" (まだ途中)	Momoko Gumi Company	Kenta Matsukuma	3:42
3.	"CAN YOU??"	Aina the End & JxSxK	Kenta Matsukuma	5:06
4.	"NO SWEET"	Kenta Matsukuma & JxSxK	Kenta Matsukuma	4:42

== Charts ==
Title	Peak chart positions	
Title	JPN Oricon	JPN Hot 100
Fake edition	6	
Full edition	4	
