= Brand-New Idol Shit (album) =

Brand-New idol Shit

Studio album by Bish
- Released: May 27, 2015
- Genres: Alternative rock; pop punk; dance-punk; alternative metal
- Length: 51:17
- Languages: Japanese, English
- Label: Sub Trax
- Producers: Kenta Matsukuma, JxSxK

Bish chronology
Brand-New idol Shit (2015)	Fake Metal Jacket (2016)

Brand-New Idol Shit (stylized as Brand-new idol SHiT) is the debut album by Japanese idol group Bish released through the independent label Sub Trax on May 27, 2015. The album is the first physical release by the group. Songs from the album were posted for streaming on SoundCloud little by little on the group's account. By the time the album was released all tracks except "BiSH -Hoshi ga Matataku Yoru ni-" (which was uploaded on YouTube), were available for streaming. The same songs were available for a limited time as free downloads on Ototoy.

== Last minute departure of Yukako Love Deluxe ==
Yukako Love Deluxe left the group during the recording of this album, which lead to a rushed session in which her unrecorded parts were reassigned to other members. This is why her only contributions on the record are vocals on "Spark" and lyrics. In addition the cover art depicts a torn photo of the group with Watanabe. This came to be due to the lack of time staff had between Yukako's departure and the deadline for deciding on a design. They decided to rip Yukako from an existing photo, which became the final choice.

== Track listing ==
No.	Title	Lyrics	Music	Length
1.	"Spark" (スパーク)	JxSxK	Kenta Matsukuma	5:35
2.	"BiSH -Hoshi ga Matataku Yoru ni-" (BiSH -星が瞬く夜に-; "BiSH: On a Night When Stars are Twinkling")	Bish & JxSxK & Kenta Matsukuma	Kenta Matsukuma	4:37
3.	"MONSTERS"	Yukako Love Deluxe	Kenta Matsukuma	3:29
4.	"Is this call??"	Aina the End	Kenta Matsukuma	3:43
5.	"Saraba Kana" (サラバかな; "Is this goodbye")	Iku Ryukyuji	Shinnosuke (from Mushi Furuu Yoru ni)	4:39
6.	"SCHOOL GIRLS, BANG BANG"	Centchihiro Chittiii	MAD SOUNDS	3:04
7.	"DA DANCE!!"	Momoko Gumi Company	Kenta Matsukuma	3:23
8.	"TOUMIN SHOJO"	Yukako Love Deluxe	Kenta Matsukuma	3:12
9.	"Pirapiro" (ぴらぴろ)	Momoko Gumi Company	Kenta Matsukuma	3:58
10.	"Lonely girl"	Yukako Love Deluxe	Takumi Sanada	4:10
11.	"HUG ME"	Hug Mii	Minori Kojima	4:12
12.	"Karada Ideology" (カラダ・イデオロギー)	Yukari	Limited Express (Has Gone ?)	1:56
13.	"Story Brighter"	Centchihiro Chittiii	Kenta Matsukuma	5:25

== Personnel ==
- BiSH – Lyrics on Track 2
  - Centchihiro Chittiii – vocals; lyrics on Tracks 6 and 13
  - Aina the End – vocals; lyrics on Track 4
  - Momoko Gumi Company – vocals; lyrics on Tracks 7 and 9
  - Hug Mii – vocals; lyrics on Track 11
- Ex. Bish
  - Yukako Love Deluxe – vocals on Track 1; lyrics on Tracks 3, 8 and 10

== Notes ==
- All writing, arrangement and personnel credits taken from the album insert.
