= Giant Killers (EP) =

EP by Bish
- Released: June 9, 2017 (iTunes), June 28, 2017 (CD)
- Genres: Punk rock; pop punk
- Length: 19:06 (Standard Edition), 71:19 (Limited & INTRODUCiNG BiSH Editions)
- Languages: Japanese, English
- Label: Avex Trax
- Producers: Kenta Matsukuma, JxSxK

Bish chronology
Killer Bish (2016)	Giant Killers (2017)	The Guerrilla Bish (2017)

Alternative covers
- Cover for Limited Edition

Alternative cover
- Cover for LIVE Edition

Alternative cover
- Cover for INTRODUCiNG BiSH Edition

Giant Killers (stylized as GiANT KiLLERS) is the first EP by Japanese idol group Bish released through Avex Trax on June 28, 2017. The EP was released in 4 editions, with the Limited and "INTRODUCiNG BiSH" editions featuring a second disc titled "INTRODUCiNG BiSH", which is essentially a "Best Of" album. All tracks on the disc originally released before Ayuni D joined the group have been re-recorded with her vocals. The EP was released early through iTunes on June 9. Those that pre-ordered the iTunes edition of the EP on June 8 received both the EP and the "INTRODUCiNG BiSH" tracks for the price of 900 yen. The music video for the title track "GiANT KiLLERS" was released on YouTube on June 12, followed by the video for "Nothing." on July 31.

== Track listing ==
No.	Title	Lyrics	Music	Length
1.	"GiANT KiLLERS"	Iku Ryukyuji	Kenta Matsukuma	4:36
2.	"Marionette"	Momoko Gumi Company	Kenta Matsukuma	3:14
3.	"Nothing."	Momoko Gumi Company	Kenta Matsukuma	4:43
4.	"Shakai no Rule" (社会のルール)	Hashiyasume Atsuko	Kenta Matsukuma	3:01
5.	"VOMiT SONG"	Lingling	Kenta Matsukuma	3:32

INTRODUCiNG BiSH
No.	Title	Lyrics	Music	Length
1.	"Spark" (スパーク)	JxSxK	Kenta Matsukuma	5:35
2.	"BiSH -Hoshi ga Matataku Yoru ni-" (BiSH -星が瞬く夜に-)	BiSH, JxSxK, Kenta Matsukuma	Kenta Matsukuma	4:36
3.	"MONSTERS"	Yukako Love Deluxe	Kenta Matsukuma	3:27
4.	"Saraba Kana" (サラバかな)	Iku Ryukyuji	Shinnosuke (from Mushi Furuu Yoru ni)	4:37
5.	"Pirapiro" (ぴらぴろ)	Momoko Gumi Company	Kenta Matsukuma	3:57
6.	"OTNK"	Iku Ryukyuji	Kenta Matsukuma	4:02
7.	"beautiful sa" (beautifulさ)	Lingling	Kenta Matsukuma	4:37
8.	"ALL YOU NEED IS LOVE"	BiSH, JxSxK, Kenta Matsukuma	Kenta Matsukuma	4:52
9.	"DEADMAN"	BiSH, JxSxK, Kenta Matsukuma	Kenta Matsukuma	1:37
10.	"Orchestra" (オーケストラ)	JxSxK, Kenta Matsukuma	Kenta Matsukuma	5:41
11.	"Hontou Honki" (本当本気)	Ayuni D	Kenta Matsukuma	4:44
12.	"Promise The Star" (プロミスザスター)	JxSxK, Kenta Matsukuma	Kenta Matsukuma	4:28
Total length:				52:13

LIVE Edition Disc 2 DVD & Limited Edition Disc 3 Blu-Ray: 2017.03.19 ZEPP TOKYO BiSH NEVERMiND TOUR FiNAL
No.	Title	Length
1.	"Am I FRENZY?"
2.	"DEADMAN"
3.	"OTNK"
4.	"Want" (ウォント)
5.	"Hontou Honki" (本当本気)
6.	"Hey Gate"
7.	"First Kitchen Life" (ファーストキッチンライフ)
8.	"Departures" (デパーチャーズ)
9.	"DA DANCE!!"
10.	"Primitive"
11.	"My Distinction"
12.	"Saraba Kana" (サラバかな)
13.	"Spark" (スパーク)
14.	"Stairway to me"
15.	"Hero Wannabe" (ヒーローワナビー)
16.	"MONSTERS"
17.	"beautiful sa" (beautifulさ)
18.	"Pirapiro" (ぴらぴろ)
19.	"Orchestra" (オーケストラ)
20.	"Promise The Star" (プロミスザスター)
21.	"ALL YOU NEED IS LOVE"
22.	"BiSH -Hoshi ga Matataku Yoru ni-" (BiSH -星が瞬く夜に-)
23.	"BiSH -Hoshi ga Matataku Yoru ni-" (BiSH -星が瞬く夜に-)
24.	"GiANT KiLLERS Music Video" (Exclusive to Limited Edition)

== Personnel ==
- BiSH – Lyrics on Disc 2 Tracks 1, 8 and 9
  - Centchihiro Chittiii – vocals
  - Aina the End – vocals
  - Momoko Gumi Company – vocals; lyrics on Tracks 2, 3 and Disc 2 Track 5
  - Lingling – vocals; lyrics on Tracks 5 and Disc 2 Track 7
  - Hashiyasume Atsuko – vocals; lyrics on Track 4
  - Ayuni D – vocals; lyrics on Disc 2 Track 11
- Ex. Bish
  - Yukako Love Deluxe – lyrics on Disc 2 Track 3

== Notes ==
- All writing, arrangement and personnel credits taken from the album insert and from track previews posted on Twitter.
