= Pedro (band) =

Japanese rock band

- Origin: Tokyo, Japan
- Genres: Rock
- Years active: 2018–2021; 2023–present
- Labels: Avex Trax; EMI
- Members: Ayuni D; Hisako Tabuchi; Yumao
- Website: www.pedro.tokyo

Pedro (stylized in all caps) is a Japanese rock band led by vocalist and bassist Ayuni D. Formed in 2018 as Ayuni D's solo project outside of Bish, she is currently supported by Hisako Tabuchi of Number Girl on guitar and Yumao of hitorie on drums. They released their debut EP in September 2018 and continued to release music until the end of 2021. Following a one and a half year hiatus, Pedro resumed activities in mid-2023 after Bish disbanded. They have released four studio albums, two EPs, and three singles.

== History ==
In September 2018, WACK announced that Ayuni D would launch a solo project with Avex Trax under the name Pedro. Ayuni D, who plays bass and provides the vocals, was joined by former Number Girl member Hisako Tabuchi on guitar and Shōta Mōhri on drums. Their debut EP, Zoozoosea, was released on September 19, 2018.

In March 2019, it was announced the Pedro had signed with the EMI Records division of Universal Music Japan. Their first album, Thumb Sucker, was released on August 28.

On March 6, 2020, a re-recording of Zoozoosea, titled Super Zoozoosea, was released digitally. They released their second EP, Shōdō Ningen Club (衝動人間倶楽部), on April 29. Followed by their first single, "Konaide World End" (来ないでワールドエンド) on August 12. Their second album, Roman (浪漫), was released on August 26.

They released their second single, "Tokyo" (東京), on February 10, 2021. On February 26, the digital single, "Teinei na Kurashi" (丁寧な暮らし), was released, followed by another digital single, "Natsu" (夏), on August 6. They released their third album, Gojitsu Aratamete Ukagaimasu (後日改めて伺います), on November 17. Pedro went on an indefinite hiatus on December 22, after their final concert at Yokohama Arena. A digital single, "Sasurahi" (さすらひ), was released on December 27, five days after they ceased acitivies.

On June 30, 2023, after the disbandment of Bish, Pedro announced that they would resume activities outside of WACK under Ayuni D's newly established company, Roman Planet. Hisako Tabuchi remained a member of the band, while Yumao of Hitorie replaced Shōta Mōhri on drums. They released a reissue of their third album, which was renamed Gojitsu Aratamete Ukagaimashita (後日改めて伺いました), on July 5. On August 18, a re-recording of their song "Roman" (浪漫) was released digitally. They released their third single, "Tonde Yuke" (飛んでゆけ), on August 23. Their fourth album, Omomuku Mama ni I no Muku Mama ni (赴くままに、胃の向くままに), was released on November 29.

They released their third EP, Iji to Hikari (意地と光), on November 6, 2024.

In 2026, PEDRO collaborated with Taiwanese band Sorry Youth (拍謝少年) releasing a single titled "Outta My Way". AYUNi D performed with Sorry Youth at the MegaPort Festival in Kaohsiung on 21 March 2026.

== Members ==
- Ayuni D (アユニ・D) – vocals, bass (2018–2021; 2023–present)

Current support members

- Hisako Tabuchi (と田渕ひさ子) – guitar (2018–2021; 2023–present)
- Yumao (ゆーまお) – drums (2023–present)

Former support member

- Shōta Mōhri (毛利匠太) – drums (2018–2021)

== Discography ==
=== Studio albums ===
Title	Album details	Peak positions	
Title	Album details	JPN Oricon	JPN Billboard
Thumb Sucker	Released: August 28, 2019 (Pre-released on July 8, 2019); Label: EMI Records; Formats: CD, digital download	9	4
Roman (浪漫)	Released: August 26, 2020; Label: EMI; Formats: CD, digital download	9	9
Gojitsu Aratamete Ukagaimasu (後日改めて伺います)	Released: November 17, 2021; Label: EMI; Formats: CD, digital download	6	8
Omomuku Mama ni I no Muku Mama ni (赴くままに、胃の向くままに)	Released: November 29, 2023; Label: EMI; Formats: CD, digital download	18	11

=== Reissues ===
Title	Album details	Peak positions	
Title	Album details	JPN Oricon	JPN Billboard
Super Zoozoosea	Released: March 6, 2020; Label: EMI; Formats: digital download	—	—
Gojitsu Aratamete Ukagaimashita (後日改めて伺いました)	Released: July 5, 2023; Label: EMI; Formats: CD, digital download	12	13

=== Extended plays ===
Title	Album details	Peak positions	
Title	Album details	JPN Oricon	JPN Billboard
Zoozoosea	Released: September 19, 2018; Label: Avex Trax; Formats: CD, digital download	10	9
Shōdō Ningen Club (衝動人間倶楽部)	Released: April 29, 2020; Label: EMI; Formats: CD, digital download	7	—
Iji to Hikari (意地と光)	Released: November 6, 2024; Label: EMI; Formats: CD, digital download	19	21

=== Singles ===
Title	Year	Peak positions	Album
Title	Year	JPN Oricon	Album
"Konaide World End" (来ないでワールドエンド)	2020	12	Roman
"Tokyo" (東京)	2021	18	Non-album singles
"Teinei na Kurashi" (丁寧な暮らし)	2021	— (Note: "Teinei na Kurashi", "Natsu", "Sasurahi", and "Roman (2023 ver.)" were released as digital singles.)	Non-album singles
"Natsu" (夏)	2021	—	Non-album singles
"Sasurahi" (さすらひ)	2021	—	Gojitsu Aratamete Ukagaimashita
"Roman (2023 ver.)" (浪漫 (2023 ver.))	2023	—	Non-album single
"Tonde Yuke" (飛んでゆけ)	2023	16	Omomuku Mama ni I no Muku Mama ni
"—" denotes a recording that did not chart or was not released in that territory.
