= Killer Bish =

Studio album by Bish
- Released: September 5, 2016 (Digital Medial), October 5, 2016 (CD)
- Genres: Punk rock; pop punk; dance-punk; alternative metal
- Length: 56:27
- Languages: Japanese, English
- Label: Avex Trax
- Producers: Kenta Matsukuma, JxSxK

Bish chronology
Fake Metal Jacket (2016)	Killer Bish (2016)	Giant Killers (2017)

Singles from Killer Bish
- 1. "Deadman" Released: May 4, 2016

Alternative covers
- Cover for LIVE Edition

Alternative cover
- Cover for Loppi & HMV Limited Edition

Killer Bish (stylized as KiLLER BiSH) is the third album by Japanese idol group Bish released through Avex Trax on October 5, 2016. The album is the first full album by the group to be released from a major label. The album is the first release to feature new member Ayuni D, who joined the group in August 2016 following the departure of Hug Mii. Unlike their independent label albums, songs from the album were not released as free downloads prior to release. However, the album was released in its entirety in digital format a month prior to the physical release. The first 24 hours of the digital release had all of the group's releases including KiLLER Bish priced at 300 yen. The album was preceded by the single "DEADMAN", released on May 4, 2016. The music video for the track "Orchestra" was posted on YouTube on September 9, followed by the video for "Hontou Honki (本当本気)" on October 5. RUKA from visual kei band Nightmare, a well known fan of Bish and BiS, provided the music for the track "IDOL is SHiT". The track title is an homage to BiS's album Idol is Dead while the track is an homage to the song "IDOL" from that album.

== Departure of Hug Mii and Entry of Ayuni D ==
Shortly after Bish had made their major label debut with the release of the single "DEADMAN", it was announced on Bish's official website on May 12 that original member Hug Mii would be leaving the group, and that their June 2 concert at Akasaka Blitz would be her last performance. New Member Ayuni D was revealed to the public on July 26, and she made her debut appearance on August 24 at the encore of their TOKYO BiSH SHiNE repetition concert at Zepp Tokyo. Ayuni D joined the LESS THAN SEX tour on September 1 in Nagoya. Ayuni D appears on the album as a full member, and Hug Mii's parts for DEADMAN have been re-recorded by Ayuni D on the album.

== Track listing ==
No.	Title	Lyrics	Music	Length
1.	"DEADMAN 2nd"	Bish & JxSxK & Kenta Matsukuma	Kenta Matsukuma	1:37
2.	"First Kitchen Life" (ファーストキッチンライフ)	Lingling	Kenta Matsukuma	2:55
3.	"Orchestra" (オーケストラ)	JxSxK & Kenta Matsukuma	Kenta Matsukuma	5:42
4.	"Stairway to me"	JxSxK & Kenta Matsukuma	Kenta Matsukuma	6:24
5.	"IDOL is SHiT"	Iku Ryukyuji	RUKA	3:55
6.	"Hontou Honki" (本当本気)	Ayuni D	Kenta Matsukuma	4:44
7.	"KNAVE"	Momoko Gumi Company & JxSxK	Kenta Matsukuma	4:54
8.	"Am I FRENZY??"	Lingling	Kenta Matsukuma	5:30
9.	"My distinction"	Lingling	Ichiro Iguchi	4:12
10.	"summertime"	Momoko Gumi Company	Kenta Matsukuma	3:05
11.	"Hey gate"	Aina the End	Kenta Matsukuma	4:07
12.	"Throw Away"	Aina the End	Kenta Matsukuma	4:07
13.	"Ikitete Yokatta to Yuu no nara" (生きててよかったというのなら)	JxSxK & Kenta Matsukuma	Kenta Matsukuma	5:15

Live Edition Disc 2: 2016.3.27 @ Shinagawa Stellarball IDOL SWINDLE TOUR FINAL DVD
No.	Title	Length
1.	"beautiful sa" (beautifulさ)
2.	"Want" (ウォント)
3.	"MONSTERS"
4.	"BUDOKAN ka Moshiku wa TAMANEGI" (BUDOKANかもしくはTAMANEGI)
5.	"Lonely girl"
6.	"NO THANK YOU"
7.	"Spark" (スパーク)
8.	"Karada Ideology" (カラダ・イデオロギー)
9.	"Is this call??"
10.	"Primitive"
11.	"SCHOOL GIRLS, BANG BANG"
12.	"HUG ME"
13.	"DA DANCE!!"
14.	"Story Brighter"
15.	"OTNK"
16.	"Dear..."
17.	"Departures" (デパーチャーズ)
18.	"Migatte I Need You" (身勝手あいにーじゅー)
19.	"TOUMIN SHOJO"
20.	"pirapiro" (ぴらぴろ)
21.	"Saraba Kana" (サラバかな)
22.	"ALL YOU NEED IS LOVE"
23.	"DEADMAN"
24.	"BiSH -Hoshi ga Matataku Yoru ni-" (BiSH -星が瞬く夜に-)
25.	"BiSH -Hoshi ga Matataku Yoru ni-" (BiSH -星が瞬く夜に-)
26.	"BiSH -Hoshi ga Matataku Yoru ni-" (BiSH -星が瞬く夜に-)
27.	"BiSH -Hoshi ga Matataku Yoru ni-" (BiSH -星が瞬く夜に-)
28.	"BiSH -Hoshi ga Matataku Yoru ni-" (BiSH -星が瞬く夜に-)
29.	"BiSH -Hoshi ga Matataku Yoru ni-" (BiSH -星が瞬く夜に-)

Loppi & HMV Limited Edition DVD
No.	Title	Length
1.	"BiSH Cannon Ball" (BiSHキャノンボール)
2.	"Orchestra (Music Video)" (オーケストラ Music Video)

== Personnel ==
- BiSH – Lyrics on Track 1
  - Centchihiro Chittiii – vocals
  - Aina the End – vocals; lyrics on Tracks 11 and 12
  - Momoko Gumi Company – vocals; lyrics on Tracks 7 and 10
  - Lingling – vocals; lyrics on Tracks 2, 8 and 9
  - Hashiyasume Atsuko – vocals
  - Ayuni D – vocals; lyrics on Track 6

== Notes ==
- All writing, arrangement and personnel credits taken from the album insert and from track previews posted on Twitter.
