= List of Oricon number-one singles of 2023 =

The following is a list of Oricon number-one singles of 2023.

== Chart history ==
Key
†	Indicates best-performing song of 2023

List of Oricon number-one singles of 2023
Issue date	Song	Artist(s)	Ref.
January 2	"Swing Swing Paradise" / "Happy Birthday to Me!"	Morning Musume '22	
January 9	"Wataridori-tachi ni Sora wa Mienai"	NGT48	
January 16	"ResQ!!"	AXXX1S	
January 23	"Hunter"	Lil League from Exile Tribe	
January 30	"The Story of Us"	KinKi Kids	
February 6	"Fearless" (Japanese version)	Le Sserafim	
February 13	"Stars"	Sandaime J Soul Brothers	
February 20	"Best Friend Ever"	NCT Dream	
February 27	"Sakurazuki"	Sakurazaka46	
March 6	"Life Goes On" / "We Are Young" †	King & Prince	
March 13	"Life Goes On" / "We Are Young" †	King & Prince	
March 20	"Special Kiss"	Naniwa Danshi	
March 27	"Tapestry" / "W"	Snow Man	
April 3	"Bye-Bye Show"	Bish	
April 10	"Hito wa Yume o Nido Miru"	Nogizaka46	
April 17	Tropical Night ("Tiger")	JO1	
April 24	"Abarero"	SixTones	
May 1	"One Choice"	Hinatazaka46	
May 8	"Dōshitemo Kimi ga Suki da"	AKB48	
May 15	"Cream"	Sexy Zone	
May 22	"Mikansei"	Kanjani Eight	
May 29	"Vivid"	Mazzel	
June 5	Drop That ("Fanfare")	INI	
June 12	"Dear My Lover" / "Uraomote"	Hey! Say! JUMP	
June 19	"Shiawase no Hana"	Johnny's West	
June 26	"Kokkara"	SixTones	
July 3	"Nanimono"	King & Prince	
July 10	"Start Over!"	Sakurazaka46	
July 17	"Suki ni Nacchatta"	SKE48	
July 24	"Stars"	B'z	
July 31	"Natsumatope"	=Love	
August 7	"Am I Ready?"	Hinatazaka46	
August 14	"Summer Riot (Nettaiya)" / "Everest"	The Rampage from Exile Tribe	
August 21	"Ōkami to Suisei"	Kanjani Eight	
August 28	"Cross"	Kazuya Kamenashi	
September 4	"Ohitorisama Tengoku"	Nogizaka46	
September 11	"Creak"	SixTones	
September 18	"Dangerholic"	Snow Man	
September 25	"Make Up Day" / "Missing"	Naniwa Danshi	
October 2	"Honne to Tatemae"	Sexy Zone	
October 9	"Idol Nanka Janakattara"	AKB48	
October 16	"Nagisa Saikō!"	NMB48	
October 23	Tag Me ("Hana")	INI	
October 30	"Shōnin Yokkyū"	Sakurazaka46	
November 6	"Zetsumei" / "Beautiful" / "As One"	West.	
November 13	"Kimito"	Lienel	
November 20	"Itoshi Ikiru Kotō" / "Magic Word"	King & Prince	
November 27	"I Wish"	Naniwa Danshi	
December 4	"Gifted"	NEWS	
December 11	"Last Note Shika Shiranai"	=Love	
December 18	"Monopoly"	Nogizaka46	
December 25	"Jinsei Yūgi"	Sexy Zone	

== See also ==
- List of Oricon number-one albums of 2023
