= List of Hot 100 number-one singles of 2023 (Japan) =

The following is a list of weekly number-one singles on the Billboard Japan Hot 100 chart in 2023.

== Chart history ==
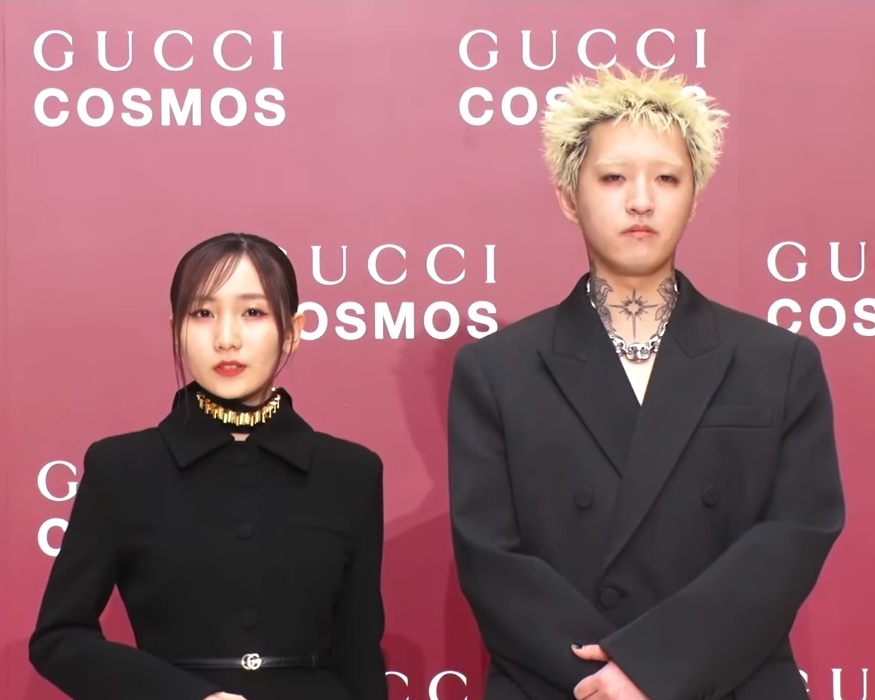
"Idol" by Yoasobi is the longest running number-one song of 2023 with 21 consecutive weeks atop the chart. It became the most both consecutive and total weeks at number one in the chart history.

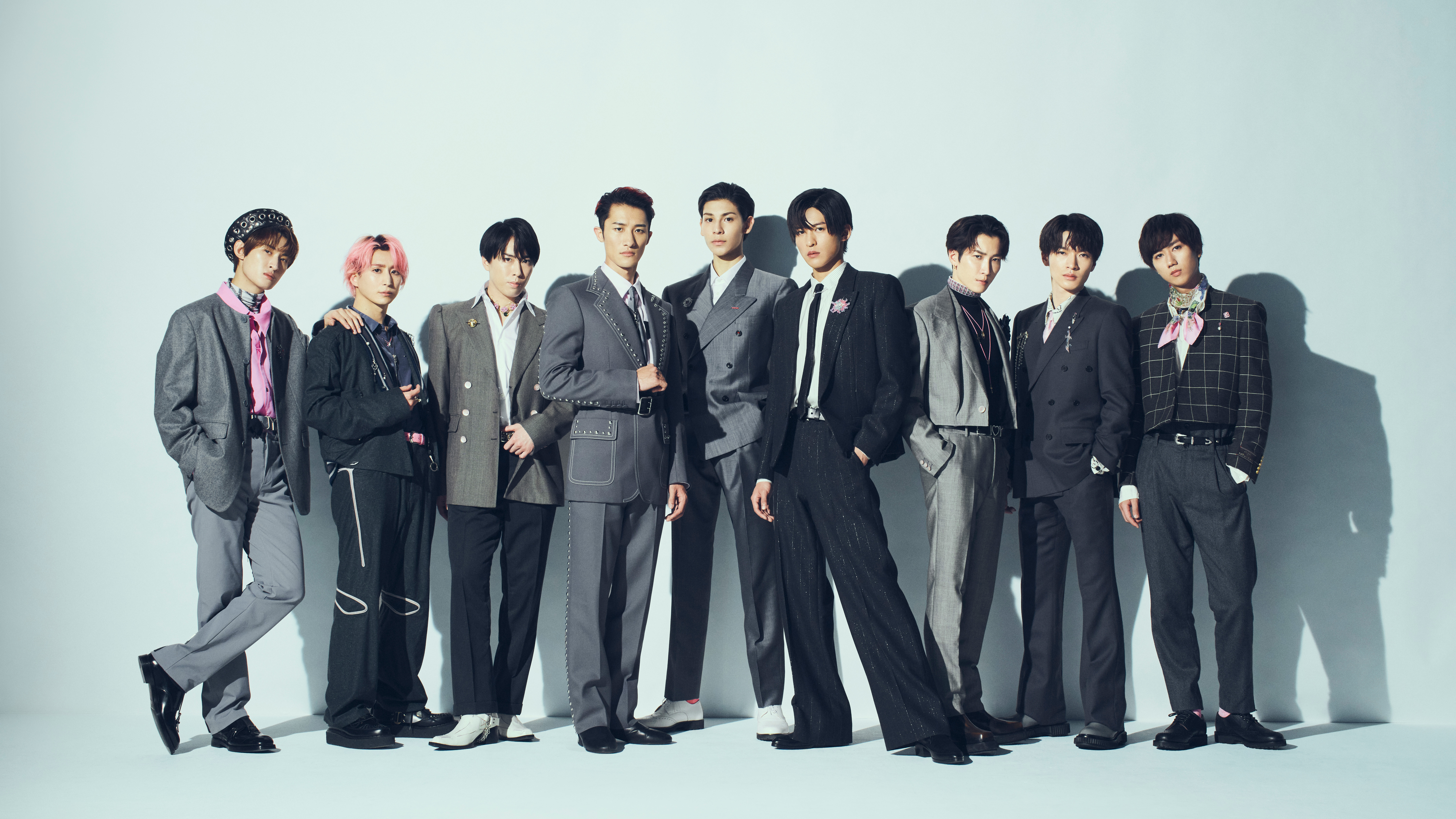
Snow Man scored their 7th and 8th number-one singles with "Tapestry" and "Dangerholic".

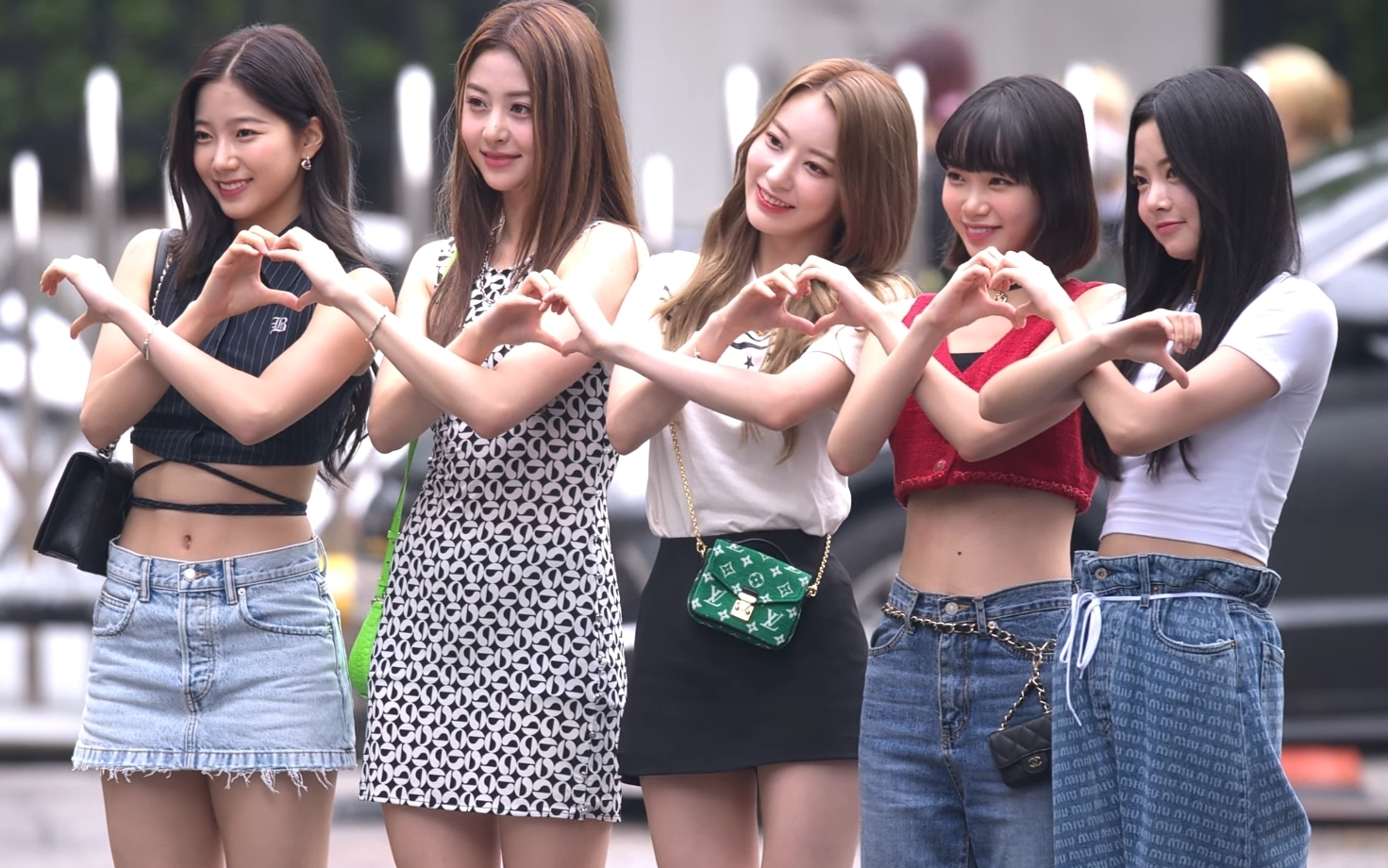
"Fearless" by South Korean girl group Le Sserafim, their debut single, topped the chart for one week.

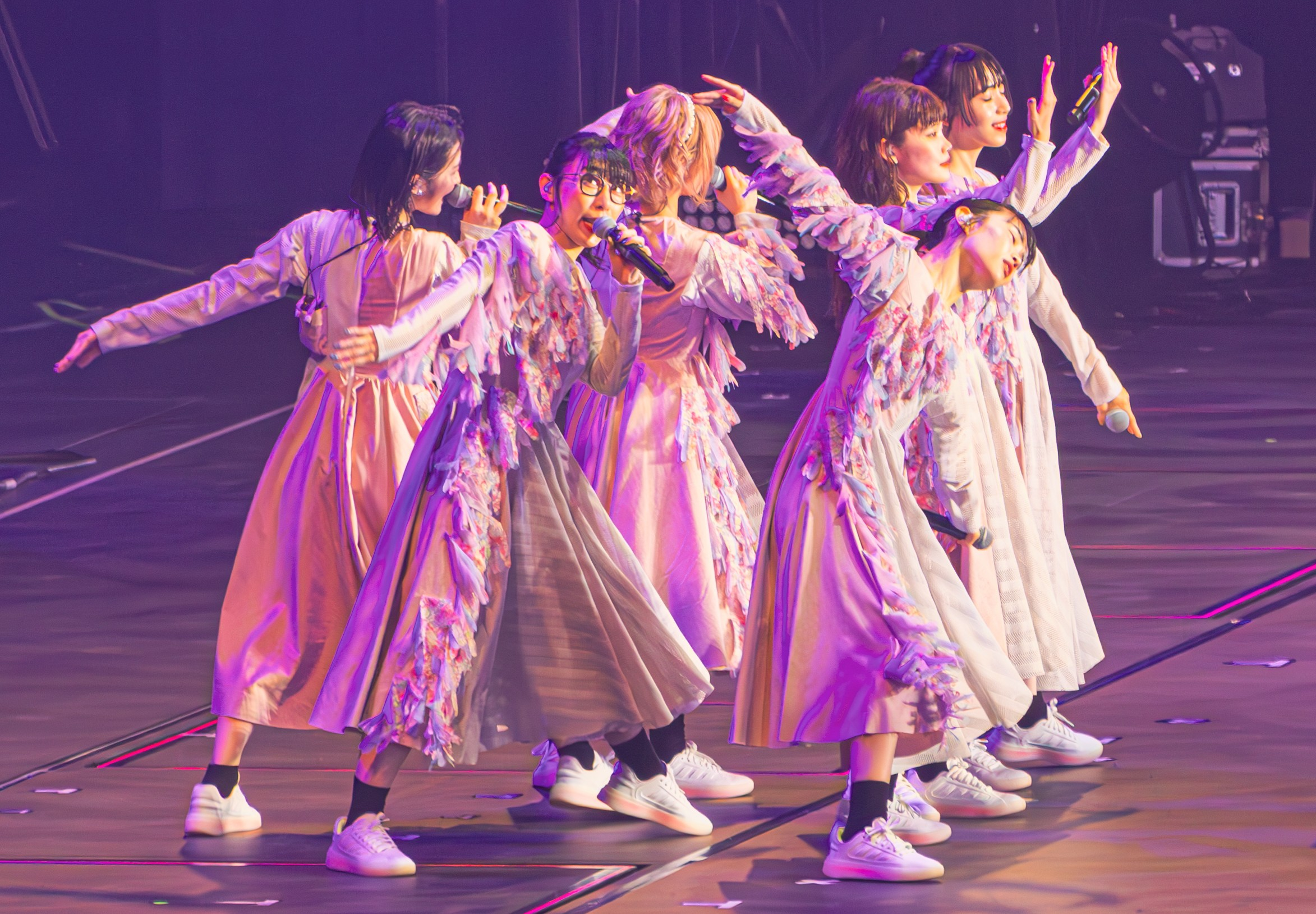
Alternative idol group Bish topped the chart with "Bye-Bye Show", their final single before disbanding.

Number-one singles of 2023 on the Japan Hot 100
Issue date	Song	Artist(s)	Ref.
January 2	"Subtitle"	Official Hige Dandism	
January 9	"Subtitle"	Official Hige Dandism	
January 16	"Subtitle"	Official Hige Dandism	
January 23	"Subtitle"	Official Hige Dandism	
January 30	"Subtitle"	Official Hige Dandism	
February 6	"Fearless"	Le Sserafim	
February 13	"Stars"	Sandaime J Soul Brothers	
February 20	"Fighting"	BSS featuring Lee Young-ji	
February 27	"Boom Boom Back"	Be First	
March 6	"Life Goes On"	King & Prince	
March 13	"Subtitle"	Official Hige Dandism	
March 20	"Paradise"	NiziU	
March 27	"Tapestry"	Snow Man	
April 3	"Bye-Bye Show"	Bish	
April 10	"Here I Stand"	Treasure	
April 17	"Tiger"	JO1	
April 24	"Idol"	Yoasobi	
May 1	"Idol"	Yoasobi	
May 8	"Idol"	Yoasobi	
May 15	"Idol"	Yoasobi	
May 22	"Idol"	Yoasobi	
May 29	"Idol"	Yoasobi	
June 5	"Idol"	Yoasobi	
June 12	"Idol"	Yoasobi	
June 19	"Idol"	Yoasobi	
June 26	"Idol"	Yoasobi	
July 3	"Idol"	Yoasobi	
July 10	"Idol"	Yoasobi	
July 17	"Idol"	Yoasobi	
July 24	"Idol"	Yoasobi	
July 31	"Idol"	Yoasobi	
August 7	"Idol"	Yoasobi	
August 14	"Idol"	Yoasobi	
August 21	"Idol"	Yoasobi	
August 28	"Idol"	Yoasobi	
September 4	"Idol"	Yoasobi	
September 11	"Idol"	Yoasobi	
September 18	"Dangerholic"	Snow Man	
September 25	"Mainstream"	Be First	
October 2	"Show"	Ado	
October 9	"Show"	Ado	
October 16	"Show"	Ado	
October 23	"Show"	Ado	
October 30	"Shōnin Yokkyū"	Sakurazaka46	
November 6	"Show"	Ado	
November 13	"Show"	Ado	
November 20	"Show"	Ado	
November 27	"Show"	Ado	
December 4	"Show"	Ado	
December 11	"Show"	Ado	
December 18	"Monopoly"	Nogizaka46	
December 25	"Show"	Ado	

== See also ==
- List of Billboard Japan Hot Albums number ones of 2023
