= I vs I =

Studio album by Wagakki Band
- Released: July 26, 2023
- Recorded: 2021–2023
- Studio: Aobadai Studio; Prime Sound Studio Form
- Genre: J-pop; heavy metal; folk rock
- Length: 46:31
- Language: Japanese
- Label: Universal Sigma

Wagakki Band chronology
| Vocalo Zanmai 2 (2022) | I vs I (2023) | All Time Best Album Thanks: Yasō no Oto (2024) |

Singles from I vs I
- 1. "Meisaku Journey" Released: November 29, 2021; 2. "The Beast" Released: July 14, 2023; 3. "Ai ni Homare" Released: July 26, 2023; 4. "Shura no Gi" Released: August 4, 2023

Music video
- I vs I all songs digest on YouTube

First Limited Grand Concert Edition cover

I vs I is the seventh studio album by Japanese band Wagakki Band. It was released on July 26, 2023, through Universal Sigma in five editions: a two-CD release with an instrumental disc, streaming, the Vocalo Zanmai 2 First Limited Grand Concert Edition with the Vocalo Zanmai 2 Tour Blu-ray, the First Limited vs Edition with bonus Baki Hanma collectibles, and the Shin Yaeryu (FC Limited) Edition box set, which combines all physical media editions with an extra DVD. I vs I is the band's first original studio release since Tokyo Singing in 2020.

The album peaked at No. 6 on Oricon's albums chart.

== Track listing ==
All tracks are arranged by Wagakki Band.

2CD (Album and instrumental discs)
| No. | Title | Writer(s) | Length |
|---|---|---|---|
| 1. | "The Beast" | Machiya | 3:12 |
| 2. | "Yoi no Hana" ((宵ノ花, "Evening Flower")) | Yuko Suzuhana | 3:32 |
| 3. | "Ai ni Homare" ((愛に誉れ, "Honor of Love")) | Suzuhana | 3:39 |
| 4. | "Seimei no Aria" ((生命のアリア, "Aria of Life")) | Machiya | 4:01 |
| 5. | "Shura no Gi" ((修羅ノ義, "Ashura's Righteousness")) | Wasabi | 3:54 |
| 6. | "Ai Yori Aoshi" ((藍より青し, "Bluer Than Indigo)) | Machiya | 3:39 |
| 7. | "Interlude ~Starlight~" | Machiya | 1:14 |
| 8. | "Starlight" (I vs I Ver.) | Machiya | 4:33 |
| 9. | "Soshite, Mahoroba" ((そして、まほろば, "And then Mahoroba")) | Suzuhana | 5:04 |
| 10. | "Toki no Hakobune" ((時の方舟, "Ark of Time")) | Machiya | 3:26 |
| 11. | "Brave" | Wasabi | 4:11 |
| 12. | "Hoshi no Gotoku" ((星の如く, "Like a Star")) | Wasabi | 4:00 |
| 13. | "Meisaku Journey" (Meisaku Jānī (名作ジャーニー, "Masterpiece Journey")) | Suzuhana; Kiyoshi Ibukuro | 2:05 |
| Total length: | | | 46:31 |

First Limited Grand Concert Edition Blu-ray: Vocalo Zanmai 2 Grand Concert (Nakano Sunplaza)
| No. | Title | Writer(s) | Length |
|---|---|---|---|
| 1. | "Overture ~Vocalo Zanmai 2 Dai Ensō-kai~" (Bokaro Zanmai 2 Dai Ensō-kai (ボカロ三昧2 大演奏会)) |
| 2. | "Phony" (Foni (フォニイ)) | Tsumiki |
| 3. | "EgoRock" (Egorokku (エゴロック)) | Surii |
| 4. | "Goodbye Sengen" (Gubbai Sengen (グッバイ宣言, "Goodbye Declaration")) | Chinozo |
| 5. | "Surges" | Orangestar |
| 6. | "Amanojaku" ((天ノ弱, "Heaven's Weakness")) | 164 |
| 7. | "Akahitoha" ((紅一葉, "One Crimson Leaf")) | Kurousa-P |
| 8. | "Identity" (Aidentiti (アイデンティティ)) | Kanaria |
| 9. | "Night of Nights" (Naito obu Naitsu (ナイト・オブ・ナイツ)) |
| 10. | "Dokuzu" (Do Kuzu (ド屑, "Trash")) | Nakiso |
| 11. | "Venom" (Benomu (ベノム)) | Kairiki Bear |
| 12. | "Ii Aru Fanclub" (Yī Èr (Ī Aru) Fankurabu (いーあるふぁんくらぶ, "1, 2 Fanclub")) | Mikito-P |
| 13. | "Drums & Wadaiko Battle: Flying Dance" (Doramu to Wadaiko Batoru ~Uchienhidō~ (ドラム和太鼓バトル〜打演飛動〜)) | Wasabi; Kurona |
| 14. | "Chimera" (Kimera (キメラ)) | Deco*27 |
| 15. | "Marshall Maximizer" (Māsharu Makishimaizā (マーシャル・マキシマイザー)) | Hiiragi Magnetite |
| 16. | "Fire Flower" | halyosy |
| 17. | "Yoshiwara Lament" (Yoshiwara Ramento (吉原ラメント)) | Asa |
| 18. | "Senbonzakura" ((千本桜, "A Thousand Sakura")) | Kurousa-P |

Shin Yaeryu (FC Limited) Edition bonus DVD
| No. | Title | Length |
|---|---|---|
| 1. | "Making of Artwork Shooting and Individual Interview Recording of Members" (Ātowāku Satsuei no Meikingu to Menbā no Kobetsu Intabyū Shūroku (アートワーク撮影のメイキングとメンバーの個別インタビュー収録)) |

== Personnel ==
- Yuko Suzuhana – vocals, piano (track 8)
- Machiya – guitar, vocals (track 1), backing vocals
- Beni Ninagawa – tsugaru shamisen
- Kiyoshi Ibukuro – koto
- Asa – bass
- Daisuke Kaminaga – shakuhachi
- Wasabi – drums
- Kurona – wadaiko, kakegoe vocals (tracks 1, 3, 4, 5, 6, 13)

(The choruses on track 11 are performed by all the members together)

== Charts ==
Chart performance for I vs I
| Chart (2023) | Peak position |
|---|---|
| Japanese Albums (Oricon) | 6 |
| Japanese Combined Albums (Oricon) | 6 |
| Japanese Hot Albums (Billboard Japan) | 5 |
