= List of Oricon number-one albums of 2023 =

The following is a list of Oricon number-one albums of 2023.

== Chart history ==
Key
†	Indicates best-performing album of 2023

List of Oricon number-one albums of 2023
Issue date	Album	Artist(s)	Ref.
January 2	Here We Go!!	Strawberry Prince	
January 9	Kessoku Band	Kessoku Band	
January 16	Koe	SixTones	
January 23	Koe	SixTones	
January 30	Humor	Back Number	
February 6	The Name Chapter: Temptation	Tomorrow X Together	
February 13	Triangle	Dish	
February 20	Showcase	Octpath	
February 27	Fantasia	KAT-TUN	
March 6	The Sound	Stray Kids	
March 13	Power	Johnny's West	
March 20	NMB13	NMB48	
March 27	Ongaku: 2nd Movement	NEWS	
April 3	Face	Jimin	
April 10	Ima no Futari o Otagai ga Miteru	Aiko	
April 17	Kimi to no Shining Days	Hoshikawa Sara	
April 24	Ninth Peel	Unison Square Garden	
May 1	Mr.5 †	King & Prince	
May 8	FML	Seventeen	
May 15	Unforgiven	Le Sserafim	
May 22	Our Parade	Gang Parade	
May 29	I Do Me	Snow Man	
June 5	Dark Blood	Enhypen	
June 12	Wave	Ive	
June 19	Chapter II	Sexy Zone	
June 26	First Howling: We	&Team	
July 3	The World EP.2: Outlaw	Ateez	
July 10	Bish the Best	Bish	
July 17	Sweet	Tomorrow X Together	
July 24	Pop Mall	Naniwa Danshi	
July 31	Coconut	NiziU	
August 7	Masterpiece	MiSaMo	
August 14	Reboot	Treasure	
August 21	NEWS Expo	NEWS	
August 28	Peace	King & Prince	
September 4	Always Yours	Seventeen	
September 11	Where	Watwing	
September 18	Social Path / Super Bowl (Japanese Ver.)	Stray Kids	
September 25	Social Path / Super Bowl (Japanese Ver.)	Stray Kids	
October 2	Equinox	JO1	
October 9	Golden Age	NCT	
October 16	Miss You	Mr. Children	
October 23	The Name Chapter: Freefall	Tomorrow X Together	
October 30	Overflow	ROF-MAO	
November 6	Seventeenth Heaven	Seventeen	
November 13	Golden	Jungkook	
November 20	Myakuutsu Kanjō	Hinatazaka46	
November 27	Rock-Star	Stray Kids	
December 4	Orange Blood	Enhypen	
December 11	The Greatest Unknown	King Gnu	
December 18	Pull Up!	Hey! Say! JUMP	
December 25	P Album	KinKi Kids	

== See also ==
- List of Oricon number-one singles of 2023
