= Soul Mate (TV series) =

2026 Japanese television series

- Promotional poster
- Katakana: ソウルメイト
- Genre: Romance drama; Boys' love
- Written by: Shunki Hashizume
- Directed by: Shunki Hashizume
- Starring: Hayato Isomura; Ok Taec-yeon
- Music by: Dalpalan
- Country of origin: Japan
- Original languages: Japanese; Korean
- No. of episodes: 8

Production
- Executive producers: Dai Ota; Lee Dong-gyu
- Producer: Koichi Murakami
- Production locations: Berlin; Seoul; Tokyo
- Running time: 33–47 minutes
- Production companies: Robot Communications; GTist

Original release
- Network: Netflix
- Release: May 14, 2026

Soul Mate (Japanese: ソウルメイト, Hepburn: Sōrumeito) is a 2026 Japanese romance boys' love television series written and directed by Shunki Hashizume. The series follows a ten-year relationship between Ryu Narutaki (Hayato Isomura) and Johan Hwang (Ok Taec-yeon) that traverses the cities of Berlin, Seoul, and Tokyo. It was released on Netflix on May 14, 2026.

== Synopsis ==
Ryu Narutaki, a young man who has left Japan, meets Korean boxer Johan Hwang. Their encounter initiates a decade-long relationship that spans Berlin, Seoul, and Tokyo. As their lives remain intertwined, they navigate personal trauma and a developing romance.

== Cast and characters ==
=== Main ===
- Hayato Isomura as Ryu Narutaki, an ice hockey player who left Japan following an accident
- Ok Taec-yeon as Johan Hwang, a Korean boxer who saved Ryu

=== Supporting ===
- Ai Hashimoto as Sumiko Shinonome, Ryu's childhood friend who moves to Germany to pursue a career as a fashion designer
- Koshi Mizukami as Arata Oikawa, Ryu's best friend and ice hockey teammate from his youth
- Yutaro Furutachi as Seiichi Aizawa, a fellow ice hockey teammate
- Lee Jae-yi as Hwang Su-ah, Johan's younger sister and sole family member, who provides him with consistent support
- Cent Chihiro Chittiii as Madoka Kadoya, a senior colleague at the nursing facility where Ryu is employed
- Ken Yasuda as Kenichi Hayakawa, the coach of the ice hockey team
- Kaho Minami as Ryu's mother
- Tomokazu Miura as Ryu's father

== Production ==
=== Development ===
Soul Mate was first announced by Netflix on June 28, 2024. The project originated from a discussion between director Shunki Hashizume and executive producer Dai Ota regarding the concept of a long-term relationship between individuals from different cultural backgrounds. According to Ota, the narrative was developed to explore the intersection of lives in foreign settings. The series is written and directed by Hashizume with production managed by Robot Communications and GTist.

=== Casting ===
Hayato Isomura and Ok Taec-yeon were confirmed in the lead roles. Isomura noted that the production's three-country filming schedule was intended to provide a global setting for the ten-year story arc while Ok joined the project to explore the character's internal struggles.

=== Filming ===
Principal photography took place across three cities: Berlin, Seoul, and Tokyo in 2024. To prepare for the role of a boxer, Ok Taec-yeon underwent a regimen of weight loss and boxing training that continued through the filming period.

== Episodes ==
No.	Title	Original release date
1	"The Gravity of Fate"; Transliteration: "Unmei no Rikigaku" (Japanese: 運命の力学)	May 14, 2026
2	"Can We Save Our Souls?"; Transliteration: "Tamashii o Mamoreru ka?" (Japanese: 魂を守れるか?)	May 14, 2026
3	"Deep in the Heart's Mirror"; Transliteration: "Kokoro no Keshiki ni Utsuru Hito" (Japanese: 心の景色に映る人)	May 14, 2026
4	"Our Sandcastle"; Transliteration: "Sajō no Futari" (Japanese: 砂上の2人)	May 14, 2026
5	"Rebirth of a Soul"; Transliteration: "Umarekawaru Tamashii" (Japanese: 生まれ変わる魂)	May 14, 2026
6	"The Galactic Railroad"; Transliteration: "Ginga Tetsudō" (Japanese: 銀河鉄道)	May 14, 2026
7	"Because of Love"; Transliteration: "Ai Yue ni" (Japanese: 愛ゆえに)	May 14, 2026
8	"Sōrumeito"; Transliteration: "Soul Mate" (Japanese: ソウルメイト)	May 14, 2026

== Release ==
Originally projected for an August 2025 release, Netflix Japan confirmed in January 2026, that the eight-episode series would premiere globally on May 14, 2026.
