= Kyrie (film) =

2023 Japanese film by Shunji Iwai

- Blu-ray cover
- Directed by: Shunji Iwai
- Screenplay by: Shunji Iwai
- Based on: Kyrie's Song by Shunji Iwai
- Starring: Aina the End; Hokuto Matsumura; Haru Kuroki; Suzu Hirose
- Cinematography: Chigi Kanbe
- Edited by: Shunji Iwai
- Music by: Takeshi Kobayashi
- Distributed by: Toei
- Release dates: October 5, 2023 (Busan); October 13, 2023 (Japan)
- Running time: 178 minutes
- Country: Japan
- Language: Japanese

Kyrie (Japanese: キリエのうた, Hepburn: Kirie no Uta; lit. "Kyrie's Song") is a 2023 Japanese film written, directed, and edited by Shunji Iwai, based on his novel of the same name. It follows a homeless and near-mute street musician. The film stars Aina the End, Hokuto Matsumura, Haru Kuroki, and Suzu Hirose. It premiered at the 28th Busan International Film Festival on October 5, 2023. The film was released in Japan on October 13, 2023.

== Plot ==
The film follows four characters over the span of 13 years. Luca, calling herself Kyrie after a 2011 tragedy, is only able to speak in a whisper unless singing. In the present day, she is homeless, busking to make ends meet, and reunites with a childhood friend, Ikko, who becomes her manager.

== Cast ==
- Aina the End as Kyrie
- Hokuto Matsumura as Natsuhiko Shiomi
- Haru Kuroki as Fumi Teraishi
- Suzu Hirose as Ikko

== Release ==
Kyrie premiered at the 28th Busan International Film Festival, screening three times between October 5–10, 2023. The film was released in Japan on October 13, 2023.

== Reception ==
Critics have praised the use of songs in the film, but have criticized its editing. Mark Schilling of The Japan Times noted that enjoyment of the film would depend on the audience's attitude towards the ballads Aina the End sings. Schilling concludes that Iwai's directing follows a vision that contains "swirling visual energy and beauty uniquely his own", but does so at the expense of logic or realism. James Marsh of the South China Morning Post said that the theatrical version of the film being an hour shorter than the three-hour version played at festivals made it feel like large gaps in backstory were missing. Marsh also found the film's mixed chronology, as well as Aina's dual roles, to be confusing. While the film's songs were short, Marsh felt them to be a good showcase for Aina's husky vocals. Marsh concludes that the film is a "fragmented and frustrating experience". Wendy Ide of Screen Daily complimented Aina's singing, but did not find her acting to be convincing.
