= Ayuni D =

Japanese singer

- Ayuni D in 2023

Background information
- Born: Ayuko Itō (伊藤亜佑子); October 12, 1999 (age 26)
- Origin: Sapporo, Japan
- Genres: Pop, Rock
- Occupations: Singer, bassist
- Years active: 2016–present
- Labels: WACK, Roman Planet
- Member of: Pedro
- Formerly of: Bish

Ayuni D (アユニ・D), stylized as AYUNi D, born on October 12, 1999, is a Japanese singer, member of Japanese rock band Pedro and former member of Japanese girl group Bish. She debuted as a solo artist under the name Aomushi in November 2021.

== History ==
On August 1, 2016, Ayuni was announced as a new member of Bish. Her first album with the group, Killer Bish was released later that year. In 2017, she joined WACK's first shuffle unit Saint Sex as a member alongside fellow Bish member Aina the End. In September 2018, Ayuni debuted as a member of Pedro. In February 2019, Ayuni joined WACK's third shuffle unit Bully Idol as a member. In October 2021, it was announced that Ayuni would debut as a solo artist under the name Aomushi (青虫). Her debut EP, 103-gō (103号), was released on November 3. Pedro went on hiatus at the end of 2021. After Bish's disbandment in June 2023, Pedro resumed activities.

== Discography ==
=== Extended plays ===
Title	Album details	Peak positions	
Title	Album details	JPN Oricon	JPN Billboard
103-gō (103号)	Released: November 3, 2021; Label: Universal Music Japan; Formats: CD, digital download	16	—
