= Paint It Black (Bish song) =

Single by Bish

from the album Carrots and Sticks
- B-side: "Schoolyard"
- Released: March 28, 2018
- Genre: J-pop, rock
- Length: 8:47
- Label: Avex Trax
- Composer: Kenta Matsukuma
- Lyricist: Beat mint boyz

Bish singles chronology
"Promise the Star" (2017)	"Paint It Black" (2018)	"Non Tie-Up" (2018)

Music video
- "Paint It Black" on YouTube

"Paint It Black" (stylized as "PAiNT it BLACK") is the fourth single by the Japanese girl group Bish, released on March 28, 2018, by Avex Trax. The song was used as the second opening theme song for the Black Clover anime television series. The single sold 39,000 copies in its first week of release and topped the Oricon Singles Chart.

== Music video ==
The music video for "Paint It Black" was released on March 23, 2018, directed by Spikey John.

== Track listing ==
CD

No.	Title	Lyrics	Music	Length
1.	"Paint It Black"	Beat mints boyz	Kenta Matsukuma	3:51
2.	"Schoolyard"	Beat mints boyz	Kenta Matsukuma	4:55
Total length:				8:47

== Charts ==
Chart (2018)	Peak position
Oricon Singles Chart (Oricon)	1
Japan Hot 100 (Billboard)	3
