= Kakumei Dōchū =

Single by Aina the End
- Language: Japanese
- English title: "On the Way"
- Released: July 2, 2025
- Genre: J-pop
- Length: 3:17
- Label: Avex Trax
- Songwriters: Aina the End; Shin Sakiura

Aina the End singles chronology
"Aria" (2025)	"Kakumei Dōchū" (2025)	"Gakeppuchi Ruby" (2026)

Music video
- Video on YouTube

"Kakumei Dōchū" (革命道中; lit. 'On the way to revolution'), also known as "On the Way", is a song by Japanese singer Aina the End. It was released through Avex Trax on July 2, 2025, serving as the opening theme for the second season of the Japanese anime series Dandadan.

== Background ==
Aina the End released the song on July 2, 2025. The song was written specifically for the series. In an interview, Aina the End said she "wanted to represent their strange love story" in the song. It was also produced by Shin Sakiura.

On August 20, a music video featuring moments from the anime Dandadan appeared on Aina the End's official YouTube channel.

== Music video ==
The official music video was released on July 3, 2025. Directed by Yuki Tsujimoto, It features a world with both yōkai and humans.

== Live performances ==
On September 6, 2025, Aina the End staged a surprise guerrilla concert, where she performed "Kakumei Dōchū" in Shinjuku.

== Accolades ==
Awards and nominations for "Kakumei Dōchū"
Ceremony	Year	Award	Result	Ref.
AnimaniA Awards	2026	Best Anime Song	Nominated	
Crunchyroll Anime Awards	2026	Best Anime Song	Nominated	
Crunchyroll Anime Awards	2026	Best Opening Sequence	Won	
Japan Expo Awards	2026	Daruma for Best Opening	Won	
Japan Record Awards	2025	Excellent Work Awards	Won	
MTV Video Music Awards Japan	2026	Video of the Year	Nominated	
MTV Video Music Awards Japan	2026	Best Solo Artist Video (Japan)	Won	
Music Awards Japan	2026	Song of the Year	Nominated	
Music Awards Japan	2026	Best J-Pop Song	Nominated	
Music Awards Japan	2026	Best Anime Song	Nominated	
Music Awards Japan	2026	Top Japanese Song in Asia	Nominated	
Music Awards Japan	2026	Top Japanese Song in Europe	Nominated	
Music Awards Japan	2026	Top Japanese Song in Latin America	Nominated	
Music Awards Japan	2026	Best Music Video	Nominated	
Music Awards Japan	2026	Best Cover Artwork	Nominated	
Reiwa Anisong Awards	2026	Lyrics Award (Note: Aina the End and Shin Sakiura credited as nominees.)	Nominated	
Reiwa Anisong Awards	2026	Anikara Award	Nominated	

== Charts ==
=== Weekly charts ===
Weekly chart performance for "Kakumei Dōchū"
Chart (2025)	Peak position
Global 200 (Billboard)	165
Japan (Japan Hot 100)	4
Japan Hot Animation (Billboard Japan)	1
Japan (Oricon)	18
Japan Combined Singles (Oricon)	8
Japan Anime Singles (Oricon)	8
Japan Osakan Hot 100 (FM802)	3
US World Digital Song Sales (Billboard)	9

=== Year-end charts ===
Year-end chart performance for "Kakumei Dōchū"
Chart (2025)	Position
Japan (Japan Hot 100)	35
Japan Hot Animation (Billboard Japan)	9
Japan Osakan Yearly Chart Hot 100 (FM802)	4

== Certifications ==
Certifications for "Kakumei Dōchū"
Region	Certification	Certified units/sales
Japan (RIAJ) Digital	Gold	100,000^{*}
Streaming
Japan (RIAJ)	2× Platinum	200,000,000^{†}
^{†} Streaming-only figures based on certification alone.
