= Wave (Ive EP) =

- Digital cover

EP by Ive
- Released: May 31, 2023
- Genre: J-pop
- Length: 15:49
- Languages: Japanese; English
- Labels: Starship; Ariola Japan

Ive chronology
I've Ive (2023)	Wave (2023)	I've Mine (2023)

Singles from Wave
- 1. "Love Dive (Japanese ver.)" Released: January 16, 2023; 2. "Wave" Released: May 9, 2023

Wave is the first Japanese extended play (EP) by South Korean girl group Ive. It was released on May 31, 2023, by Starship Entertainment and Ariola Japan. The EP contains 5 tracks, including the lead single of the same name, Japanese versions of the group's Korean singles "After Like" and "Love Dive" and one new original Japanese song, "Classic". The EP topped the charts in Japan, debuting at number one on the Oricon Albums Chart and the Billboard Japan Hot Album.

== Background and composition ==
On April 1, Ive announced the first Japanese extended play would be released on May 31, including the lead single "Wave", a B-side track "Classic", and the Japanese version of their previously released songs: "After Like", "Love Dive", and Take It". The music video for lead single "Wave" was pre-released on May 9, 2023. "Wave", is a song that explores the idea that having confidence in certainty holds advantages over ambiguous relationships in matters of love. The song is characterized by attractive bass and addictive chorus.

== Promotion ==
Ive appeared on Music Station, a Japanese music television program, they also appeared on different local broadcasting programs in Japan and performed their title track, "Wave" on stage.

== Commercial performance ==
Within Japan, the EP was commercially successful, with it debuting at number 1 on the Oricon Albums Chart. The album was in first place for seven days in a row on the Oricon Daily Album Chart. It also debuted at number 1 on the Billboard Japan Hot Album. In addition, it was certified gold by the Recording Industry Association of Japan (RIAJ).

== Track listing ==
Wave track listing
No.	Title	Lyrics	Music	Arrangement	Length
1.	"Wave"	Hiromi	Ryan S. Jhun; Gustav Landell; Simon Jonasson; Kristin Carpenter; Pateko; Stally	Ryan S. Jhun; Gustav Landell; Simon Jonasson; Pateko; Stally	2:55
2.	"Classic"	Kanata Okajima	Ryan S. Jhun; Chloe Anne Latimer; Nina Nesbitt; Celine Svanbäck; Jeppe London Bilsby	Ryan S. Jhun; Jeppe London Bilsby	3:32
3.	"After Like" (Japanese version)	Ryan S. Jhun; Anders Nilsen; Eill	Ryan S. Jhun; Anders Nilsen; André Jensen	Ryan S. Jhun; Anders Nilsen	2:58
4.	"Love Dive" (Japanese version)	Seo Ji-eum; Kanata Okajima	Sophia Brennan; Elle Campbell; Nick Hahn	Nick Hahn	2:57
5.	"Take It" (Japanese version)	Eill	Daniel Kim; Jeremy G (Future Sound); Willie Weeks	Willie Weeks	3:25
Total length:					15:49

== Charts ==
=== Weekly charts ===
Weekly chart performance for Wave
Chart (2023)	Peak position
Japanese Albums (Oricon)	1
Japanese Combined Albums (Oricon)	1
Japanese Hot Albums (Billboard Japan)	1

=== Monthly charts ===
Monthly chart performance for Wave
Chart (2023)	Position
Japanese Albums (Oricon)	3

=== Year-end charts ===
Year-end chart performance for Wave
Chart (2023)	Position
Japanese Albums (Oricon)	39
Japanese Hot Albums (Billboard Japan)	34

== Certifications ==
Certifications for Wave
Region	Certification	Certified units/sales
Japan (RIAJ)	Gold	100,000^{^}
^{^} Shipments figures based on certification alone.

== Release history ==
Release history for Wave
Region	Date	Format	Label
Japan	May 31, 2023	CD	Ariola Japan
Various	May 31, 2023	Digital download; streaming	Starship

== See also ==
- List of Oricon number-one albums of 2023
- List of Billboard Japan Hot Albums number ones of 2023
