= Orangestar =

Japanese musician (born 1997)

- Born: August 20, 1997 (age 29)
- Origin: Sendai, Japan
- Genres: Pop music, J-pop
- Instruments: Piano
- Years active: 2013–2017; 2020–present
- Labels: U&R
- Website: d-ue.jp/orangestar

Orangestar is a Japanese Vocaloid music producer and composer. He began uploading songs to Niconico in 2013. In 2015, he released his first album Unfinished Eight Beats at the age of 17, which topped at rank 45 in Japan according to Oricon's weekly charts. Orangestar stopped his musical activities for about two years starting from 2017 due to his missionary responsibilities as a Mormon and became active again in 2020. Later that year, he married illustrator Kase (ja:夏背).

== Biography ==
Orangestar was born in Japan into a Christian household. He started going to church at an early age. His father suggested that he learn to play the piano. Orangestar did not like it much, but continued playing until he graduated from middle school. He then went to Tsudanuma High School, a music high school in Chiba, for a year. During his one year of high school, he got to know Vocaloid music through his friends, while his father bought him DAW software, including Cubase. After hearing music made by Vocaloid producers such as 40mP and Deco*27, Orangestar wanted to make his own songs heard as well. He uploaded his first song "Noraboku" (ノラボク) during spring break in April 2013 on Niconico using the handle "Orangestar".

During the summer of 2013, Orangestar met M.B, a game illustrator who also goes to The Church of Jesus Christ of Latter-day Saints. This encounter started a years-long partnership between them, beginning with M.B drawing the artwork for "Mikansei Time Limiter", a song published in February 2014.

In April 2014, Orangestar left his Japanese high school and moved to Utah with his family in order to study English.

During the summer of 2014, Orangestar posted "Earphones and a Chorus of Cicadas" (イヤホンと蝉時雨, Iyahon to Semishigure) and "Night Sky Patrol of Tomorrow" (ja:アスノヨゾラ哨戒班, Asu no Yozora Shōkaihan), both of which gained attention. Orangestar being a high school musician also became a hot topic.

In April 2015, Orangestar released his first album Unfinished Eight Beats (ja:未完成エイトビーツ, Mikansei Eito Bītsu), which ranked 45th in Japan on Oricon's weekly chart. He was 17 years old at the time.

In 2016, in addition to publishing several songs online, Orangestar composed "Imagined Mirage" (心象蜃気楼, Shinshō Shinkirō) for Chunithm, an arcade rhythm game.

Orangestar's second album, Seaside Soliloquies, was released on January 18, 2017. The album ranked 26 on Oricon's weekly chart.

Snow Miku, a Vocaloid themed annual festival, took place in February 2017 featuring "Star Night Snow" by n-buna, another Vocaloid producer, and Orangestar. This is their first collaboration, though they have listened to each other's songs and known each other for a long time. Their names often appeared side by side because they were both teenagers and both produced summer-themed songs.

In April 2017, Orangestar hosted his first live in Ueno Otoyokochō (上野音横丁), a live house in Taitō City.

In August 2017, after releasing the song "Good Weather" (快晴, Kaisei) as a part of Hatsune Miku's 10-year anniversary album Re:Start, Orangestar stopped his musical activities and moved to Riverside, California to become a Mormon missionary. Two years of silence followed. At the end of 2019, Orangestar announced his return to music production and released "Sunflower" featuring Kase in April 2020.

In December 2020, Orangestar and illustrator Kase announced on Twitter that they had gotten married. Kase had written the lyrics, drawn the illustration, and sung the vocals for Orangestar's April 2020 song "Sunflower". She will continue to play a role in Orangestar's songs after their marriage.

Besides continued online presence, Orangestar has written songs for rhythm games, anime, and promotional videos. The mobile rhythm game Hatsune Miku: Colorful Stage! commissioned Orangestar to write an original for the mobile game, resulting in the creation of "Awaiting Clear Skies" (霽れを待つ, Hare o Matsu). "Overseas Highway" (オーバーシーズ・ハイウェイ, Ōbāshīzu Haiwei), composed by Orangestar and sung by Wolpis Carter, was selected to be the ending theme song of Digimon Adventure:, a 2020 anime belonging to the Digimon series. This was the first time Orangestar wrote a song for an anime; he claimed that he watched the first Digimon as a child and thus felt strange writing the theme song for the series. Orangestar also wrote the song "Surges" for a 2021 promotional video of CalorieMate, an energy bar brand made by Otsuka Pharmaceutical. The video depicts student athletes' practice interrupted by COVID-19 and eventually resuming with explosive heat in the summer. Orangestar's wife Kase was one of the vocalists in the song.

In August 2022, Orangestar held his second live titled "UNDEFINED SUMMER-NOISE" in Tokyo Garden Theater in Tokyo. Orangestar himself and his wife Kase hosted the live.

In July 2024, he hosted a one-man live "And So Henceforth" at Aichi Prefecture Arts Theater, Orix Theater, and FINAL at Tokyo Garden Theater. A live CD containing 4 songs was also sold as merchandise for the final live.

== Artistry ==
The username "Orangestar" comes from "Mikansei (蜜柑星)", a wordplay on "mikansei (未完成)", meaning "incomplete". "蜜柑" means mandarin or orange, while "星" means star.

Orangestar's music heavily features summer; he was born in the summer and loved the summer in Japan. Many of his songs included elements from Japan's summer, such as cicadas, though they were composed in the United States. Orangestar claimed that residing in the United States gave him a clearer understanding of the summer in Japan. Besides summer, other recurring themes in Orangestar's lyrics include pianos, stars, seas, melancholy, and loneliness.

Orangestar most frequently uses the voicebank IA, as opposed to more popular ones such as Hatsune Miku. He prefers IA because it was the first one he bought and because he likes the sense of transparency in her voice. He usually features simple tones and musical arrangements and most frequently uses pianos and synthesizers, though guitars sometimes make an appearance in his songs as well. One of his claims is that he has subtly and unintentionally expressed Christian values in his lyrics. These ideas were taught at church and have since been ingrained in him. M.B, his usual illustrator who is also Mormon, expressed similar sentiments: the clothing of his characters might be unconsciously Christian as well.

Orangestar likes anime as a form of expression accompanying his songs. He has expressed his love of the anime Bakemonogatari and Nagi-Asu: A Lull in the Sea.

== Influence ==
Besides ranking 26th and 45th place on Oricon's weekly sales chart, Orangestar's songs are featured on Billboard Japan's 2022 UGC songs chart, which ranks user-generated songs on YouTube. Both "Henceforth" and "Night Sky Patrol of Tomorrow" reached top 10 in the list, despite the latter song being posted in 2014.

Orangestar's works have been covered by many artists. For example, "Night Sky Patrol of Tomorrow" was covered by VTuber HIMEHINA in their first cover album and by singer Yuaru in her 5-year anniversary music video. It was also included in mobile rhythm games BanG Dream! Girls Band Party! and Hatsune Miku: Colorful Stage!. These two games have also added Orangestar's "DAYBREAK FRONTLINE" into their list of playable songs.

== Discography ==
List of Orangestar albums, with selected details and chart positions
Title	Details	Peak chart position
Unfinished Eight Beats (未完成エイトビーツ)	Released: April 22, 2015; Label: Subcul-rise	45
未収録OSC	Released: January 8, 2017; Label: U&R	–
Seaside Soliloquies	Released: January 18, 2017; Label: U&R	26
Light in the Distance	Released: April 27, 2022; The vocals are by Orangestar's wife Kase	–
And So Henceforth,	Released: August 30, 2023; Label: Pony Canyon	9
