= Bye-Bye Show =

Single by Bish
- B-side: "Spark"
- Released: March 22, 2023
- Genre: J-pop, rock
- Length: 8:50
- Label: Avex Trax

Bish singles chronology
"Zutto" (2022)	"Bye-Bye Show" (2023)

Music video
- "Bye-Bye Show" on YouTube

"Bye-Bye Show" is the twenty-first and final single by the Japanese girl group Bish, released on March 22, 2023, by Avex Trax. The single sold 138,000 copies in its first week of release and topped the Oricon Singles Chart and Japan Hot 100.

== Music and lyrics ==
"Bye-Bye Show" features all four members of The Yellow Monkey and was written, composed and produced by vocalist Kazuya Yoshii. The B-side, "Spark", is a cover of the 1996 song by The Yellow Monkey.

== Music video ==
The music video for "Bye-Bye Show" was released on February 20, 2023, directed by Kento Yamada, Elizabeth Miyaji and Junnosuke Watanabe, Bish's manager.

== Track listing ==
All lyrics and music by Kazuya Yoshii.

CD single
No.	Title	Length
1.	"Bye-Bye Show"	4:41
2.	"Spark"	4:08
Total length:		8:50

== Charts ==
=== Weekly charts ===
Weekly chart performance for "Bye-Bye Show"
Chart (2023)	Peak position
Japan (Japan Hot 100)	1
Japan (Oricon)	1
Japan Combined Singles (Oricon)	1

=== Monthly charts ===
Monthly chart performance for "Bye-Bye Show"
Chart (2023)	Position
Japan (Oricon)	7

=== Year-end charts ===
Year-end chart performance for "Bye-Bye Show"
Chart (2023)	Position
Japan Top Singles Sales (Billboard Japan)	37

== Certifications ==
Certifications and sales for "Bye-Bye Show"
Region	Certification	Certified units/sales
Japan (RIAJ)	Platinum	250,000^{^}
^{^} Shipments figures based on certification alone.
