= Bish (group) =

Japanese idol group

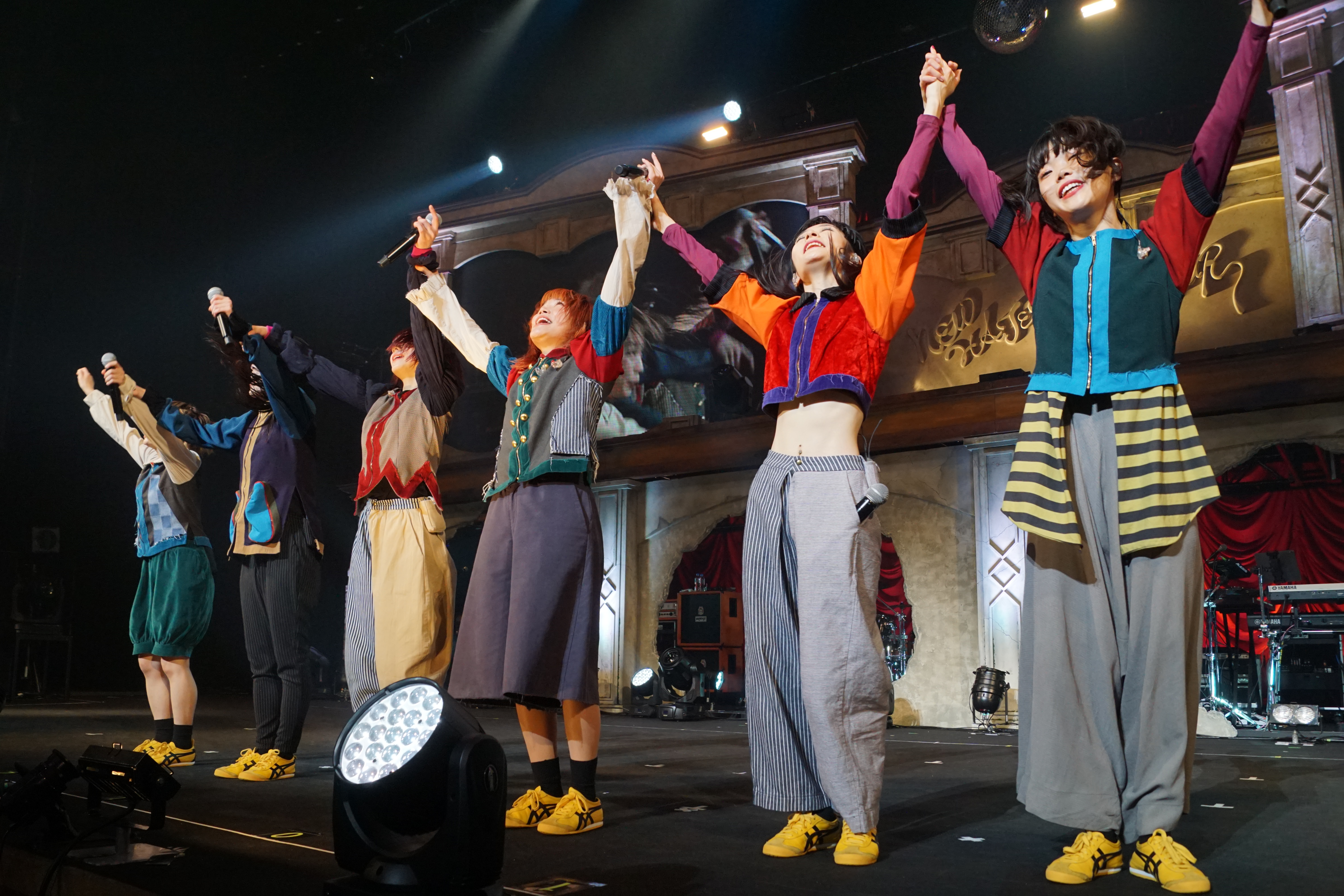
- Bish performing in 2019

Background information
- Origin: Japan
- Genres: Alternative rock; punk rock; pop punk; dance-punk; alternative metal
- Years active: 2015–2023
- Labels: WACK; Sub Trax; Avex Trax
- Spinoff of: Bis
- Past members: Aina the End; Centchihiro Chittiii; Momoko Gumi Company; Lingling; Hashiyasume Atsuko; Ayuni D; Yukako Love Deluxe; Hug Mii
- Website: www.bish.tokyo

Bish, stylized as BiSH, was a Japanese alternative idol girl group founded in 2015 by their manager Junnosuke Watanabe. The group was conceived as a successor to Bis, an idol group managed by Watanabe that disbanded in 2014. They disbanded in June 2023.

== History ==
=== 2015: Formation and debut ===
Bish was initially announced in January 2015 with the idea to begin Bis again, and auditions began that month in order to find members. After the audition process, the completed lineup was announced in March, and members Yukako Love Deluxe, Centchihiro Chittiii, Aina the End, Hug Mii, and Momoko Gumi Company were revealed to the public. The members' eyes were obscured with black contact lenses and could not be revealed until they each attained 4,444 followers on Twitter.

Their first song "Spark", from the album Brand-New Idol Shit, was released through the music site Ototoy as a free download: first as a demo version with vocals by their manager, then the finished version was released one week later. At that time, Yukako Love Deluxe chose to withdraw from the group before their official debut. In an interview with Ototoy, she cited reasons of stress and anxiety in relation to her withdrawal. She had recorded vocals for all tracks on the album, so her parts had to be re-recorded before its release. Her voice was retained, however, on "Spark".

Bish released a music video for the song "Bish - Hoshi ga Matataku Yoru ni" in April. As the release of the album drew closer, Bish began to release more of its songs as free downloads. By 21 May, just six days before its official release date, all 13 of the album tracks were available for free.

On 31 May, Bish held their first solo concert, "This is for Bis", at Nakano Heavy Sick Zero. Though venue's capacity was merely 80 people, it was chosen for its significance, being the venue where Bis' first one-man was held. During the show, the members announced an audition to recruit more members, and a single to be released in September.

In August, Bish performed at the 2015 Tokyo Idol Festival. However, due to their fans and fans of their sister group POP (Period of Plastic 2 Mercy) failing to follow the rules of the festival during the groups' performances, both groups had all events on the second day cancelled. Footage from the festival was broadcast on TV shows showing festival staff attempting to bring Bish's performance to a halt in the middle of a song.

On 5 August, two new Bish members were revealed: Lingling and Hashiyasume Atsuko, bringing the total number of members up to six. Just as the earlier members of the group, their profile photos were taken with black contact lenses. Their true faces could not be revealed until they gained more Twitter followers than Bish manager Junnosuke Watanabe. However, Watanabe got bored of waiting and lowered the number to 5000 followers for both members, and their faces were revealed later that week. On 14 August 2015, Bish revealed the music video for their first single, the Celtic metal song "OTNK", featuring the new members, the single was released on September 2. On 26 August, Bish held the concert "Tokyo Bish Shine" at Zepp Tokyo, where Lingling and Hashiyasume Atsuko make their live debut.

=== 2016–2017: Major label debut ===
On 2 October 2015, it was announced that Bish would release a second album with the title Full Metal Jacket. This was later changed to Fake Metal Jacket, and was released on 20 January 2016. Fake Metal Jacket was promoted with a music video for the song "Monsters", which originally appeared on their first album.

On 19 January 2016, Bish announced at the final leg of their "Idol Is Shit" tour that they would have their major debut through the label Avex Trax in May 2016.

The group released the hardcore punk song "Deadman" as their major-label debut single on 5 May, billing the 99-second number as "(Probably) the shortest major debut song ever?!" The coupling track "Earth" was composed by Tetsuya Komuro and the release was mastered by Tim Young. Shortly after the singles' release, Bish announced the release of their major-label debut album in October 2016.

On 16 May 2016, member Hug Mii announced her withdrawal from Bish, citing family reasons as the cause. Her last performance was on 2 June.

On 1 August 2016, new member Ayuni D was revealed to the public. She made her debut with the group at the "Tokyo Bish Shine Repetition" event on 24 August, where they announced the title of their upcoming October album, Killer Bish.

Aina the End, the lead vocalist of the group, underwent surgery for vocal polyps at the end of 2016, which meant the group ended their activities for the year with the free concert "In The End". She returned in 2017, and Bish announced their single "Promise the Star" would be released in March.

Bish released their first mini-album, Giant Killers, on 28 June, featuring title track "Giant Killers" and "Shakai no Rule", the theme song for cartoon Heybot!, with lyrics written by Hashiyasume Atsuko. Certain editions of the album contain "Introducing Bish", a twelve-track compilation CD featuring new recordings of past Bish songs featuring vocals by Ayuni D.

On 4 November 2017, Bish had a surprise release of their second major-label album, The Guerrilla Bish, exclusively through Tower Records. The album was released at a price of ¥299 without any prior advertising, and the surprise edition is packaged without cover art or a lyrics booklet, a reference to Kanye West's sixth album Yeezus. The music video for the lead song "My landscape" was filmed at the Mojave Air and Space Port's airplane graveyard in California, as was the photography for the album cover.

=== 2018–2020: Domestic breakthrough ===
On 28 March 2018, Bish released the single "Paint It Black". The song was used as the second opening theme for the anime series Black Clover and topped the Oricon Singles Chart. On 27 June, they released the double A-side single "Life is Beautiful / Hide the Blue" as well as the single "Non Tie-Up". The single "Stereo Future" was released on December 5 and was used as the theme song for God Eater 3.

On 3 July 2019, Bish released the single "More Than Like", which was used as the fourth and final opening theme of Fairy Tail's final season. Their third major album, Carrots and Sticks, was released on 3 July. The double A-side single "Kind People / Rhythm" was released on 6 November.

On 22 July 2020, the album Letters was released, considered the band's "major 3.5th" album, containing 7 tracks. It peaked at 1st place on the Oricon Albums Chart.

=== 2021–2023: Monthly singles and disbandment ===
On 4 August 2021, the album Going to Destruction was released.

On 24 December 2021, Bish announced that they will disband in 2023.

In 2022, Bish released a new single every month, starting with "Final Shits" and ending with "Zutto". The song "innocent arrogance" from the album "BiSH the Best" was used as the opening theme of the anime adaptation of Masakazu Ishiguro's manga Heavenly Delusion.

On 8 February 2023, Bish announced that they had established Bish Co., Ltd. and audition project Bish The Next, with the purpose of producing their successor group.

Bish's final single, "Bye-Bye Show", was released on March 22. It features all four members of the rock band The Yellow Monkey; vocalist Kazuya Yoshii wrote and produced it, while the band's three instrumentalists performed the track. Additionally, the single's B-side is a cover of The Yellow Monkey's 1996 song "Spark".

Bish disbanded on 29 June 2023, at their final concert which was held at Tokyo Dome.

== Members ==
=== Final line-up ===
- Aina the End (アイナ・ジ・エンド)
- Centchihiro Chittiii (セントチヒロ・チッチ)
- Momoko Gumi Company (モモコグミカンパニー )
- Lingling (リンリン)
- Hashiyasume Atsuko (ハシヤスメ・アツコ)
- Ayuni D (アユニ・D)

=== Former ===
- Yukako Love Deluxe (ユカコラブデラックス)
- Hug Mii (ハグ・ミィ)

== Discography ==
Bish discography
- Studio albums: 7
- EPs: 3
- Compilation albums: 2
- Singles: 21

=== Studio albums ===
Title	Album details	Peak positions	
Title	Album details	JPN Oricon	JPN Billboard
Brand-new idol Shit	Released: 27 May 2015; Label: Sub Trax; Formats: CD, digital download	20	26
Fake Metal Jacket	Released: 20 January 2016; Label: Sub Trax; Formats: CD, digital download	13	13
Killer Bish	Released: 5 October 2016; Label: Avex Trax; Formats: CD, digital download	7	8
The Guerrilla Bish	Released: 29 November 2017; Label: Avex Trax; Formats: CD, digital download	5	6
Carrots and Sticks	Released: 3 July 2019; Label: Avex Trax; Formats: CD, digital download	4	4
Letters	Released: 22 July 2020; Label: Avex Trax; Formats: CD, digital download	1	1
Going to Destruction	Released: 4 August 2021; Label: Avex Trax; Formats: CD, digital download	1	1

=== Compilation albums ===
Title	Album details	Peak positions	
Title	Album details	JPN Oricon	JPN Billboard
For Live -Bish Best-	Released: 8 July 2020; Label: Avex Trax; Formats: CD	1	2
Bish the Best	Released: 28 June 2023; Label: Avex Trax; Formats: CD	1	1

=== Live albums ===
Title	Album details
Tokyo Bish Shine6 (Live at Zepp Tokyo 2020.8.19)	Released: 16 October 2020; Label: Avex Trax; Formats: digital download

=== Extended plays ===
Title	Album details	Peak positions	
Title	Album details	JPN Oricon	JPN Billboard
Giant Killers	Released: 28 June 2017; Label: Avex Trax; Formats: CD, digital download	4	4
Sticks	Released: 3 April 2019; Label: Avex Trax; Formats: digital download	—	—
Carrots	Released: 3 May 2019; Label: Avex Trax; Formats: digital download	—	—

=== Singles ===
==== As lead artist ====
Title	Year	Peak chart positions		Certifications	Album
Title	Year	JPN Oricon	JPN Billboard	Certifications	Album
"OTNK"	2015	10	34		Fake Metal Jacket
"Deadman"	2016	5	16		Killer Bish
"Promise the Star" (プロミスザスター)	2017	4	9		The Guerrilla Bish
"Paint It Black"	2018	1	3		Carrots and Sticks
"Non Tie-Up"	2018	12	29		Carrots and Sticks
"Life is Beautiful"	2018	3	5		Carrots and Sticks
"Hide the Blue"	2018	3	—		Carrots and Sticks
"Stereo Future"	2018	4	4		Carrots and Sticks
"Small Fish"	2019	—N/a	—		Carrots and Sticks
"Futari Nara" (二人なら)	2019	—N/a	—		Carrots and Sticks
"Kind People"	2019	2	4		Carrots and Sticks
"Rhythm" (リズム)	2019	2	63		Carrots and Sticks
"Tomorrow"	2020	—N/a	48		Letters
"Story of Duty"	2020	—N/a	—		Going to Destruction
"Star"	2021	—N/a	—		Going to Destruction
"Zenshin Zenrei"	2021	—N/a	—		Going to Destruction
"In Case..."	2021	—N/a	—		Going to Destruction
"Stacking"	2021	—N/a	—		Going to Destruction
"Final Shits"	2022	3	55		Bish The Best
"Pyo" (ぴょ)	2022	2	32		Bish The Best
"Aishiteru to Ittekure" (愛してると言ってくれ)	2022	4	56		Bish The Best
"Gomen ne" (ごめんね)	2022	4	31		Bish The Best
"Lie Lie Lie"	2022	3	57		Bish The Best
"Donna ni Kimi ga Kawattemo Boku ga Donna Fu ni Kawattemo Ashita ga Kuru Kimi ni Autame" (どんなに君が変わっても僕がどんなふうに変わっても明日が来る君に会うため)	2022	4	51		Bish The Best
"See You"	2022	8	—		Bish The Best
"Sayonara Saraba" (サヨナラサラバ)	2022	5	28		Bish The Best
"Up to Me"	2022	9	88		Bish The Best
"Kanashimi yo Tomare" (悲しみよとまれ)	2022	3	66		Bish The Best
"Datsu Kisei Gainen" (脱・既成概念)	2022	11	—		Bish The Best
"Zutto"	2022	3	56		Bish The Best
"Bye-Bye Show"	2023	1	1	RIAJ: Platinum	Bish The Best
"Innocent Arrogance"	2023	—N/a	—		Bish The Best
"Patient!! (Bish ver.)"	2023	—N/a	—		Non-album singles
"The Next (Bish ver.)"	2023	—N/a	—		Non-album singles
"—" denotes a recording that did not chart or was not released in that territory.

==== Collaborations ====
Title	Year	Peak chart positions		Album
Title	Year	Oricon	JPN Billboard	Album
"Future World" (Shingo Katori feat. Bish)	2019	—	35	20200101
"Bad Temper" (with Yuki Kashiwagi)	2021	9	—	Non-album single

=== Other appearances ===
List of non-studio album or guest appearances that feature BiSH
Title	Year	Album
"Moon Revenge" (プリンセス・ムーン)	2018	Pretty Guardian Sailor Moon: The 25th Anniversary Memorial Tribute
"Kanariya Naku Sora" (カナリヤ鳴く空)	2019	Tokyo Ska Paradise Orchestra Tribute Collection: Rakuen Jyusan Kei
"Ash Like Snow" (アッシュ ライク スノー)	2020	Mobile Suit Gundam 40th Anniversary Album ~BEYOND~
"Jitterbug" (ジターバグ)	2022	Ellegarden Tribute

== Videography ==
=== Live albums ===
Title	Album details	Peak chart positions	
Title	Album details	DVD	Blu-ray
Less Than Sex Tour Final "Teiousekkai" Hibiya Yagai Dai Ongakudou (Less Than Sex Tour Final "帝王切開" 日比谷野外大音楽堂)	Released: 18 January 2017; Label: Avex Trax; Formats: DVD, Blu-ray+CD, digital download	19	9
Bish Nevermind Tour Reloaded The Final "Revolutions"	Released: 1 November 2017; Label: Avex Trax; Formats: DVD, Blu-ray+2CD, digital download	8	7
Bish "To The End"	Released: 29 August 2018; Label: Avex Trax; Formats: DVD, Blu-ray+2CD, digital download	8	8
Bring Icing Shit Horse Tour Final "The Nude"	Released: 3 April 2019; Label: Avex Trax; Formats: DVD, Blu-ray+2CD, digital download	3	4
And yet Bish moves.	Released: 15 January 2020; Label: Avex Trax; Formats: DVD, Blu-ray+2CD, digital download	2	5
Tokyo Bish Shine6 (Live at Zepp Tokyo 2020.8.19)	Released: 18 November 2020; Label: Avex Trax; Formats: DVD, Blu-ray+2CD, digital download	2	2
Reboot Bish	Released: 26 May 2021; Label: Avex Trax; Formats: DVD, Blu-ray+2CD, digital download	1	3
Bish presents From Dusk Till Dawn	Released: 3 December 2021; Label: Avex Trax; Formats: 4DVD, 3Blu-ray+photobook, 3Blu-ray+7CD+photobook, digital download	2	3
Bish Out of The Blue	Released: 15 February 2023; Label: Avex Trax; Formats: DVD, 2Blu-ray+3CD, 2Blu-ray+3CD+photobook, digital download	4	3
Bye-Bye Show For Never At Tokyo Dome	Released: 22 November 2023; Label: Avex Trax; Formats: 3DVD, 2Blu-ray, 3Blu-ray, digital download	TBA	TBA

=== Documentary albums ===
Title	Album details	Peak chart positions	
Title	Album details	DVD	Blu-ray
All You Need is Punk and Love	Released: 9 December 2017; Label: Space Shower Music; Formats: DVD, Blu-ray, digital download	40	—
Bish Documentary Movie "Shape of Love"	Released: 29 August 2018; Label: Avex Trax; Formats: DVD, Blu-ray, digital download	21	12
Bish presents PCR is Paipai Chinchin Rock'n'Roll	Released: 26 April 2023; Label: Avex Trax; Formats: DVD, Blu-ray	—	17

== Awards and nominations ==
Award ceremony	Year	Category	Nominee(s)/work(s)	Result	Ref.
Crunchyroll Anime Awards	2024	Best Opening Sequence	"Innocent Arrogance"	Nominated	
Japan Record Awards	2018	Best New Artist	Bish	Won	
MTV Video Music Awards Japan	2019	Best Alternative Video	"Stereo Future"	Won	
MTV Video Music Awards Japan	2020	Best Cinematography	"Letters"	Won	
MTV Video Music Awards Japan	2022	Inspiration Award Japan	Bish	Won	
