= Centchihiro Chittiii =

Japanese singer and idol

Centchihiro Chittiii セントチヒロ・チッチ
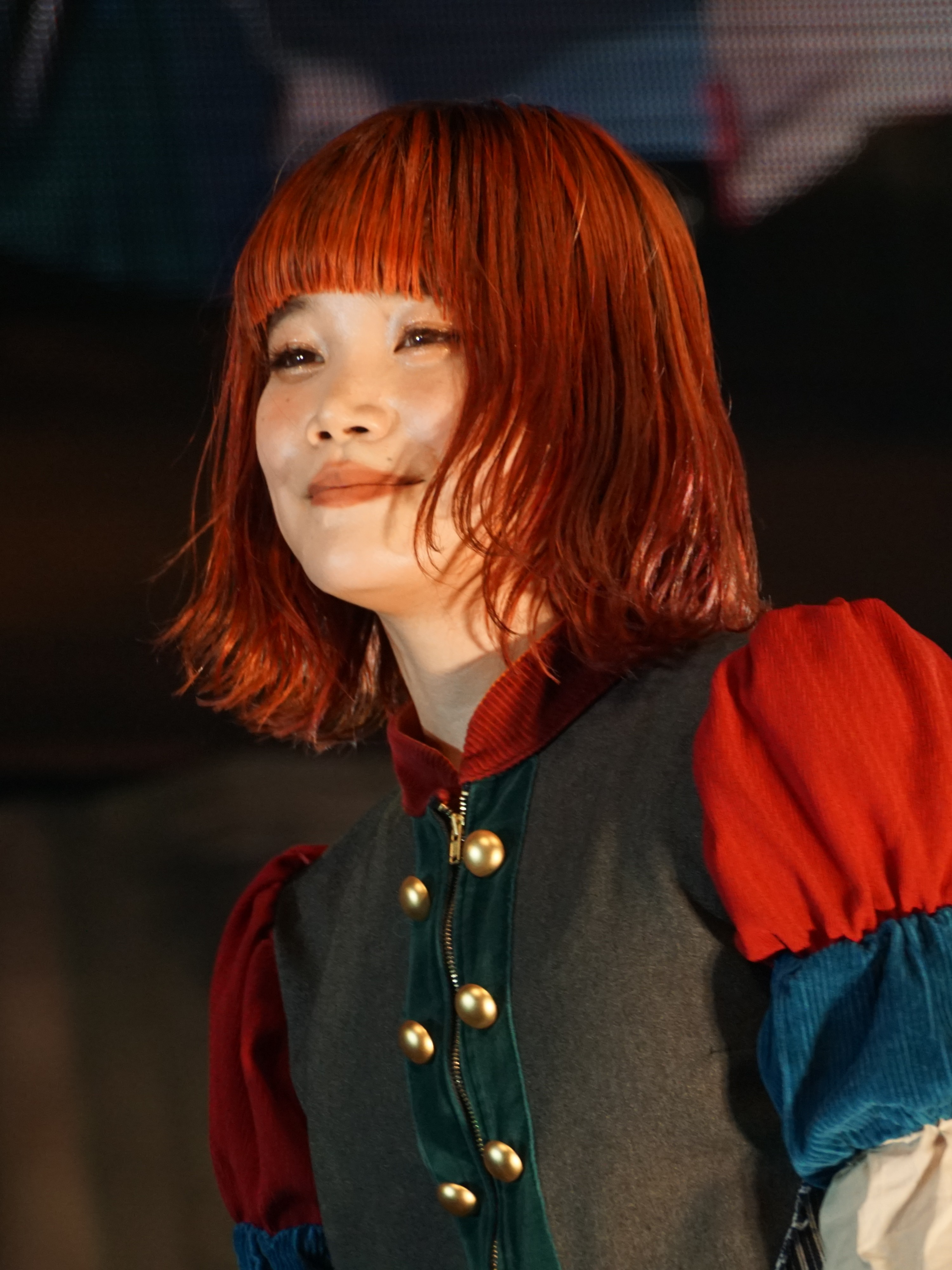
- Centchihiro Chittiii in 2019

Background information
- Also known as: Cent, Chihiro Katō (加藤千尋), Aoi Chihiro (蒼井ちひろ)
- Born: May 8, 1993 (age 33); Hachiōji, Japan
- Genres: J-pop, rock
- Years active: 2014–present
- Labels: WACK, Stardust Promotion
- Formerly of: Bish
- Website: centplanet.world

Centchihiro Chittiii (Japanese: セントチヒロ・チッチ, Hepburn: Sentochihiro Chitchi), also known as Cent (stylized in all caps) and Chihiro Katō (加藤千尋), is a Japanese singer, idol and actor. She is a former member of the idol group Bish. She released her debut solo album, Per→cent→age, in August 2023.

== Career ==
From mid 2014 to early 2015, Chihiro was a member of Tsuyogari Sensation under the name Aoi Chihiro (蒼井ちひろ).

In March 2015, Chihiro was revealed as a member of Bish.

In September 2016, Chihiro joined an idol supergroup which had been formed to perform at the 2016 @Jam x Natalie Expo.

In 2017, Chihiro won the WACK General Election, in which the two members with the highest votes would release a solo song, she would therefore release a solo song the following year alongside band-mate Aina who was the runner-up.

In March 2018, Chihiro alongside Aina the End provided vocals for Marty Friedman's "Wasted Tears", on B The Beginning: The Image Album. In July, she joined WACK's second shuffle unit, Holy Shits. In September, nine months after winning the WACK General Election, Chihiro and Aina released the single "Youji to Tsuki no Hime / Kienaide", with Chihiro singing the first song.

In 2019, she began co-hosting Spice Travelers. The TV show spawned a band of the same name which Chihiro joined as a member.

In September 2021, Chihiro voiced the character Azuki Arai in Ragnador. In December, Chihiro joined Spy, a new shuffle unit under WACK produced by Yuki Kashiwagi, after finishing seventh in the Vote! WACK Select 7 competition.

In May 2022, Chihiro featured on This Is Japan's song "Karagara". In August, Chihiro released "Himawari", her first digital single as Cent. Her second digital single, "Suteki na Yokan", was released in February 2023. At Bish's disbandment concert on June 29, it was announced that Chihiro would release her first solo album, Per→cent→age, in August. In November 2023, she will make her stage acting debut under the name Chihiro Katō (加藤千尋) in Kaminari ni 7-kai Uta Rete mo (雷に7回撃たれても).

On January 5, 2024, Chihiro left WACK and signed with Stardust Promotion.

== Discography ==
=== Studio albums ===
Title	Album details	Peak positions	
Title	Album details	JPN Oricon	JPN Billboard
Per→cent→age	Released: August 23, 2023; Label: WACK; Formats: CD, digital download	18	16
Yasashii Inryoku (やさしい引力)	Released: November 11, 2026; Label: Victor Entertainment; Formats: CD, digital download	22	—

=== Extended plays ===
Title	Album details	Peak positions
Title	Album details	JPN Oricon
Love Album (らぶあるばむ)	Released: August 20, 2025; Label: Victor Entertainment; Formats: CD, digital download	9

=== Singles ===
==== As lead artist ====
Title	Year	Peak positions		Album
Title	Year	JPN Oricon	JPN Billboard	Album
"Youji to Tsuki no Hime" (夜王子と月の姫)	2018	10	32	Non-album single
"Himawari" (向日葵)	2022	—	—	Per→cent→age
"Suteki na Yokan" (すてきな予感)	2023	—	—	Per→cent→age
"—" denotes a recording that did not chart or was not released in that territory.

==== As featured artist ====
Title	Year	Album
"Human After All" Ghost Oracle Drive feat. Centchihiro Chittiii	2016	TV Anime "God Eater" Insert Song Collection
"Wasted Tears" Marty Friedman feat. Aina the End, Centchihiro Chittiii	2018	B The Beginning: The Image Album
"Karagara" This is Japan feat. Centchihiro Chittiii	2022	Twilight Fuzz

== Filmography ==
=== Film ===
Year	Title	Role	Notes	Ref.
2025	Meets the World	Megumi Takato		
2026	Hyoketsu	Yuki		
2026	Missed You, Left You, Lost You, Miss You	Mizuho Hiura		

=== Television ===
Year	Title	Role	Notes	Ref.
2025	Escape	Masaki Onishi		
2026	Soul Mate	Madoka		
