= Aina the End =

Japanese singer and actress (born 1994)

Aina the End アイナ・ジ・エンド
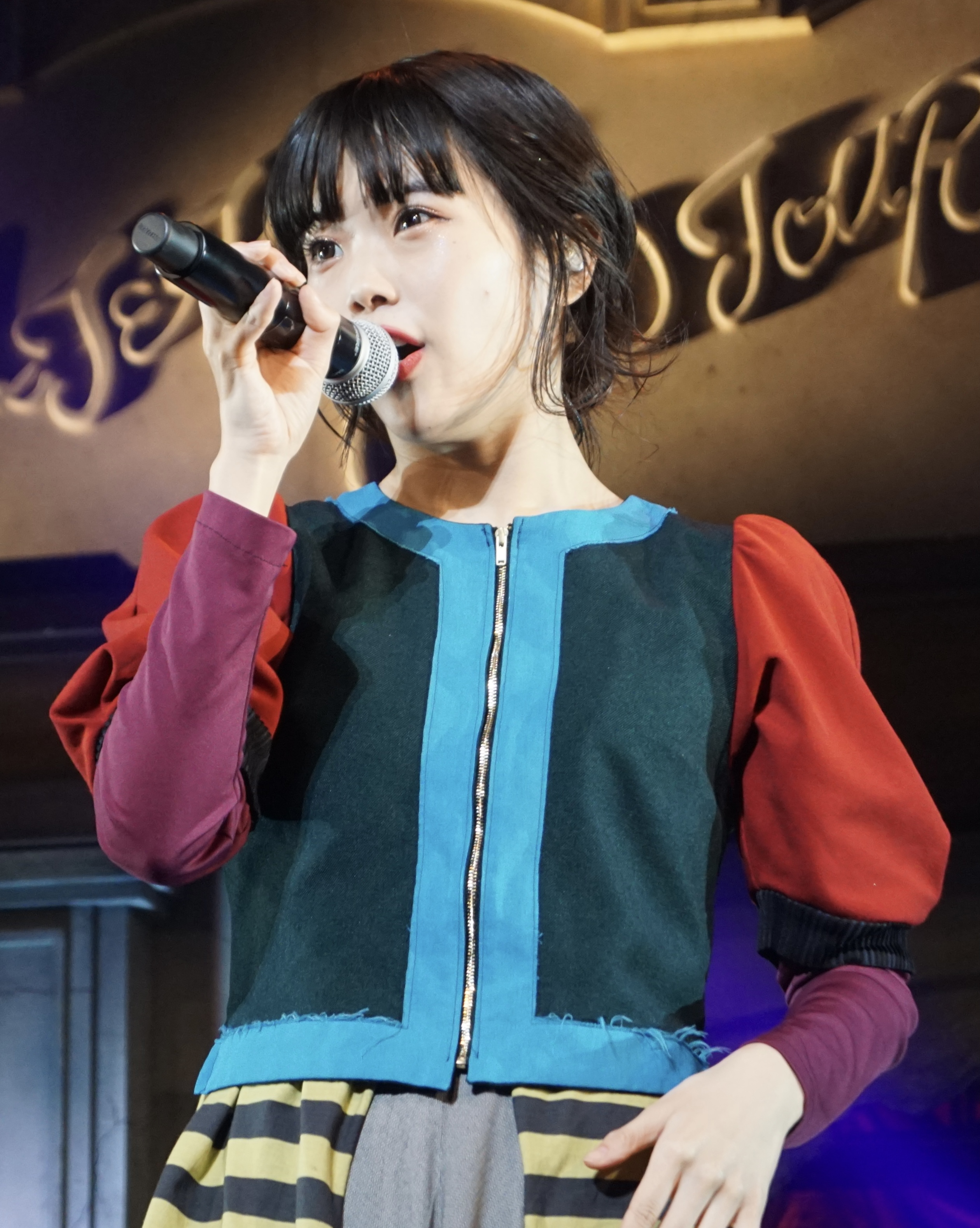
- Aina the End in 2019

Background information
- Born: Aina Iitani (飯谷 愛菜); December 27, 1994 (age 31); Osaka Prefecture, Japan
- Genres: J-pop; rock
- Occupations: Singer; actress
- Years active: 2015–present
- Labels: Avex Trax; WACK
- Formerly of: Bish
- Website: ainatheend.jp

Aina Iitani (Japanese: 飯谷 愛菜, romanized: Iitani Aina; born December 27, 1994), known professionally as Aina the End (アイナ・ジ・エンド, Aina ji Endo), stylized as AiNA THE END, is a Japanese singer and actress. She is a former member of the idol group Bish.

== Biography ==
Aina the End was born Aina Iitani on December 27, 1994 in Osaka Prefecture. Her father is a photographer while her mother was a former singer.

== Career ==
=== Bish ===
Prior to joining Bish, Aina the End moved to Tokyo and first worked as a singer at a nightclub in Shibuya, then in a backup dancing unit named Parallel for the singer Yucat. Following the disbandment of Bis, the manager of the group, Junnosuke Watanabe, began auditions for a new group named Bish in January 2015. In March of the same year, Aina the End was revealed as one of the five members who passed the auditions. Within the group, she is known for her husky voice, and has also choreographed songs for Bish and Empire.

In December 2016, Bish briefly went on hiatus as she underwent surgery for vocal polyps. She returned the next year for the release of the single "Promise the Star". After the release of Wack & Scrambles Works, a joint album of groups under the management of WACK that included the reformed Bis and Gang Parade, a popularity contest was held for all participating members. The top two ranked members would release a single together under Avex Trax. Aina the End won second place behind fellow Bish member Cent Chihiro Chittiii. The single titled "Yoru Ōji to Tsuki no Hime / Kienaide" was released on September 19, 2018, with Aina the End singing the second song.

=== Solo work ===
Outside of Bish, Aina the End has appeared as the vocalist for other artists such as TeddyLoid, Mondo Grosso, Marty Friedman, My First Story, Dish//, and Sugizo. In 2018, she formed the duo SexFriend with UK from Moroha to cover Hide's song "Bacteria" for the Tribute Impulse album. She also performed the outro of the 2020 television drama Shinitai Yoru ni Kagitte. The song, which is titled after the series, was the first song written entirely by Aina the End.

She released her debut solo album, The End, on February 3, 2021. Her first EP, Naisho (内緒), was released on March 2. She released her second solo album, The Zombie, on November 24.

In 2022, she performed the dubbing voice for Porsha Crystal in Sing 2. She was also the lead actress in the Broadway musical A Night with Janis Joplin.

In 2023, her singles "Red:birthmark" and "Ai Kotoba" were used in anime series' Mobile Suit Gundam: The Witch from Mercury's second season and The Apothecary Diaries, respectively, as the ending songs. She also played the leading role in Kyrie.

In March 2024, Aina the End created the theme song "Frail" for the film Hen na Ie.

In July 2025, her single "Kakumei Dōchū" was used as the opening song in the second season of the anime series Dandadan. The song, written and composed by Aina, surpassed 6.5 million streams globally, made Spotify’s Viral Top 50 Global chart, and ranked in the Top 50 of Billboard Japan's Hot 100 for three consecutive weeks. On TikTok, the song surpassed 100 million plays.

== Discography ==
=== Studio albums ===
Title	Album details	Peak positions	
Title	Album details	JPN Oricon	JPN Billboard
The End	Released: February 3, 2021; Label: Avex Trax; Formats: CD, 2CD, CD+Blu-ray, digital download	3	3
The Zombie	Released: November 24, 2021; Label: Avex Trax; Formats: CD, CD+DVD, CD+Blu-ray+photobook, digital download	12	11
Debut	Released as Kyrie; Released: October 18, 2023; Label: Avex Trax; Formats: CD, CD+DVD, CD+Blu-ray, digital download	14	12
Ruby Pop	Released: November 27, 2024; Label: Avex Trax; Formats: CD, CD+DVD, digital download	10	11

=== Live albums ===
Title	Album details
1st Solo Tour "The End"	Released: November 24, 2021; Label: Avex Trax; Formats: digital download

=== Extended plays ===
Title	Album details	Peak positions
Title	Album details	JPN Oricon
Naisho (内緒)	Released: March 2, 2021; Label: Avex Trax; Formats: CD, digital download	18
Born Sick	Released: September 20, 2021; Label: Avex Trax; Formats: digital download	—
Dead Happy	Released: October 25, 2021; Label: Avex Trax; Formats: digital download	—

=== Singles ===
==== As lead artist ====
Title	Year	Peak positions				Album
Title	Year	JPN	JPN Hot	US World	WW	Album
"Kienaide" (きえないで)	2018	10	—	—	—	The End
"Shinitai Yoru ni Kagitte" (死にたい夜にかぎって)	2020	—	—	—	—	The End
"Dare Dare Dare" (誰誰誰)	2021	—	—	—	—	The Zombie
"Watashi wa Koko ni Imasu for Ame" (ワタシハココニイマス for 雨)	2021	—	—	—	—	The Zombie
"Romance no Chi" (ロマンスの血)	2021	—	—	—	—	The Zombie
"Ware wa Uminoko" (われは海の子)	2021	—	—	—	—	Non-album singles
"Otona ni Natte" (大人になって)	2022	—	—	—	—	Non-album singles
"Watashi no Magokoro" (私の真心)	2022	—	—	—	—	Non-album singles
"Red:birthmark"	2023	—	—	—	—	Ruby Pop
"Hōseki no Hibi" (宝石の日々)	2023	—	—	—	—	Ruby Pop
"Namae no Nai Machi" (名前のない街) as Kyrie	2023	—	—	—	—	Debut
"Moetsukiru Tsuki" (燃え尽きる月) as Kyrie	2023	—	—	—	—	Debut
"Ai Kotoba" (アイコトバ)	2023	—	—	—	—	Ruby Pop
"Kyashana Kokoro" (華奢な心)	2023	—	—	—	—	Ruby Pop
"Ho" (帆)	2023	—	—	—	—	Ruby Pop
"Takaramono" (宝者)	2024	—	73	—	—	Ruby Pop
"Frail"	2024	—	—	—	—	Ruby Pop
"Love Sick"	2024	—	—	—	—	Ruby Pop
"Heart to Heart" (ハートにハート)	2024	—	—	—	—	Ruby Pop
"Kazeto kuchizuketo" (風とくちづけと)	2024	—	—	—	—	Ruby Pop
"Kakumei Dōchū" (革命道中)	2025	18	4	9	165	TBA
"Luminous" (ルミナス)	2026	25	36	—	—	TBA
"—" denotes a recording that did not chart or was not released in that territory.

==== As featured artist ====
Title	Year	Peak positions	Album
Title	Year	JPN Billboard	Album
"To the End" TeddyLoid feat. Aina the End	2017	—	Silent Planet 2 Vol. 4
"Break the Doors" TeddyLoid feat. Aina the End	2017	—	Silent Planet: Reloaded
"Wasted Tears" Marty Friedman feat. Aina the End, Cent Chihiro Chittiii	2018	—	B the Beginning: The Image Album
"False Sympathy" (偽りのシンパシー) Mondo Grosso feat. Aina the End	2018	76	Attune / Detune
"Sing-a-Long" Dish// feat. Aina the End	2019	—	Junkfood Junction
"Hikari no Hate" (光の涯) Sugizo feat. Aina the End	2019	—	Love & Tranquility
"Fubenna Kawaiige" (不便な可愛げ) Genie High feat. Aina the End	2019	—	Genie High Story
"Fave" SawanoHiroyuki[nZk]: Aina the End	2021	—	iv
"Margherita + Aina the End" (マルゲリータ + アイナ・ジ・エンド) Kenshi Yonezu feat. Aina the End	2024	—	Lost Corner
"—" denotes a recording that did not chart or was not released in that territory.

==== Soundtrack appearances ====
Title	Year	Album
"Part of Your World" (パート・オブ・ユア・ワールド)	2017	Thank You Disney

=== Video albums ===
Title	Album details	Peak chart positions	
Title	Album details	DVD	Blu-ray
Kiso Honno (帰巣本能)	Released: 28 September 2022; Label: Avex Trax; Formats: DVD, 2Blu-ray	12	16
Endroll	Released: 19 March 2025; Label: Avex Trax; Formats: DVD, 2Blu-ray	—	—

== Filmography ==
=== Film ===
Year	Title	Role	Directed by	Notes	Ref.
2023	Kyrie	Kyrie	Shunji Iwai	Lead role	

=== Japanese dub ===
Year	Title	Role	Notes	Ref.
2021	Sing 2	Porsha Crystal	2022 Japanese dub	

== Awards and nominations ==
Award ceremony	Year	Category	Nominee(s)/work(s)	Result	Ref.
MTV Video Music Awards Japan	2021	Best Cinematography	"Kinmokusei" (金木犀)	Won	
Nikkan Sports Film Awards	2023	Best Newcomer	Kyrie	Nominated	
Hochi Film Awards	2023	Best New Artist	Kyrie	Won	
Mainichi Film Awards	2024	Best New Actress	Kyrie	Nominated	
Blue Ribbon Awards	2024	Best Newcomer	Kyrie	Nominated	
Japan Academy Film Prize	2024	Newcomer of the Year	Kyrie	Won	
Kinema Junpo Awards	2024	Best New Actress	Kyrie	Won	
