= 2022 in Japanese music =

The year 2022 in Japanese music.

== Debuting ==
=== Debuting groups ===
- &Team
- Boysgroup
- Classy
- ExWhyZ
- Fruits Zipper
- Golden Child
- Ive
- Kep1er
- The Last Rockstars
- Lil League from Exile Tribe
- Metamuse
- MyGO!!!!!
- Ocha Norma
- Omega X
- OnlyOneOf
- Psychic Fever from Exile Tribe
- STAYC
- TFN
- Travis Japan
- Verivery
- WEi
- XG

=== Debuting soloists ===
- Akari Akase
- Hanna Ishikawa
- Kang Daniel
- Kent Itō
- Miru Shiroma
- Onew
- SennaRin
- Yoshino Aoyama
- Yuki Yomichi

== Returning from hiatus ==
=== Returning groups ===
- Doping Panda
- Mrs. Green Apple

== Number-ones ==
- Oricon number-one albums
- Oricon number-one singles
- Hot 100 number-one singles

== Awards ==
- 64th Japan Record Awards
- 2022 MTV Video Music Awards Japan

== Albums released ==
=== January ===
Date	Album	Artist	Ref.
5	City	SixTones	
5	Placebo	ASP	
12	We are Girls²	Girls²	
12	Ichi	Yuuri	
12	OnlyOneOf Japan Best Album	OnlyOneOf	
19	Bad Mode	Hikaru Utada	
25	Ray of Light	The Rampage from Exile Tribe	
26	Mirror	Scandal	
26	Kyōgen	Ado	

=== February ===
Date	Album	Artist	Ref.
1	Love Cycle	Ayaka	
2	1518	@onefive	
2	26/27	Airi Suzuki	
2	Blue Cresc.	Cynhn	
2	Visions	Milet	
9	Fo(u)r YuU	Liyuu	
16	Team	Team Shachi	
23	Dream	Ai	
23	Tokyo	Super Beaver	

=== March ===
Date	Album	Artist	Ref.
4	Queendom	Awich	
9	Gundam Song Covers 3	Hiroko Moriguchi	
9	Collage	Masaki Suda	
9	Flare	Milet	
9	Our Teen: Blue Side	T1419	
16	1 or 8	Eito	
16	#Twice4	Twice	
16	Epitaph	Tohoshinki	
23	Shiritsu Ebisu Chugaku	Shiritsu Ebisu Chugaku	
23	Umibe	Sid	
30	Pinky Swear	CIX	
30	Oh My Girl Best	Oh My Girl	
30	Adapt	Sakanaction	

=== April ===
Date	Album	Artist	Ref.
6	Bloom	Red Velvet	
13	Dignified	SennaRin	
20	Terzo	Juice=Juice	
20	Journey	Little Glee Monster	
20	L.S.	Lyrical School	
22	Shunka Ryougen	Haru Nemuri	

=== May ===
Date	Album	Artist	Ref.
11	Antidote	Taichi Mukai	
17	Shukuten	Momoiro Clover Z	
18	Assort	Novelbright	
18	Reflection	Tofubeats	
25	Kizuna	JO1	
25	Break and Cross the Walls II	Man with a Mission	
25	Beyond: Zero	Ateez	
27	She's the Boss	The Boyz	
30	The Greatest	BoA	

=== June ===
Date	Album	Artist	Ref.
1	The Highlight	Sexy Zone	
8	Harukakanatae	Haruka Fukuhara	
15	Sono Ichi	Ho6la	
15	Phalaris	Dir En Grey	
17 / 20	Marumaru to Ninomiya to	Kazunari Ninomiya	
22	Circus	Stray Kids	
22	Softly	Tatsuro Yamashita	
29	Made In	King & Prince	
29	Mikansei no Mirai	NGT48	
29	The Best: Dear Fantasy	SF9	

=== July ===
Date	Album	Artist	Ref.
6	Nonnegative	Coldrain	
6	Delighted Reviver	Nana Mizuki	
6	Life Goes On	Onew	
8	Unity	Mrs. Green Apple	
13	But wait. Cats?	Alexandros	
13	1st Love	Naniwa Danshi	
20	First Snow First Love	Yuki Yomichi	
20	Dempark!!!	Dempagumi.inc	
27	Plasma	Perfume	
27	Celebrate	Twice	

=== August ===
Date	Album	Artist	Ref.
3	As You Know?	Sakurazaka46	
3	Nocturnal	Tokyo Girls' Style	‌
10	Uta's Songs: One Piece Film Red	Ado	
10	Weather	B.O.L.T	
10	Highway X	B'z	
11	Youth	WEi	
17	Falling Into Your Eyes Record	Aimyon	
17	We are Cats.	The World Standard	
17	Savior	AB6IX	
17	Vocalo Zanmai 2	Wagakki Band	
24	Genesis	Arcana Project	
24	Stand Up!	Omega X	
31	Be: 1	Be First	

=== September ===
Date	Album	Artist	Ref.
2	Japan Activity Best	EXID	
9	Luxury Disease	One Ok Rock	
14	Feelin' Like	Pentagon	
21	Unleash	Band-Maid	
21	Snow Labo. S2	Snow Man	
21	For.	Sumika	
28	Beyooooo2nds	Beyooooonds	

=== October ===
Date	Album	Artist	Ref.
5	Joy Ride	Kang Daniel	
5	Doki Doki Love	Rocket Punch	
12	Quarter	Anly	
12	Hitori Toiro	Karin Miyamoto	
26	Sadame	Enhypen	

=== November ===
Date	Album	Artist	Ref.
2	XYZ	ExWhyZ	
9	Dream	Seventeen	
16	Lander	LiSA	
18	E-Side 2	Yoasobi	
23	Dopamine	Oneus	
30	The World EP. Paradigm	Ateez	

=== December ===
Date	Album	Artist	Ref.
14	Deep Down	Aimer	
14	Hotel Insomnia	For Tracy Hyde	
14	Magnetic	Kaela Kimura	
14	Seize the Fate	Nemophila	

== Disbanding and retiring artists ==
=== Disbanding ===
- Empire
- Go to the Beds
- Predia
- HO6LA

=== Going on hiatus ===
- Kiyoshi Hikawa
- Mary's Blood
- Hikaru Yaotome
- Yoshimotozaka46
