= 2024 in Asian music =

== Events ==
- 2 January – 33rd Seoul Music Awards take place at Bangkok, hosted by Lee Seung-gi, Tiffany Young, BamBam and Youngjae. Winners include NCT Dream, NewJeans, SEVENTEEN and Kim Ho-joong.
- 6 January
  - The 38th Golden Disc Awards take place at Jakarta, Indonesia
  - Japanese girl groups Tonai Bousho and Mameshiba no Taigun merge to form Mameshiba no Taigun Tonai Bousho a.k.a. MonsterIdol.
- 10 January – The 13th Circle Chart Music Awards take place in Busan, South Korea.
- 24 January – Korean composer Unsuk Chin is announced as the recipient of the 2024 Ernst von Siemens Music Prize.
- 31 January – The Manila Symphony Orchestra gives its 98th Anniversary Concert.
- unknown date – Japanese actress Hina Tachibana begins a solo singing career by releasing her version of "I'm Game!" (the closing theme Gods' Games We Play) as a single.
- 16 November – Lost In Harmony (Isyana Sarasvati's Decade Concert) in Jakarta

== Albums ==
- The Hu – Live at Glastonbury
- A. R. Rahman – Ayalaan, soundtrack to the film of the same name (January 10)
- Ryujin – Ryujin (January 12)
- Hikaru Utada – Science Fiction (April 10)
- @onefive – Classy Crush (April 17)

== Musical films ==
- Doraemon: Nobita's Earth Symphony (Japan)
- Teri Baaton Mein Aisa Uljha Jiya (India - Hindi)
- Unarvugal Thodarkadhai (India - Tamil)

== Classical works ==
- Xi Wang – YEAR 2020 (double concerto for violin, trumpet, and orchestra)

== By country ==
- 2024 in Chinese music
- 2024 in Japanese music
- 2024 in Philippine music
- 2024 in South Korean music

== Deaths ==
- 13 January – Prabha Atre, Indian classical vocalist, 91
- 18 January – Yogesh Vaidya, Nepalese singer, 77
- 25 January – Bhavatharini, Indian singer and composer, 47 (liver cancer)
- 7 February – Vaja Azarashvili, Georgian composer, 87
- 18 February
  - Davlatmand Kholov, Tajik folk musician, 73 (cancer)
  - Hasina Mumtaz, Bangladeshi singer, 78
- 23 February – Shinsadong Tiger, South Korean record producer, 40
- 26 February
  - Bhakta Raj Acharya, Nepali singer and composer, 81
  - Pankaj Udhas, Indian ghazal and playback singer, 72
- 5 March – Amnon Weinstein, Israeli luthier, 84
- 8 March – Ramya Wanigasekara, 73, Sri Lankan actress, singer, and radio broadcaster
- 20 March – Faramarz Aslani, Iranian singer, guitarist and music producer, 78
- 8 April – Melitha Sidabutar, Indonesian gospel singer, 23 (heart failure)
- 11 April – Park Bo-ram, South Korean singer, 30 (cardiac arrest)
- 15 April – Reita, Japanese rock bassist, 42
- 16 April – K. G. Jayan, Indian Carnatic singer, musician, and music director, 89
- 1 May – Uma Ramanan, Indian playback singer, 72
- 5 May – Kelath Aravindakshan Marar, Indian percussionist, 82
- 11 June – Rajeev Taranath, Indian classical sarod player, 91
- 28 June – Kong Nay, Cambodian chapei dang veng player, 80
- 15 July – Hyun Cheol, South Korean singer, 82
- 21 July – Kim Min-ki, South Korean singer, composer, and musical playwright, 73 (cancer)
- 24 July – Shafin Ahmed, Bangladeshi singer-songwriter, 63 (heart and kidney failure)
- 20 August
  - Manju Mehta, Indian sitar player, 79
  - Charin Nantanakorn, Thai singer, 91
- 11 September – Senaka Batagoda, Sri Lankan singer, 66
- 20 September – Srirangam Kannan, Indian musician and artist, 72
- 3 November – Dina Mariana, Indonesian singer, 59
- 5 November – Sharda Sinha, Indian folk and classical singer, 72
- 8 November – Musafir Ram Bhardwaj, 94, Indian paun mata player
- 15 November – Aashish Khan, Indian classical musician, 84
- 3 December – Huang Zhun, Chinese composer, 98
- 6 December – Miho Nakayama, Japanese singer and actress, 54
- 12 December – Papia Sarwar, Bangladeshi singer, 72
- 15 December – Zakir Hussain, Indian tabla player (Shakti), 73
- 19 December – Darshanam Mogilaiah, Indian tribal musician and Kinnera player, 73

== See also ==
- 2024 in music
