= Sweet & Sour (ExWhyZ EP) =

EP by ExWhyZ
- Released: July 31, 2024
- Genre: J-pop
- Length: 18:01
- Language: Japanese
- Label: WACK; Universal Music Japan

ExWhyZ chronology
Dress to Kill (2024)	Sweet & Sour (2024)

Sweet & Sour is the second extended play from Japanese girl group ExWhyZ. It was released on July 31, 2024, by Universal Music Japan. The album consists of five tracks.

== Track listing ==
No.	Title	Lyrics	Music	Length
1.	"Drama" (ドラマ)	Mikina, Asoboism	Shingo Kubota	3:26
2.	"Night Coaster"	Kanata Okajima	Seiho	3:53
3.	"Present" (ExWhyZ ver.)	Ryo'Lefty'Miyata, Cartoon, Yui Mugino, Nijimas, Hiro Ichimura	Ryo'Lefty'Miyata, Cartoon, Yui Mugino, Nijimas, Hiro Ichimura	2:54
4.	"I won't tell" (教えない)	KBSNK	KBSNK	4:06
5.	"Sweet & Sour"	KBSNK	KBSNK	3:40
Total length:				18:01

== Charts ==
Chart	Peak position
Japanese Albums (Oricon)	5
Japanese Albums (Billboard)	4
