= Delicious Vicious =

- Cover for the physical limited edition and digital release

EP by ASP
- Released: April 26, 2023
- Genres: J-pop; electronic rock; hyperpop; alternative rock; trap; synth pop
- Length: 14:06
- Language: Japanese
- Labels: WACK; Avex Trax

ASP chronology
Placebo (2022)	Delicious Vicious (2023)	Terminal Disease of ASP (2024)

Singles from Delicious Vicious
- 1. "I Won't Let You Go" Released: November 30, 2022; 2. "No Color S" Released: March 27, 2023

Delicious Vicious (Note: The EP title is stylized as DELiCiOUS ViCiOUS.) is the first extended play by Japanese alternative idol group ASP. It was released on April 26, 2023, through Avex Trax, following a postponement from its originally scheduled April 5 release due to production issues. The EP was supported by two singles, "I Won't Let You Go" and "No Color S", and was issued in both regular and limited editions, the latter including a Blu-ray featuring a live concert, music videos, and behind-the-scenes footage.

Musically, Delicious Vicious further expanded ASP's sound following the group's major-label debut, incorporating influences from electronic rock, hyperpop, alternative rock, and pop. The EP also marked an increase in collaborations with outside songwriters and producers, most notably featuring "Toxic Invasion", which was based on an original composition by Maxim of the English electronic music group The Prodigy. Upon its release, the EP received generally positive reviews from Japanese music critics, who praised its stylistic diversity and the group's continued artistic evolution.

Commercially, Delicious Vicious performed moderately on the Japanese album charts, peaking at number six on the Billboard Japan Hot Albums chart and number seven on the Oricon Weekly Albums Chart, becoming ASP's highest-charting release on both charts at the time.

== Background and release ==
ASP was formed by the agency WACK in March 2021 following the WACK Joint Audition 2021. The group's initial members were gradually revealed after the project was announced, and they made their debut on May 26, 2021, with the studio album Anal Sex Penis. Originally promoting themselves using their debut album title as a backronym, ASP later adopted the meaning "Anti Society Punks", reflecting a broader artistic direction while maintaining their alternative idol image.

I had this obsession that, if I were to form a new group, it simply had to be called 'Anal Sex Penis'. However, I realized it would be difficult to promote the group under that name, so I decided to use its initials instead, naming the group ASP (...).

— Watanabe Junnosuke about the group name, interview for Natalie.

During its first two years, ASP released the studio albums Anal Sex Penis (2021) and Placebo (2022), maintaining a more punk-oriented sound while expanding its lineup through new member additions and establishing itself as one of WACK's prominent alternative idol acts. In August 2022, the group made its major-label debut under Avex Trax, marking a new phase in its career. Their major-label debut single, "Hyper Cracker", represented a turning point, embracing a hyperpop-influenced sound that expanded the group's musical direction. This shift also led to an increase in the number of creators involved in ASP's music production.

Delicious Vicious' first preview came with the release of "I Won't Let You Go", which was issued as a digital-only single on November 30, 2022. One week prior to its release, the full version of the song was made available through a Tower Records promotional campaign that allowed fans to hear the track by calling a dedicated telephone number. The accompanying music video was directed by filmmaker Naoki Watanabe, who had previously directed music videos for BiSH and Aina the End, both associated with WACK. It features the members of ASP suspended by wires as they gradually float into the sky, creating a surreal visual motif. "No Color S", the second and final single released in support of the EP, was issued on March 27, 2023. Ahead of its official release, the song was previewed on TikTok, where videos of ASP members performing foot reflexology massage were uploaded daily on the group's official account as a form of promotion. The music video depicts the members transitioning from a monochrome lip-sync performance into colorful professional wrestling-inspired costumes and makeup. The video is notable for the intense facial expressions displayed by the seven members throughout the performance.

Originally scheduled for release on April 5, 2023, Delicious Vicious was postponed to April 26, 2023, due to production issues. Following the postponement of Delicious Vicious, ASP held a promotional event titled Sorry Delicious Vicious on April 8 and 9, 2023, as an apology to fans for the delay. During the event, the members were divided into three groups and visited CD stores across Japan, where they took part in release events and fan activities. The EP was officially released on the rescheduled date and was issued in two physical editions: a regular edition containing the CD only, and a limited edition that included a Blu-ray featuring the group's live performance Acoustic Sad Orchestra Tour Final - Critical Situations at Hibiya Open-Air Concert Hall as well as behind-the-scenes footage from the concert and selected music videos. Also, a 52-page deluxe photobook was included with the limited edition packaging. The cover artwork was designed by graphic artist Kamerian. Inspired by the EP's title, the art director adopted a food-based visual concept featuring imagery of meat and organs. Kamerian said he aimed to express ASP's "overwhelming vitality and rebellious spirit," using the act of eating as a metaphor for survival and the source of life.

Along with the release of Delicious Vicious on April 26, 2023, the music video for "Toxic Invasion" premiered on YouTube. The video was directed by Osrin, who had previously collaborated with ASP on the music video for "Haikei Rockstar-sama 2022".

== Composition and writing ==
Featuring five tracks, Delicious Vicious was considered a compilation of "genreless" songs by Billboard Japan at the time of its release, for its mix of different genres.

The EP's opening track, "Toxic Invasion", was based on an original composition provided by Maxim, the vocalist and MC of English electronic music group The Prodigy. The song has been described by the Japanese portal Barks as an electronic rock song, and was produced with the aim of engaging the group's fans while showcasing ASP's distinctive image through its hard-hitting sound. In a review for Real Sound, writer Noimura considered "Toxic Invasion" an ideal opening track for Delicious Vicious, describing it as "ferocious, violent, and above all, an incredibly exciting track". Songwriter and producer Pecori commented, "(...) I pursued a vocal style that could stand on its own and convey a distinct sense of coolness". Lyrically, "Toxic Invasion" centers on the theme of shattering existing ideals and illusions while conveying a sense of resolve for the future.

"No Color S" showcases a different side of ASP, pairing an upbeat, fast-paced pop arrangement driven by flickering electronic beats with a more restrained vocal delivery and a subtly playful tone. Its lyrics convey a quiet yet unmistakable sense of defiance toward the world. Blending elements of alternative rock, trap, and electro, "Please!!!" was conceived as a dark, downbeat composition. In contrast to the title track, it explores themes of apathy and earnest ambition over a trap-influenced instrumental.

Built around an intensely hardcore, gabber-inspired track, "Sexual Conversation" incorporates rap-influenced vocal delivery. In his review for Real Sound, Noimura described it as evoking an "acid trip", and praised its nuanced approach to sexual themes, citing its "exquisite and realistic sense of distance" as one of its defining qualities. Characterized by its melancholic melody, "I Won't Let You Go" showcases a more mature facet of ASP's musical style, considered a "gentle" song by member Riontown. Blending synthesizers and guitars, it has been described as a mellow synth-pop composition that evokes a sense of hope amid transience. Its lyrics explore feelings of devotion and commitment toward a loved one, as suggested by its title.

Reflecting on ASP's musical evolution following its major-label debut, member Riontown stated that the group's increasing incorporation of electronic and rap elements initially felt unfamiliar to her. However, she believed the stylistic shift attracted a broader audience beyond punk rock listeners, while also encouraging her to improve her vocal delivery and begin listening to rap music herself.

== Track listing ==
Credits adapted from the Oricon lyrics pages for each song. (Note: Credits for lyrics, composition and arrangement: "Toxic Invasion", "No Color S", "Please!!!", "Sexual Conversation", and "I Won't Let You Go".)

CD (regular and limited edition) and digital download
No.	Title	Lyrics	Music	Arrangements	Length
1.	"Toxic Invasion"	Pecori	Pecori	Pecori, Yohji Igarashi	3:27
2.	"No Color S"	Jw undersex	329	329	2:58
3.	"Please!!!"	Banny Bugs	Tsubame	Tsubame	2:23
4.	"Sexual Conversation"	Jw undersex	329, Togo	329, Togo	2:21
5.	"I Won't Let You Go"	Jw undersex	329	329	2:54
Total length:					14:06

Blu-ray (limited edition)
No.	Title	Length
1.	"2022.08.24 Acoustic Sad Orchestra Tour Final - Critical Situations at Hibiya Open-Air Concert Hall (Live Concert)"
2.	"2022.08.24 Acoustic Sad Orchestra Tour Final - Critical Situations at Hibiya Open-Air Concert Hall - Document Video"
3.	"I Won't Let You Go Music Video"
4.	"Behing the Scenes of "I Won't Let You Go" Music Video"
5.	"Hyper Cracker Music Video"
6.	"Behing the Scenes of "Hyper Cracker" Music Video"

Notes

- "Toxic Invasion" is stylized as "TOXiC INVASiON";
- "No Color S" and "Please!!!" are stylized in all caps;
- "Sexual Conversation" is stylized as "SEXUAL CONVERSATiON";
- "I Won't Let You Go" is stylized as "I won't let you go".

== Reception and commercial performance ==
In a review for Mikiki, Kōji Dejima described Delicious Vicious as a further exploration of the musical direction introduced by ASP's major-label debut single "Hyper Cracker". He praised the EP's emphasis on a harder, punk-inspired sound combined with electronic influences, noting that it represented a refinement of the group's evolving style. Also writing for Mikiki, Komainu praised the work for its stylistic diversity, noting that the EP spans genres ranging from rap to hybrid punk and that its varied musical palette mirrors the colorful imagery of the creature depicted on the cover artwork. Writing for Real Sound, Noimura characterized Delicious Vicious as both excessive and sincere, stating that these contrasting qualities are reflected in the EP's grotesque yet pop-inspired artwork by graphic artist Kamerian and its striking promotional imagery.

Upon its release, Delicious Vicious debuted at number seven on the Oricon Weekly Albums Chart, with first-week sales of 8,322 copies. It also peaked at number six on the Billboard Japan Hot Albums chart.

Chart	Peak position
Japanese Albums (Oricon)	7
Japan Hot Albums (Billboard Japan)	6
Top Albums Sales (Billboard Japan)	5
