= First Album =

First Album, The First Album, or 1st Album may refer to:

- The 1st Album (Modern Talking album), 1985
- First Album (Miss Kittin & The Hacker album), 2001
- First Album (The International Playboys album), 2002
- 1st Album (5566 album), 2002
- First Album (Twelve album), 2003
- The First Album (183 Club album), 2006
- First Album (Tofubeats album), 2014
- First Album (Kiss Kiss album), 2023
- The Fugs First Album, a 1965 album by the Fugs
- ZZ Top's First Album, a 1970 album by ZZ Top
- James Taylor (album), a 1968 album by James Taylor; released in South Africa as First Album
- Wild Horses (Wild Horses album), 1980; later reissued as The First Album
- Madonna (Madonna album), 1983; later reissued as Madonna: The First Album
- First Album, a 1992 album by Dive

== See also ==
- Debut (disambiguation)
- All Wikipedia articles about debut albums
