= List of Oricon number-one singles of 2019 =

The following is a list of Oricon number-one singles of 2019.

== Chart history ==
Issue date	Song	Artist(s)	Ref.
January 7	"The Idolmaster Million Theater Generation 12 (Harmonics)"	D/Zeal (Azusa Tadokoro and Aimi)	
January 14	"Let's Go Bowling!!"	Keisuke Kuwata & The Pin Boys	
January 21	"I Beg You/Hanabiratachi no Māchi/Sailing"	Aimer	
January 28	"Super Powers/Right Now"	V6	
February 4	"Bokura no Hashittekita Michi wa.../Next Sparkling!!"	Aqours	
February 11	"Homechigirisuto/Kizudarake no Ai"	Johnny's West	
February 18	"Kimi wo Daisuki da"	Kis-My-Ft2	
February 25	"Kaze wo Matsu"	STU48	
March 4	"Tokonoma Seiza Musume"	NMB48	
March 11	"Kuroi Hitsuji"	Keyakizaka46	
March 18	"Crystal"	Kanjani Eight	
March 25	"Jiwaru Days"	AKB48	
April 1	"Uchōten Shooter"	Matsuri Nine	
April 8	"Kyun"	Hinatazaka46	
April 15	"Kimi o Matteru"	King & Prince	
April 22	"Ishi"	HKT48	
April 29	"Otona Survivor"	Last Idol	
May 6	"Ame Nochi Hare"	Johnny's West	
May 13	"Kyun"	Hinatazaka46	
May 20	"Dark Knight"	One n' Only	
May 27	"Rain"	Kazuya Kamenashi	
June 3	"Lucky-Unlucky/Oh! My Darling"	Hey! Say! JUMP/Ryosuke Yamada	
June 10	"Sing Out!"	Nogizaka46	
June 17	"Aru Hi Negai ga Kanattanda/All for You"	V6	
June 24	"Top Gun/Love Story"	NEWS	
July 1	"Change"	Tomohisa Yamashita	
July 8	"Buenos Aires"	Iz*One	
July 15	"Lights/Boy with Luv"	BTS	
July 22	"Hands Up"	Kis-My-Ft2	
July 29	"Do Re Mi Sol La Si Do"	Hinatazaka46	
August 5	"Frustration"	SKE48	
August 12	"Daisuki na Hito"	STU48	
August 19	"Megane no Otokonoko/Nippon no DNA!/Go Waist"	Beyooooonds	
August 26	"Bokō e Kaere!"	NMB48	
September 2	"Fanfare!"	Hey! Say! JUMP	
September 9	"Koi-Wazurai"	King & Prince	
September 16	"Yoake Made Tsuyogaranakutemoii"	Nogizaka46	
September 23	"Brave"	Arashi	
September 30	"Sustainable"	AKB48	
October 7	"Vampire"	Iz*One	
October 14	"Konna ni Suki ni Natchatte Ii no?"	Hinatazaka46	
October 21	"Big Shot!!"	Johnny's West	
October 28	"Category/My Love"	One n' Only	
November 4	"Kirin no Ko/Honey Honey"	Sexy Zone	
November 11	"Zurui yo Zurui ne"	=Love	
November 18	"Hatsukoi Shijo Shugi"	NMB48	
November 25	"Edge of Days"	Kis-My-Ft2	
December 2	"Watashi wo Tsukuru no wa Watashi / Zenzen Okiagarenai Sunday"	Angerme	
December 9	"Tomo yo"	Kanjani Eight	
December 16	"Hikari no Kehai"	KinKi Kids	
December 23	"Try Again"	Magic Prince	
December 30	"Restart"	Mameshiba no Taigun	

== See also ==
- List of Oricon number-one albums of 2019
