= Mamequest =

Studio album by Mameshiba no Taigun
- Released: February 22, 2023
- Length: 37:10
- Language: Japanese
- Label: WACK, Avex Trax

Mameshiba no Taigun chronology
Wow!! Season (2021)	Mamequest (2023)

Mamequest is the third studio album from Japanese girl group Mameshiba no Taigun. It was released on February 22, 2023, by Avex Trax. The album has ten tracks.

== Track listing ==
No.	Title	Lyrics	Music	Length
1.	"Mameshiba on the Stage"		Hi-yunk	1:11
2.	"Must Go"	JxSxK	Hi-yunk	4:02
3.	"Marama-ra" (マラマーラ)	Aika the Spy, Miyukiangel, Nao of Nao, Momoti Ngale, Hi-yunk	Hi-yunk	3:08
4.	"D.E.A.D"	Tarō Kohata	Tarō Kohata	5:03
5.	"Kill Me Holy Slowly"	Seiko Oomori	Seiko Oomori	3:54
6.	"Re:Birth"	Mameshiba no Taigun, Hisashi Sudo	Hisashi Sudo	4:40
7.	"Yatta! Clear da! Omedeto!" (やったぁ!クリアだ!おめでとぉ!)	Kenichi Maeyamada	Kenichi Maeyamada	3:38
8.	"Atatakakutene Tsumetaiyoruwokoete" (暖かくてね冷たい夜を越えて)	Ryujin Kiyoshi	Ryujin Kiyoshi	3:29
9.	"Sakurairo" (桜色)	Hanaemonster, Kaedephoenix	Kenta Matsukuma	3:53
10.	"Must Change -We Keep Changing-"	Mameshiba no Taigun	Hi-yunk	4:08
Total length:				37:10

== Charts ==
Chart	Peak position
Japanese Albums (Oricon)	8
Japanese Albums (Billboard)	12
