= Wow!! Season =

EP by Mameshiba no Taigun
- Released: July 14, 2021
- Length: 20:36
- Language: Japanese
- Label: WACK, Avex Trax

Mameshiba no Taigun chronology
Mamejor! (2021)	Wow!! Season (2021)	Mamequest (2023)

Wow!! Season (Wow!!シーズン) is the first extended play from Japanese girl group Mameshiba no Taigun. It was released on July 14, 2021, by Avex Trax. The album has six tracks.

== Track listing ==
No.	Title	Lyrics	Music	Length
1.	"Mame Summer" (まめサマー!?)	Kuro-chan	Kenta Matsukuma	3:51
2.	"Hahire Mameshiba" (走れ豆柴)	Miyukiangel	Kenta Matsukuma	3:38
3.	"Put Your Hands Up"	JxSxK	Kenta Matsukuma	3:10
4.	"Dead Inside"	Miyukiangel	Oni	3:20
5.	"Kimi to Mōsō" (君と妄想)	Miyukiangel	Satoshi Toyozumi	3:42
6.	"Mahō no Kotoba" (魔法の言葉)	Nao of Nao, Hanaemonster, Miyukiangel	Kenta Matsukuma	2:53
Total length:				20:36

== Charts ==
Chart	Peak position
Japanese Albums (Oricon)	8
Japanese Albums (Billboard)	13
