= Empire Originals =

EP by Empire
- Released: September 5, 2018
- Genre: J-pop
- Length: 20:18
- Language: Japanese
- Label: WACK; Avex

Empire chronology
The Empire Strikes Start!! (2018)	Empire Originals (2018)	The Great Journey Album (2019)

Empire Originals is the first extended play from Japanese girl group Empire. It was released on September 5, 2018, by Avex. The album consists of five tracks.

== Track listing ==
No.	Title	Lyrics	Music	Length
1.	"Empire originals"	JxSxK	Kenta Matsukuma	4:44
2.	"S.O.S"	Amano Hayashi	Kenta Matsukuma	4:36
3.	"Dope"	Mayu Empire	Kenta Matsukuma	3:46
4.	"So I Ya"	JxSxK, Maho Empire	Kenta Matsukuma	3:36
5.	"Talk about"	Yuka Empire	You-oh Oki	3:40
Total length:				20:18

== Charts ==
Chart	Peak position
Japanese Albums (Oricon)	8
Japanese Albums (Billboard)	4
