= Super Cool EP =

EP by Empire
- Released: August 5, 2020
- Genre: J-pop
- Length: 28:09
- Language: Japanese
- Label: WACK; Avex

Empire chronology
The Great Journey Album (2019)	Super Cool EP (2020)	Bright Future (2021)

Super Cool EP is the second extended play from Japanese girl group Empire. It was released on August 5, 2020, by Avex. The album consists of seven tracks.

== Track listing ==
No.	Title	Lyrics	Music	Length
1.	"This is Empire Sounds"	JxSxK	Kenta Matsukuma	3:28
2.	"Super Feeling Good"	Mayu Empire	Kenta Matsukuma	4:20
3.	"Clumsy"	Maho Empire, Midoriko Empire, Kenta Matsukuma	Kenta Matsukuma	4:18
4.	"I don't cry anymore"	Mayu Empire	Oni	3:52
5.	"I have to go"	Maho Empire	Goro Miyazaki	3:13
6.	"Can you hear me?"	Mayu Empire	Kenta Matsukuma	4:25
7.	"Ordinary"	JxSxK	Kenta Matsukuma	4:39

== Charts ==
Chart	Peak position
Japanese Albums (Oricon)	8
Japanese Albums (Billboard)	9
