= The Great Journey Album =

Studio album by Empire
- Released: December 18, 2019
- Length: 44:09
- Language: Japanese
- Label: WACK; Avex Trax

Empire chronology
Empire Originals (2018)	The Great Journey Album (2019)	Super Cool EP (2020)

The Great Journey Album is the second studio album from Japanese girl group Empire. It was released on December 18, 2019, by Avex Trax. The album consists of ten tracks.

== Track listing ==
All music composed by Kenta Matsukuma.

No.	Title	Lyrics	Length
1.	"Have it my way"	Maho Empire, Midoriko Empire, Yu-ki Empire	4:25
2.	"We are the World"	JxSxK	3:39
3.	"Pierce" (ピアス)	JxSxK, Kenta Matsukuma	4:33
4.	"A journey"	JxSxK	4:35
5.	"Right Now"	JxSxK	3:33
6.	"Kitto Kimi to" (きっと君と)	Maho Empire	4:42
7.	"Success Story"	JxSxK, Kenta Matsukuma	3:49
8.	"New World"	Mayu Empire	3:46
9.	"Magarikunetta Michi no" (曲がりくねった道の)	Maho Empire, Now Empire	3:40
10.	"I have a chance!!"	Empire	4:18
Total length:			44:09

== Charts ==
Chart	Peak position
Japanese Albums (Oricon)	6
Japanese Albums (Billboard)	7
