= Dress to Kill (ExWhyZ album) =

Studio album by ExWhyZ
- Released: March 20, 2024
- Genre: J-pop
- Length: 34:59
- Language: Japanese
- Label: WACK; EMI Records

ExWhyZ chronology
How High? (2023)	Dress to Kill (2024)	Sweet & Sour (2024)

Dress to Kill is the third studio album from Japanese idol group ExWhyZ. It is marketed as a "variety album" and was released on March 20, 2024, by EMI Records. The album consists of ten tracks including the songs "As you wish" and "Unknown Sense" which were previously released as digital singles, a cover of Shinichi Osawa's "Our Song", four remixes, an English version of "Obsession" from their debut album, XYZ, and a new song called "Fleeting".

== Track listing ==
Dress to Kill track listing
No.	Title	Lyrics	Music	Length
1.	"Dresscode"		Seiho	1:21
2.	"Unknown Sense"	Maho	Josef Mattias Melin, Cecilia Ellen Kallin	3:10
3.	"Our Song"	Akihiro Namba	Shinichi Osawa	4:41
4.	"Secret Secret (Shin Sakiura Remix)"			3:27
5.	"Answer (Seiho Remix)"			3:41
6.	"4:00 a.m (80Kidz Remix)"			2:53
7.	"Obsession (English Ver.)"	Jamesy Minimal, Kanata Okajima	80Kidz, Maika Loubte	3:16
8.	"D.Y.D (Miru Shinoda, Kento Yamada Remix)"			3:35
9.	"As you wish"	JxSxK	Oni	5:10
10.	"Fleeting"	Maho, Mayu	Kurihara Akatsuki, Tasuku Maeda	3:41
Total length:				34:59

== Charts ==
=== Weekly charts ===
Weekly chart performance for Dress to Kill
Chart	Peak position	
Chart	Japanese Albums (Oricon)	8
Japanese Hot Albums (Billboard)	7	
