= 2024 in Asia =

This is a list of events that took place in Asia in 2024.

== Incumbents ==
=== Afghanistan ===
(Afghanistan)

=== Armenia ===
(Armenia)

=== Azerbaijan ===
(Azerbaijan)

=== Bahrain ===
(Bahrain)

=== Bangladesh ===
(Bangladesh)

=== Bhutan ===
(Bhutan)

=== Brunei ===
(Brunei)

=== Cambodia ===
(Cambodia)

=== China ===
(China)

=== Cyprus ===
(Cyprus)

=== Georgia ===
(Georgia (country))

=== India ===
(India)

=== Indonesia ===
(Indonesia)

=== Iran ===
(Iran)

=== Iraq ===
(Iraq)

=== Israel ===
(Israel)

=== Japan ===
(Japan)

=== Jordan ===
(Jordan)

=== Kazakhstan ===
(Kazakhstan)

=== Kuwait ===
(Kuwait)

=== Kyrgyzstan ===
(Kyrgyzstan)

=== Laos ===
(Laos)

=== Lebanon ===
(Lebanon)

=== Malaysia ===
(Malaysia)

=== Maldives ===
(Maldives)

=== Mongolia ===
(Mongolia)

=== Myanmar ===
(Myanmar)

=== Nepal ===
(Nepal)

=== North Korea ===
(North Korea)

=== Oman ===
(Oman)

=== Pakistan ===
(Pakistan)

=== Palestine ===
(Palestine)

=== Philippines ===
(Philippines)

=== Qatar ===
(Qatar)

=== Russia ===
(Russia)

=== Saudi Arabia ===
(Saudi Arabia)

=== Singapore ===
(Singapore)

=== South Korea ===
(South Korea)

=== Sri Lanka ===
(Sri Lanka)

=== Syria ===
(Syria)

=== Taiwan ===
(Taiwan)

=== Tajikistan ===
(Tajikistan)

=== Thailand ===
(Thailand)

=== Timor-Leste ===
(Timor-Leste)

=== Turkey ===
(Turkey)

=== Turkmenistan ===
(Turkmenistan)

=== United Arab Emirates ===
(United Arab Emirates)

=== Uzbekistan ===
(Uzbekistan)

=== Vietnam ===
(Vietnam)

=== Yemen ===
(Yemen)

== Events ==
=== January ===
- 1 January
  - Egypt, Iran and the United Arab Emirates become BRICS members.
  - The Republic of Artsakh is formally dissolved as Nagorno-Karabakh unifies with Azerbaijan.
  - A 7.5 Mww earthquake struck the western coast of Japan, killing at least 244 people and injuring 1,297 others.
- 2 January – A further five were killed when a Coast Guard aircraft carrying humanitarian aid collides with a Japan Airlines passenger jet, destroying both aircraft. All 379 people aboard the passenger jet were evacuated safely.
- 3 January – 2024 Kerman bombings: An Islamic State double bombing kills 94 people during a memorial event commemorating the assassination of Qasem Soleimani in Kerman, Iran.
- 7 January – 2024 Bangladeshi general election: The Awami League, led by incumbent Sheikh Hasina, wins a fourth consecutive term amid protests by opposition parties and a large drop in voter turnout.
- 9 January – Second round of 2023–24 Bhutanese National Assembly election
- 13 January – 2024 Taiwanese general election
- 19 January – Japan becomes the fifth country to achieve a soft landing on the Moon, with its SLIM mission.
- 25 January – 2024 Nepalese National Assembly election
- 31 January – Sultan of Johor Ibrahim Iskandar ascends to the throne as the 17th Yang di-Pertuan Agong of Malaysia.

=== February ===
- 2 February – The US launches airstrikes on 85 targets in Iraq and Syria in response to a deadly drone attack on a US military base.
- 7 February – 2024 Azerbaijani presidential election: Amid an opposition boycott, President Ilham Aliyev is reelected to a fifth term.
- 8 February – 2024 Pakistani general election: Independent politicians, most of whom are members of the banned political party Pakistan Tehreek-e-Insaf, win a plurality of seats in the National Assembly.
- 14 February – 2024 Indonesian general election: Prabowo Subianto wins the presidential election, and the Democratic Party of Struggle wins the most votes in the legislative election.

=== March ===
- 1 March – 2024 Iranian legislative election
- 15–17 March – 2024 Russian presidential election

=== April ===
- 1 April – Israel attacks the Iranian embassy in Damascus, killing 16 people.
- 3 April – A powerful earthquake with a magnitude of 7.4 strikes off the eastern coast of Taiwan, with small tsunamis reaching heights of 20–30 cm (7.9–11.8 in) hitting Okinawa Prefecture, Japan.
- 4 April – 2024 Kuwaiti general election
- 10 April – 2024 South Korean legislative election: The Democratic Party and Democratic Alliance wins 176 seats, while the People Power and People Future, to which President Yoon Suk Yeol belongs, wins only 108 seats.
- 16 April – 2024 Persian Gulf floods: At least 32 people are killed when heavy rainfall strikes the Middle East, causing flash flooding. This caused many disruptions for the airline Emirates at Dubai International Airport.
- 19 April – 2024 Indian general election: Indians begin voting to elect members to the 18th Lok Sabha. With 968 million people eligible to vote, this election is expected to be the largest election in history. Voting will continue in a total of seven phases, lasting until June.
- 21 April – 2024 Maldivian parliamentary election

=== May ===
- 10 May – The United Nations General Assembly passed a resolution to grant the State of Palestine the right to be seated among member states in alphabetical order. This will go into effect at the next session of the UN General Assembly on 10 September 2024.
- 15 May – Lee Hsien Loong, Prime Minister of Singapore since 2004, is succeeded by former Deputy Prime Minister Lawrence Wong as prime minister, ahead of the next general election in 2025.
- 19 May – Iranian President Ebrahim Raisi and Iranian Foreign Minister Hossein Amir-Abdollahian were killed, along with seven other passengers and crew, in a helicopter crash near the Azerbaijan–Iran border.
- 22 May – May 2024 Vietnamese presidential election

=== June ===
- 9–26 June – 2024 Thai Senate election
- 23 June – 2024 Hajj disaster: More than 1,300 people are reported to have died due to extreme heat during the annual Hajj pilgrimage in Mecca, Saudi Arabia.
- 28 June
  - 2024 Iranian presidential election (first round).
  - 2024 Mongolian parliamentary election.

=== July ===
- 5 July – 2024 Iranian presidential election: Masoud Pezeshkian is elected president of Iran.
- 15 July – 2024 Syrian parliamentary election
- 19 July – 75 people are killed during the 2024 Bangladesh quota reform movement. The government of Bangladesh imposes a curfew.
- 23 July – China brokers a unity agreement between rival Palestinian factions Fatah and Hamas to form a single government.
- 30 July
  - At least 334 people are killed, over 200 injured and 281 missing following landslides in Wayanad district, Kerala, India.
  - Israel carries out an airstrike in the Dahieh suburb of Beirut, killing Hezbollah commander Fuad Shukr, who it accused of ordering the Majdal Shams attack.
- 31 July – Ismail Haniyeh, the political leader of Hamas, is assassinated at his residence in Tehran, Iran.

=== August ===
- 1 August – 2024 American–Russian prisoner exchange: Twenty-six individuals are released from Ankara Esenboğa Airport in a prisoner exchange between the United States and Russia.
- 5 August – Prime Minister of Bangladesh Sheikh Hasina announces her resignation and flees to India following nationwide protests.
- 6 August – Yahya Sinwar, Hamas' leader in the Gaza Strip, is appointed as the chairman of Hamas' political bureau.
- 7 August – The Move Forward Party is dissolved and Pita Limjaroenrat, alongside other senior politicians from the party, are banned from politics by the Constitutional Court of Thailand.
- 8 August – Nobel laureate Muhammad Yunus assumes office as Chief Adviser of an interim government formed after Sheikh Hasina's resignation in Bangladesh.
- 14 August – The Constitutional Court of Thailand dismisses the Prime Minister Srettha Thavisin for illegally appointing a minister to his cabinet who had a prison sentence. Paetongtarn Shinawatra succeeds him as Prime Minister of Thailand.
- 17 August – Indonesia's 79th Independence Day celebration is held in Nusantara. The celebration is supposed to inaugurate Nusantara as the new capital of Indonesia, but this does not occur due to delays.
- 25 August – The Israel Defense Forces begin a series of preemptive strikes against targets in the south of Lebanon.
- 31 August – A helicopter crashed in Kamchatka Krai, Russia, killing all 22 occupants on board.

=== September ===
- 10 September – 2024 Jordanian general election
- 17 – 18 September – Thirty-two people are killed and more than 3,200 are injured after pagers and walkie-talkies used by Hezbollah militants and medics explode in two massive cyberattacks. Israel is the presumed perpetrator.
- 20 September – Israel assassinates Hezbollah leader Ibrahim Aqil and ten other senior leaders in Beirut following an intensification of fighting between Israel and Hezbollah in the wake of the pager explosions that occurred earlier in the week.
- 21 September – 2024 Sri Lankan presidential election: Anura Kumara Dissanayake is elected President of Sri Lanka, with a second round of vote counting held for the first time in Sri Lanka's history.
- 23 September – The deadliest day of the Hezbollah–Israel conflict since 2006 occurs, with 569 people killed and 1,835 wounded by Israeli airstrikes in Lebanon.
- 27 September – The Israeli Air Force bombs the central headquarters of Hezbollah in Beirut, killing several people, including Hezbollah leader Hassan Nasrallah.

=== October ===
- 1 October
  - The Israel Defense Forces invade southern Lebanon, escalating its conflict against Hezbollah.
  - The Japanese parliament elects Shigeru Ishiba as the new prime minister of Japan, with members from the Liberal Democratic Party forming the majority. Following his appointment, he reveals his cabinet and calls for a snap election on October 27, securing a national mandate.
  - Iran attacks Israel with ballistic missiles as a response to Israel's assassination of Hassan Nasrallah and Ismail Haniyeh.
- 6 October – The 2024 Kazakh nuclear power referendum is held and approved.
- 16 October – Yahya Sinwar, leader of Hamas, is killed in a gunfight with Israeli forces in Rafah.
- 21 October – October 2024 Vietnamese presidential election: The National Assembly of Vietnam elects Lương Cường as the new president of Vietnam. He replaced Tô Lâm, who was formally appointed as the general secretary of the Communist Party.
- 27 October
  - 2024 Japanese general election: The governing LDP loses its parliamentary majority for the first time since 2009, but still wins the most seats. The CDP wins its best result in party history.
  - 2024 Uzbek parliamentary election

=== November ===
- 9 November – A suicide bombing at the Quetta railway station in Balochistan, Pakistan kills at least 26 people. The bombing was orchestrated by the Balochistan Liberation Army (BLA), and is the first time that the organization had attacked the center of Quetta.
- 14 November – 2024 Sri Lankan parliamentary election: President Anura Kumara Dissanayake's National People's Power coalition wins a supermajority in the 17th Parliament of Sri Lanka.
- 26 November – Israeli Prime Minister Benjamin Netanyahu announces that a ceasefire deal has been agreed to end fighting with Hezbollah in Lebanon.
- 30 November – Syrian civil war: Opposition forces seize control of most of Aleppo, Syria, prompting the first Russian airstrikes on the city since 2016.

=== December ===
- 3 December – South Korean President Yoon Suk Yeol declares martial law during a late-night address broadcast live on YTN television, accusing the country's main opposition Democratic Party of sympathizing with North Korea and engaging in anti-state activities. The martial law was lifted by the National Assembly the following day.
- 8 December – Syrian civil war: President of Syria Bashar al-Assad leaves Damascus after being overthrown, ending his presidency and the Ba'athist Syria regime after a total of 61 years. The Syrian opposition forms the Syrian Transitional Government as a provisional government.
- 12 December – Indian chess prodigy Gukesh Dommaraju defeats former world champion Ding Liren in the 2024 World Chess Championship, breaking the previous age record of 22 set by Garry Kasparov by becoming champion at 18 years, 195 days old.
- 14 December
  - 2024 Georgian presidential election: Mikheil Kavelashvili of People's Power is elected unopposed.
  - South Korean President Yoon Suk Yeol's powers and duties are suspended after MPs vote to impeach him, following his martial law declaration the previous week.
- 27 December – Acting President of South Korea Han Duck-soo is impeached by MPs for failing to promulgate two bills related to president Yoon's legal proceedings. He is succeeded by deputy prime minister Choi Sang-mok.
- 29 December – Jeju Air Flight 2216, a Boeing 737-800 passenger flight from Bangkok Suvarnabhumi Airport in Bangkok, Thailand, to Muan International Airport in Muan, South Korea, veered off the runway at Muan International Airport and crashed into a barrier, killing at least 179 people. Two injured survivors were reported.

== See also ==
- 2024 in Asian music
- List of state leaders in 2024 § Asia
