= Bright Future (Empire album) =

Studio album by Empire
- Released: November 10, 2021
- Genre: J-pop
- Length: 45:19
- Language: Japanese
- Labels: WACK; Avex

Empire chronology
Super Cool EP (2020)	Bright Future (2021)	The Final Empire (2022)

Bright Future is the third studio album from Japanese girl group Empire. It was released on November 10, 2021, by Avex. The album consists of thirteen tracks.

== Track listing ==
No.	Title	Lyrics	Music	Length
1.	"Let's Show"	Maho Empire	Yunosy	2:45
2.	"Chase your back"	JxSxK	Kenta Matsukuma	3:56
3.	"Iza!!"	JxSxK	Seiho	3:26
4.	"Happy with you"	JxSxK	Kenta Matsukuma	3:35
5.	"I don't care"	Mikina Empire, Mayu Empire	Kenta Matsukuma	2:57
6.	"Error"	Maho Empire	Oni	3:21
7.	"Haggling"	Maho Empire	Oni	4:22
8.	"To continue"	JxSxK	Kenta Matsukuma	3:44
9.	"Fly! Sing! Cry! Try! Smile!"	Yu-ki Empire	Kenta Matsukuma	3:39
10.	"Hey!Hey!"	Mikina Empire, Mayu Empire	Kenta Matsukuma	2:19
11.	"Hon-no"	JxSxK	Kenta Matsukuma	3:52
12.	"Rather"	Mayu Empire, Midoriko Empire	Oni	3:26
13.	"Ring to the Bright Future"	Mayu Empire	Kenta Matsukuma	3:48
Total length:				45:19

== Charts ==
Chart	Peak position
Japanese Albums (Oricon)	6
Japanese Albums (Billboard)	7
