= Terminal Disease of ASP =

Studio album by ASP
- Released: October 2, 2024
- Genre: J-pop
- Length: 42:04
- Language: Japanese
- Label: WACK; Avex Trax

ASP chronology
Delicious Vicious (2023)	Terminal Disease of ASP (2024)

Singles from Terminal Disease of ASP
- 1. "Hyper Cracker" Released: August 31, 2022; 2. "I Won't Let You Go" Released: November 30, 2022; 3. "No Color S" Released: March 27, 2023; 4. "I Hate U" Released: August 9, 2023; 5. "Heaven's Seven" Released: January 17, 2024; 6. "Black Nails" Released: May 1, 2024

Terminal Disease of ASP is the third studio album from Japanese girl group ASP. It was released on October 2, 2024, by Avex Trax and consists of thirteen tracks.

== Track listing ==
No.	Title	Lyrics	Music	Length
1.	"Totsugeki!!!!!"	Ryugu Jiiku	AxSxE, Yohji Igarashi	3:52
2.	"Hyper Cracker"	Pecori	Pecori, Yohji Igarashi	3:16
3.	"Make a Move"	Sam Matlock	Sam Matlock	2:50
4.	"Anyway"	JW Undersex	Tomonari Sora, Yohji Igarashi	3:21
5.	"Black Nails"	Shimizu Eisuke, Jubee	AFJB	3:25
6.	"I Hate U"	Linna Figg	Linna Figg, Kyazm	2:58
7.	"No Color S"	JW Undersex	329	2:57
8.	"Darma"	Oikawa Chiharu	Age	2:48
9.	"I Won't Let You Go"	JW Undersex	329	2:53
10.	"Tokyo Sky Blues"	Pecori	Pecori, Yohji Igarashi	3:16
11.	"Heaven's Seven"	Pecori	Pecori, Yohji Igarashi	3:34
12.	"Toxic Invasion"	Pecori	Pecori	3:28
13.	"Too young to get it, too fast to live."	Nameless, JxSxK	Tomonari Sora, Yohji Igarashi	3:19
Total length:				42:04

== Charts ==
Chart	Peak position
Japanese Albums (Oricon)	6
Japanese Albums (Billboard)	6
