= How High? (EP) =

EP by ExWhyZ
- Released: October 18, 2023
- Genre: J-pop
- Length: 23:44
- Language: Japanese
- Label: WACK; Universal Music Japan

ExWhyZ chronology
Xanadu (2023)	How High? (2023)	Dress to Kill (2024)

How High? is the first extended play from Japanese girl group ExWhyZ. It was released on October 18, 2023, by Universal Music Japan. The album consists of seven tracks.

== Track listing ==
No.	Title	Lyrics	Music	Length
1.	"6Whyz"	Miru Shinoda, Kento Yamada	Miru Shinoda, Kento Yamada	2:57
2.	"Not Sorry"	Mayu, Akira	Shingo Kubota	4:13
3.	"Furachina Summer" (フラチナサマー)	JJJJhaeven, Kenmochi Hidefumi	Kenmochi Hidefumi	3:38
4.	"There's no limits"	Maika Loubté, Mayu, Mikina, Maho	80kidz	3:20
5.	"Toriko" (虜)	Asoboism	Seiho	3:10
6.	"Moonlight, Sunlight"	Maho	Denny White	3:00
7.	"Shall We"	Maho	Malin Christin, Kevin Cho, Jake Kim	3:22
Total length:				23:44

== Charts ==
Chart	Peak position
Japanese Albums (Oricon)	8
Japanese Albums (Billboard)	10
