= Mamejor! =

Studio album by Mameshiba no Taigun
- Released: January 20, 2021
- Length: 44:23
- Language: Japanese
- Label: WACK, Avex Trax

Mameshiba no Taigun chronology
Start (2020)	Mamejor! (2021)	Wow!! Season (2021)

Mamejor! (まめジャー!) is the second studio album from Japanese girl group Mameshiba no Taigun. It was released on January 20, 2021 by Avex Trax. The album has twelve tracks.

== Track listing ==
No.	Title	Lyrics	Music	Length
1.	"Onegai Kiss Me" (お願いキスミー)	Iku Ryūguuji	Kenta Matsukuma	3:48
2.	"Samabari" (サマバリ)	Kuro-chan	Kenta Matsukuma	3:51
3.	"Mame no Uta" (まめのうた)	Kenta Matsukuma, Kaede Phoenix	Kenta Matsukuma	3:54
4.	"Motion"	Mameshiba no Taigun	Kenta Matsukuma	3:39
5.	"Lucky!!"	Aika the Spy	Kenta Matsukuma	3:14
6.	"Daddy"	Miyuki Angel	Kenta Matsukuma	3:27
7.	"Koi no Kakezan ABCDEFG" (恋のかけ算 ABCDEFG)	Kuro-chan	Kenta Matsukuma	3:36
8.	"Kirawa Reta Yūki" (嫌われた勇気)	Kuro-chan	Kenta Matsukuma	3:55
9.	"Boku Dake No Kaitō" (僕だけの回答)	Hanae Monster	Kenta Matsukuma	3:12
10.	"Ima" (今)	JxSxK	Kenta Matsukuma	3:59
11.	"I need you"	JxSxK	Kenta Matsukuma	4:00
12.	"To The Future"	Miyuki Angel	You-oh Oki	3:45
Total length:				44:23

== Charts ==
Chart	Peak position
Japanese Albums (Oricon)	11
Japanese Albums (Billboard)	13
