= Xanadu (ExWhyZ album) =

Studio album by ExWhyZ
- Released: April 19, 2023
- Genre: J-pop
- Length: 38:59
- Language: Japanese
- Label: WACK; EMI Records

ExWhyZ chronology
XYZ (2022)	Xanadu (2023)	How High? (2023)

Xanadu is the second studio album from Japanese idol group ExWhyZ. It was released on April 19, 2023, by EMI Records. The album was preceded by three singles, "Answer", "Des Speeching", and "First Step". The album consists of eleven tracks.

== Track listing ==
Xanadu track listing
No.	Title	Lyrics	Music	Length
1.	"Xanadu"	Kento Yamada, Miru Shinoda	Kento Yamada, Miru Shinoda	1:19
2.	"Blaze"	Miru Shinoda, Kento Yamada, ExWhyZ	Miru Shinoda, Kento Yamada	3:19
3.	"Des Speeching"	Shinichi Osawa, Mayu, Maho, Midoriko	Shinichi Osawa	3:46
4.	"Answer"	Kanata Okajima	Seiho	3:16
5.	"First Step"	Now	Singo Kubota	3:27
6.	"Super Simple"	JxSxK	Denny White	3:29
7.	"Walk this way"	Maho	Yewon (Moof), Sunae (Moof), Louise Frick Sveen	3:25
8.	"Metronome" (メトロノーム)	KBSNK	KBSNK	3:33
9.	"Dive"	Sakura Shin, Mayu, Midoriko	Sakura Shin	4:08
10.	"Darling"	Maho, Mayu	Shingo Suzuki	4:15
11.	"Everything"	Miru Shinoda, Kento Yamada	Miru Shinoda, Kento Yamada	4:59
Total length:				38:59

== Charts ==
=== Weekly charts ===
Weekly chart performance for Xanadu
Chart	Peak position	
Chart	Japanese Albums (Oricon)	8
Japanese Combined Albums (Oricon)	8	
Japanese Hot Albums (Billboard)	7	

=== Monthly charts ===
Monthly chart performance for Xanadu
Chart (2023)	Peak position
Japanese Albums (Oricon)	21
