= The Empire Strikes Start!! =

Studio album by Empire
- Released: April 11, 2018
- Genre: J-pop
- Length: 47:39
- Language: Japanese
- Label: WACK; Avex

Empire chronology
The Empire Strikes Start!! (2018)	Empire Originals (2018)

The Empire Strikes Start!! is the debut studio album from Japanese girl group Empire. It was released on April 11, 2018, by Avex. The album consists of eleven tracks. The song "Black to the dreamlight" was used as the third closing theme for the anime Black Clover.

== Track listing ==
No.	Title	Lyrics	Music	Length
1.	"For Example??"	BeeViCee	Oni	4:20
2.	"Buttocks beat! beat!"	Hakei Tsubanebuyu Alumi Foil, Kenta Matsukuma,	Kenta Matsukuma	3:17
3.	"Black to the dreamlight"	Beat mint boyz	Kenta Matsukuma	5:47
4.	"Mad Love"	Fujun Sasaki	Kenta Matsukuma	4:42
5.	"Don't tell me why"	Yu-ki Empire	Kenta Matsukuma	3:35
6.	"Tokyo Moonlight"	Mayu Empire	Kenta Matsukuma	3:55
7.	"Empire is Coming"	Beat mint boyz	Kenta Matsukuma	3:27
8.	"Dead Body" (デッドバディ)	Iku Ryuguji	Kenta Matsukuma	4:09
9.	"Little Boy"	Yuka Empire	Kenta Matsukuma	4:58
10.	"Kono Sekai no Katasumi de" (コノ世界ノ片隅デ)	You-Oh Oki, Yuka Empire	You-Oh Oki	4:22
11.	"Akarui Mirai" (アカルイミライ)	JxSxK	Kenta Matsukuma	5:12
Total length:				47:39

== Charts ==
Chart	Peak position
Japanese Albums (Oricon)	7
Japanese Albums (Billboard)	4
