= Bite a Shock =

Japanese idol co-ed group

- Origin: Japan
- Genres: J-pop
- Years active: 2023–2026
- Label: WACK
- Past members: Mahito; Saori; Rina; Haruto; Ryuusei; Hanano
- Website: www.bishthenext.tokyo

Bite a Shock (stylized as BiTE A SHOCK) was a Japanese co-ed group formed as the successor of Bish through the reality survival show Bish The Next which aired on Nippon TV in 2023. The group disbanded on March 8, 2026.

== History ==
The final line-up of Bite a Shock was revealed on July 1, 2023. They released their first digital single, "Patient", on July 9, followed by their second digital single, "The Next", on July 24, and their third digital single, "Tokonatsu Planet", on August 16. Their fourth digital single, "Canopus", was released on November 8. They released their debut EP, Shockers, on December 20.

Their fifth digital single, "Ienai Kotoba", was released on May 15, 2024, followed by their sixth digital single, "Bokura no Ashiato", on July 1. They released their first major studio album, Bite a Shock the First, on August 14.

On July 16, 2025, they released their seventh digital single, "Ready Steady Blue".

On December 1, former WACK Representative Director Junnosuke Watanabe announced that he plans to start the "Second Chapter" of the company and disband Bite a Shock in 2026. The remaining members could participate in WACK's March 2026 audition camp or leave the company by 2027; however, none of them appeared in the camp.

On December 21, they revealed that they would disband on March 8, 2026, after their "FiNAL BiTE" live event. The group released their final digital single, "Dai Nan-ji Seishun", on January 28, 2026.

== Members ==
- Mahito (真人)
- Saori (沙織)
- Rina (梨菜)
- Haruto (暖人)
- Ryuusei (竜青)
- Hanano (はなの)

== Discography ==
=== Studio albums ===
Title	Album details	Peak chart positions
Title	Album details	Oricon
Bite a Shock the First	Released: August 14, 2024; Label: Avex Trax; Formats: CD, digital download	39

=== Extended plays ===
Title	Album details
Shockers	Released: December 20, 2023; Label: Avex Trax; Formats: CD, digital download

=== Singles ===
Title	Year	Album
"Patient"	2023	Bite a Shock the First
"The Next"	2023	Bite a Shock the First
"Tokonatsu Planet" (常夏プラネット)	2023	Bite a Shock the First
"Canopus" (カノープス)	2023	Bite a Shock the First
"Ienai Kotoba" (言えない言葉)	2024	Bite a Shock the First
"Bokura no Ashiato" (僕らの足跡)	2024	Bite a Shock the First
"Ready Steady Blue"	2025	Non-album singles
"Dai Nan-ji Seishun" (第何次青春)	2026	Non-album singles
