= Placebo (ASP album) =

Studio album by ASP
- Released: January 5, 2022
- Genre: J-pop
- Length: 42:40
- Language: Japanese
- Label: WACK

ASP chronology
Anal Sex Penis (2021)	Placebo (2022)	Delicious Vicious (2023)

Placebo is the second studio album from Japanese girl group ASP. It was released on January 5, 2022, by WACK and consists of thirteen tracks.

== Track listing ==
No.	Title	Lyrics	Music	Length
1.	"Hatred of Love"	JxSxK	Kenta Matsukuma	3:36
2.	"No Reason"	JxSxK, Kenta Matsukuma	Kenta Matsukuma	3:23
3.	"Gaze"	JxSxK	Kenta Matsukuma	3:30
4.	"Itsumo Kokokara"	JxSxK	Ichiro Iguchi	3:35
5.	"Majinai Desu." (マジ無いです。)	Junie Kanashimi	Kenta Matsukuma	2:21
6.	"Hibi Korekyo Munari" (日々是虚無也)	JxSxK, Kenta Matsukuma	Kenta Matsukuma	2:37
7.	"Wasted Tears"	Kenta Matsukuma, JxSxK	Kenta Matsukuma	3:23
8.	"Let's go as a weirdo"	Nameless	Yoko Nagai	3:37
9.	"Just Do it"	JxSxK	Kenta Matsukuma	2:05
10.	"You don't say"	Naayu	Kenta Matsukuma	3:38
11.	"I wanna live"	Naayu	Kenta Matsukuma	4:44
12.	"Itsudemo Fuck You❤️" (いつでもファッキュー❤️)	Mog Ryan	Iwade Masayuki	2:39
13.	"M"	JxSxK	Ichiro Iguchi	3:32
Total length:				42:40

== Charts ==
Chart	Peak position
Japanese Albums (Oricon)	6
Japanese Albums (Billboard)	8
