= Start (Mameshiba no Taigun album) =

Studio album by Mameshiba no Taigun
- Released: June 3, 2020
- Genre: J-pop
- Length: 49:20
- Language: Japanese
- Label: WACK, Tower Records

Mameshiba no Taigun chronology
Start (2020)	Mamejor! (2021)

Singles from Start
- 1. "Restart" Released: December 19, 2019; 2. "Rocket Start" Released: March 4, 2020; 3. "Daijōbu Sunrise" Released: March 4, 2020; 4. "Flash" Released: May 14, 2020; 5. "Donkusa Happy" Released: May 27, 2020

Start (スタート) is the debut studio album from Japanese girl group Mameshiba no Taigun. It was pre-released on June 3, 2020, and officially released on June 10, 2020 by Tower Records. The album has thirteen tracks, including the singles "Restart", "Rocket Start" and "Daijōbu Sunrise", and the digital singles "Flash" and "Donkusa Happy".

== Release ==
Start was initially scheduled for release on May 13, 2020, however it was delayed to June 10 due to the COVID-19 pandemic. The album was pre-released on June 3.

== Track listing ==
No.	Title	Lyrics	Music	Length
1.	"Mameshiba no Taigun Ookurisuruno Ha Zinseigekijou" (豆柴の大群- お送りするのは人生劇場-)	JxSxK, Kenta Matsukuma	Kenta Matsukuma	3:06
2.	"Flash"	JxSxK, Kenta Matsukuma	Kenta Matsukuma	3:31
3.	"Restart (2020 ver.)" (りスタート)	Kuro-chan	Kuro-chan	4:52
4.	"Donkusa Happy" (ドンクサハッピー)	Kuro-chan	Kenta Matsukuma	3:41
5.	"Rocket Start" (ろけっとすたーと)	Kuro-chan	Kuro-chan	4:11
6.	"Changes"	JxSxK, Kenta Matsukuma	Kenta Matsukuma	3:15
7.	"Sayonara Shinakya" (さよならしなきゃ)	Yoko Nagai	Momen	4:23
8.	"Boku ga Ii" (僕がいい)	Hanaemonster, Kenta Matsukuma	Kenta Matsukuma	3:30
9.	"Gardening" (ガーデニング)	Goro Miyazaki, Hanaemonster, JxSxK	Goro Miyazaki	3:39
10.	"Trust" (トラスト)	JxSxK, Kenta Matsukuma	Kenta Matsukuma	3:23
11.	"Soba ni Iteyo Baby angel" (そばにいてよ Baby angel)	JxSxK, Kenta Matsukuma	Kenta Matsukuma	3:51
12.	"Kimi Igai ni Motetai" (君以外にモテたい)	JxSxK, Misaki Saito	Misaki Saito	3:47
13.	"Daijōbu Sunrise" (大丈夫サンライズ)	JxSxK, Kenta Matsukuma	Kenta Matsukuma	4:17
Total length:				49:20

== Charts ==
Chart	Peak position
Japanese Albums (Oricon)	10
Japanese Albums (Billboard)	10
