= Kiss Kiss (Japanese group) =

Japanese girl group

- Origin: Japan
- Genre: J-pop
- Years active: 2023–present
- Label: WACK
- Spinoff of: Gang Parade
- Members: Naruhaworld; Kila May; Ca Non; Changbaby; Ainastar
- Past members: Potential
- Website: www.kisskiss.tokyo

Kiss Kiss (stylized as KiSS KiSS) is a Japanese girl group formed by WACK in 2023. They released their debut album, First Album, in June 2023. The group will disband in November 2026.

== History ==
On March 25, 2023, at the conclusion of WACK Audition Camp 2023 the formation of Kiss Kiss was announced. The group consists of six members of Gang Parade. Their first digital single, "Kisses", was released on April 17. On June 21, they released their debut album, First Album. On December 18, they released the digital single "Cake!".

On January 15, 2024, they released the digital single "Choco Kiss!!", followed by "Fanfare" on March 18, and "Kimi no Ichiban ni Naritakute" on May 20. On March 27, they performed at The Underworld in London alongside ASP and Gang Parade. On July 16, Potential graduated from Kiss Kiss. On August 23, they released the digital single, "Rakuen Cutopia♡". On November 13, they released the digital single, "Hotchu!".

On February 10, 2025, the digital single "Kawaī Nante Iwanaide" was released. On March 26, they performed at The Underworld in London in the fifth edition of WACK in the UK. On May 3, the digital single, "Nantatte Suki!", was released. On August 9, the digital single, "Kiss Float", was released.

On December 1, former WACK Representative Director Junnosuke Watanabe announced that he plans to start the "Second Chapter" of the company and disband Kiss Kiss in 2026. The remaining members could participate in WACK's March 2026 audition camp or leave the company by 2027; however, none of them appeared in the camp.

On March 14, 2026, the digital single "Sukitrip" was released.

From May 21 to November 5, they embarked on their final live tour, Kiss Kiss Happy Birchu!!♡Day Tour, with all five dates and accompanying digital singles celebrating a member's birthday. "Kakugoshite Heart Neraiuchi♡", a digital single dedicated to Kila May, was released on May 31. "BabunbaBunba!" and "September Kiss" followed, the former made for Changbaby's birthday and the latter, Ca Non's birthday. They were released respectively on August 21 and September 3.

They will disband on November 30, 2026.

== Members ==
=== Current ===
- Naruhaworld (ナルハワールド)
- Kila May (キラ・メイ)
- Ca Non (キャ・ノン)
- Changbaby (チャンベイビー)
- Ainastar (アイナスター)

=== Former ===
- Potential (カ能セイ, Kanōsei)

== Discography ==
=== Studio albums ===
Title	Album details	Peak chart positions	
Title	Album details	Oricon	Billboard
First Album	Released: June 21, 2023; Label: WACK Records; Formats: CD, digital download	4	3

=== Singles ===
Title	Year	Peak chart positions	Album
Title	Year	Oricon	Album
"Kisses"	2023	—	First Album
"Cake!"	2023	—	Non-album singles
"Choco Kiss!!" (チョコキス！！)	2024	—	Non-album singles
"Fanfare" (ファンファーレ)	2024	—	Non-album singles
"Kimi no Ichiban ni Naritakute" (キミのいちばんになりたくて)	2024	—	Non-album singles
"Rakuen Cutopia♡" (楽園きゅ〜とぴあ♡)	2024	—	Non-album singles
"Hotchu!" (ほっちゅ！)	2024	—	Non-album singles
"Kawaī Nante Iwanaide" (かわいいなんて言わないで)	2025	—	Non-album singles
"Nantatte Suki!" (なんたって好き！)	2025	—	Non-album singles
"Kiss Float" (キスフロート)	2025	—	Non-album singles
"Sukitrip" (スキトリップ)	2026	—	Non-album singles
"Kakugoshite Heart Neraiuchi♡" (覚悟して！ハート狙い撃ち♡)	2026	—	Non-album singles
"BabunbaBunba!" (ばぶんばぶんば！)	2026	—	Non-album singles
"September Kiss"	2026	—	Non-album singles
"—" denotes releases that did not chart or were not released in that region.

== Concerts and tours ==
=== Tours ===
- Gimme Kiss Tour (2023)
- Melty Kiss Tour (2023)
- Invitation Kiss Tour (2024)
- Kiss Kiss WACKful Free Tour (2024)
- Want you!! Tour (2024)
- Want you!! Girls Free Tour (2024)
- Kiss Kiss Dream Trip Tour (2026)
- Kiss Kiss Happy Birchu!!♡Day Tour (2026)

=== Concerts ===
- Gimme Kiss Tour More Kiss (2023)
- Hug and Kiss (2024)
- Kiss×2 you Kiss (2025)
- Kiss Kiss Holy Night (2025)
- Kiss Kiss no Nankurunai-chu♡ Trip (2026)
- Kiss You Goodbye (2026)
