= Restart (Mameshiba no Taigun song) =

Single by Mameshiba no Taigun

from the album Start
- Language: Japanese
- Released: December 19, 2019
- Genre: J-pop
- Length: 4:51
- Label: Tower Records

Mameshiba no Taigun singles chronology
"Restart" (2019)	"Rocket Start" (2020)

Music video
- "Restart" on YouTube

"Restart" (りスタート) is the debut single by Japanese girl group Mameshiba no Taigun, released on December 19, 2019, by Tower Records. The song was written and composed by Kuro-chan and arranged by Scrambles. The single sold 68,219 copies in its first week of release and topped the Oricon Singles Chart.

== Charts ==
Chart (2029)	Peak position
Oricon Singles Chart (Oricon)	1
Japan Hot 100 (Billboard)	3
