= ASP (Japanese group) =

Japanese idol girl group

- Origin: Japan
- Genres: J-pop
- Years active: 2021–2026
- Labels: WACK; Avex Trax
- Past members: Nameless; Matilder Twins; Wonker Twins; Riontown; Iko Mugennokanata; Naayu; Mog Ryan; Yumeka Nowkana?; CCCCCC
- Website: asp-japan.tokyo

ASP was a Japanese alternative idol girl group formed by WACK in 2021. They debuted with the studio album, Anal Sex Penis, in 2021. The group disbanded in May 2026.

== History ==
=== 2021: Debut with Anal Sex Penis ===
On March 27, 2021, WACK announced that a new group, ASP, had been formed. Initially the members faces were hidden until they reached 20,000 followers on Twitter. Eventually after the gradual reveal of their faces the members were confirmed to be former Idol Renaissance and Carry Loose member Yumeka Nowkana?, former Wagg trainee Naayu, Nameless and Mog Ryan. They released their debut studio album, Anal Sex Penis, on May 26. They performed live for the first time on May 30 at Nakano Heavy Sick Zero in Tokyo, and held their first tour, the ASP's on Fire Tour, from June to July. Their second tour, Tour Starfuckers, was held in August. Their first single, "The Man Calling", was released on September 22. Their third tour, the March of Rogues Tour, was held from October to November. On November 24, the final date of the tour, Naayu left ASP due to a worsening foot injury. During Naayu's final live show with the group, ASP introduced twin sisters, Matilder and Wonker, as new members.

=== 2022: Placebo and major label debut ===
They released their second studio album, Placebo, on January 5, 2022. Their fourth tour, the Redo Beginning Tour, was held in January. On February 21, they performed a live show called Anti Social Pains at Zepp DiverCity in Tokyo. In March, their fifth tour, Sorry!! It's only for girls, which was a woman only event was held. On March 26, it was announced that former HKT48 member Kaede Kamijima; now known as CCCCCC, and Riontown, would join the group on May 7. Their second single, "Bollocks", was released on April 13. On May 24, they released their first digital single "Haikei Rockstarsama 2022". From May to July they held their sixth tour, the Acoustic Sad Orchestra Tour. They made their major label debut with their third single, "Hyper Cracker", through Avex Trax on August 31. On September 2, they held a 24-hour live event called 24 Hours Anarchy Anarchy Shit Shit Party People at Yokohama Bay Hall in Kanagawa to commemorate their major label debut. From September to December, they held their seventh tour, the God Save the ASP Tour. On November 30, they released their second digital single "I Won't Let You Go".

=== 2023–2024: Delicious Vicious and Terminal Disease of ASP ===
From January to March 2023, they held their eighth tour, a woman and students only tour titled For girls and students from ASP. They released their third digital single, "No Color S", on March 27. They released their first EP, Delicious Vicious, on April 26. From April to July, they held their ninth tour, the Killing ASP Tour. Their fourth single, "I Hate U", was released on August 9. From August to October, they held their tenth tour, the But I Love You Tour. On November 16, ASP performed at The Underworld in London alongside ExWhyZ and AinatoAoi (a duo consisting of Aina the End and dancer Aoi Yamada), as part of WACK's first multi-artist concert to be held outside of Japan. From November to December, they held their eleventh tour, a free entry tour titled Actually Free but You must come Yaon Tour

They released their fifth single, "Heaven's Seven", on January 17, 2024. On March 27, they performed in London again alongside Gang Parade and Kiss Kiss. From April to May, they held their twelfth tour, March with Rogues to Budokan. Their sixth single, "Black Nails", was released on May 1. From May to September, they performed a forty-seven show tour in forty-six locations across Japan. ASP performed in London for the third time alongside Bis and Mameshiba no Taigun Tonai Bousho a.k.a. MonsterIdol on August 28. They released their third studio album, Terminal Disease of ASP, on October 2. On October 8, they performed at the Nippon Budokan in a live show called We are in Budokan "The floor is all ours!!". They performed in London for the fourth time alongside ExWhyZ and Mameshiba no Taigun Tonai Bousho a.k.a. MonsterIdol on November 27.

=== 2025: Touring and line-up changes ===
On March 26, 2025, they performed at The Underworld in London in the fifth edition of WACK in the UK. On May 3, former Bis member Iko Mugennokanata joined the group and ASP began the Acid Suspicious Parental Tour. They released their fourth digital single, "Get New Mirai", on May 4. On June 5, they performed at The Underworld in London in the sixth edition of WACK in the UK Their seventh single, "Ba-by", was released on August 20. In September, ASP embarked on a UK tour with dates in Bristol, Manchester, and London. Mog Ryan and Yumeka Nowkana? left ASP at the end of their UK tour.

On November 7, ASP announced CCCCCC's departure; she left the group during the finale of the ASP CRUSH Tour 2025 on December 14.

On December 1, former WACK Representative Director Junnosuke Watanabe announced that he plans to start the "Second Chapter" of the company and disband ASP in 2026. The remaining members could participate in WACK's 2026 audition camp or leave the company by 2027.

On December 26, ASP announced their eighth and final single, "Pipe Dream".

=== 2026: Pipe Dream and This is ASP’s final tour ===
ASP released "Pipe Dream" on January 14.

On March 22, Nameless participated in the WACK Joint Audition 2026 camp and was eliminated that day.

From April 4 to May 4, ASP held their seventeenth tour, named This is ASP’s final tour; the group disbanded on its last leg.

== Members ==
=== Final Line-up ===
- Nameless (ナ前ナ以, Namaenai)
- Matilder Twins (マチルダー・ツインズ)
- Wonker Twins (ウォンカー・ツインズ)
- Riontown (リオンタウン)
- Iko Mugennokanata (イコ・ムゲンノカナタ)

=== Former ===
- Naayu (ナアユ)
- Mog Ryan (モグ・ライアン)
- Yumeka Nowkana? (ユメカ・ナウカナ？)
- CCCCCC (チッチチチーチーチー)

== Discography ==
=== Studio albums ===
| Title | Album details | Peak chart positions | |
| Title | Album details | Oricon | Billboard |
|---|---|---|---|
| Anal Sex Penis | Released: May 26, 2021; Label: WACK; Formats: CD, digital download | 13 | 13 |
| Placebo | Released: January 5, 2022; Label: WACK; Formats: CD, digital download | 6 | 8 |
| Terminal Disease of ASP | Released: October 2, 2024; Label: Avex Trax; Formats: CD, digital download | 6 | 6 |

=== Extended plays ===
| Title | Album details | Peak chart positions | | Sales |
| Title | Album details | Oricon | Billboard | Sales |
|---|---|---|---|---|
| Delicious Vicious | Released: April 26, 2023; Label: Avex Trax; Formats: CD, digital download | 7 | 6 | JPN: 8,322 |

=== Singles ===
==== As lead artist ====
| Title | Year | Peak chart positions | | Album |
| Title | Year | Oricon | Billboard | Album |
|---|---|---|---|---|
| "The Man Calling" | 2021 | 17 | — | Non-album singles |
| "Bollocks" | 2022 | 9 | — | Non-album singles |
| "Haikei Rockstarsama 2022" (拝啓 ロックスター様2022) | 2022 | — | — | Non-album singles |
| "Hyper Cracker" | 2022 | 8 | 53 | Terminal Disease of ASP |
| "I Won't Let You Go" | 2022 | — | — | Terminal Disease of ASP |
| "No Color S" | 2023 | — | — | Terminal Disease of ASP |
| "I Hate U" | 2023 | 6 | — | Terminal Disease of ASP |
| "Heaven's Seven" | 2024 | 3 | 91 | Terminal Disease of ASP |
| "Black Nails" | 2024 | 7 | — | Terminal Disease of ASP |
| "Get New Mirai" (Get New ミライ) | 2025 | — | — | Non-album singles |
| "Ba-by" | 2025 | 9 | 59 | Non-album singles |
| "Pipe Dream" | 2026 | 6 | — | Non-album singles |
"—" denotes releases that did not chart or were not released in that region.

==== Collaborations ====
| Title | Year | Peak chart positions | Album |
| Title | Year | Oricon | Album |
|---|---|---|---|
| "Against the World" with Yuki Kashiwagi | 2021 | 16 | Non-album single |

== Concerts and tours ==
=== Tours ===
- ASP's on Fire Tour (2021)
- Tour Starfuckers (2021)
- March of Rogues Tour (2021)
- Redo Beginning Tour (2022)
- Sorry!! It's only for girls (2022)
- Acoustic Sad Orchestra Tour (2022)
- God Save the ASP Tour (2022)
- For girls and students from ASP (2023)
- Killing ASP Tour (2023)
- But I Love You Tour (2023)
- Actually Free but You must come Yaon Tour (2023)
- March with Rogues to Budokan (2024)
- ASP Complementation Plan B (2024)
- Acid Suspicious Parental Tour (2025)
- ASP in the UK Tour (2025)
- ASP CRUSH Tour 2025 (2025)
- This is ASP’s final tour (2026)

=== Concerts ===
- This is an ASP Oneman. (これはASPのワンマンです。) (2021)
- Anti Social Pains (2022)
- 24 Hours Anarchy Anarchy Shit Shit Party People (2022)
- WACK in the UK with ExWhyZ and AinatoAoi (2023)
- WACK in the UK Vol. 2 with Gang Parade and Kiss Kiss (2024)
- WACK in the UK Vol. 3 with Bis and Mameshiba no Taigun Tonai Bousho a.k.a. MonsterIdol (2024)
- WACK in the UK Vol. 4 with ExWhyZ and Mameshiba no Taigun Tonai Bousho a.k.a. MonsterIdol (2024)
- WACK in the UK Vol. 5 with Gang Parade and Kiss Kiss (2025)
- WACK in the UK Vol. 6 with ExWhyZ and Mameshiba no Taigun (2025)
