= Tonai Bousho =

Japanese idol girl group

- Origin: Japan
- Genre: J-pop
- Years active: 2022–2024
- Labels: WACK; Cutting Edge
- Spinoffs: Mameshiba no Taigun Tonai Bousho a.k.a. MonsterIdol
- Past members: Richi; Mina; Chihiro; Kino; Izuki; Miku
- Website: avex.jp/tonaibousho/

Tonai Bousho (Japanese: 都内某所; lit. 'Somewhere in Tokyo', stylized as TONAi BOUSHO) was a Japanese alternative idol girl group formed through the reality survival show Monster Love which featured on TBS Television's variety show Wednesday's Downtown in 2022. They debuted with the single, "Cookie", on December 15, 2022. They ceased activities as Tonai Bousho in January 2024 after merging with Mameshiba no Taigun to form Mameshiba no Taigun Tonai Bousho a.k.a. MonsterIdol.

== History ==
Tonai Bousho was formed on December 14, 2022, through the final of TBS's reality survival show Monster Love. The group's debut single, "Cookie", was released on December 15. On December 21, it was announced that Richi had decided to date Kuro-chan of Wednesday's Downtown and would therefore withdraw from the group on December 31. Auditions for new members were opened on the same day.

On February 15, 2023, Kino, Izuki and Chihiro joined the group. They released the digital single, "Have a Nice Day", on February 26. On April 3, Mina and Chihiro withdrew from the group. They released a second digital single, "Tonai Girl's", on May 1. On May 26, Miku went on hiatus due to a worsening chronic health condition. A third digital single, "Like or Love", was released on June 5, followed by a fourth digital single, "Cotton Candy Story", on July 23, and a fifth digital single, "Ice Cream no Hoshi", on August 17. Their first album, Where Are You Going?, was released on September 27. On October 1, Kino graduated from the group and Miku resumed activities. Izuki graduated from the group on December 2.

On January 6, 2024, Tonai Bousho and Mameshiba no Taigun merged to form Mameshiba no Taigun Tonai Bousho a.k.a. MonsterIdol.

== Members ==
=== Former ===
- Richi (リチ)
- Mina (ミナ)
- Chihiro (チヒロ)
- Kino (キノ)
- Izuki (イズキ), joined Hinatazaka46 in 2025
- Miku (ミク)

== Discography ==
=== Studio albums ===
Title	Album details	Peak chart positions	
Title	Album details	Oricon	Billboard
Where Are You Going?	Released: September 27, 2023; Label: Cutting Edge; Formats: CD, digital download	—	47

=== Singles ===
Title	Year	Peak chart positions	Album
Title	Year	Oricon	Album
"Cookie" (クッキー)	2022	25	Where Are You Going?
"Have a Nice Day" (ハバナイスデーイ)	2023	—	Where Are You Going?
"Tonai Girl's"	2023	—	Where Are You Going?
"Like or Love"	2023	—	Where Are You Going?
"Cotton Candy Story"	2023	—	Where Are You Going?
"Ice Cream no Hoshi" (アイスクリームの星)	2023	—	Where Are You Going?
"—" denotes releases that did not chart or were not released in that region.
