= Boysgroup =

Japanese idol boy band

- Also known as: WACK Boyz
- Origin: Japan
- Genres: J-pop
- Years active: 2022–2023
- Labels: WACK
- Past members: Ryosei; Rin; Shunji; Haru; Ayuru; Ryota

Boysgroup, stylized in all caps, was a Japanese alternative idol boy band formed by WACK in 2022. They debuted with the studio album, We are Boysgroup, on January 18, 2023. They disbanded on May 14, 2023.

== History ==
In 2021, WACK held the Project WACK-Chin Audition. The winner of the audition, Tasukukusu, would go on to take part in WACK's first all-male audition, the WACK Men's Joint Audition, in February 2022. During the audition camp it was announced that WACK intended to debut its first boy group. By the end of the audition camp Tasukukusu had been eliminated and three finalists – John Gokuh, Chin Bonbon, and Che Jiming, later known as Rin, Ryosei, and Shunji, respectively – were announced as members of the upcoming group. The group went by the tentative name, WACK Boyz. The Second WACK Men's Joint Audition was held in August 2022. At the end of the audition camp four of the participants: Ecchichichiichiichii, New, Yatto The Endo, and Hanagemonster, later known as Hinata, Haru, Ayuru, and Ryota, respectively, were chosen to also join the group. Hinata withdrew from the group in October 2022. On December 7, the group was given the name Boysgroup.

They released their debut album, We are Boysgroup, on January 18, 2023. Their first single, "Super Hero", was released on May 10.

They disbanded on May 14 after their final performance of the Boysgroup 1st Oneman Tour at Esaka Muse in Osaka.

== Former members ==
- Ryosei (リョウセイ)
- Rin (リン)
- Shunji (シュンジ)
- Haru (ハル)
- Ayuru (アユル)
- Ryota (リョウタ)

== Discography ==
=== Studio albums ===
Title	Album details	Peak chart positions	
Title	Album details	Oricon	Billboard
We are Boysgroup	Released: January 18, 2023; Label: WACK Records; Formats: CD, digital download	47	40

=== Singles ===
Title	Year	Peak chart positions	Album
Title	Year	Oricon	Album
"Super Hero" (スーパーヒーロー)	2023	13	Non-album single
"—" denotes releases that did not chart or were not released in that region.
