= Davlatmand Kholov =

Davlatmand Kholov Давлатманд Холов
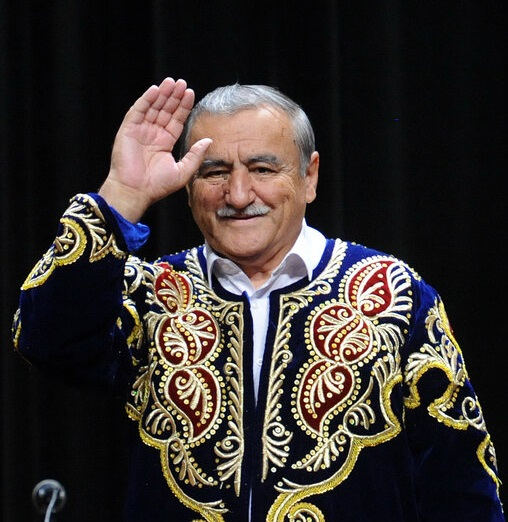
- Kholov in 2022

Background information
- Born: 26 October 1950
- Origin: Kulob, Khatlon Region, Tajik SSR, USSR
- Died: 18 February 2024 (aged 73) Dushanbe, Tajikistan
- Genres: Traditional Tajik music, Falak, Shashmaqam
- Occupation: singer
- Instruments: Rubob, tor

Davlatmand Kholov (Tajik: Давлатманд Холов; 26 October 1950 – 18 February 2024) was a Tajik musician and singer from Kulob. He was an expert in the southern folk genre of Tajik music called Falak (lit. "the firmament"). A multi-instrumentalist, trained in Shashmaqam at the Conservatory of Music in Dushanbe, he was well-known for his works on the two-string dutar, ghijak, and setar which are popular instruments in Central Asia.

Kholov played and sang poetry of the Sufi poets, mainly Jalaleddin Rumi; Davlatmand's outlook was close to Rumi's poetry and philosophy. He also belonged to the post-Soviet nationalist school of thought, or was influenced by "Tajikisation", therefore turning his back on Tajik shashmaqam. This can be displayed through his works: Sawt-i Falak or "The Voices of Falak", where he creates European symphonic settings to tell tales of Tajik life and rural practices. He released the album Learned & Folk Music on 9 January 1996.

Kholov died on 18 February 2024, at the age of 73 from cancer.
