= ExWhyZ =

Japanese music group

- Also known as: Empire
- Origin: Tokyo, Japan
- Genres: J-pop
- Years active: 2017–2026
- Labels: WACK; Avex Trax; EMI Records
- Past members: Yu-ki; Mayu; Maho; Mikina; Yuina Empire; Yuka Empire; Midoriko; Now
- Website: www.exwhyz.jp

ExWhyZ (stylized as ExWHYZ), formerly known as Empire (stylized as EMPiRE), was a Japanese alternative idol girl group formed between WACK and Avex Trax in 2017. They have released six studio albums, five EPs, and five singles since their formation. They re-branded to ExWhyZ in 2022 and re-debuted under EMI Records. The group disbanded in August 2026.

== History ==
=== 2017–2018: Formation, debut as Empire and The Empire Strikes Start!! ===
On April 2, 2017, WACK announced a joint project with Avex. On August 23, The group name was announced as Empire. By September 28, all members of the group had been revealed. The group's first song "Empire is Coming" was released on October 6, the song was later featured on WACK & Scrambles Works.

Empire's first album, The Empire Strikes Start!!, was released on April 11, 2018. The song "Black to the dreamlight" was featured on Black Clover as an ending theme. The group held their first concert named after their debut album on May 1. That same day the group's first member, Yuina Empire transferred to Bis and new members Maho Empire and Mikina Empire joined the group. The Empire Next Edition Tour was held from July to September of the same year. On September 5, Empire released their first EP, Empire Originals.

=== 2019–2020: The Great Journey Album ===
On February 27, 2019, Empire's first single, "Pierce", was released. The song "Pierce" was featured on the final season of Fairy Tail as an ending theme. From March 3 to 4 Empire broadcast the 24-hour live event "Empire Presents Twenty Four Hour Party People". After the event, Yuka Empire left Empire to focus on academic work. On March 30, Now Empire was added as the group's new member. Empire embarked on their second concert tour, which was called the New Empire Tour, from April to June. On July 17, Empire's second single, "Success Story", was released. On October 16, Empire's third single, "Right Now", was released. The song "Right Now" became Empire's second song to feature on Black Clover, this time as an opening theme. Empire embarked on their third concert tour, Empire's Great Escape Tour, from November to December. Empire's second album, The Great Journey Album, was released on December 18.

The group was scheduled to hold the Super Feeling Good Tour from May to June 2020, however it was cancelled due to the COVID-19 pandemic. They released their second EP, Super Cool EP, on August 5, 2020. They held the Empire Error Error Error Tour from November to December 2020.

=== 2021–2023: Bright Future, rebranding to ExWhyZ and XYZ ===
On March 17, 2021, Empire released a special single featuring new versions of "Don't tell me why" and "Tokyo Moonlight". Empire's fourth single, "Hon-no / Iza!!" was released on May 12. The song "Hon-no" was featured on High-Rise Invasion as an opening theme. They held the Empire Ultra Vibes Tour from April to May 2021. Empire's third album, Bright Future, was released on November 10. They held the Empire Dope Magic Tour from April to June 2022.

On June 2, 2022, the group held their final concert as Empire. It was announced at the concert that they would re-debut as members of ExWhyZ under EMI Records later that year. Through July and August, Empire held their final tour. On August 17, the group's final music release as Empire, a digital EP titled The Final Empire, was released.

On August 26, Midoriko went on hiatus due to a worsening chronic illness. ExWhyZ released their debut album, XYZ, through EMI Records on November 2. From November 2022 to January 2023 the group embarked on their first tour. Midoriko resumed group activities on January 12. XYZ was re-released on March 1, 2023, as XYZ [Hyper Edition], consisting of all of the original songs from the regular album but re-arranged to include vocals from Midoriko who was on hiatus at the time of the initial album recording and one new track.

=== 2023: Xanadu and How High? ===
In April, they embarked on their second tour. Their second album, Xanadu, was released on April 19. They released the digital single "Furachina Summer" on July 5. On July 13, Midoriko went on hiatus again. They digital single "Moonlight, Sunlight" was released on August 18, followed by "Not Sorry" on September 8. Their first EP as ExWhyZ titled How High? was released on October 18. They released the digital single, "As you wish", on October 19. On November 16, ExWhyZ performed at The Underworld in London alongside ASP and AinatoAoi (a duo consisting of Aina the End and dancer Aoi Yamada), as part of WACK's first multi-artist concert to be held outside of Japan.

=== 2024: Dress to Kill, Sweet & Sour and member departures ===
On January 12, 2024, they released a cover of Shinichi Osawa's "Our Song", followed by the digital single "Unknown Sense" on February 2. Both songs feature on their third studio album, Dress to Kill, which was released on March 20. On June 26, Mayu went on hiatus due to poor health. ExWhyZ's second EP, Sweet & Sour, was released on July 31. After being on hiatus since July 2023, Midoriko left ExWhyZ on August 7 due to the worsening of her chronic illness. Now left ExWhyZ on October 31. They performed in London for the second time alongside ASP and Mameshiba no Taigun Tonai Bousho a.k.a. MonsterIdol on November 27. Mayu returned from her hiatus on December 8.

=== 2025: iD, Don't Cry, and disbandment notice ===
On July 30, 2025, they released their first single as ExWhyZ, titled "ID". The next single, "Don't Cry", followed on December 10, 2025. On December 1, former WACK Representative Director Junnosuke Watanabe announced that he plans to start the "Second Chapter" of the company and disband ExWhyZ in 2026. The remaining members could participate in WACK's March 2026 audition camp or leave the company by 2027; however, none of them appeared in the camp.

=== 2026: Give You My Word, Zion, and ExWhyZ Last Live 'Hikari' ===
In March, the members had the opportunity to participate in WACK Joint Audition or leave the company by 2027; however, none of them appeared in the camp.

ExWhyZ held their only solo tour outside Japan, ExWhyZ in the UK Tour, from January 29 to February 2, 2026. Their third single, "Give You My Word" was released on April 1. On February 16, the group announced their final tour, which took place from May 6 to July 4.

ExWhyZ released the digital single "Tonight Tonight" on May 6. Three more digital singles, "Not Enough", "00:00", and "Faded", respectively followed on May 20, July 1, and August 5. They feature on their final album, "Zion", released on August 26.

ExWhyZ disbanded on August 31, with their final digital single "Hikari" being released on September 1.

== Members ==
=== Final line-up ===
- Yu-ki
- Mayu
- Maho
- Mikina

=== Former ===
- Yuina Empire
- Yuka Empire
- Midoriko
- Now

== Discography ==
=== Studio albums ===
Title	Album details	Peak chart positions	
Title	Album details	Oricon	Billboard
Empire
The Empire Strikes Start!!	Released: April 11, 2018; Label: Avex Trax; Formats: Cassette tape, digital download	7	4
The Great Journey Album	Released: December 18, 2019; Label: Avex Trax; Formats: CD, digital download	6	7
Bright Future	Released: November 10, 2021; Label: Avex Trax; Formats: CD, digital download	6	7
ExWhyZ
XYZ	Released: November 2, 2022; Label: EMI Records; Formats: CD, digital download	7	7
Xanadu	Released: April 19, 2023; Label: EMI Records; Formats: CD, digital download	8	7
Dress to Kill	Released: March 20, 2024; Label: EMI Records; Formats: CD, digital download	8	7
Zion	Released: August 26, 2026; Label: EMI Records; Formats: CD, digital download	9	36

=== Reissues ===
Title	Album details	Peak chart positions	
Title	Album details	Oricon	Billboard
ExWhyZ
XYZ (Hyper Edition)	Released: March 1, 2023; Label: EMI; Formats: CD, digital download	7	8

=== Extended plays ===
Title	Album details	Peak chart positions	
Title	Album details	Oricon	Billboard
Empire
Empire Originals	Released: September 5, 2018; Label: Avex Trax; Formats: CD, digital download	8	4
Super Cool EP	Released: August 5, 2020; Label: Avex Trax; Formats: CD, digital download	8	9
The Final Empire	Released: August 17, 2022; Label: Avex Trax; Formats: CD, digital download	—	—
ExWhyZ
How High?	Released: October 18, 2023; Label: EMI; Formats: CD, digital download	8	10
Sweet & Sour	Released: July 31, 2024; Label: EMI; Formats: CD, digital download	5	4

=== Singles ===
==== As lead artist ====
Title	Year	Peak chart positions		Album
Title	Year	Oricon	Billboard	Album
Empire
"Pierce" (ピアス)	2019	5	16	The Great Journey Album
"Selfish People"	2019	—	—	The Great Journey Album
"Success Story"	2019	5	15	The Great Journey Album
"Right Now"	2019	3	24	The Great Journey Album
"Ordinary"	2020	—	—	Super Cool EP
"Super Feeling Good"	2020	—	—	Super Cool EP
"Error"	2021	—	—	Bright Future
"Don't Tell Me Why (now type ver.)"	2021	88	—	Non-album singles
"Tokyo Moonlight (now type ver.)"	2021	88	—	Non-album singles
"Let's Show"	2021	—	—	Bright Future
"Hon-no"	2021	7	87	Bright Future
"Iza!!"	2021	7	—	Bright Future
"Nee" (ねぇ)	2022	—	—	The Final Empire
ExWhyZ
"Wanna Dance"	2022	—	—	XYZ
"Obsession"	2022	—	—	XYZ
"Answer"	2023	—	—	Xanadu
"Des Speeching"	2023	—	—	Xanadu
"First Step"	2023	—	—	Xanadu
"Furachina Summer" (フラチナサマー)	2023	—	—	How High?
"Moonlight, Sunlight"	2023	—	—	How High?
"Not Sorry"	2023	—	—	How High?
"As you wish"	2023	—	—	Dress to Kill
"Our Song"	2024	—	—	Dress to Kill
"Unknown Sense"	2024	—	—	Dress to Kill
"ID"	2025	5	39	Zion
"Don't Cry" / "Regret"	2025	7	42	Zion
"Give You My Word"	2026	4	42	Zion
"Tonight Tonight"	2026	—	—	Zion
"Not Enough"	2026	—	—	Zion
"00:00"	2026	—	—	Zion
"Faded"	2026	—	—	Zion
"Hikari"	2026	—	—	Zion
"—" denotes releases that did not chart or were not released in that region.

==== Collaborations ====
Title	Year	Peak chart positions	Album
Title	Year	Oricon	Album
Empire
"Jikan ga Tarinai" (時間が足りない) with Yuki Kashiwagi	2021	14	Non-album single

== Filmography ==
=== DVDs ===
Title	Album details	Peak chart positions
Title	Album details	Oricon
Empire
Empire's Great Revenge Live	Released: April 8, 2020; Label: Avex Trax; Formats: DVD	4
Empire Breaks Through the Limit Live	Released: April 7, 2021; Label: Avex Trax; Formats: DVD	5
Empire's Super Ultra Spectacular Show	Released: April 6, 2022; Label: Avex Trax; Formats: DVD	4
The Final Empire -Empire Dope Magic Tour 2022.06.02 at Line Cube Shibuya-	Released: August 17, 2022; Label: Avex Trax; Formats: DVD	3
ExWhyZ
ExWhyZ Tour 2024 Futura Free + 'Reinforce'	Released: December 25, 2024; Label: EMI Records; Formats: DVD	6

=== Blu-rays ===
Title	Album details	Peak chart positions
Title	Album details	Oricon
Empire
Empire's Great Revenge Live First Press Limited Edition (Great Edition)	Released: April 8, 2020; Label: Avex Trax; Formats: Blu-ray	10
Empire Breaks Through the Limit Live	Released: April 7, 2021; Label: Avex Trax; Formats: Blu-ray	7
Empire's Super Ultra Spectacular Show	Released: April 6, 2022; Label: Avex Trax; Formats: DVD	14
The Final Empire -Empire Dope Magic Tour 2022.06.02 at Line Cube Shibuya-	Released: August 17, 2022; Label: Avex Trax; Formats: DVD	5

== Concerts and tours ==
=== Tours ===
- Empire Next Edition Tour (2018)
- New Empire Tour (2019)
- Empire's Great Escape Tour (2019)
- Super Feeling Good Tour (2020; Cancelled)
- Empire Error Error Error Tour (2020)
- Empire Ultra Vibes Tour (2021)
- Empire Dope Magic Tour (2022)
- Moto-Empire Nari no Last Tour (元Empireなりのラストツア) (2022)
- ExWhyZ First Tour XYZ (2022–2023)
- ExWhyZ Tour 2023 Xanadu (2023)
- ExWhyZ Tour 2023 'Elation' Part.1: Live House Series (2023)
- ExWhyZ Tour 2023 'Elation' Part.2: with Special Guest Series (2023)
- ExWhyZ Tour 2023 'Elation' Part.3 Final Series: Yearend Party (2023)
- ExWhyZ presents 'SeihoWhyZ' (2024)
- ExWhyZ TOUR 2024 'HOPE' (2024)
- (unfinished) odds and ends (2025)
- Wide Open (2025)
- ExWhyZ in the UK Tour (2025)
- ExWhyZ Last Tour 'Dance Your Dance' (2026)

=== Concerts ===
- The Empire Strikes Start!! (2018)
- Empire Presents Twenty Four Hour Party People (2019)
- New Empire Tour "Evolutions" (2019)
- The End of Summer at Okinawa with Empire (2019)
- Empire's Great Party Vol. 0 (2019)
- Empire's Great Party Vol. 1 (2019)
- Empire's Great Revenge Live (2020)
- Empire Breaks Through The Limit Live (2020)
- Empire's Greatest Party "Eat Sleep Empire Repeat" (2021)
- Empire's Great Party Caravans (2021)
- Empire's Super Ultra Spectacular Show (2021)
- WACK in the UK with ASP and AinatoAoi (2023)
- WACK in the UK Vol. 4 with ASP and Mameshiba no Taigun Tonai Bousho a.k.a. MonsterIdol (2024)
- CLUB Ex Vol. 1 (2025)
- Our Step→Future’ (2025)
- ExWhyZ Special Live 'I' -3rd Anniversary Final & Year End Party (2025)
- ExWHYZ presents 'CLUB Ex FINAL' (2026)
- ExWhyZ LAST LIVE 'Hikari' (2026)
