= Anal Sex Penis =

Studio album by ASP
- Released: May 26, 2021
- Genre: J-pop
- Length: 46:16
- Language: Japanese
- Label: WACK

ASP chronology
Anal Sex Penis (2021)	Placebo (2022)

Anal Sex Penis is the debut studio album from Japanese girl group ASP. It was released on May 26, 2021, by WACK and consists of thirteen tracks.

== Track listing ==
All music composed by Kenta Matsukuma.

No.	Title	Lyrics	Length
1.	"Haikei Rockstarsama" (拝啓 ロックスター様)	JxSxK, Kenta Matsukuma	3:12
2.	"A Song of Punk"	JxSxK, Kenta Matsukuma	4:11
3.	"Be My Friend"	Yumeka Nowkana?, JxSxK, Kenta Matsukuma	2:06
4.	"Higaishaburuna" (被害者ぶるな)	Naayu	3:27
5.	"Wait and Waste"	JxSxK, Kenta Matsukuma	4:25
6.	"Now or Never"	Mog Ryan	3:53
7.	"Dive"	Naayu, JxSxK	3:25
8.	"Go Straight"	Mog Ryan	3:12
9.	"The Emperor's New Clothes"	JxSxK	4:30
10.	"Warries"	JxSxK	3:32
11.	"Trust Myself"	Mog Ryan, JxSxK, Kenta Matsukuma	3:06
12.	"Sakebe"	JxSxK, Kenta Matsukuma	3:54
13.	"Let It Go" (レリゴ)	JxSxK	3:28
Total length:			46:16

== Charts ==
Chart	Peak position
Japanese Albums (Oricon)	13
Japanese Albums (Billboard)	13
