= The International Playboys =

American modern rock band

The International Playboys were an American modern rock band formed in 2000. Since their inception, the group went through numerous lineups, including four ex-drummers. Its final roster included Monty Carlo (Colin Hickey), The Count (Chris Knudson), Cap'n Sextastic (Jake Morton), and Joe Danger (Joe Brennan).

The group was based out of Missoula, Montana and was a staple at the Northwest nightclub Jay's Upstairs during the early 2000s. Upon its closing, The International Playboys dedicated more time to their touring act, which crossed North America several times a year. The band played their final show before parting ways on August 2, 2007.

== Biography ==
The International Playboys released three studio albums. Their debut, First Album (2002), was given "props for their blend of unibrow Van Halen-meets-Candy Snatchers bad-boy rock" in a 2003 issue of Maximumrocknroll. SLUG Magazine called it "a skull-fracturing heap of primitive rock n’ roll comparable to James Brown on crack fronting a hyperactive band raised on Chuck Berry and The Ramones." The band's second album, Sexiful (2004), was described in a Punk Planet review as "irresponsibly entertaining music that once outraged parents." Cobra Blood Hangover, released in 2006, was compared by Allmusic's Stewart Mason to such bands as the Darkness, Jet, and Wolfmother. Mason remarked that three albums into the band's career, their "tongue-in-cheek celebration of '70s boogie raunch" had not yet gotten old. A review in Maximumrocknroll stated that the album's music has "lots of deep end, unexpected tempo changes, and a lyrical sense of the absurd."

In 2004, the band starred in the short musical film Ghouls Gone Wild!, which fictionally chronicled their grave misadventures while on tour. After taking a wrong turn, the band ended up stranded in a haunted ghost town, attacked by its ghoulish residents.

In 2006, The Playboys were named Pabst Blue Ribbon's Montana Band of the Year and were signed to Australian Cattle God Records.

== Touring and Beyond ==
- The band took part in several cross-country tours, playing alongside such groups as Japan's Guitar Wolf, Captured by Robots, NoMeansNo, Ghoultown, The Fireballs of Freedom, Volumen, and The Spiders. In August 2012 the band played an epic reunion show in Missoula during a citywide music festival.

== Discography ==
- First Album (2002)
- Sexiful (2004)
- Cobra Blood Hangover (2006)
