= Mameshiba no Taigun Tonai Bousho a.k.a. MonsterIdol =

Japanese idol group

- Origin: Tokyo, Japan
- Genres: J-pop
- Years active: 2024–2025
- Labels: WACK
- Spinoff of: Mameshiba no Taigun; Tonai Bousho
- Members: Nao of Nao; Aika the Spy; Leonaempire; Momoti Ngale
- Past members: Miku
- Website: monsteridol.jp

Mameshiba no Taigun Tonai Bousho a.k.a. MonsterIdol (豆柴の大群都内某所 a.k.a. MonsterIdol) was a Japanese alternative idol girl group formed in 2024 when Mameshiba no Taigun and Tonai Bousho merged into one group. They made their first recording in April 2024. They went on an indefinite hiatus in January 2025 after Mameshiba no Taigun resumed activities.

== History ==
On January 6, 2024, Mameshiba no Taigun and Tonai Bousho merged to form Mameshiba no Taigun Tonai Bousho a.k.a. MonsterIdol. In January, they embarked on the MonsterIdol Tour. Miku withdrew from the group on March 31 due to the worsening of her chronic illness. They released their debut single, "Wonderland", on April 3. On August 1, they released the digital singles "High Hopes" and "Ikasama Dance". The group performed at The Underworld in London alongside ASP and Bis on August 28. They performed in London for the second time alongside ASP and ExWhyZ on November 27. They released their first album, Toppa, on December 25. On January 8, 2025, the group went on an indefinite hiatus after the re-formation of Mameshiba no Taigun.

== Members ==
Current

- Nao of Nao (ナオ・オブ・ナオ)
- Aika the Spy (アイカ・ザ・スパイ)
- Leonaempire (レオナエンパイア)
- Momoti Ngale (モモチ・ンゲール)

Former

- Miku (ミク)

== Discography ==
=== Studio albums ===
Title	Album details	Peak chart positions	
Title	Album details	Oricon	Billboard
Toppa (突破)	Released: December 25, 2024; Label: Avex Trax; Formats: CD, digital download	16	—

=== Singles ===
Title	Year	Peak chart positions	Album
Title	Year	Oricon	Album
"Wonderland" (わんダーらんど)	2024	6	Non-album single
"High Hopes	2024	—	Toppa
"Ikasama Dance" (イカサマダンス)	2024	—	Toppa
"Break Out"	2024	—	Toppa
"—" denotes releases that did not chart or were not released in that region.
