= Dina Mariana =

Indonesian singer and actress (1965–2024)

Dina Mariana Heuvelman (21 August 1965 – 3 November 2024) was an Indonesian singer and actress.

== Life and career ==
Mariana was born on 21 August 1965 in Jakarta. She was famous as a child singer in the 1970s along with Adi Bing Slamet, Iyut Bing Slamet, and Chicha Koeswoyo. As a teenage singer, Dina had a hit with the song 'Ingat Kamu' which was released in the late 1980s.

== Personal life and death ==
Mariana was married to Radian Ratulangi Sugandi. They had three children: Ezra Mandira, Ewaldo Andipo, and Elyshia Nashira Ramandina. She died on 3 November 2024, at the age of 59.

== Discography ==
- "Pop Anak-anak" (1974)
- "Jual Kue" (1975)
- "Kisah Abunawas" (1976)
- "Pinokio" (1977)
- "Teman Sehati" (1977)
- "Mencari" (1977)
- "Pop Remaja Vol. 1" (1978)
- "Pop Remaja Vol. 2" (1978)
- "Pop Remaja Vol. 3" (1979)
- "Cubit" (1981)
- "Kau Bukan Milikku Lagi" (1981)
- 'Bunga Masih Bersemi" (1982)
- "Hati yang Kesepian" (1982)
- "Si Kura-kura" (1982)
- "Malu Dong Ah" (1983)
- "Idih... Idih... Kamu" (1983)
- "Ala... Mak" (1983)
- "Hati Lebur Jadi Debu" (1983)
- "Lelaki" (1984)
- "Jejaka" (1984)
- "Pop Bossa" (1984)
- "Surabaya" (1985)
- "Tante Cerewet" (1986)
- "Jejaka Aku Cinta Kamu!" (1986)
- "Pak Penghulu" (1987)
- "Komputer Cinta" (1987)
- "Gengsi Dong Aaa" (1987)
- "Ada-ada Saja" (1988)
- "Si Dia" (1988)
- "Ingat Kamu" (1988)
- "Akulah Isabella Kekasihmu" (1989)
- "Sekeranjang Cinta" (1990)
- "Boleh... Boleh... Boleh..." (1994)
- "12 Kumpulan Lagu Anak Indonesia" (2007)
- "Nuansa Cinta" (2008)

== Filmography ==
- Demi Cinta (1974)
- Rahasia Gadis (1975)
- Ridho Allah (1977)
- Ayah Tiriku Ibu Tirimu (1977)
- Senyum Nona Ana (1977)
- Si Boneka Kayu, Pinokio (1979)
- Ira Maya Si Anak Tiri (1979)
- Ira Maya dan Kakek Ateng (1979)
- Nakalnya Anak-Anak (1980)
- Di Sini Cinta Pertama Kali Bersemi (1980)
- Merenda Hari Esok (1981)
- Bukan Impian Semusim (1981)
- Tangan-Tangan Mungil (1981)
- Saat-Saat Kau Berbaring di Dadaku (1984)
- Persaingna Remaja (1984)
- Biarkan Kami Bercinta (1984)
- Duel (1984)
- Gairah Pertama (1984)
- Bisikan Setan (1985)
- Yang Masih di Bawah Umur (1985)
- Opera Jakarta (1985)
