= First Album (Kiss Kiss album) =

Studio album by Kiss Kiss
- Released: June 21, 2023
- Genre: J-pop
- Length: 39:56
- Language: Japanese
- Label: WACK Records

First Album is the debut studio album from Japanese girl group Kiss Kiss. It was released on June 21, 2023, by WACK Records and consists of twelve tracks.

== Track listing ==
First Album track listing
No.	Title	Lyrics	Music	Length
1.	"Kisses"	瀬楠触恋怒	Shigeyuki Harada	3:54
2.	"Uten Kekkō" (雨天決行)	Shigeyuki Harada	Shigeyuki Harada	3:13
3.	"Wanwanoo Love♡" (わんわんおーらぶ♡)	Kila May	Togo	3:22
4.	"Kiss Kiss Sunset"	Aina the End	Aina the End	3:00
5.	"Frankenstein" (フランケンシュタイン)	Potential	Togo	2:55
6.	"Kiss Kiss Kiss"	Kissma-chan	Kissma-chan, Yohji Igarashi	3:56
7.	"Marshmallow Body" (マシュマロボディ)	Shigeyuki Harada	Shigeyuki Harada	2:45
8.	"Inai Inai Baa" (いないいないばー)	Shigeyuki Harada	Shigeyuki Harada	2:40
9.	"Seek"	Ca Non	Togo	3:00
10.	"Twilight"	Emi Okamoto	Emi Okamoto, Yohji Igarashi	3:09
11.	"Ano Hi no Melody" (あの日のメロディ)	Changbaby, Shigeyuki Harada	Shigeyuki Harada	4:33
12.	"Ideal"	Naruhaworld	Togo	3:22
Total length:				39:56

== Charts ==
Chart performance for First Album
Chart	Peak position
Japanese Albums (Oricon)	4
Japanese Hot Albums (Billboard Japan)	3
