= XYZ (ExWhyZ album) =

Studio album by ExWhyZ
- Released: November 2, 2022
- Genre: J-pop
- Length: 38:33
- Language: Japanese
- Label: WACK; EMI Records

ExWhyZ chronology
The Final Empire (2022)	XYZ (2022)	Xanadu (2023)

XYZ is the debut studio album from Japanese idol group ExWhyZ. It was released on November 2, 2022, by EMI Records. The album was preceded by two singles, "Wanna Dance" and "Obsession". The album consists of eleven tracks. The album was re-released as XYZ (Hyper Edition) on March 1, 2023, including vocals from Midoriko and one additional track.

== Track listing ==
XYZ track listing
No.	Title	Lyrics	Music	Length
1.	"XYZ"			1:34
2.	"D.Y.D"	ExWhyZ, Miru Shinoda, Kento Yamada	Miru Shinoda, Kento Yamada	3:46
3.	"Stay with Me"	Mickie J	Denny White	3:01
4.	"Obsession"	Kanata Okajima	80Kidz, Maika Loubte	3:18
5.	"4:00 a.m"	Mikina, Maho	Michael Kaneko	3:07
6.	"Weekend"	Maho, Manpan Ito	Marcus Maria, Wennegaard Maria, Jake K, Kim Jake Byung Jin	3:45
7.	"Wanna Dance"	ExWhyZ, Shinichi Osawa	Shinichi Osawa	4:22
8.	"Aishiteru" (あいしてる)	Maho	Shingo Sekiguchi	4:35
9.	"You & Me"	Maho	Satoru Kurihara, Tasuku Maeda	3:38
10.	"Higher"	Mayu, Shin Sakiura	Shin Sakiura	3:13
11.	"Universe"	Maho, Miru Shinoda, Kento Yamada	Miru Shinoda, Kento Yamada	4:09
Total length:				38:33

XYZ (Hyper Edition) bonus tracks
No.	Title	Lyrics	Music	Length
1.	"Secret Secret"	Satoru Kurihara, Mayu, Midoriko, Yu-ki, Maho	Satoru Kurihara, Tasuku Maeda	3:29
Total length:				42:01

== Charts ==
Chart performance for XYZ
Chart	Peak position	
Chart	XYZ	XYZ (Hyper Edition)
Japanese Albums (Oricon)	7	7
Japanese Hot Albums (Billboard)	7	8
