= Mameshiba no Taigun =

Japanese idol group

- Origin: Tokyo, Japan
- Genres: J-pop
- Years active: 2019–2024; 2025–present
- Labels: WACK; Tower Records; Avex Trax
- Spinoffs: Mameshiba no Taigun Tonai Bousho a.k.a. MonsterIdol
- Members: Hanaemonster; Nao of Nao; Aika the Spy; Leonaempire; Momoti Ngale
- Past members: Kaedephoenix; Miyukiangel
- Website: mameshiba-no-taigun.jp

Mameshiba no Taigun (豆柴の大群), stylized as MAMESHiBA NO TAiGUN, is a Japanese alternative idol girl group formed through the reality survival show Monster Idol which featured on TBS Television's variety show Wednesday's Downtown in 2019. They debuted on December 19, 2019, with "Restart". They ceased activities as Mameshiba no Taigun in January 2024 after merging with Tonai Bousho to form Mameshiba no Taigun Tonai Bousho a.k.a. MonsterIdol. In January 2025, Mameshiba no Taigun resumed activities.

== History ==
=== 2019–2020: Formation and debut ===
Mameshiba no Taigun was formed on December 18, 2019, through the final of TBS's reality survival show Monster Idol. While Hanae, Nao, Aika and Miyuki were contestants on the show, Hanae was also a member of WACK's trainee group Wagg. They released their debut single, "Restart", on December 19. A fifth member, Kaede, who was also a contestant on the show, was added to the group's line-up on December 25.

On January 1, 2020, the members' stage names were revealed. The group's second single, "Rocket Start", and third single, "Daijōbu Sunrise", were released together on March 4.

The group were scheduled to release their debut studio album, Start, on May 13, 2020, however it was delayed to June 10 due to the COVID-19 pandemic. Running up to the release of the album the group released "Flash" and "Donkusa Happy" as digital singles. On August 5, it was announced that the group would make their major debut with the triple A side single, "AAA", under Avex Trax on October 7. On December 30, They became one of four recipients of the New Artist Award at the 62nd Japan Record Awards.

=== 2021–2022: Must Change Project and audition camp ===
The group released their second studio album, Mamejor!, on January 20, 2021. They released their first EP, Wow!! Season, on July 14. Their second major single, "Kinō wa Modoranai / Koi no Full Swing", was released on December 22.

They released their third major single, "Mamen Joy / Machigai Darake no Hero", on July 20, 2022. On September 7, in the lead up to the release of their next single, "Must Change", the group launched the "Must Change Project" in which each member would have a solo edition of the CD single and whoever sold the most copies would receive a solo debut while whoever sold the least number of copies would have to re-audition for the group. On December 7, they released their fourth major single, "Must Change". On December 10, the winner of the "Must Change Project" was revealed to be Nao while the loser was revealed to be Aika, therefore Nao would get to debut as a soloist while Aika would have to take part in an audition camp.

From December 11 to 14, Mameshiba no Taigun Nari no Gasshuku (豆柴の大群なりの合宿), an audition camp with the aim of finding new members for the group was held. Initially, Aika was the only member who would take part in the camp due to her losing the "Must Change Project", but it was decided that all existing members of the group, excluding Kaede, would take part in the camp with their position in the line-up at risk. It was announced that the audition camp was being held due to the unprofessionalism of the group's members who had cancelled an upcoming job with little notice thus causing staff problems. The audition camp resulted in Nao and Aika being kicked out of the group but they were ultimately allowed to keep their positions. Kaede graduated from the group on December 17 at the We Must Change Tour Final where new members, Reona and Momoka, later known as Leonaempire and Momoti Ngale, who were recruited through the audition camp joined the group. Both new members made their debut performance with the group on January 6, 2023. A re-recorded version of "Must Change", titled "Must Change -We Keep Changing-", without Kaede and featuring the new members was released on the same day.

=== 2023–2025: MonsterIdol and re-formation ===
They released their third studio album, Mamequest, on February 22, 2023. On July 29, they released the digital single "Mamethunder". They released their fifth major single, "PRiPRi / Sing Along Time!", on October 4. Hanaemonster and Miyukiangel graduated from the group on December 25.

On January 6, 2024, Mameshiba no Taigun and Tonai Bousho merged to form Mameshiba no Taigun Tonai Bousho a.k.a. MonsterIdol.

On January 8, 2025, Mameshiba no Taigun re-formed with the final line-up of Mameshiba no Taigun Tonai Bousho a.k.a. MonsterIdol returning as members and the re-addition of former member Hanaemonster. Their first digital single since re-formation titled "Reload" was released the next day. On June 4, they released the triple A side single, "Mame3" (豆3), consisting of the songs: "Reload", "Retry", and "Mysterious Party".

On November 12, Mameshiba no Taigun released their best-of album, No Bean, No Bark.

On December 1, former WACK Representative Director Junnosuke Watanabe announced that he would cease managing Mameshiba no Taigun in 2026.

=== 2026–Present: Hadaka no Mermaid ===
The group released their eighth single, "Hadaka no Mermaid", on July 8. It featured on Grand Blue Dreaming as an ending theme. That same day, WACK revealed that Mameshiba no Taigun will continue be active under the agency.

== Members ==
=== Current ===
- Hanaemonster (ハナエモンスター)
- Nao of Nao (ナオ・オブ・ナオ)
- Aika the Spy (アイカ・ザ・スパイ)
- Leonaempire (レオナエンパイア)
- Momoti Ngale (モモチ・ンゲール)

=== Former ===
- Kaedephoenix (カエデフェニックス)
- Miyukiangel (ミユキエンジェル)

== Discography ==
=== Studio albums ===
Title	Album details	Peak chart positions	
Title	Album details	Oricon	Billboard
Start (スタート)	Released: June 10, 2020 (Pre-released on June 3, 2020); Label: Tower Records; Formats: CD, digital download	10	10
Mamejor! (まめジャー!)	Released: January 20, 2021; Label: Avex Trax; Formats: CD, digital download	11	13
Mamequest	Released: February 22, 2023; Label: Avex Trax; Formats: CD, digital download	7	12

=== Compilation albums ===
Title	Album details	Peak positions	
Title	Album details	JPN Oricon	JPN Billboard
No Bean, No Bark	Released: November 12, 2025; Label: Avex Trax; Formats: CD, digital download	11	—

=== Extended plays ===
Title	Album details	Peak chart positions	
Title	Album details	Oricon	Billboard
Wow!! Season (Wow!! シーズン)	Released: July 14, 2021; Label: Avex Trax; Formats: CD, digital download	8	13

=== Singles ===
==== As lead artist ====
Title	Year	Peak chart positions		Album
Title	Year	Oricon	Billboard	Album
"Restart" (りスタート)	2019	1	3	Start
"Rocket Start" (ろけっとすたーと)	2020	22	—	Start
"Daijōbu Sunrise" (大丈夫サンライズ)	2020	23	—	Start
"Samabari" (サマバリ) (Note: "Samabari", "Koi no Kakezan ABCDEFG", and "Ima" are part of a triple A side single titled "AAA".)	2020	4	—	Mamejor!
"Koi no Kakezan ABCDEFG" (恋のかけ算 ABCDEFG)	2020	4	—	Mamejor!
"Ima" (今)	2020	4	—	Mamejor!
"Love Chikyu" (らぶ地球) with First Summer Uika	2021	—	—	Non-album singles
"Kinō wa Modoranai" (昨日は戻らない)	2021	6	—	Non-album singles
"Koi no Full Swing" (恋のフルスイング)	2021	6	—	Non-album singles
"Oshogatsu" (お正月)	2021	—	—	Non-album singles
"Sakura Iro" (桜色)	2022	—	—	Mamequest
"Mamen Joy" (豆んJoy)	2022	3	71	Non-album singles
"Machigai Darake no Hero" (間違いだらけのヒーロー)	2022	3	—	Non-album singles
"Must Change"	2022	3	51	Non-album singles
"Must Change -We Keep Changing-"	2023	—	—	Mamequest
"Mamethunder" (豆サンダー)	2023	—	—	Non-album singles
"PRiPRi" (ぷりぷり) (Note: "PRiPRi" and "Sing Along Time!" are part of a double A side single titled "PRiPRi / Sing Along Time!".)	2023	5	—	Non-album singles
"Sing Along Time!"	2023	5	—	Non-album singles
"Reload" (りロード) (Note: "Reload", "Retry", and "Mysterious Party" are part of a triple A side single titled "Mame3" (豆3).)	2025	6	—	Non-album singles
"Retry" (リトライ)	2025	6	—	Non-album singles
"Mysterious Party" (ミステリアスパーティー)	2025	6	—	Non-album singles
"Hadaka no Mermaid" (裸のマーメード)	2026	—	—	Non-album singles
"—" denotes releases that did not chart or were not released in that region.

==== Collaborations ====
Title	Year	Peak chart positions	Album
Title	Year	Oricon	Album
"Zutto ki ni Naru Zucchini" (ずっと気になるズッキーニ) with Yuki Kashiwagi	2021	11	Non-album single

== Awards and nominations ==
Award ceremony	Year	Category	Nominee(s)/work(s)	Result	Ref.
Japan Record Awards	2020	Best New Artist	Mameshiba no Taigun	Won	
