= WACK (music company) =

Japanese talent agency and record label

- Native name: 株式会社WACK
- Romanized name: Kabushikigaisha WACK
- Type: Private
- Industry: Entertainment
- Founded: August 3, 2014; 12 years ago
- Founder: Junnosuke Watanabe
- Headquarters: Dōgenzaka, Shibuya, Tokyo, Japan
- Website: www.wack.jp

WACK (Watanabe Artistic Creative Corporation (わたなべ あーてぃすちっく くりえいてぃぶ かぶしきがいしゃ, Watanabe Atisuchikku Kurieitibu Kabushikigaisha)) is a Japanese talent agency and record label specialising in alternative idols. The company was founded by Junnosuke Watanabe in 2014, following the first disbandment of Bis and the formation of Pla2me.

== History ==
=== 2014–2015: Establishment and formation of Bish ===
WACK was established by Junnosuke Watanabe on August 3, 2014, after the dissolution of the first generation of Bis and the formation of Pla2me. This is not a business was the first artist to sign the company, followed by Pla2me.

On January 14, 2015, the formation of Bish was announced. They released their debut studio album, Brand-New Idol Shit, on May 27.

On June 1, Pla2me changed their name to POP and four new members, Miki Yamamachi, Yua Yumeno, Ao Shigusawa and Maaya Inukai, joined the group.

This is not a business disbanded on December 1.

=== 2016: Gang Parade and second generation of Bis ===
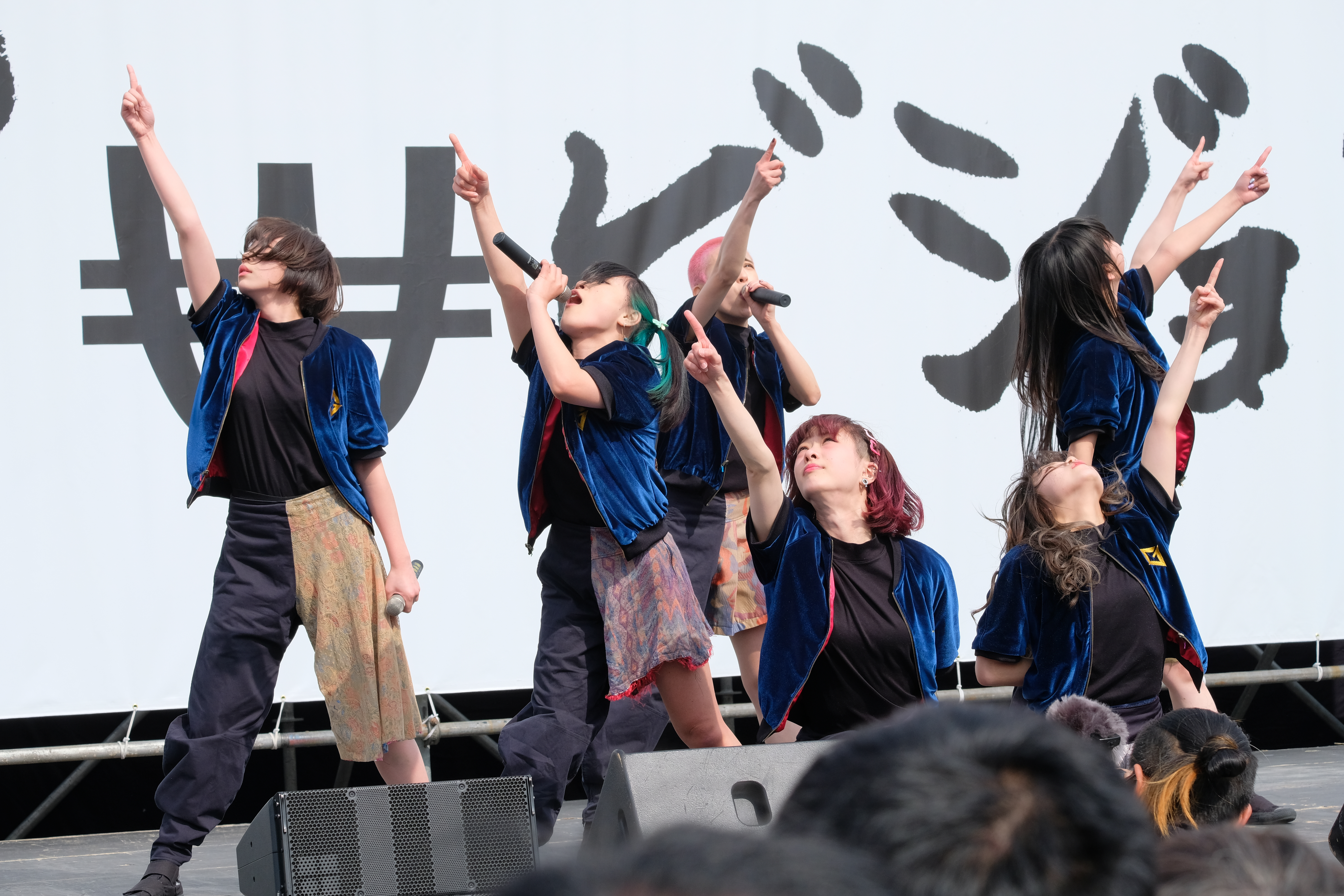
Gang Parade during the WACK Exhibition 2017.

From May 14 to 15, POP performed at Idolidge in Taiwan, making them the first WACK group to perform outside of Japan. On June 17, 2016, POP changed their name to Gang Parade. In October, Can Maika and three former Sis members, Coco Partin Coco, Yuka Terashima and Yui Ga Dockson, joined the group.

On July 8, the relaunch of Bis was announced with the return of original member Pour Lui. An audition camp was held from August to September in determine the members of Bis' second generation. Alongside Pour Lui, the line-up consisted of Aya Eightprince, Go Zeela, Kika Front Frontale, and Peri Ubu. It was also announced that the finalists who had not been chosen to join Bis would debut in a sister group called Sis. At Bis' second generation's debut performance, Sis took to the stage and declared themselves to be Bis' rivals. However, Sis was ultimately short-lived as they disbanded on September 26, one day after their debut performance. The second generation of Bis released their debut studio album, Brand-new idol Society 2, on November 16.

=== 2017: Formation of Empire ===
On April 2, 2017, WACK held its first annual audition camp, WACK Audition Camp 2017 concluded with four successful participants joining WACK. Hirano Nozomu and Ooshouji Megumi, later known as Momoland and Pan Luna Leafy joined Bis, while Gamiya Saki and Momoko Gumi Inc., later known as Yuka Empire and Yu-ki Empire, joined the line-up for a collaborative group between WACK and Avex with the temporary name Project AW. It was also announced that Aya Eightprince of Bis and Kamiya Saki of Gang Parade would temporarily swap groups for six months from May 1 in what was coined a "rental trade".

On August 6, the "rental trade" was extended indefinitely.

On August 23, the line-up for Project AW was finalised and group's official name, Empire, was revealed. They released their first song, "Empire Is Coming", on October 6.

On October 2, WACK's first shuffle unit, Saint Sex, was formed. They released their first single, "WACK is Fxxk", on October 18.

On December 6 WACK released its first shuffle album, WACK & Scrambles Works, in which artists under the company covered different songs such as Bis' "Nerve" and "Gives", Bish's "Orchestra", and Gang Parade's "Plastic 2 Mercy".

=== 2018: Empire's debut and Pedro ===
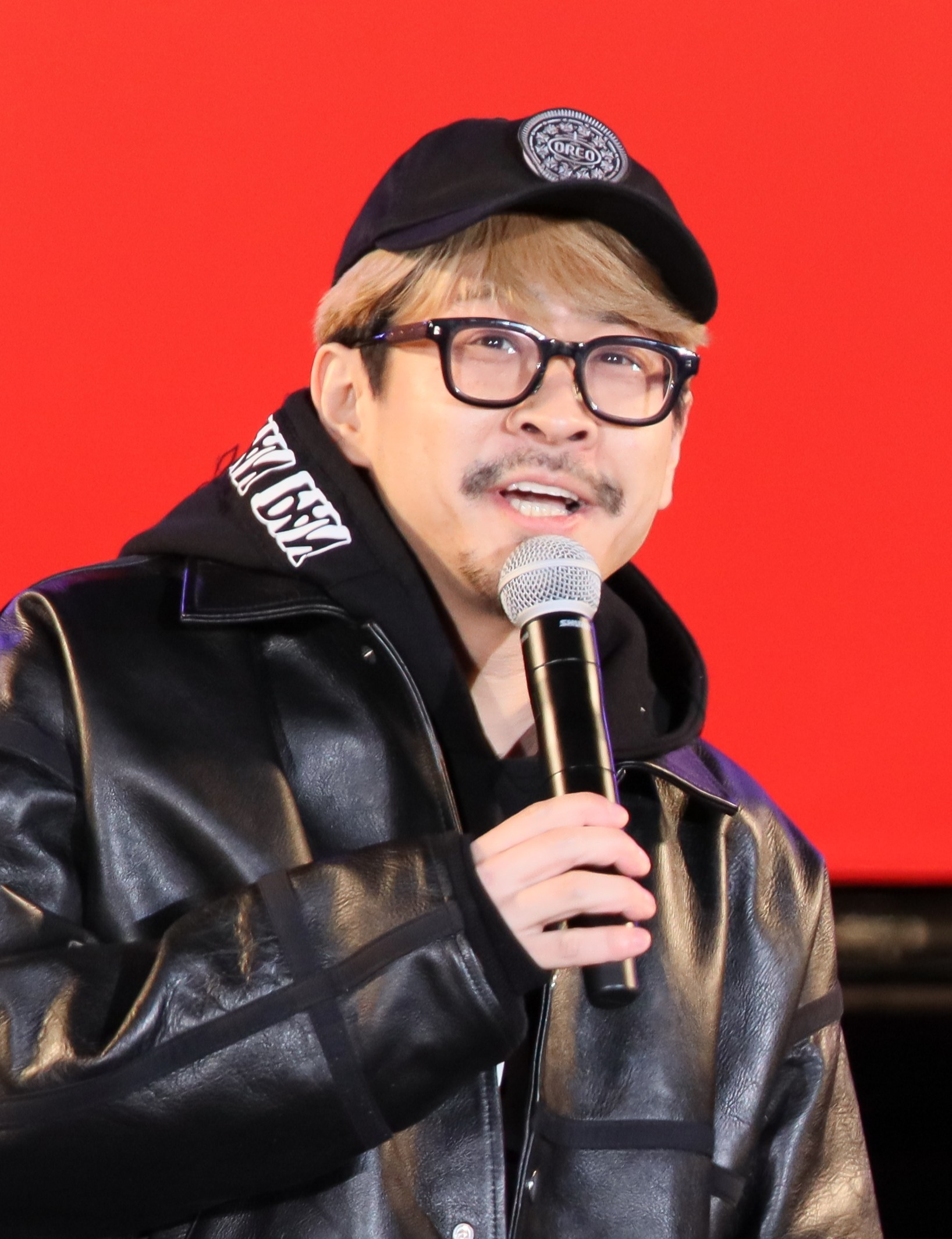
Junnosuke Watanabe (2018), founder of WACK.

On March 4, 2018, the "rental trade" came to an end.

On March 18, WACK Audition Camp 2018 concluded with nine successful participants joining WACK. Gamiya Saki, Cent Chihiro Tette, Orangeko Vampire, Ayuna C, and Choushouji Megumi, later known as Yuuki, Toriaez Hana, Nel Nehru, Muropanako, and Mewclub, joined Bis, Yokoyama Hina and Lisoliso, later known as Tsukino Usagi and Haruna Bad Chiiiin, joined Gang Parade, while Michihayashi Rio and Yaya Eightprince, later known as Mikina Empire and Maho Empire, joined Empire. It was announced that Bis would split into two units, Bis 1st and Bis 2nd. Bis 1st would consist of Go Zeela, Pan Luna Leafy, Momoland, Yuuki, Toriaez Hana, and Nel Nehru, Bis 2nd would consist of Kika Front Frontale, Aya Eightprince, Peri Ubu, Muropanako, and Mewclub. It was also announced that Yuina Empire would be permanently transferred to Bis 2nd.

Empire released their debut studio album, The Empire Strikes Start!!, on April 11.

In April, following the split of Bis into two units, a rotating line-up system called Bis.League was launched. Due to the withdrawals of Momoland and Yuuki, Bis 1st would have fewer members then Bis 2nd, therefore it was decided that fans would vote for their favourite members and the members with the most votes would join Bis 1st while the members with the fewest votes would join Bis 2nd. It was intended that a vote would be held for every music release so that the line-up of each other would constantly change.

On May 28, WACK launched its trainee unit, Wagg.

On July 26, WACK's second shuffle unit, Holy Shits, released their first single "WACK is Shit".

On September 19, Bish's Ayuni D debuted in the band Pedro with the EP Zoozoosea.

Bis.League was abolished on December 29.

=== 2019: Bis' third generation, Carry Loose and Mameshiba no Taigun ===
On March 30, 2019, WACK Audition Camp 2019 concluded with two successful participants joining WACK and one Wagg member being promoted to a group. Terayama Yufu later known as Now Empire joined Empire, Cent Chihiro no Imouto later known as Naayu joined Wagg, and Wagg member Naruha joined Gang Parade. It was also announced that Pedro had signed with EMI Records and that the second generation of Bis would disband on May 11, with the intention of auditions for a third generation to be held.

The second generation of Bis disbanded on May 11 with a concert at Akasaka Blitz.

On April 10, WACK's third shuffle unit, Bully Idol, a parody of Billie Idle, released their version of "Soshite, Mata...".

The line-up for the third generation of Bis was revealed on June 11.

On June 19, a new idol group was announced under the temporary name Curry Rouxz, the group would consist of former Bis members Pan Luna Leafy and Yuina Empire, and Wagg trainee Uruu Ru. Auditions for a fourth member were held and eventually Yumeka Naukana? was added to the line-up, which would be named Carry Loose. They released their eponymous debut album on October 22.

The third generation of Bis debuted on August 14, with the album Brand-new idol Society, sharing its name with the first generation of Bis' debut album.

From November to December, WACK documented the audition process of forming a new group through the survival reality show, Monster Idol, which aired on TBS' Wednesday's Downtown. The group's name, Mameshiba no Taigun, debut single "Restart", and final four member line-up was finalised on December 18. Although a fifth member was added on December 25.

=== 2020: Gang Parade split and Carry Loose's disbandment ===
On March 28, 2020, WACK Audition Camp 2020 concluded one successful participant joining WACK and one Wagg member being promoted to a group. Waki Waki Wakki later known as Youdot.com joined Wagg and Kila May joined Gang Parade. However it was announced that Gang Parade would split into two groups: Go to the Beds and Paradises. They released the debut split EP, G/P, consisting of three songs per group and Kamiya Saki's final solo song before graduating from Gang Parade and WACK on April 1, 2020, after being an artist under the company since 2015.

On June 1, WACK opened global auditions for a new group.

On October 10, WACK began a livestreamed audition event in which WACK trainees, Wagg, would compete to join Paradises, the livestream was titled Paradises no Subarashiki Mirai (Paradisesの素晴らしき未来).

On October 31, Carry Loose disbanded after an attempt to achieve a major label debut through a 24-hour a day livestream lasting almost three months had failed. Shortly after, Pan Luna Leafy and Uruu Ru left WACK.

On December 26, the winner of Paradises no Subarashiki Mirai (Paradisesの素晴らしき未来), Utauuta, joined Paradises. Usagi Tsukino, a current member of Paradises at the time was moved to Wagg for six months alongside former Carry Loose member Yuina Empire.

=== 2021: Formation of ASP and temporary addition of AKB48's Yuki Kashiwagi ===
On February 3, 2021, Bish's Aina the End debuted as a solo artist with the studio album, The End.

On March 27, WACK Audition Camp 2021 concluded with Cola, later known as Ca Non joining Paradises, Moshimoshichan, later known as Changbaby, joining Go to the Beds, and Teratairuku Yuka, later known as Bell Nard, joining Wagg. The formation of a new group named ASP was also announced. ASP's member were later revealed to be former Carry Loose member Yumeka Nowkana?, Naayu who was a member of WACK's trainee group Wagg, and two new members who had been pre-selected before the audition camp. ASP released their debut album, Anal Sex Penis, on May 26.

On April 9, it was announced that AKB48 member Yuki Kashiwagi would temporarily join all seven current WACK groups as a member, with the stage name Yuki Reysole. On August 31, all seven WACK groups were set to release a single each, all of which would feature Kashiwagi. The release of the singles was later delayed following Kashiwagi's diagnosis of Syringomyelia.

On June 16, Dōgenzaka43 (道玄坂43), a parody of the Sakamichi Series of idol groups and a one-off shuffle unit consisting of every idol that was part of WACK at the time, released the single "Kyōniku Jakushoku ~Tsuyoi Yatsura wo Kucchimae~" (強肉弱食時代 〜強い奴らを食っちまえ〜).

On October 2, Watanabe announced that all members of Go to the Beds and Paradises would immediately swap groups and release a second split EP on December 15.

On October 8, it was announced that a new shuffle unit would be formed of seven WACK members based on votes from fans through a competition named Vote! WACK Select 7, the group are to be produced by Yuki Kashiwagi and the line-up was finalised on December 27.

On November 3, Ayuni D debuted as a solo artist under the name Aomushi (青虫).

On November 30, all seven WACK groups released a single each featuring Yuki Kashiwagi.

The results of Vote! WACK Select 7 which were released on December 27, revealed that the line-up of the new shuffle unit would be Yui Ga Dockson, Tsukino Usagi, Terashima Yuka, Hashiyasume Atsuko, Yamamachi Miki, Yumeno Yua and Cent Chihiro Chittiii. A second shuffle unit formed of three members who ranked low in the competition was also formed of Lingling, Yu-ki Empire and Nameless.

=== 2022: Gang Parade resumes activities, Empire's disbandment, ExWhyZ and Tonai Bousho ===
On January 2, 2022, Gang Parade, who previously split into Go to the Beds and Paradises, resumed activities with the addition of Kila May, Changbaby and Ca Non as new members.

In an audition camp held from February 24 to 27, WACK's first all-male idol group was formed, they would later be known as WACK Boyz.

On March 23, the Vote! WACK Select 7 winning group was named Spy, while the losing group was named Innocent Ass. Spy's debut single, "Anata wo Nerai Uchi♡" (あなたを狙い撃ち♡), which features two B-sides: a cover of AKB48's "Ōgoe Diamond" by Spy and Innocents Ass' debut song, "Everyone is Good and Bad", was released on June 1.

On March 26, WACK Audition Camp 2022 concluded with Gang Parade gaining two new members, Ainastar (a former Wagg trainee) and Tantan, later known as Potential, who joined the group on May 13. ASP also gained two new members, Ayuna C, later known as CCCCCC (a former member of HKT48) and Kanaedemon, later known as Riontown, who made their debut with the group on May 7.

From August 18 to 21, WACK held its second all-male audition camp in order to finalise the line-up of WACK Boyz.

Empire disbanded on June 2. At their final concert Watanabe announced that all of the members of Empire would re-debut as ExWhyZ under EMI Records later that year. ExWhyZ released their debut studio album on November 2.

WACK's trainee unit Wagg disbanded on October 18. All of the members of Wagg left WACK in November.

From December 11 to 14, WACK held an audition camp, Mameshiba no Taigun Nari no Gasshuku (豆柴の大群なりの合宿), with the aim of finding new members for Mameshiba no Taigun. All existing members of the group, excluding Kaede who would be graduating on December 17, took part in the camp with their position in the line-up at risk. On December 17, audition camp contestants Momoka and Reona joined the group and Kaede graduated.

On December 15, Tonai Bousho, a girl group formed through Monster Love on Wednesday's Downtown debuted with the single "Cookie".

=== 2023: Boysgroup, Kiss Kiss, Bite a Shock and disbandment of Bish ===
WACK Boyz debuted under the name Boysgroup with the album, We Are Boysgroup, on January 18, 2023.

On 8 February, Bish announced that they had established Bish Co., Ltd. as a subsidiary of WACK and that they would launch audition project Bish The Next, with the purpose of producing their successor group.

On March 25, WACK Audition Camp 2023 concluded with three successful participants: Changadult, Aika The Police, and Hitorikko, later known as Shion Epic, Iko Mugennokanata, and Kurenai World's End, joining WACK as members of Bis. It was also announced at the conclusion of the audition camp that Kiss Kiss, a new group consisting of six members of Gang Parade had been formed.

Boysgroup disbanded on May 14.

On June 21, Kiss Kiss released their debut album.

Bish disbanded on June 29.

Bish's successor group, Bite a Shock, that was formed through Bish The Next debuted on July 9.

On August 23, former Bish member Cent Chihiro Chittiii released her debut album, Per→cent→age.

On November 16, WACK held their first multi-artist concert outside of Japan. The event took place at The Underworld in London and the line-up consisted of ExWhyZ, ASP and AinatoAoi (a duo consisting of Aina the End and dancer Aoi Yamada).

=== 2024: MonsterIdol and WACK in the UK ===
On January 5, 2024, former Bish member Cent Chihiro Chittiii left the company.

On January 6, Mameshiba no Taigun and Tonai Bousho merged to form Mameshiba no Taigun Tonai Bousho a.k.a. MonsterIdol.

On February 6, Kudaranai 1 Nichi joined WACK.

Gang Parade, ASP, and Kiss Kiss performed at The Underworld in London on March 27.

On April 1, Bis' members began to self-manage the group.

On August 1, Junnosuke Watanabe, the founder and director of WACK resigned his position at the company, citing an interest in studying in the UK.

On August 9, Bis announced that they would disband. Their disbandment date was later revealed to be January 12, 2025.

ASP, Bis, and Mameshiba no Taigun Tonai Bousho a.k.a. MonsterIdol performed at The Underworld in London on August 28.

ASP, ExWhyZ, and Mameshiba no Taigun Tonai Bousho a.k.a. MonsterIdol performed at The Underworld in London on November 27.

=== 2025: Return of Mameshiba no Taigun and disbandment announcements ===
In January, WACK announced Junnosuke Watanabe as an honorary advisor of an alternative idol news site named DiG YOUR OWN IDOLS.

On January 8, 2025, Mameshiba no Taigun re-formed with the final line-up of Mameshiba no Taigun Tonai Bousho a.k.a. MonsterIdol returning as members and the re-addition of former member Hanaemonster. The third generation of Bis disbanded on January 12, 2025, after their final concert at Hibiya Open-Air Concert Hall.

Gang Parade, ASP, and Kiss Kiss performed at The Underworld in London on March 26 for the fifth edition of WACK in the UK.

On April 1, former Bish member Aina the End left the company.

On June 5 and 6, WACK in the UK Vol. 6 took place at The Underworld in London. The line-up for June 5 consisted of ExWhyZ, ASP, and Mameshiba no Taigun, and the line-up for June 6 consisted of Mapa, Piggs, and ZOCX.

On December 1, Watanabe announced that he would end WACK's "First Chapter" (第1章) by disbanding Gang Parade, ASP, ExWhyZ, Kiss Kiss, and Bite a Shock in 2026.

On December 21, Bite a Shock revealed that their disbandment would be on March 8, 2026. ASP announced their disbandment on December 31.

=== 2026: Preparations for WACK's Second Chapter ===
On January 1, Gang Parade announced that they would disband on October 29.

Bite a Shock disbanded on March 8.

From March 22 to 28, WACK held an audition camp, its first since 2023. Idols under WACK were to participate or leave the company by 2027. Unlike the previous camps, WACK welcomed former members to compete. Nameless was the only WACK idol compete and eliminated on March 22. Unlike prior camps, WACK rejected all participants on the final day.

ASP disbanded on May 4.

ExWhyZ disbanded on August 31.

Kiss Kiss will disband on November 30.

== Artists ==
=== Groups ===
- Mameshiba no Taigun
- Kiss Kiss

=== Bands ===
- Kudaranai 1 Nichi

== Former artists ==
=== Groups ===
- Sis
- Carry Loose
- Go to the Beds
- Paradises
- Wagg
- Boysgroup
- Bish
- Tonai Bousho
- Mameshiba no Taigun Tonai Bousho a.k.a. MonsterIdol
- Bis
- Bite a Shock
- ASP
- ExWhyZ (formerly Empire)
- Gang Parade

=== Bands ===
- This is not a business
- Beat Mints Boyz
- Pedro

=== Soloists ===
- Aina the End
- Ayuni D
- Cent

== Discography ==
=== Studio albums ===
Title	Album details	Peak chart positions	
Title	Album details	JAP	JAP Hot Albums
WACK & Scrambles Works	Released: December 6, 2017; Label: Avex Trax; Formats: CD, digital download	15	4

== Concerts and tours ==
=== Tours ===
- Going Going WACK Tour (2019)
- WACK Fuckin' Party (2020)
- To Be Continued WACK Tour (2021)
- WACK WACK Shit Tour (2022)
- Fuck Watanabe Tour (2023)
- We will WACK you!! Tour (2023)
- Pizza WACKful World Tour (2024)
- Could you still be WACKiNG TOUR (2025)
- GAZE a part of WACK TOUR (2025)
- Where the End Begins by WACK (2026)

=== Concerts ===
- WACK in the UK (2023)
- WACK in the UK Vol. 2 (2024)
- WACK in the UK Vol. 3 (2024)
- WACK in the UK Vol. 4 (2024)
- WACK in the UK Vol. 5 (2025)
- WACK in the UK Vol. 6 (2025)
