= 2020 in Japanese music =

The year 2020 in Japanese music.

== Debuting ==
=== Debuting groups ===
- All at Once
- Arcana Project
- Beatcats
- BIN
- Chō Tokimeki Sendenbu
- EXIT
- Go to the Beds
- Inuwasi
- JO1
- Morfonica
- Nature
- NCT Dream
- Nemophila
- NiziU
- Orbit
- Paradises
- Piggs
- Sakurazaka46
- SixTones
- Snow Man
- Stray Kids
- Tomorrow X Together
- Zamb

=== Debuting soloists ===
- Ado
- Ai Furihata
- Fujii Kaze
- Hikaru
- Yurina Hirate
- Hoshimachi Suisei
- Gakuto Kajiwara
- Ryota Katayose
- Keiko
- Takuya Kimura
- Haruka Kudō
- Akane Kumada
- Tomori Kusunoki
- Liyuu
- Karin Miyamoto
- Nana Mori
- Win Morisaki
- Yuki Nakashima
- Yui Ninomiya
- Koutaro Nishiyama
- Sae Ōtsuka
- Miki Satō
- Riho Sayashi
- Nanaka Suwa
- Aina Suzuki
- Azumi Waki
- Reina Washio
- Jun. K

== Returning from hiatus ==
- 12012
- Does
- Chris Hart
- Hirakawachi Itchōme
- Iz*One
- Lindberg
- Pour Lui
- Marble
- Nightmare
- Seikima-II
- Tokyo Jihen
- Under17

== Events ==
- 71st NHK Kōhaku Uta Gassen

== Number-ones ==
- Oricon number-one albums
- Oricon number-one singles
- Hot 100 number-one singles

== Awards ==
- 62nd Japan Record Awards
- 2020 MTV Video Music Awards Japan

== Albums released ==
=== January ===
Date	Album	Artist	Ref.
1	The Age of Dragon Knights	JAM Project	
1	20200101	Shingo Katori	
1	Adam	The Brow Beat	
8	Gekidan Ogyarhythm	Chiaki Mayumura	
8	El-Rodar	Climbgrow	
8	Who Are You?	Hiroomi Tosaka	
8	P.o.P -PERS of Persons-	Jun Fukuyama	
8	Contralto	Miyuki Nakajima	
8	Eternally	Oh My Girl	
8	Shin Seiki	Polkadot Stingray	
8	Child's Medical Record	Shinsei Kamattechan	
8	Go with the Flow	Takuya Kimura	
8	Diver	Toshiki Masuda	
8	Five Leaves	Uncle Bomb	
14	Yubikiri ~Kono Saki mo Issho ni Ayunde Ikou ne~	Heroines	
15	Hoshi kai no shōnen	Akihide	
15	Voice/Manifesto	Argonavis, Gyroaxia	
15	Soda Pop Fanclub 3	Cidergirl	
15	Toy Box II -All Night Mix-	DJ To-i	
15	Sukisugiteyabai ~Kokuhakujikkouiinkai Character Song Shu~	HoneyWorks	
15	Venomer	Kairiki Bear	
15	Kamiyado Complete Best 2018–2019	Kamiyado	
15	Ceremony	King Gnu	
15	Shitsuren sukurappu	Koresawa	
15	XXX	Luna Kaguya	
15	All Year Round	Rina Katahira	
15	Zone of Gold	Ryuji Imaichi	
15	0	Superfly	
15	Inside Your Head	Survive Said The Prophet	
15	Strawberry Next!	Sutopuri	
15	Magic Hour	TXT	
22	Ring A Ring	Aina Suzuki	
22	Borderless	Ame No Parade	
22	C3	Base Ball Bear	
22	Tokyo	Cy8er	
22	Sayonara made no 30-bu	Echoll, Rayons	
22	22	Jun	
22	Mangekyō Etaniti	LatuLatu	
22	1LDK	Lefty Hand Cream	
22	Mada Ikemasu	Mao Abe	
22	Misia Soul Jazz Best 2020	Misia	
22	Natural Story	Natural Lag	
22	The Dream	NCT Dream	
22	Iratsuku toki wa itsu datte	Orange Spini Club	
22	Kinjitou	Reol	
22	Perfect Seamo	Seamo	
22	Neo Propaganda	Sumire Uesaka	
22	Pink Elephant	Toshinori Yonekura	
22	Milestone	Totalfat	
22	White White	XIIX	
22	Prototype	Xmas Eileen	
24	Alive	Growth	
25	Buster Bros!!! -Before The 2nd D.R.B-	Buster Bros!!!	
25	We Do	Ikimono-gakari	
28	Anti-Teeze (Deluxe Edition)	Blacksheep Syndrome	
29	Ain't Seen Nothing Yet	Egg Brain	
29	Utopia da yori	Gakuen-sai Gakuen	
29	Klue	Gezan	
29	My Princess II	Houkago Princess	
29	Nimaime	Kari Band	
29	202020	Kazuyoshi Saito	
29	Harinezumizumu	Kyuso Nekokami	
29	Electric Pentagram	Lovebites	
29	Mad Trigger Crew -Before The 2nd D.R.B-	Mad Trigger Crew	
29	Watashino Nakano Watashi	Madoka Moriyasu	
29	Saigo no matsunojō	Matsunojō Kanda	
29	Makkuro	Tricot	
29	Zoo!!	Necry Talkie	
29	Shishamo 6	Shishamo	
29	Relics	Soft Ballet	
29	CharadeManiacs Character Song & Drama Vol.3	Soma Saito, Daisuke Namikawa, Makoto Furukawa	
29	I Think U	Super Junior	
29	Rikkoku Sengen	TOC	
29	Tripper!!	UMake	

=== February ===
Date	Album	Artist	Ref.
4	Note5	Yamakatsu	
5	Lookie	Bis	
5	+	Kazuyoshi Nakamura	
5	Start The Magic Hour	Lapis Re:Lights	
5	Just A Boy	Longman	
5	Hiromenesu / Kimi no Rhapsody	Mashumairesh!!	
5	Sanctuary II ～Minori Chihara Best Album～	Minori Chihara	
5	Nipponno Onnawo Uatu Best2	NakamuraEmi	
5	Bedtime Story	Regal Lily	
5	Passion	Sakurako Ohara	
5	Pop X Step!?	Sexy Zone	
5	Stereo Dive	Stereo Dive Foundation	
5	Iminante Nai	T-Ace	
5	Kiteretumental World	Tokyo Gegegay	
5	&Twice - Repackage	Twice	
12	Treasure EP: Map To Answer	Ateez	
12	Smile	Eve	
12	Fantastic 9	Fantastics from Exile Tribe	
12	Assortrip	Halca	
12	Keep Going	Hitomi Yaida	
12	I	Kana Adachi	
12	Bright New World	Little Glee Monster	
12	Minnade!	Manami Numakura	
12	Yumeyū	Niiisan's	
12	Kiss from the Darkness	Scandal	
12	Official Hige Dandism One-Man Tour 2019@Nippon Budokan	Official Hige Dandism	
12	Seiko Oomori	Seiko Oomori	
12	Pret-a-porter	Shuta Sueyoshi	
12	Touchable	Tatsuya Ishii	
12	Winner The Best "Song 4 U"	Winner	
12	Zutto ChamJam	ChamJam	
14	Echo	Chara+Yuki	
18	Admiration	Blacknazarene	
19	AAA 15th Anniversary All Time Best -thanx AAA lot-	AAA	
19	Ange☆Reve	Ange☆Reve	
19	Useless Machine	Humbreaders	
19	Hello Stranger	Learners	
19	Magical Supermarket	Magical Punchline	
19	Prover/Tell me	Milet	
19	Moratorium	Omoinotake	
19	BL	Queen Bee	
19	TV Asahi Saturday Night Drama "Ossanzu Love -in the sky-" Original Soundtrack	Shin Kono	
19	This is music too	Trio Ohashi	
19	Butchigiri Again	Yokohama Ginbae	
20	Requiem And Silence	Chihiro Onitsuka	
21	Oikaze Fortissimo	Pure Coffee Latte	
22	Exile The Second The Best	Exile The Second	
26	Mandala A	Dauto	
26	Circle	Dish	
26	Fling Posse -Before The 2nd D.R.B-	Fling Posse	
26	Smile Rush	HelloYouth	
26	Feel The Y's City	Jung Yong-hwa	
26	Journey to U	Kaname and Haruki	
26	Shin uchū + Wrap Drive	Kirameki Unforent	
26	Northview	Monkey Majik	
26	Modal Soul	Nujabes	
26	Libre	OnePixcel	
26	Avant-title	Sae Otsuka	
26	Stardust☆Revue Live Tour 'Kanreki shōnen'	Stardust☆Revue	
26	Otoko no hanamichi~Sungje's Japanese Songbook	Sungje from Supernova	
26	The Kebabs	The Kebabs	
26	'Kono Oto tomare!' ~Bokutachi no oto ~	Tokise Koto Gakko Sokyoku-bu	
26	Magic Moment	Wakana	
28	Arashi Reborn Vol.1	Arashi	

=== March ===
Date	Album	Artist	Ref.
3	Sakura Gakuin 2019 ~Story~	Sakura Gakuin	
4	The Roots Evolved	Country Yard	
4	#Waitaisuka~tsu	Enth X Spark!!Sound!!Show!!	
4	Miyamoto, Doppo.	Hiroji Miyamoto	
4	Zig Zag	Kaela Kimura	
4	Teen Teen Teen	Kalma	
4	Kana-Boon The Best	Kana-Boon	
4	Yuanfen	Kano	
4	From Dropout	Kiro Akiyama	
4	Daimeiwaku	Mei-chan	
4	Mizu	Mizu	
4	Museum-The Best of Myth & Roid-	Myth & Roid	
4	Story	NEWS	
4	Aratamemashite, Sakurashimeji To Moushimasu	Sakura Shimeji	
4	Best Yours II 2010–2020 Double Decade	Takui Nakajima	
4	Celebration	TFG	
4	My Loving	Tokinosora	
4	Devil	Vickeblanka	
4	Wake Up, Girls! Live Album ~Omoide no Parade~	Wake Up, Girls!	
4	Touch The World	Yu Sakai	
4	A Day	Yuri Komagata	
4	Yuzutown	Yuzu	
4	Ever After	XOX	
4	Brakura	Za Ninngenn	
5	Complete EPLP ~All Time Single Collection~	RC Succession	
11	Aio Piano Arioso	Ai Otsuka	
11	Boycott	Amazarashi	
11	Idō shudan wa baikudesu / kaban ni wa teppandesu	Dokonjofinger	
11	Gold Dash	Gacharic Spin	
11	Review II ~Best of Glay~	Glay	
11	Re(mix)	Koda Kumi	
11	Bloom	Kurokumo	
11	Juvenilizm Seishun Shugi	M!lk	
11	Reality in Black -Japanese Edition-	Mamamoo	
11	Kōkyōkyoku Girls & Pants	Shiro Hamaguchi	
11	Tokyo Heart Beats	Spicy Chocolate	
11	To You	Unione	
11	Yugenjikko	Yusuke	
13	The Best of 2PM in Japan 2011–2016	2PM	
13	Shall we☆Carnival	Iris	
18	Evoke 2010–2020	Aldious	
18	Matousic	Anna Takeuchi	
18	DJ Daichizen Presents Daichi Miura Non Stop DJ Mix Vol.2	Daichi Miura	
18	W Trouble	Johnny's West	
18	Best Selection Album of Victor Years Complete Box	Keytalk	
18	-0(Zero)-	Kodai Yoshida	
18	Le☆S☆Ca	Le☆S☆Ca	
18	Singularity	Lead	
18	Lightning	lol	
18	Ultima	Lynch	
18	Necessary	Maiko Fujita	
18	Be My One	Mitsuhiro Oikawa	
18	Love Live! Nijigasaki Academy ~Lunch Break Broadcast Room~ Drama CD Daily Concerto	Nijigasaki High School Idol Club	
18	Smash The Paint!!	Nijisanji	
18	Blue Bird	Park Bo-gum	
18	Re:I	Rachel Rhodes	
18	Neo Gravity	Re:Complex	
18	Empathy	Reina Ueda	
18	You Are Rottengraffty	Rottengraffty	
18	Raise The Flag	Sandaime J Soul Brothers	
18	Satoru Kōsaki 20th Anniversary Selected Works "Dawn"	Satoru Kōsaki	
18	Pop Step Jump!	Spira Spica	
18	SKZ2020	Stray Kids	
18	Gift from Fanks M	TM Network	
18	Gift from Fanks T	TM Network	
18	Tokyo Ska Treasures ~Best of Tokyo Ska Paradise Orchestra~	Tokyo Ska Paradise Orchestra	
18	Orion Blue	Uru	
18	No.9	Vistlip	
20	Breath Of Bless	Aska	
20	HanaDoll* 1st season～Flowering～ Vol.4 "Message"	HanaDoll*	
20	Tohoku Inbound	Iginari Tohoku San	
21	Happy Ending	Eiichi Ohtaki	
25	Possible	826aska	
25	King of Caste ~Bird in the Cage~	B-Project	
25	Burnout Syndromez	Burnout Syndromes	
25	Chiharu Matsuyama Collectiob "Omoide"	Chiharu Matsuyama	
25	Target	Flower Flower	
25	KDHR	Haruka Kudō	
25	The Brightness In Rebirth	Hawaiian6	
25	Sparkle	Iri	
25	Ink	Keita	
25	To-y2	Kis-My-Ft2	
25	Japanese Menu/Distortion 10	Kiyoharu	
25	Complete Singles 2000–2019	Love Psychedelico	
25	Matenro -Before The 2nd D.R.B-	Matenro	
25	Slayers Mgeumixxx	Megumi Hara	
25	Juusshoku Theorem	Plastic Tree	
25	Sister Cities	Saori Hayami	
25	CIY	Sirup	
25	Musical "Tōken ranbu" Higekiri Hizamaru Sō-ki Shutsujin 2019	Swordsman Gigekiri Hizamaru	
25	Assemble	Takuma Terashima	
25	Kiseki Best Collection II	Wagakki Band	
25	Wasuta Best	Wasuta	
25	The Tree of Forty Fruits	Wolpis Carter	
25	Cryoni"X"	X4	
25	The Age of Villains	Yōsei Teikoku	
30	Dolls Songs & Sounds 01	Dolls	
31	Curtain Raise	Rikako Aida	

=== April ===
Date	Album	Artist	Ref.
1	Kick The Best	ARP	
1	F	Funky Kato	
1	G/P	Go to the Beds & Paradises from Gang Parade	
1	Hope	Macaroni Enpitsu	
1	Man With A "B-Sides & Covers" Mission	Man with a Mission	
1	Yell and Response	Mashumairesh!!	
1	Seiko Matsuda 40th Anniversary Bible～blooming pink～	Seiko Matsuda	
1	Frontier	Share Lock Homes	
1	Present	Valshe	
1	Cāo	Yasuyuki Okamura	
8	L.O.V.E.	Ace Collection	
8	Manga Mitaina Koibito Ga Hoshii	Akari Nanawo	
8	Sweet Cruisin'	Anly	
8	Aiha Headphone Kara	Chiai Fujikawa	
8	Dreamy-logue	Dialogue+	
8	Positive	F-Blood	
8	Best Of Vocal Works[NZK]2	Hiroyuki Sawano	
8	Your Story	Juju	
8	Jugem	Lie and a Chameleon	
8	Ichijiku	Meimi Tamura	
8	Agapanthus	Momo Asakura	
8	Shin Schadara Dai Sakusen	Scha Dara Parr	
8	Triptych	Shohei Takagi Parallela Botanica	
8	Yukusaki, debasaki	Tebasaki Sensation	
8	Anemone EP	The Peggies	
8	News	Tokyo Jihen	
8	Yoshida Yamada Ōhyakka	Yoshida Yamada	
15	Sign	Aina Aiba	
15	The Park	Akai Ko-en	
15	Ai ga chikyū sukuu n sa! Datte Denpagumi.inc wa famirīdesho	Dempagumi.inc	
15	Invitations	Drama Store	
15	Ai no Hana	HimeHina	
15	Kingdom	Hiroki Nanami	
15	Maximum Huavo	Inaba/Salas	
15	Dusk	Kashicomi	
15	All Time Rock 'n' Roll	Masayuki Suzuki	
15	10's Best	Okamoto's	
15	On'o	One N' Only	
15	Run Riot	Outrage	
15	ID10+	Ryôhei Shima	
15	Trust and Play	Tetsuya Kakihara, Nobuhiko Okamoto	
15	Sainou	Toru Kitajima	
15	WYXT.	Who-ya Extended	
15	Double Standard	Yuji Nakada	
21	First Star	Jewel Ciel	
21	Kotoko's Game Song Complete Box "The Bible"	Kotoko	
22	Rockin' It Jazz Orchestra Live In Osaka- Cornerstones 7	Chikuzen Sato	
22	1LDK	Gadoro	
22	D4DJ 1st Album 「Direct Drive!」	Happy Around!	
22	TP	Hiroshi Kamiya	
22	Our Best	Jin Akanishi	
22	OK!!!!!	Lyrical School	
22	M.S.S.Period	M.S.S Project	
22	Chronos	Matenrou Opera	
22	Holy Nights	Miyavi	
22	Premiere Fleurs	Petit Fleurs	
22	Harezora	Sonoko Inoue	
22	Technodon (Remastered 2020)	YMO	
24	SQ 「Cards」 Series Volume 2 Solids 「Daiamond」	Solids	
28	BenjaminJasmine	BenjaminJasmine	
29	Everynight	Age Factory	
29	Fuyajou Eden	Alice Nine	
29	Face	Da-ice	
29	Ome de taitō de nani yori 2	Happy Heads Naniyori	
29	Worst -Complete Box-	Kohh	
29	Covers2 Grace of The Guitar+	Megumi Mori	
29	Nayutan hoshi kara no buttai N	Nayutalien	
29	Impulsive Humans Club	Pedro	
29	Suchmos The Live Yokohama Stadium 2019.09.08	Suchmos	
29	Japanese Heavy Metal	Tetsuya Kanmuri	
29	Suck My World	The Oral Cigarettes	
29	Arrival of Voyz Boy	Voyz Boy	
29	Boku-ra 100-pāsento shinderu	Zombie	

=== May ===
Date	Album	Artist	Ref.
13	Yūon Club ~2nd Grade~	Ayaka	
13	Field of View 25th Anniversary Extra Rare Best 2020	Field of View	
13	Utai tsugu! Nihon no hayariuta	Hiroshi Miyama	
13	Rainbow Planet	Kiyotaka Sugiyama	
13	Answer	Leo Ieiri	
13	Man With A "Remix" Mission	Man with a Mission	
13	So Sweet Dolce	Nanaka Suwa	
13	Monsters	Natsu to Suisei	
13	Synesthesia	Rain Drops	
13	Wave	Special Others	
13	Stella Magna -Songs from Granblue Fantasy-	Stella Magna	
13	The Power of Redemption	Takenori Shimoyama	
13	Rock'n'Roll to the Max	The Slut Banks	
13	Earplay ~Rebirth 2~	Toshiki Kadomatsu	
13	Burst Pop Island	Wienners	
13	Good Vibrations 2	Yasuyuki Horigome	
20	Species	Crossfaith	
20	Real	Flumpool	
20	10th Anniversary All Time Best / Yellow [2010–2020]	F.T. Island	
20	Help Ever Hurt Never	Fujii Kaze	
20	Chuwapane!	Girls^{2}	
20	Sonzai Riyū ～Raison d'etre～	Masashi Sada	
20	Run Girls, World!	Run Girls, Run!	
20	Shōnan no Kaze ~Shihousenpuu~	Shōnan no Kaze	
20	Inside Outside	Track's	
20	Jitan Classic	Tsukemen	
20	Thousands of Rays	Wyse	
20	Kenzen Na Shakai	Yonige	
22	Iine!	Sunny Day Service	
22	Lost, Never Gone	Yaffle	
27	Rei	Adam At	
27	Panku shūri	Anarchy	
27	Charametal Box	Funassyi	
27	Genex	Genic	
27	Chō mitchaku! Tori tsukare CD 'yūgen romantica saikōchō' dai ichi no nazo karasu tengu Hifumi	Kenn	
27	Wonderland	Novelbright	
27	Thaw	Quruli	
27	Piofiōre no banshō character CD Vol. 4 Nikora furanchesuka	Ryōhei Kimura	
27	All Time Best Album	Saico	
27	Strobo	Vaundy	
29	'Vazzrock' bi – karā series 2nd season 12 'Ōguro Gaku – hematite×amethyst -'	Takuya Masumoto	

=== June ===
Date	Album	Artist	Ref.
3	Hari no Ana	Ai Kawashima	
3	Seek	Depapepe	
3	Goro Noguchi Debut 50th Anniversary ～Since1971～	Goro Noguchi	
3	Start	Mameshiba no Taigun	
3	Eyes	Milet	
3	Complete Single Collection CD Box	Off Course	
3	Me	Sayuri	
3	Ageku No Hate	SymaG	
9	Papillon -Bohemian Rhapsody-	Kiyoshi Hikawa	
9	6.9	Masochistic Ono Band	
10	Style	Akari Kitō	
10	Hang On The Faith	Dradnats	
10	Connect	FlowBack	
10	Addicted Box	Kazuki Kato	
10	Start	Mameshiba no Taigun	
10	Aku	Mucc	
10	See-Saw Complete Best -See-Saw-Scene-	See-Saw	
10	Aoaosorasidream	Sky Peace	
10	AI Factory	T-Square	
10	Yuki Kajiura Live Vol.#15 ～Soundtrack Special at the Amphitheater～	Yuki Kajiura	
17	Love Fades	Endrecheri	
17	Streaming, CD, Record	Gesu no Kiwami Otome	
17	Rainbow Gravity	Niji no Conquistador	
17	Call Up My Comrades	SA	
17	Thank God, There Are Hundreds Of Ways To Kill Enemies	SiM	
24	Rosa	Chihiro Yamanaka	
24	Major of Cubers	Cubers	
24	D4DJ 2nd Album "Cosmic Coastar"	Happy Around!	
24	Compiled EPLP ~All Time Single Collection~	Kiyoshiro Imawano	
24	Chō mitchaku! Tori tsukare CD 'yūgen romantica saikōchō' dai 弐 No nazo merī-san meryi	Kōsuke Toriumi	
24	Kyousouka	Kotone	
24	Fiction	Maison Book Girl	
24	Mirage Best ~Complete Mirage^{2} Songs~	Mirage^{2}	
24	Ongeki Vocal Party 01	Ongekishūtāzu	
24	Round 12	Paris Match	
24	Breakthrough!	Poppin'Party	
24	Sukima Switch Tour 2019–2020 Popman's Carnival Vol.2	Sukima Switch	
24	35-Nen de 35-kyoku "natsu to koi"~ natsu no kazu dake koi shitakedo ~	Tube	
24	35-Nen de 35-kyoku "namida to ase"~ namida wa kokoro no asedakara ~	Tube	
24	Candy Tuft	Yukari Tamura	
26	HanaDoll 1st season～Flowering～ 5-Kan "For"	HanaDoll	
26	TV anime "Bungō to Alchemist" gekiban-on rakushū	Hideki Sakamoto	
30	Make You Happy	NiziU	

=== July ===
Date	Album	Artist	Ref.
1	Me o tojireba	Fomare	
1	Harami Teishoku ~Streetpiano Collection~	Harami-chan	
1	Harvest	Misato Watanabe	
1	Diggin Ice 2020 Performed By Muro	Muro	
1	H.U.E.	Noisemaker	
1	Hallo Piggs	Piggs	
1	Thank God It's Runny's Day	Runny Noize	
1	Tragicomedy	She's	
1	Trash	The Stalin	
1	Sphere ~Kyū uchū~	Yuki Koyanagi	
2	2020	Tha Blue Herb	
7	Strobe Edge	KRD8	
8	It's All Me, Vol. 1	Ai	
8	Nomake Story	Asako	
8	Grow Apart	Awesome City Club	
8	A-rin Assort	Ayaka Sasaki	
8	×・×・×	Batten Japari-Dan	
8	For Live -Bish Best-	Bish	
8	The Band Star	Harukamirai	
8	Symbol	Miyakawa-kun	
8	5	Mrs. Green Apple	
8	Awake	She'll Sleep	
8	Vista	Toconoma	
8	Nihon No Natsu Kara Konnichiwa	Tube	
14	Falsetto	Ryutist	
15	POP	B.O.L.T	
15	Map of the Soul: 7 - The Journey	BTS	
15	N.Hoolywood Compile In New York Collection	Daiki Tsuneta	
15	Vintage	G-Freak Factor	
15	Nuance	Ivudot	
15	Man with a "Best" Mission	Man with a Mission	
15	Miho Morikawa Very Best Songs 35	Miho Morikawa	
15	Shimney	Nilfruits	
15	Single collection + Achikochi	Maaya Sakamoto	
15	Wahl	Roselia	
21	Hotdog	Dog In The Parallelworld Orchestra	
22	Letters	Bish	
22	Theory of evolution	Earphones	
22	Go to the Beds	Go to the Beds	
22	Five of a Kind-Live in Tokyo 2020	Lovebites	
22	Paradises	Paradises	
22	Chō mitchaku! Tori tsukare CD 'yūgen romanchika saikōchō' dai san no nazo baku utashiro	Ryōhei Kimura	
22	Nenjujū Mosaku	Stardust Revue	
22	Eyes	Wonk	
28	Trajectory	Harajuku Dreammate	
29	Jinsei bimi raisan	Ali Project	
29	LoveLive! Sunshine!! Takami Chika First Solo Concert Album ～One More Sunshine Story～	Anju Inami	
29	Anima	Daoko	
29	Watashi ga motete dōsunda	Girls^{2}	
29	Love Covers II	Kim Jae-joong	
29	Brave Souls	Osaka Shunkashuto	
29	II	Satoshi Hayashibe	
29	Elysion~Rakuen e no pureryūdo~Re:Master Production	Sound Horizon	
29	Elysion~Rakuen gensō monogatari kumikyoku~Re:Master Production	Sound Horizon	
29	Evergreen	SparQlew	
29	Unfinished	Unlucky Morpheus	
29	Plagiarism	Yorushika	
31	"Vazzrock" play of color Series 4 "Strong taste"	Masahiro Yamanaka, Yukitoshi Kikuchi, Takuya Satō	
31	SQ "Cards" Series 3 Quell "Heart"	Quell	

=== August ===
Date	Album	Artist	Ref.
5	Live:Live	AK-69	
5	The Voyages	Crystal Lake	
5	Super Cool EP	Empire	
5	The Idolmaster Master Artist 4 01 Haruka Amami	Eriko Nakamura	
5	Water Drop	Kaori Ishihara	
5	Stray Sheep	Kenshi Yonezu	
5	Fūkei Ni Natte	Kobore	
5	The Idolmaster Master Artist 4 03 Yayoi Takatsuki	Mayako Nigo	
5	Friends	Namba69	
5	Special Thanks!	Nao Tōyama	
5	Deep Blue	Sora tob sakana	
5	Ayumi Part 1	Takuya Nakazawa	
5	19Box	Tsuki Amano	
5	Yayuyo	Yayuyo	
5	The Idolmaster Master Artist 4 02 Takane Shijō	Yumi Hara	
5	Hogarakana Hifutote Fufuku	Zutomayo	
7	7×2 Deadly Sins	After the Rain	
11	Life	Crown Pop	
12	Starry Line	Argonavis	
12	V	My First Story	
12	Clearly	Yuka Iguchi	
18	Gatherway <Red Ban>	Melissa	
18	Gatherway <Blue Ban>	Melissa	
19	Hana no Uta / I beg you / Haru wa Yuku	Aimer	
19	Anzen Chitai in Kōshien kyūjō "sayonara gēmu"	Anzen Chitai	
19	Anti Conformist Superstar	Bis	
19	2020	Eastern Youth	
19	B.L.E.S.S.E.D	EXID	
19	We Go	Hiro Shimono	
19	4	Hitorie	
19	To Idols to Us to You	Melon Batake A Go Go	
19	Mugen no Jūnin	Ningen Isu	
19	Era	Raise a Suilen	
19	Utopia	Sou	
19	Sukima No Hanataba ~Smile Song Selection~	Sukima Switch	
19	Hamidashimono	Tomori Kusunoki	
19	Parade	Win Morisaki	
19	Smoke	Yuki Akira	
25	Step by Step	Sandal Telephone	
26	Oh my god	(G)I-dle	
26	Bedroom Joule	Alexandros	
26	Battle Boys Best 2017–2020	Battle Boys	
26	TV Anime/Data Carddass "Aikatsu Friends!" Best Album Best Friends	Best Friends!	
26	Maze	Chelmico	
26	Katsute tensaidatta oretachi e	Creepy Nuts	
26	Tokyo Haze	Gero	
26	Gift	Given	
26	Futari no	Harumaki Gohan	
26	Hateful	Hīragi Kirai	
26	Heartbreaker	Marie Ueda	
26	Takahashi senshūraku	Mariko Takahashi	
26	Re>Animator	Mary's Blood	
26	One Day	Masayoshi Yamazaki	
26	Jōmino	Minori Suzuki	
26	Note	Mone Kamishiraishi	
26	Nagashi No Ooja Vintage Song Covers	Ms.Ooja	
26	Futures	Nothing's Carved In Stone	
26	Welcome My Friend	Okamoto's	
26	Roman	Pedro	
26	Tanimura bungaku-sen 2020 ~Grace~	Shinji Tanimura	
26	The Traveling Life	Sōhei Oyamada	
26	Roman (Re:Master Production	Sound Horizon	
26	Demagog	Tatsuya Kitani	
26	Barometz	Yūko Andō	
30	Uta tte kiri rin pa	Sho Kiryuin	
31	Hatsune Miku "Magical Mirai 2020" Official Album	Hatsune Miku	

=== September ===
Date	Album	Artist	Ref.
2	Kimi ni okuru Bye Bye	10jin Actor	
2	BBHF1 -Nanka suru seinen-	BBHF	
2	The MC	Hilcrhyme	
2	L&	King & Prince	
2	Rinne	Maki	
2	Just Believe!!!	Nijigasaki High School Idol Club	
2	Blame Summer EP	Radwimps	
2	Garden	Saori Hayami	
2	Take Me	Saucy Dog	
2	Candy Cruise EP	Shank	
2	Mix10th	Silent Siren	
2	Paint it, Blue	Sora Amamiya	
2	Bluesman	Tak Matsumoto	
2	Utautai	Takashi Matsuo	
2	Frontiers	Taro Hakase	
2	Jewerly Fish	Tophamhat-kyo	
2	"Helios Rising Heroes" Theme Music "Rise Sunshine"	Toshiyuki Toyonaga, Wataru Hatano	
2	Acoustic for you.	Yoshino Nanjō	
8	Aki no wakusei, hāto wa naitoburū.	Kaede	
9	Heard That There's Good Pasta	Aimyon	
9	Legend – Metal Galaxy (Day 1) (Metal Galaxy World Tour In Japan Extra Show)	Babymetal	
9	Legend – Metal Galaxy (Day 2) (Metal Galaxy World Tour In Japan Extra Show)	Babymetal	
9	Culture	Climbgrow	
9	MuuSee	Miyu Sakihi	
9	No Good	N/A	
9	24H	Seventeen	
9	"Shōjo Kageki Review Starlight Rondo Rondo Rondo" Shudaika CD "Saisei Sanbi Kyoku"	Starlight Kuku Gumi	
10	Reunion	OxT	
16	Continue?	A.B.C-Z	
16	Y/our Song	Beni	
16	Matatakusekaini Aiwo Yurase	Chico with HoneyWorks	
16	Funeral	Hazuki	
16	Gundam Song Covers 2	Hiroko Moriguchi	
16	Kayō Kikō 19 ~Setouchi Azushima~	Kaori Mizumori	
16	The Third Summer of Love	Lovely Summer-chan	
16	Light Up Ambivalenz	Real	
16	True Gazer	Shunichi Toki	
16	Dress Up	The Pinballs	
16	#Twice3	Twice	
18	Playboy of Reiwa	T-Ace	
19	LoveLive! Sunshine!! Sakurauchi Riko First Solo Concert Album ~Pianoforte Monologue~	Rikako Aida	
21	LoveLive! Sunshine!! Kurosawa Ruby First Solo Concert Album ~Red Gem Wink~	Ai Furihata	
21	Abracadabra	Buck-Tick	
22	Asoviva	Frederic	
23	Moonrise	Ai Furihata	
23	Second Palette	Color Creation	
23	House	Girlfriend	
23	Gundam Build Divers Series Original Soundtrack	Hideakira Kimura	
23	Hinatazaka	Hinatazaka46	
23	Soldier Of Fortune 30th Anniversary Limited Edition	Loudness	
23	Between the Black and Gray	Monoeyes	
23	Tsuki ni Sumu Hoshinōta ~nano.ripe 10th Anniversary Best~	Nano Ripe	
23	Universe: The History	Pentagon	
23	Cool & Country	Ringomusume	
23	Chō Mitchaku! Tori Tsukare CD 'Yūgen Romantica Saikōchō' Dai go no Nazo Yamatanoorochi Iriya	Shinnosuke Tachibana	
23	Sky-Hi's The Best	Sky-Hi	
23	The Cro-Magnons Tsuā Punch 2019–2020	The Cro-Magnons	
23	Cheddar Flavor	Wanima	
23	Ai	Xaa Xaa	
23	Solid State Survivor (Yellow Clear Vinyl Edition)	Yellow Magic Orchestra	
23	Garandō	Zookarade4u	
28	CNBLUE Live CD Collection -Memories-	CNBLUE	
30	Evoke II 2010–2020	Aldious	
30	Blue Film -Revival-	Cali Gari	
30	Jacks or Better ～No More Bet～ Dealer Jill Laglane	Domon Atsushi	
30	Libertine Dreams	Inoran	
30	Passenger	Kotaro Oshio	
30	Home Made Chu!?	M!lk	
30	Shinonome	Marasy	
30	Character Song Collection "Full Of Love!!"	Megumi Nakajima	
30	Singalong	Ryokuoushoku Shakai	
30	Blue Pop Reverberation	Sangatsu no Phantasia	
30	Seiko Matsuda 2020	Seiko Matsuda	
30	Moira (Re:Master Production)	Sound Horizon	
30	Tebasen Best Mix -Tebasaki Sensation DJ Mix Vol.1- Mixed by DJ Jille	Tebasaki Sensation	
30	Tebasen Best Mix -Tebasaki Sensation DJ Mix Vol.2- Mixed by DJ SZNA	Tebasaki Sensation	
30	Tebasen The Best -Tebasaki Sensation Amakara Best Vol.1-	Tebasaki Sensation	
30	TTJ Land	TTJ	
30	Patrick Vegee	Unison Square Garden	
30	You need the Tank-top	Yabai T-Shirts Yasan	
30	Super Jet Super	Yumemiru Adolescence	

=== October ===
Date	Album	Artist	Ref.
7	Love Live! Sunshine!! Aqours Chronicle (2015～2017)	Aqours	
7	Green Light	B Pressure	
7	Walking On Fire	Glim Spanky	
7	Power Chord	Haruka Kudō	
7	Eien Yori Nagai Isshun: Ano Koro, Tashika ni Sonzaishita Watashitachi	Keyakizaka46	
7	City	Koutaro Nishiyama	
7	Midori Oka 15-Shūnen Best Album	Midori Oka	
7	Joker	Mika Nakashima	
7	Akiyasumi 2020	Momoko Hayashi	
7	Motoharu Sano Greatest Song Collection 1980–2004	Motoharu Sano	
7	The Essential Tracks Motoharu Sano & The Coyote Band 2005–2020	Motoharu Sano & The Coyote Band	
7	Omowakudori	Naoto Inti Raymi	
7	Drive	NU'EST	
7	J.Y.Park Best	Park Jin-young	
7	Unknown	Reona	
7	After Rain	Saki Misaka	
7	Zard Tribute II	Sard Underground	
7	Pass The Beat	Surface	
7	Me Me	Tetora	
7	Real Light Real Darkness	Yusuke Chiba -Snake On The Beach-	
13	Seiseiruten	Kiyoshi Hikawa	
14	Stargazer	Daisuke Ono	
14	Dosco prime	Dreams Come True	
14	Sharing	Hitomi Yaida	
14	Bocchi 3	KanoeRana	
14	Fragile	Lamp in Terren	
14	Leo-Nine	Lisa	
14	Cheer	Magokoro Brothers	
14	=+	Shogo Sakamoto	
14	Love Song Covers 3 – You & Me	Tomoyo Harada	
14	Tokyo Singing	Wagakki Band	
20	Never Stop	Footloop	
21	2020	A Flood of Circle	
21	ClariS 10th Anniversary Best -Green Star-	ClariS	
21	ClariS 10th Anniversary Best -Pink Moon-	ClariS	
21	Now	Crazy Ken Band	
21	Dōnika naru hibi	CreepHyp	
21	Standard ~The Ballad Best~	Eikichi Yazawa	
21	Violet Evergarden: Echo Through Eternity	Evan Call	
21	Precious Stones	Gems Company	
21	Gen Hoshino Singles Box "Gratitude"	Gen Hoshino	
21	Nē minna daisukidayo	Ging Nang Boyz	
21	Ai No Himitsu	Humbert Humbert	
21	Twelve	Iz*One	
21	Oreno Request	Juju	
21	S.A.L	Kyono	
21	NHK "Okaasan to Issho" Saishin Best Kimi Iro	Okaasan to Issho	
21	Supermarket	Sakura Fujiwara	
21	Marchen (Re:Master Production)	Sound Horizon	
21	All Time Singles ~Super Premium Best~	The Blue Hearts	
21	All Time Memorials II	The Blue Hearts	
21	10	Tricot	
21	On Stage!	Tokino Sora	
21	Personality	Yu Takahashi	
21	Letters and Doll ～Looking back on the memories of Violet Evergarden～	Yui Ishikawa	
27	Fioreclad	Star Fiorenerd	
27	4Tunes	Velle.J	
28	Teppan	Berry Goodman	
28	Lullaby	Charan-Po-Rantan	
28	Heart Box	Chay	
28	255	Monsterz Mate	
28	Prismatic Colors	Nijisanji	
28	Stardust Revue Rakuen Ongaku-sai 2019 Ōsakajō on Gakudō	Stardust Revue	
28	Creme de la Creme	T-Square	
28	Baumkuchen	The High-Lows	
28	Homarus	The High-Lows	
28	The High-Lows	The High-Lows	
28	Burn the Secret	Wands	
28	Saijōkyū Good Songs [30th Anniversary Best Album]	Yumiko Takahashi	
28	Shinkoiwa	Zorn	

=== November ===
Date	Album	Artist	Ref.
3	This Is Arashi	Arashi	
3	Heavenly Music	Haruomi Hosono	
3	HoSoNoVa	Haruomi Hosono	
3	Vu Ja De	Haruomi Hosono	
4	Onshano CM Song	C&K	
4	40 ~Forty~	Exile Atsushi	
4	The very best of FripSide 2009–2020	FripSide	
4	The very best of FripSide -moving ballads-	FripSide	
4	Granrodeo Singles Collection "Rodeo Beat Shake"	Granrodeo	
4	Omni Sight Seeing	Haruomi Hosono	
4	Medicine Compilation	Haruomi Hosono	
4	20th Anniversary Complete Box	Keisuke Yamauchi	
4	Aiwoshirazunimahouhatsukaenai	Macaroni Enpitsu	
4	Life is...	Miyu Irino	
4	Color Me Purple	Nanaka Suwa	
4	All In	Stray Kids	
4	Brand New Caravan	Tjiros	
10	Lalida	Imfact	
11	Zealot City	A Crowd of Rebellion	
11	[Evolve]	Angelo	
11	The Idolmaster Master Artist 4 06 Ami Futami	Asami Shimoda	
11	Heavy Mental Attitude	Dohatsuten	
11	Odoru jugyō shirīzu toranomaki	Egu-splosion	
11	Unchained	Han-kun	
11	The Idolmaster Master Artist 4 04 Makoto Kikuchi	Hiromi Hirata	
11	Haha ~ Nihon no haha o utau ~	Kohei Fukuda	
11	#4 -Retornado-	Ling Tosite Sigure	
11	The Idolmaster Master Artist 4 05 Hibiki Ganaha	Manami Numakura	
11	Classic Ivory 35th Anniversary Orchestral Best	Miki Imai	
11	00 (Ōtsū)	Orbit	
11	Talio	Ryusenkei, Hitomitoi	
11	In the Fairlife	Shōgo Hamada	
11	Period	Shota Shimizu	
11	Sunflower	Shuka Saitō	
11	Strawberry Prince	Strawberry Prince	
11	Need	Subaru Shibutani	
11	Kingdom Hearts -III, II.8, Unchained x & Union x[Cross]- Original Soundtrack	Yoko Shimomura, Takeharu Ishimoto, Tsuyoshi Sekito	
13	Femme Fatale	Femme Fatale	
17	Kotoko Anime song's complete album "The Fable"	Kotoko	
17	Nigami 17th birthday!! O	Nigami 17th birthday	
18	Prism	Alisa Takigawa	
18	Q.E.D	Blue Encount	
18	Powers of Ten	Def Tech	
18	Daijina mono / #Kizunaplus	Girls^{2}	
18	Romance	Hiroji Miyamoto	
18	Kirinji 20132020	Kirinji	
18	So Special Christmas	Misia	
18	Long for	Omoinotake	
18	#GirlsSpkOut	Taeyeon	
18	Bessekai ryokō ~A Trip in Any Other World~	The Collectors	
18	2020	Uchikubigokumon-Doukoukai	
18	Portas	Yuji Nakada	
18	Night Walk	Yuri Komagata	
24	HiKiKoMoRi	Chiai Fujikawa	
24	Chō uirusubasutāzu hīrō-ban	Shin Seiki Epikkusuta God	
24	Chō uirusubasutāzu vu~iran-ban	Secret Society Nirverge	
25	Paradox Live Exhibition Show -Bae-	Bae, The Cat's Whiskers, Cozmez, Akanyatsura	
25	"Propaganda" to "Propaganda"	Bis	
25	Hysteria	Chihiro Onitsuka	
25	The Old Testament in Hell Chapter 1	Damian Hamada's Creatures	
25	Neth	Enth	
25	Kishikaisei	Garnidelia	
25	The Star	JO1	
25	23-Sai	Kan	
25	Shin majo zukan	Kayoko Yoshizawa	
25	Covers -Woman & Man-	Miliyah Kato	
25	Tokyo -30th Anniversary Edition-	Misato Watanabe	
25	Ontology	Rain Drops	
25	Honey	Rei	
25	My Toybox ~Rie Kitagawa Pretty Cure Song Collection ~	Rie Kitagawa	
25	Nonocular violet	Sawao Yamanaka	
25	Ebi chū akirei to kutsuwamushi to ongaku no kodama dai shite 'chi ~yuuon' 2020	Shiritsu Ebisu Chugaku	
25	Hisshi	Syudou	
25	Boku no naka no shōnen (2020 Remaster)	Tatsuro Yamashita	
25	Pocket Music (2020 Remaster)	Tatsuro Yamashita	
25	Live in Tokyo	Tetsuya Kakihara	
25	Soul to Soul	Tomoyasu Hotei	
25	Rainbow	Urashimasakatasen	
25	Unify -10th Anniversary Best-	Valshe	
25	What's "standard"!?	Wasuta	
25	Delicious Smile!	Wataten5	
25	Hakuna Matata	Zig Zag	
25	Einsatz	Zool	
27	Chameleon	Sekai no Owari	
28	Uta tte kiri rin pa 2nd Season	Sho Kiryuin	

=== December ===
Date	Album	Artist	Ref.
1	The City In The Deep Sea	Yumi Matsutoya	
2	Supernova	B-Project	
2	Star ~Remake Best 3~	Hilcrhyme	
2	Lantana	Keiko	
2	Gift	Keisuke Yamauchi	
2	Sympa	King Gnu	
2	Tokyo Rendez-Vous	King Gnu	
2	Angel + Monster [My Name Is...]	Koda Kumi	
2	Who I Am	Milet	
2	With	Mika Nakashima	
2	Koko ni iru yo	Miyuki Nakajima	
2	Soundtracks	Mr. Children	
2	Kiniro no Ribbon	Seiko Matsuda	
2	Applause	Straightener	
2	Mud Shakes	The Cro-Magnons	
2	Marriage	Yu Shirota	
8	Furimuite kyun shite.	Kimi ni Munekyun	
8	Akira	Masaharu Fukuyama	
9	AAA Mix CD	AAA	
9	Nanakorobi Nanaoki	Akari Nanawo	
9	Boot up!!	Chage	
9	Gin no Yuri / Banzai Rizing!!! / Hikari no Akuma	Fantome Iris, Fūjin Rizing!, Epsilon Phi	
9	Powers	Hitsujibungaku	
9	20×20	Junna	
9	King	Kanaria	
9	Emeralo Type	Nagi Yanagi	
9	Bakutan	Non Stop Rabbit	
9	Re:New Acoustic Life	OAU	
9	Synonym	Passepied	
9	Neo Neo	Ryukku to Soine Gohan	
9	Kintsugi	Seiko Oomori	
9	Golden Echo	SF9	
9	35-Nen de 35-kyoku "ai to tomo" ~Boku no Melody kiminotameni~	Tube	
9	Wakana Covers ~Anime Classics~	Wakana	
9	Uta-ben Cover	Yoshiko Hanzaki	
12	Shonentai 35th Anniversary Best	Shonentai	
15	Admiral's Good Time	Kohmi Hirose	
16	Reiwa Ninen, Uten Kekkō	Amazarashi	
16	Wings	Ayaka Ohashi	
16	CY8ER	CY8ER	
16	Undead Alice	Deco*27	
16	Million Days ~Ano Ni~Tsu no watashi to, utae~ Mixdd by DJ Kazu	DJ Kazu	
16	Dress Re Cord	Enako	
16	Fab! -Music speaks.-	Hey! Say! JUMP	
16	Dig-Rock Impish Crow Mini Album "Faith"	Impish Crow	
16	Aim	Kaede Higuchi	
16	5 Kill Stars	Piggs	
16	Nanimono	Polkadot Stingray	
16	Dig-Rock Rubia Leopard Mini Album "Trigger"	Rubia Leopard	
16	Hajimari no Uta	Shunya Ohira	
16	Millions of Oblivion	The Pinballs	
16	Union Box	Unione	
23	Make Up	Ai Furihata	
23	Tōken ranbu - Online - kinji-kyoku-shū 其 No.3	Akiko Shikata, Ryota Tomaru	
23	10 Babymetal Years	Babymetal	
23	The Old Testament in Hell Chapter 2	Damian Hamada's Creatures	
23	Kaikai Kitan / Ao No Waltz	Eve	
23	Kamigami no Album	Group Tamashii	
23	Hayatosm	Hayato Sumino	
23	Hachisunohana ga hiraku toki	Jun Shibata	
23	O album	KinKi Kids	
23	Chocolate Cosmos	Koji Tamaki	
23	From Fairytail	Makoto Furukawa	
23	All Time Best	Miho Nakayama	
23	Rhythmic Flavor	Miku Itō	
23	Phoenix	Maki Ohguro	
23	Strive	Passcode	
23	I Am Me	Sachika Misawa	
23	In Bloom	Sōma Saitō	
23	Burn it Black EP	Super Dragon	
23	Chōzetsu shōjo Complete 2010-2020	Super Girls	
23	"Theatrical Version Pokémon Coco" Theme Song Collection	Taiiku Okazaki	
23	Super Handsome Collection "Get It Back!"	Team Handsome!	
23	Tokimeki ga subete	Chō Tokimeki Sendenbu	
23	Chapter I	Yuki Nakashima	
28	E-girls	E-girls	
28	Thank You	Sudannayuzuyully	
30	Awake	Ivvy	

== Disbanding and retiring artists ==
=== Disbanding ===
- Carry Loose
- E-girls
- Fairies
- Group Tamashii
- Gugudan
- Hachimitsu Rocket
- Magnolia Factory
- Party Rockets GT
- PrizmaX
- Sora tob sakana
- SudannaYuzuYully
- Tegomass
- Uijin

=== Retiring ===
- Chisato Okai
- Manami Numakura
- Mayu Watanabe

=== Going on hiatus ===
- AAA
- Arashi
- Baroque
- College Cosmos
- Good Morning America
- Masahiko Kondō
- Ladybaby
- Mrs. Green Apple
- Marius Yo

== See also ==
- 2020 in Japan
- 2020 in Japanese television
- List of Japanese films of 2020
