= 2024 in Japanese music =

The year 2024 in Japanese music.

== Debuts ==
=== Debuting groups ===
- Ae! group
- Cutie Street
- F5ve
- Issue
- Mameshiba no Taigun Tonai Bousho a.k.a. MonsterIdol
- Me:I
- NCT Wish
- Nexz
- Number_i
- Sweet Steady

=== Debuting soloists ===
- Ami Maeshima
- Ayaka Nanase
- Hina Suguta
- Hina Tachibana
- Nagisa Aoyama
- Shōya Chiba
- Yuki Tanaka

== Number-ones ==
- Oricon number-one albums
- Oricon number-one singles
- Billboard Japan number-one albums
- Billboard Japan Hot 100 number-one singles

== Albums released ==
=== January ===
Date	Album	Artist	Label	Ref.
17	Evolve	Nemophila	Masterworks	

=== March ===
Date	Album	Artist	Label	Ref.
13	Nautilus	Sekai no Owari	Virgin	

=== April ===
Date	Album	Artist	Label	Ref.
10	New Kawaii	Fruits Zipper	Asobi Music	
12	E-Side 3	Yoasobi	Sony Japan	
17	Classy Crush	@onefive	Avex Trax	

=== May ===
Date	Album	Artist	Label	Ref.
29	Carnival	Ringo Sheena	EMI	

=== July ===
Date	Album	Artist	Label	Ref.
10	Zanmu	Ado	Virgin	

=== August ===
Date	Album	Artist	Label	Ref.
21	Lost Corner	Kenshi Yonezu	Sony Japan	

=== September ===
Date	Album	Artist	Label	Ref.
25	Epic Narratives	Band-Maid	Pony Canyon	

=== November ===
Date	Album	Artist	Label	Ref.
13	Giant	Stray Kids	Epic Japan	

=== December ===
Date	Album	Artist	Label	Ref.
25	Nantettatte AKB48	AKB48	EMI	
25	Wishful	NCT Wish	SM, Avex	

== Disbanding and retiring artists ==
=== Disbanding ===
- Candy Go!Go!
- Chai
- Crown Pop
- Faky
- Kamiyado
- Moonchild
- Tonai Bousho
- TUYU

=== Going on hiatus ===
- Mameshiba no Taigun
- Migma Shelter
- Ryutist

== See also ==
- 2024 in Japan
  - Music of Japan
