= Tsuyu =

Tsuyu may refer to:

- East Asian rainy season (梅雨)
- Dipping sauce or soup served with Japanese noodles
- Tsuyu Asui (蛙吹 梅雨), a character in the manga and anime series My Hero Academia
- Yotsuyu Brutus (ヨツユ・ブルトゥス), an antagonist in the video game Final Fantasy XIV
- TUYU (ツユ), a music group from Japan.
