= Kemonotachi no Yoru/Rondo =

2019 song by Buck-Tick

"Kemonotachi no Yoru/RONDO"

Single by Buck-Tick

from the album Abracadabra
- Released: May 22, 2019
- Genre: Rock
- Length: 13:15
- Label: Lingua Sounda (Victor)
- Composer: Hisashi Imai
- Lyricist: Atsushi Sakurai

Buck-Tick singles chronology
| "Moon Sayonara wo Oshiete" (2018) | "Kemonotachi no Yoru/RONDO" (2019) | "Datenshi" (2020) |

"Kemonotachi no Yoru/RONDO" (獣たちの夜/RONDO) is the 38th single by the Japanese rock band Buck-Tick, released on May 22, 2019 on the label Lingua Sounda (Victor). The song "Rondo" is used as the ending theme for the GeGeGe no Kitarō anime since episode 50. Cube Juice, the project of the music producer Nagao Shinichi, participates in track 3 with Kemonotachi no Yoru's remix. The track Kemonotachi no Yoru, in a different version, is part of the album Abracadabra.

== Charts ==
The single peaked at the 4th position on the Oricon charts.

== Track listing ==
All lyrics are written by Atsushi Sakurai; all music is composed by Hisashi Imai.

| No. | Title | Length |
|---|---|---|
| 1. | "Kemonotachi no Yoru" (獣たちの夜) | 2:47 |
| 2. | "Rondo" | 4:49 |
| 3. | "Kemonotachi no Yoru -version of Cube Juice-" (獣たちの夜) | 5:06 |
| Total length: | | 13:15 |

== Personnel ==
- Atsushi Sakurai – vocals
- Hisashi Imai – lead guitar
- Hidehiko "Hide" Hoshino- rhythm guitar
- Yutaka "U-ta" Higuchi- bass
- Yagami Toll – drums

=== Additional musicians ===
- Cube Juice – remix (track 3)
