= Asako =

- Gender: Female

Origin
- Origin: Japanese
- Meaning: Different meanings depending on the kanji used

Asako (written: 麻子, 朝子, 浅子, 亜少子, あさ子 or あさこ in hiragana) from Japanese 麻 (asa) meaning "flax" combined with 子 (ko) meaning "child", is a feminine Japanese given name.

== Notable persons ==
- Asako Dodo (百々 麻子; born 1967), Japanese voice actress
- Asako Hirabayashi, Japanese-American harpsichordist and composer
- Asako Hirooka (広岡 浅子; 1849–1919), Japanese businesswoman, banker and college founder
- Asako Ideue (井手上 麻子; born 1987), Japanese women's footballer
- Asako Ito (いとう あさこ; born 1970), Japanese comedian
- Asako Kishi (岸 朝子; born 1923), Japanese journalist
- Asako Kōzuki (春花 亜少子) Japanese voice actress
- Asako Narahashi (楢橋 朝子; born 1959), Japanese photographer
- Asako Shirakura (白倉 麻子; born 1977), Japanese voice actress
- Asako Tajimi (多治見 麻子; born 1972), Japanese volleyball player
- Asako Takakura (高倉 麻子; born 1968), Japanese women's footballer and manager
- Asako Toki (土岐 麻子; born 1976), Japanese singer and composer
- Asako Watanabe (渡辺 麻子; born 1959), Japanese sprint canoeist
- Asako Yuzuki (柚木 麻子; born 1981), Japanese writer

== Fictional characters ==
- Asako Makimiya (牧宮 麻子), a character in the anime series Darker than Black
- Asako Natsume (夏目 あさ子), a character in the manga series My Little Monster
- Asako Nakamura (中村 麻子), a character in the manga series Ushio and Tora
- Asako Yamagishi (山岸 朝子), a character in the manga series The Summer Hikaru Died

== Films & Television ==
- Asako I & II (寝ても覚めても, Netemo Sametemo, "whether asleep or awake"), a 2018 Japanese romance drama film directed by Ryūsuke Hamaguchi.
