= Datenshi =

2020 song by Buck-Tick

- Regular edition cover

Single by Buck-Tick

from the album Abracadabra
- Released: January 29, 2020
- Genre: Rock
- Length: 7:14
- Label: Lingua Sounda
- Composers: Hisashi Imai and Hidehiko Hoshino
- Lyricist: Atsushi Sakurai

Buck-Tick singles chronology
"Kemonotachi no Yoru/Rondo" (2019)	"Datenshi" (2020)	"Moonlight Escape" (2020)

"Datenshi" (堕 天使) is the thirty-ninth single from the Japanese rock band Buck-Tick. It was released on January 29, 2020, by the label Lingua Sounda in three editions: a regular edition and two limited editions. The main track, "Datenshi", in a different version, is on the album Abracadabra.

== Production ==
The limited edition cover was created by Aquirax Uno and the regular edition cover is designed by Kazunori Akita and photographed by Yosuke Komatsu.

== Charts ==
Datenshi peaked at the sixth place on the Oricon charts.

== Track listing ==
All lyrics are written by Atsushi Sakurai.

No.	Title	Music	Length
1.	"Datenshi"	Hisashi Imai	3:32
2.	"Luna Park"	Hidehiko Hoshino	3:42
Total length:			7:14

Limited edition bonus track
No.	Title	Length
3.	"THE DAY IN QUESTION 2019 (Live Track)"

== Personnel ==
- Atsushi Sakurai – singing
- Hisashi Imai – lead guitar
- Hidehiko Hoshino – rhythm guitar
- Yutaka Higuchi – bass
- Yagami Toll – drums

=== Production ===
- Kazunori Akita – art design
- Aquirax Uno – limited edition cover
