= Moonlight Escape =

2020 song by Buck-Tick

- Regular edition cover

Single by Buck-Tick

from the album Abracadabra
- B-side: "Kogoeru"
- Released: August 26, 2020
- Genre: Rock
- Length: 8:32
- Label: Lingua Sounda (Victor Entertainment)
- Composers: Hisashi Imai and Hidehiko Hoshino
- Lyricist: Atsushi Sakurai

Buck-Tick singles chronology
"Datenshi" (2020)	"Moonlight Escape" (2020)	"Go-Go B-T TRAIN" (2021)

Music video
- "Moonlight Escape" on YouTube

"Moonlight Escape" is a single by Japanese rock band Buck-Tick. It was released on August 26, 2020, by Lingua Sounda (Victor Entertainment) in three editions, with the B-side "Kogoeru". Both tracks are part of the album Abracadabra.

== Production and release ==
The album was released in two editions. The Limited Edition A comes with a Blu-ray disc, and Limited Edition B comes with a DVD, both containing the music video for the title song.

Recording began shortly after the release of the previous single “Datenshi” and it was expected to be released in the summer, but the COVID-19 pandemic slightly delayed the plans.

The B-side "Kogoeru" (凍える) was chosen as the ending theme for the drama Yami Shibai.

== Commercial performance ==
The single reached 13th position on the Oricon Singles Chart and remained on the chart for six weeks.

== Track listing ==
All lyrics are written by Atsushi Sakurai.

No.	Title	Music	Length
1.	"Moonlight Escape"	Hisashi Imai	4:12
2.	"Kogoeru"	Hidehiko Hoshino	4:20
Total length:			8:32

Limited edition DVD

No.	Title	Length
3.	"Moonlight Escape"

== Personnel ==
- Atsushi Sakurai – vocals
- Hisashi Imai – lead guitar
- Hidehiko Hoshino – rhythm guitar
- Yutaka Higuchi – bass
- Yagami Toll – drums
