= Abracadabra (Buck-Tick album) =

Studio album by Buck-Tick
- Released: September 21, 2020
- Recorded: Spring 2019 – 2020
- Genre: Alternative rock
- Language: Japanese
- Labels: Lingua Sounda, JPU Records

Buck-Tick chronology
No.0 (2018)	Abracadabra (2020)	Izora (2023)

Singles from Abracadabra
- 1. "Kemonotachi no Yoru/Rondo" Released: May 22, 2019; 2. "Datenshi" Released: January 29, 2020; 3. "Moonlight Escape" Released: August 26, 2020

Abracadabra is the 22nd studio album by the Japanese rock band Buck-Tick, released on September 21, 2020 by the label Lingua Sounda, subdivision of Victor Entertainment and November 20, 2020 internationally by JPU Records. It was released in two editions in Japan: regular and limited in three formats: CD + Blu-ray, cassette and vinyl. Internationally it was released on CD and cassette with bonus tracks.

== Background ==
The name "Abracadabra", taken from the lyrics of the song "Eureka", was chosen by lead guitarist and songwriter Hisashi Imai. In an interview with BARKS, Imai says they started composing the album in the middle of spring 2019. Due to the COVID-19 pandemic, the recordings were suspended for a month.

Abracadabra was directed by Junichi Tanaka and the covers were produced by Kazunori Akita.

The album features three new recordings of previously released songs. "Kemonotachi no Yoru" had previously been released as a double A-side single alongside the non-album song "Rondo" a year prior, and "Datenshi" had been released as a single earlier the same year. Both songs appear in new remixed arrangements performed by frequent Buck-Tick collaborator YOW-ROW of the band Gari. "Kogoeru" had been released one month earlier as the B-side to the "Moonlight Escape" single and appears on the album in a new remixed form courtesy of their longtime collaborator Cube Juice.

Following the album's release in Japan it was announced that the band had partnered with London-based label JPU Records to release an international special edition of Abracadabra, marking the first time in the band's history that one of their albums was officially distributed outside of Asia. The international edition comes with a new cover design and 4 bonus tracks. Initially announced with a November 2020 release date, it was eventually pushed to February 2021 due to production delays caused by the COVID-19 pandemic.

== Tour ==
Due to the pandemic, the album promotion shows with audience became impracticable. Buck-Tick performed the online concert "ABRACADABRA LIVE ON THE NET" on September 21.

== Chart performance ==
Abracadabra peaked at the third position on the Oricon Albums Chart and sold about 15,902 copies in its first week. It peaked at 5th place on Billboard Japan.

== Track listing ==
No.	Title	Lyrics	Music	Length
1.	"Peace"		Imai	2:47
2.	"Que Sera Sera Elegy" (ケセラセラ エレジー)	Imai	Imai	4:49
3.	"Urahara-Juku"	Sakurai	Imai	5:06
4.	"Sophia Dream"	Imai	Imai	3:27
5.	"Tsuki no Sabaku" (月の砂漠)	Sakurai	Hoshino	4:01
6.	"Villain"	Sakurai and Imai	Imai	4:56
7.	"Kogoeru Crystal Cube Ver." (凍える Crystal CUBE ver.)	Sakurai	Hoshino	5:14
8.	"Maimu Maimu" (舞夢マイム)	Sakurai	Imai	3:52
9.	"Dance Tengoku" (ダンス天国)	Sakurai	Hoshino	3:48
10.	"Kemonotachi no Yoru Yow-Row Ver." (獣たちの夜 YOW-ROW ver.)	Sakurai	Imai	4:06
11.	"Datenshi Yow-Row Ver." (堕天使 YOW-ROW ver.)	Sakurai	Imai	3:31
12.	"Moonlight Escape"	Sakurai	Imai	4:11
13.	"Eureka" (ユリイカ)	Sakurai and Imai	Imai	3:43
14.	"Boukyaku" (忘却)	Sakurai	Imai	4:43
Total length:				58:15

International Edition Bonus Tracks
No.	Title	Length
15.	"Moon Sayonara wo Oshiete (Single Ver.)"
16.	"Kogoeru (Single Ver.)"
17.	"Datenshi (Single Ver.)"
18.	"Kemonotachi no Yoru (Single Ver.)"

Blu-Ray/DVD
No.	Title	Length
1.	"Kemonotachi No Yoru Yow-Row Ver." (獣たちの夜 YOW-ROW ver.)
2.	"Moonlight Escape"
3.	"Kogoeru Crystal Cube Ver." (凍える Crystal CUBE ver.)

== Personnel ==
=== Buck-Tick ===
- Atsushi Sakurai – singing
- Hisashi Imai – lead guitar, backing vocals
- Hidehiko Hoshino – rhythm guitar
- Yutaka Higuchi – bass
- Toll Yagami – drums

=== Production ===
- Junichi Tanaka – direction
- Kazunori Akita – album covers
