= Ringomusume =

Japanese idol group

Ringomusume りんご娘
- Ringomusume members visit the Ministry of Land, Infrastructure, Transport and Tourism of Japan, May 31st 2024. From left to right: Starking Delicious, Hatsukoi Gurin, Kinsei, Pink Lady.

Background information
- Origin: Hirosaki, Aomori Prefecture, Japan
- Genre: J-pop
- Years active: 2000-present
- Label: Ringo Music
- Members: Pink Lady; Starking Delicious; Hatsukoi Gurin; Kinsei
- Website: www.ringomusume.com

Ringomusume (りんご娘, literally 'Apple Girls') is a Japanese idol group based in Aomori Prefecture, created in 2000 as an attempt to bring attention to the prefecture. They are one of the most well-known Japanese 'local idol' groups, maintaining almost 100% recognition in their native prefecture and holding the title of the 'King of Local Idols' awarded by the Japan Local Idol Promotion Association. They speak in a Japanese dialect local to Aomori Prefecture (Tsugaru), and their theming derives from the prominent apple farming industry of the prefecture. Alongside music performances that span both Aomori and other prefectures of Japan, the members are active in a wide range of activities that aim to boost the profile of Aomori Prefecture and promote local culture. This includes volunteer work, appearances in advertisements and collaborations with local governments.

== History ==
Ringomusume was formed from members of the 'Hirosaki Actors School Project' in 2000, with the aim of revitalising Hirosaki city and boosting sales of apples farmed in Aomori prefecture, along with raising the profile of the location in general. They steadily gained popularity and recognition throughout Aomori prefecture and beyond through song releases and appearances on local TV, eventually leading to them becoming the face of Hirosaki's 'Power Up! Hirosaki Apples' campaign. This marked a turning point in their public recognition, as it may have been one of the first ever times an idol group worked with a local government. This was furthered with appearances by the group on commercial TV in Tokyo, and events taking place in several prefectures across Japan.

Despite this, they would not reach the peak of their commercial success until several years later, in the 'FOURs era', when the group's line-up consisted of Orin, Toki, Jonagold and Ayaka. It was during this period of time, from 2015 to 2022, that their singles would begin to chart in the top 10 on Oricon rankings.

During early 2022, all FOURs era members 'graduated' (left the group), and four new members were introduced: Pink Lady, Starking Delicious, Hatsukoi Gurin and Kinsei. With this formation, the group would hold their largest performance in their history (as of October 2026) to an audience of around ten thousand.

== Discography ==
=== Studio albums ===
- Aomori Ringo (2005)
- RINGOSTARS (2017)
- FOURs (2019)
- Cool & Country (2020)
- Eternity (2021)
- Diamond (2024)
- Dream (2026)

=== Singles ===
- LOVE & SOLDIER (2000)
- Bus Terminal (2002)
- YOU (2002)
- Yuki no Blues (2002)
- Airport (2003)
- Fly High (2003)
- Yaki Ringo (2004)
- Ano Keitora ni Notte (2005)
- Ringo no Kimochi (2006)
- Diet (2007)
- Train (2010)
- Nanbomeja! Apōbai (2012)
- Ringo no Ne. (2015)
- Gugu' (2015)
- Suki Mitai (2015)
- Ringo Star (2017)
- Ame Nochi Hikari (2017)
- 101kaime no Sakura (2018)
- JET GIRL/Natsu no Mikan (2018)
- JAWAMEGI NIGHT!! (2019)
- 0 to 1 no Sekai (2019)
- Ringo no Ki (2020)
- JOMON (2021)
- Ringo ni Koishita Mamekobachi (2022)
- Sakura Diamond (2022)
- Candy Apple ~Koi wa Aserazu~ (2023)
- Saigi Saigi (2024)
- Garasu no Ringotachi/North End All Stars (2025)
- Ringo Ninja (2025)
- YAMABUSHI (2026)
