= List of Hot 100 number-one singles of 2024 (Japan) =

The following is a list of weekly number-one singles on the Billboard Japan Hot 100 chart in 2024.

== Chart history ==
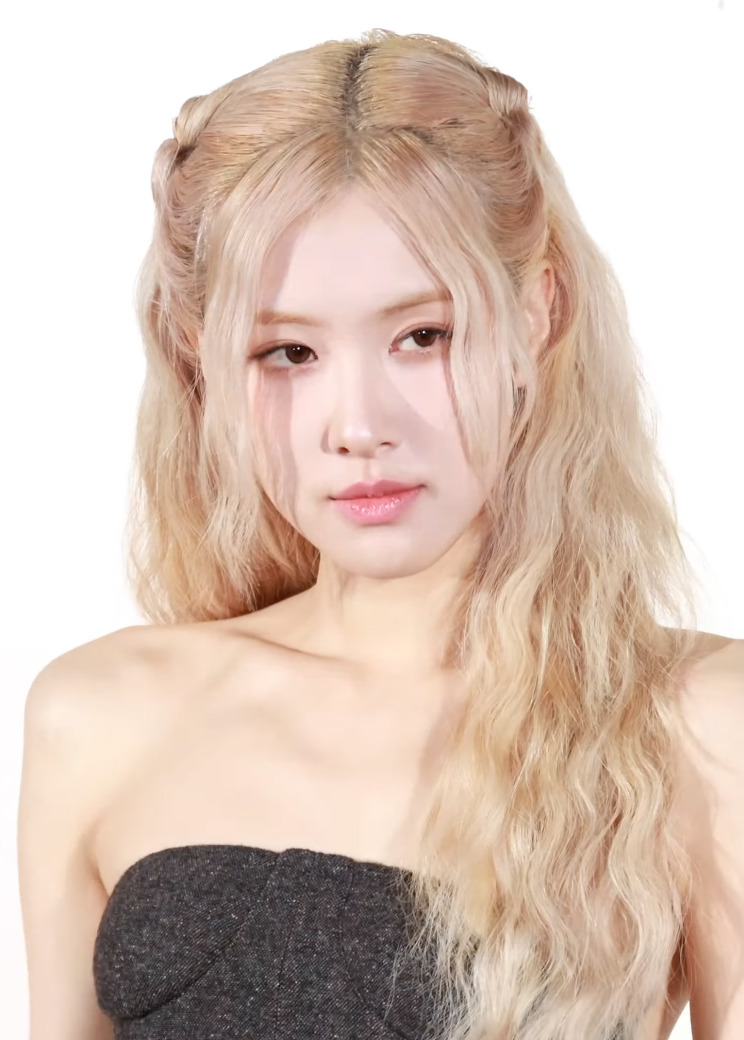
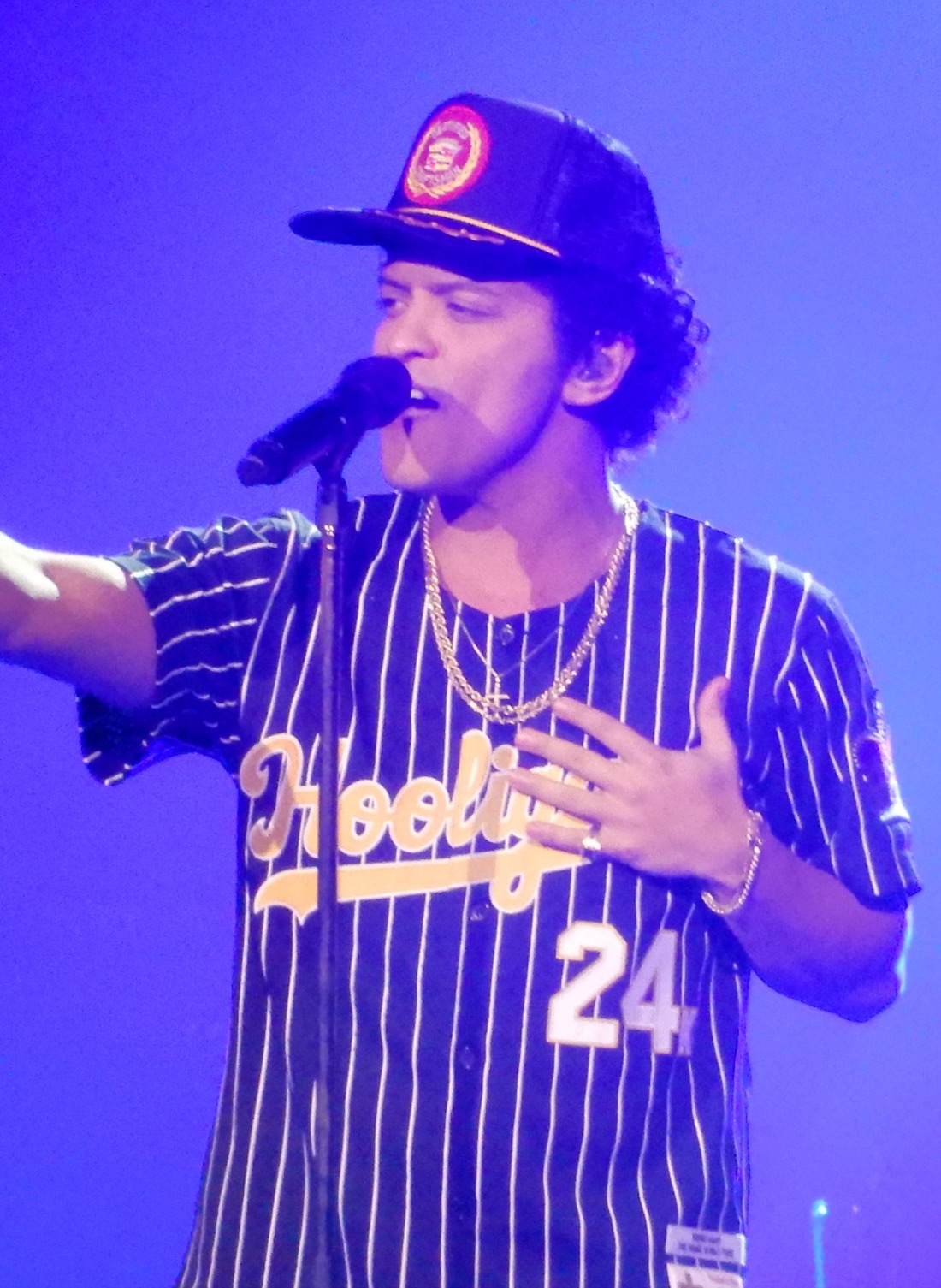
Rosé and Bruno Mars earned their first number-one on their collab hit single "APT.", which topped the chart for four non-consecutive weeks in 2024. The song became the first Western song in over 11 years to top the chart.

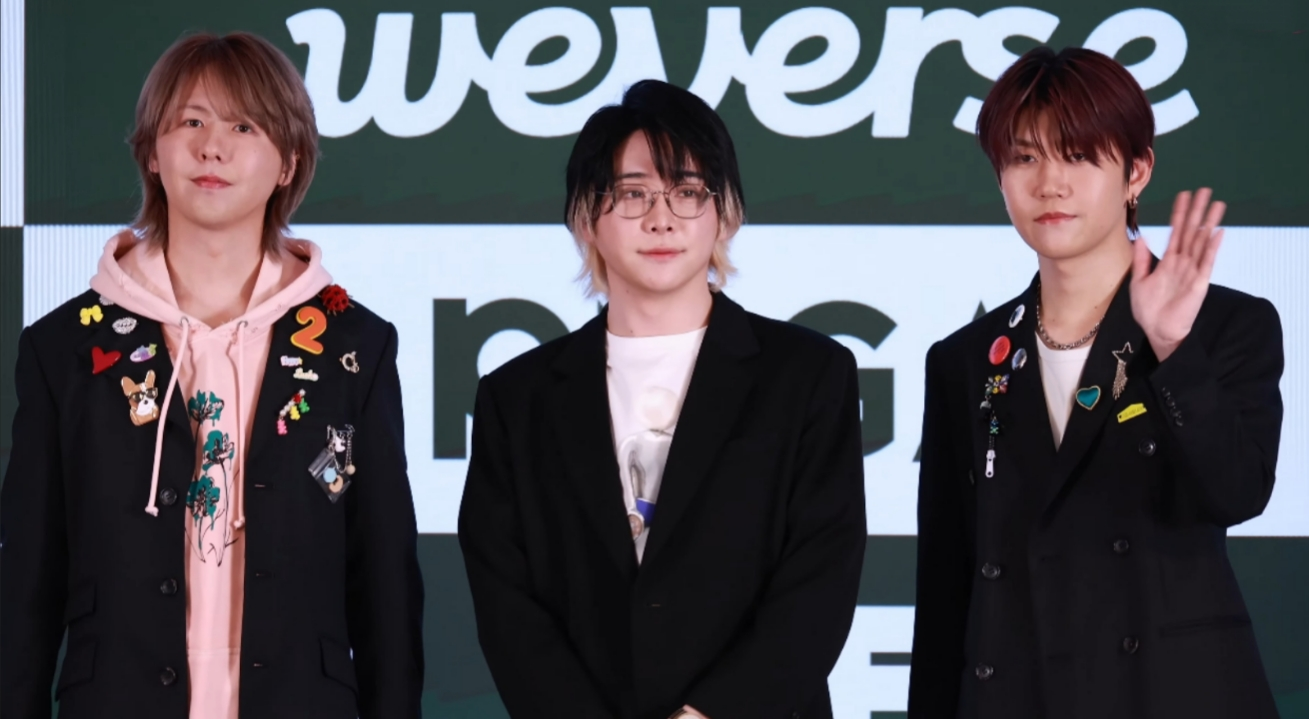
Mrs. Green Apple achieved their first two number-one songs with "Lilac" and "Bitter Vacances". "Lilac" topped the chart for two non-consecutive weeks in 2024.

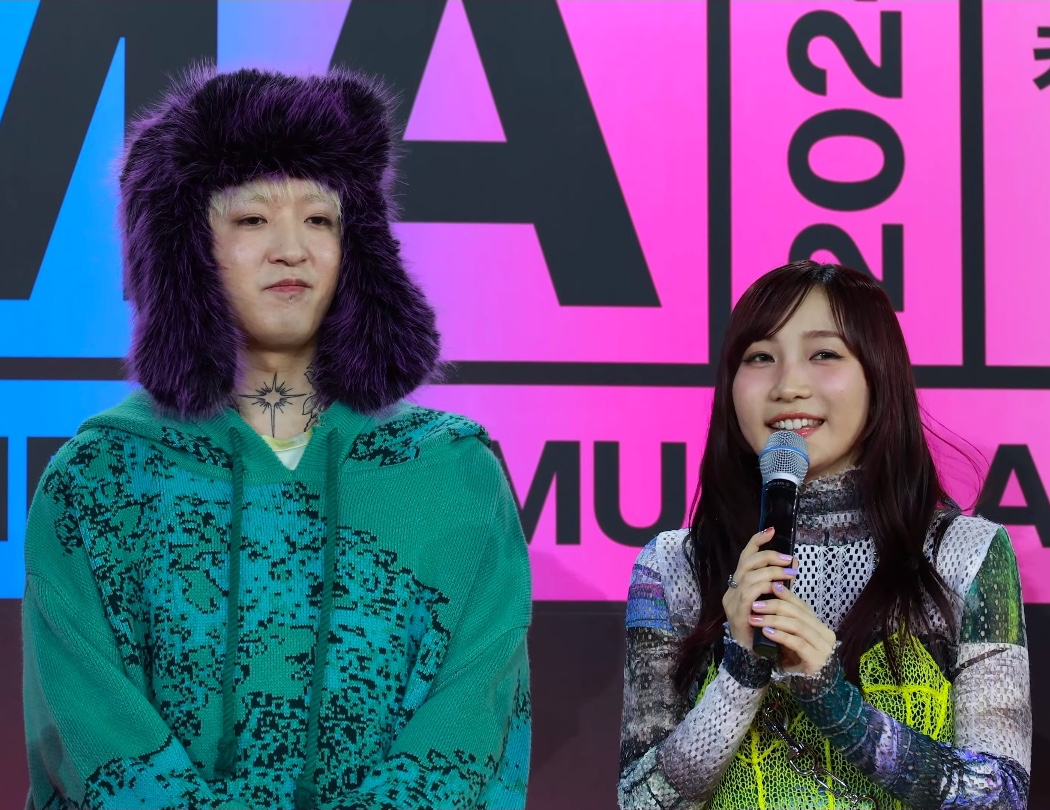
"Idol" by Yoasobi re-peaked at number one in the week of January 17, 2024, expanding the longest number-one song in the chart history to 22 total weeks.

Number-one singles of 2024 on the Japan Hot 100
Issue date	Song	Artist(s)	Ref.
January 1	"Show"	Ado	
January 8	"Show"	Ado	
January 15	"GOAT"	Number_i	
January 22	"Idol"	Yoasobi	
January 29	"Bansanka"	Tuki	
February 5	"Bling-Bang-Bang-Born"	Creepy Nuts	
February 12	"Bling-Bang-Bang-Born"	Creepy Nuts	
February 19	"Bling-Bang-Bang-Born"	Creepy Nuts	
February 26	"Bling-Bang-Bang-Born"	Creepy Nuts	
March 4	"Bling-Bang-Bang-Born"	Creepy Nuts	
March 11	"Bling-Bang-Bang-Born"	Creepy Nuts	
March 18	"Bling-Bang-Bang-Born"	Creepy Nuts	
March 25	"Bling-Bang-Bang-Born"	Creepy Nuts	
April 1	"Bling-Bang-Bang-Born"	Creepy Nuts	
April 8	"Bling-Bang-Bang-Born"	Creepy Nuts	
April 15	"Bling-Bang-Bang-Born"	Creepy Nuts	
April 22	"Bling-Bang-Bang-Born"	Creepy Nuts	
April 29	"Bling-Bang-Bang-Born"	Creepy Nuts	
May 6	"Masterplan"	Be First	
May 13	"Bling-Bang-Bang-Born"	Creepy Nuts	
May 20	"Bling-Bang-Bang-Born"	Creepy Nuts	
May 27	"Bling-Bang-Bang-Born"	Creepy Nuts	
June 3	"Halfmoon"	King & Prince	
June 10	"Love Seeker"	JO1	
June 17	"Bling-Bang-Bang-Born"	Creepy Nuts	
June 24	"Bling-Bang-Bang-Born"	Creepy Nuts	
July 1	"Bling-Bang-Bang-Born"	Creepy Nuts	
July 8	"Loud"	INI	
July 15	"Hush-Hush"	Be First and Ateez	
July 22	"Lilac"	Mrs. Green Apple	
July 29	"Atarashii Koibitotachi ni"	Back Number	
August 5	"24 Karats Gold Genesis"	The Rampage from Exile Tribe	
August 12	"Breakout"	Snow Man	
August 19	"Aoarashi"	&Team	
August 26	"Blissful"	Be First	
September 2	"Inzm"	Number_i	
September 9	"Hi-Five"	Me:I	
September 16	"Lilac"	Mrs. Green Apple	
September 23	"Atarashii Koibitotachi ni"	Back Number	
September 30	"Zettaiteki Dairokkan"	Hinatazaka46	
October 7	"UMP"	Hey! Say! JUMP	
October 14	"Where Do We Go"	JO1	
October 21	"Gotta Be"	Ae! Group	
October 28	"Otonoke"	Creepy Nuts	
November 4	"I Want Tomorrow to Come"	Sakurazaka46	
November 11	"WMDA (Where My Drums At)"	INI	
November 18	"Awa Awa"	Bullet Train	
November 25	"APT."	Rosé and Bruno Mars	
December 2	"APT."	Rosé and Bruno Mars	
December 9	"APT."	Rosé and Bruno Mars	
December 16	"Bitter Vacances"	Mrs. Green Apple	
December 23	"Hodōkyō"	Nogizaka46	
December 30	"APT."	Rosé and Bruno Mars	

== See also ==
- List of Billboard Japan Hot Albums number ones of 2024
