= Asako Hirabayashi =

- Born: 1960 (age 65–66); Japan
- Occupation: Composer

Asako Hirabayashi (born 1960) is a Japanese-American contemporary composer, librettist, and harpsichordist.

== Early life and training ==
Hirabayashi was born in Japan and began composing and playing piano at age 7. She graduated from college in Japan as a composition major. She encountered the harpsichord in Japan, and adopted it as a good fit for her small hands and her desire to play on rare instruments. She moved to the United States in order to study harpsichord performance and composition at the Juilliard School in the 1990s. She earned a doctorate degree from Juilliard writing a dissertation titled, "Ornamentation in the harpsichord music of William Byrd."

== Career ==
In the early 2000s, she moved to Minnesota where she became an active member of the Japan America Society of Minnesota. She performs locally, nationally and internationally, while composing and teaching. Her most recognized compositions include an opera, a Concerto for Four Harpsichords and Strings, and solo harpsichord and chamber pieces.

Hirabayashi's interest in historical instruments led her to collaborate with violinist Margaret Humphrey. They started the duo Cerulean Fire in 2012. Their mission is to provide the highest quality of music as well as increase the general public's awareness and appreciation of concerts with historical instruments. In 2014 Hirabayashi took over producing a "Music and Flower" show with the group Sogetsu Ikebana Group. This show had been started by her friend Eiji Ikeda, a violist of the Minnesota Orchestra.

Performing her own compositions and other works, Asako makes regular appearances at the Baroque Room in Minneapolis. She performed in Japan, Carnegie Hall, London, and several global venues. She regularly collaborates with string players and other performers.

Hirabayashi teaches in her studio at the Saint Paul Conservatory.

== Musical style ==
Hirabayashi's musical style blends distinct melodic lines and traditional rhythms with structures built from the textures of Ligeti and spectralist composers.

Hirabayashi composes music for solo harpsichord and combinations of chamber instruments.

She composed and performed all the works for the CD The Harpsichord in the New Millennium.

== Selected works ==
- The Harpsichord in the New Millennium (2010, Albany Records) – Hirabayashi composed and performed on the twenty-four tracks for harpsichord, violin, and fortepiano. Her aesthetic combines traditional forms, genres (i.e. tango, siciliano), with new timbres to bring about distinctive and engaging works. One piece is "Tango for Harpsichord and Fortepiano."
- Yukionna – (2015) – Hirabayashi wrote and composed the opera Yukionna, based on an ancient Japanese folktale. The libretto was written by Steven Epp of Theatre de la Jeune Lune. It reimagines the tragedy of the Snow Witch Yukionna. The work blends Western opera style with Japanese arias and music.

== Recognition ==
- Multiple McKnight awards
- Minnesota Arts Board grants
- 2004: Solo Category Winner of the Aliénor Harpsichord Composition Competition
- 2008: Honorable Mention for the Duo Category Winner of the Aliénor Harpsichord Composition Competition
- 2010: CD The Harpsichord in the New Millennium was selected as one of the five best classical CDs of the year
- 2018: Gold Medal Award from Global Music Awards 2018.
- 2021: Discovery Grant from Opera America for Hebi-onna (Snake Woman)

== Sources ==
- "Asako Hirabayashi Archives". American Composers Forum.
- Harukaze Concert 2018: Musical and Floral Metamorphosis member of Japan America Society of Minnesota
- "A New Interpretation of the English Virginalists' Ornament Signs". Open Music Library. published scholarly article
