= Candy Go!Go! =

Japanese idol girl group

- Origin: Tokyo, Japan
- Genres: J-pop
- Years active: 2010–2024
- Labels: OnetoOne Agency
- Past members: See former members
- Website: candygogo.jp

Candy Go!Go! was a Japanese idol girl group that formed in 2010 and disbanded in 2024.

== History ==
Candy Go!Go! was formed in July 2010. They made their major label debut with the single, "Kamisama no Ijiwaru", in October 2014. Their second single, "Ari no Mama, Omou Mama ni Hashire!", was released in May 2015. In 2016, they released two singles: "Overdrive / Taisetsu na Oshirase" in January, and "Wanchan Summer / Endroll" in August. Their major label debut album, Idorock, was released in December 2016. In June 2017, their fifth single, "Candy", was released. The EP, Idorock -Beyond-, featuring their fifth and sixth singles: "Candy" and "Fake News", was released in June 2019. Their seventh single, "The Last of Days", was released in December 2019. In 2020 they released two singles: "Infinity" in July, and "Since 2010～" in December. Their tenth single, "Understeer", was released in July 2021. The group's final single, "In The Game / Brave Venus", was released in April 2022. Candy Go!Go! released their final album, Idorock -Legacy-, in November 2023. On April 8, 2024, Candy Go!Go! disbanded after their final concert.

== Members ==
=== Final line-up ===
- Rin Nagisa (なぎさりん)
- Airu Nazuki (菜月アイル)
- Miki Isono (磯野未来)
- Rika Nagase (永瀬りか)
- Sara Natsui (夏井さら)

=== Former members ===
- Shoko Mamiya (間宮照子)
- Tomoka Sakura (佐倉朋香)
- Ayane Izumisawa (泉沢紋音)
- Megumi Sakurai (櫻井めぐみ)
- Natsumi Takahashi (高橋ナツミ)
- Nana Morisaki (森咲なな)
- Yuko Miura (三浦裕子)
- Haruka Enta (円田はるか)
- Momoko Shishido (宍戸桃子)
- Kana Saeki (佐伯かな)
- Yumi Sekine (関根優美)
- Shiori Takajo (高城しおり)
- Ria Sugimoto (杉本莉愛)
- Mizuki Uno (宇野みずき)

== Discography ==
=== Studio albums ===
List of studio albums, with selected details and chart positions
Title	Details	Peak chart positions	
Title	Details	JPN	JPN Hot
Ame Damashī (飴魂)	Released: June 29, 2012; Label: OneToOne Records; Formats: CD, digital download, streaming	—	—
Idorock	Released: December 28, 2016; Label: Imperial Records; Formats: CD, digital download, streaming	31	74
Idorock -Legacy-	Released: November 15, 2023; Label: Vortex Records; Formats: CD, digital download, streaming	—	—

=== Extended plays ===
List of extended plays, with selected details and chart positions
Title	Details	Peak chart positions	
Title	Details	JPN	JPN Hot
Ame Kaiwai (飴界隈)	Released: September 25, 2013; Label: SMG / XLR Entertainment; Formats: CD, digital download, streaming	—	—
Idorock -Beyond-	Released: June 19, 2019; Label: OneToOne Records; Formats: CD, digital download, streaming	29	61

=== Singles ===
List of singles, with selected chart positions, showing year released and album name
Title	Year	Peak chart positions		Album
Title	Year	JPN	JPN Hot	Album
"We Are!!!!!!"	2011	—	—	Ame Damashī
"Koko Da yo! Smile" (ここだよ!スマイル)	2011	—	—	Ame Damashī
"Forever ~Anata no Toko he~" (Forever～あなたのとこへ)	2012	—	—	Non-album single
"Burning"	2012	—	—	Ame Damashī
"Zettai Kasoku Shoujo C" (絶対加速少女C)	2012	—	—	Non-album singles
"Otona no Jijō" (おとなの事情)	2013	—	—	Non-album singles
"Soshite Mata Aeru to Iu yo" (そしてまた逢えると云うよ)	2014	—	—	Non-album singles
"Cinderella Call"	2014	—	—	Non-album singles
"Kamisama no Ijiwaru" (神様のイジ悪)	2014	17	53	Non-album singles
"Ari no Mama, Omou Mama ni Hashire!" (ありのまま、思うままに走れ!)	2015	19	81	Non-album singles
"Overdrive / Taisetsu na Oshirase" (Overdrive/大切なお知らせ)	2016	8	51	Idorock
"Wanchan Summer / Endroll" (ワンチャン☆サマー/Endroll)	2016	25	—	Idorock
"Candy"	2017	28	—	Idorock -Beyond-
"Fake News	2018	—	—	Idorock -Beyond-
"The Last of Days"	2019	27	—	Idorock -Legacy-
"Infinity"	2020	31	—	Idorock -Legacy-
"Since 2010～"	2020	38	—	Idorock -Legacy-
"Understeer"	2021	25	—	Idorock -Legacy-
"In The Game / Brave Venus"	2022	32	—	Idorock -Legacy-
"—" denotes releases that did not chart or were not released in that region.
