= Tebasaki Sensation =

Japanese girl group

Tebasaki Sensation 手羽先センセーション
- Origin: Nagoya
- Genres: J-pop
- Labels: Kong Records
- Members: Hina "Nabiten" Morita; Mirei "Mirei" Kamiya; Manaka "Maachan" Saitō; Koharu "Koharun" Hashimoto; Nayu "Tsukanon" Tsukano; Shiho "Mīke" Miike
- Website: www.tebasen.com

Tebasaki Sensation (手羽先センセーション, Tebasaki Sensēshon) is a Japanese idol group, who have one charted single in Oricon.

== History ==
Their debut album Tebasaki no Oishī Tabekata reached #1 on Oricon Album Daily Ranking. They mobilized a record 1,004 people at their one-man live in Zepp Nagoya two years after the debut.

== Members ==
- Hina "Nabiten" Morita (森田陽菜, Morita Hina; born 3 October, from Aichi Prefecture)
- Mirei "Mirei" Kamiya (神谷美玲, Kamiya Mirei; born 11 May, from Shizuoka Prefecture)
- Manaka "Maachan" Saitō (斉藤まなか, Saitō Manaka; born 25 July, from Osaka Prefecture)
- Koharu "Koharun" Hashimoto (橋本琴春, Hashimoto Koharu; born 23 May, from AIchi Prefecture)
- Nayu "Tsukanon" Tsukano (塚野なゆ, Tsukanon Nayu; born 3 November, from Aichi Prefecture)
- Shiho "Mīke" Miike (三池志歩, Miike Shiho; born 28 March, from Aichi Prefecture)

== Discography ==
=== Studio albums ===
Title	Album details	Peak chart positions		Sales
Title	Album details	JPN	JPN Hot	Sales
Tebasaki no Oishī Tabekata	Released: 9 April 2019; Label: Kong Records; Formats: CD	11	—	
Yukusaki, Tebasaki	Released: 8 April 2020; Label: Dreamusic; Formats: CD	7	—	JPN: 6,822
Tebasaki Sensation	Released: 9 March 2022; Label: Dreamusic; Formats: CD	11	11	JPN: 3,966
Hello New World	Released: 8 March 2023; Label: Dreamusic; Formats: CD	6	7	JPN: 10,723
"—" denotes releases that did not chart or were not released in that region.

=== Extended plays ===
Title	EP details	Peak chart positions	Sales
Title	EP details	JPN	Sales
Rebirth	Released: 20 January 2026; Label: Rockfield; Formats: CD	12	JPN: 8,656
