= Chiai Fujikawa =

Japanese singer (born 1995)

- Born: 6 June 1995 (age 31); Okayama Prefecture, Japan
- Genres: J-pop; pop rock
- Occupations: Singer; musician; lyricist
- Years active: 2015–present
- Website: fujikawachiai.com

Chiai Fujikawa (Japanese: 藤川千愛, Hepburn: Fujikawa Chiai; born 6 June 1995) is a Japanese singer.

== Life and career ==
Chiai Fujikawa was born on 6 June 1995 in Ibara, Okayama Prefecture. At the age of three years she was inspired by her grandfather, who was an Enka musician, to become a musician. After graduating from high school she worked in a factory until 2015 when she won a vocal audition to become a member of Idol music group Maneki Kecak. Along with the group she released six singles, a live DVD and a studio album which entered the Japanese music charts. She left Maneki Kecak in September 2018 to focus on her solo music career. Chiai Fujikawa had a guest role in the first episode of the Japanese TV series Kizoku Tantei.

She released three singles Katte ni Hitori de Dokidoki Sunna yo, Yume Nankaja Meshi wa Kuenai to Dareka no Sei ni Shite and Kimi no Namae in 2018. The latter was used as the outro song for the first 12 episodes of The Rising of the Shield Hero anime. Her fourth single Atashi ga Tonari ni Iru Uchi ni was used as second outro theme in the same series. Her solo debut album Raika was released on 7 May 2019 and peaked at no. 10 at the Japanese albums charts. She is featured on a cover of Buck-Tick's "Keijijō Ryūsei" by minus(-) for the 2020 tribute album Parade III ~Respective Tracks of Buck-Tick~.

Her second album Ai wa Headphones kara was released on 8 April 2020 and features the track Kuyashisa wa Tane which is used as ending theme for the 2020 Digimon Adventure reboot. On 3 September 2020 Fujikawa announced the release of her third studio album called HiKiKoMoRi for 24 November of the same year. During a concert held on 22 August 2021 at Shibuya O-East Fujikawa announced that she was starting a new musical project named PhatSlimNevaeh as well as performing under the pseudonym Roku in the future.

== Discography ==
=== Maneki Kecak ===
- 2015: Kokohaku no Susume/Ai Kotoba (Single)
- 2015: Jōdan ja Nai ne/Monster to Kecak (Single)
- 2016: Kimi Wazurai/Mōsō Sakura (Single)
- 2016: Time Machine/SPLASH! (Single)
- 2017: Dōdemo Iiya/Arikitari na Kotoba de (Single)
- 2018: Kagami no Naka kara/Atashi no Nokori Zenbu Ageru (Single)
- 2018: Kimi Wazurai (Album, Nippon Columbia)

=== Solo ===
as Chiai Fujikawa

- 2018: Katte ni Hitori de Dokidoki Sunna yo (Single)
- 2018: Yume Nankaja Meshi wa Kuenai to Dareka no Sei ni Shite (Single)
- 2018: Kimi no Namae (Single)
- 2019: Atashi ga Tonari ni Iru Uchi ni (Single)
- 2019: Raika (Album, Nippon Columbia)
- 2020: Ai wa Headphones kara (Album, Nippon Columbia)
- 2020: HiKiKoMoRi (Album, Nippon Columbia)
- 2020: Bakemono to Yobare (Single)
- 2022: Tashikana kototte (Single)
- 2022: Chantoshitahito Futekigousha (Single)
- 2023: Nanimo Wasureru Wakejanai (Single)
- 2023: Naino Zouga Guchiwo Kobosumonode (Album, Nippon Columbia)

== Accolades ==
- 2020: Anime Trending Awards for Best Ending Theme (Kimi no namae, nominated)
