= List of Billboard Japan Hot Albums number ones of 2024 =

The following is a list of weekly number-one albums on the Billboard Japan Hot Albums chart in 2024.

== Chart history ==
Number-one albums of 2024 on the Billboard Japan Hot Albums
Issue date	Album	Artist(s)	Ref.
January 1	Road to A	Travis Japan	
January 8	Yellow Note	Jin Akanishi	
January 15	Ado's Utattemita Album	Ado	
January 22	The Vibes	SixTones	
January 29	Kitto, Zettai, Zettai	≒Joy	
February 5	Tokimeku Koi to Seishun	Chō Tokimeki Sendenbu	
February 12	Photogenic	The Jet Boy Bangerz from Exile Tribe	
February 19	Seventeenth Heaven	Seventeen	
February 26	Match Up	INI	
March 4	Reboot (JP Special Selection)	Treasure	
March 11	Reboot	Treasure	
March 18	Seventeenth Heaven	Seventeen	
March 25	Award	West	
April 1	Peppermint Yum	Fantastics from Exile Tribe and Epex	
April 8	Land of Promise	Sandaime J Soul Brothers	
April 15	Minisode 3: Tomorrow	Tomorrow X Together	
April 22	Science Fiction	Hikaru Utada	
April 29	How?	BoyNextDoor	
May 6	Science Fiction	Hikaru Utada	
May 13	17 Is Right Here	Seventeen	
May 20	Synopsis	Kis-My-Ft2	
May 27	TM Network Tribute Album: 40th Celebration	Various artists	
June 3	Ensemble Stars!! Album Series "Trip" Knights	Knights	
June 10	No. O: Ring	Number_i	
June 17	Golden Hour: Part.1	Ateez	
June 24	+Alpha	Naniwa Danshi	
July 1	Timelesz	Timelesz	
July 8	Tadamono	Koshi Inaba	
July 15	Riizing	Riize	
July 22	Zanmu	Ado	
July 29	Romance: Untold	Enhypen	
August 5	Rise Up	NiziU	
August 12	Super Eight	Super Eight	
August 19	JapaNEWS	NEWS	
August 26	See You There	Takuya Kimura	
September 2	Lost Corner	Kenshi Yonezu	
September 9	2:Be	Be First	
September 16	Iris	Bump of Chicken	
September 23	19.99	BoyNextDoor	
September 30	Utopiia	Buddiis	
October 7	No. I	Number_i	
October 14	Fiesta	One n' Only	
October 21	Back to the Pops	Glay	
October 28	Spill the Feels	Seventeen	
November 4	Precious Days	Mariya Takeuchi	
November 11	Rays	Snow Man	
November 18	The Star Chapter: Sanctuary	Tomorrow X Together	
November 25	Giant	Stray Kids	
December 2	Romance: Untold -Daydream-	Enhypen	
December 9	H+	Hey! Say! JUMP	
December 16	Viisual	Travis Japan	
December 23	Re: Era	King & Prince	
December 30	Yukiakari	&Team	

== See also ==
- List of Hot 100 number-one singles of 2024 (Japan)
