= Stardust Revue =

Japanese band

- Origin: Saitama, Japan
- Genres: Adult contemporary, folk, fusion, pop, rock, soul
- Years active: 1979–present
- Labels: Warner Music Japan (1981–1993); One Up Music (1994–2000); Ohmagatoki (2001–2005); Imperial Records (2006–)
- Members: Kaname Nemoto; Kiyoshi Kakinuma; Masami Terada; Toshikatsu "VOH" Hayashi
- Past members: Yasuhiro Mitani; Ken'ichi Mitsuda
- Website: www.s-d-r.jp

Stardust Revue (スターダストレビュー, Sutādasuto Rebyū), often called as Sutarebi (スタ★レビ) or abbreviated to SDR, is a Japanese popular musical band formed in the late 1970s.

== Members ==
=== Current members ===
==== Regular members ====
- Kaname Nemoto (根本要, Nemoto Kaname; b. May 23, 1957); lead vocalist, guitarlist and MC talking
- Kiyoshi Kakinuma (柿沼清史, Kakinuma Kiyoshi; b. November 11, 1957); vocalist and bassist
- Masami Terada (寺田正美, Terada Masami; b. July 26, 1959); vocalist and drummer
- Toshikatsu "VOH" Hayashi (林"VOH"紀勝, Hayashi "VOH" Toshikatsu; b. January 28, 1960); vocalist and percussionist

==== Supporting members ====
- Keiji Soeda (添田啓二, Soeda Keiji; b. July 26, 1966); vocalist and keyboardist
- Masayuki Okazaki (岡崎昌幸, Okazaki Masayuki; b. December 15, 1968); vocalist, guitarlist and keyboardist

== Former members ==
- Yasuhiro Mitani (三谷泰弘, Mitani Yasuhiro; b. December 13, 1959); vocalist and keyboardist (1980–1994)
- Ken'ichi Mitsuda (光田健一, Mitsuda Ken'ichi; b. February 15, 1967); vocalist and keyboardist (1998–2001)

== History ==
The four amateur musicians Kaname Nemoto, Kiyoshi Kakinuma, Masami Terada and Toshikatsu "VOH" Hayashi, from Saitama Prefecture, first formed a band called Gypsy and Arere-no-re (ジプシーとアレレのレ, Jipusī to Arere no Re) in 1979, to participate in the Yamaha Popular Song Contest, where they won the Best Song Award with the song Ora ga Chinju no Muramatsuri (おらが鎮守の村祭り). In 1981, they renamed the group as Stardust Revue (スターダストレビュー, Sutādasuto Rebyū), because they desire to show various musical characteristics represented by the jazz standard song "Stardust" and ones of themselves in Revue-style performance. Their earliest recordings were STARDUST REVUE (the first album) and Shugā wa Otoshigoro (シュガーはお年頃) (the first single), both released on May 25, 1981.

On its 20th anniversary year, 2001, they toured all over Japan to hold concerts as usual, and then, on August 4, they performed no less than 101 songs at a concert at the Tsumagoi Multipurpose Arena in Shizuoka, Japan. This performance has been recognized by the Guinness World Records as "the highest number of songs performed in 24 hours by a group."

== Discography ==
- Within brackets are release dates.

=== Singles ===
1. Shugā wa Otoshigoro (シュガーはお年頃) (1981.5.25)
2. Ginza Neon Paradise (銀座ネオン・パラダイス) (1981.11.28)
3. Black Pepper no Tappuri Kiita Watashi no Tsukutta Onion Slice (ブラックペッパーのたっぷりきいた私の作ったオニオンスライス) (1982.5.25)
4. Twilight Avenue (トワイライト・アヴェニュー) (1983.10.26)
5. Yume Densetu (夢伝説) (1984.5.25)
6. Omoide ni Kawaru made (想い出にかわるまで) (1985.1.25)
7. Single Night (1985.9.25)
8. Rokugatsu no Jingle Bell (6月のジングル・ベル) (1986.3.25)
9. Kon'ya dake Kitto (今夜だけきっと) (1986.6.25)
10. Mouichido Harbor Light (もう一度ハーバーライト) (1986.10.25)
11. Kokoro no Naka no Follow Wind (心の中のFollow Wind) (1987.2.25)
12. One More Time (1987.6.10)
13. Mebius no Hitomi (メビウスの瞳) (1987.10.25)
14. Mebius no Hitomi (メビウスの瞳) / One More Time (1988.4.25)
15. Yume Densetu (夢伝説) / Omoide ni Kawaru made (想い出にかわるまで) (1988.4.25)
16. Kon'ya dake Kitto (今夜だけきっと) / Mouichido Harbor Light (もう一度ハーバーライト) (1988.4.25)
17. Stay My Blue – Kimi ga Koishikute - (Stay My Blue – 君が恋しくて -) (1988.6.25)
18. Northern Lights – Kagayaku Kimi ni - (Northern Lights – 輝く君に -) (1989.2.25)
19. Natsu no Silhouette (夏のシルエット) (1989.5.25)
20. Be My Lady (1989.7.25)
21. Lonely Snow Bird (1989.10.25)
22. Kimi no Quatre-vingt-dix (君のキャトル・ヴァン・ディス) (1990.2.10)
23. Kimi no Subete ga Koishii (君のすべてが悲しい) (1990.9.25)
24. Koshakuna Lady (こしゃくなレディ) (1991.7.10)
25. Hitomi no Naka no Tengoku (瞳の中の天国) (1991.10.10)
26. Tsuioku (追憶) (1992.1.25)
27. Mouichido Dakishimete (もう一度抱きしめて) (1993.2.10)
28. Mokuren no Namida (木蘭の涙) (1993.7.25)
29. Crazy Love (クレイジー・ラブ) (1994.4.25)
30. Futari (ふたり) (1995.5.10)
31. Aenaiyo (会えないよ) (1995.10.25)
32. Get Up My Soul (1996.4.25)
33. Mou Chotto dake Nanka Tarinai (もうチョットだけ何か足りない) (1996.10.25)
34. Aishiteru no Tsuzuki (愛してるの続き) (1997.6.25)
35. Nani Yattendarou (何やってんだろう) (1997.10.15)
36. Shichigatsu Nanoka (7月7日) (1998.5.21)
37. Wine Koi Monogatari (ワイン恋物語) (1998.10.21)
38. Doushite (どうして) (1999.8.21)
39. Kon'ya dake Kitto (今夜だけきっと) / Natural – Dakishimete Konomama de - (ナチュラル〜抱きしめてこのままで〜) (2000.5.17)
40. What is Love? (2000.11.29)
41. My Love (2001.11.21)
42. Joanna (2002.11.20)
43. My pride, your pride/Step by step (2003.3.26)
44. Deera Shiera Mu (デェラ・シエラ・ム) with Chage and Aska (2003.9.10)
45. Honjitsu no Soup (本日のスープ) with Yo Oizumi (2004.1.28 Hokkaido-limited edition, 2004.3.31 Nationwide edition)
46. Find My Way (2004.7.28)
47. Minamikaze Fuku Oka de (南風吹く丘で) (2004.10.27)
48. Mokuren no Namida – acoustic - (木蘭の涙〜acoustic〜) (2005.5.25)
49. Inochi no Kotae (いのちのこたえ) (2006.1.25)
50. Wake Up! My Heart (2007.3.21)
51. Ai no Uta (愛の歌) (2007.7.25)
52. Yume Densetsu (夢伝説) (2008.8.27)
53. Shiosai Seiya (潮騒静夜) (2009.11.18)
54. Yume eno Chizu (夢への地図) (2010.7.21)
55. Magic -Te wo Tsunagou- (Magic 〜手をつなごう〜) (2012.2.22)

=== Albums ===
==== Original albums ====
1. STARDUST REVUE (1981.5.25)
2. Koyoi ha Modern Boy (今宵はモダン・ボーイ) (1982.6.25)
3. TO YOU -Yume Densetsu- (TO YOU －夢伝説－) (1984.7.25)
4. THANK YOU (1985.3.25)
5. VOICE (1986.4.10)
6. CHARMING (1986.12.10)
7. NIGHT SONGS (1987.6.25)
8. SUPER DONUTS (1987.11.28)
9. RENDEZ-VOUS (1988.7.25)
10. In The Sun, In The Shade (1989.7.10)
11. ONE & MILLIONS (1990.10.3)
12. Brightest! (1991.11.6)
13. SOLA (1993.3.10)
14. Gakudan (楽団) (1994.5.25)
15. Tsuya (艶) (1995.6.26)
16. Ladies & Gentlemen (1996.7.8)
17. Goodtimes & Badtimes (1997.11.5)
18. Moody Blues (1998.11.5)
19. DEVOTION (1999.11.20)
20. Style (2002.1.1)
21. Heaven (2003.4.23)
22. AQUA (2004.9.29)
23. 31 (2007.9.5)
24. ALWAYS (2008.11.19)
25. Taiyou no Megumi (太陽のめぐみ) (2009.9.16)

==== Best albums ====
- Best Wishes (1990.5.25)
- LOVE SONGS (1994.11.30)
- STARS (2000.3.15)
- LOVE SONGS (2002.4.24)
- LOVE SONGS II (2002.4.24)
- Best Wishes (2002.5.22)
- HOT MENU (2006.3.1) – Certified as Gold award by RIAJ
- BLUE STARDUST (2009.5.27)
- RED STARDUST (2009.6.24)
- BLUE & RED STARDUST (2011.2.23)

==== Live recordings ====
- FACE TO FACE (1992.10.25)
- SECRET FACE (1992.11.28)
- No Ballads (2001.7.25)
- FACE TO FACE (2002.5.22)
- SECRET FACE (2002.5.22)
