= TUYU =

Japanese music group formed in 2019

TUYU ツユ
- Genre: J-pop
- Years active: 2019–2024

YouTube information
- Channel: ツユ
- Years active: 2009-2024
- Subscribers: 1.36 million
- Views: 491.46 million
- Last updated: 18 March 2026

TUYU (Japanese: ツユ) were a Japanese music group formed in 2019. The group ceased activities after the arrest of member Pusu in 2024.

== History ==
On 12 June 2019, TUYU released their first song titled "It's Raining After All" (やっぱり雨は降るんだね, Yappari Ame wa furunda ne).

In 2020, TUYU released their first album It's Raining After All. TUYU released their second album I'll Put You in Misery in July 2021.

In 2023, their song "It Might Be Painful, but I Still Love It" (傷つけど、愛してる, Kizutsukedo, aishiteru) was used as the ending theme for the second season of the anime adaptation of Tokyo Revengers. TUYU released their third album Under Mentality in June. Later in November, the group went on hiatus based on Pusu's decision. In the statement the group said "If there is no further activity, please assume that we have broken up". It was later announced during the Zepp Haneda concert in February 2024 that the group would not be breaking up.

On 31 May 2024, Pusu, guitarist and songwriter for TUYU, was arrested on suspicion of attempted murder. TUYU later made a statement, apologising for the incident, as well as announcing the cancellation of two planned performances in Shinagawa and Yokohama, and the release of miro's piano CD "TUYU Piano Collection". The group also announced the following day after the previous statement on Twitter that it was ceasing activities as TUYU. Following the incident, songs by the group as well as songs made by Pusu under the name ZIPS were removed from various games, including Beatmania IIDX, Chunithm, GITADORA GALAXY WAVE, Hatsune Miku: Colorful Stage!, Initial D THE ARCADE, jubeat beyond the Ave., Maimai, Ongeki, Pop'n Music , and SOUND VOLTEX EXCEED GEAR.

In October, Pusu made a statement, apologising for the incident. He also said that he would continue music as a hobby. TUYU later announced in November that they would delete all of their songs which Pusu wrote the lyrics or music for. The decision was later reversed after an online poll held by the group on 31 December was against the deletion of the songs.

== Members ==
- Rei (礼衣) – vocalist (2019–2024)
- Pusu (ぷす) – guitarist, songwriter (2019–2024)
- Miro – piano (2019–2024)

== Discography ==
=== Studio albums ===
Title	Album details	Peak chart positions
Title	Album details	JPN Oricon
It's Raining After All (やっぱり雨は降るんだね)	Release date: 19 Feb 2020; Track listing: 1. "It's Raining After All" (やっぱり雨は降るんだね); 2. "Early summer" (夏浅し); 3. "Under the Summer Breeze" (風薫る空の下); 4. "When the Morning Glory Falls" (アサガオの散る頃に); 5. "Loneliness and the Future" (ひとりぼっちと未来); 6. "I'm getting on the bus to the other world, see ya!" (あの世行きのバスに乗ってさらば。); 7. "Perhaps I'll be able to become the Sun." (太陽になれるかな); 8. "Envy" (羨望); 9. "Compared Child" (くらべられっ子); 10. "Goodbye to Rock you" (ロックな君とはお別れだ); 11. "Even tears withered" (ナミカレ)	16
I'll Put You in Misery (貴方を不幸に誘いますね)	Release date: 12 June 2021; Track listing: 1. "Greed" (強欲); 2. "Dämonisch" (デモーニッシュ); 3. "Trapped in the past" (過去に囚われている); 4. "What if this isn't a slave?" (奴隷じゃないなら何ですか？); 5. "Loser Girl" (ルーザーガール); 6. "Bathing in the rain" (雨を浴びる); 7. "Autumn rain front" (秋雨前線); 8. "Faithful dog "Hachi"" (忠犬ハチ); 9. "Territory Battle" (テリトリーバトル); 10. "Hide and Seek Alone" (かくれんぼっち); 11. "Being low as dirt, taking what's important from me" (泥の分際で私だけの大切を奪おうだなんて); 12. "If there was an Endpoint." (終点の先が在るとするならば。)	10
Under Mentality (アンダーメンタリティ)	Release date: 21 June 2023; Track listing: 1. "Under Mentality -instrumental-" 2. "The Dissatisfaction and Discontent Disease -monologue-" (不平不満の病 -monologue-); 3. "Under Kids" (アンダーキッズ); 4. "The Ravings of a Scheming Woman" (腹黒女の戯言 -monologue-); 5. "Under Heroine" (アンダーヒロイン); 6. "Would be nice if you grow up one day." (いつかオトナになれるといいね。); 7. "Shelter From the Rain -instrumental-" (雨宿り -instrumental-); 8. "Overcast skies" (雨模様); 9. "Rainfall" (レインフォール); 10. "And That’s Why I Can't Stop!" (これだからやめらんない！); 11. "It Might Be Painful, but I Still Love It." (傷つけど、愛してる); 12. "The Tale of a Moonlight Night" (朧月夜物語)	12

=== Singles ===
Title	Year	Album
"It's Raining After All"	2019	It's Raining After All
"Under the Summer Breeze"	2019	It's Raining After All
"When the Morning Glory Falls"	2019	It's Raining After All
"Compared Child"	2019	It's Raining After All
"I’m getting on the bus to the other world, see ya!"	2019	It's Raining After All
"Goodbye to Rock you"	2019	It's Raining After All
"Compared Child (Remix)"	2020	Non-album single
"Bathing in the rain"	2020	I'll Put You in Misery
"Being as low as dirt, taking what’s important from me"	2020	I'll Put You in Misery
"Trapped in the past"	2020	I'll Put You in Misery
"Loser Girl"	2020	I'll Put You in Misery
"Hide and Seek Alone"	2021	I'll Put You in Misery
"Dämonisch"	2021	I'll Put You in Misery
"Would be nice if you grew up one day"	2022	Under Mentality
"Under Kids"	2022	Under Mentality
"Overcast skies"	2022	Under Mentality
"What Sort of Ending Are You Wishing For?"	2022	Non-album single
"It Might Be Painful, but I Still Love It"	2023	Under Mentality
"And That’s Why I Can’t Stop!"	2023	Under Mentality
"Under Heroine"	2023	Under Mentality
"Revolutionary front"	2023	Non-album single
"It’s Raining Nevertheless"	2024	Non-album single

== Live performances ==
=== Concert tours ===
- TUYU LIVE TOUR 2022
- TUYU LIVE TOUR 2023 UNDER MENTALITY
- TUYU LIVE TOUR 2024 革命前線

=== Solo performances ===
- It's Raining After All (2020)
- And Yet it's Still Raining (2021)
- I'll Put You in Misery (2021)
- If there was an Endpoint (2021)
- TUYU 3rd Anniversary Live "Overcast skies" (2022)
