= Ryutist =

Japanese idol girl group

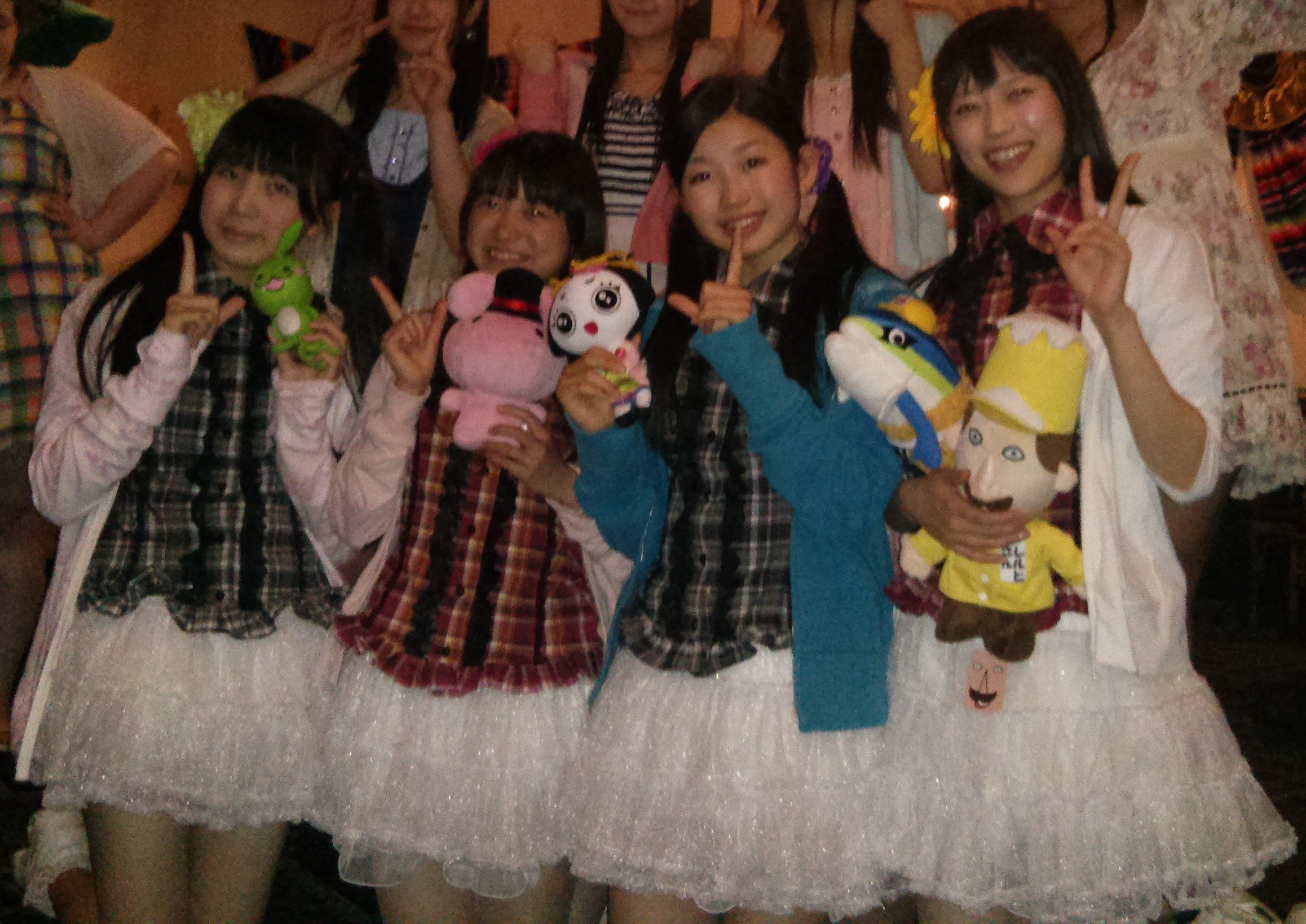
- RYUTist at Idol Matsuri 2014

Background information
- Origin: Japan
- Genres: J-pop
- Years active: 2011–2024
- Labels: Ryuto Records; Penguin Disc
- Members: Muu Ikarashi; Tomoe Uno; Satō Nonoko
- Past members: Yūri Kimura; Miku Yokoyama; Wakana Ōishi
- Website: ryutist.jp

Ryutist is a Japanese idol girl group formed in 2011. They made their major label debut in 2017 with their second studio album, Ryuto Geigi.

== Members ==
=== Current ===
- Muu Ikarashi (五十嵐夢羽)
- Tomoe Uno (宇野友恵)
- Miku Yokoyama (横山実郁)

=== Former ===
- Yūri Kimura (木村優里)
- Wakana Ōishi (大石若奈)
- Satō Nonoko (佐藤乃々子)

== Discography ==
=== Studio albums ===
Title	Album details	Peak chart positions	
Title	Album details	JPN	
Title	Album details	Oricon	Hot
Nihonkai Yūhi Line (日本海夕日ライン)	Released: August 2, 2016; Label: Ryuto Records; Formats: CD, digital download	162	—
Ryuto Geigi (柳都芸妓)	Released: August 1, 2017; Label: Penguin Disc; Formats: CD, digital download	152	—
Falsetto (ファルセット)	Released: July 14, 2020; Label: Penguin Disc; Formats: CD, digital download	27	31

=== Live albums ===
Title	Album details	Peak chart positions	
Title	Album details	JPN	
Title	Album details	Oricon	Hot
Ryutist Home Live	Released: August 14, 2015; Label: Ryuto Records; Formats: CD, digital download	115	—

=== Singles ===
Title	Year	Peak chart positions	Album
Title	Year	Oricon	Album
"Ryutist! ~Atarashī Home~" (Ryutist ! ～新しいHome～)	2012	—	Non-album singles
"Beat Goes On! ~Yakusoku no Basho~" (Beat Goes On! ～約束の場所～)	2013	—	Non-album singles
"Wind Chime! ~Machi no Tunnel~" (Wind Chime! ～街のトンネル～)	2014	138	Non-album singles
"Winter Merry Go Round"	2015	135	Non-album singles
"Aozora Signal" (青空シグナル)	2018	59	Falsetto
"Tasogare no Diary" (黄昏のダイアリー)	2018	65	Falsetto
"Sensitive Sign" (センシティブサイン)	2019	46	Falsetto
"Kitto, Hajimari no Kisetsu" (きっと、はじまりの季節)	2019	43	Falsetto
