= Kamiyado =

Japanese idol girl group

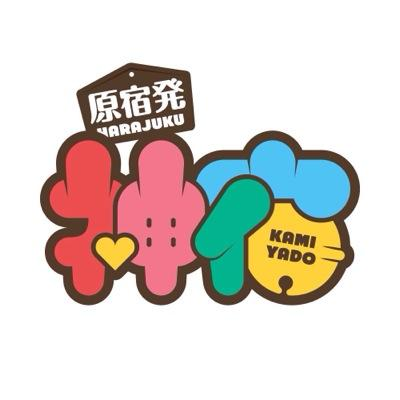
- Kamiyado's logo

Background information
- Origin: Harajuku, Japan
- Genres: J-pop
- Years active: 2014–2024
- Label: Kamiyado
- Past members: Naho Sekiguchi; Mika Ichinose; Mei Hashima; Miki Hashima; Hina Koyama; Kira Shiomi
- Website: kamiyado.jp

Kamiyado (神宿; stylized in all capitals) was a Japanese idol girl group that formed in 2014 and disbanded in 2024.

== History ==
Kamiyado was formed in Harajuku in September 2014. The initial line-up consisted of five members: Mika Ichinose, Mei Hashima, Miki Hashima, Naho Sekiguchi and Hina Koyama.

Naho Sekiguchi graduated from the group on January 13, 2019. Kira Shiomi joined the group on April 29, 2019. Mika Ichinose withdrew from the group on November 24, 2021.

Kamiyado disbanded on August 19, 2024.

== Former members ==
- Mika Ichinose (一ノ瀬みか)
- Mei Hashima (羽島めい)
- Miki Hashima (羽島みき)
- Naho Sekiguchi (関口なほ)
- Hina Koyama (小山ひな)
- Kira Shiomi (塩見きら)

== Discography ==
=== Studio albums ===
List of studio albums, with selected details
Title	Details
Harajuku Hatsu! Kamiyado Desu. (原宿発! 神宿です。)	Released: December 27, 2015; Re-released: November 14, 2017; Label: Kamiyado; Formats: CD, digital download, streaming
Harajuku Chaku! Kamiyado Desu. (原宿着! 神宿です。)	Released: November 14, 2017; Label: Kamiyado; Formats: CD, digital download, streaming
The Life of Idol	Released: October 21, 2020; Label: Kamiyado; Formats: CD, digital download, streaming
The Life of Girls	Released: August 25, 2021; Label: MTRX Entertainment; Formats: CD, digital download, streaming
Rainbow (8colors)	Released: March 8, 2023; Label: MTRX Entertainment; Formats: CD, digital download, streaming

=== Compilation albums ===
List of compilation albums, with selected details and chart positions
Title	Details	Peak chart positions	
Title	Details	JPN	JPN Hot
Kamiyado Complete Best 2014-2015	Released: January 15, 2020; Label: Nippon Crown; Formats: CD, digital download, streaming	—	66
Kamiyado Complete Best 2016-2017	Released: January 15, 2020; Label: Nippon Crown; Formats: CD, digital download, streaming	—	67
Kamiyado Complete Best 2018-2019	Released: January 15, 2020; Label: Nippon Crown; Formats: CD, digital download, streaming	19	29

=== Live albums ===
List of live albums, with selected details
Title	Details
Kamiyado Live Album "Over the Rainbow" (神宿 Live Album "Over the Rainbow")	Released: December 21, 2022; Label: Kamiyado; Formats: CD, digital download, streaming

=== Singles ===
List of singles, with selected chart positions, showing year released and album name
Title	Year	Peak chart positions	Album
Title	Year	JPN	Album
"Harajuku Sentai! Kamiyado Ranger / Genkai Toppa Philosophy" (原宿戦隊!神宿レンジャー/限界突破フィロソフィ)	2016	18	Harajuku Chaku! Kamiyado Desu. and Kamiyado Complete Best 2016-2017
"Kamchatka Adventure" (カムチャッカ・アドベンチャー)	2016	41	Harajuku Chaku! Kamiyado Desu. and Kamiyado Complete Best 2016-2017
"Happy Party Night"	2018	35	Kamiyado Complete Best 2018-2019
"Naizō Saikō" (ないぞう サイコー)	2018	—	Kamiyado Complete Best 2018-2019
"Ohikaenasette Kamiyado de Gozaru" (お控えなすって神宿でござる)	2018	—	Kamiyado Complete Best 2018-2019
"Conversation Fancy"	2019	50	Kamiyado Complete Best 2018-2019
"Grizzly ni Osowaretara" (グリズリーに襲われたら♡)	2019	—	Kamiyado Complete Best 2018-2019
"Shunpu Ambitious" (春風Ambitious)	2019	—	Kamiyado Complete Best 2018-2019
"Zenshin Zenrei Rhapsody" (全身全霊ラプソディ)	2019	—	Kamiyado Complete Best 2018-2019
"Sore Kara" (それから)	2019	—	Kamiyado Complete Best 2018-2019
"Boku wa Platinum" (ボクハプラチナ)	2019	—	Kamiyado Complete Best 2018-2019
"Aru Mono Shirazu " (在ルモノシラズ)	2020	—	The Life of Idol and The Life of Girls
"Erasor"	2020	—	The Life of Idol and The Life of Girls
"Sisters"	2020	—	The Life of Idol and The Life of Girls
"Brush!!"	2020	—	The Life of Idol and The Life of Girls
"Intro:Attitude"	2020	—	The Life of Idol and The Life of Girls
"Twenty"	2020	—	The Life of Girls
"Tokimeki Chū" (トキメキ☆チュウ)	2020	—	The Life of Girls
"Fantastic Girl"	2021	—	The Life of Girls
"O Ai Ni" (を愛に)	2021	—	The Life of Girls
"Caramel Sweet"	2021	—	The Life of Girls
"Lion"	2021	—	Non-album single
"Mae ni Susumu Uta" (#前に進む唄)	2022	11	Rainbow (8colors)
"Kimiiro Soda" (キミイロソーダ)	2022	—	Rainbow (8colors)
"New World!!"	2022	—	Rainbow (8colors)
"Atashi de Gomen ne." (あたしでごめんね。)	2022	—	Rainbow (8colors)
"—" denotes releases that did not chart or were not released in that region.
