= Nobara Kugisaki =

Fictional character from Jujutsu Kaisen

- Jujutsu Kaisen character
- Nobara Kugisaki as drawn by Gege Akutami
- First appearance: Jujutsu Kaisen #3, "For Myself" (2018)
- Created by: Gege Akutami
- Voiced by: Japanese: Asami Seto; English: Anne Yatco

In-universe information
- Occupation: Student at Tokyo Jujutsu High
- Nationality: Japanese

Nobara Kugisaki (Japanese: 釘崎 野薔薇, Hepburn: Kugisaki Nobara) is a fictional character in the manga series Jujutsu Kaisen created by Gege Akutami. A first-year student at Tokyo Jujutsu High, an academy to hone Cursed Techniques to fight against Cursed Spirits arising from negative emotions from humans, she is under the tutelage of Satoru Gojo alongside Yuji Itadori and Megumi Fushiguro. She is a transfer student from Morioka whose hotheadedness and brashness contrast with the other first-year students' altruism and stoicism.

In the Jujutsu Kaisen anime adaptation, Nobara is voiced by Asami Seto in Japanese and Anne Yatco in English. Her character has been widely praised by critics alongside other female characters in the series for being more layered and true to herself than other female shōnen characters.

== Concept and creation ==
Nobara Kugisaki's name was meant by creator Gege Akutami to be "thorny", with the kanji characters for no (野) and bara (薔薇) meaning "wild" and "rose", respectively, while the character used to denote kugi (釘) in her last name means "nail" or "peg", in order to demonstrate the two sides of her personality being rebellious and refined. He came up with her name at the same time as he came up with her powers and abilities, as they come hand-in-hand with each other. Akutami found her dialogue to be the easiest to write of the three main characters, but struggled with her composure in action scenes. Akutami felt it was interesting to give her the sharp desire to go to Tokyo, contrasting against her grandmother's wish for her to be raised normally in her small hometown.

Nobara was designed to be more true to herself than the other two protagonists; her authenticity is on full display at multiple points in the series, including during the Kyoto Goodwill Exchange event, where she declares that she will only ever be herself and refuses to try to follow expectations from others. According to Akutami, she is best described by the songs "Seishun Kyosokyoku" by Sunny Day Service and "Ano Depaato" by Natsuko Nisshoku, which contrast rock with heartfelt vocals and plucky piano playing to show her country upbringing and creativity.

=== Voice actresses ===
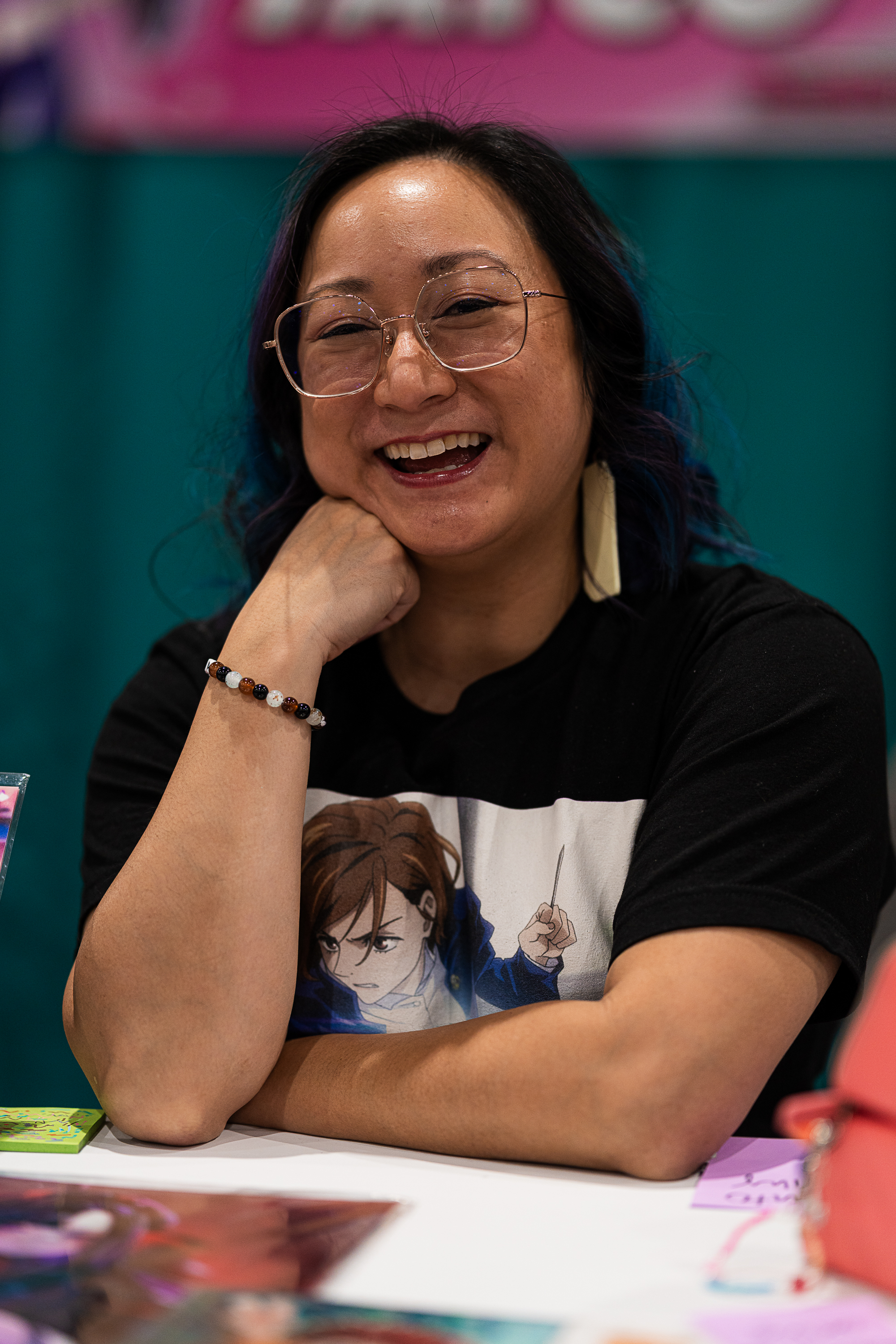
Anne Yatco provided the English voice for Nobara Kugisaki.

Japanese voice actress Asami Seto struggled to voice Nobara, as her personality contrasts heavily with Nobara's brashness, and had to consult and rehearse many times with the producers to get the personality down through her voice acting. According to Anne Yatco, her English voice actress, "she is confident, sassy, and snarky—and I love all of it! I also really appreciate that the dynamic between Nobara, Yuji, and Megumi isn't affected by their gender. So, even though she's 'the girl' in the group, no one treats Nobara with kid gloves or thinks that she is weaker than them". She also touched on Nobara's journey of self-discovery after leaving her home, saying that "I really came into my own as a person after l left home. I think Nobara wants to grow, not just as a sorcerer but also as a human being, and she outgrew her hometown long ago." Yatco compared Nobara's journey of moving from a rural area to Tokyo to her own journey of leaving a small Illinois town to go to Marquette University in Milwaukee and ultimately to Los Angeles.

=== Characterization and themes ===
Nobara is depicted as a logical, creative, authentic, and versatile but judgmental, unempathetic, and irritable fighter. When she meets people, she tends to criticize them because she assumes the worst. She remains calm in stressful situations and can compartmentalize her emotions. Despite her impolite and antagonistic demeanor, she is skilled and cunning, and she cares for her allies.

=== Powers and abilities ===
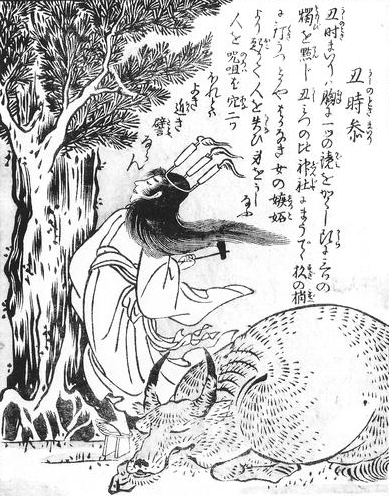
Nobara Kugisaki's abilities are based on the ushi no toki mairi.

Nobara possesses a high pain tolerance, tactical intellect, and precise understanding of the Jujutsu arts. Her innate Cursed Technique, the Straw Doll Technique, has two primary abilities: Resonance, which allows her to use a straw doll in conjunction with a piece of her opponent to inflict long-range damage by striking a nail into the effigy with a Curse Energy-imbued hammer, transferring and amplifying the impact to the actual target's body; and Hairpin, which detonates embedded nails remotely using Cursed Energy to directly kill her opponent. Her abilities are based on the ushi no toki mairi, a traditional method of inflicting curses. Nobara is also highly adept at using her hammer to fire nails at opponents, causing both physical and Cursed Energy damage to her target. In addition to her standard abilities, she has demonstrated the use of Cursed Energy Manipulation—Black Flash, which creates a spatial distortion when Cursed Energy is applied within 0.000001 seconds of a physical hit. It is later revealed that Nobara's grandmother is a sorcerer possessing the same abilities and raised Nobara due to a strained relationship with her mother.

In the second official Jujutsu Kaisen light novel, Nobara is shown to be capable of improvising her technique when deprived of her standard tools. In one instance, she uses her heel as a substitute nail and creates a makeshift doll from rope to successfully perform the Straw Doll Technique and defeat an opponent.

== Appearances ==
=== In Jujutsu Kaisen ===
Nobara first appears in chapter 3 of the manga after arriving in Tokyo by train. She is introduced to her fellow first-year Jujutsu Sorcerers by Satoru Gojo and aids Yuji Itadori in rescuing a child from a Cursed Spirit in an apartment complex. Although initially dismissive toward Yuji and Megumi Fushiguro, the trio quickly become friends as they train together. After training with the second-year students in preparation for the Goodwill Exchange Event against Kyoto Jujutsu High, Nobara is upset upon learning Yuji had been secretly been alive for weeks after his apparent death.

During the battle against the Kyoto students, Nobara voices frustration over gender expectations in the Jujutsu world and her desire to define her worth, but is rendered unconscious after being shot with a rubber bullet by Mai Zen'in. Later, while investigating the special-grade Cursed Wombs known as "Death Paintings" alongside Yuji and Megumi, Nobara helps defeat one of the attackers, but realizes too late that they were not Cursed Spirits but had human origins. Despite this, she tells Yuji she has no regrets about having to kill humans. Following the incident, she and Megumi discuss the danger Yuji poses to others, as Ryomen Sukuna's presence within him continues to attract Cursed Spirits drawn to his fragmented fingers.

Nobara is among the many Jujutsu Sorcerers dispatched to stop Cursed Spirits from launching a large-scale attack on humans. She aids her fellow sorcerers in battle and eventually encounters Mahito, a powerful Cursed Spirit capable of reshaping souls and causing fatal disfigurement merely through physical contact. In the ensuing battle, Nobara miscalculates her attack, allowing Mahito to touch the right side of her face. She experiences a series of vivid memories with her closest companions, as well as her unresolved regret over being unable to reunite with Saori, a girl from her childhood who had been ostracized and forced to leave their hometown. In what appears to be her final conscious moments, Nobara bids farewell to Yuji and asks him to tell their friends that "it wasn't so bad", before her face is blasted open due to Mahito's transfiguration. However, Arata Nitta can partially halt Mahito's technique, leaving her with a chance of survival.

Near the end of the battle against Sukuna, Nobara awakes from her coma and uses her Resonance technique on Sukuna's last finger, which had been hidden by Gojo. This weakens Sukuna and allows Yuji to land a final Black Flash. Megumi is freed from Sukuna's possession. After the battle, Nobara reunites with the two, and the trio reads letters left to them by Gojo. In the epilogue, she is shown reuniting with her estranged mother and grandmother.

=== In Jujutsu Kaisen Modulo ===
In 2086, when humanity faces dangers from the arrival of the Simurian aliens, capable of manipulating cursed energy, the elderly Nobara is questioned on the whereabouts of the strongest sorcerer Yuji Itadori, being one of the last people he is close to. Later on, after Yuji steps in to stop the incursion and help in finally completing what Yuki Tsukumo sought out to do, Yuji meets Nobara again to catch up.

=== In other media ===
Nobara appears in the Jujutsu Kaisen light novel spinoff and gets a novel dedicated to her, Jujutsu Kaisen: Thorny Road at Dawn, where she is the protagonist. Fortnite released skins of characters from Jujutsu Kaisen that included Nobara.

=== Merchandise ===
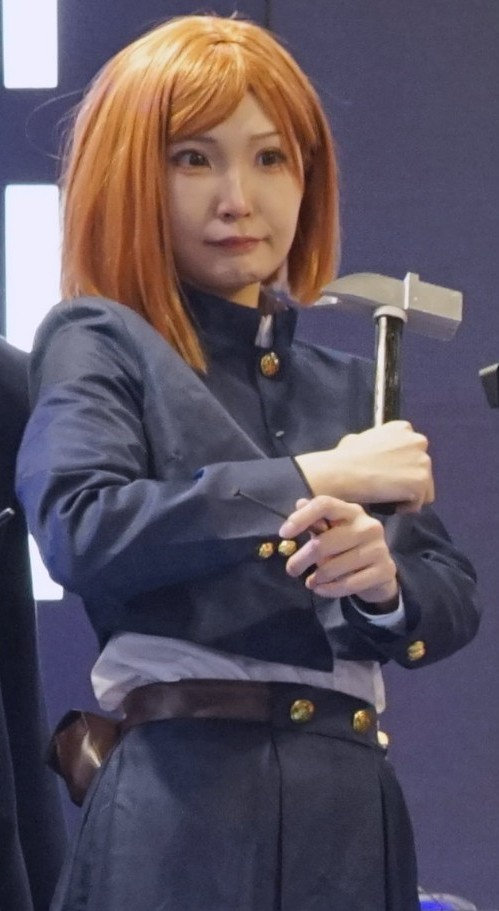
Nobara Kugisaki has been a popular character for cosplay.

Nobara is a popular character in merchandise, including clothing, model figures, Tamagotchi games, and cell phone cases. Nobara also appeared in Jujutsu Kaisen's collaborations with Hello Kitty and Marshmello. Pop Mart collaborated with the series to sell figures of characters from Jujutsu Kaisen, including one of Nobara. Nobara has been a popular character for cosplay.

== Reception ==
=== Popularity ===
Nobara was fifth in the Best Female Character award at the 43rd Anime Grand Prix. At the 6th Crunchyroll Anime Awards, Nobara won the award for Best Girl, while her battle with Yuji Itadori against Eso and Kechizu and voice actor Amanda Brigido were nominated for Best Fight Scene and Best Voice Artist Performance (Portuguese) categories, respectively.

=== Critical response ===
Reception of Nobara's character has been highly positive, with many critics and fans comparing her favorably to other female shōnen protagonists. Ana Diaz of Polygon praised Nobara's inclusion in Jujutsu Kaisen and the series's portrayal of women as a whole. She called a scene where Nobara calls out society's standards on gender roles "poignant" and "stunning", adding that "the scene has staying power, because Jujutsu Kaisen goes a step further than avoiding gender tropes [...] It's not like there's any right way for these young women to deal with the unique pressures they face. The story lets them disagree, and fight for their perspectives and their place." Theo J Ellis of Anime Motivation said of Nobara: "She's undeniably independent, is an individual, and is NEVER reduced to a girl needing help from the knight in shining armor."

Allyson Johnson of InBetweenDrafts praised Nobara for her strength and energetic behavior. Other praise was focused on how Nobara is "loud, aggressive, and always speaks her mind. However, she is more complex than being a mere badass fighter." James Beckett from Anime News Network listed her as his favorite anime character from 2021 due to her aggressive personality and how she stands out in the story. While reviewing the second season of the anime, Beckett criticized the series's failure to portray Nobara's death, considering there is little known about her and the flashback does not add anything notable about her life, which contrasts Kento Nanami's death, which the writer believes was better executed. He compared Nobara's apparent death to the trope of "women in refrigerators"; her fate is used to shock Yuji's character. Nobara's fate was the subject of shock, according to The Television, due to how the character appeared to have died and the anime staff yet kept using her alongside the surviving characters in the ending sequence. According to Joshua Fox, who wrote for Screen Rant, Jujutsu Kaisen does not handle its female characters favorably. Although he praised Nobara's return in chapter 267, he criticized the series's trope of removing a female character so a male character can develop. Despite the manga revealing her survival in the last chapters of the Shinjuku arc, Epic Dope staff lamented the series in general wasted her character due to her disappearance in Shibuya and having no development or explanation for her resurrection later in the series.
