= List of Jujutsu Kaisen chapters =

Cover of the first volume of Jujutsu Kaisen (left) and the special "Jujutsu Kaisen 0→1'" alternative cover (right) for the Jujutsu Kaisen 0 volume, released to connect both stories

Jujutsu Kaisen is a Japanese manga series written and illustrated by Gege Akutami. Akutami first published a four-chapter series in Shueisha's Jump Giga, titled Tokyo Metropolitan Curse Technical School, from April 28 to July 28, 2017. It was later collected and published in a single tankōbon volume, retroactively titled Jujutsu Kaisen 0, on December 4, 2018. Jujutsu Kaisen was serialized in Shueisha's Weekly Shōnen Jump from March 5, 2018, to September 30, 2024. Jujutsu Kaisen follows high school student Yuji Itadori as he joins a secret organization of Jujutsu Sorcerers in order to kill a powerful Curse named Ryomen Sukuna, of whom Yuji becomes the host. The series acts as a sequel to Jujutsu Kaisen 0, focused on the young Yuta Okkotsu who aims to control the curse of his childhood friend, Rika.

The chapters were collected and published by Shueisha in 30 tankōbon volumes, released from July 4, 2018, to December 25, 2024. A nine-page one-shot chapter, following the daily lives of Yuta and the other first-year students, was included in a "Jujutsu Kaisen #0.5 Tokyo Prefectural Jujutsu High School" booklet, released in December 2021, to promote the film adaptation of Jujutsu Kaisen 0. During the month, Shueisha also released an alternative cover featuring Yuta and Yuji to connect it with the first volume of Jujutsu Kaisen.

Shueisha began to simulpublish the series in English on the app and website Manga Plus in January 2019. Viz Media published the first three chapters for its "Jump Start" initiative. In March 2019, Viz Media announced the print release of the series in North America. The 30 volumes were released from December 3, 2019, to May 12, 2026. A collection containing the entire series was released by Viz Media on October 27, 2026.

== Volumes ==
No.	Title	Original release date	English release date
1	Ryomen Sukuna; Ryōmen Sukuna (両面宿儺)	July 4, 2018; 978-4-08-881516-9	December 3, 2019; 978-1-9747-1002-7
1. "Ryomen Sukuna" (両面宿儺, Ryōmen Sukuna); 2. "Secret Execution" (秘匿死刑, Hitoku Shikei); 3. "For Myself" (自分のために, Jibun no Tameni); 4. "Girl of Steel" (鉄骨娘, Tekkotsu Musume); 5. "Start" (始まり, Hajimari); 6. "Fearsome Womb" (呪胎戴天, Jutaitaiten); 7. "Fearsome Womb, Part 2" (呪胎戴天 -弐-, Jutaitaiten -ni-)
Yuji Itadori is a boy who excels at using his physical skills in school sports, but who nevertheless prefers to be part of the Occult Club. The same day his grandfather passes away, he meets Megumi Fushiguro, a sorcerer from the Tokyo Institute of Occult Arts, who is looking for a cursed object of special rank from the most powerful cursed spirit in history: Ryomen Sukuna. Yuji's friends accidentally open the seal of the cursed item and lure the monsters to their location. Together, Yuji and Megumi try to fend off the curses but are cornered. Yuji ingests Sukuna's finger to gain his power and manages to control the demon from taking over his body. After saving his friends, Yuji is sentenced to be executed for becoming Sukuna's vessel, but thanks to Satoru Gojo, the most powerful sorcerer, he gets an extension on the execution so that he can consume all twenty of Sukuna's fingers and die with them. Yuji is thus accepted into the institute and gets to know another first year student, Nobara Kugisaki. As Megumi recovers from his injuries, Gojo sends Yuji and Nobara on a mission to exorcise a curse that haunts an abandoned building in Roppongi. The three are later sent on a mission to rescue survivors at the scene of an apparition of a cursed spirit. Once inside, they realize they are dealing with a high-level cursed spirit. Yuji decides to hold him alone while his companions flee.
2	Fearsome Womb; Jutaitaiten (呪胎戴天)	September 4, 2018; 978-4-08-881608-1	February 4, 2020; 978-1-9747-1003-4
8. "Fearsome Womb, Part 3" (呪胎戴天 -参-, Jutaitaiten -san-); 9. "Fearsome Womb, Part 4" (呪胎戴天 -肆-, Jutaitaiten -shi-); 10. "After the Rain" (雨後, Ugo); 11. "A Dream" (ある夢想, Aru Musō); 12. "Pushing Forward" (邁進, Maishin); 13. "Watching Movies" (映画鑑賞, Eiga kanshō); 14. "Assault" (急襲, Kyūshū); 15. "Domain" (展開, Tenkai); 16. "Affection" (情, Jō)
With Megumi and Nobara safe, Yuji unleashes Sukuna to kill the curse. However, Yuji is unable to immediately regain consciousness and Sukuna rips his heart out to take him hostage. Megumi fights Sukuna and he reveals that he saved Yuji because he wants to save good people. Yuji manages to reclaim his body thanks to Megumi's words, but he dies as a result. Following Yuji's death, Suguru Geto and three of his allies meet at a diner to discuss the incident, revealing that they are the ones behind the spirit's appearance. Megumi and Nobara are taken under the wing of sophomores ahead of a competition against rival Kyoto institute. Within his soul, Sukuna agrees to bring Yuji back to life on the condition that he accepts a binding vow but Yuji refuses and challenges the demon, being defeated. However, Yuji awakens and is reunited with Gojo. Gojo decides to secretly train Yuji and make him control his emotions while he watches movies. Soon after, Gojo is attacked by the cursed spirit Jogo. Using his Cursed Technique, Gojo can stop any assault by using the infinite space between him and his opponent. Predicting that Jogo's next move will be to use Domain Expansion, Gojo brings Yuji there, deciding that this is the perfect time to teach him the technique in question. Jogo takes them both to his Domain where Gojo explains to Yuji the way to counter a Domain and effortlessly decapitates Jogo. The cursed spirit Hanami saves Jogo and the two are reunited with Mahito and their leader Geto. Meanwhile, students from the Kyoto institute arrive to taunt the students from the rival school.
3	Young Fish and Reverse Punishment; Yōgyo to Sakabachi (幼魚と逆罰)	December 4, 2018; 978-4-08-881666-1	April 7, 2020; 978-1-9747-1004-1
17. "Boring" (退屈, Taikutsu); 18. "Bottom" (底辺, Teihen); 19. "Young Fish and Reverse Punishment" (幼魚と逆罰, Yōgyo to Sakabachi); 20. "Young Fish and Reverse Punishment, Part 2" (幼魚と逆罰 -弐-, Yōgyo to Sakabachi -ni-); 21. "Young Fish and Reverse Punishment, Part 3" (幼魚と逆罰 -参-, Yōgyo to Sakabachi -san-); 22. "Young Fish and Reverse Punishment, Part 4" (幼魚と逆罰 -肆-, Yōgyo to Sakabachi -shi-); 23. "Young Fish and Reverse Punishment, Part 5" (幼魚と逆罰 -伍-, Yōgyo to Sakabachi -go-); 24. "Young Fish and Reverse Punishment, Part 6" (幼魚と逆罰 -陸-, Yōgyo to Sakabachi -roku-); 25. "Narrow-Minded" (固陋蠢愚, Korōshungu)
As the confrontation between Megumi and Nobara and the Kyoto students is interrupted by the sophomores, Satoru visits the principal of the Kyoto school to discuss the incident with Yuji and the Cursed Uterus. Junpei Yoshino, a high school student, witnesses the death of his classmates, who have been horribly mutated by Mahito in a movie theater. Rather than being afraid, however, Junpei follows Mahito and gets to know him. At the same time, after finishing his training with Gojo, Yuji is assigned to help first-degree sorcerer Kento Nanami, and the two arrive together at the scene to investigate the murders. Yuji and Nanami face the curses and discover that they are actually humans mutated by Mahito. Yuji, Nanami, and Ijichi come up with a plan to investigate cases of disfigurement across the city. While Yuji and Ijichi are tasked with interrogating Junpei, Nanami confronts Mahito in his underground lair. Yuji bonds with Junpei due to their passion for movies, while Nanami destroys Mahito's lair and both fighters flee the area. After his mother's death, Junpei is misled by Mahito and attacks his school with the intent of making a boy who bullied him in the past pay, so Yuji tries to stop him.
4	I'm Gonna Kill You! Koro Shite Yaru (殺してやる)	March 4, 2019; 978-4-08-881756-9	June 2, 2020; 978-1-9747-1480-3
26. "To You Someday" (いつかの君へ, Itsuka no Kimi e); 27. "What If" (もしも, Moshimo); 28. "I'm Gonna Kill You!" (殺してやる, Koro Shite Yaru); 29. "Growth" (成長, Seichō); 30. "Selfishness" (我儘, Wagamama); 31. "Tomorrow" (また明日, Mata Ashita); 32. "Introspection" (反省, Hansei); 33. "Kyoto Sister-School Goodwill Event – Team Battle, Part 0" (京都姉妹校交流会 -団体戦⓪-, Kyōto Shimai-kō Kōryū-kai -Dantai-sen 0-); 34. "Kyoto Sister-School Goodwill Event – Team Battle, Part 1" (京都姉妹校交流会 -団体戦①-, Kyōto Shimai-kō Kōryū-kai -Dantai-sen 1-)
Yuji stops Junpei and convinces him to cease fighting. Just then, Mahito arrives, who blocks Yuji and turns Junpei into a monster so that he can fight Yuji, trying to force the boy to rely on Sukuna. However, Sukuna refuses to heal Junpei and both curses laugh at Yuji. Junpei dies and Yuji taps into his hatred by hitting Mahito, who speculates that Yuji can sense souls by sharing his body with Sukuna. Nanami joins the battle before Yuji is defeated. Yuji and Nanami fight Mahito and win thanks to Sukuna's interference. Mahito returns to his allies and devises a new plan to revive Sukuna. Meanwhile, students from Tokyo and Kyoto prepare for the exchange meeting, and Gojo reveals to his students that Yuji is alive. While the Tokyo team thinks about how to incorporate Yuji, the Kyoto team plans to kill him. Meanwhile, Gojo meets with Utahime to discuss a possible mole within the witchcraft schools. The event begins and the Tokyo team is immediately attacked by Aoi Todo, the strongest sorcerer of the Kyoto school. Yuji steps forward to face him alone, but not even his strength is enough to overcome Todo's fighting prowess.
5	Kyoto Sister-School Goodwill Event; Kyōto Shimai-kō Kōryū-kai (京都姉妹校交流会)	May 2, 2019; 978-4-08-881828-3	August 4, 2020; 978-1-9747-1481-0
35. "Kyoto Sister-School Goodwill Event – Team Battle, Part 2" (京都姉妹校交流会 -団体戦②-, Kyōto Shimai-kō Kōryū-kai -Dantai-sen 2-); 36. "Kyoto Sister-School Goodwill Event – Team Battle, Part 3" (京都姉妹校交流会 -団体戦③-, Kyōto Shimai-kō Kōryū-kai -Dantai-sen 3-); 37. "Kyoto Sister-School Goodwill Event – Team Battle, Part 4" (京都姉妹校交流会 -団体戦④-, Kyōto Shimai-kō Kōryū-kai -Dantai-sen 4-); 38. "Kyoto Sister-School Goodwill Event – Team Battle, Part 5" (京都姉妹校交流会 -団体戦⑤-, Kyōto Shimai-kō Kōryū-kai -Dantai-sen 5-); 39. "Kyoto Sister-School Goodwill Event – Team Battle, Part 6" (京都姉妹校交流会 -団体戦⑥-, Kyōto Shimai-kō Kōryū-kai -Dantai-sen 6-); 40. "Kyoto Sister-School Goodwill Event – Team Battle, Part 7" (京都姉妹校交流会 -団体戦⑦-, Kyōto Shimai-kō Kōryū-kai -Dantai-sen 7-); 41. "Kyoto Sister-School Goodwill Event – Team Battle, Part 8" (京都姉妹校交流会 -団体戦⑧-, Kyōto Shimai-kō Kōryū-kai -Dantai-sen 8-); 42. "Kyoto Sister-School Goodwill Event – Team Battle, Part 9" (京都姉妹校交流会 -団体戦⑨-, Kyōto Shimai-kō Kōryū-kai -Dantai-sen 9-); 43. "Kyoto Sister-School Goodwill Event – Team Battle, Part 10" (京都姉妹校交流会 -団体戦⑩-, Kyōto Shimai-kō Kōryū-kai -Dantai-sen 10-)
In a series of unexpected events, Todo develops a sympathy for Yuji. Convinced that they are best friends, he abandons his team's plan to kill him. Meanwhile, Megumi and the others start chasing their rivals to protect Yuji. Aoi realizes Yuji's potential and decides to help take him to the next level. Meanwhile, Mechamaru supports Momo in her confrontation with Nobara and Panda. Panda discovers his opponent is a robot controlled remotely by a sorcerer who cannot use his own body. After their confrontation, the two manage to find common ground. At the same time, Kasumi discovers Maki's true power. Nobara nearly defeats Momo, but Mai stops the battle and defeats Nobara. Maki defeats Mai despite her younger sister having revealed her Cursed Technique. Meanwhile, Megumi faces off against Noritoshi Kamo, while Mahito's group prepares to make their move by attacking the institute.
6	Black Flash; Kokusen (黒閃)	July 4, 2019; 978-4-08-881876-4	October 6, 2020; 978-1-9747-1482-7
44. "Kyoto Sister-School Goodwill Event – Team Battle, Part 11" (京都姉妹校交流会 -団体戦⑪-, Kyōto Shimai-kō Kōryū-kai -Dantai-sen 11-); 45. "Sage" (賢者, Kenja); 46. "Time" (時間, Jikan); 47. "Cursed Tools" (呪具, Jugu); 48. "Black Flash" (黒閃, Kokusen); 49. "Constrained" (窮屈, Kyūkutsu); 50. "Feeling" (予感, Yokan); 51. "A Flower Offering" (供花, Kuge); 52. "Nonstandard" (規格外, Kikaku-gai)
The goodwill event is interrupted by the appearance of cursed spirits and curse users, who form a barrier around the area built specifically to keep Gojo out. Meanwhile, Megumi, Inumaki, and Kamo must face Hanami, who claims they are the wrath of the planet personified. Kamo and Inumaki are in trouble, so Maki joins the battle to help Megumi fight Hanami. Yuji and Todo take control of the fight against Hanami, and Todo tells Yuji to unleash a technique known as "Black Flash", which would allow him to become stronger than ever. Thanks to Todo's Cursed Technique, he and Yuji are able to take over fighting the cursed spirit. Gojo stops the battle before Hanami can activate the Domain Expansion. Gojo clears an entire portion of the forest in an attempt to exorcise them, though Hanami manages to flee. Gojo brings the battle to a conclusion, but Mahito is able to escape with several cursed objects, the real target of their invasion.
7	The Origin of Obedience; Kishu Raidō (起首雷同)	October 4, 2019; 978-4-08-882076-7	December 1, 2020; 978-1-9747-1711-8
53. "Completion" (完遂, Kansui); 54. "Jujutsu Koshien" (呪術甲子園, Jujutsu Kōshien); 55. "The Origin of Obedience" (起首雷同, Kishu Raidō); 56. "The Origin of Obedience, Part 2" (起首雷同 -弐-, Kishu Raidō -ni-); 57. "The Origin of Obedience, Part 3" (起首雷同 -参-, Kishu Raidō -san-); 58. "The Origin of Obedience, Part 4" (起首雷同 -肆-, Kishu Raidō -shi-); 59. "The Origin of Obedience, Part 5" (起首雷同 -伍-, Kishu Raidō -go-); 60. "The Origin of Obedience, Part 6" (起首雷同 -陸-, Kishu Raidō -roku-); 61. "The Origin of Obedience, Part 7" (起首雷同 -漆-, Kishu Raidō -shichi-)
In the aftermath of the invasion, as the students recover, the teachers count the victims and try to cancel the event. Students vote to solve the event using a baseball game. After the final competition in which the two sides are able to understand each other, the event ends with the Tokyo school as the winner. The following day, Yuji's group is sent on their next mission. Together with Akari Nitta, they investigate mysterious deaths related to Megumi's old middle school. Meanwhile, Mahito brings the cursed wombs stolen during the raid to life. Megumi discovers that his sister may be the target of the curse that has so far resulted in the deaths of four victims. Near a bridge, the group separates to face the different enemies. Megumi fights a special rank curse of the same type as the one faced at the reformatory, managing to win after clearing its Domain Expansion, while Yuji and Nobara face two of the cursed womb-born brothers, Eso and Kechizu, intent on stealing a Sukuna finger.
8	Hidden Inventory; Kaigyoku (壊玉)	January 4, 2020; 978-4-08-882168-9	February 2, 2021; 978-1-9747-1871-9
62. "The Origin of Obedience, Part 8" (起首雷同-捌-, Kishu Raidō -hachi-); 63. "Accomplices" (共犯, Kyōhan); 64. "It's Like That" (そういうこと, Sō iu Koto); 65. "Hidden Inventory" (壊玉, Kaigyoku); 66. "Hidden Inventory, Part 2" (壊玉ー弐ー, Kaigyoku -ni-); 67. "Hidden Inventory, Part 3" (壊玉ー参ー, Kaigyoku -san-); 68. "Hidden Inventory, Part 4" (壊玉ー肆ー, Kaigyoku -shi-); 69. "Hidden Inventory, Part 5" (壊玉ー伍ー, Kaigyoku -go-); 70. "Hidden Inventory, Part 6" (壊玉ー陸ー, Kaigyoku -roku-)
Yuji and Nobara manage to kill Eso and Kechizu. After the battle, they meet with Megumi to pick up another of Sukuna's fingers, when Sukuna suddenly opens a mouth in Yuji's hand and eats the finger before he can react. A few days later, Nobara meets Yuji's old class company, Yuko Ozawa, and discovers that she has a crush on him. Nobara and Megumi help set up a date with Yuji. Yuko appreciates Yuji's sincerity and realizes she is superficial about her new appearance, deciding not to reveal her feelings about him. In 2006, when Gojo and Geto were both sophomores, they were assigned a mission: to escort the Star Plasma Vessel Riko Amanai, a girl whose purpose was to merge with the immortal sorcerer Tengen. However, two groups were interested in killing the girl: the curse users group Q and the religious group "Time Vessel Association", which hired Megumi's father, the sorcerer killer Toji Fushiguro, for this purpose. To do this, Toji placed a 30 million yen bounty on Riko's head, and the curse users invade her school in an attempt to collect it. Satoru and Suguru defeat the enemies and decide to spend the rest of the time relaxing while waiting for the bounty time limit. The day Riko was to merge with Tengen, Gojo and the others were attacked by Toji.
9	Premature Death; Gyokusetsu (玉折)	January 4, 2020; 978-4-08-882218-1	April 6, 2021; 978-1-9747-1872-6
71. "Hidden Inventory, Part 7" (壊玉ー漆ー, Kaigyoku -shichi-); 72. "Hidden Inventory, Part 8" (壊玉ー捌ー, Kaigyoku -hachi-); 73. "Hidden Inventory, Part 9" (壊玉ー玖ー, Kaigyoku -ku-); 74. "Hidden Inventory, Part 10" (壊玉ー拾ー, Kaigyoku -jū-); 75. "Hidden Inventory, Part 11" (壊玉ー拾壱ー, Kaigyoku -jū ichi-); 76. "Premature Death" (玉折, Gyokusetsu); 77. "Premature Death, Part 2" (玉折 -弐-, Gyokusetsu -ni-); 78. "Premature Death, Part 3" (玉折 -参-, Gyokusetsu -san-); 79. "A Taste of Things to Come" (これからの話, Korekara no Hanashi)
Gojo decides to keep Toji at bay while Geto completes the mission. Toji manages to stab Gojo several times with a cursed tool that bypasses his Infinity. Inside the institute, Riko reveals that she had changed her mind about the merger with Tengen, but she is suddenly shot dead by Toji. Toji then easily defeats Geto and his Curses, and takes Riko's corpse to the sect seat. As Toji leaves the site, he re-encounters Gojo, who had used a Reverse Cursed technique to heal himself. Gojo fatally wounds Toji, who before his death reveals that his son would be sold to the Zen'in clan in a couple of years. A year later, Geto began to doubt his duties as a sorcerer, annoyed by the people he should protect, and became convinced that to break the cycle in which every sorcerer is stuck in, it was necessary to kill all non-sorcerers and prevent the birth of other cursed spirits. He breaks free from the school, causing a massacre in a village, with him being declared a curse user. Gojo confronts his former friend about his crimes, but is unable to kill him and lets him go. Geto takes over the "Time Vessel Association", while Gojo makes an acquaintance with a young Megumi. In the present, Gojo sends Yuji and the others with Utahime, who she claims to have discovered the identity of the mole: Mechamaru. Geto and Mahito get to Mechamaru first, revealing he made a deal to act as their mole for Mahito healing him with his powers. After being recovered, Mechamaru prepares to face the two.
10	Evening Festival; Yoimatsuri (宵祭り)	March 4, 2020; 978-4-08-882274-7	June 1, 2021; 978-1-9747-2075-0
80. "Evening Festival" (宵祭り, Yoimatsuri); 81. "Evening Festival, Part 2" (宵祭り-弐-, Yoimatsuri -ni-); 82. "Evening Festival, Part 3" (宵祭り-参-, Yoimatsuri -san-); 83. "The Shibuya Incident, Part 1" (渋谷事変, Shibuya Jihen); 84. "The Shibuya Incident, Part 2" (渋谷事変 2, Shibuya Jihen 2); 85. "The Shibuya Incident, Part 3" (渋谷事変 3, Shibuya Jihen 3); 86. "The Shibuya Incident, Part 4" (渋谷事変 4, Shibuya Jihen 4); 87. "The Shibuya Incident, Part 5" (渋谷事変 5, Shibuya Jihen 5); 88. "The Shibuya Incident, Part 6" (渋谷事変 6, Shibuya Jihen 6)
Mechamaru unleashes a giant robot to fight Mahito, with the intention of warning his classmates about the curses' plans for October 31st in Shibuya. Despite his tactics, he ends up succumbing to Mahito's tricks and is defeated. On the day of the plan, numerous sorcerers gather in Shibuya, where many civilians have been imprisoned by a veil. Gojo enters the veil and meets Jogo, Choso, and Hanami. Gojo faces the curses and kills Hanami as Mei Mei's team (herself, Ui Ui, and Yuji) head to Meiji-Jingu-Mae station, where another veil is found. Yuji kills a grasshopper-like curse and destroys that veil, while Mahito heads to Shibuya to help his companions. To confront the enemies, Gojo activates his Domain, but in the space of 0.2 seconds, Geto shows up and activates the cursed object "Prison Realm", planning to seal Gojo.
11	The Shibuya Incident -Gate Open- Shibuya Jihen -Kaimon- (渋谷事変 -開門-)	June 4, 2020; 978-4-08-882296-9	August 3, 2021; 978-1-9747-2284-6
89. "The Shibuya Incident, Part 7" (渋谷事変 7, Shibuya Jihen 7); 90. "The Shibuya Incident, Part 8" (渋谷事変 8, Shibuya Jihen 8); 91. "The Shibuya Incident, Part 9" (渋谷事変 9, Shibuya Jihen 9); 92. "The Shibuya Incident, Part 10" (渋谷事変 10, Shibuya Jihen 10); 93. "The Shibuya Incident, Part 11" (渋谷事変 11, Shibuya Jihen 11); 94. "The Shibuya Incident, Part 12" (渋谷事変 12, Shibuya Jihen 12); 95. "The Shibuya Incident, Part 13" (渋谷事変 13, Shibuya Jihen 13); 96. "The Shibuya Incident, Part 14" (渋谷事変 14, Shibuya Jihen 14); 97. "The Shibuya Incident, Part 15" (渋谷事変 15, Shibuya Jihen 15)
Before being sealed, Gojo asks Geto who he is, stating that his soul knows it is not him, having killed him the previous year. The man then reveals that he is an impostor who controls Geto's body through a technique that allows him to possess the bodies by changing his brain. While Gojo is sealed, Mei Mei's group is informed of the events by a copy of Mechamaru. Meanwhile, the fake Geto is forced to let go of the seal, unable to move Gojo until they have the time to neutralize him. Mahito, Jogo, and Choso argue whether Yuji should be killed or Sukuna released, so decide to settle it with whoever finds him first, while the fake Geto remains to guard the seal. Yuji is joined by Nanami's team (made up of him, Megumi, and Ino) and tells the others to take care of the veil that prevents the sorcerers from entering Shibuya. Yuji and Megumi face one of the two sorcerers responsible for the veil, Awasaka, while Ino faces the other, the old Ogami and her niece. The old woman uses her technique to bring Toji back to life through her nephew, while Yuji and Megumi understand the secret of Awasaka's technique and defeat him.
12	The Shibuya Incident -Summon- Shibuya Jihen -Kōrei- (渋谷事変 -降霊-)	August 4, 2020; 978-4-08-882381-2	October 5, 2021; 978-1-9747-2285-3
98. "The Shibuya Incident, Part 16" (渋谷事変 16, Shibuya Jihen 16); 99. "The Shibuya Incident, Part 17" (渋谷事変 17, Shibuya Jihen 17); 100. "The Shibuya Incident, Part 18" (渋谷事変 18, Shibuya Jihen 18); 101. "The Shibuya Incident, Part 19" (渋谷事変 19, Shibuya Jihen 19); 102. "The Shibuya Incident, Part 20" (渋谷事変 20, Shibuya Jihen 20); 103. "The Shibuya Incident, Part 21" (渋谷事変 21, Shibuya Jihen 21); 104. "The Shibuya Incident, Part 22" (渋谷事変 22, Shibuya Jihen 22); 105. "The Shibuya Incident, Part 23" (渋谷事変 23, Shibuya Jihen 23); 106. "The Shibuya Incident, Part 24" (渋谷事変 24, Shibuya Jihen 24)
The soul of Toji usurps the old woman's nephew and begins to go on a rampage. Nobara faces off against curse user Haruta Shigemo, and is rescued by Nanami who defeats him. Toge helps to escort panicking civilians from the transfigured humans, and Mei Mei fights a special grade curse summoned by "Pseudo-Geto". At Shibuya Station, Yuji is cornered by Choso, intending to avenge the death of his brothers. The two have a hard-hitting battle, with Choso eventually coming out on top, however before he can finish him off, he is suddenly hit with fragmented memories of Yuji as one of his brothers, causing him to flee confused and distraught. Elsewhere, Maki, Nanami, and Naobito Zeni'n deal with the curse spirit Dagon. Naobito effortlessly pummels Dagon until he becomes a full-fledged cursed spirit.
13	The Shibuya Incident -Thunderclap- Shibuya Jihen -Hekireki- (渋谷事変 -霹靂-)	October 2, 2020; 978-4-08-882429-1	December 7, 2021; 978-1-9747-2342-3
107. "The Shibuya Incident, Part 25" (渋谷事変 25, Shibuya Jihen 25); 108. "The Shibuya Incident, Part 26" (渋谷事変 26, Shibuya Jihen 26); 109. "The Shibuya Incident, Part 27" (渋谷事変 27, Shibuya Jihen 27); 110. "The Shibuya Incident, Part 28" (渋谷事変 28, Shibuya Jihen 28); 111. "The Shibuya Incident, Part 29" (渋谷事変 29, Shibuya Jihen 29); 112. "The Shibuya Incident, Part 30" (渋谷事変 30, Shibuya Jihen 30); 113. "The Shibuya Incident, Part 31" (渋谷事変 31, Shibuya Jihen 31); 114. "The Shibuya Incident, Part 32" (渋谷事変 32, Shibuya Jihen 32); 115. "The Shibuya Incident, Part 33" (渋谷事変 33, Shibuya Jihen 33)
Dagon unleashes his Domain Expansion, trapping Maki, Nanami, and Naobito within. Megumi breaks into the Domain to assist and help them escape, only to be caught off guard when Toji suddenly arrives. He effortlessly defeats Dagon, only to drag Megumi away. The remaining three are then suddenly burned alive by Jogo, who senses Sukuna's presence. Geto's followers, the Hasaba sisters, feed Yuji a finger, followed by Jogo force feeding him ten fingers, awakening Sukuna, now at 15-fingers of power. Despite initially claiming to hear them out, Sukuna promptly kills the Hasaba sisters, and challenges Jogo to a fight to cooperate with him. Elsewhere, Megumi does battle against Toji, who after being satisfied that Megumi chooses 'Fushiguro' instead of 'Zeni'n' as his name, kills himself. Before he can plan his next move, Megumi is caught off guard by Shigemo, who survived his battle with Nanami. Panda and Kusakabe fight against more of Geto's followers, but end up trapped in the middle of Sukuna and Jogo's battle, which they barely escape from.
14	The Shibuya Incident -Right and Wrong- Shibuya Jihen -Rihi- (渋谷事変 -理非-)	January 4, 2021; 978-4-08-882534-2	February 1, 2022; 978-1-9747-2532-8
116. "The Shibuya Incident, Part 34" (渋谷事変 34, Shibuya Jihen 34); 117. "The Shibuya Incident, Part 35" (渋谷事変 35, Shibuya Jihen 35); 118. "The Shibuya Incident, Part 36" (渋谷事変 36, Shibuya Jihen 36); 119. "The Shibuya Incident, Part 37" (渋谷事変 37, Shibuya Jihen 37); 120. "The Shibuya Incident, Part 38" (渋谷事変 38, Shibuya Jihen 38); 121. "The Shibuya Incident, Part 39" (渋谷事変 39, Shibuya Jihen 39); 122. "The Shibuya Incident, Part 40" (渋谷事変 40, Shibuya Jihen 40); 123. "The Shibuya Incident, Part 41" (渋谷事変 41, Shibuya Jihen 41); 124. "The Shibuya Incident, Part 42" (渋谷事変 42, Shibuya Jihen 42)
Sukuna reveals his ability to manipulate fire, overpowering and incinerating Jogo, but not before acknowledging his strength. Sukuna then encounters Urarame, who he recognizes from the past, only to leave when he senses something up with Megumi. As a last ditch effort against Shigemo, Megumi summons the out-of-control shikigami Mahoraga, but the two are saved by Sukuna before it can kill them. Realizing it is much tougher than he expected, Sukuna unleashes his Domain Expansion, obliterating the shikigami while also decimating everything and everyone in Shibuya around him. He drops Megumi off to be healed before returning control of the body to Yuji, who reacts in horror over the death and destruction he "caused". Yuji then encounters a half-burned Nanami killed by Mahito, leading the two sworn enemies to once again fight. During the encounter, Mahito splits himself up to have his double fight Nobara, with the intention of breaking Yuji's spirit more, but Nobara's Cursed Technique turns out to be one of his weaknesses. In response, the double lures Nobara to the original's location, leading Nobara to be touched by Mahito.
15	The Shibuya Incident -Transformation- Shibuya Jihen -Henshin- (渋谷事変 -変身-)	March 4, 2021; 978-4-08-882581-6	April 5, 2022; 978-1-9747-2710-0
125. "A Story About That Girl" (あの子の話, Ano Ko no Hanashi); 126. "The Shibuya Incident, Part 43" (渋谷事変 43, Shibuya Jihen 43); 127. "The Shibuya Incident, Part 44" (渋谷事変 44, Shibuya Jihen 44); 128. "The Shibuya Incident, Part 45" (渋谷事変 45, Shibuya Jihen 45); 129. "The Shibuya Incident, Part 46" (渋谷事変 46, Shibuya Jihen 46); 130. "The Shibuya Incident, Part 47" (渋谷事変 47, Shibuya Jihen 47); 131. "The Shibuya Incident, Part 48" (渋谷事変 48, Shibuya Jihen 48); 132. "The Shibuya Incident, Part 49" (渋谷事変 49, Shibuya Jihen 49); 133. "The Shibuya Incident, Part 50" (渋谷事変 50, Shibuya Jihen 50)
As a result of Mahito's Cursed Technique, Nobara is seemingly killed after her left eye explodes. Yuji's resolve is broken due to this, but Todo then arrives to help him fight and regain his drive. As the three push themselves to their limits, Mahito attempts to remove Todo from the fight using his Cursed Technique, but Todo is able to cut off his hand before it can greatly effect him. Mahito proceeds to transform himself, having found the "true" form of his soul, but Yuji's power is enough to overwhelm and defeat him. Before Yuji can finish him off, Pseudo-Geto appears, absorbing Mahito and ready to reveal his full plans.
16	The Shibuya Incident -Gate Closed- Shibuya Jihen -Heimon- (渋谷事変 -閉門-)	June 4, 2021; 978-4-08-882688-2	June 21, 2022; 978-1-9747-2898-5
134. "The Shibuya Incident, Part 51" (渋谷事変 51, Shibuya Jihen 51); 135. "The Shibuya Incident, Part 52" (渋谷事変 52, Shibuya Jihen 52); 136. "The Shibuya Incident, Part 53" (渋谷事変 53, Shibuya Jihen 53); 137. "Hard and White" (堅白, Kenpaku); 138. "The Zen'in Clan" (禪院家, Zen'in-ke); 139. "Hunter" (狩人, Kariudo); 140. "Execution" (執行, Shikkō); 141. "The Front of the Back" (うしろのしょうめん, Ushiro no Shōmen); 142. "A Big Brother's Back" (お兄ちゃんの背中, Onii-chan no Senaka)
As Pseudo-Geto explains his plan to use Geto's ability to control cursed spirits for his goals, the Kyoto Students arrive to back Yuji up. They are then surprised by Choso, now believing to be Yuji's brother, and revealing Pseudo-Geto to be his creator, "Noritoshi Kamo"; further revealed to be just one of his many aliases. Everyone tries one last attempt to reclaim the Prison Realm, but even with Yuki Tsukumo's help, Pseudo-Geto uses Idle Transfiguration to manipulate the souls of everyone he has marked across the years, as well as unleashing his cursed spirits, all to return the world to the Heian era, and escapes. In the aftermath of the Shibuya incident, Tokyo is overrun by curses, Gojo is considered an accomplice and exiled, and Yuji's execution is resumed, with Yuta Okkotsu assigned as an executioner. Yuji and Choso remain in Tokyo to deal with the curses, when they are confronted by Yuta and Naoya Zen'in, who wants to kill Megumi after he was named head of the Zen'ins. Yuta seemingly kills Yuji stabbing him in the heart, and defeats Choso right after.
17	Perfect Preparation; Ashi o Fukumu (葦を啣む)	October 4, 2021; 978-4-08-882736-0	August 16, 2022; 978-1-9747-3233-3
143. "One More Time" (もう一度, Mōichido); 144. "That Place" (あの場所, Ano Basho); 145. "The Back" (裏, Ura); 146. "About the Culling Game" (死滅回遊について, Shimetsukaiyū ni Tsuite); 147. "Even Pandas" (パンダだって, Panda Datte); 148. "Perfect Preparation" (葦を啣む, Ashi o Fukumu); 149. "Perfect Preparation, Part 2" (葦を啣む-弐-, Ashi o Fukumu -ni-); 150. "Perfect Preparation, Part 3" (葦を啣む-参-, Ashi o Fukumu -san-); 151. "Perfect Preparation, Part 4" (葦を啣む-肆-, Ashi o Fukumu -shi-); 152. "Perfect Preparation, Epilogue" (葦を啣む-跋-, Ashi o Fukumu -batsu-)
After having a dream where he sees his mother with the same scars as "Kamo", Yuji awakens alive to find that Yuta became his executioner to protect him, as they reunite with Megumi. He reveals that "Kamo" has started a "Culling Game" that everyone with Cursed Energy will be forced into, and that his sister, Tsumiki, is caught in the middle of it. To learn more information, the three plus Choso head to Jujutsu High with a burned Maki and Yuki to question Master Tengen. He reveals that "Kamo", also known as Pseudo-Geto, is an ancient sorcerer known as Kenjaku, and that he plans to use Tengen's vulnerable state to fuse all of humanity with him, leading to chaos through the curses. The group develop a plan to work around the complex rules of the Culling Game, while intending to seek out the angel Hana Kurusu, who they could use to help break Gojo out of the Prison Realm. While Yuki and Choso stay behind to guard Tengen, Maki goes to the Zen'in compound to collect cursed tools. Instead she finds it a trap set by her father with the intention to kill her and Mai. Knowing that she will be incomplete as long as she is alive, Mai sacrifices herself, imbuing Maki with a tremendous amount of power and giving her Toji's sword, as she proceeds to completely decimate the majority of the Zen'in clan, including her father, mother, and Naoya.
18	Fever; Netsu (熱)	December 25, 2021; 978-4-08-882848-0	December 20, 2022; 978-1-9747-3439-9
153. "Underground Fight Club" (賭け試合, Kake Shiai); 154. "Sneaking In" (潜入, Sen'nyū); 155. "Fever" (熱, Netsu); 156. "Twinkling Stars" (きらきら星, Kira Kira Boshi); 157. "Cog" (部品, Buhin); 158. "Kogane" (コガネ); 159. "Judgment" (裁き, Sabaki); 160. "Colony" (結界, Kekkai); 161. "Tokyo No. 1 Colony, Part 1" (東京第1結界①, Tōkyō Dai-Ichi Koronī 1)
Yuji, Megumi, and Panda seek out suspended Jujutsu High third year student Kinji Hakari in order to recruit his strength to their cause. They infiltrate his underground fight club, and after being forced to fight against him and fellow suspendee Kirara Hoshi, they are able to come to an understanding and agree to assist. Aware that players with enough points in the Culling Game can create new rules, they decide to seek out players with said points to request them to create rules, including allowing players to transfer points between each other. One of their targets is Hiromi Higuruma, a criminal defense lawyer who's pushed to the brink and decides to take the law into his own hand once his power was awakened. Yuji and Megumi enter the Tokyo No. 1 Colony together, while Panda and Hakari go to the Tokyo No. 2 Colony. Upon entering, Yuji and Megumi are suddenly separated and immediately targeted by various Culling Game players.
19	Tokyo No. 1 Colony: Angry Man; Tōkyō Dai-Ichi Koronī -Okoreru Otoko- (東京第一結界 -怒れる男-)	April 4, 2022; 978-4-08-883068-1; 978-4-08-908414-4 (limited edition)	March 21, 2023; 978-1-9747-3627-0
162. "Tokyo No. 1 Colony, Part 2" (東京第1結界②, Tōkyō Dai-Ichi Koronī 2); 163. "Tokyo No. 1 Colony, Part 3" (東京第1結界③, Tōkyō Dai-Ichi Koronī 3); 164. "Tokyo No. 1 Colony, Part 4" (東京第1結界④, Tōkyō Dai-Ichi Koronī 4); 165. "Tokyo No. 1 Colony, Part 5" (東京第1結界⑤, Tōkyō Dai-Ichi Koronī 5); 166. "Tokyo No. 1 Colony, Part 6" (東京第1結界⑥, Tōkyō Dai-Ichi Koronī 6); 167. "Tokyo No. 1 Colony, Part 7" (東京第1結界⑦, Tōkyō Dai-Ichi Koronī 7); 168. "Tokyo No. 1 Colony, Part 8" (東京第1結界⑧, Tōkyō Dai-Ichi Koronī 8); 169. "Tokyo No. 1 Colony, Part 9" (東京第1結界⑨, Tōkyō Dai-Ichi Koronī 9); 170. "Tokyo No. 1 Colony, Part 10" (東京第1結界⑩, Tōkyō Dai-Ichi Koronī 10); 171. "Tokyo No. 1 Colony, Part 11" (東京第1結界⑪, Tōkyō Dai-Ichi Koronī 11)
Yuji and Megumi both seek assistance to track down Higuruma, but while Yuji ends up finding him, Megumi is deceived and taken to a man named Reggie Star. Yuji fails to convince Higuruma to use his points to add the rule so is forced to fight him. Higuruma activates his Domain Expansion, which results in a courtroom battle where Yuji is on trial for a crime in his past (playing underage at a pachinko). He fails to prove his innocence and thus must do battle with him without Cursed Energy, until he requests a retrial. This time Yuji is on trial for all the deaths in Shibuya, which he unhesitatingly confesses to being responsible for. Despite being sentenced to death, Higuruma cannot go through with it, knowing Sukuna is the real guilty party, but seeing Yuji's own guilt reminds him why he got into law in the first place, using his points to create the ability to transfer points to each other, intending to turn himself in when the game is over. Meanwhile, Reggie attempts to convince Megumi to join their side but he refuses and has to fight them all off. He is helped by another sorcerer known as Fumihiko Takaba, a comedian who unknowingly possesses an extremely strong ability, who deals with the other sorcerers while Megumi fights Reggie. Megumi ends up activating his Domain Expansion and the two have an all-out struggle for domination.
20	Sendai Colony -The Height of the Feast- Sendai Koronī -Utage Nakaba- (仙台結界 -宴半ば-)	August 4, 2022; 978-4-08-883201-2; 978-4-08-908434-2 (limited edition)	August 15, 2023; 978-1-9747-3874-8
172. "Tokyo No. 1 Colony, Part 12" (東京第1結界⑫, Tōkyō Dai-Ichi Koronī 12); 173. "Tokyo No. 1 Colony, Part 13" (東京第1結界⑬, Tōkyō Dai-Ichi Koronī 13); 174. "Sendai Colony, Part 1" (仙台結界①, Sendai Koronī 1); 175. "Sendai Colony, Part 2" (仙台結界②, Sendai Koronī 2); 176. "Sendai Colony, Part 3" (仙台結界③, Sendai Koronī 3); 177. "Sendai Colony, Part 4" (仙台結界④, Sendai Koronī 4); 178. "Sendai Colony, Part 5" (仙台結界⑤, Sendai Koronī 5); 179. "Sendai Colony, Part 6" (仙台結界⑥, Sendai Koronī 6); 180. "Sendai Colony, Part 7" (仙台結界⑦, Sendai Koronī 7)
Megumi and Reggie continue their struggle for control, before Megumi eventually comes out on top. Reggie uses his last moments to give Megumi his points before bleeding out. Megumi soon passes out from exhaustion, when the Angel Hana Kurusu descends upon him. In the Sendai Colony, Yuta has been defending a group of civilians while fighting off any threat in his way. This ends up catching the attention of players Ryu Ishigori, Takako Uro, and the curse spirit Kurourushi. Yuta tries to fight Kurourushi without revealing too much of his abilities, but eventually Uro becomes curious and joins the battle. Yuta tries to understand why she is fighting in the first place, annoying her as this brings up painful memories from her past. Ishigori next joins the fight, believing that fighting Yuta will help him satisfy his insatiable hunger. Yuta is forced to release his true power, summoning "Rika" to overwhelm the two. The three then activate a simultaneous "Domain Expansion", but before the effects can be revealed, Kuruourushi returns to disrupt it. Ishigori takes Uro and Kuruourushi out of the fight, intending to fully face Yuta alone, and understanding how he feels, he agrees to give it is all. Yuta is able to defeat Ishigori, but provides him a battle that is enough to satisfy his hunger.
21	Tokyo No. 2 Colony -Incredible Luck- Tōkyō Dai-Ni Koronī -Gōun- (東京第二結界 -豪運-)	December 2, 2022; 978-4-08-883311-8	November 21, 2023; 978-1-9747-4122-9
181. "Tokyo No. 2 Colony, Part 1" (東京第2結界①, Tōkyō Dai-Ni Koronī 1); 182. "Tokyo No. 2 Colony, Part 2" (東京第2結界②, Tōkyō Dai-Ni Koronī 2); 183. "Tokyo No. 2 Colony, Part 3" (東京第2結界③, Tōkyō Dai-Ni Koronī 3); 184. "Tokyo No. 2 Colony, Part 4" (東京第2結界④, Tōkyō Dai-Ni Koronī 4); 185. "Bye-Bye" (バイバイ, BaiBai); 186. "Tokyo No. 2 Colony, Part 5" (東京第2結界⑤, Tōkyō Dai-Ni Koronī 5); 187. "Tokyo No. 2 Colony, Part 6" (東京第2結界⑥, Tōkyō Dai-Ni Koronī 6); 188. "Tokyo No. 2 Colony, Part 7" (東京第2結界⑦, Tōkyō Dai-Ni Koronī 7); 189. "Tokyo No. 2 Colony, Part 8" (東京第2結界⑧, Tōkyō Dai-Ni Koronī 8); 190. "Tokyo No. 2 Colony, Part 9" (東京第2結界⑨, Tōkyō Dai-Ni Koronī 9)
Yuta takes the points from the defeated Uro and Ishigori. Meanwhile in the Tokyo No. 2 Colony, Hakari meets aspiring mangaka Charles Bernard, who's been thrown into despair upon being enthralled in the Culling Game, so Hakari battles him. Hakari uses his Domain Expansion, a pachinko-inspired "Idle Death Game", to eventually overwhelm Charles. Elsewhere, Panda encounters Hajime Kashimo, a reincarnated sorcerer who easily overpowers him and destroys the "siblings" within Panda. He demands to know of Sukuna's whereabouts, desiring to fight him. Hakari saves Panda and using his newfound boost courtesy of his jackpot, making him unkillable, battles Kashimo. The two duke it out with Hakari continuing to get lucky with his Domain Expansion, restarting his invincibility. Kashimo attempts a last ditch effort with an ultimate electric attack, but Hakari survives, instead making a deal with Kashimo to help them out in favour of getting to fight Sukuna, which he agrees to. The group meet up with the Kyoto students who are preparing the next stage of their plan, revealing that Maki has been going on a rampage in the colonies.
22	Sakurajima Colony -Rebirth- Sakura-jima Koronī -Tensei- (櫻島結界-転生-)	March 3, 2023; 978-4-08-883434-4	April 16, 2024; 978-1-9747-4341-4
191. "Sakurajima Colony, Part 1" (桜島結界①, Sakura-jima Koronī 1); 192. "Sakurajima Colony, Part 2" (桜島結界②, Sakura-jima Koronī 2); 193. "Sakurajima Colony, Part 3" (桜島結界③, Sakura-jima Koronī 3); 194. "Sakurajima Colony, Part 4" (桜島結界④, Sakura-jima Koronī 4); 195. "Sakurajima Colony, Part 5" (桜島結界⑤, Sakura-jima Koronī 5); 196. "Sakurajima Colony, Part 6" (桜島結界⑥, Sakura-jima Koronī 6); 197. "Sakurajima Colony, Part 7" (桜島結界⑦, Sakura-jima Koronī 7); 198. "Sakurajima Colony, Part 8" (桜島結界⑧, Sakura-jima Koronī 8); 199. "Resentful Names" (仇名, Adana)
Kenjaku uses his identity as the original Noritoshi Kamo to become the head of the Kamo clan, crushing the student Kamo's plans, so he convenes with Maki in the Sakurajima Colony. They are then suddenly attacked by a cursed spirit, which is actually Naoya, reborn as a curse due to not being killed by Cursed Energy. He enters a cursed womb state and successfully evolves, overpowering Maki and Kamo thanks to his incredible speed courtesy of his Cursed Technique. Kamo keeps Naoya busy while Maki heals, only for their fight to be interrupted by the arrival of two reincarnated sorcerers, the katana-obsessed Hagane Daido and the sumo-obsessed Rokujushi Miyo. Daido uses Maki's sword to fight Naoya while Maki enters Miyo's Simple Domain, where he helps her reach an epiphany and unlock her true potential. Now that she has reached the same level as Toji, an enraged Naoya activates his Domain Expansion, trapping the sorcerers, but thanks to having no Cursed Energy, Maki is able to stab him with her sword, killing him. Meanwhile back in the Tokyo No. 1 colony, Megumi awakens alongside Hana, Yuji, and Takaba. They learn that Hana and Angel share a symbiotic relationship and their goal is to take out the reincarnated sorcerers. They agree to remove the seal on the Prison Realm if they help them track down "the Disgraced One", which is Sukuna.
23	Stars and Oil; Hoshi to Abura (星と油)	July 4, 2023; 978-4-08-883628-7	August 20, 2024; 978-1-9747-4629-3
200. "Direct Talks, Part 1" (直接会談①, Chokusetsu Kaidan 1); 201. "Direct Talks, Part 2" (直接会談②, Chokusetsu Kaidan 2); 202. "Blood and Oil, Part 1" (血と油①, Chi to Abura 1); 203. "Blood and Oil, Part 2" (血と油②, Chi to Abura 2); 204. "Blood and Oil, Part 3" (血と油③, Chi to Abura 3); 205. "Stars and Oil, Part 1" (星と油①, Hoshi to Abura 1); 206. "Stars and Oil, Part 2" (星と油②, Hoshi to Abura 2); 207. "Stars and Oil, Part 3" (星と油③, Hoshi to Abura 3); 208. "Stars and Oil, Part 4" (星と油④, Hoshi to Abura 4)
Prior to the Shibuya Incident, Kenjaku revealed the existence of Cursed Energy in Japan to the American government and other nations. He convinced them to use the Culling Games as an opportunity to kidnap sorcerers and curse users to use as an energy source. In the present, Yuji's group are surprised by the sudden increase in players as the American soldiers begin to infiltrate the colony. Meanwhile, with the Culling Games having served its purpose, Kenjaku storms Jujutsu High to capture Tengen. Choso, and then Yuki, each fight him, with the latter in particular doing enough damage to force Kenjaku to reveal his other secret abilities, however they still prove to not be enough to overpower him. Yuki sacrifices herself, allowing Choso to escape, and turns herself into a miniature black hole in an attempt to finish Kenjaku for good, however he still manages to survive and corners the weakened Tengen.
24	Fearsome Womb: Recurrence; Jutaitaiten -Saiki (呪胎戴天-再帰-)	October 4, 2023; 978-4-08-883670-6	December 10, 2024; 978-1-9747-4948-5
209. "Offering to the Unknown, Part 1" (未知への供物, Michi e no Kumotsu); 210. "Offering to the Unknown, Part 2" (未知への供物②, Michi e no Kumotsu 2); 211. "The Ripening" (熟む, Umu); 212. "The Festering" (膿む ②, Umu 2); 213. "Fearsome Womb, Part 5" (呪胎戴天 -伍-, Jutaitaiten -go-); 214. "Fearsome Womb, Part 6" (呪胎戴天 -陸-, Jutaitaiten -roku-); 215. "Fearsome Womb, Part 7" (呪胎戴天 -漆-, Jutaitaiten -shichi-); 216. "Bath, Part 1" (浴, Yoku); 217. "Bath, Part 2" (浴②, Yoku 2)
The American soldiers storm the colony in an attempt to capture sorcerers, however they turn out to be mere fodder for the curse spirits, so Yuji and his group go to help as many as they can. Afterwards, they learn of Yuki's defeat and Tengen now being under Kenjaku's control, so accelerate their plans of attack. They have Tsumiki escorted into the colony, in order to give her points, however to everyone's shock, she uses the points to add a new rule. She reveals that she is actually a reincarnated sorcerer known as Yorozu, who has taken over Tsumiki's body, and flies away. Before everyone can react, Sukuna activates his "Enchain" Binding Vow, giving him complete control of Yuji's body for a minute. He uses this to execute his long-awaited plan: taking over Megumi's body by force feeding him one of Yuji's fingers. Hana and Angel attempt to destroy Sukuna, but he survives and incapacitates her. Yuji, later joined by Maki, fight Sukuna head-on, who is held back due to Megumi's soul restricting his Cursed Energy input, until he is saved by Uraume, and escapes. Sukuna proceeds to drown Megumi's soul in curses in order to gain complete control of the body, deciding to finish the deed by killing Tsumiki. He confronts Yorozu in Sendai, who is completely infatuated with Sukuna and challenges him to a fight to win his love.
25	Inhuman Makyo Shinjuku Showdown; Jingai Makyō Shinjuku Kessen (人外魔境新宿決戦)	January 4, 2024; 978-4-08-883799-4	March 11, 2025; 978-1-9747-5188-4
218. "Bath, Part 3" (浴③, Yoku 3); 219. "Bath, Part 4" (浴④, Yoku 4); 220. "Self-Purification, Self-Constraint" (自淨自縛, Ji kiyoshi Jibaku); 221. "Gain and Loss" (得喪, Tokusō); 222. "Foretokens" (予兆, Yochō); 223. "Inhuman Makyo Shinjuku Showdown, Part 1" (人外魔境新宿決戦 ①, Jingai Makyō Shinjuku Kessen 1); 224. "Inhuman Makyo Shinjuku Showdown, Part 2" (人外魔境新宿決戦 ②, Jingai Makyō Shinjuku Kessen 2); 225. "Inhuman Makyo Shinjuku Showdown, Part 3" (人外魔境新宿決戦 ③, Jingai Makyō Shinjuku Kessen 3); 226. "Inhuman Makyo Shinjuku Showdown, Part 4" (人外魔境新宿決戦 ④, Jingai Makyō Shinjuku Kessen 4); 227. "Inhuman Makyo Shinjuku Showdown, Part 5" (人外魔境新宿決戦 ⑤, Jingai Makyō Shinjuku Kessen 5)
By summoning a now tamed Mahoraga, Sukuna defeats Yorozu while Megumi drowns further into despair. Kenjaku forcefully implements a rule to end the Culling Games upon the deaths of all the players minus him and Sukuna. Hana and Angel manage to survive Sukuna's attack thanks to Amai and Takaba, and with everyone reunited, they successfully open the Prison Realm. A freed Gojo emerges to confront Kenjaku and Sukuna, and they agree to have their final confrontation on December 24th. Each side prepares for the final battle, with Sukuna ingesting all but one of his remaining fingers, and Yuji receiving training for new techniques. On the day of, while Kenjaku goes to track down the remaining Culling Games players, Gojo and Sukuna battle in Shinjuku, with a live feed broadcast by Mei Mei and viewed by the rest of the sorcerers. Gojo and Sukuna fight on near equal ground in terms of strength. During a Domain Expansion clash, Sukuna nearly has the upper-hand, but Gojo's Reversed Cursed Technique lets him heal and regain control. Through increased Domain struggles, Gojo retaliates by creating a tiny Domain that envelops them.
26	Heading South; Minami e (南へ)	April 4, 2024; 978-4-08-883884-7; 978-4-08-908458-8 (limited edition)	May 20, 2025; 978-1-9747-5497-7
228. "Inhuman Makyo Shinjuku Showdown, Part 6" (人外魔境新宿決戦 ⑥, Jingai Makyō Shinjuku Kessen 6); 229. "Inhuman Makyo Shinjuku Showdown, Part 7" (人外魔境新宿決戦 ⑦, Jingai Makyō Shinjuku Kessen 7); 230. "Inhuman Makyo Shinjuku Showdown, Part 8" (人外魔境新宿決戦 ⑧, Jingai Makyō Shinjuku Kessen 8); 231. "Inhuman Makyo Shinjuku Showdown, Part 9" (人外魔境新宿決戦 ⑨, Jingai Makyō Shinjuku Kessen 9); 232. "Inhuman Makyo Shinjuku Showdown, Part 10" (人外魔境新宿決戦 ⑩, Jingai Makyō Shinjuku Kessen 10); 233. "Inhuman Makyo Shinjuku Showdown, Part 11" (人外魔境新宿決戦 ⑪, Jingai Makyō Shinjuku Kessen 11); 234. "Inhuman Makyo Shinjuku Showdown, Part 12" (人外魔境新宿決戦 ⑫, Jingai Makyō Shinjuku Kessen 12); 235. "Inhuman Makyo Shinjuku Showdown, Part 13" (人外魔境新宿決戦 ⑬, Jingai Makyō Shinjuku Kessen 13); 236. "Heading South" (南へ, Minami e)
While the Jujutsu Sorcerers continue to observe and speculate on the events, Gojo wins in the Domain clash against Sukuna. As he once again has the upper hand, Sukuna finally activates the Ten Shadows technique and unleashes Mahoraga. Gojo feels the effects of overusing Domains in his brain, but when Sukuna tries to attack, he receives the same blowback. The two proceed to trade increasingly heavier blows once again, until Mahoraga succeeds in adapting to even his Infinity, dealing a deadly attack to Gojo. Sukuna continues to throw more of the Ten Shadows toward Gojo to prevent him from restoring his fallen output, while the sorcerers debate about joining the fight to support him. However, just as Gojo is proclaimed the victor of the battle and briefly drops his guard, Sukuna executes his ultimate Cleave technique that "cuts the world" to kill Gojo. Gojo reunites with Geto in the afterlife. Meanwhile, Kashimo arrives on the battlefield to take on Sukuna next.
27	Foolish Survivor!! Baka Sabaibā!! (バカサバイバー！！)	July 4, 2024; 978-4-08-884115-1	August 19, 2025; 978-1-9747-5559-2
237. "Inhuman Makyo Shinjuku Showdown, Part 14" (人外魔境新宿決戦 ⑭, Jingai Makyō Shinjuku Kessen 14); 238. "Inhuman Makyo Shinjuku Showdown, Part 15" (人外魔境新宿決戦 ⑮, Jingai Makyō Shinjuku Kessen 15); 239. "Foolish Survivor!!" (バカサバイバー！！, Baka Sabaibā!!); 240. "Live On!!" (バカサバイバー！！〜生き残れ〜, Baka Sabaibā!! ~Ikinokore~); 241. "Win and Remain!!" (バカサバイバー！！〜勝ち残れ〜, Baka Sabaibā!! ~Kachinokore~); 242. "Flying High!!" (バカサバイバー！！〜舞い上がれ〜, Baka Sabaibā!! ~Maiagare~); 243. "Laughing It Up!!" (バカサバイバー！！〜さんざめけ〜, Baka Sabaibā!! ~Sanzameke~); 244. "Inhuman Makyo Shinjuku Showdown, Part 16" (人外魔境新宿決戦 ⑯, Jingai Makyō Shinjuku Kessen 16); 245. "Inhuman Makyo Shinjuku Showdown, Part 17" (人外魔境新宿決戦 ⑰, Jingai Makyō Shinjuku Kessen 17)
While Hakari keeps Uraume busy, Kashimo battles Sukuna using his ultimate lightning technique, as well as questioning Sukuna's idea on what it means to be strong. To heal himself from all the damage he received, Sukuna finishes his incarnation, restoring his true form, and promptly hits Kashimo with a fatal Cleave. Meanwhile, Kenjaku has been entering the other Colonies to take out the remaining Culling Games players, when he is confronted by Takaba, who is unexpectedly able to survive every one of his attacks. Kenjaku figures out the function behind his Comedian Technique, and starts to match Takaba's wits and comedy. Takaba is initially disheartened, but after reflecting upon his own desires, re-engages Kenjaku in a literal laugh riot. Eventually, Kenjaku comes out on top, but the battle distracted him long enough for Yuta to catch him off guard, cutting his head off. Back in Shinjuku, Yuji and Higuruma confront Sukuna next.
28	Inhuman Makyo Shinjuku Showdown: Seimoku; Jingai Makyō Shinjuku Kessen -Hoshime- (人外魔境新宿決戦-星目-)	October 4, 2024; 978-4-08-884211-0	November 4, 2025; 978-1-9747-5890-6
246. "Inhuman Makyo Shinjuku Showdown, Part 18" (人外魔境新宿決戦 ⑱, Jingai Makyō Shinjuku Kessen 18); 247. "Inhuman Makyo Shinjuku Showdown, Part 19" (人外魔境新宿決戦 ⑲, Jingai Makyō Shinjuku Kessen 19); 248. "Inhuman Makyo Shinjuku Showdown, Part 20" (人外魔境新宿決戦 ⑳, Jingai Makyō Shinjuku Kessen 20); 249. "Inhuman Makyo Shinjuku Showdown, Part 21" (人外魔境新宿決戦 ㉑, Jingai Makyō Shinjuku Kessen 21); 250. "Inhuman Makyo Shinjuku Showdown, Part 22" (人外魔境新宿決戦 ㉒, Jingai Makyō Shinjuku Kessen 22); 251. "Inhuman Makyo Shinjuku Showdown, Part 23" (人外魔境新宿決戦 ㉓, Jingai Makyō Shinjuku Kessen 23); 252. "Inhuman Makyo Shinjuku Showdown, Part 24" (人外魔境新宿決戦 ㉔, Jingai Makyō Shinjuku Kessen 24); 253. "Inhuman Makyo Shinjuku Showdown, Part 25" (人外魔境新宿決戦 ㉕, Jingai Makyō Shinjuku Kessen 25); 254. "Inhuman Makyo Shinjuku Showdown, Part 26" (人外魔境新宿決戦 ㉖, Jingai Makyō Shinjuku Kessen 26)
Sukuna himself becomes interested in Higuruma, ultimately Cleaving him. Yuji manages to get ahold of the sword and is about to stab Sukuna, but it disappears just then as Higuruma falls unconscious. Sukuna discovers that Yuji has developed a reverse Cursed Technique himself. Meanwhile, Kenjaku activates his failsafe, sending the remains of Tengen over to Sukuna. After killing Kenjaku for good, and defeating the remaining curse spirits, Yuta arrives to battle Sukuna. Yuta activates his Domain Expansion, revealing many of his Copied Techniques to attack Sukuna with, while Yuji uses his soul punches to attempt to reach out to Megumi. Yuta manages to copy Sukuna's Cleave, reminding him about his remaining finger. Yuta activates Hana's Cursed Technique, allowing Yuji to finally reach out to Megumi, but overly stricken with grief, he does not have the will to live, as Sukuna slashes Yuta and blows back Yuji. Maki then enters the fight while the others recover. Despite being outmatched, Kusakabe uses his Simple Domain to keep him busy, but it is still not enough and he is cut down.
29	Inhuman Makyo Shinjuku Showdown -Life and Death- Jingai Makyō Shinjuku Kessen -Katsushi- (人外魔境新宿決戦-活死-)	December 25, 2024; 978-4-08-884377-3	February 17, 2026; 978-1-9747-6201-9
255. "Inhuman Makyo Shinjuku Showdown, Part 27" (人外魔境新宿決戦 ㉗, Jingai Makyō Shinjuku Kessen 27); 256. "Inhuman Makyo Shinjuku Showdown, Part 28" (人外魔境新宿決戦 ㉘, Jingai Makyō Shinjuku Kessen 28); 257. "Inhuman Makyo Shinjuku Showdown, Part 29" (人外魔境新宿決戦 ㉙, Jingai Makyō Shinjuku Kessen 29); 258. "Inhuman Makyo Shinjuku Showdown, Part 30" (人外魔境新宿決戦 ㉚, Jingai Makyō Shinjuku Kessen 30); 259. "Inhuman Makyo Shinjuku Showdown, Part 31" (人外魔境新宿決戦 ㉛, Jingai Makyō Shinjuku Kessen 31); 260. "Inhuman Makyo Shinjuku Showdown, Part 32" (人外魔境新宿決戦 ㉜, Jingai Makyō Shinjuku Kessen 32); 261. "Inhuman Makyo Shinjuku Showdown, Part 33" (人外魔境新宿決戦 ㉝, Jingai Makyō Shinjuku Kessen 33); 262. "Inhuman Makyo Shinjuku Showdown, Part 34" (人外魔境新宿決戦 ㉞, Jingai Makyō Shinjuku Kessen 34) (Note: The chapter was split into two parts published non-consecutively in Weekly Shōnen Jump.); 263. "Inhuman Makyo Shinjuku Showdown, Part 35" (人外魔境新宿決戦 ㉟, Jingai Makyō Shinjuku Kessen 35)
Miguel and Larue, sorcerers formerly allied with Geto, briefly confront Sukuna and retreat before they can be harmed. Yuji, Choso, and Maki continue to fight Sukuna, and Yuji manages to strike him with a Black Flash and awakens his full potential. In a flashback, Sukuna reveals to Uraume how Yuji is actually Kenjaku's son, and that his father, Jin Itadori, is the reincarnation of his twin brother, whom he ate in his mother's womb. However, Sukuna takes the upperhand with Choso sacrificing his life for Yuji, while Todo arrives on the battlefield. Todo and Yuji battle Sukuna, but before he can use another Domain Expansion, he is stopped by an apparently revived Gojo. This is revealed to be Yuta, who used Kenjaku's technique to switch bodies with Gojo. Yuta resumes the fight against Sukuna, and with Inumaki's help, he manages to land a hit on Sukuna, before collapsing. Yuji and Todo resume the fight, where Sukuna realizes that Yuji's strikes are weakening his control over Megumi's body, with Hana joining the battlefield.
30	From Now On; Kore Kara (これから)	December 25, 2024; 978-4-08-884378-0	May 12, 2026; 978-1-9747-6340-5
264. "Inhuman Makyo Shinjuku Showdown, Part 36" (人外魔境新宿決戦 ㊱, Jingai Makyō Shinjuku Kessen 36); 265. "That Day" (あの日, Ano Hi); 266. "Inhuman Makyo Shinjuku Showdown, Part 37" (人外魔境新宿決戦 ㊲, Jingai Makyō Shinjuku Kessen 37); 267. "Inhuman Makyo Shinjuku Showdown, Part 38" (人外魔境新宿決戦 ㊳, Jingai Makyō Shinjuku Kessen 38); 268. "Settling Matters" (決着, Ketchaku); 269. "Considerations" (検討, Kentō); 270. "The End of the Dream" (夢の終わリ, Yume no Owari); 271. "From Now On" (これから, Kore Kara); "Epilogue" (エピローグ, Epirōgu)
Sukuna tries to hit Hana with a Black Flash, but Todo blocks it, disabling both. Sukuna resumes fighting Yuji, but the latter manages to trap him in his own Domain Expansion. Yuji and Sukuna continue to fight inside the Domain and, despite Sukuna being hindered inside by Megumi, he manages to restore his Cursed Energy. Just before activating his Domain however, Sukuna is hit by an alive Nobara's Resonance on his last finger, which Gojo had hidden, allowing Yuji to cut the border that separates Megumi's soul from his and separate the two. Sukuna disintegrates despite Yuji's mercy. Elsewhere, Uraume senses Sukuna's defeat and lets themselves die, seeing no meaning in life anymore. At the institute, Megumi awakens and reunites with Yuji and Nobara. The three then meet Yuta, who has returned to his body, and the rest of the surviving sorcerers (including Higuruma), taking stock of the situation. The sorcerers use Tengen's remains to stabilize his barriers, while the Culling Game players return to their normal lives. Yuji remembers Gojo expressing his hopes in him while undergoing a mission. Sukuna's soul meets Mahito's soul in limbo, and tells him that if he ever gets a chance at life again, he will choose a different path, disappointing the cursed spirit. Sukuna's last finger is shown lying back in the tool shed of Yuji's old school.
