= Yuji Itadori =

Fictional character from Jujutsu Kaisen

- Jujutsu Kaisen character
- Yuji Itadori as drawn by Gege Akutami
- First appearance: Jujutsu Kaisen #1, "Ryomen Sukuna" (2018)
- Created by: Gege Akutami
- Voiced by: Japanese: Junya Enoki; English: Adam McArthur

In-universe information
- Occupation: Student at Tokyo Jujutsu High
- Family: Wasuke Itadori (grandfather); Jin Itadori (father); Kenjaku (mother); Kaori Itadori (Kenjaku's vessel); Choso, Eso, Kechizu, Noranso, Sho-oso, Tanso, Sanso, Kotsuso, and Shoso (elder half-brothers); Ryomen Sukuna (great-uncle)
- Nationality: Japanese

Yuji Itadori (Japanese: 虎杖 悠仁, Hepburn: Itadori Yūji) is a fictional character and the protagonist of the manga series Jujutsu Kaisen, created by Gege Akutami. Yuji is a first-year Jujutsu Sorcerer at Tokyo Jujutsu High who is thrown into the world of sorcery after he ate a Cursed Object: a finger belonging to Ryomen Sukuna, a powerful sorcerer from the Heian period of Japan. With his classmates, Yuji exorcises Curses while trying to honor his grandfather's legacy and save others unconditionally so that when he is executed after eating all twenty fingers, he will not be alone in his death.

The character was created by Gege Akutami after writing Jujutsu Kaisen 0. Like its protagonist, Yuji was influenced by Naruto manga protagonist Naruto Uzumaki as well as Bleach protagonist Ichigo Kurosaki. He was written to be an active character.

In the anime adaptation of the manga, Yuji is voiced by Junya Enoki in Japanese and Adam McArthur in English. The character has been received positively by critics, with many praising his character development though some critics were divided if he is a proper unique shōnen protagonist.

== Concept ==
Yuji was created by Gege Akutami. His first name, Yuji, translates to "abundant, help, and brave" with the individual syllables "yu" translating to slow or relaxing and "ji" to "caring for others". His family name, Itadori, comes from Japanese knotweed (Fallopia japonica), which is used in traditional medicine to take away pain, representing Yuji's caring interior. Akutami has stated if he were to identify Yuji's theme music it would be "Heart ni Hi wo Tsukete" by 9mm Parabellum Bullet and "Itsuka Dokoka De" by Kuchiroro, songs that combine heavy metal with chill jazz. Inspired by Masashi Kishimoto's manga series Naruto, Yuta Okkotsu and the Curse of Rika were influenced by the protagonist Naruto Uzumaki who lives with a nine-tailed demon fox inside his body and both would become allies when joining forces. While Yuta would also make peace with the curse of Rika who keeps torturing the character throughout Jujutsu Kaisen 0, he aimed to make a different dynamic in his next work Jujutsu Kaisen when developing the protagonist Yuji be constantly mocked and victimized by the antagonist Ryomen Sukuna. Yuji's characterization was also inspired by Ichigo Kurosaki, the protagonist of Tite Kubo's manga Bleach.

Yuji's appearance wearing a hoodie was, in Akutami's eyes, meant to symbolize his hesitancy and indecisiveness. According to Akutami in 2021, the end of Yuji's character arc had been planned in advance with it set to finish within two years, though Sukuna's finale was up in air. He also debunked popular fan theories that Yuji's mother was Yuki Tsukumo.

Yuji has been described as "being naïve, thoughtful, and adorable, all while being possessed by an ancient evil." The viscerality of his character mixed with his outgoing traits are contrasted throughout his arc. As Akutami never intended for his series to be serialized, Jujutsu Kaisen 0 main protagonist Yuta was originally intended to be the main protagonist of the franchise. Similarities between the two characters include their introduction into the world of jujutsu, tragedy, naivety and having become faced with death. Despite their similarities, the two have been differentiated with notability given to how "they carry themselves very differently...Itadori is outgoing, where Yuta is more reserved." In regards to his age, while Yuji is a teenager, early in the series he mentions he has been playing pachinko. Akutami was concerned about this scene due to the manga's young demographic, shonen manga, but ultimately left this mention uncensored. In the finale of the anime's second season, Yuji was given a new scene not present in the manga where he performs an ippon-jime, a Japanese sign of moving the hands in symbolism of the series continuing.

=== Casting ===
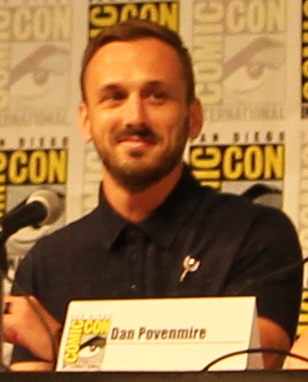
Adam McArthur provided the English voice for Yuji Itadori.

Junya Enoki is Yuji's Japanese actor. He relates having problems understanding the character, believing Yuji to be a more complex character than those he associates in other works despite his apparently typical traits. He associated him with Megumi Fushiguro due to the mysteries they share. Enoki had no problems deciding the appropriate pitch for Yuji, something he discussed with the director. The actor further addressed that Yuji is straightforward, and he also comes across as intelligent due to how he analyses fights. Despite seeing Yuji as a standard Shonen Jump protagonist, Enoki had fun voicing him, noting that the character had several types of emotions he had to explore. For the second season, Enoki cited Yuji's mental breakdown upon seeing Sukuna's chaos as important as he had to yell as the character did while crying and throwing up. While Enoki did not throw up, he did accidentally start crying during the recording of this scene. The director praised Enoki's performance for making Enoki give the anime a bigger sense of realism.

Yuji Itadori is Adam McArthur's first work in dubbing anime, something he wanted to do ever since he was a child. He heard of the anime series from a friend and got help from one of his agents to audition for the role. The first episode's scene involving Yuji's grandfather's last words at death gave him an idea about how to portray the character. Since his grandfather wanted Yuji to help others, McArthur believed that Yuji is a teenager who likes helping people in need. McArthur used his experience of voice acting classes in the most serious scenes. Following the dub of the series, McArthur looks forward to his next work as Yuji.

== Appearances ==
=== Jujutsu Kaisen ===
Yuji first appears in Jujutsu Kaisen as an eccentric 15-year-old who lives with his grandfather, Wasuke, and is a member of his high school's Occult Club. On the day of his grandfather's death, Yuji is approached by first-year Jujutsu Sorcerer Megumi Fushiguro, who inquires about one of Sukuna's fingers that the Occult Club illicitly obtained. He comes to Megumi's rescue when a swarm of Cursed Spirits attacks the school, attracted by the finger. Yuji ingests the finger and becomes Sukuna's host. Jujutsu master and teacher at the Tokyo school, Satoru Gojo, tells Yuji that he is intended for execution, but it is delayed so that the world can be rid of Sukuna when Yuji eats all of Sukuna's fingers. Yuji moves into the school and is mentored in Jujutsu personally by Satoru. He quickly strikes up a friendship with his fellow first-years, Megumi and Nobara Kugisaki. He dies during an altercation with a "Cursed Womb" at a detention facility, wherein Sukuna blackmails Yuji by holding his heart hostage, but is later brought back to life by Sukuna.

Presumed dead, Yuji continues to work with his sorcery, uncovering his massive Cursed Energy and using it for specialized cursed purposes. He strikes up a quick friendship with Junpei, which is derailed when he is killed by the Cursed Spirit Mahito. He also meets the 9 to 5 sorcerer and former salaryman Kento Nanami. After a fight that Mahito loses but escapes, Yuji swears revenge. At the exhibition between the Tokyo and Kyoto Jujutsu schools, Yuji reveals to the world he has survived. Some want him dead immediately, while others side with Gojo to keep him alive temporarily. He strikes up a quick brotherly relationship with Kyoto's third-year Aoi Todo. Alongside Todo, he and the other Jujutsu students and staff repel an invasion of the school by Mahito(a disaster-grade curse) and Hanami(another disaster-grade curse), a Cursed Spirit who is environmentally conscious. During the battle, he uses several consecutive punches called "Black Flash", a distortion in space that significantly empowers his Cursed Techniques. By the end of the battle, he and Todo are able to fight off Hanami long enough for Gojo to defeat the Curse. Later, Yuji is assigned to a mission where he comes across two brothers who are both Cursed Wombs: Death Painting, hybrids of a Cursed Spirit and a human. He and Nobara kill them, though Yuji expresses regret when he realizes they have physical bodies and that he disrupted their tight-knit brotherly bond.

Yuji is sent to Shibuya when Mahito and the Cursed Spirits lay one final siege on the Jujutsu Sorcerers of Japan. Following his defeat at Death Painting Choso's hands, Sukuna possesses him and destroys the area. A horrified Yuji tries to fight Mahito until Todo brings him aid. The sorcerer Kenjaku is revealed to be the creator of Yuji and Choso, much to their shock. After Kenjaku unleashes thousands of Cursed Spirits and newly awakened Jujutsu Sorcerers onto the world, Yuji tries to escape from the academy. Executioner Yuta Okkotsu fakes his death to protect him from their superiors. After the Shibuya incident, Megumi joins him and other sorcerers to participate in Kenjaku's Culling Games. After several battles, Gojo is unsealed and reunites with his students as he prepares to fight Sukuna, but Gojo dies fighting him, as Sukuna has taken over Megumi. Following Gojo's death, Yuji and the sorcerers try to defeat Sukuna together, suffering several wounds. It is also revealed that Kenjaku is his "mother," Kaori Itadori; he took over her body and created him by reproducing with Jin Itadori. This heritage is revealed to be the true reason behind Yuji's high Cursed Energy. After awakening his hidden potential, Yuji is able to defeat Sukuna. In the epilogue, Yuji reunites with his schoolmates.

In the light novel, set during Yuji's time in hiding and secret training after being declared dead, he encounters Minato in a park. The boy unknowingly manifested a Cursed Spirit that appeared in front of his adoptive parents' home at night. Yuji ultimately defeats it after a lesson from Gojo.

=== Jujutsu Kaisen Modulo ===
By 2087, Yuji's powers have greatly increased, being able to use the Blood Manipulation and Shrine techniques to exponentially higher levels than any other past users, effortlessly landing Black Flashes, and is officially recognized as a legendary figure among Jujutsu Society, succeeding Gojo as the strongest. However, his physical aging has slowed exponentially due to consuming the Death Painting Wombs, having remained youthful decades since Sukuna's defeat. Due to constantly watching his peers pass away, the guilt that Yuji suffered due to his physiology led to him going into hiding.

During the events of Jujutsu Kaisen Modulo, Jujutsu Headquarters has constantly made attempts to locate Yuji after the arrival of the Simurians, wanting to use him as a deterrent in the face of potential aggression. When Yuji still doesn't appear after conflict arises between Japan and the refugees, Jujutsu Headquarters is forced to enlist Yuta's granddaughter Yuka Okkotsu in a duel against Dabura Karaba, the Simurian's strongest fighter. When a group of humans and Simurians nearly battle after finding each other in the ruins of Tokyo, Yuji finally reveals himself, neutralizing both sides of the conflict to ensure that their actions do not interrupt the course of the duel occurring.

Later on, Maru, a Simurian refugee, contacted Yuji, informing him of his plan to conduct a ritual to rid the world of cursed spirits; a plan that Yuji had given up on long ago. After visiting the pathway of souls, encountering his old nemesis Mahito and defeating him easily in the process, both sorcerers enact the ritual, with Yuji informing Maru to pin the blame on him to prevent prejudice against Simurians. He then visits Nobara, where he discusses with her his changed perspective on Gojo's wish for him and setting up countermeasures against any potential dangers that may come following the loss of cursed energy.

== Reception ==
=== Popularity ===
Yuji was the number one fan-favorite Jujutsu Kaisen character on MyAnimeList (MAL) as of June 2021. In a Viz Media popularity poll taken in March 2021, he was voted the second-most popular character in the franchise after Satoru Gojo. At the 6th Crunchyroll Anime Awards in 2022, he was nominated for "Best Protagonist" and won "Best Fight Scene" for his battle with Aoi Todo against Hanami. He was also nominated in the same category for his battle with Nobara Kugisaki fighting against Eso and Kechizu. Adam McArthur was one of the nominees for Best Voice Artist Performance (English) for his performance as Yuji. In May 2022, manga author Kenta Shinohara did his own tribute to the character of Yuji alongside Yuta and Megumi.

=== Critical response ===
Critical reception of Yuji's character has been positive. Chingy Nea of Polygon initially described him as a typical shōnen hero, comparing his earnest and goofy nature to Naruto Uzumaki and his self-sacrificing personality to Izuku Midoriya from My Hero Academia. However, Nea noted that unlike the archetypal protagonist who changes the world, Yuji's narrative is shaped by Jujutsu Kaisen's attempt to reconcile shōnen ideals with the harsh realities of modern life. This context renders Yuji a more complex figure, who is horrified by his new world and fears death, yet remains uncorrupted by cynicism and persists in helping others despite his pain. Multiple critics drew parallels between Yuji and Ichigo Kurosaki from Bleach, noting their shared premise of a young man acquiring supernatural powers and an internal evil entity to protect people from monsters.

Karen Lu of Yale University highlighted Yuji's subversion of the stubborn young male anime protagonist trope, observing that he quickly understands he cannot save everyone. She commended the series for demonstrating that his strength requires genuine suffering, finding this dynamic both inspiring and sobering. Other reviewers praised his willingness to assume great responsibility and sacrifice his safety for friends, as well as the fun energy of his interactions. Eric Thomas of Discussing Film lauded the anime's expanded introductory scenes with Yuji's grandfather for adding crucial emotional depth to his development, and praised the performance of his voice actor.

The release of the prequel Jujutsu Kaisen 0 prompted critics to compare Yuji to its protagonist, Yuta Okkotsu. Debates emerged over which character was more relatable or original, given their different characterizations despite similar narrative roles. Otaquest retrospectively criticized Yuji as overly simplistic next to Yuta, reinforcing his similarity to Ichigo Kurosaki. In reviews of the second season, Anime News Network and IGN found Yuji's role weakened by an ensemble narrative where supporting characters sustained severe injuries or death while he fought. Anime News Network also criticized the fates of Nanami and Nobara as bordering on the "women in refrigerators" trope for the primary purpose of shocking Yuji.

Nijimen found Yuji's team-up with Yuta against Sukuna engaging due to their shared protagonist status, though expressed concern that Sukuna might kill them as he had other fighters like Gojo. The revelation that Yuji was related to Sukuna created new potential for his ability to defeat the king of curses. Screen Rant praised Sukuna's eventual defeat for concluding the extended Shinjuku Showdown arc without further prolonging it through new transformations. Yuji's display of both mercy and violence toward Sukuna in the finale elicited mixed reactions from Screen Rant regarding the protagonist's conflicted feelings. Game Rant concluded that Yuji did not stand out as a main character, arguing that he was overshadowed by Gojo and that Yuta had a more notable character arc, with the main trio's potential ultimately being wasted in favour of side characters.
