= Jujutsu Kaisen =

Japanese manga series

- First tankōbon volume cover, featuring Yuji Itadori

呪術廻戦
- Genre: Adventure; Dark fantasy; Supernatural
- Manga
- Written by: Gege Akutami
- Published by: Shueisha
- English publisher: NA: Viz Media
- Imprint: Jump Comics
- Magazine: Weekly Shōnen Jump
- English magazine: NA: Weekly Shonen Jump
- Original run: March 5, 2018 – September 30, 2024
- Volumes: 30
- Anime television series
- Jujutsu Kaisen (2020–present)
- Video games
- Cursed Clash (2024)
- Preceded by
- Jujutsu Kaisen 0 (2017); Anime film (2021)
- Followed by
- Jujutsu Kaisen Modulo (2025–2026)
- icon

Jujutsu Kaisen (呪術廻戦; rgh. 'Sorcery Battle' (Note: Jujutsu (呪術) translates as 'sorcery', while Kaisen is a coined word by the author, combining two kanji; kai (廻; 'to rotate') and sen (戦; 'battle').)) is a Japanese manga series written and illustrated by Gege Akutami. It was serialized in Shueisha's shōnen manga magazine Weekly Shōnen Jump from March 2018 to September 2024, with its chapters collected in 30 tankōbon volumes. The story follows high school student Yuji Itadori as he joins a secret organization of Jujutsu Sorcerers to eliminate a powerful Curse named Ryomen Sukuna, of whom Yuji becomes the host. Jujutsu Kaisen is a sequel to Akutami's previous work, Tokyo Metropolitan Curse Technical School, which was retroactively titled Jujutsu Kaisen 0 following the release of Jujutsu Kaisen.

Jujutsu Kaisen is licensed for an English-language release in North America by Viz Media, which has published the manga in print since December 2019. Shueisha has published the series digitally in English on its Manga Plus platform. Two novels, written by Ballad Kitaguni, were published in May 2019 and January 2020, respectively. An anime television series adaptation, produced by MAPPA, aired its first season on MBS from October 2020 to March 2021. A second season aired from July to December 2023. A third season aired from January to March 2026. A fourth season has been announced. A short-term spin-off sequel manga series written by Akutami and illustrated by manga artist Yūji Iwasaki, titled Jujutsu Kaisen Modulo, ran in Weekly Shōnen Jump from September 2025 to March 2026.

By December 2025, the Jujutsu Kaisen manga had over 150 million copies in circulation, including related novels, digital versions, and Jujutsu Kaisen 0, making it one of the best-selling manga series of all time.

== Synopsis ==
=== Setting ===
In Jujutsu Kaisen, all living beings emanate a power source known as Cursed Energy (呪力, Juryoku), which arises from negative emotions that naturally flow throughout the body. Most people cannot control this energy, and as a result, continually release it. The accumulation of uncontrolled Cursed Energy gives rise to Curses (呪い, Noroi), malevolent spiritual entities driven to harm humanity. These Curses often manifest as grotesque monsters, drawing on traditional Japanese folklore, such as onryō (vengeful spirits), yūrei (ghosts), and yōkai.

Jujutsu Sorcerers (呪術師, Jujutsushi; lit. 'Cursed Technique Masters' or 'Sorcerer') are individuals capable of controlling the flow of Cursed Energy within themselves, allowing them to use it, granting them inhuman abilities and minimizing its passive release. High-ranking Sorcerers and powerful Curses can refine this energy to perform Cursed Techniques (呪術式, Jujutsushiki), specialized abilities that are often unique to the individual or inherited through familial bloodlines. The pinnacle of Jujutsu Sorcery is the Domain Expansion (領域展開, Ryōiki Tenkai), an advanced barrier technique. Most of the time, the Domain forms a sealed area that traps the target inside, enhancing the user's abilities and ensuring their techniques will hit. A rare type of a Domain does not form a sealed area, but it greatly increases its range. Additionally, some individuals are born with a Heavenly Restriction (天与呪縛, Ten'yo Jubaku), a divine binding vow imposed at birth that trades physical health for an extreme enhancement of physical capability and Cursed Energy level.

Sorcerers are governed by the Jujutsu Society, a secretive and hierarchical organization tasked with protecting non-sorcerers from Curses and managing the battles against them within Japan. Its central governing body, the Jujutsu Headquarters, is led by the Jujutsu Commander, appointed by the Prime Minister upon nomination by the three major sorcerer families: the Gojo, Zen'in, and Kamo clans. It operates educational institutions such as the Tokyo and Kyoto Jujutsu High Schools, which train new generations of sorcerers. These schools are directly controlled by the Jujutsu Headquarters, and their principals are appointed based on recommendations from the major clans. Despite its noble mission, the Jujutsu Society faces criticism for its strict adherence to tradition and the disproportionate influence of elite sorcerer clans, leading to several internal conflicts and controversial decisions.

=== Plot ===
Yuji Itadori is a high school student with unnatural physical strength and athletic ability. One day, at school, his friends attract Curses by unsealing a rotten finger talisman. Yuji swallows the finger to protect Jujutsu Sorcerer student Megumi Fushiguro, tasked with retrieving the finger, unwittingly becoming host to the powerful ancient sorcerer Ryomen Sukuna. The leaders of the Jujutsu Society intend to exorcise Sukuna, and Yuji, by extension. However, noticing Yuji's capability to retain control over his body, Satoru Gojo, the strongest sorcerer in the modern Jujutsu world—brings him to the Tokyo Prefectural Jujutsu High School for training. Gojo has Yuji's execution postponed until he consumes all twenty of Sukuna's fingers, thereby enabling Sukuna's complete destruction through his death.

Meanwhile, a group of intelligent Cursed Spirits plot an elaborate attack to reform Jujutsu according to their ideals. The group is led by Suguru Geto, a mysterious sorcerer and Curse User believed to have been killed by Gojo a year earlier, whose entourage includes the soul-manipulating Curse, Mahito; the fire Curse, Jogo; and the nature Curse, Hanami. Yuji is devastated after Mahito kills his friend Junpei Yoshino, but is unable to take revenge. Mahito infiltrates Tokyo Jujutsu High and steals three "Death Paintings"—dormant, half-human, half-Curses—before summoning them to their full form. During a battle, two of them end up being exorcised, leaving Choso as the sole Death Painting survivor.

On Halloween night in Shibuya, Gojo destroys Hanami, but is ultimately sealed by Geto, revealed to be the ancient sorcerer, Kenjaku, inhabiting Geto's corpse. Choso defeats Yuji, but spares his life after having a vision that reveals they are brothers. Subsequently, Jogo force-feeds an unconscious Yuji ten Sukuna fingers, enabling Sukuna to briefly take control. Sukuna kills Jogo and nearly destroys all of Shibuya in the process. He then hands control back to Yuji, who is overwhelmed by the sight. With help from Kyoto Jujutsu High student Aoi Todo, Yuji defeats Mahito, but Kenjaku absorbs the Curses and awakens countless sorcerers, advancing his millennia-old plan for a new era of Cursed Spirits.

In the aftermath, the Jujutsu higher-ups reinstate Yuji's immediate execution and appoint second-year student Yuta Okkotsu, who instead helps Yuji. They group together with other sorcerers to seek Master Tengen—an immortal, part-Curse, part-human sorcerer. Tengen reveals Kenjaku's plan to merge the former's consciousness with the entire Japanese population through the "Culling Games"—a battle royal among the awakened sorcerers, designed to accumulate vast amounts of Cursed Energy. Eventually, Tengen is captured by Kenjaku. Yuji and his allies rescue Megumi's stepsister, Tsumiki, from being forced into the Culling Games; however, she is killed by Sukuna after he takes control of Megumi's body.

A month later, the unsealed Gojo battles Sukuna, who fatally bisects him. Meanwhile, Yuta defeats Kenjaku, who, before dying, makes Sukuna the Culling Games' master. The remaining Jujutsu Sorcerers attempt to fight Sukuna, but are overpowered as he regains his true form. In a flashback, it is revealed that Sukuna ate his twin brother in the womb a thousand years ago. The twin's soul reincarnated into Yuji's lineage, and Kenjaku's possession of Yuji's mother during conception combined to forge his unique physique and his capacity to host Sukuna. With help from his allies, Yuji manages to defeat Sukuna, although Choso sacrifices himself in the process. Megumi successfully frees himself from Sukuna, who subsequently disintegrates. Some time after the battle, Yuji reflects on Gojo's hopes and trust in him, and although Sukuna's last finger is shown, his defeat makes his return unlikely.

== Production ==
=== Development ===
Manga author Gege Akutami first published Tokyo Metropolitan Curse Technical School, a four-chapter series that ran in Jump Giga from April 28 to July 28, 2017. The series would later serve as a prologue to Jujutsu Kaisen and was retitled as Jujutsu Kaisen 0. According to Hiroyuki Nakano, the chief editor of Weekly Shōnen Jump, Jujutsu Kaisen received unanimous approval from the serialization committee. It debuted in Weekly Shōnen Jump on March 5, 2018.

=== Influences ===
Akutami stated that Neon Genesis Evangelion influenced the mythological aspects of the series, and was also influenced by horror and found footage films. Akutami is particularly a fan of Yoshihiro Togashi, author of YuYu Hakusho and Hunter × Hunter, expressing intentions to have an art style as close as possible to his. The author is also a fan of Tite Kubo, author of Bleach, and discussed in an interview with him the similarities between their works. Other manga artists who influenced Akutami include Masashi Kishimoto (Naruto) and Yusuke Murata (Eyeshield 21 and One-Punch Man illustrator).

The magic system of Jujutsu Kaisen is largely inspired by Hunter × Hunter, whose fights, in Akutami's words, "rejects emotional arguments", stating however, that like Daisuke Ashihara, World Trigger's author, whose magic system is also similar to Togashi's series, Akutami was trying to find and develop an own style. For the first Jujutsu Kaisen chapter, Akutami used the first chapter of Bleach as an off-point, and considered a twist on Naruto's Nine-Tails by using someone "incompatible" to generate an interesting dynamic. That approach resulted in the creation of Ryomen Sukuna.

=== Conclusion ===
In October 2020, Akutami stated that the story's ending and main stages were planned, but that the path between the two remained "fairly free." In February 2021, Akutami stated that the series would probably be finished within two years, declaring, however, no confidence in that statement. Akutami knew how the story for Megumi Fushiguro would end, but not for Sukuna. On June 9, 2021, it was announced that the manga would enter a hiatus due to the author's health issues; it resumed publication on August 2 of the same year. In December 2022, Akutami hinted that the manga would end within a year, stating during the Jump Festa '23 event: "If you accompany me for up to one more year (probably), I will be very happy." In December 2023, at the Jump Festa '24 event, Akutami stated in a handwritten comment that it would probably be the last Jump Festa in which the series would continue in serialization, hinting that it would end within 2024; the series concluded on September 30 of said year.

== Media ==
=== Manga ===
Written and illustrated by Gege Akutami, Jujutsu Kaisen was serialized in Shueisha's Weekly Shōnen Jump magazine from March 5, 2018, to September 30, 2024. Its chapters were collected and published by Shueisha into 30 individual tankōbon volumes, released from July 4, 2018, to December 25, 2024; the final volume includes 16 pages of four epilogues newly drawn for the manga, focused on characters Yūko Ozawa, Uraume, Nobara Kugisaki, and Panda.

Shueisha began to simultaneously publish the series in English on the app and website Manga Plus in January 2019. Viz Media published the first three chapters for its "Jump Start" initiative. In March 2019, Viz Media announced the print release of the series in North America. The 30 volumes were released from December 3, 2019, to May 12, 2026.

Akutami and manga artist Yūji Iwasaki created the short-term manga series Jujutsu Kaisen Modulo, which ran in Weekly Shōnen Jump from September 8, 2025, to March 9, 2026.

=== Novels ===
Two novels written by Ballad Kitaguni have been released under the Jump J-Books imprint. The first, Jujutsu Kaisen: Summer of Ashes, Autumn of Dust (呪術廻戦 逝く夏と還る秋, Jujutsu Kaisen Iku Natsu to Kaeru Aki), was released on May 1, 2019. The second novel, Jujutsu Kaisen: Thorny Road at Dawn (呪術廻戦 夜明けのいばら道, Jujutsu Kaisen: Yoake no Ibara Michi), was released on January 4, 2020. In February 2022, Viz Media announced that it had licensed the novels for an English-language release. Jujutsu Kaisen: Summer of Ashes, Autumn of Dust was released on December 27, 2022, and Jujutsu Kaisen: Thorny Road at Dawn was released on April 25, 2023. In September 2025, it was announced that writer Yumeaki Hirayama will pen a spin-off novel for the franchise.

=== Anime ===
A 24-episode first season of an anime television series adaptation produced by MAPPA was broadcast on MBS's Super Animeism block and TBS from October 3, 2020, to March 27, 2021. (Note: MBS listed the air dates for the series on Friday at 25:25, which is effectively Saturday at 1:25 a.m. JST.) A prequel film, Jujutsu Kaisen 0, premiered in Japanese theaters on December 24, 2021.

A second 23-episode season, titled Hidden Inventory / Premature Death (episodes 1–5) and Shibuya Incident (episodes 6–23), aired from July 6 to December 28, 2023.

A third 12-episode season, titled The Culling Game: Part 1, aired from January 9 to March 27, 2026. (Note: MBS listed the air dates for the season on Thursday at 24:26, which is effectively Friday at 12:26 a.m. JST.)

Following the third season's finale, a fourth season, titled, The Culling Game: Part 2 (死滅回游 後編, Shimetsu Kaiyū: Kōhen), was announced.

=== Video games ===
In June 2021, a free-to-play role-playing mobile game, titled Jujutsu Kaisen: Phantom Parade, developed by Sumzap, was announced. The game was set to be released in 2022; however, it was delayed to November 21, 2023. The game was released internationally on November 7, 2024.

A collaboration with PlayerUnknown's Battlegrounds (PUBG Mobile) was announced in August 2021. The collaboration was made available globally, except in Japan and mainland China, from February 15 to March 15, 2022.

A fighting video game, titled Jujutsu Kaisen: Cursed Clash, developed by Byking and Gemdrops, and published by Bandai Namco Entertainment, was announced in July 2023. It was released on February 2, 2024, on Nintendo Switch, PlayStation 4, PlayStation 5, Windows (via Steam), Xbox One and Xbox Series X|S.

The outfits from Yuji Itadori, Satoru Gojo, Megumi Fushiguro, and Nobara Kugisaki were released as cosmetic items in Mobile Legends: Bang Bang on February 18, 2023, and Fortnite on August 8 of that same year. In a limited-time collaboration with Honor of Kings, Yuji and Satoru outfits became available on November 1, 2024, alongside other thematic elements based on the series, such as a new enchanted battlefield, login screen, ranking list, and loading screens.

On June 9, 2026, during the Nintendo Direct livestream, Shueisha Games announced a video game developed by Poncle titled Jujutsu Kaisen Rumble: Survivaton. It is set to release for the Nintendo Switch 2, PlayStation 5, Xbox Series X|S, and Windows (via Steam). It was originally announced to be released in 2026; however, it was later announced that it would be delayed to 2027.

=== Stage plays ===
A stage play adaptation of the manga was announced at the Jump Festa '22 event in December 2021. It ran at The Galaxy Theatre in Tokyo's Tennōzu from July 15–31, and scheduled to run at the Mielparque Hall Osaka from August 4–14, 2022; however, due to an actor's injury, the stage play in Osaka was delayed and started on August 7. The play was directed by Kensaku Kobayashi and written by Kōhei Kiyasu. The cast included Ryūji Satō as Yuji Itadori, Kazuaki Yasue as Megumi Fushiguro, Erika Toyohara as Nobara Kugisaki, Sara Takatsuki as Maki Zen'in, Fūma Sadamoto as Toge Inumaki, and Takeshi Terayama as Panda.

A second stage play based on the manga's "Kyoto Goodwill Event" and "The Origin of Blind Obedience" story arcs, ran at The Galaxy Theater in Tokyo from December 15–31, 2023, and at AiiA 2.5 Theater Kobe in Hyogo from January 6–14, 2024. The cast and staff returned to reprise their roles, with Nonoka Yamaguchi replacing Erika Toyohara as Nobara Kugisaki.

A stage play based on the manga's "Hidden Inventory/Premature Death" story arc, ran in Tokyo from August 22–31, and Osaka from September 5–7, 2025. A stage play based on "Shibuya Incident" arc, is set to run in Tokyo from November 14–23, and Osaka from November 28–29, 2026.

=== Other media ===
A fanbook, titled Jujutsu Kaisen: The Official Character Guide (呪術廻戦 公式ファンブック, Jujutsu Kaisen Kōshiki Fanbukku; lit. 'Jujutsu Kaisen Official Fanbook'), was published by Shueisha on March 4, 2021. It features exclusive information about the series, character profiles, author commentaries, an interview, and a special dialogue between Akutami and Bleach author Tite Kubo. In June 2023, Viz Media announced its acquisition, and released it on April 23, 2024.

From September 16, 2022, to July 2, 2023, Universal Studios Japan hosted attractions based on Jujutsu Kaisen. These included "Jujutsu Kaisen the Real 4-D," an approximately 20-minute original animation enhanced with 4D effects like water sprays and moving seats, and a roller coaster, "Jujutsu Kaisen × Hollywood Dream – The Ride (Kaikai Kitan)", which operated until January 18, 2023. The coaster featured an onboard sound system that allowed riders to select their own music. Separately, Universal Studios Hollywood opened the Jujutsu Kaisen: Hunger of the Cursed attraction from April 25 to May 18, 2025, as part of its Fan Fest Nights event.

In October 2022, Crunchyroll and BoxLunch announced a merchandise collaboration, setting up photo spots for Jujujutu Kaisen and My Hero Academia in select stores in the United States. Fans could take pictures through select locations, featuring an additional installation with characters of the series. The BoxLunch stores also hosted a lottery with an exclusive meet-and-greet event with the Jujutsu Kaisen voice actors as the prize.

An art exhibition, to celebrate the sixth anniversary of the series, ran at the Hikarie Hall in Shibuya from July 6 to August 27, 2024. The exhibition was held at the Grand Front Osaka in Osaka from April 19 to June 8, 2025, Fukuoka from July 12 to September 28 in the same year, Sendai from February 14 to March 29, 2026, Nagoya from July 4 to August 30, and Iwate from September 12 to November 8 of the same year. It is set to be held in Shinjuku as its final exhibition from December 25, 2026, to January 25, 2027. An animation exhibition, in celebration of the anime's fifth anniversary, was held at the Ikebukuro Sunshine City in Tokyo from December 5–29, 2025, with various cities also set to host from March 2026 to January 2027.

On July 9, 2024, McDonald's released a limited-edition Special Grade Garlic Sauce, available exclusively through its mobile app, in collaboration with the Jujutsu Kaisen franchise, and eight different characters from the series were printed on the lid of each dipping sauce container, including Yuji Itadori, Megumi Fushiguro, Nobara Kugisaki, Satoru Gojo, Kento Nanami, Suguru Geto, Mahito, and Ryomen Sukuna. Each purchase of the dipping sauce also came with a 30-day free trial to Crunchyroll.

On August 2, 2026, Crunchyroll and Three Ten Merchandising Services announced that they would be collaborating on the second phase of an immersive experience event—which also includes the sale of collectibles—called The Loop, which would be themed around the anime series, along with Chainsaw Man and The Apothecary Diaries, and takes place from August 22 to October 18 at the Westfield Topanga Mall in Canoga Park, California.

== Reception ==
=== Popularity ===
Jujutsu Kaisen ranked first on the "Nationwide Bookstore Employees' Recommended Comics" by the Honya Club website in 2019. The series ranked 31st on the 2020 "Book of the Year" list by Da Vinci magazine; it ranked fourth on the 2021 list; sixth on the 2022 list; fourteenth on the 2023 list; and it topped the 2024 list. On TV Asahi's Manga Sōsenkyo 2021 poll, in which 150,000 people voted for their top 100 manga series, Jujutsu Kaisen ranked nineteenth. On a 2021 survey conducted by Line Research asking Japanese high school students what manga series they are currently into, Jujutsu Kaisen topped the rankings for both girls and boys. Along with Akuta no Shinigiwa and Shitsugai-ki Shitsu Chome Tanpenshū, Jujutsu Kaisen ranked thirteenth on Takarajimasha's Kono Manga ga Sugoi! list of best manga of 2025 for male readers.

In Tumblr's 2021 Year in Review, which highlights the largest communities, fandoms, and trends on the platform throughout the year, Jujutsu Kaisen ranked second behind My Hero Academia on the Top Anime & Manga Shows while Satoru Gojo was fifth on the Top Anime & Manga Characters category. It placed nineteenth on the annual Twitter Japan's Trend Awards in 2021, based on the social network's top trending topics of the year.

=== Sales ===
The Jujutsu Kaisen manga had 600,000 copies in circulation by December 2018; 770,000 copies in circulation by February 1, 2019; 1.1 million copies in circulation by February 2019; 2 million copies in circulation by June 2019; 2.5 million copies in circulation by November 2019; 4.5 million copies in circulation by May 2020; 6.8 million copies in circulation by September 2020; and over 10 million copies in circulation by October 2020, (Note: Including digital copies and Jujutsu Kaisen 0.) having grown 400% in one year, and about 230% in a half year. By December 2020, the series had 15 million copies in circulation. By January 13, 2021, the series had over 20 million copies in circulation, and increased to 25 million copies in circulation by January 26. By February 2021, the manga had over 30 million copies in circulation. By the start of March 2021, the series had over 36 million copies in circulation, and by the end of the month, the manga recorded over 40 million copies in circulation. By April 2021, the manga had over 45 million copies in circulation. By May 2021, the manga had over 50 million copies in circulation. By October 2021, the manga had over 55 million copies in circulation. By December 2021, the manga had over 60 million copies in circulation. By April 2022, the manga had over 65 million copies in circulation. By August 2022, the manga had over 70 million copies in circulation. By July 2023, the manga had over 80 million copies in circulation. By January 2024, the manga had over 90 million copies in circulation. By September 2024, the manga had over 100 million copies in circulation. By December 2025, the manga had over 150 million copies in circulation.

Jujutsu Kaisen was the fifth best-selling manga series in 2020 (from the period between November 2019 and November 2020), with 6,702,736 copies sold. In January 2021, Jujutsu Kaisen's first fifteen volumes at the time (including volume 0) took 15 of top 16 spots of Oricon's weekly manga ranking (week of January 11–17), being only surpassed by Attack on Titan's 33rd volume, which topped the list. Jujutsu Kaisen was the second best-selling manga series in the first half of 2021 (period between November 2020 and May 2021), behind Demon Slayer: Kimetsu no Yaiba, with over 23 million copies sold, while its 16 volumes at the time (including volume 0), were among the 25 best-selling manga volumes. It was the best-selling manga series in 2021, with over 30 million copies sold; its eighteen volumes at the time (including volume 0) were among the top 25 best-selling volumes. It was the best-selling manga series for second consecutive year in 2022, with over 12.2 million copies sold; volume 18 was the best-selling manga volume of the year, while volumes 17, 19 and 20 were among the 30 best-selling manga volumes of the year. It was the fourth best-selling manga series in the first half of 2023 (period between November 2022 and May 2023), with over 3.7 million copies sold, while volumes 21 and 22 were the second and third best-selling manga volumes from the same period, respectively. Volumes 21–24 were among the best-selling manga volumes of 2023. Volume 23 was Shueisha's second highest first print run manga volume of 2023–2024 (period between April 2023 and March 2024), with 1.75 million copies printed; volumes 29 and 30 each had an initial print run of 1.8 million copies, making them the publisher's second-highest first-print manga volumes of 2024–2025 (period between April 2024 and March 2025). Volume 25 was the second best-selling manga volume of 2024, with 1,542,345 copies sold, while volumes 26, 27, and 28 placed fourth, fifth, and ninth, respectively. Volumes 29 and 30 were among the best-selling manga volumes of 2025, placing third and second, respectively.

In North America, the volumes of Jujutsu Kaisen were ranked on Circana (formerly NPD) BookScan's monthly top 20 adult graphic novels list since January 2021. They were also ranked on The New York Times' Graphic Books and Manga bestseller monthly list since February 2021. According to ICv2, Jujutsu Kaisen was the seventh best-selling manga franchise for Q4 2021 (September–December) in the United States, and it was also the sixth "most efficient manga franchise" for retailer bookshelves, based on the website's calculations of which manga franchises had the highest sales per volume. According to NPD BookScan, the first volume of Jujutsu Kaisen (including volume 0) was ranked among the top 20 highest-selling manga volumes in 2022; four volumes (including volume 0) were among the top 20 highest-selling manga volumes in 2023.

=== Critical reception ===
Leroy Douresseaux of Comic Book Bin gave the first volume a score of 8.5/10. Douresseaux praised the series for its characters, plots, settings, and internal mythology, and described it as a "combination battle manga and horror comic book". Shawn Hacaga of The Fandom Post, in his review of the first volume, compared the series to early Bleach and praised it for its world, lore, characters and artwork, concluding that it is a "solid first volume". Hannah Collins of CBR found parallels between Yuji and Sukuna and Marvel Comics characters Eddie Brock and Venom. She also noted similarities to Bleach, Blue Exorcist and Tokyo Ghoul. Collins commended the manga and, regarding its then recently announced anime adaptation, concluded that Jujutsu Kaisen is a "darkly enjoyable action series that's sure to be one to watch out for in 2020". Rebecca Silverman of Anime News Network ranked the first volume as a C. Silverman praised the series's use of Japanese folklore and yōkai elements, comparing this and Akutami's art style to Shigeru Mizuki's GeGeGe no Kitarō, but criticized the story for being "very generic". She concluded, "It has the potential to be more as Akutami gets more comfortable with the serialization process and figures out precisely where the story is going, so it may be worth a second book to be certain. But as of this one, it's just okay, making it the kind of series that gets damned with faint praise". Azusa Takahashi of Real Sound praised its storytelling, setting and "surprising" story development, also noting similarities to other works like Bleach, Ushio & Tora and Neon Genesis Evangelion, stating, however, that the series is not only a homage to popular works centered on the battle development, but that it has a "clever composition that sublimates into originality".

=== Accolades ===
Jujutsu Kaisen was sixth on the fifth Next Manga Awards in the Print category in 2018. It won the third annual Tsutaya Comic Award in 2019. In 2019, the manga was nominated for the 65th Shogakukan Manga Award in the shōnen category. Jujutsu Kaisen won the Mandō Kobayashi Manga Grand Prix 2020, created by comedian and manga enthusiast Kendo Kobayashi, in which each year's winner is decided based on his personal taste. The manga was nominated for the 25th annual Tezuka Osamu Cultural Prize in 2021.

=== Novels ===
Jujutsu Kaisen: Iku Natsu to Kaeru Aki and Jujutsu Kaisen: Yoake no Ibara Michi were among the best-selling novel series in the first half of 2021 (period between November 2020 and May 2021), with 235,170 and 206,059 copies sold, respectively, and both novels were the best-selling-novel volumes in the first half of 2021. Both novels were the best-selling novels of 2021, selling a combined total of 487,434 copies.
