= Satoru Gojo =

Fictional character from Jujutsu Kaisen

- Jujutsu Kaisen character
- Satoru Gojo as drawn by Gege Akutami
- First appearance: Jujutsu Kaisen 0 #1, "The Cursed Child" (2017)
- Created by: Gege Akutami
- Voiced by: Japanese: Yuichi Nakamura; Mariya Ise (young); English: Kaiji Tang; Cristina Vee (young); Hindi: Lohit Sharma

In-universe information
- Nickname: The Honored One
- Gender: Male
- Occupation: Teacher / Jujutsu Sorcerer (Special-grade)
- Weapon: Six Eyes; Limitless; Hollow Purple
- Family: Michizane Sugawara (ancestor); Yuta Okkotsu (distant relative)
- Nationality: Japanese

Satoru Gojo (Japanese: 五条 悟, Hepburn: Gojō Satoru), often known as The Honored One, is a fictional character from Gege Akutami's manga and anime series Jujutsu Kaisen. He was first introduced in Akutami's short series Tokyo Metropolitan Curse Technical School as the mentor of the cursed teenager Yuta Okkotsu, who suffers from Rika's curse. This miniseries became the prequel Jujutsu Kaisen 0 of Jujutsu Kaisen. In Jujutsu Kaisen, Gojo takes up the same role, but instead mentors student Yuji Itadori who suffers a curse of Sukuna.

Gojo was designed by Akutami to be a formidable yet endearing figure who is passionate about his students. He is voiced by Yūichi Nakamura in Japanese, Kaiji Tang in English and Lohit Sharma in Hindi in the animated adaptations by MAPPA. The character garnered positive reception by the media for his carefree nature and power shown when protecting his students, becoming the series' breakout character.

== Creation and conception ==
Akutami's key idea for Gojo's design was a blindfold he could see through due to his supernatural powers. His Six Eyes bear extrasensory powers, granting him the intensified ability to manipulate, see and read cursed energy, as well as amplify his own technique, Limitless. In his debut in Jujutsu Kaisen 0, Akutami linked Gojo and Yuta Okkotsu to Michizane Sugawara, a famous figure in Japanese history, which he described as the source of both characters' supernatural powers. This was done as a tribute to his late editor, Yamanaka. Gojo's design is intended to be one of a bishonen. His facial design was inspired by major Naruto character Tonbo Tobitake. In regards to Gojo's relationship with his students such as Yuji Itadori and Yuta Okkotsu, Akutami wrote their relationship simply, as he claims Gojo only wants troublemakers like them to become strong. Despite the Japanese custom of calling individuals by last names, he refers to his students by their first names. Akutami said he made this decision because he thought that Gojo did not have proper considerations for such social traditions.

Sunghoo Park, the director of Jujutsu Kaisen's first season as well as Jujutsu Kaisen 0, said adapting one of Gojo's early scenes involving the Domain Expansion scene in the season was particularly tough to produce. Nevertheless, he saw it as memorable. Since the original scene was black-and-white, Park and his team consulted Akutami for guidance on color design from Gojo's Domain Expansion. In regards to the animated movie, Park wanted to focus on more characters from the manga, most notably of which being the past relationship between Gojo and Geto. Seko was requested by the director to feature a new fight scene between Gojo and Miguel in the climax.

The song "Where Our Blue Is" by Tatsuya Kitani, which acts as the opening of the anime's second season, depicts the youth of Gojo and Geto alongside an emphasis on blue backgrounds. The opening contrasts the ending theme "Light", which uses a more relaxed melody while emphasizing Gojo and Geto's friendship.

=== Casting ===
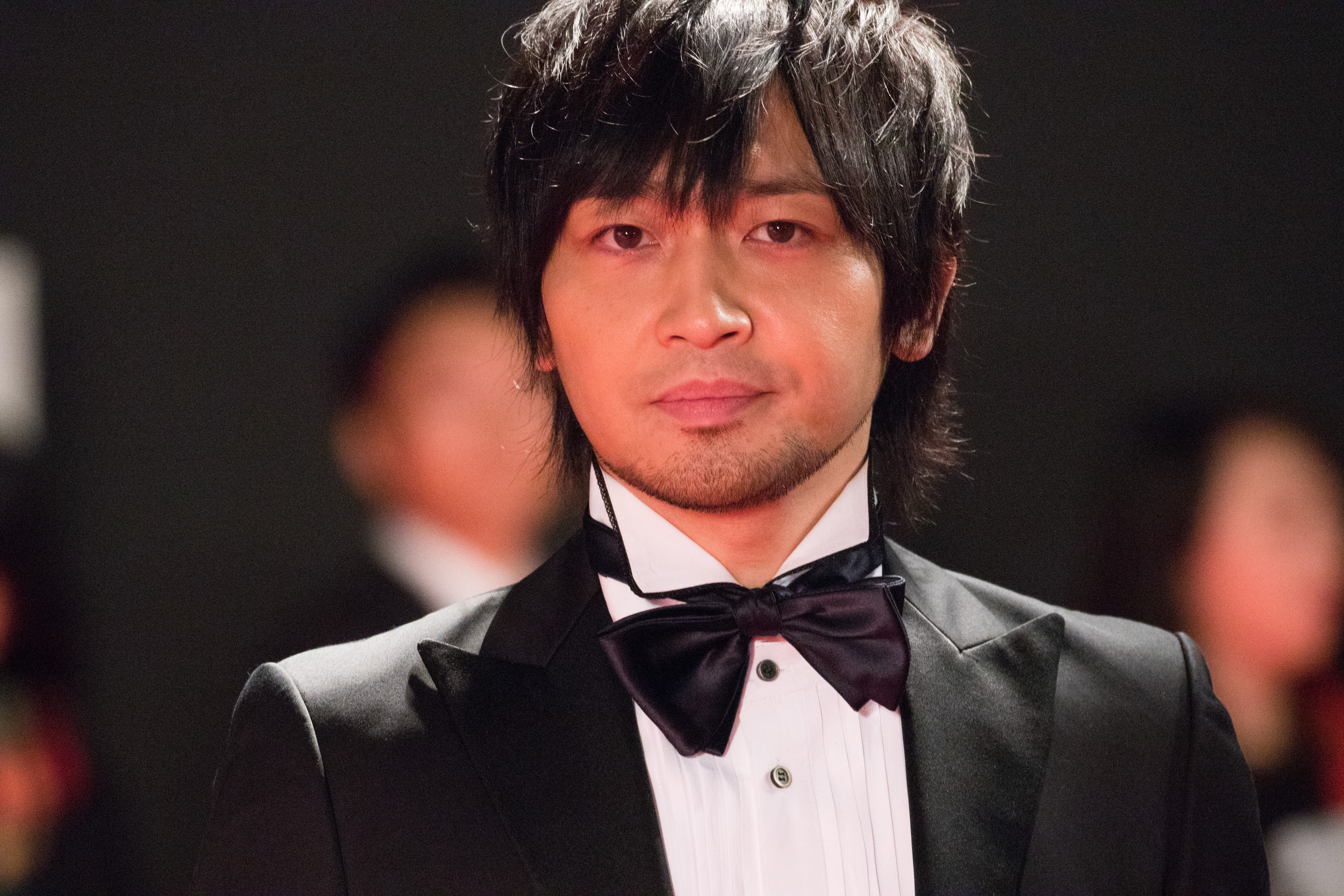
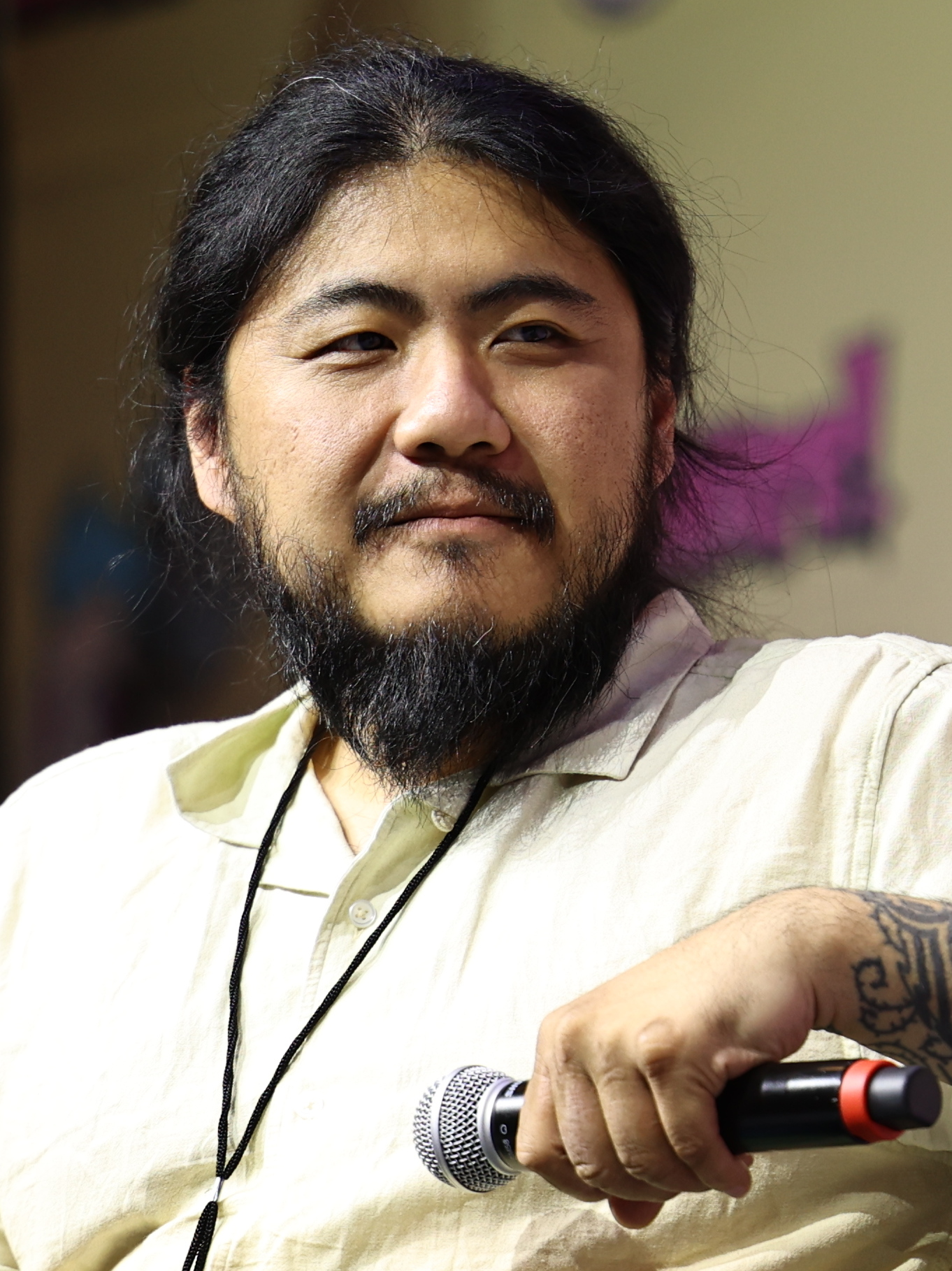
Yuichi Nakamura (left) voices Gojo in Japanese while Kaiji Tang (right) voices the character in English.

Satoru is voiced by Yuichi Nakamura in the original Japanese series. From serious scenes to comical gag scenes, Gojo has different facial expressions, but since Nakamura played without restrictions on the swing range, he reiterated at the recording site that he enjoyed gags. The actor did not find a change in Gojo's characterization, finding his mentoring of Yuta similar to the other protagonists from the main Jujutsu Kaisen series. He enjoyed the recording sessions he had, as well as the many school-like relationships. He was impressed by Megumi Ogata's work as Yuta for providing him with a large range of emotions. Mariya Ise voiced the younger Gojo in a flashback from the anime. Nakamura claimed he struggled in properly portraying Gojo for the anime's second season due to the two story arcs depicting the same character with different quirks and personality as a result of his age. The voice actor was impressed by the animation studio MAPPA which allowed his character to have more facial expressions which resulted in more direction from his superiors.

Kaiji Tang voices Satoru in English. Tang regarded him as one of "the trolliest trolls to ever troll anime." He noted that the character stands out due to his "whimsical" nature and how he interacts with his students. He was also praised for how likeable he comes across, due to the kind nature he portrays in the series with a dark narrative while simultaneously showing interesting supernatural powers. Tang still noted that Gojo's arrogance was his only weak point, which also makes him come across as more human. In order to lipsync the character, Tang ended up ad-libbing, resulting in Gojo swearing when confronting Jogo.

== Appearances ==
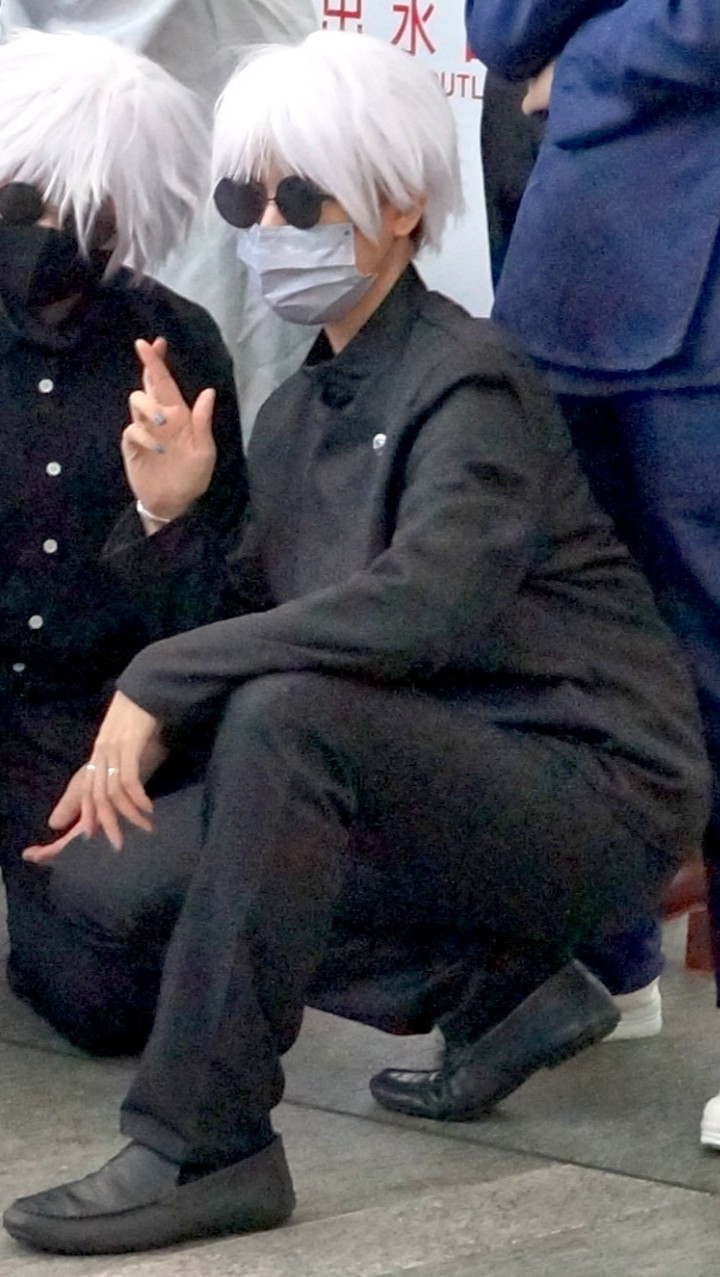
Cosplayers of Satoru Gojo as depicted in Hidden Inventory arc

=== Jujutsu Kaisen 0 ===
A sorcerer working as a teacher at Tokyo Prefectural Jujutsu High School, he holds the self-proclaimed title 'The Strongest'; most allies and enemies alike do not dispute the title and generally consider him to be one of the most dangerous people alive. In the events of Jujutsu Kaisen 0, Gojo recruits Yuta Okkotsu, a high school student, accompanied by his Curse Spirit, Rika Orimoto, and convinces him to join Jujutsu High. During this time, Gojo makes Yuta train with the previous year students, Panda, Maki Zenin, and Toge Inumaki, to help Yuta control his curse and develop friendships. Yuta's curse attracts Suguru Geto, a previous student at Jujutsu High and an old friend of Gojo. Geto seeks Yuta's curse and wishes to create a sorcerer-only world. Geto is gravely injured after his fight with Okkotsu and is later executed by Gojo. Gojo then helps Yuta understand the true nature of his curse and powers.

Gojo as depicted in anime adaptations of Jujutsu Kaisen by MAPPA

=== Jujutsu Kaisen ===
On the day of the Kyoto Goodwill Event, Gojo meets up with other faculty members to watch the event. As it begins, he watches it through monitors with the other faculties. When intruders invade the site, Gojo heads over to the site along with Utahime and Yoshinobu. He engages with Juzo first, easily restraining him, while using his Hollow Purple Technique on Hanami. Gojo convinces his superiors at the college to keep Yuji Itadori alive until he consumes all of Sukuna's fingers. He teaches Yuji, Megumi Fushiguro, and Nobara Kugisaki.

Afterwards, the manga's Hidden Inventory arc explores Gojo's past. When he, Geto and Shoko were all in high school, they were assigned to escort the Star Plasma Vessel Riko Amanai, who was to merge with the immortal sorcerer, Tengen. When the merging was to take place, they are attacked by mercenary Toji Fushiguro, who defeats the two and kills Riko. As Gojo recovers and kills Toji, Geto begins doubting his duties as a sorcerer, and, having grown annoyed of protecting non-sorcerers, vows to break the cycle and kill every non-sorcerer to prevent the birth of more cursed spirits. He escapes from the school and massacres a village with his powers. Gojo confronts Geto about his crimes, but is unable to kill him and lets him go.

Gojo was later ambushed by the Special Grade Cursed Spirits at Shibuya, and after he exorcised Hanami, Kenjaku manages to seal him away in the Prison Realm. Nevertheless, Gojo lets Yuta protect Yuji from being executed should something bad happen to him. Gojo's students successfully release him from the Prison Realm and he immediately challenges Sukuna to a duel on Christmas Eve. After several exchanges, Gojo comes close to winning, but is killed by Sukuna. He finds himself in airport talking with Geto and his other late friends. His corpse is later used by Yuta to aid Yuji in fighting and defeating Sukuna.

== Reception ==
=== Popularity ===
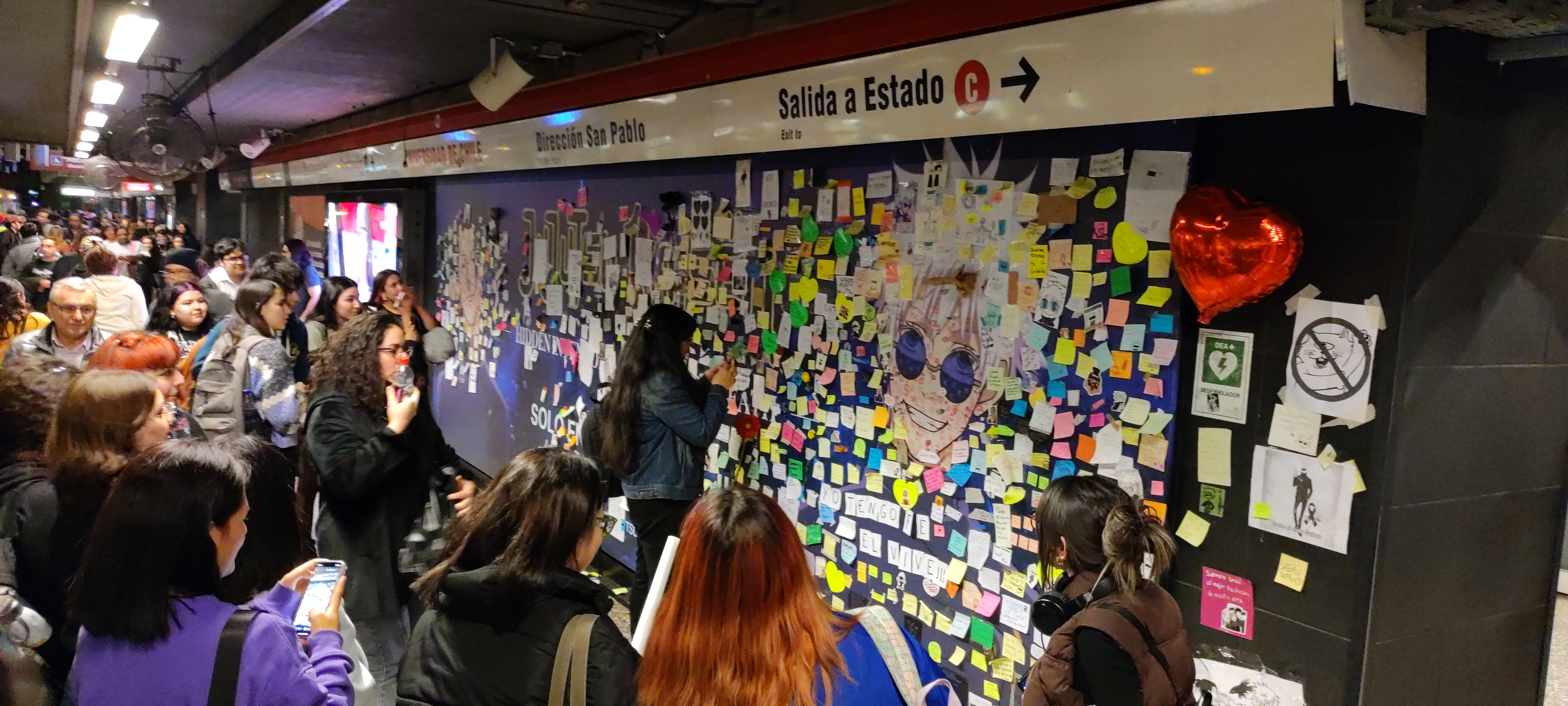
Tribute to Satoru Gojo in the Universidad de Chile station of Santiago Metro

Satoru Gojo was positively received by the series' readers and critics. At the 5th Crunchyroll Anime Awards, Gojo and his fight against Ryomen Sukuna was nominated for Best Boy and Best Fight Scene, respectively. Yuichi Nakamura's performance as Gojo was one of the nominees for Best Voice Artist Performance (Japanese). Nakamura won "Best Actor in Supporting Role" for his work as Satoru Gojo in the 16th Seiyu Awards. In promoting the movie Jujutsu Kaisen 0, advertisements with Gojo as a dog were made alongside SoftBank Group. In December 2021, MAPPA and Shueisha also celebrated Gojo's birthday with PulpFiction Cine finding him as one of the most popular characters from the series while also promoting the movie.

The character attained popularity in Chile when the second season of the anime aired, resulting in fans illustrating Gojo at an advertising billboard located inside Universidad de Chile station of Metro de Santiago. At the 8th Crunchyroll Anime Awards, Gojo won the award for Best Supporting Character. Three of Gojo's international voice actors were nominated in the voice acting categories, namely Yuichi Nakamura (Japanese), Jose Gilberto Vilchis (Spanish), and Léo Rabelo (Portuguese); Nakamura and Rabelo won their respective awards, while Vilchis lost to Emilio Treviño's Denji. He won the Newtype Anime Award for Best Male Character in 2024. At the 9th Crunchyroll Anime Awards in 2025, Lohit Sharma won Best Voice Artist Performance (Hindi) for his performance as Gojo.

=== Critical response ===
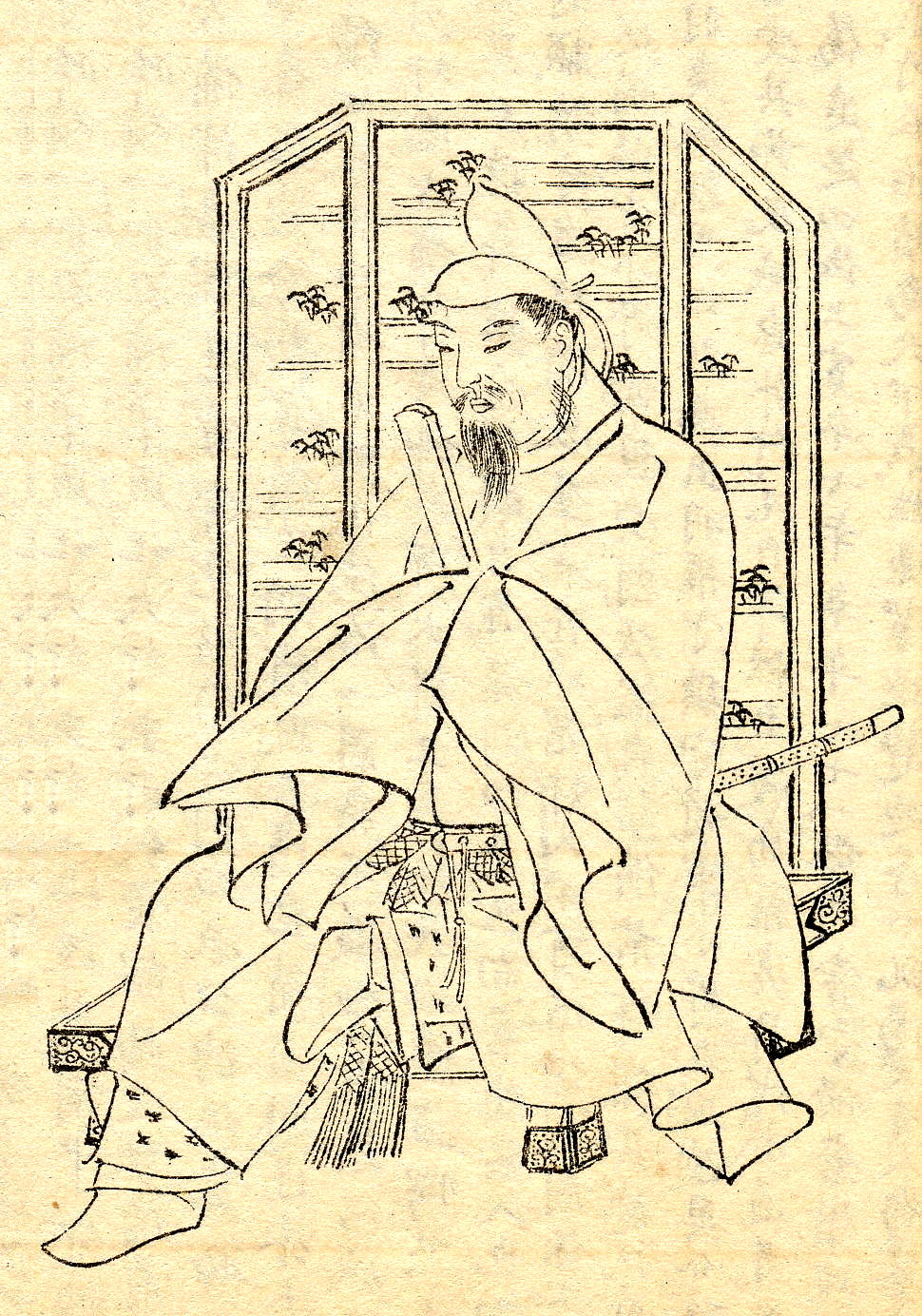
Sugawara no Michizane's link with Yuta Okkotsu and Gojo resulted in theories about whether or not the historical figure will make a major impact in the narrative, which was kept vague in the main story.

IGN called Gojo as a fan-favorite character due to the focus of his personality. StudyBreak noted that Gojo's flamboyant personality often comes across fitting comic relief, citing how he reacts when he thinks Fushiguro is being hit on by a woman as well as how impressive he is shown to be in combat against a serious threat. News website Bleeding Cool had compared him to other mentor characters like Kakashi Hatake, All Might or Aizawa, and said that Gojo remains as more likable within this archetype as a result of how "The character is truly a balance of caring coldness with power that keeps dismissing any serious threats", particularly for how caring he is to his students and the might he shows in battle sequences. Anime News Network praised the fight scene Gojo has against Jogo for the handling of visuals, finding it far superior than the studio's previous work The God of High School, referred by the staff as "irredeemable trash" not only due to the narrative but also pacing in handling Gojo's fight sequence. This made the anime adaptation of Jujutsu Kaisen develop its potential in the process. Despite finding Gojo as an archetype due to the overpowered he is portrayed as, the reviewer still found his personality enjoyable.

The Mary Sue found Gojo's characterization in Jujutsu Kaisen 0 identical to the main series as a result of how he trains the students but still found the pilot helped to further explore his past as a result of his tragic relationship with Geto. Crunchyroll listed Gojo's higher screen time in the animated film adaptation of the manga, citing him as a fan favorite character people would appreciate to see. The character's connection with the late Sugawara no Michizane was kept vague that might generate a future impact in the series by critics especially when Yuta Okkotsu reappears in Jujutsu Kaisen and wonders about their relationship to Suguwara. Otaquest also noted the similarities as well as how important is the relationship between Gojo and Geto which ends in a way that surprised the main series' readers. Staff at Manga News had anticipated more focus on the relationship between Gojo and Geto. The eventual exploration of Gojo and Geto's youth in the second season of the anime received the praise by IGN for their dynamic though the site found the former's powers too complicated to explain and that Geto appeared to be more important to see in such arc. Gojo's character has been popular in social focus. Following the anime adaptation of the flashbacks to Geto and Gojo's youth, Polygon's Ana Diaz noticed there were several fans who made dōjinshi stories with them which went viral.

The twist of the manga chapter involving Gojo's death led to manga artist Kenjiro Hata go on a hiatus from writing the manga Fly Me to the Moon due to the need of recovering from the "shocking" event. In September 2023, leaks of the manga's 236th chapter caused a major controversy online within the community. Contents of the chapter had led to the surge in popularity of the GojoSatoru hashtag on X, spawning more than 11,400 posts. Gojo's death despite his confidence when confronting Sukuna and Kenjaku became famous in social media due to the ironic result. Once the series ended, GameRant praised both Gojo and Yuta's characters as the writer noted they overshadowed Yuji, the actual main character of the series.

Gojo has often been compared to Killua Zoldyck from Hunter × Hunter based on physical and personality similarities. When Mariya Ise was cast to portray the younger Gojo in a flashback from the anime's second season, Hindustan Times said the "meme [came] to life" as Ise was known for voicing Killua and fans were "happy" with such casting.
