= List of Jujutsu Kaisen episodes =

Key visual for the series

Jujutsu Kaisen is an anime television series based on the manga series Jujutsu Kaisen by Gege Akutami. The anime series was announced in the 52nd issue of Weekly Shōnen Jump published in November 2019. The story follows high school student Yuji Itadori as he joins a secret organization of Jujutsu Sorcerers in order to kill a powerful Curse User named Ryomen Sukuna, to which Yuji becomes host.

The first season was produced by MAPPA and directed by Sunghoo Park. Hiroshi Seko wrote the scripts, Tadashi Hiramatsu designed the characters, and Hiroaki Tsutsumi, Yoshimasa Terui, and Alisa Okehazama composed the music. While the anime had an advanced streaming debut on September 19, 2020, it officially aired on MBS and TBS's Super Animeism programming block from October 3, 2020, to March 27, 2021. (Note: MBS listed the air dates for the series as Friday at 25:25, which is effectively Saturday at 1:25 a.m. JST.) The season ran for 24 episodes.

The anime is licensed by Crunchyroll for streaming outside of Asia. Crunchyroll has released language dubs for the series in English, Spanish, Portuguese, French, German, and Italian, in addition to a Russian voice-over stream that premiered on November 20, 2020. In Southeast Asia, Medialink licensed the series and streamed it on iQIYI. The first Japanese home media volume was released on January 20, 2021.

On February 12, 2022, a second season was announced. Shōta Goshozono replaced Sunghoo Park as series director, with Sayaka Koiso and Hiramatsu designing the characters and Terui returning as the sole composer. The season aired from July 6 to December 28, 2023. It ran for two continuous cours and adapted the manga's "Hidden Inventory / Premature Death" and "Shibuya Incident" story arcs.

After the second season's finale, a sequel covering the manga's "Culling Game" story arc was announced. In August 2025, it was revealed that the sequel would be the third season. It premiered with a one-hour special featuring the first two episodes on January 9, 2026. (Note: MBS listed the third season's episodes as airing on Thursdays at 24:26, which is effectively Fridays at 12:26 a.m. JST.) The third season concluded with an extended 27-minute episode on March 27, 2026. (Note: It aired on March 26 at 24:26, which is effectively March 27 at 12:26 a.m. JST.) Immediately following its broadcast, a fourth season which is expected to adapt the remaining half of the "Culling Game" was announced. Takeru Satō, the third season's assistant director, will replace Goshozono as director for the fourth season.

== Series overview ==
| Season | Episodes | | Originally released | |
| Season | Episodes | | First released | Last released |
|---|---|---|---|---|
| 1 | 24 | | October 3, 2020 | March 27, 2021 |
| 2 | 23 | 5 | July 6, 2023 | August 3, 2023 |
| 2 | 23 | 18 | August 31, 2023 | December 28, 2023 |
| 3 | 12 | | January 9, 2026 | March 27, 2026 |

== Episodes ==
=== Season 1 (2020–2021) ===
| No. overall | No. in season | Title | Directed by (Note: Production staff information is taken from the ending credits of each episode.) | Chief animation directed by | Original release date |
|---|---|---|---|---|---|
| 1 | 1 | "Ryomen Sukuna" (Japanese: 両面宿儺) | Directed by : Yui Umemoto; Storyboarded by : Tadashi Hiramatsu | Tadashi Hiramatsu | October 3, 2020 (Note: Episode 1 had an advanced streaming debut on September 19, 2020.) |
| 2 | 2 | "For Myself"; Transliteration: "Jibun no Tameni" (Japanese: 自分のために) | Ryōhei Takeshita | Sayaka Koiso | October 10, 2020 |
| 3 | 3 | "Girl of Steel"; Transliteration: "Tekkotsu Musume" (Japanese: 鉄骨娘) | Directed by : Kakushi Ifuku; Storyboarded by : Hiroaki Andō | Takako Shimizu | October 17, 2020 |
| 4 | 4 | "Curse Womb Must Die"; Transliteration: "Jutai Taiten" (Japanese: 呪胎戴天) | Directed by : Hideaki Abe; Storyboarded by : Yoshiaki Kawajiri | Terumi Nishii & Takako Shimizu | October 24, 2020 |
| 5 | 5 | "Curse Womb Must Die -II-"; Transliteration: "Jutai Taiten -Ni-" (Japanese: 呪胎戴天－弐－) | Directed by : Yōsuke Takada; Storyboarded by : Yoshiaki Kawajiri | Yumi Kobayashi | October 31, 2020 |
| 6 | 6 | "After Rain"; Transliteration: "Ugo" (Japanese: 雨後) | Eri Nagata | Eri Nagata | November 7, 2020 |
| 7 | 7 | "Assault"; Transliteration: "Kyūshū" (Japanese: 急襲) | Directed by : Sunghoo Park; Storyboarded by : Takahiro Shikama | Yumi Kobayashi | November 14, 2020 |
| 8 | 8 | "Boredom"; Transliteration: "Taikutsu" (Japanese: 退屈) | Directed by : Shōta Goshozono; Storyboarded by : Tetsuo Hirakawa | Terumi Nishii | November 21, 2020 |
| 9 | 9 | "Small Fry and Reverse Retribution"; Transliteration: "Yōgyo to Sakabachi" (Japanese: 幼魚と逆罰) | Ryōhei Takeshita | Sayaka Koiso | November 28, 2020 |
| 10 | 10 | "Idle Transfiguration"; Transliteration: "Mui Tenpen" (Japanese: 無為転変) | Ken Takahashi | Yumi Kobayashi | December 5, 2020 |
| 11 | 11 | "Narrow-minded"; Transliteration: "Korōshungu" (Japanese: 固陋蠢愚) | Directed by : Daisuke Tsukushi; Storyboarded by : Miyuki Ōshiro | Eri Nagata | December 12, 2020 |
| 12 | 12 | "To You, Someday"; Transliteration: "Itsuka no Kimi e" (Japanese: いつかの君へ) | Directed by : Masataka Akai; Storyboarded by : Fuminori Kizaki | Takako Shimizu | December 19, 2020 |
| 13 | 13 | "Tomorrow"; Transliteration: "Mata Ashita" (Japanese: また明日) | Hironori Tanaka | Terumi Nishii | December 26, 2020 |
| 14 | 14 | "Kyoto Sister School Exchange Event – Group Battle 0 -"; Transliteration: "Kyōto Shimai-kō Kōryū-kai－Dantai-sen (Zero)－" (Japanese: 京都姉妹校交流会－団体戦⓪－) | Directed by : Chie Nishizawa; Storyboarded by : Miyuki Ōshiro | Anri Yamazaki | January 16, 2021 |
| 15 | 15 | "Kyoto Sister School Exchange Event – Group Battle 1 -"; Transliteration: "Kyōto Shimai-kō Kōryū-kai－Dantai-sen (Ichi)－" (Japanese: 京都姉妹校交流会－団体戦①－) | Hideaki Abe | Eri Nagata | January 23, 2021 |
| 16 | 16 | "Kyoto Sister School Exchange Event – Group Battle 2 -"; Transliteration: "Kyōto Shimai-kō Kōryū-kai－Dantai-sen (Ni)－" (Japanese: 京都姉妹校交流会－団体戦②－) | Masato Nakazono | Terumi Nishii | January 30, 2021 |
| 17 | 17 | "Kyoto Sister School Exchange Event – Group Battle 3 -"; Transliteration: "Kyōto Shimai-kō Kōryū-kai－Dantai-sen (San)－" (Japanese: 京都姉妹校交流会－団体戦③－) | Shōta Goshozono | Sayaka Koiso | February 6, 2021 |
| 18 | 18 | "Sage"; Transliteration: "Kenja" (Japanese: 賢者) | Directed by : Yōsuke Takada; Storyboarded by : Fuminori Kizaki | Yumi Kobayashi | February 13, 2021 |
| 19 | 19 | "Black Flash"; Transliteration: "Kokusen" (Japanese: 黒閃) | Ryū Nakayama | Terumi Nishii | February 20, 2021 |
| 20 | 20 | "Nonstandard"; Transliteration: "Kikaku-gai" (Japanese: 規格外) | Directed by : Masataka Akai; Storyboarded by : Fuminori Kizaki | Takako Shimizu | February 27, 2021 |
| 21 | 21 | "Jujutsu Koshien" (Japanese: 呪術甲子園) | Yui Umemoto | Eri Nagata | March 6, 2021 |
| 22 | 22 | "The Origin of Blind Obedience"; Transliteration: "Kishu Raidō" (Japanese: 起首雷同) | Tomomi Kamiya | N/A | March 13, 2021 |
| 23 | 23 | "The Origin of Blind Obedience – 2 -"; Transliteration: "Kishu Raidō -Ni-" (Japanese: 起首雷同－弐－) | Directed by : Chie Nishizawa; Storyboarded by : Sunghoo Park | Terumi Nishii & Yumi Kobayashi | March 20, 2021 |
| 24 | 24 | "Accomplices"; Transliteration: "Kyōhan" (Japanese: 共犯) | Sunghoo Park | Takako Shimizu, Sayaka Koiso & Eri Nagata | March 27, 2021 |

=== Season 2 (2023) ===
==== Hidden Inventory / Premature Death ====
| No. overall | No. in season | Title | Directed by | Chief animation directed by | Original release date | Viewership rating |
|---|---|---|---|---|---|---|
| 25 | 1 | "Hidden Inventory"; Transliteration: "Kaigyoku" (Japanese: 懐玉) | Shōta Goshozono | Sayaka Koiso | July 6, 2023 | 2.6% |
| 26 | 2 | "Hidden Inventory 2"; Transliteration: "Kaigyoku -Ni-" (Japanese: 懐玉-弐-) | Yōsuke Takada | Mitsue Mori | July 13, 2023 | 2.3% |
| 27 | 3 | "Hidden Inventory 3"; Transliteration: "Kaigyoku -San-" (Japanese: 懐玉-参-) | Naoki Miyajima | Reina Igawa, Takako Shimizu & Sayaka Koiso | July 20, 2023 | 2.2% |
| 28 | 4 | "Hidden Inventory 4"; Transliteration: "Kaigyoku -Shi-" (Japanese: 懐玉-肆-) | Arifumi Imai | Yosuke Yajima | July 27, 2023 | 2.6% |
| 29 | 5 | "Premature Death"; Transliteration: "Gyokusetsu" (Japanese: 玉折) | Directed by : Atsushi Nakagawa; Storyboarded by : Shōta Goshozono | Sota Yamazaki | August 3, 2023 | 2.0% |

==== Shibuya Incident ====
| No. overall | No. in season | Title | Directed by | Chief animation directed by | Original release date | Viewership rating |
|---|---|---|---|---|---|---|
| 30 | 6 | "It's Like That"; Transliteration: "Sō Iu Koto" (Japanese: そういうこと) | Ryota Aikei | Reina Igawa & Sayaka Koiso | August 31, 2023 | 2.3% |
| 31 | 7 | "Evening Festival"; Transliteration: "Yoimatsuri" (Japanese: 宵祭り) | Directed by : Yooto & Atsushi Nakagawa; Storyboarded by : Yooto & Teppei Okuda | Mitsue Mori | September 7, 2023 | N/A |
| 32 | 8 | "The Shibuya Incident"; Transliteration: "Shibuya Jihen" (Japanese: 渋谷事変) | Hiroyuki Kitakubo | Yosuke Yajima | September 15, 2023 (Note: This episode aired at 12:01 a.m. JST, 5 minutes after the original air time) | N/A |
| 33 | 9 | "Shibuya Incident – Gate, Open"; Transliteration: "Shibuya Jihen – Kaimon" (Japanese: 渋谷事変 開門) | Directed by : Teppei Okuda; Storyboarded by : Shōta Goshozono | Sayaka Koiso, Yosuke Yajima & Mitsue Mori | September 22, 2023 | 2.2% |
| 34 | 10 | "Pandemonium"; Transliteration: "Konran" (Japanese: 昏乱) | Yōsuke Takada | Reina Igawa | September 29, 2023 | N/A |
| 35 | 11 | "Seance"; Transliteration: "Kōrei" (Japanese: 降霊) | Hayato Kurosaki | Yosuke Yajima, Hiromi Niwa & Reina Igawa | October 6, 2023 | N/A |
| 36 | 12 | "Dull Knife"; Transliteration: "Dontō" (Japanese: 鈍刀) | Shunsuke Okubo | Sayaka Koiso, Reina Igawa & Sota Yamazaki | October 12, 2023 | N/A |
| 37 | 13 | "Red Scale"; Transliteration: "Sekirin" (Japanese: 赫鱗) | Kazuto Arai & Takumi Sunakohara | Yosuke Yajima & Mitsue Mori | October 19, 2023 | N/A |
| 38 | 14 | "Fluctuations"; Transliteration: "Yōtō" (Japanese: 揺蕩) | Tō Tatsuta | Kazutaka Sugiyama, Shun & Yosuke Yajima | October 26, 2023 | N/A |
| 39 | 15 | "Fluctuations, Part 2"; Transliteration: "Yōtō -Ni-" (Japanese: 揺蕩-弐-) | Directed by : Isuta, Ryota Aikei, Hayato Kurosaki, Teppei Okuda & Fei-hung; Storyboarded by : Takao Abo & Isuta | Reina Igawa & Ya Zhi Lu | November 2, 2023 | 2.4% |
| 40 | 16 | "Thunderclap"; Transliteration: "Hekireki" (Japanese: 霹靂) | Itsuki Tsuchigami | Sota Yamazaki | November 9, 2023 | 2.4% |
| 41 | 17 | "Thunderclap, Part 2"; Transliteration: "Hekireki -Ni-" (Japanese: 霹靂-弐-) | Itsuki Tsuchigami, Hakuyu Go & Harumi Yamazaki | N/A | November 16, 2023 | N/A |
| 42 | 18 | "Right and Wrong"; Transliteration: "Rihi" (Japanese: 理非) | Directed by : Shōta Goshozono & Yōsuke Takada; Storyboarded by : Shōta Goshozono | Sayaka Koiso & Mitsue Mori | November 23, 2023 | N/A |
| 43 | 19 | "Right and Wrong, Part 2"; Transliteration: "Rihi -Ni-" (Japanese: 理非-弐-) | Naoki Miyajima | Reina Igawa | November 30, 2023 | N/A |
| 44 | 20 | "Right and Wrong, Part 3"; Transliteration: "Rihi -San-" (Japanese: 理非-参-) | Yūji Tokuno | Hiromi Niwa, Sota Yamazaki, Mitsue Mori & Yuriko Ishii | December 7, 2023 | 2.3% |
| 45 | 21 | "Metamorphosis"; Transliteration: "Henshin" (Japanese: 変身) | Tetsuya Akutsu | Yosuke Yajima, Sayaka Koiso, Sota Yamazaki & Hiromi Niwa | December 14, 2023 | N/A |
| 46 | 22 | "Metamorphosis, Part 2"; Transliteration: "Henshin -Ni-" (Japanese: 変身-弐-) | Directed by : Ryota Aikei & Yōsuke Takada; Storyboarded by : Ryota Aikei | Reina Igawa, Yosuke Yajima, Yuriko Ishii, Mitsue Mori, Sota Yamazaki & Hiromi Niwa | December 22, 2023 (Note: This episode aired at 12:26 a.m. JST, 30 minutes after the original air time) | N/A |
| 47 | 23 | "Shibuya Incident – Gate, Close"; Transliteration: "Shibuya Jihen – Heimon" (Japanese: 渋谷事変 閉門) | Shōta Goshozono | Sayaka Koiso, Hiromi Niwa, Reina Igawa, Yosuke Yajima & Sota Yamazaki | December 28, 2023 | 3.1% |

=== Season 3: The Culling Game: Part 1 (2026) ===
| No. overall | No. in season | Title | Directed by | Chief animation directed by | Original release date |
|---|---|---|---|---|---|
| 48 | 1 | "Execution"; Transliteration: "Shikkō" (Japanese: 執行) | Shōta Goshozono | Yosuke Yajima & Hiromi Niwa | January 9, 2026 (Note: Episodes 48 and 49 aired back-to-back as a one-hour special) |
| 49 | 2 | "One More Time"; Transliteration: "Mōichido" (Japanese: もう一度) | Directed by : Yōsuke Takada; Storyboarded by : Shōta Goshozono | Yosuke Yajima, Hiromi Niwa, Sota Yamazaki & Mitsue Mori | January 9, 2026 |
| 50 | 3 | "About the Culling Game"; Transliteration: "Shimetsu Kaiyū ni Tsuite" (Japanese: 死滅回遊について) | Directed by : Takumi Ichikawa; Storyboarded by : Shōta Goshozono | Mitsue Mori | January 16, 2026 |
| 51 | 4 | "Perfect Preparation"; Transliteration: "Ashi o Fukumu" (Japanese: 葦を啣む) | Directed by : Shōta Goshozono, Risa Suzuki & Yuusuke Sunouchi; Storyboarded by : Shōta Goshozono | Yosuke Yajima, Hiromi Niwa, Takako Shimizu & Sota Yamazaki | January 23, 2026 |
| 52 | 5 | "Passion"; Transliteration: "Netsu" (Japanese: 熱) | Directed by : Masaomi Andō; Storyboarded by : Shōta Goshozono | Mitsue Mori & Yosuke Yajima | January 30, 2026 |
| 53 | 6 | "Cog"; Transliteration: "Buhin" (Japanese: 部品) | Directed by : Seimei Kidokoro; Storyboarded by : Shōta Goshozono | Yosuke Yajima | February 6, 2026 |
| 54 | 7 | "Tokyo Colony No. 1"; Transliteration: "Tōkyō Dai-Ichi Koronii (Ichi)" (Japanese: 東京第1結界(コロニー)①) | Directed by : Takeru Satō; Storyboarded by : Shōta Goshozono | Hiromi Niwa, Takako Shimizu, Tomomi Noda & Mitsue Mori | February 13, 2026 |
| 55 | 8 | "Tokyo Colony No. 1 - Part 2"; Transliteration: "Tōkyō Dai-Ichi Koronii (Ni)" (Japanese: 東京第1結界(コロニー)②) | Yōsuke Takada | Yosuke Yajima | February 27, 2026 |
| 56 | 9 | "Tokyo Colony No. 1 - Part 3"; Transliteration: "Tōkyō Dai-Ichi Koronii (San)" (Japanese: 東京第1結界(コロニー)③) | Directed by : Teppei Okuda; Storyboarded by : Shōta Goshozono | Yosuke Yajima, Hiromi Niwa & Tomomi Noda | March 6, 2026 |
| 57 | 10 | "Tokyo Colony No. 1 - Part 4"; Transliteration: "Tōkyō Dai-Ichi Koronii (Yon)" (Japanese: 東京第1結界(コロニー)④) | Directed by : Takumi Ichikawa; Storyboarded by : Shōta Goshozono | Yosuke Yajima, Takako Shimizu & Sota Yamazaki | March 13, 2026 |
| 58 | 11 | "Tokyo Colony No. 1 - Part 5"; Transliteration: "Tōkyō Dai-Ichi Koronii (Go)" (Japanese: 東京第1結界(コロニー)⑤) | Directed by : Risa Suzuki; Storyboarded by : Shōta Goshozono | Mitsue Mori, Hiromi Niwa & Tomomi Noda | March 20, 2026 |
| 59 | 12 | "Sendai Colony"; Transliteration: "Sendai Koronii" (Japanese: 仙台結界(コロニー)) | Directed by : Yōsuke Takada, Takeru Satō, Ryota Aikei, Shinya Iino, Hiroki Yamamoto, Takumi Sunakohara & Hiroshi Kobayashi; Storyboarded by : Shōta Goshozono & Itsuki Tsuchigami | Yosuke Yajima, Hiromi Niwa, Sota Yamazaki, Takako Shimizu, Mitsue Mori & Tomomi Noda | March 27, 2026 |

== Home media release ==
=== Japanese ===
==== Season 1 ====
| Vol. | Date | Discs | Episodes |
|---|---|---|---|
| 1 | January 20, 2021 | 1 | 1–3 |
| 2 | February 17, 2021 | 1 | 4–6 |
| 3 | March 17, 2021 | 1 | 7–9 |
| 4 | April 21, 2021 | 1 | 10–12 |
| 5 | May 26, 2021 | 1 | 13–15 |
| 6 | June 23, 2021 | 1 | 16–18 |
| 7 | July 21, 2021 | 1 | 19–21 |
| 8 | August 18, 2021 | 1 | 22–24 |

==== Season 2 ====
| Vol. | | Date | Discs | Episodes |
|---|---|---|---|---|
| Hidden Inventory / Premature Death (Note: Kaigyoku / Gyokusetsu (懐玉・玉折)) | 1 | October 18, 2023 | 1 | 25–27 |
| Hidden Inventory / Premature Death | 2 | November 22, 2023 | 1 | 28–29 |
| Shibuya Incident (Note: Shibuya Jihen (渋谷事変)) | 1 | December 20, 2023 | 1 | 30–32 |
| Shibuya Incident | 2 | January 24, 2024 | 1 | 33–35 |
| Shibuya Incident | 3 | February 21, 2024 | 1 | 36–38 |
| Shibuya Incident | 4 | March 20, 2024 | 1 | 39–41 |
| Shibuya Incident | 5 | April 17, 2024 | 1 | 42–44 |
| Shibuya Incident | 6 | May 22, 2024 | 1 | 45–47 |

==== Season 3 ====
| Vol. | | Date | Discs | Episodes |
|---|---|---|---|---|
| The Culling Game: Part 1 (Note: Shimetsu Kaiyū: Zenpen (死滅回游 前編)) | 1 | April 15, 2026 | 2 | 48–50 |
| The Culling Game: Part 1 | 2 | May 20, 2026 | 2 | 51–53 |
| The Culling Game: Part 1 | 3 | June 17, 2026 | 2 | 54–56 |
| The Culling Game: Part 1 | 4 | July 15, 2026 | 2 | 57–59 |

=== English ===
==== Season 1 ====
| Part | Date | Discs | Episodes |
|---|---|---|---|
| 1 | February 28, 2023 | 2 | 1–12 |
| 2 | October 31, 2023 | 2 | 13–24 |

==== Season 2 ====
| Arc | Date | Discs | Episodes |
|---|---|---|---|
| Hidden Inventory / Premature Death | February 4, 2025 | 1 | 25–29 |
| Shibuya Incident | March 18, 2025 | 3 | 30–47 |
