= Under Blue =

2024 album by Eve

Studio album by Eve
- Released: November 27, 2024
- Genre: J-pop; rock
- Length: 63:35
- Language: Japanese
- Label: Toy's Factory

Eve chronology
Kaizin (2022)	Under Blue (2024)

Singles from Under Blue
- 1. "Bubble" Released: April 21, 2022; 2. "Shirayuki" Released: December 1, 2022; 3. "Fight Song" Released: December 28, 2022; 4. "Bokurano" Released: January 7, 2023; 5. "Boukenroku" Released: August 11, 2023; 6. "Hanaarashi" Released: October 1, 2023; 7. "Touhikou" Released: December 25, 2023; 8. "Insomnia" Released: March 1, 2024; 9. "Sweet Memory" Released: July 7, 2024; 10. "The Rewind Story" Released: August 1, 2024; 11. "Teenage Blue" Released: October 4, 2024

Under Blue is the fourth major studio album by Japanese singer Eve. It was released on November 27, 2024, through Toy's Factory. The album consists of nineteen tracks, twelve of which were released prior to the release of the album. Under Blue debuted and peaked at number 5 on both the Oricon Albums Chart and Billboard Japan Hot Albums chart.

== Background ==
Following the release of Kaizin on March 16, 2022, Eve began releasing new music the following month. Twelve tracks preceded the release of Under Blue, with eleven of them released as singles. Eve officially announced the album on August 20, 2024, revealing the title, cover art and the release date on X (formerly known as Twitter).

== Release and promotion ==
Under Blue was released on November 27, 2024. Following the album's release, Eve revealed the overall theming in an interview with Natalie:

Japanese: れだけ曲がある中で、どの曲にも共通するものってなんだろうとぼんやり考えていたんですが、まず真っ先に「青」は入れたいなという思いがありました。青は自分の好きな色でもありますが、空や海のような光と相性のいい色味だなと感じていて。一方で寂しさや憂い、悲しさみたいな、そういう“ブルー”な気持ちも表現できる。その二面性というか、どこか矛盾しているところが、人間みたいで魅力的だし、それは今回作ってきた19曲、どの楽曲にも言えるんじゃないかと。

[With all these songs, I was vaguely thinking about what they all have in common, and the first thing that came to mind was that I wanted to include the color "blue." Blue is my favorite color, and I feel that it goes well with the light of the sky or the sea. On the other hand, it can also express "blue" feelings like loneliness, melancholy, and sadness. That duality, or the somewhat contradictory nature, is what makes it so attractive, like a human being, and I think that can be said of all of the 19 songs I've created this time.]

Collectible items were included with Under Blue at Japanese retailers Tsutaya, HMV & Books and the Toy's Store, with each retailer carrying a different item. Two retailers released exclusive additional bonus CDs with Under Blue. The Animate-exclusive "collaboration CD" contained previously released collaboration tracks "Like The Flatwoods Monster" with Deu (フラットウッズのモンスターみたいに) and "Pray" with Hiroyuki Sawano, while the Tower Records Japan-exclusive "self cover CD" included the tracks "Glorious Day" featuring Hatsune Miku, and "Memento" (メメント) featuring Nqrse.

=== Cover art ===
The cover art was created by Japanese illustrator Kukka, who previously worked on the cover of Eve's Bokurano EP.

=== Singles ===
Under Blue compiles a significant amount of singles, many with tie-ins to Japanese media including anime series, film and commercials. The earliest single was "Bubble" featuring Uta, released on April 21, 2022, for the Netflix anime film Bubble (2022).

"Fight Song" (ファイトソング) was released on December 28, 2022. It was used as the 12th ending theme for the anime series Chainsaw Man (2022). "Fight Song" peaked at number 29 on the Oricon Combined Singles Chart and number 26 on the Billboard Japan Hot 100.

On January 7, 2023, "Bokurano" (ぼくらの; "Our") was released. It served as the second opening theme for season 6 of the anime series My Hero Academia. "Bokurano" peaked at number 4 on the Oricon Singles Chart, and number 5 on the Oricon Combined Singles Chart, marking Eve's most successful single since "Kaikai Kitan" in 2020. A Bokurano EP was released on March 22, 2023, which included the track "Kororon" (虎狼来). Although "Kororon" was not released individually as a single, it was used in a television commercial for Gatsby.

On July 31, 2024, "The Rewind Story" (巻物語) were released as a promotional song for Coro-Coro Comic's 555th issue, featuring nearly every character from every manga published up to that point, prominently featuring Chrono from Fate Rewinder as the focus of the song, and is animated by Bones Films in collaboration with STORY inc.

"Hanaarashi" was released on October 1, 2023. Before its release, the track was used in a television commercial for Bourbon Corporation, a Japanese confectionary company.

In 2024, "Insomnia" (インソムニア), "Sweet Memory" (スイートメモリー), and "Teenage Blue" (ティーンエイジブルー) were released as theme songs for the live-action film My Home Hero (2024), and the anime series Shōshimin Series (2024) and Blue Box (2024), respectively. "Teenage Blue" debuted at number 17 on the Oricon Digital Singles Chart.

On February 14, 2025, "Midnight Runway" was selected as the ending theme for the 17th episode of Pokétoon.

=== Live performances and tour ===
On October 1, 2024, the Eve Arena Tour 2025 was announced in support of Under Blue, starting on July 12, 2025, in Nagoya, and concluding on August 24, 2025, in Kanagawa Prefecture.

On December 24, 2024, Eve held a concert called "Eve Day: Under Blue Premium Live" (Note: Japanese: Eveの日 [ Under Blue Premium Live ]) in Shinjuku. Tickets were made available by lottery only using a serial number included in the first pressing of all editions of Under Blue.

== Commercial performance ==
Under Blue debuted and peaked at number 5 on the Oricon Albums Chart and Billboard Japan Hot Albums chart, selling 25,824 copies in its first week.

== Track listing ==
Regular edition
No.	Title	Lyrics	Arrangement	Length
1.	"Lazy Cat" (stylized in all lowercase)	Eve	Zingai	2:35
2.	"Teenage Blue" (ティーンエイジブルー)	Eve	Numa; Zingai	3:45
3.	"Touhikou" (逃避行)	Eve	Numa; Zingai	2:58
4.	"Kororon" (虎狼来)	Eve	Numa	3:57
5.	"Fight Song" (ファイトソング)	Eve	Numa	3:32
6.	"Hanaboshi" (花星)	Eve	Eve; Zingai	3:50
7.	"Boukenroku" (冒険録)	Eve	Numa; Zingai	3:48
8.	"Byme"	Eve	Numa	3:15
9.	"The Rewind Story" (巻物語)	Eve	Numa; Zingai	2:29
10.	"Insomnia" (インソムニア)	Eve	Numa; Zingai	3:26
11.	"Bubble" (featuring Uta)	Eve	Numa	3:49
12.	"Sweet Memory" (スイートメモリー)	Eve	Numa; Zingai	3:18
13.	"Shirayuki" (白雪)	Eve	Numa	3:43
14.	"Midnight Runway"	Eve	Numa; Zingai	3:00
15.	"Bokurano" (ぼくらの)	Eve	Numa	3:37
16.	"Hanaarashi" (花嵐)	Eve	Numa; Zingai	3:44
17.	"Sayonara End Roll" (さよならエンドロール)	Eve	Numa; Zingai	3:30
18.	"Under Blue"		Eve; Numa	1:30
19.	"Yumeni Aetara" (夢に逢えたら)	Eve	Numa	3:32
Total length:				63:35

Collaboration CD
No.	Title	Lyrics	Arrangement	Length
1.	"Like The Flatwoods Monster" (フラットウッズのモンスターみたいに) (with Deu)	Eve; Deu	Deu; Zingai	3:01
2.	"Pray" (stylized in all lowercase)	Eve	Hiroyuki Sawano	3:04
Total length:				6:05

Self cover CD
No.	Title	Lyrics	Arrangement	Length
1.	"Glorious Day" (featuring Hatsune Miku)	Eve	Numa; Zingai	3:22
2.	"Memento" (メメント) (featuring Nqrse)	Eve; Nqrse	Eve; Zingai	3:36
Total length:				6:58

Notes

- The collaboration CD and self cover CD are separate discs.
- "Memento" was previously released on June 2, 2024, by VACHSS.

== Charts ==
Chart (2024)	Position
Japanese Albums (Oricon)	5
Japan Hot Albums (Billboard)	5
