= Kaikai Kitan/Ao no Waltz =

- Regular version

EP by Eve
- Released: December 23, 2020
- Studio: Aobadai Studio Inc.
- Genre: J-pop
- Length: 28:50
- Language: Japanese
- Label: Toy's Factory
- Producer: Eve

Eve chronology
Smile (2020)	Kaikai Kitan/Ao no Waltz (2020)	Gunjo Sanka/Yusei Yumeshi (2021)

Singles from Kaikai Kitan/Ao no Waltz
- 1. "Kaikai Kitan" Released: October 3, 2020; 2. "Ao no Waltz" Released: October 24, 2020; 3. "Shinkai" Released: December 4, 2020

Kaikai Kitan/Ao no Waltz (廻廻奇譚/蒼のワルツ; lit. 'Round Round Mysterious Story/Blue Waltz') is the second EP by Japanese singer-songwriter Eve. It was released on December 23, 2020, by Toy's Factory. The EP consists of seven tracks and was supported by three singles: "Kaikai Kitan", "Ao no Waltz and "Shinkai". It is available in three versions: the Jujutsu Kaisen version with a special cover drawn by Sunghoo Park, the Josee, the Tiger and the Fish version with the cover by Nao Emoto and the regular version by Mah.

== Background and release ==
Ten months after his last comeback with the studio album Smile, it was announced on November 4, 2020, that Eve would release his first EP on December 23. The singles "Kaikai Kitan", "Ao no Waltz" and "Shinkai" were previously released as the soundtrack for the anime Jujutsu Kaisen and the movie Josee, the Tiger and the Fish, respectively. On November 20, the music video for "Kaikai Kitan" was released in collaboration with Jujutsu Kaisen. On December 21, the music video for "Ao no Waltz" with scenes from Josee, the Tiger and the Fish and on December 7, the music video for "Shinkai" were released.

The EP was released on December 23 through various music platforms.

== Commercial performance ==
The album sold 34,652 copies in its first week and peaked 3rd on the Oricon Album Chart.

== Track listing ==
All lyrics are written by Eve; all music is composed by Eve.

Kaikai Kitan/Ao no Waltz – Regular edition
No.	Title	Arrangement	Length
1.	"Kaikai Kitan (廻廻奇譚; lit. 'Round Round Mysterious Story')"	Numa	3:41
2.	"Ao no Waltz (蒼のワルツ, Ao no Warutsu) lit. 'Blue Waltz'"	Numa	3:33
3.	"Shinkai (心海; lit. 'Heart Sea')"	Numa	4:26
4.	"Yoi no Myōjō (宵の明星; lit. 'Evening Evening Star')"	Numa	4:16
5.	"Yūyū Meimei (遊遊冥冥; lit. 'Play Play Dark')"	Eve; Numa	3:29
6.	"Yakusoku (約束; lit. 'Promise')"	Numa	4:12
7.	"Byōka (杪夏; lit. 'End of Summer')"	Numa	4:04
Total length:			28:50

== Charts ==
Chart (2020)	Position
Japanese Albums (Oricon)	3
Japan Hot 100 (Billboard)	3

== Sales ==
Region	Certification	Certified units/sales
Japan	—	66,083
