= Crunchyroll Anime Award for Best Opening Sequence =

- Awarded for: Best opening sequence of the previous year
- Country: United States; Japan
- First award: "History Maker" by Dean Fujioka – Yuri on Ice (2017)
- Currently held by: "On the Way" by Aina the End – Dandadan Season 2 (2026)

Highlights
- Most wins: Anime: Attack on Titan / Dandadan (2)
- Most nominations: Anime: Attack on Titan / Jujutsu Kaisen (3)
- Website: Crunchyroll Anime Awards

The Crunchyroll Anime Award for Best Opening Sequence, formerly known as Crunchyroll Anime Award for Best Opening, is a music and sequence award given at the Crunchyroll Anime Awards since its inaugural edition in 2017. It is given for the best opening sequence in an anime series from the previous year. Winners are determined through a combined voting process by judges and public voting.

The opening sequence "History Maker" composed by Dean Fujioka in Yuri on Ice first won the award in 2017. In the latest edition in 2026, "On the Way" performed by Aina the End in the second season of Dandadan won the award.

== Winners and nominees ==
In the following list, the first titles listed in gold are the winners; those not in gold are nominees, which are listed the sequences in alphabetical order. The years given are those in which the ceremonies took place.

=== 2010s ===
Best Opening

Year	Sequence	Anime	Recipient(s)
2016 (1st)
2016 (1st)	"History Maker"	Yuri on Ice	Dean Fujioka
2016 (1st)	"99"	Mob Psycho 100	Mob Choir
2016 (1st)	"Kabaneri of the Iron Fortress"	Kabaneri of the Iron Fortress	Egoist
2016 (1st)	"Usurai Shinjū"	Descending Stories: Showa Genroku Rakugo Shinju	Megumi Hayashibara
2016 (1st)	Most Popular "Other": "Re:Re:"	Erased	Asian Kung-Fu Generation
2017 (2nd)
2017 (2nd)	"Peace Sign"	My Hero Academia (season 2)	Kenshi Yonezu
2017 (2nd)	"Here"	The Ancient Magus' Bride	JUNNA
2017 (2nd)	"Imawa no Shinigami"	Descending Stories: Showa Genroku Rakugo Shinju (season 2)	Megumi Hayashibara
2017 (2nd)	"Shadow and Truth"	ACCA: 13-Territory Inspection Dept.	ONE III NOTES
2017 (2nd)	"Shinzō wo Sasageyo!"	Attack on Titan (season 2)	Linked Horizon
2017 (2nd)	"The Other Side of the Wall"	Princess Principal	Void_Chords feat. MARU

Best Opening Sequence

Year	Sequence	Anime	Recipient(s)
2018 (3rd)
2018 (3rd)	"Kiss of Death"	Darling in the Franxx	Mika Nakashima x Hyde
2018 (3rd)	"Aggretsuko"	Aggretsuko	Miura Jam
2018 (3rd)	"Deal with the Devil"	Kakegurui – Compulsive Gambler	Tia
2018 (3rd)	"Fiction"	Wotakoi: Love Is Hard for Otaku	Sumika
2018 (3rd)	"Fighting Gold"	JoJo's Bizarre Adventure: Golden Wind (season 4)	Coda
2018 (3rd)	"Pop Team Epic"	Pop Team Epic	Sumire Uesaka
2019 (4th)
2019 (4th)	"99.9"	Mob Psycho 100 II (season 2)	Mob Choir feat. Sajou no Hana
2019 (4th)	"Inferno"	Fire Force	Mrs. Green Apple
2019 (4th)	"Kawaki wo Ameku"	Domestic Girlfriend	Minami
2019 (4th)	"Kiss Me"	Carole & Tuesday	Nai Br.XX & Celeina Ann
2019 (4th)	"Mukanjyo"	Vinland Saga	Survive Said The Prophet
2019 (4th)	"Touch Off"	The Promised Neverland	UVERworld

=== 2020s ===
Year	Sequence	Anime	Recipient(s)
2020 (5th)
2020 (5th)	"Wild Side"	Beastars	ALI
2020 (5th)	"DADDY! DADDY! DO!"	Kaguya-sama: Love Is War? (season 2)	Masayuki Suzuki feat. Airi Suzuki
2020 (5th)	"Easy Breezy"	Keep Your Hands Off Eizouken!	chelmico
2020 (5th)	"G.P."	Great Pretender	Yutaka Yamada
2020 (5th)	"Kaikai Kitan"	Jujutsu Kaisen	Eve
2020 (5th)	"Phoenix"	Haikyu!! To the Top (season 4)	Burnout Syndromes
2021 (6th)
2021 (6th)	"Boku no Sensou"	Attack on Titan: The Final Season Part 1 (season 4)	Shinsei Kamattechan, storyboard and direction by Yuichiro Hayashi
2021 (6th)	"Ai no Supreme!"	Miss Kobayashi's Dragon Maid S	Fhána, storyboard and direction by Tatsuya Ishihara
2021 (6th)	"Cry Baby"	Tokyo Revengers	Official Hige Dandism
2021 (6th)	"Kaibutsu"	Beastars (season 2)	Yoasobi
2021 (6th)	"ODDTAXI"	Odd Taxi	Skirt and PUNPEE, storyboard and direction by Ryoji Yamada
2021 (6th)	"Vivid Vice"	Jujutsu Kaisen (cour 2)	Who-ya Extended, storyboard and direction by Shingo Yamashita
2021/2022 (7th)
2021/2022 (7th)	"The Rumbling"	Attack on Titan: The Final Season Part 2 (season 4 cour 2)	SiM, storyboard and direction by Takashi Kojima
2021/2022 (7th)	"Chikichiki Banban"	Ya Boy Kongming!	QUEENDOM, storyboard and direction by 10GAUGE
2021/2022 (7th)	"Mixed Nuts"	Spy × Family	Official Hige Dandism, storyboard and direction by Masashi Ishihama
2021/2022 (7th)	"Hadaka no Yūsha"	Ranking of Kings (cour 2)	Vaundy, storyboard and direction by Shingo Yamashita
2021/2022 (7th)	"This Fffire"	Cyberpunk: Edgerunners	Franz Ferdinand, direction by Hiroyuki Imaishi, storyboard by Kai Ikarashi
2021/2022 (7th)	"Zankyōsanka"	Demon Slayer: Kimetsu no Yaiba Entertainment District Arc (season 2 cour 2)	Aimer, direction by Akira Matsushima, storyboard by Haruo Sotozaki
2022/2023 (8th)
2022/2023 (8th)	"Where Our Blue Is"	Jujutsu Kaisen (season 2)	Tatsuya Kitani, storyboard and direction by Yuki Kamiya
2022/2023 (8th)	"Idol"	Oshi no Ko	Yoasobi, storyboard and direction by Yusuke Yamamoto
2022/2023 (8th)	"Innocent Arrogance"	Heavenly Delusion	Bish, storyboard and direction by Weilin Zhang
2022/2023 (8th)	"Kick Back"	Chainsaw Man	Kenshi Yonezu, storyboard and direction by Shingo Yamashita
2022/2023 (8th)	"Song of the Dead"	Zom 100: Bucket List of the Dead	Kana-Boon, storyboard and direction by Kazuki Kawagoe
2022/2023 (8th)	"Work"	Hell's Paradise	Ringo Sheena and Millennium Parade, storyboard and direction by Kamata
2023/2024 (9th)
2023/2024 (9th)	"Otonoke"	Dandadan	Creepy Nuts, storyboard and direction by Abel Góngora
2023/2024 (9th)	"Abyss"	Kaiju No. 8	Yungblud, direction by Kohei Nakajima and Hibiki Yoshizaki
2023/2024 (9th)	"Bling-Bang-Bang-Born"	Mashle: Magic and Muscles The Divine Visionary Candidate Exam Arc (season 2)	Creepy Nuts, storyboard and direction by Shun Enokido
2023/2024 (9th)	"Fatal"	Oshi no Ko (season 2)	Gemn, storyboard and direction by Ryōhei Takeshita
2023/2024 (9th)	"Level"	Solo Leveling	SawanoHiroyuki[nZk]: Tomorrow X Together, storyboard and direction by Choi In-seung
2023/2024 (9th)	"Uuuuus!"	One Piece	Hiroshi Kitadani, storyboard and direction by Megumi Ishitani
2025 (10th)
2025 (10th)	"On the Way"	Dandadan (season 2)	Aina the End, storyboard and direction by MicAOz
2025 (10th)	"Hugs"	Gachiakuta	Paledusk, storyboard and direction by Nobutaka Yoda
2025 (10th)	"Mirage"	Call of the Night (season 2)	Creepy Nuts, storyboard and direction by Tetsuya Miyanishi
2025 (10th)	"Reawaker"	Solo Leveling: Arise from the Shadow (season 2)	LiSA feat. Felix of Stray Kids, storyboard and direction by Shunsuke Nakashige
2025 (10th)	"The Revo"	My Hero Academia: Final Season (season 8)	Porno Graffitti, storyboard by Naomi Nakayama, direction by Masayuki Otsuki
2025 (10th)	"Watch Me!"	Witch Watch	Yoasobi, storyboard and direction by Megumi Ishitani

== Records ==
=== Anime series ===
Franchise	Wins	Nominations	Seasons
Attack on Titan	2	3	Season 2, The Final Season Part 1, The Final Season Part 2
Dandadan	2		Season 1, Season 2
Jujutsu Kaisen	1	3	Season 1 cour 1, Season 1 cour 2, Season 2
Beastars	1	2	Season 1, Season 2
Mob Psycho 100	1	2	Season 1, Season 2
My Hero Academia	1	2	Season 2, Final Season
Descending Stories: Showa Genroku Rakugo Shinju	0	2	Season 1, Season 2
Oshi no Ko	0	2	Season 1, Season 2
Solo Leveling	0	2	Season 1, Arise from the Shadow

=== Artist ===
Artist	Wins	Nominations	Anime
Creepy Nuts	1	3	Call of the Night (Season 2), Dandadan, Mashle: Magic and Muscles (The Divine Visionary Candidate Exam Arc)
Kenshi Yonezu	1	2	Chainsaw Man, My Hero Academia (Season 2)
Mob Choir	1	2	Mob Psycho 100 (Season 1, Season 2)
Yoasobi	0	3	Beastars (Season 2), Oshi no Ko, Witch Watch
Megumi Hayashibara	0	2	Descending Stories: Showa Genroku Rakugo Shinju (Season 1, Season 2)
Official Hige Dandism	0	2	Spy × Family, Tokyo Revengers
