= Tatsuya Kitani discography =

This is the discography of Japanese musician Tatsuya Kitani.

== Studio albums ==
Title	Album details	Peak chart positions	
Title	Album details	JPN	JPN Hot
I Do (Not) Love You.	Released: 26 September 2018; Label: Emo, Alternative & Cool.; Formats: CD, digital download, streaming	—	—
Seven Girls’ H(e)avens	Released: 25 September 2019; Label: Emo, Alternative & Cool.; Formats: CD, digital download, streaming	—	91
Demagog	Released: 26 August 2020; Label: Mastersix Foundation; Formats: CD, digital download, streaming	46	43
Bipolar	Released: 25 May 2022; Label: Mastersix Foundation; Formats: CD, digital download, streaming	23	20
Roundabout	Released: 10 January 2024; Label: Mastersix Foundation; Formats: CD, digital download, streaming	9	8
Dekai	Released: 4 November 2026; Label: Echoes; Formats: CD, CD+Blu-ray digital download, streaming	15	40
Pure	Released: 4 November 2026; Label: Echoes; Formats: CD, CD+Blu-ray digital download, streaming	14	13

== Extended plays ==
Title	EP details	Peak chart positions	
Title	EP details	JPN	JPN Hot
Scar (スカー)	Released: 23 November 2022; Label: Sony Music Records; Formats: CD, digital download	21	21
Love: Amplified	Released: 14 June 2023; Label: Sony Music Records; Formats: Digital download	— (Note: Love: Amplified did not enter the Oricon Albums Chart, but it peaked at number 12 on the Oricon Digital Albums Sales Chart.)	—
Where Our Blue Is	Released: 19 July 2023; Label: Sony Music Records; Formats: CD, digital download	6 (Note: Where Our Blue Is charted on the Oricon Singles Chart.)	—

== Singles ==
Title	Year	Peak chart positions						Certifications	Album
Title	Year	JPN	JPN Cmb.	JPN Hot	TWN	US World	WW	Certifications	Album
"Sad Girl"	2019	—	—	—	—	—	—		Seven Girls’ H(e)avens
"Club Unreality" (クラブ・アンリアリティ)	2019	—	—	—	—	—	—		Seven Girls’ H(e)avens
"Hide and Seek" (ハイドアンドシーク)	2020	—	—	—	—	—	—		Demagog
"Bad Dream" (悪夢)	2020	—	—	—	—	—	—		Demagog
"Slush" (白無垢)	2020	—	—	—	—	—	—		Non-album singles
"Cinnamon"	2021	—	—	—	—	—	—		Non-album singles
"Accomplices" (逃走劇)	2021	—	—	—	—	—	—		Non-album singles
"Ghost!?"	2021	—	—	—	—	—	—		Non-album singles
"When the Weak Go Marching In" (聖者の行進)	2021	45	—	—	—	—	—		Bipolar
"Rapport"	2021	—	—	—	—	—	—		Bipolar
"Thanatophobia" (タナトフォビア)	2021	—	—	—	—	—	—		Bipolar
"Inner Whirlpool" (冷たい渦)	2021	—	—	—	—	—	—		Bipolar
"Two Drifters" (プラネテス)	2021	—	—	—	—	—	—		Bipolar
"Chiharu" (ちはる) (featuring N-buna of Yorushika)	2022	—	—	—	—	—	—		Non-album single
"Moonlight" (月光) (featuring Harumaki Gohan)	2022	—	—	—	—	—	—		Roundabout
"Scar" (スカー)	2022	—	—	93	—	—	—		Roundabout
"Bakeneko" (化け猫)	2022	—	—	—	—	—	—		Roundabout
"Where Our Blue Is" (青のすみか)	2023	6	3	2	15	13	85	RIAJ: Gold (dig.); 3× Platinum (st.); RIAA: Gold	Roundabout
"As I Longed For" (憧れのままに) (with Yama)	2023	—	—	—	—	—	—		Awake&Build
"Moonthief"	2023	—	—	—	—	—	—		Roundabout
"Night Routine" (ナイトルーティーン)	2023	—	—	—	—	—	—		Roundabout
"Preview of Me" (次回予告)	2024	37	—	—	—	—	—		Dekai
"Always Be with You XD" (ずうっといっしょ!)	2024	—	—	—	—	—	—	RIAJ: Gold (st.)	Pure
"Fatal" (ファタール) (with Kento Nakajima as Gemn)	2024	5	2	3	—	—	— (Note: "Fatal" did not enter the Billboard Global 200, but peaked at number 157 on the Global Excl. US.)	RIAJ: Platinum (st.)	Dekai
"Chained" (いらないもの) (with Natori)	2024	30	—	95	—	—	—		Pure
"Whisper" (ウィスパー)	2024	—	—	—	—	—	—		Dekai
"You More" (ユーモア)	2025	—	—	—	—	—	—		Pure
"Tell Me About You" (あなたのことをおしえて)	2025	—	—	—	—	—	—		Dekai
"Lost and Found" (なくしもの)	2025	—	—	—	—	—	—		Dekai
"Your Gaze, Crepuscular" (まなざしは光)	2025	36	—	—	—	—	—		Dekai
"Culture" (カルチャー)	2025	—	—	—	—	—	—		Dekai
"Kasuka na Hana" (かすかなはな) (featuring Babymetal)	2026	17	—	47	—	—	—		Pure
"Hidane" (火種)	2026	23	47	33	—	—	—		Dekai
"Levitation" (れびてーしょん)	2026	45	—	—	—	—	—		Pure
"Final Draft" (遺書)	2026	—	—	—	—	—	—		Pure
"F.A.C.E."	2026	—	—	—	—	—	—		Dekai
"Emerald" (エメラルド)	2026	—	—	—	—	—	—		Pure
"Wanna Live and Die with You!" (君と生きて君と死にたい!)	2026	—	—	85	—	—	—		Pure
"—" denotes releases that did not chart or were not released in that region.

== "Leaks From His Laptop" demo singles ==
Title	Year	Album
"Heaven's Turnstiles" (天国の改札)	2021	Non-album single
"Even As An Adult" (大人になっても)	2021	Non-album single
"Cute Aggression" (キュートアグレッション)	2021	Non-album single
"Ode to Joy" (よろこびのうた)	2021	Non-album single
