= Where Our Blue Is =

EP by Tatsuya Kitani
- Released: July 19, 2023
- Genres: J-pop; anime song
- Length: 12:30
- Language: Japanese
- Label: Mastersix Foundation

Singles from Where Our Blue Is
- 1. "Where Our Blue Is" Released: July 7, 2023

Alternative cover
- First press limited edition front cover, featuring Satoru Gojo

Alternative cover
- First press limited edition back cover, featuring Suguru Geto

Music video
- Where Our Blue Is on YouTube

Where Our Blue Is (Note: The official English translated title.) (青のすみか, Ao no Sumika; lit. 'House of Blue') is the third EP by Japanese singer-songwriter Tatsuya Kitani. It was released on July 19, 2023, by Mastersix Foundation. The title track serves as the third overall opening theme song for the Jujutsu Kaisen anime television series.

== Overview ==
It was released in two editions: the standard edition and the first press limited edition. The standard edition includes the title song, the self-cover version of the song "Love Song (featuring Eve)", and two other tracks. The first press limited edition includes the DVD of the live performance of the one-man tour "Unknot/Reknot" held at Zepp DiverCity (Tokyo) on October 15, 2022. On June 26, the EP was available to pre-order on iTunes and pre-add or pre-save on Apple Music and Spotify. While the standard edition features a cover of two hands touching one another, the first press edition front and back covers show Jujutsu Kaisen character Satoru Gojo and Suguru Geto instead. Anichoice praised the design of the cover.

The title track "Where Our Blue Is" was pre-released as a single worldwide on July 7, 2023. It peaked at number two in the Billboard Japan Hot 100, the Billboard Japan Download Songs chart, and the Billboard Japan Streaming Songs chart. The music video for it was released on YouTube on July 13, 2023. It was filmed in the desert of Dubai.

== Composition ==
The song is based on the concept of "farewell peculiar to youth". In producing the music, Kitani received an offer from the anime production side, "A song with a refreshing impression based on the theme of youth". He said it was difficult. The school chime (Westminster Quarters) phrase is used in part of the song. Revealing the changes that have sprouted in order to save memories of youth and "deliver".

Kitani was able to quickly create something like the first seed for "Where Our Blue Is", but it was difficult after that. The first arrangement of this song was completely different, with a slower BPM, more sad elements, and a bit of a guitar on a club beat. The singer tried to make a version that was closer to that, and what he came up with was a guitar rock with a fast BPM and a sense of speed. When asking the director to listen to those two, he said, "It's about the middle." After all, the melody and lyrics are the same, but the finished product is different. Eve's "Kaikai Kitan" was a major inspiration for the song. "Scar", which he wrote as the first opening theme song for the Bleach: Thousand-Year Blood War anime television series, is one of them, and when he was writing the chorus of "Where Our Blue Is", Kitani was thinking about that. Straight as much as possible, twisted in other places. At the beginning of the song, there is a sound like "Corn!" which makes the listener feel like they are back in the womb. When people put in that kind of sound effect to attract the listener and help them grow up.

For Jujutsu Kaisen, the video primarily deals with the youth of Gojo and Geto, with an emphasis on blue backgrounds, like the lyrics say. The opening contrasts with the ending theme, "Akari", which uses a more relaxed melody and also makes emphasis on Gojo and Geto's friendship. Collab Cafe praised the opening as it will make people listen to it several times.

== Accolades ==
Awards and nominations for "Where Our Blue Is"
Ceremony	Year	Award	Result	Ref.
Anime Grand Prix	2024	Best Theme Song	3rd place	
Crunchyroll Anime Awards	2024	Best Anime Song	Nominated	
Crunchyroll Anime Awards	2024	Best Opening Sequence	Won	
Japan Expo Awards	2024	Daruma for Best Opening	Nominated	

== Track listing ==
All tracks are written by Tatsuya Kitani.

Where Our Blue Is standard edition
No.	Title	Length
1.	"Where Our Blue Is (青のすみか, Ao no Sumika)"	3:17
2.	"Have a nice end! (素敵なしゅうまつを！, Suteki na Shūmatsu wo！)"	3:11
3.	"Love Song (ラブソング, Rabu Songu)" (cover)	2:45
4.	"Where Our Blue Is (青のすみか, Ao no Sumika)" (instrumental)	3:17
Total length:		12:30

Where Our Blue Is first press limited edition – disc 2 (Blu-ray) One Man Tour "Unknot / Reknot" live at Zepp DiverCity (Tokyo) 2022.10.15
No.	Title	Length
1.	"Rapport"
2.	"How the Devil Dances (悪魔の踊り方, Akuma no Odorikata)"
3.	"Pink"
4.	"A Sleepwalker Gazing on Nirvana (夢遊病者は此岸にて, Muyūbyōsha wa Shigan Nite)"
5.	"Humanlike (人間みたいね, Ningen Mitai ne)"
6.	"Two Creatures (愛のけだもの, Ai no Kedamono)"
7.	"Inner Whirlpool (冷たい渦, Tsumetai Uzu)"
8.	"Gomi no Heya wa Sabiiro ni Shizumu (芥の部屋は錆色に沈む)"
9.	"Demagog (デマゴーグ, Demagōgu)"
10.	"Nami ni Namaewotsukeru Koto, Bokura no Kokyū ni Owari ga Aru Koto. (波に名前をつけること、僕らの呼吸に終わりがあること。)"
11.	"Until You Go Back to the Night Sea (君が夜の海に還るまで, Kimi ga Yoru no Umi ni Kaeru Made)"
12.	"Chiharu (ちはる)"
13.	"Two Drifters (プラネテス, Planetes)"
14.	"Scar (スカー, Sukā)"
15.	"Kyōkotsu na Kyūsai wo Matsu Minikusa Niwa Hitohira no Kyōchikutō wo (軽忽な救済を待つ醜さには一片の夾竹桃を)"
16.	"Thanatophobia (タナトフォビア, Tanatofobia)"
17.	"Can't Stop Breathing (それでも僕らの呼吸は止まない, Soredemo Bokura no Kokyū wa Yamanai)"
18.	"When the Weak Go Marching In (聖者の行進, Seija no Kōshin)"

== Personnel ==
Where Our Blue Is

- Tatsuya Kitani – lyrics, music, vocals, arrangement, programming, bass guitar, guitar
- Osamu Hidai – drums
- Tetsuya Hirahata – piano
- Norio Teruuchi – mixing engineer

Have a nice end!

- Tatsuya Kitani – lyrics, music, vocals, arrangement, bass guitar
- Mizore – arrangement, programming, guitar
- Masashi Uramoto – mixing engineer

Love Song (cover)

- Tatsuya Kitani – lyrics, music, vocals, programming, arrangement, bass guitar, guitar
- Masashi Uramoto – mixing engineer

Where Our Blue Is (instrumental)

- Tatsuya Kitani – music, arrangement, all other instruments
- Tetsuya Hirahata – piano
- Osamu Hidai – drums
- Norikatsu Terūchi – mixing engineer

All tracks mastered by Hidekazu Sakai. All tracks recorded and mixed at Sony Music Studios Tokyo (Minato, Tokyo, Japan)

== Charts ==
=== Weekly charts ===
Weekly chart performance for "Where Our Blue Is"
Chart (2023)	Peak position
Global 200 (Billboard)	85
Japan (Japan Hot 100)	2
Japan Hot Animation (Billboard Japan)	2
Japan (Oricon)	6
Japan Combined Singles (Oricon)	3
Taiwan (Billboard)	2
US World Digital Song Sales (Billboard)	13

=== Monthly charts ===
Monthly chart performance for "Where Our Blue Is"
Chart (2023)	Position
Japan (Oricon)	33

=== Year-end charts ===
2023 year-end chart performance for "Where Our Blue Is"
Chart (2023)	Position
Japan (Japan Hot 100)	24
Japan Hot Animation (Billboard Japan)	9
Japan Digital Singles (Oricon)	7

2024 year-end chart performance for "Where Our Blue Is"
Chart (2024)	Position
Japan (Japan Hot 100)	26
Japan Hot Animation (Billboard Japan)	9

== Certifications ==
Certifications for "Where Our Blue Is"
Region	Certification	Certified units/sales
Japan (RIAJ) Digital	Gold	100,000^{*}
United States (RIAA)	Gold	500,000^{‡}
Streaming
Japan (RIAJ)	3× Platinum	300,000,000^{†}
^{*} Sales figures based on certification alone.^{‡} Sales+streaming figures based on certification alone.^{†} Streaming-only figures based on certification alone.
