= Eve (Japanese singer) =

Japanese singer-songwriter (born 1995)

- Born: 23 May 1995 (age 31)
- Genres: J-pop; rock
- Occupations: Singer; songwriter; producer
- Years active: 2009–present
- Labels: Harapeco; Toy's Factory; Echoes
- Website: eveofficial.com

Eve (Note: Japanese: いぶ, romanized: Ibu, stylized as E ve; formerly known as Keitora (けいとら) and Kurowa (クロわ).) (born 23 May 1995) is a Japanese singer-songwriter and Vocaloid producer. He entered the music industry by singing covers of popular songs on Niconico.

He signed to Toy's Factory in 2019, moving away from his independently owned label, Harapeco Records, which Eve had produced under since the release of his debut album, Wonder Word. He was also a guest in "School of Lock!" by Tokyo FM.

His style of music was reportedly influenced by pop culture, such as movies.

His music has been featured as the theme song for various anime, such as "Dark Night" (闇夜) for Dororo, "Kaikai Kitan" (廻廻奇譚; lit. 'Round Round Mysterious Story') for Jujutsu Kaisen, "Ao No Waltz" (蒼のワルツ; lit. 'Blue Waltz') for Josee, the Tiger and the Fish, "Fight Song" (ファイトソング, Faito Songu) for Chainsaw Man, "Bokurano" (ぼくらの; lit. 'Our') for My Hero Academia, "Teenage Blue" (ティーンエージブルー, Tīnēji Burū) for Blue Box, "Kaze no Anthem" (風のアンセム, Anthem of Wind) for Witch Hat Atelier, and "AIYOU" for The Apothecary Diaries.

== Career ==
=== 2009–2018: Early years ===
Eve began his career on the Japanese video-sharing service, Niconico in October 2009. His first cover was released on Niconico on 1 October 2009, singing "TRAGIC BOY". Kurowa and Keitora were his previous names on Niconico, before he began to use his current name.

From 2012 to 2013, Eve was the lead vocalist for the Japanese indie band Einie, alongside Natsushiro Takaaki, another well-known Vocaloid musician within the utaite (歌い手) community. Afterward, Eve was a member of a group called "Riot of Color" in 2014, before releasing his debut album, Wonder Word, on 14 August 2014.

Eve followed Wonder Word with Round Robin in 2015, before releasing Official Number in 2016. Official Number was his first charting album at the time, peaking at 35 and 99 on the Oricon Albums Chart and Billboard Japan Hot 100.

Following the success of Official Number, Eve released Bunka (文化; lit. 'Culture') on 13 December 2017, which peaked at 14 and 33 on the Oricon Albums Chart and Billboard Japan Hot 100, respectively.

On 7 March 2018, Eve released Blue (蒼), a collaboration album alongside Sou.

=== 2019–2022: Major debut and Kaizin ===
In 2019, Eve signed to Toy's Factory. On 6 February 2019, Eve released Otogi (おとぎ; lit. 'Fairy'), his first major album with the label. Otogi was Eve's highest chart position at the time, peaking at 6 and 4 on the Oricon Albums Chart and the Billboard Japan Hot 100 respectively.

Eve followed Otogi with Smile, his most successful album by chart position to date, on 12 February 2020. Smile peaked at 2 and 3 on the Oricon Albums Chart and the Billboard Japan Hot 100 respectively. Following the release of Smile, Eve released his second EP, Kaikai Kitan/Ao no Waltz on 23 December 2020. The EP was preceded by three singles: "Kaikai Kitan", "Ao no Waltz" and "Shinkai", which were used as the soundtrack for the anime Jujutsu Kaisen and the movie Josee, the Tiger and the Fish respectively.

On 25 January 2022, Netflix announced a musical film, Adam by Eve: A Live in Animation, a collaboration project with Eve. The film featured various scores produced by Eve and had a runtime of 60 minutes. The film premiered on 15 March 2022 and also had a limited theatrical release in Japan. A day after the release of the film, his third major album Kaizin (廻人, Kaijin), was released. The album peaked at 4 on the Oricon Albums Chart. In the following month, he performed the title track for the anime film Bubble alongside Riria. His single "Fight Song" (ファイトソング, Faito Songu) used as the 12th ending theme song for the anime series Chainsaw Man, and released digitally on 28 December 2022.

=== 2023–present: First foreign tour and Under Blue ===
In January 2023, Eve released "Bokurano" (ぼくらの; lit. 'Our'), the opening theme for the second part of the sixth season of My Hero Academia. A Bokurano EP was released on 22 March 2023.

Eve collaborated with composer Hiroyuki Sawano on a song titled "Pray" released on 13 January 2024, and it was featured as the ending theme song for the 2024 television drama Innai Keisatsu.

In May 2024, Eve began touring outside of Japan with his first Asia tour "Eve Asia Tour 2024 Culture", beginning in Hong Kong.

Throughout 2024, Eve continued releasing singles and performing songs with tie-ins including "Insomnia" and "Sweet Memory" for My Home Hero (live action) and Shōshimin Series respectively. On 20 August 2024, Eve announced his next album titled Under Blue. In October 2024, Eve performed the single "Teenage Blue" as the ending theme song for the anime series Blue Box.

Under Blue, Eve's fourth major album, was released on 27 November 2024. On the same day, a music video for "Lazy Cat", the first track on Under Blue was released.

In 2026, Eve contributed with Suis from Yorushika the song "Kaze no Anthem" (風のアンセム, Anthem of Wind), as the opening theme for the anime Witch Hat Atelier.

== Other ventures ==
Eve created a clothing brand named Harapeco in 2016, and currently manages, designs, and sells unisex apparel and accessories. Eve also manages a second Store, named Eve Official Store, where he sells different types of music and tour-related merchandise that includes clothing and accessories.

He created and published a manga, Kara no Kioku, illustrated by Newo, on 15 April 2020. The manga currently has 32 chapters through 4 Volumes, the most recent volume being released on 27 December 2022.

Alongside the manga, Eve is also writing a light novel, named How to Eat Life, of which was announced on 1 August 2022 on Eve's Twitter page. Volume 1 proceeded to release on 22 September 2022. Volume 2 was also being worked on at the time. Volume 2 proceeded to release on 11 January 2023, with an attached announcement that Volume 1 of the Novel would be proceeding with a reprint. The announcement was made by MF Bunko J, a novel publishing label, affiliated with Media Factory. Volume 3 was released afterwards, on 26 May 2023.

Eve also streams on TwitCasting.

== Discography ==
=== Studio albums ===
List of studio albums, with selected details and chart positions
Title	Details	Peak chart positions		
Title	Details	JPN	JPN Comb (Note: The Oricon Combined Albums Chart was established on 24 December 2018.)	JPN Hot
Round Robin	Released: 16 August 2015; Label: Self-released; Formats: CD, digital download, streaming	—	—	—
Official Number	Released: 19 October 2016; Label: Harapeco Records; Formats: CD, digital download, streaming	35	—	99
Bunka	Released: 13 December 2017; Label: Harapeco Records; Formats: CD, digital download, streaming	14	—	33
Otogi	Released: 6 February 2019; Label: Toy's Factory; Formats: CD, digital download, streaming	6	5	4
Smile	Released: 12 February 2020; Label: Toy's Factory; Formats: CD, digital download, streaming	2	2	3
Eve Vocaloid 01	Released: 9 February 2022; Label: Toy's Factory; Formats: Digital download, streaming	—	—	72
Kaizin	Released: 16 March 2022; Label: Toy's Factory; Formats: CD, digital download, streaming	4	4	5
Under Blue	Released: 27 November 2024; Label: Toy's Factory; Formats: CD, digital download, streaming	5	5	5
"—" denotes releases which did not chart.

=== Extended plays ===
List of extended plays, with selected details and chart positions
Title	Details	Peak chart positions		
Title	Details	JPN	JPN Comb (Note: The Oricon Combined Albums Chart was established on 24 December 2018.)	JPN Hot
Wonder Word	Released: 17 August 2014; Label: Self-released; Formats: CD, digital download, streaming	—	—	—
Kaikai Kitan/Ao no Waltz (廻廻奇譚 / 蒼のワルツ)	Released: 23 December 2020; Label: Toy's Factory; Formats: CD, digital download, streaming	3	3	3
Bokurano (ぼくらの)	Released: 21 March 2023; Label: Toy's Factory; Formats: CD, digital download, streaming	—	—	—
"—" denotes releases which did not chart.

=== Collaboration albums ===
List of collaboration albums, with selected details and chart positions
Title	Details	Peak chart positions	
Title	Details	JPN	JPN Hot
Oyasumi (Good Night) (Eve & Yurin)	Released: 30 December 2014; Label: Self-released; Formats: CD, digital download, streaming	—	—
Ao (蒼) (Eve × Sou)	Released: 28 February 2018; Label: Harapeco Records; Formats: CD, digital download, streaming	7	11
"—" denotes releases which did not chart.

=== Singles ===
List of singles, showing year released, selected chart positions, certifications, and album name
Title	Year	Peak chart positions			Certifications	Album
Title	Year	JPN Comb (Note: The Oricon Combined Singles Chart was established on 24 December 2018.)	JPN Hot	WW	Certifications	Album
"Nonsense Bungaku" (ナンセンス文学)	2017	—	—	—		Bunka
"Anoko Secret" (あの娘シークレット)	2017	—	—	—		Bunka
"Yamiyo" (闇夜)	2019	—	31	—		Smile
"Raison D'être" (レーゾンデートル)	2019	—	45	—		Smile
"Hakugin" (白銀)	2019	—	88	—		Smile
"Kaikai Kitan" (廻廻奇譚)	2020	7	7	111	RIAJ: 3× Platinum (st.)	Kaikai Kitan / Ao no Waltz and Kaizin
"Yakusoku" (約束)	2020	—	—	—		Kaikai Kitan / Ao no Waltz
"Shinkai" (心海)	2020	—	—	—		Kaikai Kitan / Ao no Waltz and Kaizin
"Ao no Waltz" (蒼のワルツ)	2020	—	—	—		Kaikai Kitan / Ao no Waltz and Kaizin
"Heikousen" (平行線) (featuring Suis of Yorushika)	2021	—	38	—		Kaizin
"Yoruwahonoka" (夜は仄か)	2021	—	54	—		Kaizin
"Aisai" (藍才)	2021	—	—	—		Kaizin
"Avant" (アヴァン)	2022	—	50	—		Kaizin
"Bubble" (featuring Uta)	2022	—	41	—		Under Blue
"Shirayuki" (白雪)	2022	—	69	—		Under Blue
"Fight Song" (ファイトソング)	2022	29	26	—		Under Blue
"Bokurano" (ぼくらの)	2023	5	42	—		Under Blue
"Boukenroku" (冒険録)	2023	—	—	—		Under Blue
"Hanaarashi" (花嵐)	2023	—	—	—		Under Blue
"Touhikou" (逃避行)	2023	—	—	—		Under Blue
"Pray"	2024	—	—	—		Under Blue
"Insomnia" (インソムニア)	2024	—	89	—		Under Blue
"Glorious Day" (featuring Hatsune Miku)	2024	—	—	—		Under Blue
"Like the Flatwoods Monster" (フラットウッズのモンスターみたいに) (with Deu of People 1)	2024	—	—	—		Under Blue
"Sweet Memory" (スイートメモリー)	2024	—	—	—		Under Blue
"The Rewind Story" (巻物語)	2024	—	—	—		Under Blue
"Teenage Blue" (ティーンエイジブルー)	2024	—	—	—		Under Blue
"Feel Like"	2025	—	—	—		Non-album singles
"Ghost Avenue" (ゴーストアベニュー)	2025	—	68	—		Non-album singles
"Iolite" (アイオライト)	2025	—	—	—		Non-album singles
"Underdog"	2025	—	—	—		Non-album singles
"Wind's Anthem" (風のアンセム) (featuring Suis of Yorushika)	2026	—	—	—		Non-album singles
"Abyss in the World" (あびすいんざわーるど)	2026	—	—	—		Non-album singles
"Aiyou"	2026	—	—	—		Non-album singles
"—" denotes releases which did not chart or were not released in that region.

==== Promotional singles ====
List of promotional singles, showing year released, selected chart positions, and album name
Title	Year	Peak chart positions	Album
Title	Year	JPN Hot	Album
"Dramaturgy" (ドラマツルギー)	2017	—	Bunka
"Okinimesumama" (お気に召すまま)	2017	—	Bunka
"Bokuramadaunderground" (僕らまだアンダーグラウンド)	2019	29	Otogi
"Kokoro Yohou" (心予報)	2020	32	Smile
"Yuseiboushi" (遊生夢死)	2021	—	Kaizin
"Taikutsuwo Saienshinaide" (退屈を再演しないで)	2022	—	Kaizin
"—" denotes releases which did not chart.

=== Other charted songs ===
List of promotional singles, showing year released, selected chart positions, and album name
Title	Year	Peak chart positions	Album
Title	Year	JPN Hot	Album
"Wakusei Loop" (惑星ループ)	2016	97	Official Number

== Music videos ==
Released	Song title	Animator(s)/director(s)	Production company	Notes
18 October 2016	Demon Dance Tokyo	Mah Hirano	—N/a	
2 December 2016	Sister	Avogado6	—N/a	
5 May 2017	Literary Nonsense	Mah Hirano	—N/a	
15 July 2017	The Secret About That Girl	Sayuri Okamoto	TriF Studio	
11 October 2017	Dramaturgy	Mah Hirano	—N/a	
27 November 2017	As You Like It	Waboku	—N/a	
25 February 2018	Instant Heaven	Norainu	—N/a	With Akari Nanawo
7 April 2018	Outsider	Mah Hirano	—N/a	
6 July 2018	Tokyo Ghetto	Waboku	—N/a	
24 August 2018	Ambivalent	Sayuri Okamoto	—N/a	
14 December 2018	Last Dance	Mah Hirano	—N/a	
24 January 2019	We're Still Underground	Nobutaka Yoda	Wit Studio	
20 April 2019	This World to You	Nobutaka Yoda	Wit Studio	
24 June 2019	Dark night	Mah Hirano, Waboku	Twin Engine Digital Studio	
29 August 2019	Baumkuchen End	Waboku	—N/a	
10 October 2019	Raison d'être	Ryū Nakayama	Enishiya	
20 January 2020	Heart Forecast	Nobutaka Yoda	Enishiya	
15 February 2020	LEO	Mah Hirano	—N/a	
28 February 2020	Snow	Ryōsuke Sawa	Pancake	
22 May 2020	How to Devour Life	Mariyasu	—N/a	
23 October 2020	Promise	Ken Yamamoto	CloverWorks	
20 November 2020	Kaikai Kitan	Yūichirō Saeki	MAPPA	
7 December 2020	Shinkai	Mariyasu	Bones	
21 December 2020	Ao no Waltz	Nobutaka Yoda	Bones	
6 February 2021	Heikousen	Nobutaka Yoda	10Gauge, Studio Durian	With suis from Yorushika
26 March 2021	Kaikai Kitan (Live Film ver)	Yoshiharu Ota, Satoshi Tani	—N/a	
30 April 2021	Night is Faint	zemyata	—N/a	
10 September 2021	Living Idly and Dying as If Dreaming	niL	—N/a	
30 September 2021	Ultramarine Hymn	くっか	—N/a	
24 December 2021	Aisai	Glens sou	—N/a	
11 March 2022	Don't replay the boredom.	Waboku	—N/a	
18 March 2022	YOKU	Yoneyama Mai	Wit Studio	
28 April 2022	Bubble	Araki Tetsuro	Wit Studio	
23 May 2022	Mob	Hibiki Yoshizaki	Khara	
30 August 2022	Kaikai Kitan (Adam by Eve ver.)	Yūichirō Saeki	—N/a	
23 December 2022	White Snow	Haruka Fujita	CloverWorks	
28 December 2022	Fight Song	Mariyasu	—N/a	
24 February 2023	Bokurano	Waboku	Folium LLC	
11 August 2023	Adventure Log	MimicryMeta	—N/a	
27 August 2023	Kororon	Ligton	—N/a	
1 October 2023	Flower Storm	Kutsuka	StudioXD	
23 November 2023	Avant	Eke	—N/a	
24 December 2023	Tohiko	Ten to Ten	—N/a	
4 February 2024	pray	YKBX	Ai Takahashi(TFC)	
9 March 2024	Glorious Day	Daisuke Chiba	Folium LLC	
9 June 2024	Insomnia	Mariyasu	—N/a	
22 November 2024	Teenage Blue	伊勢田 世山	A-1 Pictures	
27 November 2024	lazy cat	Off Script, Resh	—N/a	
24 December 2024	Sayonara End Roll	Mariyasu	—N/a	
23 May 2025	feel like	—N/a	—N/a	
11 July 2025	Ghost Avenue (ゴーストアベニュ)	Mariyasu	—N/a	
1 Nov 2025	Iolite (アイオライト)	Havtza	—N/a	
28 Nov 2025	Underdog	Off Script	—N/a	
24 Apr 2026	Wind's Anthem	Kukka	—N/a	With suis from Yorushika
26 June 2026	Abyss in the world	Ten to Ten	—N/a	

== Awards and nominations ==
Year	Award ceremony	Category	Work(s)/nominee(s)	Result	Ref.
2020	Space Shower Music Awards	Best Animation Video	"We're Still Underground"	Won	
2020	Crunchyroll Anime Awards	Best Opening Sequence	"Kaikai Kitan" (from anime Jujutsu Kaisen Season 1)	Nominated	
2021	MTV Europe Music Awards	Best Japanese Act	Eve	Nominated	
