= Smile (Eve album) =

- Regular edition

Studio album by Eve
- Released: February 12, 2020
- Recorded: MSR Studio; Aobadai Studio Inc.
- Length: 42:48
- Language: Japanese
- Label: Toy's Factory
- Producer: Eve

Eve chronology
Otogi (2019)	Smile (2020)	Kaikai Kitan/Ao no Waltz (2020)

Singles from Smile
- 1. "Yamiyo" Released: June 29, 2019; 2. "Raison d’être" Released: October 11, 2019; 3. "Hakugin" Released: December 19, 2019

Smile is the fifth studio album by Japanese singer-songwriter Eve. It was released on February 12, 2020, by Toy's Factory. The album consists of thirteen tracks and was supported by three singles: "Yamiyo", "Raison d’être" and "Hakugin". The album also has a limited edition with the same title.

== Background and release ==
This was Eve's first release since his last album titled Otogi a year earlier. The album teaser video was released on YouTube on February 9, 2020. The singer released the song "Kokoro Yohou" digitally as a pre-release on January 31, 2020.

The album was released on February 23, 2020, in several online music stores. The limited version comes in a special box with a DVD containing four music videos, a booklet, a collection of single jackets and a Zingai card. In addition, the possibility of pre-booking tickets for the "Eve LIVE Smile" presentation was included.

== Promotion ==
Eve planned to promote the album during his "Eve LIVE Smile" presentation, but it was postponed and cancelled due to the COVID-19 pandemic. Also, although the schedule was not officially announced, Eve said there was a plan to tour nationally from the summer through the autumn of 2020.

== Track listing ==
Smile – Regular edition
No.	Title	Lyrics	Arrangement	Length
1.	"Doublet"	Eve; Numa	Numa	1:14
2.	"Leo"	Eve	Numa	4:07
3.	"Raison d’être" (レーゾンデートル)	Eve	Numa	3:42
4.	"Kara no Kioku" (虚の記憶)	Eve	Numa	3:49
5.	"Inochi no Tabekata" (いのちの食べ方)	Eve	Numa	3:44
6.	"Yamiyo" (闇夜 lit. Dark Night)	Eve	Numa	3:50
7.	"Asa Ga Furu" (朝が降る)	Eve	Numa	4:04
8.	"Kokoro Yohou" (心予報)	Eve	Taku Inoue; Numa	3:20
9.	"Hakugin" (白銀)	Eve	Numa	4:05
10.	"Baumkuchen End" (バウムクーヘンエンド)	Eve	Numa	3:29
11.	"Mellow"	Eve	Numa	4:46
12.	"Ognanje"	Eve; Numa	Numa	0:45
13.	"Uron na Shokutaku" (胡乱な食卓)	Eve	Eve; Numa	1:58
Total length:				42:58

DVD – Limited edition
No.	Title	Directed by	Length
1.	"Yamiyo" (Music video)	Mah; Waboku
2.	"Baumkuchen End" (Music video)	Waboku
3.	"Raison d’être" (Music video)	Ryu Nakayama
4.	"Kokoro Yohou" (Music video)	Nobutaka Yoda (10GAUGE)

== Charts ==
Chart (2020)	Position
Japanese Albums (Oricon)	2
Japan Hot 100 (Billboard)	3

== Sales ==
Region	Certification	Certified units/sales
Japan	—	32,086
