= Josee, the Tiger and the Fish (2020 film) =

2020 Japanese anime film

- Theatrical release poster

Japanese name
- Kanji: ジョゼと虎と魚たち
Transcriptions
- Revised Hepburn: Joze to Tora to Sakanatachi
- Directed by: Kotaro Tamura
- Screenplay by: Sayaka Kuwamura
- Based on: Josee, the Tiger and the Fish by Seiko Tanabe
- Produced by: Shuuzou Kasahara; Koichiro Mukai; Mari Suzuki
- Starring: Taishi Nakagawa; Kaya Kiyohara
- Cinematography: Tsuyoshi Kanbayashi
- Edited by: Kumiko Sakamoto
- Music by: Evan Call
- Production company: Bones
- Distributed by: Shochiku Animation; Kadokawa Animation
- Release dates: October 30, 2020 (Busan); December 25, 2020 (Japan)
- Running time: 98 minutes
- Country: Japan
- Language: Japanese

Josee, the Tiger and the Fish (Japanese: ジョゼと虎と魚たち, Hepburn: Joze to Tora to Sakanatachi) is a 2020 Japanese animated romance film directed by Kotaro Tamura, written by Sayaka Kuwamura, and based on Seiko Tanabe's short story of the same name. The characters were designed by Nao Emoto (who also created a tie-in manga), animation character designs by Haruko Iizuka (who also served as chief supervising animator), and animation production by Bones. The film follows the lives of a university student and a paraplegic woman.

It opened in 9th place at the Japanese box office in its initial week of release and received highly positive reviews from critics.

== Plot ==
Tsuneo Suzukawa, a university student and part time store employee in Osaka, rescues the disabled Josee, when she accidentally pushes her wheelchair down a steep road. Tsuneo is invited in by Josee's grandmother, Chizu, spending the night at the house and becoming Josee's caretaker. At first, Josee acts selfishly, but eventually their relationship grows. Tsuneo and Josee spend time at the beach together. Later, Josee is hired at the library by one of her friends, Kana Kishimoto. Tsuneo receives the scholarship and an offer to study in Mexico, but does not tell Josee about the future.

After Chizu dies of a heart attack, Josee holds out alone, but is informed by two men that she will leave the house for a few months. One of the co-workers, Mai Ninomiya, tells Josee to "redeem herself and set Tsuneo free". Josee becomes an office worker, instead of being an artist. After having an argument at the beach, Josee gets her wheelchair stuck in the road. Tsuneo gets hit by a car, suffers a bone fracture on his right leg, and stays at the hospital for two months. When the professor informs Tsuneo that another student will replace him for school and travel, he gives up his dream and leaves Josee some time alone. However, Mai visits Josee, and tells her that she deserves Tsuneo more because she knows him better, in an attempt to convince Josee to help Tsuneo.

As Tsuneo goes through rehabilitation, Josee resumes her role as an artist. One of Tsuneo's friends, Hayato Matsūra, escorts him from the hospital to the library, where Josee reads a story to the children: a book she has drawn called "The Mermaid and the Radiant Wings", an allegory for their relationship. Tsuneo, becoming impressed with the story, is encouraged into physical therapy, working relentlessly and walking again. He asks her to be there before being discharged, but she tells him that she will be happy for him. The discharged Tsuneo leaves the hospital and returns to the empty house, only to find Josee gone.

While his friends search for Josee around the city, Tsuneo sees and follows the wheelchair tracks in the snow from the zoo (where Josee sees the tiger). When a careless stranger knocks the wheelchair into a snowy road, Josee finds herself tumbling but Tsuneo saves her once again, the same way they first met. Holding each other, they confess their feelings and share the future: Josee tells Tsuneo that she wants to be a storybook illustrator, and he tells her that he is staying with her. Josee asks about Mexico, and Tsuneo tells her that he will return home, because he loves her. She tells him the same and they embrace. Tsuneo travels to Mexico and Josee abandons the house for demolition. The next year, Tsuneo returns to Japan and continues spending time with Josee.

== Voice cast ==
Character
Character	Japanese	English
Tsuneo Suzukawa (鈴川恒夫, Suzukawa Tsuneo)	Taishi Nakagawa	Howard Wang
A university student, studying marine biology and working part-time at a diving shop.
Kumiko Yamamura (山村クミ子, Yamamura Kumiko)	Kaya Kiyohara	Suzie Yeung
A wheelchair user who cannot move her legs. Her nickname is "Josee", inspired from the French author Françoise Sagan
Mai Ninomiya (二ノ宮舞, Ninomiya Mai)	Yume Miyamoto	Dani Chambers
One of Tsuneo's friends.
Hayato Matsuura (松浦隼人, Matsuura Hayato)	Kazuyuki Okitsu	Zeno Robinson
One of Tsuneo's friends.
Kana Kishimoto (岸本花菜, Kishimoto Kana)	Lynn	Megan Shipman
Josee's supervising librarian.
Chizu Yamamura (山村チヅ, Yamamura Chizu)	Chiemi Matsutera	Casey Casper
Josee's retired grandmother.

== Production ==
The film was announced on December 3, 2019. Tamura worked at Kadokawa Corporation and laid out a set of books to choose from. They wanted to adapt a piece of classic Japanese literature. Josee was chosen in the meeting and the film entered production. Tamura planned to make the film with a happy ending, in contrast to other darker films about disability. He said: "We wanted to have a very uplifting and positive message." Tamura noted that Josee's condition was inherited from birth, and that she did not get it during her life. Rather than having the character develop from outside sources, they would instead have her change internally, like a normal one.

Production of the anime film began on December 3, 2019, and the promotion of the film was released. On January 3, 2020, they announced that the film would be shown in the summer of that year. On March 3, 2020, the film scenes and illustrations were released. The film's release date was delayed, due to the COVID-19 pandemic. On August 13, 2020, it was officially announced that the film will be released on December 25.

== Music ==
Evan Call composed the film's music. He also worked on the opening theme Take Me Far Away, a song performed by Ai Ichikawa. Eve performed the film's insert song Shinkai (心海) and ending theme Ao no Waltz (蒼のワルツ, Ao no Warutsu).

== Release ==
The film premiered at the 25th Busan International Film Festival on October 30, 2020, as the festival's closing film. It later premiered in Japan on December 25, 2020, after being delayed for six months due to the COVID-19 pandemic.

Funimation acquired the film in North America in July 2021. It premiered at the 2021 Toronto International Film Festival. Anime Limited has acquired the film for release in the British Isles (the United Kingdom and Ireland), while Madman Entertainment acquired the film for Oceania, and screened it in Australia and New Zealand on May 13, and June 10, 2021. The film premiered at the Annecy International Animation Film Festival from June 14 to 19, 2021.

== Reception ==
On the review aggregator website Rotten Tomatoes, 100% of 15 critics' reviews are positive, with an average rating of 7.9/10.

== Awards ==
Year	Award	Category	Recipient	Result	Ref.
2021	75th Mainichi Film Awards	Best Animation Film	Josee, the Tiger and the Fish	Nominated	
2021	44th Japan Academy Film Prize	Animation of the Year	Josee, the Tiger and the Fish	Nominated	
2021	Annecy International Animation Film Festival	Feature Film	Josee, the Tiger and the Fish	Nominated	
2021	Kotatsu Japanese Animation Festival 2021	Audience Award Winner	Josee, the Tiger and the Fish	Won	
2021	Hochi Film Awards	Best Animated Picture	Josee, the Tiger and the Fish	Nominated	
2022	6th Crunchyroll Anime Awards	Best Film	Josee, the Tiger and the Fish	Nominated	
