= Jujutsu Kaisen (TV series) =

Japanese anime television series

- 呪術廻戦
- Genre: Adventure; Dark fantasy; Supernatural
- Based on: Jujutsu Kaisen by Gege Akutami
- Screenplay by: Hiroshi Seko
- Directed by: Sunghoo Park (S1); Shōta Goshozono (S2–3, chief S4); Takeru Satō (S4)
- Voices of: Junya Enoki; Yuma Uchida; Asami Seto; Yuichi Nakamura; Mikako Komatsu; Junichi Suwabe
- Music by: Yoshimasa Terui; Hiroaki Tsutsumi (S1); Arisa Okehazama (S1)
- No. of seasons: 3
- No. of episodes: 59 (list of episodes)

Production
- Producers: Hiroaki Matsutani; Yuuriha Murai (S1–2); Makoto Kimura (S1–2); Hiroaki Yamazaki (S2–3); Tatsuya Oomori (S2–3); Toshihiro Maeda (S1); Yoshiaki Takagaki (S1); Takamitsu Sueyoshi (S3); Takumi Tamura (S3)
- Cinematography: Teppei Itō
- Animator: MAPPA
- Editor: Keisuke Yanagi
- Running time: 23 minutes; 28 minutes (#51, 59)
- Production company: Jujutsu Kaisen Project (Note: A production committee label consisting of various companies)

Original release
- Network: MBS, TBS
- Release: October 3, 2020 – present

Related
- Jujutsu Kaisen 0

Jujutsu Kaisen (呪術廻戦; rgh. 'Sorcery Battle' (Note: Jujutsu (呪術) translates as 'sorcery', while Kaisen is a coined word by the author, combining two kanji; kai (廻; 'to rotate') and sen (戦; 'battle').)) is a Japanese anime television series produced by MAPPA, based on the manga series Jujutsu Kaisen by Gege Akutami. The story focuses on high school student Yuji Itadori as he joins a secret organization of Jujutsu Sorcerers to eliminate a powerful Sorcerer named Ryomen Sukuna, of whom Yuji becomes the host. The series broadcasts on MBS, TBS and their JNN affiliates in Japan. Crunchyroll licensed the series for worldwide streaming outside of Asia and launched an English dub in November 2020. The anime's original soundtrack was released in April 2021.

A film set before the events of the main series, Jujutsu Kaisen 0, was released in Japan by Toho in December 2021. It adapts the prequel manga series Jujutsu Kaisen 0, also by Gege Akutami.

== Synopsis ==
Yuji Itadori is a teenage boy who becomes the vessel for Ryomen Sukuna, a legendary and immensely powerful ancient sorcerer, after consuming one of his preserved fingers. To prevent Sukuna's full resurrection and protect humanity, Itadori allies with an organization of Jujutsu Sorcerers. These sorcerers combat monstrous manifestations of negative human emotions, known as Curses, using a supernatural energy source called Cursed Energy. Itadori's mission is to locate and consume Sukuna's remaining fingers so that he can ultimately be executed along with Sukuna, thereby preventing a catastrophic threat to the world.

== Series overview ==
Season	Episodes		Originally released	
Season	Episodes		First released	Last released
1	24		October 3, 2020	March 27, 2021
2	23	5	July 6, 2023	August 3, 2023
2	23	18	August 31, 2023	December 28, 2023
3	12		January 9, 2026	March 27, 2026

== Cast and characters ==
Character	Japanese	English
Yuji Itadori (虎杖 悠仁, Itadori Yūji)	Junya Enoki	Adam McArthur
Megumi Fushiguro (伏黒 恵, Fushiguro Megumi)	Yuma Uchida	Robbie Daymond
Nobara Kugisaki (釘崎 野薔薇, Kugisaki Nobara)	Asami Seto	Anne Yatco
Satoru Gojo (五条 悟, Gojō Satoru)	Yuichi Nakamura; Mariya Ise (child)	Kaiji Tang; Cristina Vee (child)
Yuta Okkotsu (乙骨 憂太, Okkotsu Yūta)	Megumi Ogata	Kayleigh McKee
Maki Zen'in (禪院 真希, Zen'in Maki)	Mikako Komatsu	Allegra Clark
Panda (パンダ)	Tomokazu Seki	Matthew David Rudd
Ryomen Sukuna (両面宿儺, Ryōmen Sukuna)	Junichi Suwabe	Ray Chase
Choso (脹相, Chōsō)	Daisuke Namikawa	Ray Chase
Aoi Todo (東堂 葵, Tōdō Aoi)	Subaru Kimura	Xander Mobus
Kinji Hakari (秤 金次, Hakari Kinji)	Kazuya Nakai	Yuri Lowenthal
Hiromi Higuruma (日車 寛見, Higuruma Hiromi)	Tomokazu Sugita	Ben Balmaceda
Kento Nanami (七海 建人, Nanami Kento)	Kenjiro Tsuda	David Vincent
Mahito (真人)	Nobunaga Shimazaki	Lucien Dodge
Fumihiko Takaba (髙羽 史彦, Takaba Fumihiko)	Satoshi Tsuruoka	Scott Whyte
Toge Inumaki (狗巻 棘, Inumaki Toge)	Koki Uchiyama	Xander Mobus
Rika Orimoto (折本 里香, Orimoto Rika)	Kana Hanazawa	Anairis Quiñones
Suguru Geto (夏油 傑, Getō Suguru) / Kenjaku (羂索)	Takahiro Sakurai	Lex Lang
Jogo (漏瑚, Jōgo)	Shigeru Chiba	Michael Sorich
Uraume (裏梅)	Mitsuki Saiga	Erica Mendez
Yuki Tsukumo (九十九 由基, Tsukumo Yuki)	Noriko Hidaka	Anjali Kunapaneni
Ryu Ishigori (石流 龍, Ishigōri Ryū)	Hiroki Tōchi	Aleks Le
Takako Uro (鳥鷺 亨子, Uro Takako)	Nana Mizuki	Erica Lindbeck
Kiyotaka Ijichi (伊地知 潔高, Ijichi Kiyotaka)	Mitsuo Iwata	Chris Tergliafera
Naoya Zen'in (禪院 直哉, Zen'in Naoya)	Kōji Yusa	Alan Lee
Haruta Shigemo (重面 春太, Shigemo Haruta)	Wataru Hatano	Chris Hackney
Juzo Kamiya (組屋 鞣造, Kamiya Juzo)	Tetsu Inada	Xander Mobus
Hanami (花御)	Atsuko Tanaka	Marie Westbrook
Dagon (陀艮)	Kenta Miyake; Aya Endō (Cursed Womb)	Jamieson Price
Kasumi Miwa (三輪 霞, Miwa Kasumi)	Chinatsu Akasaki	Allegra Clark
Reggie Star (レジィ・スター, Rejii Sutā)	Yutaka Aoyama	Alejandro Saab
Toji Fushiguro (伏黒甚爾, Fushiguro Tōji)	Takehito Koyasu	Nicolas Roye
Shoko Ieiri (家入 硝子, Ieiri Shoko)	Aya Endō	Ryan Bartley
Eso (壊相, Esō)	Nobuyuki Hiyama	Landon McDonald
Mai Zen'in (禪院 真依, Zen'in Mai)	Marina Inoue	Laura Post
Kokichi Muta (与 幸吉, Muta Kōkichi) / Mechamaru (メカ丸, Mekamaru)	Yoshitsugu Matsuoka	Keith Silverstein
Iori Hazenoki (黄櫨 折, Hazenoki Iori)	Ryōta Ōsaka	Elijah Ungvary
Momo Nishimiya (西宮 桃, Nishimiya Momo)	Rie Kugimiya	Tara Sands
Noritoshi Kamo (加茂 憲紀, Noritoshi Kamo)	Satoshi Hino	Landon McDonald
Mei Mei (冥冥)	Kotono Mitsuishi	Amber Lee Connors
Yoshinobu Gakuganji (楽巌寺 嘉伸, Gakuganji Yoshinobu)	Mugihito	Kyle Hebert
Utahime Iori (庵 歌姫, Iori Utahime)	Yoko Hikasa	Tara Sands
Takuma Ino (猪野 琢真, Ino Takuma)	Yū Hayashi	Lucien Dodge
Ui Ui (憂憂)	Yūko Sanpei	Sarah Anne Williams
Junpei Yoshino (吉野 順平, Yoshino Junpei)	Yoshitaka Yamaya	Nicolas Roye
Nagi Yoshino (吉野 凪, Yoshino Nagi)	Junko Noda	Amber Lee Connors
Riko Omanai (天内理子, Amanai Riko)	Anna Nagase	Reba Buhr
Misato Kuroi (黒井美里, Kuroi Misato)	Risa Shimizu	Jeannie Tirado
Shiu Kong (孔時雨, Kon Shiu)	Hiroki Yasumoto	Mick Lauer
Yuko Ozawa (小沢優子, Ozawa Yūko)	Aimi	Kayli Mills
Naobito Zen'in (禪院 直毘人, Zen'in Naobito)	Jouji Nakata	Kyle Hebert
Saori (沙織)	Rie Suegara	Cristina Vee
Fumi (ふみ)	Azusa Aoi	Emi Lo
Wasuke Itadori (虎杖 倭助, Itadori Wasuke)	Shigeru Chiba	Kyle Hebert
Setsuko Sasaki (佐々木 節子, Sasaki Setsuko)	Mariya Ise	Xanthe Huynh
Takeshi Iguchi (井口 たけし, Iguchi Takeshi)	Takahiro Sumi	Kyle Hebert
Tsumiki Fushiguro (伏黒 津美紀, Fushiguro Tsumiki)	Saori Hayami	Suzie Yeung
Nobuko Takada (高田 延子, Takada Nobuko)	Tomoyo Kurosawa	Laura Post

== Production ==
Jujutsu Kaisen director Sunghoo Park had meetings with Shueisha and the Jujutsu Kaisen manga author Gege Akutami to discuss the details about adapting the long-form narrative into a seasonal anime structure. Park also felt the challenges from the MAPPA's staff in adapting the series' designs, build the characters, and create the "Domain Expansion" scenes during their production which he stated that it required a lots of detailed discussion with Akutami and Shueisha to enhance their works. Compared to his previous work The God of High School, Park acknowledges in working with different teams through the use of their technique and creativity to make their action scenes possible.

Scriptwriter Hiroshi Seko discussed about the handling of the drama but also the comedic banter between the teenagers, adults, and the cursed spirits in the series which is mostly based on the original materials. Toho producer Hiroaki Matsutani also revealed the addition of the post-credits shorts "Juju Sanpo", in which an idea from Akutami came up with the draft and later submitting it to the staff. When discussing about the sound and music, Matsutani originally stated that they assigned Yoshiki Kobayashi as the composer, before its role was eventually given to both Hiroaki Tsutsumi and Yoshimasa Terui.

== Release ==
=== Season 1 ===
The series was announced by Weekly Shōnen Jump in November 2019. The manga author, Gege Akutami, and the main cast members appeared at Jump Festa '20 on December 22, 2019. The series was produced by MAPPA and directed by Sunghoo Park. Hiroshi Seko was in charge of the scripts, Tadashi Hiramatsu designed the characters. While the anime had an advanced streaming debut on YouTube and Twitter on September 19, 2020, it aired for 24 episodes on MBS and TBS's Super Animeism block from October 3, 2020, to March 27, 2021. (Note: MBS listed the air dates for the season as Fridays at 25:25, which is effectively Saturdays at 1:25 a.m. JST.) From episode 3 onwards, the series includes post-credits anime shorts titled "Juju Sanpo" (呪術さんぽ; lit. 'Jujutsu Stroll'), which focus on the daily lives of the characters.

The first season was rebroadcast in the Nichigo time slot on all JNN stations in Japan, including MBS and TBS, from April 3 to September 11, 2022.

=== Season 2 ===
On February 12, 2022, a second season was announced. Shōta Goshozono replaced Sunghoo Park as series director, with Sayaka Koiso and Hiramatsu designing the characters. The season aired for 23 episodes from July 6 to December 28, 2023. It ran for two continuous cours and respectively adapted the manga's Hidden Inventory / Premature Death (懐玉・玉折, Kaigyoku / Gyokusetsu) and Shibuya Incident (渋谷事変編, Shibuya Jihen) story arcs in 5 and 18 episodes.

=== Season 3 ===
Immediately following the second season's finale, an anime sequel covering the Culling Game story arc was announced. In August 2025, it was revealed that the sequel would be a third season, titled The Culling Game: Part 1 (死滅回游 前編, Shimetsu Kaiyū: Zenpen), which premiered with a one-hour special featuring the first two episodes on January 9, 2026. (Note: MBS listed the air dates for the season as Thursdays at 24:26, which is effectively Fridays at 12:26 a.m. JST.) The season aired for 12 episodes, concluding with an extended 27-minute episode on March 27, 2026. (Note: It aired on March 26 at 24:26, which is effectively March 27 at 12:26 a.m. JST.)

=== Season 4 ===
Immediately following the third season's finale, a fourth season, titled The Culling Game: Part 2 (死滅回游 後編, Shimetsu Kaiyū: Kōhen), was announced. Takeru Satō, the third season's assistant director, will replace Goshozono as director for the fourth season, while Goshozono will instead act as chief director.

=== International release ===
Crunchyroll licensed the series for worldwide streaming outside of Asia. Crunchyroll has released streaming dubs for the series in English, Spanish, Portuguese, French and German that premiered on November 20, 2020, with the English dub also premiering on HBO Max on December 4, 2020. Crunchyroll is also streaming the second season. Viz Media released the first part of the first season on home video on February 28, 2023. In Asia-Pacific, Medialink licensed the series and streamed it on iQIYI and Ani-One Asia's YouTube channel; Ani-One Asia later streamed the series for their Ultra subscribers. The company also released the series on Netflix in Southeast Asia, India, Hong Kong, and Taiwan on June 3, 2021.

=== Feature-length compilations ===
A compilation feature version of Hidden Inventory / Premature Death, distributed by Toho Next, premiered in Japanese theaters on May 30, 2025, with screenings in MX4D and 4DX starting on June 21 of that same year.

A compilation film of the Shibuya Incident along the first two episodes of season 4 (The Culling Game: Part 1), distributed by Toho, premiered in Japanese theaters on November 7, 2025, with screenings in IMAX that same day, followed by screenings in MX4D and 4DX on November 22.

== Music ==
The original soundtrack for the first season of the series is composed by Yoshimasa Terui, Hiroaki Tsutsumi and Arisa Okehazama. The series' first opening theme is "Kaikai Kitan" (廻廻奇譚; lit. 'Round Round Mysterious Story'), performed by Eve, while the first ending theme is "Lost in Paradise" performed by ALI featuring Aklo. The second opening theme is "Vivid Vice", performed by Who-ya Extended, while the second ending theme is "Give It Back", performed by Cö Shu Nie. The original soundtrack was released on a 2-CD set on April 21, 2021. Anime Limited released the soundtrack digitally in North America, Europe and Oceania on April 21, 2021, and was released on CD and vinyl on January 31, 2022.

Terui returned as the sole composer of the second season. For the second season's first five episodes (covering the "Hidden Inventory / Premature Death" arc), Tatsuya Kitani performed the opening theme "Where Our Blue Is" (青のすみか, Ao no Sumika; lit. 'House of Blue'), while Soushi Sakiyama performed the ending theme "Akari" (燈; lit. 'Light'). For the sixth episode onwards (covering the "Shibuya Incident" arc), King Gnu performed the opening theme "Specialz", while Hitsujibungaku performed the ending theme "More Than Words". For the first part of the third season's "Culling Game" arc, King Gnu performed the opening theme "Aizo", while Jo0ji performed the ending theme "Yoake no Uta" (よあけのうた; lit. 'Song of Dawn').

For the Hidden Inventory / Premature Death compilation film, Kitani performed an acoustic version of "Where Our Blue Is".

== Reception ==
=== Popularity ===
In January 2021, it was revealed that Jujutsu Kaisen was the second most-watched anime series on Crunchyroll in 2020, only second to Black Clover, being watched in 71 countries and territories, including North America, South and Central America, Europe, Middle East and North Africa, Africa, Asia and Oceania. The official music video of the series' first opening theme song, "Kaikai Kitan" by Eve, reached 100 million views on YouTube in April 2021, being one of the fastest anime openings to hit such number of views.

On Tumblr's 2021 Year in Review, which highlights the largest communities, fandoms, and trends on the platform throughout the year, Jujutsu Kaisen ranked second behind My Hero Academia on the Top Anime & Manga Shows while Satoru Gojo was fifth on the Top Anime & Manga Characters category. During the same year, the series became the second most discussed TV show worldwide on Twitter, surpassing Squid Game. It placed nineteenth on the annual Twitter Japan's Trend Awards in 2021, based on the social network's top trending topics of the year.

In 2024, Jujutsu Kaisen was named by the Guinness World Records and data-science firm Parrot Analytics as the "Most in-demand animated TV show", with a global demand rating 71.2 times than that of the average TV show, previously held by Attack on Titan. The demand of the series peaked on December 29 at 128 times the demand of the average show. It also had a higher percentage of Gen Z (ages 13–22) viewers with 71.3%, compared to 56.7% from One Piece and 64.4% from Attack on Titan.

In April 2024, where according to the data compiled by the analyst Miles Atherton, Jujutsu Kaisen had the most social media engagement for the last 30 days in the top anime and network dramas in United States with 11.2 million, ahead of the other top shows including One Piece, Young Sheldon, and Grey's Anatomy.

=== Critical reception ===
Micah Peters of The Ringer stated that while the series' focused execution of shōnen tropes rendered it infinitely watchable, its specificity, personality, and ultra-slick stylishness were what made it exceptional. He noted that, similar to director Sunghoo Park's previous work on The God of High School, the anime featured a sumptuous amount of splashy, expensive animation enabled by motion capture, which delivered on the action promised by the source material. Paul Thomas Chapman of Otaku USA described the series as a prime example of average material elevated by excellent execution, drawing comparisons to Bleach and YuYu Hakusho. Chapman praised director Park's ability to seamlessly segue from goofy comedy to chilling horror and noted that the crew at MAPPA made this narrative mutability seem effortless. Ana Diaz of Polygon highlighted the seventeenth episode, praising the series' treatment of its female characters as a departure from other shōnen series. Diaz wrote that the show presented a variety of female perspectives, allowing its young women to disagree and fight for their viewpoints. She concluded that its widespread success signaled that audiences were actively craving such change, giving other creators a green light to write diverse women into their shows.

Reviewing the second season's Shibuya Incident Arc, Rafael Motamayor of IGN praised its animation but criticized its narrative as meandering. He described the relentless fight sequences as a slog, characterizing the arc as a series of nonsensical battles lacking emotional depth in the storytelling. In a separate review, Beckett criticized the series for its handling of Nobara Kugisaki's apparent death, noting that the lack of known details about her character made the accompanying flashback ineffective. This was contrasted with the better-executed death of Kento Nanami. Beckett compared Nobara's fate to the "women in refrigerators" trope, arguing it served primarily to shock protagonist Yuji Itadori. The shock surrounding Nobara's fate was echoed by The Television, which highlighted the dissonance created by her continued appearance in the ending sequence alongside the surviving characters. In a general assessment of the season, Bolts of Anime News Network praised the backstory of Satoru Gojo and Suguru Geto but found the Shibuya arc mishandled its protagonist, Yuji Itadori, by portraying him more as a victim than an active participant.

=== Accolades ===
The Jujutsu Kaisen anime was awarded "Anime of the Year" at the 5th Crunchyroll Anime Awards, while Ryomen Sukuna won the "Best Antagonist" category and "Lost in Paradise feat. Aklo" by ALI won the "Best Ending Sequence" category. In 2021, the series won the Character License Award at the Japan Character Awards by Japan's Character Brand Licensing Association (CBLA). It also won the Best TV Anime award at the 2021 Newtype Anime Awards, while Hiroshi Seko won Best Screenplay for his work on the series. The series ranked second in the anime category of the Yahoo! Japan Search Awards, based on the number of searches for a particular term compared to the year before. In 2022, the series won the Tokyo Anime Award for Animation of the Year in the television category.

In 2023, Jujutsu Kaisen became one of three recipients of the Special Achievement Award at the 65th Japan Record Awards. In 2024, it won the "Most In-Demand TV Series in the World 2023" and "Most In-Demand Anime Series of 2023" at the sixth Global Demand Awards. At the 8th Crunchyroll Anime Awards, the second season of the anime won eleven out of seventeen nominations including "Anime of the Year", which became the first to win multiple top prizes. The season also surpassed the second season of My Hero Academia (eight from the second edition in 2018) as the most awarded anime in awards history.

=== Awards and nominations ===
Year	Award	Category	Recipient	Result	Ref.
2021	D-Anime Store Awards	Recommended Anime	Jujutsu Kaisen	Won	
2021	D-Anime Store Awards	Most Interesting Plot Developments	Jujutsu Kaisen	Won	
2021	5th Crunchyroll Anime Awards	Anime of the Year	Jujutsu Kaisen	Won	
2021	5th Crunchyroll Anime Awards	Best Protagonist	Yuji Itadori	Nominated	
2021	5th Crunchyroll Anime Awards	Best Antagonist	Ryomen Sukuna	Won	
2021	5th Crunchyroll Anime Awards	Best Boy	Satoru Gojo	Nominated	
2021	5th Crunchyroll Anime Awards	Best Animation	Jujutsu Kaisen	Nominated	
2021	5th Crunchyroll Anime Awards	Best Director	Sunghoo Park	Nominated	
2021	5th Crunchyroll Anime Awards	Best Opening Sequence	"Kaikai Kitan" by Eve	Nominated	
2021	5th Crunchyroll Anime Awards	Best Ending Sequence	"Lost in Paradise" by ALI feat. Aklo	Won	
2021	5th Crunchyroll Anime Awards	Best Fight Scene	Satoru Gojo vs. Ryomen Sukuna	Nominated	
2021	5th Crunchyroll Anime Awards	Best VA Performance (Japanese)	Yuichi Nakamura as Satoru Gojo	Nominated	
2021	Japan Character Awards	Character License Award	Jujutsu Kaisen	Won	
2021	16th AnimaniA Awards	Best Online Series	Jujutsu Kaisen	Won	
2021	43rd Anime Grand Prix	Grand Prix	Jujutsu Kaisen	3rd place	
2021	43rd Anime Grand Prix	Best Character (Male)	Satoru Gojo	2nd place	
2021	43rd Anime Grand Prix	Best Character (Female)	Nobara Kugisaki	5th place	
2021	43rd Anime Grand Prix	Best Theme Song	"Kaikai Kitan" by Eve	2nd place	
2021	43rd Anime Grand Prix	Best Voice Actor	Yuichi Nakamura	8th place	
2021	11th Newtype Anime Awards	Best TV Anime	Jujutsu Kaisen	Won	
2021	11th Newtype Anime Awards	Screenplay Award	Hiroshi Seko	Won	
2021	Yahoo! Japan Search Awards	Anime Category	Jujutsu Kaisen	2nd place	
2021	IGN Awards	Best Anime Series	Jujutsu Kaisen	Nominated	
2022	4th Global TV Demand Awards	Most In-Demand Anime Series of 2021	Jujutsu Kaisen	Nominated	
2022	Tokyo Anime Award Festival	Animation of the Year (Television)	Jujutsu Kaisen	Won	
2022	6th Crunchyroll Anime Awards	Anime of the Year	Jujutsu Kaisen	Nominated	
2022	6th Crunchyroll Anime Awards	Best Protagonist	Yuji Itadori	Nominated	
2022	6th Crunchyroll Anime Awards	Best Girl	Nobara Kugisaki	Won	
2022	6th Crunchyroll Anime Awards	Best Animation	Jujutsu Kaisen	Nominated	
2022	6th Crunchyroll Anime Awards	Best Director	Sunghoo Park	Nominated	
2022	6th Crunchyroll Anime Awards	Best Action	Jujutsu Kaisen	Won	
2022	6th Crunchyroll Anime Awards	Best Character Design	Tadashi Hiramatsu	Won	
2022	6th Crunchyroll Anime Awards	Best Opening Sequence	"Vivid Vice" by Who-ya Extended	Nominated	
2022	6th Crunchyroll Anime Awards	Best Fight Scene	Yuji Itadori & Aoi Todo vs. Hanami	Won	
2022	6th Crunchyroll Anime Awards	Best Fight Scene	Yuji Itadori & Nobara Kugisaki vs. Eso & Kechizu	Nominated	
2022	6th Crunchyroll Anime Awards	Best VA Performance (English)	Adam McArthur as Yuji Itadori	Nominated	
2022	6th Crunchyroll Anime Awards	Best VA Performance (French)	Mark Lesser as Satoru Gojo	Nominated	
2022	6th Crunchyroll Anime Awards	Best VA Performance (German)	René Dawn-Claude as Satoru Gojo	Won	
2022	6th Crunchyroll Anime Awards	Best VA Performance (Portuguese)	Leo Rabelo as Satoru Gojo	Won	
2022	6th Crunchyroll Anime Awards	Best VA Performance (Portuguese)	Amanda Brigido as Nobara Kugisaki	Nominated	
2022	6th Crunchyroll Anime Awards	Best VA Performance (Spanish)	José Gilberto Vilchis as Satoru Gojo	Nominated	
2022	16th Seiyu Awards	Best Actor in Supporting Role	Yuichi Nakamura as Satoru Gojo (Note: Also for World Trigger as Yuichi Jin)	Won	
2022	16th Seiyu Awards	Best Actress in Supporting Role	Mikako Komatsu as Maki Zen'in (Note: Also for Dragon Quest: The Adventure of Dai as Maam)	Won	
2022	Japan Expo Awards	Daruma for Best Opening	"Vivid Vice" by Who-ya Extended	Won	
2023	7th Crunchyroll Anime Awards	Best VA Performance (Italian)	Elisa Giorgio as Maki Zen'in	Won	
2023	17th Seiyu Awards	Synergy Award	Jujutsu Kaisen	Won	
2023	18th AnimaniA Awards	Best TV Series: Disc Release	Jujutsu Kaisen	Won	
2023	18th AnimaniA Awards	Best Director	Sunghoo Park	Won	
2023	18th AnimaniA Awards	Best Character Design	Tadashi Hiramatsu	Won	
2023	18th AnimaniA Awards	Best Anime Song	"Vivid Vice" by Who-ya Extended	Won	
2023	29th Manga Barcelona Awards	Best Anime Series Premiere	Jujutsu Kaisen Season 2	Won	
2023	Abema Anime Trend Awards	Anime Topic Award	Jujutsu Kaisen Season 2	Won	
2023	65th Japan Record Awards	Special Achievement Award	Jujutsu Kaisen	Won	
2024	6th Global Demand Awards	Most In-Demand TV Series in the World	Jujutsu Kaisen	Won	
2024	6th Global Demand Awards	Most In-Demand Anime Series of 2023	Jujutsu Kaisen	Won	
2024	D-Anime Store Awards	Hottest Anime	Jujutsu Kaisen Season 2	Won	
2024	TVer Awards	Special Award	Jujutsu Kaisen Season 2	Won	
2024	8th Crunchyroll Anime Awards	Anime of the Year	Jujutsu Kaisen Season 2	Won	
2024	8th Crunchyroll Anime Awards	Best Supporting Character	Satoru Gojo	Won	
2024	8th Crunchyroll Anime Awards	Best Supporting Character	Suguru Geto	Nominated	
2024	8th Crunchyroll Anime Awards	Best Animation	Jujutsu Kaisen Season 2	Nominated	
2024	8th Crunchyroll Anime Awards	Best Director	Shōta Goshozono	Won	
2024	8th Crunchyroll Anime Awards	Best Action	Jujutsu Kaisen Season 2	Won	
2024	8th Crunchyroll Anime Awards	Best Continuing Series	Jujutsu Kaisen Season 2	Nominated	
2024	8th Crunchyroll Anime Awards	Best Character Design	Sayaka Koiso and Tadashi Hiramatsu	Won	
2024	8th Crunchyroll Anime Awards	Best Cinematography	Teppei Itō	Won	
2024	8th Crunchyroll Anime Awards	Best Art Direction	Junichi Higashi	Nominated	
2024	8th Crunchyroll Anime Awards	Best Anime Song	"Where Our Blue Is" by Tatsuya Kitani	Nominated	
2024	8th Crunchyroll Anime Awards	Best Opening Sequence	"Where Our Blue Is" by Tatsuya Kitani	Won	
2024	8th Crunchyroll Anime Awards	Best Ending Sequence	"Akari" by Soushi Sakiyama	Won	
2024	8th Crunchyroll Anime Awards	Best VA Performance (Japanese)	Yuichi Nakamura as Satoru Gojo	Won	
2024	8th Crunchyroll Anime Awards	Best VA Performance (Spanish)	Jose Gilberto Vilchis as Satoru Gojo	Nominated	
2024	8th Crunchyroll Anime Awards	Best VA Performance (French)	Martial Leminoux as Suguru Geto	Won	
2024	8th Crunchyroll Anime Awards	Best VA Performance (Portuguese)	Leo Rabelo as Satoru Gojo	Won	
2024	46th Anime Grand Prix	Grand Prix	Jujutsu Kaisen Season 2	6th place	
2024	46th Anime Grand Prix	Best Character	Satoru Gojo	10th place	
2024	46th Anime Grand Prix	Best Theme Song	"Where Our Blue Is" by Tatsuya Kitani	3rd place	
2024	Japan Expo Awards	Daruma for Best Action Anime	Jujutsu Kaisen Season 2	Won	
2024	Japan Expo Awards	Daruma for Best Opening	"Where Our Blue Is" by Tatsuya Kitani	Nominated	
2024	Japan Expo Awards	Daruma for Best Ending	"Akari" by Soushi Sakiyama	Nominated	
2024	14th Newtype Anime Awards	Best TV Anime	Jujutsu Kaisen: Hidden Inventory / Premature Death & Shibuya Incident	Won	
2024	14th Newtype Anime Awards	Best Character (Male)	Satoru Gojo	Won	
2024	14th Newtype Anime Awards	Best Director	Shōta Goshozono	Won	
2024	14th Newtype Anime Awards	Best Studio	MAPPA	Won	
2025	Music Awards Japan	Top Japanese Song in Europe	"Specialz" by King Gnu	Nominated	
2025	Music Awards Japan	Top Japanese Song in North America	"Specialz" by King Gnu	Nominated	
2025	Music Awards Japan	Top Japanese Song in Latin America	"Specialz" by King Gnu	Nominated	
2025	Music Awards Japan	Best J-Rock Song	"Specialz" by King Gnu	Won	
2025	Music Awards Japan	Best Japanese Alternative Song	"More Than Words" by Hitsujibungaku	Won	
2025	Music Awards Japan	Special Award: Radio Best Radio-Break Song	"More Than Words" by Hitsujibungaku	Nominated	
2025	Music Awards Japan	Best of Listeners' Choice: Japanese Song	"Specialz" by King Gnu	Nominated	
2025	9th Crunchyroll Anime Awards	Best VA Performance (Hindi)	Lohit Sharma as Satoru Gojo	Won	
2025	TikTok Trend Awards	Grand Prize	Jujutsu Kaisen	Won	
2026	Music Awards Japan	Top Japanese Song in Asia	"Aizo" by King Gnu	Nominated	
2026	Music Awards Japan	Top Japanese Song in Europe	"Aizo" by King Gnu	Nominated	
2026	Music Awards Japan	Top Japanese Song in North America	"Aizo" by King Gnu	Nominated	
2026	48th Anime Grand Prix	Grand Prix	Jujutsu Kaisen The Culling Game: Part 1	Won	
2026	48th Anime Grand Prix	Best Character	Megumi Fushiguro	2nd place	
2026	48th Anime Grand Prix	Best Character	Yuji Itadori	9th place	
2026	48th Anime Grand Prix	Best Theme Song	"Aizo" by King Gnu	Won	
2026	48th Anime Grand Prix	Best Voice Actor	Yuma Uchida	2nd place	
2026	16th Newtype Anime Awards	Best Work (TV/Streaming)	Jujutsu Kaisen The Culling Game: Part 1	9th place	
2026	16th Newtype Anime Awards	Best Character (Male)	Satoru Gojo	Won	
2026	16th Newtype Anime Awards	Best Studio	MAPPA	Won	
2026	32nd Manga Barcelona Awards	Best Anime Series Premiere	Jujutsu Kaisen The Culling Game: Part 1	Pending	
