= TwitCasting =

Japanese livestreaming service

- Company type: Livestreaming
- Available in: Japanese, English
- Country of origin: Japan
- Website: twitcasting.tv
- Registration: Optional

TwitCasting is a livestreaming service operated by Moi Co., Ltd., headquartered in Tokyo, Japan. In early 2013, TwitCasting was developed to integrate users' smartphone livestreams with Twitter. As of July 2021, it had over 33 million registered users. According to analytics from App Ape Lab, TwitCasting recorded the highest number of monthly active users among livestreaming apps in Japan as of March 2020.

== History ==
On February 3, 2010, TwitCasting Live for iPhone was launched and linked with Twitter. On April 6, 2011, TwitCasting Live for Android was launched. In February 2012, after a company split, the operating company was changed from Sidefeed Co., Ltd. to Moi Co., Ltd. In May 2013, Moi Co., Ltd. raised ¥64.8 million from East Ventures and Masao Itō (User Local CEO), and in June 2014, $5 million from Sinar Mas Group and East Ventures. In September 2015, the number of livestreams exceeded 200 million.

On February 18, 2018, "TwitCasting Kiitos", a function that allows listeners to support the planning of live broadcasters, was released, In December 2018, the service had over 20 million registered users. In April 2018, TwitCasting began accepting virtual currency.

In April 2019, a comprehensive license agreement regarding the use of copyrighted works of Nintendo Co., Ltd. was concluded. A gameplay commentary app TwitCasting Games was released on August 8, 2019. A screen sharing function for PC was released in July 2020.

In March 2021, TwitCasting began broadcasting anime with titles from the Show by Rock!! series. According to reports distributed by PR Times, Show by Rock!! Stars!! attracted over 200,000 viewers. In October of the same year, the first movie began broadcasting on the service: Sumikko Gurashi: Tobidasu Ehon to Himitsu no ko.

== Overview ==
Livestreaming on the service is possible from iPhone and Android devices as well as PC. Facebook and Twitter can be used to notify followers about the livestream. The streaming method can be selected from a video livestream and a radio livestream (only audio is distributed but a still image is displayed on the screen). Registration and login are required for streaming and commenting. However, logging in is not required to watch a livestream.

Registration is possible via syncing a Twitter, Facebook, or Instagram account.

== Controversies ==
The company and other livestreaming services have faced criticism following incidents where users livestreamed criminal acts, responding by suspending the accounts involved.

In 2018, the National Police Agency reported that TwitCasting had the fifth highest number of child users who had been crime victims on social network services, after Twitter, Himabu, LINE, and Marin Chat (now ORCA).

== See also ==
- Niconico
- FC2
