= Jujutsu Kaisen season 3 =

Third season of Jujutsu Kaisen

Jujutsu Kaisen
- Season 3
- Digipak cover art for the first home media volume of the season, featuring (from left to right) Yuji Itadori, Yuta Okkotsu and Choso
- No. of episodes: 12

Release
- Original network: MBS, TBS
- Original release: January 9 – March 27, 2026

Season chronology
- ← Previous; Season 2

The third season of the Jujutsu Kaisen anime television series is based on the manga series Jujutsu Kaisen by Gege Akutami. An animated adaptation of the manga was originally announced in the 52nd issue of Weekly Shōnen Jump, which was published in November 2019.

Following the conclusion of the second season, an unspecified anime sequel covering the "Culling Game" story arc from the manga was announced. In August 2025, it was revealed that the sequel would be the series' third season, titled The Culling Game: Part 1 (死滅回游 前編, Shimetsu Kaiyū: Zenpen), which premiered with a one-hour special featuring the first two episodes of the season on January 9, 2026. Shōta Goshozono returned from the previous season to direct, with Hiroshi Seko and Yoshimasa Terui respectively returning as series composition writer and music composer. (Note: MBS listed the third season's episodes as airing on Thursdays at 24:26, which is effectively Fridays at 12:26 a.m. JST.) The fourth and twelfth episodes of the season received an extended length of 27 minutes; the rest of the episodes were 23 minutes in length. The third season concluded with its twelfth episode on March 27, 2026. (Note: It aired on March 26 at 24:26, which is effectively March 27 at 12:26 a.m. JST.) Immediately following its broadcast, a fourth season, titled The Culling Game: Part 2 (死滅回游 後編, Shimetsu Kaiyū: Kōhen), was announced. Takeru Satō, the third season's assistant director, will replace Goshozono as director for the fourth season.

The season adapts the first half of the manga's "Culling Game" story arc. The plot follows the Jujutsu Sorcerers entering the Culling Game with the main objective of fighting off Kenjaku and freeing Satoru Gojo from the Prison Realm. A compilation film of Shibuya Incident, which also featured the first two episodes of The Culling Game: Part 1, premiered in Japanese theaters on November 7, 2025, under the title Jujutsu Kaisen: Execution.

The season is licensed by Crunchyroll for streaming outside of Asia, and began streaming an English dub on January 22, 2026. It became available to stream in Canada and in parts of Europe in Asia on Disney+ with English subs and dubs starting July 10, 2026.

== Episodes ==
No. overall	No. in season	Title	Directed by (Note: Production staff information is taken from the ending credits of each episode.)	Chief animation directed by	Original release date
48	1	"Execution"; Transliteration: "Shikkō" (Japanese: 執行)	Shōta Goshozono	Yosuke Yajima & Hiromi Niwa	January 9, 2026 (Note: Episodes 48 and 49 aired back-to-back as a one-hour special)
Following the events of the Shibuya Incident, (Note: As depicted in the second season's Shibuya Incident arc) Tokyo has become infested with curses; Yuji Itadori and Choso exorcise them, which also serves as further training for the two. Naobito Zen'in succumbs to his wounds, and his will is read out to his brother Ogi (Maki's and Mai's father), his nephew Jinichi, and his narcissistic, misogynistic son Naoya. Naoya is set to be the Zen'in clan's new head, but the will stipulates that due to an arrangement by Toji Fushiguro, if Satoru Gojo is out of commission, Megumi Fushiguro will succeed him instead. Naoya heads to Tokyo to use Yuji to lure Megumi to him, so he can kill them both. Having inherited Naobito's technique, Naoya overwhelms Yuji and Choso with his speed. Yuta Okkotsu then arrives, and the three immediately acknowledge his immense strength. When Naoya offers to let Yuta kill Yuji in exchange for his silence, Yuji flees and Choso battles Naoya. Yuji and Yuta clash, but the latter proves to be too powerful. Just as Yuji manages to break Yuta's katana, he is caught by his shikigami Rika, allowing Yuta to stab him in the heart.
49	2	"One More Time"; Transliteration: "Mōichido" (Japanese: もう一度)	Directed by : Yōsuke Takada; Storyboarded by : Shōta Goshozono	Yosuke Yajima, Hiromi Niwa, Sota Yamazaki & Mitsue Mori	January 9, 2026
Choso struggles against Naoya, but by flooding the underpass they are in with his blood, he emerges victorious. Yuta defeats Choso and heals Naoya in exchange for confirming Yuji's execution. Yuji sees a memory of his grandfather's conversation with his father Jin, being distrustful of his mother Kaori, who bears stitches on her forehead. Yuta reveals he faked Yuji's death after being tasked by Gojo with protecting him, being sympathetic to Yuji after his own experiences. Megumi appears to ask for his help, but Yuji refuses out of fear of Sukuna's continual threat. Megumi reveals his stepsister Tsumiki will be forced to participate in Pseudo-Geto's Culling Game, a battle royale of jujutsu sorcerers awakened after the Shibuya Incident. Yuji agrees to help, but tells Yuta to kill him if Sukuna emerges again. Knowing they must free Gojo, they head to Jujutsu High and meet up with Yuki Tsukumo and Maki, who survived Jogo's attack. Using Choso's connection to the Death Paintings as a guide, they enter the school's specialized underground chamber to consult immortal jujutsu sorcerer Master Tengen.
50	3	"About the Culling Game"; Transliteration: "Shimetsu Kaiyū ni Tsuite" (Japanese: 死滅回遊について)	Directed by : Takumi Ichikawa; Storyboarded by : Shōta Goshozono	Mitsue Mori	January 16, 2026
Tengen explains that the host in Suguru Geto's body is Kenjaku, and that the Culling Game's purpose is to gather enough cursed energy to force evolution throughout all mankind in Japan by assimilating with the omnipresent Tengen, destroying the world. His previous attempts failed due to a Six Eyes user's presence and Tengen's assimilation with a Star Plasma Vessel, but between Toji's killing of Riko Amanai, (Note: As depicted in the second season's Hidden Inventory / Premature Death arc) Kenjaku acquiring Geto's body, and Gojo's sealing in the Prison Realm, his plan can now be completed. The sorcerers learn that the Culling Game will not end until every player is killed; however, they are allowed the creation of new rules, which they will use to free players. Tengen reveals they possess the "Back" of the Prison Realm, and that one of the players, the "Angel" Hana Kurusu, has a cursed technique capable of opening it. The group enact their plan: Choso and Yuki stay behind to protect Tengen, Maki will raid the Zen'in clan vault for cursed tools, Yuta will investigate a Game colony, and Yuji and Megumi will recruit Kinji Hakari, a third-year suspended from Jujutsu High. Meanwhile, Fumihiko Takaba, a comedian lamenting his failed career, is unknowingly a player.
51	4	"Perfect Preparation"; Transliteration: "Ashi o Fukumu" (Japanese: 葦を啣む)	Directed by : Shōta Goshozono, Risa Suzuki & Yuusuke Sunouchi; Storyboarded by : Shōta Goshozono	Yosuke Yajima, Hiromi Niwa, Takako Shimizu & Sota Yamazaki	January 23, 2026
Maki returns to the Zen'in clan to find that Ogi has emptied the vault and wounded Mai. He defeats her and leaves them to be devoured by curses. When Mai resuscitates Maki, she dreams they are on a beach; knowing she will always keep Maki from reaching her potential as she lives, Mai sacrifices herself by creating a replica of Toji's katana, asking her to destroy the clan. With her Heavenly Restriction now as powerful as Toji's, Maki exorcises the curses and kills her father. The clan's fighting unit and elite sorcerers are sent, but she massacres them. Naoya finally confronts her and they engage in a destructive battle. Naoya seemingly overwhelms her with his projection technique, but as he attempts to deliver a blow at his maximum speed, Maki reveals her speed has transcended beyond his projections, brutally defeating him. She finds her mother, and slices her throat for submitting to the clan's abuse toward them. Naoya attempts to find Maki, but her mother stabs him with a knife in her last moments, admitting she is proud of the twins. Maki leaves Mai's body with Momo and leaves to kill the rest of the clan.
52	5	"Passion"; Transliteration: "Netsu" (Japanese: 熱)	Directed by : Masaomi Andō; Storyboarded by : Shōta Goshozono	Mitsue Mori & Yosuke Yajima	January 30, 2026
Principal Yaga is revealed to secretly hold power considerable for Special Grade, as he can create an army of autonomous cursed corpses like Panda, or Takeru, Kusakabe's nephew, whose soul he resurrected in a cursed corpse. Following the Shibuya Incident, his execution is carried out by Gakuganji, despairing Panda, who escaped custody with Kusakabe's help. Yuji and Megumi sign up for an illegal fight club for sorcerers, hosted by Hakari and fellow expelled third-year student from Jujutsu High, Kirara Hoshi. In a mock-match against Panda, Yuji impresses Hakari enough to get invited into his private security room. Panda advises them against revealing they're from Jujutsu High. Hakari wants to invite Yuji to be his champion and get rich together once his fight clubs are officially recognized by the higher-ups, but Yuji gives himself away, causing a stand-off with Hakari.
53	6	"Cog"; Transliteration: "Buhin" (Japanese: 部品)	Directed by : Seimei Kidokoro; Storyboarded by : Shōta Goshozono	Yosuke Yajima	February 6, 2026
Megumi and Panda infiltrate the compound, when they are spotted by Kirara, who warns Hakari. Megumi attempts to convince Kirara to help them, but they refuse on account of Jujutsu High's conservative board and don't believe that Gojo has been sealed. Kirara uses their Cursed Technique, which appropriates the Southern Cross, allowing them to repel Megumi and Panda away from themselves and Hakari's door. Megumi eventually deduces the technique's function and uses his Ten Shadows to defeat Kirara. He once again asks for their assistance, just as Hakari and Yuji bust onto the roof. Yuji endures several unguarded punches from Hakari, declaring himself as a cog in jujutsu society for the purpose of exorcising curses, and willing to do anything to accomplish it. Seeing his firm resolve convinces Hakari to assist them. A Kogane then appears to inform the sorcerers of a new rule added to the Culling Game, allowing all players to view each other's status. The player who created the rule, a reincarnated sorcerer named Hajime Kashimo, voices his frustration at being unable to find strong opponents, desiring to fight Sukuna.
54	7	"Tokyo Colony No. 1"; Transliteration: "Tōkyō Dai-Ichi Koronii (Ichi)" (Japanese: 東京第1結界(コロニー)①)	Directed by : Takeru Satō; Storyboarded by : Shōta Goshozono	Hiromi Niwa, Takako Shimizu, Tomomi Noda & Mitsue Mori	February 13, 2026
In a dream-like state, Kenjaku speaks to Sasaki, one of Yuji's old friends. He offers to help her leave the Sendai colony, thanking her for being friends with his son. After Panda informs the group of Yaga's death, Hakari agrees to help in order to use Megumi's position as the Zen'in clan head for his own benefit. They use the Kogane to look for players that possess enough points to add new rules, to allow the ability to trade points and leave the Culling Game. Alongside Kashimo, they learn the other player with enough points is Hiromi Higuruma; Hakari and Panda decide to enter the Tokyo No. 2 Colony to find Kashimo and Angel, who is supposedly also there, while Yuji and Megumi head to the Tokyo No. 1 Colony to find Higuruma. They enter the Colony but are immediately separated across the city. After fighting several sorcerers, Yuji meets an old classmate, Amai, who tells him where to find Higuruma. Simultaneously, Megumi encounters a woman, Remi, who also tells him where Higuruma is. However, Amai and Remi give them different locations.
55	8	"Tokyo Colony No. 1 - Part 2"; Transliteration: "Tōkyō Dai-Ichi Koronii (Ni)" (Japanese: 東京第1結界(コロニー)②)	Yōsuke Takada	Yosuke Yajima	February 27, 2026
Higuruma is a public defender who grew disillusioned with Japan's judicial system and his clients decrying him when he is unable to achieve favorable outcomes. When his emotional state breaks after his latest client is unfairly sentenced, Higuruma's cursed technique awakens, releasing an ominous shikigami as he declares a "retrial" in the court. In the present, Amai takes Yuji to the Tokyo Metropolitan Theatre in Ikebukuro, where Higuruma is stationed, while Remi lures Megumi to an apartment block in Shinjuku, to meet a reincarnated sorcerer, Reggie Star. Reggie is interested in Megumi and suggests working together, revealing his theories on the true purpose of the Culling Game; seeing as how the weakest players have already been culled, Reggie posits that Kenjaku has plans to drop a "bomb" on the remaining sorcerers. Yuji asks Higuruma to use his points to help end the Culling Game, but he refuses, believing the Game's rules are more just than society's way of administering justice. When Yuji challenges him, Higuruma activates his courtroom-themed Domain Expansion. Meanwhile, at an unknown location, Kenjaku meets with several men in a boardroom after receiving their invitation.
56	9	"Tokyo Colony No. 1 - Part 3"; Transliteration: "Tōkyō Dai-Ichi Koronii (San)" (Japanese: 東京第1結界(コロニー)③)	Directed by : Teppei Okuda; Storyboarded by : Shōta Goshozono	Yosuke Yajima, Hiromi Niwa & Tomomi Noda	March 6, 2026
Inside Higuruma's Domain, a target is trialled for a crime they've committed, with his shikigami, Judgeman, overseeing the case. Yuji is charged with entering a pachinko parlor while underage. When he claims he was merely using the bathroom, evidence provided reveals his intentions to gamble. Judgeman declares Yuji guilty and confiscates his cursed energy, allowing Higuruma to overwhelm him with his exceptional sorcerer abilities. Before he can be killed, Yuji demands a retrial, and they return to the Domain. He is then charged for the mass murder in Shibuya, which Yuji confesses to, sentencing him to death. Higuruma is granted a sword to execute him, but becomes shaken by Yuji's admission of guilt, aware that Sukuna was truly responsible. Recalling when he refused a promotion to become a judge, Higuruma releases his technique on the basis that he is innocent. After they talk about their shared experiences in guilt over killing, Higuruma uses his points to add a rule allowing Culling Game players to transfer points to one other. He gives one point to Yuji and leaves, intending to turn himself in for those he killed when the Game ends.
57	10	"Tokyo Colony No. 1 - Part 4"; Transliteration: "Tōkyō Dai-Ichi Koronii (Yon)" (Japanese: 東京第1結界(コロニー)④)	Directed by : Takumi Ichikawa; Storyboarded by : Shōta Goshozono	Yosuke Yajima, Takako Shimizu & Sota Yamazaki	March 13, 2026
Megumi is attacked by Reggie, Remi, and two more of Reggie's underlings, reluctantly saving Remi from an explosion caused by one of the underlings, Hazenoki. After Kogane informs the players of Yuji and Higuruma's new rule addition, Megumi kills Reggie's second underling, after which he is cornered by Reggie and Hazenoki. Suddenly, Takaba appears, stating he will help Megumi to make it an even fight. The three other sorcerers are completely befuddled by Takaba's nonsensical comedy routine, but when he demonstrates a great prowess with cursed energy, Megumi accepts his help, letting him handle Hazenoki, while he fights Reggie. The two fight across the colony, with Reggie using his cursed technique to manifest an endless amount of objects from the receipts attached to him. Megumi lures Reggie into a gymnasium, the latter seemingly getting the drop on him by overwhelming him with objects, but Megumi shocks Reggie by activating his Domain Expansion, using the gym to help complete it.
58	11	"Tokyo Colony No. 1 - Part 5"; Transliteration: "Tōkyō Dai-Ichi Koronii (Go)" (Japanese: 東京第1結界(コロニー)⑤)	Directed by : Risa Suzuki; Storyboarded by : Shōta Goshozono	Mitsue Mori, Hiromi Niwa & Tomomi Noda	March 20, 2026
Cornered inside Megumi's incomplete Domain, Reggie retaliates by summoning cars and a house in an attempt to crush him. However, Megumi undoes the Domain, and the weight of Reggie's summoned objects destroys the gym's floor, causing both to fall into the pool below. With Reggie's receipts now unusable, Megumi uses his Divine Dog to mortally wound him. Reggie commends his strength, before revealing he does not know either Kenjaku or Tengen enough to answer about the Culling Game's true purpose. Before dying, he gives all of his points to Megumi. Meanwhile, Hazenoki continually fails to harm Takaba, whose Comedian Cursed Technique allows whatever he thinks to be funny to manifest into reality, nullifying any damage he receives. Hazenoki's Kogane informs him of Reggie's death, prompting him to leave. Megumi attempts to kill the defenseless Remi, but Tsumiki's words stop him and he collapses from his wounds, just as Angel lowers down upon him. Elsewhere, in the Sendai Colony, Yuta disrupts a four-way deadlock between its strongest players, Takako Uro, Ryu Ishigori, the special-grade cursed spirit Kurourushi, and foreign sorcerer Dhruv Lakdawalla, by killing the latter.
59	12	"Sendai Colony"; Transliteration: "Sendai Koronii" (Japanese: 仙台結界(コロニー))	Directed by : Yōsuke Takada, Takeru Satō, Ryota Aikei, Shinya Iino, Hiroki Yamamoto, Takumi Sunakohara & Hiroshi Kobayashi; Storyboarded by : Shōta Goshozono & Itsuki Tsuchigami	Yosuke Yajima, Hiromi Niwa, Sota Yamazaki, Takako Shimizu, Mitsue Mori & Tomomi Noda	March 27, 2026
Yuta uses Rika to protect civilians caught in the colony, while he engages Kurourushi. After he exorcises the cursed spirit, Uro suddenly attacks him, her technique allowing her to manipulate the fabric of space around her. As they clash, Ishigori then appears and fends her off, able to fire powerful blasts of cursed energy. Hoping Yuta will satisfy his hunger for battle, they engage in a fierce fight. When Uro reappears, Yuta summons Rika to battle her and use her cursed energy. The confrontation reaches a stalemate, leading them to enter a three-way Domain Expansion, but it is disrupted by a nascent second incarnation of Kurourushi. After Ishigori defeats Uro and Yuta exorcises Kurourushi again, the two face off once more, with Yuta deciding to go all-out in order to grant Ishigori his desired "feast". Using his own technique, Copy, Yuta defeats Ishigori by weakening him with Uro's technique, before blasting him with his own redirected attack. After Yuta heals them, they give him their points. Uro warns him that he won't be able to grow stronger so long as he fights for others, pointing to how the most powerful sorcerers all have egos and fight for themselves alone.

== Recap special ==
No. overall	No. in season	Title	Original release date
54.5	SP	"The Culling Game: Special Episode"; Transliteration: "Shimetsu Kaiyū: Zenpen - Kanwa" (Japanese: ｢死滅回游 前編｣ 閑話)	February 20, 2026
A recap special covering events from the first seven episodes of the third season

== Music ==
The opening theme song is "AIZO," performed by King Gnu, who also created the opening song for the Shibuya Incident Arc of Season 2.

The ending theme song is "Yoake no Uta" (よあけのうた; lit. 'Song of Dawn'), performed by Jo0ji.

== Home media release ==
=== Japanese ===
Vol.		Discs	Episodes	Date	Ref.
The Culling Game: Part 1 (Note: Shimetsu Kaiyū: Zenpen (死滅回游 前編))	1	2	48–50	April 15, 2026	
The Culling Game: Part 1	2	2	51–53	May 20, 2026	
The Culling Game: Part 1	3	2	54–56	June 17, 2026	
The Culling Game: Part 1	4	2	57–59	July 15, 2026	
