= Hibiki Yoshizaki =

Japanese animator

- Born: March 10, 1980 (age 45); Tokyo, Japan
- Occupations: Video artist, animator, music video director, art director, motion graphics designer
- Known for: ME!ME!ME! GIRL; Kirai, Demo, Suki; Eve's Mob (Bōto)

Signature
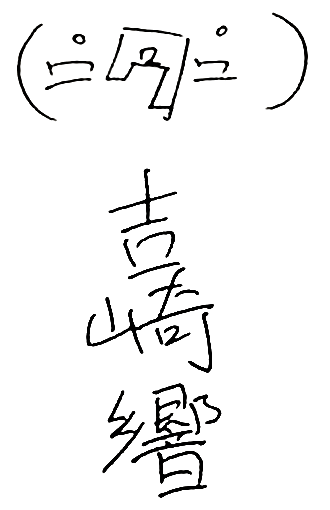

Hibiki Yoshizaki (吉崎 響, Yoshizaki Hibiki; born March 10, 1980) is a Japanese video artist, animator, music video director, art director, and motion graphics designer. He is best known for his animated music videos "ME!ME!ME!" and "GIRL," which gained mainstream popularity both in Japan and internationally after being submitted to the Japan Animator Expo. He also works as VJ Cotobuki with Naoki Nagayasu.

== Biography ==
Yoshizaki was born in Tokyo, Japan. At the age of 16, he was deeply impressed by Kōji Morimoto's MV "Extra" (music by Ken Ishii), which inspired him to work in animation. As a high school student, he started working in Gainax under the guidance of Hiroyuki Yamaga. He then entered Tama Art University and started working as a VJ in nightclubs all around Tokyo while studying animation under the mentorship of Kōji Morimoto at Studio 4°C.

After graduation, he became a freelance motion graphics designer and art director, mainly for animated music videos and promotional videos. In 2011, for making Clammbon's Kanade Dance MV, he was selected as one of the top 100 video artists of the year in a magazine published by BNN Shinsha, Japan. In 2014, he created the first-two original animated music videos "ME!ME!ME!" and "GIRL" in collaboration with TeddyLoid and Daoko. It was made as the 3rd and 31st episode of Japan Animator Expo, which has gone viral with over 100 million views on YouTube and achieved the highest number of views among all 36 episodes in the project. After working as a freelance art director for 18 years, he joined Khara in 2016.

In 2022, Yoshizaki collaborated with Eve to produce an animated music video, "Mob (Bōto)", which also featured in a musical film, Adam by Eve: A Live in Animation in collaboration with Netflix. Loosely inspired by George Orwell's novel 1984, the visuals depict the story of a masked high school girl who struggles with an existential crisis and begins to become aware of her mundane existence after realizing she is being constantly watched and controlled by nightmarish one-eyed entities.

== Selected works ==
=== Television series ===
Year	Television	Notes
2008	Macross Frontier	Motion graphics
2013	AKB0048: Next Stage	Opening director and storyboard artist
2024	Kaiju No. 8	Opening director

=== OVAs ===
Year	OVA	Notes
2003-2004	Macross Zero	Motion graphics
2005	Gundam Evolve	CG
2013	Yozakura Quartet: Hana no Uta	Opening director, storyboard artist, and motion graphics
2013-2014	Yozakura Quartet: Tsuki ni Naku	Opening director, storyboard artist
2014	Psycho-Pass 2	Subtitle design

=== Films ===
Year	Film	Notes
2010	Halo Legends	Display designer (The Package)
2012	Evangelion: 3.0 You Can (Not) Redo	Motion graphics director and design works
2013	Harlock: Space Pirate	Title logo design
2017	The Dragon Dentist	Unit director and storyboard artist
2021	Evangelion: 3.0+1.0 Thrice Upon a Time	Storyboard artist

=== Music videos ===
Year	Music video	Artist	Notes	Ref
2014	ME!ME!ME!	TeddyLoid feat. Daoko	Director, unit director, editor, compositor, storyboard artist, visual effects, and original creator	
2015	ME!ME!ME! CHRONIC	TeddyLoid feat. Daoko	Director, storyboard artist, and original creator	
2015	GIRL	Daoko	Director, storyboard artist, and original creator	
2016	Sakura Nagashi	Hikaru Utada	Director	
2016	The Asahi Shimbun	Motohiro Onishi	Director	
2022	Adam by Eve: A Live in Animation: Mob (Bōto)	Eve	Director	

=== Other MV ===
Year	Music video	Artist	Notes
2007	Believe	i-dep	Director
2009	Room #204	Jazztronik	Director
2010	KANADE DANCE	Clammbon	Director

=== Video games ===
Year	Video game	Notes
2003	Star Ocean: Till the End of Time	Item designer
2013	Ace Combat Infinity	Cinematics and motion graphics
2019	Ace Combat 7: Skies Unknown	Cinematics director

=== Commercials ===
Year	Commercial	Notes
2016	HAL Tokyo College of Technology & Design: Kirai, Demo, Suki	Director

== Awards and recognition ==
Year	Ceremony	Award	Nominated work	Result
2014	MTV Video Music Awards Japan	Best Animation Video	"ME!ME!ME!" by TeddyLoid feat. Daoko	Won
2014	Japan Media Arts Festival	Grand Prize for Animation	"ME!ME!ME!" by TeddyLoid feat. Daoko	Won
2015	Tokyo Anime Award	Best Music Video	"GIRL" by Daoko	Won
