= Kaikai Kitan =

Single by Eve

from the album Kaizin
- Language: Japanese
- Released: October 3, 2020
- Recorded: 2020
- Studio: Aobadai Studio (Meguro, Tokyo, Japan)
- Genre: J-pop; anime song
- Length: 3:39
- Label: Toy's Factory
- Songwriter: Eve
- Producer: Eve

Eve singles chronology
"Hakugin" (2019)	"Kaikai Kitan" (2020)	"Yakusoku" (2020)

Music video
- "Kaikai Kitan" on YouTube

"Kaikai Kitan" (Japanese: 廻廻奇譚; lit. 'round round mysterious story') is a song by Japanese singer-songwriter Eve. Released as a digital single on October 3, 2020, through Toy's Factory, it served as the first opening theme song for the first season of the Japanese anime series Jujutsu Kaisen.

== Background and release ==
On August 11, 2020, it was announced that the song would be used as the opening theme song for the anime adaptation of the manga series Jujutsu Kaisen, which was set to air in October. Its release date was revealed on September 19, with the third promotional video of the animation using the song releasing on YouTube the same day.

As a big fan of the series, Eve said he was "deeply moved" by the opportunity to sing the opening theme, and commented as follows:

There were many moments when Itadori's life and fights made me reflect. I was thinking about how I could accompany this energetic work, and so I created the music.

— Eve

== Composition and lyrics ==
"Kaikai Kitan" is a J-pop song, composed in the key of F minor and is set in time signature of common time with a tempo of 93 BPM.

The song is an upper tune characterized by a fast and heavy sound and dramatically developing melody. While the sound of the first verse is based on a fast band sound with solid guitars, the arrangement switches to a trap-like mid-tempo groove in the A-melody section of the second verse.

Producing the song, Eve said reread the manga from the first volume to the last and redefined the image of the work. He stated that he first produced a 90-second demo and then, at the request of the anime director, added a large chorus-like development to the chorus part to add a violent melody. On the production, Eve said, "I think my voice is pretty light, so they made me think about how to sing a heavy, dark, fast-paced song with that voice. I hadn't been conscious of my songwriting until now, so it was a song that I had a deep feeling for".

Some of the lyrics overlap the plot of Jujutsu Kaisen, with many phrases recalling the fate of the protagonist, Yuji Itadori, and foreshadowing future events.

== Music video ==
The music video is directed by Yuichiro Saeki and uses footage from the anime. It was released on YouTube on November 20, 2020, and surpassed 100 million views on April 13, 2021.

On March 26, 2021, a live performance video was released on YouTube to celebrate the song reaching 100 million streams.

== Critical reception ==
Satoru Ryusei of Real Sound commented that "we can enjoy the sound, something very typical of anime songs, and at the same time, it seems to represent the light and dark sides of sorcerers who have their own dark pasts and bitter experiences and yet move forward with their own beliefs". Kari Komatsu of Rockin'On Japan says, "the song is less than four minutes long, but is infused with a wealth of sounds and arrangements, including effective vocal effects, and vividly reflects the struggle to get through a chaotic world."

When writing the opening for the second season of Jujutsu Kaisen, "Where Our Blue Is", artist Tatsuya Kitani was influenced by "Kaikai Kitan".

== Credits and personnel ==
Credits adapted from the liner notes.

- Eve – vocals, songwriter, composer, producer, chorus
- Tomoki Numanō / Numa – arranger, guitar
- Masaki Hori – drums, beat programmer
- Taku Inoue – beat programmer
- Yoshio Arimatsu / Masuo – drum technician
- Kaisei-P – vocal editor
- Masashi Uramoto – recording engineer, mixing engineer, mastering engineer
- Miyuki Nakamura, Masayuki Yoshī – assistant engineer

== Charts ==
=== Weekly charts ===
Weekly chart performance for "Kaikai Kitan"
Chart (2020-2022)	Peak position
Global 200 (Billboard)	111
Japan Combined Singles (Oricon)	7
Japan (Japan Hot 100)	7
Japan Hot Animation (Billboard Japan)	2

=== Year-end charts ===
2020 year-end chart performance for "Kaikai Kitan"
Chart (2020)	Position
Japan Hot Animation (Billboard Japan)	16

2021 year-end chart performance for "Kaikai Kitan"
Chart (2021)	Position
Global Excl. US (Billboard)	124
Japan Hot 100 (Billboard)	10
Japan Hot Animation (Billboard Japan)	4

2022 year-end chart performance for "Kaikai Kitan"
Chart (2022)	Position
Japan Hot 100 (Billboard)	49
Japan Hot Animation (Billboard Japan)	14

=== All-time charts ===
All-time chart performance for "Kaikai Kitan"
Chart (2008–2022)	Position
Japan (Japan Hot 100)	35

== Certifications ==
Certifications for "Kaikai Kitan"
Region	Certification	Certified units/sales
Streaming
Japan (RIAJ)	3× Platinum	300,000,000^{†}
^{†} Streaming-only figures based on certification alone.

== Accolades ==
Awards and nominations for "Kaikai Kitan"
Ceremony	Year	Award	Result	Ref.
5th Crunchyroll Anime Awards	2021	Best Opening Sequence	Nominated	
43rd Anime Grand Prix	2021	Best Theme Song	2nd place	
