= Jujutsu Kaisen: Cursed Clash =

2024 video game

- Cover art
- Developers: Byking; Gemdrops
- Publisher: Bandai Namco Entertainment
- Directors: Takuya Nagashima; Isao Takeda
- Producers: Yuichiro Kitao; Misaki Kai
- Designer: Takeru Imai
- Programmer: Tomoyuki Kurino
- Composers: Mitsuhiro Tabata; Daisuke Nakajima; Kousuke Koizumi
- Series: Jujutsu Kaisen
- Engine: Unreal Engine 4
- Platforms: Nintendo Switch; PlayStation 4; PlayStation 5; Windows; Xbox One; Xbox Series X/S
- Release: JP: February 1, 2024; WW: February 2, 2024
- Genre: Fighting
- Modes: Single-player, multiplayer

Jujutsu Kaisen: Cursed Clash (Note: Known in Japan as Jujutsu Kaisen: Senka Sōran (呪術廻戦 戦華双乱)) is a fighting game co-developed by Byking and Gemdrops, and published by Bandai Namco Entertainment. Based on the 2020 anime adaptation of Gege Akutami's manga series, Jujutsu Kaisen, the game was released on February 1, 2024, in Japan for the Nintendo Switch, PlayStation 4, PlayStation 5, Windows, Xbox One, and Xbox Series X/S, which was followed by a worldwide release the next day on February 2. It received generally mixed-to-negative reviews due to a lackluster story mode, small character roster, poor netcode, and an underwhelming co-op mode.

== Gameplay and plot ==
Adapted from the events of the first season of the anime series and the film Jujutsu Kaisen 0, the game's single player story mode follows Yuji Itadori, the series' protagonist, as he faces off against various monsters (known as "Curses") in order to save humankind in modern-day Japan.

Cursed Clash features 16 playable characters in the base game, where players form teams of two fighters from the roster and battle CPU opponents or other people online. Additional playable characters have been released as both paid and free downloadable content, as well as two new story chapters based on the anime series' second season.

=== Roster ===
Base game

- Aoi Todo
- Eso & Kechizu
- Hanami
- Jogo
- Kento Nanami
- Mahito
- Maki Zen'in
- Megumi Fushiguro
- Nobara Kugisaki
- Panda
- Ryomen Sukuna
- Satoru Gojo
- Suguru Geto
- Toge Inumaki
- Yuji Itadori
- Yuta Okkotsu

Additional characters (DLC)

- Satoru Gojo (Young) ^{P}
- Suguru Geto (Young) ^{P}
- Toji Fushiguro ^{P}
- Mai Zen'in ^{F}
- Momo Nishimiya ^{F}
- Noritoshi Kamo ^{F}
- Kasumi Miwa ^{F}
- Ultimate Mechamaru ^{F}
- Mei Mei ^{P}
- Naobito Zen'in ^{P}
- Choso ^{P}

^P Paid downloadable content
^F Added in a free update

== Development ==
The game was announced in July 2023 by Bandai Namco at Anime Expo.

== Reception ==
Reception

Aggregate scores
Aggregator	Score
Metacritic	PS4: 44/100; XSXS: 50/100
OpenCritic	11% recommend

Review score
Publication	Score
Eurogamer	PC: 1/5

Jujutsu Kaisen: Cursed Clash received mixed-to-negative reviews according to the review aggregation website Metacritic. Fellow review aggregator OpenCritic assessed that the game received weak approval, being recommended by 11% of critics.

Lewis Parker of Eurogamer panned the game as "a product disguised as a game" and "the epitome of every pitfall the [arena fighter] genre consistently falls into," criticizing its shallow and unbalanced gameplay, poor visuals, pointless story mode, and terrible online experience. Similarly, Jason Hon of Screen Rant gave the game a 2.5/5 score, finding fault with its "unbalanced, clunky, and frustrating" gameplay, disappointing story mode consisting mainly of "image slideshows with uninspired voice acting," and lack of local multiplayer. Both reviewers felt that despite some promising ideas and "well-constructed animations," Cursed Clash ultimately failed to live up to the potential of a fighting game adaptation of such a popular series as Jujutsu Kaisen, with Parker arguing it was an obvious attempt to capitalize on the IP's popularity without providing a quality gaming experience.
