= Jujutsu Kaisen season 1 =

First season of Jujutsu Kaisen

Jujutsu Kaisen
- Season 1
- Cover of the first Blu-ray volume of the season, featuring Yuji Itadori (foreground) and Ryomen Sukuna (background)
- No. of episodes: 24

Release
- Original network: MBS, TBS
- Original release: October 3, 2020 – March 27, 2021

Season chronology
- Next → Season 2

The first season of the Jujutsu Kaisen anime television series is based on the manga series Jujutsu Kaisen by Gege Akutami. An animated adaptation of the manga was announced in the 52nd issue of Weekly Shōnen Jump, which was published in November 2019. The story focuses on high school student Yuji Itadori as he joins a secret organization of Jujutsu Sorcerers in order to kill a powerful Curse named Ryomen Sukuna, to whom Yuji becomes the host.

The season was produced by MAPPA and directed by Sunghoo Park. Hiroshi Seko wrote the scripts, Tadashi Hiramatsu designed the characters, and Hiroaki Tsutsumi, Yoshimasa Terui, and Alisa Okehazama composed the music. While the anime had an advanced streaming debut on September 19th, 2020, it officially aired on MBS and TBS's Super Animeism programming block from October 3rd, 2020, to March 27nd, 2021. (Note: MBS listed the air dates for the series as Friday at 25:25, which is effectively Saturday at 1:25 a.m. JST.) The season ran for 24 episodes. From episode 3 onwards the season includes post-credits anime shorts titled "Juju Sanpo" (呪術さんぽ; lit. "Jujutsu Strolling" or "Juju Stroll"), which focus on the daily lives of the main characters. A Japanese home media collection was released, with its first volume debuting on January 20th, 2021.

The anime is licensed by Crunchyroll for streaming outside of Asia. The streaming service has released dubs for the series in English, Spanish, Portuguese, French, and German, in addition to a Russian voice-over that premiered on November 20th, 2020. In Southeast Asia, Medialink licensed the series and streamed it on iQIYI.

== Episodes ==
No. overall	No. in season	Title	Directed by (Note: Production staff information is taken from the ending credits of each episode.)	Chief animation directed by	Original release date
1	1	"Ryomen Sukuna" (Japanese: 両面宿儺)	Directed by : Yui Umemoto; Storyboarded by : Tadashi Hiramatsu	Tadashi Hiramatsu	October 3, 2020 (Note: Episode 1 had an advanced streaming debut on September 19, 2020.)
Yuji Itadori is a high school student with exceptional athletic ability who counterintuitively spends time with his friends at the Occult Research Club. Before dying, Yuji's grandfather advises him to use his strength to help others. Megumi Fushiguro, a first-year student from Tokyo Jujutsu High, is dispatched to retrieve a "cursed object" hidden at Yuji's school—one of the twenty severed fingers of Ryomen Sukuna, a sadistic ancient sorcerer. Megumi tracks the finger's energy to Yuji and discovers that it is with his friends. He fights the curses attacking them and is joined by Yuji, who can see the curses and remembers his grandfather's words. In an attempt to save themselves, Yuji swallows the finger, unwittingly becoming the physical host of Sukuna. However, to Megumi's surprise, Yuji retains control over his body and easily suppresses Sukuna. Nevertheless, Megumi deems him a threat and prepares to exorcise him.
2	2	"For Myself"; Transliteration: "Jibun no Tameni" (Japanese: 自分のために)	Ryōhei Takeshita	Sayaka Koiso	October 10, 2020
Satoru Gojo, a powerful sorcerer and Megumi's teacher, arrives and effortlessly defeats Sukuna. He tells Yuji that the jujutsu higher-ups have ordered his execution due to Sukuna's possession, but Gojo has managed to delay the sentence. Since Sukuna's power is divided among twenty of his preserved fingers, which have been classified as special grade cursed objects, Gojo proposes that Yuji consume all of them, as doing so would allow Sukuna to be fully destroyed—along with Yuji himself. Yuji agrees to the plan, choosing to sacrifice himself to protect others, and consumes a second finger. Gojo then brings him to Tokyo Jujutsu High to begin his training as a sorcerer alongside Megumi and other students.
3	3	"Girl of Steel"; Transliteration: "Tekkotsu Musume" (Japanese: 鉄骨娘)	Directed by : Kakushi Ifuku; Storyboarded by : Hiroaki Andō	Takako Shimizu	October 17, 2020
Yuji, Megumi, and Gojo recruit Nobara Kugisaki, the third and last first-year student. As part of her field training, Gojo takes them to an abandoned building inhabited by curses, where Nobara encounters a curse holding a young boy hostage. Nobara initially surrenders, but Yuji intervenes to help her, allowing Nobara to defeat the curse. A flashback reveals that Nobara once had an older friend named Saori who moved to the countryside but was ostracized by the locals for being from the city, motivating Nobara to leave her hometown and move to Tokyo. Approximately one month later, the trio is sent to a detention center to exorcise a powerful cursed womb, nascent curses that eventually grow more powerful.
4	4	"Curse Womb Must Die"; Transliteration: "Jutai Taiten" (Japanese: 呪胎戴天)	Directed by : Hideaki Abe; Storyboarded by : Yoshiaki Kawajiri	Terumi Nishii & Takako Shimizu	October 24, 2020
Yuji, Megumi, and Nobara investigate the detention center. Kiyotaka Ijichi, assistant director at Jujutsu High, conceals the building from ordinary citizens using a barrier. Upon entering, the trio discovers that the prison has become nightmarish and that the inmates have been brutally murdered. They are then attacked by a special grade curse which Yuji fights, while Megumi rescues Nobara and escapes. During the fight, Yuji's left hand is severed, prompting him to release Sukuna. Sukuna quickly kills the curse, regenerates Yuji's hand, and retrieves one of his own fingers that had been powering the curse. Sukuna then waits for Yuji to regain control but, to his surprise, Yuji does not respond.
5	5	"Curse Womb Must Die -II-"; Transliteration: "Jutai Taiten -Ni-" (Japanese: 呪胎戴天－弐－)	Directed by : Yōsuke Takada; Storyboarded by : Yoshiaki Kawajiri	Yumi Kobayashi	October 31, 2020
Sukuna confronts Megumi and forcibly removes Yuji's heart, intending that if control switches back, Yuji will die while Sukuna retains control of the body. Sukuna defeats Megumi but becomes intrigued by his potential. Megumi reveals that his will to save others stems from witnessing his sister fall into a coma due to a curse, and expresses no regret for sparing Yuji. Yuji regains control of his body briefly and bids farewell to Megumi before dying. Days later, second-year students Maki Zen'in, Toge Inumaki, and Panda inform Megumi and Nobara about their upcoming participation in an inter-school competition with Kyoto Jujutsu High. Meanwhile, three curses meet with Suguru Geto, a human Curse User who plans to seal away Gojo and recruit Sukuna to his cause. While Yuji's body is examined by doctor Shoko Ieiri, he awakes in Sukuna's domain.
6	6	"After Rain"; Transliteration: "Ugo" (Japanese: 雨後)	Eri Nagata	Eri Nagata	November 7, 2020
Megumi and Nobara train alongside the second-year students in preparation for the competition scheduled for the following month. Meanwhile, Sukuna manipulates Yuji into making a pact in which Sukuna can temporarily take control of Yuji's body for one minute by uttering the word "Enchain", with the condition that he cannot harm anyone during that time. Yuji is then resurrected without memory of the pact. Gojo tells Shoko to delay reporting Yuji's revival, intending to keep it secret as long as possible, as he is aware that the Jujutsu higher-ups orchestrated Yuji's death. Gojo begins training Yuji to control his cursed energy. Geto instructs the curse Jogo to use the special grade cursed object Prison Realm to seal Gojo, whom Geto deems too powerful to kill. Jogo, however, vows to kill Gojo and ambushes him while he is en route to meet the principal of Tokyo Jujutsu High.
7	7	"Assault"; Transliteration: "Kyūshū" (Japanese: 急襲)	Directed by : Sunghoo Park; Storyboarded by : Takahiro Shikama	Yumi Kobayashi	November 14, 2020
After Jogo's failed attempts to kill Gojo, Gojo demonstrates his innate cursed technique, explaining that he manipulates the flow of cursed energy to create an "Infinity" barrier that slows down attacks, therefore rendering them unable to touch him. He briefly teleports to Jujutsu High, takes Yuji, and returns within seconds to teach him about Domain Expansions. Gojo counters Jogo's Domain Expansion with his, overwhelming Jogo and allowing Gojo to decapitate him. Before they can interrogate him, however, the curse Hanami escapes with Jogo's head. Geto, Jogo, Hanami, and the recently manifested curse Mahito regroup in their realm, plotting to seal Gojo using the Prison Realm and release Sukuna.
8	8	"Boredom"; Transliteration: "Taikutsu" (Japanese: 退屈)	Directed by : Shōta Goshozono; Storyboarded by : Tetsuo Hirakawa	Terumi Nishii	November 21, 2020
Nobara and Megumi meet Kyoto Jujutsu High second-year students Mai Zen'in—Maki's twin sister—and third-year Aoi Todo. Todo challenges Megumi to a fight and quickly overpowers him, nearly pushing him to his breaking point before Panda and Toge intervene. Maki tells Nobara that she is unable to use cursed energy and instead relies on cursed tools in combat. At Jujutsu High, Gojo confronts Kyoto's principal, Yoshinobu Gakuganji, accusing him of deliberately endangering the Tokyo first-years during the cursed womb mission. He warns Gakuganji of the threat posed by powerful curses like Jogo and Sukuna and stresses the talent of students such as Yuta Okkotsu and Yuji, suggesting that the jujutsu world is on the brink of change. A month later, Mahito kills three high school students in a movie theater and is approached by a teenage boy who is able to see him.
9	9	"Small Fry and Reverse Retribution"; Transliteration: "Yōgyo to Sakabachi" (Japanese: 幼魚と逆罰)	Ryōhei Takeshita	Sayaka Koiso	November 28, 2020
High school student Junpei Yoshino skips class to watch a movie but witnesses his bullies die when their faces are grotesquely transfigured. He follows Mahito, a curse born from human hatred, and asks him for help in learning how to control cursed energy. Mahito begins indoctrinating Junpei with his nihilistic views on human existence. Meanwhile, Yuji teams up with Kento Nanami, a former salaryman turned jujutsu sorcerer, to investigate the incident. During a battle against two curses, Yuji uncovers his cursed technique, which involves using cursed energy to enhance his punches and physical strength. Nanami determines that the curses are actually humans who have been transformed. He sends Yuji and Ijichi to investigate Junpei, while he confronts Mahito directly.
10	10	"Idle Transfiguration"; Transliteration: "Mui Tenpen" (Japanese: 無為転変)	Ken Takahashi	Yumi Kobayashi	December 5, 2020
Mahito reveals that as a curse who can manipulate the shape of souls, he views human life as expendable. Encouraged by the idea that killing can be justified without guilt, Junpei confronts his teacher who had previously ignored his bullying, and prepares to kill him before Yuji intervenes. Meanwhile, Nanami engages Mahito in the sewers and discovers that Mahito's transfigured humans are still alive and enduring immense suffering. When Nanami exceeds his designated "work hours", he removes his self-imposed limits and begins fighting at full strength, catching Mahito off guard.
11	11	"Narrow-minded"; Transliteration: "Korōshungu" (Japanese: 固陋蠢愚)	Directed by : Daisuke Tsukushi; Storyboarded by : Miyuki Ōshiro	Eri Nagata	December 12, 2020
Although Nanami easily defeats Mahito, the curse escapes by reshaping his own soul to alter his body. Meanwhile, Yuji befriends Junpei over their shared love for movies. During dinner with Junpei and his mother, Yuji tells Junpei his belief that killing would diminish his ability to value human life and relationships. That night, Junpei's mother is killed when a curse, drawn to one of Sukuna's fingers planted by Mahito, attacks their home. Mahito manipulates Junpei into believing that his former bully Shota Ito is responsible. As Mahito intends, a vengeful Junpei lures Yuji to the school just as he prepares to kill Ito.
12	12	"To You, Someday"; Transliteration: "Itsuka no Kimi e" (Japanese: いつかの君へ)	Directed by : Masataka Akai; Storyboarded by : Fuminori Kizaki	Takako Shimizu	December 19, 2020
Disillusioned by his experiences and believing that humans lack compassion, Junpei confronts Yuji using his cursed technique: a jellyfish-shaped shikigami capable of poisoning its targets. Yuji attempts to reason with Junpei and encourages him to enroll at Jujutsu High. However, Mahito arrives and reveals his manipulation. Junpei tries to resist, but Mahito quickly transfigures him into a mutated creature. Yuji desperately pleads with Sukuna to save Junpei, but Sukuna mocks him and refuses, joining Mahito in laughing at Yuji's helplessness. Junpei dies in front of Yuji, causing him to break down and attack Mahito in a rage; his blows are able to damage the curse's physical body and soul. Mahito attempts to transfigure Yuji as well, but Sukuna intervenes, warning Mahito not to touch his vessel again. Nanami arrives and joins Yuji in battle, vowing to exorcise Mahito together.
13	13	"Tomorrow"; Transliteration: "Mata Ashita" (Japanese: また明日)	Hironori Tanaka	Terumi Nishii	December 26, 2020
Nanami and Yuji exploit Mahito's vulnerabilities and gain the upper hand in battle. Cornered, Mahito activates his Domain Expansion and traps Nanami inside. Believing his death is imminent, Nanami reflects on his past and his reasons for returning to Jujutsu High, having felt his life lacked purpose until he exorcised a minor curse afflicting a bakery cashier. Meanwhile, Yuji breaks into Mahito's Domain Expansion, and in the ensuing attack, Mahito accidentally makes contact with Sukuna's soul for a second time. In retaliation, Sukuna gravely injures him, forcing Mahito to flee. A shaken Yuji tells Nanami that he was forced to kill a person and vows to never lose again.
14	14	"Kyoto Sister School Exchange Event – Group Battle 0 -"; Transliteration: "Kyōto Shimai-kō Kōryū-kai－Dantai-sen (Zero)－" (Japanese: 京都姉妹校交流会－団体戦⓪－)	Directed by : Chie Nishizawa; Storyboarded by : Miyuki Ōshiro	Anri Yamazaki	January 16, 2021
Geto, along with the regenerated Jogo and Mahito, continues planning their next move. He declares their plan to collect all of Sukuna's fingers to fully restore him, starting with an attack on Tokyo Jujutsu High. Meanwhile, the Kyoto students arrive for the exchange event, and Yuji surprises his classmates by revealing he is still alive, having remained hidden for two months. The event consists of two rounds, beginning with a team competition between the Tokyo and Kyoto schools. Acting on Gakuganji's orders, several Kyoto students secretly conspire to kill Yuji under the pretense of an accident, as they also believe him to be too dangerous as Sukuna's vessel. Separately, Gojo tells Kyoto teacher Utahime Iori that he suspects a traitor exists within Tokyo Jujutsu High.
15	15	"Kyoto Sister School Exchange Event – Group Battle 1 -"; Transliteration: "Kyōto Shimai-kō Kōryū-kai－Dantai-sen (Ichi)－" (Japanese: 京都姉妹校交流会－団体戦①－)	Hideaki Abe	Eri Nagata	January 23, 2021
The Kyoto students begin their ambush on Yuji; however, flashbacks reveal that the Tokyo team had anticipated this and devised a strategy to divide their opponents and level the playing field. Yuji engages in a hand-to-hand fight with Aoi Todo, who unexpectedly opposes the plan to kill him. When Yuji's preference in women aligns with Todo's, Todo becomes instantly fond of him and begins fantasizing their close friendship. Meanwhile, Megumi fights Noritoshi Kamo, and Kasumi Miwa prepares to fight Maki.
16	16	"Kyoto Sister School Exchange Event – Group Battle 2 -"; Transliteration: "Kyōto Shimai-kō Kōryū-kai－Dantai-sen (Ni)－" (Japanese: 京都姉妹校交流会－団体戦②－)	Masato Nakazono	Terumi Nishii	January 30, 2021
During their fight, Todo teaches Yuji how to better control his cursed energy. Elsewhere, Nobara is knocked out by a non-lethal sniper attack from Mechamaru. Panda engages Mechamaru, revealing himself to be a Cursed Corpse created by the Principal, containing three distinct cores that allow him to switch between different forms when one is damaged. Mechamaru is also revealed to be a puppet operated remotely by Kokichi Muta, who has a severely incapacitated body and compensates for his physical limitations by channeling cursed energy through mechanical proxies. During their battle, Panda's "Gorilla" form emerges and defeats Mechamaru.
17	17	"Kyoto Sister School Exchange Event – Group Battle 3 -"; Transliteration: "Kyōto Shimai-kō Kōryū-kai－Dantai-sen (San)－" (Japanese: 京都姉妹校交流会－団体戦③－)	Shōta Goshozono	Sayaka Koiso	February 6, 2021
Miwa is defeated by Maki after underestimating her lack of cursed energy. Nobara fights Momo Nishimiya and is close to victory before being incapacitated by a shot from Mai's revolver. Maki then faces Mai, with flashbacks revealing the twins' childhood within the Zen'in clan. Maki left the clan determined to become a powerful sorcerer and eventually lead the family, while Mai remained and was forced to serve as a sorcerer in her sister's stead, later resenting Maki for abandoning her. Mai attempts to shoot her with a cursed energy-imbued bullet, but Maki catches it barehanded, revealing that although she lacks cursed energy, she possesses superhuman strength contributing to her combat ability. Following their defeats, Mai and Nobara are eliminated from the event.
18	18	"Sage"; Transliteration: "Kenja" (Japanese: 賢者)	Directed by : Yōsuke Takada; Storyboarded by : Fuminori Kizaki	Yumi Kobayashi	February 13, 2021
Miwa is eliminated after Toge manipulates her to fall asleep during the match. Toge is then pursued by Hanami, whose arrival abruptly ends the exchange event. While Megumi and Noritoshi are engaged in battle, they see Toge fleeing and are urged by him to escape, but the curse blocks their path. The sorcerers responsible for the Hanami's invasion erect a large barrier around the area that prevents Gojo from entering but allows others to come and go freely. Toge, Megumi, and Noritoshi are left to confront Hanami.
19	19	"Black Flash"; Transliteration: "Kokusen" (Japanese: 黒閃)	Ryū Nakayama	Terumi Nishii	February 20, 2021
Hanami easily shrugs off the combined attacks of Toge, Megumi, Noritoshi, and Maki. Before it can kill Maki, Yuji and Todo arrive to intervene as Panda and Momo evacuate the remaining students. During the ensuing battle, Yuji demonstrates his mastery of the Black Flash technique, which he learned from Todo. In response, Hanami reveals a concealed second arm to continue fighting both sorcerers.
20	20	"Nonstandard"; Transliteration: "Kikaku-gai" (Japanese: 規格外)	Directed by : Masataka Akai; Storyboarded by : Fuminori Kizaki	Takako Shimizu	February 27, 2021
Todo reveals his innate technique, Boogie Woogie, which allows him to instantly switch the positions of two targets imbued with cursed energy. The combined offenses of Boogie Woogie and Yuji's Black Flash quickly overwhelms Hanami. Before it can activate its Domain Expansion, Gojo dispels the barrier surrounding the battlefield after easily incapacitating Juzo, one of the intruders. He then unleashes a devastating wave of cursed energy, obliterating half the surrounding forest and forcing Hanami to retreat. Meanwhile, Mahito is revealed to have acquired another of Sukuna's fingers.
21	21	"Jujutsu Koshien" (Japanese: 呪術甲子園)	Yui Umemoto	Eri Nagata	March 6, 2021
Hanami narrowly survives Gojo's attack. Meanwhile, Mahito reveals that the attack on the competition was a diversion to distract Gojo and allow him to infiltrate Tokyo Jujutsu High. There, Mahito killed several sorcerers and stole six of Sukuna's fingers along with three special grade cursed wombs. Geto reiterates his plan to enact a major operation in Shibuya on October 31, instructing the curses to prioritize sealing Gojo while avoiding any harm to Sukuna or the students—particularly Megumi, whom Sukuna has taken an interest in. In the aftermath, Gojo resumes the exchange event, replacing the remaining battles with a friendly baseball game to give the students a break.
22	22	"The Origin of Blind Obedience"; Transliteration: "Kishu Raidō" (Japanese: 起首雷同)	Tomomi Kamiya	N/A	March 13, 2021
Megumi, Nobara, and Yuji are assigned to investigate a series of deaths linked to Megumi's former school, Saitama Urami East Junior High. They deduce that the incidents are caused by a curse and learn that Megumi's step-sister, Tsumiki—who remains in a coma—could become its next target unless the curse is exorcised. Meanwhile, Mahito and Geto advance their plans by incarnating one of the "Death Paintings", dormant half-human half-curse cursed wombs, in its full form.
23	23	"The Origin of Blind Obedience – 2 -"; Transliteration: "Kishu Raidō -Ni-" (Japanese: 起首雷同－弐－)	Directed by : Chie Nishizawa; Storyboarded by : Sunghoo Park	Terumi Nishii & Yumi Kobayashi	March 20, 2021
Two curses appear and separate Yuji and Nobara away from the school, leaving Megumi to face off against a special grade curse alone. Pushed to his limits, Megumi recalls advice from Gojo, spurring him to activate his Domain Expansion, Chimera Shadow Garden, for the first time. He successfully exorcises the curse and recovers one of Sukuna's fingers, later reflecting on his past with Tsumiki. Meanwhile, Yuji continues pursuing his opponent and eventually reunites with Nobara and hers.
24	24	"Accomplices"; Transliteration: "Kyōhan" (Japanese: 共犯)	Sunghoo Park	Takako Shimizu, Sayaka Koiso & Eri Nagata	March 27, 2021
Yuji and Nobara are infected by the cursed womb brothers' Decay technique, which threatens to rot their bodies within minutes. Nobara uses her Resonance technique to turn the tide, and together with Yuji, they exorcise the brothers—who are revealed to be the Death Paintings, confronting them with the reality of having killed humans. They find Megumi unconscious next to one of Sukuna's fingers. Upon waking, Megumi warns Yuji not to consume it, but Sukuna forcibly takes control and swallows the finger before they can stop him. Two days later, Gojo discusses the suspected traitor within Jujutsu High with Utahime and sends a large payment to fellow sorcerer Mei Mei to investigate. Todo and Mei Mei later meet with Gakuganji to recommend Yuji, Megumi, Nobara, Maki, and Panda for promotion to grade 1 sorcerer status.

== Special ==
No. overall	No. in season	Title	Original release date
13.5	SP	"New Year's Special"; Transliteration: "Shinshun Tokuban" (Japanese: 新春特番)	January 9, 2021
Voice actors Junya Enoki (Yuji Itadori) and Subaru Kimura (Aoi Todo) look back on the past thirteen episodes and recount their favorite moments from the anime series in this bonus feature airing

== Music ==
For the first 13 episodes, the opening theme song is "Kaikai Kitan" (廻廻奇譚; lit. 'Round Round Mysterious Story'), performed by Eve, while the ending theme song is "Lost in Paradise", performed by ALI featuring Aklo. For the remainder of the season, the opening theme song is "Vivid Vice", performed by Who-ya Extended, while the ending theme song is "Give It Back", performed by Cö shu Nie.

The music for the series was composed by Hiroaki Tsutsumi, Yoshimasa Terui, and Alisa Okehazama. The soundtrack was released by Toho Animation on April 21, 2021.

== Home media release ==
=== Japanese ===
Vol.	Date	Discs	Episodes
1	January 20, 2021	1	1–3
2	February 17, 2021	1	4–6
3	March 17, 2021	1	7–9
4	April 21, 2021	1	10–12
5	May 26, 2021	1	13–15
6	June 23, 2021	1	16–18
7	July 21, 2021	1	19–21
8	August 18, 2021	1	22–24

=== English ===
Part	Date	Discs	Episodes
1	February 28, 2023	2	1–12
2	October 31, 2023	2	13–24
