= Suguru Geto =

Fictional character from Jujutsu Kaisen

- Jujutsu Kaisen character
- Suguru Geto as drawn by Gege Akutami
- First appearance: Suguru Geto: Jujutsu Kaisen 0 #2, "Deeply Blackened" (2017); Kenjaku / Pseudo-Geto: Jujutsu Kaisen #10, "After the Rain" (2018)
- Created by: Gege Akutami
- Portrayed by: Nagi Murata
- Voiced by: Japanese: Takahiro Sakurai; English: Lex Lang

Suguru Geto (Japanese: 夏油 傑, Hepburn: Getō Suguru) is a fictional character and the main antagonist of Gege Akutami's manga Jujutsu Kaisen 0. Suguru Geto is a Special Grade Curse User, who was classmates and friends with Satoru Gojo. He seeks Yuta Okkotsu, the protagonist of the prequel series, for his Special Grade Curse, Rika Orimoto. Geto also appears in the main Jujutsu Kaisen series, which, through flashbacks, develops his and Gojo's complicated relationship and their eventual antagonism toward one another. In the main series, his corpse is controlled by Kenjaku (Japanese: 羂索, Hepburn: Kenjaku), a Curse User with the Cursed Technique: "Brain Transplant," which allows him to take over the bodies of others; Kenjaku uses this on Geto after his death by Gojo at the end of the prequel series. Kenjaku's goal is to evolve humanity through Cursed Energy to create a new golden age of jujutsu sorcery similar to the Heian period.

Shinobu Sensui, an antagonist from Yoshihiro Togashi's manga series YuYu Hakusho, inspired Akutami to create Geto, wanting also to explore prejudice through his character. Kenjaku was influenced by Naruto antagonist Orochimaru, with both being immortal sorcerers who use vessels to continue living. In the anime adaptations of Jujutsu Kaisen, the character is voiced by Takahiro Sakurai in Japanese and Lex Lang in English.

The character was praised by critics for his role in Jujutsu Kaisen 0, coming across as a striking villain in his fights against Yuta and his class, while also developing a deep relationship with Gojo upon the revelation of their connection. The revelation of Kenjaku controlling Geto's body in the main series resulted in mixed responses due to its effect on the narrative and Geto.

== Creation ==
Gege Akutami was inspired to create Suguru Geto after enjoying Shinobu Sensui, an antagonist from Yoshihiro Togashi's manga series YuYu Hakusho. However, he was disappointed by the result. Geto was created to explore a character who quickly prejudged others. His name was inspired by the name of the Japanese ski resort Geto Kogen. When writing his backstory, Akutami wanted to emphasize how different Geto became after leaving the Jujutsu Sorcerers and how he grew to hate common humans. One of Geto's scrolls from the series is a reference to Tite Kubo's manga series Zombiepowder.

Akutami chose Geto to befriend Satoru Gojo after researching Buddhist monk's robes and seeing the Gojo-gesa aligned with Gojo's name, thinking it would be fitting. Akutami also wanted to show the nuances with their names matching their characters: Satoru (悟, meaning "enlightenment"), the natural-born prodigy, and Suguru (傑, meaning "outstanding"), who reached prodigal levels through hard work. Furthermore, Akutami had Geto dressed as a monk in the prequel as a juxtaposition between his character creating a false religious organization while masquerading as a monk, and how monks are seen as trustworthy in the real world.

With the reveal that the original Geto dies in Jujutsu Kaisen 0 and the one from the main series is another man possessing his body, Akutami has said the body memory from one of his arms when Gojo sees him hints that the original Geto is still fighting against Kenjaku. Akutami has compared Kenjaku with Orochimaru from Masashi Kishimoto's manga series Naruto as a way to explain Geto's death. Akutami has also said Geto is powerful, believing he could have won against Yuta if he had destroyed the supernatural barrier between Shinjuku and Kyoto. Geto's strongest technique, Uzumaki, was inspired by Junji Ito's manga series with the same name. However, Akutami avoided referencing it too much as to not make it seem plagiarized.

For the Jujutsu Kaisen 0 movie, writer Hiroshi Seko commented for the movie to fit two hours of length he would need to add new material such as Yuta Okkotsu's past and the relationship between Gojo and Geto. In retrospect, Seko found all the action scenes in the second half to be exciting, including the scenes featuring Gojo, Okkotsu, Geto, and Rika. Gojo's inclusion in the narrative was meant to be natural, with focus on his relationship with Geto. The relationship is also explored in the television series. However, director Sunghoo Park claimed the staff did not want to give them too much screen time due to the narrative primarily focusing on Okkotsu and Rika. Seko said that the team expanded Okkotsu and Geto's final fight by adding a scene where the latter vomits blood.

=== Casting ===
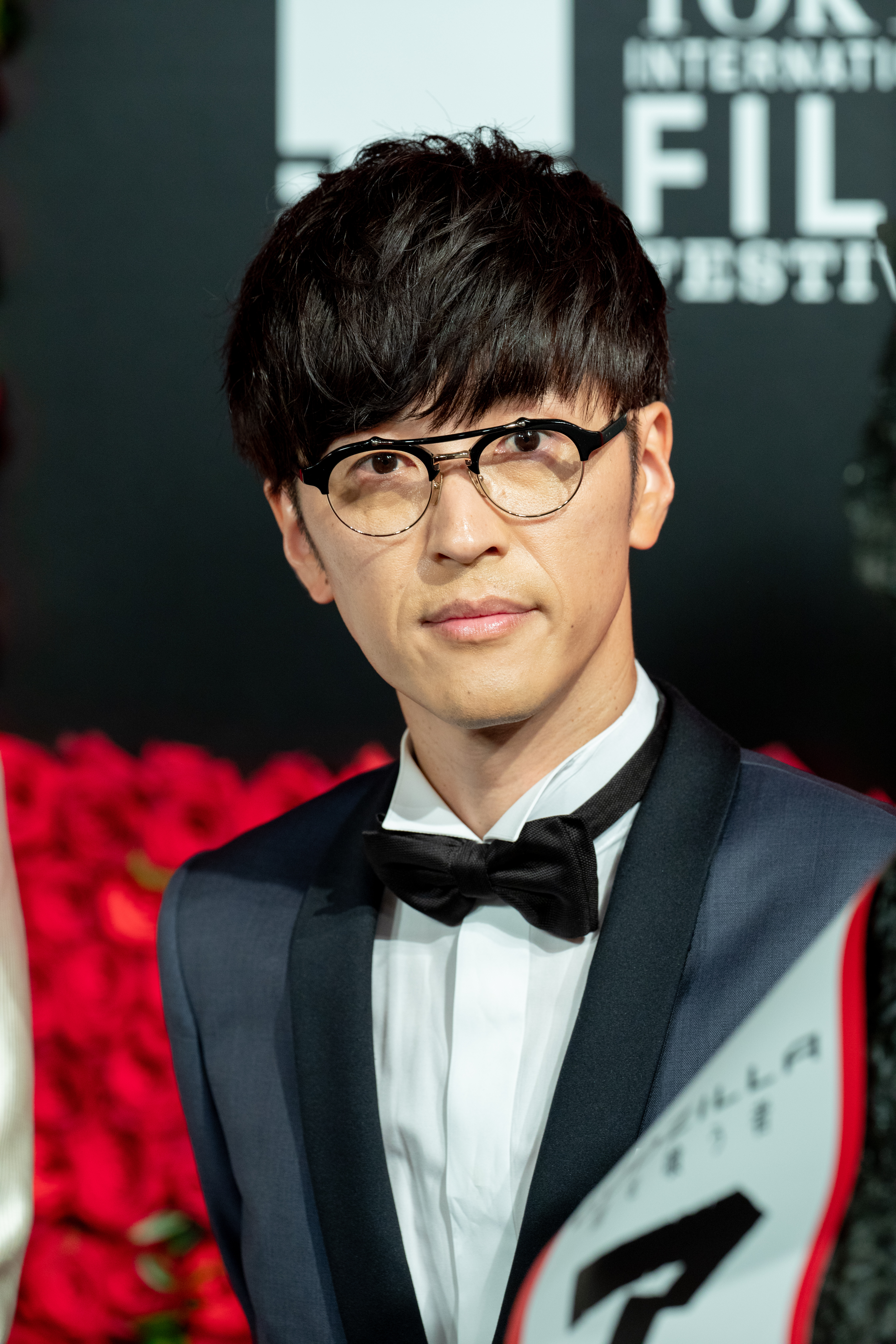
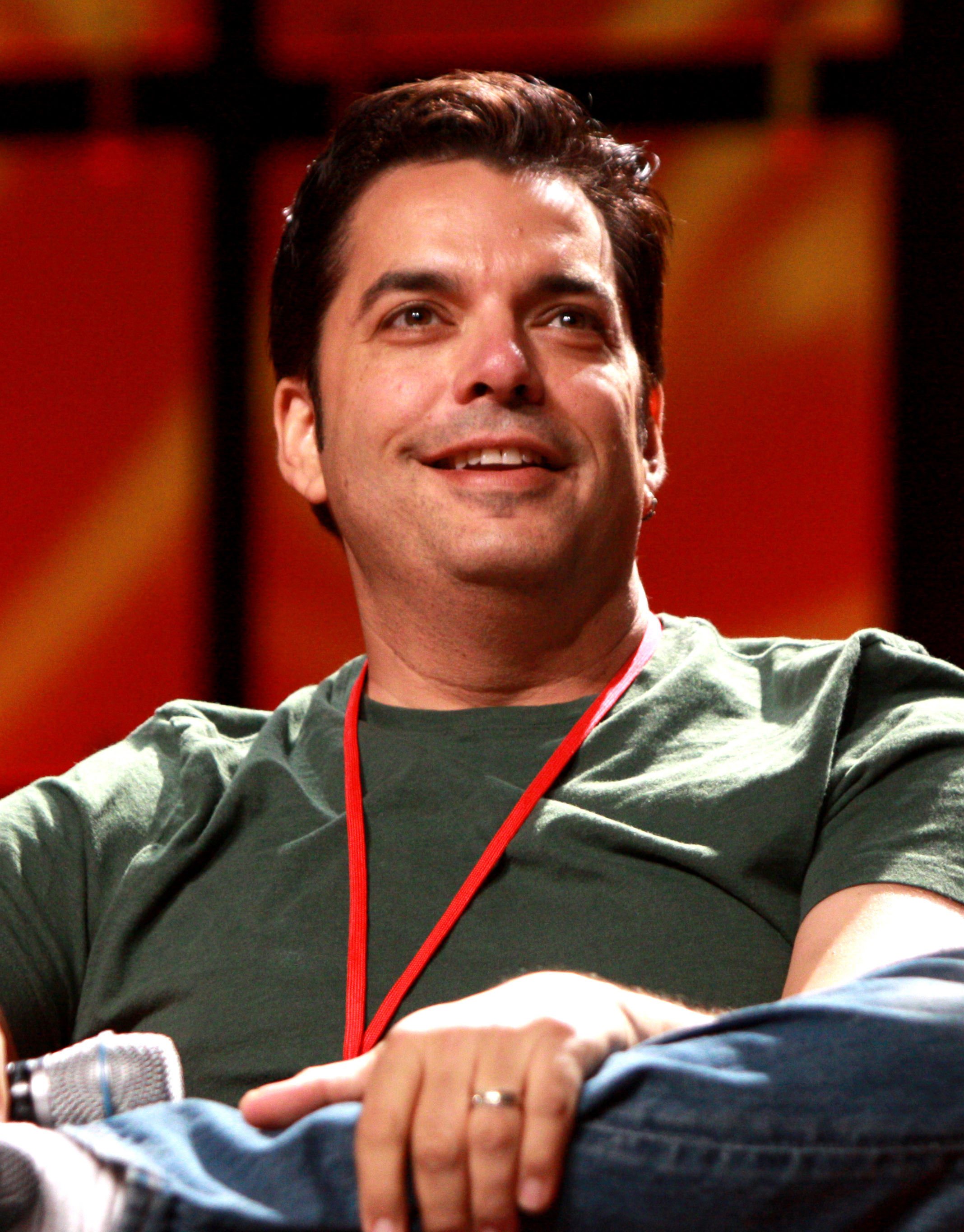
Takahiro Sakurai (left) voices Geto in Japanese, while Lex Lang voices him in English

Takahiro Sakurai, Geto's Japanese voice actor, was amazed by how cool the protagonists were. Sakurai read the original Jujutsu Kaisen 0 before recording the movie, leading him to be shocked by Kenjaku's reveal. Among numerous traits, Sakurai was surprised by the friendly relationship between Geto and Gojo. Although it was the first time Geto and Yuta interacted, Sakurai had already worked with Okkotsu's voice actress, Megumi Ogata, multiple times.

Lex Lang enjoyed Geto's characterization, despite him being the antagonist of the movie. He possesses several values which provide his character some hidden depths, Lang said. He enjoyed the mix between horror and fights in the series which surprised him during production as well as the powers he employs. Lang said the movie does a good job at exploring Geto, especially due to the flashbacks that explore his younger times as a sorcerer with Gojo.

== Appearances ==
Suguru Geto is a Special Grade Jujutsu Sorcerer, one of Masamichi Yaga's students, and a former classmate of Gojo and Shoko Ieiri. His Cursed Technique, Cursed Spirit Manipulation (呪霊 操術, Jurei Sōjutsu), allows him to absorb and control natural curses, which turn into black orbs that Geto must eat to command the cursed spirits. Introduced in the prequel series Jujutsu Kaisen 0, Geto becomes interested in the curse of the young girl Rika Orimoto. Rika is searching for protagonist Yuta Okkotsu, Gojo's student. When Gojo is not present, Geto attacks and easily defeats Yuta and his friends. However, Okkotsu, along with Rika who was now under his control, battles Geto. Geto uses his strongest technique, Maximum: Uzumaki (極ノ番「うずまき」, Gokunoban・Uzumaki), but is ultimately defeated. After losing his arm in the fight, Geto escapes and plans his revenge to acquire Rika. He is then found by Gojo, who reminds him of their past and Geto requests that Gojo shall kill him.

Jujutsu Kaisen explores Geto's past with Gojo and Jujutsu High in the Hidden Inventory / Premature Death Arc, set roughly 11 years prior to the events of Jujutsu Kaisen 0. During his time at Tokyo Prefectural Jujutsu High, Geto was an excellent student, on par with Gojo. When he and Gojo were both sophomores, they were assigned to escort the Star Plasma Vessel Riko Amanai, who was to merge with the immortal sorcerer, Tengen. When the merging was to take place, they are attacked by mercenary Toji Fushiguro, who defeats the two and kills Riko. As Gojo recovers and kills Toji, Geto begins doubting his duties as a sorcerer, and, having grown disillusioned with the duty of protecting non-sorcerers at the expense of his friends' lives, vows to break the cycle and kill every non-sorcerer to prevent the birth of more cursed spirits. He escapes from the school and massacres a village with his powers, including his own parents. Gojo confronts Geto about his crimes, but is unable to kill him and lets him go.

Although seemingly alive in the main series and planning to face Gojo again, Geto's true identity is revealed upon their meeting. Geto is in fact under the control of Kenjaku who can control his body via changing the brain. The false Geto explains his plan to use Geto's abilities to harness cursed spirits to achieve his goals, having previously possessed Noritoshi Kamo (加茂憲倫, Kamo Noritoshi). Kenjaku then uses Uzumaki to harness the abilities of one of the spirits he had previously absorbed, which was the ability to manipulate souls. He uses this ability to manipulate the souls of people he had marked throughout his past to bring sorcerers of the past as incarnates, and unleashes his cursed spirits, returning the world similar to the Heian era before escaping. In the aftermath of the Shibuya incident, Tokyo is overrun by curses. His true identity is eventually revealed to be Kenjaku, who plans to use Tengen's vulnerable state to fuse all of humanity with him. Prior to the Shibuya Incident, Kenjaku revealed the existence of cursed energy in Japan to the American government and other nations. He convinced them to use the Culling Games as an opportunity to kidnap sorcerers and curse users to use as an energy source. With the Culling Games having served its purpose, Kenjaku storms Jujutsu High to capture Tengen. Choso, and then Yuki Tsukumo are defeated by him in the process and corners the weakened Tengen. Kenjaku forcefully implements a rule to end the Culling Games upon the deaths of all the players minus him and Sukuna. Kenjaku enters the Colonies to take out the remaining Culling Games players, when he is confronted by Takaba, who is unexpectedly able to survive every one of his attacks. Kenjaku figures out the function behind his Comedian Technique, and starts to match Takaba's wits and comedy. Eventually, Kenjaku comes out on top, but the battle distracted him long enough for Yuta to catch him off guard, cutting his head off.

Geto also appears as a playable character in the fighting game Jujutsu Kaisen: Cursed Clash.

== Reception ==
=== Popularity ===
In promoting Jujutsu Kaisen 0, Uniqlo produced a series of shirts with Geto's appearance. In a Viz Media popularity poll conducted in March 2021, Geto was voted as the 12th most popular character in the Jujutsu Kaisen franchise. For the second poll, Geto's popularity rose, taking 4th place. Akutami also commented on Geto's popularity during Valentine's Day where the author noted it might be related to the release of the movie. At the 8th Crunchyroll Anime Awards, Geto was nominated for Best Supporting Character while Martial Leminoux won Best Voice Artist Performance (French) for his performance of the character.

=== Critical response ===
Critical response to Geto has been favorable. Cezary Jan Strusiewicz, in his review of the prequel movie for Polygon, said he was an entertaining villain with a "larger than life personality". Geto was compared by several critics with Marvel Comics villain Magneto due to their desire for supernaturals to rule. IGN reviewer Jemima Sebastian compared him with Gellert Grindelwald from the Harry Potter series, drawing parallels between their questionably immoral beliefs in improving mankind versus the main protagonists. She cites Geto's speech in the movie where he states he does not care about non-sorcerers while detailing his plans for his utopia. In his review for the Fandom Post, Kestrel Swift enjoyed Geto's story in the movie and was anticipating a continued look into Gojo's friendship with him, but found Geto as a villain to be not as striking as other series. Manga News also wanted a continued look into Gojo and Geto's romantic relationship. The Fandom Post writer Daniel Feathers, in his review of the English dub, thought Lex Lang's voice acting was the best in the movie.

Lauren Tidmarsh, writing for Comic Book Resources, considered Geto and Yuji Itadori as deconstructions of the hero archetype, comparing their similar reasons why they became sorcerers which was to protect others. However, both characters, she said, had different reactions to their failures, which led them to take different paths, with Yuji's friendship with Megumi Fushiguro giving him a more positive road in contrast to Geto's relative isolation. Following the anime adaptation of the flashbacks to Geto and Gojo's youth, Polygon's Ana Diaz noticed there were several fans who made dōjinshi stories with them which went viral. Both James Beckett from Anime News Network and Why Though's Charles Hartford praised the handling of their relationship and the portrayal of Geto's fall into madness.

In the climax of the Jujutsu Kaisen 0 movie, after losing to Okkotsu and escaping, Gojo appears and kills Geto. This scene confused some viewers of the movie as Geto still appears in the television series set a year after the movie. As explained in the second season of Jujutsu Kaisen, Geto's dead body was possessed by a sorcerer named Kenjaku. Geto is (to a limited extent) still alive, as his arm attacks his own possessed body during a meeting with Gojo. Real Sound writer Īchi Narimare praised the complex story involving Geto and Gojo, including the plot twist of Kenjaku controlling his corpse. Manga News had a mixed response to the twist: one writer thought it ruined Geto's character due to his backstory now being overshadowed by Kenjaku, while another writer felt it was effective as now Gojo, one of the strongest characters in the story, could possibly be defeated by this new Geto.
