= Jujutsu Kaisen Modulo =

Japanese manga series

- First tankōbon volume cover, featuring siblings Yuka (below) and Tsurugi Okkotsu (above)

呪術廻戦≡(モジュロ)
- Genre: Dark fantasy; Science fiction
- Manga
- Written by: Gege Akutami
- Illustrated by: Yūji Iwasaki
- Published by: Shueisha
- English publisher: NA: Viz Media
- Imprint: Jump Comics
- Magazine: Weekly Shōnen Jump
- Original run: September 8, 2025 – March 9, 2026
- Volumes: 3
- icon

Jujutsu Kaisen Modulo (Japanese: 呪術廻戦≡(モジュロ), Hepburn: Jujutsu Kaisen Mojuro) is a Japanese manga series written by Gege Akutami and illustrated by Yūji Iwasaki. It is a spin-off sequel to Akutami's manga series Jujutsu Kaisen. It was serialized in Shueisha's shōnen manga magazine Weekly Shōnen Jump from September 2025 to March 2026, with its chapters collected in three tankōbon volumes.

The series takes place in Tokyo, 68 years after the Culling Game events of Jujutsu Kaisen. The world has changed significantly; while the "Golden Age" of sorcery has passed, technology and Jujutsu have begun to merge. The central conflict shifts from traditional Cursed Spirits to the Simurians, an alien race that arrives on Earth possessing their own form of Cursed Energy.

== Plot ==
The story takes place in 2086, 68 years after the Culling Games event featured in Jujutsu Kaisen. An alien race known as the Simurians, with the ability to use Jujutsu Sorcery, has arrived on Earth in a spaceship, seeking a place to establish a home for their people. A Simurian representative named Marulu Val Vol Yelvori, or Maru for short, was sent to serve as a diplomat in the planet's Cursed Energy capital: Japan. For the purpose of his mission, the Japanese authorities allow Maru to partner with Jujutsu Sorcerers Tsurugi and Yuka Okkotsu—Yuta Okkotsu and Maki Zen'in's grandchildren—in order to test the ability of the Simurians to coexist with humanity.

== Production ==
Gege Akutami and manga artist Yūji Iwasaki started Jujutsu Kaisen Modulo series in Weekly Shōnen Jump on September 8, 2025. Akutami stated that the manga would run for approximately half a year and be about three volumes long, "as long as [it] is not canceled". Akutami was previously hesitant to approve Jujutsu Kaisen spin-offs due to concerns about creative misalignment. However, Akutami saw the offerings as a catalyst for expanding and exploring the world of the series with leniency and without compromising its pre-established themes. To achieve this, Akutami thought through several ideas, including expanding certain eras in the main story and refining background elements. Akutami realized that setting it in a parallel line could open the door to many different projects. This idea became the foundation for Jujutsu Kaisen Modulo, which evolved from an initial abstract idea through extensive planning during the serialization meeting.

== Publication ==
Written by Gege Akutami and illustrated by Yūji Iwasaki, Jujutsu Kaisen Modulo was serialized in Shueisha's shōnen manga magazine Weekly Shōnen Jump from September 8, 2025, to March 9, 2026. The series' individual chapters were collected into three tankōbon volumes, released from January 5 to May 1, 2026. For the release of the final volume, an animated promotional video produced by MAPPA was posted on the Jump Channel YouTube channel.

Viz Media and Shueisha (via Manga Plus) published the manga digitally in English. In June 2026, Viz Media announced that it will publish the volumes in print starting in Q2 2027.

=== Volumes ===
No.	Release date	ISBN
1	January 5, 2026	978-4-08-884832-7
1. "Special Grade Incident" (特級事案, Tokkyū Jian); 2. "Deterrence" (抑止力, Yokushiryoku); 3. "Swimming Through the Forest" (森を泳ぐ, Mori o Oyogu); 4. "The Boy Who Kept Repeating" (繰返す子供, Kurikaesu Kodomo); 5. "Senility" (老耄, Rōmō); 6. "Berserk" (暴走, Bōsō); 7. "The Robbed" (奪われた者達, Ubawareta Monotachi)
In a future Tokyo, siblings Yuka and Tsurugi Okkotsu—the grandchildren of Yuta Okkotsu and Maki Zen'in—are sent to investigate a wave of kidnappings. These disappearances happen right as the Simurians, a race of aliens claiming to be refugees, arrive on Earth in the spaceship Naunax. The aliens claim to come in peace, and one of the Simurians, named Maru, is sent to accompany the Okkotsu siblings to learn more about humanity and Earth. Yuka, Tsurugi, and Maru find out that rogue Curse Users are actually abducting children to sell on the black market as living "batteries" for Cursed Energy. During their investigation, the siblings battle a Curse User and discover that Maru is an alien. After realizing that aliens have come to Earth, they make it their mission to discover a way for Humans and Simurians to coexist, while Maru's twin brother Cross plots to promote conflict between the two groups.
2	March 4, 2026	978-4-08-884872-3
8. "Dura Val Bobbidi Mechika, Part 1" (ドゥーラ・ヴァル・ボビティ・メチカ (前編), Dūra Varu Bobiti Mechika (Zenpen)); 9. "Dura Val Bobbidi Mechika, Part 2" (ドゥーラ・ヴァル・ボビティ・メチカ (後編), Dūra Varu Bobiti Mechika (Kōhen)); 10. "Majority Vote" (賛成多数, Sansei Tasū); 11. "Cultural Exchange" (文化交流, Bunka Kōryū); 12. "Inhuman Makyo" (人外魔境, Jingai Makyō); 13. "Acceptance" (受諾, Judaku); 14. "An Older Brother's Duty" (兄として, Ani Toshite); 15. "The Forbidden Technique Unleashed" (禁術解禁, Kinjutsu Kaikin); 16. "Malicious Light" (殺意の光, Satsui no Hikari)
3	May 1, 2026	978-4-08-885042-9
17. "Chaos and Harmony" (混沌と調和, Konton to Chōwa); 18. "One Who Is Capable" (それができる者, Sore ga Dekiru Mono); 19. "Rapid Strides" (長足の進歩, Chōsoku no Shinpo); 20. "Old Soldiers Never Die" (老兵は死なず, Rōhei wa Shinazu); 21. "The Awaited One Arrives" (待ち人来る, Machibito Kitaru); 22. "Pathway of Souls" (魂の通り道, Tamashī no Tōrimichi); 23. "Ritual of Harmony" (調和の儀, Chōwa no Gi); 24. "A Ray of Hope, Or...?" (光明、或いは, Kōmyō, Aruiwa); 25. "A Bright Future" (明るい未来, Akarui Mirai)

== Reception ==
The first volume debuted first at Oricon's weekly manga ranking, with 190,432 copies sold; the second volume debuted second, with 194,752 copies sold; and the third volume debuted first with 134,102 copies sold. The first and second volumes were the sixth and seventh best-selling manga volumes in the first half of 2026, with sales of 431,979 and 398,147 copies respectively. In the rankings that Billboard Japan began compiling for 2026—which account for physical and digital sales, as well as library loans and social media popularity—the first volume appeared in several categories. It placed first on the Hot Shot Books chart, which tracks books experiencing the most significant commercial growth and rising popularity—ranking second in e-commerce, fifth in physical retail, and eighth in e-books—while also securing the tenth position on the Hot Manga chart, which ranks the best-selling manga of the year.
