= Yuta Okkotsu =

Fictional character from Jujutsu Kaisen

- Jujutsu Kaisen character
- Yuta Okkotsu as drawn by Gege Akutami
- First appearance: Jujutsu Kaisen 0 #1, "The Cursed Child" (2017)
- Created by: Gege Akutami
- Voiced by: Japanese: Megumi Ogata; English: Kayleigh McKee

In-universe information
- Occupation: Student at Tokyo Jujutsu High
- Family: Michizane Sugawara (ancestor); Satoru Gojo (distant relative)
- Nationality: Japanese

Yuta Okkotsu (Japanese: 乙骨 憂太, Hepburn: Okkotsu Yūta) is the protagonist of Gege Akutami's manga Jujutsu Kaisen 0, originally known as Tokyo Metropolitan Curse Technical School. He is a teenager who is surrounded and helped by the Cursed Spirit of Rika Orimoto, his childhood friend who died six years before the story and is cursed because both of them promised to get married when they grow up. During his teenage years, Yuta meets Satoru Gojo, a Jujutsu Sorcerer under whose guidance he joined Tokyo Metropolitan Curse Technical School to control Rika's Curse. Yuta also appears in the sequel Jujutsu Kaisen as an experienced warrior, whereas Jujutsu Kaisen Modulo is an exploration of Yuta's grandchildren with Maki Zen'in as their grandmother.

Akutami created Yuta alongside Rika before the creation of Jujutsu Kaisen 0 as a duo who work together inspired by the title character from Masashi Kishimoto's manga Naruto. He compared Yuta with the Jujutsu Kaisen protagonist Yuji Itadori, whose roles in the narratives are similar due to having to deal with inner beings with different personalities. In the animated adaptations Yuta is voiced by Megumi Ogata in the Japanese and Kayleigh McKee in the English. Ogata's role was picked by Akutami himself, finding her ideal for the part, while McKee felt pressure over her work because of her lack of experience when the film was dubbed.

Yuta was met with a positive response. Some critics found him an interesting protagonist in Jujutsu Kaisen 0 due to the curse of Rika hunting him and his growth while interacting with others. His return in Jujutsu Kaisen as a supporting character also surprised critics due to his changed traits and role in the story arcs. Ogata's and McKee's performances of Yuta also drew positive responses in the media.

== Creation ==
Yuta Okkotsu in his debut with an original hairstyle that was later revised for the main series. The scene is a reference to the anime series Neon Genesis Evangelion.

Manga author Gege Akutami said Yuta and Rika were created as "a combo" for the story before he envisioned the manga's publication. The name Okkotsu (乙骨) sounded appealing to the author while Yuta (憂太) was given for his kanji's meaning; "One With Many Friends", which the mangaka also liked. Inspired by Masashi Kishimoto's manga series Naruto, Akutami said Yuta and the Curse of Rika were influenced by the protagonist Naruto Uzumaki who lives with a nine-tailed demon fox inside his body and both would become allies when joining forces. While Yuta would also make peace with the curse of Rika who keeps torturing the character throughout Jujutsu Kaisen 0, he aimed to make a different dynamic in his next work Jujutsu Kaisen when developing the protagonist Yuji Itadori be constantly mocked and victimized by the antagonist Ryomen Sukuna.

Akutami never intended Tokyo Metropolitan Curse Technical School to be serialized as Yuta's character arc was the sole focus of this short series. As a result, when Jujutsu Kaisen was created, Akutami created a new character, Yuji, for the leading role while Yuta became supporting. Similarities between Yuta and Itadori include their introduction to jujutsu, tragedy, naivety and having faced death. Despite their similarities, the two have been noted to "carry themselves very differently ... Itadori is outgoing, where Yuta is more reserved".

Yuta and Rika remained in the same form as in the final product. The concept of the story was creating sorcerers who would be able to stop Yuta and Rika from killing others. Instead of Satoru Gojo, the character meant to recruit Yuta was Maki. Yuta's relatives were meant to be included into the story, most notably his sister who would be taken by Rika over jealousy. Although several changes were made for the official version, Akutami believes it should have kept the original concept. Yamanaka was interested by the storyboard and talked to other members from Shueisha about it. However, Akutami was stressed about expectations. In crafting the ideal protagonist, Akutami wanted Yuta to avoid being like himself. The first scene of Yuta being interrogated was influenced by the anime series Neon Genesis Evangelion which often uses a group known as SEELE that communicates with Gendo Ikari. Akutami included Michizane Sugawara, a famous figure in Japanese history, as an ancestor of Yuta and Gojo as a tribute to the former editor Yamanaka. Akutami recounts that a scene where Yuta comforts his friend Maki surprised his editor Katayama; Katayama commented that Yuta understood Maki's feelings in their interactions. Akutami revised this scene in the storyboard following his editor's praise.

In retrospect, Akutami found the early design of Yuta too similar to that of fellow Jujutsu Sorcerer Megumi Fushiguro in the main series, thinking this they might confuse readers. As a result, Akutami changed Yuta's look for the main series. For the series, Akutami teased readers with the possibility Yuta might have been romantically involved with another woman since Rika's death. Yuta's unique white uniform was made to reference problematic students, and still wears this white uniform at the end of the manga. Nevertheless, Akutami planned that once Yuta would return in Jujutsu Kaisen, he would once again wear a white uniform in hopes older readers would remember him. When Akutami's father started reading his manga, the manga author started wondering he based on Yuta on his father or Megumi's father, Toji.

Sunghoo Park, who directed the first season of the series' anime adaptation and prequel film, originally wanted to cover Yuta's story in the anime's first few episodes but later decided to against it. In the original format, Park would dedicate the series' first three episodes to develop Yuji Itadori and then replace him with Okkotsu but the idea was scrapped. Although Yuta is not present in the anime's first season, he was given a brief cameo in the second introduction sequence, which was created months before the studio MAPPA confirmed the production of the Jujutsu Kaisen 0 film.

Park said that while Yuta and Rika are the main focus of the film, he still wanted to explore more on his relationship with the supporting cast. Sunghoo Park cast Yuta's voice actor; Ogata's job surprised them because Yuta is a young male being voiced by a woman. In regards to the film's theme song King Gnu's "Ichizu" (一途; "The Only Way"), the lyrics places focus on the relationship between Yuta and Rika. Following the film's release, Park's favorite fight sequence is when Yuta calls Rika to Geto in terms of animation.

=== Casting ===
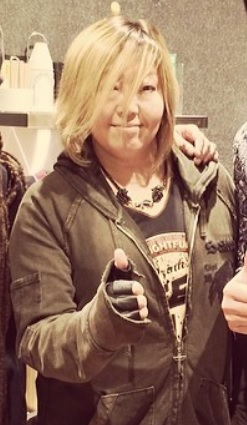
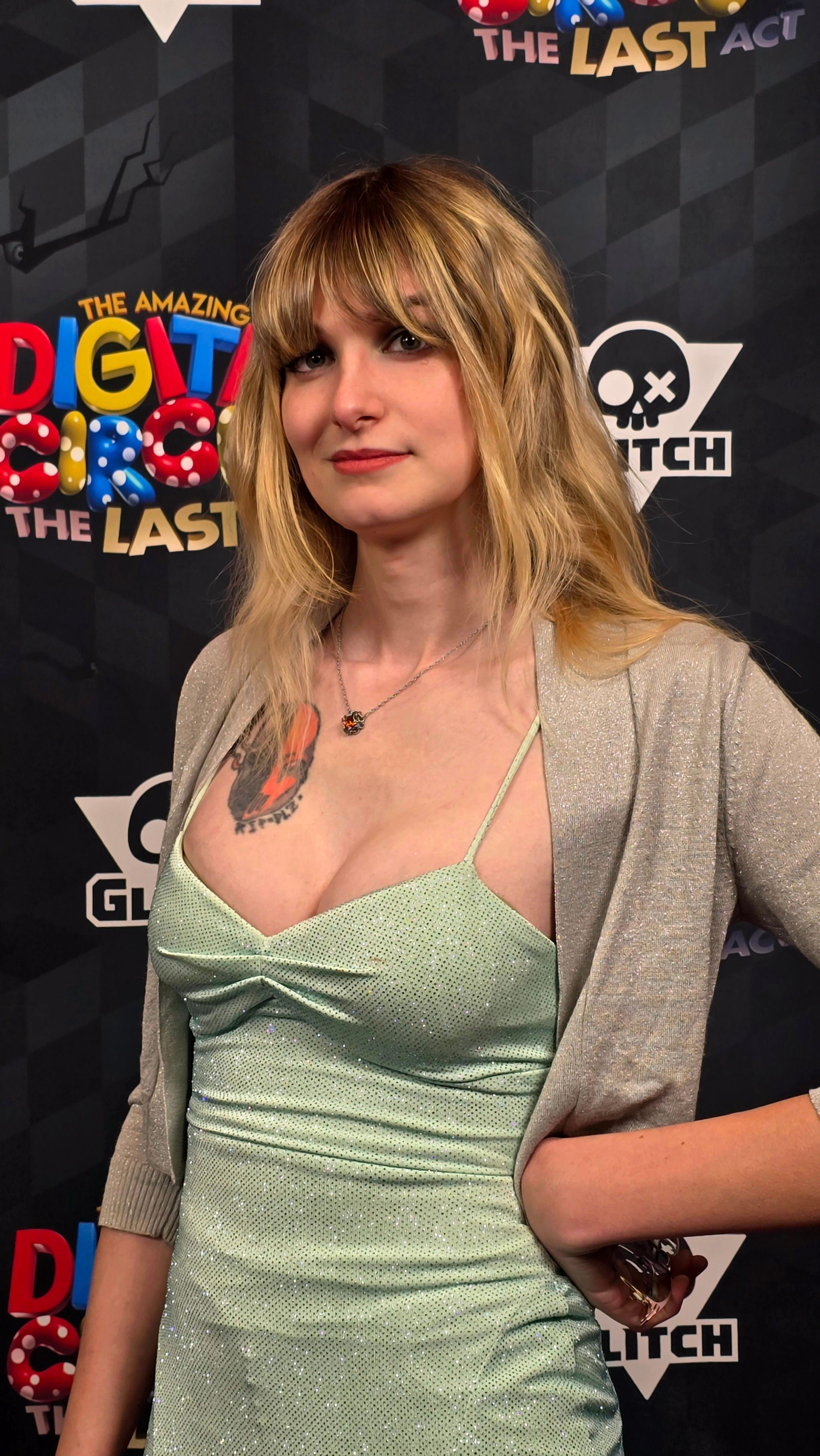
Megumi Ogata (left) and Kayleigh McKee (right) who voice Yuta in Japanese and English, respectively.

Gege Akutami cast Megumi Ogata as Yuta's Japanese voice, following Park's advice and other staff members. The manga author claimed that the voice he envisioned was "neutral, soft, and kind, and there is also a big emotional swing and head". Ogata further said Yuta is one of the most relatable characters she has ever found due to the parallels she found when comparing his lonely childhood with hers and how both became sociable people. Additionally, she also found Yuta relatable because he continues suffering pain and overcomes his internal struggles.

Ogata had to interact with the director Park to get a better understanding of Yuta as a character. When the film premiered, Ogata said she was satisfied with her work and looked forward to future projects. Fellow voice actors Yuichi Nakamura and Takahiro Sakurai felt that the feeling of "synchronization" is great in regards to Ogata's performance as Yuta. When asked about Ogata, Hanazawa commented through her work; she managed to feel Yuta's love through her partner's work, making the character loveable. In response to that, Ogata praised Hanazawa's work as Rika. In retrospect, Ogata said voicing Yuta was a difficult work due to social distancing protocols. Upon returning to voice Yuta in the film Execution, Ogata noticed that even though it was to fake Itadori's death, he still had to stop his heart, so it was Yuta's turn to calmly think about how to kill him. He had a monologue saying, "He's fast," and Ogata thought he was fighting while analyzing his opponent, so he was trying to figure out Itadori's fighting style and looking for an opening. She noticed that several of the characters used in Jujutsu Kaisen have a tendency to monologue their fighting strategy and Yuta became one.

In the English dub, Yuta is voiced by Kayleigh McKee. McKee expressed satisfaction over being selected for Yuta's voice, calling the work "amazing, challenging, and so fun". McKee related to Yuta's lonely life and eventual growth, which helped her find the pitch required to voice the character. She also found Yuta's story similar to a coming-of-age story due to his need to learn to control Rika while making friends. McKee, who was new to voice work, had fun doing fight scenes because her character makes several types of sounds, especially because of Yuta's troubling experiences. McKee found the moments where Yuta calms down and makes touch with Rika as the most important for her because they show how kind he can be. Yuta's leading role in the film made McKee nervous because she never had such a big role in her career. Satisfied with her role, McKee considered Yuta to have become more mature.

In a stage play that tells the story of Jujutsu Kaisen 0, Yuta was portrayed by Yuki Ogoe. According to AmeBlo, Yuta was a more fitting role for Ogoe than his previous work Kurapika from Hunter × Hunter due to their different haircolor and school uniform, fitting for Akutami's opinion of how Yuta should be portrayed.

== Appearances ==
=== Jujutsu Kaisen 0 ===
Yuta Okkotsu is the protagonist of Tokyo Metropolitan Curse Technical School, retitled Jujutsu Kaisen 0; initially, he is a cursed victim of Special-Grade who is haunted by the spirit of his childhood friend Rika Orimoto. Satoru Gojo takes charge of Yuta's case and enrolls him at Tokyo Prefectural Jujutsu High School, where he befriends Panda, Maki Zen'in and Toge Inumaki. In his first mission, a wounded Maki motivates Yuta to fight to achieve his goals, allowing him to briefly control Rika and swearing to stop the Curse in the process. After months training with Gojo and the other students, Yuta learns to control his Cursed Energy and becomes a skilled swordsman, often sparring with Maki and Panda. The power of Rika attracts Suguru Geto, a sorcerer who was friends with Gojo. Geto attacks Yuta and his friends, severely wounding them.

Enraged by Geto's actions, Yuta unleashes Rika's curse, promising to join her if she helps him to defeat Geto. Yuta overwhelms Geto, who escapes after losing an arm in combat. As Gojo kills the escapees, it is revealed Rika did not curse Yuta, but after her death, Yuta's desire to make her survive resulted in him accidentally turning her into a Curse Spirit. Now familiar with his powers, Yuta frees Rika, and she departs to the afterlife with Yuta remaining as a sorcerer.

In December 2021, Akutami wrote a new chapter based on Jujutsu Kaisen 0. After Rika's passing, Yuta's group has part-time jobs in a store, where Utahime Iori is a customer. The animated film adds an extra scene where Yuta befriends one of Geto's former allies as they have lunch in Kenya until being interrupted by Gojo.

=== Jujutsu Kaisen ===
Yuta does not appear in the early chapters of Jujutsu Kaisen, but Gojo mentions him as one of the upper-level students attending Jujutsu High who may one day surpass him when discussing students with Yuji Itadori. Upon his return to Japan, Yuta saves a child from a spirit surrounded by a replica he calls Rika. Yuta returns to Jujutsu High as an executioner of Yuji for possessing a vengeful spirit called Ryomen Sukuna, also avenging his friend Inumaki who had been wounded by Sukuna. Yuta finds Yuji and his ally Choso fighting one of Maki's relatives, Naoya Zen'in. Yuta easily defeats Yuji and Choso and pretends to kill the former. After telling Naoya to inform their superiors that Yuji is dead, Yuta reveals himself as an ally to the recently revived Yuji.

Yuta then reunites with the other sorcerers to help Gojo. The group joins forces to defeat Kenjaku who aims to curse Japanese civilians through his Culling Game terrorist attack. Yuta enters the Sendai colony of the Culling Games and successfully defeats multiple reincarnated sorcerers. When Gojo is freed, Yuta and his allies are forced to see their mentor fight the free Sukuna. After Gojo's death, Yuta decapitates Kenjaku after his battle with Takaba. He then joins Yuji's fight against Sukuna who is using Megumi Fushiguro as a new vessel. Yuta uses the Authentic Mutual Love (真相相愛, Shingan Sōai) Domain Expansion which carries all copied attacks. Teaming up together, Yuta and Yuji attempt to release Megumi, but the rejection from their ally results in Sukuna giving them severe wounds. Nevertheless, Yuta uses Kenjaku's cursed technique, the body swapping technique to switch bodies with the dead Gojo. Yuta rejoins the fight against Sukuna as he attempts to control his mentor's powers, yet the effort is in vain. While he is unable to defeat Sukuna and his copy reaches his limit, Yuji, using his newly unlocked domain, frees Megumi from Sukuna. Afterwards, Rika returns Yuta to his original body and reunites with his partners. In the epilogue, Yuta is the head representative of the Gojo clan and has children and grandchildren.

=== Jujutsu Kaisen Modulo ===
In the experimental sci-fi spin-off manga Jujutsu Kaisen Modulo, Yuta marries Maki sometime after the Shinjuku showdown. As an old man, Yuta promises his grandchild Yuka his cursed ring. However, the Gojo clan instead passed it to their grandson Tsurugi, claiming he needed it more due to his "weakness". Tsurugi wishes to take this burden off of his hands and prove himself. Both Yuka and Tsurugi, while facing their own problems, aspire to become like the grandparent who respectively influenced them.

=== Jujutsu Kaisen: Cursed Clash ===
Yuta also appears a playable character in the fighting game Jujutsu Kaisen: Cursed Clash in his Jujutsu Kaisen 0 design and in the mobile game Jujutsu Kaisen: Phantom Parade in his Jujutsu Kaisen 0 design & his Culling Games design.

== Reception ==
=== Popularity ===
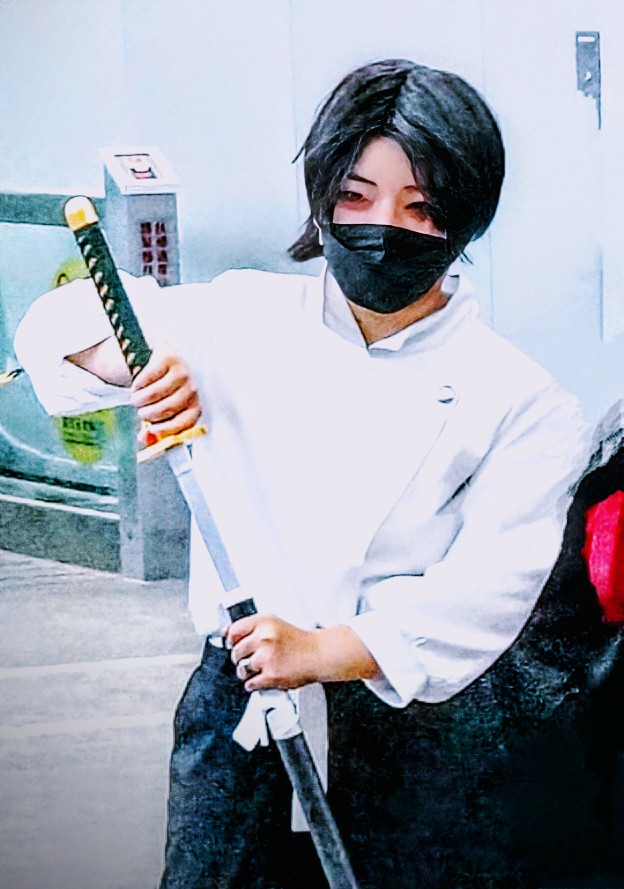
A Yuta Okkotsu cosplayer

In a Viz Media popularity poll conducted in March 2021, Yuta was voted as the eighth-most-popular character in the Jujutsu Kaisen franchise. In another poll conducted in December 2021 by Weekly Shōnen Jump, he was voted the eighth most popular character once again. To promote the series, Yuta's outfit was added to the NetEase video game Knives Out, and a figurine of Yuta holding Rika was released by Shibuya Scramble Figure. A replica of Yuta's sword featuring the shadows of his energy was also produced. According to EpicStream, Yuta's Expansion Domain against Sukuna was became hot topic when revealed in the manga in February 2024; It was nicknamed by the fandom as "Unlimited Blade Works" due to its similarities with a dimension from the visual novel Fate/stay Night in which the protagonist Shirou Emiya and his future persona Archer due how the characters draw a large amount of swords when preparing to fight with all their might.

Following the release of the Jujutsu Kaisen 0 film, /Film listed the character as its third best character behind Rika and Panda. In May 2022, manga artist Kenta Shinohara did his own tribute to the character of Yuta alongside Yuji and Megumi. In the Anime Trending 2022 poll, Yuta was voted as one of the best film characters, ranking eighth in the general Boy of the Year category. He was also second in the Best Male Character award from Animage's 2022 Anime Grand Prix poll behind Tengen Uzui from Demon Slayer: Kimetsu no Yaiba. In the Newtype Anime Awards, Yuta was also popular reaching sixth place in the Best Male Character category for his role in the film. In 2023, Jaime Pérez de Sevilla and Nicolás Artajo were awarded the best Spanish and German, respectively, voice actors from the 7th Crunchyroll Anime Awards for their portrayal of Yuta. Pedro Alcântara was also a nominee in regards to Portuguese voice acting. Yuta's appearance in the finale of the anime's second season was praised by the fans according to The Television to the point he became a hot topic in social media. Praise was given specifically to his redesign, looking far stronger and having scenes with appealing animation. McKee posted in January 2024 in social media an "apology form" towards Yuta due to multiple negative responses by the fandom and wanted they to sign more of them. A Jujutsu Kaisen 0-themed cafe event ran in Tokyo, Osaka, and Nagoya from August 29 to October 27, 2024.

=== Critical response ===
Critics often praised Yuta's role in Jujutsu Kaisen 0. Several writers enjoyed the handling of his story arc as well as his relationship with his classmates. Daryl Harding for Yatta-Tachi and Bleeding Cool found him an appealing character from the shōnen manga demography. Anime News Network criticized Yuta's traits as a common trend in contrast due to his early growth. In regards to his powers, Los Angeles Times compared the pairing of Yuta and Rika with that of the Marvel Comics character Venom because of the way Yuta has to control Rika's power in order to properly fight. While criticized due to the power granted by Rika, The Digital Fix noted there are multiple differences between the two leads, finding Yuta’s origin darker than Yuji’s. Critics also praised Yuta's fight scenes in the film, which were deemed superior to most of MAPPA's past works such as The God of High School with Polygon finding him comparable to the superhero Batman based on how energetic he becomes. In a retrospect review of the entire Jujutsu Kaisen manga series, Kevin Cormack of Anime News Network praised the handling of Yuta's character arc and the emotional stakes it presented.

Yuta's eventual return to Jujutsu Kaisen surprised critics due to the irony in the former protagonist's role of killing the current one,. While considered surprisingly different from how he had acted previously, Stephen Shin, from Anime News Network, felt Yuta's change of persona was well written. James Beckett from Anime News Network looked forward to Yuta's role in the main series. Anime Hunch claimed that the entire fandom was relieved when Yuta was revealed to be acting on Gojo's request to fake Yuji's death. Yuta's subsequent inclusion in the Culling Games, especially in the "Sendai Colony" episode from the third season's final received critical acclaim for his multiple fight choreographies as well as MAPPA's production values by writers from Polygon, ScreenRant and Anime News Network. Nijimen found Yuta's and Yuji's team-up against Sukuna to be engaging as a result of the two being the protagonists of the two manga written by Akutami, but was worried Sukuna might kill them if it kept on going especially after the previous deaths in the manga. Despite praising the character's role in the Culling Games, Kevin Cormack criticized how little screentime Akutami gave Yuta in the final arc. Once the series ended, GameRant noted that Yuji was not a fitting main character as both Yuta and Gojo overshadowed him, especially with Yuta's more notorious character arc. With the epilogue's release in the final volume, GameRant noted fans were satisfied as it appeared probable that Yuta ended forming a family with Maki, an outcome some fans were looking forward to for a long time.

There was also commentary about Yuta's voice actors in the Jujutsu Kaisen 0 film. Some media praised Megumi Ogata's Japanese portrayal of Yuta for making the character stand out as unique in the film, in which when he changes from being calm, which was compared to her early deliveries as Shinji Ikari from Neon Genesis Evangelion, too aggressive, when there are elements of horror and action. Anime News Network and IGN also praised Yuta's relationship with Rika for giving him a less predictable characterization. The Fandom Post compared Kayleigh McKee's voice work with that of Spike Spencer, who voiced Shinji in the English dub of the series, and wondered whether it was intentional. HITC equally praised McKee and Ogata for making Yuta more appealing alongside Rika. Pop Culture Maniacs was more negative about McKee's work for making him sound childish rather than traumatized. Ogata's performance in the season 2 finale was praised by Real Sound for giving him several aura at the same time, citing his caring treatment towards a young girl and the cold attitude when telling his superior he would kill Yuji Itadori.

=== Analysis ===
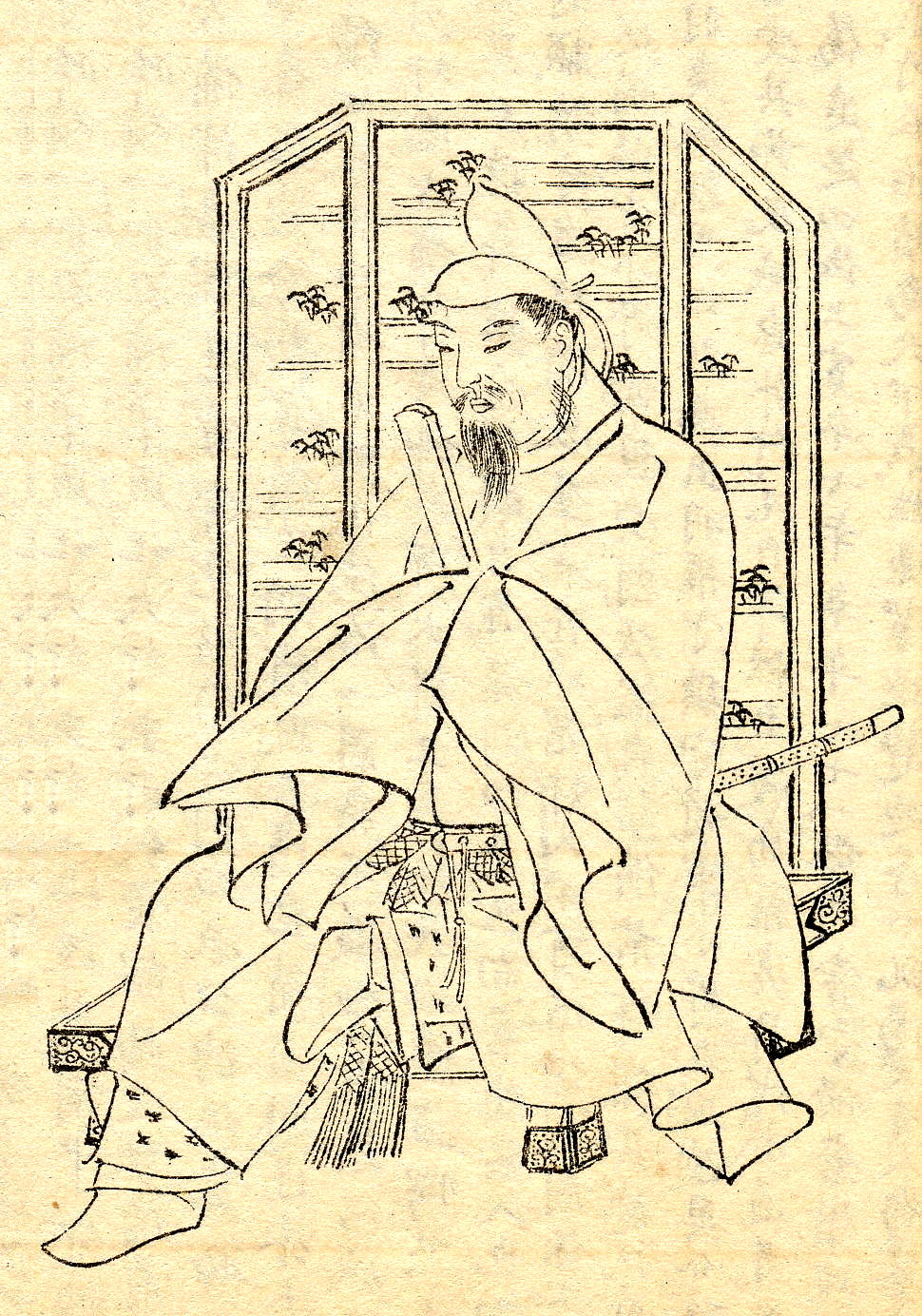
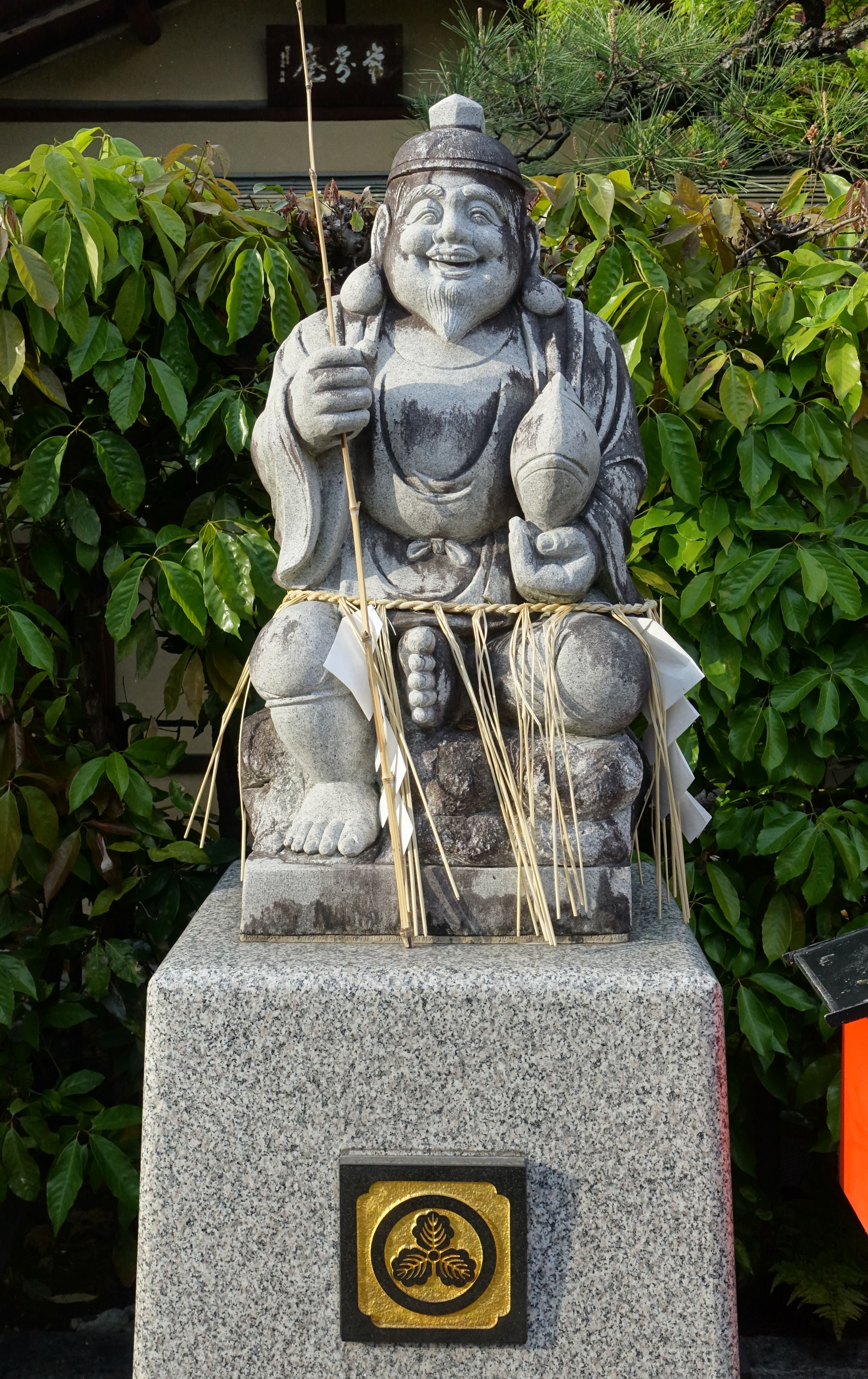
Besides Sugawara no Michizane's (left) link with Yuta Okkotsu, the character was also compared by myths of Ebisu.

According to the website Real Sound, Yuta is the main focus of Jujutsu Kaisen 0, whose narrative primarily focuses on his growth since Rika's death. Similarly, Polygon said the narrative's theme is Yuta's need to accept the death of Rika. Meanwhile, Anime News Network saw Yuta as an emotionally ambiguous character because of the way he deals with his feelings for Rika after her death. Park considers Yuta to be a straightforward teenager whose loneliness is caused by being chased by Rika's curse. While making the film, Megumi Ogata surprised Park by giving Yuta a sensitive characterization. The actress describes Yuta as an attractive character because he becomes stronger when interacting with others. Komatsu noted while at first Yuta appears to be weak, Ogata's performance helps give the character a stronger impression. Rika's curse is also considered the idea of how Yuta can use a major power for a great good.

The film expands upon Yuta's personal weaknesses, which are a result of an illness and his rejection of his surroundings. Yuta realizes he and his peers are both accepted through their interactions with one another. Yuta's reluctance to accept Rika's death parallels Yuji Itadori's need to accept his grandfather's death. In the series' beginning, Yuta finds salvation in Satoru Gojo, who guides him in controlling Rika in Jujutsu High and avoiding isolation. The Mary Sue said Yuta's growth makes him appealing because he stops wanting to kill himself and starts appreciating his life. Yuta's hero's journey advances through his physical growth, as Maki training him to stand alone allows his change into a hero. Despite his early passivity, Yuta shows a more aggressive personality when his friends are wounded by Suguru Geto, especially when the scene is animated. Fighting Geto and confronting Rika's curse allows Yuta to accept death and recover from the trauma of losing her. McKee was moved by Yuta's motivational speech about being cherished by his classmates and noted a major change of expression towards the climax in his fight against Geto. Cultture agreed with McKee in regards to how Yuta is portrayed as a more composed teenager who in one year when compared with his original persona. He is noted to keep trust in his mentor Gojo. Additionally, Yuta is noted to share close connections with his former partners, mostly Maki, despite his absence. However, Cultture noted that there was no romance between them despite the tease made by Panda and Akutami himself.

In "Analysis of the Visual Meaning of the Jujutsu Kaisen 0 Film Poster", Citra Agustina from the Institut Teknologi Batam addresses the portrayal of Yuta in the film's poster due to its handling of a sword with a tense expression with cursed energy and how he is accompanied by Rika. Despite the state of Rika, there is emphasis on how both fight together as highlighted by the illustration. The poster also features other Jujutsu High students who symbolize that Yuta is not alone. In Jungian Dimensions of the Mourning Process, Burial Rituals and Access to the Land of the Dead: Intimations of Immortality, the writer Hiroko Sakata addressed similarities Yuta and Rika with the God Hiruko, the Oni Katako and the child K, citing the Yuta's and Rika's stories as modernized versions of Japanese myths, comparing them with Tanjiro Kamado and Nezuko Kamado from the manga Demon Slayer: Kimetsu no Yaiba as both aim to control the Oni element present in the narrative and become fighters in the process.

=== Awards and nominations ===
| Year | Award | Category | Recipient | Result | Ref. |
|---|---|---|---|---|---|
| 2022 | 44th Anime Grand Prix | Best Male Character | Yuta Okkotsu | 2nd place | |
| 2022 | 12th Newtype Anime Awards | Best Male Character | Yuta Okkotsu | 5th place | |
| 2023 | 7th Crunchyroll Anime Awards | Best Voice Artist Performance (Castilian) | Jaime Pérez de Sevilla as Yuta Okkotsu | Won | |
| 2023 | 7th Crunchyroll Anime Awards | Best Voice Artist Performance (German) | Nicolás Artajo as Yuta Okkotsu | Won | |
| 2023 | 7th Crunchyroll Anime Awards | Best Voice Artist Performance (Portuguese) | Pedro Alcântara as Yuta Okkotsu | Nominated | |
