= Maki Zen'in =

Fictional character from Jujutsu Kaisen

Maki Zenin
- Jujutsu Kaisen character
- Maki Zenin as drawn by Gege Akutami
- First appearance: Jujutsu Kaisen 0 #1, "The Cursed Child" (2017)
- Created by: Gege Akutami
- Voiced by: Japanese: Mikako Komatsu; English: Allegra Clark

In-universe information
- Occupation: Student at Tokyo Jujutsu High
- Family: Naobito Zenin (uncle); Naoya Zenin (cousin); Toji Fushiguro (cousin); Jinichi Zenin (cousin); Ogi Zenin (father); Megumi Fushiguro (first cousin once removed); Mai Zenin (younger twin sister)
- Nationality: Japanese

Maki Zenin (Japanese: 禪院 真希, Hepburn: Zenin Maki) is a fictional character from Gege Akutami's manga Jujutsu Kaisen 0, originally known as Tokyo Metropolitan Curse Technical School. She is a young student from Jujutsu High, mentored by Satoru Gojo. Maki becomes classmate of newcomer Yuta Okkotsu, who is trying to control the violent cursed spirit Rika Orimoto. The manga mentions Maki's origins as a reject from the Zenin clan, which is further explored in the main series Jujutsu Kaisen, where she is one year older and deals with several enemies.

Akutami created Maki as a character whose origins would be further explored in the series future, with her fighting style being a mix of several fighting styles combined into one. She is voiced by Mikako Komatsu in Japanese and Allegra Clark in English. Critical response to Maki's character has been positive in both Jujutsu Kaisen and the prequel for her striking personality and fighting skills, with the latter often noted to be strange to see in series aimed towards a female demography.

== Creation ==
Though Maki was better known in Jujutsu Kaisen, manga author Gege Akutami recommended main series readers to check the prequel Jujutsu Kaisen 0 for a better understanding of her life. Her hair's length is something Akutami tends to change whenever he likes. Akutami also enjoys writing how Maki is shown to particularly strong physically in early in the series due to how she destroys a weapon using brute force. Akutami enjoyed writing a scene in which Yuta tells Maki he would like to be like her in the third chapter, and possibly help take care of the Zen'in, which causes Maki to leave, chiding herself upon even thinking she's been accepted and mildly blushing in spite of herself. Upon seeing the first draft of scene, Akutami's editor Katayama said Yuta really seemed to understand Maki, leading Akutami, flattered by the praise, to revise and expand on later panels in the storyboard to further display Yuta's empathy as a whole.

Both the original mini-series and the main Jujutsu Kaisen manga early explore issues Maki has with other members from Zen'in clan to the point her weaponry is surprising but is related to the mentor Satoru Gojo. Akutami claimed in the thirteen volume that he planned to explore more focus more on the Zen'in clan problems. Her design went from normal glasses to black-frames, but only for the fight against Suguru Geto. When asked by why Maki often refers to Todo by his surname, Akutami mentioned it is a tendency of her to call others by their first name unless the others call her by her last name. As a result, he mentions any contradictions when dealing with others might come across as plot holes. Originally, Maki uses a weapon to compensate for her lack of spells. Akutami claimed in the series' fanbook that a major theme in the manga is Maki becoming a stronger Jujutsu sorcerer, which is meant to be the focus on future installments. Maki's fighting style was based on both aikido and a mix of Chinese martial arts.

=== Casting ===
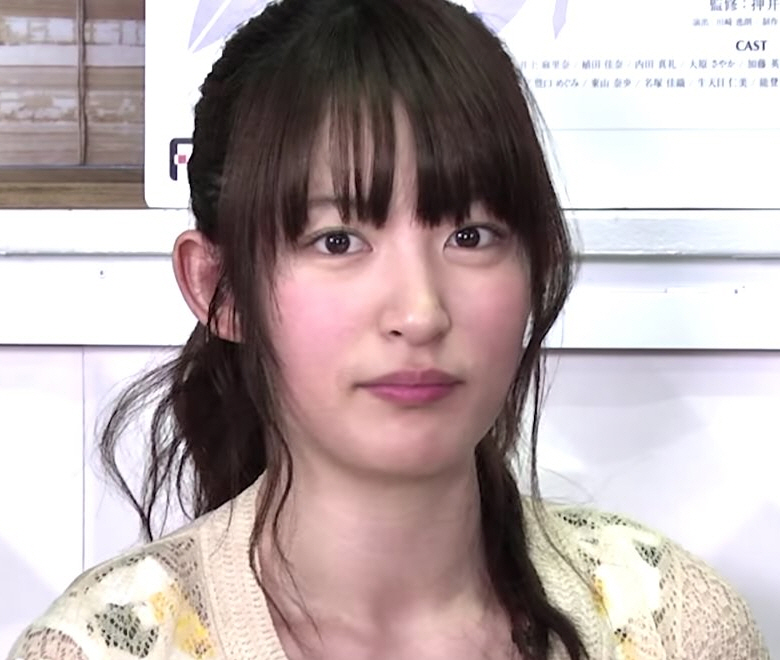
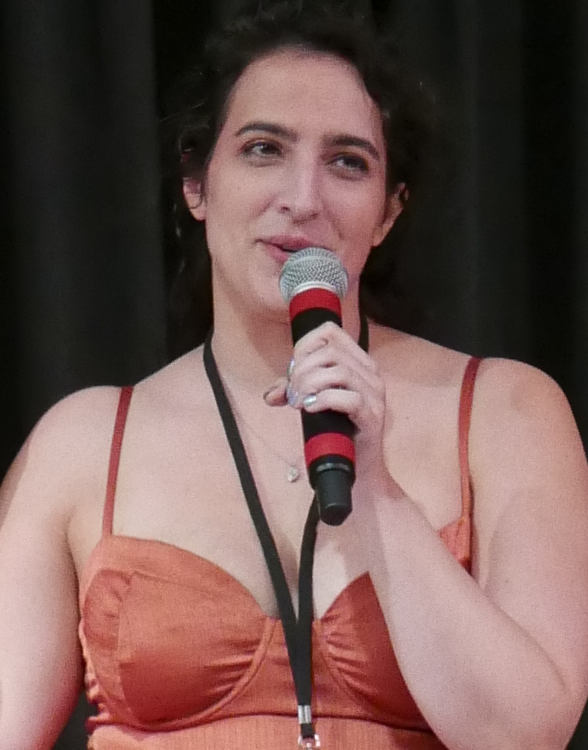
Mikako Komatsu (left) and Allegra Clark (right) who voice Maki in Japanese and English, respectively.

Mikako Komatsu voices Maki who noted the dynamic between her character, Panda and Toge Inumaki provided interesting comedy in both the television series and the movie prequel with Maki often being loud. Originally she was grown up and had an aggressive part, but was conscious that this work felt younger and had more momentum in the reaction to what was said and what happened than in the TV series. Komatsu felt that the movie helped to explore her character's weakness, especially when talking with the shyer Yuta Okkotsu about her past. Komatsu finds that Maki becomes more likable when interacting with Yuta despite her initial comments about how she perceives the young man. However, she considers this interaction to be to different from her role in the television series where her work with the protagonist Yuji Itadori, who had little to no knowledge about spells. Komatsu also liked working in the movie for her action scenes and her meeting with Megumi Ogata, Yuta's actor, due to her performance.

Allegra Clark voices Maki in the English dub who sees her character's most notable traits are both "vulnerable" and "angry". However, Clark claims that thanks to the handling of these, Maki is enjoyable to play especially with her goals. She noticed about a major contrast between the television series and the movie in regards to how she talks to Nobara and Yuta respectively on her desires; In the television series, she claims to simply want to grow stronger, while in the movie she openly angrier towards her clan, wishing to actively climb up the ranks and become the head one day, just to spite them, this serving as her motivation to become stronger. Across the film, she is shown to become slightly more assured in herself over time. Satisfied with her role in the movie, Clark made research into the manga and wanted to keep playing Maki due to her further screentime that the anime has yet to explore.

== Appearances ==
=== Jujutsu Kaisen 0 ===
Maki Zen'in debuts in Jujutsu Kaisen 0 as a young student from Jujutsu High mentored by Satoru Gojo who brings a nervous teenager, Yuta Okkotsu, in order to train him and stop the curse of the undead girl Rika who is attacking everybody chasing Yuta. Early Maki mocks Yuta's weakness for being too passive, believing him to be the often subject of bullying. Although Yuta is unable to fight, he is assigned to work with Maki in exorcising a curse. When Maki is wounded, she asks Yuta what is his real desire to which he responds is that he only wants to enjoy a good life rather than remain alone. Maki encourages him to fight and get friends, allowing Yuta to control Rika for a brief period of time to escape with her. In the next three months, Maki has become Yuta's mentor in swordplay so that he can also fight alone much to her comrade's surprise. When one of Satoru Gojo's friends, Suguru Geto, appears in Jujutsu High, it is revealed that Maki is a rejected member from the Zen'in clan and is mocked. Geto's generally condescending behavior angers Yuta immensely and he asks him to leave. After the visit, Maki tells Yuta of her aspirations to become the Zen'in clan head, and the limitations they placed upon her. In an attempt to comfort her, Yuta jokes of fighting when they face the clan again. Geto once again appears in Jujutsu High to take Rika's Curse, taking down all the students. Yuta takes control of Rika to save his classmates, resulting in Geto escaping weakened.

=== Jujutsu Kaisen ===
In Jujutsu Kaisen, Maki appears one year older still as Sorcerer from Jujutsu High alongside Panda and Toge Inumaki as Yuta is working abroad. During an examination where the Kyoto students try to kill newcomer Yuji Itadori for possessing the vengeful spirit of Ryomen Sukuna, Maki joins Yuji's group and defeats her sister, Mai, who questions why she left their clan. During the Shibuya incident, Maki suffers severe burns from the cursed spirit Jogo, leaving her body scarred. After the incident, Maki still continues to fight alongside Yuta and the other Jujutsu High students against Geto's predecessor Kenjaku. After Mai sacrifices her life for Maki, she is able to see curses without glasses. After killing their father, she slaughters Naoya Zen'in and all members of the Zen'in clan in retribution for the pain she and Mai were forced to undergo during their childhood.

She joins the Culling Games as a player, and due to her special circumstance, is able to leave and enter barriers. Noritoshi Kamo from Kyoto school soon joins her side in the colony, but they are set upon by the special grade cursed spirit created from Naoya Zen'in, who has arrived as a curse to avenge his own death at the hands of Maki and her mother. They engage in fierce battle, during which Maki is significantly injured. She is forced to retreat, in order to heal, as Noritoshi takes it upon himself to hold off Naoya until she can exorcise it, even if it costs his life. During her battle with Naoya's cursed spirit, she is fully awakened, becoming just like Toji Fushiguro.

During the Shinjuku Showdown, Maki observes the fight between Gojo and Sukuna with the rest of the crew via Mei Mei's broadcast. Once Gojo is killed, the backup plan is sprung into action with fighters going in against Sukuna. Upon entering combat, Maki stands by awaiting for the signal to attack Sukuna. Once the signal arrives, she pierces Sukuna through the heart with the Split Soul Katana and begins battle. She battles fiercely, even taking a direct black flash from Sukuna and cutting off his arm, but a second black flash puts her out of commission. Her efforts allow Yuji to free Megumi from Sukuna's grasp in the end.

=== Jujutsu Kaisen Modulo ===
In this experimental spin-off, Maki marries Yuta, and together they have a son named Iori Okkotsu, the father of Tsurugi Okkotsu and Yuka Okkotsu. While Yuta was close to Yuka, Maki was close to Tsurugi and became his mentor before succumbing to the grief of Iori's disappearance, leading to her untimely death in 2079 at the age of 77, and Yuta to die of grief a year later at 79.

== Reception ==
=== Popularity ===
In a Viz Media popularity poll in March 2021, Maki was voted as the 11th most-popular character in the Jujutsu Kaisen franchise. Mikako Komatsu won the "Best Actress in Supporting Role" for her work as Maki Zen'in in the 16th Seiyu Awards. At the 7th Crunchyroll Anime Awards, Elisa Giorgio won Best Voice Artist Performance (Italian) for her performance of the character.

=== Critical response ===
Critical response to Maki's character in the main series was positive during the Kyoto training arc between the Jujutsu students. When the character was about to show her skills for the first time, Anime News Network was tired of the several fights the arc had and hoped Maki would stand out in the narrative. The eventual battle between the Zen'in sisters earned praise for both the animation and exploration from Maki's past. The Fandom Post called Maki "the star of the show" due to how she overshadows her enemies and keeps a cocky personality, surpassing Nobara's character. Comic Book Resources claimed that Maki and Nobara "crush" society expectations also focusing on the handling of the sisters, leaving a bittersweet moment due to sadness the episode leaves as the family feuds from the Zen'in clan was not properly explained. Anime News Network enjoyed both the fighting choreography as it was more enjoyable than Yuji's battle among others. The site also found how "groundbreaking" the scene where Maki defeats Momo was. The eventual focus on Maki's actions in the series led Comic Book Resources to point out that the Zen'in clan did bad at disapproving Maki since she constantly surprises the audience and cast. Manga News felt the conflicts between the Zen'in sisters was well executed in the manga.

There was also commentary about Maki's role in Jujutsu Kaisen 0. According to Real, Maki is fundamental in starting Yuta's recovery from his trauma due to how she encourages him to earn the freedom he wants Mary Sue agreed with a similar praised for developing alongside Yuta; Real Sound particularly praised the bond the Jujutsu sorcerers have in general; in one volume, it is shown Maki trains Yuta and befriends in the process, which gives further depth to the main manga. Anime UK News felt that Maki's role in Jujutsu Kaisen 0 was better executed than in the main series based on her explored background. Digital Trends also felt that Maki's characterization was outstanding as she does not feel repetitive when dealing with Yuta as she feels different from the television series. Her action scenes were also noted be well executed by Hitc while calling her and the other students as comic relief in contrast to the more serious take on Yuta. The Mary Sue enjoyed Maki, calling her "an absolute QUEEN" and felt her backstory also standing out despite being similar to the main series. On the other hand, Otaquest lamented the demoted roles of the supporting characters in the finale when they are defeated by Geto. Similarly, Siliconera lamented that Maki's screentime in the film was limited as he liked the character and wished the franchise focused more on her.

Mikako Komatsu's performance as Maki was also praised by One Sports, considering her one of the best in the cast. Den of Geek regarded Maki as one of the best used female characters in shonen manga due to how she is portrayed as a skilled warrior rather than previous series where the female cast was used for a supportive role. The handling of her fights was also noted as she comes across as equally powerful as the protagonist Yuji Itadori despite having poor energy in comparison which heavily connects to her backstory which she takes seriously. Polygon agreed claiming that while there are series like Bleach, Soul Eater, Hunter x Hunter among feature similar female characters, their roles are limited or have unnispired powered when compared with the ones of the male characters. Comic Book Resources noted that Maki took a somber personality following the Shibuya arc while her body was so damaged in the process that it would surprise anime-only viewers. Anime News Network praised her fight against the entire Zen'in clan shown in the Culling Games, comparing it to the Kill Bill films as well Mappa's animation. With the epilogue's release in the final volume, while no textual confirmation was given in the epilogue itself, GameRant noted fans were satisfied as it looked likely that Yuta ended forming a family Maki, assumed by the outward appearances of Yuta's grandchildren. This was an outcome some were looking forward to for a long time.
