= Jujutsu Kaisen 0 =

Japanese manga series by Gege Akutami

- Tankōbon volume cover, featuring Yuta Okkotsu (left) and Rika Orimoto (right)

呪術廻戦 0 東京都立呪術高等専門学校 (Jujutsu Kaisen Zero Tōkyō Toritsu Jujutsu Kōtō Senmon Gakkō)
- Genre: Adventure; Dark fantasy; Supernatural
- Manga
- Written by: Gege Akutami
- Published by: Shueisha
- English publisher: NA: Viz Media
- Imprint: Jump Comics
- Magazine: Jump Giga
- Original run: April 28, 2017 – July 28, 2017
- Volumes: 1
- Sequel
- Jujutsu Kaisen (2018–2024)
- Anime film
- Jujutsu Kaisen 0 (2021)
- icon

Jujutsu Kaisen 0 (Note: Known in Japan as Jujutsu Kaisen Zero: Tōkyō Toritsu Jujutsu Kōtō Senmon Gakkō (呪術廻戦 0 東京都立呪術高等専門学校; 'Jujutsu Kaisen 0: Tokyo Metropolitan Curse Technical School').) is a Japanese manga series written and illustrated by Gege Akutami. The manga, which was originally titled Tokyo Metropolitan Curse Technical School, (Note: Known in Japan as Tōkyō Toritsu Jujutsu Kōtō Senmon Gakkō (東京都立呪術高等専門学校).) was serialized in Shueisha's magazine Jump Giga from April to July 2017. After Akutami launched Jujutsu Kaisen in 2018, the series was retitled Jujutsu Kaisen 0—making it a prologue—and released in a single tankōbon volume in December 2018. It was licensed for English release in North America by Viz Media. The series follows Yuta Okkotsu, a young student who becomes a sorcerer and seeks to control the Cursed Spirit of his childhood friend Rika Orimoto.

Akutami wrote the series without any specific themes in mind, but he wanted to create cool-looking characters. Two editors often supported him while writing the manga. Jujutsu Kaisen 0 received an anime film adaptation by MAPPA, which was directed by Sunghoo Park and premiered in Japan in December 2021.

The manga was a commercial success in both Japan and North America. Critical response to the manga was generally positive; several reviewers praised Yuta's role and his relationship with Rika. Critics found Yuta more compelling than Jujutsu Kaisen's protagonist, Yuji Itadori, who, while having several similarities with Yuta, has a different characterization.

== Plot ==
Yuta Okkotsu is a timid, 16-year-old, high-school student who is haunted by Rika Orimoto, the Cursed Spirit of his childhood friend who died six years prior; they had promised to get married when they grew up. Whenever Yuta is bullied, Rika comes to his defense and violently kills his attackers. In November 2016, Yuta meets Satoru Gojo, a Jujutsu Sorcerer under whose guidance he joins the Tokyo Prefectural Jujutsu High School to learn how to control Rika. There, Yuta meets the sorcerers Panda, Maki Zen'in, and Toge Inumaki, who try exorcising Rika but are easily stopped by her. Yuta starts training with Maki, who mentors him in swordsmanship. During a mission, Maki motivates Yuta to fight if he wants to be accepted, which causes him to briefly control Rika to destroy a Cursed Spirit.

As three months pass, Yuta becomes more skilled, and is able to control Rika and develop a closer relationship with his fellow students. In a mission with Toge, Yuta is spotted by Suguru Geto, a powerful enemy sorcerer who was previously friends with Gojo, and wishes to eliminate all non-sorcerers. Launching an attack on Jujutsu society, Geto invades the school to take Rika by force. Fearing for Yuta's safety, Gojo sends Panda and Toge to the school, where they and Maki clash with Geto, who severely wounds them. Angered, Yuta releases Rika and promises to give her his soul if she helps him defeat their enemy. In the aftermath, Geto has escaped, but is grievously injured and missing an arm. He is found by Gojo, who thanks him for intentionally sparing the students. Both reflect on their old friendship before Gojo executes Geto.

After the battle, Yuta is surprised to find himself still alive. Gojo explains Rika did not curse Yuta; rather, when Rika died, Yuta accidentally cursed her using hidden energy he inherited from the figure Sugawara no Michizane, forcing her to remain by his side. Rika peacefully passes to the afterlife, asking an apologetic Yuta to live a full life. Yuta continues his work as a sorcerer with his friends, still wearing Rika's engagement ring.

== Production ==
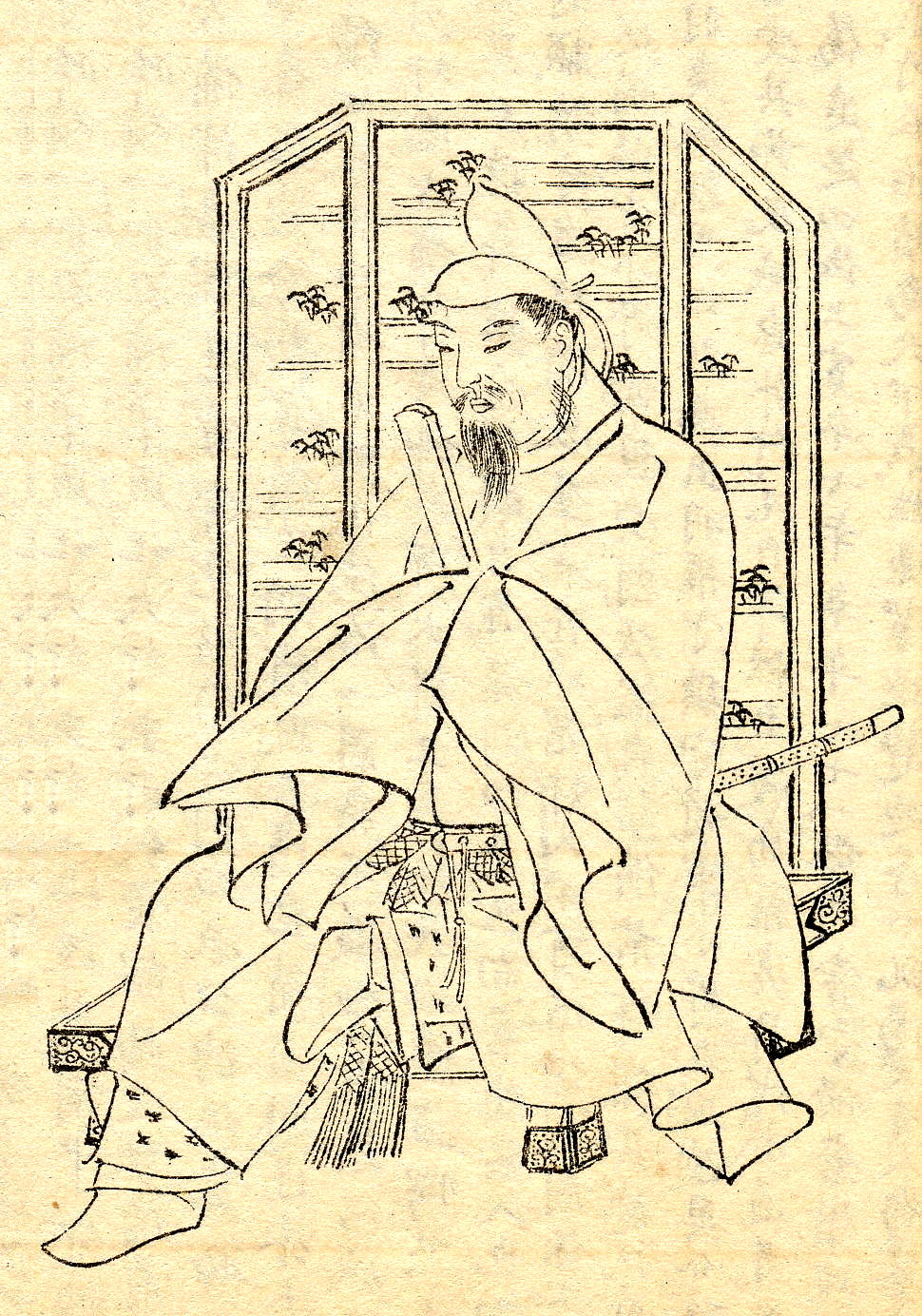
The inclusion of Sugawara no Michizane in the narrative was Akutami's tribute to their late editor.

In 2017, Gege Akutami suffered writer's block in regards to his manga, having lost the motivation he had when reading My Hero Academia and Hinomaru Sumo. He presented a horror-like manga in its prototype storyboard to his editor Yamanaka. Yuta and Rika remained in the same form as in the final product. The concept of the story was creating sorcerers who would be able to stop Yuta and Rika from killing others. Rather than Satoru Gojo, the character meant to recruit Yuta was Maki Zen'in. Yuta's relatives were meant to be included into the story, most notably his sister who would be taken by Rika over jealousy. Although several changes were made until the official version, Akutami believed he should have kept the original concept. Yamanaka was interested by the storyboard and talked to other members from Shueisha about it. However, Akutami was stressed about expectations. Yuta and Rika, the first characters created, were intended as a combination for the manga. Inspired by Masashi Kishimoto's manga series Naruto, Akutami said that Yuta and the Curse of Rika were influenced by the protagonist Naruto Uzumaki, who lives with a nine-tailed demon fox inside his body, and that both would become allies when joining forces. Similarly to Naruto's story, Yuta makes peace with Rika's curse, which tortures the character throughout the story.

Akutami included a line about Michizane Sugawara, a famous figure in Japanese history who is mentioned as Yuta and Gojo's predecessor, as a tribute to a late editor Yamanaka. When Yuta comforts Maki in the third chapter to the point she cries, the new editor Katayama said he liked it too much because he felt Yuta really understood Maki's feelings. Akutami decided to revise this scene in the storyboard following his editor's praise. He also said Suguru Geto is a strong villain, believing he could have won his fight against Yuta if he had destroyed the supernatural barrier between Shinjuku and Kyoto. Sugawara was added under the advice that the series should feature a real person.

Akutami's first editor claimed the story was interesting but too dark and persuaded him give it a school setting much to his anger. When learning that the manga would be written in Jump Giga instead of Weekly Shōnen Jump, Akutami was saddened by this decision and kept silent rather than argue over it. Akutami was still motivated when remembering that Mikki Yuki became famous in Jump Giga for writing Ginata Shiki. When Jujutsu Kaisen 0 was being written, the editor criticized the handling of Rika, believing a darker figure would be more suitable for the story, such as Oda Nobunaga. Yamanaka was transferred after the first chapter was published. The concept of Rika was that of an ordinary girl who would come across as evil when being remembered. Akutami placed hidden references to other works like Tite Kubo's Zombiepowder. while the first scene of Yuta being interrogated was influenced by the anime series Neon Genesis Evangelion. Akutami wanted to avoid a protagonist like himself due to his lack of credits but was still active. The plot was given training scenes and jokes to balance the story. Several parts of the manga were based on real life. The side character Ichiji and Yaga were based on people the author made. On the other hand, the ranking of sorcerers were made to contrast Akutami's high school which did not have such style. The third and fourth chapters were given a feeling of "climax" to reference it if there ever was a need to give it a series. While Akutami wished to incorporate many ideas, he realized by the third chapter that he made a mistake in relying on too many characters. As a result, the story was revised so that sorcerer-characters would play a smaller role.

=== Aftermath ===
During publication of the monthly series, Akutami had no intention of having his series published in Weekly Shōnen Jump. The positive response to Tokyo Metropolitan Curse Technical School, however, led him to turn the series into the main manga, Jujutsu Kaisen. When starting this series, Akutami had not planned any themes for the narrative but had the idea of giving the characters a cool appeal. The narrative of Jujutsu Kaisen 0 became connected with the other manga, with the final chapter being conceived as soon as he started writing it. He said, however, he was not sure about the possibility of properly connecting the beginning with the ending.

Akutami found that the early design of Yuta was so similar to that of fellow Jujutsu Sorcerer Megumi Fushiguro they might confuse readers. He noted the same similarities between Inumaki and Yuji Itadori. As a result, Akutami changed Yuta's look for the main series. The concept of Yuta and the curse hunted him inspired by Naruto would also be recycled for Jujutsu Kaisen involving the Yuji and Ryomen Sukuna. The original idea behind Rika was that she would become stronger the more time she spends with Yuta. However, this was revised under the advice of Akutami's superiors in order to give the manga a more proper ending. While Yuta's unique white uniform was designed as a reference to problematic students, in the end he dons a black outfit to better fit in with his classmates. Nevertheless, Akutami planned that once Yuta would return in Jujutsu Kaisen, he would once again wear a white uniform in hopes older readers would remember him.

== Release ==
The four-chapter series Tokyo Metropolitan Curse Technical School, was published in Shueisha's magazine Jump Giga from April 28 to July 28, 2017. The chapters were later published in a single tankōbon volume that was retroactively titled Jujutsu Kaisen 0 and released along with the third volume of Jujutsu Kaisen on December 4, 2018. A nine-page one-shot chapter, following the daily lives of Yuta and the other first-year students, was included in a "Jujutsu Kaisen #0.5 Tokyo Prefectural Jujutsu High School" booklet, released in December 2021, to promote the film adaptation of the story. During the month, Shueisha also released an alternative cover featuring Yuta and Yuji to connect it with the first volume of Jujutsu Kaisen.

In North America, Viz Media announced the English language release of the volume in July 2020. The volume was published on January 5, 2021.

No.	Title	Original release date	English release date
0	Blinding Darkness; Mabushii Yami (眩しい闇)	December 4, 2018; 978-4-08-881672-2	January 5, 2021; 978-1-9747-2014-9
1 "The Cursed Child" (呪いの子, Noroi no Ko); 2 "Deeply Blackened" (黒く黒く, Kuroku Kuroku); 3 "The Punishment for Being Weak" (弱者に罰を, Jakusha ni Batsu o); 4 "A Bright Darkness" (眩しい闇, Mabushii Yami)

== Adaptations ==
An anime film adaptation premiered in Japan on December 24, 2021.

A novel adaptation, written by Baraddo Kitaguni and based on a script by Hiroshi Seko, was published on the same day of the film's premiere on December 24, 2021.

A stage play adaptation, titled Stage Jujutsu Kaisen 0 with Live Band (舞台『呪術廻戦 0』WITH LIVE BAND), ran at the Tennozu Galaxy Theater in Tokyo from December 13–29, 2024, and at the Sky Theater MBS in Osaka on January 18 and 19, 2025.

A Jujutsu Kaisen 0-themed cafe event ran in Tokyo, Osaka, and Nagoya from August 29 to October 27, 2024.

== Reception ==
=== Sales ===
Jujutsu Kaisen 0 sold 70,774 print copies in its first week. According to Oricon, the manga had sold over 1.6 million copies between November 23, 2020, and May 23, 2021. It had sold over 1.9 million copies by November 2021. The volume was also popular with ICv2, noticing the manga's sudden popularity in Western regions might be connected to its release in January 2021. The book was ranked thirteenth in The New York Times' monthly Graphic Books list in January 2022. It once again took the fourteenth place in May 2022. In the NPD Group, the manga was ranked as the fifth-best-selling manga between late November 2021 and early January 2022. The volume was also the seventh best-selling volume of 2023 according to ICv2 ratings.

=== Critical response ===
Critics have commented about the manga's narrative. Since it was released after the earlier volumes outside of Japan, Anime News Network and The Mary Sue evaluated the story as a prequel, calling the introduction of Yuta, often mentioned in Jujutsu Kaisen, intriguing. Manga News enjoyed the focus on Yuta's tragic romance and their deep bond in the story, and hoped he might return in Jujutsu Kaisen. The site said the story reached a proper conclusion. Boston Bastard Brigade and Otaquest said Yuta is a more appealing character than Yuji Itadori due to their different curses, which Otaquest said makes Yuji simple, like Ichigo Kurosaki from Bleach, in contrast to the more compelling Yuta. Bleeding Cool regarded it as a story worth recommending for Valentine's Day. Comic Book Resources enjoyed the handling of Yuta's curse and his relationship with the antagonistic Geto. In retrospect review of the entire Jujutsu Kaisen manga series, Kevin Cormack of Anime News Network called Jujutsu Kaisen 0 "probably the best and most complete story in the franchise", praising the handling of Yuta's character arc and the emotional stakes it presents. He also praised Yuta's and Gojo's backstories as the best arcs Akutami has written due to their self-contained nature.

The Mary Sue saw parallels between Yuji and Yuta, both of whom deal with a curse they are trying to get rid of, although Yuta's growth makes him appealing because he stops wanting to die and appreciates his life. According to the reviewer, Yuta's cursing of Rika rather than the reverse felt like a strong twist. The supporting characters Maki, Panda and Inumaki were praised for developing alongside Yuta; Real Sound particularly praised the bond the Jujutsu Sorcerers have in general; in one volume, it is shown Maki trains Yuta and befriends in the process, which gives further depth to the main manga. Otaquest lamented the demoted roles of the supporting characters in the finale when they are defeated by Geto but noted the manga helps readers to further understand them. Despite Gojo being identical to his regular persona, critics found the pilot helps to further explore his past as a result of his tragic relationship with Geto, which reveals a major twist in the main series. Geto's link with Yuta through the late Sugawara no Michizane made Real Sound wonder if Akutami had planned to develop such character in the main series because it helps explain why the protagonist and his mentor are so powerful.

Comic Book Resources stated the manga's artwork was well executed to portray the character's emotions and the story's dark elements. Manga News also found the art interesting, especially the character designs, but often noted its strange proportions. The art was favorably compared with the sequel as Akutami's sharp line goes very well. The fight scenes were generally well-regarded by critics, which include the handling of limbs and explosions.

In Jungian Dimensions of the Mourning Process, Burial Rituals and Access to the Land of the Dead: Intimations of Immortality, the writer Hiroko Sakata addressed similarities between Yuta's story with the stories of the Japanese forgotten gods Hiruko, Katako and the suicidal child K, addressing Rika as an oni similar to Hiruko that often tries to stop Yuta in his backstory to avoid suicide similar to K. Both Yuta and Katako also share connections with oni and are often associated by mortals with them and, just like Yuta's curse, Katako cannot escape from life. As a result, Sakata said that Jujutsu Kaisen 0, and by extension the sequel, feel like modernized version of Japanese myths, comparing Yuta and Rika to the Demon Slayer: Kimetsu no Yaiba protagonists Tanjiro Kamado and Nezuko Kamado, respectively, as the duo aims to control the oni element present in the story.
