= Ryomen Sukuna =

Jujutsu Kaisen character

- Jujutsu Kaisen character
- Ryomen Sukuna in chapter 117 of Jujutsu Kaisen volume 14.
- First appearance: Jujutsu Kaisen #1, "Ryomen Sukuna" (2018)
- Last appearance: Jujutsu Kaisen "Epilogue" (2024)
- Created by: Gege Akutami
- Based on: Ryomen Sukuna
- Voiced by: Japanese: Junichi Suwabe; English: Ray Chase

In-universe information
- Aliases: The King of All Curses; The Disgraced One; The Strongest Sorcerer in History; The Fallen
- Species: Human (formerly); Reincarnated cursed object (Special-grade)
- Gender: Male
- Occupation: Curse user
- Affiliation: Curse Users
- Fighting style: Cursed Energy
- Weapon: Cursed Technique "Shrine": Cleave (Can target physical objects opposed to things with cursed energy); Dismantle (Only able to target things with cursed energy); Furnace (Open); Domain Expansion "Malevolent Shrine" (Uses both Dismantle and Cleave); Secret Technique: Hollow Wicker Basket; Reverse Cursed Technique; From Chapter 212: Cursed Technique "Ten Shadows"; From Chapter 236: "The World Cutting Slash""; From Chapter 237: Cursed tool "Kamutoke"; Historically: Cursed tool "Hiten"
- Family: Wasuke Itadori (reincarnation of his twin brother, who he cannibalized in the womb); Jin Itadori (fraternal nephew); Yuji Itadori (fraternal grand nephew); Kaori Itadori (via Kenjaku) (niece by marriage, was the wife of Jin Itadori who Kenjaku reincarnated 1000 years later)
- Religion: Buddhism and shinto
- Nationality: Japanese

Ryomen Sukuna (Japanese: 両面 宿儺, Hepburn: Ryōmen Sukuna) is a fictional character and one of the main antagonists of the manga and anime series Jujutsu Kaisen created by Gege Akutami. Sukuna is a powerful curse user, feared by many for his immense power and malevolent nature, and was regarded as the strongest jujutsu sorcerer during the Heian Era, the golden age of jujutsu sorcerers. Due to his reputation as a strong and evil sorcerer with immeasurable cursed energy, he was dubbed by many as the King of Curses.

In the anime adaptation, he is voiced by Junichi Suwabe in Japanese and Ray Chase in English. Sukuna's sadistic and "terrifying" demeanor as the series' villain was praised, along with the dual nature of his relationship with Yuji.

== Concept and creation ==
According to Akutami, Sukuna is "less of a sorcerer and more of a walking disaster." Sukuna was created as a cruel, narcissistic, depraved and supremely arrogant figure within the story. The real person turned mythological figure "Ryōmen-sukuna", who was the character's inspiration, traces back to the classical book Nihon Shoki, where Sukuna's fantasized physical figure (two faces and four arms, with 20 digits) and malicious demonic personality are shared with the character. In ancient history, Sukuna was an enemy to the Yamato family but was also worshiped by some as a deity. His association with demonic imagery was formed after the Imperial House of Japan declared him a vicious force of nature. Ryomen means "two-faced", which can be applied to the character both literally and figuratively. Sukuna did not ever have a wife or family in his life as a human, and was feared as a human less than Satoru Gojo due to how vicious the world of Curses was at the time he lived.

Inspired by Masashi Kishimoto's manga series Naruto, Yuta Okkotsu and the Curse of Rika were influenced by the protagonist Naruto Uzumaki who lives with a nine-tailed demon fox inside his body and both would become allies when joining forces. While Yuta would also make peace with the curse of Rika who keeps torturing the character throughout Jujutsu Kaisen 0, Akutami aimed to make a different dynamic in his next work Jujutsu Kaisen when developing the protagonist Yuji be constantly mocked and victimized by the antagonist Ryomen Sukuna. Furthermore, Gege stated Sukuna "will kill anybody in an instant" and that he has no morals, taking pleasure out of making things tough for Yuji Itadori.

== Appearances ==
Over 1,000 years ago, during the Heian era, Sukuna was the most powerful curse user at that time, served by an underling named Uraume. At the beginning of the story, his power is sealed in 20 mummified fingers scattered throughout the world. Megumi Fushiguro traces one of his fingers to Sugisawa High School. During an attack by cursed spirits, Yuji Itadori eats the finger and becomes a Jujutsu Sorcerer, with Sukuna regaining consciousness within him. Though Yuji has full control over his body, he is targeted for execution due to the danger Sukuna poses, with Satoru Gojo's patronage as his only protection.

In a mission to exorcise a Special Grade Cursed Spirit which holds one of Sukuna's fingers, Yuji and his colleagues are greatly endangered, so the young sorcerer gives Sukuna control of his body to defeat his assailant. Sukuna destroys the opponent but seizes the moment of freedom to rip out Yuji's heart to ensure he stays in control, ingesting one of his mummified fingers, then attempts to kill Fushiguro, becoming very interested in the latter. When Yuji wrestles back control to save his friend, he dies and meets Sukuna within his soul. Sukuna offers to return Yuji to life on two conditions, that Yuji allows him to take control of his body for a full minute when he chants "Enchain", and that Yuji will forget about this agreement. When Yuji does not oblige Sukuna informs him that even if he were to break the agreement, he would be punished for breaking the contract and even offers that for said full minute he will not kill or hurt anyone during said minute. When Yuji still says no, Sukuna offers they will fight to the death, If Yuji wins, he will revive him with no conditions. If Yuji loses then he gets revived with Sukuna's. Yuji agrees, to which he ultimately gets his head cut off by Sukuna. Sukuna remains silent from then on, only roused by an encounter with the Cursed Spirit Mahito, in which he mocks Yuji for losing a friend.

In the Shibuya Incident, Yuji is gravely injured, and the Cursed Spirit Jogo force-feeds him many of Sukuna's fingers. Sukuna, indifferent to Jogo but ultimately coming to praise his strength, kills him after a very destructive battle across the city. He reunites with Uraume after the battle, and states he has a plan to regain freedom. He then saves Megumi from Mahoraga, his summoned Shikigami, catastrophically razing much of Shibuya ward in the process, before surrendering control back to a traumatized Yuji.

Amid the Culling Games, Yuji, Megumi, and their two new allies Hana and Takaba are in a hotel discussing how to put an end to the culling games. Hana reveals her Cursed Technique is "Angel", who is an incarnated sorcerer who is bound to Hana, like Yuji and Sukuna. Angel has the power to negate Cursed Techniques. Megumi wants Hana to negate the Prison Realm seal containing Satoru Gojo to free him, which the Angel obliges, but says before that they must help them kill "The Disgraced One". Just then, Yuji is pulled into his and Sukuna's bonded soul. Sukuna warns Yuji that before anything escalates further, that he is "The Disgraced One".

Further through the Culling Games, Yuji, Megumi, and Hana end up rescuing Megumi's sister, Tsumiki. Soon it is revealed Tsumiki's body is being used by an incarnated sorcerer named "Yorozu" who is participating in the Culling Games to fight Sukuna. Yuji and Hana chase after Yorozu flees. Sukuna then chants the word "Enchain" to take over Yuji's body. He rips off Yuji's finger, claiming that the binding vow he and Yuji agreed on did not include him of not being injured. Sukuna transforms the ripped off finger into a cursed object, forcing Megumi to digest it in order to take over his body.

Hana and the Angel realize that "The Disgraced One" has taken over Megumi's body and uses Jacob's Ladder to negate Sukuna from Megumi's body. Sukuna tricks Hana into thinking Megumi has regained control and bites her arm off. Yuji and Sukuna are battling when Maki joins in to aid Yuji. Uraume shows up and aids Sukuna with a block of ice, and the two of them get away. Sukuna partakes in a ritual called "The Bath", where Uraume takes cursed spirits and wrings them out before they turn into dust, so Sukuna can submerge Megumi's soul deep within evil to prevent him from taking control. Sukuna returns to the colony and ends up killing a sorcerer along the way. Sukuna then meets up with Yorozu, proceeding to kill her to fully break Megumi's soul.

In Shinjuku Showdown, Sukuna challenges Satoru Gojo to a duel, Gojo nearly wins but gets caught off guard when Sukuna makes a binding vow to use "World Cutting Slash" on Gojo, killing him, but at the cost of every use after required the hand signs, chants, and manual aim. The remaining sorcerers watching the battle attempt to fight Sukuna in Gojo's place but are overpowered once Sukuna regains his true form. While battling, Sukuna is caught off guard when he sees Gojo reappear, only to be revealed that its Yuta utilizing Kenjaku's technique. Sukuna gets caught in Yuji's newly formed domain expansion, who tries persuading Sukuna to change while strolling through Yuji's hometown. Sukuna gets hit by Nobara when Nobara used her technique on the last finger hidden by Gojo, which allows Yuji to deliver a final blow to Sukuna. Yuji offers one final chance to Sukuna, but Sukuna refuses and disintegrates right after.

== Reception ==
Chingy Nea of Polygon praised the way Sukuna was a "cruel and emotionless sadist" and how he helped the anime "feign predictability" by having him kill Yuji early on in the story. Sukuna's awakening in Yuji's body was described "disgusting and fantastic". David Eckstein-Schoemann of the UNF Spinnaker praised the duality between main character and protagonist. He said that "you think of all the possibilities...and they take full advantage of that. The conflict and interactions between Yuji and Sukuna are both creative and brilliant. It plays a lot with your expectations."

The character and Chase's performance in the dub was praised: "[he] lights up the screen as a newly incarnated Cursed Spirit, Ryomen Sukuna, as an elated insatiable animal that takes pleasure in grazing on the fear and flesh of humans and fills Fushiguro with a sense of dread of what's to come." The character was also compared to Bleach's protagonist Ichigo Kurosaki and his Hollow persona due their parallels especially in his early appearances; such being young fighters who develop supernatural powers as well as evil alter-egos in order to protect people from giant monsters. Comic Book Resources compared Itadori's temptation to use Sukuna as temptation similar to other shōnen heroes such Ichigo's Hollow persona as analysis of how everybody has inner conflicts.

In a Viz Media popularity poll conducted in March 2021, Sukuna was voted as the ninth most popular character in the series. At the 5th Crunchyroll Anime Awards, Sukuna won Best Antagonist while his fight against Satoru Gojo was nominated for Best Fight Scene.
