= Megumi Fushiguro =

Fictional character from Jujutsu Kaisen

- Jujutsu Kaisen character
- Megumi Fushiguro as drawn by Gege Akutami for Jujutsu Kaisen volume two with his shikigami, Nue
- First appearance: Jujutsu Kaisen #1, "Ryomen Sukuna" (2018)
- Created by: Gege Akutami
- Voiced by: Japanese: Yuma Uchida (teen); Natsumi Fujiwara (young); English: Robbie Daymond

In-universe information
- Gender: Male
- Occupation: Student at Tokyo Jujutsu High
- Affiliation: Jujutsu Sorcerer
- Fighting style: Cursed Energy
- Family: Naobito Zen'in (great uncle); Naoya Zen'in (uncle); Ogi Zen'in (great uncle); Jinichi Zen'in (uncle); Toji Fushiguro (father); Tsumiki Fushiguro (step-sister); Maki Zen'in (first cousin once removed); Mai Zen'in (first cousin once removed)
- Nationality: Japanese

Megumi Fushiguro (Japanese: 伏黒 恵, Hepburn: Fushiguro Megumi) is a fictional character of the manga series Jujutsu Kaisen created by Gege Akutami. He is a first-year student at Tokyo Jujutsu High, an academy to become a Jujutsu Sorcerer and develop Cursed Techniques to fight against Cursed Spirits, beings manifested from Cursed Energy due to negative emotions flowing from humans. He is a descendant to the Zen'in family, one of the three clans dominating the world of sorcery. Early in Jujutsu Kaisen, he is instructed by teacher Satoru Gojo to locate one of Ryomen Sukuna's mummified fingers, which leads to him partnering with and befriending Yuji Itadori, a fellow first-year Jujutsu Sorcerer who ate the finger and caused Ryomen Sukuna to incarnate.

In the Jujutsu Kaisen anime adaptation, he is voiced by Yuma Uchida (with Natsumi Fujiwara voicing his younger self) in Japanese and Robbie Daymond in English. Praise for the character was focused on his dynamic with Yuji and the animation of his fight scenes in the anime.

== Concept and creation ==
Before the creation of Jujutsu Kaisen, Akutami conceived an earlier version of the series titled Sousen in which Megumi was originally intended to be the protagonist. In this draft, Megumi was named Megumi Wanibuchi ("wani" meaning "crocodile" and "buchi" meaning "deep pool" or "abyss") and was portrayed as a 15-year-old who chose to work after graduating from middle school rather than attend college, so that he could spend more time with his blind and ill sister, Tsumiki. However, the initial draft failed to secure serialization, prompting Akutami to rework the concept to better suit a shōnen magazine demographic. Akutami described Megumi's characterization as relatively hardened, while Yuji Itadori had a softer and more relatable demeanor. Consequently, their intended roles were switched, with Yuji becoming the protagonist and Megumi taking up the role of a deuteragonist. In the new draft of Jujutsu Kaisen, according to Akutami, Megumi was designed to be a foil to Yuji Itadori and Nobara Kugisaki. He was written as a more insightful character than either due to his greater proclivity towards negative thinking and lack of trust towards others. Akutami also stated that he is a "rather depressing" character compared to Itadori, and that he was created to care less about strangers' fates like Itadori and more when animals die. Akutami was careful to make sure that Megumi's character design was differentiated from Itadori's, as they are largely familiar.

His first name, Megumi, is typically a female name meaning "blessing" or "grace". Because of this, he largely goes by his last name. He was written to be a more gloomy contrast to other characters in the series, and his deranged laugh while fighting a finger-bearing Curse was meant to exemplify his lack of outward joy. Japanese voice actor Yuma Uchida said Megumi was "oppressive but cool when he fights."

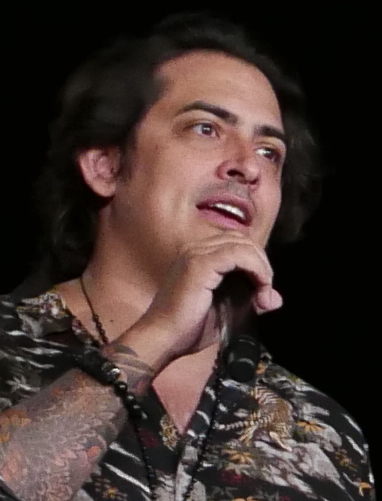
Robbie Daymond provided the English voice for Megumi Fushiguro.

From American voice actor Robbie Daymond, "he is trying so hard to be the 'straight man' your interpretation of it is that it's an act or a front. Yes, that's who he is, but only a part of it. There is some other part of him that wants to come forward", adding that "when he does sort of get twisted up with Yuji and Gojo and they affect him emotionally, he expresses those things underneath a veneer of sullenness, and it's a fun challenge." Daymond felt that "I still love those straight on the nose, heart on the sleeve shonen characters that I get to play; but I think the more complicated ones are more enjoyable in sessions."

== Appearances ==
As a child, Megumi was born into the Zen'in clan and left orphaned by his parents, to be looked after by his step-sister Tsumiki, who he sees as an inspiration. He was then tutored by Satoru Gojo as a young child, an incredibly powerful sorcerer who killed his father, Toji Fushiguro, ten years prior. Toji was a powerful fighter born with a "heavenly restriction," which prevented him from using cursed energy in return for improved physical ability. Due to his unusual abilities, he was on bad terms with his family, the Zen'in clan, and took the last name Fushiguro upon marriage.

Megumi first appears in Jujutsu Kaisen alongside Yuji after he discovers Yuji has found one of Sukuna's fingers. After Yuji eats Sukuna's fingers, Yuji and Megumi become partners at Jujutsu High under the tutelage of Gojo. He is present when Nobara Kugisaki arrives in Tokyo, and strikes up a reluctant friendship with her and Yuji. During an altercation with a "Cursed Womb" at a detention facility, Megumi fights Sukuna, who becomes interested in Megumi for his power and will. After the fight, Yuji appears to die in front of Megumi.

During an exchange event between the Tokyo and Kyoto Jujutsu schools, which was interrupted by a group of powerful cursed spirits (The "Disaster Curses"), Megumi fights and is defeated due to injuries sustained at the hands of Hanami, a cursed spirit. During a mission with Nobara and Yuji, Megumi fights a cursed spirit bearing one of Sukuna's fingers and triumphs in the battle after successfully expanding his domain for the first time, a high-level ability considered the "pinnacle" of sorcery. However, he loses consciousness due to exhaustion and injuries shortly afterwards.

He, along with many other Jujutsu Sorcerers, are sent to Shibuya when the Disaster Curses and their allies prepare to attack Japan. A Curse User named Ogami inadvertently resurrects Toji (his father). Due to the nature of his resurrection, Toji quickly becomes highly aggressive and loses higher order thinking skills. Megumi and Yuji defeat Curse User Jiro Awasaka. Megumi also assists in the defeat of Dagon, a powerful cursed spirit, who Toji finished off. Immediately afterwards, Toji attacks Megumi. After a small fight, Toji regains consciousness and commits suicide. Megumi is then attacked by a curse user, and he summons Mahoraga, an uncontrolled but highly powerful shikigmi, as a form of mutually assured destruction. Sukuna then saves him and defeats Mahoraga. At the end of the Shibuya Incident arc, Tsumiki, his sister, is possessed by ancient sorcerer Yorozu, awakens from her coma that was inflicted by a Cursed Spirit, and is forced to participate in the Culling Game between the Curse Users of Japan.

He inadvertently becomes the head of the Zen'in clan after the clan's previous head was killed in battle. Entering the game with Yuji, they are split up as soon as the culling game begins, fighting enemy Curse Users and forming alliances in an attempt to defeat Kenjaku, the powerful Curse User who started the destruction.

== Powers and abilities ==
Megumi is proficient in hand-to-hand combat, defaulting to weaponry and Cursed Techniques in battle. His "cursed technique" (unique ability) is the Ten Shadows Technique, inherited from the Zen'in family, allowing him to summon ten different Cursed Spirits (using shadows as a medium) that will fight alongside him. However, besides the Divine Dogs, he needs to defeat the Shikigami in battle to control him. His cursed spirit allies, called "Shikigami", are a variety of animals, being Divine Dog/s (Two dogs), Nue (An owl), Gama (A frog), Orochi (A snake), Max Elephant (An elephant), Rabbit Escape (A swarm of rabbits), Round Deer (A deer), Piercing Ox (An ox), and Tiger Funeral/ Mourning Tiger. (Unknown, though likely a tiger). The tenth and most powerful Shikigami, Eight-Handled Sword Divergent Sila Divine General Mahoraga (Usually stylized as Mahoraga, or Makora in Japanese) is a humanoid Shikigami with the ability to adapt to situations that disadvantage it. Megumi often attempts to summon Mahoraga as a form of mutually assured destruction. When a Shikigami of the Ten Shadows under the Ten Shadows user's control is destroyed or killed, they cannot be summoned or manifested ever again. However, aspects of the destroyed/deceased Shikigami is passed on to others, making them stronger. This is shown with the Divine Dogs, as when the white Divine Dog died after being killed by a special grade cursed spirit in chapter 6, its black twin inherited its power, taking on the form of a large bicolor werewolf called Divine Dog: Totality.

His Domain Expansion, a powerful technique which encloses an area and amplifies the users Cursed Technique, is called Chimera Shadow Garden. It covers the ground in a shadowy liquid which allows him to call up shikigami with ease and summon multiple at the same time, using their skills to overwhelm enemy attackers.According to the character Reggie Star, the shadowy "liquid" has no buoyancy, no oxygen and does not flow, making it almost identical to the conditions of a vacuum.

== Reception ==
Rebecca Silverman Anime News Network said Megumi was the least interesting protagonist from the manga's first chapters. Megumi's fight with the Special Grade Curse was listed as the third best anime fight from 2021 by Crunchyroll. In a review for episode 23 of the anime, "The Origin Of Blind Obedience Part 2", Charles Hartford praised the depth and exploration of Megumi's character. He stated: "As he gets pushed to his limit, we see him dig deeper into his powers than has previously been shown" and that "the result of which is a display of power that serves to elevate Megumi in the pantheon of Jujutsu Sorcerers and give MAPPA an excellent opportunity to work some of their trademark visual magic." Olive St. Sauver compared his and Yuji's friendship to Black Clover's Asta and Yuno because of how they "care for each other and are excited to see the other succeed...the desire to surpass the other comes from healthy competition rather than envy." David Eckstein-Schoemann of The Spinnaker, in a review for the anime, stated how he "[liked] seeing Yuuji work off of Megumi ...every character here has a distinct design, a distinct way of fighting, and a unique personality that leaves an impact whenever you see them." There was also negative response over the character in the manga's series after the Culling Games. This was mostly because Megumi becomes the new vessel of Sukuna, which effectively removes him from the story. Although Yuji tries to reach him to rescue him from the villain, Megumi's rejection for what Sukuna did with his body led to more negative response to publication as it feels like his character is being wasted by Akutami especially despite having too much potential. In May 2022, manga author Kenta Shinohara did his own tribute to the character of Megumi alongside Yuji and Yuta. Megumi's tactics and power level have repeatedly come into question from the fanbase, with some labeling Megumi as 'Potential Man', in reference to the perceived disparity between his stated power level and what is seen on screen.

In the 2026 Anime Grand Prix, Megumi and the character's voice actor Yuma Uchida were ranked second for "Best Character" and "Best Voice Actor" respectively.
