= Gege Akutami =

Japanese manga artist (born 1992)

Gege Akutami 芥見下々
- Born: Gege Akutami; February 26, 1992 (age 34) Iwate Prefecture, Japan
- Area: Manga artist
- Notable works: Jujutsu Kaisen

Gege Akutami (Japanese: 芥見下々, Hepburn: Akutami Gege; born February 26, 1992) is a Japanese manga artist known for the manga series Jujutsu Kaisen.

== Biography ==
Gege Akutami was born in Iwate Prefecture, afterwards he moved to Sendai in Miyagi Prefecture in fifth grade. Akutami began drawing manga by mimicking a friend, which inspired him to become a professional manga artist. Akutami has named Tite Kubo as an influence in his work after reading Bleach in fourth grade, in addition to Hunter × Hunter and Neon Genesis Evangelion among other works. In 2014, Gege Akutami started working as an assistant to Yasuhiro Kanō in Kiss x Death.

He published his first work the same year, titled "Kamishiro Sōsa" (神代捜査), a one-shot chapter published in Shueisha's Jump NEXT! vol. 2 on May 7, 2014. His next work was No.9, with a one-shot chapter published in Jump NEXT! vol. 2 on May 1, 2015, and another one-shot in the 46th issue of Weekly Shōnen Jump on October 10, 2015. Akutami would publish the one-shot "Nikai Bongai Barabarjura" (二界梵骸バラバルジュラ) in the 2016 44th issue of Weekly Shōnen Jump, released on October 3, 2016. This one-shot was nominated for the 11th "Gold Future Cup" contest of the magazine.

In 2017, Akutami published Tokyo Metropolitan Curse Technical School (東京都立呪術高等専門学校, Tōkyō Toritsu Jujutsu Kōtō Senmon Gakkō), a 4-chapter series that ran in Jump Giga from April 28 to July 28, 2017. This series later served as a prologue to his next work, Jujutsu Kaisen, being retroactively titled as Jujutsu Kaisen 0. Akutami began the publication of Jujutsu Kaisen in the 2018 14th issue of Weekly Shōnen Jump, released on March 5, 2018. The series ended in the 44th issue of Weekly Shōnen Jump on September 30, 2024.

== Works ==
Title	Year	Magazine	Publisher(s)	Notes	Ref.
Kamishiro Sousa (神代捜査)	2014	Shōnen Jump Next!	Shueisha	One-shot	
No. 9	2015	Shōnen Jump Next!	Shueisha	One-shot	
No. 9	2015	Weekly Shōnen Jump	Shueisha	One-shot	
Nikai Bongai Barabarujura (二界梵骸バラバルジュラ)	2016	Weekly Shōnen Jump	Shueisha	One-shot	
Tokyo Metropolitan Curse Technical School (東京都立呪術高等専門学校, Tōkyō Toritsu Jujutsu Kōtō Senmon Gakkō) (Note: Also known as Jujutsu Kaisen 0)	2017	Jump Giga	Shueisha (Japanese); Viz Media (English)	Manga	
Jujutsu Kaisen (呪術廻戦)	2018–2024	Weekly Shōnen Jump	Shueisha (Japanese); Viz Media (English)	Manga	
Jujutsu Kaisen Modulo (呪術廻戦≡(モジュロ), Jujutsu Kaisen Mojuro)	2025–2026	Weekly Shōnen Jump	Shueisha (Japanese)	Manga (illustrated by Yuji Iwasaki)	

== Awards ==
In 2016, Akutami's one-shot Nikai Bongai Barabarujura was nominated for Weekly Shōnen Jump's 11th Gold Future Cup contest. In 2019, his manga Jujutsu Kaisen was nominated for the 65th Shogakukan Manga Award in the shōnen category. Akutami is the 2020 grand prize winner for Jujutsu Kaisen on Mando Kobayashi, Kendo Kobayashi's monthly manga variety show, where winners are selected on his personal taste. In 2021, Akutami's Jujutsu Kaisen was listed as a nominee for the 25th Annual Tezuka Osamu Cultural Prize.
