= List of Undead Unluck chapters =

Undead Unluck is a Japanese manga series written and illustrated by Yoshifumi Tozuka. A one-shot chapter was published in Shueisha's shōnen manga magazine Weekly Shōnen Jump in January 2019. The manga was serialized in the same magazine from January 20, 2020, to January 27, 2025. Shueisha collected its chapters in 27 individual tankōbon volumes, released from April 3, 2020, to April 4, 2025.

The manga is digitally serialized by Viz Media on its Shonen Jump website. In October 2020, Viz Media announced the print and digital publication of the manga. The 27 volumes were released from May 4, 2021, to October 20, 2026.

== Volumes ==
No.	Title	Original release date	English release date
1	Undead and Unluck; Andeddo Anrakku (不死と不運(アンデッドアンラック))	April 3, 2020; 978-4-08-882310-2	May 4, 2021; 978-1-9747-1926-6
1. "Undead and Unluck" (不死と不運(アンデッドアンラック), Andeddo Anrakku); 2. "Union"; 3. "What Do You Negate?" (お前は何を否定する, Omae wa Nani o Hitei Suru); 4. "How to Use My Unluck" (私の不運の使い方, Watashi no Fuun o Tsukai Kata); 5. "Which One Are You?" (アナタはどっち?, Anata wa Dotchi?); 6. "You Haven't Changed At All" (やっぱりアナタは変わらない, Yappari Anata wa Kawaranai); 7. "Let's Bring in Some Change" (変わろうぜ, Kawarō ze)
2	United We Negate; Wareware wa Hitei Suru (我々は否定する)	June 4, 2020; 978-4-08-882330-0	July 6, 2021; 978-1-9747-2350-8
8. "Do You Love the Change in Me?" (変わる私は好きですか?, Kawaru Watashi wa Suki desu ka); 9. "United We Negate" (我々は否定する, Wareware wa Hitei Suru); 10. "This Is the Costume I Want" (これが私の着たい服(コスチューム), Kore ga Watashi no Kosuchūmu); 11. "Longing"; 12. "Spoil"; 13. "Revenge"; 14. "Dream"; 15. "Truth"; 16. "Victhor"
3	It Won't Repair Till I Die; Ore ga Shinu Made Naoranai (俺が死ぬまで治らない)	September 4, 2020; 978-4-08-882404-8	September 7, 2021; 978-1-9747-2465-9
17. "Exam"; 18. "Return"; 19. "Result"; 20. "Keep Your Hands Off Planet Earth" (この地球(ほし)に手を出すな, Kono Hoshi ni Te o Dasu na); 21. "So Long as You're in There, I'll Never Give Up" (そこにいるなら何度だって, Soko ni Irunara Nando Datte); 22. "Which Is Better?" (どっちがいいのかな, Dotchi ga Ii no Kana); 23. "It Won't Repair Till I Die" (俺が死ぬまで治らない, Ore ga Shinu Made Naoranai); 24. "Someone Irreplaceable" (かけがえのない人, Kakegae no Nai Hito); 25. "If We Can Have Normal Bodies" (普通の身体に戻れたら, Futsū no Karada ni Modoretara)
4	Revolution	December 4, 2020; 978-4-08-882472-7	November 2, 2021; 978-1-9747-2466-6
26. "Not So Much as a Finger" (指一本だって, Yubi Ippon Datte); 27. "The Only One Dying Is You" (死ぬのはお前だ, Shinu no wa Omaeda); 28. "Crimson Bullet" (紅蓮弾(クリムゾンバレット), Kurimuzon Baretto); 29. "Under"; 30. "So, Please Allow Me" (だからボクを, Dakara Boku o); 31. "Revolution"; 32. "Unbelievable"; 33. "Unluck on Our Side" (不運がついてる, Fuun ga Tsuiteru); 34. "This World Will Always Be" (この世はいつだって, Kono Yo wa Itsu Datte)
5	As Long as They Don't Forget; Wasurenakereba (忘れなければ)	March 4, 2021; 978-4-08-882549-6	January 4, 2022; 978-1-9747-2712-4
35. "This World Is" (この世界は, Kono Sekai wa); 36. "I Wasn't Alone" (一人じゃない, Hitori Janai); 37. "Undead + Unluck" (アンデッド+アンラック, Andeddo + Anrakku); 38. "Anno Un" (安野雲, Anno Un); 39. "Don't Need a Left Hand to Draw Manga" (左手なくても漫画は描ける, Hidarite Nakute mo Manga wa Kakeru); 40. "Andy?" (アンディ?, Andi?); 41. "Couldn't Care Less About Pain" (痛みなんざどうでもいい, Itami Nanza Dōdemo Ii); 42. "As Long as They Don't Forget" (忘れなければ, Wasurenakereba); 43. "Deadline"
6	To You, From Me; Kimi ni Tsutaware (君に伝われ)	April 30, 2021; 978-4-08-882596-0	March 1, 2022; 978-1-9747-2849-7
44. "Undead vs. Undead" (不死VS不死(アンデッドアンデッド), Andeddo Andeddo); 45. "Unluck Bullet" (不運弾(アンラクバレット), Anrakku Baretto); 46. "See You in the Here and Now" (現在で会おう, Ima de Aō); 47. "Akira Kuno" (九能明, Kunō Akira); 48. "A Story I Won't See Coming" (ボクの知らない物語, Boku no Shiranai Monogatari); 49. "It's All Ours" (こっちのもんだ, Kotchi no Monda); 50. "It's Up to You Now" (任せたよ, Makaseta yo); 51. "Hero" (ヒーロー, Hīrō); 52. "To You, From Me" (君に伝われ, Kimi ni Tsutaware)
7	Tetsuzanko; Tetsuzankō (鉄山靠)	July 2, 2021; 978-4-08-882713-1	May 17, 2022; 978-1-9747-3003-2
53. "Have Any Black Tea?" (紅茶はあるかい?, Kōcha wa Aru kai?); 54. "Hope" (希望, Kibō); 55. "Use Your Rules" (己が理(ルール)で, Ono ga Rūru de); 56. "Because You Believe" (信じているから, Shinjiteiru kara); 57. "Jìngcái" (精彩(チンツァイ), Chintsai); 58. "Eyes of the Dragon" (龍の目, Ryū no Me); 59. "Tetsuzanko" (鉄山靠, Tetsuzankō); 60. "Truth" (真実, Shinjitsu); 61. "Interest" (興味, Kyōmi)
8	Be Back Soon; Itte Kuru (行ってくる)	October 4, 2021; 978-4-08-882796-4	July 19, 2022; 978-1-9747-3204-3
62. "Undead and Untruth" (不死と不真実(アンデッドアントゥルース), Andeddo Anturūsu); 63. "Who I Love So Much" (私の大好きな, Watashi no Daisuki na); 64. "As It Stands, I Am" (今の僕が, Ima no Boku ga); 65. "You Have My Thanks" (感謝します, Kanshashimasu); 66. "That Is the Truth" (それが真実, Sore ga Shinjitsu); 67. "Fireworks" (花火, Hanabi); 68. "Be Back Soon" (行ってくる, Itte Kuru); 69. "I'm Going to Uncover It" (確かめるんだ, Tashikamerunda); 70. "Spring" (春(スプリング), Supuringu)
9	To Love; Suki tte (好きって)	December 3, 2021; 978-4-08-882874-9	October 18, 2022; 978-1-9747-3421-4
71. "To Love" (好きって, Suki tte); 72. "Sincere" (真心, Magokoro); 73. "That's Fine by Me" (上等だ, Jōtō da); 74. "Let's Get This Plan Started" (作戦開始, Sakusen Kaishi); 75. "Do It Up" (任せたぜ, Makaseta ze); 76. "Reach the Speed of Light" (光の速さに, Hikari no Hayasa ni); 77. "On Your Mark"; 78. "Get Set, Go" (Set Go!!); 79. "In Spite of That, I" (なのに俺は, Nanoni Ore wa)
10	Swear By My Heart; Kokoro ni Kakete (心にかけて)	March 4, 2022; 978-4-08-883035-3	January 17, 2023; 978-1-9747-3614-0
80. "It's Hard Lettin' Go" (寂しいな, Sabishii na); 81. "One-on-One" (一対一(タイマン), Taiman); 82. "Take a Look" (視てくれよ, Mite Kure yo); 83. "The Lives You Wager Shall Be" (賭ける命は, Kakeru Inochi wa); 84. "Let's Play" (遊ぼうよ, Asobō yo); 85. "Round One" (一本目, Ippon-me); 86. "My Armor Is" (私の鎧は, Watashi no Yoroi wa); 87. "Round Two" (二本目, Nihon-me); 88. "Swear By My Heart" (心にかけて, Kokoro ni Kakete)
11	The Four Dead Seasons; Shiki (死季)	May 2, 2022; 978-4-08-883096-4	April 18, 2023; 978-1-9747-3661-4
89. "Round Three" (三本目, Sanbon-me); 90. "You Negating Lugs" (否定者諸君(ヤロー共), Yarō-domo); 91. "Go On and Play" (遊んで来い, Asonde Koi); 92. "Taste" (粋, Iki); 93. "The Song of Spring" (春ノ歌, Haru no Uta); 94. "The Four Dead Seasons" (死季, Shiki); 95. "Skip It" (越えろ, Koero); 96. "Ghost Soul" (靈魂, Reikon); 97. "Rotten Bastard" (クソヤロー, Kusoyarō)
12	Restart; Risutāto (リスタート)	July 4, 2022; 978-4-08-883162-6	July 18, 2023; 978-1-9747-3872-4
98. "Restart" (リスタート, Risutāto); 99. "Save Me, God" (助けて神様, Tasukete Kamisama); 100. "Hard Mode" (ハードモード, Hādo Mōdo); 101. "Regulation"; 102. "Regulator" (調整者(レギュレーター), Regyurētā); 103. "Negator vs. Regulator" (否定者対調整者(レギュレーター), Hiteisha tai Regyurētā); 104. "Your Ability Is" (お前の能力(ちから)は, Omae no Chikara wa); 105. "Land Ho" (ヨーソロー, Yōsorō); 106. "Human Rules Are Always" (人の理(ルール)はいつだって, Hito no Rūru wa Itsu Datte)
13	R.I.P.	September 2, 2022; 978-4-08-883228-9	October 17, 2023; 978-1-9747-4070-3
107. "Confuse"; 108. "Reason"; 109. "R.I.P."; 110. "God of Death" (死神, Shinigami); 111. "Entrust"; 112. "Room 25"; 113. "Forget"; 114. "Ichico Nemuri" (イチコ = ネムリ, Ichiko Nemuri); 115. "Don't Leave Me"
14	Andy; Andi (アンディ)	December 2, 2022; 978-4-08-883386-6	January 16, 2024; 978-1-9747-4298-1
116. "Stake Your Soul on the Sword" (劍魂一擲, Kenkon Itteki); 117. "Forgive"; 118. "Define" (定め, Sadame); 119. "If I Can't Overcome Him" (超えられなければ, Koerarenakereba); 120. "This Is Much Easier" (楽でいいな, Rakude Ii na); 121. "Unfair" (不公平, Fukōhei); 122. "It's In Your Nature" (そんなキミだから, Sonna Kimi Dakara); 123. "Reset"; 124. "Andy" (アンディ, Andi)
15	Loop ~Time to Go~	February 3, 2023; 978-4-08-883425-2	April 16, 2024; 978-1-9747-4350-6
125. "11 Minutes" (11分, Jūichi-bun); 126. "Advent"; 127. "Luna and Sun" (月(ルナ)と太陽(サン), Runa to San); 128. "Strict Defense"; 129. "Sacred Spirit Treasures" (心器, Jingi); 130. "It's for Your Own Good" (お前の為なんだ, Omae no Tamenanda); 131. "Thank You" (ありがとう, Arigatō); 132. "Loop ~Time to Go~"; 133. "Roadmap"
16	If You're the You That I Knew; Watashi ga Shitteru Anata nara (私が知ってるあなたなら)	May 2, 2023; 978-4-08-883491-7	July 16, 2024; 978-1-9747-4618-7
134. "If You're the You That I Knew" (私が知ってるあなたなら, Watashi ga Shitteru Anata nara); 135. "Psycho Pod"; 136. "Never Change" (変わらない, Kawaranai); 137. "So Long As You Don't Change" (変わらなければ, Kawaranakereba); 138. "Incentive"; 139. "Meeting"; 140. "Metamorfall" (変化の秋(メタモルフォール), Metamorufōru); 141. "Face to Face"; 142. "Face-Off"
17	Horizon	July 4, 2023; 978-4-08-883565-5	October 15, 2024; 978-1-9747-4918-8
143. "You Can't Avoid This!"; 144. "Next Ring"; 145. "In the War"; 146. "Sasanqua for Three" (三參花, Sazanka); 147. "Run-In"; 148. "Third Dog" (三番目の犬(サードドッグ), Sādo Doggu); 149. "You See Me Now?"; 150. "No More War!"; 151. "Horizon"
18	Welcome to Earth	October 4, 2023; 978-4-08-883664-5	January 21, 2025; 978-1-9747-5173-0
152. "Gun Fight"; 153. "Fair Play"; 154. "Select"; 155. "You Seem To Be In Trouble" (お困りのようだな, Okomari no Yōda na?); 156. "Right Stuff"; 157. "Save You"; 158. "Don't Think, Feel"; 159. "Entruster"; 160. "Welcome to Earth"
19	Dumb Son; Baka Musuko (馬鹿息子)	December 4, 2023; 978-4-08-883786-4	April 15, 2025; 978-1-9747-5237-9
161. "Tenraisai" (天擂祭); 162. "Master Me, Respect Me" (師々尊々, Shishi Sonson); 163. "Bad Road" (凶運ノ道(バッドロード), Baddo Rōdo); 164. "The Last Trial Is" (最後の試練は, Saigo no Shiren wa); 165. "As It Stands, You Are" (今のあなたは, Ima no Anata wa); 166. "Untruth" (不真実(アントゥルース), Anturūsu); 167. "Dumb Son" (馬鹿息子, Baka Musuko); 168. "That I Always Dreamed of" (憧れの, Akogareno); 169. "School, That Is" (学校って, Gakkō tte)
20	I Managed to Move; Ugoketanda (動けたんだ)	February 2, 2024; 978-4-08-883816-8	June 17, 2025; 978-1-9747-5577-6
170. "I Want to Move" (動きたいんだ, Ugokitainda); 171. "So I Will" (だからボクは, Dakara Boku wa); 172. "I Managed to Move" (動けたんだ, Ugoketanda); 173. "That Jerk as He Stands Is" (今のアイツは, Ima no Aitsu wa); 174. "Un Prince Charmant" (白馬の王子様(アン プランス シャルマン), An Puransu Sharuman); 175. "RIP"; 176. "That's the Whole Reason" (その為にオレは, Sono Tame ni Ore wa); 177. "Let's Get Started" (始めよう, Hajimeyō); 178. "That Wound There" (その傷は, Sono Kizu wa)
21	One Minute; Ichibun (一分)	May 2, 2024; 978-4-08-884020-8	September 16, 2025; 978-1-9747-5845-6
179. "Trust"; 180. "Sorry 'Bout This" (悪ぃな, Warii na); 181. "One Minute" (一分, Ichibun); 182. "Sunspot" (黒点(サンスポット), Sansupotto); 183. "The Three of Us" (3人で, Sannin de); 184. "Bankara" (バンカラ); 185. "Eat Up" (おあがりよ, O Agari yo); 186. "Senpen Banka" (千変番華); 187. "Soul Boost" (魂再生(ソウルブースト), Sōru Būsuto)
22	Beast	August 2, 2024; 978-4-08-884130-4	November 18, 2025; 978-1-9747-5908-8
188. "Same Undying Person" (同じ不死(ひと), Onaji Hito); 189. "Julia" (ジュリア, Juria); 190. "The Person I Admire" (憧れの人, Akogare no Hito); 191. "Top Bull Sparx" (死守, Shishu); 192. "Survival of the Fittest"; 193. "Unstoppable vs. Unluck" (不停止vs不運(アンストッパブルアンラック), Ansutoppaburu Anrakku); 194. "Beast"; 195. "On Your Mark!!"; 196. "Set!!!"
23	Language	October 4, 2024; 978-4-08-884208-0	January 20, 2026; 978-1-9747-6108-1
197. "Ready!!!"; 198. "Go!!!!"; 199. "Strategy"; 200. "Language"; 201. "Deadly Rule Shiritori" (死理取り, Shiritori); 202. "Clouds Part, Dragon Appears" (雲蒸竜変, Unjō Ryū-hen); 203. "Sound Mind, Strong Body" (文武両道, Bunburyōdō); 204. "Feeling Indelible, Words Unforgettable" (得意不忘言, Tokui Fubōgen); 205. "Old Plans, New Ideas" (覧古考新, Ranko Kōshin)
24	Promise; Yakusoku (約束)	January 4, 2025; 978-4-08-884390-2	March 17, 2026; 978-1-9747-6109-8
206. "Engage"; 207. "One More Time" (もう一度, Mōichido); 208. "Could It Be" (もしかして, Moshikashite); 209. "Shove it" (クソ喰らえ, Kuso Kurae); 210. "Unison"; 211. "Unchaste"; 212. "Live @ Live"; 213. "Recollection"; 214. "Promise" (約束, Yakusoku)
25	Ragnar0k	February 4, 2025; 978-4-08-884393-3	June 16, 2026; 978-1-9747-6110-4
215. "Rehearsal"; 216. "Expression" (発言-expression-, Hatsugen -Ikusupuresshon-); 217. "Touch On Now"; 218. "Dead Start" (死動, Shidō); 219. "Welcome Back" (おかえり, Okaeri); 220. "Now, C'mon" (さぁ, Saa); 221. "Bad Loop" (凶界輪廻(バッドループ), Baddo Rūpu); 222. "Speedrun" (RTA(リアルタイムアッタック), Riaru Taimu Attakku); 223. "Ragnar0k"
26	Re member	April 4, 2025; 978-4-08-884411-4	August 18, 2026; 978-1-9747-6508-9
224. "Good Luck" (ご武運を(グッドラック), Guddo Rakku); 225. "I Want to Get to Know" (知りたい, Shiritai); 226. "Apocalypse" (黙示録(アポカリプス), Apokaripusu); 227. "I'm for Either-Or!" (アタシはどっちも!, Atashi wa Dotchi Mo!); 228. "Strength Is About" (武(つよさ)とは, Tsuyosa to wa); 229. "Re-Return"; 230. "Undead Unjustice" (不死不正義(アンデッドアンジャスティス), Andeddo Anjasutisu); 231. "Re member" 232. "Assault"
27	Deadluck; Deddorakku (死と運(デッドラック))	April 4, 2025; 978-4-08-884412-1	October 20, 2026; 978-1-9747-6532-4
233. "Easter Egg"; 234. "Know All Along"; 235. "The Rules of Man" (人の理(ルール), Hito no Rūru); 236. "Heart" (心, Kokoro); 237. "Game Cleared"; 238. "01"; 239. "Deadluck" (死と運(デッドラック), Deddorakku)
