= Red Cat Ramen =

Japanese manga series

- First tankōbon volume cover, featuring Bunzo

ラーメン赤猫 (Ramen Aka Neko)
- Genre: Cooking; Comedy; Slice of life
- Manga
- Written by: Angyaman
- Published by: Shueisha
- Imprint: Jump Comics+
- Magazine: Shōnen Jump+
- Original run: March 14, 2022 – present
- Volumes: 16
- Anime television series
- Directed by: Hisatoshi Shimizu
- Written by: Toru Kubo
- Music by: Hirotaka Matsuoka
- Studio: E&H Production
- Licensed by: Crunchyroll: SEA: Medialink
- Original network: JNN (TBS)
- Original run: July 4, 2024 – September 19, 2024
- Episodes: 12 (38 segments)
- Anime television series

Red Cat Ramen Part 2
- Directed by: Hisatoshi Shimizu
- Written by: Shigeru Murakoshi
- Music by: Hirotaka Matsuoka
- Studio: E&H Production
- Original network: TXN (TV Tokyo)
- Original run: January 2027 – present
- icon

Red Cat Ramen (Japanese: ラーメン赤猫, Hepburn: Ramen Aka Neko) is a Japanese manga series written and illustrated by Angyaman. It began serialization as an independent comic published on Shueisha's Shōnen Jump+ app and website in March 2022. It later became a full-fledged series in October 2022. An anime television series adaptation produced by E&H Production aired from July to September 2024. A second season is set to premiere in January 2027.

== Plot ==
Red Cat Ramen centers around the titular establishment, a ramen shop established and run by talking cats. Focusing on Tamako Yashiro, a human woman who is working as a part-timer behind the scenes, the series focuses on the day-to-day antics of her and her fellow feline employees: Bunzo, the head chef; Sasaki, the owner and finance/business expert; Sabu, the sous-chef; Hana, the customer service manager; and Krishna, a tiger in charge of making the base ramen noodles in-house.

== Characters ==
=== Main characters ===
The main characters, clockwise from top-left: Hana, Krishna, Tamako, Sabu, Bunzo and Sasaki, with Jewel in the center

Bunzo (文蔵, Bunzō)
Voiced by: Kenjiro Tsuda
An orange tabby cat and the softspoken head chef at Red Cat Ramen. He was originally a stray before being rescued by the old owner of a ramen food cart. After the owner retired to a nursing home, Bunzo took over the business for him. He then eventually partnered with Sasaki to upgrade his food cart into a full restaurant.
Pudding Sasaki (佐々木 プリン, Sasaki Purin)
Voiced by: Noriaki Sugiyama
A grey tuxedo cat and the laidback owner of Red Cat Ramen. He primarily manages the business' finances and office work, but often helps out his staff by serving customers. Like Bunzo, Sasaki was also a stray before being adopted by a wealthy businesswoman. When his owner became terminally ill, he acted as her caretaker until her death. He then received a large inheritance, using it to open the restaurant.
Sabu (サブ)
Voiced by: Michiyo Murase
A black cat and the cheerful sous-chef at Red Cat Ramen. He is responsible for cooking side dishes, such as gyōza, and plating ramen. Sabu grew up as a stray in Chinatown before being scouted by Bunzo. As a result of his upbringing, he is very food-motivated. Outside of work, he is an avid PC gamer who is skilled enough to compete in online tournaments against human players.
Hana (ハナ)
Voiced by: Rie Kugimiya
A white cat and the customer service manager at Red Cat Ramen. While she puts on a cute, bubbly persona for her guests, her real personality is more sassy and tsundere. Prior to joining Red Cat, she worked as an idol under the handle Love Pipi. She became the center of an animal abuse scandal after she willingly had her ear pierced, resulting in her leaving show business due to the harassment her owner faced from the incident.
Krishna (クリシュナ, Kurishuna)
Voiced by: Saori Hayami
A tiger and the timid noodle-maker at Red Cat Ramen. The offspring of a Siberian tiger and Bengal tiger, Krishna was born and raised in a zoo before being recruited by Bunzo. Her imposing size sharply contrasts her shy and kindhearted nature. While she normally stays in the back of house, she is sometimes brought out front to scare away unruly customers.
Tamako Yashiro (社 珠子, Yashiro Tamako)
Voiced by: Kurumi Orihara
The sole human employee at Red Cat Ramen. Her main responsibilities are washing dishes and brushing the other staff members. During service, she wears a kuroko outfit to blend into the background. Tamako left her former career at an advertising design company due to the toxic work environment. She admits to being more of a dog person than a cat person, which helps her land the job at Red Cat.
Jewel (ジュエル, Jueru)
Voiced by: Tasuku Hatanaka
A grey long-haired cat and a customer service specialist at Red Cat Ramen. He is flashy and charismatic, often striking a pose whenever he introduces himself and handing out his personal business cards. Jewel first joins Red Cat with the dream of owning his own feline host club, in the hopes of finding the host who cared for him as a kitten before disappearing. After Sasaki locates the host and reunites the two, Jewel takes on a new goal of traveling to Italy to teach other cats about hospitality.
Yuzu Yamasato (山郷 ゆず, Yamasato Yuzu)
A Siamese cat and trainee at Red Cat Ramen. Recognized for her intelligence, Yuzu also possesses a reserved and fiercely independent personality, which initially causes her to keep her distance from her coworkers and struggle with the customer service aspects of the job. She eventually warms up to the others and finds a suitable spot manning the register. She previously worked at a government-affiliated charity, albeit acting mostly as their unofficial mascot.

=== Recurring characters ===
Ushimitsumaru (丑満丸)
A mysterious, black long-haired cat and "master ninja" who trained Red Cat Ramen's feline staff in his secret technique of not shedding fur, thus allowing them to work in the restaurant industry. He is owned by Teru Tajima (但馬 照, Tajima Teru), a former restaurant proprietress who supplies menma to Red Cat.
Tetra (テトラ, Tetora)
A Sphynx cat and former employee at Red Cat Ramen. She agreed to help during Red Cat's opening period as a favor to her close friend Sasaki. While adored by customers, Tetra was notoriously unreliable, constantly forgetting people's orders and napping on the job. After quitting, she often travels overseas with her owner Taichiro Ishigami (石上 太一朗, Ishigami Taichiro).
Buono (ボノ, Bono)
A cat from Italy and Jewel's apprentice. He works at the restaurant Il Miagolio, owned by three-star chef Pietro Romário and his granddaughter Emma, where he serves and entertains patrons; however, his true passion lies in the kitchen. After Jewel returns to Japan following a failed kidnapping attempt against him, which results in Il Miagolio's temporary closure, Buono decides to join Red Cat Ramen as a new part-timer.

== Media ==
=== Manga ===
Written and illustrated by Angyaman, Red Cat Ramen was originally published on Shueisha's Jump Rookie website from November 26, 2021, to February 20, 2022. It later began serialization as an independent comic published on Shueisha's Shōnen Jump+ app and website on March 14, 2022. It later got promoted to a regular serialization on October 2, 2022. Its chapters have been collected in sixteen volumes as of November 2026.

The series is published digitally in English on Shueisha's Manga Plus platform. The series is also published in France by Kurokawa.

Red Cat Ramen collections
No.	Release date	ISBN
1	October 4, 2022	978-4-08-883279-1
2	December 4, 2022	978-4-08-883398-9
3	February 3, 2023	978-4-08-883402-3
4	June 2, 2023	978-4-08-883619-5
5	September 4, 2023	978-4-08-883713-0
6	December 4, 2023	978-4-08-883811-3
7	March 4, 2024	978-4-08-883859-5
8	July 4, 2024	978-4-08-884056-7
9	October 4, 2024	978-4-08-884244-8
10	February 4, 2025	978-4-08-884430-5
11	June 4, 2025	978-4-08-884542-5
12	September 4, 2025	978-4-08-884670-5
13	December 4, 2025	978-4-08-884826-6
14	April 3, 2026	978-4-08-885022-1
15	July 3, 2026	978-4-08-885169-3
16	November 4, 2026	978-4-08-885218-8

=== Anime ===
An anime adaptation was announced on November 27, 2023. It was later confirmed at Jump Festa 2024 to be a television series produced by E&H Production with general production by Good Smile Company, directed by Hisatoshi Shimizu, with Toru Kubo overseeing series scripts, Michinori Chiba designing the characters, and Hirotaka Matsuoka composing the music. The series aired from July 4 to September 19, 2024, on TBS and its affiliates. The opening theme song is "Akaneko" (赤猫; lit. 'Red Cat') performed by Wednesday Campanella, while the ending theme song is "Honjitsu no Osusume" (本日のおすすめ; lit. 'Today's Recommendation') performed by Rikon Densetsu. Crunchyroll licensed the series. Medialink licensed the series for streaming in Southeast Asia and Oceania (except Australia, New Zealand and Vietnam) on its Ani-One Asia YouTube channel.

A second season was announced at Jump Festa 2025 on December 21, 2024. Titled as Red Cat Ramen Part 2 (ラーメン赤猫 其の二, Rāmen aka Neko sono ni), the cast and staff are reprising their roles, with Shigeru Murakoshi replacing Kubo as series scriptwriter. It is set to premiere in January 2027 on TV Tokyo and its affiliates.

==== Episodes ====
No.	Title	Directed by (Note: Production staff information is taken from the ending credits of each episode.)	Storyboarded by	Animation directed by	Original release date
1	"A Closed-Door Hire"; Transliteration: "Hikōkaikyūjin" (Japanese: ⾮公開求⼈)	Hisatoshi Shimizu	Hisatoshi Shimizu	Michinori Chiba & Masataka Akai	July 4, 2024
1	"The Athletic Black Cat"; Transliteration: "Kuroneko Asurechikku" (Japanese: 黒猫アスレチック)	Hisatoshi Shimizu	Hisatoshi Shimizu	Yumiko Hara, Miyako Nishida & Jōji Yanase	July 4, 2024
2	"Hana-chan's Professionalism"; Transliteration: "Hana-chan no Puro Ishiki" (Japanese: ハナちゃんのプロ意識)	Kōki Aoshima	Kōki Aoshima	Shiori Hosaka & Min Hui	July 11, 2024
2	"The Tiger in the Noodle Room"; Transliteration: "Seimenshitsu no Tora" (Japanese: 製麺室の虎)	Kōki Aoshima	Hisatoshi Shimizu	Azuma Tozawa	July 11, 2024
3	"Nothing Wrong With That"; Transliteration: "Ijan" (Japanese: いいじゃん)	Chie Nishizawa	Chie Nishizawa	Chie Nishizawa	July 18, 2024
3	"Service First"; Transliteration: "Sekkyaku Ichiban" (Japanese: 接客⼀番)	Masataka Akai	Hisatoshi Shimizu	Masataka Akai	July 18, 2024
3	"The Masked Handyman"; Transliteration: "Masukudo Enjinia" (Japanese: マスクドエンジニア)	Takayuki Sano	Hisatoshi Shimizu	Takayuki Sano	July 18, 2024
4	"The Fluffy Tiger"; Transliteration: "Funwari Taigā" (Japanese: ふんわりタイガー)	Hisatoshi Shimizu & Chie Nishizawa	Hisatoshi Shimizu	Chie Nishizawa	July 26, 2024 (Note: This episode aired at 12:06 a.m. JST, 10 minutes delayed from its original air time on Japan News Network.)
4	"Tiger Paw-Made Noodles"; Transliteration: "Tora Uchi Men" (Japanese: ⻁打麺)	Hisatoshi Shimizu & Chie Nishizawa	Hisatoshi Shimizu	Takayuki Sano	July 26, 2024
4	"The Late-Night Cat"; Transliteration: "Yoru Fukashi Neko" (Japanese: 夜更かし猫)	Hisatoshi Shimizu & Chie Nishizawa	Hisatoshi Shimizu	Mariko Takeda, Min Hui & Tsutomu Ono	July 26, 2024
4	"A Story Just a While Ago..."; Transliteration: "Chotto Mae no Ohanashi" (Japanese: ちょっと前のお話)	Hisatoshi Shimizu & Chie Nishizawa	Hisatoshi Shimizu	Tow Nakazaki	July 26, 2024
5	"Brushing Makes a Cat Talkative"; Transliteration: "Burashi wa Neko o Jōzetsu ni Suru" (Japanese: ブラシは猫を饒⾆にする)	Kōki Aoshima	Kōki Aoshima	Toyohiro Okada & Shiori Hosaka	August 2, 2024
5	"The Calm Superior"; Transliteration: "Senpai Kaze wa Nagi" (Japanese: 先輩⾵は凪)	Kōki Aoshima	Kōki Aoshima	Tow Nakazaki	August 2, 2024
5	"Way To Go!"; Transliteration: "Yaru Jā〜n" (Japanese: やるじゃぁ〜ん)	Kōki Aoshima	Hisatoshi Shimizu	Maho Takahashi & Takayuki Sano	August 2, 2024
6	"Intrigued"; Transliteration: "Ki ni Naru" (Japanese: 気になる)	Ayumu Ono	Hisatoshi Shimizu	Michinori Chiba	August 9, 2024
6	"I Want to Know"; Transliteration: "Ki ni Nacchau" (Japanese: 気になっちゃう)	Ayumu Ono	Kōki Aoshima	Maho Takahashi & Kazuya Saito	August 9, 2024
6	"To Blend and Blend In"; Transliteration: "Najimi Najimu" (Japanese: なじみなじむ)	Ayumu Ono	Yann Le Gall	Jōji Yanase & Momo Amai	August 9, 2024
7	"Tough Love"; Transliteration: "Kyūchi no Oni" (Japanese: 旧知の鬼)	Saki Fujishiro	Chie Nishizawa	Min-Gi Han & Maho Takahashi	August 15, 2024
7	"Today's Reflection"; Transliteration: "Kyō no Kyōzō" (Japanese: 今日の鏡像)	Saki Fujishiro	Chie Nishizawa	Tow Nakazaki	August 15, 2024
7	"Ambition and Animals"; Transliteration: "Yabō to Kemono" (Japanese: 野望と獣)	Saki Fujishiro	Hisatoshi Shimizu	Hea Jung, Sung Seung Taek, Eunhee John, Park Eli & Han Sung Hui	August 15, 2024
8	"All Ages Welcome"; Transliteration: "Okyakusama ni Nenrei Seigen Nashi" (Japanese: お客様に年齢制限なし)	Chie Nishizawa	Chie Nishizawa	Chie Nishizawa	August 22, 2024
8	"A Highly-Rated Brushing"; Transliteration: "Kō Hyōka Burasshingu" (Japanese: 高評価ブラッシング)	Chie Nishizawa	Hisatoshi Shimizu	Shiori Hosaka & Toyohiro Okada	August 22, 2024
8	"Crazy About Ramen"; Transliteration: "Rāmen Baka" (Japanese: ラーメンバカ)	Chie Nishizawa	Hisatoshi Shimizu	Tow Nakazaki & Momo Amai	August 22, 2024
9	"The Case of the Missing Confit"; Transliteration: "Kieta Konfi Jiken" (Japanese: 消えたコンフィ事件)	Saki Fujishiro	Hiroshi Kōjina	Chie Nishizawa, Mariko Takeda & Amai Momo	August 29, 2024
9	"Unable to Learn From The Tiger's Might"; Transliteration: "Tora no I Manabezu" (Japanese: 虎の威学べず)	Saki Fujishiro	Hisatoshi Shimizu	Tow Nakazaki & Maho Takahashi	August 29, 2024
9	"It's Not Really a Secret"; Transliteration: "Himitsu Demo Naikedo" (Japanese: ヒミツでもないけど)	Saki Fujishiro	Hisatoshi Shimizu	Jan Vegricht, Im Ji-hyun, Sung Seung Taek & Minki Han	August 29, 2024
10	"Heart Heart"; Transliteration: "Hāto Hāto" (Japanese: ハートハート)	Kōki Aoshima	Kōki Aoshima	Sunghoo Park, Masataka Akai & Chie Nishizawa	September 5, 2024
10	"Lovely Pipi-chan"; Transliteration: "Raburī Pipi-chan" (Japanese: ラブリーぴぴちゃん)	Kōki Aoshima	Kōki Aoshima	Tow Nakazaki, Kazuya Saito, Tsutomu Ono & Kwtm	September 5, 2024
10	"Work"; Transliteration: "Oshigoto" (Japanese: おしごと)	Kōki Aoshima	Hisatoshi Shimizu	Asumi Katō, Amai Momo, Puk & Tegaray Galiano González	September 5, 2024
11	"Vague Memories"; Transliteration: "Ayafuyana Kioku no Hanashi" (Japanese: あやふやな記憶の話)	Hisatoshi Shimizu	Hisatoshi Shimizu	Chie Nishizawa, Mariko Takeda, Toyohiro Okada, Momo Amai, Min-Gi Han & Shiori Hosaka	September 12, 2024
11	"It Depends on the Cat"; Transliteration: "Neko Niyoru" (Japanese: ねこによる)	Hisatoshi Shimizu	Hisatoshi Shimizu	Tow Nakazaki	September 12, 2024
11	"My Specialty"; Transliteration: "Tokuina Shigoto" (Japanese: とくいな仕事)	Hisatoshi Shimizu	Yui Miura	Im Ji-hyun, Goyeja & Sung Seung Taek	September 12, 2024
12	"Choose the Team!"	Kōki Aoshima	Kōki Aoshima	Chie Nishizawa	September 19, 2024
12	"As Always, Thanks for Coming!"; Transliteration: "Itsumo Go-raiten Arigatōgozaimasu" (Japanese: いつもご来店ありがとうございます)	Kōki Aoshima	Yui Miura	Mariko Takeda, Maho Takahashi & Amai Momo	September 19, 2024
12	"Congratulations"; Transliteration: "Omedetō" (Japanese: おめでとう)	Kōki Aoshima	Hisatoshi Shimizu	Tsutomu Ōno & Tow Nakazaki	September 19, 2024

=== Game ===
On July 1, 2024, a licensed game, Ramen Akaneko ~ A Lovely Ramen Shop (ラーメン赤猫 ～ニャンて素敵なラーメン店～, Rāmen Aka Neko ~ Nyante Sutekina Rāmen-ten), was announced for Android and iOS phones. The game will have animated cutscenes for the game and new lines recorded by the cast.

=== Radio show ===
On June 7, 2024, a web radio show, Ramen Akaneko: A Lovely In-Store Announcement (ラーメン赤猫 ニャンて素敵な店内放送, Rāmen Aka Neko Nyante Sutekina Ten'nai Hōsō), began streaming online through Good Smile Company's YouTube channel. Kurumi Orihara, who plays Tamako Yashiro in the anime, serves as the host.

== Reception ==
The series was nominated for the eighth Next Manga Awards in 2022 for the web manga category and was ranked fifth out of 50 nominees. The series was also ranked fifteenth in the Nationwide Bookstore Employees' Recommended Comics of 2023. It ranked nineteenth on Takarajimasha's Kono Manga ga Sugoi! list of best manga of 2024 for male readers.
