= Death Stranding Isolations =

Upcoming animated streaming series

- Promotional poster

Japanese name
- Katakana: デス・ストランディング アイソレーション
Transcriptions
- Revised Hepburn: Desu Sutorandingu Aisorēshon
- Based on: Death Stranding by Hideo Kojima
- Written by: Tow Ubukata
- Directed by: Takayuki Sano
- Country of origin: Japan

Production
- Executive producer: Hideo Kojima
- Production companies: Kojima Productions; E&H Production

Original release
- Network: Disney+

Death Stranding Isolations (Japanese: デス・ストランディング アイソレーション, Hepburn: Desu Sutorandingu Aisorēshon) is an upcoming Japanese anime original net animation series set in the world of the 2019 video game Death Stranding. It is directed by Takayuki Sano, with animation by E&H Production and Hideo Kojima serving as executive producer. Tow Ubukata is credited with series composition and the screenplay. The series is scheduled to stream on Hulu on Disney+ in 2027. Unlike the video game, it centres on other people living in the same fictional setting.

== Premise ==
The story takes place in North America following the events of the Death Stranding, in which contact between the dead and the living causes catastrophic explosions. It concerns people who have responded to the collapse of society by living apart from one another. The narrative is set shortly after the video game's protagonist, Sam Bridges, reconnects the continent through the Chiral Network.

One of the characters is a girl who comes to prefer living alone, until encounters with other people disrupt her isolation. Other figures described in the series' synopsis include an older man who seeks a different means of connecting people, a female soldier involved in continuing conflict and a boy who resents his circumstances.

== Production ==
In May 2025, Kojima stated that an anime adaptation of Death Stranding was being developed, without identifying its title or staff. Death Stranding Isolations was announced in November 2025 at a Disney+ originals presentation held at Hong Kong Disneyland. Kojima and Sano appeared at the event, where concept artwork by Ilya Kuvshinov was shown. Sano was named as director, Kojima as executive producer and Kuvshinov as the original character designer. The project uses hand-drawn 2d animation by E&H Production.

== Release ==
On 30 October 2026, Kojima Productions unveiled a teaser trailer and additional story details, and confirmed Ubukata's involvement as the writer responsible for series composition and screenplay. The series is scheduled for a 2027 release on Disney+ on Hulu.
