= E&H Production =

Japanese animation studio

E&H Production Co., Ltd.
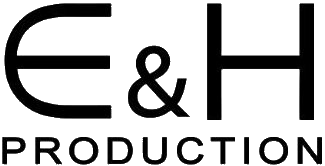
- Native name: 株式会社E&H production
- Type: Kabushiki gaisha
- Founded: March 2021; 5 years ago
- Founder: Sunghoo Park
- Headquarters: Honchō, Nakano, Tokyo, Japan
- Key people: Sunghoo Park (President & CEO)
- Services: Animation
- Number of employees: 67
- Website: https://e-h-pro.co.jp/

E&H Production Co., Ltd. (株式会社E&H production) is a Japanese animation studio founded in March 2021 by former MAPPA director and animator Sunghoo Park.

== History ==
Founded in March 2021 by Sunghoo Park, who worked at MAPPA as director for the series Garo: Vanishing Line, The God of High School, Jujutsu Kaisen, and the Jujutsu Kaisen 0 film. Its main headquarters is located in Nakano, Tokyo.

E&H is an acronym for "Entertain & Human".

E&H Production aims to produce original animated products, as well as innovate with new animation processes and styles. The studio also aims to work on game engines, virtual reality, and shooter video games.

Its first work in the main production studio is the original anime television series Ninja Kamui.

== Productions ==
=== Anime television series ===
Year	Title	Director	Source	Eps.	Network	Refs.
2024	Ninja Kamui	Sunghoo Park	Original work	13	Adult Swim (US)	
2024	Red Cat Ramen	Hisatoshi Shimizu	Manga	12	TBS	
2026	Magic Knight Rayearth	Yui Miura	Manga	TBA	TV Asahi	

=== Specials ===
Year	Title	Director	Source	Network	Refs.
2025	Undead Unluck: Winter Arc	Sunghoo Park	Manga	MBS, TBS	

=== Original net animations ===
Year	Title	Director	Source	Eps.	Refs.
2024	Monsters: 103 Mercies Dragon Damnation	Sunghoo Park	Manga	1	
2025	Bullet/Bullet	Sunghoo Park	Original work	12	
2027	Death Stranding: Isolations	Takayuki Sano	Video game	TBA	
