= Monsters (manga) =

Japanese one-shot manga

- Key visual of the anime adaptation
- Genre: Action; Fantasy
- Manga
- Written by: Eiichiro Oda
- Published by: Shueisha
- English publisher: NA: Viz Media
- Magazine: Weekly Shōnen Jump Autumn Special
- Published: October 30, 1994
- Original net animation

Monsters: 103 Mercies Dragon Damnation
- Directed by: Sunghoo Park
- Written by: Sunghoo Park
- Music by: Hiroaki Tsutsumi
- Studio: E&H Production
- Licensed by: Netflix: SA/SEA: Medialink
- Released: January 21, 2024
- Runtime: 25 minutes
- icon

Monsters (stylized in all caps) is a Japanese one-shot manga written and illustrated by Eiichiro Oda. It was published by Shueisha in the Autumn Special issue of Weekly Shōnen Jump in October 1994. An original net animation (ONA) adaptation, titled Monsters: 103 Mercies Dragon Damnation, was produced by E&H Production and premiered on Netflix in January 2024. Oda would feature characters from Monsters in his subsequent manga series One Piece, setting the two in the same universe.

== Characters ==
Ryuma de King (リューマ・ド・キング, Ryuma do Kingu) / Shimotsuki Ryuma (霜月リューマ, Shimotsuki Ryūma)
Voiced by: Yoshimasa Hosoya (vomic and ONA) (Japanese); Robbie Daymond (English)
A wandering samurai who holds the title as the strongest swordsman. By the events of One Piece, his corpse and sword are stolen by Gecko Moria to serve him on Thriller Bark. He ultimately entrusts his sword to Roronoa Zoro.
Flare (フレア, Furea)
Voiced by: Maaya Sakamoto (vomic), Kana Hanazawa (ONA) (Japanese); Brianna Knickerbocker (English)
A young woman working as a waitress at a bar in a small town. She was the sole survivor of a dragon attack that destroyed her village, leading her to respect Cyrano who she falsely believed to be her savior.
Cyrano (シラノ, Shirano)
Voiced by: Hōchū Ōtsuka (vomic), Hiroki Tōchi (ONA) (Japanese); Ray Chase (English)
A master swordsman second to King, the strongest swordsman. He is in fact a thief who orchestrated the Great Disaster seven years ago that left Flare the only survivor of her village.
D.R. (ディーアールの, Dīāruno)
Voiced by: Yoshitsugu Matsuoka (vomic), Mitsuaki Madono (ONA) (Japanese); Kyle McCarley (English)
A thief in town who frames Ryuma for stabbing him. He is in fact a cohort of Cyrano who framed Ryuma.
Restaurant Owner (マスター, Masutā)
Voiced by: Takuma Terashima (vomic), Katsuhito Nomura (ONA) (Japanese); Kyle McCarley (English)
The master and bartender of the cafe that Flare works at.
Roronoa Zoro (ロロノア・ゾロ, Roronoa Zoro)
Voiced by: Kazuya Nakai (Japanese); Christopher Sabat (English)
A central character of One Piece who inherits Ryuma's sword on Thriller Bark in the future.

== Media ==
=== Manga ===
Written and illustrated by Eiichiro Oda, the Monsters one-shot was published by Shueisha in 1994 in the Autumn Special issue of Weekly Shōnen Jump (cover dated October 30). The chapter was collected in Oda's short stories volume Wanted!, released on November 4, 1998. The character Ryuma would later appear as a zombie in Oda's One Piece manga series during the Thriller Bark story arc, thus officially linking the events of both works.

Viz Media published the one-shot digitally on January 22, 2024, and published the Wanted! volume (under the title Wanted! Eiichiro Oda Before One Piece) on November 12 of the same year.

=== Original net animation ===
In July 2023, it was announced that Monsters would be receiving an anime adaptation. Titled Monsters: 103 Mercies Dragon Damnation (MONSTERS 一百三情飛龍侍極, Monsutāzu: Ippaku Sanjō Hiryū Jigoku), the original net animation (ONA) premiered worldwide on Netflix on January 21, 2024, and January 23 in Japan. (Note: Premiered on January 22 at midnight JST, which is effectively January 23.) Medialink sub-licensed the ONA in Asia-Pacific for streaming on their Ani-One Asia YouTube channel.

The ONA was directed by Sunghoo Park, who was also in charge of composition, and animated by his studio E&H Production. Takashi Kojima served as character designer, with Fuminao Akai as art director, Ryoji Nagasawa as color designer, Lee Ju-Mi as director of photography, Keisuke Yanagi as editor, and Akiko Fujita as sound director. The music was composed by Hiroaki Tsutsumi and produced by Takeki Kobayashi.
