= Death Stranding =

2019 video game

- Developer: Kojima Productions (Note: Additional work by Guerrilla Games)
- Publishers: Sony Interactive Entertainment (Note: Publishes the PlayStation 4 and PlayStations 5 versions); 505 Games (Note: Publishes the Windows, iOS, iPadOS, macOS, Luna, and the Xbox Series X/S versions)
- Director: Hideo Kojima
- Producers: Hideo Kojima; Kenichiro Imaizumi; James Vance; Ken Mendoza
- Designer: Hideo Kojima
- Programmer: Akio Sakamoto
- Artist: Yoji Shinkawa
- Writers: Hideo Kojima; Kenji Yano; Shuyo Murata
- Composer: Ludvig Forssell
- Engine: Decima
- Platforms: PlayStation 4; Windows; PlayStation 5; iOS; iPadOS; macOS; Amazon Luna; Xbox Series X/S
- Release: November 8, 2019: PlayStation 4; November 8, 2019; Windows; July 14, 2020; Director's Cut; PlayStation 5; September 24, 2021; Windows; March 30, 2022; iOS, iPadOS, macOS; January 30, 2024; Luna, Xbox Series X/S; November 7, 2024
- Genre: Action-adventure
- Mode: Single-player

Death Stranding is a 2019 action-adventure game developed by Kojima Productions and published by Sony Interactive Entertainment. It is co-written, co-produced, designed, and directed by Hideo Kojima, and is the first game from Kojima after his departure from Konami in 2015. It was first released for PlayStation 4 in November 2019, followed by a Windows port in July 2020. A director's cut was released for PlayStation 5 in September 2021, followed by releases for Windows in March 2022, iOS, iPadOS and macOS in January 2024, and Amazon Luna and Xbox Series X/S in November 2024. Sony published the game on their consoles, while 505 Games published all other versions.

The game is set in the United States following a cataclysmic event which caused destructive creatures to begin roaming the Earth. The player controls Sam Porter Bridges (Norman Reedus), a courier tasked with delivering supplies to isolated colonies and reconnecting them via a wireless communications network. However, he is pursued by a genocidal militia group, led by a mysterious masked man known as Higgs, who intends to wipe out the remainder of humanity. Alongside Reedus, the game features actors Mads Mikkelsen, Léa Seydoux, Margaret Qualley, Troy Baker, Tommie Earl Jenkins, and Lindsay Wagner, in addition to the likenesses of film directors Guillermo del Toro and Nicolas Winding Refn, as supporting characters.

Death Stranding received generally positive reviews. Critics praised its voice acting, soundtrack, and visuals, with more mixed opinions regarding its gameplay and story. The game was nominated for several awards and won the most GOTY awards of any game in 2019. As of March 2021, the game had sold 5 million copies worldwide. Numerous commentators later noted that elements of the game resembled the COVID-19 pandemic, which began during the months following its original release.

A sequel, Death Stranding 2: On the Beach, released on June 26, 2025, for PlayStation 5. Two film adaptations and a television series are concurrently in development.

== Gameplay ==
Pre-release gameplay screenshot of Death Stranding, taken from a trailer shown at E3 2018. Sam, the protagonist, uses an "odradek" to uncover several invisible enemies in order to sneak past them.

Death Stranding is an action-adventure game set in an open world, and includes asynchronous online functions. Kojima refers to Death Stranding as the first "strand game", an original genre characterized by the game's incorporation of social elements. Kojima compared this genre to how his earlier game Metal Gear—now considered a stealth game—was called an action game during its release because the stealth genre had not been established.

The player controls Sam Bridges, a porter for a company known as Bridges. The player is tasked with delivering supply cargo to various isolated cities known as Knots, as well as isolated researchers and survivalists, while also connecting them to a communications system known as the Chiral Network. The player is evaluated by the company and recipients based on their performance (including via "likes" similar to social networks), including whether the cargo was delivered, and if it is intact, among other factors. These merits are, in turn, used to level up the player's statistics, such as stability and weight capacity, and increase their standing with individual locations and characters (which can improve rewards). How cargo is packed by the player, and the overall weight being carried, affect Sam's ability to navigate through the environments.

The game extensively uses licensed music, most often from the bands Silent Poets and Low Roar, to score and enhance specific set-pieces and moments of traversal. When speaking on the use of music, Kojima said the music "would match this harsh but beautiful and pure environmental setting. I also felt somewhat of a connection to Low Roar and the game, the matching of Low Roar's acoustic but digital futuristic sound and the concept of Death Stranding." After the death of Low Roar's frontman Ryan Karazija in 2022, Kojima said, "Without [Ryan], ... Death Stranding would not have been born."

The player's main enemies include otherworldly creatures known as "beached things" (BTs), MULEs (rogue, bandit-like porters obsessed with cargo, who attempt to steal and deliver it themselves), and Demens, MULEs who have begun killing porters to claim their cargo. BTs are surrounded by a rain known as "timefall", which damages the player's armor and cargo by speeding up their deterioration. BTs are normally invisible, but Sam's suit is equipped with a robotic sensor referred to in-game as an "odradek" that points towards nearby BTs, and the player can then scan the area to reveal them.

As Sam is a "repatriate", he is taken to an underwater world known as the "Seam" if he is killed, where he can "swim" back to his body to revive himself. However, being killed and consumed by a BT results in a destructive explosion known as a "voidout", which permanently damages the location of the death with an untraversable crater.

As the player expands the coverage of the Chiral Network, they can access maps of areas, and use blueprints to produce consumable items and structures with the Portable Chiral Constructor (PCC, a device similar to a 3D printer), including ropes, bridges, and power generators used for charging battery-powered equipment. The Network is used as the basis for the game's online functionality, where players can leave supplies, structures, and messages that can be viewed and used by other players, although structures will eventually be destroyed by Timefall after some time. The player can recover cargo lost by other players to complete their delivery. The player does not directly encounter other players in the world.

== Synopsis ==
=== Setting ===
The game is set in an apocalyptic United States, where a cataclysmic event known as the "Death Stranding" caused "Beached Things" ("BTs")—invisible creatures originating from the "Beach", lands thought to be unique to each person that are typically visited during near-death experiences and are said to be the link to the afterlife—to begin roaming the Earth. BTs are created from the dead via necrosis, and when they consume a living human being, they create an explosion on the scale of a nuclear bomb, known as a "voidout". They produce rain known as "Timefall" that rapidly ages and deteriorates whatever it hits. These events damaged the country's infrastructure, leading its remaining population to confine themselves to remote colonies known as "Knot Cities", which form the remaining "United Cities of America".

These colonies have relied on the services of a company known as Bridges, whose porters brave the BTs, bandits, and terrorists to deliver supplies to the cities. Bridges performs various governmental functions on behalf of the UCA. If they achieve a mental connection to a "Bridge Baby" (a "BB")—a premature child reflecting a state between life and death—it is possible for a person to sense the presence of a BT. Porters carry a BB with them, stored in a pod simulating the womb of a "stillmother". Depending on its severity, a condition known as "DOOMS" allows a person to naturally sense, see, or even control a BT, as well as granting a variety of powers, such as teleportation or travel to other people's Beaches. There are individuals known as "repatriates" who can travel back from "the Seam"—a place between the world of the living and the Beach—upon death. As such, these individuals can effectively return from death, though their deaths will still cause voidouts if killed during contact with a BT.

=== Plot ===
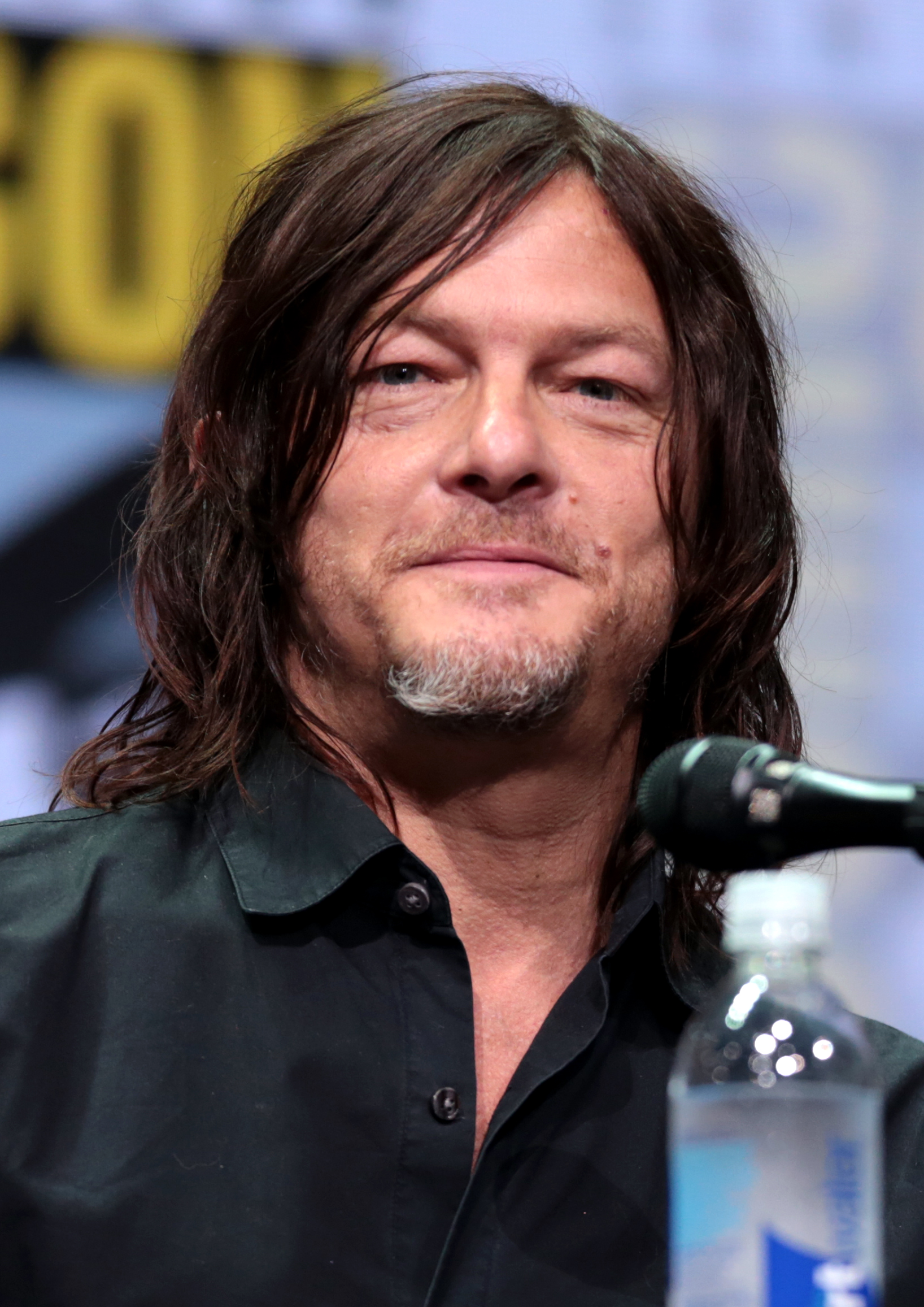
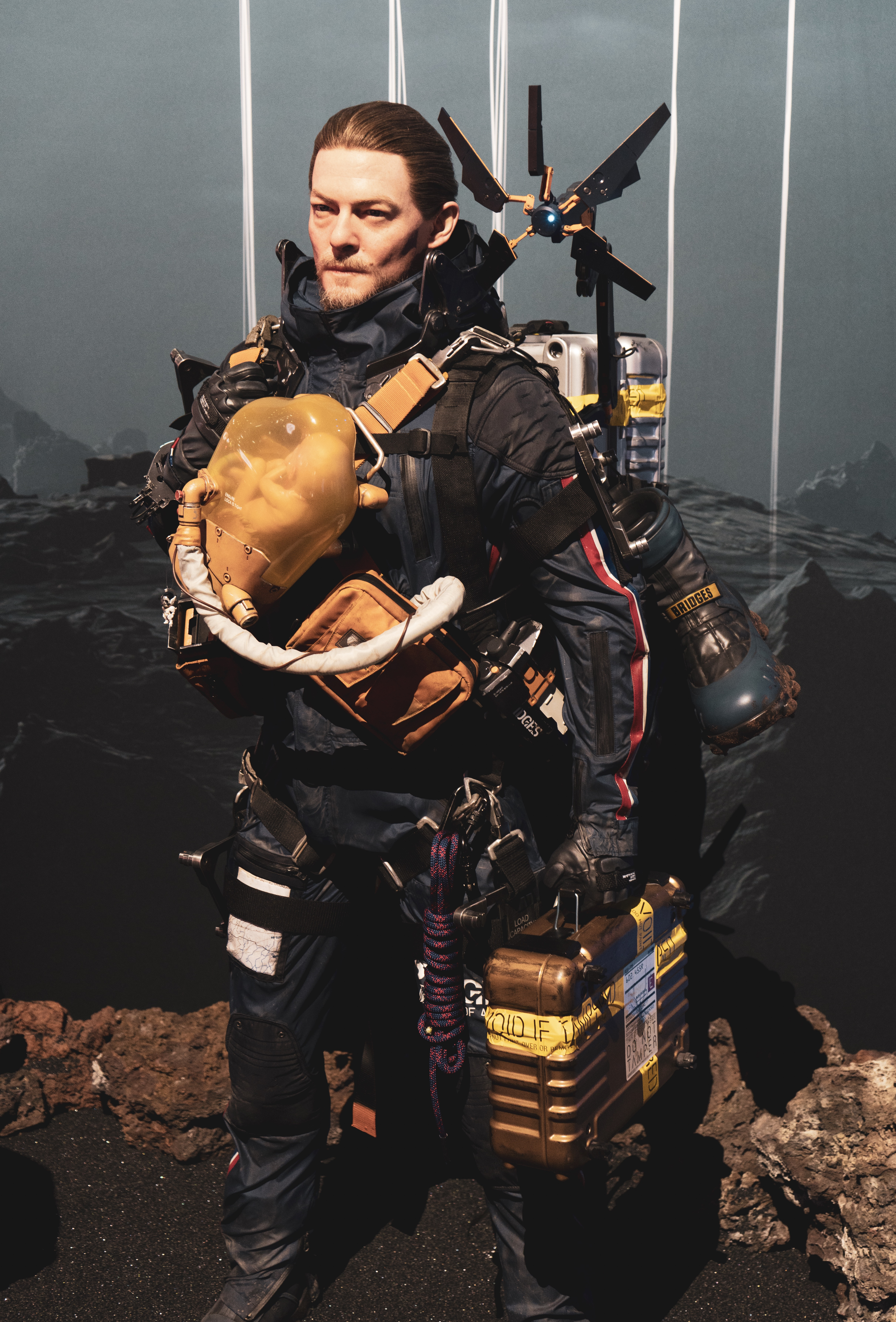
Norman Reedus plays Sam Porter Bridges, the game's protagonist.

Freelance courier Sam Porter Bridges (Norman Reedus) is transporting cargo to Central Knot City but is interrupted by Timefall and takes shelter. He receives assistance from Fragile (Léa Seydoux) in evading a BT. Sam arrives at his destination, where a citizen died by suicide, with the corpse on the verge of necrosis. Due to being both a repatriate and having DOOMS, Sam is given an emergency assignment to accompany the disposal team to an incinerator to dispose of the corpse. However, an encounter with BTs causes a voidout that destroys Central Knot City.

Sam revives in Capital Knot City and meets Deadman (Guillermo del Toro/Jesse Corti), (Note: Del Toro and Refn are the physical models of Deadman and Heartman, who Corti and Jacobs voice.) a doctor from Bridges who has Sam deliver morphine to the dying President of the UCA: Sam's adoptive mother, Bridget Strand (Lindsay Wagner/Emily O'Brien). (Note: Wagner provided the likeness for Bridget and Amelie and voiced the older Bridget; O'Brien voiced the young Bridget and Amelie.) Bridget pleads with Sam to rejoin Bridges and help realize her dream of "reforming America" before succumbing to her illness. Sam takes her body for incineration but refuses to incinerate a Bridge Baby involved in the Central Knot City voidout. With the BB's assistance, Sam evades a horde of BTs and decides to adopt it as his own Bridge Baby; against UCA instructions to treat Bridge Babies as pieces of equipment, Sam gradually forms an emotional bond with it and nicknames it "Lou".

Upon his return to Capital Knot City, Sam receives a message from his estranged sister Amelie Strand (also Wagner/O'Brien). She tells him that over the past three years, she led an expedition across what is left of the contiguous United States, making contact with isolated cities and settlements and setting up terminals that would connect them to the Chiral Network: a system that facilitates instant communication and data transfer across vast distances through the Beach. Upon reaching the last city on the West Coast (Edge Knot City), Amelie was captured by Homo Demens, a terrorist group, to guarantee Edge Knot City's independence. She pleads for Sam to follow her expedition and complete the Chiral Network, thus "reforming America". As this pilgrimage ends at Edge Knot City, Sam can then rescue Amelie, and she can take Bridget's place as the President of the UCA. Sam reluctantly accepts the mission.

Following the instructions of Die-Hardman (Tommie Earl Jenkins), Bridget's personal aide and Director of Bridges, Sam begins his journey from the east to the west coast of North America. Along the way, he delivers valuable cargo to various Knot Cities and settlements; helps research the Death Stranding with Bridges staff such as Mama and her twin sister Lockne (Margaret Qualley) and Heartman (Nicolas Winding Refn/Darren Jacobs); and thwarts deadly plots by terrorists and their leader, Higgs Monaghan (Troy Baker). While connected to Lou, he experiences memories depicting Clifford Unger (Mads Mikkelsen) and his hospitalized wife and BB child. Occasionally, he is pulled into Clifford's Beach; there, he fights a BT manifestation of Clifford, who seeks his lost BB.

After reaching Edge Knot City, Sam fights and defeats Higgs at Amelie's Beach. Higgs reveals that Amelie is an Extinction Entity: a godlike being manifested by the universe to trigger mass extinction events. Amelie is revealed as the true leader of Homo Demens, having conceived the Chiral Network to enable the Last Stranding, the end of life on Earth. It is revealed that Amelie and Bridget are the same person; Bridget's soul separated from her body during early experiments into the Beaches and used the alias "Amelie" as a cover. Amelie is conflicted over her cosmological duties, finding the Last Stranding more humane than perpetual cycles of growth and extinction.

With the help of allies made on his journey, Sam reaches Amelie and convinces her to delay the Last Stranding. Moved, she accepts but must separate herself and her Beach from the world forever. Sam is rescued by his Bridges allies, returning to the living. Die-Hardman becomes President of the UCA, and Fragile resolves to rebuild her company. Sam is told that Lou is dying. Although UCA law demands dying BBs are incinerated, Sam follows Deadman's advice and removes Lou from the pod in hopes of saving its life. In doing so, Sam connects with Lou one last time and discovers the memories he has viewed are his own: he is Clifford Unger's son, who Bridget Strand had transformed into one of the first BBs, accidentally killed alongside Clifford during a botched escape attempt, and resurrected by Amelie. In doing so, Amelie accidentally caused the Death Stranding, which allowed the BTs to cross over. The spirits of deceased BBs help save Lou's life, and Sam destroys his UCA cufflinks, going "off the grid" to live a peaceful life raising BB, whom he reveals is actually "Louise" in a post-credits scene.

== Development ==
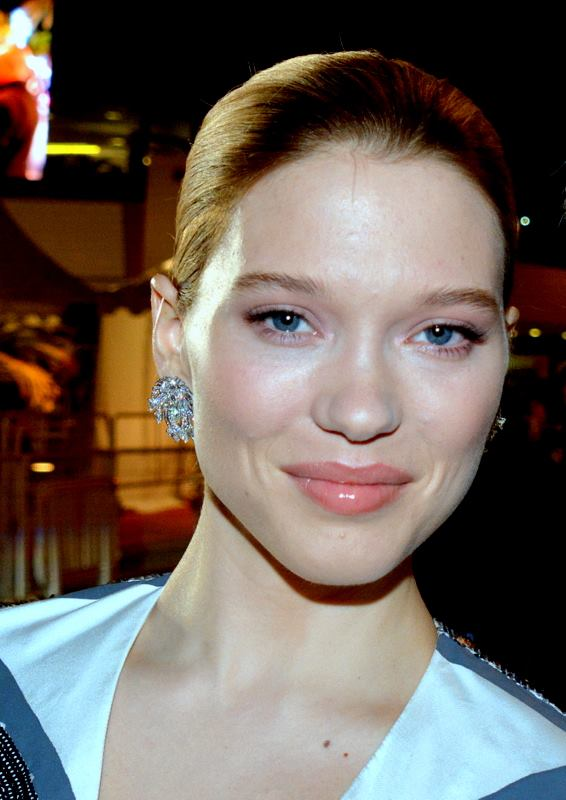
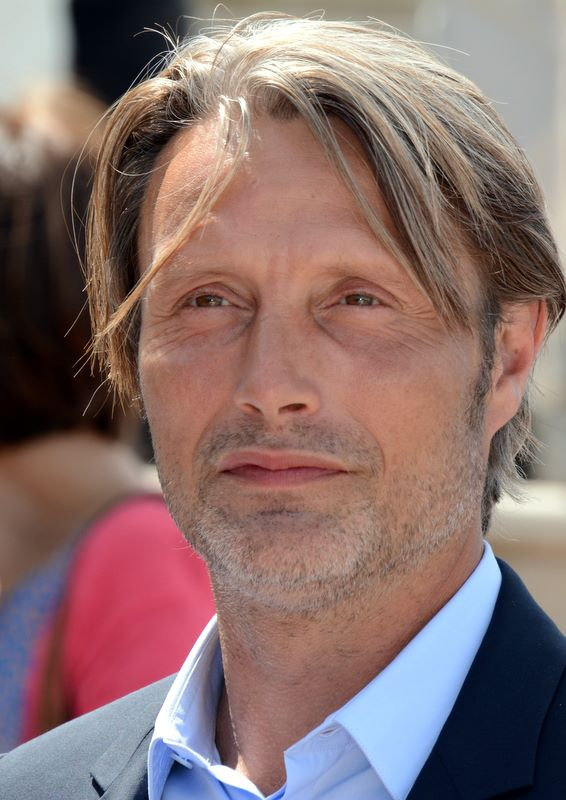
Léa Seydoux and Mads Mikkelsen portrayed Fragile and Cliff respectively.

After a lengthy corporate conflict with Konami as a restricted subsidiary, Kojima Productions closed in July 2015 and re-formed as an independent video game developer and studio in December. The same month, Hideo Kojima announced his partnership with Sony Interactive Entertainment, at the time led by Andrew House, to make a new PlayStation game.

Kojima revealed the game at Sony's conference during E3 2016 with a teaser trailer featuring music from Low Roar, whose music would later be used in the final game. The trailer was made possible with the technology of photogrammetry and motion capture. It featured Norman Reedus, who served as the basis for the protagonist. The game was the second collaboration between Kojima and Reedus, following the canceled Silent Hills. Kojima and Mark Cerny, lead system architect of the PlayStation 4, spent two weeks in January 2016 looking for a game engine on which to develop the game. One candidate was used to develop a teaser trailer. Guerrilla Games was later announced as a collaborator on the development of the game, as it was providing their proprietary game engine Decima. Kojima Productions' meeting room was recreated in the engine as a reference of accuracy and for the purpose of testing physically based lighting.

The game entered full development in 2017. A few days before E3 2017, Kojima announced that the game would not appear during the usual Sony conference. In June, information came from Shawn Layden, president of Sony Interactive Entertainment America, affirming that Death Stranding was in fact in a playable alpha version, but he had not been able to categorize the game in a specific genre. A teaser was presented during The Game Awards 2017 in December, where Kojima, Reedus and del Toro made appearances. Kojima revealed that the team was unable to do any performance capture or voice-over for the third trailer in time for E3 2017 due to the 2016–17 video game voice actor strike, so it was delayed until the Game Awards.

In February 2018, Emily O'Brien and Troy Baker joined the cast for the game. At the event, a new trailer was shown, showing gameplay for the first time and revealing Léa Seydoux and Lindsay Wagner as part of the cast. On September 18, it was announced at Tokyo Game Show 2018 that Tommie Earl Jenkins would portray a key character in the game, and that Akio Ōtsuka, Kikuko Inoue, Nana Mizuki and Satoshi Mikami—veterans of the Metal Gear series—along with Kenjiro Tsuda had joined the game's Japanese voice cast. In March 2019, Hideo Kojima said that Death Stranding was slightly behind its release date schedule, and that he himself was testing and adjusting the gameplay day by day, defining that phase of development as "critical".

A trailer released in May 2019 introduced Margaret Qualley as Mama and Nicolas Winding Refn as Heartman. Several character names were revealed: Cliff (Mikkelsen), Fragile (Seydoux), Deadman (Del Toro), Die-Hardman (Jenkins), Higgs (Baker) and Amelie (Wagner). O'Brien, Jesse Corti and Darren Jacobs were credited for voice-over work in the trailer. Del Toro and Refn both received a "Special Appearance" credit, with Kojima later explaining that only their likenesses were used and their voice and motion capture were performed by other actors. The same trailer also revealed the game's release date of November 8, 2019. In an accompanying blog post, Kojima explained that the game's core theme was "the true importance of forging connections with others", referring to the player's goal of "reconnecting" an isolated and fractured society, to bridge its divides, and to "create new bonds or 'Strands' with other players around the globe." Certain themes and elements of the story were influenced by Kojima's childhood and the deaths of his parents.

During Gamescom 2019, two more trailers were shown. The first showed a key element of the game, a BB (Bridge Baby), alongside the character "Deadman". The second introduced the character "Mama". Additionally, a 6-minute gameplay trailer was shown, which introduces in detail various game mechanics, such as the ability to urinate and package delivery to isolated delivery stations. This trailer features Canadian journalist and video critic Geoff Keighley as a hologram who interacts with the main character Sam in the delivery station. Japanese writer Junji Ito appears as the hologram of the Engineer, who is voiced by Yuri Lowenthal. The film director was modelled after Jordan Vogt-Roberts, while director Edgar Wright provided his likeness for Thomas Southerland. Hirokazu Hamamura made an appearance as the Collector. Liam O'Brien and Sam Lake were credited as the voice actor and model of Veteran Porter, respectively. Phillip North is portrayed by Tommy Wirkola.

During the Tokyo Game Show conference, Kojima showed and commented live on an 83-minute video dedicated entirely to the general gameplay features. Kojima proclaimed that he was open to developing a sequel to further solidify the "strand game" genre. On September 26, 2019, Kojima Productions announced that the game had gone gold. In October 2019, it was announced that the game would be released on Windows by 505 Games in mid-2020, confirming rumors about a PC port that had circulated as early as 2015. It was released on July 14, 2020. The same month during a segment of Conan, comedian Conan O'Brien revealed a character modeled after him in-game, with O'Brien having been digitally scanned during a visit to Kojima Productions' studio. The official soundtrack of the game, Death Stranding: Timefall, was released through RCA Records and Sony Interactive Entertainment on November 7, 2019, featuring artists such as Chvrches, The Neighbourhood, Major Lazer, and Bring Me the Horizon. A director's cut version of the game featuring new gameplay additions was released for the PlayStation 5 on September 24, 2021, followed by a release for Windows on March 30, 2022. The base game released on PC Game Pass on August 23, 2022, and features several unlockable items. On November 9, 2024, the five-year anniversary of the game's launch on PlayStation 4, Kojima Productions announced that they had re-acquired the intellectual property rights to Death Stranding from Sony Interactive Entertainment, and that they had planned to bring the game to additional platforms, coinciding with the immediate launch of Director's Cut on the Microsoft Store for Windows, Xbox Series X/S consoles, and the Amazon Luna cloud gaming service.

== Reception ==
Reception

Aggregate scores
Aggregator	Score
Metacritic	PS4: 82/100; PC: 86/100; PS5: 85/100; XSXS: 91/100
OpenCritic	79% recommend

Review scores
Publication	Score
Destructoid	8/10
Easy Allies	8.0/10
Electronic Gaming Monthly	5/5
Famitsu	10/10, 10/10, 10/10, 10/10
GameRevolution	5/5
GameSpot	9/10
GamesRadar+	3.5/5
Giant Bomb	2/5
IGN	6.8/10
VideoGamer.com	8/10

The game's announcement at E3 2016 was met with a positive reception. In 2017, Death Stranding was nominated by Golden Joystick Awards in the category "Most Wanted Game". In June 2018, during the days following the E3 press conferences, Death Stranding reached the top ten in the most watched video game trailers on YouTube, with more than 4.5 million views.

Upon release, Death Stranding received "generally favorable" reviews, according to review aggregator website Metacritic. Publications noted a range of reactions from reviewers across the board, with the game being praised for its unique concepts, lasting appeal, graphics, voice acting, and soundtrack, but also being considered to be bloated, frustrating, and slow-paced.

Russ Frushtick of Polygon described Death Stranding as "the most advanced walking simulator the world has ever seen", and as being "composed entirely of fetch quests", but that it was "pretty damn fun once it gets out of its own way". Frushtick argued that the game "felt like two games in one", consisting of "a wholly unique open-world adventure with asynchronous cooperative multiplayer that allows me to feel like I'm part of a community, building a world from scratch" and "a long, confusing, deeply strange movie." Rating the game 7 out of 10, Game Informer's Matthew Kato wrote that the gameplay "really is as simple as it appears to be, and the elements around it – the story, combat, and lackluster mission objectives – aren't satisfying enough to anchor the title and get players invested." It is the fourth Hideo Kojima-directed game and the 26th overall to be awarded a perfect 40/40 score by Japanese video game magazine Famitsu.

The game was criticized for portraying asexuality as a "sexless" lifestyle choice, a rejection of emotional relationships, and responsible for the decline of birth rates. In the director's cut, the data log containing these views is revised and contains an attachment that notes the log "advances a controversial thesis widely regarded as unsubstantiated and discriminatory".

Death Stranding was also subject to review bombing on Metacritic. In December 2019, the website removed over 6,000 negative user reviews to prevent "potential score manipulation", judging them to be suspicious.

=== Sales ===
In its debut week, Death Stranding was the best-selling physical game in Japan, with Famitsu reporting that the game had sold 185,909 copies. This made it the most successful debut for a new intellectual property in Japan for the eighth generation of video game consoles, overtaking previous record holder Judgment. Death Stranding remained in the Famitsu top 30 best-selling physical games chart for five weeks, until December 15, 2019, having reached over 253,000 physical copies sold at that point. As of March 2020, the game's sales in Japan have reached 262,827 physical copies and an estimated 136,279 digital copies, for an estimated total of 399,106 sales in Japan.

In the UK, the title debuted at number two on the physical sales chart, outsold by Call of Duty: Modern Warfare. Its sales made it the second biggest PlayStation exclusive debut of the year, behind Days Gone. According to Media Create, Death Stranding also debuted at number one in the physical sales chart for both Taiwan and South Korea. The game also topped the Italian and French selling charts. It placed second in the Switzerland charts.

On the PlayStation Network, the game has reached an estimated total of 3 million players, including an estimated 390,000 monthly active users, as of April 2020. According to SuperData Research's estimates, Death Stranding sold 477,000 digital copies in its first month on Steam.

Hideo Kojima stated in May 2020 that the game had sold enough to recoup the development costs and turn a profit, securing funding for Kojima Productions' next project.

In April 2021, publisher 505 Games' parent organization Digital Bros announced in a financial report that the PC release had generated €23 million ($27 million) in revenue as of December 2020, making it the company's highest-grossing game in 2020. In October 2021, Digital Bros announced that the PC release had generated €31 million. As of March 2021, the game has sold 5 million copies worldwide for the PS4 and PC platforms.

By April 2025, Death Stranding had reached over 20 million players worldwide.

=== Awards ===
The game won the award for "Best PS4 Exclusive" at the IGN Game of the Year Awards 2019 and was nominated for "Best Music/Score" and "Best Art Direction".

Year	Award	Category	Result	Ref.
2017	Golden Joystick Awards	Most Wanted Game	Nominated	
2018	Golden Joystick Awards	Most Wanted Game	Nominated	
2018	Gamers' Choice Awards	Most Anticipated Game	Nominated	
2019	The Game Awards 2019	Game of the Year	Nominated	
2019	The Game Awards 2019	Best Game Direction	Won	
2019	The Game Awards 2019	Best Narrative	Nominated	
2019	The Game Awards 2019	Best Art Direction	Nominated	
2019	The Game Awards 2019	Best Score/Music	Won	
2019	The Game Awards 2019	Best Audio Design	Nominated	
2019	The Game Awards 2019	Best Performance (Mads Mikkelsen)	Won	
2019	The Game Awards 2019	Best Performance (Norman Reedus)	Nominated	
2019	The Game Awards 2019	Best Action/Adventure Game	Nominated	
2019	Japan Game Awards	Future Division	Won	
2020	Guild of Music Supervisors Awards	Best Music Supervision in a Video Game	Nominated	
2020	23rd Annual D.I.C.E. Awards	Game of the Year	Nominated	
2020	23rd Annual D.I.C.E. Awards	Adventure Game of the Year	Nominated	
2020	23rd Annual D.I.C.E. Awards	Outstanding Achievement in Animation	Nominated	
2020	23rd Annual D.I.C.E. Awards	Outstanding Achievement in Art Direction	Nominated	
2020	23rd Annual D.I.C.E. Awards	Outstanding Achievement in Audio Design	Won	
2020	23rd Annual D.I.C.E. Awards	Outstanding Achievement in Character (Cliff Unger)	Nominated	
2020	23rd Annual D.I.C.E. Awards	Outstanding Achievement in Character (Sam Porter Bridges)	Nominated	
2020	23rd Annual D.I.C.E. Awards	Outstanding Technical Achievement	Won	
2020	20th Game Developers Choice Awards	Game of the Year	Nominated	
2020	20th Game Developers Choice Awards	Best Narrative	Nominated	
2020	20th Game Developers Choice Awards	Best Technology	Nominated	
2020	20th Game Developers Choice Awards	Best Visual Art	Nominated	
2020	20th Game Developers Choice Awards	Best Audio	Nominated	
2020	20th Game Developers Choice Awards	Best Design	Nominated	
2020	20th Game Developers Choice Awards	Innovation Award	Nominated	
2020	SXSW Gaming Awards	Trending Game of the Year	Nominated	
2020	SXSW Gaming Awards	Matthew Crump Cultural Innovation Award	Nominated	
2020	SXSW Gaming Awards	Excellence in Animation	Nominated	
2020	SXSW Gaming Awards	Excellence in Musical Score	Won	
2020	SXSW Gaming Awards	Excellence in Narrative	Nominated	
2020	SXSW Gaming Awards	Excellence in Technical Achievement	Won	
2020	SXSW Gaming Awards	Excellence in Visual Achievement	Nominated	
2020	16th British Academy Games Awards	Animation	Nominated	
2020	16th British Academy Games Awards	Artistic Achievement	Nominated	
2020	16th British Academy Games Awards	Audio Achievement	Nominated	
2020	16th British Academy Games Awards	Debut Game	Nominated	
2020	16th British Academy Games Awards	Game Beyond Entertainment	Nominated	
2020	16th British Academy Games Awards	Music	Nominated	
2020	16th British Academy Games Awards	Original Property	Nominated	
2020	16th British Academy Games Awards	Performer in a Leading Role (Norman Reedus)	Nominated	
2020	16th British Academy Games Awards	Performer in a Supporting Role (Léa Seydoux)	Nominated	
2020	16th British Academy Games Awards	Performer in a Supporting Role (Troy Baker)	Nominated	
2020	16th British Academy Games Awards	Technical Achievement	Won	
2020	Webby Awards	Best Music/Sound Design	Nominated	
2020	Golden Joystick Awards	PC Game of the Year	Won	
2020	The Steam Awards	Most Innovative Gameplay Award	Won	
2022	The Steam Awards	Best Game on the Go	Won	

=== Legacy ===
Numerous commentators noted that the game's story and gameplay resembled the COVID-19 pandemic. The game's prescient similarities to the pandemic has drawn comparisons to the way in which a previous Kojima game from 2001, Metal Gear Solid 2: Sons of Liberty, had anticipated 2010s phenomena such as fake news and echo chambers. A parody game set in a post-apocalyptic world devastated by COVID-19, Walking Simulator, was released in March 2020.

== Sequel ==
A sequel was first revealed to be in development in May 2022, when Norman Reedus participated in an interview with the outlet Leo Edit to discuss his work on the game. Reedus stated, "We just started work on the second one". Later in the interview, he would reminisce about how, "the game came out, and it just won all these awards, and it was a huge thing", before reiterating that the development team had "just started part two of that". In response, Hideo Kojima posted a series of photos on Twitter, cheekily depicting him punishing Reedus for confirming the game's existence. The sequel was teased with images revealed at numerous game expos featuring Elle Fanning, Shioli Kutsuna, and Léa Seydoux.

A first trailer for Death Stranding 2 (stylized as DS2 and clarified to be a working title) was revealed at The Game Awards 2022, with the aforementioned teased actors confirmed, as well as Troy Baker, returning from the first game.

A second trailer was shown during a State of Play presentation by Sony on January 31, 2024, confirming its subtitle, On the Beach, and a release window of 2025. It included the likenesses of George Miller (performed by Marty Rhone) and Fatih Akin as a puppet (performed by Jonathan Roumie).

== Adaptations ==
=== Live-action film ===
A live-action film adaptation of Death Stranding was announced on December 15, 2022. Kojima Productions partnered with Alex Lebovici and his company Hammerstone Studios to produce the film alongside Allan Ungar as executive producer. A24 was revealed to be co-producing the film when a T-shirt depicting the company logo themed to Death Stranding was listed on A24's merchandise website. Michael Sarnoski is set to write and direct the film, with Ari Aster and Lars Knudsen as producers.

=== Anime film ===
In June 2025, Kojima Productions announced that an anime film based on Death Stranding tentatively named Death Stranding Mosquito was in development with Line Mileage. It will be directed by ABC Animation's Hiroshi Miyamoto and will have an original story by Aaron Guzikowski. A teaser trailer was released on September 23, 2025.

=== Original net animation ===
In November 2025, an original net animation series titled Death Stranding Isolations was announced, which will tell a story separate from the video game. The series is produced by E&H Production. It is set to be released on Disney+ in 2027.
