= Sunghoo Park =

South Korean anime director

- 박성후
- Education: Chiyoda Institute of Technology and Art
- Occupations: Anime director; animator
- Years active: 2004–present
- Known for: The God of High School, Jujutsu Kaisen

Korean name
- Hangul: 박성후
- Hanja: 朴性厚
- RR: Bak Seonghu
- MR: Pak Sŏnghu

Sunghoo Park (Korean: 박성후, Japanese: 朴性厚) is a South Korean anime director and animator based in Japan. He is best known for directing the anime television series The God of High School and the first season of Jujutsu Kaisen.

== Biography ==
Park decided to enter the anime industry after he watched the film Macross: Do You Remember Love? and its anime series. He first studied at a university in South Korea that has an animation department, but eventually moved to Japan to study at the Chiyoda Institute of Technology and Art.

In 2004, he joined Studio Comet, working on series such as Onegai My Melody. In 2017, under MAPPA, he made his directorial debut with Garo: Vanishing Line.

He also worked on the opening sequence for Zombie Land Saga, and became the assistant director for Banana Fish. In 2020, he directed The God of High School, a South Korean webcomic adaptation. Later that year, he directed Jujutsu Kaisen, which won Anime of the Year at the 5th Crunchyroll Anime Awards. Park himself was also nominated for Best Director at the same awards. In December 2021, Park directed the film prequel, Jujutsu Kaisen 0. Park wanted to make each character's facial expression carefully to give them a proper look when fighting. He considers the new protagonist, Yuta Okkotsu, as a straightforward teenager. He aimed to show Okkotsu's loneliness caused by Rika's Curse. Megumi Ogata surprised Park in the making of the movie for giving Yuta a sensitive characterization when crying. Park added elements of Chinese movies to the feature which he wanted fans to look forward to. He also praised Seko's script for the movie which is meant to show Okkotsu's transformation into a hero. While the television series was noted for having entertaining fight scenes, MAPPA aimed to make the film cooler. In 2022, the second cour of Jujutsu Kaisen was nominated for Anime of the Year. Park was also once again nominated for Best Director.

Park founded the anime studio E&H Production in March 2021.

== Works ==
=== TV series ===
- Terror in Resonance (2014) (key animator)
- Yuri!!! on Ice (2016) (key animator)
- Garo: Vanishing Line (2017–2018) (director)
- Banana Fish (2018) (assistant episode director) (ep 13)
- The God of High School (2020) (director)
- Jujutsu Kaisen (2020–2021) (director)
- Ninja Kamui (2024) (director)
- Magic Knight Rayearth (2026) (creative producer)

=== Films ===
- Jujutsu Kaisen 0 (2021) (director)

=== Specials ===
- Undead Unluck Winter Arc (2025)

=== Original net animations ===
- Monsters: 103 Mercies Dragon Damnation (2024) (director, writer)
- Bullet/Bullet (2025) (director, original story draft)
