= Undead Unluck =

Japanese manga series and its adaptations

- First tankōbon volume cover, featuring Andy (front) and Fuuko Izumo (back)

アンデッドアンラック (Andeddo Anrakku)
- Genre: Adventure; Comedy; Supernatural
- Manga
- Written by: Yoshifumi Tozuka
- Published by: Shueisha
- English publisher: NA: Viz Media
- Imprint: Jump Comics
- Magazine: Weekly Shōnen Jump
- Original run: January 20, 2020 – January 27, 2025
- Volumes: 27
Further information
Novel
Undead Unluck: Fuzoroi na Union no Nichijō
Written by	Sawako Hirabayashi
Illustrated by	Yoshifumi Tozuka
Published by	Shueisha
Imprint	Jump J-Books
Published	February 3, 2023
Novel
Undead Unluck: Romantic na Hiteisha no Kyūjitsu
Written by	Sawako Hirabayashi
Illustrated by	Yoshifumi Tozuka
Published by	Shueisha
Imprint	Jump J-Books
Published	October 4, 2023
Anime television series
Directed by	Yuki Yase
Produced by	Hiroshi Kamei; Souta Satou; Masahiro Tomobe
Written by	Yamato Haijima
Music by	Kenichiro Suehiro
Studio	David Production (animation); TMS Entertainment (production and planning) (Note: Under the "Unlimited Produce by TMS" label)
Licensed by	Disney Platform Distribution (streaming); NA: Viz Media (home video); UK: Anime Limited (home video)
Original network	JNN (MBS, TBS)
Original run	October 7, 2023 – present
Episodes	24
Novel
Undead Unluck: Hiteisha-tachi no Aoharu na Kōkō Seikatsu
Written by	Sawako Hirabayashi
Illustrated by	Yoshifumi Tozuka
Published by	Shueisha
Imprint	Jump J-Books
Published	April 4, 2025
Anime television film
Undead Unluck: Winter Arc
Directed by	Sunghoo Park
Written by	Yamato Haijima
Music by	Kenichiro Suehiro
Studio	E&H Production (animation); TMS Entertainment (production and planning)
Original network	JNN (MBS, TBS)
Released	December 25, 2025
Runtime	48 minutes
- icon

Undead Unluck (Japanese: アンデッドアンラック, Hepburn: Andeddo Anrakku) is a Japanese manga series written and illustrated by Yoshifumi Tozuka. It was serialized in Shueisha's shōnen manga magazine Weekly Shōnen Jump from January 2020 to January 2025, with its chapters collected in 27 tankōbon volumes. The series is licensed for English release in North America by Viz Media.

An anime television series adaptation, produced by TMS Entertainment and animated by David Production, aired from October 2023 to March 2024. A one-hour special anime sequel produced by E&H Production aired in December 2025. A second season has been announced.

== Synopsis ==
Fuuko Izumo is an 18-year-old girl who has been living in seclusion for ten years since an incident that left more than 200 people dead, including her parents, when she was eight years old. Following the completion of her favorite long-running shōjo manga series, Fuuko decides to commit suicide. She is tormented by the fact that her "unluck" ability brings bad luck to anyone she directly comes into contact with. She soon meets an "undead" man who has amazing regenerative abilities and who desires to die the best death possible, disliking his immortal life. For the sake of convenience, Fuuko names him Andy because he is undead, and they begin to work together. However, they soon see themselves chased by the Union (ユニオン, Yunion), a mysterious organization.

Eventually, an assassin of the Union called Shen tells them that the organization has a special team consisting of ten people with special abilities, and that by joining the team, they will no longer be hunted, so the two decide to join in order to attain Andy's wish for "the best death", and face numerous enemies and the mysteries of the world.

The missions of the team are proposed by a talking book called Apocalypse (黙示録(アポカリプス), Apokaripusu), which has supernatural powers. There are people with the ability to negate the rules of the world called Negators (否定者, Hitei-sha). The Union is an organization of Negators specialized in the hunting of UMA (ユーマ, Yūma) or Unidentified Mysterious Animals, creatures that are the embodiment of the Earth's rules (such as thirst and decay) and are created by God as both the objectives for the quests provided by Apocalypse, as well as punishment for failing them. They also must defeat a group of Negators that opposes the Union called Under (アンダー, Andā) and Regulators (調整者, Regyurētā), beings chosen to do God's bidding.

== Media ==
=== Manga ===
Written and illustrated by Yoshifumi Tozuka, Undead Unluck was first published as a one-shot chapter in Shueisha's shōnen manga magazine Weekly Shōnen Jump on January 28, 2019. The manga was serialized in the same magazine from January 20, 2020, to January 27, 2025. Shueisha collected its chapters in 27 individual tankōbon volumes, released from April 3, 2020, to April 4, 2025; the final volume includes five epilogue chapters.

The manga is digitally serialized by Viz Media on its Shonen Jump website. In October 2020, Viz Media announced the print and digital publication of the manga. The 27 volumes were released from May 4, 2021, to October 20, 2026.

=== Novels ===
A novel written by Sawako Hirabayashi, titled Undead Unluck: Fuzoroi na Union no Nichijō (アンデッドアンラック 不揃いなユニオンの日常, Andeddo Anrakku Fuzoroina Yunion no Nichijō; "Undead Unluck: Strange Daily Life in Union"), was published on February 3, 2023. It features a previously untold story about the everyday lives of those in the Union organization. It includes the stories "Gina's Recollection" and "Shen's Academy Infiltration". Tozuka oversaw the novel and drew the illustrations.

A second novel by the same writer, titled Undead Unluck: Romantic na Hiteisha no Kyūjitsu (アンデッドアンラック ロマンチックな否定者の休日, Andeddo Anrakku Romanchikku na Hiteisha no Kyūjitsu; "Undead Unluck: The Romantic Negator's Day Off"), was released on October 4, 2023.

A third novel, titled Undead Unluck: Hiteishatachi no Aoharu na Kōkō Seikatsu (アンデッドアンラック 否定者たちのアオハルな高校生活, Andeddo Anrakku Hiteisha-tachi no Aoharu na Kōkō Seikatsu), was released on April 4, 2025.

=== Anime ===
In August 2022, an anime television series adaptation was announced. Produced and planned by TMS Entertainment, and animated by David Production, it was directed by Yuki Yase, with character designs handled by Hideyuki Morioka, and music composed by Kenichiro Suehiro. The series aired in two consecutive cours from October 7, 2023, to March 23, 2024, on the Super Animeism programming block on all JNN affiliates, including MBS and TBS. (Note: MBS and TBS listed the series premiere on October 6, 2023, at 25:23, which is effectively October 7 at 1:23 a.m. JST.) The first opening theme song is "01" performed by Queen Bee, while the first ending theme song is "Know Me..." performed by Kairi Yagi. The second opening theme song is "Love Call" (ラブコール, Rabu Kōru) performed by Shiyui, while the second ending theme song is "Kono Ai ni Kanau Mon wa Nai" (この愛に敵うもんはない; lit. 'There's Nothing That Can Compete with This Love') performed by Okamoto's.

The series is streaming on Hulu in the United States, and worldwide outside Japan on Disney+ (Latin America on Star+, India and Southeast Asian territories on Disney+ Hotstar). In June 2023, TMS Entertainment and Bang Zoom! Entertainment announced that they would hold open auditions for a role in the English dub for the series at the Anime Expo on July 4 of the same year, which eventually premiered on December 13 of the same year. Viz Media released the full series in North America on a Blu-ray Disc set on March 25, 2025. Anime Limited has licensed the series in the United Kingdom and will release the first 12 episodes on a Blu-ray Disc set on May 18, 2026.

In August 2024, a one-hour special anime sequel was announced, which aired on December 25, 2025. The sequel was produced by E&H Production, with Sunghoo Park directed and handled storyboards while the staff from the first season reprised their roles.

On the same day the special aired, a second season was announced.

==== Episodes ====
No.	Title (Note: English translated titles are taken from Hulu.)	Directed by (Note: Production staff information is taken from the ending credits of each episode.)	Written by	Storyboarded by	Original release date
1	"Undead and Unluck"; Transliteration: "Fushi to Fūn" (Japanese: 不死と不運)	Yuki Yase	Yamato Haijima	Yuki Yase	October 7, 2023
Fuuko Izumo is an 18-year-old girl who is cursed with the ability of Unluck. Anyone who touches her directly receives an extreme case of bad luck. Fed up, she decides to commit suicide. Before she can, she meets Undead, a being who cannot die and regenerates from any injury. Undead kidnaps Fuuko and forces her to explain her powers at his hideout. Unbeknownst to either of them, they were followed by a group of agents who plan to capture both of them to study their abilities. Undead quickly dispatches the main agent's goons but the main agent takes Fuuko hostage and forces Undead to surrender. Undead agrees to this and moved by his actions, Fuuko reveals that the more intimate the contact, the more extreme the Unluck. She then runs up to Undead's head and kisses him. This causes her Unluck to make a meteorite crash on top of the main agent and Undead, which only Undead survives. Fuuko later decides to refer to Undead as Andy. After realizing how powerful Fuuko's ability is and what triggers it, he says the next thing to do is to have sex, which makes Fuuko run away in fear.
2	"Union" (Note: Stylized in all caps)	Tatsuya Kyōgoku	Yamato Haijima	Makoto Muta	October 14, 2023
Fuuko reveals that another factor to her ability is how much she likes the person. Hearing this, Andy decides to keep her alive for as long as possible. Andy later reveals that the agents that attacked them were members of a covert group called "the Union". As the two are leaving town, two Union agents attack them. Fuuko is trapped by one of the agents named Shen, while the other agent suddenly paralyzes Andy's body. Andy deduces that this agent's ability is Unavoidable. Meanwhile, Fuuko realizes that both of these agents are Negators and asks why they are not hunted as well. Shen reveals that they are members of a special group within the Union called the Roundtable. Unavoidable also reveals that the only way for others to join is if another member dies. Hearing this, Andy decides to kill them. After a lengthy battle, Andy kills Unavoidable. Realizing they cannot win against Shen due to his unknown ability, Andy offers to let Fuuko take the open spot. Instead, Shen tells them that another agent will show up in Russia and if they manage to kill them, they both can join the Roundtable.
3	"How to Use My Unluck"; Transliteration: "Watashi no Fuun no Tsukaikata" (Japanese: 私の不運の使い方)	Shinji Nagata	Yamato Haijima	Mamoru Kurosawa	October 21, 2023
Fuuko and Andy travel to Russia to kill the mystery agent Shen told them about. On the way, they are attacked by fighter jets along with a satellite attack by the mystery agent who appears to be in love with Andy. After using their abilities to escape their attackers, Fuuko and Andy crash land outside a lake in Russia. Andy leaves in order to gather weapons and former allies of his to fight the mystery agent. Fuuko travels around the lake where she meets a young looking girl named Gina. The two become friendly and spend time painting the night sky. After they are done, Gina reveals that she is the mystery agent sent to capture Fuuko and Andy. Andy returns and reveals that Gina is also the same woman who took him prisoner 50 years ago.
4	"Do You Love the Change in Me?"; Transliteration: "Kawaru Watashi wa Sukidesu ka?" (Japanese: 変わる私は好きですか？)	Shuntarō Tozawa	Yamato Haijima	Shuntarō Tozawa	October 28, 2023
Andy continues his fight against Gina, who reveals her ability is called Unchange, which freezes anything she wants in stasis. It is also responsible for her youthful appearance. Andy continues to attack but Gina's ability prevents him from hitting her. Andy resorts to using Fuuko's ability by severing his head and regenerating his body under her clothes. This infuriates Gina and she uses her hat as a flying buzzsaw to attack the two. While dodging, Fuuko realizes there must be an open spot in Gina's shield by her feet. They also find out that Gina's ability uses a series of invisible arms to ensnare her opponents. Furthermore, they learn Gina has been traveling using a cloaked spaceship, which was the source of the satellite attack. With all this information and the built up Unluck, Andy successfully bypasses Gina's shield and causes the Unluck to kill her.
5	"United We Negate"; Transliteration: "Wareware wa Hitei Suru" (Japanese: 我々は否定する)	Tatsuya Kyōgoku	Yamato Haijima	Tatsuya Kyōgoku	November 4, 2023
Saddened over Gina's death, Fuuko and Andy go to a bar. There, a monster grabs the two and brings them to the Roundtable. After the leader calms everyone down, a strange book descends and reveals a series of quests. They are also warned that failure to complete all the quests will result in the creation of UMA Galaxy. The leader decides to focus on quests that give them more Artifacts and a new member. Fuuko asks about the book and is told that it is called Apocalypse. When Fuuko also ask why they must go on these quests at all, the leader reveals why. That failure to do so will cause more rules and punishments to appear causing further chaos around the world. She further states that the ultimate goal of the Roundtable is to kill the person responsible for all of this, God. Andy agrees to take on the quest in finding and capturing the UMA Spoil and drags Fuuko and Shen along. While Fuuko and Andy are receiving their official Union uniforms, they are attacked by the UMA Clothes. However, when it tries to possess Andy, it ultimately submits to Andy's will and becomes his new uniform. The group is then informed Spoil has been spotted in New York.
6	"Spoil"	Shinji Nagata	Yamato Haijima	Shinji Nagata	November 11, 2023
Fuuko, Andy, and Shen travel to Longing, Nevada after learning the previous intelligence was a false lead. Shen says that Union scouts walled off the city before they died. Upon arrival, Andy blows a hole in the wall to gain an entryway but unleashes a horde of zombies. Andy quickly disposes of most of them except for one, who is still cognizant. Shen states that UMAs are the living embodiment of the rules and punishments made by God and that Andy's recklessness has most likely already caused him to be exposed to Spoil's power. Clothes confirms this by showing that a timer has shown up on Andy's stomach. When the timer hits zero, Andy's body starts to rot but due to his Undead ability, it only works halfway. The zombie says she will reveal where Spoil is if Andy agrees to marry her, which he complies. Meanwhile, Fuuko and Shen find some children hiding in a bunker who are also infected. To gain their trust, Fuuko willingly becomes infected as well. Elsewhere, after going through with the wedding, the zombie reveals the angel statue is actually Spoil. Once Andy attacks it, Spoil drops his disguise.
7	"Dream"	Junya Sanetoshi	Yamato Haijima	Tetsuji Nakamura	November 17, 2023
When Fuuko and Shen ask the children what happened, the oldest, Ken, explains that Spoil arrived a week ago and started turning people into zombies. Their teacher, who is revealed to be the zombie Andy married, hid them in the bunker and told them to focus on their dreams. This is shown to be the reason why their countdown is so high. Fuuko and Shen leave the bunker to join Andy, who is fighting Spoil with the help of the zombies. When one of them accidentally runs into Fuuko, her Unluck causes a sign to hit Spoil and crush the zombie. Seeing this, Andy tells the zombies to touch Fuuko to become bombs. The teacher willingly sacrifices herself to save the children, which causes Spoil to fall on a gunpowder store, triggering a massive explosion. Encouraged by this, all the zombies start running toward Spoil while Fuuko touches them. However, Spoil transforms after he sucks them up. When Spoil taunts the group, Fuuko focuses on her dream of living a normal life, causing her countdown to rapidly rise. The same thing happens when Shen decides to join the fight as well.
8	"Victhor"	Katsuichi Nakayama	Yamato Haijima	Mamoru Kurosawa	November 25, 2023
Using the Nyoi-Kinko staff, which can expand and shrink at will, along with his ability, revealed as Untruth, Shen deals considerable damage to Spoil. Andy tries to help by using Fuuko's Unluck to cause another explosion. However, it causes him to fall into a chasm that opened beneath him. This distraction allows Spoil to kick up a cloud of dust to block Shen's Untruth and begin charging a massive laser attack. Fuuko suggests launching Spoil into space, which Shen agrees and convinces Andy to use the Nyoi-Kinko staff to launch both himself and Spoil up there. Shen also convinces Andy to remove the card lodged in his forehead. This releases a more powerful alter ego named Victor, or as Shen calls him "Victhor, the God of Victory". Victor easily dismembers Spoil before returning to the Earth. Shen then has Mei teleport Spoil's core away using the Organization's spaceship. Victor appears to struggle with Andy trying to regain control of their body, but Victor refuses to let anyone confine him again. He quickly defeats Shen and is about to kill Fuuko when Shen summons the rest of the Roundtable.
9	"Return"	Shuntarō Tozawa	Yamato Haijima	Shuntarō Tozawa & Yuki Yase	December 2, 2023
The Roundtable continue to fight Victor. Juiz orders Top to get Fuuko and Shen away from the fight. However, Fuuko convinces him to take her back there. To help her, Shen gives her Andy's card and a gun. Fuuko soon grabs onto Victor with her bare chest touching him, planning to hang on for as long as possible to trigger a massive stroke of Unluck while trying to talk Andy into coming back. The Roundtable move to protect Fuuko. Fuuko temporarily brings Andy back by shooting him and jamming her thumb in the open wound. Andy uses this opportunity to kiss Fuuko to trigger a massive Unluck that will destroy the town with a meteor swarm. The others escape the blast but Fuuko runs back into the crater to jam the card back into Andy's head. A week later, Fuuko wakes up in the Union's hospital where Andy has been watching over her. She is told that the children she previously encountered are safe and will be protected until they turn 18. Fuuko and Andy join the others as Apocalypse is about to reveal the results from the quest they were given.
10	"Result"	Tatsuya Kyōgoku	Sei Tsuguta	Tatsuya Kyōgoku	December 9, 2023
A Negator known as Unseen is being held hostage by an unknown individual. Meanwhile, Apocalypse reveals the results of the Roundtable's quests: he announces they have cleared five of them. As such, they are granted multiple rewards, most notably the ability to add an eleventh seat and the location of Unrepair. However, because they failed the sixth quest, the UMA Galaxy is created as a penalty. Using the UMA Move, the Roundtable teleport near Mount Augustus. Thanks to Union scientists, they learn that it has altered the world so concepts like planets, religion, and weekdays have always existed. Shortly after, they are attacked by aliens but are quickly stopped thanks to Juiz's ability, Unjustice. Juiz also reveals that the team cannot take any more penalties because if they reach 100 penalties, the next one will be Ragnarök. She further states that Apocalypse will not open again until they have full membership and if they do not find an eleventh member in three months, another penalty will automatically be added. Andy volunteers to find Unrepair. Juiz assigns Tatiana and Fuuko to assist him.
11	"Rio de Janeiro"	Shō Sugawara	Yamato Haijima	Shō Sugawara	December 16, 2023
In a flashback, Andy and Fuuko tracked Unrepair to a black market auction being held on a ship in Rio de Janeiro, used by mafia worldwide to sell captured Negators, UMAs, and Artifacts to the highest bidder. Back in the present, Andy and Fuuko buy fancy clothes to disguise themselves as a married celebrity couple. Fuuko recalls an earlier conversation she had with Juiz where the latter explained the reason she was chosen for the mission. Andy and Fuuko infiltrate the auction, while Tatiana is tasked with investigating the ship from the outside. Andy and Fuuko find out that there is a Negator up for auction. Tatiana later alerts them that the ship is under attack by a rogue group of Negators led by Rip, the man who tortured Unseen. Juiz states that the group is called Negator Hunters, Negators who use their abilities to cause chaos to get revenge against the world. Andy and Fuuko move in to stop them from kidnapping the auctioned Negator.
12	"Activate"	Junya Sanetoshi	Yamato Haijima	Tetsuji Nakamura	December 23, 2023
Andy and Fuuko use their abilities to make it past the guards and get to the cargo hold of the ship. Meanwhile, the auctioned Negator, a young boy with the Unmove ability named Chikara, attempts to escape in the chaos but is confronted by Rip, who has the Unrepair ability. Andy and Fuuko soon arrive and are assisted by Tatiana, who fights Rip's allies. Rip tries to convince Andy and Fuuko to join him but both refuse. Rip states that he will kill Chikara so his ability will be transferred to a better person because he thinks Chikara is too cowardly to join. Fuuko gets injured by Rip after she jumps in front of a blade to defend Chikara. Rip then flees as more guards show up. As the guards shoot, Chikara uses his ability to stop the bullets and the guards.
13	"Tatiana" (Russian: Татьяна)	Shinji Nagata	Yamato Haijima	Shinji Nagata, Tatsuya Kyōgoku & Mamoru Kurosawa	January 6, 2024 (Note: Episode 13 was released on Hulu a week before its broadcast in Japan.)
Tatiana fights against Rip's allies, Creed and Fang. Andy informs her that Fuuko was injured by Rip and only has an hour before she bleeds out. Tatiana tells Andy to take Fuuko and Chikara to the top deck. Tatiana decides to fully unleash her ability, Untouchable. Through a series of flashbacks, it is revealed that when Tatiana first got her ability, it killed both of her parents. Traumatized, she ran away only to get captured by the mafia and later recruited into the Union by Billy. Nico constructed her armored suit as a way to contain her ability. It also shows how Tatiana and Fuuko became friends. Tatiana's ability destroys the ship and Andy spots Rip, intent on killing him.
14	"Crimson Bullet"; Transliteration: "Kurimuzon Baretto" (Japanese: 紅蓮弾(クリムゾンバレット))	Tatsuya Kyōgoku	Yamato Haijima	Mamoru Kurosawa	January 13, 2024
Andy continues to fight Rip but is unable to land a hit thanks to the unknown ability of another ally of Rip's named Latla. Andy lands a hit on Latla by curving one of his finger bullets out of her line of sight. Rip fights back using a series of Artifacts. Chikara tries to help but is unable to use his ability to stop Rip. Andy has Fuuko kiss him to summon a meteor to strike Rip. However, this is used as a distraction to encourage Rip to attack Fuuko and Chikara while they are separated from Andy. Chikara stops Rip while Andy shoots him from behind. Rip and his allies escape using an Orca summoned by Latla. Andy confirms that Rip's ability has been released so Fuuko is now safe. Fuuko invites Chikara to join the Union. A week later, while waiting at Chikara's school to see whether or not he will join them, Andy and Fuuko are confronted by a much younger looking Rip.
15	"Under"	Katsuichi Nakayama	Sei Tsuguta	Katsuichi Nakayama	January 20, 2024
Rip states he is there to tell Andy and Fuuko what him and his group are doing and to deliver an Artifact that looks like a revolver. Upon touching it, Andy and Fuuko see images of Ragnarök. Rip states the Union's fight against God is pointless and that his team Under seek to have Negators rule the world until Ragnarök happens. Rip says they will carry this plan out in three months before he leaves. Chikara, overhearing all of this, becomes terrified and tries to run away but is stopped by Andy and the three go into the school to talk it out. Chikara reveals his backstory where he accidentally killed his parents when his ability first manifested. He has since dedicated his life to atone for it and he decides to join the Union. After saying goodbye to his best friend, Chikara asks Nico to wipe any trace he ever existed from anyone's memory. Fuuko asks Andy to teach her how to fight. All eleven Roundtable members gather as Apocalypse reveals a new set of quests.
16	"Revolution"	Eiichi Kuboyama	Yamato Haijima	Taizō Yoshida	January 27, 2024
Apocalypse reveals four quests and states that everyone on Earth is free to join in and that failure will result in the 100th penalty, UMA Revolution. As Juiz is about to assign the task, Billy interrupts and starts shooting at everyone and injures Isshin. Billy reveals himself as a traitor and leader of Under. With the help of Rip, Latla and UMA Burn, he takes the Roundtable stating that he alone will kill God. Top tries to fight him with his ability, Unstoppable, but is quickly defeated when Billy shows similar abilities to the other members. Tatiana is confused as she believed Billy's ability was Unbelievable, allowing him to always hit his target with ricochet shots. Juiz, Andy, and Shen try to attack but are all countered by Billy using their abilities as well. Billy ask Tatiana to join him, but Fuuko convinces her to refuse. As Billy leaves with the Roundtable, Juiz states that if they do not get it back, they will lose their connection to God. Everybody launches an all out operation to stop him, focusing on using Andy and Fuuko to neutralize Burn.
17	"Outsmart"	Shō Sugawara	Yamato Haijima	Takashi Kawabata	February 3, 2024
Andy and Fuuko confront Billy and Burn as the other members set up objects for Fuuko's Unluck to utilize. Burn is ultimately frozen and pierced with a giant pile bunker. Andy and Fuuko try to fight Billy but are unable to counter him due to him using the abilities of other members and Fuuko falls as Andy rushes to catch her. Burn breaks out of his frozen state and escapes the base as Andy and Fuuko are aided by Tatiana. Tatiana unleashes her ability on Billy while Fuuko grabs Apocalypse, holding it hostage and threatening to destroy it if Billy does not stand down. Angered by this, Apocalypse floods Fuuko's mind with the memories stored within him and tries to escape but is stopped when Phil and Shen arrive to help. Billy and his allies escape with the Roundtable as he states that they will be coming for something called "the Ark". Juiz orders everyone to stand down and return to base so she can tell them something she has been keeping secret.
18	"Cry for the Moon" (Note: Stylized in start case)	Tatsuya Kyōgoku	Sei Tsuguta	Tatsuya Kyōgoku	February 10, 2024
With the Roundtable members gathered, along with a restrained Apocalypse, Juiz reveals that the world is stuck in a loop of destruction and renewal caused by God. She also states that the meteors previously summoned by Fuuko's Unluck are actually pieces of the previous Earths. She says that the Ark is an Artifact that she has used to escape the destruction each time and make it to the new Earth. She further states that Andy's alter ego Victor has also lived through each cycle thanks to his Undead ability. Juiz says she has formed the Union each time in order to put an end to the cycle by killing God. She believes that Billy must have betrayed them because he found out about the cycle. The team assembles around a new roundtable to discuss how to complete the four quests and stop Billy and Under. To help with this, Juiz orders Andy and Fuuko to find a book said to show both the past and future.
19	"Undead + Unluck"; Transliteration: "Andeddo + Anrakku" (Japanese: あんでっど+あんらっく)	Jirō Fujimoto	Sei Tsuguta	Jirō Fujimoto	February 17, 2024
Juiz reveals that the book is actually Fuuko's favorite manga series, To You, From Me, and demonstrates how certain story arcs detail past events, like the alien invasion and fight with Spoil. Juiz believes that the raw manuscript was actually made via use of an Artifact that the author, Anno Un, used. Andy decides the best plan is to infiltrate the manga's production office with a copy of their own manga. Together with other Union members, Fuuko creates her own manga about the first time she and Andy met titled Undead + Unluck. Fuuko heads into the office and convinces her tour guide, Tahioka, to allow her to see the raw manuscript, confirming its creation via an Artifact. She also learns that there are other story arcs that were not published that talks about Billy's betrayal, the four active quests, and Andy's past. Tahioka then calls Anno Un and allows Fuuko to talk to them to set up a meeting in Canada. Fuuko leaves the office as Nico erases all memory of her being there.
20	"Anno Un" (Japanese: 安野雲)	Tatsuya Kyōgoku & Shō Sugawara	Sei Tsuguta	Mamoru Kurosawa	February 24, 2024
Andy and Fuuko are fighting Under to capture UMA Autumn when Fuuko is killed by Unseen. This is revealed as a vision from Anno Un. In the present, Andy and Fuuko meet with Anno Un in Stanley Park as they sneak up behind them. Anno Un tells them they are actually in the territory of Autumn right now and that they will discover new things about their powers from this fight. Andy and Fuuko confront Autumn and its swarm of Juniors. Anno Un helps out by creating a replica of Andy's arm with their Artifact and a plane to retreat in just as Under shows up. Anno Un takes them to their cabin for training. Anno Un manifests Autumn's arm, using its power to turn people into biography books to unlock the secret of Andy's past.
21	"Memento Mori" (Note: Stylized as "MEMENTO Mori")	Shuntarō Tozawa	Sei Tsuguta	Mamoru Kurosawa	March 2, 2024
Anno Un uses the Artifact Soul Caliber to transfer Fuuko's spirit into Andy's story. Fuuko awakens in the Old West era outside Longing, Nevada where she is confronted by bandits. Andy along with a crew of cowboys save her. At a saloon, Fuuko tries to earn their trust and explain the situation. She learns that they have been traveling the world helping people to try and help Andy figure out his forgotten past. She earns their trust after getting drunk with them and playing Russian roulette. Andy and his crew are then ambushed and killed by the bandits, only for Andy to awaken and kill them all, leading to him fully learning about his Undead ability. Fuuko travels all over the world with him, meeting and losing many people. One day, Andy reveals that April 15, 1865 in Washington, D.C. is the oldest memory he has. Hearing this, Fuuko starts to fade away. Before she leaves, she tells Andy about their first meeting in the future. She then awakens outside a building at the day and place Andy mentioned.
22	"Profile" (Note: Stylized in all lowercase)	Katsuichi Nakayama	Yamato Haijima	Katsuichi Nakayama	March 9, 2024
A couple of flashbacks show Juiz and Victor spending time together. Meanwhile, Fuuko finds herself outside a building in Washington, D.C. where she is confronted by Victor. He kills her repeatedly in order to force her to get to the end of the story where he can kill her for good. He plans to use her death to weaken Andy's psyche and take control again. Fuuko awakens outside the train station where she and Andy first met. Victor quickly arrives to finish her but is stopped by Andy. Andy ultimately wins by using his finger bullets to transfer Fuuko's Unluck onto Victor, ending with his head getting trapped in a capture tool. Afterwards, Fuuko decides she wants to talk to Victor. When asked about his relationship with Juiz, Victor states that due to his love for her, he wanted to kill her to end her suffering. However, he says he now believes Fuuko's Unluck is the key to defeating God as she has learned to personalize her Unluck. Fuuko asks him how to leave the story and Victor tells her to kiss Andy. The two kiss as Fuuko fades away and Andy waves goodbye.
23	"A Story I Won't See Coming"; Transliteration: "Boku no Shiranai Monogatari" (Japanese: ボクの知らない物語)	Shō Sugawara & Eiichi Kuboyama	Yamato Haijima	Ikuo Morimoto	March 16, 2024
As Fuuko is still in Andy's book, Anno Un is confronted by members of Under. In a series of flashbacks, it is revealed that as a child, Anno Un, real name Akira Kuno, loved his mother's stories, which inspired him to become a manga artist. One day, he found the G-Liner Artifact which not only granted him knowledge of past and future events but also awakened his Negator ability, Unknown. Rendering him unable to be noticed by anyone, however, Akira continued his love of writing manga and realized that as long as he used the pen name Anno Un, other people could still see it. As such, Akira was determined to change the future and save Fuuko and Andy. Back in the present, Fuuko and Andy return from the book where Andy uses his new Deadline ability to kill Unseen before he can kill Fuuko. Bunny steals Fuuko's gun before falling in a pit from Fuuko's Unluck. Fuuko tries to convince Rip to join them, but Rip refuses saying he and Latla are after the Ark. Latla overhears this and states that she is luring Autumn over to their location right now.
24	"To You, From Me"; Transliteration: "Kimi ni Tsutaware" (Japanese: 君に伝われ)	Tatsuya Kyōgoku	Yamato Haijima	Mamoru Kurosawa, Tatsuya Kyōgoku & Yuki Yase	March 23, 2024
Andy, Fuuko, Rip, Latla, and Bunny are fighting Autumn while Akira watches. Akira shouts out that he will create an Artifact that will lead to Autumn's capture. The Artifact is the same one Rip used to save his life by making him younger, but Akira uses it to age Rip back to his original form. Unfortunately, due to the side effect, it cost Akira his life and destroys his G-Liner Artifact. However, it is revealed that this was in fact a clone made by the real Akira, who is now permanently rendered Unknown. Rip decides to team up with Andy and Fuuko. Together, along with Latla and Bunny, they take down Autumn and capture its core. Rip decides to let Andy and Fuuko keep the core but takes the Soul Caliber Artifact for himself. Andy and Fuuko collapse due to the effect of being in Andy's book earlier. Meanwhile, Billy and Juiz meet while hunting UMA Winter.

== Reception ==
By September 2022, the manga had over 1.8 million copies in circulation. In 2020, it won the sixth Next Manga Award, placing first out of the 50 nominees with 31,685 votes. The manga ranked fourteenth on Takarajimasha's Kono Manga ga Sugoi! list of the best manga of 2021 for male readers. The series ranked sixth on the "Nationwide Bookstore Employees' Recommended Comics of 2021" by the Honya Club website. Type-Moon's Kinoko Nasu recommended the series with a comment featured on the obi of the ninth volume.

The series' first volume received mixed reviews. Anime News Network commended Tozuka's artwork but was highly critical of the depiction of Andy and Fuuko's relationship and its sexually exploitative nature. Hannah Collins of Comic Book Resources praised Tozuka's art in depicting violence and its comedic potential but also criticized the series' portrayal of the main characters' relationship wherein "Fuuko's body is primarily used as a sexualized tool for Andy to grope and fling around at will."
