= Garo: Vanishing Line =

Japanese anime television series

- Key Visual

牙狼〈GARO〉-VANISHING LINE-
- Created by: Keita Amemiya
- Anime television series
- Directed by: Sunghoo Park
- Produced by: Tooru Kubo; Yuusuke Kawanami (1–12); Takahiro Suzuki (13–24)
- Written by: Kiyoko Yoshimura
- Music by: Monaca: Ryūichi Takada; Keiichi Hirokawa
- Studio: MAPPA
- Licensed by: NA: Funimation
- Original network: TXN (TV Tokyo)
- Original run: October 6, 2017 – March 30, 2018
- Episodes: 24

Garo: Vanishing Line (牙狼〈GARO〉-VANISHING LINE-) is a Japanese original anime superhero television series produced by MAPPA. It aired from October 2017 to March 2018. The anime is a part of the Garo franchise and the third in the series of Garo: The Animation.

== Plot ==
Vanishing Line is set in the giant metropolis of Russell City, a fictional city in the United States. The man with the latest title of Garo, the Makai Knight Sword, secretly protects the city from Horrors which can possess humans. One day while annihilating a Horror, Sword encounters the phrase, "El Dorado". Believing it to be the key to a plot by the Horrors, he begins an investigation to find the meaning behind it and encounters a young orphan girl named Sophie. She is seeking her brother who disappeared, but who was also connected to the phrase "El Dorado". Together with the Makai Alchemists, Luke and Gina, they work together to solve the mystery. Their journey takes them to the magical city of "El Dorado" ruled by the enigmatic "King" who is protected by the Makai entities, Bishop, Knight and Queen.

== Characters ==
Sword (ソード, Sōdo)
Voiced by: Tomokazu Seki (Japanese); T. Axelrod (English)
The protagonist, also known as Garo the Golden Knight (黄金騎士・牙狼（ガロ）, Ōgon Kishi Garo) is the premier Makai Knight. He is a tall man with a muscular build who loves steak and is attracted to large-breasted women. He travels across Russel City fighting Horrors while searching for a clues about "El Dorado" on his customized bike, which transforms when he summons his golden armour. Unlike most versions of Garo previously shown, Sword prefers to fight bare handed but will use his sword (Garo-Ken) to defeat horrors and summon his armor.
Sophie Hennes (ソフィ, Sofi)
Voiced by: Rie Kugimiya (Japanese); Madeleine Morris (English)
A red-haired teenager living at the Katrina Home who is looking for clues about her missing brother Martin Hennes whose disappearance is connected to "El Dorado". Her search brings her in contact with a horror and eventually saved by Sword, who is also looking for El Dorado. She has since followed Sword and helped him hunt Horrors using her knowledge of the internet. She is hunted by the King of El Dorado wishes to recruit Sophie for an as-of-yet unrevealed purpose.
Martin Hennes (マーティン・ヘネス, Martin)
Voiced by: Romi Park (Japanese); Matt Shipman (English)
Sophie's older brother with a gentle character who always wanted to protect Sophie. He had excellent IT skills and was a genius hacker, but disappeared three years earlier leaving the keyword "El Dorado" on his personal computer password entry screen. He was actually recruited by the GarEden Corporation who promised to help him create a perfect world.
Zaruba (ザルバ)
Voiced by: Hironobu Kageyama (Japanese); Barry Yandell (English)
Sword's Madou Ring, having belonged to previous holders of the Garo title and served as both an advisor and a Horror detector. While in Sword's possession, Zaruba can control Sword's motorcycle.
Luke (ルーク, Rūku)
Voiced by: Nobunaga Shimazaki, Miyu Tomita (Young) (Japanese); David Matranga, Erica Mendez (Young) (English)
Luke is a Makai Alchemist who disapproves of Sword's irresponsible methods and association with humans. He uses firearms in the field with special magical ammunition, including one that can make rain that wipes the memories of those who witness a Horror. Luke was trained to become a Makai Knight until his mother was murdered by his father, Knight, whom he swore revenge on.
Gina (ジーナ, Jīna)
Voiced by: Ami Koshimizu (Japanese); Trina Nishimura (English)
Gina is a Makai Alchemist and professional thief who sometimes works with Sword to fight Horrors. She is somewhat immoral and highly manipulative and flirtatious but appears to have a soft spot for Sophie and encourages her and Sword to work together. It's hinted that she has feelings for Sword and she asked Sword to marry her, but that was only for a mission. In Episode 12, Sophie asked her, who she likes. She answered that she likes someone and watch to the bathroom door where Sword stands. This scene revealed her feelings for Sword. She is like a mother to Sophie and Sword is like the father.
Waitress Chiaki (ウェイトレス・チアキ, Weitoresu Chiaki)
Voiced by: Chiaki Takahashi (Japanese); Felecia Angelle (English)
A waitress at the diner where Sword obtains information regarding Horror locations.
Feilong (フェイロン, Feiron)
Voiced by: Takaya Hashi (Japanese); Vic Mignogna (English)
An old man living above the Chinese restaurant and long-term supporter of the Makai Knights. He and the employees of the restaurant are trained to help protect the city from Horrors with the use of barrier spells and talismans.
Meifang (メイファン, Meifan)
Voiced by: Ayahi Takagaki (Japanese); Apphia Yu (English)
Manager and waitress at the Chinese restaurant where Sword lives and works. She has at least some knowledge of Makai Alchemy and was even able to protect Sophie from several horrors at once.
Mia (ミーア, Mīa)
Voiced by: Yuuka Misaki (Japanese); Natalie Hoover (English)
Gina's magical pet ferret who often resides in between Gina's breasts.
Sister (シスター, Shisutā)
Voiced by: Atsuko Tanaka (Japanese); Carli Mosier (English)
Sister is a nun and Sophie's legal guardian. She is head of the Katrina Home in Russell City and an expert in martial arts. She was killed by Knight when he arrived to abduct Sophie.
Lizzy
Voiced by: Ayaka Ōhashi (Japanese); Cherami Leigh (English)
Sword's sister Lizzy was killed in an explosion of the research facility of Signa Slam Tech. She was attending middle school next to the company's building when the explosion occurred which also destroyed Lizzy's school.
King of El Dorado
Voiced by: Ryūsei Nakao (Japanese); Daman Mills (English)
King is the unseen leader of El Dorado who calls Sophie a princess and is intent on capturing her for an undisclosed purpose.
Bishop (ビショップ, Bishoppu)
Voiced by: Kenyuu Horiuchi (Japanese); David Wald (English)
Bishop is a Makai Alchemist and servant of the King of El Dorado. he appears to have considerable magical powers and control over Horrors.
Knight (ナイト, Naito)
Voiced by: Daisuke Namikawa (Japanese); Ricco Fajardo (English)
Luke's father and formerly considered the strongest Silver Makai Knight, he became a Dark Knight when he began serving the King of El Dorado. In Luke's flashbacks it appears Knight also killed Luke's mother and is now the target for Luke's vengeance.
Queen (クイーン, Kuīn)
Voiced by: Romi Park (Japanese); Monica Rial (English)
Queen is a Makai Alchemist and servant of the King of El Dorado and can control Carnivorous Plants that come from Makai. She is highly skilled in gymnastics, and extremely strong.
Stanley
Voiced by: Shinya Fukumatsu (Japanese); Kent Williams (English)
A former Makai Alchemist who became a researcher at El Dorado and because of his small body uses a cyborg body to move around. He is casually destroyed by Bishop for his perceived failure to capture Sophie.

== Anime ==
On August 13, it was announced that an original anime television series aired from October 6, 2017, to March 30, 2018, on TV Tokyo. The first opening theme "EMG" is performed by JAM Project, while the ending theme "Sophia" is performed by Masami Okui. The second opening theme is "Howling Sword" by Shuhei Kita, and the ending theme is "Promise" by Chihiro Yonekura. Funimation has licensed the series in North America.
