= Wagakki Band discography =

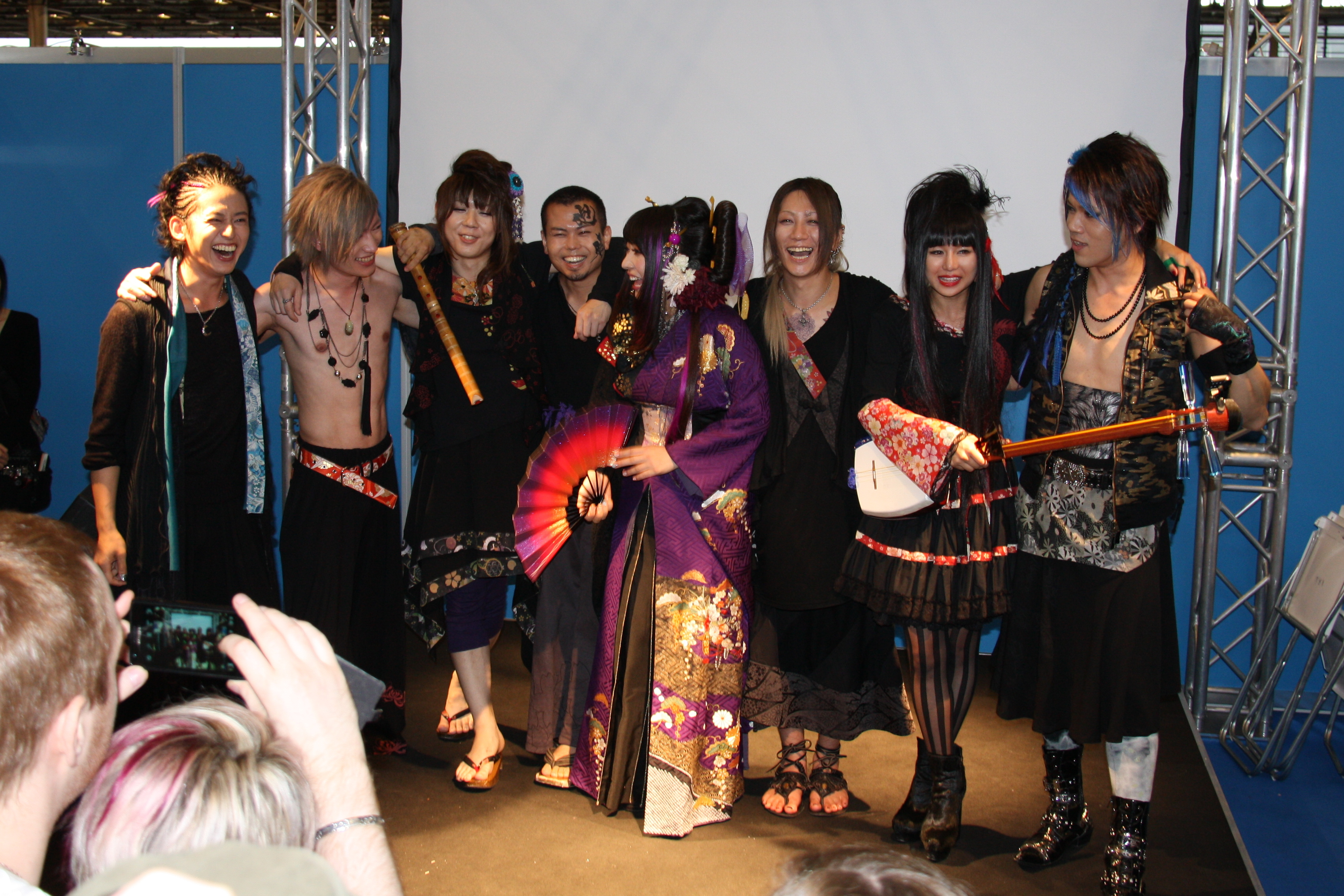
- Studio albums: 7
- EPs: 2
- Live albums: 1
- Compilation albums: 3
- Singles: 17 (Note: This includes regular, video, and digital-only singles.)
- Video albums: 8 (Note: This includes the music video compilation albums and concert DVDs.)

The discography of the Japanese band Wagakki Band consists of six studio albums, two compilation albums, and seventeen singles released since 2014.

== Albums ==
=== Studio albums ===
List of studio albums, with selected details, chart positions and certifications
Title	Album details	Peak positions		RIAJ certification
Title	Album details	JPN	TWN	RIAJ certification
Vocalo Zanmai	Released: April 23, 2014; Label: Avex Trax; Formats: CD, CD+DVD, CD+BD, digital	5	—	Gold
Yasō Emaki	Released: September 2, 2015; Label: Avex Trax; Formats: CD, CD+DVD, CD+BD, digital	1	1	Gold
Shikisai	Released: March 22, 2017; Label: Avex Trax; Formats: CD, CD+DVD, CD+BD, digital	2	—	
Otonoe	Released: April 25, 2018; Label: Avex Trax; Formats: CD, CD+DVD, CD+BD, digital	2	—	
Tokyo Singing	Released: October 14, 2020; Label: Universal Sigma; Formats: 2CD, CD+DVD, CD+BD, digital	5	2	
Vocalo Zanmai 2	Released: August 17, 2022; Label: Universal Sigma; Formats: 2CD, CD+DVD, CD+BD, digital	4	—	
I vs I	Released: July 26, 2023; Label: Universal Sigma; Formats: 2CD, CD+DVD, CD+BD, digital	6	—	
"—" denotes a recording that did not chart or was not released in that territory.

=== Compilations ===
List of media, with selected chart positions
Title	Album details	Peak positions		RIAJ certification
Title	Album details	JPN	TWN	RIAJ certification
Kiseki Best Collection +	Released: November 29, 2017; Label: Avex Trax; Formats: CD, CD+DVD, CD+BD, digital	3	—	Gold
Kiseki Best Collection II	Released: March 25, 2020; Label: Avex Trax; Formats: 2CD, 2CD+DVD, 2CD+BD, digital	4	2	
All Time Best Album Thanks: Yasō no Oto	Released: October 9, 2024; Label: Universal Sigma; Formats: 2CD, CD+DVD, CD+BD, digital	3	—	
"—" denotes a recording that did not chart or was not released in that territory.

=== Live albums ===
List of media, with selected chart positions
Title	Album details	Peak positions
Title	Album details	JPN
Wagakki Band 1st US Tour Shōgeki: Deep Impact	Released: January 25, 2017; Label: Avex Trax; Formats: CD, digital	48

=== Other releases ===
List of media, with selected details
Title	Album details
Joshō.	Released: November 17, 2013; Label: Self-released; Formats: CD; Released as Yuko Suzuhana with Wagakki Band

== Extended plays ==
List of EPs, with selected chart positions
Title	EP details	Peak positions	
Title	EP details	JPN	TWN
React	Released: December 4, 2019; Label: Universal Sigma; Formats: CD, CD+DVD, digital	5	8
Starlight	Released: June 9, 2021; Label: Universal Sigma; Formats: CD, CD+DVD, CD+BD, digital	5	—

== Singles ==
=== Regular singles ===
List of singles, with selected chart positions
Title	Year	Peak chart positions	Album
Title	Year	JPN	Album
"Amenochi Kanjōron"	2017	10	Kiseki Best Collection +
"Yuki Kagebōshi"	2018	6	Otonoe
"Sasameyuki"	2018	7	Otonoe

=== Split singles ===
List of singles, with selected chart positions
Title	Year	Peak chart positions	Notes
Title	Year	JPN	Notes
"Valkyrie" / "Eyes"	2016	26	Twin Star Exorcists opening theme, c/w ending theme "Eyes" by Hitomi Kaji.

=== Digital-only singles ===
List of singles, with selected chart positions
Title	Year	Album
"Hanafurumai"	2015	Yasō Emaki
"Hangeki no Yaiba"	2015	Yasō Emaki
"Strong Fate"	2016	Shikisai
"Valkyrie" (Anime TV Size)	2016	Shikisai
"Okinotayuu"	2017	Shikisai
"Dong Feng Po"	2017	Non-album single
"Dong Feng Po" (Japanese Ver.)	2017	Kiseki Best Collection +
"Singin' for..."	2020	Tokyo Singing
"Sakura Rising" (with Amy Lee of Evanescence)	2020	Tokyo Singing
"Seimei no Aria"	2021	Starlight
"Starlight"	2021	Starlight
"Meisaku Journey"	2021	I vs I
"Phony"	2022	Vocalo Zanmai 2
"EgoRock"	2022	Vocalo Zanmai 2
"Ii Aru Fanclub"	2022	Vocalo Zanmai 2
"The Beast"	2023	I vs I
"Ai ni Homare"	2023	I vs I
"Shura no Gi"	2023	I vs I

== Videography ==
=== Video singles ===
List of media, with selected chart positions
Title	Video details	Peak positions	
Title	Video details	JPN DVD	JPN Blu-ray
Hanabi	Released: August 27, 2014; Label: Avex Trax; Formats: DVD, Blu-ray	8	25
Ikusa/Nadeshikozakura	Released: February 25, 2015; Label: Avex Trax; Formats: DVD, Blu-ray	14	20
Kishikaisei	Released: August 17, 2016; Label: Avex Trax; Formats: DVD, Blu-ray	4	10

=== Video albums ===
List of media, with selected chart positions
Title	Video details	Peak positions	
Title	Video details	JPN DVD	JPN Blu-ray
Vocalo Zanmai Dai Ensōkai	Released: November 26, 2014; Label: Avex Trax; Formats: DVD, Blu-ray	8	23
Wagakki Band Daishinnenkai 2016 Nippon Budokan: Akatsuki no Utage	Released: March 23, 2016; Label: Avex Trax; Formats: DVD, Blu-ray	7	11
Wagakki Band 1st US Tour Shōgeki: Deep Impact	Released: January 25, 2017; Label: Avex Trax; Formats: DVD, Blu-ray	10	41
Wagakki Band Daishinnenkai 2017 Tokyo Taiikukan: Yuki no Utage/Sakura no Utage	Released: June 21, 2017; Label: Avex Trax; Formats: DVD, Blu-ray	2	12
Wagakki Band Daishinnenkai 2018 Yokohama Arena: Ashita e no Kōkai	Released: August 8, 2018; Label: Avex Trax; Formats: DVD, Blu-ray	2	13
Wagakki Band Daishinnenkai 2019 Saitama Super Arena 2 Days: Ryūgū no Tobira	Released: March 20, 2019; Label: Avex Trax; Formats: DVD, Blu-ray	5	10
Manatsu no Daishinnenkai 2020 Yokohama Arena: Tenkyū no Kakehashi	Released: December 9, 2020; Label: Universal Sigma; Formats: DVD, Blu-ray	6	4
Daishinnenkai 2021 Nippon Budokan: Amanoiwato	Released: June 9, 2021; Label: Universal Sigma; Formats: Blu-ray+DVD	—	2
Daishinnenkai 2022 Nippon Budokan: Yasōkenbunroku	Released: April 23, 2022; Label: Universal Sigma; Formats: Blu-ray+2CD, Blu-ray+DVD	—	10
Wagakki Band Daishinnenkai 2024 Nippon Budokan: Yae no Tsubasa	Released: October 9, 2024; Label: Universal Sigma; Formats: Blu-ray+DVD	—	TBA
"—" denotes a recording that did not chart or was not released in that territory.
