= Kiseki Best Collection II =

Compilation album by Wagakki Band
- Released: March 25, 2020
- Recorded: 2013–2018
- Genre: J-pop; heavy metal; folk rock
- Length: 99:23
- Language: Japanese
- Label: Avex Trax

Wagakki Band chronology
React (2019)	Kiseki Best Collection II (2020)	Tokyo Singing (2020)

Kiseki Best Collection II (軌跡 BEST COLLECTION II) is the second compilation album by Japanese band Wagakki Band. It was released on March 25, 2020 by Avex Trax in five editions: two-disc CD only, two music video editions, and two live concert editions with DVD or Blu-ray discs. In addition, a mu-mo Shop exclusive box set was released, featuring both music video and concert DVDs and Blu-ray discs, and a re-release of the band's 2013 mini-album Joshou. The album compiles the band's popular songs from all of their releases during the Avex era.

The album peaked at No. 3 on Oricon's albums chart.

== Track listing ==
All tracks are arranged by Wagakki Band.

Disc 1
No.	Title	Writer(s)	Length
1.	"Rokuchōnen to Ichiya Monogatari" ((六兆年と一夜物語, "A Tale of Six Trillion Years and One Night"))	Kemu	3:57
2.	"Tengaku" ((天樂, "Music of the Heavens"))	Yuuyu-P	5:06
3.	"Senbonzakura" ((千本桜, "A Thousand Sakura"))	Kurousa-P	4:29
4.	"Yoshiwara Lament" (Yoshiwara Ramento (吉原ラメント))	Asa	3:56
5.	"Hanabi" ((華火, "Fireworks"))	Yuko Suzuhana	4:01
6.	"Ikusa" (((戦-ikusa-, "War"))	Asa	3:38
7.	"Nadeshikozakura" ((なでしこ桜))	Suzuhana	4:44
8.	"Akatsuki no Ito" ((暁ノ糸, "The Thread of Dawn"))	Machiya	3:28
9.	"Hangeki no Yaiba" ((反撃の刃, "Counter Blade"))	Machiya	3:38
10.	"Chikyū Saigo no Kokuhaku wo" ((地球最後の告白を, "The Earth's Final Confession"))	Kemu	4:38
11.	"Valkyrie" ((Valkyrie-戦乙女-, "Valkyrie -War Maiden-"))	Asa	4:21
12.	"Strong Fate"	Suzuhana	3:56

Disc 2
No.	Title	Writer(s)	Length
1.	"Kishikaisei" ((起死回生, "Death and Rebirth"))	Kurona	4:11
2.	"Mi-ra-i" ((ミ・ラ・イ, "F-u-t-u-r-e"))	Suzuhana	4:31
3.	"Okinotayuu" ((オキノタユウ, "Albatross"))	Machiya	4:24
4.	"Yuki yo Maichire Sonata ni Mukete" ((雪よ舞い散れ其方に向けて, "Snow Dancing and Falling Towards You"))	Asa	4:16
5.	"Children Record" (Chirudoren Rekōdo (チルドレンレコード))	Jin	3:04
6.	"Amenochi Kanjouron" ((雨のち感情論, "Emotion Theory After the Rain"))	Suzuhana	3:55
7.	"Soko ni Aru kamoshirenai..." ((そこにあるかも知れない・・・, "It May Be There..."))	Cue-Q	3:49
8.	"Synchronicity" (Shinkuronishiti (シンクロニシティ))	Suzuhana	3:55
9.	"Yuki Kageboushi" ((雪影ぼうし, "Snow Silhouette"))	Suzuhana	3:39
10.	"Sasameyuki" ((細雪, "Light Snowfall"))	Machiya	4:00
11.	"Sabaku no Komoriuta" ((砂漠の子守唄, "Desert Lullaby"))	Suzuhana	5:50
12.	"Appare ga Seigi." ((あっぱれが正義。, "Appreciation is Justice."))	Suzuhana	3:53

Music Video Edition DVD 1-2/Blu-ray
No.	Title	Length
1.	"Rokuchōnen to Ichiya Monogatari" (Music video)
2.	"Tengaku" (Music video)
3.	"Senbonzakura" (Music video)
4.	"Hanabi" (Music video)
5.	"Ikusa" (Music video)
6.	"Nadeshikozakura" (Music video)
7.	"Akatsuki no Ito" (Music video)
8.	"Hangeki no Yaiba" (Music video)
9.	"Valkyrie" (Music video)
10.	"Strong Fate" (Music video)
11.	"Kishikaisei" (Music video)
12.	"Okinotayuu" (Music video)
13.	"Yuki yo Maichire Sonata ni Mukete" (Music video)
14.	"Amenochi Kanjouron" (Music video)
15.	"Synchronicity" (Music video)
16.	"Yuki Kageboushi" (Music video)
17.	"Sasameyuki" (Music video)
18.	"Sabaku no Komoriuta" (Music video)
19.	"Sasameyuki -New Version-" (Music video)
20.	"Appare ga Seigi." (Music video)

Live Video Edition DVD 1-2/Blu-ray
No.	Title	Writer(s)	Event	Length
1.	"Rokuchōnen to Ichiya Monogatari"	Kemu	"Vocalo Zanmai Dai Ensoukai" @ Akasaka Blitz, August 27, 2014
2.	"Tengaku"	yu-yu	"Wagakki Band Daishinnenkai 2014 -Wagakki Band Battle-" @ Shibuya Club Asia, January 31, 2014
3.	"Senbonzakura"	Kurousa-P	"Heian Jingu Solo Dedication Live in Wagakki Summit 2017" @ Heian Jingu, August 6, 2017
4.	"Yoshiwara Lament"	Asa	"Wagakki Band Daishinnenkai 2018 Yokohama Arena: Ashita e no Kōkai" @ Yokohama Arena, January 27, 2018
5.	"Hanabi"	Suzuhana	"Wagakki Band Daishinnenkai 2015" @ Shibuya Public Hall, January 7, 2015
6.	"Ikusa"	Asa	"Wagakki Band 1st US Tour Shōgeki: Deep Impact" @ House of Blues San Diego, July 14, 2016
7.	"Nadeshikozakura"	Suzuhana	"Wagakki Band Daishinnenkai 2017 Tokyo Taiikukan: Sakura no Utage" @ Tokyo Metropolitan Gymnasium, February 18, 2017
8.	"Akatsuki no Ito"	Machiya	"Wagakki Band Kiseki Best Collection + Special Live" @ Tokyo National Museum, December 3, 2017
9.	"Hangeki no Yaiba"	Machiya	"Wagakki Band 1st JAPAN Tour 2015" @ Hibiya Open-Air Concert Hall, October 11, 2015
10.	"Chikyū Saigo no Kokuhaku wo"	Kemu	"Wagakki Band Daishinnenkai 2016 Nippon Budokan: Akatsuki no Utage" @ Nippon Budokan, January 6, 2016
11.	"Valkyrie -Ikusa Otome-"	Asa	"Wagakki Band Japan Tour 2016 Gorgeous Wagakki Performance" @ Zepp Diver City Tokyo, May 13, 2016
12.	"Strong Fate"	Suzuhana	"Wagakki Band Daishinnenkai 2019 Saitama Super Arena 2 Days: Ryūgū no Tobira" @ Saitama Super Arena, January 6, 2019
13.	"Kishikaisei"	Kurona	"Wagakki Band Daishinnenkai 2017 Tokyo Taiikukan: Sakura no Utage" @ Tokyo Metropolitan Gymnasium, February 18, 2017
14.	"Mi-ra-i"	Suzuhana	"JTB presents Nikkō Tōshō-gū Gojunza 400th Anniversary Wagakki Band Solo Performance" @ Nikkō Tōshō-gū, June 26, 2016
15.	"Oki no Tayuu"	Machiya	"Wagakki Band Premium Symphonic Night-Live & Orchestra-in Osaka-jō Hall" @ Osaka-jō Hall, February 18, 2018
16.	"Yuki yo Maichire Sonata ni Mukete"	Asa	"Wagakki Band Daishinnenkai 2017 Tokyo Taiikukan: Sakura no Utage" @ Tokyo Metropolitan Gymnasium, February 18, 2017
17.	"Children Record"	Jin	"Wagakki Band Taipei Grand Concert-Premium Encore-" @ ATT Show Box, May 10, 2015
18.	"Amenochi Kanjyoron"	Suzuhana	"Wagakki Band Hall Tour 2017 Shiki no Irodori-" @ Tokyo International Forum Hall A, July 21, 2017
19.	"Synchronicity"	Suzuhana	"Wagakki Band Daishinnenkai 2018 -Ashita e no Kōkai-" @ Yokohama Arena, January 27, 2018
20.	"Yuki Kageboushi"	Suzuhana	"Wagakki Band Tour 2018 -Oto no Kairou-" @ Tokyo International Forum Hall A, July 16, 2018
21.	"Sasameyuki"	Machiya	"Wagakki Band Daishinnenkai 2019 Saitama Super Arena 2days ~ Ryugu no Tobira ~" @ Saitama Super Arena, January 6, 2019
22.	"Sabaku no Komoriuta"	Suzuhana	"36th World Heritage Theater - Munakata Taisha - Wagakki Band Solo Dedication Live" @ Munakata Taisha, September 15, 2018
23.	"Appare ga Seigi."	Suzuhana	"Wagakki Band Daishinnenkai 2019 Saitama Super Arena 2days ~ Ryugu no Tobira ~" @ Saitama Super Arena, January 6, 2019

Box set exclusive Mini Album "Joshou."
No.	Title	Writer(s)	Length
1.	"Tengaku"	yu-yu
2.	"Tsuki Kage Mai Ka" ((月・影・舞・華, "Moon Shadow Dance Flower"))	Gingahōmen P
3.	"Niji-iro Chōchō" ((虹色蝶々, "Rainbow-colored Butterfly"))	Kurousa-P
4.	"Rokuchōnen to Ichiya Monogatari"	Kemu
5.	"Senbonzakura"	Kurousa-P

== Personnel ==
- Yuko Suzuhana – vocals
- Machiya – guitar
- Beni Ninagawa – tsugaru shamisen
- Kiyoshi Ibukuro – koto
- Asa – bass
- Daisuke Kaminaga – shakuhachi
- Wasabi – drums
- Kurona – wadaiko

== Charts ==
Chart (2020)	Peak position
Japanese Albums (Oricon)	4
Japanese Hot Albums (Billboard)	6
Japanese Top Albums Sales (Billboard)	4
J-Pop Albums (Taiwan)	2
