= Wagakki Band Daishinnenkai =

Wagakki Band Daishinnenkai are releases by Wagakki Band and may refer to:

- Wagakki Band Daishinnenkai 2016 Nippon Budokan: Akatsuki no Utage
- Wagakki Band Daishinnenkai 2017 Tokyo Taiikukan: Yuki no Utage/Sakura no Utage
- Wagakki Band Daishinnenkai 2018 Yokohama Arena: Ashita e no Kōkai
- Wagakki Band Daishinnenkai 2019 Saitama Super Arena 2 Days: Ryūgū no Tobira

== See also ==
- Daishinnenkai 2021 Nippon Budokan: Amanoiwato
