= Kiseki Best Collection + =

Compilation album by Wagakki Band
- Released: November 29, 2017
- Recorded: 2013–2017
- Genre: J-pop; heavy metal; folk rock
- Length: 75:37
- Language: Japanese
- Label: Avex Trax

Wagakki Band chronology
Shikisai (2017)	Kiseki Best Collection + (2017)	Otonoe (2018)

Singles from Kiseki Best Collection +
- 1. "Amenochi Kanjyoron" Released: September 6, 2017; 2. "Dong Feng Po (Japanese Ver.)" Released: September 29, 2017

Music video
- Kiseki Best Collection + trailer on YouTube

Kiseki Best Collection + (軌跡 BEST COLLECTION+) is the first compilation album by Japanese band Wagakki Band. It was released on November 29, 2017 by Avex Trax in five editions: CD only, two music video editions, and two live concert editions with two DVDs or one Blu-ray disc. The live concert editions feature the Wagakki Band Hall Tour 2017: Shiki no Irodori show. In addition, a mu-mo Shop exclusive box set was released, featuring both music video and concert DVDs and Blu-ray discs, and a bonus two-disc DVD of the Wagakki Band Heian Jingū Tandoku Hōnō Live in Wagakki Summit 2017 show. The album compiles the band's popular songs from their first three albums and includes five new songs.

The album peaked at No. 3 on Oricon's albums chart and was certified Gold by the RIAJ.

== Track listing ==
All tracks are arranged by Wagakki Band.

CD
No.	Title	Writer(s)	Length
1.	"Rokuchōnen to Ichiya Monogatari" ((六兆年と一夜物語, "A Tale of Six Trillion Years and One Night"))	Kemu	3:57
2.	"Tengaku" ((天樂, "Music of the Heavens"))	Yuuyu-P	5:06
3.	"Senbonzakura" ((千本桜, "A Thousand Sakura"))	Kurousa-P	4:29
4.	"Hanabi" ((華火, "Fireworks"))	Yuko Suzuhana	4:01
5.	"Ikusa" (((戦-ikusa-, "War"))	Asa	3:38
6.	"Nadeshikozakura" ((なでしこ桜))	Suzuhana	4:44
7.	"Akatsuki no Ito" ((暁ノ糸, "The Thread of Dawn"))	Machiya	3:28
8.	"Hangeki no Yaiba" ((反撃の刃, "Counter Blade"))	Machiya	3:38
9.	"Valkyrie" ((Valkyrie-戦乙女-, "Valkyrie -War Maiden-"))	Asa	4:21
10.	"Strong Fate"	Suzuhana	3:56
11.	"Kishikaisei" ((起死回生, "Death and Rebirth"))	Kurona	4:10
12.	"Okinotayuu" ((オキノタユウ, "Albatross"))	Machiya	4:22
13.	"Yuki yo Maichire Sonata ni Mukete" ((雪よ舞い散れ其方に向けて, "Snow Dancing and Falling Towards To You"))	Asa	4:16
14.	"Amenochi Kanjouron" ((雨のち感情論, "Emotion Theory After the Rain"))	Suzuhana	3:55
15.	"Hana Ichimonme" ((花一匁))	Kiyoshi Ibukuro; Suzuhana	3:51
16.	"Hakushu Kassai" ((拍手喝采, "Applause"))	Kurona	4:30
17.	"Synchronicity" (Shinkuronishiti (シンクロニシティ))	Suzuhana	3:54
18.	"Dong Feng Po (Japanese Version)" (Don Fen Po -Nihongo Bājon- (東風破 -日本語バージョン-))	Vincent Fang	5:19
Total length:			75:37

Music Video Edition DVD 1-2/Blu-ray
No.	Title	Length
1.	"Rokuchōnen to Ichiya Monogatari" (Music video)
2.	"Tengaku" (Music video)
3.	"Senbonzakura" (Music video)
4.	"Hanabi" (Music video)
5.	"Ikusa" (Music video)
6.	"Nadeshikozakura" (Music video)
7.	"Akatsuki no Ito" (Music video)
8.	"Hangeki no Yaiba" (Music video)
9.	"Valkyrie" (Music video)
10.	"Strong Fate" (Music video)
11.	"Kishikaisei" (Music video)
12.	"Oki no Tayuu" (Music video)
13.	"Yuki yo Maichire Sonata ni Mukete" (Music video)
14.	"Amenochi Kanjouron" (Music video)
15.	"Clean" (Music video)
16.	"Synchronicity" (Music video)

Live Video Edition DVD 1-2/Blu-ray
No.	Title	Writer(s)	Length
1.	"Overture ~Kumoi no Sora~" ((Overture～雲居ノ空～))
2.	"Tori no Yō ni" ((鳥のように, "Like a Bird"))	Suzuhana
3.	"Ukiyo Heavy Life" ((浮世heavy life, "World Heavy Life"))	Asa
4.	"Howling"	Machiya
5.	"Yuki yo Maichire Sonata ni Mukete"	Asa
6.	"Hotarubi" ((蛍火, "Fireflies"))	Machiya
7.	"Tōno Monogatari Yon-yon" ((遠野物語四四, "Tono Story 44"))	Beni Ninagawa
8.	"Chie no Kajitsu" ((知恵の果実, "Fruits of Wisdom"))	Machiya
9.	"Somosan Seppa" ((什麼生説破, "What Do You Say?"))	Kurona; Daisuke Kaminaga; Ninagawa
10.	"Moon Shine"	Kurona
11.	"Ikusa"	Asa
12.	"Bougetsu" ((望月, "Full Moon"))	Wasabi
13.	"Senbonzakura"	Kurousa-P
14.	"Watashi Shijō Shugi" ("My Supreme Principle" (ワタシ・至上主義))	Ninagawa
15.	"Mi-ra-i" ((ミ・ラ・イ, "F-u-t-u-r-e"))	Suzuhana
16.	"Okinotayuu"	Machiya
17.	"Dageki Sakebien" ((打撃叫宴, "Strike Scream"))	Kurona; Wasabi
18.	"Kishikaisei"	Kurona
19.	"Sora no Kiwami e" ((空の極みへ, "To the Limit of the Sky"))	Ibukuro; Cue-Q
20.	"Ryūsei" ((流星, "Falling Stars"))	Machiya
21.	"Amenochi Kanjouron"	Suzuhana
22.	"Akatsuki no Ito"	Machiya
23.	"Clean"	Asa

Box Set Edition DVD Disc 5
No.	Title	Writer(s)	Length
1.	"Overture ~Utsusemi no Tō~" ((Overture～空蝉ノ燈～, Overture ~Sky Lantern~))
2.	"Kyoto Higashiyama (Shigin)" ((京都東山(詩吟)))
3.	"Fūrin no Utautai" ((風鈴の唄うたい, "Sing with the Wind Chimes"))	Suzuhana
4.	"Iroha Uta" ((いろは唄, "Iroha Song"))	Ginsaku
5.	"Yoshiwara Lament" (Yoshiwara Ramento (吉原ラメント))	Asa
6.	"Hanabi"	Suzuhana
7.	"Senbonzakura"	Kurousa-P
8.	"Hotarubi" ((蛍火, "Fireflies"))	Machiya
9.	"Tōno monogatari: Kyū-yon" ((遠野物語：九四, "Tono Story: 94"))	Asa; Kurona
10.	"Yami ni Kirameku" ((闇に煌めく, "Glitter in the Darkness"))	Kaminaga; Kurona; Ninagawa
11.	"Hoshizukiyo" ((星月夜, "Starry Night"))	Machiya

Box Set Edition DVD Disc 6
No.	Title	Writer(s)	Length
1.	"Sanju no Shutei ni Asobu (Shigin)" ((三樹の酒亭に遊ぶ (詩吟)))
2.	"Okinotayuu"	Machiya
3.	"Drums x Wadaiko Battle" ((DRUMS × 和太鼓バトル))	Wasabi; Kurona
4.	"Sora no Kiwami e" ((空の極みへ, "To the Limit of the Sky"))	Ibukuro; Cue-Q
5.	"Kishikaisei"	Machiya
6.	"Amenochi Kanjouron" ((雨のち感情論, "Emotion Theory After the Rain"))	Suzuhana
7.	"Akatsuki no Ito"	Machiya

== Personnel ==
- Yuko Suzuhana – vocals
- Machiya – guitar
- Beni Ninagawa – tsugaru shamisen
- Kiyoshi Ibukuro – koto
- Asa – bass
- Daisuke Kaminaga – shakuhachi
- Wasabi – drums
- Kurona – wadaiko

== Charts ==
Chart (2017)	Peak position
Japanese Albums (Oricon)	3
Japanese Hot Albums (Billboard)	3
Japanese Top Albums Sales (Billboard)	3

== Certification ==
Region	Certification	Certified units/sales
Japan (RIAJ)	Gold	100,000^{^}
^{^} Shipments figures based on certification alone.
