= All Time Best Album Thanks: Yasō no Oto =

Compilation album by Wagakki Band
- Released: October 9, 2024
- Recorded: 2019–2024
- Genre: J-pop; heavy metal; folk rock
- Language: Japanese; English
- Label: Universal Sigma

Wagakki Band chronology
I vs I (2023)	All Time Best Album Thanks: Yasō no Oto (2024)

Music video
- All Time Best Album Thanks: Yasou no Oto all songs digest on YouTube

All Time Best Album Thanks: Yasō no Oto (ALL TIME BEST ALBUM THANKS 〜八奏ノ音〜, Octet Songs) is the third compilation album by Japanese band Wagakki Band. It was released on October 9, 2024, by Universal Sigma in three editions: two-disc CD only, CD with documentary DVD, and CD with live Blu-ray. The album commemorates the 10th anniversary of Wagakki Band and consists of 18 tracks from the band's discography, including two new songs and six re-recordings as voted by fans on the band's website. This is the band's final album before going on hiatus.

The album peaked at No. 3 on Oricon's Weekly Albums Chart and Billboard Japan's Hot Albums Chart.

== Track listing ==
All tracks are written by Machiya, except where indicated; all tracks are arranged by Wagakki Band.

2CD (Album and instrumental discs) track listing
No.	Title	Writer(s)	Length
1.	"Rokuchōnen to Ichiya Monogatari" (六兆年と一夜物語 ("A Tale of Six Trillion Years and One Night"); re-recording)	Kemu
2.	"Senbonzakura" (千本桜 ("A Thousand Sakura"); re-recording)	Kurousa-P
3.	"Hanabi" (華火 ("Fireworks"); re-recording)	Yuko Suzuhana
4.	"Kishikaisei" (起死回生 ("Death and Rebirth"); re-recording)	Kurona
5.	"Amenochi Kanjōron" (雨のち感情論 ("Emotion Theory After the Rain"); re-recording)	Suzuhana
6.	"Sasameyuki" (細雪 ("Light Snowfall"); re-recording)
7.	"Ignite"
8.	"Jōkei Effector" (情景エフェクター (Jōkei Efekutā, "Effector of Life"))	Asa
9.	"Singin' for..."	Wasabi
10.	"Gekka Bijin" (月下美人 ("(lit. "Moonlit Beauty") Queen of the Night"))	Suzuhana
11.	"Sakura Rising" (featuring Amy Lee of Evanescence)	Lee; Machiya; Suzuhana
12.	"Nichirin" (日輪 ("Sun"))
13.	"Seimei no Aria" (生命のアリア ("Aria of Life"))
14.	"Starlight" (I vs I Ver.)
15.	"Blue Daisy" (ブルーデイジー (Burū Deijī))
16.	"The Beast"
17.	"Gift"
18.	"Yasō Emaki" (八奏絵巻 ("Octet Picture Scroll"))

Limited edition Document version DVD
No.	Title	Length
1.	"Behind the Scenes Documentary"

Limited edition Live version Blu-ray
No.	Title	Writer(s)	Event	Length
1.	"Senbonzakura"	Kurousa-P	clubasia, January 31, 2014
2.	"Ikusa" ((戦-ikusa- ("War"))	Asa	MetRock 2015, May 23, 2015
3.	"Hangeki no Yaiba" (反撃の刃 ("Counter Blade"))		NHK E-Tele Law of R, September 10, 2015
4.	"Kishikaisei"	Kurona	Rising Sun Rock Festival 2016, August 13, 2016
5.	"Amenochi Kanjōron"	Suzuhana	NHK Shibuya no Oto, September 13, 2017
6.	"Senbonzakura"	Kurousa-P	Inazuma Rock Festival 2018, September 22, 2018
7.	"Akatsuki no Ito" (暁ノ糸 ("The Thread of Dawn"))		Wagakki Band Japan Tour 2019 React ~New Chapter~ Final, November 23, 2019
8.	"Hakanaku mo Utsukushii no wa" (儚くも美しいのは ("What is Ephemeral and Beautiful"))		Premium Symphonic Night Vol.2 ~ Live & Orchestra ~ in Osaka-jō Hall, February 16, 2020
9.	"Ignite"		Manatsu no Daishinnenkai 2020 Yokohama Arena: Tenkyū no Kakehashi, August 16, 2020
10.	"Starlight"		NHK Songs of Tokyo, May 14, 2021
11.	"Yoshiwara Lament" (吉原ラメント (Yoshiwara Ramento))	Asa	Daishinnenkai 2022 Nippon Budokan: Yasōkenbunroku, January 9, 2022
12.	"Seimei no Aria"		Wagakki Band Japan Tour 2023 I vs I, September 7, 2023
13.	"Sasameyuki"		Wagakki Band Japan Tour 2023 I vs I, September 7, 2023
14.	"The Beast"		Daishinnenkai 2024 Nippon Budokan: Yae no Tsubasa, January 7, 2024

== Personnel ==
- Yuko Suzuhana – vocals
- Machiya – guitar
- Beni Ninagawa – tsugaru shamisen
- Kiyoshi Ibukuro – koto
- Asa – bass
- Daisuke Kaminaga – shakuhachi
- Wasabi – drums
- Kurona – wadaiko

== Charts ==
Chart performance for All Time Best Album Thanks: Yasō No Oto
Chart (2024)	Peak position
Japanese Albums (Oricon)	3
Japanese Digital Albums (Oricon)	2
Japanese Hot Albums (Billboard Japan)	3
