= Starlight (EP) =

EP by Wagakki Band
- Released: June 9, 2021
- Recorded: 2020
- Genre: J-pop; heavy metal; folk rock
- Language: Japanese
- Label: Universal Sigma

Wagakki Band chronology
Tokyo Singing (2020)	Starlight (2021)	Vocalo Zanmai 2 (2022)

Singles from Starlight
- 1. "Seimei no Aria" Released: February 5, 2021; 2. "Starlight" Released: May 4, 2021

Music video
- Tokyo Singing Tokyo Garden Theater Live digest on YouTube

Alternate cover
- Mars Red First Edition cover

Starlight is the second EP by Japanese band Wagakki Band, released on June 9, 2021, by Universal Sigma in three editions: CD only, Mars Red First Edition with DVD, and Tokyo Singing First Edition with Blu-ray. In addition, an Official Fan Club exclusive box set with all versions will be released. The Tokyo Singing First Edition concert Blu-ray features the band's concert from the 2020 tour show at Tokyo Garden Theater. The track "Seimei no Aria" was used as the opening theme of the anime TV series Mars Red, while the title track was the ending theme of the Fuji TV drama series Ichikei no Karasu.

The EP peaked at No. 5 on Oricon's albums chart.

== Track listing ==
All tracks are written by Machiya, except where indicated; all tracks are arranged by Wagakki Band.

CD
No.	Title	Length
1.	"Starlight"
2.	"Seimei no Aria" ((生命のアリア; "Aria of Life"))
3.	"Blue Daisy" (Burū Deijī (ブルーデイジー))
4.	"Ameagari no Parade" (Ameagari no Parēdo (雨上がりのパレード; "Post-Rain Parade"))

CD Only release bonus tracks
No.	Title	Length
5.	"Starlight" (Instrumental)
6.	"Seimei no Aria" (Instrumental)
7.	"Blue Daisy" (Instrumental)
8.	"Ameagari no Parade" (Instrumental)

Mars Red First Edition DVD
No.	Title	Length
1.	"Seimei no Aria (Mars Red Ver.)" (Music video)
2.	"Seimei no Aria (Wagakki Band Ver.)" (Music video)
3.	"Seimei no Aria (Wagakki Band Ver.)" (Behind the Scenes)

Tokyo Singing First Edition Live Blu-ray
No.	Title	Writer(s)	Length
1.	"Overture ~Tokyo Singing~"
2.	"Calling"
3.	"Ignite"
4.	"Reload Dead"	Asa
5.	"Ikitoshi Ikeru Hana" ((生きとしいける花; "Living Flowers"))	Yuko Suzuhana
6.	"Gekkabijin" ((月下美人; "Queen of the Night"))	Suzuhana
7.	"Sakura Rising" (feat. Amy Lee of Evanescence)	Lee; Machiya; Suzuhana
8.	"Guernica" (Gerunika (ゲルニカ))
9.	"Setsuna" ((刹那))
10.	"Iki Kaketa Yume no Atogaki" ((生きかけた夢のあとがき; "After a Dream I Lived in"))
11.	"Jinsenpuu" ((塵旋風; "Hurricane Demon"))
12.	"Homura" ((焔; "Flame"))	Machiya; Asa; Wasabi
13.	"Tokyo Sensation"	Suzuhana
14.	"Origami-ism" (Origami-izumu (オリガミイズム))	Kurona
15.	"Atena no Nai Tegami" ((宛名のない手紙; "A Letter with No Name"))	Suzuhana
16.	"Drum Wadaiko Battle ~Kyoei Todoroki Bullet/Kai ~" ((ドラム和太鼓バトル〜響映轟弾・改〜))	Wasabi; Kurona
17.	"Nichirin" ((日輪; "Sun Wheel"))
18.	"Eclipse"
19.	"Singin' for..."	Wasabi
20.	"EN1. ROKI" ((EN1. ロキ))	Mikito-P
21.	"EN2. Senbonzakura" ((EN2. 千本桜; "EN2. A Thousand Sakura"))	Kurousa-P

== Personnel ==
- Yuko Suzuhana – vocals
- Machiya – guitar
- Beni Ninagawa – tsugaru shamisen
- Kiyoshi Ibukuro – koto
- Asa – bass
- Daisuke Kaminaga – shakuhachi
- Wasabi – drums
- Kurona – wadaiko

== Charts ==
Chart (2020)	Peak position
Japanese Albums (Oricon)	5
Japanese Hot Albums (Billboard)	8
Japanese Top Download Albums (Billboard)	2
