= Vocalo Zanmai 2 =

Studio album by Wagakki Band
- Released: August 17, 2022
- Recorded: 2022
- Studio: Aobadai Studio; Prime Sound Studio Form
- Genre: J-pop; heavy metal; folk rock
- Length: 36:45 (CD-only release)
- Language: Japanese
- Label: Universal Sigma

Wagakki Band chronology
Starlight (2021)	Vocalo Zanmai 2 (2022)	I vs I (2023)

Singles from Vocalo Zanmai 2
- 1. "Phony" Released: July 1, 2022; 2. "EgoRock" Released: July 22, 2022; 3. "Ii Aru Fanclub" Released: August 5, 2022

Music video
- Vocalo Zanmai 2 all songs digest on YouTube

First-Press Limited Vocalo Edition cover

Vocalo Zanmai 2 (ボカロ三昧2, Bokaro Zanmai Tsū) is the sixth studio album by Japanese band Wagakki Band. It was released on August 17, 2022, through Universal Sigma in five editions: a two-CD release with an instrumental disc, streaming, the First-Press Limited ∞ Edition with the 8th Anniversary Japan Tour ∞ -Infinity- Blu-ray, the First-Press Limited Vocalo Edition with a bonus track and a documentary DVD, and the Shin Yaeryu (FC Limited) Edition box set, which combines all physical media editions with nine extra DVDs. Like the band's 2014 debut album, Vocalo Zanmai consists of Vocaloid (and two CeVIO) songs covered in the band's style of mixing traditional Japanese musical instruments (wagakki) with heavy metal.

The album peaked at No. 4 on Oricon's albums chart.

== Track listing ==
All tracks are arranged by Wagakki Band.

2CD (Album and instrumental discs)
No.	Title	Writer(s)	Original voice synthesizer and composer	Length
1.	"Phony" (Fonī (フォニイ))	Tsumiki	Tsumiki feat. Kafu	3:11
2.	"EgoRock" (Egorokku (エゴロック))	Surii	Surii feat. Kagamine Len	2:51
3.	"Marshall Maximizer" (Māsharu Makishimaizā (マーシャル・マキシマイザー))	Hiiragi Magnetite	Hiiragi Magnetite feat. Kafu	2:46
4.	"Surges"	Orangestar	Orangestar feat. IA and Hatsune Miku	2:26
5.	"Amanojaku" ((天ノ弱; "Heaven's Weakness"))	164	164 feat. GUMI	3:06
6.	"Venom" (Benomu (ベノム))	Kairiki Bear	Kairiki Bear feat. Flower	3:33
7.	"Akahitoha" ((紅一葉; "One Crimson Leaf"))	Kurousa-P	Kurousa-P feat. Megurine Luka	4:15
8.	"Identity" (Aidentiti (アイデンティティ))	Kanaria	Kanaria feat. GUMI and Hatsune Miku	2:36
9.	"Goodbye Sengen" (Gubbai Sengen (グッバイ宣言; "Goodbye Declaration"))	Chinozo	Chinozo feat. Flower	2:54
10.	"Chimera" (Kimera (キメラ))	Deco*27	Deco*27 feat. Hatsune Miku	2:48
11.	"Ii Aru Fanclub" (Yī Èr (Ī Aru) Fankurabu (いーあるふぁんくらぶ; "1, 2 Fanclub"))	Mikito-P	Mikito-P feat. GUMI and Kagamine Rin	3:58

Digital disc bonus track
No.	Title	Writer(s)	Length
12.	"Dokuzu" (Do Kuzu (ド屑; "Trash"))	Nakiso	2:22
Total length:			36:44

First-Press Limited Vocalo Edition bonus track
No.	Title	Writer(s)	Original voice synthesizer and composer	Length
12.	"Fire Flower"	halyosy	halyosy feat. Kagamine Len	2:23
Total length:				36:45

First-Press Limited ∞ Edition Blu-ray: 8th Anniversary Japan Tour ∞ -Infinity- (Tachikawa Stage Garden)
No.	Title	Writer(s)	Length
1.	"Overture ~Infinity~"
2.	"Starlight"	Machiya
3.	"Seimei no Aria" (生命のアリア, "Aria of Life")	Machiya
4.	"Senbonzakura" (千本桜, "A Thousand Sakura")	Kurousa-P
5.	"Gekkabijin" (月下美人, "Queen of the Night")	Yuko Suzuhana
6.	"Blue Daisy" (ブルーデイジー, Burū Deijī)	Machiya
7.	"Togakubi" (咎首, "Neck")	Machiya
8.	"Ouroboros: 1st Movement" (ウロボロス～ouroboros～ 第一楽章, Uroborosu ~ Dai-ichi Gakushō)
9.	"Ouroboros: 2nd Movement" (ウロボロス～ouroboros～ 第二楽章, Uroborosu ~ Dai-ni Gakushō)
10.	"Ouroboros: 3rd Movement" (ウロボロス～ouroboros～ 第三楽章, Uroborosu ~ Dai-san Gakushō)
11.	"Yoshiwara Lament" (吉原ラメント, Yoshiwara Ramento)	Asa
12.	"Roki" (ロキ)	Mikito-P
13.	"Meisaku Journey" (名作ジャーニー, Meisaku Jānī, "Masterpiece Journey")	Suzuhana; Kiyoshi Ibukuro
14.	"Drums & Wadaiko Battle: Archipelago Showdown ~Crush~" (ドラム和太鼓バトル・対決列島～砕打～, Doramu to Wadaiko Batoru Taiketsu Rettō ~Saiyuchi~)	Wasabi; Kurona
15.	"Nichirin" (日輪, "Sun Wheel")	Machiya
16.	"Ameagari no Parade" (雨上がりのパレード, Ameagari no Parēdo, "Post-Rain Parade")	Machiya
17.	"Ignite"	Machiya
18.	"Ikitoshi Ikeru Hana" (生きとしいける花, "All Living Flowers")	Suzuhana
19.	"Singin' for..."	Wasabi

== Personnel ==
- Yuko Suzuhana – vocals
- Machiya – guitar, vocals (track 6), backing vocals
- Beni Ninagawa – tsugaru shamisen
- Kiyoshi Ibukuro – koto
- Asa – bass
- Daisuke Kaminaga – shakuhachi
- Wasabi – drums
- Kurona – wadaiko, kakegoe vocals (track 11)

== Charts ==
Chart (2022)	Peak position
Japanese Albums (Oricon)	4
Japanese Hot Albums (Billboard)	4
Japanese Top Albums Sales (Billboard)	4
Japanese Top Download Albums (Billboard)	3
