= Wagakki Band Daishinnenkai 2024 Nippon Budokan: Yae no Tsubasa =

Video by Wagakki Band
- Released: October 9, 2024
- Recorded: January 7, 2024
- Venue: Nippon Budokan
- Genre: J-pop; heavy metal; folk rock
- Language: Japanese
- Label: Universal Sigma

Wagakki Band chronology
Daishinnenkai 2022 Nippon Budokan: Yasoukenbunroku (2021)	Wagakki Band Daishinnenkai 2024 Nippon Budokan: Yae no Tsubasa (2024)

Music video
- Wagakki Band Daishinnenkai 2024 Nippon Budokan: Yae no Tsubasa digest on YouTube

Wagakki Band Daishinnenkai 2024 Nippon Budokan: Yae no Tsubasa (和楽器バンド 大新年会2024 日本武道館 ～八重ノ翼～, Wagakki Band New Year's Party 2024 Nippon Budokan ~Double Wings~) is the 10th live video album by Japanese band Wagakki Band, released on October 9, 2024, by Universal Sigma in two editions: Standard Blu-ray + DVD and Limited Edition Blu-ray + DVD + 60-page photo book. The video covers the band's annual New Year concert at the Nippon Budokan on January 7, 2024. This is the band's final video release before going on hiatus.

== Track listing ==
All tracks are arranged by Wagakki Band.

Blu-ray
No.	Title	Writer(s)	Length
1.	"Overture ~Yae no Tsubasa~" ((Overture～八重ノ翼～, "Overture ~Double Wings~"))
2.	"Ai ni Homare" ((愛に誉れ, "Honor of Love"))	Yuko Suzuhana
3.	"Amenochi Kanjouron" ((雨のち感情論, "Emotion Theory After the Rain"))	Suzuhana
4.	"Tengaku" ((天樂, "Music of the Heavens"))	Yuuyu-P
5.	"Phony" (Foni (フォニイ))	Tsumiki
6.	"Ii Aru Fanclub" (Yī Èr (Ī Aru) Fankurabu (いーあるふぁんくらぶ, "1, 2 Fanclub"))	Mikito-P
7.	"Gekka Bijin" ((月下美人, "Queen of the Night"))	Suzuhana
8.	"Sasameyuki" ((細雪, "Light Snowfall"))	Machiya
9.	"Yuki yo Maichire Sonata ni Mukete" ((雪よ舞い散れ其方に向けて, "Snow Dancing and Falling Towards You"))	Asa
10.	"Seimei no Aria" ((生命のアリア, "Aria of Life"))	Machiya
11.	"Kyomu" ((虚無, "Void"))
12.	"Haja no Gi" ((破邪の儀, "Ritual of Extermination"))
13.	"Homura" ((焔, "Flame"))	Machiya; Asa; Wasabi
14.	"Yoshiwara Lament" (Yoshiwara Ramento (吉原ラメント))	Asa
15.	"Okinotayuu" ((オキノタユウ, "Albatross"))	Machiya
16.	"The Beast"	Machiya
17.	"Drums & Wadaiko Battle ~Taiketsu Budokan~" ((ドラム和太鼓バトル～対決武道館, "Drums & Wadaiko Battle ~Showdown at Budokan~"))	Wasabi; Kurona
18.	"Venom" (Benomu (ベノム))	Kairiki Bear
19.	"Hoshi no Gotoku" ((星の如く, "Like a Star"))	Wasabi
20.	"Akatsuki no Ito" ((暁ノ糸, "The Thread of Dawn"))	Machiya
21.	"Brave"	Wasabi
22.	"Senbonzakura" ((千本桜, "A Thousand Sakura"))	Kurousa-P

DVD
No.	Title	Length
1.	"Behind the Scene of Wagakki Band Daishinnenkai 2024 Nippon Budokan: Yae no Tsubasa" ((BEHIND THE SCENE of 和楽器バンド 大新年会2024 日本武道館 ～八重ノ翼～))

== Personnel ==
- Yuko Suzuhana – vocals
- Machiya – guitar
- Beni Ninagawa – tsugaru shamisen
- Kiyoshi Ibukuro – koto
- Asa – bass
- Daisuke Kaminaga – shakuhachi
- Wasabi – drums
- Kurona – wadaiko
