= Wagakki Band 1st US Tour Shōgeki: Deep Impact =

2017 live video album by Wagakki Band

Video by Wagakki Band
- Released: January 25, 2017
- Recorded: July 14, 2016
- Venue: House of Blues, San Diego, California, U.S.
- Genre: J-pop; heavy metal; folk rock
- Language: Japanese
- Label: Avex Trax

Wagakki Band chronology
Kishikaisei (2016)	Wagakki Band 1st US Tour Shōgeki: Deep Impact (2017)	Wagakki Band Daishinnenkai 2017 Tokyo Taiikukan: Yuki no Utage/Sakura no Utage (2017)

Music video
- Wagakki Band 1st US Tour Shōgeki: Deep Impact trailer on YouTube

Wagakki Band 1st US Tour Shōgeki: Deep Impact (WagakkiBand 1st US Tour 衝撃 -DEEP IMPACT-) is the third live video album by Japanese band Wagakki Band, released on January 25, 2017 by Avex Trax in four editions: DVD, Blu-ray, and both editions with additional documentary. In addition, a mu-mo Shop exclusive release includes both documentary editions. The video covers the band's concert at the House of Blues San Diego on July 14, 2016 as part of their first U.S. tour.

The video peaked at No. 10 on Oricon's DVD chart and No. 41 on Oricon's Blu-ray chart.

== Track listing ==
All tracks are arranged by Wagakki Band.

DVD/Blu-ray
No.	Title	Writer(s)	Length
1.	"Rinnetensei" ((輪廻転生, "Reincarnation"))
2.	"Strong Fate"	Yuko Suzuhana
3.	"Tengaku" ((天樂, "Music of the Heavens"))	Yuuyu-P
4.	"Valkyrie" ((Valkyrie‐戦乙女‐))	Asa
5.	"Hanabi" ((華火, "Fireworks"))	Suzuhana
6.	"Hangeki no Yaiba" ((反撃の刃, "Counter Blade"))	Machiya
7.	"Shigin: Koinkun wo Tazunu" ((詩吟 -胡隠君を尋ぬ-))	Suzuhana; Daisuke Kaminaga; Kiyoshi Ibukuro
8.	"Fūrin no Utautai" ((風鈴の唄うたい, "Sing with the Wind Chimes"))	Suzuhana
9.	"Tōno Monogatari: Kyū-yon" ((遠野物語:九四, "Tono Story: 94"))	Asa; Kurona
10.	"Homura" ((焔, "Flame"))	Machiya; Asa; Wasabi
11.	"Hagane" ((鋼 -HAGANE-, "Steel"))	Kurona
12.	"Shiro Madara" ((白斑, "White Rash"))	Machiya
13.	"Yoshiwara Lament" (Yoshiwara Ramento (吉原ラメント))	Asa
14.	"Akatsuki no Ito" ((暁ノ糸, "The Thread of Dawn"))	Machiya
15.	"Drum & Wadaiko Battle" (Doramu ando Wadaiko Batoru (ドラム＆和太鼓バトル))	Wasabi; Kurona
16.	"Hoshizukiyo" ((星月夜, "Starry Night"))	Machiya
17.	"Ikusa" ((戦 -ikusa-, "War"))	Asa
18.	"Kishikaisei" ((起死回生, "Death and Rebirth"))	Kurona
19.	"Senbonzakura" ((千本桜, "A Thousand Sakura"))	Kurousa-P

Documentary Edition bonus track
No.	Title	Length
20.	"US Tour Document" ((US Tour ドキュメント))

== CD version ==
Wagakki Band 1st US Tour Shōgeki: Deep Impact

Live album by Wagakki Band
- Released: February 6, 2017
- Recorded: July 14, 2016
- Venue: House of Blues, San Diego, California, U.S.
- Genre: J-pop; heavy metal; folk rock
- Length: 68:03
- Language: Japanese
- Label: Avex Trax

Wagakki Band chronology
Yasō Emaki (2015)	Wagakki Band 1st US Tour Shōgeki: Deep Impact (2017)	Shikisai (2017)

The audio CD version of this concert was released on February 6, 2017. It peaked at No. 48 on Oricon's albums chart.

=== Track listing ===
All tracks are arranged by Wagakki Band.

No.	Title	Writer(s)	Length
1.	"Rinnetensei"		1:13
2.	"Strong Fate"	Suzuhana	3:58
3.	"Tengaku"	Yuuyu-P	4:54
4.	"Valkyrie"	Asa	4:33
5.	"Hanabi"	Suzuhana	3:44
6.	"Hangeki no Yaiba"	Machiya	3:47
7.	"Shigin: Koinkun wo Tazunu"	Suzuhana; Kaminaga; Ibukuro	2:27
8.	"Fūrin no Utautai"	Suzuhana	4:59
9.	"Homura"	Machiya; Asa; Wasabi	4:23
10.	"Hagane"	Kurona	4:24
11.	"Shiro Madara"	Machiya	3:56
12.	"Yoshiwara Lament"	Asa	4:01
13.	"Akatsuki no Ito"	Machiya	3:49
14.	"Hoshizukiyo"	Machiya	4:08
15.	"Ikusa"	Asa	4:15
16.	"Kishikaisei"	Kurona	4:20
17.	"Senbonzakura"	Kurousa-P	5:13
Total length:			68:03

== Personnel ==
- Yuko Suzuhana – vocals
- Machiya – guitar
- Beni Ninagawa – tsugaru shamisen
- Kiyoshi Ibukuro – koto
- Asa – bass
- Daisuke Kaminaga – shakuhachi
- Wasabi – drums
- Kurona – wadaiko

== Charts ==
Chart (2017)	Peak position
Japanese DVD Sales (Oricon)	10
Blu-ray Sales (Oricon)	41
Japanese Albums (Oricon)	48
