= 60th Japan Record Awards =

2018 Japanese music awards ceremony

- Date: 30 December 2018
- Location: New National Theatre Tokyo, Tokyo, Japan
- Hosted by: Tao Tsuchiya, Shinichiro Azumi

Television/radio coverage
- Network: TBS
- Viewership: 16.7%

The 60th Japan Record Awards was held on 30 December 2018. The Tokyo Broadcasting System Television network televised the show live from the New National Theatre Tokyo in Tokyo. This was the last Heisei-era Japan Record Awards.

== Abstract ==
Nogizaka46 won the Grand Prix in 60th Japan Record Awards for their song "Synchronicity", which is second time for this group. And Nogizakd46 is the second female group won twice Grand Prix of Japan Record Awards, next to AKB48.

== Presents ==
- Tao Tsuchiya
- Shinichiro Azumi (TBS Announcer)

Progress announcer

- Ai Eto (TBS Announcer)
- Yumi Furuya (TBS Announcer)

Radio relay host

- Kengo Komada (TBS Announcer)

== Winners ==
=== Grand Prix ===
- Synchronicity
  - Artist: Nogizaka46
  - Lyrics: Yasushi Akimoto
  - Composition & arranger: Satori Shiraishi
  - music supervisor: Kazuma Ikeda
  - Producer: Yasushi Akimoto

=== Excellent Work Award ===
(also the nomination for Grand Prix)

- Keyakizaka46 - Ambivalent
- Hiroshi Miyama - Igosso Tamashii
- Twice - Wake Me Up
- Sekai no Owari - Sazanka
- Kiyoshi Hikawa - Shōbu no Hanamichi
- Nogizaka46 - Synchronicity
- AKB48 - Teacher Teacher
- Daichi Miura - Be Myself
- Kana Nishino - Bedtime Story
- Da Pump - U.S.A.

=== Best New Artist Award ===
- Yuto Tatsumi

=== New Artist Award ===
(also the nomination for Best New Artist Award)

- Yuto Tatsumi
- STU48
- Chuning Candy
- Bish

=== Best Vocal Award ===
- Misia

=== Special Award ===
- Tetsuya Komuro
- Southern All Stars
- Da Pump
- Kenshi Yonezu

=== The Best Album Award ===
- Kenshi Yonezu - Bootleg

=== Excellent Album Award ===
- The Beatniks - Exitentialist A Xie Xie
- Wagakki Band - Otonoe
- Shinobu Otake - Shinobu avec Piaf
- Hikaru Utada - Hatsukoi

=== Recommendation Award ===
Awarded by the Japan Composer's Association

- Junretsu

=== Achievement Award ===
- Hiromi Sano
- Kazuo Shirane
- Akira Matsushima

=== Special Achievement Award ===
- Takayuki Inoue
- Yûichirô Oda
- Kirin Kiki
- Hideki Saijo
- Norio Maeda
- Kenichiro Morioka

=== Composer Award ===
- Manabu Marutani - The World Is Laughing at You (singer: Little Glee Monster)

=== Lyricist Award ===
- Gorō Matsui - Koimachi Counter (singer: Hiroshi Takeshima) & Winter storm (singer: Keisuke Yamauchi)

=== Arranger Award ===
- Jazzin'park - If you can forgive you (singer: Leo Ieiri)

=== Planning Award ===
- Juju - I
- Akiko Wada with Boys and Men Kenkyusei - Good Luck Love
- Crazy Ken Band - Two People Getting Wet in the Rain
- Youichi Sugawara - Continue to sing for 60 years Looking back Beautiful memory-from 85 years old to you-
- Aya Shimazu - Singer5
- Sukima Switch - Sukimanohana Taba ~ Love Song Selection ~
- Deserie - Doo Wop Nuggets Vol. 1 & Your Tender Lips - Doo Wop Nuggets Vol. 2 & That's My Desire - Doo Wop Nuggets Vol. 3

supervisor: Tatsuro Yamashita

- Kitajima Kyodai - Brother
- Kiyoshi Maekawa - Maekawa Seidai Dictionary

== Guests (Legend Artists) ==
- Sayuri Yoshinaga (4th Grand Prize Laureate)
- Saburō Kitajima (33rd Grand Prize Laureate)
- Takashi Hosokawa (24th and 25th Grand Prize Laureate)
- Pink Lady (20th Grand Prize Laureate)
- Wink (31st Grand Prize Laureate)
