= Tokyo Singing =

Studio album by Wagakki Band
- Released: October 14, 2020
- Recorded: 2019–2020
- Studio: Aobadai Studio; Sound City Setagaya
- Genre: J-pop; heavy metal; folk rock
- Language: Japanese; English
- Label: Universal Sigma

Wagakki Band chronology
Kiseki Best Collection II (2020)	Tokyo Singing (2020)	Starlight (2021)

Singles from Tokyo Singing
- 1. "Singin' for..." Released: August 16, 2020; 2. "Sakura Rising" Released: September 18, 2020

Music video
- Tokyo Singing all songs digest on YouTube

First Edition cover

Tokyo Singing (東京シンギング, Tōkyō Shingingu) is the fifth studio album by Japanese band Wagakki Band. It was released on October 14, 2020 through Universal Sigma in six editions: a two-CD release with an instrumental disc, streaming, a first edition release with 144-page photo book, and three first edition releases with optional DVD or Blu-ray discs. In addition, a fan club exclusive "Shin Yaeryū-ban" (真・⼋重流盤) edition was released, featuring Mini Brokker figures of the eight members and a Blu-ray copy of the "WagakkiBand Japan Tour 2019 React -Shinshō- Final" concert at Yokosuka Arts Theater. The album features "Sakura Rising", a collaboration with Amy Lee of Evanescence.

The album peaked at No. 5 on Oricon's albums chart.

== Track listing ==
All tracks are arranged by Wagakki Band.

2CD (Album and instrumental discs)
No.	Title	Writer(s)	Length
1.	"Calling"	Machiya	4:31
2.	"Ignite"	Machiya	3:32
3.	"Reload Dead"	Asa	5:05
4.	"Ikitoshi Ikeru Hana" ((生きとしいける花, "Living Flowers"))	Yuko Suzuhana	4:06
5.	"Gekka Bijin" ((月下美人, "Queen of the Night"))	Suzuhana	4:41
6.	"Sakura Rising" (feat. Amy Lee of Evanescence)	Lee; Machiya; Suzuhana	3:49
7.	"Guernica" (Gerunika (ゲルニカ))	Machiya	4:11
8.	"Tokyo Sensation"	Suzuhana	3:41
9.	"Origami-ism" (Origami-izumu (オリガミイズム))	Kurona	4:07
10.	"Atena no Nai Tegami" ((宛名のない手紙, "Unaddressed Letter"))	Suzuhana	5:06
11.	"Nichirin" ((日輪, "Sun"))	Machiya	4:26
12.	"Eclipse"	Machiya	5:03
13.	"Singin' for..."	Wasabi	3:45

Digital-only bonus track
No.	Title	Writer(s)	Length
14.	"ROKI" ((ロキ))	Mikito-P

First Edition DVD/Blu-ray - Premium Symphonic Night Vol.2 ~ Live & Orchestra ~ in Osaka-jō Hall
No.	Title	Writer(s)	Length
1.	"Overture"
2.	"Okinotayuu" ((オキノタユウ, "Albatross"))	Machiya
3.	"Sasameyuki" ((細雪, "Light Snowfall"))	Machiya
4.	"Hakanaku mo Utsukushii no wa" ((儚くも美しいのは, "What is Ephemeral and Beautiful"))	Machiya
5.	"Sabaku no Komoriuta" ((砂漠の子守唄, "Desert Lullaby"))	Suzuhana
6.	"Doppo" ((独歩, "Lonely Stroll"))	Machiya
7.	"Amenochi Kanjouron" ((雨のち感情論, "Emotion Theory After the Rain"))	Suzuhana
8.	"Hana Ichi Monme" ((花一匁, "Hana Ichi Monme"))	Kiyoshi Ibukuro; Suzuhana
9.	"Ignite"	Machiya
10.	"Ikusa" ((戦 –ikusa–, "War"))	Asa
11.	"Yoshiwara Lament" (Yoshiwara Ramento (吉原ラメント))	Asa
12.	"Hotarubi" ((蛍火, "Firefly"))	Machiya
13.	"Bring Me to Life" (with Amy Lee of Evanescence)	Lee; Benjamin Moody; David Hodges
14.	"Senbonzakura (with Amy Lee of Evanescence)" ((千本桜, "A Thousand Sakura"))	Kurousa-P
15.	"IZANA"	Suzuhana
16.	"Ryūsei" ((流星, "Falling Stars"))	Machiya

Shin Yaeryū-ban Blu-ray - React Tour Final @ Yokosuka Arts Theater
No.	Title	Writer(s)	Length
1.	"Overture ~ReAct~"
2.	"Amenochi Kanjouron"	Suzuhana
3.	"Tengaku" ((天樂, "Music of the Heavens"))	Yuuyu-P
4.	"Yoshiwara Lament"	Asa
5.	"Kagerō" ((蜉蝣, "Mayfly"))	Machiya
6.	"Strong Fate"	Suzuhana
7.	"Sasameyuki"	Machiya
8.	"Kyōka Suigetsu" ((鏡花水月))	Machiya
9.	"Tsuki ni Sakebu Yoru" ((月に叫ぶ夜, "Screaming at the Moon at Night"))	Kurona
10.	"Nadeshikozakura" ((なでしこ桜))	Suzuhana
11.	"Synchronicity" (Shinkuronishiti (シンクロニシティ))	Suzuhana
12.	"Kyokugen Sōuchi" ((極限双打, "Extreme Double Strike"))	Machiya
13.	"Yuki Kageboushi" ((雪影ぼうし, "Snow Silhouette"))	Suzuhana
14.	"Akatsuki no Ito" ((暁ノ糸, "The Thread of Dawn"))	Machiya
15.	"Appare ga Seigi." ((あっぱれが正義。, "Appreciation is Justice."))	Suzuhana
16.	"Ignite"	Machiya
17.	"Senbonzakura"	Kurousa-P

== Personnel ==
- Yuko Suzuhana – vocals
- Machiya – guitar, vocals (tracks 2, 7, 12, 14), backing vocals
- Beni Ninagawa – tsugaru shamisen
- Kiyoshi Ibukuro – koto
- Asa – bass
- Daisuke Kaminaga – shakuhachi
- Wasabi – drums
- Kurona – wadaiko, kakegoe vocals (track 9)

feat.

- Amy Lee – vocals (track 6)

== Charts ==
Chart (2020)	Peak position
Japanese Albums (Oricon)	5
Japanese Hot Albums (Billboard)	3
Japanese Top Albums Sales (Billboard)	2
Japanese Top Download Albums (Billboard)	1
J-Pop Albums (Taiwan)	2
