= 57th Japan Record Awards =

2015 Japanese music awards ceremony

- Date: December 30, 2015
- Venue: New National Theater, Tokyo
- Country: Japan
- Hosted by: Shin'ichirō Azumi, Yukie Nakama
- Website: http://www.tbs.co.jp/recordaward/index-j.html

Television/radio coverage
- Network: TBS

The 57th Japan Record Awards (第57回日本レコード大賞) took place at the New National Theater in Tokyo on December 30, 2015. The ceremony was televised in Japan on TBS.

== Presenters ==
- Shin'ichirō Azumi (TBS announcer)
- Yukie Nakama

== Winners and winning works ==
=== Grand Prix ===
- Sandaime J Soul Brothers from Exile Tribe — "Unfair World"

=== Best Singer Award ===
- Seiko Matsuda

=== Best New Artist Award ===
- Magnolia Factory

=== Excellent Work Award ===
- AAA — "Aishiteru no ni, Aisenai"
- Mariya Nishiuchi — "Arigatou Forever..."
- Sandaime J Soul Brothers from Exile Tribe — "Unfair World"
- Kiyoshi Hikawa — "Itoshi no Tekīro"
- Hiroshi Miyama — "Oiwaki Yama"
- Kana Nishino — "Torisetsu"
- AKB48 — "Bokutachi wa Tatakawanai"
- Kyary Pamyu Pamyu — "Mondai Girl"
- Kaori Mizumori — "Yamatoji no Koi"
- Gesu no Kiwami Otome — "Watashi Igai Watashi Ja Nai no"

=== New Artist Award ===
- lol
- Magnolia Factory
- Natsumi Hanaoka
- Rei Yasuda

=== Best Album Award ===
- Southern All Stars — "Budou"

=== Excellence Album Award ===
- Sekai no Owari — Tree
- Taeko Onuki and Ryōta Komatsu — Tint
- Kenshi Yonezu — Bremen
- Tube — Your TUBE+My TUBE

=== Good Planning Award ===
- Hideaki Tokunaga — "VOCALIST 1-6"
- ACOON HIBINO — "Kokoro to Karada o Totonoeru: Ai no Shūhasū 528Hz", "Jiritsu Shinkei o Totonoeru Oto no Shohousen: Ai no Shūhasū 528Hz"
- Takamiy, Takeshi Tsuruno, Daigo, Mamoru Miyano, The Alfee, Voyager — "Takamizawa Toshihiko Produce Ultra Hero Song Retsuden"
- Takako Tokiwa, Yaeko Mizutani, Yōko Minamino, Yoshie Taira, Ruriko Asaoka, Kaori Momoi, Pinko Izumi, Yoshiko Sakuma, Reiko Takashima, Mitsuko Kusabue, Shinobu Otake, Tetsuko Kuroyanagi — "Rei Nakanishi to 12-nin no Joyū Tachi"
- Chitose Hajime — "Shōwa Gannen"
- "Takashi Matsumoto Sakushi Katsudō 45-Shūnen Tribute Kazemachi de Aimashou"
- Wagakki Band — Yasou Emaki
- Juju — "Request", "Request II"
- Saya Asakura — "River Boat Song: Future Trax"

=== Achievement Award ===
- Hiroyuki Itsuki
- Shunsuke Kikuchi
- Asei Kobayashi
- Akira Fuse
- Kenichi Mikawa

=== Special Achievement Award ===
- Isao Etō
- Kunihiko Kase
- Yasunori Sugahara
- Michiyasu Tadano
- Tetsuya Chiaki
- Daisuke Mishima

=== Encouragement Award by Japan Composer's Association ===
- Sayuri Ishikawa
- Keisuke Yamauchi

=== Special Award ===
- "Attakain Dakarā♪" (Kumamushi's song)
- Masaharu Fukuyama

=== Best Composer Award ===
- Tsunku — "Umarete Kite Kurete Arigatou" (sung by Kumiko)

=== Best Songwriter Award ===
- Makoto Kitajō — "Spotlight" (Keisuke Yamauchi's song), "Yokohama no Odoriko" (Daisuke Kitagawa's song)

=== Best Arranger Award ===
- Seiji Kameda — "Anata" (Ikimono-gakari's song), "Hitomi" (Sakurako Ohara's song)
