= Daishinnenkai 2021 Nippon Budokan: Amanoiwato =

Video by Wagakki Band
- Released: June 9, 2021
- Recorded: January 3–4, 2021
- Venue: Nippon Budokan
- Genres: J-pop; heavy metal; folk rock
- Language: Japanese
- Label: Universal Sigma

Wagakki Band chronology
Manatsu no Daishinnenkai 2020 Yokohama Arena: Tenkyū no Kakehashi (2020)	Daishinnenkai 2021 Nippon Budokan: Amanoiwato (2021)	Daishinnenkai 2022 Nippon Budokan: Yasoukenbunroku (2022)

Music video
- Daishinnenkai 2021 Nippon Budokan: Amanoiwato all songs digest on YouTube

Daishinnenkai 2021 Nippon Budokan: Amanoiwato (大新年会2021 日本武道館 ～アマノイワト～, New Year's Party 2021 Nippon Budokan ~Heavenly Rock Cave~) is the eighth live video album by Japanese band Wagakki Band, released on June 9, 2021 by Universal Sigma in two editions: Blu-ray + DVD and a limited edition release with 60-page photo book. The video covers the band's two-day concert at the Nippon Budokan on January 3–4, 2021.

The video peaked at No. 2 on Oricon's Blu-ray chart.

== Track listing ==
All tracks are arranged by Wagakki Band.

Blu-ray/DVD
No.	Title	Writer(s)	Length
1.	"Overture ~Amanoiwato~" ((Overture～アマノイワト～; "Overture ~Heavenly Rock Cave~"))
2.	"Senbonzakura" ((千本桜; "A Thousand Sakura"))	Kurousa-P
3.	"Reload Dead"	Asa
4.	"Hangeki no Yaiba" ((反撃の刃; "Counter Blade"))	Machiya
5.	"Hanabi" ((華火; "Fireworks"))	Yuko Suzuhana
6.	"Okinotayuu" ((オキノタユウ; "Albatross"))	Machiya
7.	"Kishikaisei" ((起死回生; "Death and Rebirth"))	Kurona
8.	"Nichirin" ((日輪; "Sun Wheel"))	Machiya
9.	"Seimei no Aria" ((生命のアリア; "Aria of Life"))	Machiya
10.	"Gekka Bijin" ((月下美人; "Queen of the Night"))	Suzuhana
11.	"Episode.0"	mathru
12.	"Wagakki & EDM Session -Haru no Umi Remix-" ((Wagakki & EDM Session -春の海 Remix-; "Wagakki & EDM Session -Spring Sea Remix-"))
13.	"Special Medley 2021" (Supesharu Medorē 2021 (スペシャルメドレー2021))	see below
14.	"Drum Wadaiko Battle ~ Tōhan Mōda ~" ((ドラム和太鼓バトル〜登攀猛打〜; "Drum Wadaiko Battle ~ Climbing Smash ~"))	Wasabi; Kurona
15.	"Appare ga Seigi." ((あっぱれが正義。; "Appreciation Is Justice."))	Suzuhana
16.	"Sasameyuki" ((細雪; "Light Snowfall"))	Machiya
17.	"Izana"	Yuko Suzuhana
18.	"EN1. Akatsuki no Ito" ((EN1. 暁ノ糸; "The Thread of Dawn"))	Machiya
19.	"EN2. Singin' for..."	Wasabi

Special Medley 2021
No.	Title	Writer(s)	Length
1.	"Children Record" (Chirudoren Rekōdo (チルドレンレコード))	Jin
2.	"Perfect Blue"	Asa
3.	"World Domination"	Suzuhana
4.	"Hana Ichimonme" ((花一匁))	Kiyoshi Ibukuro; Suzuhana
5.	"Ignite"	Machiya
6.	"Tsuki Kage Mai Ka" ((月・影・舞・華; "Moon Shadow Dance Flower"))	Gingahōmen P
7.	"Niji-iro Chōchō" ((虹色蝶々; "Rainbow-colored Butterfly"))	Kurousa-P
8.	"Hoshizukiyo" ((星月夜; "Starry Night"))	Machiya

== Personnel ==
- Yuko Suzuhana – vocals
- Machiya – guitar, vocals ("Episode.0")
- Beni Ninagawa – tsugaru shamisen
- Kiyoshi Ibukuro – koto
- Asa – bass
- Daisuke Kaminaga – shakuhachi
- Wasabi – drums
- Kurona – wadaiko

== Charts ==
Chart (2021)	Peak position
Japanese Blu-ray Sales (Oricon)	2
