= Daishinnenkai 2022 Nippon Budokan: Yasōkenbunroku =

Daishinnenkai 2022 Nippon Budokan: Yasoukenbunroku

Video by Wagakki Band
- Released: April 23, 2022
- Recorded: January 9, 2022
- Venue: Nippon Budokan
- Genre: J-pop; heavy metal; folk rock
- Language: Japanese
- Label: Universal Sigma

Wagakki Band chronology
Daishinnenkai 2021 Nippon Budokan: Amanoiwato (2021)	Daishinnenkai 2022 Nippon Budokan: Yasoukenbunroku (2022)	Wagakki Band Daishinnenkai 2024 Nippon Budokan: Yae no Tsubasa (2024)

Music video
- Daishinnenkai 2022 Nippon Budokan: Yasoukenbunroku all songs digest on YouTube

Daishinnenkai 2022 Nippon Budokan: Yasoukenbunroku (大新年会2022 日本武道館 ～八奏見聞録～; New Year's Party 2021 Nippon Budokan ~Yasouken Memoirs~) is the ninth live video album by Japanese band Wagakki Band, released on April 23, 2022 by Universal Sigma in two editions: Blu-ray + CD and Blu-ray + DVD. The video covers the band's annual New Year concert at the Nippon Budokan on January 9, 2022. The concert aired on Wowow Plus on February 27, 2022.

The video peaked at No. 10 on Oricon's Blu-ray chart.

== Track listing ==
All tracks are arranged by Wagakki Band.

Blu-ray/DVD
No.	Title	Writer(s)	Length
1.	"Overture ~Yasoukenbunroku~" ((Overture～八奏見聞録～; "Overture ~Yasouken Memoirs~"))
2.	"Ikusa" ((戦-ikusa-; "War"))	Asa
3.	"Shiromadara" ((白斑; "White Rash"))	Machiya
4.	"Joukei Effector" (Jōkei Efekutā (情景エフェクター; "Effector of Life"))	Asa
5.	"Kishikaisei" ((起死回生; "Death and Rebirth"))	Kurona
6.	"Okinotayuu" ((オキノタユウ; "Albatross"))	Machiya
7.	"Synchronicity" (Shinkuronishiti (シンクロニシティ))	Yuko Suzuhana
8.	"Starlight"	Machiya
9.	"Sasameyuki" ((細雪; "Light Snowfall"))	Machiya
10.	"Eclipse"	Machiya
11.	"Nine Gates"	Daisuke Kaminaga; Kiyoshi Ibukuro; Kurona
12.	"King's Tile Draw" (Rinshan Kaihō (嶺上開花))	Wasabi
13.	"Last Discard" (Hotei Rōgyo (河底撈魚))	Beni Ninagawa; Machiya
14.	"Yoshiwara Lament" (Yoshiwara Ramento (吉原ラメント))	Asa
15.	"Drums & Wadaiko Battle ~Gachiuchi~" ((ドラム和太鼓バトル 月打〜GACHIUCHI〜; "Drums & Wadaiko Battle ~Monthly Strike~"))	Wasabi; Kurona
16.	"Meisaku Journey" (Meisaku Jānī (名作ジャーニー; "Masterpiece Journey"))	Suzuhana
17.	"Setsuna Trip" (Setsuna Torippu (セツナトリップ))	Last Note.
18.	"Senbonzakura" ((千本桜; "A Thousand Sakura"))	Kurousa-P
19.	"Encore 1: Rokuchōnen to Ichiya Monogatari" ((EN1.六兆年と一夜物語; "A Tale of Six Trillion Years and One Night"))	Kemu
20.	"Encore 2: Akatsuki no Ito" ((EN2.暁ノ糸; "The Thread of Dawn"))	Machiya

CD 1
No.	Title	Writer(s)	Length
1.	"Overture ~Yasoukenbunroku~"
2.	"Ikusa"	Asa
3.	"Shiromadara"	Machiya
4.	"Joukei Effector"	Asa
5.	"Kishikaisei"	Kurona
6.	"Okinotayuu"	Machiya
7.	"Synchronicity"	Suzuhana
8.	"Starlight"	Machiya
9.	"Sasameyuki"	Machiya
10.	"Eclipse"	Machiya

CD 2
No.	Title	Writer(s)	Length
1.	"Nine Gates"	Kaminaga; Ibukuro; Wasabi
2.	"King's Tile Draw"	Wasabi
3.	"Last Discard"	Ninagawa; Machiya
4.	"Yoshiwara Lament"	Asa
5.	"Drums & Wadaiko Battle ~Gachiuchi~"	Wasabi; Kurona
6.	"Meisaku Journey"	Suzuhana
7.	"Setsuna Trip"	Last Note.
8.	"Senbonzakura"	Kurousa-P
9.	"Rokuchōnen to Ichiya Monogatari"	Kemu
10.	"Akatsuki no Ito"	Machiya

== Personnel ==
- Yuko Suzuhana – vocals
- Machiya – guitar
- Beni Ninagawa – tsugaru shamisen
- Kiyoshi Ibukuro – koto
- Asa – bass
- Daisuke Kaminaga – shakuhachi
- Wasabi – drums
- Kurona – wadaiko

== Charts ==
Chart (2022)	Peak position
Japanese Blu-ray Sales (Oricon)	10
