= Shikisai (album) =

Studio album by Wagakki Band
- Released: March 22, 2017
- Recorded: 2015–2016
- Studio: Studio Sound Dali; Mit Studio; Studio Sunshine
- Genre: J-pop; heavy metal; folk rock
- Length: 71:50
- Language: Japanese
- Label: Avex Trax
- Producer: Seiji Fukagawa

Wagakki Band chronology
Wagakki Band 1st US Tour Shōgeki: Deep Impact (2017)	Shikisai (2017)	Kiseki Best Collection + (2017)

Singles from Shikisai
- 1. "Strong Fate" Released: January 13, 2016; 2. "Valkyrie (Anime TV Size)" Released: April 6, 2016; 3. "Kishikaisei" Released: August 17, 2016; 4. "Okinotayuu" Released: January 18, 2017

Music video
- Shikisai all songs digest on YouTube

Shikisai (四季彩-shikisai-; Colors of the Four Seasons) is the third studio album by Japanese band Wagakki Band. It was released on March 22, 2017, by Avex Trax in five editions: CD only, two music video editions, and two live concert editions with DVD or Blu-ray discs. The live concert editions feature the band's concert at the Nikkō Tōshō-gū 400th anniversary event. In addition, a mu-mo Shop exclusive box set was released, featuring an instrumental CD, both music video and concert DVDs, and one Blu-ray containing both music video and concert sets.

The album features the song "Kishikaisei", which was used by TV Tokyo for their broadcast of the 2016 Summer Olympics in Rio de Janeiro, as well as "Valkyrie" and "Hotarubi", which were used in the anime series Twin Star Exorcists.

Shikisai peaked at No. 2 on Oricon's albums chart.

== Track listing ==
All tracks are arranged by Wagakki Band.

CD
No.	Title	Writer(s)	Length
1.	"Kishikaisei" ((起死回生; "Death and Rebirth"))	Kurona	4:11
2.	"Howling"	Machiya	4:19
3.	"Strong Fate"	Yuko Suzuhana	3:55
4.	"Mi-ra-i" ((ミ・ラ・イ; "F-u-t-u-r-e"))	Suzuhana	4:30
5.	"Yuki yo Maichire Sonata ni Mukete" ((雪よ舞い散れ其方に向けて; "Snow Dancing and Falling Towards You"))	Asa	4:15
6.	"Hotarubi" ((蛍火; "Fireflies"))	Machiya	4:30
7.	"Watashi Shijō Shugi" ((ワタシ・至上主義; "My Supremacism"))	Beni Ninagawa	3:58
8.	"Bōgetsu" ((望月; "Full Moon"))	Wasabi	3:30
9.	"Okinotayuu" ((オキノタユウ; "Albatross"))	Machiya	4:23
10.	"Valkyrie" ((Valkyrie‐戦乙女‐))	Asa	4:22
11.	"Moon Shine"	Kurona; Kiyoshi Ibukuro	4:48
12.	"Ukiyo Heavy Life" ((浮世heavy life; "Ukiyo Heavy Life"))	Asa	4:41
13.	"Tori no Yō ni" ((鳥のように; "Like a Bird"))	Suzuhana	4:00
14.	"Sora no Kiwami e" ((空の極みへ; "To the Limit of the Sky"))	Ibukuro; Cue-Q	3:39
15.	"Clean"	Asa	5:33
16.	"Ryūsei" ((流星; "Meteor"))	Machiya	4:10
17.	"Children Record (Bonus Track)" (Chirudoren Rekōdo (チルドレンレコード))	Jin	3:06
Total length:			71:50

Music Video Edition DVD/Blu-ray
No.	Title	Length
1.	"Okinotayuu" (Music video)
2.	"Yuki yo Maichire Sonata ni Mukete" (Music video)
3.	"Valkyrie" (Music video)
4.	"Strong Fate" (Music video)
5.	"Kishikaisei" (Music video)
6.	"Okinotayuu" (Making)
7.	"Yuki yo Maichire Sonata ni Mukete" (Making)

Live Video Edition DVD/Blu-ray
No.	Title	Writer(s)	Length
1.	"Overture -Ama no Taiju-" ((Overture -天ノ大樹-))
2.	"Nadeshikozakura" ((なでしこ桜))	Suzuhana
3.	"Valkyrie"	Asa
4.	"Ikusa"	Asa
5.	"Shigin -Kodokan ni Baika wo Shōsu-" ((詩吟 -弘道館に梅花を賞す-))	Suzuhana
6.	"Kishikaisei"	Kurona
7.	"Tōno Monogatari Shi-shi" ((遠野物語四四; "Tono Story 44"))	Ninagawa
8.	"Tsuioku" ((追憶; "Recollection"))	Machiya
9.	"Niji-iro Chōchō" ((虹色蝶々; "Rainbow-colored Butterfly"))	Kurousa-P
10.	"Hoshizukiyo" ((星月夜; "Starry Night"))	Machiya
11.	"Akatsuki no Ito" ((暁ノ糸; "The Thread of Dawn"))	Machiya
12.	"Mi-ra-i"	Suzuhana
13.	"Senbonzakura" ((千本桜; "A Thousand Sakura"))	Kurousa-P

== Personnel ==
- Yuko Suzuhana – vocals
- Machiya – guitar, backing vocals
- Beni Ninagawa – tsugaru shamisen
- Kiyoshi Ibukuro – koto
- Asa – bass
- Daisuke Kaminaga – shakuhachi
- Wasabi – drums
- Kurona – wadaiko, kakegoe vocals (tracks 1, 2, 10, 11, 12)

== Charts ==
Chart (2017)	Peak position
Japanese Albums (Oricon)	2
Japanese Hot Albums (Billboard)	2
Japanese Top Albums Sales (Billboard)	2
