= Yasō Emaki =

Studio album by Wagakki Band
- Released: September 2, 2015
- Recorded: 2015
- Studio: Avex Studio Azabu; Maruni Studio; Prime Sound Studio Form; Studio Sunshine; Sound City Studios, Los Angeles, California, U.S.
- Genre: J-pop; heavy metal; folk rock
- Length: 66:05
- Language: Japanese
- Label: Avex Trax
- Producer: Seiji Fukagawa; Matt Wallace

Wagakki Band chronology
Vocalo Zanmai (2014)	Yasō Emaki (2015)	Wagakki Band 1st US Tour Shōgeki: Deep Impact (2017)

Singles from Yasō Emaki
- 1. "Hanabi" Released: August 27, 2014; 2. "Ikusa/Nadeshikozakura" Released: February 25, 2015; 3. "Hanafurumai" Released: May 25, 2015; 4. "Hangeki no Yaiba" Released: August 17, 2015

Music video
- Yasō Emaki all songs digest on YouTube

Yasō Emaki (八奏絵巻; Octet Picture Scroll) is the second studio album by Japanese band Wagakki Band and the band's first album of original songs. It was released on September 2, 2015, by Avex Trax in five editions: CD only, two music video editions, and two live concert editions with DVD or Blu-ray discs. The live concert editions feature the band's concerts at the Shibuya Public Hall on January 7, 2015, and the ATT Show Box in Taipei on May 10, 2015. In addition, a limited edition "Gōka Kenran Box" (豪華絢爛BOX; "Gorgeous Box") was released, featuring a digital copy of the album and both video editions on a special USB flash drive.

The album features the single "Hangeki no Yaiba", which was produced and mixed by Matt Wallace and featured in the web series Attack on Titan: Counter Rockets. Also included are "Ikusa" and "Nadeshikozakura", which were used as the theme songs of the anime series Samurai Warriors.

Yasō Emaki hit No. 1 on Oricon's albums chart and was certified Gold by the RIAJ. It also earned the band the Good Planning Award at the 57th Japan Record Awards.

== Track listing ==
All tracks are arranged by Wagakki Band.

CD
No.	Title	Writer(s)	Length
1.	"Ikusa" ((戦-ikusa-; "War"))	Asa	3:40
2.	"Hoshizukiyo" ((星月夜; "Starry Night"))	Machiya	4:19
3.	"Perfect Blue"	Asa	4:53
4.	"Tsuioku" ((追憶; "Recollection"))	Machiya	5:16
5.	"Hagane" ((鋼-HAGANE-; "Steel"))	Kurona	4:23
6.	"Fūrin no Utautai" ((風鈴の唄うたい; "Sing with the Wind Chimes"))	Yuko Suzuhana	4:44
7.	"Hanabi" ((華火; "Fireworks"))	Suzuhana	4:02
8.	"Kyōshū no Sora" ((郷愁の空; "Nostalgic Sky"))	Machiya	4:57
9.	"Akatsuki no Ito" ((暁ノ糸; "The Thread of Dawn"))	Machiya	3:28
10.	"Shiro Madara" ((白斑; "White Rash"))	Machiya	4:02
11.	"Nadeshikozakura" ((なでしこ桜))	Suzuhana	4:45
12.	"Hangeki no Yaiba" ((反撃の刃; "Counter Blade"))	Machiya	3:38
13.	"Senbonzakura" ((千本桜; "A Thousand Sakura"))	Kurousa-P	4:30
14.	"Hanafurumai" ((華振舞; "Flower Dance"))	Kiyoshi Ibukuro; Cue-Q	5:12
15.	"Chikyū Saigo no Kokuhaku wo (Bonus Track)" ((地球最後の告白を; "The Earth's Final Confession"))	Kemu	4:38
Total length:			66:05

Music Video Edition DVD/Blu-ray
No.	Title	Length
1.	"Senbonzakura" (Music video)
2.	"Hanabi" (Music video)
3.	"Ikusa" (Music video)
4.	"Nadeshikozakura" (Music video)
5.	"Hangeki no Yaiba" (Music video)
6.	"Akatsuki no Ito" (Music video)
7.	"Hangeki no Yaiba" (Making)
8.	"Akatsuki no Ito" (Making)

Live Video Edition DVD/Blu-ray
No.	Title	Writer(s)	Length
1.	"Rokuchōnen to Ichiya Monogatari" ((六兆年と一夜物語; "A Tale of Six Trillion Years and One Night"))	Kemu
2.	"Hanabi"	Suzuhana
3.	"Hoshizukiyo"	Machiya
4.	"Ikusa"	Asa
5.	"Nadeshikozakura"	Suzuhana
6.	"Koto Solo" ((箏Solo))	Ibukuro
7.	"Kyōshū no Sora"	Machiya
8.	"Niji-iro Chōchō" ((虹色蝶々; "Rainbow-colored Butterfly"))	Kurousa-P
9.	"Nōshō Sakuretsu Girl" ((脳漿炸裂ガール; "Spinal Fluid Explosion Girl"))	Rerulili
10.	"Setsuna Trip" (Setsuna Torippu (セツナトリップ; "Momentary Trip"))	Last Note.
11.	"Tengaku" ((天樂; "Music of the Heavens"))	Yuuyu-P
12.	"Senbonzakura"	Kurousa-P
13.	"Children Record" (Chirudoren Rekōdo (チルドレンレコード))	Jin

== Personnel ==
- Yuko Suzuhana – vocals
- Machiya – guitar, vocals (tracks 3, 8), backing vocals
- Beni Ninagawa – tsugaru shamisen
- Kiyoshi Ibukuro – koto
- Asa – bass
- Daisuke Kaminaga – shakuhachi
- Wasabi – drums
- Kurona – wadaiko, kakegoe vocals (tracks 1, 2, 5)

== Charts ==
Chart (2015)	Peak position
Japanese Albums (Oricon)	1
Japanese Hot Albums (Billboard)	1
Japanese Top Albums Sales (Billboard)	1
J-Pop Albums (Taiwan)	1

== Certification ==
Region	Certification	Certified units/sales
Japan (RIAJ)	Gold	100,000^{^}
^{^} Shipments figures based on certification alone.
