= Wagakki Band Daishinnenkai 2018 Yokohama Arena: Ashita e no Kōkai =

Video by Wagakki Band
- Released: August 8, 2018
- Recorded: January 27, 2018
- Venue: Yokohama Arena
- Genre: J-pop; heavy metal; folk rock
- Language: Japanese
- Label: Avex Trax

Wagakki Band chronology
Wagakki Band Daishinnenkai 2017 Tokyo Taiikukan: Yuki no Utage/Sakura no Utage (2018)	Wagakki Band Daishinnenkai 2018 Yokohama Arena: Ashita e no Kōkai (2018)	Wagakki Band Daishinnenkai 2019 Saitama Super Arena 2 Days: Ryūgū no Tobira (2019)

Music video
- Wagakki Band Daishinnenkai 2018 Yokohama Arena: Ashita e no Kōkai all songs digest on YouTube

Wagakki Band Daishinnenkai 2018 Yokohama Arena: Ashita e no Kōkai (和楽器バンド 大新年会2018横浜アリーナ ~明日への航海~, Wagakki Band New Year's Party 2018 Yokohama Arena: Voyage to Tomorrow) is the fifth live video album by Japanese band Wagakki Band, released on August 8, 2018 by Avex Trax in four editions: DVD, Blu-ray, and two Live CD editions. In addition, a mu-mo Shop exclusive release includes all editions and a poster. The video covers the band's concert at the Yokohama Arena on January 27, 2018.

The video peaked at No. 2 on Oricon's DVD chart and No. 13 on Oricon's Blu-ray chart.

== Track listing ==
All tracks are arranged by Wagakki Band.

DVD/Blu-ray
No.	Title	Writer(s)	Length
1.	"Overture ~Ashita e no Kōkai~" ((Overture～明日への航海～, "Overture ~Voyage to Tomorrow~"))
2.	"Amenochi Kanjouron" ((雨のち感情論, "Emotion Theory After the Rain"))	Yuko Suzuhana
3.	"Kishikaisei" ((起死回生, "Death and Rebirth"))	Kurona
4.	"Hoshizukiyo" ((星月夜, "Starry Night"))	Machiya
5.	"Tengaku" ((天樂, "Music of the Heavens"))	Yuuyu-P
6.	"Niji-iro Chōchō" ((虹色蝶々, "Rainbow-colored Butterfly"))	Kurousa-P
7.	"Yoshiwara Lament" (Yoshiwara Ramento (吉原ラメント))	Asa
8.	"Hangeki no Yaiba" ((反撃の刃, "Counter Blade"))	Machiya
9.	"Yuki Kageboushi" ((雪影ぼうし, "Snow Silhouette"))	Suzuhana
10.	"Dong Feng Po (feat. Yo Hitoto)" (Don Fen Po (東風破))	Vincent Fang
11.	"Kyōshū no Sora" ((郷愁の空, "Nostalgic Sky"))	Machiya
12.	"Synchronicity" (Shinkuronishiti (シンクロニシティ))	Suzuhana
13.	"Hana Ichimonme" ((花一匁))	Kiyoshi Ibukuro; Suzuhana
14.	"Okinotayuu" ((オキノタユウ, "Albatross"))	Machiya
15.	"Kaisen Randa" ((海戦乱打, "Naval Battle Random Hit"))	Kurona
16.	"Ikusa" ((戦 -ikusa-, "War"))	Asa
17.	"Hakushu Kassai" ((拍手喝采, "Applause"))	Kurona
18.	"Ritsudō Yūgi/En" ((律動遊戯・炎, "Rhythm Play/Flame"))
19.	"Hanafurumai" ((華振舞, "Flower Dance"))	Ibukuro; Cue-Q
20.	"Ryūsei" ((流星, "Falling Stars"))	Machiya
21.	"Senbonzakura" ((千本桜, "A Thousand Sakura"))	Kurousa-P
22.	"Rokuchōnen to Ichiya Monogatari" ((六兆年と一夜物語, "A Tale of Six Trillion Years and One Night"))	Kemu
23.	"Akatsuki no Ito" ((暁ノ糸, "The Thread of Dawn"))	Machiya
24.	"Hana ni Nare!" ((花になれ！, "Become a Flower!"))	Suzuhana

== Personnel ==
- Yuko Suzuhana – vocals
- Machiya – guitar, vocals ("Kyōshū no Sora")
- Beni Ninagawa – tsugaru shamisen
- Kiyoshi Ibukuro – koto
- Asa – bass
- Daisuke Kaminaga – shakuhachi
- Wasabi – drums
- Kurona – wadaiko

with

- Yo Hitoto – ("Dong Feng Po")

== Charts ==
Chart (2018)	Peak position
Japanese DVD Sales (Oricon)	2
Blu-ray Sales (Oricon)	13
