= Otonoe =

Studio album by Wagakki Band
- Released: April 25, 2018
- Recorded: 2017
- Studio: Aobadai Studio; Alive Recording Studio; Studio A-Tone Yotsuya; Izumi Hall
- Genre: J-pop; heavy metal; folk rock
- Length: 54:17
- Language: Japanese
- Label: Avex Trax
- Producer: Seiji Fukagawa

Wagakki Band chronology
Kiseki Best Collection + (2017)	Otonoe (2018)	React (2019)

Singles from Otonoe
- 1. "Yuki Kageboushi" Released: January 24, 2018; 2. "Sasameyuki" Released: November 14, 2018

Music video
- Otonoe all songs digest on YouTube

Otonoe (オトノエ) is the fourth studio album by Japanese band Wagakki Band and their final studio release under Avex Trax. It was released on April 25, 2018 in five editions: CD only, two music video editions, and two live concert editions with DVD or Blu-ray discs. The live concert editions feature the Wagakki Band Premium Symphonic Night ~ Live & Orchestra ~ in Osaka-jō Hall show. In addition, a mu-mo Shop exclusive box set was released, featuring an instrumental CD, both music video and concert DVDs and Blu-ray discs.

The album includes the song "Yukikage-Boushi", which was used by used car dealership chain Gulliver for their 2018 New Year sale commercial featuring the band. "Sasameyuki" was used as the ending theme of the anime TV series Holmes of Kyoto.

Otonoe peaked at No. 2 on Oricon's albums chart. The album received the Excellent Album Award at the 60th Japan Record Awards.

== Track listing ==
All tracks are arranged by Wagakki Band.

CD
No.	Title	Writer(s)	Length
1.	"Sasameyuki" ((細雪, "Light Snowfall"))	Machiya	3:58
2.	"Hakanaku mo Utsukushii no wa" ((「儚くも美しいのは」, "What Is Ephemeral and Beautiful"))	Machiya	3:49
3.	"Yuki Kageboushi" ((雪影ぼうし, "Snowy Silhouette"))	Yuko Suzuhana	3:38
4.	"Kimi ga Inai Machi" ((君がいない街, "A City Without You"))	Asa	4:17
5.	"World Domination"	Suzuhana	3:24
6.	"Doppo" ((独歩, "Lonely stroll"))	Machiya	4:01
7.	"Shizumanai Taiyō" ((沈まない太陽, "The Sun That Never Sets"))	Kurona	4:31
8.	"Paradigm Shift" (Paradaimu Shifuto (パラダイムシフト))	Kiyoshi Ibukuro	4:00
9.	"Kaze Tachinu" ((風立ちぬ, "The Wind Rises"))	Machiya	4:08
10.	"Guren" ((紅蓮, "Crimson Lotus"))	Wasabi	3:45
11.	"Sabaku no Komoriuta" ((砂漠の子守唄, "Desert Lullaby"))	Suzuhana	5:52
12.	"Tenjō no Kanata" ((天上ノ彼方, "Beyond the Heavens"))	Asa	4:21
13.	"Okinotayuu -Live Version- (Bonus Track)" ((オキノタユウ-Live ver.-, "Albatross -Live ver.-"))	Machiya	4:34
Total length:			54:17

Music Video Edition DVD/Blu-ray
No.	Title	Length
1.	"Yuki Kageboushi" (Music video)
2.	"Sasameyuki" (Music video)
3.	"Sasameyuki (for Piano and Symphonic Orchestra)" (Music video)
4.	"Sabaku no Komoriuta" (Music video)
5.	"Sasameyuki" (Making)
6.	"Sabaku no Komoriuta" (Making)

Live Video Edition DVD/Blu-ray
No.	Title	Writer(s)	Length
1.	"Overture for Piano and Symphonic Orchestra"
2.	"Tori no Yō ni" ((鳥のように, "Like a Bird"))	Suzuhana
3.	"Hangeki no Yaiba" ((反撃の刃, "Counter Blade"))	Machiya
4.	"Amenochi Kanjouron" ((雨のち感情論, "Emotion Theory After the Rain"))	Suzuhana
5.	"Okinotayuu"	Machiya
6.	"Ryūsei" ((流星, "Falling Stars"))	Machiya
7.	"Wagakki Band Premium Symphonic Night ~ Live & Orchestra ~ in Osaka-jō Hall Documentary" ((｢和楽器バンド Premium Symphonic Night ～ライブ＆オーケストラ～ in 大阪城ホール｣ ドキュメント))

== Personnel ==
- Yuko Suzuhana – vocals
- Machiya – guitar, backing vocals
- Beni Ninagawa – tsugaru shamisen
- Kiyoshi Ibukuro – koto
- Asa – bass
- Daisuke Kaminaga – shakuhachi
- Wasabi – drums
- Kurona – wadaiko, kakegoe vocals (track 7)

== Charts ==
Chart (2018)	Peak position
Japanese Albums (Oricon)	2
Japanese Hot Albums (Billboard)	2
Japanese Top Albums Sales (Billboard)	2
