= Vocalo Zanmai Dai Ensōkai =

Video by Wagakki Band
- Released: November 26, 2014
- Recorded: August 27, 2014
- Venue: Akasaka Blitz
- Genres: J-pop; heavy metal; folk rock
- Language: Japanese
- Label: Avex Trax

Wagakki Band chronology
Hanabi (2014)	Vocalo Zanmai Dai Ensōkai (2014)	Ikusa / Nadeshikozakura (2015)

Music video
- Vocalo Zanmai Dai Ensōkai all songs digest on YouTube

Vocalo Zanmai Dai Ensōkai (ボカロ三昧大演奏会, Bokaro Zanmai Daiensōkai; Vocalo Zanmai Grand Concert) is the first live video album by Japanese band Wagakki Band, released on November 26, 2014, by Avex Trax in two editions: two-disc DVD and single-disc Blu-ray. In addition, an Amazon Japan exclusive release includes a two-disc Audio CD version in each edition. The video covers the band's concert at the Akasaka Blitz on August 27, 2014.

The video peaked at No. 8 on Oricon's DVD chart and No. 23 on Oricon's Blu-ray chart.

== Track listing ==
All tracks are arranged by Wagakki Band.

DVD Disc 1
No.	Title	Writer(s)	Length
1.	"Kagaribi -Opening SE-" ((篝火-Opening SE-))
2.	"Rokuchōnen to Ichiya Monogatari" ((六兆年と一夜物語; "A Tale of Six Trillion Years and One Night"))	Kemu
3.	"Senbonzakura" ((千本桜; "A Thousand Sakura"))	Kurousa-P
4.	"Iroha Uta" ((いろは唄; "Iroha Song"))	Ginsaku
5.	"Luka Luka Night Fever" (Ruka Ruka Naito Fībā (ルカルカ★ナイトフィーバー))	samfree
6.	"Kagerou Daze" (Kagerō Deizu (カゲロウデイズ; "Heat-Haze Daze"))	Jin
7.	"Niji-iro Chōchō" ((虹色蝶々; "Rainbow-colored Butterfly"))	Kurousa-P
8.	"Tsuki Kage Mai Ka" ((月・影・舞・華; "Moon Shadow Dance Flower"))	Gingahōmen P
9.	"Hoshi Furu Oka / Hanafugetsu" ((星降る丘 ／ 華風月; "Hill of Falling Stars"))	Yuko Suzuhana; Daisuke Kaminaga; Kiyoshi Ibukuro
10.	"Sanju no Shutei ni Asobu (Shigin)" ((三樹の酒亭に遊ぶ（詩吟）))	Suzuhana; Kaminaga; Ibukuro

DVD Disc 2
No.	Title	Writer(s)	Length
1.	"Tsugarujamisen × Wadaiko Kyōen" ((津軽三味線×和太鼓 競演; "Tsugaru Shamisen x Wadaiko Competition"))	Beni Ninagawa; Kurona
2.	"Nōshō Sakuretsu Girl" (Nō Shō Sakuretsu Gāru (脳漿炸裂ガール; "Spinal Fluid Explosion Girl"))	Rerulili
3.	"Episode.0"	mathru
4.	"Homura" ((焔; "Flame"))	Machiya; Asa; Wasabi
5.	"Aishū Rain Cafeteria" (Aishū Rein Kafeteria (哀愁レインカフェテリア; "Sorrowful Rain Cafeteria"))	Machiya; Asa; Wasabi
6.	"Shinkai Shōjo" ((深海少女; "Deep Sea Girl"))	Yuuyu-P
7.	"Yoshiwara Lament" (Yoshiwara Ramento (吉原ラメント))	Asa
8.	"Chikyū Saigo no Kokuhaku wo" ((地球最後の告白を; "The Earth's Final Confession"))	Kemu
9.	"Drums × Wadaiko Kyōen" ((Drums×和太鼓 競演; "Drums x Wadaiko Competition"))	Wasabi; Kurona
10.	"Member Shōkai" (Menbā Shōkai (メンバー紹介) "Member Introduction")
11.	"Setsuna Trip" (Setsuna Torippu (セツナトリップ))	Last Note.
12.	"Tengaku" ((天樂; "Music of the Heavens"))	Yuuyu-P
13.	"Hanabi" ((華火; "Fireworks"))	Suzuhana
14.	"Senbonzakura" ((千本桜; "A Thousand Sakura"))	Kurousa-P

Amazon exclusive CD Disc 1
No.	Title	Writer(s)	Length
1.	"Kagaribi -Opening SE-"
2.	"Rokuchōnen to Ichiya Monogatari"	Kemu
3.	"Senbonzakura"	Kurousa-P
4.	"Iroha Uta"	Ginsaku
5.	"Luka Luka Night Fever"	samfree
6.	"Kagerou Daze"	Jin
7.	"Niji-iro Chōchō"	Kurousa-P
8.	"Tsuki Kage Mai Ka"	Gingahōmen P
9.	"Hoshi Furu Oka / Hanafugetsu"	Suzuhana; Kaminaga; Ibukuro
10.	"Sanju no Shutei ni Asobu (Shigin)"	Suzuhana; Kaminaga; Ibukuro
11.	"Tsugarujamisen × Wadaiko Kyōen"	Beni Ninagawa; Kurona
12.	"Nōshō Sakuretsu Girl"	Rerulili
13.	"Episode.0"	mathru

Amazon exclusive CD Disc 2
No.	Title	Writer(s)	Length
1.	"Homura"	Machiya; Asa; Wasabi
2.	"Aishū Rain Cafeteria"	Machiya; Asa; Wasabi
3.	"Shinkai Shōjo"	Yuuyu-P
4.	"Yoshiwara Lament"	Asa
5.	"Chikyū Saigo no Kokuhaku wo"	Kemu
6.	"Drums × Wadaiko Kyōen"	Wasabi; Kurona
7.	"Member Shōkai"
8.	"Setsuna Trip"	Last Note.
9.	"Tengaku"	Yuuyu-P
10.	"Hanabi"	Suzuhana
11.	"Senbonzakura"	Kurousa-P

== Personnel ==
- Yuko Suzuhana – vocals
- Machiya – guitar, vocals ("Episode.0")
- Beni Ninagawa – tsugaru shamisen
- Kiyoshi Ibukuro – koto
- Asa – bass
- Daisuke Kaminaga – shakuhachi
- Wasabi – drums
- Kurona – wadaiko

== Charts ==
Chart (2014)	Peak position
Japanese DVD Sales (Oricon)	8
Blu-ray Sales (Oricon)	23
