= Phony (song) =

Japanese Vocaloid song

- Music video cover

Single by Tsumiki

from the album Symmetry
- Language: Japanese
- Released: November 24, 2021
- Genre: Drum and bass; techno
- Length: 3:09
- Label: KAMITSUBAKI STUDIO
- Songwriter: Tsumiki

Music video
- "Phony" on YouTube

"Phony" (フォニイ, Fonī) is a 2021 song written by Japanese music producer Tsumiki (ツミキ), utilizing the CeVIO voicebank KAFU. The song has inspired many cover versions.

== Lyrics and composition ==
"Phony" combines pop, drum and bass, and techno genres. The song features the repeated lyric "phony" and onomatopoeic hooks. Higakiyuuka from KAI-YOU described it as having a catchy melody, a musical structure that is "surprising in a good way", and literary lyrics.

Tsumiki said that compared to previous Vocaloid voicebanks, KAFU can transmit an overwhelmingly large amount of information and show more "flesh-and-blood". These characteristics are reflected in this song, with Tsumiki stating that the production is fresh and exciting, and the vocal style is completely different from traditional songs.

== Music video ==
A music video for "Phony" was released on June 5, 2021. It is a hand-drawn animation with lyrics subtitles. The illustrations were created by Japanese illustrator Uedatsubasa, and the film was edited and produced by Tsumiki.

== Chart performance ==
This song placed at number 13 on the Heatseekers Songs chart released by Billboard Japan on December 15, 2021, and peaked at number 10 on the Heatseekers Songs chart in the fifth week.

In the YouTube Top User Generated Songs chart released by Billboard Japan on January 12, 2022, it entered the top 20 and ranked third, later rose to second place in the 24th week, and eventually surpassed "Kamippoi na" and won first place in the 31st week.

The song ranked second on the Top User Generated Songs chart for the first half of 2022, and won second place on Billboard Japan Niconico Vocaloid Songs Top 20 chart on December 21, 2022.

== Wagakki Band version ==
"Phony"

Song by Wagakki Band

from the album Vocalo Zanmai 2
- Language: Japanese
- Released: July 1, 2022
- Length: 3:10
- Label: Universal Sigma
- Songwriter: Tsumiki

Music video
- "Phony" on YouTube

Wagakki Band covered "Phony" and released their music video on YouTube on 1 June 2022. It gained over 450,000 views on YouTube following release.

=== Charts ===
Phony (フォニイ)
Chart	Peak position
Billboard Japan Download Songs	59
