= Wagakki Band Daishinnenkai 2017 Tokyo Taiikukan: Yuki no Utage/Sakura no Utage =

Video by Wagakki Band
- Released: June 21, 2017
- Recorded: February 17–18, 2017
- Venue: Tokyo Metropolitan Gymnasium
- Genres: J-pop; heavy metal; folk rock
- Language: Japanese
- Label: Avex Trax

Wagakki Band chronology
Wagakki Band 1st US Tour Shōgeki: Deep Impact (2017)	Wagakki Band Daishinnenkai 2017 Tokyo Taiikukan: Yuki no Utage/Sakura no Utage (2017)	Wagakki Band Daishinnenkai 2018 Yokohama Arena: Ashita e no Kōkai (2018)

Music video
- Wagakki Band Daishinnenkai 2017 Tokyo Taiikukan: Yuki no Utage/Sakura no Utage all songs digest on YouTube

Wagakki Band Daishinnenkai 2017 Tokyo Taiikukan: Yuki no Utage/Sakura no Utage (和楽器バンド大新年会2017東京体育館 -雪ノ宴・桜ノ宴-, Wagakki Band New Year's Party 2017 Tokyo Metropolitan Gymnasium: Feast of Snow/Feast of Sakura) is the fourth live video album by Japanese band Wagakki Band, released on June 21, 2017 by Avex Trax in six editions: 2-disc DVD, single-disc Blu-ray, two Documentary editions, and two Live CD editions. In addition, a mu-mo Shop exclusive release includes all editions and a bonus audio CD. The video covers the band's two-day concert at the Tokyo Metropolitan Gymnasium on February 17–18, 2017.

The video peaked at No. 2 on Oricon's DVD chart and No. 11 on Oricon's Blu-ray chart.

== Track listing ==
All tracks are arranged by Wagakki Band. All tracks were recorded from the Sakura no Utage show (February 18), except DVD Disc 2 tracks 4–8, which were recorded from the Yuki no Utage show (February 17).

DVD Disc 1
No.	Title	Writer(s)	Length
1.	"Overture ~Sasameyuki~" ((Overture～細雪～; "Overture ~Light Snowfall~"))	Machiya
2.	"Nadeshikozakura" ((なでしこ桜))	Yuko Suzuhana
3.	"Ikusa" ((戦 -ikusa-; "War"))	Asa
4.	"Hangeki no Yaiba" ((反撃の刃; "Counter Blade"))	Machiya
5.	"Yoshiwara Lament" (Yoshiwara Ramento (吉原ラメント))	Asa
6.	"Mi-ra-i" ((ミ・ラ・イ; "F-u-t-u-r-e"))	Suzuhana
7.	"Shiro Madara" ((白斑; "White Rash"))	Machiya
8.	"Children Record" (Chirudoren Rekōdo (チルドレンレコード))	Jin
9.	"Toki no Kairō" ((-時ノ回廊-; "Time Corridor"))
10.	"Tōno Monogatari Shi-shi" ((遠野物語四四; "Tono Story 44"))	Beni Ninagawa
11.	"Kochō no Yume" ((胡蝶の夢; "The Dream of the Butterfly"))
12.	"Niji-iro Chōchō" ((虹色蝶々; "Rainbow-colored Butterfly"))	Kurousa-P
13.	"Infinity"
14.	"Setsuna -Sakurafū Sekka-" ((刹那-桜風雪花-; "Moment -Sakura Blizzard Flowers-"))
15.	"Homura" ((焔; "Flame"))	Machiya; Asa; Wasabi
16.	"Valkyrie" ((Valkyrie‐戦乙女‐))	Asa
17.	"Okinotayuu" ((オキノタユウ; "Albatross"))	Machiya
18.	"Setsuna Trip" (Setsuna Torippu (セツナトリップ))	Last Note.
19.	"Drum & Wadaiko Battle -Yūki Enraku-" ((ドラム・和太鼓バトル-遊嬉宴楽-; "Drum & Wadaiko Battle - Happy Feast-"))	Wasabi; Kurona
20.	"Hoshizukiyo" ((星月夜; "Starry Night"))	Machiya
21.	"Kishikaisei" ((起死回生; "Death and Rebirth"))	Kurona
22.	"Hanafurumai" ((華振舞; "Flower Dance"))	Kiyoshi Ibukuro; Cue-Q
23.	"Senbonzakura" ((千本桜; "A Thousand Sakura"))	Kurousa-P

DVD Disc 2
No.	Title	Writer(s)	Length
1.	"Akatsuki no Ito" ((暁ノ糸; "The Thread of Dawn"))	Machiya
2.	"Ukiyo Heavy Life" ((浮世heavy life; "World Heavy Life"))	Asa
3.	"Perfect Blue"	Asa
4.	"Rokuchōnen to Ichiya Monogatari" ((六兆年と一夜物語; "A Tale of Six Trillion Years and One Night"))	Kemu
5.	"Episode.0"	mathru
6.	"Tengaku" ((天樂; "Music of the Heavens"))	Yuuyu-P
7.	"Setsuna -Shirazakura no Yoru-" ((刹那-白桜ノ夜-; "Moment -Night of the White Cherry Blossoms-"))	Kurona
8.	"Yuki yo Maichire Sonata ni Mukete" ((雪よ舞い散れ其方に向けて; "Snow Dancing and Falling Towards You"))	Asa
9.	"Akatsuki no Ito Member Betsu Angle Saisei: Suzuhana Yūko Ver." ((｢暁ノ糸｣ メンバー別アングル再生 鈴華ゆう子 ver.; "Akatsuki no Ito Member Angle Playback: Yuko Suzuhana Ver."))
10.	"Akatsuki no Ito Member Betsu Angle Saisei: Kaminaga Daisuke Ver." ((｢暁ノ糸｣ メンバー別アングル再生 神永大輔 ver.; "Akatsuki no Ito Member Angle Playback: Daisuke Kaminaga Ver."))
11.	"Akatsuki no Ito Member Betsu Angle Saisei: Ibukuro Kiyoshi Ver." ((｢暁ノ糸｣ メンバー別アングル再生 いぶくろ聖志 ver.; "Akatsuki no Ito Member Angle Playback: Kiyoshi Ibukuro Ver."))
12.	"Akatsuki no Ito Member Betsu Angle Saisei: Ninagawa Beni Ver." ((｢暁ノ糸｣ メンバー別アングル再生 蜷川べに ver.; "Akatsuki no Ito Member Angle Playback: Beni Ninagawa Ver."))
13.	"Akatsuki no Ito Member Betsu Angle Saisei: Kurona Ver." ((｢暁ノ糸｣ メンバー別アングル再生 黒流 ver.; "Akatsuki no Ito Member Angle Playback: Kurona Ver."))
14.	"Akatsuki no Ito Member Betsu Angle Saisei: Machiya" ((｢暁ノ糸｣ メンバー別アングル再生 町屋 ver.; "Akatsuki no Ito Member Angle Playback: Machiya Ver."))
15.	"Akatsuki no Ito Member Betsu Angle Saisei: Asa" ((｢暁ノ糸｣ メンバー別アングル再生 亜沙 ver.; "Akatsuki no Ito Member Angle Playback: Asa Ver."))
16.	"Akatsuki no Ito Member Betsu Angle Saisei: Wasabi" ((｢暁ノ糸｣ メンバー別アングル再生 山葵 ver.; "Akatsuki no Ito Member Angle Playback: Wasabi Ver."))

Documentary Edition DVD Disc 3/Blu-ray Disc 2
No.	Title	Length
1.	"Wagakki Band Daishinnenkai 2017 Tokyo Taiikukan: Yuki no Utage/Sakura no Utage Documentary Film" ((「和楽器バンド大新年会2017東京体育館-雪ノ宴・桜ノ宴-」ドキュメント映像))

Live CD Disc 1
No.	Title	Writer(s)	Length
1.	"Overture ~Sasameyuki~"	Machiya	1:35
2.	"Nadeshikozakura"	Suzuhana	4:43
3.	"Ikusa"	Asa	3:57
4.	"Hangeki no Yaiba"	Machiya	3:47
5.	"Yoshiwara Lament"	Asa	4:39
6.	"Mi-ra-i"	Suzuhana	4:29
7.	"Shiro Madara"	Machiya	3:52
8.	"Children Record"	Jin	3:29
9.	"Tōno Monogatari Shi-shi"	Ninagawa	3:17
10.	"Kochō no Yume"		2:09
11.	"Niji-iro Chōchō"	Kurousa-P	5:37
12.	"Infinity"		1:41
13.	"Setsuna -Sakurafū Sekka-"		3:22
14.	"Homura"	Machiya; Asa; Wasabi	5:23

Live CD Disc 2
No.	Title	Writer(s)	Length
1.	"Valkyrie -Ikusa Otome-"	Asa	4:38
2.	"Oki no Tayuu"	Machiya	4:23
3.	"Setsuna Trip"	Last Note.	4:46
4.	"Drum & Wadaiko Battle -Yūki Enraku-"	Wasabi; Kurona	7:24
5.	"Hoshizukiyo"	Machiya	4:34
6.	"Kishikaisei"	Kurona	4:38
7.	"Hanafurumai"	Kiyoshi Ibukuro; Cue-Q	5:36
8.	"Senbonzakura"	Kurousa-P	4:54
9.	"Akatsuki no Ito"	Machiya	3:24
10.	"Ukiyo Heavy Life"	Asa	4:55
11.	"Perfect Blue"	Asa	5:23

mu-mo Shop exclusive Live CD Disc 3 (Yuki no Utage recording)
No.	Title	Writer(s)	Length
1.	"Hanabi" ((華火; "Fireworks"))	Suzuhana	4:02
2.	"Iroha Uta" ((いろは唄; "Iroha Song"))	Ginsaku	4:38
3.	"Rokuchōnen to Ichiya Monogatari"	Kemu	3:59
4.	"Episode.0"	mathru	5:34
5.	"Tengaku"	Yuuyu-P	5:06
6.	"Setsuna -Shirazakura no Yoru-"	Kurona	3:45
7.	"Nou Shou Sakuretsu Girl" (Nō Shō Sakuretsu Gāru (脳漿炸裂ガール; "Spinal Fluid Explosion Girl"))	Rerulili	3:20
8.	"Yuki yo Maichire Sonata ni Mukete"	Asa	4:39

== Personnel ==
- Yuko Suzuhana – vocals
- Machiya – guitar, vocals ("Episode.0")
- Beni Ninagawa – tsugaru shamisen
- Kiyoshi Ibukuro – koto
- Asa – bass
- Daisuke Kaminaga – shakuhachi
- Wasabi – drums
- Kurona – wadaiko

== Charts ==
Chart (2017)	Peak position
Japanese DVD Sales (Oricon)	2
Blu-ray Sales (Oricon)	11
