= React (Wagakki Band EP) =

EP by Wagakki Band
- Released: June 12, 2019
- Recorded: 2019
- Genre: J-pop; heavy metal; folk rock
- Length: 17:05
- Language: Japanese
- Label: Universal Sigma

Wagakki Band chronology
Otonoe (2018)	React (2019)	Kiseki Best Collection II (2020)

Music video
- React all songs digest on YouTube

React is the first EP by Japanese band Wagakki Band and their first studio release under Universal Sigma. It was released on June 12, 2019 in three editions: CD only, CD with photo book, and CD with DVD. In addition, a Universal Music Store exclusive box set with all versions was released. The band conceptualized the EP as a way to express their belief with a strong will to deliver their music to people all over the world.

The EP peaked at No. 5 on Oricon's albums chart.

== Track listing ==
All tracks are arranged by Wagakki Band.

CD
No.	Title	Writer(s)	Length
1.	"Break Out"	Kurona	4:14
2.	"Ignite"	Machiya	3:34
3.	"Izana"	Yuko Suzuhana	5:11
4.	"Joukei Effector" (Jōkei Efekutā (情景エフェクター, "Effector of Life"))	Asa	4:06
Total length:			17:05

CD Only release bonus tracks
No.	Title	Writer(s)	Length
5.	"Break Out" (Instrumental)	Kurona	4:14
6.	"Ignite" (Instrumental)	Machiya	3:34
7.	"Izana" (Instrumental)	Suzuhana	5:11
8.	"Joukei Effector" (Instrumental)	Asa	4:06
Total length:			17:05

DVD
No.	Title	Length
1.	"Behind the Scenes of React: Recording Documentary"
2.	"Ignite" (Music video)
3.	"Ignite" (Making)

== Personnel ==
- Yuko Suzuhana – vocals
- Machiya – guitar
- Beni Ninagawa – tsugaru shamisen
- Kiyoshi Ibukuro – koto
- Asa – bass
- Daisuke Kaminaga – shakuhachi
- Wasabi – drums
- Kurona – wadaiko

== Charts ==
Chart (2019)	Peak position
Japanese Albums (Oricon)	5
J-Pop Albums (Taiwan)	8
