= Wagakki Band Daishinnenkai 2016 Nippon Budokan: Akatsuki no Utage =

Video by Wagakki Band
- Released: March 23, 2016
- Recorded: January 6, 2016
- Venue: Nippon Budokan
- Genre: J-pop; heavy metal; folk rock
- Language: Japanese
- Label: Avex Trax

Wagakki Band chronology
Ikusa / Nadeshikozakura (2015)	Wagakki Band Daishinnenkai 2016 Nippon Budokan: Akatsuki no Utage (2016)	Kishikaisei (2016)

Music video
- Wagakki Band Daishinnenkai 2016 Nippon Budokan: Akatsuki no Utage all songs digest on YouTube

Wagakki Band Daishinnenkai 2016 Nippon Budokan: Akatsuki no Utage (和楽器バンド 大新年会2016日本武道館-暁ノ宴-, Wagakki Band New Year's Party 2016 Nippon Budokan: Feast of Dawn) is the second live video album by Japanese band Wagakki Band, released on March 23, 2016, by Avex Trax in four editions: two-disc DVD, single-disc Blu-ray, and both editions with two-disc Audio CDs. In addition, an Amazon Japan exclusive release includes a bonus video from the band's 2015 Japan tour. The video covers the band's concert at the Nippon Budokan on January 6, 2016. It also features "Senbonzakura" filmed at different angles featuring each member.

The video peaked at No. 7 on Oricon's DVD chart and No. 11 on Oricon's Blu-ray chart.

== Track listing ==
All tracks are arranged by Wagakki Band.

DVD Disc 1
No.	Title	Writer(s)	Length
1.	"Overture -Akatsuki-"
2.	"Akatsuki no Ito" ((暁ノ糸, "The Thread of Dawn"))	Machiya
3.	"Ikusa" ((戦 -ikusa-, "War"))	Asa
4.	"Hanabi" ((華火, "Fireworks"))	Yuko Suzuhana
5.	"Rokuchōnen to Ichiya Monogatari" ((六兆年と一夜物語, "A Tale of Six Trillion Years and One Night"))	Kemu
6.	"Hagane" ((鋼 -HAGANE-, "Steel"))	Kurona
7.	"Tsuioku" ((追憶, "Recollection"))	Machiya
8.	"Nōshō Sakuretsu Girl" (Nō Shō Sakuretsu Gāru (脳漿炸裂ガール, "Spinal Fluid Explosion Girl"))	Rerulili
9.	"Jongara (Tsugaru-shamisen Solo)" ((JONGARA （津軽三味線ソロ）))	Beni Ninagawa
10.	"Yoshiwara Lament" (Yoshiwara Ramento (吉原ラメント))	Asa
11.	"Zankyō (Koto Solo)" ((残響 （箏ソロ）, "Reverberation (Koto Solo)"))	Kiyoshi Ibukuro
12.	"Fūrin no Utautai" ((風鈴の唄うたい, "Sing with the Wind Chimes"))	Suzuhana
13.	"Kazamai (Wadaiko Kenbu)" ((風舞 -KAZAMAI- (和太鼓・剣舞)))	Kurona
14.	"Homura" ((焔, "Flame"))	Machiya; Asa; Wasabi
15.	"Enrai (Shakuhachi Solo)" ((遠雷 （尺八ソロ）, "A Distant Thunder (Shakuhachi Solo)"))	Daisuke Kaminaga
16.	"Hangeki no Yaiba" ((反撃の刃, "Counter Blade"))	Machiya
17.	"Kyōshū no Sora" ((郷愁の空, "Nostalgic Sky"))	Machiya

DVD Disc 2
No.	Title	Writer(s)	Length
1.	"Shiro Madara" ((白斑, "White Rash"))	Machiya
2.	"Drum & Wadaiko Battle" (Doramu ando Wadaiko Batoru (ドラム＆和太鼓バトル))	Wasabi; Kurona
3.	"Hanafurumai" ((華振舞, "Flower Dance"))	Ibukuro; Cue-Q
4.	"Chikyū Saigo no Kokuhaku wo" ((地球最後の告白を, "The Earth's Final Confession"))	Kemu
5.	"Nadeshikozakura" ((なでしこ桜))	Suzuhana
6.	"Hoshizukiyo" ((星月夜, "Starry Night"))	Machiya
7.	"Perfect Blue"	Asa
8.	"Strong Fate"	Suzuhana
9.	"Tengaku" ((天樂, "Music of the Heavens"))	Yuuyu-P
10.	"Senbonzakura" ((千本桜, "A Thousand Sakura"))	Kurousa-P
11.	"Senbonzakura Member Betsu Angle Saisei: Suzuhana Yūko" ((｢千本桜｣ メンバー別アングル再生 鈴華ゆう子, "Senbonzakura Member Angle Playback: Yuko Suzuhana"))
12.	"Senbonzakura Member Betsu Angle Saisei: Kaminaga Daisuke" ((｢千本桜｣ メンバー別アングル再生 神永大輔, "Senbonzakura Member Angle Playback: Daisuke Kaminaga"))
13.	"Senbonzakura Member Betsu Angle Saisei: Ibukuro Kiyoshi" ((｢千本桜｣ メンバー別アングル再生 いぶくろ聖志, "Senbonzakura Member Angle Playback: Kiyoshi Ibukuro"))
14.	"Senbonzakura Member Betsu Angle Saisei: Ninagawa Beni" ((｢千本桜｣ メンバー別アングル再生 蜷川べに, "Senbonzakura Member Angle Playback: Beni Ninagawa"))
15.	"Senbonzakura Member Betsu Angle Saisei: Kurona" ((｢千本桜｣ メンバー別アングル再生 黒流, "Senbonzakura Member Angle Playback: Kurona"))
16.	"Senbonzakura Member Betsu Angle Saisei: Machiya" ((｢千本桜｣ メンバー別アングル再生 町屋, "Senbonzakura Member Angle Playback: Machiya"))
17.	"Senbonzakura Member Betsu Angle Saisei: Asa" ((｢千本桜｣ メンバー別アングル再生 亜沙, "Senbonzakura Member Angle Playback: Asa"))
18.	"Senbonzakura Member Betsu Angle Saisei: Wasabi" ((｢千本桜｣ メンバー別アングル再生 山葵, "Senbonzakura Member Angle Playback: Wasabi"))

Live CD Edition Disc 1
No.	Title	Writer(s)	Length
1.	"Overture -Akatsuki-"
2.	"Akatsuki no Ito"	Machiya
3.	"Ikusa"	Asa
4.	"Hanabi"	Suzuhana
5.	"Rokuchōnen to Ichiya Monogatari"	Kemu
6.	"Hagane"	Kurona
7.	"Tsuioku"	Machiya
8.	"Nou Shou Sakuretsu Girl"	Rerulili
9.	"Jongara (Tsugaru-shamisen Solo)"	Ninagawa
10.	"Yoshiwara Lament"	Asa
11.	"Zankyō (Koto Solo)"	Kiyoshi Ibukuro
12.	"Fūrin no Utautai"	Suzuhana
13.	"Kazamai (Wadaiko Kenbu)"	Kurona
14.	"Homura"	Machiya; Asa; Wasabi

Live CD Edition Disc 2
No.	Title	Writer(s)	Length
1.	"Enrai (Shakuhachi Solo)"	Kaminaga
2.	"Hangeki no Yaiba"	Machiya
3.	"Kyōshū no Sora"	Machiya
4.	"Shiro Madara"	Machiya
5.	"Drum & Wadaiko Battle"	Wasabi; Kurona
6.	"Hanafurumai"	Ibukuro; Cue-Q
7.	"Chikyū Saigo no Kokuhaku wo"	Kemu
8.	"Nadeshikozakura"	Suzuhana
9.	"Hoshizukiyo"	Machiya
10.	"Perfect Blue"	Asa
11.	"Strong Fate"	Suzuhana
12.	"Tengaku"	Yuuyu-P
13.	"Senbonzakura"	Kurousa-P

Amazon exclusive DVD/Blu-ray
No.	Title	Writer(s)	Length
1.	"Overture -Seichi Junrei-" ((Overture -聖地巡礼-, "Overture -Sacred Pilgrimage-"))
2.	"Ikusa"	Asa
3.	"Iroha Uta" ((いろは唄, "Iroha Song"))	Ginsaku
4.	"Perfect Blue"	Asa
5.	"Rokuchōnen to Ichiya Monogatari"	Kemu
6.	"Hanabi"	Suzuhana
7.	"Niji-iro Chōchō" ((虹色蝶々, "Rainbow-colored Butterfly"))	Kurousa-P
8.	"Nou Shou Sakuretsu Girl"	Rerulili
9.	"Yoshiwara Lament"	Asa
10.	"Shikisoku Zeku" ((色即是空, "All Is Vanity"))	Kurona
11.	"Homura"	Machiya; Asa; Wasabi
12.	"Akatsuki no Ito"	Machiya
13.	"Hangeki no Yaiba"	Machiya
14.	"Hagane"	Kurona
15.	"Kyōshū no Sora"	Machiya
16.	"Drum & Wadaiko Battle"	Wasabi; Kurona
17.	"Hoshizukiyo"	Machiya
18.	"Nadeshikozakura"	Suzuhana
19.	"Tengaku"	Yuuyu-P
20.	"Hanafurumai"	Ibukuro; Cue-Q
21.	"Senbonzakura"	Kurousa-P
22.	"Chikyū Saigo no Kokuhaku wo"	Kemu

== Personnel ==
- Yuko Suzuhana – vocals
- Machiya – guitar, vocals ("Kyōshū no Sora")
- Beni Ninagawa – tsugaru shamisen
- Kiyoshi Ibukuro – koto
- Asa – bass
- Daisuke Kaminaga – shakuhachi
- Wasabi – drums
- Kurona – wadaiko

== Charts ==
Chart (2016)	Peak position
Japanese DVD Sales (Oricon)	7
Blu-ray Sales (Oricon)	11
