= Vocalo Zanmai =

Studio album by Wagakki Band
- Released: April 23, 2014
- Recorded: 2013–2014
- Studio: Maruni Studio; Mit Studio; Studio Sunshine; Sound Arts; Prime Studio Sound Form; Avex Studio; Avex Studio Azabu
- Genre: J-pop; heavy metal; folk rock
- Length: 51:31
- Language: Japanese
- Label: Avex Trax
- Producer: Seiji Fukagawa

Wagakki Band chronology
Vocalo Zanmai (2014)	Yasō Emaki (2015)

Music video
- Vocalo Zanmai all songs digest on YouTube

Vocalo Zanmai (ボカロ三昧, Bokaro Zanmai) is the debut album by Japanese band Wagakki Band, released on April 23, 2014 by Avex Trax in three editions: CD only, CD with DVD, and CD with Blu-ray. The album features Vocaloid (one UTAU) songs covered in the band's style of mixing traditional Japanese musical instruments (wagakki) with heavy metal. Their version of Kurousa-P's "Senbonzakura" has since become the band's signature song on live performances.

The album peaked at No. 5 on Oricon's albums chart and was certified Gold by the RIAJ.

== Track listing ==
All tracks are arranged by Wagakki Band.

CD
No.	Title	Writer(s)	Original voice synthesizer	Length
1.	"Tengaku" ((天樂, "Music of the Heavens"))	Yuuyu-P	Kagamine Rin	5:07
2.	"Setsuna Trip" (Setsuna Torippu (セツナトリップ, "Momentary Trip"))	Last Note.	GUMI	4:06
3.	"Yoshiwara Lament" (Yoshiwara Ramento (吉原ラメント))	Asa	Kasane Teto	3:55
4.	"Kagerou Daze" (Kagerō Deizu (カゲロウデイズ, "Heat-Haze Daze"))	Jin	Hatsune Miku	3:55
5.	"Niji-iro Chōchō" ((虹色蝶々, "Rainbow-colored Butterfly"))	Kurousa-P	Hatsune Miku	5:01
6.	"Iroha Uta" ((いろは唄, "Iroha Song"))	Ginsaku	Kagamine Rin	4:28
7.	"Rokuchōnen to Ichiya Monogatari" ((六兆年と一夜物語, "A Tale of Six Trillion Years and One Night"))	Kemu	IA	3:57
8.	"Tsuki Kage Mai Ka" ((月・影・舞・華, "Moon Shadow Dance Flower"))	Gingahoumen P	Hatsune Miku	4:13
9.	"Episode.0"	mathru	Camui Gakupo	5:23
10.	"Shinkai Shōjo" ((深海少女, "Deep Sea Girl"))	Yuuyu-P	Hatsune Miku	3:36
11.	"Nōshō Sakuretsu Girl" (Nō Shō Sakuretsu Gāru (脳漿炸裂ガール, "Brain Fluid Explosion Girl"))	Rerulili	Hatsune Miku and GUMI	3:14
12.	"Senbonzakura" ((千本桜, "A Thousand Sakura"))	Kurousa-P	Hatsune Miku	4:30
Total length:				51:31

DVD
No.	Title	Length
1.	"Rokuchōnen to Ichiya Monogatari" (Music video)
2.	"Tengaku" (Music video)
3.	"Tengaku" (Making)
4.	"Rokuchōnen to Ichiya Monogatari" (Making)
5.	"Senbonzakura" (Making)

Blu-ray
No.	Title	Length
1.	"Rokuchōnen to Ichiya Monogatari" (Music video)
2.	"Tengaku" (Music video)
3.	"Senbonzakura" (Music video)
4.	"Rokuchōnen to Ichiya Monogatari" (Making)
5.	"Tengaku" (Making)
6.	"Senbonzakura" (Making)

== Personnel ==
- Yuko Suzuhana – vocals
- Machiya – guitar, vocals (tracks 9, 11), backing vocals
- Beni Ninagawa – tsugaru shamisen
- Kiyoshi Ibukuro – koto
- Asa – bass, backing vocals (track 3)
- Daisuke Kaminaga – shakuhachi
- Wasabi – drums
- Kurona – wadaiko, kakegoe vocals (tracks 7, 8)

== Charts ==
Chart (2014)	Peak position
Japanese Albums (Oricon)	5
Japanese Top Albums Sales (Billboard)	5

== Certification ==
Region	Certification	Certified units/sales
Japan (RIAJ)	Gold	100,000^{^}
^{^} Shipments figures based on certification alone.
