= Wagakki Band =

Japanese rock band

Wagakki Band 和楽器バンド
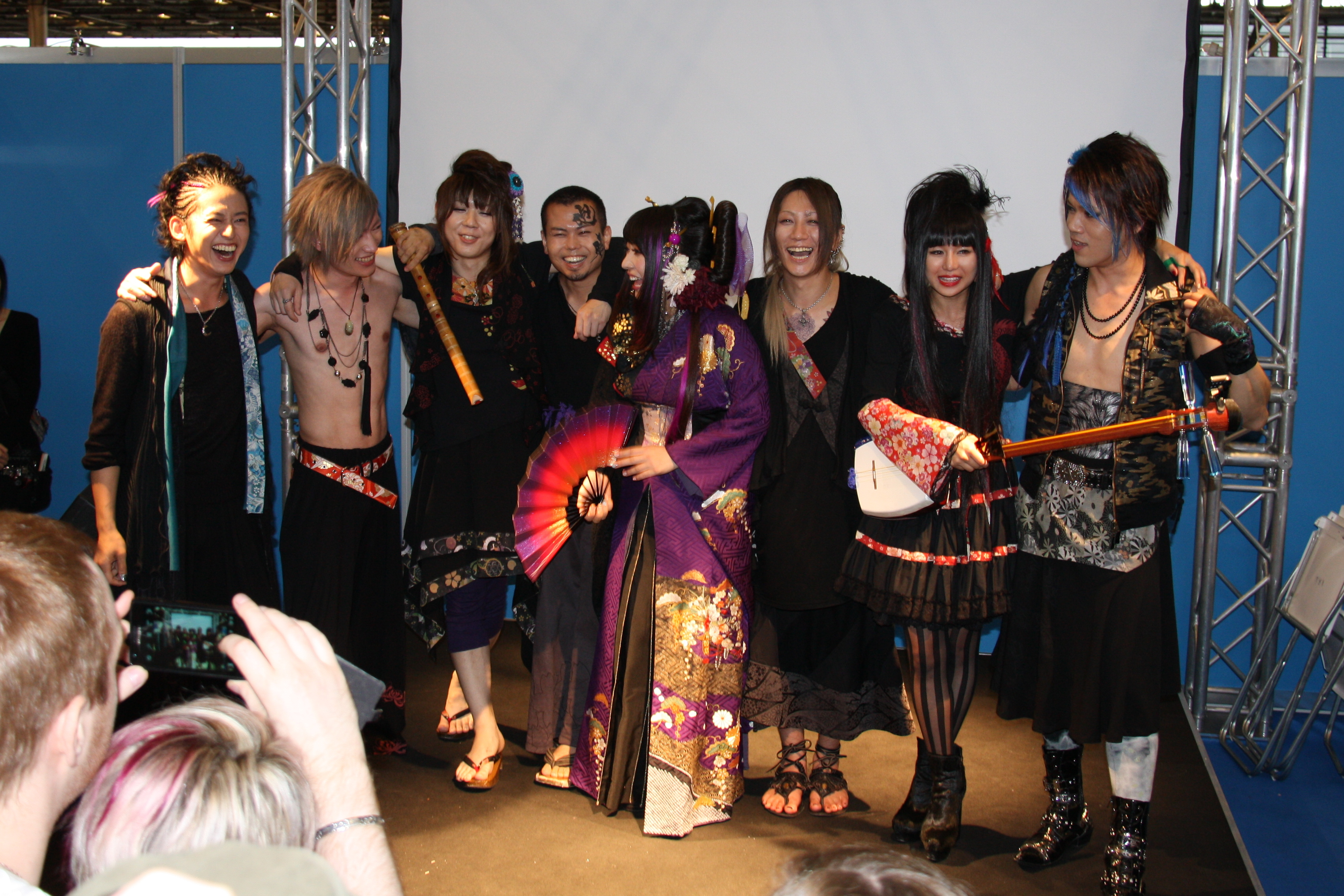
- Wagakki Band during a photo shoot at Japan Expo 2014 in Paris

Background information
- Origin: Japan
- Genres: Folk rock; heavy metal; J-pop
- Years active: 2013–present
- Labels: Avex Trax; Universal Sigma
- Members: Yuko Suzuhana; Kiyoshi Ibukuro; Daisuke Kaminaga; Beni Ninagawa; Kurona; Machiya; Asa; Wasabi
- Website: wagakkiband.com

Wagakki Band (Japanese: 和楽器バンド, Hepburn: Wagakki Bando) is a Japanese band that combines rock and metal music with wagakki instruments and Shigin poetries.

Their early songs were adapted from Vocaloid, with their music videos for the songs "Tengaku" (天樂) and "Senbonzakura" (千本桜) attracting millions of views online before their first album was released. In 2015, their first album of original material, Yasō Emaki, debuted at number one on the Oricon Albums Chart and won a Japan Record Award. Their fourth album, Otonoe (2018), also won a Japan Record Award.

Their album consistently reach the top 5 positions on Japan's Oricon charts. Wagakki Band have performed live in Asia, Europe, and the United States.

== History ==
=== 2012–2013: Conception and early work ===
Shigin singer, Kenshibu dancer and classical pianist Yuko Suzuhana, after having been elected "Miss Nico Nama" at the 2011 Niconico Douga Music Festival, officially formed the folk-acoustic band Hanafugetsu (flower-wind-moon) in February 2012 alongside shakuhachi player Daisuke Kaminaga and koto player Kiyoshi Ibukuro, to play at the same festival the following year. In their concerts they would often be joined by other friend musicians, so Suzuhana conceived a band that would fuse the traditional and modern sides of Japanese culture, leading to the formation of Wagakki Band.

In August 2012 the members of Hanafugetsu met guitarist Shin "Machiya" Oumura, who was a notable session musician with a reputation for fast playing. Around this time, Suzuhana also met drummer Akira "Wasabi" Sasaki at an event by NicoNico Douga. Previous to Hanafugetsu, Ibukuro and Kaminaga were in a folk punk, visual kei band called Crow X Class with wadaiko player Kurona, who happened to be friends with Wasabi too. These first six members started to perform together around Tokyo and Ibaraki. The band's first song was an adaptation of the Vocaloid song "Tsuki Kage Mai Ka" (月・影・舞・華, Moon-Silhouette-Dancing-Flower), featuring Kanade on shamisen and Shirakami Mashiro on bass. A video of the recording of the song was published on Suzuhana's personal Youtube page in November 2012, still released under the name Hanafugetsu, and became immediately viral, remaining to this day one of their most viewed videos.

Bassist Asa, a popular Vocaloid producer and creator of the hit song "Yoshiwara Lament", then officially joined the band in 2013. During a gig in a Shibuya bar, the band was approached by shamisen player Beni Ninagawa, with which Hanafugetsu already performed, and she became the final addition to the band. The formation of the eight-member band was officially announced in March 2013. They initially operated under the name Suzuhana Yuko with Wagakki Band, but by early 2014 the name was shortened to simply Wagakki Band. Suzuhana joked that her and Ibukuro wanted to call the band "Daisuke Kaminaga and his friends".

=== 2013–2014: Early mainstream success ===
A video for the first song recorded by all eight current members of Wagakki Band, "Six Trillion Years and Overnight Story" (六兆年と一夜物語), was released in April 2013. In August of that year they played their first live concert at Nico Nico Music Master 2. The music video for "Tengaku" (天樂) was released in October 2013; this video marked the first time guitarist Machiya revealed his face and identity, having him previously performed under his real name, Shin Oumura, only in his alternative-rock band m:a.ture. They then performed at the 10th Tokyo International Music Market (TIMM) for three nights in October. At THE VOC@LOID M@STER 27, a Vocaloid convention in November 2013, the band released Joshou (序章), a mini-album featuring Vocaloid covers.

Wagakki Band held their first new year's concert, Wagakki Band Daishinnenkai 2014~Wagakki X Band Gassen~ (和楽器バンド大新年会~和楽器Xバンド合戦~), on January 31, 2014 at Shibuya's Club Asia. On the same day, they released the music video for "Senbonzakura" (千本桜), which instantly became a hit on both Nico Nico Douga and YouTube, expanding their international exposure. Wagakki Band covered Vocaloid songs for their first full-length album, Vocalo Zanmai (ボカロ三昧), which was released in April 2014. The album reached no. 5 in the weekly Oricon rankings and stayed in the top 100 for 22 consecutive weeks. After their early Vocaloid works, Wagakki Band has composed original music for their subsequent albums.`

The band held their first overseas performance at Japan Expo 2014 in Paris, France in July, in front of 4,000 attendees. Their first independent concert, Vocalo Zanmai Dai Ensōkai (ボカロ三昧大演奏会), was held later in July at Shibuya's Music Exchange. The music video for Wagakki Band's first original song, "Hanabi" (華火, Fireworks/Flower fire/A flower's burning passion), written by Suzuhana, was released in July 2014. In August they appeared at Japan's a-Nation Festival, followed by an appearance at a-Nation Singapore Premium Showcase Festival in October. The band wrapped up 2014 with the DVD and Blu-ray release of the Vocalo Zanmai Dai Ensōkai concert.

=== 2015–present: International recognition ===
The band's first hall concert, Wagakki Band Daishinnenkai 2015 (和楽器バンド大新年会2015), was held at Shibuya Public Hall in January 2015. Their first independent overseas concert, Taipei Dayanchanghui (台北大演唱会), was held in Taiwan in May of that year. Also in 2015, Wagakki Band headlined a sold-out concert at Club Nokia in Los Angeles in conjunction with Anime Expo, with the software persona Vocaloid IA as the opening act. They appeared in their first television commercial for Kirin Mets. Their first original album, Yasō Emaki (八奏絵卷, Emaki of an octet playing music), was released in September 2015 and reached number one on the weekly Oricon chart.

On 6 January 2016, the band held its annual New Year's concert, Wagakki Band Daishinnenkai 2016 Nippon Budokan: Akatsuki no Utage (和楽器バンド大新年会2016日本武道館 -暁ノ宴) at the Nippon Budokan. The concert was attended by approximately 10,000 people.

The album Shikisai (四季彩, Colors of the four seasons) was released in 2017, featuring the previously released single "Kishikaisei" (起死回生, Death and Rebirth), which was used by TV Tokyo for their broadcast of the 2016 Summer Olympics in Rio de Janeiro and as the official song for the Japanese team. The following year they released the concept album Otonoe (オトノエ), which peaked at No. 2 on Oricon's albums chart and received the Excellent Album Award at the 60th Japan Record Awards.

In May 2019, Wagakki Band performed as part of Japan Night 2019 in New York with Hyde, Misia, and Puffy AmiYumi. A month later, the band signed a global contract with Universal Music Japan sublabel Universal Sigma after five years with Avex Group. As part of the deal, the band's management was transferred to the newly formed Ignite Management (イグナイトマネージメント, Igunaito Manējimento). According to a press statement published by Suzuhana, the band wanted to challenge themselves in a new musical environment. The EP React, featuring four new songs, was released in December 2019.

On February 16, 2020, the band performed their two-day Premium Symphonic Night concert at Osaka-jō Hall, featuring a full orchestra and a special guest appearance by Evanescence lead vocalist Amy Lee. Lee also collaborated with the band in recording the single "Sakura Rising", co-written by Lee, Suzuhana and Machiya. The band's fifth studio album, Tokyo Singing, which includes the collaboration with Lee, was released in October 2020.

On August 17, 2022, the band released their sixth studio album, and second cover album, Vocalo Zanmai 2, to commemorate their eighth anniversary. Four days later, at the start of the national tour, Suzuhana and Ibukuro announced that they had married on March 4, 2020, and were now expecting their first child. On September 22, the band announced they would hold the rest of their Vocalo Zanmai 2 tour without Suzuhana due to her pregnancy and health issues, with the other seven members playing accompanied by Suzuhana's recorded voice or with Machiya, Asa and Beni singing her parts, marking the debut of Beni as a singer. Still hospitalized in isolation due to COVID-19 restrictions, Suzuhana gave birth to a baby girl on November 24, the day before the tour ended.

The band's seventh studio album, I vs I, was released on July 26, 2023 followed by a national tour, at the end of which, on January 7, 2024, the band announced that at the end of 2024 after celebrating their 10th anniversary, the band would go on an indefinite hiatus so that each member could focus on their own activities. A compilation album titled All Time Best Album Thanks: Yasō no Oto, as well as the live video Wagakki Band Daishinnenkai 2024 Nippon Budokan: Yae no Tsubasa, were released on October 9.

== Members ==
- Yuko Suzuhana (鈴華ゆう子) – vocals, piano
- Kiyoshi Ibukuro (いぶくろ聖志) – koto
- Daisuke Kaminaga (神永大輔) – shakuhachi
- Beni Ninagawa (蜷川べに) – tsugaru shamisen
- Kurona (黒流) – wadaiko, kakegoe vocals
- Machiya (町屋) – guitar, vocals
- Asa (亜沙) – bass
- Wasabi (山葵) – drums

== Discography ==
- Vocalo Zanmai (2014)
- Yasō Emaki (2015)
- Shikisai (2017)
- Otonoe (2018)
- Tokyo Singing (2020)
- Vocalo Zanmai 2 (2022)
- I vs I (2023)

== Awards ==
Year	Ceremony	Award	Nominated work
2015	Japan Gold Disc Award	Best 5 New Artists	
2015	Japan Record Awards	Planning Award	Yasō Emaki
2018	Japan Record Awards	Excellent Album Award	Otonoe
