= Senbonzakura (song) =

Japanese Vocaloid song

Single by KurousaP/WhiteFlame featuring Hatsune Miku

from the album 5th Anniversary Best
- Language: Japanese
- Released: 17 September 2011
- Genre: Vocaloid music
- Length: 4:04
- Label: Dwango
- Songwriter: KurousaP/WhiteFlame
- Producer: KurousaP/WhiteFlame

Music video
- "Senbonzakura" on YouTube

"Senbonzakura" (Japanese: 千本桜; lit. 'a thousand blossom cherry trees') is a 2011 song written by Japanese music producer Kurousa-P (黒うさP), better known as WhiteFlame (ホワイトフレイム), utilizing the Vocaloid 2 voicebank Hatsune Miku. First posted onto video sharing site Niconico on 17 September 2011, and released as a commercial single on 29 February 2012, the song quickly became viral and inspired multiple cover versions and other derivative works.

== Release and reception ==
"Senbonzakura" was first posted onto Niconico on 17 September 2011 by Kurousa-P. Accompanied by a fast rock-inspired beat, the lyrics reference the Meiji Restoration and the Taishō era. The accompanying music video, illustrated by Ittomaru (一斗まる), similarly draws inspiration from the same time period, and features Hatsune Miku in a military-esque uniform, among other Vocaloid characters like Kagamine Rin & Len, Kaito, Meiko, and Megurine Luka, all in traditional Japanese outfits.

After its release on Niconico the music video went viral and broke one million views in 42 days (29 October that year). The song was also very popular among karaoke singers, and Joysound, a karaoke store chain, reported that "Senbonzakura" was the third most sung song in 2012 behind AKB48's "Heavy Rotation" and Golden Bomber's "Memeshikute". As of November 2025, "Senbonzakura" remains the most-viewed Vocaloid song on Niconico at approximately 18 million plays on the website. The song was performed by Sachiko Kobayashi on the 66th NHK Kōhaku Uta Gassen. Hatsune Miku also regularly performs "Senbonzakura" during her concerts.

== Wagakki Band version ==
"Senbonzakura"

Song by Wagakki Band

from the album Vocalo Zanmai
- Language: Japanese
- Released: 23 April 2014
- Genre: J-pop; heavy metal; folk rock
- Length: 4:30
- Label: Avex Trax
- Songwriter: Kurousa-P

Music video
- "Senbonzakura" on YouTube

Wagakki Band covered "Senbonzakura" and released their music video on YouTube on 31 January 2014. The video was shot at Nakoso no Seki in Iwaki, Fukushima. The cover introduced the world to the band's style of mixing traditional Japanese musical instruments (wagakki) with heavy metal (folk metal), and it is the most well-known song in their discography. In 2019, the video broke 100 million views.

== Other derivative works ==
To celebrate the video's first anniversary, on 12 September 2012, an album titled All That Senbonzakura! was released by Dwango. The album only contained "Senbonzakura" covered by different instruments, including piano, yangqin, acoustic guitar, and string quartet. Other solo artists have also released their own covers of the song.

The music video's illustrator, Ittomaru, went on to release several works adapted from the song. On 9 March 2013, Ittomaru released a light novel series based on the song published by ASCII Media Works. The novel is set in a dystopian world where the Taishō era continued for a hundred years and features Hatsune Miku as the main protagonist. The first volume topped Oricon's weekly novel sales chart and was also the thirteenth bestselling book for the month. The same month, Niconico hosted a musical based on the novel's storyline and featured AKB48 members Haruka Ishida, Maho Tomita, and Miori Ichikawa as well as actor Kazuki Kato.

== Accolades ==
Award nominations for "Senbonzakura"
Year	Award	Category	Result	Ref.
2025	Music Awards Japan	Best Vocaloid Culture Song	Won	

== Charts ==
All That Senbonzakura! (ALL THAT 千本桜!!)
Chart	Peak position
Oricon Albums Chart	56
Billboard Japan Top Album Sales	48

== Certifications ==
Certifications for "Senbonzakura" original version
Region	Certification	Certified units/sales
Japan (RIAJ) Digital	Gold	100,000^{*}
Certifications for "Senbonzakura" Wagakki Band cover
Japan (RIAJ) Digital	Gold	100,000^{*}
^{*} Sales figures based on certification alone.
