= Wagakki Band Daishinnenkai 2019 Saitama Super Arena 2 Days: Ryūgū no Tobira =

Video by Wagakki Band
- Released: March 20, 2019
- Recorded: January 5–6, 2019
- Venue: Saitama Super Arena
- Genres: J-pop; heavy metal; folk rock
- Language: Japanese
- Label: Avex Trax

Wagakki Band chronology
Wagakki Band Daishinnenkai 2018 Yokohama Arena: Ashita e no Kōkai (2018)	Wagakki Band Daishinnenkai 2019 Saitama Super Arena 2 Days: Ryūgū no Tobira (2019)	Manatsu no Daishinnenkai 2020 Yokohama Arena: Tenkyū no Kakehashi (2020)

Music video
- Wagakki Band Daishinnenkai 2019 Saitama Super Arena 2 Days: Ryūgū no Tobira all songs digest on YouTube

Wagakki Band Daishinnenkai 2019 Saitama Super Arena 2 Days: Ryūgū no Tobira (和楽器バンド 大新年会2019さいたまスーパーアリーナ2days ～竜宮ノ扉～, Wagakki Band New Year's Party 2019 Saitama Super Arena 2 Days: Door to the Dragon Palace) is the sixth live video album by Japanese band Wagakki Band, released on March 20, 2019 by Avex Trax in four editions: two-disc DVD, two-disc Blu-ray, and two Live CD editions. In addition, a mu-mo Shop exclusive release includes all editions and bonus DVD and Blu-ray copies of the band's Dai 36-kai Seikaiisan Gekijō ~ Munakata Taisha Wagakki Band Tandoku wo Hōnō Live (第36回 世界遺産劇場～宗像大社 和楽器バンド単独御奉納ライブ; 36th World Heritage Theater: Munakata Taisha Wagakki Band Solo Dedication Live) concert. The video covers the band's two-day concert at the Saitama Super Arena on January 5–6, 2019. It was the band's final release with Avex Trax before their contract expired and they signed with Universal Music Japan in June of that year.

The video peaked at No. 5 on Oricon's DVD chart and No. 10 on Oricon's Blu-ray chart.

== Track listing ==
All tracks are arranged by Wagakki Band.

DVD/Blu-ray
No.	Title	Writer(s)	Length
1.	"Overture ~Ryūgū no Tobira~" ((Overture～竜宮ノ扉～; "Overture ~Door to the Dragon Palace~"))
2.	"Hikari no Naka de" ((光の中で; "In the Light"))	Machiya
3.	"Hakanaku mo Utsukushii no wa" ((「儚くも美しいのは」; "What is Ephemeral and Beautiful"))	Machiya
4.	"Hana Ichimonme" ((花一匁))	Kiyoshi Ibukuro; Yuko Suzuhana
5.	"Senbonzakura" ((千本桜; "A Thousand Sakura"))	Kurousa-P
6.	"EinzelKampf (Bass x Shakuhachi) [Sen no Tobira]" ((EinzelKampf（Bass×尺八）【遷ノ扉】))	Asa; Daisuke Kaminaga
7.	"Yuki yo Maichire Sonata ni Mukete [Sen no Tobira]" ((雪よ舞い散れ其方に向けて【遷ノ扉】; "Snow Dancing and Falling Towards You"))	Asa
8.	"Synchronicity [Sen no Tobira]" (Shinkuronishiti (シンクロニシティ【遷ノ扉】))	Suzuhana
9.	"Zense no Kioku (Koto x Mai) [Sen no Tobira]" ((前世の記憶 （箏×舞）【遷ノ扉】; "Memories of the Previous Life (Koto x Dance)"))	Ibukuro
10.	"Sabaku no Komoriuta [Sen no Tobira]" ((砂漠の子守唄【遷ノ扉】; "Desert Lullaby"))	Suzuhana
11.	"Sasameyuki [Yū no Tobira]" ((細雪【憂ノ扉】; "Light Snowfall"))	Machiya
12.	"Okinotayuu [Yū no Tobira]" ((オキノタユウ【憂ノ扉】; "Albatross"))	Machiya
13.	"Finite Limits (Guitar x Tsugaru-shamisen) [Mai no Tobira]" ((Finite limits （Guitar×津軽三味線）【舞ノ扉】))	Machiya; Beni Ninagawa
14.	"Strong Fate [Mai no Tobira]"	Suzuhana
15.	"Ikusa [Mai no Tobira]" ((戦-ikusa-【舞ノ扉】; "War"))	Asa
16.	"Sōhan Yūgō (Drum x Wadaiko) [Mai no Tobira]" ((相反融合 （Drum×和太鼓）【舞ノ扉】; "Reciprocal Fusion (Drum x Wadaiko)))	Wasabi; Kurona
17.	"Hakushu Kassai [Mai no Tobira]" ((拍手喝采【舞ノ扉】; "Applause"))	Kurona
18.	"Gifū Ranbu [Mai no Tobira]" ((義風乱舞【舞ノ扉】; "Wild Dance of the Righteous Wind"))	Suzuhana
19.	"Hoshizukiyo [Mai no Tobira]" ((星月夜【舞ノ扉】; "Starry Night"))	Machiya
20.	"Chikyū Saigo no Kokuhaku wo [Mai no Tobira]" ((地球最後の告白を【舞ノ扉】; "The Earth's Final Confession"))	Kemu
21.	"Akatsuki no Ito [Mai no Tobira]" ((暁ノ糸【舞ノ扉】; "The Thread of Dawn"))	Machiya
22.	"Hanabi [Encore]" ((華火【ENCORE】; "Fireworks"))	Suzuhana
23.	"Appare ga Seigi. [Encore]" ((あっぱれが正義。【ENCORE】; "Appreciation Is Justice."))	Suzuhana
24.	"Sora no Kiwami e [Encore]" ((空の極みへ【ENCORE】; "To the Limit of the Sky"))	Ibukuro; Cue-Q

Live CD Edition DVD/Blu-ray Disc 2
No.	Title	Length
1.	"Wagakki Band Daishinnenkai 2019 Saitama Super Arena 2 Days: Ryūgū no Tobira Making" ((「和楽器バンド大新年会2019 さいたまスーパーアリーナ2days ～竜宮ノ扉～」MAKING))
2.	"Gifū Ranbu Member-betsu Saisei" ((「義風乱舞」メンバー別再生; "Gifū Ranbu Member Playback"))

mu-mo Shop exclusive DVD/Blu-ray
No.	Title	Writer(s)	Length
1.	"Overture ~Fuhai no Mori~" ((Overture～腐敗ノ森～; "Overture ~The Corrupt Forest~"))
2.	"Sabaku no Komoriuta"	Suzuhana
3.	"Shizumanai Taiyō" ((沈まない太陽; "The Sun That Never Sets"))	Kurona
4.	"Ikusa"	Asa
5.	"Shigin - Getsuya Sansakō ni Fune wo Ukabu -" ((詩吟 -月夜三叉口に舟を泛ぶ-; "Shigin - Pulling a Boat at the Three-pronged Mouth of the Moonlit Night -"))	Suzuhana
6.	"Sasameyuki"	Machiya
7.	"Synchronicity"	Suzuhana
8.	"Tōno Monogatari Shi-shi" ((遠野物語四四; "Tono Story 44"))	Beni Ninagawa
9.	"Ritsudō Yūgi/Inori" ((律動遊戯・祈; "Rhythm Play/Prayer"))
10.	"Senbonzakura"	Kurousa-P
11.	"Okinotayuu"	Machiya
12.	"Hotarubi" ((蛍火; "Fireflies"))	Machiya
13.	"Yuki Kageboushi" ((雪影ぼうし; "Snow Silhouette"))	Suzuhana
14.	"Ryūsei" ((流星; "Falling Stars"))	Machiya
15.	"Hoshizukiyo"	Machiya
16.	"Perfect Blue"	Asa
17.	"Dai 36-kai Seikaiisan Gekijō ~ Munakata Taisha Wagakki Band Tandoku wo Hōnō Live Off-shot" ((「第36回 世界遺産劇場～宗像大社 和楽器バンド単独御奉納ライブ」オフショット))

== Personnel ==
- Yuko Suzuhana – vocals
- Machiya – guitar
- Beni Ninagawa – tsugaru shamisen
- Kiyoshi Ibukuro – koto
- Asa – bass
- Daisuke Kaminaga – shakuhachi
- Wasabi – drums
- Kurona – wadaiko

== Charts ==
Chart (2019)	Peak position
Japanese DVD Sales (Oricon)	5
Blu-ray Sales (Oricon)	10
