= Hanafugetsu =

Japanese band

Hanafugetsu 華風月
- Origin: Japan
- Genres: Folk; Ambient; Classical; Jazz; J-pop
- Years active: 2012 – present
- Label: KMC Records
- Spinoffs: Wagakki Band
- Members: Yuko Suzuhana; Daisuke Kaminaga; Kiyoshi Ibukuro
- Website: hanafugetsu.com

Hanafugetsu (華風月; "Flower Wind Moon") is a Japanese band formed in 2012, consisting of pianist, lead vocalist and shigin recitalist Yuko Suzuhana, shakuhachi player Daisuke Kaminaga, and 25-string koto player Kiyoshi Ibukuro. A part for their Shigin reinterpretations, all of their music is composed by Suzuhana and Ibukuro. In concert the music is often accompanied by Suzuhana's Kenshibu.

The trio became the basis for the fusion metal band Wagakki Band.

== History ==
In 2011, Shigin singer Yuko Suzuhana, who had been elected Miss Nico Nama ニコ生 in 2011 Niconico Douga Music Festival, recruited Kiyoshi Ibukuro and Daisuke Kaminaga to perform on the NicoNico Chōkaigi stage the following year. In February 2012, the trio officially debuted as Hanafugetsu.

The name symbolizes the image of each member: Suzuhana = Hana (華; Flower), Kaminaga = Fū (風; Wind), Ibukuro = Mangetsu (月; Moon). It was derived from the Japanese philosophical and artistic concept of Kachoufugetsu (花鳥風月, flower-bird-wind-moon), which refers to the ability to appreciate and be mesmerized by the beauty of nature. Ibukuro explained that the "missing bird" is the combine sound of the three members together that is now free to fly and dance around their audience. Many of their lyrics are in reference to poetries and natural themes.

== Members ==
- Yuko Suzuhana (鈴華 ゆう子, Suzuhana Yūko) – vocals, piano, sanshin
- Daisuke Kaminaga (神永 大輔, Kaminaga Daisuke) – shakuhachi
- Kiyoshi Ibukuro (いぶくろ 聖志, Ibukuro Kiyoshi) – koto

== Discography ==
=== Studio albums ===
Title	Album details	Peak positions
Title	Album details	JPN Oricon
Kojō no Tsuki, Ruten no Hana (The moon over the lake, the flux of a flower)	Released: May 19, 2013; Label: KMC Records; Formats: CD	—
Theme of Hanafugetsu	Released: January 19, 2014; Label: KMC Records; Formats: CD	—
Ame ga Aketara (When the rain clears)	Released: June 18, 2014; Label: KMC Records; Formats: CD	—
Awaki Utsutsu ni Yume Kasane (Layered dreams in the fleeting reality)	Released: June 7, 2017; Label: KMC Records; Formats: CD	31
Masayume: Hanafugetsu Selection (A dream that came true)	Released: September 4, 2024; Label: KMC Records; Formats: CD	TBA
"—" denotes a recording that did not chart or was not released in that territory.

=== Mini-albums ===
Title	Album details
Tsuki ni Terasare, Kaze ni Yureru Hana (A flower illuminated by the moon and swaying in the wind)	Released: January 9, 2017; Label: KMC Records; Formats: CD

=== Singles ===
Title	Year	Album
"Karappo Robot"	2020	Non-album single

== See also ==
- Wagakki Band
