= Shan Xing =

Poem by Du Mu

Shan Xing (Chinese: 山行; pinyin: Shān Xíng) is a popular Chinese Tang Dynasty poem, by Chinese poet Du Mu (Chinese: 杜牧; pinyin: Dù Mù).

The poem has been translated into English and other languages multiple times, including in A.C. Graham's Poems of the Late T'ang (1965), David Hinton's Classical Chinese Poetry (2000), and Michael A. Fuller's An Introduction to Chinese Poetry (2017).

The poem is a cheerful depiction of the "splendid scenery in autumn without a trace of sadness".

== The poem ==
Chinese	Pinyin
遠上寒山石徑斜， 白雲生處有人家， 停車坐愛楓林晚， 霜葉紅於二月花。	Yuǎn shàng hán shān shí jìng xié, báiyún shēng chù yǒu rén jiā, tíngchē zuò ài fēnglín wǎn, shuāngyè hóng yú èryuè huā.

== Rough translation ==
Going to a distant mountain to climbing the stone path,
people reside in the depth of white clouds.
I had to stop my carriage to admire the beauty of maple trees,
where the frosted leaves are as red as the February flowers (spring flowers).

== See also ==
- Tang poetry
