= Manatsu no Daishinnenkai 2020 Yokohama Arena: Tenkyū no Kakehashi =

Video by Wagakki Band
- Released: December 9, 2020
- Recorded: August 15, 2020
- Venue: Yokohama Arena
- Genre: J-pop; heavy metal; folk rock
- Language: Japanese
- Label: Universal Sigma

Wagakki Band chronology
Wagakki Band Daishinnenkai 2019 Saitama Super Arena 2 Days: Ryūgū no Tobira (2019)	Manatsu no Daishinnenkai 2020 Yokohama Arena: Tenkyū no Kakehashi (2020)	Daishinnenkai 2021 Nippon Budokan: Amanoiwato (2021)

Music video
- Manatsu no Daishinnenkai 2020 Yokohama Arena: Tenkyū no Kakehashi all songs digest on YouTube

Manatsu no Daishinnenkai 2020 Yokohama Arena: Tenkyū no Kakehashi (真夏の大新年会 2020 横浜アリーナ 〜天球の架け橋〜, Midsummer New Year's Party 2020 Yokohama Arena: Bridge of the Celestial Sphere) is the seventh live video album by Japanese band Wagakki Band, released on December 9, 2020 by Universal Sigma in four editions: DVD, Blu-ray, Live CD Edition DVD, and Live CD Edition Blu-ray with 60-page photo book. The video covers the band's concert at the Yokohama Arena on August 15, 2020.

The video peaked at No. 6 on Oricon's DVD chart and No. 4 on Oricon's Blu-ray chart.

== Track listing ==
All tracks are arranged by Wagakki Band.

DVD/Blu-ray
No.	Title	Writer(s)	Length
1.	"Overture ~Tenkyū no Kakehashi~" ((Overture～天球の架け橋～, "Overture ~Bridge of the Celestial Sphere~"))
2.	"Izana"	Yuko Suzuhana
3.	"Ignite"	Machiya
4.	"Valkyrie" ((Valkyrie‐戦乙女‐))	Asa
5.	"Iroha Uta" ((いろは唄, "Iroha Song"))	Ginsaku
6.	"Tomodachi Ninarouyo" ((トモダチニナロウヨ))	Kiyoshi Ibukuro; Beni Ninagawa; Machiya
7.	"World Domination"	Suzuhana
8.	"Kishikaisei" ((起死回生, "Death and Rebirth"))	Kurona
9.	"Okinotayuu" ((オキノタユウ, "Albatross"))	Machiya
10.	"Interlude"
11.	"Rasho no Mon" ((羅生ノ門))	Machiya; Kurona
12.	"Break Out"	Kurona
13.	"Synchronicity" (Shinkuronishiti (シンクロニシティ))	Suzuhana
14.	"Watashi Shijō Shugi" ((ワタシ・至上主義, "My Supreme Principle"))	Ninagawa
15.	"Drum Wadaiko Battle ~ Kyōei Todoroki-dan ~" ((ドラム和太鼓バトル〜響映轟弾〜))	Wasabi; Kurona
16.	"Yuki Kageboushi" ((雪影ぼうし, "Snow Silhouette"))	Suzuhana
17.	"Chikyū Saigo no Kokuhaku wo" ((地球最後の告白を, "The Earth's Final Confession"))	Kemu
18.	"Joukei Effector" (Jōkei Efekutā (情景エフェクター, "Scene Effector"))	Asa
19.	"EN1. Akatsuki no Ito" ((EN1. 暁ノ糸, "The Thread of Dawn"))	Machiya
20.	"EN2. Singin' for..."	Wasabi
21.	"EN3. Senbonzakura" ((EN3. 千本桜, "A Thousand Sakura"))	Kurousa-P

== Personnel ==
- Yuko Suzuhana – vocals
- Machiya – guitar
- Beni Ninagawa – tsugaru shamisen
- Kiyoshi Ibukuro – koto
- Asa – bass
- Daisuke Kaminaga – shakuhachi
- Wasabi – drums
- Kurona – wadaiko

== Charts ==
Chart (2020)	Peak position
Japanese DVD Sales (Oricon)	6
Blu-ray Sales (Oricon)	4
