= Lüzhu =

Ancient Chinese female singer and dancer

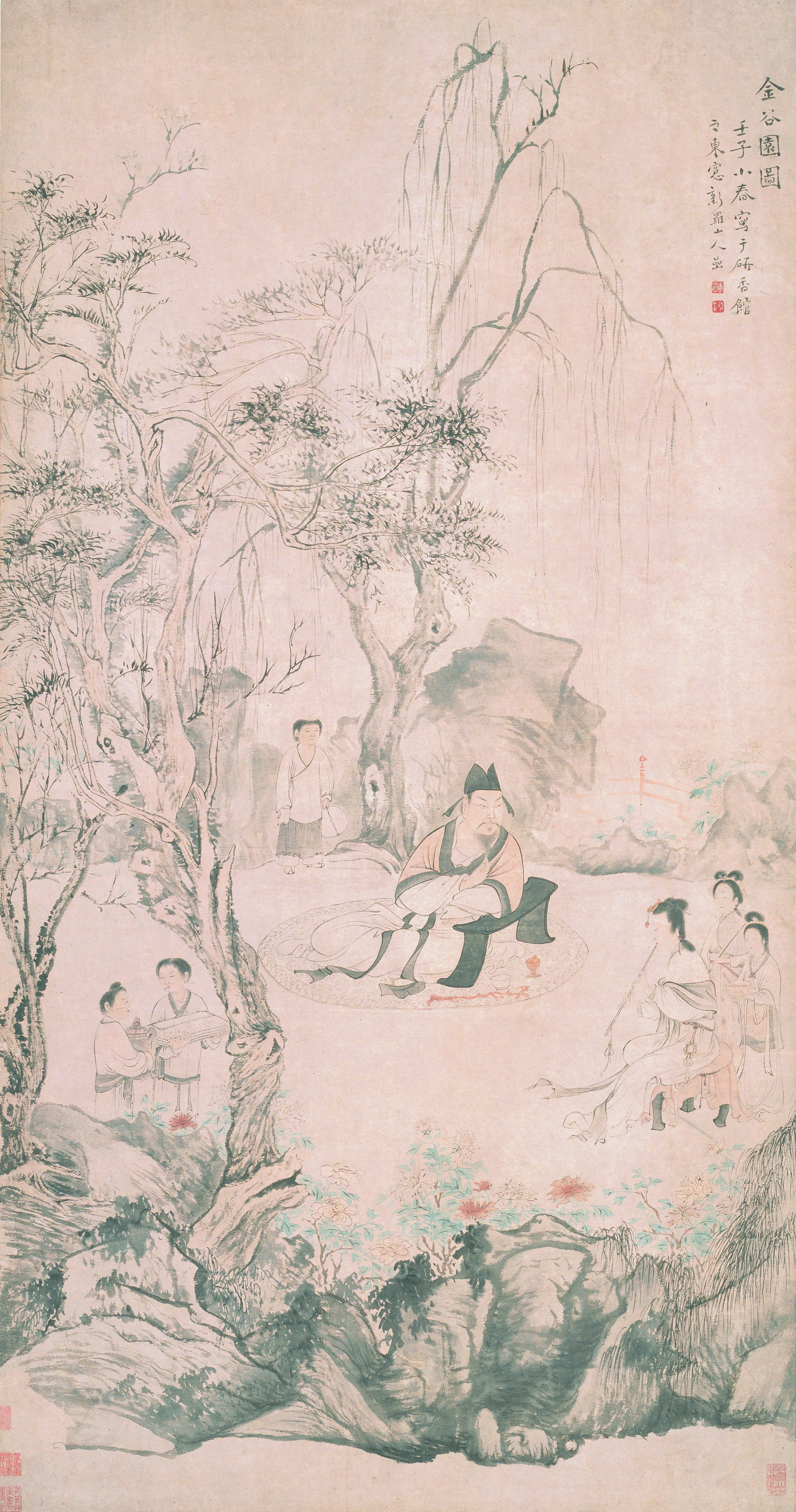
The painting Golden Valley Villa by Hua Yan, 1732, depicting Shi Chong listening to the music of Lüzhu, Shanghai Museum

Lüzhu (simplified Chinese: 绿珠; traditional Chinese: 綠珠; pinyin: Lǜ zhū; lit. 'green pearl'; died 300) also called Liang, was an Ancient Chinese courtesan, dancer and music teacher.

She was bought by Shi Chong (249–300), an official of Emperor Wu of Jin, and was his concubine. She became famous for her artistry and beauty, as she entertained his guests as a courtesan and dancer. She also composed music, and made poetry into songs by composing music for it. The famous composition Aonao qu has been attributed to both her as well as to Shi Chong.

When a high official from the Imperial court -Shi Chong's rival, Sung Xiu - demanded to buy her, Shi Chong refused to sell. Shi Chong was then arrested and ordered to commit suicide, upon which Lüzhu herself committed suicide.

Lüzhu is depicted in the Wu Shuang Pu (無雙譜, Table of Peerless Heroes) by Jin Guliang.

== See also ==
- Jin'gu Villa
