= List of Ninjala episodes =

Ninjala is an anime television series and an adaptation of the Ninjala video game. The anime is produced by OLM and premiered on TV Tokyo on January 8, 2022. The series was directed by Mamoru Kanbe up until episode 63, with Nanako Shimazaki taking over the role starting from episode 64. Kenji Konuta handled series composition starting from episode 27. Atsushi Suzuki is designing the characters and Takahiro Obata is composing the music. Up until episode 40, the opening theme song "Maybe Baby" was performed by Kyary Pamyu Pamyu. From episode 41 to episode 112, the opening theme song "Isshin Doutai" was also performed by Kyary Pamyu Pamyu. Since episode 113 the new opening theme song is "OEDOEDO" by Kyary Pamyu Pamyu. While up until episode 19, Wolpis Kater and NayutalieN performed the ending theme song "Ninjalaic Ninja". From episode 20 and up until episode 40, the ending theme song "SHINOBI TOP SECRET" was performed by Wienners. From episode 41 and up until episode 57, the anime presented another ending theme song, named "Friendship March" which is performed by Fantastic Paisen. From episode 58 to episode 65, the ending theme, titled "Ninja Remotion" was performed by Ange☆Reve. From episode 66 to episode 79, the anime revealed a 5th ending theme song, titled "Radice" which is performed by Wolpis Kater and Neru. From episode 80 to episode 100, another ending theme song was unveiled, titled, "Appare! Extreme Ninja" by SHARE LOCK HOMES. From episode 101 to episode 124, the ending theme, named "You and Doron in Broad Daylight" by Pop Shinanaide, was played. From episode 125 to episode 148, the ending theme was "TKG Syndrome" by Miyu Kaneko. From episode 149 to episode 172, the ending theme was "Night Before A Dance" by Panda Dragon. Starting with episode 173, the new ending theme is "Kesara Basara" by Yuko Suzuhana. The anime began streaming with English subtitles on the game's official YouTube channel on January 13, 2022. Episodes are released every Thursday at 7:00 p.m. (PT) and only available for one week.

== Episodes ==
No.	Title	Directed by (Note: Information is taken from the ending credits of each episode.)	Written by	Storyboarded by	Original release date
1	"Ninja-Gum Perfected"; Transliteration: "Kansei! Ninja Gamu!" (Japanese: 完成！ニンジャガム！)	Ryō Nakano	Yoshifumi Fukushima	Ryō Nakano	January 8, 2022
2	"A Long Day for Burton and Berecca"; Transliteration: "Bāton to Berekka no Nagai Ichinichi" (Japanese: バートンとベレッカの長い一日)	Michita Shiraishi	Kenjin Sata	Hiroyuki Yano	January 15, 2022
3	"Awaken Young Van!"; Transliteration: "Mezameyo! Shōnen Bān!" (Japanese: 目覚めよ！少年バーン！)	Yoshihiko Iwata	Yūka Aoki	Masakatsu Iijima	January 22, 2022
4	"Lucy and the Mysterious Eye"; Transliteration: "Himitsu no Hitomi no Rūshī" (Japanese: 秘密の瞳のルーシー)	Nanako Shimazaki	Shōji Yonemura	Tomoko Iwasaki	January 29, 2022
5	"Ninja Dancer Emma"; Transliteration: "Ninja Dansā Ema" (Japanese: ニンジャダンサー・エマ)	Shigeki Awai	Shūichi Kōyama	Nanako Shimazaki	February 5, 2022
6	"WNA Academy – Let the Battles Begin"; Transliteration: "Daburyū Enu Ei Akademī! Batoru Sutāto!" (Japanese: WNAアカデミー！バトルスタート！)	Takeshi Yoshimoto	Shinji Satō	Masakatsu Iijima	February 12, 2022
7	"Kappei of the Shinobi Village"; Transliteration: "Shinobi no Sato no Kappei" (Japanese: シノビの里のカッペイ)	Sumito Sasaki	Yoshifumi Fukushima	Yamato Tabisawa	February 19, 2022
8	"Infiltrating WNA HQ"; Transliteration: "Kesshi no Sennyū! Daburyū Enu Ei Honbu!" (Japanese: 決死の潜入！WNA本部！)	Kazuya Fujishiro	Kenjin Sata	Akihiro Enomoto	February 26, 2022
9	"Emma and Lucy's Fun-sized Adventure"; Transliteration: "Ema to Rūshī – Chīsana Bōken" (Japanese: エマとルーシー 小さな冒険)	Shigeki Awai	Shōji Yonemura	Tomoko Iwasaki	March 5, 2022
10	"New Friends? – Ron & Jane"; Transliteration: "Arata na Nakama? Ron to Jēn" (Japanese: 新たな仲間？ロンとジェーン)	Yoshihiko Iwata	Yūka Aoki	Nanako Shimazaki	March 12, 2022
11	"Mission: Survival"; Transliteration: "Jigoku no Sabaibaru Misshon" (Japanese: 地獄のサバイバルミッション)	Michita Shiraishi	Shūichi Kōyama	Masakatsu Iijima	March 19, 2022
12	"Hide and Seek with the Unknown"; Transliteration: "Kakurenbo de Michi to no Sōgū" (Japanese: かくれんぼで未知との遭遇)	Takeshi Yoshimoto	Kenji Konuta	Shigetaka Ikeda	March 26, 2022
13	"Captured Ninja"; Transliteration: "Ninja Hokakuchū" (Japanese: ニンジャ捕獲中)	Fukutarō Hattori	Shinji Satō	Akihiro Enomoto	April 2, 2022
14	"Tailing Burton"; Transliteration: "Bāton o Bikō Seyo" (Japanese: バートンを尾行せよ)	Takeyuki Sadohara	Yoshifumi Fukushima	Tomoko Iwasaki	April 9, 2022
15	"Space Ninjas"; Transliteration: "Sono Na wa Supēsu Ninja!" (Japanese: その名はスペースニンジャ！)	Chika Genhen	Shōji Yonemura	Masakatsu Iijima	April 16, 2022
16	"Shinobi's Duty"; Transliteration: "Shinobi no Tsutome" (Japanese: シノビの務め)	Nanako Shimazaki	Kenjin Sata	Nanako Shimazaki	April 23, 2022
17	"Ron and Jane's Infiltration Mission"; Transliteration: "Ron to Jēn no Sennyū Misshon" (Japanese: ロンとジェーンの潜入ミッション)	Shigeki Awai	Yūka Aoki	Shigetaka Ikeda	April 30, 2022
18	"Headed Home into the Sunset"; Transliteration: "Taiyō ni Mukatte Kaere" (Japanese: 夕陽に向かって帰れ)	Kazuya Fujishiro	Shinji Satō	Akihiro Enomoto	May 7, 2022
19	"Oranje Sea Terror"; Transliteration: "Oranjī no Naku Umi" (Japanese: オランジイのなく海)	Fukutarō Hattori	Shūichi Kōyama	Hiroyuki Yano	May 14, 2022
20	"Leonard the Runaway"; Transliteration: "Tōbōsha Renādo" (Japanese: 逃亡者レナード)	Ryō Nakano	Kenji Konuta	Ryō Nakano	May 21, 2022
21	"Tales from the Oedo Hot Springs"; Transliteration: "Oedo Onsen Monogatari" (Japanese: オエド温泉物語)	Matsuo Asami	Yoshifumi Fukushima	Shigetaka Ikeda	May 28, 2022
22	"Burton & Chocomin"; Transliteration: "Bāton to Chokomin" (Japanese: バートンとチョコミン)	Fukutarō Hattori	Shōji Yonemura	Koji Iwai	June 4, 2022
23	"Summer Siege on Eagle City"; Transliteration: "Īguru Shiti Natsu no Jin" (Japanese: イーグルシティ夏の陣)	Takeyuki Sadohara	Shūichi Kōyama	Masakatsu Iijima	June 11, 2022
24	"Battling Shadows"; Transliteration: "Kage to no Tatakai" (Japanese: カゲとの戦い)	Shigeki Awai	Yūka Aoki	Tomoko Iwasaki	June 18, 2022
25	"Operation Oedo Ninjas – Part 1"; Transliteration: "Oedo Ninja dai Sakusen! Zenpen" (Japanese: オエドニンジャ大作戦！前編)	Yukihiro Matsushita	Kenjin Sata	Takeyuki Sadohara	June 25, 2022
26	"Operation Oedo Ninjas – Part 2"; Transliteration: "Oedo Ninja dai Sakusen! Kōhen" (Japanese: オエドニンジャ大作戦！後編)	Fukutarō Hattori	Kenjin Sata	Akihiro Enomoto	July 2, 2022
27	"The Ninjala Championship"; Transliteration: "Kaisai! Ninjara Chanpionshippu" (Japanese: 開催！ニンジャラCS)	Nanako Shimazaki	Kenji Konuta	Nanako Shimazaki	July 9, 2022
28	"Burton VS Berecca"; Transliteration: "Bāton bui esu Berekka!" (Japanese: バートンVSベレッカ！)	Kazuya Fujishiro	Shinji Satō	Masakatsu Iijima	July 16, 2022
29	"Keith – The Dainty Diner"; Transliteration: "Bishoku Ninja Kīsu Kenzan" (Japanese: 美食ニンジャ・キース見参)	Mitsutaka Noshitani	Yoshifumi Fukushima	Shigetaka Ikeda	July 23, 2022
30	"Dan & Tyler"; Transliteration: "Dan to Tairā" (Japanese: ダンとタイラー)	Matsuo Asami	Shūichi Kōyama	Tomoko Iwasaki	July 30, 2022
31	"Stealing Back Stolen Treasure"; Transliteration: "Ike Kappei! Aramakizake!" (Japanese: 行けカッペイ！新巻鮭！)	Takeyuki Sadohara	Yūka Aoki	Koji Iwai	August 6, 2022
32	"Van – Burning Ninja Spirit"; Transliteration: "Bān! Moyase Ninja Tamashī!" (Japanese: バーン！燃やせニンジャ魂！)	Nanako Shimazaki	Kenjin Sata	Nanako Shimazaki	August 13, 2022
33	"Blueprint for a New Lucy"; Transliteration: "Rūshī Kaizō Keikaku" (Japanese: ルーシー改造計画)	Fumihiro Ueno	Kenji Konuta	Hiroyuki Yano	August 20, 2022
34	"Survival Battle Finals"; Transliteration: "Sabaibaru Batoru Kesshōsen!" (Japanese: サバイバルバトル決勝戦！)	Seung Hui Son	Yoshifumi Fukushima	Masakatsu Iijima	August 27, 2022
35	"The New Ninjala Master"; Transliteration: "Kettei! Ninjara Masutā!" (Japanese: 決定！ニンジャラマスター！)	Fukutarō Hattori	Shūichi Kōyama	Akihiro Enomoto	September 3, 2022
36	"Ninja Beach Break"; Transliteration: "Bīchi de Ninja gya Kyūsoku" (Japanese: ビーチでニンジャが休息)	Kazuya Fujishiro	Shinji Satō	Yukihiro Matsushita	September 10, 2022
37	"Touring Oedo Town"; Transliteration: "Oedo Taun Burari" (Japanese: オエドタウン・ぶらり)	Nanako Shimazaki	Yūka Aoki	Nanako Shimazaki	September 17, 2022
38	"Fright Night at the Academy"; Transliteration: "Kyōfu! Akademī no Yoru" (Japanese: 恐怖！アカデミーの夜)	Takeyuki Sadohara	Kenjin Sata	Tomoko Iwasaki	September 24, 2022
39	"Swordmaster Kappei"; Transliteration: "Oira wa Kenshi Kappei" (Japanese: オイラは剣士カッペイ)	Naoyoshi Kusaka	Yoshifumi Fukushima	Masakatsu Iijima	October 1, 2022
40	"There Goes the Pumpking"; Transliteration: "Yareike! Panpukin Daimaō" (Japanese: やれいけ！パンプキン大魔王)	Yoshihide Kuriyama	Kenji Konuta	Hiroyuki Yano	October 8, 2022
41	"Ron is Always at Your Back"; Transliteration: "Furimukeba Ron ga Iru" (Japanese: 振り向けばロンがいる)	Matsuo Asami	Shūichi Kōyama	Koji Iwai	October 15, 2022
42	"Every Vote Counts in a Crazy Election!"; Transliteration: "Kiyoki Ippyō! Jingi Naki Senkyosen" (Japanese: 清き一票！仁義なき選挙戦)	Fukutarō Hattori	Yūka Aoki	Masakatsu Iijima	October 22, 2022
43	"Banished from the WNA Academy?"; Transliteration: "Tsuihō!? WNA Akademī" (Japanese: 追放!?WNAアカデミー)	Nanako Shimazaki	Kenjin Sata	Nanako Shimazaki	October 29, 2022
44	"Poop Recruits!"; Transliteration: "Unchi Shokun!" (Japanese: うんち諸君！)	Kazuya Fujishiro	Yoshifumi Fukushima	Yukihiro Matsushita	November 5, 2022
45	"Operation Hideout Takeover!"; Transliteration: "Fūun!! Ajito Kōryakusen" (Japanese: 風雲‼アジト攻略戦)	Akitoshi Kono	Shinji Satō	Nanako Shimazaki	November 12, 2022
46	"Eagle City's New Hero – Part 1"; Transliteration: "Īguru Shiti no Nyū Hīrō Zenpen" (Japanese: イーグルシティの新英雄 前編)	Takeyuki Sadohara	Kenji Konuta	Koji Iwai	November 19, 2022
47	"Eagle City's New Hero – Part 2"; Transliteration: "Īguru Shiti no Nyū Hīrō Kōhen"	Seung Hui Son	Kenji Konuta	Masakatsu Iijima	November 26, 2022
48	"Assassin of Tenacity"; Transliteration: "Shūnen no Ansatsusha" (Japanese: 執念の暗殺者)	Nanako Shimazaki	Shūichi Kōyama	Nanako Shimazaki	December 3, 2022
49	"Meteorite Scramble Battle!"; Transliteration: "Inseki dai Sōdatsu Batoru!" (Japanese: 隕石大争奪バトル！)	Yoshihide Kuriyama	Kenjin Sata	Hiroyuki Yano	December 10, 2022
50	"Counterattack of Shadow Ninja"; Transliteration: "Shadō Ninja no Gyakushū" (Japanese: シャドーニンジャの逆襲)	Fukutarō Hattori	Yoshifumi Fukushima	Akihiro Enomoto	December 17, 2022
51	"Decisive Battle at the Opera House!"; Transliteration: "Opera-za no Kessen!" (Japanese: オペラ座の決戦！)	Kōgo Matsuzawa	Kenji Konuta	Masakatsu Iijima	December 24, 2022
52	"Ultra-Secret Void Clone Technique"; Transliteration: "Kyūkyoku Ōgi Mumyō Yami Bunshin" (Japanese: 究極奥義・無明闇分身)	Kazuya Fujishiro	Shinji Satō	Hiroyuki Yano	January 7, 2023
53	"Disbanding the WNA"; Transliteration: "WNA Kaitai Meirei!?" (Japanese: WNA解体命令!?)	Nanako Shimazaki	Yūka Aoki	Nanako Shimazaki	January 14, 2023
54	"Lucy on the Cliff"; Transliteration: "Kage no Ue no Rūshī" (Japanese: 断崖(かげ)の上のルーシー)	Takeyuki Sadohara	Shūichi Kōyama	Akihiro Enomoto	February 4, 2023
55	"Call Me Master Shadow"; Transliteration: "Wa ga Na wa Masutā Shadō" (Japanese: 我が名はマスターシャドー)	Naoyoshi Kusaka	Yoshifumi Fukushima	Tomoko Iwasaki	February 11, 2023
56	"Give Me Ninja Gum!"; Transliteration: "Gibu Mī! Ninja-Gum!" (Japanese: ギブミー！ニンジャガム！)	Fukutarō Hattori	Kenjin Sata	Tomoko Iwasaki	February 18, 2023
57	"Battle for the Academy"; Transliteration: "Akademī kōbōsen!" (Japanese: アカデミー攻防戦！)	Akiko Nakano	Kenji Konuta	Masakatsu Iijima	February 25, 2023
58	"Independent Eagle City"; Transliteration: "Īguru Shiti Dokuritsu Sengen" (Japanese: イーグルシティ独立宣言)	Michita Shiraishi	Shinji Satō	Masakatsu Iijima	March 4, 2023
59	"Showdown – Burton vs. Dan"; Transliteration: "Kettō! Bāton Bāsasu Dan" (Japanese: 決闘！バートンVSダン)	Hiroyuki Okuno	Yoshifumi Fukushima	Hiroyuki Yano	March 11, 2023
60	"A Masked Surprise"; Transliteration: "Shōgeki! Kamen no Shita no Shinjitsu" (Japanese: 衝撃！仮面の下の真実)	Kazuya Fujishiro	Kenjin Sata	Tomoko Iwasaki	March 18, 2023
61	"Attack of the Bottle Collectors"; Transliteration: "Kyūshū! Botoru Korekutāzu" (Japanese: 急襲！ボトルコレクターズ)	Ayaka Tsujihashi	Yūka Aoki	Nanako Shimazaki	March 25, 2023
62	"The WNA's Greatest Weapon"; Transliteration: "WNA! Shijō Saidai no Ninmu!" (Japanese: WNA！史上最大の忍務！)	Takeyuki Sadohara	Shūichi Kōyama	Koji Iwai	April 1, 2023
63	"Rising Devil Burton's Awakening"; Transliteration: "Kishin Shōrai! Mezame yo Bāton" (Japanese: 鬼神招来！目覚めよバートン)	Naoyoshi Kusaka	Kenji Konuta	Hiroyuki Yano	April 8, 2023
64	"A Visitor to Eagle's Island"; Transliteration: "Īguru Shiti no Raihōsha" (Japanese: イーグルシティの来訪者)	Yuki Kusakabe	Kenji Konuta	Masakatsu Iijima	April 15, 2023
65	"Pull Yourself Together, Ezet!"; Transliteration: "Dōsuru Ore!? Dōsuru Ezetto!" (Japanese: どーするオレ⁉︎どーするエゼット！)	Hideki Takeda	Kenjin Sata	Tomoko Iwasaki	April 22, 2023
66	"The Ninjala Battle Festival Begins"; Transliteration: "Kaisai! Ninjara Batoru Fesutibaru" (Japanese: 開幕！ニンジャラBF)	Ryousuke Senbo & Yūki Kakuhara	Yoshifumi Fukushima	Meigo Naito	April 29, 2023
67	"Here Comes Ezet the Thief!"; Transliteration: "Sanjō! Kaitō Ezetto" (Japanese: 参上！怪盗エゼット)	Fukutarō Hattori	Yūka Aoki	Masakatsu Iijima	May 6, 2023
68	"It's Tough Being a Leader, Van"; Transliteration: "Bān no Rīdā wa Tsurai yo" (Japanese: バーンのリーダーはつらいよ)	Kazuya Fujishiro	Shūichi Kōyama	Akihiro Enomoto	May 13, 2023
69	"Locked on Ron"; Transliteration: "Nerawareta Ron" (Japanese: 狙われたロン)	Ayaka Tsujihashi	Shinji Satō	Tetsuji Takayanagi	May 20, 2023
70	"Berecca's Special Service"; Transliteration: "Berekka no Omotenashi" (Japanese: ベレッカのオモテナシ)	Takeyuki Sadohara	Kenjin Sata	Tsukasa Sunaga	May 27, 2023
71	"Space Duo"; Transliteration: "Uchū kara kita Futarigumi" (Japanese: 宇宙から来た二人組)	Yuki Kusakabe	Yoshifumi Fukushima	Hiroyuki Yano	June 3, 2023
72	"Trust Your Friends and Take the Win"; Transliteration: "Nakama wo Shinjite Shōri wo Tsukame!" (Japanese: 仲間を信じて勝利をつかめ！)	Yuki Kusakabe	Shūichi Kōyama	Masakatsu Iijima	June 10, 2023
73	"Ezet's Mission"; Transliteration: "Ezetto no Shimei" (Japanese: エゼットの使命)	Hideki Takeda	Kenji Konuta	Tetsuji Takayanagi	June 17, 2023
74	"Kidnapping Berecca"; Transliteration: "Sarawareta Berekka!" (Japanese: さらわれたベレッカ！)	Yūki Kakuhara	Yūka Aoki	Tsukasa Sunaga	June 24, 2023
75	"Welcome to the WNA Academy"; Transliteration: "Yōkoso! WNA Akademī" (Japanese: ようこそ！WNAアカデミー)	Fukutarō Hattori	Shinji Satō	Hiroyuki Yano	July 1, 2023
76	"Operation Spaceship Repair"; Transliteration: "Uchūsen Fukkatsu dai Sakusen" (Japanese: 宇宙船復活大作戦)	Ayaka Tsujihashi	Yoshifumi Fukushima	Ayaka Tsujihashi	July 8, 2023
77	"Fishing for the Stars"; Transliteration: "Uchū wo Mezashite Fisshingu!" (Japanese: 宇宙を目指してフィッシング！)	Kazuya Fujishiro	Kenjin Sata	Masakatsu Iijima	July 15, 2023
78	"An Eleventh Member?!"; Transliteration: "Jūichinin...iru!?" (Japanese: 11人...いる!?)	Naoyoshi Kusaka	Shūichi Kōyama	Tetsuji Takayanagi	July 22, 2023
79	"The Cat, the Crow & the Master"; Transliteration: "Neko to Karasu to Genryūsai to" (Japanese: 猫とカラスと源柳斎と)	Ryousuke Senbo & Yūki Kakuhara	Kenji Konuta	Nanako Shimazaki	July 29, 2023
80	"Settlekettle Test of Mettle"; Transliteration: "Fundorukettoru Kiki Ippatsu" (Japanese: フンドルケットル危機一髪)	Takeyuki Sadohara	Yūka Aoki	Tsukasa Sunaga	August 5, 2023
81	"Meluz at Last"; Transliteration: "Harubaru Kitaze Meruusu-sei" (Japanese: はるばる来たぜメルウス星)	Akira Shimizu	Kenji Konuta	Masakatsu Iijima	August 12, 2023
82	"Mission 1: Food Surveillance"; Transliteration: "Hatsu Ninmu wa Gurume Teisatsu" (Japanese: 初忍務はグルメ偵察)	Hideki Takeda	Yoshifumi Fukushima	Tomoko Iwasaki	August 19, 2023
83	"Oasis Recovery"; Transliteration: "Oashisu wo Dakkan Seyo" (Japanese: オアシスを奪還せよ)	Masaki Arai & Yoshitaka Koyama	Shinji Satō	Tsukasa Sunaga	August 26, 2023
84	"Twilight at the Ancient Ruins"; Transliteration: "Iseki no Himitsu wa Yoru Hiraku" (Japanese: 遺跡の秘密は夜ひらく)	Sōta Shiro	Kenjin Sata	Tomoko Iwasaki	September 2, 2023
85	"Cathedral Clash"; Transliteration: "Gekitō! Mezase Daiseidō" (Japanese: 激闘！目指せ大聖堂)	Fukutarō Hattori	Shūichi Kōyama	Nanako Shimazaki	September 9, 2023
86	"Charge of the Gumdiva"; Transliteration: "Shōgeki! Gamugozen" (Japanese: 襲撃！ガムゴゼン)	Naoyoshi Kusaka	Kenji Konuta	Hiroyuki Yano	September 16, 2023
87	"Taking Back Meluz"; Transliteration: "Meruusu-sei wo Torimodose!" (Japanese: メルウス星を取り戻せ！)	Yuki Kusakabe	Yūka Aoki	Tsukasa Sunaga	September 23, 2023
88	"Crazy Election – Part 2"; Transliteration: "Jingi Naki Senkyosen Pāto Tsū" (Japanese: 仁義なき選挙戦 パート2)	Kazuya Fujishiro	Yoshifumi Fukushima	Akihiro Enomoto	September 30, 2023
89	"Desert Isle Treasure Hunt"; Transliteration: "Mujintō de Torejā Hanto" (Japanese: 無人島でトレジャーハント)	Akira Shimizu	Shinji Satō	Masakatsu Iijima	October 7, 2023
90	"I'm a Ninja, You're a Ninja"; Transliteration: "Ninja Chigatte, Ninja ii" (Japanese: ニンジャちがって、ニンジャいい)	Takeyuki Sadohara	Kenjin Sata	Tetsuji Takayanagi	October 14, 2023
91	"Run, Kappei! Genunsai is Missing!"; Transliteration: "Hashire Kappei! Kieta Genunsai" (Japanese: 走れカッペイ！消えた源雲斎)	Kodai Mamasa	Shūichi Kōyama	Hiroyuki Yano	October 21, 2023
92	"Lucy and the Teddy Gang"; Transliteration: "Rūshī to Kuma-chan Gyangu dan" (Japanese: ルーシーと熊ちゃんギャング団)	Naoyoshi Kusaka	Kenji Konuta	Tsukasa Sunaga	October 28, 2023
93	"Secrets of Femme Spy Jane"; Transliteration: "Onna Supai Jēn no Himitsu" (Japanese: 女スパイ ジェーンの秘密)	Hideki Takeda	Yoshifumi Fukushima	Akihiro Enomoto	November 4, 2023
94	"Close Encounters of the Gumchi Kind"; Transliteration: "Gamucchi to no Sougū" (Japanese: 女スパイ ジェーンの秘密)	Sōta Shiro	Shūichi Kōyama	Masakatsu Iijima	November 11, 2023
95	"The Melancholy of Warren"; Transliteration: "Wōren no Yūutsu" (Japanese: ウォーレンの憂鬱)	Fukutarō Hattori	Kenjin Sata	Nanako Shimazaki	November 18, 2023
96	"Burton the Inventor"; Transliteration: "Hatsumeika Bāton" (Japanese: 発明家バートン)	Akira Shimizu	Yoshifumi Fukushima	Tsukasa Sunaga	November 25, 2023
97	"Swift and Fierce – Academy Sports Day"; Transliteration: "Fūrinkazan! Akademī dai Undōkai" (Japanese: 風林火山！アカデミー大運動会)	Naoyoshi Kusaka	Shinji Satō	Masakatsu Iijima	December 2, 2023
98	"The Case Files of Detective Berecca"; Transliteration: "Meitantei Berekka no Shigenbo" (Japanese: 名探偵ベレッカの事件簿)	Kazuya Fujishiro	Kenji Konuta	Tetsuji Takayanagi	December 9, 2023
99	"Goodbye Daisy?"; Transliteration: "Sayonara? Deijī-sensei" (Japanese: さよなら？デイジー先生)	Yuki Kusakabe	Yūka Aoki	Akihiro Enomoto	December 16, 2023
100	"Kappei's Special Delivery"; Transliteration: "Kappei, Wani wo Ukeru" (Japanese: カッペイ、ワニを届ける)	Takeyuki Sadohara	Yoshifumi Fukushima	Tsukasa Sunaga	December 23, 2023
101	"A Willful Princess's Escort"; Transliteration: "Wagamama Ōjo wo Esukōto" (Japanese: わがまま王女をエスコート)	Naoyoshi Kusaka	Shūichi Kōyama	Hiroyuki Yano	January 20, 2024
102	"I'm You, You're Me"; Transliteration: "Ore ga Atai de Oira ga Mī de" (Japanese: オレがアタイでオイラがミーで)	Ryousuke Senbo	Kenjin Sata	Masakatsu Iijima	January 27, 2024
103	"Van and the Mermaid at Dawn"; Transliteration: "Bān to Yoake no Māmeido" (Japanese: バーンと夜明けのマーメイド)	Rokusuke Okimitsu	Kenji Konuta	Tetsuji Takayanagi	February 3, 2024
104	"Ninjas Go Viral"; Transliteration: "Ninja Dōga o Bazu-ra Sero!" (Japanese: ニンジャ動画をバズらせろ！)	Fukutarō Hattori	Shinji Satō	Tsukasa Sunaga	February 10, 2024
105	"Goro's Longest Day"; Transliteration: "Gorō no Nagai Ichinichi" (Japanese: ゴローの長い一日)	Sōta Shiro	Yūka Aoki	Akihiro Enomoto	February 17, 2024
106	"Lucy and Her Friends"; Transliteration: "Rūshī no Futari wa Tomodachi" (Japanese: ルーシーのふたりはともだち)	Kazuya Fujishiro	Yoshifumi Fukushima	Masakatsu Iijima	February 24, 2024
107	"Revenge of the Skull Ninja"; Transliteration: "Fukushū no Sukaru Ninja" (Japanese: 復讐のスカルニンジャ)	Kodai Mamasa	Shūichi Kōyama	Tetsuji Takayanagi	March 2, 2024
108	"Keith the Solitary Gourmet"; Transliteration: "Kīsu no Kodokuna Gurume?" (Japanese: キースの孤独なグルメ？)	Yuki Kusakabe	Kenjin Sata	Hiroyuki Yano	March 9, 2024
109	"Messenger From the Future"; Transliteration: "Mirai kara no Shisha" (Japanese: 未来からの使者)	Takeyuki Sadohara	Yoshifumi Fukushima	Akihiro Enomoto	March 16, 2024
110	"Tyler and His Father's Farm"; Transliteration: "Tairā to Oyaji no Hatake" (Japanese: タイラーと親父の畑)	Fumio Itō	Yūka Aoki	Tsukasa Sunaga	March 23, 2024
111	"Come On Baby Academy"; Transliteration: "Kamon Beibī Akademī" (Japanese: カモンベイビーアカデミー)	Akira Shimizu	Shinji Satō	Masakatsu Iijima	March 30, 2024
112	"Grand Cedar Tree of Shinobi City"; Transliteration: "Shinobi no Sato no Sen'nen Sugi" (Japanese: シノビの里の千年杉)	Hideki Takeda	Kenji Konuta	Tetsuji Takayanagi	April 6, 2024
113	"The Kids Who Leapt Through Time"; Transliteration: "Toki wo Kakeru Shōnen Shōjo!?" (Japanese: 時をかける少年少女!?)	Fukutarō Hattori	Kenji Konuta	Hiroyuki Yano	April 13, 2024
114	"Vanji the Guardian & the Rice Riot"; Transliteration: "Kome Sōdō da! Idaten no Banji!" (Japanese: 米騒動だ！韋駄天の伴二！)	Ryousuke Senbo	Shūichi Kōyama	Tsukasa Sunaga	April 20, 2024
115	"Clairvoyant Oema & the Kappa Attack"; Transliteration: "Kappa Shūrai! Shinrigan no Oema" (Japanese: 河童襲来！千里眼のお絵馬)	Kazuya Fujishiro	Natsumi Morichi	Akihiro Enomoto	April 27, 2024
116	"Rampage of Olu the Strong"; Transliteration: "Ōabare! Senninriki no Orū" (Japanese: 大あばれ！千人力のおる卯)	Kodai Mamasa	Kenjin Sata	Masakatsu Iijima	May 4, 2024
117	"Light of Life in the Night"; Transliteration: "Yoru ni Tomoru Inochi no Tomoshibi" (Japanese: 夜にともる命の灯火)	Sōta Shiro	Yoshifumi Fukushima	Tsukasa Sunaga	May 11, 2024
118	"Kunoichi Jien & the Dust Devil"; Transliteration: "Kamaitachi ga Kiru! Kunoichi no Jien" (Japanese: 鎌鼬が斬る！くノ一の慈艶)	Fumio Itō	Kenji Konuta	Takeshi Mori	May 18, 2024
119	"Kunoichi Jien & the Dust Devil"; Transliteration: "Rekka no Kippei! Ayakashi no Yakata" (Japanese: 烈火の吉平！妖かしの館)	Takeyuki Sadohara	Shūichi Kōyama	Akihiro Enomoto	May 25, 2024
120	"Samurai Training With Master Kozaru?!"; Transliteration: "Samurai Shugyou! Kozaru ni Deshiiri?" (Japanese: 侍修行！ コザルに弟子入り？)	Yuki Kusakabe	Natsumi Morichi	Hiroyuki Yano	June 1, 2024
121	"Serpent of the Bottomless Swamp"; Transliteration: "Soko Nashi Numa no Shirohebi Densetsu" (Japanese: 底なし沼の白蛇伝説)	Hideki Takeda	Shinji Satō	Tsukasa Sunaga	June 8, 2024
122	"The Swordsman & the Soaring Specter"; Transliteration: "Kirisute Gomen? Ittan Momen!" (Japanese: 切捨御免? 一反木綿!)	Fumio Itō	Yūka Aoki	Takeshi Mori	June 15, 2024
123	"One-Inch Oema and the Magic Mallet"; Transliteration: "Issun Oema to Uchide no Kodzuchi" (Japanese: 一寸お絵馬と打出の小槌)	Ryousuke Senbo & Saaki Kudo	Kenjin Sata	Tetsuji Takayanagi	June 22, 2024
124	"Warring States Ninjala Battle?!"; Transliteration: "Sengoku no Ninjara Batoru!?" (Japanese: 戦国のニンジャラバトル！？)	Kazuya Fujishiro	Kenji Konuta	Masakatsu Iijima	June 29, 2024
125	"From the Cafeteria with Love"; Transliteration: "Shokudou yori Ai o Komete" (Japanese: 食堂より愛をこめて)	Naohito Takahashi	Yoshifumi Fukushima	Akihiro Enomoto	July 6, 2024
126	"Big Boss Battle"; Transliteration: "Tsuigeki! Gamunyuudou" (Japanese: 追撃！ガムニュウドウ)	Akira Shimizu	Shūichi Kōyama	Tsukasa Sunaga	July 13, 2024
127	"The Search for Gumchi"; Transliteration: "Gamucchi o Sagase!" (Japanese: ガムッチを探せ！)	Fumio Itō	Shinji Satō	Hiroyuki Yano	July 20, 2024
128	"Three Umbrellas & A Rescue Mission"; Transliteration: "Karakasa Sankyōdai! Gamutchi Kyūshutsu Sakusen!" (Japanese: から傘三兄弟！ガムッチ救出作戦！)	Tomio Yamauchi	Natsumi Morichi	Takeshi Mori	July 27, 2024
129	"Ronzaburo on the Battlefield"; Transliteration: "Ikusaba no Ronzaburō" (Japanese: 戦場の論三郎)	Sōta Shiro	Kenjin Sata	Masakatsu Iijima	August 3, 2024
130	"Thunderclap at the Great Cedar Battle"; Transliteration: "Hibike Raimei! Sennen Sugi no Kessen" (Japanese: 響け雷鳴! 千年杉の決戦)	Hideki Takeda & Nanako Shimazaki	Kenji Konuta	Tsukasa Sunaga	August 10, 2024
131	"Steamy Confrontation with Oedo's Monkeys"; Transliteration: "Yukemuri Kassen! Oedo Saru Gundan" (Japanese: 湯けむり合戦! オエド猿軍団)	Fumio Itō	Yoshifumi Fukushima	Akihiro Enomoto	August 17, 2024
132	"Sudden Love Letter – Pull Yourself Together, Ezet!"; Transliteration: "Koibumi wa Totsuzen ni!? Dōsuru Ezetto!" (Japanese: 恋文は突然に！？どーするエゼット！)	Konomi Tezuka & Saaki Kudo & Ryousuke Senbo	Shūichi Kōyama	Kentarō Fujita	August 24, 2024
133	"Ninja Training? Dan's Got Work!"; Transliteration: "Ninja Shugyō? Dan wa Gujjobu!" (Japanese: 忍者修行? ダンはグッジョブ!)	Kazuya Fujishiro	Kenjin Sata	Takeshi Mori	August 31, 2024
134	"Bottle Collector Breakup?"; Transliteration: "Kaisan Kiki!? Botoru Korekutāzu" (Japanese: 解散危機！？ボトルコレクターズ)	Fukutarō Hattori	Kenji Konuta	Hiroyuki Yano	September 7, 2024
135	"Keith's Treasure"; Transliteration: "Kīsu no Takaramono" (Japanese: キースの宝物)	Yuki Kusakabe	Yūka Aoki	Tsukasa Sunaga	September 14, 2024
136	"Naomi Returns Home"; Transliteration: "Naomi Furusato ni Kaeru" (Japanese: ナオミ故郷に帰る)	Fumio Itō	Natsumi Morichi	Masakatsu Iijima	September 21, 2024
137	"Nothing but Enemies?"; Transliteration: "Jibun Igai, Zen'in Teki!?" (Japanese: 自分以外, 全員敵!?)	Won-Hoe Kim	Shinji Satō	Akihiro Enomoto	September 28, 2024
138	"Gumchi Dollee!"; Transliteration: "Gamucchi! Nuigurumicchi!?" (Japanese: ガムッチ! ヌイグルミッチ!?)	Konomi Tezuka	Yoshifumi Fukushima	Takeshi Mori	October 5, 2024
139	"Ninja of the Dead"; Transliteration: "Ninja Obu za Deddo" (Japanese: ニンジャ・オブ・ザ・デッド)	Rokusuke Okimitsu	Kenjin Sata	Hiroyuki Yano	October 12, 2024
140	"Taking Down Burton – The New Inventor"; Transliteration: "Datō Bāton! Hatsumei-ō wa Watashi yo!" (Japanese: 打倒バートン！発明王は私よ！)	Fumio Itō	Shūichi Kōyama	Tsukasa Sunaga	October 19, 2024
141	"Fireworks in the Night Sky"; Transliteration: "Hanabi ga Hiraku Yozora ni" (Japanese: 花火が開く夜空に)	Masashi Tsukino	Kenji Konuta	Takeshi Mori	October 26, 2024
142	"Van and the Mysterious Tome"; Transliteration: "Bān to Nazo no Komonjo" (Japanese: バーンと謎の古文書)	Kazuya Fujishiro	Yūka Aoki	Masakatsu Iijima	November 2, 2024
143	"When it Snows in Eagle City"; Transliteration: "Īgurushiti ni Yuki ga Tsumoreba" (Japanese: イーグルシティに雪が積もれば)	Sōta Shiro	Yoshifumi Fukushima	Akihiro Enomoto	November 9, 2024
144	"No Laughs From Bruce"; Transliteration: "Bruce wa Warawanai" (Japanese: ブルースは笑わない)	Fukutarō Hattori	Shinji Satō	Takeshi Mori	November 16, 2024
145	"Test Season at the Academy"; Transliteration: "Toppa! Akademī Gakuryoku Tesuto" (Japanese: 突破！アカデミー学力テスト)	Fumio Itō	Natsumi Morichi	Tetsuji Takayanagi	November 23, 2024
146	"Bye-bye Gumchi?"; Transliteration: "Sayonara?? Gamucchi" (Japanese: さよなら？？ガムッチ)	Chiyo Suzuki	Kenjin Sata	Tsukasa Sunaga	November 30, 2024
147	"Across the Sea of Stars"; Transliteration: "Hoshi no Umi o Koete" (Japanese: 星の海を越えて)	Akira Shimizu	Shūichi Kōyama	Takeshi Mori	December 7, 2024
148	"Kappei's Training Journey"; Transliteration: "Iza! Kappei no Musha Shugyō" (Japanese: いざ！カッペイの武者修行)	Rokusuke Okimitsu	Kenji Konuta	Yūzō Satō	December 14, 2024
149	"A Cat Eat Cat World"; Transliteration: "Tafu de Nyakute wa Ikite Ikenyai" (Japanese: タフでニャくては生きていけニャい)	Won-Hoe Kim	Yoshifumi Fukushima	Hiroyuki Yano	December 21, 2024
150	"Allez! Iron Chef-in-Training"; Transliteration: "Are! Chōri Jisshū no Tetsujin" (Japanese: アレ! 調理実習の鉄人)	Fumio Itō	Shinji Satō	Akihiro Enomoto	January 18, 2025
151	"Class With Flora!"; Transliteration: "Shin'nin Kyōshi Furōra de Gozaimasu!" (Japanese: 新任教師フローラでございます！)	Masashi Tsukino	Natsumi Morichi	Takeshi Mori	January 25, 2025
152	"Monsters Attack"; Transliteration: "Monsutāzu Atakku!" (Japanese: モンスターズアタック！)	Kazuya Fujishiro	Kenjin Sata	Tsukasa Sunaga	February 1, 2025
153	"Lucy Through the Looking Glass"; Transliteration: "Kagami no Kuni no Rūshī" (Japanese: 鏡の国のルーシー)	Takeyuki Sadohara	Shūichi Kōyama	Masakatsu Iijima	February 8, 2025
154	"New Shadows Fall"; Transliteration: "Ugokidasu Aratana Kage" (Japanese: 動き出す新たな影)	Fukutarō Hattori	Kenji Konuta	Hiroyuki Yano	February 15, 2025
155	"Call Me Mistress Shade"; Transliteration: "Waga Na wa Masutā Redi" (Japanese: 我が名はマスターレディ)	Fumio Itō	Kenji Konuta	Tsukasa Sunaga	February 22, 2025
156	"Sink that Winning Dunk, Van!"; Transliteration: "Kimero Bān! Shōri no Danku" (Japanese: 決めろバーン！勝利のダンク)	Ken Kiyota	Yoshifumi Fukushima	Takeshi Mori	March 1, 2025
157	"Laugh and Peace"; Transliteration: "Gyagu & Pīsu" (Japanese: ギャグ&ピース)	Hideki Takeda	Kenjin Sata	Yūzō Satō	March 8, 2025
158	"Follow the Lights"; Transliteration: "Nazo no Kirakira o Oe!" (Japanese: 謎のキラキラを追え！)	Sōta Shiro	Yūka Aoki	Takeshi Mori	March 15, 2025
159	"Beware of the Drink Thief"; Transliteration: "Dorinku Dorobō ni Goyōjin" (Japanese: ドリンク泥棒にご用心)	Won-Hoe Kim	Shinji Satō	Akihiro Enomoto	March 22, 2025
160	"False Advertisements"; Transliteration: "Kanban wa Itsuwari Ari" (Japanese: 看板は偽りあり)	Fumio Itō	Natsumi Morichi	Masakatsu Iijima	March 29, 2025
161	"Trouble in the Mist"; Transliteration: "Konran wa Kiri no Kanata ni" (Japanese: 混乱は霧のかなたに)	Masashi Tsukino	Shūichi Kōyama	Tsukasa Sunaga	April 5, 2025
162	"The Unsealer"; Transliteration: "Fūin o Toka Reshi Mono" (Japanese: 封印を解かれしもの)	Kazuya Fujishiro	Kenji Konuta	Takeshi Mori	April 12, 2025
163	"New Target"; Transliteration: "Nerawareta Kirifuda!" (Japanese: 狙われた切り札！)	Akira Shimizu	Yoshifumi Fukushima	Hiroyuki Yano	April 19, 2025
164	"New Nightmare"; Transliteration: "Akumu no Hajimari" (Japanese: 悪夢の始まり)	Fukutarō Hattori	Kenjin Sata	Takeshi Mori	April 26, 2025
165	"Great Power—Berecca's Decision"; Transliteration: "Ōinaru Chikara! Berekka no Sentaku" (Japanese: 大いなる力！ベレッカの選択)	Fumio Itō	Yūka Aoki	Yūzō Satō & Nanako Shimazaki	May 3, 2025
166	"WNA Icebreaker"; Transliteration: "WNA/Aisubureiku!?" (Japanese: WNA/アイスブレイク!?)	Rokusuke Okimitsu	Shinji Satō	Tsukasa Sunaga	May 10, 2025
167	"Sky Splitter—Koga Ninpo Soaring Strike!"; Transliteration: "Sora o Sake! Kōga Ninpō Hishōgiri" (Japanese: 空を裂け！甲賀忍法・飛翔斬り)	Ken Kiyota	Natsumi Morichi	Masakatsu Iijima	May 17, 2025
168	"Wrap Things Up, Kappei"; Transliteration: "Kappei, Hōtai, Tsukai Hōdai!" (Japanese: カッペイ、ホータイ、使いほーだい！)	Takeyuki Sadohara	Shūichi Kōyama	Hiroyuki Yano	May 24, 2025
169	"Lucy Dances in Darkness"; Transliteration: "Higi Denshō! Rūshī Yami ni Mau!" (Japanese: 秘技伝承！ルーシー闇に舞う！)	Won-Hoe Kim	Yoshifumi Fukushima	Akihiro Enomoto	May 31, 2025
170	"Ron, Jane, and the Fight for Tomorrow"; Transliteration: "Ron & Jēn Ashita ni Mukatte Ute!" (Japanese: ロン&ジェーン 明日に向かってうて！)	Fumio Itō	Kenjin Sata	Nanako Shimazaki	June 7, 2025
171	"Tracking Down Flora's Secrets"; Transliteration: "Tsuiseki Seyo! Furōra Sensei no Himitsu" (Japanese: 追跡せよ！フローラ先生の秘密)	Naoki Takada	Yūka Aoki	Takeshi Mori	June 14, 2025
172	"Showdown! Burton VS Mistress Shade!"; Transliteration: "Taiketsu! Bāton vs Masutā Redi" (Japanese: 対決！バートンvsマスターレディ)	Kazuya Fujishiro	Shinji Satō	Tsukasa Sunaga	June 21, 2025
173	"WNA's Darkest Day"; Transliteration: "Kaimetsu! WNA Saidai no Kiki" (Japanese: 壊滅！WNA最大の危機)	Sōta Shiro	Shūichi Kōyama	Takeshi Mori	June 28, 2025
174	"Fated Encounter"; Transliteration: "Meguriau Unmei no Futari" (Japanese: めぐりあう運命の二人)	Rokusuke Okimitsu	Natsumi Morichi	Hiroyuki Yano	July 5, 2025
175	"Battle with Gumonk – Emma Strikes Back"; Transliteration: "Gamunyuudou o Yamero! Hangeki no Ema" (Japanese: ガムニュウドウを止めろ！反撃のエマ)	Fumio Itō	Kenji Konuta	Masakatsu Iijima	July 12, 2025
176	"Together as One Till the End"; Transliteration: "Kokoro Hitotsu ni Ketchaku no Toki" (Japanese: 心ひとつに 決着の時)	Fukutarō Hattori	Kenji Konuta	Tsukasa Sunaga	July 19, 2025
177	"Heat Wave – Trouble at the Academy"; Transliteration: "Gokusho! Akademī Saidai no Kiki" (Japanese: 極暑！アカデミー最大の危機)	Ken Kiyota	Yoshifumi Fukushima	Takeshi Mori	July 26, 2025
178	"The Great Escape Race"; Transliteration: "Hakunetsu! Mujintō Dasshutsu Rēsu" (Japanese: 白熱！無人島脱出レース)	Akira Shimizu	Kenjin Sata	Akihiro Enomoto	August 2, 2025
179	"The Phantom Thief Comes Calling"; Transliteration: "Nozome! Kaitō X kara no Yokoku-jō" (Japanese: 挑め！怪盗Xからの予告状)	Ryōtarō Honda	Shūichi Kōyama	Takeshi Mori	August 9, 2025
180	"Summer Frights! Haunted Van!"; Transliteration: "Manatsu no Zekkyō Hōnteddo Vān" (Japanese: 真夏の絶恐ホーンテッドバーン)	Fumio Itō	Shinji Satō	Toshiyuki Kashiyama	August 16, 2025
181	"Two As One – Cutie Strawberry"; Transliteration: "Futari wa Kyūtī Sutoroberī" (Japanese: ふたりはキューティー・ストロベリー)	Naoki Yamamoto	Natsumi Morichi	Tsukasa Sunaga	August 23, 2025
182	"Black Rose – Legendary Kunoichi"; Transliteration: "Kuroki Bara! Densetsu no Kunoichi" (Japanese: 黒き薔薇！伝説のくノ一)	Rokusuke Okimitsu	Yoshifumi Fukushima	Hiroyuki Yano	August 30, 2025
183	"Our Tuna Tale"; Transliteration: "Maguro ni Kakeru Atai-tachi" (Japanese: マグロに賭けるアタイたち)	Takeyuki Sadohara	Kōji Bandai	Takeshi Mori	September 6, 2025
184	"Gumshoe Gumchi On the Scene"; Transliteration: "Gamuutsu to Kaiketsu!? Meitantei Gamutchi" (Japanese: ガムッと解決!?迷探偵ガムッチ)	Kazuya Fujishiro	Kenjin Sata	Toshiyuki Kashiyama	September 13, 2025
185	"Gumball Machine Clash"; Transliteration: "Gekitotsu! Batoru wa Gamu Gacha Shidai" (Japanese: 激突！バトルはガムガチャしだい)	Fumio Itō	Kenji Konuta	Akihiro Enomoto	September 20, 2025
186	"Strike With the Mind's Eye"; Transliteration: "Hirake Shingan! Kehai Kiri Gassen" (Japanese: 開け心眼！気配斬り合戦)	Fukutarō Hattori	Natsumi Morichi	Masakatsu Iijima	September 27, 2025
187	"Getting Pooped!"; Transliteration: "Teki o Unchi ni Seyo!" (Japanese: 敵をうんちにせよ！)	Ken Kiyota	Shūichi Kōyama	Tsukasa Sunaga	October 4, 2025
188	"Final Free For All"; Transliteration: "Nandemo Ari no Kesshōsen!?" (Japanese: なんでもありの決勝戦！？)	Sōta Shiro	Kenji Konuta	Hiroyuki Yano	October 11, 2025
189	"Prized Competition"; Transliteration: "Yūshō Shōhin wa Sōdatsu-sen?" (Japanese: 優勝賞品は争奪戦？)	Ryōtarō Honda	Kōji Bandai	Takeshi Mori	October 18, 2025
190	"Bye-bye Lucy"; Transliteration: "Sayonara??? Rūshī" (Japanese: さよなら？？？ルーシー)	Fumio Itō	Yoshifumi Fukushima	Masakatsu Iijima	October 25, 2025
191	"Outsmarting Jane"; Transliteration: "Neesan o Gyafun to Iwa Setai!" (Japanese: ねえさんをギャフンと言わせたい！)	Hideki Takeda	Shinji Satō	Takeshi Mori	November 1, 2025
192	"Amy and the Kitty Kingdom"; Transliteration: "Eimī-sensei to Neko no Ōkoku" (Japanese: エイミー先生と猫の王国)	Naoki Yamamoto	Kenjin Sata	Tsukasa Sunaga	November 8, 2025
193	"Fight for Liberty Park"; Transliteration: "Ribati Pāku wa Dare no Mono?" (Japanese: リバティパークは誰のもの？)	Akira Shimizu	Natsumi Morichi	Toshiyuki Kashiyama	November 15, 2025
194	"The Day the Kuroko Stopped"; Transliteration: "Kuroko ga Seishishita-bi" (Japanese: 黒子が静止した日)	Kazuya Fujishiro	Kōji Bandai	Hiroyuki Yano	November 22, 2025
195	"Kappei the Invisible Ninja"; Transliteration: "Tōmei Ninja Kappei" (Japanese: 透明ニンジャカッペイ)	Fumio Itō	Shūichi Kōyama	Takeshi Mori	November 29, 2025
196	"Lucy the Artist"; Transliteration: "Rūshī Gaka ni Naru" (Japanese: ルーシー画家になる)	Fukutarō Hattori	Yoshifumi Fukushima	Akihiro Enomoto	December 6, 2025
197	"Behold the Academy Theater!"; Transliteration: "Kaien!? Akademī Engeki-sai" (Japanese: 怪演！？アカデミー演劇祭)	Ken Kiyota	Kenjin Sata	Tsukasa Sunaga	December 13, 2025
198	"Berecca's Holiday Dreams"; Transliteration: "Berekka no Yumemiru Horidei" (Japanese: ベレッカの夢見るホリデイ)	Takeyuki Sadohara	Natsumi Morichi	Masakatsu Iijima	December 20, 2025
199	"Brain Game – The Brutra Quiz"; Transliteration: "Zunō de Gyakuten! Burutora Kuizu!" (Japanese: 頭脳で逆転！ブルトラクイズ！)	Ryōtarō Honda	Kenjin Sata	Takeshi Mori	December 27, 2025
200	"Burton Leaves the Academy"; Transliteration: "Bāton, Akademī Yame Tatte" (Japanese: バートン、アカデミーやめたって)	Fumio Itō	Yoshifumi Fukushima	Hiroyuki Yano	January 24, 2026
201	"Farewell, Dear Guardian"; Transliteration: "Saraba Aishi no Gādian" (Japanese: さらば愛しのガーディアン)	Hideki Takeda	Shūichi Kōyama	Takeshi Mori	January 31, 2026
202	"Detestable Vegetables"; Transliteration: "Araburu Toraburu Bejitaburu" (Japanese: 荒ぶるトラブルベジタブル)	Naoki Yamamoto	Kōji Bandai	Tsukasa Sunaga	February 7, 2026
203	"Big Cheese Kappei"; Transliteration: "Kappei, Shachō ni Naru" (Japanese: カッペイ、社長になる)	Sōta Shiro	Kenji Konuta	Akihiro Enomoto	February 14, 2026
204	"Berecca's Unlucky Day"; Transliteration: "Berekka wa Anrakkī Dei?" (Japanese: ベレッカはアンラッキーデイ？)	Kazuya Fujishiro	Kenjin Sata	Takeshi Mori	February 21, 2026
205	"Lucy and the Secret Egg"; Transliteration: "Rūshī to Himitsu no Tamago" (Japanese: ルーシーと秘密のたまご)	Fumio Itō	Natsumi Morichi	Toshiyuki Kashiyama	February 28, 2026
206	"Agent of the Fog"; Transliteration: "Kiri no Miyako no Ējento" (Japanese: 霧の都のエージェント)	Ken Kiyota	Shinji Satō	Masakatsu Iijima	March 7, 2026
207	"Uninvited Guests"; Transliteration: "Maneka Rezaru Raihō-sha" (Japanese: 招かれざる来訪者)	Fukutarō Hattori	Yoshifumi Fukushima	Tsukasa Sunaga	March 14, 2026
208	"All in Bruce's Neighborhood"; Transliteration: "Burūsu to Ayashī Rinjin-tachi" (Japanese: ブルースと怪しい隣人たち)	Akira Shimizu	Shūichi Kōyama	Takeshi Mori	March 21, 2026
209	"Gum-pei & Kap-chi"; Transliteration: "Gamutchi, Kappeitchi!?" (Japanese: ガムッチ、カッペイッチ！？)	Sōta Kōno	Kōji Bandai	Toshiyuki Kashiyama	March 28, 2026
210	"Great Excavations – Treasure of Oedo"; Transliteration: "Dai Hakkutsu! Oedo Maizō-kin Densetsu" (Japanese: 大発掘！オエド埋蔵金伝説)	Fumio Itō	Natsumi Morichi	Takeshi Mori	April 4, 2026
211	"Van's Holiday – Mission: Dad?"; Transliteration: "Bān no Kyūjitsu Oyako de Ninmu?" (Japanese: バーンの休日 親子で忍務？)	Hideki Takeda	Kenjin Sata	Masakatsu Iijima	April 11, 2026
212	"Mom in the Big City"; Transliteration: "Īguru Shiti da yo, Okkā-san" (Japanese: イーグルシティだヨ、おっ母さん)	Naoki Yamamoto & Hibiki Takazoe	Shinji Satō	Tsukasa Sunaga	April 18, 2026
213	"Burton and the Toy Factory"; Transliteration: "Bāton to Omocha Kōjō" (Japanese: バートンとオモチャ工場)	Takeyuki Sadohara	Yoshifumi Fukushima	Takeshi Mori	April 25, 2026
214	"The Abominable Snowman?!"; Transliteration: "Kaiki Yuki-otoko!?" (Japanese: 怪奇雪男！？)	Kazuya Fujishiro	Kōji Bandai	Toshiyuki Kashiyama	May 2, 2026
215	"Rock Star Tragedy"; Transliteration: "Rokku Sutā no Higeki" (Japanese: ロックスターの悲劇)	Fumio Itō	Natsumi Morichi	Akihiro Enomoto	May 9, 2026
216	"The Kuroko Rebellion"; Transliteration: "Kuroko no Hanran!? Isoge Jēn" (Japanese: 黒子の反乱！？急げジェーン)	Ken Kiyota	Shūichi Kōyama	Tsukasa Sunaga	May 16, 2026
217	"The Ancient Civilization of Coshapt"; Transliteration: "Kodaibunmei no Kuni Koshaputo e" (Japanese: 古代文明の国コシャプトへ)	Fukutarō Hattori	Kenji Konuta	Takeshi Mori	May 23, 2026
218	"Mysteries of the Tomb & the Desert Boy"; Transliteration: "Iseki no Nazo to Sabaku no Shōnen" (Japanese: 遺跡の謎と砂漠の少年)	Sōta Shiro	Kenjin Sata	Masakatsu Iijima	May 30, 2026
219	"Prince of Light & the Genie of Legend"; Transliteration: "Hikari no Ōji to Densetsu no Majin" (Japanese: 光の皇子と伝説の魔人)	Masahito Otani	Yoshifumi Fukushima	Toshiyuki Kashiyama	June 6, 2026
220	"Defense of Coshapt's Treasure"; Transliteration: "Mamore! Koshaputo no Takara" (Japanese: 守れ！コシャプトの宝)	Fumio Itō	Kōji Bandai	Tsukasa Sunaga	June 13, 2026
221	"Breaking Out of the Devil's Triangle"; Transliteration: "Nukedase! Ma no Kaiiki" (Japanese: 抜け出せ！魔の海域)	Takeyuki Sadohara	Shinji Satō	Takeshi Mori	June 20, 2026
222	"Big Changes for May"; Transliteration: "Mei no Imechen Ōsōdō" (Japanese: メイのイメチェン大騒動)	Hibiki Takazoe	Natsumi Morichi	Nanako Shimazaki	June 27, 2026
223	"A Gift Hidden in Mystery"; Transliteration: "Okurimono wa Nazotoki no Ato ni" (Japanese: 贈り物は謎解きのあとに)	Akira Shimizu	Kenji Konuta	Akihiro Enomoto	July 4, 2026
224	"Where's Warren?"; Transliteration: "U~ōren o Sagase!" (Japanese: ウォーレンをさがせ！)	Kazuya Fujishiro	Shūichi Kōyama	Takeshi Mori	July 11, 2026
225	"Infiltrating the Ninja Fans"; Transliteration: "Sen'nyū! Ninja Otaku no Tsudoi" (Japanese: 潜入！ニンジャオタクの集い)	Fumio Itō	Kōji Bandai	Takeshi Mori	July 18, 2026
226	"Comeback Fists"; Transliteration: "Ken ni Kaketa Kamubakku" (Japanese: 拳にかけたカムバック)	Ken Kiyota	Yoshifumi Fukushima	Takeshi Mori	July 25, 2026
227	"Academy Night of Screams"; Transliteration: "Ze~tsuosore! Akademī no Kowai Yoru" (Japanese: 絶恐！アカデミーのコワい夜)	Fukutarō Hattori	Kenjin Sata	Tsuksasa Sunaga	August 1, 2026
228	"Dragon Palace Summons"; Transliteration: "Gyogyo! Ryūgūjō e go Shōtai!?" (Japanese: ギョギョ！竜宮城へご招待！？)	Takeyuki Sadohara	Shinji Satō	Takeshi Mori	August 8, 2026
229	"Do Your Good Deed Today"; Transliteration: "Ichi ni Chiichizen no Susume" (Japanese: 一日一善のススメ)	Sōta Kōno	Natsumi Morichi	Toshiyuki Kashiyama	August 15, 2026
230	"Berecca Turns Catty"; Transliteration: "Nyanto! Berekka Neko ni Naru!" (Japanese: ニャンと！ベレッカ猫になる！)	Fumio Itō	Kenji Konuta	Masakatsu Iijima	August 22, 2026
231	"Battle Vs. the Teachers?!"; Transliteration: "Sensei-tachi to Ninjara Batoru!?" (Japanese: 先生たちとニンジャラバトル！？)	Fukutarō Hattori	Kōji Bandai	Tsukasa Sunaga	August 29, 2026
232	"Fast Food!"; Transliteration: "Kitchin Mashin Mō Rēsu!" (Japanese: キッチンマシン猛レース！)	Won-Hoe Kim	Shūichi Kōyama	Akihiro Enomoto	September 5, 2026
233	"Tough to be Famous"; Transliteration: "Karisuma wa Tsurai yo" (Japanese: カリスマはつらいよ)	Sōta Shiro	Yoshifumi Fukushima	Takeshi Mori	September 12, 2026
234	"The Lucy Wannabe Trio"; Transliteration: "Katte ni Rūshī San'ningumi" (Japanese: 勝手にルーシー三人組)	Kazuya Fujishiro	Kenjin Sata	Kazuya Fujishiro	September 19, 2026
235	"A Spicy Disguise"; Transliteration: "Kareinaru Supaishī Kamen" (Japanese: 華麗なるスパイシー仮面)	Fumio Itō	Shinji Satō	Tsukasa Sunaga	September 26, 2026
236	"Ezet the Book Critic"; Transliteration: "Ezetto Shohyō-ka ni Naru" (Japanese: エゼット書評家になる)	Ken Kiyota	Natsumi Morichi	Takeshi Mori	October 3, 2026
237	"Take Ninjas Out to the Ball Game"; Transliteration: "Ninja o Yakyū ni Tsuretette" (Japanese: ニンジャを野球につれてって)	Fukutarō Hattori	Kenji Konuta	Toshiyuki Kashiyama	October 10, 2026
238	"Quest for the Perfect Soup"; Transliteration: "Tadoritsuke! Sūpu no Kyokuchi" (Japanese: たどりつけ！スープの極致)	Akira Shimizu	Kōji Bandai	Masakatsu Iijima	October 17, 2026
239	"S-Rank Ninja Buddy Mission"; Transliteration: "Badi de Idomu S-kyū Ninmu!" (Japanese: バディで挑むS級忍務！)	Masahito Otani	Shūichi Kōyama	Takeshi Mori	October 24, 2026
240	"SHINOBI Returns"; Transliteration: "SHINOBI Ritānzu" (Japanese: SHINOBIリターンズ)	Fumio Itō	Yoshifumi Fukushima	Tsukasa Sunaga	October 31, 2026
241	"Dear Gramps"; Transliteration: "Haikei Jii-chan." (Japanese: 拝啓じいちゃん。)	Fukutarō Hattori	Kōji Bandai	Akihiro Enomoto	November 7, 2026
242	"The Phantom Thief Comes Calling Again!"; Transliteration: "Nozome! Kaitō X kara no Yokoku-jō 2" (Japanese: 挑め！怪盗Xからの予告状2)	Won-Hoe Kim	Kenjin Sata	Takeshi Mori	November 14, 2026
243	"Iron Ninjala Competition"; Transliteration: "Tamashī no Baton! Ninjara Retsujin Rēsu" (Japanese: 魂のバトン！ニンジャラ鉄人レース)	TBA	TBA	TBA	November 21, 2026
244	Transliteration: "Gamutchi Shōkan sa reta-tchi! ?" (Japanese: ガムッチ召喚されたッチ！？)	TBA	TBA	TBA	November 21, 2026
