= Shi Chong =

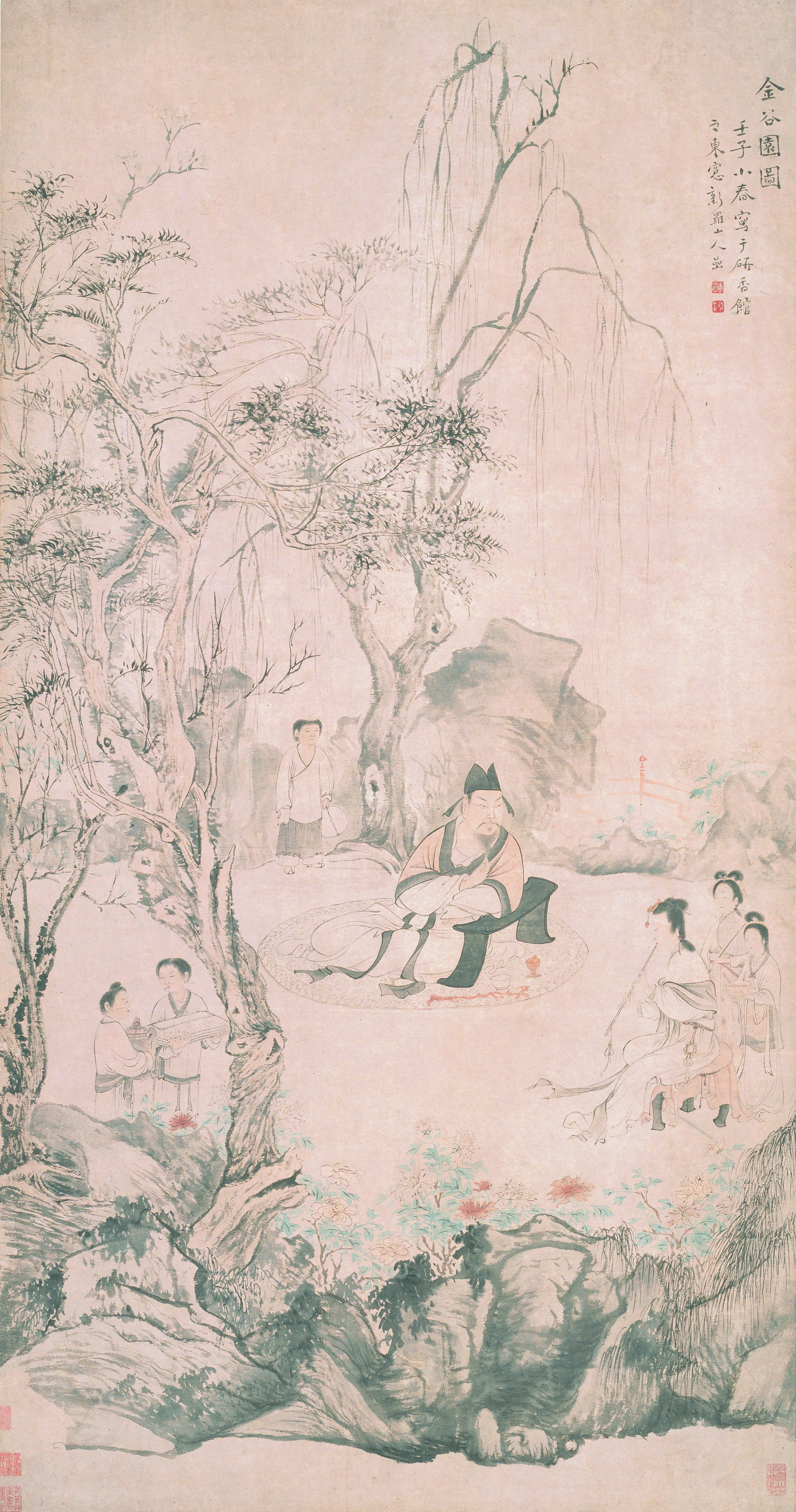
- The painting Golden Valley Villa by Hua Yan, 1732, depicting Shi Chong listening to the music of Lüzhu
- Chinese: 石崇
Transcriptions
Standard Mandarin
- Hanyu Pinyin: Shí Chóng
- Wade–Giles: Shih Ch'ung

Courtesy name Shi Jilun
- Chinese: 石季倫
Transcriptions
Standard Mandarin
- Wade–Giles: Shí Jìlún

Shi Chong (249–300), courtesy name Jilun, was a Chinese politician of the Western Jin Dynasty. He was a son of situ Shi Bao (石苞; c.197 - 30 March 273). (Note: A Shiyu annotation in Deng Ai's biography in Sanguozhi recorded that Shi was of the same age as Deng. Shi Chong's biography in Book of Jin recorded that he died in the 8th year of the Taishi era. However, both the annals of Emperor Wu in the same work and vol. 80 of Zizhi Tongjian recorded that he died on the guisi day of the 2nd month of the 9th year of the Taishi era.) He was known for his luxurious lifestyle.

== Life ==
Shi Chong was the sixth son of situ Shi Bao (石苞). At a young age, he showed great intelligence and courage. As a result, his father decided to leave no property for him, as he was confident that Shi Chong could make a fortune on his own. Shi Chong first served as magistrate of Xiuwu County and Governor of Chengyang Commandery (a commandery in Jiaodong Peninsula, centered in Ju County). He became Marquis of Anyang Village due to his participation in the Conquest of Wu by Jin. Later, he rose to the position of Palace Attendant.

After the death of Emperor Wu of Jin in May 290, Yang Jun became regent to Emperor Hui. As a dissident, Shi Chong left the capital and became Inspector of Jingzhou. (Note: Wang Yin's Jin Shu recorded that Shi became immensely wealthy during his stint at Jingzhou as he robbed and killed. His biography in the Tang-era Book of Jin had a similar record: that he robbed merchants who plied distant trade routes.) Later, he was appointed as dasinong (大司农, in charge of finance). However, the appointment was cancelled because he left his post before the official announcement. Shortly after, he was appointed as Zhenglu Jiangjun, guarding the Xuzhou region. Soon, he was removed after an incident where he became drunk and fought with Gao Dan, Governor of Xuzhou.

After Queen Regent Jia Nanfeng gained power, he became a friend of Jia's nephew, Jia Mi, by flattering the latter. It was recorded that whenever Guo Huai, Jia Nanfeng's mother passed by, Shi would stop and prostrate himself before her.

In the first year of the Yongkang era (300), the Prince of Zhao, Sima Lun, exterminated the Jia family in May. Shi Chong was removed from his post as an ally of the family. Sun Xiu, a favorite of Sima Lun, hated Shi Chong over the beauty of Shi's concubine, Lüzhu (绿珠), and framed Shi that he had conspired with Prince of Huainan, Sima Yun, who rebelled against Sima Lun. Shi Chong was subsequently executed along with his family; Pan Yue and his family were also executed.

== Notable anecdotes ==
Shi Chong was best known for his extravagant lifestyle. As Governor of Jingzhou, Shi accumulated huge wealth by engaging in highway robbery, often murdering merchants passing by for their property. Shi Chong and Wang Kai (王恺), a consort kin, (Note: Wang Kai's elder sister was Wang Yuanji, mother of Emperor Wu of Jin.) loathed each other. (Note: However, the Jin Zhu Gong Zan recorded that Wang Kai and Shi Chong were friends.) After learning that Wang Kai's family used sugar water to clean their dishes and pots, Shi ordered his servants to burn candles instead of firewood. On the road to his manor, Wang decorated the roadside barriers with purple silk for 40 li (c. 15 km). On learning this, Shi covered 50 li with more expensive multicolored silk. Emperor Wu of Jin once sent Wang Kai a coral tree (Viburnum odoratissimum) two chi (c. 50 cm) in height as a gift. Shi Chong visited him, smashed it with an iron ruyi, and offered him several coral trees 3–4 chi in height in return.

A New Account of the Tales of the World recorded that whenever Shi Chong held a banquet, he would order his beautiful female servants to persuade his guests to drink; if a guest failed to empty his cup; the female servant would be executed. (Note: Wang Dun's biography in Book of Jin attributed this cruel act to Wang Su's son (and Wang Yuanji's brother) Wang Kai.)

== See also ==
- Jin'gu Villa
