= Jinguyuan =

Jin'gu Villa (Traditional Chinese: 金谷園; pinyin: Jīngǔ Yuán; also translated as Golden Valley Villa) was a famous private garden-estate in ancient Luoyang during the Western Jin dynasty.

It was owned by the brutal aristocrat Shi Chong (石崇). Lüzhu was his singing girl, renowned for her beauty and flute-playing. Shi Chong's rival, Sun Xiu, coveted her and tried to obtain her from Shi Chong, but Shi Chong would not give her up. In the end, Sun Xiu's faction seized Shi Chong and resolved to put him to death. Lü Zhu chose to end her own life, following him into death as an act of devoted fidelity.

Because of this story of beauty perished and splendor turned to emptiness, many poets have written about it, including Zhang Ji (張繼), Du Mu (杜牧), Li Xianyong (李咸用), Su Zheng (蘇拯), Cao Song (曹松), and Xu Teng (徐熥) etc..

== Poem by Du Mu ==
This is a historical-themed poem by the 9th-century poet Du Mu. He composed it while travelling in Luoyang, after seeing the ruined walls and remains of the Golden Valley Villa.

中文

繁華事散逐香塵
流水無情草自春
日暮東風怨啼鳥
落花猶似墜樓人

Modern Pinyin

fán huá shì sàn zhú xiāng chén (Note: “Fragrant dust”: the finest powder of aloeswood. It is said that Shi Chong, in order to train the footwork of the dancing girls in his household, would spread aloeswood shavings over an ivory bed and have them tread upon it; those who left no trace were rewarded with pearls.)
liú shuǐ wú qíng cǎo zì chūn
rì mù dōng fēng yuàn tí niǎo
luò huā yóu sì zhuì lóu rén (Note: i.e. Lüzhu)

English Translation

Golden ages have faded, turning to fragrant dust.
Stream flows with no heart, while the grasses rise in spring.
In the twilight, birds mourn within the eastern breeze,
That figure falls from the terrace like a scattering of petal.
