= Cradle of Eternity =

Studio album by Yuko Suzuhana
- Released: November 23, 2016
- Recorded: 2016
- Genres: J-pop; pop rock
- Length: 40:58
- Language: Japanese
- Label: Avex Trax

Music video
- Cradle of Eternity all songs digest on YouTube

CD+DVD/Blu-ray cover

Cradle of Eternity is the debut solo album by Wagakki Band lead vocalist Yuko Suzuhana, released on November 23, 2016, by Avex Trax in three editions: CD only, two-disc CD, and CD with DVD or Blu-ray. In contrast to Wagakki Band's style of mixing traditional Japanese musical instruments (wagakki) with heavy metal, the album features a more mainstream J-pop sound. Initial releases of the album included a trading card with a code to download the character Yuko Ortensia (ユーコ・オルテンシア, Yūko Orutenshia) for the PS Vita game SD Gundam G Generation Genesis. A mu-mo Shop exclusive release included a keychain of Yuko Ortensia.

The album peaked at No. 6 on Oricon's albums chart.

== Track listing ==
CD
No.	Title	Writer(s)	Arrangement	Length
1.	"Eisei no Cradle" (Eisei no Kureidoru (永世のクレイドル; "Cradle of Eternity"))	Kurousa-P	Tatsuya Kurauchi	4:35
2.	"Senka no Tomoshibi" ((戦火の灯火; "The Lights of War"))	Kurousa-P	Kurauchi	4:31
3.	"Step Forward"	Yuko Suzuhana	Hikarisyuyo	4:21
4.	"Yuki Tokei" ((雪時計; "Snow Clock"))	Suzuhana	Yuta Nakano	4:58
5.	"Remains"	Kurousa-P	Kurauchi	4:14
6.	"Senaka Awase" ((背中合わせ; "Back to Back"))	Suzuhana	Jin Nakamura	4:40
7.	"Eisei no Cradle -Piano Solo-" (Eisei no Kureidoru -Piano Solo- (永世のクレイドル-PIANO SOLO-; "Cradle of Eternity -Piano Solo-"))	Kurousa-P	Suzuhana	4:32
Total length:				40:58

CD Only bonus track
No.	Title	Writer(s)	Arrangement	Length
8.	"Remains -Ballad-"	Kurousa-P	Kurauchi	4:03

2CD Edition Disc 2
No.	Title	Writer(s)	Arrangement	Length
1.	"Re: I Am"	Hiroyuki Sawano	Toshiya Onishi	5:55
2.	"Mizu no Hoshi e Ai wo Komete" ((水の星へ愛をこめて; "From the Aqueous Star with Love"))	Neil Sedaka; Masao Urino	Onishi	3:29

DVD/Blu-ray
No.	Title	Length
1.	"Eisei no Cradle" (Music video)
2.	"Eisei no Cradle" (Making)

== Charts ==
Chart (2016)	Peak position
Japanese Albums (Oricon)	6
Japanese Hot Albums (Billboard)	8
Japanese Top Albums Sales (Billboard)	3
