= Zhang Ji (poet from Hubei) =

Chinese poet

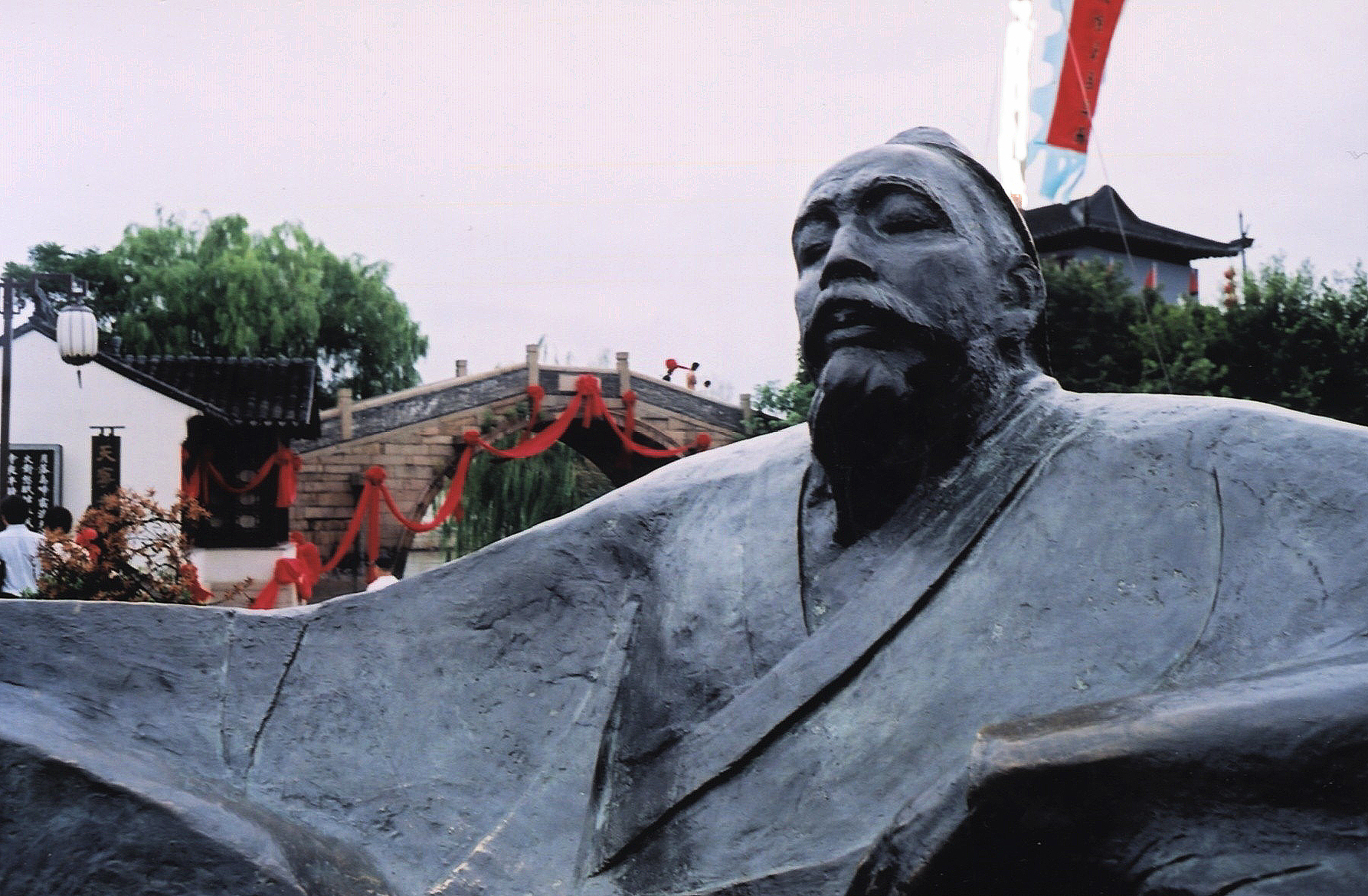
Statue of Zhang Ji at the Maple Bridge, Suzhou

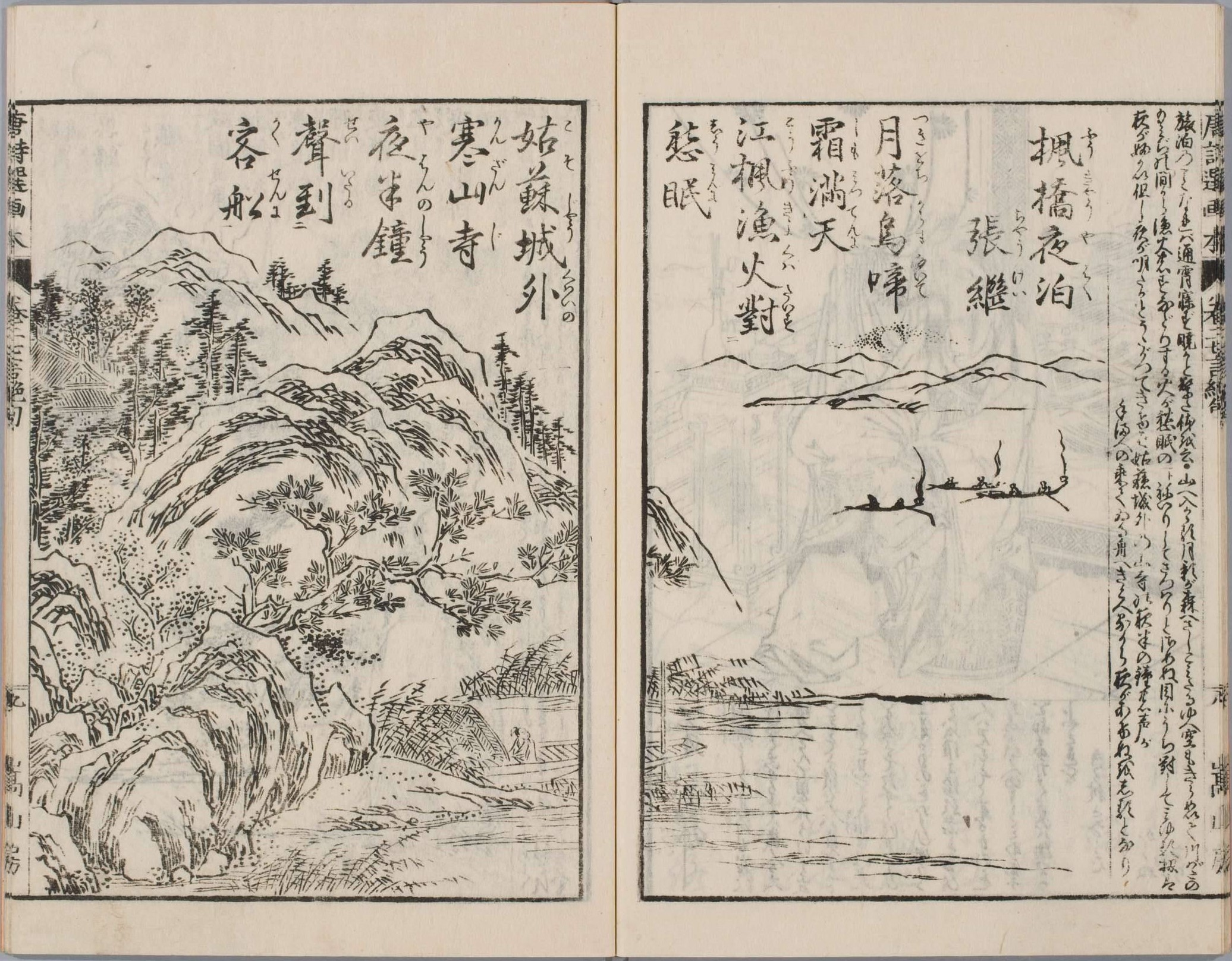
"A Night-mooring near Maple Bridge" by Zhang Ji, in a Japanese edition of selected Tang poems with illustrations (1836).

Zhang Ji (traditional Chinese: 張繼; simplified Chinese: 张继; pinyin: Zhāng Jì; Wade–Giles: Chang Chi; fl. 8th century), courtesy name Yisun (懿孙), was a Chinese poet born in Xiangyang during the Tang dynasty.

Little is known of his life; his approximate dates are 712–715 to 779; he is known to have passed the jinshi examination in 753. He rose to be a secretary in the Board of Revenue.

He is incorrectly credited under the name Chang Tsi as the author of the original Chinese text for the second movement of Das Lied von der Erde by Gustav Mahler. The actual author of the poem used by Mahler was Qian Qi.

== Poetry ==
Zhang is correctly credited with one poem which was included in the classic anthology Three Hundred Tang Poems, which was translated by Witter Bynner as "A Night-mooring near Maple Bridge" (楓橋夜泊) which references the Maple Bridge (楓橋), in Suzhou(蘇州) near the Hanshan Temple and its bells, which became famous because of this poem.

Japanese poets used some of his poems for Japanese typical Shigin singing-style poetry.
