= Qijue =

Classical Chinese poetry form

Qīyán juéjù (七言絕句; abbr. qījué 七絕), known in Japan as shichigon-zekku (七言絶句Japanese pronunciation: [jɕi.tɕi.go.ɴ.zeꜜ.k.kɯ]), is a type of jueju poetry form consisting of four phrases each seven Chinese characters (or kanji) in length.

Shichigon-zekku are the most common form of classical Chinese poems (kanshi), and the standard form of shigin (Japanese chanted poetry).

== Composition ==
In composing Qiyan Jueju, the character of the phrases (Jueju) is important. The rules are as follows:

- First phrase Qiju (起句, "bringing into being"): Depiction of the scene
- Second phrase Chengju (承句, "understanding"): Add further illustration and detail to the Qiju
- Third phrase Zhuanju (転句, "changing"): By changing the scene of action, reveal the true essence of the poem
- Fourth phrase Jueju (結句, "drawing together"): In assimilating the Zhuanju draw together and complete the poem

== History ==
Heptasyllabic jueju imported from the continent replaced earlier song forms at the early Heian court after the capital was moved to Heiankyō in 795. At the court they served to create a sense of community.

== Examples ==
- Example of qiyan jueju:

"江南春绝句"

千里鶯啼綠映紅，
水村山郭酒旗風。
南朝四百八十寺，
多少樓臺煙雨中。

— Du Mu (杜牧)
(803～852)
Translation:

"Spring of the South"

Thousands of miles of birds' singing, light green along the Yangtze river;
Ponds and hills circling the village with flags in the soothing wind;
Amid the four hundred and eighty temples of the Southern Dynasties;
How many terraces are in the misty cold rains?

- Example of shichigon-zekku:

"富士山"

仙客来遊雲外巓
神龍棲老洞中渕
雪如丸素煙如柄
白扇倒懸東海天

— Ishikawa Jozan (石川丈山)
(1583～1672)
Translation:

"Mount Fuji"

This great peak above the clouds, where hermit-wizards came for sport
The deep pools of whose caverns holy dragons have inhabited from old
The snow is like white silk, the rising smoke like a handle
A great white fan inverted, in the heavens above the eastern sea

== See also ==
- Chinese poetry
- Jueju
- Kishōtenketsu
- Shigin
- Japanese poetry
