= Shigin =

Japanese poetry performance

Example gin with vocal annotation to the right of each character, Shān xíng, is poetry from Chinese poet Du Mu (9th century)

Shigin (Japanese: 詩吟; IPA: [ɕiɡiɴ]) is a performance of reciting a Japanese poem or a Chinese poem read in Japanese, each poem (詩 shi) usually chanted (吟 gin) by an individual or in a group. Reciting can be done loudly before a large audience, softly to a few friends, or quietly to the reciter themselves.

Each reciting is also termed gin. Any forms of Japanese and Chinese poetry are used for reciting.

Kanshi and classical Chinese poems are usually composed of four or more lines of Chinese characters, or kanji (漢字), each line having the same number of characters. Gin with four phrases, each seven characters long (the most common), are classified as shichigon-zekku (七言絶句; "seven-word quatrains"). The melody of a given poem will vary depending on the style or school.

In Vietnam, "Shigin" (詩吟) exists under the name of "Thơ Ngâm" (詩吟).

== Performance ==
Members of a shigin group will usually gather to train in a washitsu, or Japanese-style room with tatami matting. Participants kneel in the lotus or seiza position, thought to be the optimum posture to allow strong and steady projection during chanting. They are encouraged to focus their energy in their gut (thought in Zen to be the locus of power) and sing by slowly expelling this energy. Conversely, singing from the chest, as would be encouraged in classical Western operatic style, is deemed unauthentic.

During practice, members may refer to the written gin to aid memory. This is usually annotated, with marks to the right of each character denoting how the tone should vary through the length of its vocalisation.

Breathing intervals are indicated by right-angular strokes to the left of the character (a typical gin will last approximately one and a half minutes, in four breaths). Finally, because Japanese and Chinese word orders differ, further (sino) numerical marks to the left of some characters indicate their correct sequence.

A rising then falling tone

Falling tone, usually ending a phrase

Steady tone, breath and numeric

Gin are formally performed standing, and from memory. Because of this, recital of longer gin is sometimes seen as more accomplished (being harder to remember, and more likely to vary from the standard melodic form). The vocal may be accompanied by traditional Japanese instruments such as the Koto or Shakuhachi. Dress may be Western (suit) or traditional (kimono or yukata).

Gin are also used in the performance of certain Japanese dances, such as kenshibu. In such cases, gin may either be performed live or played from recordings.

== History ==
Shigin are thought to have originated in China early in the first millennium AD, and may have entered Japan amongst other texts brought back from China in the 5th century. They were most likely sung originally in Chinese, but were later given Japanese readings, which are used in their contemporary recital. New gin were written, often detailing particular Japanese concepts or events, but the standard written layout has remained.

Shigin are thus significantly older than other, more popular Japanese poetry forms, such as Haiku. Their practice is now a minority art, mostly confined to the elderly and little known amongst younger generations. Nevertheless, several Shigin festivals are held throughout the year, including the Autumn Shigin Festival (秋吟会) in Shiogama and Shinjo, in the North-East (Tōhoku) region of Japan. Gin are also sung at Buddhist ceremonies and quasi-religious gatherings in Japan.

Moreover, although largely in anonymity, Shigin continue to have a significant influence on Japanese culture. Individual poems are often studied in Japanese textbooks, and are regularly displayed at exhibitions of Japanese calligraphy.

From 2013 onwards, a Japanese fusion band called Wagakki Band began to be active and quickly became popular nationwide and online. The band incorporates shigin, kenshibu, kenbu, shibu, vocaloid, wagakki (traditional Japanese instruments) and rock elements and the vocalist, Yuko Suzuhana, is a shigin master and utilises shigin technique in performances with the ambition to raise interest among the youth and around the world. Some of their songs contain a section of shigin.

== Examples ==
The example below is a tanka about Mount Iwate by Japanese poet Takuboku Ishikawa (1886 – 1912, ja:石川啄木#代表歌), with Japanese pronunciation shown in parentheses

ふるさとの 山に向ひて 言ふことなし

ふるさとの山は ありがたきかな

To the mountain of my hometown I have nothing to say,
(Furusato no yama ni mukaite iu koto nashi)
Except my sincerest gratitude to my mountain.
(Furusato no yama wa arigataki kana)

The second example is a Kanshi poem by Japanese educator Hirose Tansō (1782 – 1856, ja:広瀬淡窓#史跡), who encouraged his students to live together as well as study together at his institution in Kyushu:

桂林荘雑詠示諸生
（桂林荘雑詠、諸生に示す）

休道他郷多苦辛
（道（い）ふを休（や）めよ、他郷苦辛多しと。）
同胞有友自相親
（同胞友あり、自（おのずか）ら相親しむ。）
柴扉暁出霜如雪
（柴扉（さいひ）暁に出づれば、霜雪の如し。）
君汲川流我拾薪
（君は川流（せんりゅう）を汲め、我は薪（たきぎ）を拾はん。）

A Statement at Keirin Institute, To the Students
(Keirin so zatsuei, Shosei ni shimesu)

You must not complain that it is too much trouble to study here.
(Iu wo yameyo, takyo kushin oshi to)
You have many friends to study together with.
(Doho tomo ari, onozukara ai-shitashimu)
When you open the door in the early morning, the frost outside looks like snow.
(Saihi akatsuki ni izureba, shimo yuki no gotoshi)
You go to the river to get water, and I will go collecting wood.
(Kimi wa senryu wo kume, ware wa takigi wo hirowan)

The third example below illustrates a typical gin from Chinese poet Zhang Ji (8th century), written in the original Chinese, and in Japanese (as written and pronounced in parentheses):

楓橋夜泊
（楓橋夜泊）

月落烏啼霜満天
（月落ち烏啼いて、霜天に満つ）
江楓漁火對愁眠
（江楓の漁火、愁眠に対す）
姑蘇城外寒山寺
（姑蘇城外、寒山寺）
夜半鐘声到客船
（夜半の鐘声、客船に到る）

Night Mooring at the Maple Bridge
(Fukyo Yahaku)

The moon falls, crows call, frosty mists fill the heavens
(Tsuki ochi karasu naite, shimo ten ni mitsu)
Looking out from maple bridge, distant fishing lamps pierce these lonely eyes
(Kofu no gyoka, shumin ni taisu)
Outside Suzhou City, from the Cold Mountain Temple
(Koso jogai, kanzanji)
The midnight gong rings out, as the boats return
(Yahan no shosei, kyakusen ni itaru)

(NB: Subject terms have been added to give a sense to the poem, but no such terms exist in the original Chinese.)

== See also ==
- Poetry reading

== Notes ==
- Challenge Your Possibility Yomiuri Shimbun article.
- www.shigin.com (in Japanese)
- 判り易い詩の吟じ方 (Wakari-yasui Shi no Ginjikata) - Japanese Shigin manual
