= Du Mu =

Chinese calligrapher, poet and politician (803–852)

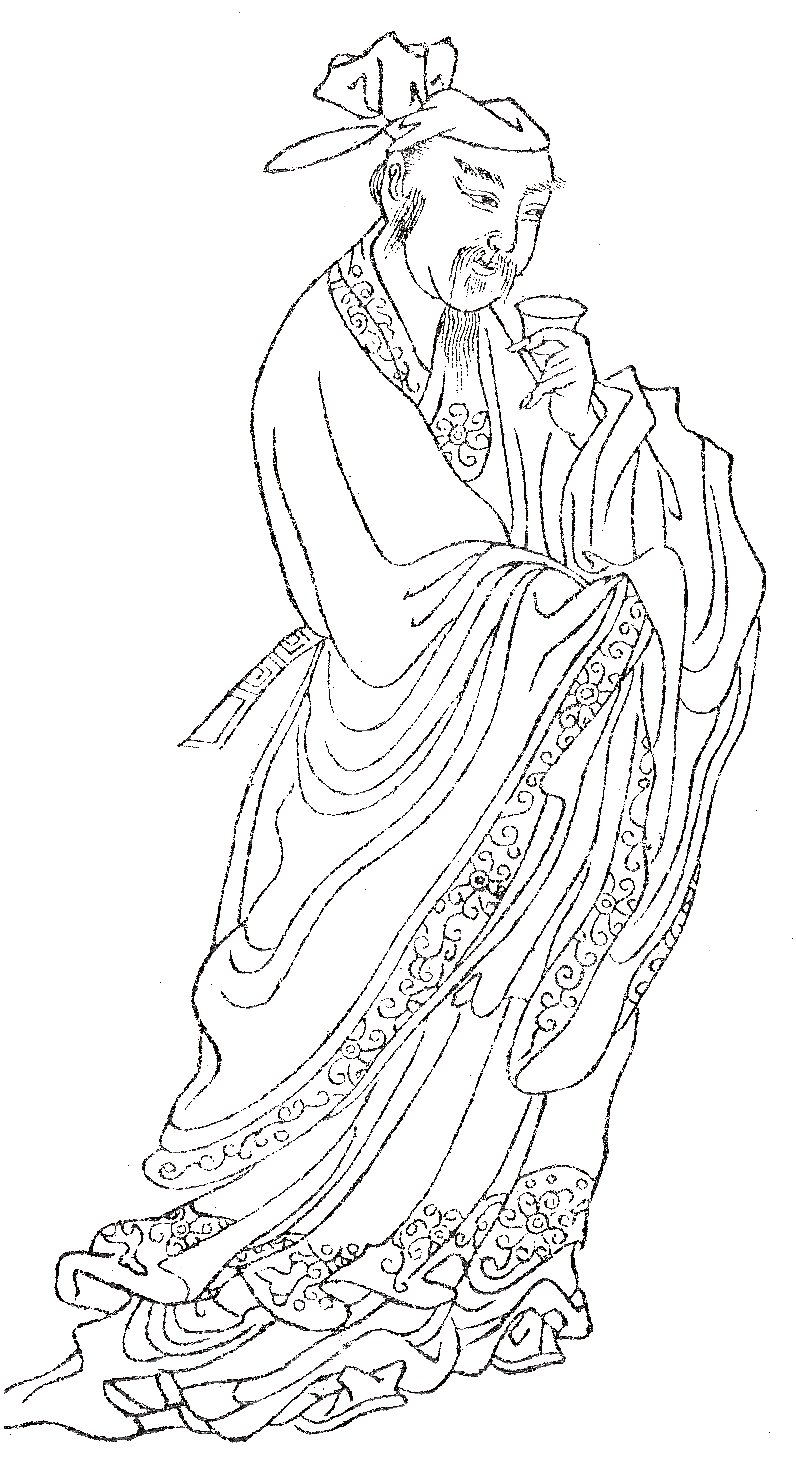
- Du Mu by Shangguan Zhou (上官周, b. 1665)
- Born: 803; Chang'an
- Died: 852; Chang'an
- Occupations: Calligrapher, poet, politician
- Writing career
- Period: Tang dynasty

Du Mu (Chinese: 杜牧; pinyin: Dù Mù; Wade–Giles: Tu^{4} Mu^{4}; 803 – 852) was a Chinese calligrapher, poet, and politician who lived during the late Tang dynasty. His courtesy name was Muzhi (牧之), and art name Fanchuan (樊川). He is best known for his lyrical and romantic quatrains.

Regarded as a major poet during a golden age of Chinese poetry, his name is often mentioned together with that of another renowned Late Tang poet, Li Shangyin, as the "Little Li-Du" (小李杜), in contrast to the "Great Li-Du": Li Bai and Du Fu. Among his influences were Du Fu, Li Bai, Han Yu and Liu Zongyuan.

== Biography ==
Du Mu was born in the Tang capital Chang'an (modern Xi'an) into an elite family, the Jingzhao Du clan, whose fortunes were declining. His grandfather was Du You, a minister at the Tang court and the compiler of the Tang Dynasty encyclopedia Tongdian. He passed the jinshi ("Presented Scholar") level of the imperial civil service examination in 828 at the age of 25, and began his career as a bureaucrat holding a series of minor posts, first as an editor of at the Institute for the Advancement of Literature. A few months later, he joined the entourage of Shen Chuanshi (沈傳師), a surveillance commissioner, first to Hongzhou, then a year later to Xuanzhou. Du Mu also graduated as chin shih in about 830.In 833 he was sent to join Niu Sengru in Yangzhou. In Yangzhou he began to mature as a poet. In 835 he was appointed investigating censor and returned to the capital where, possibly concerned about being drawn into a factional dispute involving his friend Li Gan who had opposed Zheng Zhu, he asked to be transferred to Luoyang. This was granted, and he avoided the purge that followed the Sweet Dew Incident which happened later in the year.

Du Mu held many official positions in various locales through the years, but he never achieved a high rank, perhaps due to enemies made in the factional dispute at the imperial court in 835. In 837 he returned to Yangzhou to care for his younger brother Du Yi who was sick and had become blind, then went to work in Xuanzhou, taking his brother with him. In 838 he was appointed Rectifier of Omission of the Left and Senior Compiler of the History Office, and he returned to Chang'an. In 840 he was promoted to Vice Director of the Catering Bureau, then transferred to the position of Vice Director of the Board of Review in 841. Starting in 842 he was made governor of a succession of small poor rural prefectures, first Huangzhou, then Chizhou and Muzhou. Du was dissatisfied with the appointment and he appeared to blame it on Li Deyu. He began to feel his career was a failure and he expressed his dissatisfaction in his poems.

In 848 Du Mu returned to Chang'an after being appointed Vice Director of Merit Titles and was awarded his old post in the History Office. He was transferred to the post of the Vice Director of the Ministry of Personnel in 849, then was appointed governor of Huzhou in 850 at his own request. He was recalled to Chang'an in 851 to the post of Director of the Bureau of Evaluation and Drafter, and was appointed to the office of Secretariat and Drafter in 852. He fell ill that winter and died before the next lunar year.

== Works ==
Du Mu was skilled in shi, fu and ancient Chinese prose. He is best known as the writer of sensual, lyrical quatrains featuring historical sites or romantic situations, and often on themes of separation, decadence, or impermanence. His style blends classical imagery and diction with striking juxtapositions, colloquialisms, or other wordplay. He also wrote long narrative poems.

=== Poetry ===
One of his best-known poems is "Qingming Festival" (Qingming Festival is a day of remembrance for the dead when people visit the graves of their ancestors to pay respect.)

清明

清明時節雨紛紛，
路上行人欲断魂。
借問酒家何處有？
牧童遥指杏花村。

Qingming Festival

On day of Qingming Festival, a drizzly rain falls.
On the road, the traveller, disconsolate.
Enquiring, where can an inn be found?
A cowherd boy points, far away, to Apricot Blossom Village.

Another well-known one is Autumn Evening. It tells of a lonely concubine at the palace whose fan has lost its purpose now that summer has ended. This is taken to be an allusion by the poet of his frustrations at his family's decline in influence. The Cowherd and the Weaver Girl in the poem refers to the story of two separated lovers who can only meet once a year and who were used to name the Altair and Vega stars:

秋夕

銀燭秋光冷畫屏，
輕羅小扇撲流螢。
天階夜色涼如水，
臥看牛郞織女星。

Autumn Evening

Silvery candle, autumnal light, chills the painted screen
With small fan, of light silk gauze, she swipes at the flitting fireflies
On the palace steps, the night is cool, like water
Laying down, she gazes, the Cowherd and the Weaver Girl stars

Du Mu enjoyed traveling in the misty mountains of southeast China, especially Xuanzhou, and remembering the fallen Southern dynasties, as exemplified by his poem "Written on the Kaiyuan Temple at Xuanzhou" (Tí Xuānzhōu Kāiyuán Sì 提宣州開元寺):

南朝謝脁城 東吳最深處 亡國去如鴻 遺寺藏煙塢 樓飛九十尺 廊環四百柱 高高下下中 風繞松桂樹 青苔照朱閣 白鳥兩相語 溪聲入僧夢 月色暉粉堵 閱景無旦夕 憑闌有今古 留我酒一罇 前山看春雨	Xie Tiao's mansion from the Southern Dynasties, Most deepset of places in eastern Wu. The fallen kingdom like wild swan gone, Left this temple in misty hollow concealed. The great hall soars up ninety feet, By a porch of four hundred pillars ringed. Between the highest heights and lowest depths, Winds turn through the pines and cassia. Green mosses shine by its crimson towers, White birds talk to each other in pairs. The brook's sound enters the dreams of monks, And the moonlight glows on its stucco walls. The scene surveyed, whether dawn or dusk, Lean on its railings, past and present too. I linger here with my flagon of wine, And watch spring rain in the hills ahead.
—(Stephen Owen, trans.)

=== Prose ===
He wrote a commentary on The Art of War and many letters of advice to high officials.

A twenty-book collection of his prose works, Fan Chuan Wen Ji (Chinese: 樊川文集; pinyin: fánchuān wénjí), survives.

== Modern references ==
In 1968, Roger Waters of the rock band Pink Floyd borrowed lines from his poetry including "Lotuses lean on each other in yearning" (多少綠荷相倚恨) to create the lyrics for the song "Set the Controls for the Heart of the Sun" from the band's second album A Saucerful of Secrets.

== See also ==
- Chinese poetry
- Qijue
- Jin'gu Villa

== Works cited ==
- Noguchi, Kazuo (1994). "Du Mu (To Boku in Japanese)". Encyclopedia Nipponica (in Japanese). Shogakukan.
