= Kenshibu =

Kenshibu (剣詩舞, meaning 'sword and poetry dancing') is a category of Japanese interpretive dances performed to traditional music accompanied by poetry known as shigin (詩吟). Kenbu refers to dances performed with the aid of a sword, and shibu to dances performed with one or more fans. While fans may also be employed in some kenbu dances, not all require them.

== History ==
Although Japanese kenbu existed since the Nara and Heian periods (794-1185) of Japanese history, and exist in Shura Nogaku, the modern kenshibu is an invention of the post-Meiji era (1868).

Kenshibu draws its origins from the Gekken Kaisha (撃剣会社, lit. 'fencing company') created by Sakakibara Kenkichi (榊原健吉) in 1872. The Gekken Kaisha toured Japan, engaging in 'fencing performances' (撃剣興行, gekken kougyou) which quickly became popular. Many modern schools of kenbu derive from other traditions, but Sakakibara's Gekken Kaisha was the first to explore the form.

Following the end of World War II, swords were outlawed in Japan for a period of about seven years. During this time, kenbu schools adopted the use of fans instead of swords in their dances. After swords became legal once again, this new type of dancing was retained. Over time shibu has evolved into a style distinct from kenbu, with its dances set to poetry of a less martial character.

== Kenbu ==
Kenbu (剣舞, occ. 剣武) is performed in hakama and kimono, wearing tabi, a type of divided-toe socks. Various other items may be used in the costume, including hachimaki (a headband used to keep the dancer's hair pulled back) and tasuki (a white cloth strip which ties the kimono sleeves out of the way). When these other items are used, a white cloth belt is traditionally worn over the hakama ties. This white belt was originally worn by samurai preparing to go into battle and served to reinforce the hakama ties so that, in the event they were cut, the samurai would not find himself with his pants suddenly heaped around his ankles.

== Shibu ==
Shibu (詩舞) is also called senbu (扇舞), or fan dancing. It is also performed in hakama and kimono, though in some cases hakama may be rejected in favor of longer kimono. Some performances also involve steeply-pointed straw hats which conceal the performers' faces.
