= Hua Yan =

Chinese painter

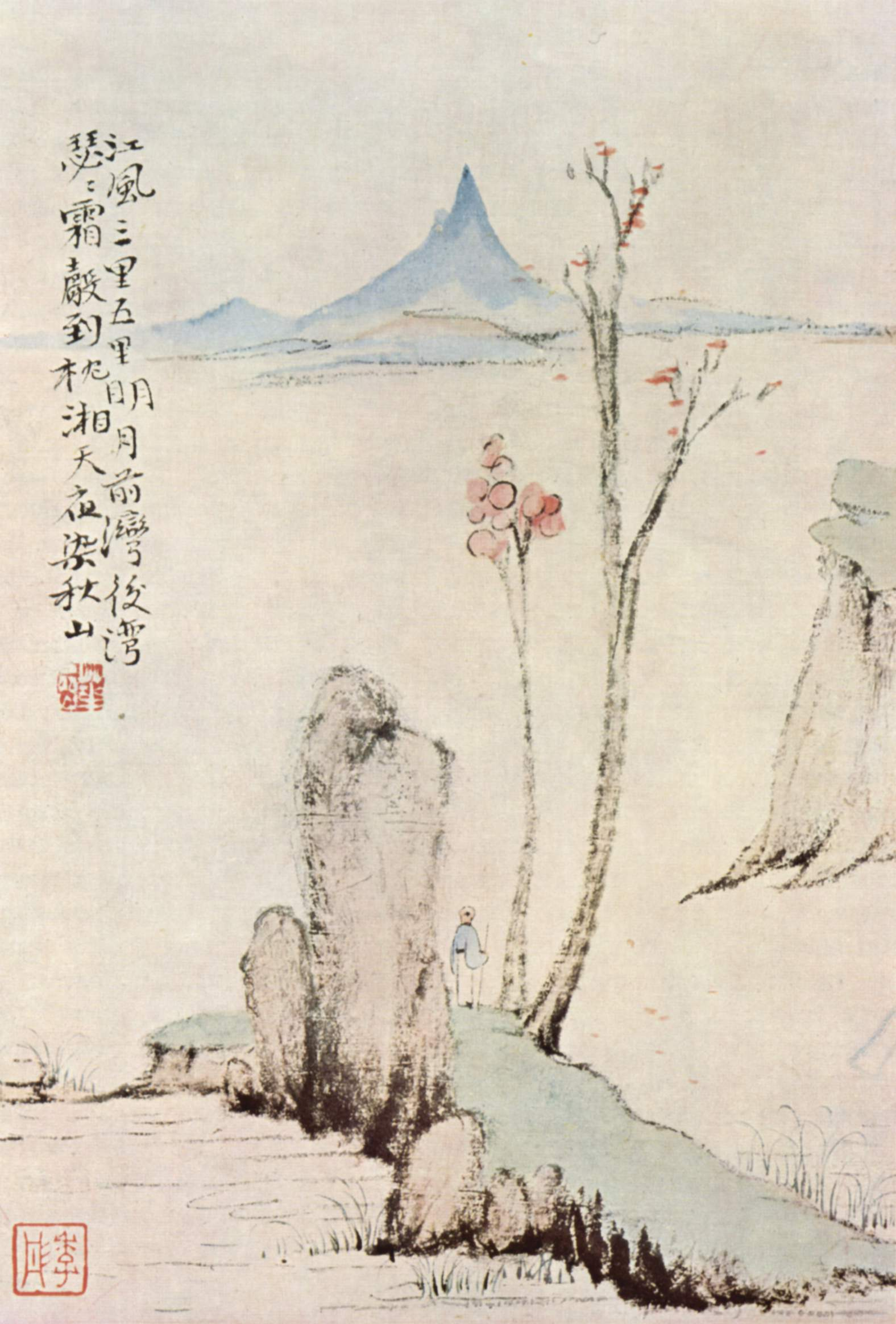
Hua Yan, Autumn Scene, Freer Gallery of Art, 1729

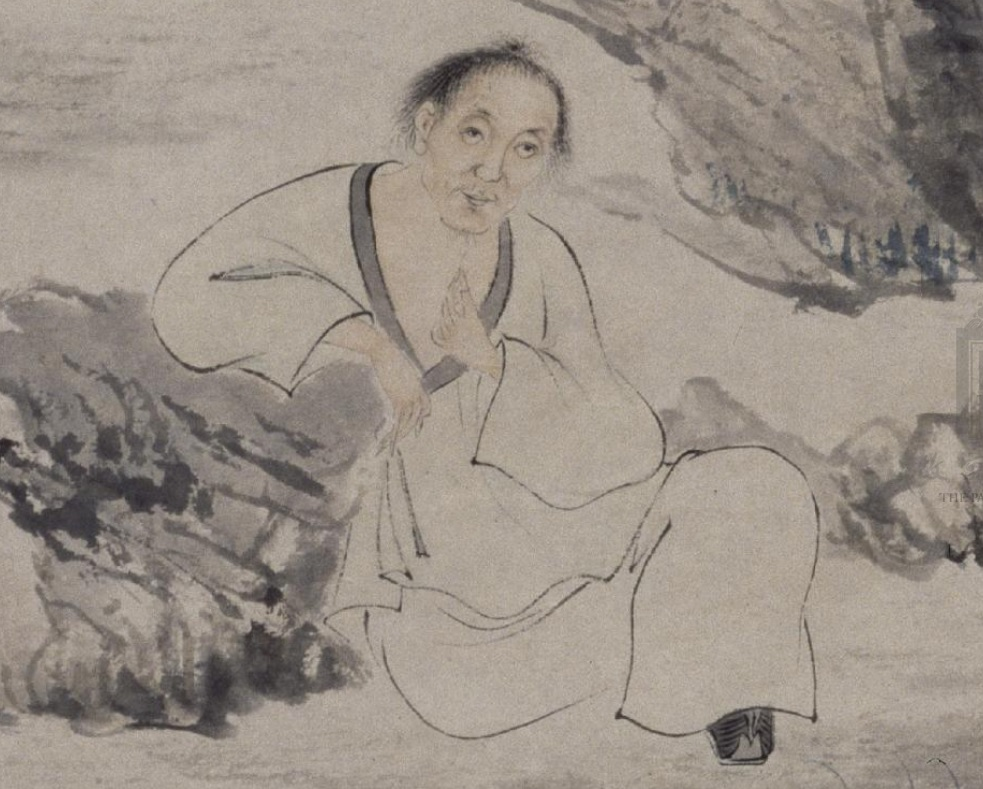
Hua Yan autoportrait

Hua Yan (1682 – 1756) simplified Chinese: 华嵒; traditional Chinese: 華嵒; pinyin: Huà Yán; Wade–Giles: Hua Yen; courtesy name Qiu Yue (秋岳), sobriquets Xinluo Shanren (新罗山人), Dong Yuan Sheng (东园生), Buyi Sheng (布衣生), Ligou Jushi (离垢居士)and Bosha Daoren (白沙道人) was a Chinese painter during the Qing dynasty. He was born in Shanghang (上杭) Fujian province and lived in Yangzhou and later in Hangzhou. Yan's work is within the tradition of the Yangzhou school and is often named as one of the Eight Eccentrics of Yangzhou.

== See also ==
- Eight Eccentrics of Yangzhou
