= Yuko Suzuhana =

Japanese musician and poet

Yuko Suzuhana 鈴華ゆう子
- Born: Mito, Ibaraki, Japan
- Genres: J-folk; J-pop; classical; rock; jazz fusion; heavy metal
- Occupations: Singer; composer; lyricist; pianist; poet
- Instruments: Vocals; piano
- Years active: 2010–present
- Labels: Avex Trax (2014–2019); Universal Sigma (2019–present)
- Website: yuko-suzuhana.com

Yuko Suzuhana (鈴華 ゆう子) (Japanese pronunciation: [sɨᵝzɨᵝha̠na̠ jɯ̟ꜜːko̞]) is a Japanese singer, Shigin master, Kenshibu master, composer, pianist, radio presenter, and cultural ambassador best known as the leader of Wagakki Band.

== Biography ==
Yuko Suzuhana began studying classical piano at the age of three, as her mother is a piano teacher, and later became a kitsuke (a kimono dresser). Her father, an architect, died when she was 19 years old. She also has a younger brother. At the age of five she began studying Shigin (poetry chanted recitation) and Kenshibu (sword and fans interpretative dancing). After graduating from Ibaraki Prefectural Mito Daini Senior High School, Suzuhana studied at the Tokyo College of Music. After working as pianist and lecturer in a piano class, she started singing in the classical pop unit Asty, formed with her pianist and violinist classmates at the university.

In 2011, Suzuhana won the grand prize in the Youth Division of the National Ginpo Concours sponsored by Nippon Columbia. In February 2012, Suzuhana co-founded the folk-classical band Hanafugetsu with shakuhachi player Daisuke Kaminaga and koto player Kiyoshi Ibukuro. A year later, she conceived a band that fused the traditional and modern sides of Japanese culture, leading to the formation of Wagakki Band.

In 2016, Suzuhana released her first solo album Cradle of Eternity. In March 2017, she was appointed Ambassador in the Ibaraki and Mito prefectures. In June 2019, Suzuhana transferred her office and label from Avex Trax to Universal Music Japan. On June 28, 2021, Suzuhana announced the restart of her solo career with the music video "Campanula", which premiered on her YouTube channel on June 30.

== Personal life ==
On August 21, 2022, Suzuhana revealed that she married Wagakki Band and Hanafugetsu koto player Kiyoshi Ibukuro on March 4, 2020, and she was pregnant with their first child. She gave birth to a baby girl on November 24, being hospitalized since September 19, after a show, as Wagakki Band finished their Vocalo Zanmai 2 tour in her absence.

== Discography ==
=== Albums ===
==== Solo albums ====
Title	Album details	Peak positions
Title	Album details	JPN Oricon
Cradle of Eternity	Released: November 23, 2016; Label: Avex Trax; Formats: CD, 2CD, CD+DVD, CD+BD, digital	6
Samurai Diva	Released: October 29, 2025; Label: Nippon Columbia; Formats: CD	25

==== Asty ====
Title	Album details
Harukaze	Released: May 15, 2010; Formats: CD
Sweet Drops	Released: October 28, 2010; Formats: CD
Acoustic -Nature-	Released: April 28, 2012; Formats: CD

==== Yukari ====
Title	Album details
Biluce	Released: October 25, 2012; Formats: CD

=== Singles ===
List of singles, with selected chart positions
Title	Year	Album
"Senka no Tomoshibi"	2016	Cradle of Eternity
"Campanula"	2021	Non-album single

=== Collaborations ===
List of singles, with selected chart positions
Title	Year	Album	Notes
"The Battle of the Monkey and the Crab"	2025	Non-album single	Duet with Hiroki Hokama of Orange Range

=== Videos ===
Title	Album details
Yuko Suzuhana Rockin' Birthday 2024: Cradle of Eternity	Released: January 15, 2024; Label: Universal Sigma; Formats: Blu-ray, DVD
