= Netta (name) =

Netta is a short form of many names ending -netta, including Aquanetta, Arnetta, Dawnetta, Janetta and Jenetta, as part of the largest etymological root of names with over five hundred variations, both male and female. The Hebrew name (spelled Netta or Neta) originates from the Hebrew word נטע for a plant, especially a sprout. Notable people with this name include the following:

== Given name ==
- Netta Aloni (born 1945), Israeli composer
- Netta Barzilai (born 1993), Israeli singer also known mononymously as Netta
- Netta Eames, born Ninetta Wiley, (1852–1944), American writer
- Netta Engelhardt, Israeli-American theoretical physicist
- Netta Garti (born 1980), Israeli actress
- Netta Elizabeth Gray (1913–1970), American botanist
- Netta Muskett (1887–1963), British romance novelist
- Netta Peacock (1864/7–1938), English art writer and photographer
- Netta Rheinberg (1911–2006), English cricketer, journalist and administrator
- Netta Syrett (1865–1943), English writer

== Nickname ==
- Netta Eames (1852–1944), American writer and magazine editor, early proponent of Jack London
- Johnetta Elzie (born 1989), American civil rights activist

== See also ==
- Natta (disambiguation)
- Nedda
- Nesta (disambiguation)
- Neta (disambiguation)
- Netra (disambiguation)
- Netta (disambiguation)
- Nette (disambiguation)
- Netti (name)
- Netto (surname)
- Netty (name)
- Nitta (disambiguation)
