= Netti (name) =

Netti is a feminine variant of Antoinette. Notable people with this nickname include:

== Nickname ==
- Netti Witziers-Timmer, legal name Jeannette Josephina Maria Witziers-Timmer (1923–2005), Dutch sprint runner

== Surname ==
- Francesco Netti (1832–1894), Italian painter
- Giovanni Cesare Netti (1649–1686), Italian composer
- Netti Shanker Yadav, nickname of Mettu Shanker Yadav (born 1962), Indian politician

== See also ==
- Netta (name)
- Netti (disambiguation)
- Nettie (name)
- Netto
- Netty (name)
- Nitti (disambiguation)
- Notti (disambiguation)
