= Neto (disambiguation) =

Neto is a surname. It may also refer to:

== People ==
=== Football and futsal ===
- Neto (footballer, born 1952), Brazilian footballer Luís Antônio Neto
- Neto (footballer, born 1966), Brazilian footballer and commentator José Ferreira Neto
- Neto (footballer, born 1981), Brazilian retired footballer Darcy Dolce Neto
- Neto (footballer, born 1985), Brazilian footballer Hélio Hermito Zampier Neto
- Neto (footballer, born 1989), Brazilian footballer Norberto Murara Neto
- Neto (footballer, born 2002), Brazilian footballer Antônio Fialho de Carvalho Neto
- Neto Baiano, Brazilian footballer Euvaldo José de Aguiar Neto (born 1982)
- Neto Berola, Brazilian footballer Sosthenes José Santos Salles (born 1987)
- Neto Borges, Brazilian footballer Vivaldo Borges dos Santos Neto (born 1996)
- Neto Colucci, Brazilian football and futsal coach, and former futsal player Carmine Colucci Neto (born 29 May 1975)
- Neto Costa, Brazilian footballer Arnaldo Francisco da Costa Neto (born 1997)
- Neto Guerino, Brazilian former footballer Guerino Minervino Neto (born 1950)
- Neto Maranhão, Brazilian footballer Roque Alves de Lima Neto (1984–2013)
- Neto Moura, Brazilian footballer Antônio Francisco Moura Neto (born 1996)
- Neto Pereira, Brazilian football coach and former player Leonidas Pereira Neto de Sousa (born 1979)
- Neto Pessoa, Brazilian footballer Altemir Cordeiro Pessôa Neto (born 1994)
- Neto Potiguar, Brazilian footballer Antonio Carlos da Silva Neto (born 1985)
- Neto Volpi, Brazilian football goalkeeper Alvino Volpi Neto (born 1992)
- Neto (futsal player), Brazilian futsal player Dovenir Domingues Neto (born 5 September 1981)

=== Other fields ===
- Neto Carletto, Brazilian politician Orlando Sulz de Almeida Neto (born 1996)
- Neto Furtado, known by the mononym Neto, half of the singing duo Flavel & Neto
- Neto Karfan (born 1994), Brazilian politician

== Other uses ==
- Neto (deity), an Iberian god
- Neto (suffix), a name suffix distinguishing a man from his grandfather (including a list of people with the name)
- Neto (river), Calabria, southern Italy
- Neto 1, a human gene
