= Neto =

Neto is a surname which may refer to:

== Arts and entertainment ==
- Coelho Neto (1864—1934), Brazilian writer and politician
- Dânia Neto (born 1983), Portuguese actress
- Ernesto Neto (born 1964), Brazilian visual artist
- Jandira Sassingui Neto (born 1983), Angolan singer/songwriter
- João Cabral de Melo Neto (1920–1999), Brazilian poet and diplomat
- João Neto, Brazilian sertanejo singer, half of the duo João Neto & Frederico
- Mário Cravo Neto (1947—2009), Brazilian photographer, sculptor and draughtsman
- Torquato Neto (1944–1972), Brazilian journalist, poet and songwriter

== Politics ==
- Agostinho Neto (1922–1979), first president of Angola
- Agustino Neto, Kenyan politician, lawyer, and Member of Parliament
- António Alberto Neto, Angolan politician
- Orlando Sulz de Almeida Neto (born 1996), also known as Neto Carletto, Brazilian politician
- Pitra Neto (born 1958), Angolan politician, professor and lawyer
- Raul Bragança Neto (1946–2014), prime minister of São Tomé and Príncipe
- Valdemar Costa Neto, Brazilian politician and congressman

== Sports ==
- Neto (footballer, born 1952), Brazilian footballer Luís Antônio Neto
- Neto (footballer, born 1966), Brazilian footballer and commentator José Ferreira Neto
- Neto (footballer, born 1981), Brazilian retired footballer Darcy Dolce Neto
- Neto (footballer, born 1985), Brazilian footballer Hélio Hermito Zampier Neto
- Neto (footballer, born 1989), Brazilian footballer Norberto Murara Neto
- Neto (footballer, born 2002), Brazilian footballer Antônio Fialho de Carvalho Neto
- Adauto Neto (born 1980), Brazilian footballer
- Álvaro de Miranda Neto (born 1973), Brazilian show jumping rider
- Anica Neto (born 1972), a.k.a. Nequita, Angolan Team handball player
- Antônio Braga Neto (born 1987), Brazilian mixed martial artist and grappler
- Apolônio Morais da Paixão Neto (born 1982), Brazilian footballer
- Darcy Dolce Neto (born 1981), Brazilian footballer
- Dovenir Domingues Neto (born 1981), Brazilian futsal player
- Edon Amaral Neto (born 1967), a.k.a. Edinho, Brazilian footballer
- Emanuel Neto (born 1984), Angolan basketball player
- Franco Neto (born 1966), Brazilian beach volleyball player
- Jaime Sunye Neto (born 1957), Brazilian chess Grandmaster
- João Neto (born 1981), Portuguese judoka
- José Neto (basketball) (born 1971), Brazilian basketball coach
- José Neto (footballer, born 1935) (1935-1987), Portuguese footballer
- José Rodrigues Neto (born 1949), Brazilian footballer
- Leonidas Pereira Neto (born 1979), Brazilian footballer
- Luís Carlos Novo Neto (born 1988), Portuguese footballer
- Osni Neto (born 1979), Brazilian footballer
- Otacílio Mariano Neto, (born 1982), Brazilian footballer
- Otacilio Jales da Silva Neto, (born 1984), Brazilian footballer
- Pedro Neto (born 2000), Portuguese footballer
- Raulzinho Neto (born 1992), Brazilian basketball player
- Renato Neto (born 1991), Brazilian footballer
- Rosemar Coelho Neto (born 1977), Brazilian track and field sprint athlete
- Zach Neto (born 2001), American baseball player

== Other fields ==
- Chiara Neto, Italian chemist
- Henrique Neto (born 1936), Portuguese entrepreneur, industrialist and former member of the Portuguese Parliament
- José Sebastião de Almeida Neto (1841–1920), Cardinal of the Roman Catholic Church and Patriarch of Lisbon

== See also ==
- Agenor Mafra-Neto, American chemical ecology researcher and entrepreneur
- Jovino Santos-Neto (born 1954), Brazilian American jazz musician, educator and producer
- Netto (disambiguation)
