= Nettie (name) =

Nettie is a feminine given name that is a diminutive form of Annette, Jeanette, Lynnette and Antonia. Its popularity in the United States has continually declined since its peak in the 1910s and 1920s. Notable people with this name include:

== Given name ==
- Nettie Craig Asberry (1865–1968), American educator
- Nettie Lee Benson (1905–1993), American librarian
- Nettie McKenzie Clapp (1868–1935), American politician
- Nettie Crawford, the 1962 Scripps National Spelling Bee champion
- Nettie Depp (1874–1932), American education reformer and public official
- Nettie Grooss (1905–1977), Dutch sprinter
- Nettie Jane Kennedy (1916–2002), American artist
- Nettie McBirney (1887–1982), American inventor
- Nettie Mayersohn (1926–2020), American politician
- Nettie Metcalf (1859–1945), American poultry farmer
- Nettie Leila Michel (1863–1912), American businesswoman, author and magazine editor
- Nettie Langston Napier (1861–1938), American activist
- Nettie Nielsen (born 1964), Danish badminton player
- Nettie Rosenstein (1890–1980), American fashion designer
- Nettie Stevens (1861–1912), American geneticist
- Nettie Barcroft Taylor (1914–2016), American librarian
- Nettie L. White (c. 1850–1921), American suffragist and stenographer
- Nettie Wiebe (born 1949), Canadian professor
- Nettie Wild, Canadian filmmaker
- Nettie Young (1916–2010), American artist

== Nickname/stagename ==
- Nettie Adler (1868–1950), born Henrietta Adler, English politician
- Nettie Sanford Chapin (1830–1901), born Henrietta Maria Skiff, American teacher, historian, author, newspaper publisher and suffragist
- Nettie Fowler (1835–1923), nickname of Nancy Fowler McCormick, American philanthropist
- Nettie Honeyball, pseudonym of possibly Mary Hutson, English footballer
- Nettie Cronise Lutes (1843–1923), nickname of Annette Cronise Lutes, American lawyer
- Nettie Parrish Martin (1840–1915), nom de plume of Marie Antoinette Parrish Hough Martin, American writer
- Nettie Palmer (1885–1964), nickname of Janet Gertrude Palmer, née Higgins, Australian poet and critic
- Nettie Runnals (1885–1980), nickname of Ninetta May Runnals, American academic
- Nettie Tobin (1863–1944), nickname of Esther Tobin, American Bahá'í community member

== Fictional characters ==
- Nettie Fowler, a character in Carousel (musical)

== See also ==
- Nettie (disambiguation)
- Nettle (disambiguation)
- Nette (disambiguation)
- Netti (disambiguation)
- Netti Shanker Yadav
