= Netty (name) =

Netty is a given name or nickname that has Hebrew, Latin and English derivations. It is a variant, version or derivative of many names including Anne (Hebrew), Hannah (English), Antoinette (French, Latin), Antonia (Latin), and Nanette (French, Hebrew), and Nettie (English).

== Given name ==
- Netty Herawaty (1930–1989), Indonesian actress
- Netty Kim (born 1976), Canadian figure skater
- Netty Pinna (1883–1937), Estonian actress
- Netty Probst (1903–1990), Luxembourgian lawyer
- Netty Simons (1913–1994) American musician
- Netty van Hoorn (born 1951), Dutch film director and producer
- Netty Prasetiyani (born 1969), Indonesian activist and politician

== Nickname ==
- nickname of Anna Seghers pseudonym of Anna Reiling (1900 – 1983), German writer
- nickname of Antoinette Hendrika Nijhoff-Wind (1897 - 1971), Dutch writer
- nickname of Carlina Renae White also known as Nejdra Nance (born 1987), American kidnapping victim

== See also ==
- Natty (disambiguation)
- Netta (name)
- Netti (name)
- Netto
- Netty (disambiguation)
- Nitty (disambiguation)
