= Nettl (disambiguation) =

Nettl is a surname. Notable people with the surname include:

- Paul Nettl (1889–1972) Czech-American musicologist
- Bruno Nettl (1930–2020), Czech-American ethnomusicologist and musicologist
- J. P. Nettl (1926–1968), British historian

== See also ==
- Ettl
- Nettle (disambiguation)
