= NET Television =

NET Television may refer to the following:

- ERT2, a Greek public broadcaster formerly known as Néa Ellinikí Tileórasi ("New Hellenic Television")
- Nebraska Educational Telecommunications, a public broadcasting network in Nebraska, United States
- NET Television (Malta), a television station operated by the Nationalist Party in Malta
- National Educational Television, a public broadcasting network in the United States from the 1950s - 1970s
- NET 2 Television, a television broadcaster in Ghana

== See also ==
- Net TV (disambiguation)
