= Atsugama =

Atsugama may refer to:

- The Japanese name for the Japanese maple tree Acer palmatum
- Japanese recording artist Atsugama, who specializes in the tsugaru-shamisen
