= Net TV =

Net TV may refer to:

- Internet TV, or streaming television
- Net TV (Argentina), an Argentine TV network
- NET (Indonesian TV network), an Indonesian TV network
- NET (Maltese TV channel), a Maltese TV network
- Nea Elliniki Tileorasi, now ERT2, a Greek TV network
- Net TV Nepal, a Nepalese online service
- New Evangelization Television, or NET-TV, an American Catholic TV network
- National Educational Television, an American educational TV network
- National Empowerment Television, an American conservative TV network
- Nebraska Educational Telecommunications, an American public broadcaster
- Nihon Educational Television, former name of Japanese TV network TV Asahi
- Sociedad Gestora de Televisión Net TV, a Spanish digital terrestrial TV licensee

== See also ==
- Netti (disambiguation)
- Netty (disambiguation)
- WNET, an American TV channel owned by WNET (formerly Educational Broadcasting Corporation)
