= Nette =

Nette can refer to:

== Rivers ==
- Nette (Innerste), a river in Lower Saxony, Germany, tributary to the Innerste
- Nette (Hase), a river in Lower Saxony, Germany, tributary to the Hase
- Nette (Middle Rhine), a river in Rhineland-Palatinate, Germany, tributary to the Rhine
- Nette (Lenne), a river in North Rhine-Westphalia, Germany, tributary to the Lenne
- Nette (Niers), a river in North Rhine-Westphalia, Germany, tributary to the Niers
- Nette (Alme), a river in North Rhine-Westphalia, Germany, tributary to the Alme

== Other ==
- Theodor Nette (1895 or 1896 – 1926), a Soviet diplomatic courier of NKID
- Nette Edel Pils, a German beer brand of the Koblenzer Brauerei
- Nette Kiviranta (born 2001), Finnish para-alpine skier
- Nette, a district of Bockenem, in Lower Saxony, Germany

== See also ==
- Netta (disambiguation)
- Netti (disambiguation)
- Nettie (disambiguation)
- Netty (disambiguation)
