= Nettle (disambiguation) =

Nettle refers to any of various plant species.

Nettle or nettles may also refer to:

== Creeks ==
- Nettle Creek (Grass River), a stream in New York, United States
- Nettle Creek (Mad River), a stream in Ohio, United States
- Nettle Creek, Innot Hot Springs, Queensland Australia

== Music ==
- "Nettles" (song), a 2025 song by Ethel Cain
- "Nettles", the second track of a single by Arctic Monkeys, released as Death Ramps

== People ==
- Nettles (surname), a list of people surnamed Nettles or Nettle

== Vessels ==
- HMS Nettle, various ships with the name
- USS Nettle, two ships
- USCGC Nettle (WAK-169), a United States Coast Guard coastal freighter

== Other uses ==
- Nettle (cryptographic library), a cryptographic library developed by Niels Möller in 2001
- Sea nettle, the jellyfish genus Chrysaora

== See also ==
- Nettie (disambiguation)
