= Neta =

Neta may refer to:

== People ==
- Neta Alchimister (born 1994), Israeli model
- Neta Bahcall (born 1942), American astrophysicist and cosmologist
- Neta Dobrin (born 1975), Israeli politician
- Neta Doris Neale (1904–1988), New Zealand theatre director
- Netta Garti (born 1980), Israeli actress
- Neta Harpaz (1893–1970), Israeli politician
- Neta Lohnes Frazier (1890–1990), American children's author
- Neta Maughan (born 1938), Australian piano teacher
- Neta Riskin (born 1976), Israeli actress
- Neta Rivkin (born 1991), Israeli rhythmic gymnast
- Neta Snook (1896–1991), American aviator
- Rui Neta (born 1997), Portuguese footballer
- Subhas Chandra Bose (1897-1945), leader of the Indian independence movement, known as Neta Ji (lit. 'leader')

== Places ==
- Neta, Cyprus
- Neta, Israel
- Neta, Nepal (disambiguation)

== Organizations ==
- International Electrical Testing Association (formerly the National Electrical Testing Association)
- Ñetas, a Puerto Rican prison gang
- National Educational Telecommunications Association, educational television show distributor usually in cooperation with American Public Television
- New Electricity Trading Arrangements, the UK wholesale electricity market trading arrangements as of 27 March 2001

== Other uses ==
- Neta, the ingredient which tops the mound of rice on a piece of nigirizushi
- Neta Hebrew (No'ar leTovat ha'Ivrit), literally Youth in Favour of Hebrew, a Hebrew language curriculum for students
- No Electronic Theft Act, a 1997 US law providing criminal penalties for online copyright infringement

== Brand ==
- Neta (car marque), an automotive brand of Hozon Auto.

== See also ==
- Netta (disambiguation)
- Netaji (disambiguation)
