= Netto =

Netto in some European languages means net worth, net pay, or net weight. It may also refer to:

== Arts and entertainment ==
- Ambiguous (film), also known as Waisetsu Netto Shūdan Ikasete!!, a 2003 Japanese Pink film
- Netto (film), a 2005 film set in Berlin
- Netto Hikari, Japanese given name for the Mega Man Battle Network character Lan Hikari
- Netto Houz, Berlin-based house music project
- Netto Koshien, Japanese television program
- Net Yaroze, known as Netto Yarōze in Japanese, a development kit for the PlayStation video game console

== Companies ==
- Netto Marken-Discount, a German supermarket chain owned by Edeka
- Netto (France), a French supermarket chain owned by Les Mousquetaires
- Netto (Denmark), a Danish discount supermarket owned by Salling Group operating in Denmark, Germany, Poland
  - Netto UK, a United Kingdom discount supermarket chain which was a 50:50 joint venture between Dansk Supermarked A/S and J Sainsbury plc
- Nettó (Iceland), an Icelandic supermarket chain owned by Samskaupa

== Places ==
- Estádio Municipal João Lamego Netto, a multi-purpose stadium in Ipatinga, Brazil
- Governor Bento Munhoz da Rocha Netto Hydroelectric Plant in Paraná, Brazil
- Netto Arena, an indoor arena in Szczecin, Poland

== Other ==
- Austria Netto Katalog, Austrian collectors' catalog
- Netto (surname)
- Netto-uyoku, term used to refer to netizens who espouse right wing views on Japanese social media

== See also ==
- Neto (disambiguation)
- Netta (disambiguation)
- Netti (disambiguation)
- Netty (disambiguation)
