= Ettel =

Ettel is a German surname. Notable people with the surname include:

- Friedrich Ettel (1890–1941), Swiss actor
- Wolf-Udo Ettel (1921–1943), German World War II pilot

== See also ==
- Ettl
