= Nethy =

Nethy may refer to:

- Nethy Bridge, village in Strathspey in the Highland council area of Scotland
- River Nethy, right bank tributary of the River Spey

== See also ==
- Netty (disambiguation)
