= Ki&Ki =

Tsugaru-shamisen duo band in Japan

- Origin: Japan
- Genres: Min'yō, pop
- Years active: 2008–present
- Label: JVCKenwood Victor Entertainment
- Members: Hikari Shirafuji; Kanami Takeda
- Website: www.shamisenkiki.com

Ki&Ki (KiKi) is a tsugaru-shamisen duo band based in Tokyo, Japan, consisting of Hikari Shirafuji and Kanami Takeda. Originally formed in 2008, the group is known for competing in and winning multiple national competitions in Japan, such as the All-Japan Tsugaru Shamisen Competition in Nagoya. Performances from the duo include traditional pieces as well as popular music.

In February 2019, the duo was recognized by the Cabinet Secretariat (Japan) and certified under the beyond2020 Program on the basis of the cultural value of their performance as well as for disseminating traditional Japanese music abroad.

== History ==
While currently based in Tokyo, Shirafuji grew up in Hyōgo Prefecture whereas Takeda grew up in Aichi Prefecture. The two initially met at national tsugaru-shamisen competitions in Japan. Both performers attended university in Tokyo in 2008, and during that year, Shirafuji and Takeda officially formed Ki&Ki.

The group's name is written in Japanese as 輝&輝, and pronounced "ki ki." The kanji 輝 means "to shine." In an interview, when asked why they chose the name, Shirafuji explained that she and Takeda have very different playing styles due to their background and training. The performers compare these differences as representing different "colors" to how they play their instruments, and that in combining them together, the music has a bright and shiny quality.

In September 2020, The Guardian reported that Ki&Ki had been partnering with Canadian performer and YouTuber Norm Nakamura to organize tsugaru-shamisen concerts internationally, in an effort to revive and popularize the instrument and specific style of performance. They also planned to work together to initiate an online training course on shamisen performance.

== Awards ==
- Hikari Shirafuji
  - 2002 Tsugaru Shamisen Hirosaki National Tournament Junior Class Champion
  - 2004 Tsugaru Shamisen Hirosaki National Tournament C-class victory
  - 2007 Tsugaru Shamisen Hirosaki National Tournament Women's Class A Winner
  - 2008, Tsugaru Shamisen Hirosaki National Tournament Women's Class A Champion [2 consecutive victories]
  - 2009 Tsugaru Shamisen Kyushu Tournament in Yatsushiro Grand Prix Championship
  - 2010 Tsugaru Shamisen Hirosaki National Tournament Women's Class A Winner
  - 2010 National Tsugaru Shamisen Competition Nagoya Tournament General A-class victory
  - 2010 Tsugaru Shamisen National Tournament in Kobe General Division
  - 2013, 7th Tsugaru Shamisen Japan's No. 1 deciding match 3rd place
- Kanami Takeda
  - 2006 Tsugaru Shamisen National Tournament in Kobe General Women's Division
  - 2006 National Tsugaru Shamisen Competition General Women's Division Winner
  - In 2007, the 1st Tsugaru Shamisen Japan's No. 1 deciding match general women's division championship
  - 2009, National Tsugaru Shamisen Competition Nagoya Tournament General A class runner-up
  - 2010, Tsugaru Shamisen All Japan Kanagi Tournament General Division A Class 2nd Place
  - 2010, National Tsugaru Shamisen Competition Nagoya Tournament General A class runner-up
  - 2011 Tsugaru Shamisen All Japan Kanagi Tournament General Division A-class victory

== Discography ==
=== CDs ===
- 2GIRL SHAMISEN (2012)
- 輝&輝の芽 (2013)
- 開華宣言 (2015)
- ききくらべCD（No.1〜No.4） (2016)
- 輝&輝の実 (2017)
- 輝&輝の樹 (2017) （※輝&輝バンド名義）
- LOOP LOOP LOOP (2019)

=== DVDs ===
- 開華宣言 in TIAT SKY HALL Concert Selection (2016)

輝&輝バンド
