= Nitto =

Nitto or Nittō or variant may refer to:

- Nitto Boseki, Tokyo-based manufacturer of textile and fiberglass products
- Nitto Denko, corporation producing insulators, tapes, films, LCDs; sponsor of the year-end ATP Finals tennis championship.
- Nitto Tire, tire company bought by Toyo
- Nitto Records, Japanese record company
- Nittō Aviation, predecessor to Japan Domestic Airlines
- Nitto, Japanese model manufacturer, see List of model car brands
- nittō guhō junreikōki, Japanese name of the Ennin's Diary
- Nitto Co. Ltd., Japanese manufacturer of bicycle parts
- Nitto Kogyo Co. Ltd., Japanese manufacturer of filters for cars

People

- Frank Nitti, aka Francesco Raffaele Nitto (1886–1943), a mafia enforcer

== See also ==
- Nitty (disambiguation)
- Nitti (disambiguation)
- Nitta (disambiguation)
