= Nitty =

Nitty may refer to:

== Nitty ==
- Nitty (musician), American male pop-rap artist
- Nitty Scott, MC, American female singer
- Nitty Singh, New York Buzz tennis team owner
- Nitty Kutchie, reggae singer Riddim Driven: Blindfold
- "Flip and Nitty", song by Phil Spector Zip-a-Dee-Doo-Dah

== See also ==
- Netty (disambiguation)
- Nitta (disambiguation)
- Nittei
- Nitti (disambiguation)
- Nitto (disambiguation)
- Nitty-gritty (disambiguation)
