= Nitta Station =

Nitta Station is the name of multiple train stations in Japan.

- Nitta Station (Fukushima) - (新田駅) in Fukushima Prefecture
- Nitta Station (Miyagi) - (新田駅) in Miyagi Prefecture

== See also ==
- Musashi-Nitta Station - (武蔵新田駅), on the Tokyu Tamagawa Line in Ōta, Tokyo, Japan
- Izu-Nitta Station - (伊豆仁田駅), in Kannami, Shizuoka Prefecture, Japan
- Nitta (disambiguation)
