= Nittei =

Nittei may refer to:

Nittei Maru (the ship "Nittei")

- Nittei Maru, sunk January 1945, see List of shipwrecks in January 1945
- Nittei Maru, sunk May 1945, see List of shipwrecks in May 1945

== See also ==
- Nitte, village in India
- Nitty (disambiguation)
- Nitti (disambiguation)
