= Netty =

Netty may refer to:

- Netty (software), a Java project
- North East England (Geordie) dialect for toilet or public convenience
- Netty (name)

== See also ==
- Westoe Netty
- Nethy (disambiguation)
- Natty (disambiguation)
- Netta (disambiguation)
- Netti (disambiguation)
- Netto (disambiguation)
- Nettie (disambiguation)
- Nitty (disambiguation)
- Nutty
