= Neta, Nepal =

Neta, Nepal may refer to:

- Neta, Bheri
- Neta, Gandaki
- Neta, Lumbini
