= Neti =

Neti can refer to:

- Neti (mythology), an underworld god in Mesopotamian mythology
- Neti (Hatha Yoga) a Hatha Yoga technique for cleansing air passageways in the head
  - Neti pot, or Jala neti, a device used for nasal irrigation
- Neti neti, a chant or mantra in Hinduism, and in particular Jnana Yoga and Advaita Vedanta
- Neti, an alien race in Star Wars
- NETI, a native name of Novosibirsk State Technical University

== See also ==
- Netti (disambiguation)
