= Rui Neta =

Portuguese footballer

Personal information
- Full name: Rui Filipe Santos Neta
- Date of birth: 21 February 1997 (age 29)
- Place of birth: Póvoa de Varzim, Portugal
- Height: 1.70 m (5 ft 7 in)
- Position: Midfielder

Team information
- Current team: Cerveira
- Number: 20

Youth career
- 2007–2016: Varzim

Senior career*
Years	Team	Apps	(Gls)
2016–2018	Varzim B	15	(2)
2016–2018	Varzim	10	(0)
2017	→ Salgueiros (loan)	6	(0)
2018–2019	Portimonense B	26	(0)
2019–	Cerveira	9	(0)
- * Club domestic league appearances and goals as of 00:41, 30 November 2019 (UTC)

Rui Filipe Santos Neta (born 21 February 1997) is a Portuguese footballer who plays for C.D. Cerveira as a midfielder.

== Career ==
Neta was born in Póvoa de Varzim. On 6 August 2016, he made his professional debut with Varzim in a 2016–17 LigaPro match against Gil Vicente.
