= Notti =

Notti may refer to:

- a type of tteok in Korean cuisine
- a surname; notable people with the name include:
  - Emil Notti (born 1933), American engineer, activist and politician
  - Emilio Notti (1891–1982), Italian painter

== See also ==
- Netti (disambiguation)
