= Nitta Oyako =

Japanese shamisen music duo

Nitta Oyako (新田親子) is a father-son shamisen duo from Japan. (Oyako means "parent and child" in Japanese.) Nitta Hiroshi and Nitta Masahiro specialize in Tsugaru shamisen, a fast-paced style of shamisen playing originating in Hokkaido, where the two men are from. Nitta Hiroshi, the father, trained and coached Nitta Masahiro when he was a teenager. Nitta Masahiro eventually won several national Japanese competitions. The duo has produced three albums and gone on several Japanese and international tours. They play traditional songs, original compositions, and some contemporary pop music.
