= Ettl =

Ettl is a surname. Notable people with the surname include:

- Harald Ettl (born 1947), Austrian politician
- Helmut Ettl (born 1965), Austrian economist
- Karl Ettl (1899–1956), Austrian operatic bass singer
- Katherine Ettl (1911–1993), American sculptor

== See also ==
- Ettel
