= Nitta =

Nitta may refer to:

== Places ==
- Nitta, Sweden, a locality in Ulricehamn Municipality, Västra Götaland County of Sweden
- Nitta, Gunma; a.k.a. Nitta, Nitta, Gunma, Japan. A town in the district of Nitta of the prefecture of Gunma in Japan
- Nitta District, Gunma; a.k.a. Nitta, Gunma, Japan. A district in the prefecture of Gunma in Japan

== People ==
- Nitta clan (新田氏), a major noble family in medieval Japan
  - Minamoto no Yoshishige a.k.a. Nitta Tarō (1135–1202), founder of the Nitta clan
  - Nitta Yoshisada (1301–1338), samurai commander
  - Nitta Yoshiaki (died 1337), samurai
  - Nitta Yoshioki (died 1358), samurai
  - Nitta Yoshimune (1335–1368), samurai commander
  - Nitta Yoshisuke (1305–1340), samurai
- Nitta Oyako (Hiroshi and Masahiro), Japanese music act
- Akeomi Nitta (born 1973), Japanese kickboxer
- Daisuke Nitta (born 1980), Japanese football player
- Emi Nitta (born 1985), Japanese voice actress
- Eri Nitta (born 1968), Japanese singer
- Sandra Nitta (born 1949), American swimmer
- Youka Nitta (born 1971), Japanese yaoi manga artist
- Yudai Nitta (born 1986), Japanese track cyclist

== Characters ==
- Kazuya Nitta, a character in Ginban Kaleidoscope
- Shun Nitta, a character in Captain Tsubasa

== Other ==
- Nitta Station, multiple train stations in Japan
- Nitta Maru (the ship "Nitta"), former name of the Japanese aircraft carrier Chūyō

== See also ==
- Netta (disambiguation)
- Nitto (disambiguation)
- Nitti (disambiguation)
