= Tsugaru-jamisen =

Japanese genre of Shamisen music

- Stylistic origins: Min'yō
- Cultural origins: Early 19th–late 20th century, Tsugaru, Japan
- Typical instruments: Shamisen

Local scenes
- Tsugaru, Kanagi, Hirosaki

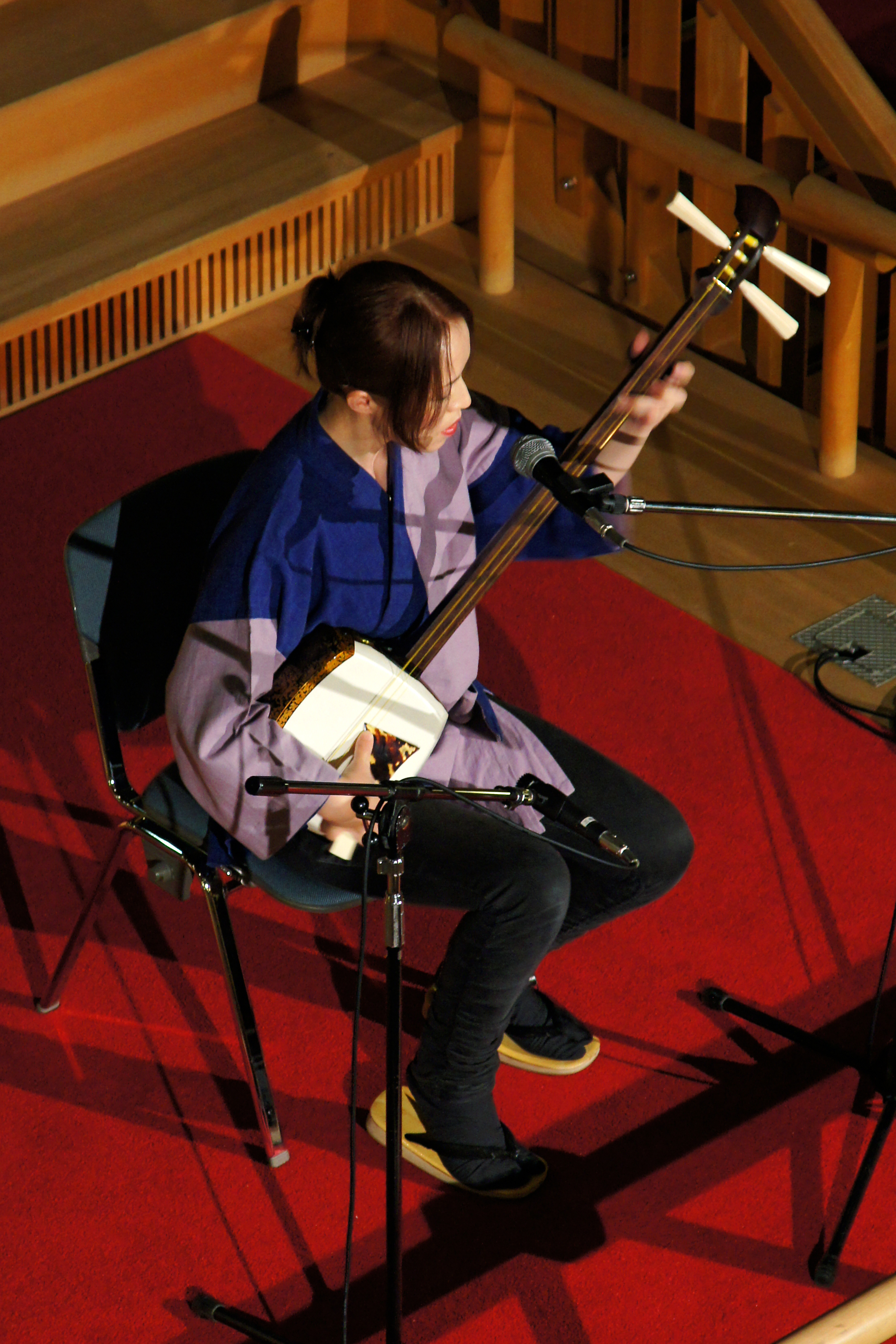
A tsugaru-jamisen player

Tsugaru-jamisen (津軽三味線, つがるじゃみせん) or Tsugaru-shamisen (つがるしゃみせん) refers to both the Japanese genre of shamisen music originating from the Tsugaru Peninsula in present-day Aomori Prefecture and the instrument it is performed with. It is performed throughout Japan, though associations with the Tsugaru remain strong. Tsugaru-jamisen is considered the most recognized genre of shamisen music, and has enjoyed multiple periods of popularity in Japan.

== History ==
While it is clear that the shamisen originated from China through Okinawa in the 16th century CE, the specific developers of tsugaru-jamisen are not known with certainty, largely because written records of its development were not kept, nor did the Japanese government formally recognize it. What is known is that tsugaru-jamisen originated from a small peninsula due west of present-day Aomori Prefecture called Tsugaru. In addition, some researchers have conjectured the style's origins based on available evidence. Some consensus is that the style was developed by homeless and blind individuals called bosama.

One scholar, Daijō Kazuo, proposed that the genre originated from a bosama named Nitabō based on interviews with musicians and their families. According to his research, Nitabō acquired and modified a shamisen in 1877, for which he adopted a different playing style. Nitabō rounded off the plectrum of the instrument such that it was shaped like a rice paddle. In addition, he adopted a playing style with the shamisen held upright, included the area around the bridge as the playing area, and incorporated beating and slapping the strings in contrast to exclusive use of the plectrum. However, other scholars, such as Gerald Groemer, argue that the account advanced by Kazuo may not be entirely accurate due to a lack of documentation.

Nitabō had multiple blind students, such as Kinobo and Chōsakubo, who contributed to the development of the style. Nitabō's last student, Shirakawa Gunpachirō, performed outside of the Tsugaru region as a part of a folk performance troupe. Gunpachirō also performed in professional settings, such as in concert halls in Tokyo. As a result of his successes, tsugaru-jamisen became popular in the 1920s, but its popularity waned with the onset of the Second Sino-Japanese War later in the decade.

During 1955–1965, a number of genre performers moved to urban centers in Japan, such as Tokyo. This migration was part of a larger movement due to a boom in the traditional arts in Japan. Tsugaru-jamisen enjoyed another bout of popularity when Gunpachirō performed with enka star Michiya Mihashi at the Nihon Theater in Tokyo in 1959. As a result of this mass exposure to the genre, younger practitioners emerged. Takahashi Chikuzan, also a bosama, was a highly regarded practitioner of the genre and began touring Japan in 1964.

== Composition ==
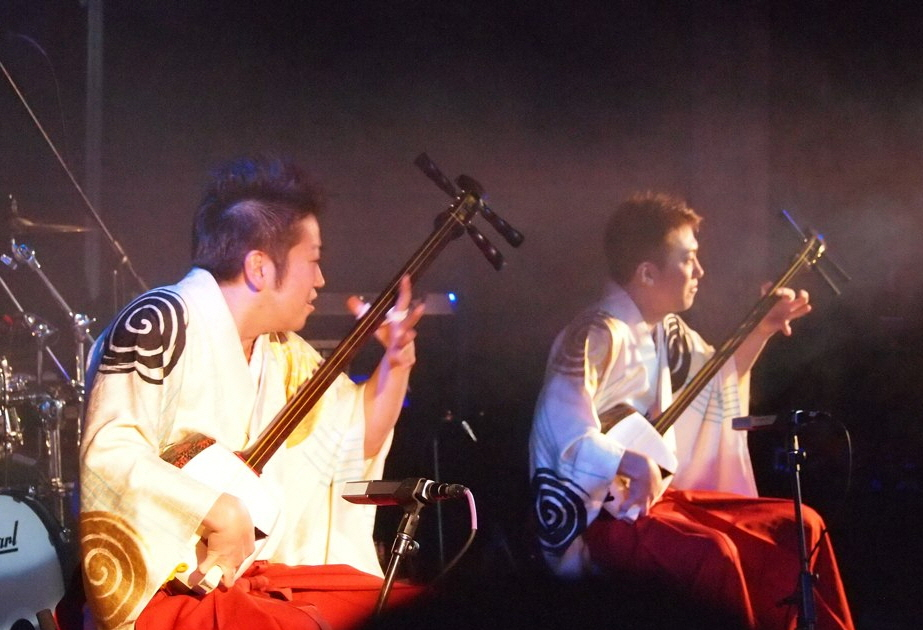
The Yoshida Brothers performing in concert at Webster Hall in November 2012

Tsugaru-jamisen is played on a larger shamisen called futozao (太棹) with a thicker neck and thicker strings than those used for most other styles. Tsugaru-jamisen is easy recognizable by its percussive quality (the plectrum striking the instrument's body on each stroke) and the lilt of the rhythms performed. Unlike most other Japanese music, some tsugaru-jamisen pieces are in triple time, though the three beats are not accentuated in the manner of Western music.

Tsugaru-shamisen has a large and steadily growing repertoire. Interviews with noted performers such as Takahashi Chikuzan and Yamada Chisato, as well as recordings issued by past stars, allow one to produce the following table. Most of the titles given below exist in two versions: in song form (a vocal line with shamisen and taiko drum accompaniment) and as a solo shamisen piece (see sixth group below). Recently, younger performers have been attempting to combine tsugaru-shamisen playing styles or motives with jazz, rock, and other forms of more commercial music. With the exception of arrangements classified as shin min'yō, these pieces are usually considered to be traditional.

== The tsugaru-jamisen repertoire ==
- A. Kudoki bushi (quasi-narrative songs)
  - Suzuki Mondo, now rarely played
  - Jonkara kudoki, now rarely played
- B. Tsugaru (no) mitsumono ("Three tsugaru songs")
  - Tsugaru jongara bushi
    - shin bushi ("new song")
    - naka bushi ("middle song")
    - kyū bushi ("old song")
    - shin kyū bushi ("new old song")
  - Tsugaru yosare bushi
    - shin bushi ("new song")
    - kyū bushi ("old song")
  - Tsugaru ohara bushi
    - shin bushi ("new song")
    - kyū bushi ("old song")
- C. Tsugaru (no) itsutsumono ("Five Tsugaru Songs"—the "Three Tsugaru Songs" above, plus the following two)
  - Tsugaru aiya bushi
  - Tsugaru san-sagari
- D. Kyū min'yō ("old folk songs")
  - Yasaburō bushi
  - Tsugaru jinku
  - Dodarebachi
  - Ajigasawa jinku
  - Tosa no sunayama
  - Tsugaru ondo
  - Torajōsama
  - Tanto Bushi
  - Others
- E. Shin min'yō ("new folk songs")
  - Waiha bushi (composed in 1932 by the singer Narita Unchiku (1888–1974))
  - Ringo bushi (composed by Narita Unchiku in 1954)
  - Others
- F. Kyokubiki (shamisen solos and improvisation): potentially all songs of B, C, D, and E (most commonly B), as well as free improvisation, freely entitled by performers.
  - Iwaki (Takahashi Chikuzan)
  - Arashi (Yamada Chisato)
  - Others, etc.
- G. Gassō (ensemble playing of multiple shamisen, occasionally supplemented by other instruments such as percussion, taishō-goto, koto, etc.; also referred to as kyoku-awase. Most often versions of Jonkara bushi are used; sometimes other songs of groups B to E above; and occasionally newly composed pieces or free improvisation on standard patterns.)

== Playing method ==
The tsugaru-jamisen is characterized by multiple distinct phrases and styles. In acrobatic technique (kyokubiki), improvising is the feature. The player often strikes the strings and skin hard and fast with the bachi. They use only the left index and ring finger traditionally, and the scale is pentatonic (do re mi sol la). In recent years, a technique unique to the tsugaru-jamisen style is the tremolo played with the back of the bachi without hitting the skin.

== Discussion of the repertoire ==
Group A presents songs that are only rarely heard today, though they were once the mainstay of the repertoire of itinerant, often blind, musician-beggars known as bosama. At the start of the 20th century, these kudoki were gradually displaced by shorter non-narrative songs. The bosama (and, in time, other performers) tended to concentrate their efforts on some five favorite songs (Group C). By the middle of the 20th century, three songs (Group B) and their shamisen versions had become the core of the Tsugaru-shamisen repertoire, which they remain today. Indeed, "Jonkara bushi"—in a version that the old bosama would probably not even recognize—has today become virtually a symbol of the timeless "spirit of Tsugaru."

The songs of group D—though no less traditional than those of groups A, B, and C—were not, it seems, a major part of the bosama repertoire. Instead, they tended to be sung by non-professionals, generally without shamisen accompaniment. But these songs began to receive renewed attention with the Tsugaru-shamisen "boom" after World War II. Shamisen accompaniments were composed or arranged by such performers as Takahashi Chikuzan (Takahashi 1976:142). Somewhat earlier, there had been a nationwide movement to produce "new folk songs" (see Hughes 1985:144-54, 281–309; Kojima 1970), resulting in the songs listed in Group E. More recently, solo shamisen versions of the songs of Group D have been arranged. Solo versions of the older songs have become the center of the repertoire, leading to the development of long solo improvisations (Group F) and ensemble playing (Group G).

One of the most interesting characteristics of the Tsugaru-shamisen repertoire is what might be termed its cumulative nature. As seen from the listing of songs in Group B, newer versions of songs tend to coexist alongside older versions, rather than replacing them. Although the older songs and their shamisen accompaniments or shamisen solo versions have no doubt themselves been somewhat transformed from what they were decades ago (and they of course were never an entirely uniform to begin with), it remains certain that the "old," "middle," and "new" versions are differentiated not merely stylistically but also historically. Their structural differences contain, as it were, a congealed history.

== Notable players ==
- Yoshida Brothers
- Shirakawa Gunpachirō
- Takahashi Chikuzan
- Kida Rinshōe
- Fukushi Masakatsu
- Oyama Mitsugu
- Mihashi Michiya
- Yamada Chisato
- Shibutani Kazuo
- Hiromitsu Agatsuma
- Shin'ichi Kinoshita
- Michihiro Sato
- Kevin Kmetz
- Kyle Abbott
- Masahiro Nitta
- Mike Penny
- Mitsuou Oyama
- Mitsugu Oyama
- Yutaka Oyama
- Shamimaster Shishido(Kouzan Oyama)
- Yoshikazu Oyama
- Seiyu Oyama
- Nitta Oyako
- Chie Hanawa
- Ki&Ki – Kanami and Hikari
- Beni Ninagawa (Wagakki Band)
- Shinobu Kawashima
- Noriko Tadano
- Hibiki Ichikawa

== Main style ==
- Oyama Ryu
- Sawada Ryu

== References and further reading ==
Daijō Kazuo
Daijō has spent most of his life studying The Tsugaru-Shamisen and has met a number of the old bosama. His writings, often in semi-novelistic form, emphasize that everything originated with one "Nitabō". Most scholars reject this unilinear derivation of the genre.

- 1984 Genkon Tsugaru-shamisen. Gōdō Shuppan.
- 1986 "Tsugaru-shamisen no rekishi: sono seishin to fūdo". In Tsugaru-shamisen taizen (6 cassettes and book). Tokyo: King Records K25H-5274-8.
- 1995 Tsugaru-shamisen no tanjo: minzoku geinō no seisei to ryūsei. Tokyo Shin'yosha.

Groemer, Gerald

- 1991 The Autobiography of Takahashi Chikuzan: Adventures of a Tsugaru-jamisen musician. Warren Michigan: Harmonie Park Press.
- 1993 "Tsugaru-jamisen ni okeru sokkyō ensōteki yōso no bunseki." Tōyō ongaku kenkyū 57:41–61.
- 1999 The Spirit of Tsugaru: Blind Musicians, Takahashi Chikuzan, and the Folk Music of Northern Japan. Warren, Michigan: Harmonie Park Press. 321 pp., illust., biblio.
- 2012 The Spirit of Tsugaru: Blind Musicians, Takahashi Chikuzan, and the Folk Music of Northern Japan, 2nd revised edition. Hirosaki: Tsugaru Shobō. 369 pp., illust., photographs, biblio.

The new edition includes a good deal of newly discovered historical information and brings the volume up to date. Currently only available from amazon.co.jp, it remains the most detailed study of Tsugaru-shamisen to date in any language. Includes a translation of Takahashi Chikuzan's autobiography (Takahashi 1976)

Hughes, David

- 1985 The Heart's Home Town: Traditional Folk Song in Modern Japan. PhD dissertation, University of Michigan.

(introduction to Japanese folk song in general).

Johnson, Henry

- 2010 The shamisen: Tradition and diversity. Leiden/Boston: Brill. ISBN 978 90 04 18137 3

Kimura Genzō

- 1974 "Tsugaru-shamisen no keifu (1–24)", Tōō Nippō, Oct.16-Dec.14.

Kojima Tomiko

- 1970 "Shin-min'yō undō no ongakushi-teki igi". Engekigaku 11:1–29.

(Study of the "new folk song" movement)

Matsuno Takeo

- 1935 "Tsugaru min'yō-shi". Kyōdo-shi Mutsu 1:90–118; 3:115–157; 4:93–112.

Suda Naoyuki and Anthony Rausch

- 1998 The Birth of Tsugaru Shamisen Music. Aomori: Aomori University Press.

(Abridged translation of Daijō 1995 and includes some more general anthropological material).

Takahashi Chikuzan

- 1973 Tsugaru-shamisen Takahashi Chikuzan (liner notes). Tokyo: CBS Sony SODL 17.
- 1976 Jiden: Tsugaru-shamisen hitori tabi. Tokyo: Shinshokan.

(Autobiography of one of the Tsugaru-shamisen greats of the past. Translated in Groemer 1991, 1999, and 2012).
