= Neto Maranhão =

Brazilian footballer (1984–2013)

Personal information
- Full name: Roque Alves de Lima Neto
- Date of birth: 8 January 1984
- Place of birth: São Domingos, Brazil
- Date of death: 9 January 2013 (aged 29)
- Place of death: Mossoró, Rio Grande do Norte, Brazil
- Height: 1.85 m (6 ft 1 in)
- Position: Midfielder

Youth career
- CRB

Senior career*
Years	Team	Apps	(Gls)
2006–2008	Maranhão		
2009	Petrolina		
2009	Santa Cruz		
2009	→ Campinense (loan)	13	(0)
2010	Monte Azul	0	(0)
2010	América-MG	7	(0)
2011	Salgueiro	2	(0)
2012	Coríntians-RN		
2012	Treze	0	(0)
2013	Potiguar		
Total		22	(0)
- * Club domestic league appearances and goals

Roque Alves de Lima Neto (8 January 1984 – 9 January 2013), commonly known as Neto Maranhão, was a Brazilian footballer. He died after suffering a heart attack during training.

== Career statistics ==
=== Club ===
Club	Season	League			State League		Cup		Other		Total	
Club	Season	Division	Apps	Goals	Apps	Goals	Apps	Goals	Apps	Goals	Apps	Goals
Maranhão	2008	–			0	0	1 (Note: Appearances in the Copa do Brasil)	0	0	0	1	0
Campinense (loan)	2009	Série B	13	0	0	0	0	0	0	0	13	0
Monte Azul	2010	–			3 (Note: Appearances in the Campeonato Paulista)	0	0	0	0	0	3	0
América-MG	2010	Série B	7	0	0	0	0	0	0	0	7	0
Salgueiro	2011	Série B	2	0	7 (Note: Appearances in the Campeonato Pernambucano)	0	0	0	0	0	9	0
Treze	2012	Série C	0	0	0	0	1	0	0	0	1	0
Career total			22	0	10	0	2	0	0	0	34	0
