= Jandira Sassingui Neto =

Angolan singer and songwriter (born 1983)

- Also known as: Pearl
- Born: 1983 (age 41–42); Huambo, Angola
- Occupation(s): Singer, songwriter

Jandira Sassingui Neto (born 28 April 1983) is an Angolan singer and songwriter. She was born in Huambo province situated in the Central Region of Angola and is better known by her stage name Pearl.

== Early life ==
Born in Huambo province in 1983, Pearl is the daughter of a mother who is a medical doctor. Her father is a lawyer and musician. Her father, Manuel Sassingui (now deceased) was part of the musical group Stars of the South. At the age of nine, with his mother and three brothers, their family had to move from Huambo to Luanda because of the Angolan Civil War. A few years later, they went to Windhoek, the capital of Namibia. She studied law at the University of Pretoria, South Africa.

== Career ==
She had the first great opportunity in the world of music in Pretoria, inspired by the talent show Coca-Cola Pop Stars. She took part in the contest but would eventually be disqualified for not being South African. She has since become a popular singer and has performed in Angola and Portugal.

== Personal life ==
She has a daughter, Valentine, with Sérgio Neto, executive director of Semba Comunicação.
