= Nitti =

Nitti may refer to one or more of the following:

- Craig Nitti (born 1992), a retired American soccer player
- Francesco Fausto Nitti (1899–1974), Italian anti-fascist journalist
- Francesco Saverio Nitti (1868–1953), Italian prime minister, economist and politician
- Frank Nitti (1896–1943), an American mobster in Al Capone's gang
  - Nitti: The Enforcer (1988), biopic of Frank Nitti
- Nitti (DJ), American electronic music producer, formerly known as Nitti Gritti
- Nitti (producer), American rapper and producer

== See also ==
- Netti (disambiguation)
- James Nitties
- Nitta (disambiguation)
- Nittei
- Nitto (disambiguation)
- Nitty (disambiguation)
