= Nesta =

Nesta or NESTA may refer to:

- Nesta (charity), an innovation charity in the UK, formerly the National Endowment for Science, Technology and the Arts (NESTA)
- Nesta (gastropod), a genus of gastropods

== People ==
- Alessandro Nesta (born 1976), Italian footballer and manager
- Nesta Maude Ashworth (1893–1982) British Girl Guide
- Nesta Carter (born 1985), Jamaican sprinter
- Nesta Guinness-Walker (born 1999), English footballer
- Nesta Piper (born 1982), Montserratian cricketer
- Nesta Roberts (1913–2009), Welsh journalist
- Nest ferch Rhys (c. 1085–before 1136), also known as Princess Nesta, daughter of Rhys ap Tewdwr
- Nesta Toumine (1912–1996), dancer, choreographer, artistic director and teacher in Canada
- Nesta Helen Webster (1876–1960), British historian, occultist and author
- Agnes Nesta Skrine (1864–1955), pseudonym of the Irish-Canadian poet Agnes Shakespeare Higginson
- Robert Nesta Marley (1945–1981), better known as Bob Marley

== See also ==
- Netta (disambiguation)
