= Nettles (surname) =

Nettles or Nettle is a locational surname of British origin, which means a person from a place overgrown with nettles. The name may refer to:

- Bea Nettles (born 1946), American photographer
- Bill Nettles (born 1961), American lawyer
- Bob Nettle (1924–2019), American politician
- Bonnie Nettles (1928–1985), American cult founder
- Clem Nettles (1930–2010), American farmer and politician
- Doug Nettles (born 1951), American football player
- Geoffrey Nettle (born 1950), Australian judge
- Graig Nettles (born 1944), American baseball player
- Jennifer Nettles (born 1974), American singer
- Jim Nettles (born 1947), American baseball player
- Jim Nettles (football player) (born 1942), American football player
- John Nettles (born 1943), British actor
- Kerry Nettle (born 1973), Australian politician
- Morris Nettles (1952–2017), American baseball player
- Ray Nettles (1949–2009), American football player
- Stephen Nettles (1595–1647), British Anglican priest

== See also ==
- Kopřiva, a Czech surname meaning nettle
- Janet Nettles, a character in Scooby-Doo! Mystery Incorporated
