= Netta Peacock =

Netta (Picomette) Peacock (born 1864/7 Sunderland – 1938), was an English art writer and photographer who became involved in Russian art circles during the fin de siecle. Peacock wrote about Russian traditional crafts and artwork and published several books about Western painters. Netta Peacock's photographic works form a remarkable record of pre-revolutionary Russia, documenting different classes of society. Little is known about the photographer herself; she was the daughter of Sunderland ship broker Reginald Peacock and his Dutch wife Jacoba, and close friends with artists Maria Vasilievna Yakunchikova and Yelena Dmitrievna Polenova. A collection of her photographs is held by The Victoria and Albert Museum, London. Her sister Siegwardine (née Clark) was also a photographer.
