= Francisco Correa Netto =

17th century Portuguese sexton

Francisco Correa Netto (17th century) was a sexton in Portugal whose gay love letters are the earliest surviving examples in a modern language.

Correa Netto was a sexton at the Silves Cathedral. He exchanged several explicitly homosexual love letters with the musician and instrument maker Manuel Viegas who also worked at the Cathedral. Five of the letters have been preserved.

Out of apparent jealousy, as Correa Netto allegedly wanted to get engaged to a woman, his former lover presented the letters to the vicar of Silves. The letters were given to the Inquisition in Évora on March 29, 1664. Several witnesses testified that Correa Netto was a "sodomite" and the content of the letters was cited as evidence. However Correa Netto was neither arrested nor summoned. It was thought that letters alone were insufficient evidence, as long as no anal sex act could be proven.

The letters that have survived paint a picture of homophile love and graphic homosexuality.

Señor Manoel Viegas: If men sleep with me, it is not to find a pussy. They place the cock between my legs, and there they have their way. I do not achieve it. If Your Grace [Vossa Merce] would wish the same, dispose of me, I am at your service, to whom I swear unto death, to offer what is needed, and the losses are mine.

— (Translation) Francisco Correa Netto, c. March 1664
