= Nettle Creek (Mad River tributary) =

Coordinates: 40°4′13″N 83°48′36″W

Nettle Creek is a stream located entirely within the borders of Champaign County, Ohio. The 11.5-mile (18.5 km) long stream is a tributary of the Mad River.

Nettle Creek most likely was named for the thorny nettle plants encountered there.

== See also ==
- List of rivers of Ohio
