= Netta (disambiguation) =

Netta is a genus of diving ducks.

Netta may also refer to:

- Netta Barzilai, known mononymously as Netta, an Israeli singer
- Netta (name)
- Netta (river) in north-east Poland
- Netta (village), near Augustów in north-east Poland
- Netta, an introductory form of netball

== See also ==
- Neta (disambiguation)
- Natta (disambiguation)
- Nesta (disambiguation)
- Netra (disambiguation)
- Nette (disambiguation)
- Netto (disambiguation)
- Nitta (disambiguation)
