= Netti =

Netti may refer to

- The Nettipakarana, a Buddhist scripture
- Aeschynomene aspera, a species of flowering plant in the family Fabaceae
- Netti (name)

== See also ==
- Neti (disambiguation)
- Netta (disambiguation)
- Netto (disambiguation)
- Nettie (disambiguation)
- Netty (disambiguation)
- Nitti (disambiguation)
- Notti (disambiguation)
