= Neto Carletto =

Brazilian politician (born 1996)

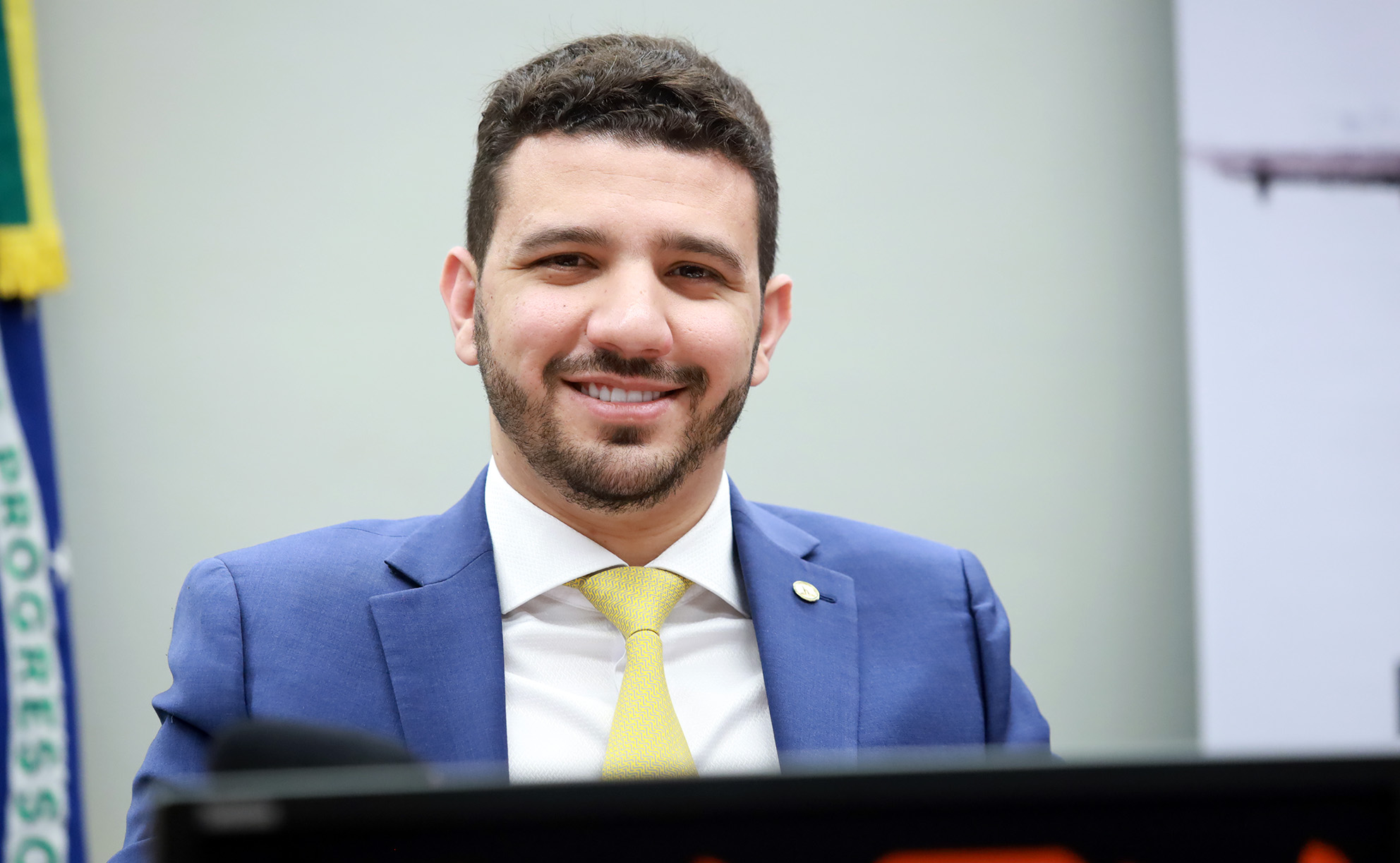
- Carletto in 2023

Member of the Chamber of Deputies
- Incumbent
- Assumed office 1 February 2023
- Constituency: Bahia

Personal details
- Born: Orlando Sulz de Almeida Neto; 28 May 1996 (age 30) Itamaraju, Bahia, Brazil
- Party: Avante (since 2025)
- Other political affiliations: PP (2015–2025)
- Relatives: Ronaldo Carletto (uncle)

Orlando Sulz de Almeida Neto (born 28 May 1996), better known as Neto Carletto, is a Brazilian politician serving as a member of the Chamber of Deputies since 2023. He is the nephew of Ronaldo Carletto.
