= Nettie =

Nettie may refer to:

== Literature ==
- The Nettie Palmer Prize for Non-fiction, an Australian literary award offered for a published work of non-fiction and a component of the annual Victorian Premier's Literary Award

== Medicine ==
- Nettie pot, also neti pot, a device used for nasal irrigation

== Music ==
- "Nettie", a song by Type O Negative's on the album Life Is Killing Me
- "Nettie Moore", a song on the album Modern Times (Bob Dylan album)

== People ==
- Nettie (name)

== Places ==
- Nettie, West Virginia, an unincorporated community in Nicholas County, West Virginia, in the United States
- Lake Nettie National Wildlife Refuge in North Dakota in the United States

== Ships ==
- USS Nettie (SP-1436), a United States Navy patrol boat in commission from 1917 to 1918

== See also ==
- Neti (disambiguation)
- Netti (disambiguation)
- Netty (disambiguation)
