= Netti Shanker Yadav =

Indian politician

M Shankar Yadav GHMC Corporator
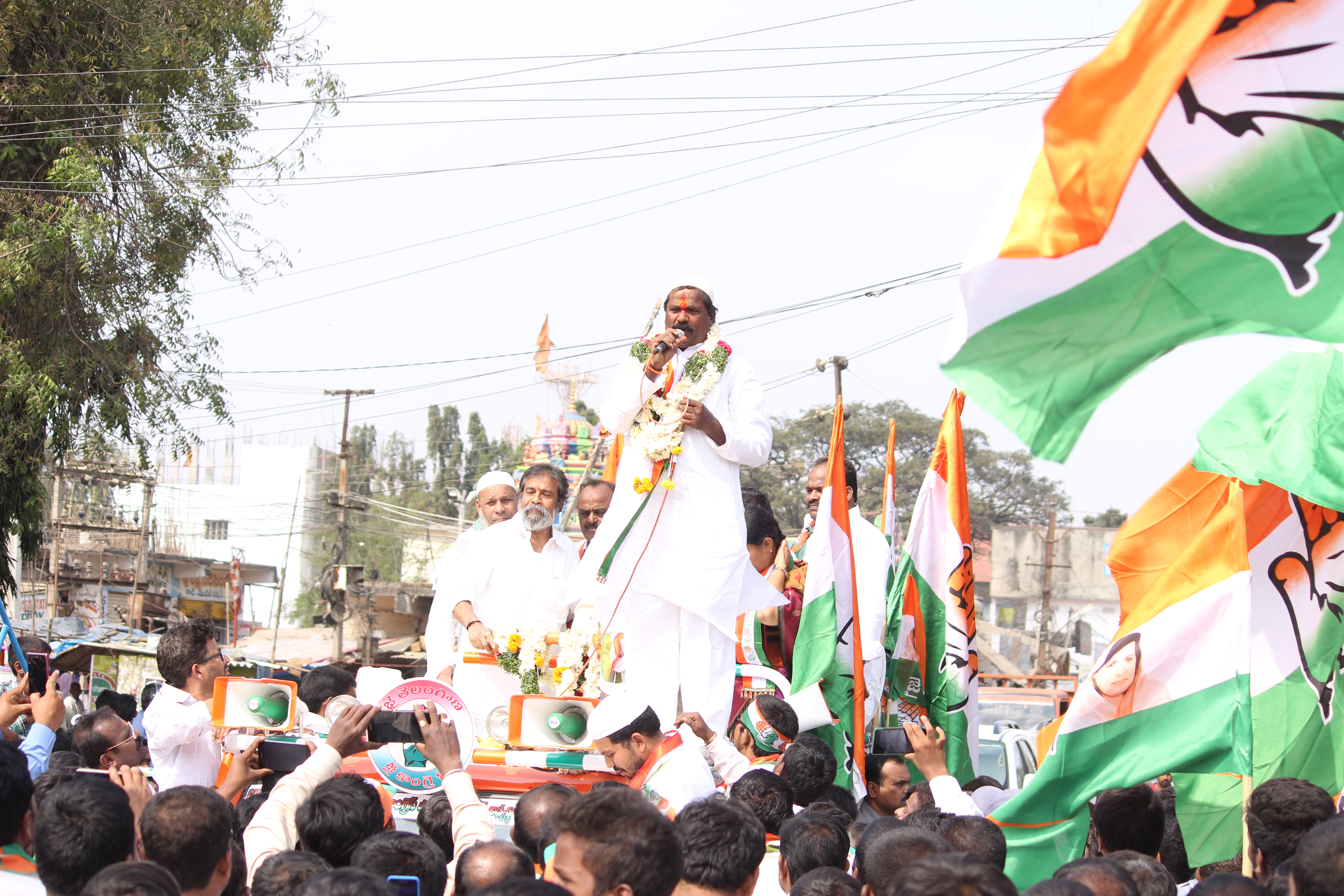

Patancheru Corporator, GHMC Hyderabad
- Incumbent
- Assumed office 5 February 2016
- Preceded by: M Sapana Dev

Block Congress President Indian National Congress
- Incumbent
- Assumed office 25 September 2014

Personal details
- Born: 14 April 1962 (age 64) Patancheru, Medak district (present-day Sangareddy district, Telangana, India)
- Party: Indian National Congress
- Parent(s): Somaiah; Laxmamma

Mettu Shanker Yadav (born 12 June 1962) is an Indian politician. He is a member of the Indian National Congress. He is the Block Congress Committee President Of Patancheru and Patancheru GHMC Corporator. He Won as Patancheru GHMC Corporator with 1400 Majority Against TRS Party Candidate.

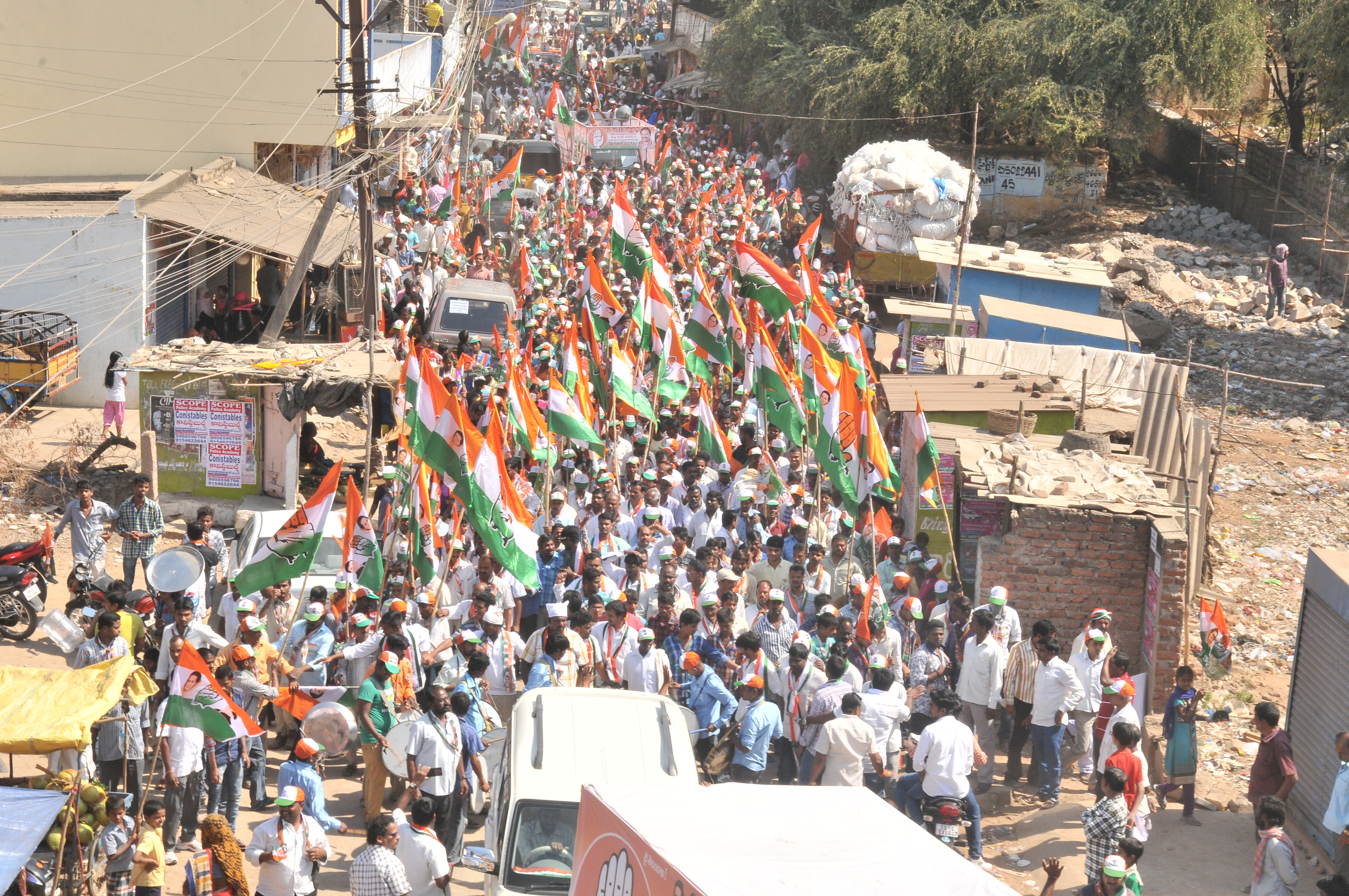
Huge Rally Before Elections

== Early life ==
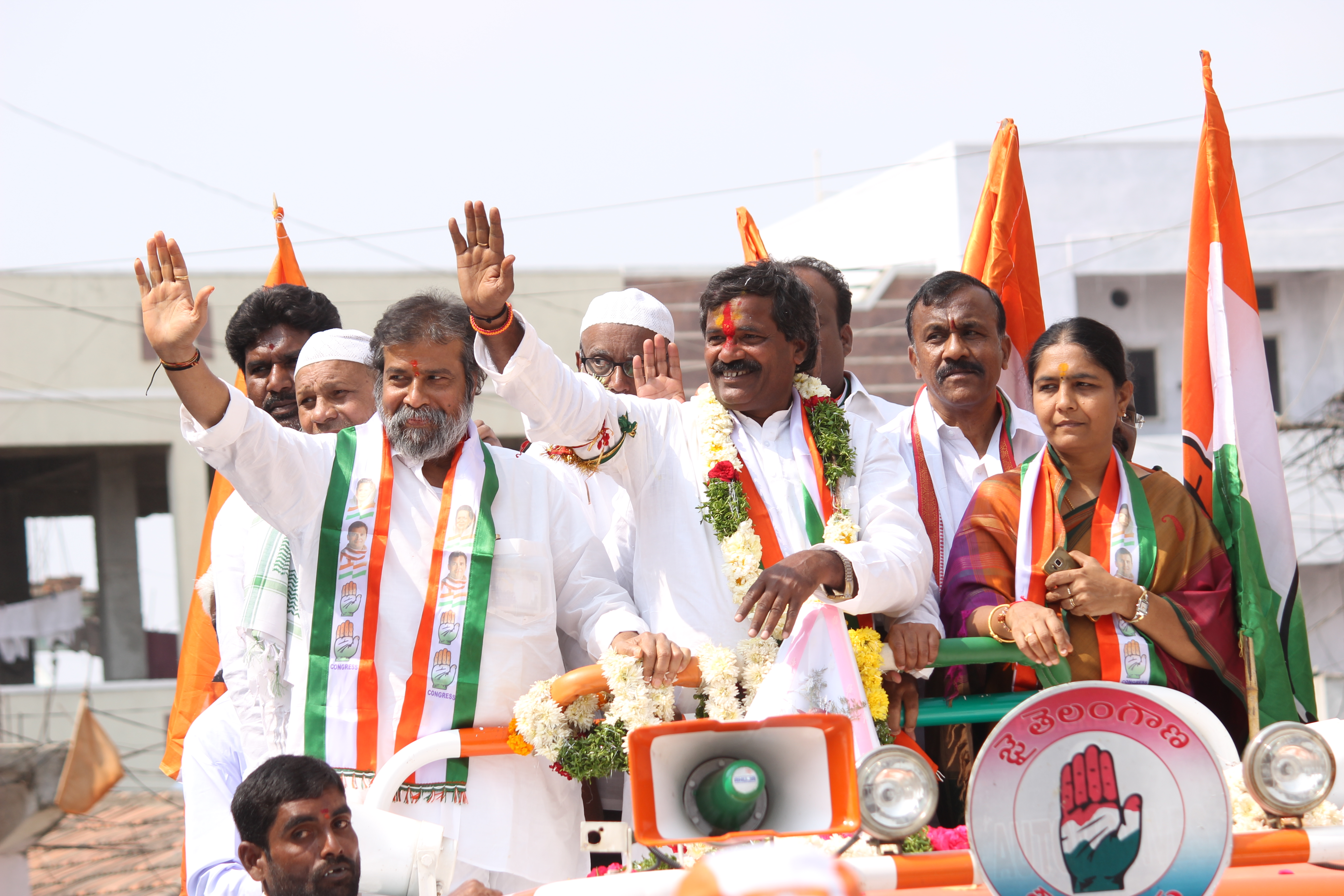
ksy

Shankar Yadav was born in Patancheru, Medak District to Somayya and Laxmamma. His (poor) family was in a Backward Caste. He is third of six children, with two brothers and three sisters. His Father died when he was 6. He studied 10th standard in a ZPHS High School in Patancheru. He attended I.T.I in Mallepally in Hyderabad. He then graduated in Turner.

He participated in social and cultural activities in the locality and looked after welfare of local people even in childhood itself. He established a vyamashala (gym) at Patancheru and encouraged youth. He conducted and participated in sports and games.

== Personal life ==
Yadav married Padma and they have a son and daughter. He serve as Block Congress Committee President and corporator Patanchru 113 division (GHMC).

== Career ==
At age 19 he participated in canvassing for Janta Party during 1980 Parliament Elections Against Congress Party.

During 1983 actively participated in Assembly Elections in Canvassing BJP from Sangareddy Constituency.

During 1986 he ran for Mandal Praja Parishad (MPP) elections for Patancheru Mandal from BJP Party. He lost with few votes.

During 1988 Gram Panchayat Elections he won Ward Number and became Upa-Sarpanch.

In 1995 he was elected as a Sarpanch of Patancheru Town and served until 2001. He supported minority communities and helped them secure jobs. As a Sarpanch of Patancheru played a vital role in Patancheru town Development. During the tenure underground drainages were laid and constructed, before there were no drains but after taking charge of town totally constructed drainages in all the colonies, CC Roads constructed with the help of MP funds from Medak MP Baga Reddy, BT Roads were also constructed in town with the Gram Panchayat Funds, formation of Roads & metal Roads in Patancheru. Established Pipe lines and Supplied free manjeera water to all the colonies in Patancheru. Lighting of street light in all the colonies. Daily morning visited colonies to look after cleanliness of Environment.

Again in 2001 contested for Sarpanch elections, but with a few votes lost in that election.

In 2009 Patancheru Emerged under the Hyderabad Municipal Corporation, and contested in Corporation Elections from Congress Party but lost with a few rebel votes(approx 500 votes). Won As Patancheru Corporator in 2016 from Congress Party.

== Political Statistics ==
| S.No | Year | Assembly Constituency | Opponent | Votes | Majority | Result |
|---|---|---|---|---|---|---|
| 1 | 1995 | Patancheru | Unknown (TDP) | 7000 | 2400 | Won |
| 2 | 2003 | Patancheru | Devendar Raju (INC) | 6700 | 2000 | Lost |
| 3 | 2009 | Patancheru | M Sapana Dev (TDP) | 8000 | 500 | Lost |
| 4 | 2016 | Patancheru | Rajaboina Kumar Yadav (TRS) | 9316 | 1388 | Won |

== Service for BJP Party ==
Patancheru Mandal BJP President for 3 yrs. Served for BJP Party Medak district as BJP Party Vice-President and also Medak District BJP General Secretary. During the tenure visited almost all the villages of the District for the development of Party activities, and also took BJP Welfare measures to the people and also served as BJP convenor for Medak District.

== Service for Congress Party ==
Joined Congress Party in 2009 with Y. S. Rajasekhara Reddy (Late Chief Minister of Andhra Pradesh). In the same Year got Corporator Ticket from Congress Party. But lost elections with margin of 500 votes. In 2010 Served for Medak District as Congress FAC Member(Food Advisory Committee). In 2013 serving as Congress Constituency In charge for Patancheru (Block Congress Committee President).

== Trade union activities ==
In Patancheru established Worker's Unions in many Major, Minor & Small Scale Industries and served workmen and made Wage settlements disputes under the banner of Bharateeya Mazdoor Sangh.

== Un-organised labour unions ==
President of Auto Rickshaw Drivers union of Patancheru, Isnapur, Lingampally. Looked after the welfare of Auto Rickshaw Drivers. Fought against hike of petrol rates. President of Wall Painting Workers at Patancheru (about 400 workmen). President of tapi Mestries (Masons)and daily casual labourers at Patancheru.

| image =

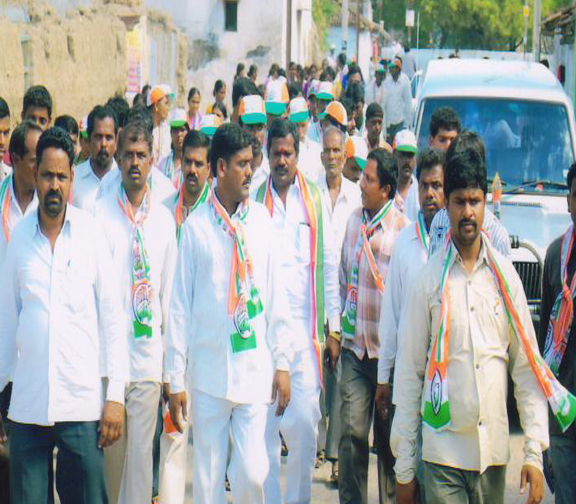
ksy 23

== Agitations for the public causes ==
Fought against Industrial Pollution in Patancheru, Bollaram. Filed a petition against Industrial pollution Supreme Court & Supreme Court has given the order to free supply of Manjeera Water. Fought against AL-Kabeer Slaughter House Factory situated in Rudraram. Done Padayatra from Patancheru to Singuru Dam for supply of water to farmers & also done padayatra from Lingampally to the Sangareddy for laying NH-9 High Way Road.

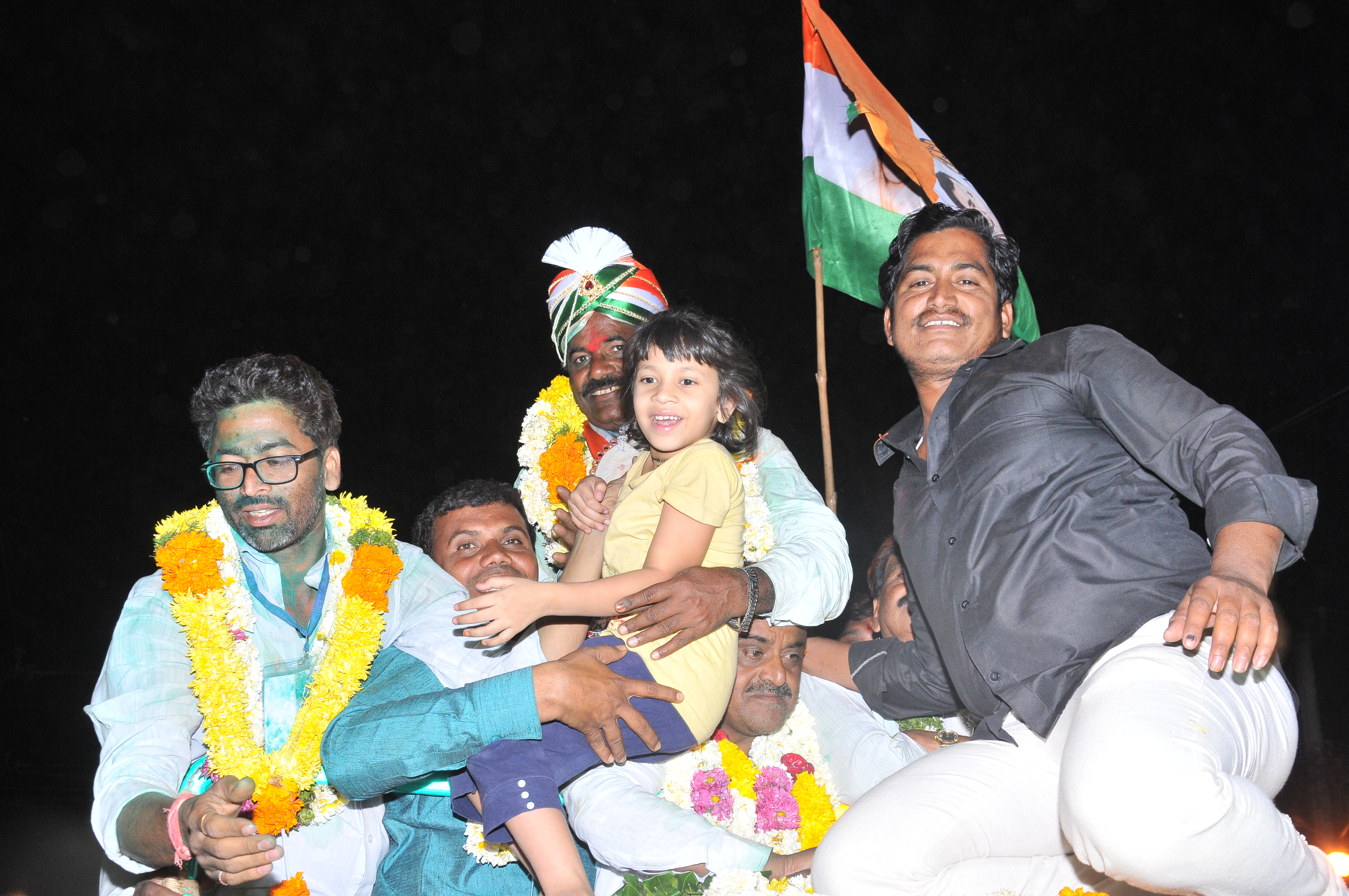
Winning Rally

== Service to the State ==
Served as Secretary for the AP State Forum Sarpanches. Visited Shri Puttparthi Sai Baba along with APState Sarpanches forum and submitted Memorandum for the supply of water to Medak District and achieved. Visited Delhi and submitted memorandum to the Prime Minister of India Sri Atal Bihari Vajpayee, all Union Ministers and also to the LOk Sabha opposition leader Smt. Sonia Gandhi(UPA Chair-Person) and Submitted Memorandum for the Rights of Village Sarpanches of Andhra Pradesh State.

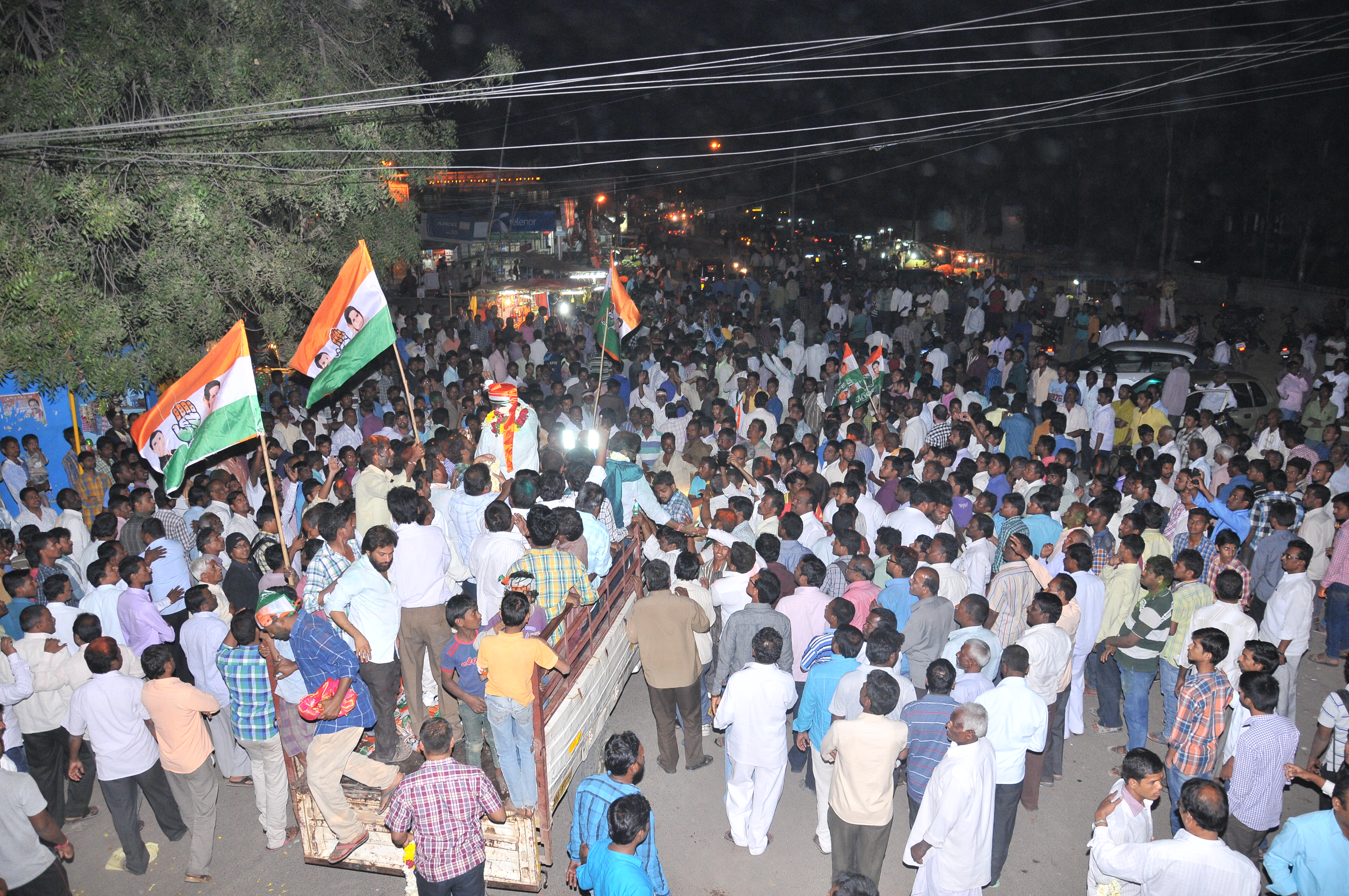
Winning Rally

== Spiritual activities ==
Encouraged and helped momentarily for construction of temples in the vicinity. During the tenure of Sarpanch of Patancheru Town, land provided and got constructed Sai Baba Temple. Encouraged and helped in the procurement of land for Brahma Kumaris Eshwariya Viswa Vidyala. Visited Mount Abu several times and participated in Raja Yoga.

== Achievements ==
- Fought for manjeera water in supreme court.
- Played an important role in bringing industries to Patancheru town.
- Transformed Patancheru village to city with development.

== Service to the people ==
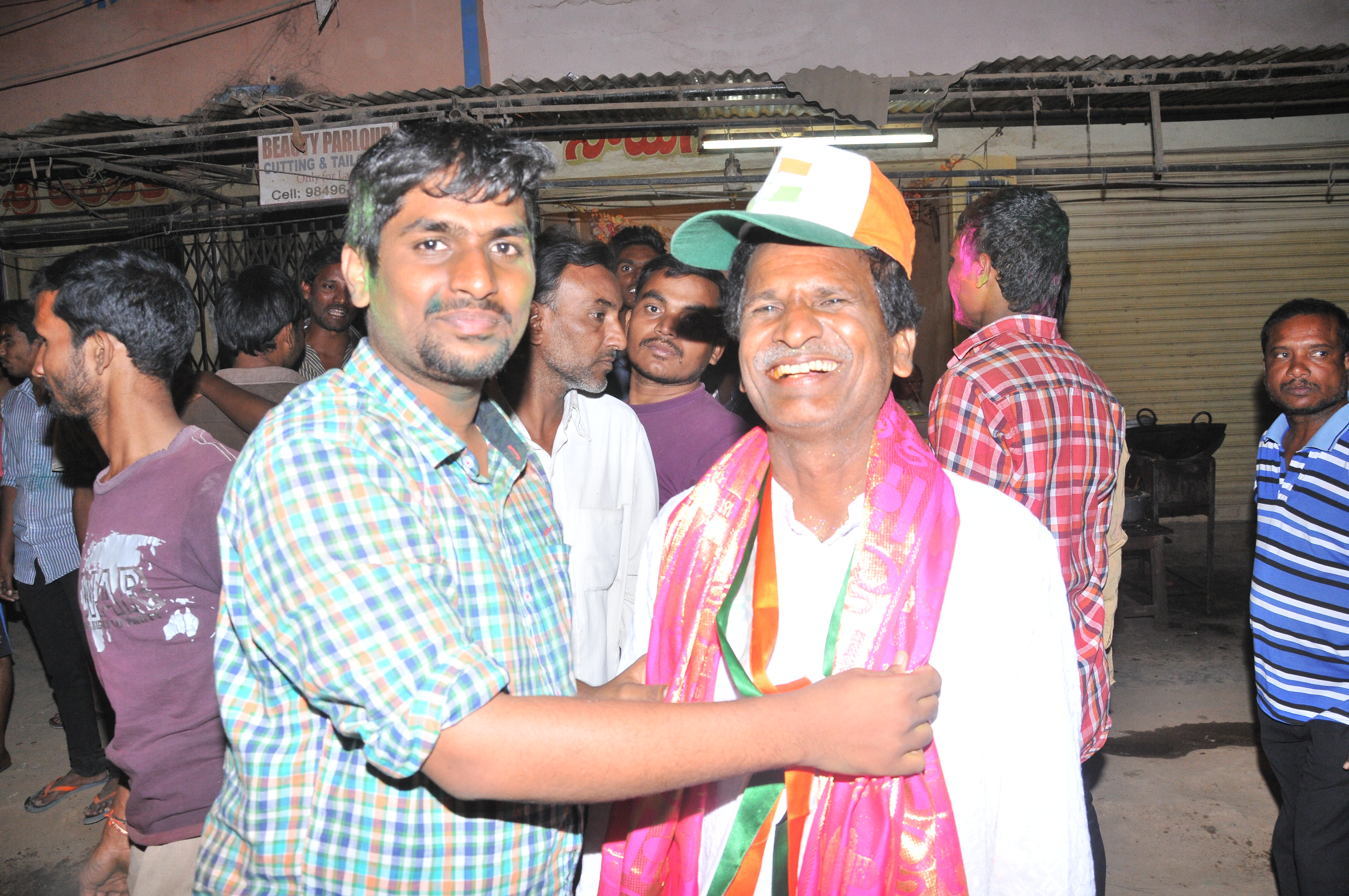
Shankar Yadav Brother Son Vinod Yadav Felicitating Person Who Is The Die Hard Fan Of M Shankar Yadav.

when he became Sarpanch he cleared Slums from the Patancheru town, which served almost satisfaction of villagers till 2001. Supported all the minority communities . Visited colonies and took note of the problems of village and one by one he solved all problems of the Patancheru town.He helped all the Govt Department officers in all aspects. As a Sarpanch of Patancherupalyed he played vital role in Patancheru Town development. During his tenure Under Ground Drainage were laid and constructed, before there was no drains but during his tenure he constructed drainage in all the colonies, CC Roads constructed with help of MP Funds from Medak MP Baga Reddy. BT Roads was also constructed in town with Gram Panchayat Funds. Formation of Roads and metal Roads in Patancheru, established Pipe lines and Supplied free manjeera water to all the colonies in Patancheru. Lighting of Street Lights in all the colonies. Daily morning he visited colonies to look after Environment and cleanliness.
