= Neto (footballer, born 1952) =

Brazilian footballer

Personal information
- Full name: Luís Antônio Neto
- Date of birth: 3 November 1952 (age 73)
- Place of birth: Guaxupé, Brazil
- Height: 1.80 m (5 ft 11 in)
- Position: Centre-back

Youth career
- Muzambinho

Senior career*
Years	Team	Apps	(Gls)
1971–1973	Caldense		
1973–1974	Atlético Paranaense		
1974–1977	Caldense		
1976	→ Santos (loan)		
1977–1982	Santos		
1983	Figueirense		
1983–1985	Santo André		
1985	→ Bahia (loan)		
1986–1987	Comercial-MS		
1987	Portuguesa Santista		
- * Club domestic league appearances and goals as of 28 November 2023

Luís Antônio Neto (born 3 November 1952), simply known as Neto, is a Brazilian former professional footballer who played as a centre-back.

== Career ==
Neto began his career as a professional at Caldense, where he stood out in the early 70s. He was loaned to Atlético-PR and later to Santos, where in 1978 he became state champion. He also worked for Comercial-MS, Santo André, Bahia and Portuguesa Santista. He currently resides in the city of Cubatão.

== Internacional career ==
Neto was part of the Brazil national team squad that competed in the 1975 Copa América, when players from Minas Gerais mostly formed the team.

== Honours ==
Santos

- Campeonato Paulista: 1978

Comercial

- Campeonato Sul-Mato-Grossense: 1987
