= Neto Pereira =

Brazilian footballer

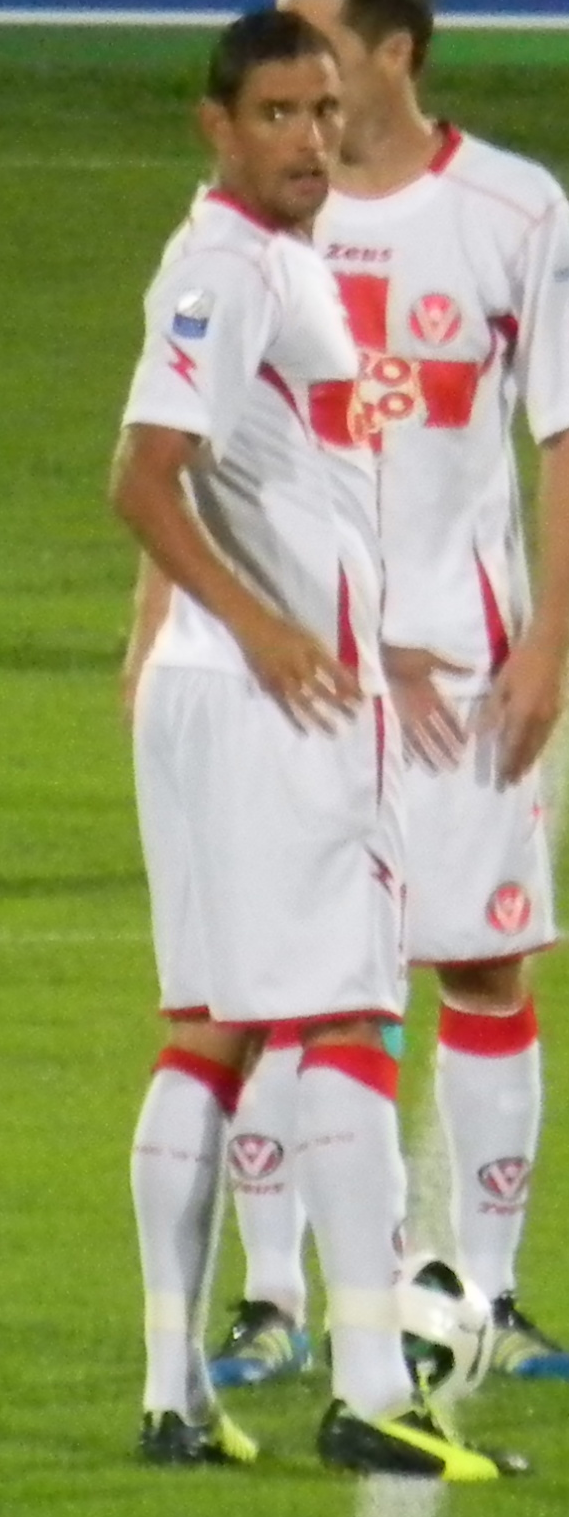

Personal information
- Full name: Leonidas Pereira Neto de Sousa
- Date of birth: 4 January 1979 (age 47)
- Place of birth: General Carneiro, Brazil
- Height: 1.87 m (6 ft 2 in)
- Position: Forward

Senior career*
Years	Team	Apps	(Gls)
2000	Matsubara	15	(11)
2001–2010	Itala San Marco	258	(114)
2010–2015	Varese	154	(31)
2015–2017	Padova	53	(15)
2017–2018	Mestre	28	(5)
2018–2019	Milano City	27	(4)
2019	Luparense	0	(0)
2019–2020	Este	18	(3)
2020	Olimpia Ponte Tresa		

Managerial career
- 2020–2023: Città di Varese (assistant)
- * Club domestic league appearances and goals

Leonidas Pereira Neto de Sousa (born 4 January 1979), known as Neto Pereira, is a Brazilian football coach and a former player.

== Biography ==
Neto (means grandson), son of Mr. Pereira and Ms. (née) Sousa, started his career at Matsubara and played at 2000 Torneo di Viareggio where he was scouted.

=== Itala San Marco ===
Neto Neto Pereira joined Italian Serie D side Itala San Marco in January 2001. Neto Neto Pereira played for the club for 9 years and won the Serie D group stage champion in 2008. In 2004, he was trailed at Triestina but the transfer was failed due to work permit issue (Serie B clubs cannot sign non-EU players abroad nor from Serie D). He was allowed to remain at the promoted side for Lega Pro Seconda Divisione 2008–09 season and played as captain.

=== Varese ===
On 31 January 2010, he was loaned to Lega Pro Prima Divisione side Varese as the club did not have a true regular goalscorer except Osariemen Ebagua. Neto Neto Pereira scored an equalizer goal in his debut against Benevento. The match ended in 1–1 draw. The club won promotion to Serie B at the end of season and signed him to a permanent deal.

In his debut in the Italian second division, he scored a goal against Torino, while Varese won 2–1 at the Stadio Olimpico di Torino.

=== Padova ===
On 17 July 2015, after remaining free agent, signing for Padova in Lega Pro.
