= Netto (surname) =

The surname Netto may refer to:

- Adevaldo Virgílio Netto (born 1943), Brazilian footballer
- Adolpho Araújo Netto (born 1984), Brazilian footballer
- Andrei Netto (born 1977), Brazilian journalist and writer
- Antônio Carbonari Netto, Brazilian educator, mathematician, and businessman
- Antônio Delfim Netto (1928–2024), Brazilian economist and politician
- Antonio Ferreira Batalha Silva-Netto (1876–1962), Hong Kong Macanese businessman
- Antônio Gonzaga Netto, Brazilian footballer and manager
- Benjamin Silva-Netto (born 1939), Filipino long-distance runner
- Carlos Javier Netto (born 1970), Argentine footballer
- Chico Netto (Francisco Bueno Netto, 1894–1959), Brazilian footballer
- Clairton Netto (born 1998), Brazilian footballer
- Curt Netto (1847–1909), German metallurgist and educator
- Daniel Kozelinski Netto (born 1952), Brazilian theologian
- Eugen Netto (1848–1919), German mathematician
- Fábio Roberto Gomes Netto (born 1997), Brazilian footballer
- Francisco Correa Netto (born 17th century), Portuguese sexton
- Hadrian Maria Netto (1885–1947), German stage and film actor
- Hermógenes Netto (1913–1989), Brazilian cyclist
- Igor Netto (1930–1999), Soviet footballer
- Irena Netto (1899–1992), Polish actress
- José Luiz Olaio Netto, Brazilian basketball player
- Ladislau de Souza Mello Netto (1838–1894), Brazilian botanist
- Leandro Netto de Macedo (born 1979), Brazilian footballer
- Leonardo Gonçalves Martins Netto (born 1989), Brazilian footballer
- Loz Netto, member of British rock band Sniff 'n' the Tears
- Luisinho Netto (born 1974), Brazilian footballer
- Nalini Netto (born 1957), Indian officer
- Rodrigo Netto (1977–2006), Brazilian musician
- Ruan Tressoldi Netto (born 1999), Brazilian footballer
- Ruy Netto (born 1980), Brazilian footballer
- Sebastião do Rego Barros Netto (1940–2015), Brazilian lawyer and diplomat
- Uwe Siemon-Netto, (1936–2025), German theologian and journalist
- Walter Souza Braga Netto (born 1957), Brazilian army general and Minister of Defence

== See also ==
- Neto (suffix)
