= Chainsaw Man (TV series) =

Japanese anime television series

- チェンソーマン; Chensō Man
- Genre: Action; Comedy horror; Dark fantasy
- Based on: Chainsaw Man by Tatsuki Fujimoto
- Screenplay by: Hiroshi Seko
- Directed by: Ryū Nakayama; Makoto Nakazono (Note: Chief director / chief episode director (チーフ演出))
- Voices of: Kikunosuke Toya; Fairouz Ai; Shogo Sakata; Tomori Kusunoki; Shiori Izawa; Karin Takahashi
- Music by: Kensuke Ushio
- Opening theme: "Kick Back" by Kenshi Yonezu
- Ending theme: See note (Note: All twelve ending theme songs, listed in alphabetical order: "Chainsaw Blood" by Vaundy; "Chu, Tayōsei" (ちゅ、多様性。) by Ano; "Dainōteki na Rendezvous" (大脳的なランデブー) by Kanaria; "Deep Down" by Aimer; "Dogland" by People 1; "Fight Song" (ファイトソング) by Eve; "First Death" by TK from Ling Tosite Sigure; "Hawatari Ni-Oku Centi" (刃渡り2億センチ) by Maximum the Hormone (also used as an insert song); "In the Back Room" (インザバックルーム) by Syudou; "Jōzai" (錠剤) by Tooboe; "Violence" (バイオレンス) by Queen Bee; "Zanki" (残機) by Zutomayo)
- Country of origin: Japan
- Original language: Japanese
- No. of seasons: 1
- No. of episodes: 12 (list of episodes)

Production
- Producers: Makoto Kimura (Note: Production producer); Keisuke Seshimo (Note: Creative / animation producer)
- Cinematography: Teppei Itō
- Animator: MAPPA
- Editor: Masato Yoshitake
- Running time: 23 minutes; 25 minutes (#1, 10)
- Production company: MAPPA

Original release
- Network: TV Tokyo
- Release: October 12 – December 28, 2022

Related
- Chainsaw Man – The Movie: Reze Arc

Chainsaw Man (チェンソーマン, Chensō Man) is a Japanese anime television series produced by MAPPA, based on the manga series Chainsaw Man by Tatsuki Fujimoto. The series was directed by Ryū Nakayama, with series composition and scripts by Hiroshi Seko. Makoto Nakazono and Tatsuya Yoshihara respectively served as chief episode director and action director, with character designs by Kazutaka Sugiyama and demon designs by Kiyotaka Oshiyama. The series' music was composed by Kensuke Ushio. Unlike typical anime in which a production committee consisting of multiple companies is formed to regulate production, the series was solely produced by its animation studio, MAPPA.

The series aired on TV Tokyo and its TXN affiliates from October 12 to December 28, 2022. (Note: TV Tokyo listed the series as airing every Tuesday at 24:00, which is effectively Wednesday at midnight JST.) Crunchyroll licensed the series for worldwide streaming outside of East Asia. Medialink obtained the licensing for Southeast Asia. A sequel film, titled Chainsaw Man – The Movie: Reze Arc, was released by Toho in Japan on September 19, 2025. An anime adaptation of the manga's "Assassins" arc has been announced.

== Synopsis ==
Denji, a young man who shares his life with Pochita, a chainsaw devil, is forced to survive by killing devils and selling their parts to pay off the debt he inherited after his father's death. His existence has been a succession of hardships until a fatal betrayal leads to his death. In an unexpected turn, Pochita makes a pact with him, allowing him to be resurrected as "Chainsaw Man", a hybrid entity with the heart of a demon.

== Voice cast ==
Character	Japanese	English
Denji (デンジ)	Kikunosuke Toya	Ryan Colt Levy
Power (パワー, Pawā)	Fairouz Ai	Sarah Wiedenheft
Aki Hayakawa (早川アキ, Hayakawa Aki)	Shogo Sakata	Reagan Murdock; Bryson Baugus (young)
Makima (マキマ)	Tomori Kusunoki	Suzie Yeung
Pochita (ポチタ)	Shiori Izawa	Lindsay Seidel
Reze (レゼ)	Reina Ueda	Alexis Tipton
Kobeni Higashiyama (東山 コベニ, Higashiyama Kobeni)	Karin Takahashi	Bryn Apprill

== Production and release ==
In December 2020, it was announced that the manga would be adapted into an anime by the studio MAPPA. The theatrical presentation at Jump Festa '21, as part of the online theatrical presentations of Jump Studio, took place from December 19–20, 2020.

The first trailer for the anime was presented during the "MAPPA Stage 2021" – 10th Anniversary event, held on June 27, 2021. The series was broadcast on TV Tokyo and its TXN affiliates from October 12 to December 28, 2022, with several non-affiliate networks following weeks later.

Regarding the adaptation of the series, Fujimoto stated that he talked to the people handling it and was comfortable leaving things to them. When the anime adaptation was officially announced, Fujimoto commented, "Chainsaw Man is like a copycat of Dorohedoro and Jujutsu Kaisen, and the studio of Dorohedoro and Jujutsu Kaisen will produce its anime!? I have nothing to say! Please do it!" According to the manga's editor, Shihei Lin, Fujimoto is heavily involved in the production of the anime series, stating, "Fujimoto-san has seen all the Chainsaw Man's pitch documents, story structure, scripts, and even the storyboards. He has continued to be in close contact with MAPPA's anime team." MAPPA producer, Makoto Kimura, also commented that Fujimoto involvement extended to the casting, planning, and music, because the staff wanted the anime to capture as much of the manga's original vision as possible, including the violence and gore. MAPPA approached Shueisha with the pitch to adapt the manga into an anime.

=== Film ===
At the Jump Festa '24 event in December 2023, an anime film entitled Chainsaw Man – The Movie: Reze Arc (劇場版 チェンソーマン レゼ篇, Gekijō-ban Chensō Man: Reze-hen), was announced. Most staff and cast reprised their roles, while Tatsuya Yoshihara replaced Ryū Nakayama as director on the film. The film is a direct sequel to the television series, and covers the events of the "Reze" arc from the manga. It was distributed by Toho and premiered in Japan on September 19, 2025.

=== Sequel ===
At the Jump Festa '26 event in December 2025, an anime sequel, Chainsaw Man – Assassins Arc (チェンソーマン 刺客篇, Chensō Man: Shikaku-hen), was announced. Its release format was not revealed. On June 19, 2026, It was revealed that the series staff and Tatsuya Yoshihara, the film's director, will return to reprise their roles in the anime.

== Music ==
The music of the series was composed by Kensuke Ushio. The first soundtrack EP (for episodes 1–3), was released on October 26, 2022; the second EP (for episodes 4–7) was released on November 23; and the third EP (for episodes 8–12) was released on December 28. The original soundtrack album, Chainsaw Man Original Soundtrack Complete Edition: Chainsaw Edge Fragments, was released on January 23, 2023. The opening theme song is "Kick Back", performed by Kenshi Yonezu, while each episode features a different ending theme song.

== Video game ==
A smartphone game was announced at the "MAPPA 15th Anniversary Lineup Reveal" livestream event on June 19, 2026. The game will feature an opening animated sequence by MAPPA with a song by Maximum the Hormone titled "All the Mince!!! All the Mince!!".

== Reception ==
=== Critical response ===
On review aggregator website Rotten Tomatoes, the series holds an approval rating of 97% based on 89 reviews, with an average rating of 8/10. The site's critics consensus reads, "Distinguished by its rip-roaring animation and serrated sense of humor, Chainsaw Man is an action anime with teeth." Mónica Marie Zorrilla of Inverse described Chainsaw Man as the standout of "demon-fighting anime" in 2022. She also praised Denji's contrast to other Shōnen protagonists in his simpler motivations for "girls and food". Rafael Motamayor of IGN praised Chainsaw Man's cinematography, character dynamics and approach to its emotional moments. He also described it as a successful mix of "workplace comedy, horror, and action series", in contrast to most shōnen. IGN and Polygon praised the action scenes and its sudden tonal shifts from emotional scenes to "juvenile, 2000s sex comedy humor", while Polygon also praised its twelve different ending scenes.

The Encyclopedia of Science Fiction described Chainsaw Man as an enjoyable anime adaptation that combines extensive gore and impressively animated action with crude humor and substantial character development, particularly for Denji, Aki and Himeno. It considered Denji's fixation on sex somewhat irritating, but contextualized his behavior through his age, impoverished upbringing, lack of adult supervision and limited social relationships. The encyclopedia particularly praised the way the series balances its more thoughtful and emotionally affecting moments with its violent action and comedy.

=== Accolades ===
Year	Award	Category	Recipient	Result	Ref.
2022	Billboard Japan Music Awards	Hot Animation	"Kick Back" by Kenshi Yonezu	9th place	
2022	Reiwa Anisong Awards	Best Work Award	"Kick Back" by Kenshi Yonezu	Nominated	
2022	Reiwa Anisong Awards	Best Anime Song Award	"Kick Back" by Kenshi Yonezu	Won	
2022	Reiwa Anisong Awards	Lyrics Award	"Chu, Tayōsei" by Ano (Note: Both Ano and Shuichi Mabe are credited as the nominees.)	Nominated	
2022	Reiwa Anisong Awards	Composition Award	"Kick Back" by Kenshi Yonezu (Note: Kenshi Yonezu is credited as the nominee.)	Nominated	
2022	Reiwa Anisong Awards	Arrangement Award	"Kick Back" by Kenshi Yonezu (Note: Both Kenshi Yonezu and Daiki Tsuneta are credited as the nominees.)	Nominated	
2023	Annecy International Animation Film Festival	Best TV Films Production	Chainsaw Man – Episode 1: "Dog & Chainsaw"	Nominated	
2023	Japan Expo Awards	Daruma for Best Anime	Chainsaw Man	Nominated	
2023	Japan Expo Awards	Daruma for Best Director	Chainsaw Man	Nominated	
2023	Japan Expo Awards	Daruma for Best Action Anime	Chainsaw Man	Nominated	
2023	Japan Expo Awards	Daruma for Best Original Soundtrack	Chainsaw Man	Nominated	
2023	Japan Expo Awards	Daruma for Best Opening	"Kick Back" by Kenshi Yonezu	Won	
2023	Japan Expo Awards	Daruma for Best Ending	"Hawatari Ni-Oku Centi" by Maximum the Hormone	Nominated	
2023	45th Anime Grand Prix	Best Theme Song	"Kick Back" by Kenshi Yonezu	5th place	
2023	13th Newtype Anime Awards	Best Character (Male)	Aki Hayakawa	6th place	
2023	13th Newtype Anime Awards	Best Mascot Character	Pochita	5th place	
2023	29th Manga Barcelona Awards	Best Anime Series Premiere	Chainsaw Man	Nominated	
2023	Billboard Japan Music Awards	Hot 100	"Kick Back" by Kenshi Yonezu	4th place	
2023	Billboard Japan Music Awards	Most Streaming Songs	"Kick Back" by Kenshi Yonezu	4th place	
2023	Billboard Japan Music Awards	Most Downloaded Songs	"Kick Back" by Kenshi Yonezu	8th place	
2023	Billboard Japan Music Awards	Hot Animation	"Kick Back" by Kenshi Yonezu	2nd place	
2023	Billboard Japan Music Awards	Top User Generated Songs	"Kick Back" by Kenshi Yonezu	12th place	
2024	51st Saturn Awards	Best Animated Television Series or Special	Chainsaw Man	Nominated	
2024	8th Crunchyroll Anime Awards	Anime of the Year	Chainsaw Man	Nominated	
2024	8th Crunchyroll Anime Awards	Best Main Character	Denji	Nominated	
2024	8th Crunchyroll Anime Awards	Best Supporting Character	Power	Nominated	
2024	8th Crunchyroll Anime Awards	"Must Protect at All Costs" Character	Pochita	Nominated	
2024	8th Crunchyroll Anime Awards	Best Animation	Chainsaw Man	Nominated	
2024	8th Crunchyroll Anime Awards	Best Director	Ryū Nakayama	Nominated	
2024	8th Crunchyroll Anime Awards	Best Action	Chainsaw Man	Nominated	
2024	8th Crunchyroll Anime Awards	Best New Series	Chainsaw Man	Won	
2024	8th Crunchyroll Anime Awards	Best Character Design	Kazutaka Sugiyama	Nominated	
2024	8th Crunchyroll Anime Awards	Best Cinematography	Teppei Itō	Nominated	
2024	8th Crunchyroll Anime Awards	Best Art Direction	Yusuke Takeda	Nominated	
2024	8th Crunchyroll Anime Awards	Best Score	Kensuke Ushio	Nominated	
2024	8th Crunchyroll Anime Awards	Best Anime Song	"Kick Back" by Kenshi Yonezu	Nominated	
2024	8th Crunchyroll Anime Awards	Best Opening Sequence	"Kick Back" by Kenshi Yonezu	Nominated	
2024	8th Crunchyroll Anime Awards	Best Ending Sequence	"Hawatari Ni-Oku Centi" by Maximum the Hormone	Nominated	
2024	8th Crunchyroll Anime Awards	Best VA Performance (Japanese)	Kikunosuke Toya as Denji	Nominated	
2024	8th Crunchyroll Anime Awards	Best VA Performance (English)	Ryan Colt Levy as Denji	Won	
2024	8th Crunchyroll Anime Awards	Best VA Performance (Spanish)	Emilio Trevino as Denji	Won	
2024	8th Crunchyroll Anime Awards	Best VA Performance (French)	Zina Khakhoulia as Power	Nominated	
2024	8th Crunchyroll Anime Awards	Best VA Performance (German)	Franziska Trunte as Power	Won	
2024	8th Crunchyroll Anime Awards	Best VA Performance (Portuguese)	Luisa Viotti as Makima	Nominated	
2024	8th Crunchyroll Anime Awards	Best VA Performance (Castilian)	Joel Gomez Jimenez as Denji	Won	
2024	8th Crunchyroll Anime Awards	Best VA Performance (Castilian)	Maria Luisa Marciel as Power	Nominated	
2024	8th Crunchyroll Anime Awards	Best VA Performance (Italian)	Benedetta Ponticelli as Makima	Nominated	
2024	8th Crunchyroll Anime Awards	Best VA Performance (Italian)	Mosè Singh as Denji	Won	
2025	Music Awards Japan	Top Japanese Song in Europe	"Kick Back" by Kenshi Yonezu	Nominated	
2025	Music Awards Japan	Top Japanese Song in North America	"Kick Back" by Kenshi Yonezu	Nominated	
2025	20th AnimaniA Awards	Best TV Series: Disc	Chainsaw Man	Nominated	
