= MTV Video Music Award Japan for Best New Artist =

Annual Japanese music award

MTV Video Music Award Japan for Best New Artist Video
- Country: Japan
- Presented by: MTV Japan
- First award: 2002

The MTV Video Music Award Japan for Best New Artist Video (最優秀新人アーティストビデオ賞) is an annual award given by MTV Japan as part of the MTV Video Music Awards Japan since 2002.

== Results ==
The following table displays the nominees and the winners in bold print with a yellow background.

=== 2000s ===
Year	Artist	Video
**2002** (1st)	**Rip Slyme**	
**2002** (1st)	BoA	
**2002** (1st)	Chemistry	
**2002** (1st)	Alicia Keys	
**2002** (1st)	Linkin Park	
**2003** (2nd)	**Avril Lavigne**	**"Complicated"**
**2003** (2nd)	Ashanti	"Foolish"
**2003** (2nd)	Minmi	"The Perfect Vision"
**2003** (2nd)	t.A.T.u.	"All The Things She Said"
**2003** (2nd)	The Music	"The People"
**2004** (3rd)	**Orange Range**	**"Shanghai Honey" (上海ハニー)**
**2004** (3rd)	Evanescence	"Bring Me to Life"
**2004** (3rd)	Good Charlotte	"The Anthem"
**2004** (3rd)	Halcali	"Strawberry Chips" (ストロベリーチップス)
**2004** (3rd)	Stacie Orrico	"Stuck"
**2005** (4th)	**Sambomaster**	**"Utsukushiki Ningen no Hibi" (美しき人間の日々)**
**2005** (4th)	Ciara featuring Petey Pablo	"Goodies"
**2005** (4th)	Franz Ferdinand	"Take Me Out"
**2005** (4th)	Nobodyknows	"Kokoro Odoru" (ココロオドル)
**2005** (4th)	Ashlee Simpson	"Pieces of Me"
**2006** (5th)	**Rihanna**	**"Pon De Replay"**
**2006** (5th)	Ayaka	"I Believe"
**2006** (5th)	Def Tech	"Konomama"
**2006** (5th)	High and Mighty Color	"Over"
**2006** (5th)	Kaiser Chiefs	"I Predict a Riot"
**2007** (6th)	**Ne-Yo**	**"So Sick"**
**2007** (6th)	Angela Aki	"This Love"
**2007** (6th)	Lily Allen	"Smile"
**2007** (6th)	Jinn	"Raion" (雷音)
**2007** (6th)	The View	"Wasted Little DJs"
**2008** (7th)	**Motohiro Hata**	**"Uroko" (鱗)**
**2008** (7th)	Erika	"Free"
**2008** (7th)	Mika	"Grace Kelly"
**2008** (7th)	Satomi Takasugi	"Tabibito" (旅人)
**2008** (7th)	Amy Winehouse	"Rehab"
**2009** (8th)	**Kimaguren**	**"Life"**
**2009** (8th)	Duffy	"Mercy"
**2009** (8th)	Girl Next Door	"Guzen no Kakuritsu" (偶然の確率)
**2009** (8th)	Miho Fukuhara	"Change"
**2009** (8th)	Katy Perry	"I Kissed a Girl"

=== 2010s ===
Year	Artist	Video
**2010** (9th)	**Big Bang**	**"Gara Gara Go!" (ガラガラ Go!!)**
**2010** (9th)	Mao Abe	"Itsu no Hi mo" (いつの日も)
**2010** (9th)	Keri Hilson featuring Kanye West and Ne-Yo	"Knock You Down"
**2010** (9th)	Taylor Swift	"You Belong With Me"
**2010** (9th)	The Telephones	"Monkey Discooooooo"
**2011** (10th)	**Justin Bieber featuring Ludacris**	**"Baby"**
**2011** (10th)	B.o.B featuring Bruno Mars	"Nothin' on You"
**2011** (10th)	Naoto Inti Raymi	"Takaramono (Kono Koe ga Naku Naru Made)" (タカラモノ～この声がなくなるまで～)
**2011** (10th)	Sendaime J Soul Brothers	"On Your Mark (Hikari no Kiseki)" (On Your Mark～ヒカリのキセキ～)
**2011** (10th)	Shinsei Kamattechan	"Michinaru Hou e" (美ちなる方へ)
**2012** (11th)	**2NE1**	**"I Am The Best"**
**2012** (11th)	CN Blue	"In My Head"
**2012** (11th)	James Blake	"Limit to Your Love"
**2012** (11th)	Kyary Pamyu Pamyu	"Tsukema Tsukeru" (つけまつける)
**2012** (11th)	LMFAO	"Party Rock Anthem"
**2013** (12th)	**Carly Rae Jepsen**	**"Call Me Maybe"**
**2013** (12th)	Fun featuring Janelle Monáe	"We Are Young"
**2013** (12th)	Generations	"Brave It Out"
**2013** (12th)	One Direction	"What Makes You Beautiful"
**2013** (12th)	Salu featuring H.Tefron	"The Girl On A Board"
**2014** (13th)	**Ariana Grande**	**"Baby I"**
**2015** (14th)	Japan	Video
**2015** (14th)	**Doberman Infinity**	**"Infinity"**
**2015** (14th)	International	Video
**2015** (14th)	**Years & Years**	**"King"**
**2016** (15th)	Japan	Video
**2016** (15th)	**Suchmos**	**"Mint"**
**2016** (15th)	International	Video
**2016** (15th)	**DNCE**	**"Cake by the Ocean"**
**2017** (16th)	Japan	Video
**2017** (16th)	**The Rampage from Exile Tribe**	**"Lightning"**
**2017** (16th)	International	Video
**2017** (16th)	**Shawn Mendes**	**"Treat You Better"**
**2018** (17th)	Japan	Video
**2018** (17th)	**Official Hige Dandism**	**"No Doubt"**
**2018** (17th)	International	Video
**2018** (17th)	**Marshmello, Anne-Marie**	**"Friends"**
**2019** (18th)	Japan	Video
**2019** (18th)	**King Gnu**	**"Hakujitsu"**
**2019** (18th)	International	Video
**2019** (18th)	**Billie Eilish**	**"Bad Guy"**

=== 2020s ===
Year	Category	Artist	Video
**2020** (19th)	Japan	Macaroni Enpitsu	"Koibito Gokko"
**2020** (19th)	International	Doja Cat	"Say So"
**2021** (20th)	Japan	Keyakizaka46	"Nagaredama"
**2021** (20th)	International	Olivia Rodrigo	"Drivers License"
**2022** (21st)	Japan	INI	"Rocketeer"
**2022** (21st)	International	Måneskin	"Supermodel"
**2023** (22nd)	Japan	Ano	"Chu, Tayōsei"
**2023** (22nd)	International	Jvke	"Golden Hour"

== See also ==
- MTV Video Music Award for Best New Artist
- MTV Europe Music Award for Best New Act
