= Chainsaw Man – The Movie: Reze Arc =

2025 anime film directed by Tatsuya Yoshihara

- Theatrical release poster

Japanese name
- Kanji: 劇場版 チェンソーマン レゼ篇
Transcriptions
- Revised Hepburn: Gekijō-ban Chensō Man Reze-hen
- Directed by: Tatsuya Yoshihara
- Screenplay by: Hiroshi Seko
- Based on: Chainsaw Man by Tatsuki Fujimoto
- Starring: Kikunosuke Toya; Reina Ueda; Fairouz Ai; Tomori Kusunoki; Shogo Sakata
- Cinematography: Teppei Ito
- Edited by: Masato Yoshitake
- Music by: Kensuke Ushio
- Production company: MAPPA
- Distributed by: Toho (Japan); Crunchyroll (through Sony Pictures Releasing; worldwide)
- Release date: September 19, 2025
- Running time: 100 minutes
- Country: Japan
- Language: Japanese
- Box office: $191.4 million

Chainsaw Man – The Movie: Reze Arc (Japanese: 劇場版 チェンソーマン レゼ篇, Hepburn: Gekijō-ban Chensō Man Reze-hen) is a 2025 Japanese animated film directed by Tatsuya Yoshihara, written by Hiroshi Seko, and produced by MAPPA. Based on Tatsuki Fujimoto's manga series Chainsaw Man, the film is a direct sequel to the first season of the anime television series and adapts events covered by the original manga's fifth and sixth volumes. It is storyboarded by Daisuke Tokudo, Masato Nakazono, Sōta Shigetsugu, Takuya Niinuma, Tatsuya Yoshihara and Yuzuru Tachikawa.

Chainsaw Man – The Movie: Reze Arc was released in Japan on September 19, 2025, by Toho. The film grossed $191.4 million worldwide, making it one of the highest-grossing Japanese films of all time, and received positive reviews from critics. The film was nominated for Best Animation Film at the 49th Japan Academy Film Prize.

== Plot ==
Following Katana Man's defeat, (Note: As depicted in the finale of Chainsaw Man) Public Safety division leader Makima assigns the fanatical Shark Fiend Beam as temporary partner to the devil hunter Denji (Chainsaw Man) while his regular partner Power has her excess blood drained. Makima takes Denji on a six-film movie marathon date; both dislike all but the final film in the program, which moves them to tears. During the date, Makima reassures Denji that he has a heart capable of feeling.

Denji is caught in a storm while patrolling and takes shelter in a phone booth, where he meets a girl named Reze and later visits her at the café where she works. Her behavior leads Denji to think she has feelings for him, though he is conflicted over his simultaneous attraction to Makima. Meanwhile, devil hunter Aki Hayakawa is assigned the Angel Devil as his new partner, whose touch shortens the lifespan of mortals. Angel's laziness and apathy towards humans become sources of mutual tension.

Denji and Reze sneak into her school at night, where they skinny dip in the outdoor pool and she teaches him to swim. While separated from Denji, Reze is suddenly ambushed by an assassin who aims to torture her to control Denji; she feigns weakness before quickly killing the man and allying with his partnered devil, the Typhoon Devil. The day after, while watching fireworks at a festival, Reze asks Denji to run away with her. He hesitates, leading to her realization that there's another woman in Denji's life. Reze then kisses him, bites out his tongue, and incapacitates him revealing her true identity as the Bomb Devil.

Beam retreats with the injured Denji to a Public Safety office, where they find Aki and Angel; the four escape by car as Reze slaughters the other hunters. As she chases them through the streets, a revived Denji retaliates but is easily defeated. Aki and the Violence Fiend fend off Reze, but the Typhoon Devil arrives to assist her. Denji is revived by Angel using the blood of a nearby casualty and Beam suggests using his chainsaw abilities tactically in the fight, giving Denji the idea to ride Beam's shark form in the battle. Amidst the fight, the Typhoon Devil's winds pull in Angel before Aki catches his shirt. Intent on dying, Angel begs him to let go but Aki secures him by grabbing his bare hand, taking two months off his remaining two-year lifespan.

Denji and Beam kill the Typhoon Devil, though Reze severely injures Beam. The confrontation leads them to the coastline, where Denji uses his chains to bind Reze to him and jumps into the water, preventing her from using her abilities as they sink to the seabed. All three wash ashore the following morning, where Reze concedes that her mission has failed and she never had feelings for Denji. He replies that if that were truly the case, she would not have taught him to swim. Denji then reciprocates Reze's offer to run away together and asks her to meet at the café the next day.

In the aftermath of the battle, devil hunter Kishibe informs Aki that Reze was a Soviet agent experimented on as a child. Reze prepares to board a train before having a change of heart and deciding to meet with Denji. However, she is intercepted by Makima and attacked by Angel in the alley leading to the café. As she bleeds out, Reze wonders why she did not try to kill Denji when they first met and admits never having gone to school either.

In a post-credits scene, Denji holds a flower bouquet and appears depressed as Reze never showed up. Power arrives instead and asks if the flowers are a gift for her. He considers giving her the bouquet before eating it instead, causing them to squabble.

== Voice cast ==
Character	Japanese	English
Denji (デンジ)	Kikunosuke Toya	Ryan Colt Levy
Reze (レゼ)	Reina Ueda	Alexis Tipton
Makima (マキマ)	Tomori Kusunoki	Suzie Yeung
Aki Hayakawa (早川アキ, Hayakawa Aki)	Shogo Sakata	Reagan Murdock
Beam (ビーム, Bīmu)	Natsuki Hanae	Derick Snow
Angel Devil (天使の悪魔, Tenshi no Akuma)	Maaya Uchida	Casey Mongillo
Power (パワー, Pawā)	Fairouz Ai	Sarah Wiedenheft
Violence Fiend (暴力の魔人, Bōryoku no Majin)	Yūya Uchida	Josh Bangle
Typhoon Devil (台風の悪魔, Taifū no Akuma)	Eri Kitamura	Reshel Mae
Nomo (野茂)	Kenji Akabane	Ryan Negrón
Kishibe (岸辺)	Kenjiro Tsuda	Jason Douglas
Kobeni Higashiyama (東山 コベニ, Higashiyama Kobeni)	Karin Takahashi	Bryn Apprill
Pochita (ポチタ)	Shiori Izawa	Lindsay Seidel
Fox Devil (狐の悪魔, Kitsune no Akuma)	Yūko Kaida	Natalie Van Sistine

== Production ==
On December 17, 2023, at the Jump Festa '24 event, an anime film entitled Chainsaw Man – The Movie: Reze Arc (劇場版 チェンソーマン レゼ篇, Gekijō-ban Chensō Man Reze-hen), was announced. The film was announced again on December 22, 2024, at the Jump Festa '25 event for a 2025 premiere in Japan and Toho as the distributor.

It was announced that the cast from the anime series would return to their respective roles for the film, but there were some staff changes. Tatsuya Yoshihara was confirmed to direct the film, replacing Ryu Nakayama, who directed the first season of the anime. Sota Shigetsugu joined the production as Action Director, the role Yoshihara served in for the first season of the anime.

The majority of the core staff, however, remained unchanged, with Kazutaka Sugiyama returning as character designer. Sugiyama stated on X, formerly known as Twitter, that he, Yoshihara, and other core staff members collaborated to modify the character designs for the film to better reflect the style of Tatsuki Fujimoto's manga series Chainsaw Man. In turn, the film's visual approach differed from the anime's first season, with the majority of the audience responding positively to the film's new style.

== Music ==
Kensuke Ushio returned from the anime series to compose the film's music. Kenshi Yonezu performed the film's theme song "Iris Out" while the ending theme song is "Jane Doe" by Yonezu and Hikaru Utada. Yonezu also returned to the franchise after previously providing "Kick Back", the opening theme song for the first season of the anime.

== Release ==
Distributed in Japan by Toho, the film was theatrically released in the country on September 19, 2025, and screened in 75 countries in standard and IMAX formats, with screenings in the MX4D, 4DX, and Dolby Cinema formats exclusively releasing in selected cinemas on October 4, 2025. Originally set to be distributed internationally by Sony Pictures Releasing via Columbia Pictures, the film's international distribution rights were transferred to Crunchyroll, with Sony Pictures Releasing retaining its international distribution rights for the film and releasing it in theaters in more than 80 countries from September 24, 2025, and released the film in the United States and other non-Asian markets from October 24, 2025, moving up 5 days from its original release date of October 29, 2025. The film was confirmed to release in IMAX, 4DX, Dolby Cinema and RealD 3D premium formats worldwide, with the latter being released outside of Japan and Asia. Both the subbed and dubbed versions of the film were released on digital platforms by Sony Pictures Home Entertainment on December 9, 2025.

== Reception ==
=== Box office ===
The film sold over 272,000 tickets for over ¥420 million (US$2.8 million) in its opening day in Japan. It sold 807,000 tickets for ¥1.251 billion (US$8.46 million) in its opening weekend, debuting at first place in the Japanese box office, which was previously topped for nine weeks straight by Demon Slayer: Kimetsu no Yaiba – The Movie: Infinity Castle. In South Korea, the film topped the box office for a second consecutive weekend, earning approximately US$1.8 million. The film topped the U.S. opening weekend in 3,003 North American theaters, earning US$18 million at the box office. According to Polygon, the film's U.S. opening weekend brought in approximately US$9.7 million and helped push its global box-office over the US$100 million mark. According to The Numbers, the film grossed $43.4 million in the United States and Canada, $147.9 million in other territories, and $191.4 million worldwide. In Japan, the film reached ¥10.81 billion by March 29, 2026, according to Kogyo Tsushinsha. Sony reported that, in territories handled by Sony Pictures and Crunchyroll, the film had grossed $43 million in North America and $75 million internationally, for a total of $118 million as of March 31, 2026.

=== Critical response ===
On the review aggregator website Rotten Tomatoes, 96% of 49 critics' reviews are positive, with an average rating of 8.1/10. The website's consensus reads: "Revving up the carnage while maintaining a perversely sweet emotional core, Chainsaw Man's big screen debut is a bloody feast rendered in eye-popping animation." Metacritic, which uses a weighted average, assigned the film a score of 71 out of 100, based on 13 critics, indicating "generally favorable" reviews. Audiences polled by CinemaScore gave the film an average grade of "A" on an A+ to F scale.

Richard Eisenbeis of Anime News Network graded the film an A, praising its animation, visuals, action sequences, music, and story, while noting that Denji and Reze's deep bittersweet love story is what makes the film "worth watching". IndieWire writer Wilson Chapman gave the film a B+, commending the animation, action sequences, characters, story, and voice acting. He concluded that the film "probably won't have the same effect on most viewers, but it's one of the best films in the recent crop of anime TV expansions, and its bittersweet teen love story is certainly potent enough to make you cry." Rafael Motamayor of /Film wrote that the film was "the best rom-com of 2025".

=== Accolades ===
Award	Date of ceremony	Category	Recipient(s)	Result	Ref.
Abema Anime Trend Awards	December 26, 2025	Anime Song Award	"Iris Out" (by Kenshi Yonezu)	Won	
AnimaniA Awards	July 31, 2026	Best Movie: Cinematic Release	Chainsaw Man – The Movie: Reze Arc	Nominated	
AnimaniA Awards	July 31, 2026	Best Anime Song	"Jane Doe" (by Kenshi Yonezu and Hikaru Utada)	Nominated	
Anime Grand Prix	July 13, 2026	Best Theme Song	"Iris Out" (by Kenshi Yonezu)	2nd place	
Anime Grand Prix	July 13, 2026	Best Theme Song	"Jane Doe" (by Kenshi Yonezu and Hikaru Utada)	7th place	
Anime Grand Prix	July 13, 2026	Best Voice Actor	Reina Ueda	3rd place	
Annie Awards	February 21, 2026	Best Direction – Feature	Tatsuya Yoshihara	Nominated	
Crunchyroll Anime Awards	May 23, 2026	Film of the Year	Chainsaw Man – The Movie: Reze Arc	Nominated	
Crunchyroll Anime Awards	May 23, 2026	Best Anime Song	"Iris Out" (by Kenshi Yonezu)	Won	
Crunchyroll Anime Awards	May 23, 2026	Best Anime Song	"Jane Doe" (by Kenshi Yonezu and Hikaru Utada)	Nominated	
Crunchyroll Anime Awards	May 23, 2026	Best Score	Kensuke Ushio	Nominated	
Crunchyroll Anime Awards	May 23, 2026	Best Voice Artist Performance (Japanese)	Kikunosuke Toya (as Denji)	Nominated	
Crunchyroll Anime Awards	May 23, 2026	Best Voice Artist Performance (Japanese)	Reina Ueda (as Reze)	Nominated	
Crunchyroll Anime Awards	May 23, 2026	Best Voice Artist Performance (English)	Alexis Tipton (as Reze)	Nominated	
Crunchyroll Anime Awards	May 23, 2026	Best Voice Artist Performance (Castilian Spanish)	Cristina Peña (as Reze)	Nominated	
Crunchyroll Anime Awards	May 23, 2026	Best Voice Artist Performance (French)	Clara Soares (as Reze)	Nominated	
Crunchyroll Anime Awards	May 23, 2026	Best Voice Artist Performance (German)	Laurine Betz (as Reze)	Nominated	
Crunchyroll Anime Awards	May 23, 2026	Best Voice Artist Performance (Hindi)	Heena Malik (as Reze)	Nominated	
Crunchyroll Anime Awards	May 23, 2026	Best Voice Artist Performance (Italian)	Mosè Singh (as Denji)	Won	
Crunchyroll Anime Awards	May 23, 2026	Best Voice Artist Performance (Latin Spanish)	Jessica Ángeles (as Reze)	Nominated	
Golden Tomato Awards	January 13, 2026	Fan Favorite Animated Movie	Chainsaw Man – The Movie: Reze Arc	Nominated	
Golden Trailer Awards	May 28, 2026	Best Foreign Animation/Family	"Vroom Vroom" (AV Squad)	Nominated	
Hanteo Music Awards	February 15, 2026	Special Award – OST	"Iris Out" (by Kenshi Yonezu)	Nominated	
Hanteo Music Awards	February 15, 2026	Special Award – OST	"Jane Doe" (by Kenshi Yonezu and Hikaru Utada)	Nominated	
Harvey Awards	October 9, 2026	Best Adaptation from Comic Book/Graphic Novel	Chainsaw Man – The Movie: Reze Arc	Nominated	
Japan Academy Film Prize	March 13, 2026	Best Animation Film	Chainsaw Man – The Movie: Reze Arc	Nominated	
Japan Expo Awards	July 10, 2026	Daruma for Best Feature Film	Chainsaw Man – The Movie: Reze Arc	Won	
Japan Expo Awards	July 10, 2026	Daruma for Best Original Soundtrack	Chainsaw Man – The Movie: Reze Arc	Nominated	
Japan Gold Disc Award	March 11, 2026	Best 3 Songs by Download	"Iris Out" (by Kenshi Yonezu)	Won	
Japan Gold Disc Award	March 11, 2026	Song of the Year by Streaming (Japan)	"Iris Out" (by Kenshi Yonezu)	Won	
Japan Gold Disc Award	March 11, 2026	Best 5 Songs by Streaming	"Iris Out" (by Kenshi Yonezu)	Won	
Manga Barcelona Awards	December 5, 2026	Best Anime Movie Premiere	Chainsaw Man – The Movie: Reze Arc	Pending	
MTV Video Music Awards Japan	October 29, 2026	Song of the Year	"Iris Out" (by Kenshi Yonezu)	Won	
MTV Video Music Awards Japan	October 29, 2026	Best Collaboration Video (Japan)	"Jane Doe" (by Kenshi Yonezu and Hikaru Utada)	Won	
Music Awards Japan	June 13, 2026	Song of the Year	"Iris Out" (by Kenshi Yonezu)	Nominated	
Music Awards Japan	June 13, 2026	Top Global Hit from Japan	"Iris Out" (by Kenshi Yonezu)	Nominated	
Music Awards Japan	June 13, 2026	Top Global Hit from Japan	"Jane Doe" (by Kenshi Yonezu and Hikaru Utada)	Nominated	
Music Awards Japan	June 13, 2026	Best J-Pop Song	"Iris Out" (by Kenshi Yonezu)	Won	
Music Awards Japan	June 13, 2026	Best J-Pop Song	"Jane Doe" (by Kenshi Yonezu and Hikaru Utada)	Nominated	
Music Awards Japan	June 13, 2026	Best Anime Song	"Iris Out" (by Kenshi Yonezu)	Nominated	
Music Awards Japan	June 13, 2026	Best Anime Song	"Jane Doe" (by Kenshi Yonezu and Hikaru Utada)	Nominated	
Music Awards Japan	June 13, 2026	Top Japanese Song in Asia	"Iris Out" (by Kenshi Yonezu)	Won	
Music Awards Japan	June 13, 2026	Top Japanese Song in Asia	"Jane Doe" (by Kenshi Yonezu and Hikaru Utada)	Nominated	
Music Awards Japan	June 13, 2026	Top Japanese Song in Europe	"Iris Out" (by Kenshi Yonezu)	Won	
Music Awards Japan	June 13, 2026	Top Japanese Song in North America	"Iris Out" (by Kenshi Yonezu)	Won	
Music Awards Japan	June 13, 2026	Top Japanese Song in Latin America	"Iris Out" (by Kenshi Yonezu)	Won	
Music Awards Japan	June 13, 2026	Best Soundtrack Album	Chainsaw Man – The Movie: Reze Arc Original Soundtrack -Summer's End-	Nominated	
Music Awards Japan	June 13, 2026	Best Original Score for Cinema	Kensuke Ushio	Nominated	
Newtype Anime Awards	October 17, 2026	Best Picture (Film)	Chainsaw Man – The Movie: Reze Arc	4th place	
Puerto Rico Critics Association	January 2, 2026	Best Animated Feature	Chainsaw Man – The Movie: Reze Arc	Nominated	
Reiwa Anisong Awards	January 17, 2026	Best Work Award	"Iris Out" (by Kenshi Yonezu)	Nominated	
Saturn Awards	March 8, 2026	Best International Animated Film	Chainsaw Man – The Movie: Reze Arc	Nominated	
Tokyo Anime Award Festival	March 16, 2026	Best Art Direction	Yusuke Takeda	Won	
Tokyo Anime Award Festival	March 16, 2026	Best Music	Kenshi Yonezu	Won	
