= 2023 MTV Video Music Awards Japan =

22nd edition of the MTV Video Music Awards Japan held in 2023

- Date: November 22, 2023
- Location: K-Arena, Yokohama, Kanagawa
- Country: Japan
- Hosted by: Ryota Yamasato; Sachi Fujii
- Most awards: Mrs. Green Apple (4)
- Website: vmaj.jp

Television/radio coverage
- Network: MTV Japan

The 2023 MTV Video Music Awards Japan were held at K-Arena, Yokohama, Kanagawa Prefecture on November 22, 2023. The show was hosted by Ryota Yamasato and Sachi Fujii.

== Winners and nominees ==
The winners for all categories were announced on October 27, 2023, except Video of the Year, which announced at the ceremony.

Winners are listed first and highlighted in bold.

Video of the Year
**Mrs. Green Apple – "Que Sera Sera"**; 10-Feet – "Dai Zero Kan"; Aiko – "Hateshinai Futari"; Aina the End – "Red:Birthmark"; Ano – "Chu, Tayōsei"; Atarashii Gakko! – "Otonablue"; Bad Hop – "Champion Road"; Hinatazaka46 – "Am I Ready?"; Jvke – "Golden Hour"; Macaroni Empitsu – "Kanashimi wa Basu ni Notte"; Millennium Parade and Ringo Sheena – "Work"; Mrs. Green Apple – "Magic"; NiziU – "Paradise"; Nogizaka46 – "Ohitori-sama Tengoku"; Olivia Rodrigo – "Vampire"; Sakurazaka46 – "Star Over!"; Sam Smith and Kim Petras – "Unholy"; Stray Kids – "Case 143"; Tomohisa Yamashita – "Sweet Vision"; Yoasobi – "Idol"
Best Solo Artist Video (Japan)	Best Solo Artist Video (International)
**Aiko – "Hateshinai Futari"**	Olivia Rodrigo – "Vampire"
Best Group Video (Japan)	Best Group Video (International)
**Nogizaka46 – "Ohitori-sama Tengoku"**	Stray Kids – "Case 143"
Best New Artist Video (Japan)	Best New Artist Video (International)
**Ano – "Chu, Tayōsei"**	Jvke – "Golden Hour"
Best Collaboration Video (Japan)	Best Collaboration Video (International)
**Millennium Parade and Ringo Sheena – "Work"**	Sam Smith and Kim Petras – "Unholy"
Best Rock Video	Best Alternative Video
**10-Feet – "Dai Zero Kan"**	Mrs. Green Apple – "Magic"
Best Pop Video	Best R&B Video
**NiziU – "Paradise"**	Tomohisa Yamashita – "Sweet Vision"
Best Hip Hop Video	Best Dance Video
**Bad Hop – "Champion Road"**	Sakurazaka46 – "Star Over!"
Best Storytelling Video	Best Animation Video
**Macaroni Empitsu – "Kanashimi wa Basu ni Notte"**	Yoasobi – "Idol"
Best Art Direction Video	Best Visual Effect
**Aina the End – "Red:Birthmark"**	Mrs. Green Apple – "Que Sera Sera"
Best Cinematography	Best Choreography
**Hinatazaka46 – "Am I Ready?"**	Atarashii Gakko! – "Otonablue"

=== Special awards ===
Artist of the Year	Song of the Year
Mrs. Green Apple	Yoasobi – "Idol"
Album of the Year	Group of the Year
Aiko – Ima no Futari o Otagai ga Miteru	Be:First
Global Icon Award	Best Asia Celebrity
Cha Eun-woo	Bright
Best Asia Group	Best Buzz Award
The Boyz	NewJeans
Upcoming Dance & Vocal Group
DXTEEN	Lil League
Rising Star Award	Daisy Bell Award
Wolf Howl Harmony	Marasy, Jin and Shōta Horie (Kemu) featuring Kagamine Rin – "Shinjinrui"
