= List of Chainsaw Man episodes =

Key visual for the series

Chainsaw Man is an anime television series based on the manga series Chainsaw Man by Tatsuki Fujimoto. Produced by MAPPA, the anime series was announced in December 2020. It adapts the first 38 chapters of the manga in 12 episodes. The series was directed by Ryū Nakayama, with series composition and scripts by Hiroshi Seko. Makoto Nakazono and Tatsuya Yoshihara respectively served as chief episode director and action director, with character designs by Kazutaka Sugiyama and demon designs by Kiyotaka Oshiyama. The series' music was composed by Kensuke Ushio.

The series follows the story of Denji, an impoverished young man who makes a contract that fuses his body with that of a dog-like Devil named Pochita, granting him the ability to transform parts of his body into chainsaws. Denji eventually joins the Public Safety Devil Hunters, a government agency focused on fighting Devils whenever they become a threat to Japan.

The series aired on TV Tokyo and its TXN affiliates from October 12 to December 28, 2022. (Note: TV Tokyo listed the series as airing every Tuesday at 24:00, which is effectively Wednesday at midnight JST.) The opening theme song is "Kick Back", performed by Kenshi Yonezu, while each episode features a different ending theme song. (Note: All twelve ending theme songs, listed in alphabetical order: "Chainsaw Blood" by Vaundy; "Chu, Tayōsei" (ちゅ、多様性。) by Ano; "Dainōteki na Rendezvous" (大脳的なランデブー) by Kanaria; "Deep Down" by Aimer; "Dogland" by People 1; "Fight Song" (ファイトソング) by Eve; "First Death" by TK from Ling Tosite Sigure; "Hawatari Ni-Oku Centi" (刃渡り2億センチ) by Maximum the Hormone (also used as an insert song); "In the Back Room" (インザバックルーム) by Syudou; "Jōzai" (錠剤) by Tooboe; "Violence" (バイオレンス) by Queen Bee; "Zanki" (残機) by Zutomayo) Crunchyroll licensed the series outside of East Asia and began streaming an English dub on October 25, 2022. Medialink licensed the series in Asia-Pacific.

== Episodes ==
No.	Title	Directed by	Chief animation directed by (Note: Production staff information is taken from the ending credits of each episode.)	Ending theme song	Original release date
1	"Dog & Chainsaw"; Transliteration: "Inu to Chensō" (Japanese: 犬とチェンソー)	Ryū Nakayama	Kazutaka Sugiyama	"Chainsaw Blood" by Vaundy	October 12, 2022
16-year-old Denji has been burdened with a massive debt left behind by his deceased father, who committed suicide. To repay the debt, he works as a Devil Hunter with Pochita, the dog-resembling Chainsaw Devil. After finishing a job for a yakuza boss, Denji tells Pochita about his dream to live a peaceful life and settle down with a partner. The boss takes Denji to an abandoned warehouse for a job, where he reveals his group has allied themselves with the Zombie Devil, who has Denji dismembered and seemingly killed. Denji's blood seeps into Pochita's mouth, and Denji has a vision of Pochita telling him that he will become Denji's heart in exchange for seeing Denji live out his dream. Whole again, Denji confronts the Zombie Devil. Pulling Pochita's pull string, which is now on his chest, he can transform into a Devil-Human hybrid form that allows him to grow chainsaws out of his head and arms, which he uses to kill the Zombie Devil and the yakuza zombies. The next morning, a group of Public Safety Devil Hunters finds the carnage. Their leader, Makima, hugs Denji after asking her to do so, causing him to revert to his human form. She offers to keep Denji alive as a human and feed him, much to his delight.
2	"Arrival in Tokyo"; Transliteration: "Tōkyō Tōchaku" (Japanese: 東京到着)	Directed by : Tōko Yatabe & Makoto Nakazono; Storyboarded by : Tōko Yatabe	Kazutaka Sugiyama, Hiroyuki Saita & Kiminori Itō	"Zanki" by Zutomayo (Note: The song is also known in English as "Time Left".)	October 19, 2022
Denji and Makima arrive at the Devil Hunters Headquarters in Tokyo after eating in the rest area. Denji wishes to team up with Makima, but she introduces him to Aki Hayakawa, a Public Safety Devil Hunter who takes Denji out on patrol. Aki and Denji get into a fight during the patrol, with Aki telling Denji he should quit for his own safety. However, Denji believes it's because Aki also has feelings for Makima. Denji and Aki return to Makima, where she tells them to work together. The next day, Denji and Aki are on a mission as they spot a Fiend, whom Denji kills using an axe. After Aki lambasts Denji for taking his job casually, Denji realizes that he needs a goal to achieve. He then decides that his goal is to fondle some breasts. Back in the headquarters, per Aki's advice, Makima introduces Denji's new partner, named Power, and warns him that Power is a Fiend. Denji is surprised and wonders if Fiends can be Devil Hunters. After Makima explains the Fiends and their soon-to-be-dissolved experimental team, Denji goes out with Power, who proves to be annoying. Denji assumes that Aki has set him up and is trying to get him fired. As they search for devils, Power smells blood and runs when she spots a Sea Cucumber Devil. She jumps from the building and effortlessly kills the devil using a hammer formed with blood.
3	"Meowy's Whereabouts"; Transliteration: "Nyāko no Yukue" (Japanese: ニャーコの行方)	Hironori Tanaka	Takako Shimizu, Hiroyuki Saita & Kazutaka Sugiyama	"Hawatari Ni-Oku Centi" by Maximum the Hormone (Note: The song is also known in English as "2-Hundred-Million-Centimeter-Long Blades".)	October 26, 2022
In the aftermath of killing the Sea Cucumber Devil, Makima has arrived. The devil belonged to a civilian hunter, and they shouldn't have killed it. Makima questions whether Power is cut out to be a Devil Hunter, prompting Power to try to deflect blame onto Denji. Makima stops them from fighting and orders them to work together. Afterwards, Denji starts to wonder if he can touch Power's breasts, which she picks up on. She tells him that she will let him do that in exchange for killing Bat Devil, who kidnapped her cat Meowy. Denji agrees, and the two get permission to leave for a few hours to track and kill the devil. They travel to an abandoned house, where Power knocks Denji unconscious, revealing that she plans to feed him to the injured Bat Devil in exchange for the release of her cat. Bat Devil squeezes some blood out of Denji, which regrows his arm, but finds that it tastes bad; thus, he refuses to release the cat, instead swallowing it and Power before heading towards a city to feed more. However, Denji manages to grab his leg and crash them into the city by transforming into his chainsaw form. They have a long and destructive fight, but Denji eventually kills the Bat Devil.
4	"Rescue"; Transliteration: "Kyūshutsu" (Japanese: 救出)	Tatsuya Yoshihara	Kazutaka Sugiyama & Riki Matsuura	"Jōzai" by Tooboe (Note: The song is also known in English as "Tablet".)	November 2, 2022
After defeating the Bat Devil, a surviving Power is left stunned at Denji's tenacity and permits him to fondle her breasts. However, the Leech Devil suddenly arrives, severing and eating Denji's arm. Denji tries to transform into the Chainsaw Man, but his lack of blood from the previous fight prevents a full transformation, growing only a small chainsaw on his head. Even still, Denji pushes forward with his dream in mind and battles Leech, inflicting some damage. However, he is overpowered, and as he is about to be killed, Aki arrives and obliterates the Leech with the massive Fox Devil. In the debriefing, Aki explains that he managed to reattach Denji's arm after a blood transfusion and explains about the Fox Devil, with whom he created a contract by offering a piece of his flesh. Aki then says that both Denji and Power may be disposed of, but offers Denji compliance with his rules in exchange for saving them. Denji agrees, so Aki gets Makima's approval to keep them alive. However, this means Power also resides in Aki's apartment, resulting in chaos. Power sticks to her promise with Denji that night, much to his delight.
5	"Gun Devil"; Transliteration: "Jū no Akuma" (Japanese: 銃の悪魔)	Directed by : Yōsuke Takada; Storyboarded by : Tomomi Kamiya	Takako Shimizu, Hiroyuki Saita & Kazutaka Sugiyama	"In the Back Room" by Syudou	November 9, 2022
Denji's experience of fondling Power's breasts is underwhelming, and he is left in a stupor because of it. Makima insists that it is a result of Denji not knowing his partner well enough and proceeds to tease Denji sexually, allowing him to touch her breasts, rendering him speechless. She then offers to grant him any wish he wants if he kills the Gun Devil, a powerful beast responsible for an international incident that claimed 1.2 million lives, including Aki's family. Using a chunk from the Gun Devil lightly magnetized to other fragments, Public Safety discovers a devil hiding in a hotel and sends Aki's team - consisting of Denji, Power, Aki's longtime friend Himeno, the timid Kobeni Higashiyama, and the headstrong Hirokazu Arai - to neutralize it. To motivate the rookies, Himeno offers a kiss on the cheek to whoever slays the devil first, offering Denji a French kiss if he succeeds, delighting him. Before they enter, Aki remembers when he first met Himeno in a massive graveyard for the Gun Devil's victims, with her proclaiming her previous five partners had all died and asking him to stay alive. On the eighth floor, the team finds a walking head, which Power promptly kills, as Himeno reveals her contract with the Ghost Devil in exchange for her right eye, which allows her to use a powerful, invisible hand. However, they soon realize that they're trapped on the floor.
6	"Kill Denji"; Transliteration: "Denji o Korose" (Japanese: デンジを殺せ)	Shun Enokido	Hiroyuki Saita	"Dainōteki na Rendezvous" by Kanaria (Note: The song is also known in English simply as "Rendezvous".)	November 16, 2022
The Devil Hunters look for ways to escape, but Aki notices all the clocks on the floor have stopped completely, meaning they have been entirely cut off from the outside world. As such, they begin collecting resources to survive. After Denji notices Himeno smoking the same brand of cigarettes as Aki, she reveals that she made him begin smoking after he avenged her from the angry girlfriend of one of her deceased partners, who slapped her. She also reveals she knows Aki wants to live a long life despite being a Devil Hunter. Aki returns to the room and reveals that the previous devil they killed has grown larger. The monstrous mass of flesh known as the Eternity Devil offers them their freedom from the floor if they feed Denji to it. Kobeni attacks Denji, but Himeno and Aki defend him, stating they won't kill him. Time passes, and as Kobeni and Hirokazu's fear grows, the Devil grows even larger, flipping the entire floor vertically. A desperate Kobeni charges towards Denji with a knife, but Aki intervenes and gets stabbed instead, devastating Himeno. While Power tries to stop his bleeding, Denji deduces the Devil is afraid of his chainsaws, so he leaps towards its mouth, ready to shred its insides.
7	"The Taste of a Kiss"; Transliteration: "Kisu no Oaji" (Japanese: キスの味)	Directed by : Makoto Nakazono; Storyboarded by : Makoto Nakazono, Keiichirō Watanabe & Ryū Nakayama	Riki Matsuura, Kazutaka Sugiyama, Takako Shimizu & Shun	"Chu, Tayōsei" by Ano (Note: The song is also known in English as "All Kinds of Kisses".)	November 23, 2022
Denji begins mercilessly shredding the Eternity Devil's insides, but the devil constantly rips him to shreds as well. However, Denji constantly regenerates by feeding off the Devil's blood. After seeing Denji's insanity, Himeno remembers when she visited her previous partners' graves with her mentor, Kishibe, who told her that most sane hunters ultimately die, and exclaimed that Aki was slightly crazy for wanting to kill the Gun Devil. In a restaurant, she unsuccessfully tries to deter Aki from killing it by offering him to go private. Back in the present, a relieved Himeno realizes that someone as insane as Denji can kill the Gun Devil without risking Aki's life. After three days, a relentless Denji finally breaks down the Devil, who offers its heart to end its suffering. After killing it, the group goes to a restaurant to get to know each other. Despite the group having fun, Kobeni becomes terrified after Fushi, a veteran member, proves that hunters' lives are lost incredibly often after he casually mentions his rookie was recently killed. Himeno gets incredibly drunk and rewards Denji with a kiss, but she vomits in his mouth. Denji passes out, so Himeno carries him to her apartment, where she, still wasted, offers to have sex with him.
8	"Gunfire"; Transliteration: "Jūsei" (Japanese: 銃声)	Directed by : Shōta Goshozono & Takeru Satō; Storyboarded by : Shōta Goshozono	Sōta Yamazaki, Kazutaka; Sugiyama & Shun	"First Death" by TK from Ling Tosite Sigure	November 30, 2022
Denji refuses Himeno's sexual advances, remembering the night before when Makima gave him an indirect kiss through a lollipop. The next morning, Himeno forgets everything that happened in her drunken state and asks to become friends with Denji. Denji agrees to help Himeno get together with Aki if she can help him with Makima. Meanwhile, the Gun Devil coordinates an attack to exterminate the Tokyo Public Safety Devil Hunters, as they are narrowing in on his location. As civilians throughout Tokyo use illegally obtained guns to kill Devil Hunters, Makima is shot while en route to Kyoto. At a cafe, Denji is shot in the head by the grandson of the yakuza handler he killed earlier in the series, while Himeno is shot in the chest. Aki tries to have the Fox Devil eat the man, but the man reveals himself as a devil-human Hybrid with the Katana Devil. Aki defeats the man, Samurai Sword, with the Curse Devil's powers, but loses to him after his partner, Akane Sawatari, helps him up. A dying Himeno gives up her body to the Ghost Devil, who manifests in plain sight and overwhelms Samurai Sword. Akane uses the Snake Devil to consume most of the Ghost Devil, seemingly killing it and saving Samurai Sword, while Himeno has disappeared entirely.
9	"From Kyoto"; Transliteration: "Kyōto Yori" (Japanese: 京都より)	Directed by : Takahiro Kaneko; Storyboarded by : Hironori Tanaka	Hiroyuki Saita & Takako Shimizu	"Deep Down" by Aimer	December 7, 2022
After being eaten by the Snake Devil, one of the Ghost Devil's hands pulls Denji's ripcord, reviving him. He faces off against Samurai Sword but is ultimately sliced in half. Akane, Samurai Sword, and their associates move Denji's torso to a van. Makima is revealed to have survived and arrives in Kyoto after killing her attackers. Upon meeting Yutaro Kurose and Michiko Tendo, the Public Safety employees in Kyoto, she asks them to assemble death-row inmates at a high-altitude temple. Back at the van, members of Akane's gang start to spontaneously explode until only Akane and Samurai Sword are left standing. Akane tries to confirm Makima's death and realizes that she is the cause of the spontaneous explosions. At the same time, Makima asks the inmates to recite the names of the gang members, in doing so, performing a ritual that leaves both the gang members and the inmates dead. Kobeni appears at the van and manages to fight off Akane and Samurai Sword (now in human form) with a knife and a gun. After they flee in the van, Kobeni apologizes to Denji for trying to kill him and cries over Hirokazu's death and how the job is taking an intense toll on her mental state. Now back in Tokyo, Makima receives an update from Madoka (who promptly resigns) that Special Divisions 1 through 4 will be merging after suffering heavy losses, from which mostly only non-human members survived. Makima refuses to respond when asked if she anticipated the recent attacks and leaves with Kurose and Tendo.
10	"Bruised & Battered"; Transliteration: "Motto Boroboro" (Japanese: もっとボロボロ)	Tatsuya Yoshihara	Kazutaka Sugiyama, Sōta Yamazaki, Yosuke Yajima, Takako Shimizu, Riki Matsuura & Shun	"Dogland" by People 1	December 14, 2022
Denji and Power visit Aki in the hospital and tell him that only Kobeni and Madoka survived the assault from their unit, besides them. Aki mourns Himeno's death before Kurose and Tendo arrive to request his report and ask whether he wants to continue his service. He says he wants to avenge his family and also Himeno, so Kurose and Tendo demand he form a new contract with a more powerful Devil since the Fox Devil now refuses to work with Aki. Aki is then visited by Himeno's sister, who gives him letters Himeno sent home about her trying to save Aki from this job. Makima takes Denji and Power to the cemetery to meet with a Devil Hunter from Division 1, Himeno and Aki's trainer, who is revealed to be Kishibe. This self-proclaimed strongest devil hunter begins training them to become stronger by repeatedly killing Denji and nearly killing Power. After an entire day and dozens of deaths, Kishibe sends them home. The next day, Denji and Power carefully plan to trap Kishibe, but he effortlessly beats them again. Tendo and Kurose take Aki to a lock-up where all the captured devils are kept alive, and Aki is told to make a contract with the Future Devil.
11	"Mission Start"; Transliteration: "Sakusen Kaishi" (Japanese: 作戦開始)	Directed by : Makoto Nakazono & Takeru Satō; Storyboarded by : Makoto Nakazono	Sōta Yamazaki, Hiroyuki Saita, Kazutaka; Sugiyama, Takako Shimizu & Shun	"Violence" by Queen Bee	December 21, 2022
The Future Devil gives Aki his power without asking anything in return because he foresaw a magnificent death in his future. Kishibe's training proves fruitful, as he ends up with a single scratch. He tells Denji and Power that the entire Special Division 4 and other Public Safety Divisions are planning a massive raid on the yakuza branch affiliated with the Gun Devil. Makima meets with the Tokyo head of the yakuza and learns the names of every single collaborator of the Gun Devil within the yakuza, using the knowledge to eliminate several from her current whereabouts. While the remaining members of the Special Division enter the yakuza hideout, Kishibe holds off any police or regular Devil Hunters from entering, explaining that the Special Division is composed almost entirely of non-humans now; he also tells them of each of their abilities. The Devil Hunters fight through the horde in the basement filled with zombies left behind from the deal the former yakuza head made with the Zombie Devil. While Power, the Shark Fiend, the Violence Fiend, the Spider Devil, and the Angel Devil stay below to clear the horde, Aki and Denji head up to deal with Akane and Samurai Sword. Aki encounters Akane first, who uses her Snake Devil to regurgitate the Ghost Devil and turn it against Aki. The Future Devil's foresight ability allows Aki to fight the Ghost Devil off before he is overwhelmed by its countless arms and held in a chokehold by it.
12	"Katana vs. Chainsaw"; Transliteration: "Nihontō tai Chensō" (Japanese: 日本刀VS(たい)チェンソー)	Ryū Nakayama	Kazutaka Sugiyama, Yosuke Yajima, Riki; Matsuura, Hiroyuki Saita, Sōta Yamazaki, Takako Shimizu & Shun	"Fight Song" by Eve	December 28, 2022
Aki defeats the Ghost Devil by letting go of his fear when remembering Himeno, allowing him to approach it without it fighting back, and cuts off its head. Akane attempts to kill Aki with the Snake Devil, but Kobeni appears and holds Akane at knife-point. Aki asks Kobeni why she chose to stay with Public Safety, and she responds that bonuses are coming soon. Denji fights Samurai Sword on a train and defeats him using a chainsaw blade grown in his leg after Samurai Sword severs his arms. Before handing Samurai Sword over to the police, Aki and Denji have a testicular-kicking tournament to see who can make Samurai Sword scream the loudest. The Snake Devil kills Akane in an act of involuntary suicide before she can reveal more information about the Gun Devil, while Makima reveals the Gun Devil flesh they obtained in the mission, combined with what they had before, which will allow them to pinpoint the Gun Devil's location. Denji dreams of seeing a door in an alley, but Pochita's voice tells him not to open it. Meanwhile, a woman's voice questions Denji if he would rather be a country mouse or a city mouse.

== Home media release ==
=== Japanese ===
MAPPA (Japan – Region 2/A)
Vol.	Episodes	Cover character(s)	Release date	Ref.
1	1–3	Denji	January 27, 2023	
2	4–6	Power	February 24, 2023	
3	7–9	Aki Hayakawa	March 31, 2023	
4	10–12	Denji and Makima	April 28, 2023	

=== English ===
Crunchyroll, LLC (North America – Region 1/A)
Season	Episodes	Release date	Ref.
1	1–12	July 29, 2025	
