= Gunfire (disambiguation) =

Gunfire is the discharge of a firearm, or the sound made by this discharge.

Gunfire may also refer to:

== Film and television ==
- Gunfire, a 1934 Western starring Rex Bell
- Gunfire (film), a 1950 American film directed by William Berke
- The Gunfire, the English translation of the Chinese title for the 1999 film The Mission
- Gunfire (Chainsaw Man), an episode of the anime television series Chainsaw Man

== Other ==
- Gunfire (drink), a cocktail made of tea and rum
- Gunfire (character), a DC comic book superhero
