= MTV Video Music Award Japan for Best Collaboration =

Annual Japanese music award

- Awarded for: Collaborative music videos
- Country: Japan
- Presented by: MTV Japan
- First award: 2003

Highlights
- Most awards: Jay-Z, Millennium Parade, and Lilas Ikuta (2)
- Most nominations: Jay-Z (4)
- Website: Official website

The MTV Video Music Award Japan for Best Collaboration (最優秀コラボレーションビデオ賞) is an annual award given by MTV Japan since 2003.

== Results ==
The following table displays the nominees and the winners in bold print with a yellow background.

=== 2000s ===
Year	Artist	Video	Ref.
**2003** (2nd)	**Suite Chic featuring Firstklas**	**"Good Life"**	
**2003** (2nd)	Eve featuring Alicia Keys	"Gangsta Lovin'"	
**2003** (2nd)	Crystal Kay featuring Sphere of Influence and Sora	"Hard to Say"	
**2003** (2nd)	Nelly featuring Kelly Rowland	"Dilemma"	
**2003** (2nd)	Rhymester featuring Crazy Ken Band	"Nikutai Kankei part 2" (肉体関係 part2 逆)	
**2004** (3rd)	**Beyoncé featuring Jay-Z**	**"Crazy in Love"**	
**2004** (3rd)	Ken Hirai and Kyu Sakamoto	"Miagete Goran Yoru no Hoshi o" (見上げてごらん夜の星を)	
**2004** (3rd)	M-Flo loves Who? featuring Crystal Kay	"Reeewind! / I Like it"	
**2004** (3rd)	Britney Spears featuring Madonna	"Me Against the Music"	
**2004** (3rd)	Voice of Love Posse	"Voice of Love"	
**2005** (4th)	**Jay-Z and Linkin Park**	**"Numb/Encore"**	
**2005** (4th)	AI featuring Afra + Tucker	"Watch Out!"	
**2005** (4th)	Kiyoshiro Imawano featuring Rhymester	"Ame Agarino Yozora Ni 35" (雨あがりの夜空に 35)	
**2005** (4th)	Snoop Dogg featuring Pharrell	"Drop It Like It's Hot"	
**2005** (4th)	Usher and Alicia Keys	"My Boo"	
**2006** (5th)	**Tomoyasu Hotei and Rip Slyme**	**"Battle Funkatic"**	
**2006** (5th)	Bow Wow featuring Omarion	"Let Me Hold You"	
**2006** (5th)	Missy Elliott featuring Ciara and Fat Man Scoop	"Lose Control"	
**2006** (5th)	Glay x Exile	"Scream"	
**2006** (5th)	Crystal Kay x Chemistry	"Two As One"	
**2007** (6th)	**U2 and Green Day**	**"The Saints Are Coming"**	
**2007** (6th)	Akon featuring Eminem	"Smack That"	
**2007** (6th)	Sérgio Mendes featuring The Black Eyed Peas	"Mas Que Nada"	
**2007** (6th)	Quruli featuring Rip Slyme	"Juice"	
**2007** (6th)	Ringo Shiina + Saito Neko + Shiina Junpei	"Kono Yo no Kagiri" (この世の限り)	
**2008** (7th)	**Kumi Koda featuring Tohoshinki**	**"Last Angel"**	
**2008** (7th)	Beyoncé and Shakira	"Beautiful Liar"	
**2008** (7th)	Yuna Ito x Celine Dion	"A World to Believe In"	
**2008** (7th)	Toshinobu Kubota meets Kreva	"M☆A☆G☆I☆C"	
**2008** (7th)	Timbaland featuring The Hives	"Throw It On Me"	
**2009** (8th)	**Nelly and Fergie**	**"Party People"**	
**2009** (8th)	Madonna featuring Justin Timberlake and Timbaland	"4 Minutes"	
**2009** (8th)	Scha Dara Parr + Kaela Kimura	"Hey! Hey! Alright"	
**2009** (8th)	T.I. featuring Rihanna	"Live Your Life"	
**2009** (8th)	Anna Tsuchiya featuring AI	"Crazy World"	

=== 2010s ===
Year	Artist	Video	Ref.
**2010** (9th)	**W-inds. featuring G-Dragon**	**"Rain Is Fallin'"**	
**2010** (9th)	Beyoncé featuring Lady Gaga	"Video Phone"	
**2010** (9th)	Jay-Z featuring Alicia Keys	"Empire State of Mind"	
**2010** (9th)	Juju with Jay'ed	"Ashita ga Kuru Nara" (明日がくるなら)	
**2010** (9th)	Miliyah Kato featuring Shota Shimizu	"Love Forever"	
**2011** (10th)	**Eminem featuring Rihanna**	**"Love the Way You Lie"**	
**2011** (10th)	Ai featuring Namie Amuro	"Fake"	
**2011** (10th)	Brahman / Ego-Wrappin'	"We Are Here"	
**2011** (10th)	Katy Perry featuring Snoop Dogg	"California Gurls"	
**2011** (10th)	Nicki Minaj featuring will.i.am	"Check It Out"	
**2012** (11th)	**Namie Amuro featuring After School**	"**Make It Happen"**	
**2012** (11th)	Jay-Z and Kanye West featuring Otis Redding	"Otis"	
**2012** (11th)	Miliyah Kato x Shota Shimizu	"Believe"	
**2012** (11th)	Maroon 5 featuring Christina Aguilera	"Moves like Jagger"	
**2012** (11th)	Special Others and Kj	"Sailin'"	
**2013** (12th)	**Miyavi vs Yuksek**	**"Day 1"**	
**2013** (12th)	Back Drop Bomb featuring Aklo	"The Beginning and The End"	
**2013** (12th)	Calvin Harris featuring Florence Welch	"Sweet Nothing"	
**2013** (12th)	Maroon 5 featuring Wiz Khalifa	"Payphone"	
**2013** (12th)	Keiichiro Shibuya + Hiroki Azuma featuring Hatsune Miku	"Initiation" (イニシエーション)	
**2014** (13th)	**T.M.Revolution and Nana Mizuki**	**"Preserved Roses"**	
**2014** (13th)	Jennifer Lopez featuring Pitbull	"Live It Up"	
**2014** (13th)	Man with a Mission featuring Takuma	"Database"	
**2014** (13th)	Robin Thicke featuring T.I. and Pharrell Williams	"Blurred Lines"	
**2014** (13th)	Soil & "Pimp" Sessions and Ringo Sheena	"Koroshiya Kiki Ippatsu"	
**2015** (14th)	**Momoiro Clover Z vs Kiss**	**"Yume no Ukiyo ni Saitemina"**	
**2015** (14th)	Basement Jaxx (featuring Team Syachihoko)	"Back 2 the Wild (Japanese ver.)"	
**2015** (14th)	Flower featuring Little Mix	"Dreamin' Together"	
**2015** (14th)	Man with a Mission featuring Zebrahead	"Out of Control"	
**2015** (14th)	Owl City featuring Sekai no Owari	"Tokyo"	
**2017** (16th)	**Hikaru Utada featuring KOHH**	**"Bōkyaku" (忘却)**	
**2019** (18th)	**Ringo Sheena and Hiroji Miyamoto**	**"Kemono yuku Hosomichi" (獣ゆく細道)**	

=== 2020s ===
Year	Category	Artist	Video	Ref.
**2020** (19th)	—N/a	**LiSA featuring Pablo**	"Play the world!"	
**2021** (20th)	Japan	**Millennium Parade and Belle**	"U"	
**2021** (20th)	International	**Coldplay and BTS**	"My Universe"	
**2022** (21st)	Japan	**Tokyo Ska Paradise Orchestra featuring Lilas Ikuta**	"Free Free Free"	
**2023** (22nd)	Japan	**Millennium Parade and Ringo Sheena**	"Work"	
**2023** (22nd)	International	**Sam Smith and Kim Petras**	"Unholy"	
**2025** (23rd)	Japan	**Ano featuring Lilas Ikuta**	"Zezezezettai Seiiki" (絶絶絶絶対聖域)	
**2025** (23rd)	International	**Rosé and Bruno Mars**	"APT."	
**2026** (24th)	Japan	**Kenshi Yonezu** **and** **Hikaru Utada**	"Jane Doe"	
**2026** (24th)	International	**Madonna** **and** **Sabrina Carpenter**	"Bring Your Love"	
