= You'll Melt More! =

Japanese idol girl group

- Origin: Japan
- Genres: J-pop
- Years active: 2012–present
- Members: Nerun; Nani; Meari; Heso; Matsuri
- Past members: Itchy; Nonchan; Yuizarasu; Yumikon; Mone; Chibo; Ano; Younapi; Kechon; Chiffon
- Website: youllmeltmore.fanpla.jp

You'll Melt More! (ゆるめるモ!) is a Japanese alternative idol girl group formed in 2012. They released their first studio album, Unforgettable Final Odyssey, on July 9, 2014.

== Members ==
Name	Member Color	Notes
Current Members
Nerun (ねるん)	Pink	Joined February 2020, former member of trainee group Pupil Mo!
Nani (なに)	Green	Joined February 2020, former member of trainee group Pupil Mo!
Meari (めあり)	Blue	Joined April 2021, former member of trainee group Pupil Mo!
Heso (へそ)	Orange	Joined April 2021, former member of trainee group Pupil Mo!
Matsuri (まつり)	Yellow	Joined April 2021, former member of trainee group Pupil Mo!
Former Members
Itchy (いっちー)	Blue	Original Member, Left February 2013
Nonchan (のんちゃん)	Red	Original Member, Left September 2013
Yuizarasu (ゆいざらす)	Yellow	Joined September 2013, Left August 2014
Yumikon (ゆみこーん)	Green	Original Member, Left December 2014
Mone (もね)	Pink	Joined January 2013, Left July 2016, formerly used the name Momopi
Chibo (ちーぼう)	Orange	Joined September 2013, Left July 2016
Ano (あの)	Blue	Joined September 2013, Left September 2019
Younapi (ようなぴ)	White	Joined September 2013, Left October 2020
Kechon (けちょん)	Purple	Original Member, Left October 2021
Chiffon (しふぉん)	Red	Joined September 2013, Left October 2021

== Discography ==
=== Studio albums ===
Title	Album details	Peak chart positions	
Title	Album details	JPN	
Title	Album details	Oricon	Hot
Unforgettable Final Odyssey	Released: July 9, 2014; Label: Space Shower Music; Formats: CD, digital download	82	—
You are the World	Released: November 11, 2015; Label: You'll Records; Formats: CD, digital download	51	85
Youtopia	Released: November 29, 2017; Label: You'll Records; Formats: CD, digital download	60	—
Surpriser (サプライザー)	Released: February 26, 2020; Label: You'll Records; Formats: CD, digital download	86	—

=== Compilation albums ===
Title	Album details	Peak chart positions	
Title	Album details	JPN	
Title	Album details	Oricon	Hot
Ongaku yo Maware!! Music Go Round ~Yuru Best!~ (音楽よ回れ!! Music Go Round ～ゆるベスト!～)	Released: May 9, 2018; Label: You'll Records; Formats: CD, digital download	63	—

=== Extended plays ===
Title	Album details	Peak chart positions	
Title	Album details	JPN	
Title	Album details	Oricon	Hot
New Escape Underground!	Released: September 18, 2013; Label: You'll Records; Formats: CD, digital download	—	—
Electric Sukiyaki Girls	Released: May 21, 2014; Label: You'll Records; Formats: CD, digital download	89	—
Suimin City Destroyer	Released: December 31, 2014; Label: You'll Records; Formats: CD, digital download	100	—
Onnanoko yo Shitai to Odore (女の子よ死体と踊れ)	Released: October 21, 2015; Label: King Records; Formats: CD, digital download	161	—
We are a Rock Festival	Released: July 13, 2016; Label: You'll Records; Formats: CD, digital download	65	—
Disco Psychedelica (ディスコサイケデリカ)	Released: June 28, 2017; Label: You'll Records; Formats: CD, digital download	99	—
Shaker Peacemaker	Released: August 7, 2019; Label: You'll Records; Formats: CD, digital download	87	—

=== Singles ===
Title	Year	Peak chart positions	Album
Title	Year	Oricon	Album
"Hamidasumo!"	2015	33	You are the World
"Bungaku to Hakai EP" (文学と破壊 EP)	2015	85	You are the World
"Kodoku to Gyakushuu EP" (孤独と逆襲EP)	2017	61	Disco Psychedelica
"Talking Hits EP"	2017	80	Youtopia
"Hippy Mondays EP"	2018	85	Surpriser
"Never Give Up Drunk Monkeys EP"	2018	56	Surpriser
