= Kanaria (musician) =

Japanese musician

- Born: 30 May 2002 (age 24)
- Occupation: Musician
- Instruments: Vocaloid, vocals
- Years active: 2020–present

YouTube information
- Channel: Kanaria
- Years active: 2020–present
- Genre: Music
- Subscribers: 1.48 million
- Views: 596,916,803
- Last updated: 14 April 2026

Kanaria (Japanese: カナリア; born 30 May 2002) is a Japanese musician and VTuber. After making his debut with the song "Hyakkisai" (2020), he rose to popularity with his next song "King", released three months later. He has also released two albums, King (2020) and Kanaria.code (2022).

== Biography ==
Kanaria was born on 30 May 2002. On 10 May 2020, twenty days before his eighteenth birthday, he made his career debut with his Hatsune Miku song "Hyakkisai", which Eimika Katsuya characterizes as having "a rhythmic wa melody like a Bon Odori dance" and lyrics as "mysterious, code-like [and a] Japanese-style song that will send shivers down your spine".

Kanaria rose to popularity with his next song "King", released on 10 August 2020. On 9 December 2020, his album King was released. On 7 May 2021, Kanaria appeared on Music Station as "the next big thing". He also wrote, composed, and arranged the song "Domestic De Violence" on Ado's 2022 debut album Kyōgen.

In September 2022, Kanaria released a greatest hits album named "Kanaria.code". In November 2022, he released "Dainōteki-na Rendezvous", the ending theme for the Chainsaw Man episode "Kill Denji"; it was the first time he sang himself instead of using a Vocaloid bank. In February 2023, his song "Yoidore Shirazu" topped Billboard Japan's Top User Generated Songs chart.

In April 2023, Kanaria released "Requiem", a collaboration song with Hololive VTuber Hoshimachi Suisei. In July 2024, he was the songwriter for "Champion", the last song for Pokémon and Hatsune Miku's Project Voltage collaboration.

On 24 August 2024, Kanaria debuted as a VTuber, saying that there were several cases of people impersonating him, with at least one case of catfishing on the game Apex Legends. He confirmed on his debut stream that he is male.

== Discography ==
=== Albums ===
Title	Year	Details	Peak chart positions		Sales	Ref.
Title	Year	Details	JPN	JPN Comb.	Sales	Ref.
King	2020	Released: 9 December 2020; Label: Self-released	44	—	—	
Kanaria.code	2022	Released: 21 September 2022; Label: Self-released	18	26	—	

=== Singles ===
Title	Year	Details	Peak chart positions		Sales	Ref.
Title	Year	Details	JPN Dig.	JPN Str.	Sales	Ref.
"Yoidore Shirazu" (酔いどれ知らず)	2022	Released: 2 May 2022	—	48	—	
"Dainōteki-na Rendezvous" (大脳的なランデブー)	2022	Released: 16 November 2022	33	—	—	
