= Bone Born Bomb =

Studio album by Ano
- Released: June 4, 2025
- Length: 40:19
- Language: Japanese
- Label: Toy's Factory

Ano chronology
Nyang Nyang Oeeee (2023)	Bone Born Bomb (2025)

Bone Born Bomb is the second studio album by Japanese singer Ano. It was released on June 4, 2025, through Toy's Factory.

== Background and promotion ==
Ano announced Bone Born Bomb in March 2025. In April 2025, a promotional video for the album was released on YouTube. On June 4, 2025, the album was officially released. The songs on the album were used for television series and movies.

== Reception ==
Bone Born Bomb debuted at number 6 on the Oricon Albums Chart, selling 5,225 copies in its first week. The album also reached number 12 on the Oricon Combined Albums Chart at the same time.

== Tour ==
On June 19, Ano held an album release tour titled "Bone Born Bomb Tour". The performance was cenetered on the album. The setlist featured 20 songs, 12 of which were from the just-releasing album.

== Tracklisting ==
No.	Title	Length
1.	"Zezezezettai Seiiki" (featuring Rira Ikuta; 絶絶絶絶対聖域)	3:33
2.	"Bubble Me Face"	3:32
3.	"Bone Baki Twilight Diary" (骨バキ☆ゆうぐれダイアリー)	2:43
4.	"LoliRockyunRobo" (ロりロっきゅんロぼ♡)	3:38
5.	"Inazukkyun" (許婚っきゅん)	2:57
6.	"Aishiteru Nantene" (愛してる、なんてね。)	3:37
7.	"Just The Two Of Us In This World" (この世界に二人だけ)	3:43
8.	"Swim In Sleeping Tokyo" (Swim in 睡眠Tokyo)	3:08
9.	"Shakai No Mado" (社会の窓)	2:47
10.	"Happy Lucky Chappy" (ハッピーラッキーチャッピー)	3:04
11.	"You&I Heaven" (YOU&愛Heaven)	3:46
12.	"Past Die Future"	3:46
Total length:		40:19

== Charts ==
Weekly chart performance for Bone Born Bomb
Chart (2025)	Peak position
Oricon Albums Chart	6
Oricon Combined Albums Chart	12
