= John (musician) =

Japanese musician

- Also known as: Tooboe
- Born: Japan
- Genre: J-pop
- Occupations: Vocaloid producer; Singer-songwriter
- Years active: 2019–present
- Label: Mastersix Foundation (2022–present)

John (Japanese: ジョン, stylized in lowercase) is a Japanese Vocaloid producer and singer-songwriter. As a solo project, he performs under the name Tooboe (Japanese: トオボエ, stylized in all caps). He is a self-produced multi-creator, handling lyrics, composition, arrangement, singing, illustration, and video production for his own music.

== Career ==
From a young age, John was exposed to guitar and piano and began composing as a hobby using DTM. Around 2018, he discovered artists such as balloon and NayutalieN, which sparked his interest in Vocaloid music.

In April 2019, he uploaded his first Vocaloid song, "Inferiority", to Niconico and YouTube, beginning his career as a Vocaloid producer. His Vocaloid work makes exclusive use of Hatsune Miku. Since then, his Vocaloid output has included works such as "Shunran", "Itaino Itaino Tondeike", "Jōzai", and "Shinzō"; "Shunran" has surpassed 45 million views on YouTube.

In September 2020, John launched his solo project under the name Tooboe and began producing both his own vocal works and songs for other artists while continuing his Vocaloid activities. An early notable songwriting credit under this project was "Masshiro", a song written for singer yama in 2020, which served as the theme for the ABEMA romance programme Koi Suru Drama ga Mitai: Kiss On The Bed.

In April 2022, he made his major debut under Mastersix Foundation with his first single, "Shinzō".

In 2022, Tooboe composed, arranged, and performed "Jōzai" (錠剤; lit. Tablet) as the fourth episode ending theme for the anime Chainsaw Man, which featured a different ending song for each of its twelve episodes. In 2025, Tooboe composed, arranged, and performed "Anata wa Kaibutsu" (あなたはかいぶつ; English: You Are My Monster) as the ending theme for the anime The Summer Hikaru Died (光が死んだ夏). The song was first revealed publicly at AnimeJapan 2025 as part of the main trailer. In a statement accompanying the announcement, Tooboe described delving into the story's themes of memory and the discovery that someone close is not who one believed them to be, and characterised the resulting song as a form of forgiveness extended to the characters.

== Artistry and influences ==
In his Vocaloid work, John exclusively uses Hatsune Miku and has created many of his own music videos. A notable characteristic of his Vocaloid tuning is the pronunciation of the kana starting with /t/ as [ts], producing sounds rendered as "tsa, tsi, tsu, tse, tso."

His primary stated sources of inspiration for lyrics are "anger" and a desire to give courage to others. His musical influences include Hideo Okuda for lyricism and Shikao Suga for composition; a formative experience was seeing Suga's "Gogo no Parade" performed on television, which led him to explore solo singer-songwriters including Masayoshi Yamazaki and Kazuyoshi Saito. As a child, he aspired to become a manga artist.

== Discography ==
=== As John ===
- Angry Dog (August 24, 2019)
- Rose (December 22, 2019)
- Miserable (August 21, 2020)
- Pink Moon (June 16, 2023)

=== As Tooboe ===
==== Studio albums ====
- Senshuraku (2021)
- Stupid Dog (2024)
- Evergreen (2026)

==== EPs ====
- Jōzai (2022)
- You Are My Monster (2025)

==== Singles ====
===== As lead artist =====
- "Akai Yoru" (2020)
- "Doku" (2020)
- "Yūutsu" (2021)
- "Kūfuku" (with Maeshima Sōshi) (2021)
- "Mononoke / Shikai" (2021)
- "Mahi" (2021)
- "Hen" (2021)
- "Alien / Blue Monday" (2021)
- "Murasaki" (2021)
- "Shinzō" (2022)
- "Oxygen" (2022)
- "Haiboku" (2022)
- "Ivory" (2022)
- "Jōzai" (2022)
- "Chili Sauce" (2022)
- "Ōjōgiwa no imi o shire" (2023)
- "Roman" (2023)
- "Appare Kanpai" (2023)
- "Fish" (2023)
- "Hakuai" (2023)
- "Hōkō" (2024)
- "Hikari" (2024)
- "Itaino itaino tondeike" (2024)
- "Kire egoto" (2024)
- "Collage" (with Puffy) (2024)
- "Wonderful World" (2024)
- "First Love" (2025)
- "Anata wa kaibutsu" (2025)
- "GUN POWDER" (2026)
- "BAP" (2026)
- "Juggernaut" (2026)

===== As featured artist =====
- "Re Juu No Buhin" (People 1 feat. Tooboe) (2022)
- "Sepia" (Mori Calliope feat. Tooboe) (2025)
