= 2017 MTV Video Music Awards Japan =

Annual Japanese music awards ceremony

- Date: September 27, 2017
- Location: Tokyo
- Hosted by: Ken Ayuga & JOANN

Television/radio coverage
- Network: MTV Japan

The 2017 MTV Video Music Awards Japan was held in Tokyo on September 27, 2017.

== Main awards ==
=== Best Video of the Year ===
Gen Hoshino — "Family song"

=== Best Male Video ===
Japan Gen Hoshino — "Family song"

=== Best Female Video ===
Japan Kana Nishino — "Package"

=== Best Group Video ===
Japan Momoiro Clover Z — "Blast!"

=== Best New Artist Video ===
Japan THE RAMPAGE from EXILE TRIBE — "Lightning"

=== Best Rock Video ===
WANIMA — CHARM"

=== Best Alternative Video ===
Rekishi - KATOKU

=== Best Metal Video ===
METALLICA — "Hardwired"

=== Best Pop Video ===
ED SHEERAN — "Shape of You"

=== Best R&B Video ===
Daichi Miura — "(RE)PLAY"

=== Best Hip Hop Video ===
KICK THE CAN CREW — "thousand%"

=== Best Dance Video ===
MONDO GROSSO — "labyrinth"

=== Best Choreography ===
Gen Hoshino — "Koi (song)"

=== Best Collaboration Video ===
Hikaru Utada - Forget ft. KOHH

== Special awards ==
=== Inspiration Award Japan ===
Buck-Tick

=== Best Buzz Award ===
Keyakizaka46
