= List of Chainsaw Man characters =

Cast of manga series by Tatsuki Fujimoto

Some of the characters featured in the first part of the series, including (front to back, left row): Reze, Pochita, Denji, Kobeni Higashiyama, Hirofumi Yoshida, (front to back, right row) Power, Makima, Angel Devil, Aki Hayakawa (left), and Himeno (right)

The Japanese manga series Chainsaw Man features an extensive cast of characters created by Tatsuki Fujimoto.

== Main characters ==
Denji (デンジ) / Chainsaw Man (チェンソーマン, Chensō Man)

Voiced by: Kikunosuke Toya, Marina Inoue (child) (Japanese); Ryan Colt Levy, Ciarán Strange (child) (English)
Portrayed by: Naotake Tsuchiya (stage play, Denji), Masahide Tada and Yutaka Nakasone (stage play, Chainsaw Man)
A blond, sharp-toothed student at Fourth East High School, Denji inherited his father's debt to the yakuza. After bonding with the Chainsaw Devil, Pochita, he becomes a Devil Hunter to repay it. When the yakuza send the Zombie Devil to kill him, Pochita fuses with his corpse, reviving him as a hybrid with the ability to transform into Chainsaw Man. Initially joining Public Safety Devil Hunting under Makima's influence, his motivations shift from romantic obsession to seeking fame and women, while caring for his adoptive family.
Asa Mitaka (三鷹アサ, Mitaka Asa)
A socially isolated high school student at Fourth East High, Asa Mitaka is consumed by guilt over past deaths and harbors deep resentment toward devils after the Typhoon Devil killed her mother. After being murdered by the class president (a Justice Devil contractor), she is revived by Yoru, the War Devil, becoming her vessel and gaining hybrid abilities. Forced to aid Yoru's quest to kill Chainsaw Man and reclaim the Nuclear Weapons Devil, she unknowingly grows close to Denji—unaware of his true identity. Prone to self-sabotage in relationships due to loneliness and fear of abandonment, she misinterprets Nayuta's interference as rejection, reinforcing her cynical worldview."

== Devils and Fiends ==
Pochita (ポチタ) / Chainsaw Devil (チェンソーの悪魔, Chensō no Akuma)
Voiced by: Shiori Izawa (Japanese); Lindsay Seidel (English)
The Chainsaw Devil, who merges with Denji and was the original Chainsaw Man prior to meeting him. He has the ability to eat a devil and erase their existence, making him "the Devil that Devils fear most". He first appears in his dog form, sporting an orange hue and large eyes, with a chainsaw-like appendage protruding from his face, which is actually his weakened state following a fight with unknown opponents. His true devil form is a darker version of Denji's hybrid form with four arms and one of his intestines wrapped around his neck, which resembles a scarf.
Gun Devil (銃の悪魔, Jū no Akuma)
One of the most powerful and feared Devils in the world. Thirteen years before the series' events, it manifested after a terrorist attack and attacked the world, killing 1.2 million people before disappearing. After an unknown entity defeated it, it was scattered into pieces, which the governments of several countries have gathered to form contracts with it. The president of the United States summons 20% of the Gun Devil to kill Makima, and while she is able to defeat it, it possesses Aki's body, turning into the Gun Fiend. Denji later kills it, though the other 80% of it survives. The other 28% kept by the Soviets would later be summoned by Yoru, which turns into a right arm gauntlet in order to battle Pochita.
Zombie Devil (ゾンビの悪魔, Zonbi no Akuma)
Voiced by: Kōki Miyata (Japanese); Linda Young (English)
A devil embodying the fear of zombies who formed a contract with the yakuza to have Denji killed. After Denji is revived, he cuts the Zombie Devil in half, effectively killing it. However, its zombie creations continue to exist, which Samurai Sword and Akane use to attack the Public Safety Division. Makima later summons the Zombie Devil to turn Devil Hunters into zombies.
Bat Devil (コウモリの悪魔, Kōmori no Akuma)
Voiced by: Kenichirou Matsuda (Japanese); Gabe Kunda (English)
A devil embodying the fear of bats. He takes Power's pet cat Meowy hostage in exchange for her bringing him humans to eat, but Denji later kills him. His next incarnation appears in a more wild state when pursuing Asa and Yuko, with Denji killing him again while fighting the Cockroach Devil.
Fox Devil (狐の悪魔, Kitsune no Akuma)
Voiced by: Yūko Kaida (Japanese); Natalie Van Sistine (English)
A devil embodying the fear of foxes. The Fox Devil is friendly with humans, allowing numerous Devil Hunters to make contracts with it to summon parts of her body. However, it only grants attractive people the ability to summon its head, showing a rather superficial side.
Eternity Devil (永遠の悪魔, Eien no Akuma)
A devil embodying the fear of eternity. He takes over Morin Hotel, trapping anyone who tries to enter in an endless eighth floor. Tokyo Special Division 4 is sent to retrieve a piece of the Gun Devil, which he had taken. After Denji attacks and mortally wounds him, he kills him after he offers up his core to him. His next incarnation takes over Tanashi Aquarium, trapping Denji during his date with Asa as part of the Death Devil's scheme to turn Denji into a weapon, but fails when Asa turns the aquarium into a spear and Yoru uses it to kill him.
Curse Devil (呪いの悪魔, Noroi no Akuma)
Voiced by: Yūko Ueda
A devil embodying the fear of curses. A person contracting the Curse Devil, upon stabbing their victim with a sword three times, can manifest the Curse Devil, which will mortally crush its victim. However, using its abilities comes at the cost of several years of the contractor's lifespan. It had previously contracted with Aki and Santa Claus.
Ghost Devil (幽霊の悪魔, Yūrei no Akuma)
Voiced by: Hiroko Kiso
A devil embodying the fear of ghosts. It had a contract with Himeno, allowing her to grab objects with invisible arms, and manifests to fight Samurai Sword after Himeno offers her body as payment, but Aki kills it.
Future Devil (未来の悪魔, Mirai no Akuma)
Voiced by: Hiroki (Japanese); Landon McDonald (English)
A devil embodying the fear of the future who can see the future of those he comes into contact with. He makes a contract with Aki after the Tokyo Public Safety Division captures him and later reappears to gloat to Denji, having seen beforehand that he would kill Aki. Sometime later, he is recaptured to investigate the Nostradamus Prophecy by predicting the fate of the thirty convicts.
Typhoon Devil (台風の悪魔, Taifū no Akuma)
Voiced by: Eri Kitamura (Japanese); Reshel Mae (English)
A devil embodying the fear of typhoons. Its first incarnation killed Asa's parents and destroyed her home. The second incarnation appears to battle Denji with Reze, but he kills it with Beam's help.
Hell Devil (地獄の悪魔, Jigoku no Akuma)
A devil embodying the fear of Hell. It can grab people with a giant six-fingered hand that emerges from the sky to carry them into Hell.
Bucky (コケピー, Kokepī) / Chicken Devil (鶏の悪魔, Niwatori no Akuma)
A devil embodying the fear of chickens. An extremely weak devil, he was Asa's class pet devil, who the class bonded with as they learned to value life. He died after Asa tripped and fell on him while trying to carry him to join in at recess.
Justice Devil (正義の悪魔, Seigi no Akuma)
A devil embodying the fear of justice. A number of students, including Yuko, make contracts with an entity they believe is the Justice Devil. These contracts enable them to turn their innate sense of justice into power.
Fire Devil (火の悪魔, Hi no Akuma)
A Devil embodying the fear of fire, who assumes the alias of "Justice Devil" to make contracts with members of Fourth East High School and the Chainsaw Man Church. It can turn contractors into Devils in the likeness of Chainsaw Man.
Locust Devil (バッタの悪魔, Batta no Akuma)
A Devil embodying the fear of locusts, who attacked Denji and Yoru after the former brought the two to Hell.

=== Allies of the Public Safety Organization ===
Power (パワー, Pawā)

Voiced by: Fairouz Ai (Japanese); Sarah Wiedenheft (English)
Portrayed by: Mahiru Coda (stage play)
A Blood Fiend serving as a Public Safety Devil Hunter under Makima. Distinguished by her red horns, Power exhibits violent tendencies but forms genuine attachments to her cat Meowy (ニャーコ, Nyāko) and teammates Denji and Aki. After Makima executes her to psychologically break Denji, she is temporarily revived as the Blood Devil to save him. In her final moments, Power contracts with Denji—offering her blood in exchange for his promise to find and befriend her future reincarnation.
Angel Devil (天使の悪魔, Tenshi no Akuma)
Voiced by: Maaya Uchida (Japanese); Casey Mongillo (English)
A humanoid embodiment of angelic fear, appears as an androgynous youth capable of draining lifespans through touch. Despite his dangerous ability, he harbors no ill will toward humans and maintains isolation to protect them. Formerly living peacefully in a village, Makima manipulated him into destroying it to test his powers. As a Public Safety Devil Hunter, he partners with Aki after Himeno's death, becoming the division's second-strongest agent. Their bond strengthens when Aki willingly touches him to save his life. After losing both arms against the Darkness Devil and recovering his memories, he attempts to oppose Makima but falls under her control, becoming her weapon to hunt Pochita.
Beam (ビーム, Bīmu)
Voiced by: Natsuki Hanae (Japanese); Derick Snow (English)
The Shark Fiend, who has the ability to "swim" through solid objects and transform into a more monstrous shark-like form. He is partnered with Denji, whom he worships, and sacrifices himself to revive him during the battle with the Darkness Devil in Hell.
Galgali (ガルガリ, Garugari)
Voiced by: Yūya Uchida (Japanese); Josh Bangle (English)
The Violence Fiend, who ironically is friendly and polite and loves peace. He wears a plague doctor-like mask that dispenses poisonous gas to keep his immense strength under control. Unlike most Fiends, he retains most of his human brain and remembers several details of his past life. He befriends Kobeni, but is killed during the battle with the Darkness Devil.
Princi (プリンシ, Purinshi)
Voiced by: Saori Gotō (Japanese); Julie Shields (English)
The Spider Devil and the embodiment of the fear of spiders, who takes the form of a half-human, half-spider woman. She mostly takes orders from Makima.

=== Four Horsemen ===
A group of powerful devils based on the Four Horsemen of the Apocalypse who can remember the existence of devils eaten by the Chainsaw Devil, who they battled long ago. They seek to kill or use the Chainsaw Man to fulfill their goals. According to the Death Devil, the horsemen may be related to each other, as she treats Yoru like a younger sibling. The horsemen take forms of young women/girls on their human forms.

Control Devil (支配の悪魔, Shihai no Akuma)
A powerful devil that represents the fear of domination, conquest and control, and one of the Four Horsemen. They can control devils and humans, including their contracts and abilities.

Makima (マキマ)

Voiced by: Tomori Kusunoki (Japanese); Suzie Yeung (English)
Portrayed by: Aya Hirano (stage play)
The enigmatic head of Public Safety Division 4, Makima initially appears compassionate but manipulates Denji through affection to ensure his loyalty, threatening to treat him as a Devil if he disobeys. Later revealed as the Control Devil, she seeks to reshape the world using Chainsaw Man's power, though her deeper desire is to form genuine familial bonds—a need suppressed by her upbringing as a government weapon. After Denji defeats the Gun Devil, she grants his wish but severs his contract upon realizing his submissive devotion conflicts with her ideals. She escalates her plans by killing Power and psychologically breaking Denji, only to recognize her error when fighting Pochita (disguised as Denji). Denji ultimately kills her, bypassing her contract with the prime minister by cutting her with a chainsaw made from Power's blood; he then eats her body as an act of love, declaring that he will always love her despite her actions.
Nayuta (ナユタ)
The reincarnated Control Devil following Makima's death, Nayuta is a young girl with the distinctive ringed eyes of the Horsemen. Kishibe retrieves her from China and entrusts her to Denji's care to prevent government exploitation. As a Devil, she matures faster than humans, showing significant physical and intellectual growth within months. While sharing Makima's protective nature toward Denji, she displays more childish tendencies, using her powers for petty acts like brainwashing Asa into behaving like a dog. Unlike her predecessor, Nayuta openly expresses possessiveness over Denji, manipulating his relationships and decisions, yet maintains a genuine familial bond with him. Nayuta's name and initial appearance are seemingly based on the titular character of Fujimoto's previous work Yogen no Nayuta (予言のナユタ).

Yoru (ヨル) / War Devil (戦争の悪魔, Sensō no Akuma)
The weakened War Devil and one of the Four Horsemen, Yoru inhabits half of Asa Mitaka's brain after resurrecting her body. Capable of transforming objects into weapons (the strength and fragility of which depends on guilt), she seeks revenge against Chainsaw Man for her near-destruction. Unlike the detached Makima, Yoru displays more human vulnerability, possibly influenced by Asa's personality. Initially appearing in an owl-like form, she later adopts the name "Yoru" ('night') to complement Asa ('day'). Though developing romantic feelings for Denji through Asa, she maintains her lethal intentions—eventually striking a deal where she will kill the Death Devil in exchange for a relationship with him, while threatening to weaponize him if he refuses.
Li'l D (死ーちゃん, Shī-chan) / Death Devil (死の悪魔, Shi no Akuma)
A mysterious entity initially presenting herself as the Famine Devil (Fami), she is later revealed to be the Death Devil—the eldest and most powerful of the Four Horsemen. While posing as a student at Fourth East High School and leading the Chainsaw Man Church, she claims to want to prevent the Nostradamus prophecy to preserve her ability to enjoy human culture. She demonstrates the power to enslave those she kills, even affecting Primal Fear Devils by transforming them into miniature effigies. Referred to as "The King of Terror", she represents humanity's peak fear of death and possesses seemingly complete immortality, having survived organ removal. She wears earrings resembling scales and has an abnormally large appetite. Unlike other Horsemen, she shows little concern about hiding her true nature despite Public Safety's surveillance.
Fami (キガ, Kiga) / Famine (or Hunger) Devil (飢餓の悪魔, Kiga no Akuma)
The Famine Devil (Fami), one of the Four Horsemen representing the fear of famine and hunger. She possesses the ability to absorb nutrition from living beings to sustain her power and immortality. Initially mistaken for the Death Devil due to her late arrival on Earth, she later revealed her true identity before being captured and enslaved by her sister.

=== Primal Fear Devils ===
Darkness Devil (闇の悪魔, Yami no Akuma)
A powerful devil who embodies the primal fear of darkness and resides in Hell. It traps Denji and a group of Devil Hunters when they are transported to Hell, instantly killing most of them.
Falling Devil (落下の悪魔, Rakka no Akuma)
A devil embodying the primal fear of falling who works for the Death Devil. She first appears in Tokyo to target Asa and Yoru into a dish for Hell residents so the Death Devil can control them.
Aging Devil (老の悪魔, Oi no Akuma)
A devil embodying the primal fear of aging. It has a good relationship with Public Safety.

== Public Safety Organization ==
The Public Safety Devil Hunters are an organization of government-sanctioned Devil Hunters in Japan who are sent to dispatch Devils and tasked with resolving devil-related incidents on a smaller scale. They are divided into different "special divisions", including in Tokyo and Kyoto, with Tokyo Special Division 4 being an experimental division.

=== Tokyo Special Division 4 ===
Kishibe (岸辺)
Voiced by: Kenjiro Tsuda (Japanese); Jason Douglas (English)
Portrayed by: Masashi Taniguchi (stage play)
The organization's most experienced devil hunter, Kishibe is a cynical veteran formerly of Tokyo Special Division 1. After transferring to Division 4, he trains Denji and Power while secretly opposing Makima, eventually leading the Anti-Makima Squad. He maintains contracts with multiple devils including the Knife, Needle, and Claw Devils.
Aki Hayakawa (早川アキ, Hayakawa Aki)
Voiced by: Shogo Sakata, Ayumu Murase (young) (Japanese); Reagan Murdock, Bryson Baugus (young) (English)
Portrayed by: Mizuki Umetsu (stage play)
A Tokyo Special Division 4 Devil Hunter driven by vengeance against the Gun Devil for killing his family. Initially contracted with the Fox and Curse Devils, he later acquires future sight through the Future Devil. Despite early conflicts, he develops familial bonds with Denji and Power. After losing an arm to the Darkness Devil, he contracts with Makima to protect them, ultimately becoming the Gun Fiend and dying by Denji's hands.
Himeno (姫野)
Voiced by: Mariya Ise (Japanese); Katelyn Barr (English)
Portrayed by: Minami Tsukui (stage play)
Aki's first partner, who had a crush on him, and a late member of Special Division 4 contracted to the Ghost Devil, allowing her to use its invisible right hand from anywhere. She was killed sacrificing her body to the Ghost Devil to protect Aki while fighting Samurai Sword.
Kobeni Higashiyama (東山 コベニ, Higashiyama Kobeni)
Voiced by: Karin Takahashi (Japanese); Bryn Apprill (English)
Portrayed by: Haruki Iwata (stage play)
A 20-year-old Devil Hunter conscripted into Makima's experimental squad to support her nine siblings. Despite her timid nature, she demonstrates exceptional speed and knife proficiency. After surviving encounters with international assassins and the Darkness Devil, she resigns and becomes a fast food worker. She later reencounters Denji, who frightens her in his Chainsaw Devil form but ultimately protects her from Makima.
Hirokazu Arai (荒井 ヒロカズ, Arai Hirokazu)
Voiced by: Taku Yashiro (Japanese); Jarrod Greene (English)
Portrayed by: Kō Kanegae (stage play)
A devil hunter with a Fox Devil contract who was in the same squad as Himeno and Kobeni. He sacrificed himself to protect Kobeni from the yakuza who were hunting Denji.
Fushi (伏)
Voiced by: Chikahiro Kobayashi (Japanese); Christopher Wehkamp (English)
A devil hunter in Tokyo Special Division 4 who was shot dead by lackeys of the Gun Devil.
Madoka (円)
Voiced by: Tadashi Mutō (Japanese); Aaron Campbell (English)
A devil hunter in Tokyo Special Division 4 who resigns after surviving the assassination attempt orchestrated by the Gun Devil and the yakuza.

=== Tokyo Special Division 2 ===
Nomo (野茂)
Voiced by: Kenji Akabane (Japanese); Ryan Negrón (English)
Nomo is a young and tenacious devil hunter in Tokyo Special Division 2 and an old friend of Aki's from his time as a trainee there. He stands up against the Bomb Devil, to allow Aki and Denji to escape and recover.

=== Tokyo Special Division 7 ===
Fumiko Mifune (三船フミコ, Mifune Fumiko)
A public safety devil hunter from Special Division 7 who Yoshida assigns to be Denji's bodyguard in school. She entered into a contract with the STD Devil at the age of 14, which causes anyone with whom she has sex to become a clone in both body and mind, giving her impressive survivability.

=== Kyoto Special Division 1 ===
Michiko Tendo (天童 ミチコ, Tendō Michiko)
Voiced by: Hitomi Ueda (Japanese); Christina Kelly (English)
A devil hunter from Kyoto Division 1, whose life was ruined by the Gun Devil. She is transferred to Tokyo to help train the members of Tokyo Special Division 4. She was killed by American devil hunters with Yutaro and another devil hunter, Subaru, with her corpse later being used alongside her contract by Makima to counter the Gun Devil.
Yutaro Kurose (黒瀬 ユウタロウ, Kurose Yūtarō)
Voiced by: Kengo Kawanishi (Japanese); Adam Gibbs (English)
A devil hunter partnered with Michiko. He was killed by American devil hunters with Michiko and another devil hunter, Subaru, while en route to Tokyo, with his corpse later being used alongside his contract by Makima to counter the Gun Devil.

== Other groups and organizations ==
Individuals who work solo or in groups with private devil hunters. They are similar to bounty hunters and freelancers, meaning that they are not loyal nor officially employed by any government.

=== Japan ===
Hirofumi Yoshida (吉田 ヒロフミ, Yoshida Hirofumi)
A Japanese private sector devil hunter/bodyguard contracted with the Octopus Devil, who is hired to protect Denji while the international assassins hunt for Chainsaw Man. He later attends Fourth East High School, having been tasked with monitoring Denji to maintain a normal life, and is drawn into Asa's team for the Devil Hunter Club. At some point after the international assassins hunt, he joins the Public Safety organization.

==== Yakuza ====
Samurai Sword (サムライソード, Samurai Sōdo) / Katana Man
Voiced by: Daiki Hamano (Japanese); Jason Marnocha (English)
Portrayed by: Orenograffiti (stage play, human form), Shōma Yoshioka (stage play, devil form)
The unnamed Katana Hybrid, grandson of the yakuza boss who ordered Denji's execution. As a human-devil hybrid containing the Katana Devil's heart, he transforms by removing his left hand. Initially captured after his defeat by Denji, he was later weaponized by Makima against him. After Makima's death, he joined Public Safety's Special Division 7 in exchange for yakuza restoration, but ultimately defected to Yoru's faction to oppose Chainsaw Man.
Akane Sawatari (沢渡 アカネ, Sawatari Akane)
Voiced by: Yō Taichi (Japanese); Emi Lo (English)
A former Public Safety hunter who works with the yakuza and is Samurai Sword's handler. She has a contract with the Snake Devil, allowing her to summon it in exchange for one of her fingernails. After Samurai Sword's defeat, her devil commits suicide with her per contract with the Gun Devil before being brought to the authorities. Her corpse is later used alongside her contract by Makima to counter the Gun Devil.

==== Chainsaw Man Church ====
Barem Bridge (バルエム ブリッチ, Baruemu Buritchi)
A hybrid contracted with the Flamethrower Devil, he was first seen as part of Makima's Special Division 5 group of brainwashed hybrids in order to fight Pochita. Following Makima's defeat, he becomes the second-in-command of the Chainsaw Man Church and the Death Devil's right-hand man, with the goal of saving humankind by slaying the Death Devil, unaware of her true identity.

=== China ===
Quanxi (クァンシ, Kwanshi)
Kishibe's former partner in Public Safety and crush; a Chinese devil hunter who Santa Claus states is "the first devil hunter", and one of the assassins sent to steal Denji's heart. She is a lesbian in a polyamorous relationship with four female Fiends. She is a hybrid with the Crossbow Devil, and is able to transform by pulling an arrow out of her right eye socket. She dies after Makima beheads her, but she later revives her along with Reze and Samurai Sword to fight the Chainsaw Man. After Makima's defeat, she returns to work in Public Safety again in exchange for recovering her dead girlfriends corpses, being part of Special Division 7, later rescuing Denji, Nayuta, and Fumiko from the Fire Devil contractors.
Long (ロン, Ron)
One of Quanxi's girlfriend Fiends, who has horns similar to Power's and is able to breathe fire. She dies after being decapitated by the Darkness Devil, and is later turned into a doll by Santa Claus.
Pingtsi (ピンツイ, Pintsui)
One of Quanxi's girlfriend Fiends. A cheerful girl with a sentient creature acting as her ponytail. She dies after being decapitated by the Darkness Devil, and is later turned into a doll by Santa Claus.
Tsugihagi (ツギハギ)
One of Quanxi's girlfriend Fiends. A quiet girl with pale skin and stitches covering her face, thighs and upper arm. She dies after being decapitated by Makima.
Cosmo (コスモ, Kosumo)
The Cosmos Fiend and one of Quanxi's girlfriend Fiends, whose brain is partially exposed and whose right eye hangs from its socket. She has the ability to show the complete knowledge of the universe to her targets, rendering them catatonic and unable to think of anything but Halloween. Her surface personality is presumably the result of her powers affecting herself, never speaking any words besides "Halloween". She dies after being decapitated by Makima.

=== Soviet Union ===
Reze (レゼ)
Voiced by: Reina Ueda (Japanese); Alexis Tipton (English)
A café employee initially presenting romantic interest in Denji, later revealed as a Soviet Bomb Devil hybrid assassin. Capable of transforming via a grenade pin on her neck, she develops genuine feelings for Denji despite her mission. After their confrontation, Makima ends up ambushing and killing her with assistance from the Angel Devil. She is later brainwashed and revived by Makima to fight Pochita.
Santa Claus (サンタ クロース, Santa Kurōsu)
An assassin targeting Denji, initially appearing as an elderly German man before being revealed as a Russian woman controlling multiple bodies through the Doll Devil. Her primary host, Tolka's transformed body, commands a doll hivemind. She attempts to sacrifice Denji and other hunters to the Darkness Devil in exchange for power against Makima. Defeated by Denji and mentally destroyed by Cosmo, she is left incapacitated.

=== United States of America ===
Elder brother of Joey and Aldo
The unnamed elder brother of Joey and Aldo, who is seemingly the most experienced and the leader of the brothers. He has a contract with the Skin Devil, allowing him to impersonate other people. He was killed by Power when she commandeered Kobeni's car and accidentally ran him and Denji over.
Joey (ジョーイ, Jōi)
A Private Sector devil hunter who worked alongside his brother Aldo and his unnamed elder brother. He was killed by Hirofumi Yoshida after witnessing his elder brother's death.
Aldo (アルド, Arudo)
A Private Sector devil hunter from the US who worked alongside his brother Joey and his unnamed elder brother, and is more down-to-earth and cautious. After Santa Claus's defeat, he is the only brother who survives the incident, escaping by pretending to be infected with Cosmo's power.

== Fourth East High School ==
The biggest school in Tokyo, which Denji and Asa attend.

=== Students ===
Yuko (ユウコ, Yūko)
A high school Devil Hunter Club member who befriends Asa. After contracting with the Justice Devil, she gains mind-reading abilities but develops psychopathic tendencies, justifying violent acts in the name of justice. Following her accidental death by Asa and subsequent revival by the Death Devil, her body becomes disfigured. While seeking help from a relative, she is killed by a Chainsaw Man impostor.
Haruka Iseumi (伊勢海 ハルカ, Iseumi Haruka)
The president of the Devil Hunter Club and leader of the student council, as well as the representative of the Chainsaw Man Church. He is an obsessive fan of Chainsaw Man and has a similar starter to Denji on his chest, which is later revealed to have been surgically implanted.
Nobana Higashiyama (東山やまナ, Higashiyama Nobana)
Kobeni's little brother who, like her, was forced into devil hunting through the devil hunter club to support his family's needs. He also works as a tour guide for the Chainsaw Man church.
Miri Sugo (須郷う ミリ, Sugō Miri) / Sword Man (ソードマン, Sōdoman)
A hybrid with the Sword Devil who is first seen as part of Makima's Special Division 5 group of brainwashed hybrids to fight Pochita. Like Samurai Sword, he transforms into his hybrid form by removing his right hand. After being freed from Makima's control following her defeat, he joins the Chainsaw Man church alongside the other Hybrids and enrolls in Fourth East, hoping to recruit and befriend with Denji since he was the one who freed him. He, along with the other Hybrids, are decapitated by Quanxi, but later revived. He later joins Li'l D in her plan to recruit Denji and stop Yoru.
Seigi Akoku (亜国 セイギ, Akoku Seigi)
A member of the Devil Hunter Club who fights with spiked brass knuckles. He loses an eye in the fight against Yuko.
Class president
The unnamed former student council president of Fourth East, who attempted to kill Asa believing she was in a relationship with Tanaka. She had a contract with the Justice Devil, and was killed by Yoru.

=== Faculty and staff ===
Tanaka (田中)
Asa's former homeroom teacher who was in a relationship with the class president despite his crush on Asa. He was killed by Yoru upon her awakening by using his head and spine as a sword.
