= Chu, Tayōsei =

Single by Ano

from the album Nyang Nyang Oeeee
- Released: November 23, 2022
- Genre: J-pop
- Length: 3:05
- Label: Toy's Factory
- Composer: Shuichi Mabe
- Lyricists: Shuichi Mabe; Ano
- Producer: Taku Inoue

Ano singles chronology
"Fuhen" (2022)	"Chu, Tayōsei" (2022)	"Neetneves" (2022)

Music video
- "Chu, Tayōsei" on YouTube

"Chu, Tayōsei" (ちゅ、多様性。; lit. 'Chu, diversity') is a song by Japanese singer Ano from her debut studio album Nyang Nyang Oeeee (2023). It was released on November 23, 2022, through Toy's Factory, as the one of twelve ending themes for anime series Chainsaw Man, which featured on the seventh episode. Ano performed the song at the 74th NHK Kōhaku Uta Gassen on December 31, 2023.

== Accolades ==
Awards and nominations for "Chu, Tayōsei"
Ceremony	Year	Award	Result	Ref.
Reiwa Anisong Awards	2022	Best Lyrics Award	Nominated	
TikTok First-half Trend Awards	2023	Best Music	Nominated	

== Personnel ==
- Ano – vocals, lyrics
- Shuichi Mabe – bass, lyrics, composer
- Taku Inoue – guitars, arrangement
- Kensuke Nishiura – drums
- Masayuki Yoshii – mix engineering

== Charts ==
=== Weekly charts ===
Weekly chart performance for "Chu, Tayōsei"
Chart (2022–2023)	Peak position
Japan (Japan Hot 100)	30
Japan Heatseekers (Billboard Japan)	1
Japan Hot Animation (Billboard Japan)	2
Japan (Oricon)	32
Japan Combined Singles (Oricon)	30

=== Year-end charts ===
Year-end chart performance for "Chu, Tayōsei"
Chart (2023)	Position
Japan (Japan Hot 100)	75
Japan Heatseekers (Billboard Japan)	5
Japan Hot Animation (Billboard Japan)	19

== Certifications ==
Certifications for "Chu, Tayōsei"
Region	Certification	Certified units/sales
Streaming
Japan (RIAJ)	Platinum	100,000,000^{†}
^{†} Streaming-only figures based on certification alone.
