= Ano (singer) =

Japanese singer

- Born: September 4
- Genre: J-pop
- Occupations: Singer; actress; presenter; model
- Instruments: Vocals; guitar
- Years active: 2013–present
- Label: Toy's Factory
- Formerly of: You'll Melt More!
- Website: ano-official.com

Ano (あの; born September 4) is a Japanese singer, songwriter, actress, presenter, and model. A member of the alternative idol group You'll Melt More! from 2013 to 2019, she later had several solo releases, including the album Nyang Nyang Oeeee (2023). She has also had starring roles as Taki in Adam by Eve: A Live in Animation (2022), Ouran Nakagawa in Dead Dead Demon's Dededede Destruction (2024), and Mem-cho in Oshi no Ko (2024), as well as working as a model and presenter.

== Early life ==
Ano was born on September 4. She has an older brother who is a teacher. She struggled with fitting in at school and experienced bullying, having discussed her experiences with such one incident during an appearance on Achikochi Audrey. She dropped out of a high school shortly after enrolling, and quit a part-time job at a supermarket after an argument with one customer.

== Career ==
=== Singing ===
After seeing a recruitment ad for You'll Melt More! on Twitter, Ano decided to apply for the idol group, feeling the group seemed incomplete to her. Although she had originally seen music as a hobby and, as she later recalled in an interview, not good with auditions and interviews, she was able to join without either at the invitation of the group's producer after entering a room with the existing members. She was part of You'll Melt More! from September 2013 until September 30, 2019.

Ano made her solo music debut in 2020 with the digital single "Delete", credited with her name in Latin-script lower-caps. In August 2021, she formed the band I's as vocalist and guitarist. On April 8, 2022, she released with Toy's Factory her major debut single "Aida", the ending theme song of Tiger & Bunny 2.

On December 13, 2023, Ano debuted her first album, Nyang Nyang Oeeee; it charted at #9 at the Oricon Albums Chart. She performed "Chu, Tayōsei" at the 74th NHK Kōhaku Uta Gassen; this was her first time she performed on the special. On January 1, 2024, she released "You and I Heaven", a song for which she wrote the lyrics and music. Later that year, she performed "Iinazukkyun", the opening theme song of the 2024 Ranma ½ anime. On January 14, 2025, she announced her first concert at the Nippon Budokan in Tokyo on September 3.

=== Modeling, acting, and hosting ===
In March 2019, Ano released ANOther, her debut photo book. She later released two more digital-only supplements to ANOther in April 2019, each featuring additional shoots done in Ibusuki and Cambodia. In July 2019, she also released a series of collaboration products with the fashion brand Hatra, collectively called Ghost Plant.

Ano hosted the variety show Ano Channel on TV Asahi from October 2020 to September 2021; after a few one-off airings, it returned to TV Asahi in October 2024. In April 2021, she opened Ano-chan-chi (あのちゃんち), an a la carte subscription channel on CyberZ's streaming service Openrec.tv. In April 2023, she began hosting the Tuesday radio show Ano's All Night Nippon Zero on Nippon Broadcasting System.

Ano appeared in the 2022 Netflix film Adam by Eve: A Live in Animation, portraying the character Taki. She starred as Mem-cho in the live-action adaptation of Oshi no Ko; as part of the drama, she also formed the live-action counterpart of the B-Komachi trio. In 2024, she and Lilas Ikuta co-starred in Dead Dead Demon's Dededede Destruction and performed "Zezezezettai Seiiki", the theme song of the first half of the movie.

== Public image ==
While with You'll Melt More!, Ano become known for jumping into the audience and screaming during performances, earning her a reputation among the industry and fans for being an "unusual idol" and causing people to say "If Kanna Hashimoto is an angel, she's a devil". She was widely known for her charisma among underground idols, and the "Ano gals" (あのギャル, Ano gyaru) trend, where Ano's fashion, hair styles, and even idol member color, rose to popularity. Her fashion also inspired a style called mizuiro kaiwai (水色界隈; lt. "light blue neighborhood"), referring to her light blue member color.

On October 31, 2024, Nikkei Trendy selected Ano and Ren Meguro as one of their two Faces of the Year.

== Personal life ==
On May 26, 2022, Ano confirmed that she had fractured two facial bones due to a motorcycle accident. On October 10, 2022, she sustained injuries in her head and right hand and had seven stitches in the former.

She is a close friend of comedian Natsu Ando and actress Tsubasa Honda. One of her interests is human teeth, particularly people with crooked teeth.

Ano is a former holder of the comedy DDT Pro-Wrestling Ironman Heavymetalweight Championship.

== Discography ==
=== Studio albums ===
Title	Year	Details	Peak chart positions		Sales	Ref.
Title	Year	Details	JPN	JPN Comb.	Sales	Ref.
Nyang Nyang Oeeee	2023	Released: December 13, 2023; Label: Toy's Factory	9	13	—	
Bone Born Bomb	2025	Released: June 4, 2025; Label: Toy's Factory	6	12	JPN: 5,225	
"—" denotes releases that did not chart or were not released in that region.

=== Singles ===
Title	Year	Details	Peak chart positions		Sales	Ref.
Title	Year	Details	JPN	JPN Comb.	Sales	Ref.
"Delete" (デリート)	2020	Released: September 4, 2020; Format: Digital	—	—	—	
"Chu, Tayōsei" (ちゅ、多様性。)	2022	Released: November 23, 2022; Label: Toy's Factory	32	30	—	
"You & I Heaven" (YOU&愛Heaven)	2024	Released: January 1, 2024	8	—	—	
"Zezezezettai Seiiki" (絶絶絶絶対聖域) (with Lilas Ikuta)	2024	Released: March 20, 2024; Label: Toy's Factory	13	—	—	
"From The First Take"	2024	Released: April 20, 2024	20	—	—	
"Aishiteru, Nante ne" (愛してる、なんてね。)	2024	Released: August 21, 2024; Label: Toy's Factory	18	—	—	
"Iinazukkyun" (許婚っきゅん)	2024	Released: October 9, 2024; Label: Toy's Factory	17	—	—	
"Kashippanashi Destiny" (貸しっぱなしディスティニー)/"Mata Kaettekita Kero! to March" (また帰ってきたケロッ！とマーチ)	2026	Released: June 3, 2026; Label: Toy's Factory	—	—	—	
"—" denotes releases that did not chart or were not released in that region.

== Filmography ==
=== Film ===
Year	Title	Role	Notes	Ref.
2022	Adam by Eve: A Live in Animation	Taki		
2024	Dead Dead Demon's Dededede Destruction	Ouran Nakagawa		
2026	New Theatrical Movie Keroro Gunsō: Upon Revival, Immediately Facing the Threat of Earth's Destruction!	Researcher Robot		

=== Television ===
Year	Title	Role	Notes	Ref.
2020–21; 2024–present	Ano Channel	Herself		
2024	Oshi no Ko	Mem-cho		
2025	The Laughing Salesman			
2026	The Flowers of Evil	Nakamura		

== Awards and nominations ==
=== Berlin Music Video Awards ===
The Berlin Music Video Awards is an international festival that promotes the art of music videos.

Year	Nominated work	Award	Result	Ref
2026	"Picaresque Hero"	Best Art Direction	Nominated	
