= MTV Japan =

Japanese music television channel

- Country: Japan
- Headquarters: Akasaka, Minato, Tokyo

Programming
- Languages: Japanese; English
- Picture format: 1080i HDTV (downscaled to 480i for the SD feed)

Ownership
- Owner: Amdocs Japan Co., Ltd. (under license from Paramount Networks EMEAA)

History
- Launched: November 15, 1993; 32 years ago (original); January 1, 2001; 25 years ago (revival)

Links
- Website: https://www.mtvjapan.com

MTV Japan (Music Television Japan) is the Japanese version of the cable television network based in Tokyo, Japan. It is owned by Amdocs Japan under license from Paramount Networks EMEAA and was launched on November 15, 1993.

== History ==
MTV originally was a music block on ABC TV in the Kansai area from 1984 to 1988, then it became a block on Tokyo Broadcasting System, Japan's largest commercial television station, in the Kanto area from 1988 to 1992. In 1988, it was shown late Tuesday nights between 1:20am and 4:20am, and late Friday nights between 2:55am and 4:50am.

In 1992, Music Channel, Inc. acquired a license from Viacom to broadcast with the MTV name. Broadcast began on CS Analog and Skyport services, with PerfecTV! accessed added in 1996 and DirecTV access added in 1997. Notable VJs from that time include Marc Panther and Ken Lloyd.

In 1998, Music Channel canceled their license with Viacom because of the high license fee required. Consequently, from 1999 the station changed its name to Vibe and shifted its content focus from Western music to domestic music products. Without the MTV brand name behind it, competition from other channels such as Space Shower TV and Sony Music Japan's Viewsic (now Music On! TV) led to the station being acquired by H&Q Asia Pacific in 2000.

Also in 2000, MTV Broadcasting Japan, Inc., a separate company formed by groups like CSK and Sega, acquired a broadcast license from SKY PerfecTV!. However, the company never broadcast under the MTV name; it changed its name to M-BROS and broadcast under that name on both DirecTV and SKY PerfecTV! until April 30, 2002.

Following this attempt to use the MTV name (and perhaps because of it), Viacom once again formed a contract with Music Channel, and created a revival of MTV Japan on January 1, 2001, this time under the umbrella of MTV Networks and with the support of MTV capital. Music Channel, Inc. also changed its company name to MTV Japan, Inc. at this time. The first video played on MTV Japan was bird's "Mind Travel."

The Vibe name carries on in its Internet activities, which were spun off from the channel as VIBE, Inc. This company was integrated into Bandai Networks in 2005.

There is a marked difference in this revival of MTV Japan when contrasted to the old MTV Japan. The older MTV Japan focused on overseas artists, whereas the current MTV Japan focuses on domestic artists. As a result, the channel has drawn criticism from proponents of the older MTV Japan. However, in March 2006 the network drew 6,000,000 viewers, making the channel second to Space Shower TV and an overall financial success.

In August 2006, MTV Japan was made a complete subsidiary of MTV Networks and again made a complete subsidiary of Viacom International Media Networks on December 1, 2014. This was to consolidate its activities with other Viacom subsidiaries in Japan, such as Nickelodeon Japan and the FLUX Digital Content Service.

Some of the most popular musical acts such as Ayumi Hamasaki and Tohoshinki have received several awards from this channel and performed numerous times on its awards show.
