= Chainsaw Man =

Japanese manga series by Tatsuki Fujimoto

- First tankōbon volume cover, featuring Denji in his Devil-human hybrid form, Chainsaw Man

チェンソーマン (Chensō Man)
- Genre: Action; Comedy horror; Dark fantasy
- Manga
- Written by: Tatsuki Fujimoto
- Published by: Shueisha
- English publisher: NA: Viz Media
- Imprint: Jump Comics
- Magazine: Weekly Shōnen Jump; (December 3, 2018 – December 14, 2020); Shōnen Jump+; (July 13, 2022 – March 25, 2026)
- English magazine: NA: Weekly Shonen Jump
- Original run: December 3, 2018 – March 25, 2026
- Volumes: 24
- Anime television series
- Chainsaw Man (2022)
- Anime film
- Chainsaw Man – The Movie: Reze Arc (2025)
- icon

Chainsaw Man (Japanese: チェンソーマン, Hepburn: Chensō Man) is a Japanese manga series written and illustrated by Tatsuki Fujimoto. Its first arc was serialized in Shueisha's shōnen manga magazine Weekly Shōnen Jump from December 2018 to December 2020; its second arc was serialized in Shueisha's Shōnen Jump+ app and website from July 2022 to March 2026. Its chapters were collected in 24 tankōbon volumes.

Chainsaw Man follows the story of Denji, an impoverished teenager who makes a contract that fuses his body with that of Pochita, a dog-like Chainsaw Devil, granting him the ability to transform parts of his body into chainsaws. Denji eventually joins the Public Safety Devil Hunters, a government agency focused on combating Devils whenever they become a threat to Japan. The second arc of the story focuses on Asa Mitaka, a high school student who enters into a contract with Yoru, the War Devil, who forces her to hunt down Chainsaw Man and seek revenge against him for her near-destruction.

In North America, the manga is licensed in English by Viz Media, for both print and digital release, and it is also published by Shueisha on the Manga Plus online platform. An anime television series adaptation, produced by MAPPA, was broadcast from October to December 2022. An anime film, titled Chainsaw Man – The Movie: Reze Arc, premiered in September 2025. An anime adaptation of the "Assassins" arc has been announced.

By June 2026, the manga had over 36 million copies in circulation. In 2021, it won the 66th Shogakukan Manga Award in the shōnen category and won the Harvey Award in the Best Manga category from 2021 to 2023. Chainsaw Man has been overall well-received by critics, who have praised its storytelling, characters, and dark humor, with its violent scenes being particularly highlighted within the context of the story.

== Synopsis ==
=== Setting ===
The series is set in the late 1990s, in an alternative timeline where the Soviet Union still exists. Devils (悪魔, Akuma) are born from the collective fears of humanity, and grow more powerful as those fears grow more common. Specialist operatives known as Devil Hunters (デビルハンター, Debiru Hantā) are tasked with eliminating them and can form contracts with them to gain their abilities in return. A Devil possessing a human body (usually deceased) is known as a Fiend (魔人, Majin), while certain individuals can become hybrids by merging with Devils. Devils can reincarnate, cycling between Hell and Earth; when killed on Earth, it reappears in Hell, and if killed in Hell, returns to Earth. A unique exception to this cycle is the Chainsaw Devil, whose consumption of another Devil has erased the concept that Devil represented both from existence and human memory. As a result, the Holocaust, AIDS, and nuclear weapons are forgotten.

=== Plot ===
Denji is a teenager living in poverty who works as a Devil Hunter to pay off his deceased father's debt to the yakuza. He is aided by Pochita, his canine companion and the Chainsaw Devil. After the yakuza betray and kill Denji in a deal with the Zombie Devil, Pochita merges with Denji, reviving him as a hybrid on the condition that he live a humble, ordinary life. By pulling a cord in his chest, Denji transforms into Chainsaw Man and kills the yakuza and the Zombie Devil.

Denji is subsequently recruited by the government-run Public Safety Division, a unit of professional Devil Hunters led by Makima, who assigns him to hunt the Gun Devil. Denji is partnered with Aki Hayakawa, an experienced Devil Hunter, and Power, a Fiend created from the Blood Devil. Makima is later revealed to be the Control Devil, whose true goal is to dominate Pochita, as his ability to consume Devils allows him to erase the fears and concepts they embody from existence. The Gun Devil is deployed by the United States to eliminate Makima, but she defeats it and forces it to possess Aki as the Gun Fiend; Denji is forced to kill him in self-defense. Makima also later kills Power in front of Denji, rendering him catatonic and forcing Pochita to take over his body. Denji eventually manages to kill Makima and, in the aftermath, is entrusted with the care of Nayuta, a young girl who is the reincarnation of the Control Devil.

Asa Mitaka, a socially withdrawn high school student, forms a contract with the War Devil, Yoru, after being killed by a classmate who made a contract with the Justice Devil. Now a Fiend with Yoru inhabiting her body, Asa seeks to break their pact, while Yoru secretly plans to revive the Nuclear Weapons Devil and seek revenge against Chainsaw Man for her near-destruction. Meanwhile, Denji balances his life as a student and as Chainsaw Man while caring for Nayuta. Fami, a girl claiming to be the Famine Devil, manipulates events to delay the Death Devil's arrival. After Barem Bridge—the second-in-command of the cult-like project Chainsaw Man Church, secretly controlled by Fami—destroys Denji's home and kills his pets, Nayuta seemingly sacrifices herself. Denji is imprisoned and harvested for parts before being rescued by Asa, Yoru, and Fami.

Empowered by humanity's growing fear of war, Yoru offers Denji a new deal: defeat the Death Devil and earn Asa's affection or be transformed. The pair clash with the Falling Devil, and Yoru defeats it after America reinvents the nuclear bomb. Denji is left for dead but is saved by Fami, who turns out to be the Death Devil, Li'l D. Li'l D explains that Yoru intends to cause an infinite war by having Pochita erase death. Some time later, Barem appears and an enraged Denji gives Pochita control to devour him. Afterwards, Pochita duels Yoru while Denji and Asa meet in a separate dimension. Asa decides to sacrifice herself to allow Denji to kill Yoru. Pochita instead devours Li'l D. Yoru seemingly kills Pochita, but Denji emerges in a new hybrid form and defeats Yoru.

The erasure of death causes insect-based Devils to become more powerful, bringing about a global apocalypse. After being devoured by a Devil, Denji and Pochita find themselves in an open field. Pochita realizes that becoming Denji's heart caused his trauma. After saying goodbye, Pochita devours his own heart, erasing himself. In a new reality, Denji wakes up alone in a shack. The yakuza take him to an abandoned warehouse where they nearly kill him when Power arrives and saves him with her blood-related abilities, permanently linking the two. Shortly afterwards, Nayuta, now working for Public Safety, recruits Denji and Power as Devil Hunters. They are sent to kill a Devil at a school, where Denji meets Asa, who has never been possessed by Yoru. She thanks Denji, who is wielding a chainsaw, calling him Chainsaw Man—triggering a remnant of Pochita that still resides in him—before returning to her classmates. Denji and Power then depart to get money for food.

== Production ==
Despite the series's violent content and dark humor, Tatsuki Fujimoto always intended to serialize in Weekly Shōnen Jump. However, he believed his work would be overlooked if he created a conventional "Jump-like manga", so he consciously preserved his individual style while adopting the magazine's typical narrative structure and character archetypes. Fujimoto was inspired by the 1974 film The Texas Chain Saw Massacre to create the series. Following its success, Fujimoto chose to publish the second part of Chainsaw Man on Shōnen Jump+ to explore a completely different direction. He noted minimal differences in the editorial processes between the two publications, stating that while a few depictions were adjusted at the rough draft stage, he was granted full creative freedom regarding the story's logic.

Fujimoto drew inspiration from various sources. Although his schedule during the serialization was demanding, he actively consumed new media and incorporated elements from them into his work. On Twitter, he cited the final battle in the 2016 film Kizumonogatari Part 3: Reiketsu as a direct influence for the climax of the series's first part. Fujimoto has described the series as a "copycat of Dorohedoro and Jujutsu Kaisen"; he also described it as a "wicked FLCL" and a "pop Abara." While Fujimoto had planned certain story elements from the outset, others were developed during serialization. He intentionally left various concepts vague and open-ended to facilitate the narrative expansion in the second part. In an interview with the magazine Da Vinci, when asked what readers could expect from the second part, he cited the 1998 film The Big Lebowski, saying that it left him questioning the ending and feeling like it was all for nothing. He noted, however, that the protagonist and story had developed. He also loved "this sublime absurdity" and hoped to give readers "that kind of aftertaste".

== Media ==
=== Manga ===
Written and illustrated by Tatsuki Fujimoto, the first part of Chainsaw Man, "Public Safety Arc" (公安編, Kōan-hen), was serialized in Shueisha's shōnen manga anthology Weekly Shōnen Jump from December 3, 2018, to December 14, 2020. Following the series's conclusion in Weekly Shōnen Jump, a second part was announced to start on Shueisha's Shōnen Jump+ online magazine. On December 19, 2020, it was announced that the second part, "School Arc" (学校編, Gakkō-hen), would feature Denji going to school. The second part was serialized from July 13, 2022, to March 25, 2026. Shueisha collected its chapters in 24 tankōbon volumes, released from March 4, 2019, to June 4, 2026.

In North America, Viz Media published the series's first two chapters on their Weekly Shonen Jump digital magazine for its "Jump Start" initiative. The series was then published on the Shonen Jump digital platform after the cancellation of Weekly Shonen Jump. Shueisha simultaneously published the series in English on the app and website Manga Plus starting in January 2019. In February 2020, Viz Media announced the digital and print release of the manga. Viz Media posted an official trailer for the manga, featuring a high-octane opera vocals as its soundtrack. The first volume was released on October 6, 2020. As of June 2, 2026, 21 volumes have been released.

=== Anime ===
A 12-episode anime television series adaptation, produced by MAPPA, was broadcast on TV Tokyo and its affiliates from October 12 to December 28, 2022. (Note: TV Tokyo listed the air dates on Tuesday at 24:00, which is effectively Wednesday at midnight JST.)

==== Film ====
An anime film, titled Chainsaw Man – The Movie: Reze Arc (劇場版 チェンソーマン レゼ篇, Gekijō-ban Chensō Man Reze-hen), premiered in Japan on September 19, 2025.

==== Sequel ====
At the Jump Festa '26 event on December 21, 2025, an anime sequel, Chainsaw Man – Assassins Arc (チェンソーマン 刺客篇, Chensō Man Shikaku-hen), was announced.

=== Novel ===
A novel, titled Chainsaw Man: Buddy Stories (チェンソーマン バディ・ストーリーズ, Chensō Man Badi Sutōrīzu), written by Sakaku Hishikawa, with illustrations by Tatsuki Fujimoto, was published on November 4, 2021. It tells three stories focused on a theme of "buddies" about Power and Denji, Kishibe and Quanxi during their partner era, and Himeno and Aki around the time they first met.

Viz Media licensed the novel and released it on July 25, 2023.

=== Stage plays ===
On December 29, 2022, it was announced that the series would receive a stage play adaptation, directed and written by Fumiya Matsuzaki, music composed by Shunsuke Wada and choreographed by Hidali. Titled Chainsaw Man The Stage (『チェンソーマン』ザ・ステージ, Chensō Man za Sutēji), it ran in Tokyo from September 16 to October 1 at The Galaxy Theatre, and in Kyoto from October 6–9, 2023, at the Kyoto Theater. The cast includes Naotake Tsuchiya as Denji, Mizuki Umetsu as Aki Hayakawa, Mahiru Coda as Power, Minami Tsukui as Himeno, Haruki Iwata as Kobeni Higashiyama, and Aya Hirano as Makima.

A second stage play, adapting the Reze Arc, titled Chainsaw Man The Stage: Reze Arc (『チェンソーマン』ザ・ステージ レゼ篇, Chensōman za Sutēji Reze-hen), ran in Tokyo at the Tennozu Galaxy Theater from July 25 to August 2, 2026, and in Kyoto at the Kyoto Theater from August 7–12 of the same year. The cast and staff from the first stage play returned to reprise their roles, in addition to Yui Yokoyama as Reze, Yutaro as Angel Devil, Hayate Kajihara as Beam, Masahide Funaki as Violence Fiend, Masahide Tada and Yutaka Nakasone as Chainsaw Man, and Mai Kaida and Mayu Ikeda as Bomb Devil.

=== Video games ===
A free browser game was released on August 4, 2023, to commemorate the release of the fifteenth volume of the manga.

A smartphone game was announced at the "MAPPA 15th Anniversary Lineup Reveal" livestream event on June 19, 2026. The game will feature an opening animated sequence by MAPPA with a song by Maximum the Hormone titled "All the Mince!!! All the Mince!!".

A crossover collaboration with the mobile video game BanG Dream! Girls Band Party!, ran from December 15–25, 2024. The collaboration included five characters from the game in the style of five respective Chainsaw Man characters, two covers of the anime theme songs "Chainsaw Blood" and "Fighting Song", login gifts, and more. The crossover also included a limited-time "Chainsaw Ampl'if'ier" event, which lasted until December 23.

=== Other media ===
An exhibition, "Chainsaw Man Manga Exhibition", ran at the Space Hachikai gallery area of Tower Records, Shibuya, from June 12 to July 4, 2021.

Good Smile Company launched Nendoroid figures based on characters from the series in October 2021, including Denji, Pochita and Power. Denji made a cameo in the superhero manga series My Hero Academia in chapter 259, as part of the hero raid in the Paranormal War Liberation arc.

From September 6 to November 4, 2024, Universal Studios Japan hosted the "Chainsaw Man × Hollywood Dream – The Ride (Kick Back)" attraction based on the series, as part of the Halloween Horror Nights event. Another attraction was the reverse-facing roller coaster "Hollywood Dream – The Ride (Backdrop)".

On August 2, 2026, Crunchyroll and Three Ten Merchandising Services announced that they would be collaborating on the second phase of an immersive experience event—which also includes the sale of collectibles—called The Loop, which would be themed around the anime series, along with Jujutsu Kaisen and The Apothecary Diaries, and takes place from August 22 to October 18 at the Westfield Topanga Mall in Canoga Park, California.

== Reception ==
=== Popularity ===
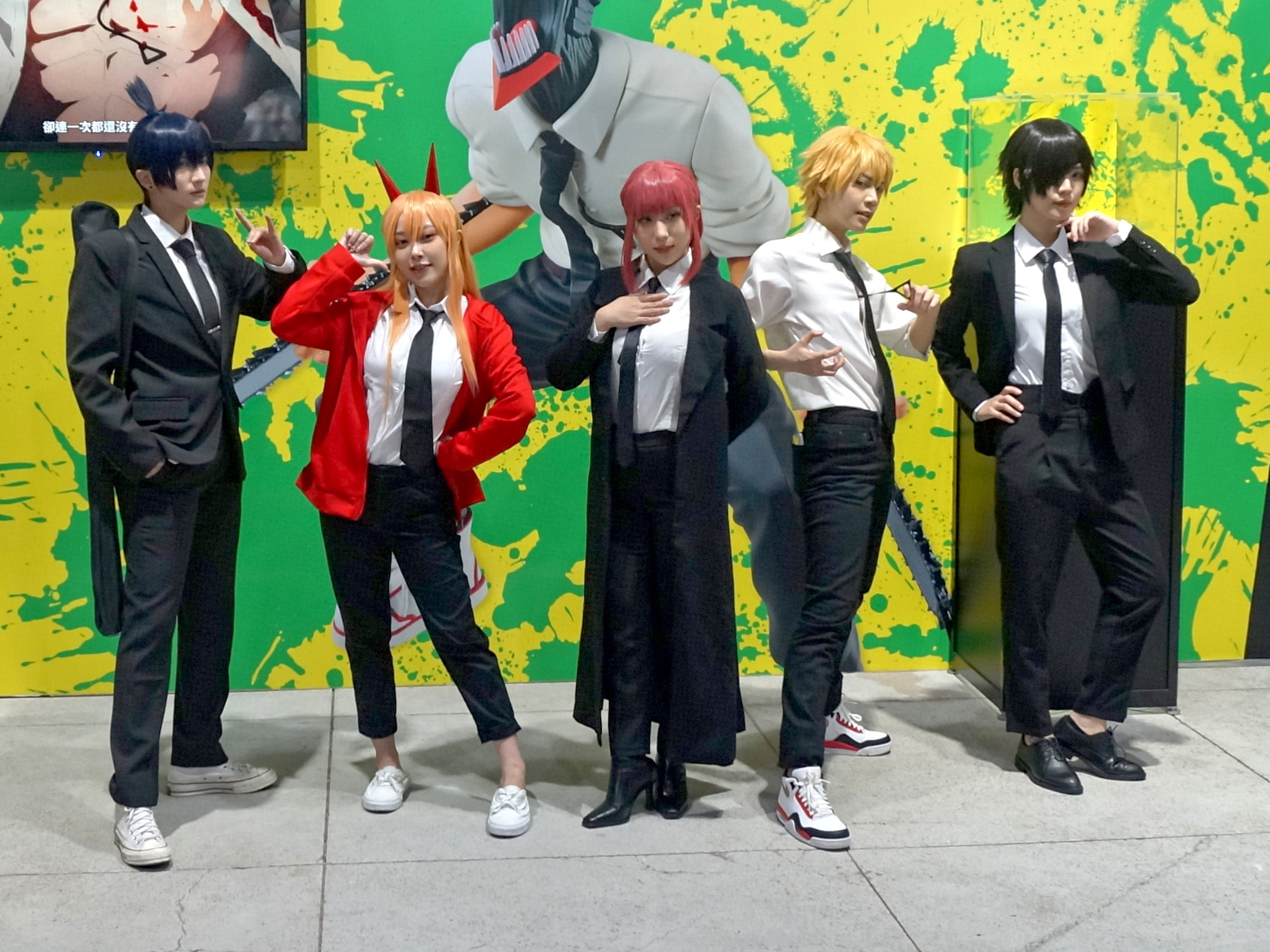
Fans cosplaying as characters from the series in 2022. From left to right: Aki Hayakawa, Power, Makima, Denji, and Himeno

Chainsaw Man ranked fourth on Takarajimasha's Kono Manga ga Sugoi! list of best manga of 2020 for male readers, and topped the 2021 list. On Freestyle magazine's The Best Manga 2020 Kono Manga wo Yome! list, the series ranked twelfth, and sixteenth along with Demon Slayer: Kimetsu no Yaiba, on the 2021 list; and 25th on the 2025 list. It ranked second, behind Spy × Family, on "Nationwide Bookstore Employees' Recommended Comics of 2020" by the Honya Club online bookstore. In 2020, Chainsaw Man ranked tenth in the "Most Wanted Anime Adaptation" poll conducted by AnimeJapan. The series ranked 45th on the 2020 "Book of the Year" list by Da Vinci magazine; it ranked 43rd on the 2021 list. On TV Asahi's Manga Sōsenkyo 2021 poll, in which 150,000 people voted for their top 100 manga series, Chainsaw Man ranked 58th.

The series placed twelfth on the annual Twitter Japan's Trend Awards in 2021, based on the social network's top trending topics of the year.

=== Sales ===
By August 2020, the manga had over 3 million copies in circulation; it had over 4.2 million copies in circulation by October 2020; over 5 million copies in circulation by December 2020; over 6.4 million copies in circulation by January 2021; over 9.3 million copies in circulation by March 2021; over 11 million copies in circulation by June 2021; over 12 million copies in circulation by December 2021; over 13 million copies in circulation by June 2022; over 15 million copies in circulation by August 2022; over 16 million copies in circulation by September 2022; over 18 million copies in circulation by October 2022; over 20 million copies in circulation by November 2022; over 23 million copies in circulation by January 2023; over 24 million copies in circulation by May 2023; over 26 million copies in circulation by August 2023; over 27 million copies in circulation by May 2024; over 28 million copies in circulation by August 2024; over 29 million copies in circulation by November 2024; over 30 million copies in circulation by December 2024; over 31 million copies in circulation by October 2025; over 32 million copies in circulation by November 2025; over 34 million copies in circulation by December 2025; over 35 million copies in circulation by January 2026; and over 36 million copies in circulation by June 2026.

Chainsaw Man was the fifth best-selling manga series in the first half of 2021 (period between November 2020 and May 2021), with over 4 million copies sold. In 2021, it was the seventh best-selling manga with over 5 million copies sold. It was the second best-selling manga series in the first half of 2023 (period between November 2022 and May 2023), with over 4.4 million copies sold, while volumes 12–14 were among the best-selling manga volumes from the same period. Volumes 13 and 14 were among the best-selling manga volumes of 2023. Volume 14 was Shueisha's sixth highest first print run manga volume of 2023–2024 (period from April 2023 to March 2024), with 800,000 copies printed; volume 17 had an initial print run of 500,000 copies, making it the publisher's eighth highest first print run manga volume of 2024–2025 (period from April 2024 to March 2025).

In North America, the volumes of Chainsaw Man were ranked on Circana (formerly NPD) BookScan's monthly top 20 adult graphic novels list since October 2020. They were also ranked on The New York Times' Graphic Books and Manga bestseller monthly list since April 2021. According to ICv2, Chainsaw Man was the tenth best-selling manga franchise for Q4 2021 (September–December) in the United States, and it was also the third "most efficient manga franchise" for retailer bookshelves, based on the website's calculations of which manga franchises had the highest sales per volume. According to NPD BookScan, the first three volumes of Chainsaw Man were ranked among the top 20 highest-selling manga volumes in 2021; it was the best-selling manga series in 2022, with eight volumes featured on the top 20 highest-selling manga volumes; four volumes were among the top 20 highest-selling manga volumes in 2023. The first volume sold 18,000 copies in the United States in 2020, and the eight volumes collectively sold 623,000 copies in 2021.

=== Critical reception ===
Chainsaw Man has been overall well-received by critics. James Beckett of Anime News Network awarded the first volume a B+, praising its eccentric blend of humor, violence, and emotional depth. He highlighted its compelling world-building and character development, noting that the series distinguished itself through its unapologetically chaotic yet earnest execution. Nicholas Dupree, also writing for Anime News Network, described the series as a bizarre yet unforgettable experience, unmatched in its unpredictability. Hannah Collins of Comic Book Resources lauded the series for balancing supernatural action with poignant character moments, calling it a potential future classic. Julia Lee of Polygon commended its graphic action and darkly comedic narrative, citing it as one of Weekly Shōnen Jump's standout new titles. Sheena McNeil of Sequential Tart awarded the first volume a 9/10, drawing comparisons to works like Army of Darkness, Devilman, and Dorohedoro while praising its distinct appeal.

Anna Neatrour of Manga Report highlighted Denji's damaged yet compelling characterization and the series's effective mix of gore and humor. Danica Davidson of Otaku USA noted its bizarre yet heartfelt execution, acknowledging its commercial success in Japan. Katherine Dacey of The Manga Critic expressed mixed feelings, acknowledging its polarizing yet undeniably unique appeal. Ian Wolf of Anime UK News rated the first volume 6/10, praising its action sequences but critiquing its lack of depth in writing.

Fujimoto's artwork garnered particular praise. Collins commended his thick, expressive linework for enhancing the series's gritty atmosphere. Dupree lauded the increasingly surreal and unsettling devil designs as the story progressed. Beckett acknowledged the initially generic character designs but praised the dynamic clarity during action sequences. McNeil noted that while human character designs were unremarkable, the devils and gore were visually striking. Dacey found some devil designs uninspired but noted others elicited strong reactions. Wolf considered the art the manga's strongest aspect, particularly in its action scenes.

==== Themes ====
Critics noted that Chainsaw Man employed graphic violence and gore in ways that enhanced its narrative. Dupree highlighted its irreverent tone and visceral action as distinguishing features. Collins observed that the gore contributed to the series's unfiltered and raw atmosphere. McNeil described the violence as absurd yet balanced by underlying humanity. Davidson acknowledged its gruesome nature but found it thematically appropriate. Lee noted that the extreme gore set it apart from conventional shōnen manga, fitting its dark premise. Dacey characterized it as a battle manga that pushed boundaries with excessive violence. Beckett acknowledged that while the series reveled in bloodshed and crude humor, it risked alienating some readers.

Adi Tantimedh of Bleeding Cool described the characters as socially marginalized individuals, interpreting the narrative as a critique of societal dehumanization. Collins noted the series's premise is "loosely" comparable to Jujutsu Kaisen, but argued Denji subverts the shōnen protagonist mold, with his "life on the fringes of society" resembling a "Dickensian parable about the plight of the working class." Dacey found Denji a more flawed and realistic teenage protagonist, but struggled to connect with him. Lee noted that while Denji's simplistic motivations could be repetitive, the introduction of complex side characters like Power and Makima elevated the narrative.

Tantimedh praised the series's deadpan comedic timing, stating that its slapstick elements prevented it from becoming overly grim. Beckett likened its tone to a fusion of raunchy comedy, Hellboy, and The Evil Dead. Dupree highlighted its crass, nihilistic humor as a deliberate contrast to more "bleedingly sincere and family-friendly" titles like One Piece and My Hero Academia. Neatrour appreciated its offbeat and juvenile comedy. Wolf found the humor simplistic but fitting the series's absurdity.

Dacey noted moments of genuine pathos, particularly in Denji's bond with Pochita and his fraught relationship with Makima. Davidson similarly emphasized the emotional core of Denji and Pochita's connection. Dupree argued that beneath its nihilistic exterior, the series conveyed a cynical yet heartfelt struggle for meaning. Reiichi Narima of Real Sound interpreted the first-part finale as a tragic love story, praising its seinen-like maturity within a shōnen framework.

=== Awards and nominations ===
Year	Award	Category	Result	Ref.
2019	5th Next Manga Award	Print	2nd Place	
2019	3rd annual Tsutaya Comic Award	Next Break	9th Place	
2020	13th Manga Taishō	Manga Taishō	8th Place	
2021	66th Shogakukan Manga Award	Best Shōnen Manga	Won	
2021	Harvey Award	Best Manga	Won	
2021	27th Manga Barcelona	Best Shōnen Manga	Won	
2022	Japan Expo Awards	Daruma for Best Drawing	Won	
2022	Japan Expo Awards	Daruma for Best Screenplay	Won	
2022	Japan Expo Awards	Daruma for Best Action Manga	Won	
2022	Eisner Award	Best U.S. Edition of International Material—Asia	Nominated	
2022	Harvey Award	Best Manga	Won	
2023	Japan Expo Awards	Daruma for Best Manga	Won	
2023	Harvey Award	Best Manga	Won	
2024	51st Angoulême International Comics Festival	Official Selection	Nominated	
