= List of Chainsaw Man chapters =

Cover of the first tankōbon, released in Japan by Shueisha on March 4, 2019

Chainsaw Man is a Japanese manga series written and illustrated by Tatsuki Fujimoto. The series' first part, the "Public Safety Arc" (公安編, Kōan-hen), covered in the first 97 chapters, ran in Shueisha's shōnen manga anthology Weekly Shōnen Jump from December 3, 2018, to December 14, 2020; following the series' conclusion in Weekly Shōnen Jump, a second part was announced to start on Shueisha's Shōnen Jump+ online magazine. On December 19, 2020, it was announced that the second part, the "School Arc" (学校編, Gakkō-hen), would feature Denji going to school. The second part was serialized from July 13, 2022, to March 25, 2026. Shueisha collected its chapters in 24 tankōbon volumes, released from March 4, 2019, to June 4, 2026.

In North America, Viz Media published the series' first two chapters on their Weekly Shonen Jump digital magazine for its "Jump Start" initiative. The series was then published on the Shonen Jump digital platform after the cancellation of Weekly Shonen Jump. Shueisha also simulpublished the series in English on the app and website Manga Plus starting in January 2019. In February 2020, Viz Media announced the digital and print release of the manga. The first volume was released on October 6, 2020. As of March 3, 2026, 20 volumes have been released.

== Volumes ==
No.	Title	Original release date	English release date
1	Dog & Chainsaw; Inu to Chensō (犬とチェンソー)	March 4, 2019; 978-4-08-881780-4	October 6, 2020; 978-1-9747-0993-9
1. "Dog & Chainsaw" (犬とチェンソー, Inu to Chensō); 2. "The Place Where Pochita Is" (ポチタの行方, Pochita no Yukue); 3. "Arrival in Tokyo" (東京到着, Tōkyō Tōchaku); 4. "Power" (力(パワー), Pawā); 5. "A Way to Touch Some Boobs" (胸を揉む方法, Mune o Momu Hōhō); 6. "Service" (使役, Shieki); 7. "Meowy's Whereabouts" (ニャーコの行方, Nyāko no Yukue)
Denji, an impoverished teenager, works to pay off his deceased father's debts to the yakuza as a Devil Hunter using his dog-like companion, the Chainsaw Devil Pochita. Shortly after his father's funeral, Denji gave Pochita blood to heal the Devil's wounds. The yakuza group are enslaved after entering a contract with the Zombie Devil and betray Denji, dismembering the young Devil Hunter. Pochita sacrifices its heart, reviving him as the Devil-human hybrid Chainsaw Man, who then kills the Zombie Devil and the yakuza. Makima, an officer of the Public Safety Devil Hunters, arrives too late to stop the violence; she surprisingly hugs Chainsaw Man, transforming him back to Denji. Makima buys Denji a meal, but before he can eat, she orders him to rescue a girl kidnapped by the Muscle Devil; after he returns, successful, Makima feeds him. At Public Safety Tokyo Headquarters, Makima assigns Denji to a mentor, Aki Hayakawa, who leads an experimental squad; Denji and Aki share an instant, mutual dislike. Denji kills a fiend, which is a Devil that has taken over a human's body, as their first assignment together; afterwards, another fiend Power (Blood Devil) is assigned as Denji's partner. On patrol, Power, thirsting for blood, kills a Sea Cucumber Devil. Denji and Power agree that if he helps rescue her pet cat Meowy from a Bat Devil, she will let him touch her breasts; however, she betrays Denji and feeds his blood to the Bat Devil instead. After the Bat Devil swallows both Meowy and Power, an incensed Denji catches it and fights as Chainsaw Man.
2	Chainsaw vs. Bat; Chensō VS Kōmori (チェンソーVSコウモリ)	May 2, 2019; 978-4-08-881831-3	December 1, 2020; 978-1-9747-0994-6
8. "Chainsaw vs. Bat" (チェンソーVSコウモリ, Chensō VS Kōmori); 9. "Rescue" (救出, Kyūshutsu); 10. "Kon" (コン); 11. "Compromise" (妥協, Dakyō); 12. "Squeeze" (揉む, Momu); 13. "Gun Devil" (銃の悪魔, Jū no Akuma); 14. "French Kiss" (エロキス, Ero Kisu); 15. "Endless 8th Floor" (エンドレス8階, Endoresu Hachi-kai); 16. "First Taste" (はじめての味, Hajimete no Aji)
After defeating the Bat Devil and retrieving Power and Meowy from its guts, Denji's celebration is cut short by the Leech Devil. He is saved by Aki, who defeats the Leech Devil with the power gained from a contract with the Fox Devil. Power moves in with Denji and Aki, but her chaotic ways engender resentment until she offers to uphold her end of the bargain with Denji. After realizing his dream, Denji is disappointed and Makima suggests physical intimacy would be more profound after making an emotional connection; after they engage in heavy petting, he agrees to help her defeat the Gun Devil. 13 years ago, the Gun Devil killed 1.2 million people worldwide, including Aki's family, then disappeared; since then, the only clues to its location have been small pieces of the Gun Devil's body, which strengthen other devils when ingested. Aki, Denji, and Power team up with another Devil Hunter team (Arai and Kobeni, led by Himeno) to investigate a Devil at the Hotel Morin. After Himeno and Power defeat a small Devil, the six are trapped in time on the eighth floor, cut off from the rest of the world by a mysterious Devil, who offers a contract: the rest may leave if they give up Denji's heart. Arai and Kobeni, mentally fragile from confinement, urge acceptance, but Himeno and Aki decline. In flashbacks, Himeno was assigned as Aki's mentor, explaining their bonds and similar habits.
3	Kill Denji; Denji o Korose (デンジを殺せ)	August 2, 2019; 978-4-08-882016-3	February 2, 2021; 978-1-9747-0995-3
17. "Kill Denji" (デンジを殺せ, Denji o Korose); 18. "Chainsaw vs. Eternity" (チェンソーVS永遠, Chensō VS Eien); 19. "Nobel Prize" (ノーベル賞, Nōberu-shō); 20. "Drinking" (飲み, Nomi); 21. "Taste of a Kiss" (キスのお味, Kisu no Oaji); 22. "Cola-Flavor Chupa Chups" (チュッパチャプス コーラ味, Chuppa Chapusu Kōra Aji); 23. "Gunfire" (銃声, Jūsei); 24. "Curse" (呪い, Noroi); 25. "Ghost, Snake, Chainsaw" (ゴースト・ヘビ・チェンソー, Gōsuto Hebi Chensō)
The Eternity Devil reveals its name and powers: it has trapped them within its stomach and grows stronger with fear. Although its heart is inaccessible, Denji learns its belly still feels pain; he decides to torment it until it wants to die, and fights for three straight days, winning their freedom. To celebrate, Public Safety Special Division 4 (D4) holds a welcome party for all the new members, including Denji, Power, Arai, and Kobeni. During the party, a drunken Himeno gives Denji his first kiss and inadvertent trauma; they spend the night at her apartment. The next morning, she proposes to help him win Makima's love if he helps her with Aki. Meanwhile, on the bullet train to Kyoto, Makima is apparently assassinated; the other members of D4 are ambushed by humans who have allied with the Gun Devil. An unidentified colleague, who claims to be the grandson of the yakuza boss killed by Denji, transforms into the Katana Man and attacks Aki. As he struggles with Katana Man, Himeno sacrifices herself entirely to her contracted Ghost Devil; they gain the upper hand briefly before a girl arrives, controlling a monstrous Snake Devil which swallows the Ghost Devil. As its last act, a disembodied hand pulls the starter on Denji's chest and he rises as Chainsaw Man.
4	The Gun is Mightier; Jū wa Tsuyoshi (銃は強し)	October 4, 2019; 978-4-08-882075-0	April 6, 2021; 978-1-9747-1727-9
26. "The Gun is Mightier" (銃は強し, Jū wa Tsuyoshi); 27. "From Kyoto" (京都より, Kyōto Yori); 28. "Secrets & Lies" (秘密と嘘, Himitsu to Uso); 29. "Perfect Score" (100点満点, 100-ten Manten); 30. "Bruised & Battered" (もっとボロボロ, Motto Boroboro); 31. "The Future Rules" (未来最高, Mirai Saikō); 32. "Over and Over Again" (繰り返し繰り返し, Kurikaeshi Kurikaeshi); 33. "Mission Start" (作戦開始, Sakusen Kaishi); 34. "Full Team" (全員集合, Zen'in Shūgō)
The snake girl, Sawatari, reports they have engaged Chainsaw Man and calls for backup. Katana Man overpowers Chainsaw Man and drags his torso away. On the Shinkansen, despite being shot through the head, Makima arises and kills her would-be assassins; arriving in Kyoto, she meets Kurose and Tendo, who report the other ambushes. From a shrine, Makima remotely kills many of those who took Chainsaw Man. Kobeni, who survived when Arai shielded her, arrives and displays remarkable agility in defeating Katana Man and Sawatari, who flee. Makima is debriefed by Madoka, who resigns after reporting the remaining Special Division members have been merged into D4 under Makima. Aki awakens in hospital, briefly mourning Himeno before Kurose and Tendo arrive to help him contract with the Future Devil. Makima assigns Kishibe, an old Devil Hunter who trained Himeno, to Denji and Power; he kills them, then revives them with blood, vowing to repeat this training until they are stronger. After a few days, Makima meets with the yakuza patriarch, who disavows Sawatari's actions; Makima gives him a bag of eyes extracted from close family members of the yakuza to ensure their cooperation. Kishibe leads the new D4 into combat with Sawatari and Katana Man, who are hiding in a skyscraper; D4 is mostly non-human, including the Shark Fiend, Violence Fiend, Spider Devil, and Angel Devil. When Aki confronts Sawatari, she has the snake spit out the Ghost Devil and orders it to kill him.
5	Minor; Miseinen (未成年)	January 4, 2020; 978-4-08-882171-9	June 1, 2021; 978-1-9747-1922-8
35. "Minor" (末成年, Miseinen); 36. "Katana vs. Chainsaw" (日本刀VSチェンソー, Nihontō VS Chensō); 37. "Train, Head, Chainsaw" (電車・頭・チェンソー, Densha Atama Chensō); 38. "Easy Revenge!" (気楽に復讐を!, Kiraku ni Fukushū o!); 39. "Tearjerker" (きっと泣く, Kitto Naku); 40. "Love, Flower, Chainsaw" (恋・花・チェンソー, Koi Hana Chensō); 41. "Before the Storm" (嵐の前, Arashi no Mae); 42. "Teach Me How to Swim" (泳ぎ方を教えて, Oyogikata o Oshiete); 43. "Jane Fell Asleep in the Church" (ジェーンは教会で眠った, Jēn wa Kyōkai de Nemutta)
As Aki kills the Ghost Devil, Kobeni takes Sawatari with a knife, but Sawatari is killed by the snake before she can confirm she had entered a contract with the Gun Devil. Power attacks the zombies in the basement and Denji rides the elevator up, fighting Katana Man upon arrival; after falling into a passenger train together, Chainsaw Man splits Katana Man in half despite losing both arms. After restoring Katana Man to human form and binding him, Denji and Aki beat him in revenge for Himeno. That night, Denji dreams of a sealed door, and Pochita warns him against opening it. Beam, the Shark Fiend, serves as Denji's temporary partner while Power is taken away to drain some blood. Makima and Denji go on a date, and she reassures him he has a human heart. Aki is partnered with the Angel Devil. On patrol, Denji meets a waitress, Reze, while waiting for the rain to stop. After a week of lunches together, Reze proposes that Denji sneak into her high school at night, and they go skinny dipping in the pool. A vicious human who has a contract with the Typhoon Devil attempts to kidnap Reze to pressure Denji, but she kills him and summons the Typhoon Devil while speaking Russian. After watching festival fireworks, Reze invites Denji to run away with her.
6	Boom Boom Boom; Ban Ban Ban (バン バン バン)	March 4, 2020; 978-4-08-882224-2	August 3, 2021; 978-1-9747-2071-2
44. "BOOM BOOM BOOM" (バン バン バン, Ban Ban Ban); 45. "A Fine Day for Explosions" (爆発日和, Bakuhatsu Biyori); 46. "Massacre Melody" (皆殺しのメロディ, Minagoroshi no Merodi); 47. "Luck with Women" (女運, Onna Un); 48. "KABOOM KABOOM KABOOM" (ボンボンボン, Bon Bon Bon); 49. "Shark Hurricane" (サメハリケーン, Same Harikēn); 50. "Sharknado" (シャークネード, Shākunēdo); 51. "Dark Diving" (ダークダイビング, Dāku Daibingu); 52. "Lost Love, Flower, Chainsaw" (失恋・花・チェンソー, Shitsuren Hana Chensō)
Seeing Denji hesitate, Reze kisses him and shocks him by biting off the tip of his tongue, then cuts off his hand as he tries to pull the starter. He is spirited away by Beam, who recognizes her as the Bomb Woman, a Devil-human hybrid who grew up in the Soviet Union. She subdues Beam, but after being distracted by three civilian Devil Hunters, he completes his escape, meeting Aki, who is visiting friends in Division 2 with the Angel Devil. The Bomb Woman is delayed briefly by D2, catching Aki as he is driving away, but the Violence Fiend buys additional time before he runs. A revived Chainsaw Man leaps from the car to battle Bomb Woman, but her skill overwhelms him. As she walks away with his torso, Aki frees him by cutting off her arm and the Angel Devil feeds him blood; Aki and the Violence Fiend battle Bomb Woman and the Typhoon Devil. Typhoon nearly blows away Angel, but he is saved by Aki. Chainsaw Man commands Beam to go full shark and rides him into the fight. After Chainsaw Man defeats Typhoon, Bomb defeats Beam; they reach a stalemate when he wraps chains around her and him and fall into the sea together. When Reze awakens, they have washed up on a beach, and Denji proposes they run away together, but she breaks his neck and walks away. Hours later, Makima and the Angel Devil catch up to and kill her just as she is approaching the cafe, and Denji is tracked down by Power after waiting in vain for Reze inside.
7	In a Dream; Yume no Naka (夢の中)	June 4, 2020; 978-4-08-882328-7	October 5, 2021; 978-1-9747-2096-5
53. "In a Dream" (夢の中, Yume no Naka); 54. "To Go to Enoshima" (江の島にいくには, Enoshima ni Iku ni wa); 55. "Let's Go" (レッツゴー, Rettsu Gō); 56. "A Curse and a First" (呪いと初めて, Noroi to Hajimete); 57. "Suddenly" (突然, Totsuzen); 58. "Yutaro Kurose" (黒瀬ユウタロウ, Kurose Yūtarō); 59. "Mess" (めちゃくちゃ, Mechakucha); 60. "Quanxi and the Fiends' 49-Person Massacre" (クァンシと魔人達四十九人斬り, Kwanshi to Majin-tachi Yonjūkyūnin-giri); 61. "News Reporter" (ニュースレポーター, Nyūsu Repōtā)
Makima's plans to take D4 on a trip to Enoshima are derailed by the publicity around Chainsaw Man; she warns Denji that international assassins will be coming for him, including three brothers who have a contract with the Skin Devil (from America), Tolka and his master (Siberia), Quanxi and her four female fiend partners (China), and Santa Claus (Germany). Angel tells Aki that after Devils die in the human world, they revive in Hell if their name is still feared, and when they die in Hell, they return to the human world; the last sound they all remember before dying in Hell is Chainsaw Man's motor. Makima assigns bodyguards to Denji: Kusakabe, Tamaoki, and Yoshida from D2 and Subaru, Kurose, and Tendo from Kyoto. The American brothers ambush and kill the Kyoto team, assuming their identities; Tolka's master pricks Denji three times with a curse nail. Denji realizes he is being used as bait. The false Kurose attempts to get closer to Denji, but is killed accidentally by Power, who hits him while driving Kobeni's Fiat 500. Santa Claus, who has a contract with the Doll Devil, sends an army of converted human dolls after Denji; as Public Safety officers defend, Quanxi and her fiends join the assault, taking out dolls and officers indiscriminately. Kishibe sits down to parlay with Quanxi, asking if she will help him kill Makima.
8	Super Mess; Chō Mechakucha (ちょうめちゃくちゃ)	August 4, 2020; 978-4-08-882376-8	December 7, 2021; 978-1-9747-2278-5
62. "Super Mess" (ちょうめちゃくちゃ, Chō Mechakucha); 63. "Trip to Hell" (地獄旅行, Jigoku Ryokō); 64. "Welcome to Hell" (ウェルカムトゥーザヘル, Werukamu tū za Heru); 65. "The Darkness Devil" (闇の悪魔, Yami no Akuma); 66. "Woof!" (ワン！, Wan!); 67. "The First Devil Hunter" (最初のデビルハンター, Saisho no Debiru Hantā); 68. "Dark Power" (ダークパワー, Dāku Pawā); 69. "Shining Power" (シャイニングパワー, Shainingu Pawā); 70. "Pinch" (摘む, Tsumu)
Quanxi throws Kishibe and one of the American brothers out the window. Yoshida has a rematch with Quanxi which ends in his defenestration; as Beam flees with Denji, he steps on the curse nail and is killed by a Devil. After Tolka knocks out Beam, his master arrives and reveals she is Santa Claus; the elderly German man previously acting as Santa Claus is a doll she sacrifices to the Hell Devil to send Quanxi, Public Safety, and Tolka to Hell, where the Darkness Devil arrives, taking everyone's arms; all are powerless before it. A small piece of Darkness is fed to Santa Claus to give her the power to kill Makima. The Spider Devil calls Makima to Hell and battle Darkness; she sacrifices Tolka to escape Hell and revives Chainsaw Man to fight Santa Claus. Quanxi transforms into the Crossbow Woman hybrid and teams up with Chainsaw Man; Santa Claus calls her the first Devil Hunter. As the day ends, Santa Claus gets stronger in the dark, turning two of Quanxi's girlfiends into dolls. Chainsaw Man douses himself with gasoline and, ablaze, gains the upper hand on Santa Claus. After Santa Claus is weakened, the Cosmos Fiend traps her in a library and breaks her mind. Quanxi surrenders to Makima, who kills her and the two remaining fiends.
9	Bath; Ofuro (お風呂)	November 4, 2020; 978-4-08-882470-3	February 1, 2022; 978-1-9747-2404-8
71. "Bath" (お風呂, Ofuro); 72. "All Together" (みんな一緒, Minna Issho); 73. "Everyday Life No More" (日常の終わりに, Nichijō no Owari ni); 74. "What the Waves Say" (波の言う事, Nami no Iu Koto); 75. "9.12"; 76. "Don't Open It" (開けちゃダメ, Akecha Dame); 77. "Ring Ring Ring" (チャイムチャイムチャイム, Chaimu Chaimu Chaimu); 78. "Snowball Fight" (ゆきがっせん, Yuki Gassen); 79. "Play Catch" (キャッチボール, Kyatchi Bōru)
Power has developed a fear of the dark; Makima invites Denji on a trip to Enoshima, but he declines. Instead, Denji, Power, and Aki visit the Hayakawa family grave in Hokkaido. Aki asks Kishibe if they may avoid the upcoming fight with the Gun Devil, as he does not want to see them die. Makima forces the trio to participate; she reveals the Gun Devil has been captured and divided among the major powers, and the fight will be to obtain a larger portion for Japan. The Future Devil shows Aki the near future: both he and Power will be killed by Denji; he meets with Makima and begs for more strength through another Devil contract. She proposes herself; as Angel remembers she convinced him to demonstrate his life-draining power on the village that had sheltered him, Aki accepts, and Angel's desperate attempt to kill Makima fails. Makima is the Control Devil, and to stop her, the President of the United States offers one year of lifespan from each citizen to the Gun Devil, but the Gun Devil's assault fails and he escapes by taking a human as the Gun Fiend; Makima calls Denji, cautioning him not to open the door to the Gun Fiend. Power is confused, as the scent at the door is Aki. When Denji opens the door, Aki/Gun Fiend attacks. As the Gun Fiend prevails, in his mind, he is having a playful snowball fight with Denji; ordinary citizens revive Chainsaw Man with their blood and he is forced to kill Aki.
10	A Dog's Feeling; Inu no Kimochi (犬の気持ち)	January 4, 2021; 978-4-08-882527-4	April 5, 2022; 978-1-9747-2535-9
80. "A Dog's Feeling" (犬の気持ち, Inu no Kimochi); 81. "Give Paw" (おてて, Otete); 82. "Always Eat a Hearty Breakfast" (朝食はしっかり, Chōshoku wa Shikkari); 83. "Death, Resurrection, Chainsaw" (死・復活・チェンソー, Shi Fukkatsu Chensō); 84. "Hero of Hell" (地獄のヒーロー, Jigoku no Hīrō); 85. "Bloody Good Gut Feeling" (超跳腸・胃胃肝血, Chō Chō Chō Ii Kanji); 86. "Date Chainsaw" (デートチェンソー, Dēto Chensō); 87. "Chainsaw Man vs. the Horrifying Weapon Humans" (チェンソーマン VS 恐怖の武器人間, Chensō Man Bāsasu Kyōfu no Buki Ningen); 88. "Star Chainsaw" (スターチェンソー, Sutā Chensō)
Aki leaves Denji an inheritance, which he uses to rent an apartment for himself and Power, but he remains depressed about killing Aki. Makima takes him to her apartment, where he wishes to become her dog to avoid hard choices in the future. She calls Power over and as Denji opens the door, Makima fatally shoots her. Makima explains how she broke Pochita's contract: first she gave him happiness, including a family and regular meals, then took it all away. She guessed the truth behind the locked door in his mind: he killed his abusive father as a child in self-defense. In the morning, Kishibe ambushes her, summoning the Hell Devil to bind Makima; however, Pochita, having taken over Denji's body goes to Hell in her stead. She explains why she is a fan: the names of the Devils he eats are erased, making him the Devil that Devils fear. Makima is one of the four "Horsemen" of the Apocalypse, which includes the Control, War, Hunger/Famine, and Death Devils. Upon his return, Pochita slices up Makima and leaves to have a hamburger at Family Burger, where Kobeni is working after leaving Public Safety. A comedy of errors ends with their date together; afterwards, Makima arrives with several weapon humans, including Katana Man, Reze, and Quanxi, promising a date to the one who can defeat Pochita. Their attacks are futile and Makima sends him flying out of the atmosphere, but he returns by removing his heart and throwing it back to Earth, where he traps all his foes in chains.
11	Go Get 'Em, Chainsaw Man; Ganbare Chensō Man (がんばれチェンソーマン)	March 4, 2021; 978-4-08-882576-2	June 7, 2022; 978-1-9747-2711-7
89. "Go Get 'Em, Chainsaw Man" (がんばれチェンソーマン, Ganbare Chensō Man); 90. "Super Power" (超パワー, Chō Pawā); 91. "Power, Power, Power" (パワー・パワー・パワー, Pawā Pawā Pawā); 92. "Vanilla Sky" (バニラスカイ, Banira Sukai); 93. "You & Crappy Movies" (君と糞映画, Kimi to Kuso Eiga); 94. "Chainsaw Man vs. the Weapon Humans" (チェンソーマン 対 武器人間ズ, Chensō Man Tai Buki Ningenzu); 95. "Chainsaw Man vs. Control Devil" (チェンソーマン VS 支配の悪魔, Chensō Man VS Shihai no Akuma); 96. "This Kind of Taste" (こんな味, Konna Aji); 97. "I, Love, Chainsaw" (愛・ラブ・チェンソー, Ai Rabu Chensō)
As the world praises Pochita for defeating the Gun Devil, Makima declares her contempt for humans and he takes a deadly spear she threw at Kobeni. Inside him, Power revives by eating Pochita and escapes with Denji's body; in a dumpster, Power exchanges her remaining life as a contract for Denji to find the Blood Devil and befriend it, and he awakens. Together, Denji and Kishibe plot how to permanently kill Makima. She confronts Chainsaw Man in a graveyard, backed by an army including the weapon humans; although he defeats them, he is exhausted and Makima revives him with her own blood so they can engage in solo combat. She prevails, ripping Pochita from his chest, but hidden in the bodies, Denji rises and slashes her with a chainsaw made with Power's blood, slowing her regeneration; the Chainsaw Man she had fought was a shadow ripped from Pochita. Afterward, Denji becomes one with Makima by cooking and physically consuming her flesh over the next few weeks, which he calls an act of love. Reporting to Kishibe after the macabre meals are complete, Denji has adopted Makima's dogs and takes in the reincarnated Control Devil, a young girl named Nayuta. Pochita appears to Denji in a dream, telling him that Control's dream was to form equal relationships with others, advising him to hug Nayuta as much as possible to make it come true.
12	Bird and War; Tori to Sensō (鳥と戦争)	October 4, 2022; 978-4-08-883271-5	October 3, 2023; 978-1-9747-4058-1
98. "Bird and War" (鳥と戦争, Tori to Sensō); 99. "Two Birds" (2羽, Ni-wa); 100. "How to Walk Shoeless" (裸足の歩き方, Hadashi no Arukikata); 101. "Afterschool Devil Hunters" (放課後デビルハンター, Hōkago Debiru Hantā); 102. "Save the Cat" (セーブザキャット, Sēbu za Kyatto); 103. "Denji Dream" (デンジドリーム, Denji Dorīmu)
After high school outcast Asa Mitaka trips, smashing the Chicken Devil the class is keeping as a pet, the class president, who has entered a contract with the Justice Devil, kills her. Asa sacrifices herself to the War Devil and kills the president and her teacher in revenge; the next day, the War Devil, named Yoru, explains it left half the brain to her so they can blend in and investigate her school, as Yoru believes Chainsaw Man is a student. When Yoru takes over Asa's body, scars appear on Asa's face. Since Yoru can make possessions into weapons, she asks a new student, Yoshida, to be her boyfriend, but he declines. Hearing a rumor that Chainsaw Man is in the Devil Hunter Club, Yoru forces Asa to join, alongside the orphan Yuko and Yoshida. She becomes friends with Yuko and Yoru suggests killing Yuko for a weapon; however, while patrolling together, Yuko is injured and Asa saves her. They are pursued and swallowed by a Bat Devil, but rescued almost immediately by Chainsaw Man, who soon defeats the Cockroach Devil which burst out of the Bat. Yoshida, a former Public Safety officer, tells Denji he has been assigned to the school to ensure his identity as Chainsaw Man remains secret; on the other hand, Denji believes women will pursue him if everyone knows.
13	Spoiler; Netabare (ネタバレ)	January 4, 2023; 978-4-08-883316-3	December 5, 2023; 978-1-9747-4102-1
104. "Spoiler" (ネタバレ, Netabare); 105. "Red Hot" (灼熱, Shakunetsu); 106. "Bonfire" (焚火, Takibi); 107. "School Attacker" (学校の襲撃者, Gakkō no Shūgekisha); 108. "Something Important to Asa" (アサの大切なもの, Asa no Taisetsu na Mono); 109. "The Easy Way to Stop Bullying" (簡単なイジメのなくしかた, Kantan na Ijime no Nakushi Kata); 110. "A Ring in the Night" (夜のチャイム, Yoru no Chaimu); 111. "Aha Ha Ha Ha" (アハハハハ); 112. "Between Cat and Criminal" (猫と犯罪者の間, Neko to Hanzaisha no Aida)
Yoshida tries to set up Denji with Asa; to impress her, he claims to be Chainsaw Man but she doubts his confession and rejects him. A recuperating Yuko confides to Asa that she killed her neighbor to enter a contract with the Justice Devil, giving her the power to read minds, to take revenge on Asa's bullies tomorrow. Yoru tries to stop the Justice Woman hybrid and fails; reverting to Asa, she makes a sword out of her school uniform and dices up Justice. A mysterious student who calls herself Asa's older sister revives Justice, who then is stopped by Chainsaw Man. As Yoru attempts to kill him, he tries to unmask himself as Denji to a surviving student, but is whisked away by Yoshida's octopus. That night, Yuko shows up to Asa's apartment to say goodbye; as everyone sleeps, she is killed by an imposter posing as Chainsaw Man. The Devil Hunter Club welcomes Asa; club president Haruka Iseumi shows off a starter on his chest, convincing Yoru they have found Chainsaw Man. Asa looks for a suitable human to turn into a weapon; she decides on Denji after watching him sell handrolled cigarettes from discards to the homeless and asks him on a date.
14	I Wanna See Penguins! Pengin ga Mitai! (ペンギンが見たい！)	April 4, 2023; 978-4-08-883464-1	February 6, 2024; 978-1-9747-4358-2
113. "I Wanna See Penguins!" (ペンギンが見たい！, Pengin ga Mitai!); 114. "Endless Aquarium" (エンドレス水族館, Endoresu Suizokukan); 115. "High Schoolers These Days" (今時の高校生, Imadoki no Kōkōsei); 116. "Taste of Starfish" (ヒトデの味, Hitode no Aji); 117. "Penguin and Weapon" (ペンギンと武器, Pengin to Buki); 118. "Saying Goodbye" (別れの挨拶, Wakare no Aisatsu); 119. "Thief" (泥棒, Dorobō); 120. "Triangle" (トライアングル, Toraianguru); 121. "Theory of Happiness" (幸福論, Kōfukuron); 122. "The Prophecies" (大予言, Daiyogen)
On their date at the aquarium, Asa bores Denji, who wanders off to find the penguins; the mysterious student reappears and reveals herself as Fami, the Famine Devil, trapping them until Asa turns Denji into a weapon. Denji believes the Eternity Devil has returned; they soon encounter and team up with the Devil Hunter Club. After three days, Asa confesses her weapon plans to Denji; over a shared meal of starfish, he says he is saving money to send Nayuta to college. Asa devises an escape plan and they collect a million yen together, which she uses to purchase the aquarium. Turning the possession into a spear, she kills the Eternity Devil. Denji asks for another date; realizing Asa feels affection for him, Yoru tries to turn him into a sword but fails, which she blames on unrequited feelings. For their second date, they watch a movie at Denji's apartment. Yoru breaks one of his rules as Nayuta returns with the dogs; for getting spit on Denji, her property, Nayuta turns Yoru's mind into a dog's. To return her to human, Denji agrees not to get friendly with Asa, whose memories are modified to believe Denji stood her up instead; as she waits by the school, Yoshida meets Asa and asks her to stay away from Denji. Depressed, Yoru is walking back when she sees a powerful Devil inducing the residents of an apartment building to leap to their deaths; Fami describes it as the first of the Devils that will usher in mass terror.
15	Hors D'oeuvre; Zensai (前菜)	August 4, 2023; 978-4-08-883598-3	May 7, 2024; 978-1-9747-4640-8
123. "Hors D'oeuvre" (前菜, Zensai); 124. "Soup" (スープ, Sūpu); 125. "Apple Thief" (林檎万引き犯, Ringo Manbiki-han); 126. "Food Fight" (ぐちゃぐちゃファイト, Guchagucha Faito); 127. "Save the Asa" (セーブザアサ, Sēbu za Asa); 128. "Main Dish" (メインディッシュ, Mein Disshu); 129. "Save Me, Chainsaw Man" (助けてチェンソーマン, Tasukete Chensō Man); 130. "Kill Building" (斬るビル, Kiru Biru); 131. "Taste of Crap" (糞の味, Kuso no Aji); 132. "Protection" (保護, Hogo); 133. "Chainsaw Man Protest" (チェンソーマンデモ, Chensō Man Demo)
The Falling Devil can overcome gravity: the lower a person's spirits, the higher they fall; it is trying to feed the diner, a caterpillar-like Devil, and Asa/Yoru is the main course. Yoru saves Asa from her negative thoughts, but Asa pushes her out again, fearing both companionship and solitude. When Chainsaw Man arrives, Falling Devil tries to use his trauma in vain. Asa gives up and lets go, but Chainsaw Man catches Asa and reveals his strategy to overcome trauma: maintain an overarching purpose (in his case, sex). Disgusted, she says no partner would choose him, and they plummet onto a giant plate in Hell. Before the diner can eat them, the imposter Chainsaw Man appears and helps them escape from Hell. Chainsaw Man is revived with Asa's blood; the diner swallows them, but then immediately vomits and the insulted Falling Devil kills the diner. Fami returns the Falling Devil to Hell, as the diner was intended to serve as Yoru's tomb. Haruka publicizes the Chainsaw Man Church for World Peace. After falling asleep in school, Denji wakes up, bound; Yoshida warns him both Nayuta and Asa are hostages to prevent him from turning into Chainsaw Man again.
16	Ordinary Happiness; Futsū no Shiawase (普通の幸せ)	December 4, 2023; 978-4-08-883701-7	September 3, 2024; 978-1-9747-4874-7
134. "Ordinary Happiness" (普通の幸せ, Futsū no Shiawase); 135. "Sentimental Drive" (センチメンタルドライブ, Senchimentaru Doraibu); 136. "Normal Life" (普通の日々, Futsū no Hibi); 137. "Chu Chu Lovely Muni Muni Mura Mura" (チューチューラブリームニムニムラムラ, Chū Chū Raburī Muni Muni Mura Mura); 138. "Sword Man" (ソードマン, Sōdo Man); 139. "A Chair's Feelings" (イスの気持ち, Isu no Kimochi); 140. "Scales" (天秤, Tenbin); 141. "Normal Life Plus" (普通の人生プラス, Futsū no Jinsei Purasu); 142. "Denji Fan Club" (デンジファンクラブ, Denji Fan Kurabu); 143. "Rawr" (がおー, Gaō)
A Church representative claiming to be Chainsaw Man is viewed skeptically by Denji and Asa. Asa realizes her affection is in conflict with Yoru's renewed desire to kill Chainsaw Man. Fami plans to help both: if Asa joins the Church and fights, other Devils will lose their fear of Chainsaw Man, effectively killing him; also, Fami notes Yoru's enemy is Black Chainsaw Man, not Red (Denji). Asa wins fame, leaving Denji jealous. He watches a film with Yoshida but the theater is evacuated after a Devil incursion; Yoshida leaves Denji alone with a girl he knows, Fumiko Mifune. She offers sex if he licks the dead Devil; that accomplished, they rent a private karaoke room, where Denji fights off a series of men as she keeps singing; Yoshida introduces Fumiko, revealed to be a Public Safety officer, as Denji's bodyguard. A new student, Miri Sugo, recruits Denji to the Church by mentioning unlimited sex. At the Church, Denji objects to getting married first, then leaves after Barem Bridge, the Church second-in-command, suggests killing Asa. At the amusement park with Nayuta, Fumiko tells Denji how she feels about Chainsaw Man, who did not save her parents. Barem arrives, hinting at an impending massacre, but Quanxi arrives and stops the would-be killers before those Church members could set their plan in motion. The Church is under investigation for terrorist activities.
17	Guns, Nails, Katana; Jū Kugi Katana (銃・釘・刀)	April 4, 2024; 978-4-08-884035-2	January 7, 2025; 978-1-9747-5269-0
144. "Guns, Nails, Katana" (銃・釘・刀, Jū Kugi Katana); 145. "Kumbaya" (クンバヤ, Kunbaya); 146. "Chainsaw Man War" (チェンソーマン戦争, Chensō Man Sensō); 147. "Cremation" (火葬, Kasō); 148. "Room 606 Sword" (606号室剣, 606-gōshitsu Ken); 149. "Devil's Choice" (悪魔の選択, Akuma no Sentaku); 150. "Dream's Next Stage" (夢の次, Yume no Tsugi); 151. "The Return of Chainsaw Man" (帰ってきたチェンソーマン, Kaettekita Chensō Man); 152. "Massage" (マッサージ, Massāji); 153. "Chainsaw Man Hunters" (チェンソーマンハンター, Chensō Man Hantā)
Nail and Katana Man enter the Church, where they kill the founder, who had a contract with the Justice Devil. However, Public Safety realizes the Justice Devil was the diner who was killed by the Falling Devil; Barem reveals the Church made contracts with the Fire Devil instead, and 350,000 Church contractors turn to Fire Devils, sprouting chainsaws spontaneously. Nayuta realizes that Fami intends to strengthen Chainsaw Man and Yoru to fight the Death Devil, who is coming in six months. Barem incites the crowd of Fire Devils to attack Nayuta, but Quanxi rescues her, Denji, and Fumiko. Yoshida arrives to arrest Asa; as she turns her apartment into a sword, he severs her right arm and tries to grab her with a tentacle, but she escapes and Yoru exults as the world remembers War. Nayuta and Denji separate from Fumiko and return home for the dogs and Meowy, but Barem sets the apartment on fire. Denji pulls his starter and Chainsaw Man defeats the weapon humans belonging to the Church (Sword, Spear, and Whip), but is trapped by the remaining humans over the objections of Fumiko and Nayuta, who gives him a chance at escaping.
18	All Pets; Minna Petto (みんなペット)	August 2, 2024; 978-4-08-884155-7	May 6, 2025; 978-1-9747-5493-9
154. "All Pets" (みんなペット, Minna Petto); 155. "The Old Me" (前の私, Mae no Watashi); 156. "Whup Whup Whup Whup Bzzz Split Split" (ババババヴヴヴヴバラバラ, Ba Ba Ba Ba Vu Vu Vu Vu Barabara); 157. "College Fund" (進学資金, Shingaku Shikin); 158. "Gyohnee Guillotine" (ギョニーギロチン, Gyonī Girochin); 159. "Attack on Samurai" (アタックオンサムライ, Atakku on Samurai); 160. "That for Which the Heart Beats" (心臓の動く向き, Shinzō no Ugoku Muki); 161. "Chainsaw Man Puzzle" (チェンソーマンパズル, Chensō Man Pazuru); 162. "Fearsome" (恐ろしい奴, Osoroshii Yatsu); 163. "Dream Balls" (夢のタマキン, Yume no Tamakin); 164. "Charred Remains" (焼け跡, Yakeato)
Barem continues to incite the crowd against Nayuta; her vague memories of Makima tell her to again fill Denji with happiness, then take it away. Denji wakes up in a hospital bed; Yoshida says he was warned against turning into Chainsaw Man and doctors begin to dismember him at the Tokyo Devil Detention Center. Asa and Fami arrive and break into the facility; Fami summons the Guillotine Devil for help and they inadvertently liberate the other members of the school Devil Hunter Club, who begin following them in the hope of meeting Chainsaw Man. Nail and Katana Man fight Fami and Asa, but when Asa realizes Katana also has a grudge against Chainsaw Man, they join forces. After they arrive at the surgical theater, they reassemble the pieces of Chainsaw Man; finding his head, Asa finally realizes Denji is Chainsaw Man. Quanxi arrives; Public Safety has been extorting her help by holding her girlfriends hostage, but once the officer directing her is killed by an escaped Fire Devil, Yoru kills Quanxi. The allies escape to Fami's apartment, where Denji sleeps for a week, rudely awakened by those who want to fight him. Denji searches fruitlessly for Nayuta at the apartment, confused by conflicting signals from Yoru and Asa. Fami suggests he might be hungry, and he asks for sushi.
19	Everyday Scenery; Itsumo no Fūkei (いつもの風景)	December 4, 2024; 978-4-08-884313-1	October 7, 2025; 978-1-9747-5854-8
165. "Everyday Scenery" (いつもの風景, Itsumo no Fūkei); 166. "Rain, Brothel, Removal" (雨・ソープ・切断, Ame Sōpu Setsudan); 167. "Super Smooch" (超チュー, Chō Chū); 168. "Kiss, Love, Sperm" (キス・好き・スペルマ, Kisu Suki Superuma); 169. "Hands and Adaptation" (手と適応, Te to Tekiō); 170. "How to Eat Sushi" (寿司の食べ方, Sushi no Tabekata); 171. "Special Division 5" (特異5課, Tokui Goka); 172. "Bzzz! Boom! Chomp!" (ヴヴン！ドオン！ガブ！, Vuvun! Dōn! Gabu!); 173. "Hard of Hearing" (少し聞こえてる, Sukoshi Kikoeteru); 174. "Ayyy, Aging" (おーい老い, Ōi Oi); 175. "Both Hands" (両の手, Ryō no Te)
Fami explains Denji can void his contract with Pochita to live a normal life by fighting as Chainsaw Man; if the black Chainsaw Man (Pochita) is defeated, Denji could receive a human heart transplant. The human form of Katana Man suggests taking Denji to a soapland he owns, over Asa's objections. After they arrive at the burnt-out soapland, Denji laments his misplaced priorities so Yoru offers to amputate his penis; the two go to a secluded place with a knife, where a brief argument between them turns into a kiss and handjob. Asa and Yoru find their feelings for Denji are blurring together. The team next goes to Death by Sushi, a conveyor belt sushi restaurant, where Barem casually sits next to Denji and offers to release Nayuta if Denji can save them from Public Safety. As Barem says Denji needs to be unhappy and feared to unleash his true power, what appears to be Nayuta's head is served on a plate. Enraged, Denji decapitates Barem and engages the starter; Pochita takes over as the black Chainsaw Man. Public Safety Special Division 5 prove to be no match for Pochita, who eats the Ear Devil, causing ears to disappear worldwide before Yoshida forces Pochita to regurgitate, restoring ears. Fumiko explains to government ministers that ear erasure was an experiment and proposes to have the Aging Devil eaten and eliminated in exchange for the lives of 10,000 children. Before she can relay their approval, Pochita erases mouths, snow, octopi, and bitterness. Katana Man, Yoru, and the Aging Devil attempt but fail to halt Pochita; Yoru loses her left arm.
20	Two Children; Nishi (二子)	April 4, 2025; 978-4-08-884471-8	March 3, 2026; 978-1-9747-6223-1
176. "Two Children" (二子, Nishi); 177. "Trigger Finger" (人差し指, Hitosashiyubi); 178. "Gun Goddess" (銃の女神, Jū no Megami); 179. "Vamvagah" (ヴァンヴァガ, Vanvaga); 180. "Aging's World" (老いの世界, Oi no Sekai); 181. "Trees on the Mind" (気になる木, Ki ni Naru Ki); 182. "Cute" (可愛い顔, Kawaii Kao); 183. "Barf, Head, Perv" (ゲロ・顔・エロ, Gero Kao Ero); 184. "Run, Denji" (走れデンジ, Hashire Denji); 185. "Stomach in Another World" (胃は異世界, I wa Isekai); 186. "Yank, Blorsh, Bdroom" (ギュッ・ボッ・ヴヴン, Gyu Bo Vuvun)
Yoru calls her children, Tank and Gun, to serve as her arms, restoring mouths by striking Pochita. Gathering strength, Yoru takes thousands of index fingers and Pochita is blown to pieces; the Aging Devil offers to help Pochita by inviting it to eat its blood and flesh. Aging then wearily forces the bickering Asa/Yoru to grow up by drawing them into its internal world, where they find a slumbering Denji. A former Devil Hunter tells them there is no escape, unless they transform into a tree, then rot, which takes at least a thousand years. Yoru and Asa discover they cannot use their Devil powers. Blaming Denji, Yoru punches him awake and he wallows in his misery; her annoyed blows turn to kisses. Asa explains Chainsaw Man inspired her to keep living and Denji finds inspiration in grub and girls, recalling the grave visit with Power and Aki. After vomiting up another Devil head, he realizes Pochita's stomach is still in the real world. Denji refuses the Aging Devil's offer and demands another family, running laps around the lake to become hungry. He then hacks into a evolved tree-human using an axe made by Asa and eats its intestines to revive Pochita, who closes in on the Aging Devil; it takes fingernails, livers, and then eyes from the gathered Public Safety agents, mortally wounding them, including Fumiko. The Aging Devil finally succeeds in separating the Pochita heart from Chainsaw Man.
21	Barf! Gerore! (ゲロれ！)	July 4, 2025; 978-4-08-884593-7	June 2, 2026; 978-1-9747-1646-3
187. "Barf!" (ゲロれ！, Gerore!); 188. "Octopus, War, Chainsaw" (蛸・ウォー・チェンソー, Tako Wō Chensō); 189. "Heart Pass, Octopus" (ハートパス・オクトパス, Hāto Pasu Okutopasu); 190. "To Their Respective Worlds" (元の世界へ, Moto no Sekai e); 191. "Cuz I'm a Devil" (だって悪魔だから, Datte Akuma Dakara); 192. "How Devils Play" (悪魔の遊び方, Akuma no Asobikata); 193. "Burning Kiss" (バーニングKISS, Bāningu Kisu); 194. "Fun School Festival" (楽しみ文化祭, Tanoshimi Bunkasai); 195. "Kill Me Tears" (キルミー涙, Kiru Mī Namida); 196. "Chainsaw Man to the Rescue!" (やってきた！チェンソーマン！, Yattekita! Chensō Man!); 197. "3 Seconds" (3秒, San-byō); 198. "It's Fami!" (キガちゃんデス！, Kiga-chan Desu!)
Pochita and the Aging Devil reach a stalemate. Denji uses Pochita to bring Yoshida into the Aging world, but both Yoshida and Yoru fail to make a difference. Denji vomits the Aging Devil into its own world and Yoshida forces it into a contract, returning everyone to their worlds except for the former minister of finance. Afterward, Yoshida says Asa/Yoru must turn Chainsaw Man into a weapon to fight the Death Devil. Instead, Yoru shoots the wall open, escaping with Denji, and proposes to have sex with him if he defeats the Death Devil. Denji tells Pochita that Asa is "the most dangerous chick yet"; Asa points at Denji and asks him to kill her to prevent Yoru's horrific plans, but sex-motivated Denji declares he will beat the Death Devil. Yoshida and Fumiko then ask Fami for help, but she would rather help plan the school festival. A new, awkward female student, apparently the Death Devil, joins the planning group and promises to kill another student to end his suffering. An imposter Chainsaw Man, wearing a fleshy cape and bearing the Justice Devil's heart, stops "Death" and easily cuts her apart; "Death" revives several times and introduces herself as Fami, the Famine Devil. Confused, the imposter Chainsaw Man hesitates, then both are flattened by the Falling Devil and served on a platter to the real Death Devil, who has been posing as "Fami". The real Fami asks Death to die for the sake of humanity, but Death reveals her hollow torso, explaining she cannot die.
22	Enjoy Your Food; Oishiku Tabeyō (おいしく食べよう)	September 4, 2025; 978-4-08-884669-9	October 13, 2026; 978-1-9747-6651-2
199. "Enjoy Your Food" (おいしく食べよう, Oishiku Tabeyō); 200. "Toxic Couple" (有害な二人, Yūgai na Futari); 201. "Terror Looks Like This!" (恐怖ってのはこう！, Kyōfu tte no wa Kō!); 202. "Devil Combination" (悪魔合体, Akuma Gattai); 203. "Human Shield" (人シールド, Hito Shīrudo); 204. "With One Life" (一人の命で, Hitori no Inochi de); 205. "Who?" (誰？, Dare?); 206. "Chest, Woman, Apology" (胸・女・謝罪, Mune Onna Shazai); 207. "Budda Budda Budda Budda!" (バババババババババ！, Bababababababababa!); 208. "Changed My Mind" (やっぱイヤ, Yappa Iya); 209. "Terrifying Weapon" (恐ろしい兵器, Osoroshii Heiki); 210. "Peace" (ピース, Pīsu)
Death enslaves Fami and the fake Chainsaw Man, who are unable to plunge mankind into "an abyss of terror" as commanded, so the Falling Devil helps by turning gravity sideways. Denji and Yoru flirt and fight; eventually Denji battles the fake Chainsaw Man and cuts its heart, revealing the Fire Devil, who imposes a choice: save Yoru, trapped by the Falling Devil, or save humans from falling rubble. Denji rushes in to attack the Falling Devil, but she overpowers him and he falls up into the sky where he is caught by Asa, who regains control and shoots the rubble trapping herself. She urges Denji to think happy thoughts despite his belief he doesn't deserve it, and she vows to make him happy. Yoru uses Tank to bury the Falling Devil under a mound of blades and spears, but the Falling Devil shrugs off the attack and hurls them back at Denji and Asa/Yoru. Yoru tries to turn Denji into a weapon, but is stopped by Asa; after Denji volunteers himself as a sacrificial weapon, Yoru hesitates. After both Yoru and Denji fall, pierced by spears and swords, Yoru vanquishes the Falling Devil after remembering nuclear weapons: the United States has reinvented and dropped fission bombs on the Soviet Union. She declares she loves America, not Denji. As "The Star-Spangled Banner" plays, Asa asks Yoru if she is "really going to do it", but Yoru dismisses her. Denji wakes up in an empty classroom, greeted by the Death Devil, who reintroduces herself as Li'l D.
23	War, Panties, Chainsaw; Sensō Pantsu Chensō (戦争・パンツ・チェンソー)	February 4, 2026; 978-4-08-884778-8	February 2, 2027; 978-1-9747-6969-8
211. "War, Panties, Chainsaw" (戦争・パンツ・チェンソー, Sensō Pantsu Chensō); 212. "Really Good Girl" (すごくいいこ, Sugoku Iiko); 213. "Role" (役割, Yakuwari); 214. "Bff, Creak, Door" (ボオ・ギイ・ドア, Bō Gī Doa); 215. "Declaration of War" (宣戦布告, Sensen Fukoku); 216. "Yearning" (憧れの, Akogare no); 217. "Two Good People" (良い二人, Yoi Futari); 218. "Eat Me" (私を食べて, Watashi o Tabete); 219. "The Bereft" (失った者達, Ushinatta Monotachi); 220. "Bonds and Michigan" (絆とミシガン州, Kizuna to Mishigan-shū); 221. "Safe Battle" (安全バトル, Anzen Batoru); 222. "Denji Man" (デンジーマン, Denjī Man)
Li'l D says if Denji erases death for Yoru, undying humans would be trapped in never-ending war. Denji agrees to help but he was mesmerized by her panties and forgets the plan of action. While pondering Yoru's kiss and Li'l D's panties he is interrupted by Fumiko, who tells him he can live happily with Yoru if he eats the Death Devil instead. She departs, leaving a nude selfie print. Denji concludes he is a "chick magnet" who is about to be tricked. Yoshida visits him next but Barem bombs the school, killing Yoshida. Pochita takes over and the black Chainsaw Man devours Barem and the Flamethrower Devil. The doors to Hell appear above Pochita, Li'l D, and Fami; Yoru descends. Lil'D tries to bargain, but Yoru is fixated on Pochita. They fight fiercely without resolution as she is transferring her wounds to the citizens of California. Meanwhile, a young Denji finds Asa crawling towards her mother: Asa says when she was a child, her mother killed her abusive, cheating father and framed a weak devil; because she also wanted him to die, Asa wonders if she is a bad person. Denji reveals he staged his father's suicide and is a good person; they share a hearty laugh as Yoru and Pochita continue to hack each other to bits. Asa distracts Yoru by blowing her head apart to create an opportunity for Denji to eat her and stop War's plans. Li'l D tells Pochita to eat Yoru, but he responds by beheading Li'l D, Fami, and Guilly, the Guillotine Devil, because Denji realizes neither Yoru or Li'l D offers an ordinary life for him, choosing Asa instead. Yoru tries to turn Death into a sword, but Pochita eats Li'l D's top half, outraging Yoru, who unsuccessfully tries summoning an overwhelming number of devils, swords of Michigan and Oregon, and finally hits Pochita with a nuclear punch powered by Virginians, causing a massive explosion. When Yoru recovers she celebrates watching the humans failing to die, saying her dream has come true. Pochita recovers and Yoru tries to claim him as a weapon, but Denji stops her as he declares victory after showing a V (scissors) to her open hand (paper). Yoru attempts to shoot Denji, but he emerges in a new armored Chainsaw Man form.
24	Ultimate Armor; Saikyō no Yoroi (最強の鎧)	June 4, 2026; 978-4-08-885051-1	—
223. "Ultimate Armor" (最強の鎧, Saikyō no Yoroi); 224. "Moon, Spear, Spear" (月・突き・槍, Tsuki Tsuki Yari); 225. "Barf, Motorcycle, Hell" (ゲロ・バイク・ヘル, Gero Baiku Heru); 226. "Locust's Home" (バッタのおうち, Batta no Ouchi); 227. "The Taste of Shrimp and Blood" (エビと血の味, Ebi to Chi no Aji); 228. "Dove" (鳩, Hato); 229. "Nightjar and Asa" (ヨタカとアサ, Yotaka to Asa); 230. "Sex and Selection" (エッチ&淘汰, Etchi & Tōta); 231. "Goodbye, Pochita" (さよならポチタ, Sayonara Pochita); 232. "Thank You, Chainsaw Man" (ありがとうチェンソーマン, Arigatō Chensō Man)
Yoru demands that red (Denji) Chainsaw Man revert to the black (Pochita) form, but Denji starts to eat Yoru's devil friends, commanding her to return Asa's body. She instead skewers Denji with the American flag from the moon. He erases legs and teeth before Yoru knocks him down with a chainsaw motorcycle, forcing him to regurgitate. He runs away to Hell and Yoru follows, but all the devils there are missing. The Locust Devil skewers Yoru and she cedes control to Asa, who asks Denji for help; he decapitates the devil and eventually eats him with Asa's help. Yoru reasserts control and blows Denji to pieces. As he lies, helpless, she rides a chainsaw motorcycle at him, but swerves at the last second after Denji vomits a dove, because Asa hates killing birds. As Yoru succumbs to her wounds, she confesses she could not comprehend the human concept of guilt. Denji crawls over and feeds Yoru blood, reviving her because she promised to have sex with him if he ate "that dangerous devil". Amused, Yoru feeds Denji blood and calls a temporary truce, but they are eaten by insects: now that Death has been forgotten, Fumikos around the world report that insects and animals are eating humans. Denji wakes up with Pochita sitting on his chest. Pochita says Denji was happier starving in the shack without friends; transforming into the black Chainsaw Man, Pochita hugs Denji one more time and then eats his own heart, erasing Chainsaw Man. The scene cuts back to the shack. Inside, Denji wakes up wishing for only good dreams; again, the yakuza stab him at the warehouse, but this time, Power bursts in and slaughters the devils, claiming Denji as her pet. Control Devil Nayuta drafts the pair into public safety, sending them off to fight a crab-like devil at school. After their victory, Denji saves Asa from crushing Bucky; she thanks Denji and calls him Chainsaw Man because he used a chainsaw during the fight. As they walk away, Power charmingly misdiagnoses Denji's sudden, unfamiliar feelings and demands an extravagant meal.
