= Blood Fiend =

Blood Fiend may refer to:

- Theatre of Death, a 1967 British horror film
- Blood Fiend, a fictional race in the role-playing game Dungeons & Dragons
- Power (Chainsaw Man), a fictional character in the manga series Chainsaw Man
