= Fairouz Ai =

Japanese voice actress

- ファイルーズ あい
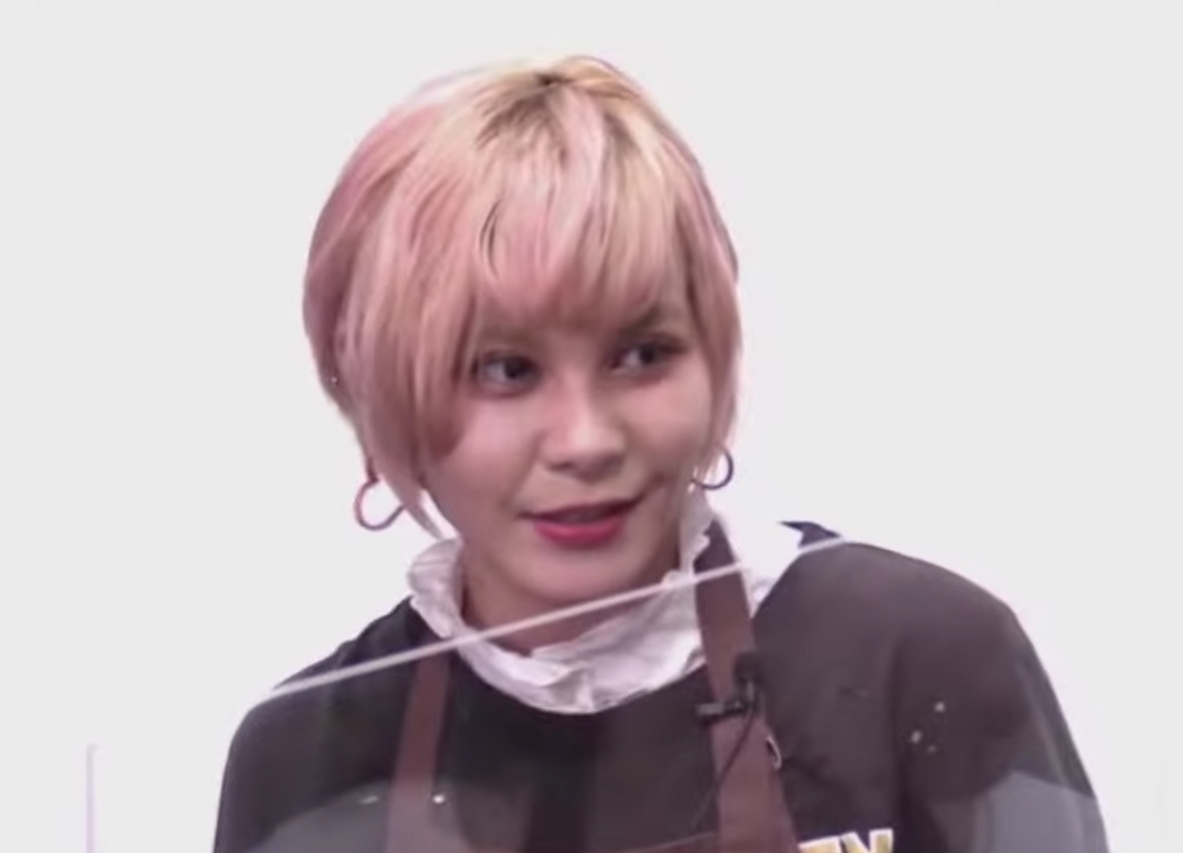
- Fairouz in 2021
- Born: Fairouz Ai Kadota (門田ファイルーズあい, Kadota Fairūzu Ai); 6 July 1993 (age 33); Tokyo, Japan
- Occupation: Voice actress
- Years active: 2018–present
- Agent: Mausu Promotion
- Notable credits: How Heavy Are the Dumbbells You Lift? as Hibiki Sakura; Kandagawa Jet Girls as Emily Orange; If My Favorite Pop Idol Made It to the Budokan, I Would Die as Eripiyo; JoJo's Bizarre Adventure: Stone Ocean as Jolyne Cujoh; Chainsaw Man as Power; Yashahime as Takechiyo; KonoSuba as Cecily; Kiratto Pri☆Chan as Alice Kagayaki; Tropical-Rouge! Precure as Manatsu Natsuumi/Cure Summer; Ghost of Yōtei as Atsu
- Height: 161 cm (5 ft 3 in)

Fairouz Ai Kadota (Japanese: 門田ファイルーズあい, Hepburn: Kadota Fairūzu Ai; born 6 July 1993), known simply as Fairouz Ai, is a Japanese voice actress who is affiliated with Mausu Promotion. She played her first major role as Hibiki Sakura for the anime series How Heavy Are the Dumbbells You Lift?. She also played Alice Kagayaki in Kiratto Pri☆Chan, Manatsu Natsuumi/Cure Summer in Tropical-Rouge! Precure, Emily Orange in Kandagawa Jet Girls, Eripiyo in If My Favorite Pop Idol Made It to the Budokan, I Would Die, Jolyne Cujoh in JoJo's Bizarre Adventure: Stone Ocean, Takechiyo in Yashahime, Delta in The Eminence in Shadow, and Power in Chainsaw Man.

== Biography ==
Fairouz Ai Kadota was born on 6 July 1993 in Tokyo to a Japanese mother and an Egyptian father. She was named after the Lebanese singer Fairuz. She spent a few years of her elementary education at Cairo Japanese School before returning to Japan. During her junior high school years, she became familiar with the manga series JoJo's Bizarre Adventure. Due to her growing interest in the series, she would join Skype reading sessions with other fans. Eventually, she was inspired to pursue a career in voice acting, but her parents initially disapproved of her plans. Instead, she would initially study at a graphic design vocational school before spending a year as a dental assistant. Once she was able to save enough money for tuition, she enrolled in a voice acting training school.

After finishing her training, Fairouz became affiliated with the voice acting agency Pro-Fit. In 2019, she was cast in her first major role as Hibiki Sakura, the protagonist of the anime television series How Heavy Are the Dumbbells You Lift?. She and Kaito Ishikawa performed the series' opening theme "Onegai Muscle" (お願いマッスル), and as part of promotions for the series, she appeared in various weightlifting videos. She was cast as Emily Orange in the multimedia franchise Kandagawa Jet Girls and Eripiyo in the 2020 anime series If My Favorite Pop Idol Made It to the Budokan, I Would Die; she also performed the latter series' ending theme "Momoiro Kataomoi", a cover of a song originally performed by Aya Matsuura.

In 2020, Fairouz was one of the recipients of the Best New Actress Award at the 14th Seiyu Awards. In 2021, she voiced the role of Manatsu Natsuumi/Cure Summer in Tropical-Rouge! Pretty Cure.

On 4 April 2021, Fairouz voiced the role of Jolyne Cujoh in the anime adaptation of the sixth story arc of JoJo's Bizarre Adventure, Stone Ocean.

Following the closure of Pro-Fit on 31 March 2022, Fairouz became affiliated with Raccoon Dog, a voice acting agency founded by voice actor Nobuhiko Okamoto.

On 31 December 2024, it was announced by both Raccoon Dog and Fairouz herself that she had been diagnosed with post-traumatic stress disorder a few months prior, and would be temporarily restricting some of her activities to focus on her recovery. On 31 March 2025, Fairouz announced that she left Raccoon Dog and joined Mausu Promotion as her new agency. She also announced that she was fully resuming her activities.

== Personal life ==
Her older brother, Gihādo Kadota (門田ギハード, Kadota Gihādo; also Gihad Kadota), is an ice climber who represents Japan in competitions.

She is conversant in Arabic, including Egyptian Arabic.

== Filmography ==
=== TV anime ===
2019

- One-Punch Man as Female Citizen A
- Dr. Stone as People of the World
- Is It Wrong to Try to Pick Up Girls in a Dungeon? II as Squad Leader
- How Heavy Are the Dumbbells You Lift? as Hibiki Sakura
- Cautious Hero: The Hero Is Overpowered but Overly Cautious as Valkyrie
- Kandagawa Jet Girls as Emily Orange

2020

- If My Favorite Pop Idol Made It to the Budokan, I Would Die as Eripiyo
- Kiratto Pri☆Chan as Alice Kagayaki
- Mewkledreamy as Tokiwa Anzai
- Monster Girl Doctor as Kay Arte
- Yashahime as Takechiyo
- Fruits Basket as Female Student
- By the Grace of the Gods as Jane

2021

- Tropical-Rouge! Pretty Cure as Manatsu Natsuumi/Cure Summer
- Full Dive as Alicia
- Tokyo Revengers as Manjirō Sano (young)
- Mewkledreamy Mix! as Tokiwa Anzai
- Kageki Shojo!! as Sayako Yamada
- Rumble Garanndoll as Rin Akagi
- Ojarumaru as Osei Shōnagon

2022

- Trapped in a Dating Sim: The World of Otome Games Is Tough for Mobs as Angelica Rapha Redgrave
- Yu-Gi-Oh! Go Rush!! as Nyandestar
- Skeleton Knight in Another World as Arianne Glenys Maple
- In the Heart of Kunoichi Tsubaki as Sumire
- Shine Post as Remi Nashinoki
- The Eminence in Shadow as Delta
- Chainsaw Man as Power
- Bibliophile Princess as Sophia

2023

- Handyman Saitou in Another World as Raelza
- YouTuNya as Nya
- Magical Destroyers as Anarchy
- Summoned to Another World for a Second Time as Livaia
- KonoSuba: An Explosion on This Wonderful World! as Cecily
- The Most Heretical Last Boss Queen as Pride Royal Ivy
- Mushoku Tensei: Jobless Reincarnation 2 as Linia Dedoldia
- Ragna Crimson as Slime
- KamiErabi God.app as Mitsuko
- My Daughter Left the Nest and Returned an S-Rank Adventurer as Marguerite
- The Vexations of a Shut-In Vampire Princess as Nelia Cunningham
- Doraemon as Lotte Munchausen

2024

- Villainess Level 99 as Yumiella Dolkness
- Four Knights of the Apocalypse as Gawain
- I Was Reincarnated as the 7th Prince so I Can Take My Time Perfecting My Magical Ability as Grim
- Kaiju No. 8 as Kikoru Shinomiya
- Mysterious Disappearances as Sumireko Ogawa
- Viral Hit as Aki Yashio
- Bye Bye, Earth as Belle Lablac
- Mayonaka Punch as Live
- Let This Grieving Soul Retire! as Liz Smart
- 365 Days to the Wedding as Nao Umiyama
- Negative Positive Angler as Hana Ayukawa
- Magilumiere Magical Girls Inc. as Kana Sakuragi
- Tōhai as Amina
- Dragon Ball Daima as Panzy
- Heian-chō Mattari Holiday (Note: A collaboration anime special of Ojarumaru and Dear Radiance) as Osei Shōnagon

2025

- I'm Living with an Otaku NEET Kunoichi!? as Ayame Momochi
- Okinawa de Suki ni Natta Ko ga Hōgen Sugite Tsurasugiru as Kana Higa
- Catch Me at the Ballpark! as Ruriko
- Detectives These Days Are Crazy! as Azuha Hoshino
- New Saga as Lise
- Clevatess as Carme
- This Monster Wants to Eat Me as Miko Yashiro
- Tojima Wants to Be a Kamen Rider as Yukarisu

2026

- Chained Soldier 2 as Mira Kamiunten
- Dead Account as Kiyomi Urusugawa
- Re:Zero 4th Season as Shaula
- The Classroom of a Black Cat and a Witch as Leo Regulus
- Go for It, Nakamura! as Hifumi Kawamura
- Chainsmoker Cat as Ouji Ruko
- The World's Strongest Witch as Elmina
- Magical Girl Raising Project: Restart as Masked Wonder

2027

- The Guy She Was Interested in Wasn't a Guy at All as Mao

=== Animated films ===
- Happy-Go-Lucky Days (2020) as Sayoko
- Eiga Shimajirō Shimajirō to Yūki no Uta (2025) as Miley
- Chainsaw Man – The Movie: Reze Arc (2025) as Power
- Cosmic Princess Kaguya! (2026) as Otako the Loyal Dog

=== VAs/ONAs ===
- Zenonzard: The Animation Episode 0 (2019) as Ruri Minamino
- JoJo's Bizarre Adventure: Stone Ocean (2021–22) as Jolyne Cujoh, Jolyne Cujoh Look-alike, Irene
- Akuma-kun (2023) as Gremory
- Scott Pilgrim Takes Off (2023) as Ramona Flowers
- Pokémon Concierge (2023) as Alisa
- Tokyo Override (2024) as Kai
- Disney Twisted-Wonderland: The Animation – Episode of Savanaclaw (2026) as Yuuka Hirasaka

=== Video games ===
2019

- Fire Emblem Heroes as Phina
- Kemono Friends 3 as Reindeer
- MapleStory as female Hoyoung

2020

- White Cat Tennis as Haru
- Kandagawa Jet Girls as Emily Orange
- Fate/Grand Order as Sei Shōnagon
- KonoSuba: Fantastic Days as Cecily
- Marco & the Galaxy Dragon as Ruri
- Azur Lane as USS Intrepid (CV-11)
- Cytus II as Cherry
- Kingdom of Hero as Shiv
- Summer Pockets Reflection Blue as Shiki Kamiyama
- Dragalia Lost as Nadine
- Kantai Collection as USS Hornet (CV-8)
- Ano Hi no Tabibito, Fureau Mirai as Tamaki Aoi
- Granblue Fantasy as Fiorito

2021

- Magia Record: Puella Magi Madoka Magica Side Story as San Kagura
- Epic Seven as Landy
- Yuki Yuna Is a Hero: Hanayui no Kirameki as Hime Hokkedō
- Wonder Boy: Asha in Monster World as Asha, and various other roles
- The Legend of Heroes: Trails Through Daybreak as Ashen Lu
- Blue Archive as Fuuka Aikiyo
- Cookie Run: Kingdom as Mala Sauce Cookie

2022

- JoJo's Bizarre Adventure: Last Survivor as Jolyne Cujoh
- JoJo's Bizarre Adventure: All Star Battle R as Jolyne Cujoh
- Trinity Trigger as Wiz
- The Legend of Heroes: Trails Through Daybreak II as Celis Ortesia, and Ashen Lu
- Star Ocean: The Divine Force as Marielle L. Kenny
- Goonya Monster as Pirarucu
- Path to Nowhere as EMP
- Echocalypse: Scarlet Covenant as Mori, Brown

2023

- Fire Emblem Engage as Yunaka
- Octopath Traveler II as Ori
- 404 Game Re:set as Virtua Fighter
- Goddess of Victory: Nikke as Power, Belorta, Soldier FA
- Reverse: 1999 as Eternity
- Umamusume: Pretty Derby as Sirius Symboli
- Takt Op. Symphony as Tannhauser
- Armored Core VI: Fires of Rubicon as Ayre
- Omega Strikers as Vyce
- Persona 5 Tactica as Luca, Guernica
- Touhou Gensou Eclipse as Reimu Hakurei

2024

- Pokémon Masters EX as Iono
- Unicorn Overlord as Melisandre
- Rise of the Rōnin as Female Protagonist/Blade Twin
- Eiyuden Chronicle: Hundred Heroes as CJ
- Solo Leveling: Arise as Emma Laurent
- Mahjong Kings as Sphinx
- Metaphor: ReFantazio as Catherina Grann
- Genshin Impact as Xilonen
- The Hokkaido Serial Murder Case: The Okhotsk Disappearance – Memories in Ice, Tearful Figurine as Aya
- Tasogare ni Hisomu Fukurou to, Akegata no Subaru as Honoka Takamura
- The Legend of Heroes: Trails Beyond the Horizon as Celis Ortesia
- Romancing SaGa 2: Revenge of the Seven as Orieve

2025

- Rusty Rabbit as Anna
- The Hundred Line: Last Defense Academy as Darumi Amemiya
- Scar-Lead Salvation as Willow Martin
- Ghost of Yōtei as Atsu
- No Sleep for Kaname Date – From AI: The Somnium Files as Hina Tsukiyono

2026

- Marvel Tōkon: Fighting Souls as Magik
- Arknights: Endfield as Tangtang
- Zenless Zone Zero as Cissia
- Nekopara: Sekai Connect as Palmyra
- Suikoden Star Leap as Shirin
- Brigandine Abyss as Kyrika

=== Dubbing ===
==== Live-action ====
- The Acolyte, Mae (Amandla Stenberg)
- Alien: Romulus, Navarro (Aileen Wu)
- The Apprentice, Ivana Trump (Maria Bakalova)
- The Batman, Selina Kyle / Catwoman (Zoë Kravitz)
- Black Christmas, Jesse (Brittany O'Grady)
- Debris, Nicole Hegmann (Sarah Desjardins)
- DMZ, Tenny (Sydney Park)
- Freaks Out, Matilde (Aurora Giovinazzo)
- Furiosa: A Mad Max Saga, Imperator Furiosa (Anya Taylor-Joy)
- Gen V, Marie Moreau (Jaz Sinclair)
- How to Marry a Millionaire (New Era Movies edition), Loco Dempsey (Betty Grable)
- I Know What You Did Last Summer (2025), Helen Shivers (Sarah Michelle Gellar)
- Madame Web, Anya Corazon (Isabela Merced)
- The Map of Tiny Perfect Things, Margaret (Kathryn Newton)
- Masters of the Universe, Adora / She-Ra (Lauren Saliu)
- MaXXXine, Molly Bennett (Lily Collins)
- Ms. Marvel, Nakia Bahadir (Yasmeen Fletcher)
- No Way Up, Ava (Sophie McIntosh)
- Pretty Little Liars: Original Sin, Noa Olivar (Maia Reficco)
- Red One, Grýla (Kiernan Shipka)
- Resident Evil: Welcome to Raccoon City, Claire Redfield (Kaya Scodelario)
- Scream VI, Quinn Bailey (Liana Liberato)
- St. Elmo's Fire (2022 The Cinema edition), Julianna "Jules" Van Patten (Demi Moore)
- Superman, Eve Teschmacher (Sara Sampaio)
- Transformers: Rise of the Beasts, Arcee (Liza Koshy)
- Vesper, Camellia (Rosy McEwen)

==== Animation ====
- Batwheels, Bibi
- The Boss Baby: Family Business, Glue Baby
- Gameoverse, Malice
- Hamster & Gretel, Gretel Grant-Gomez
- Playmobil: The Movie, Dr. Greta Grim
