= Suzie Yeung =

American voice actress (born 1991)

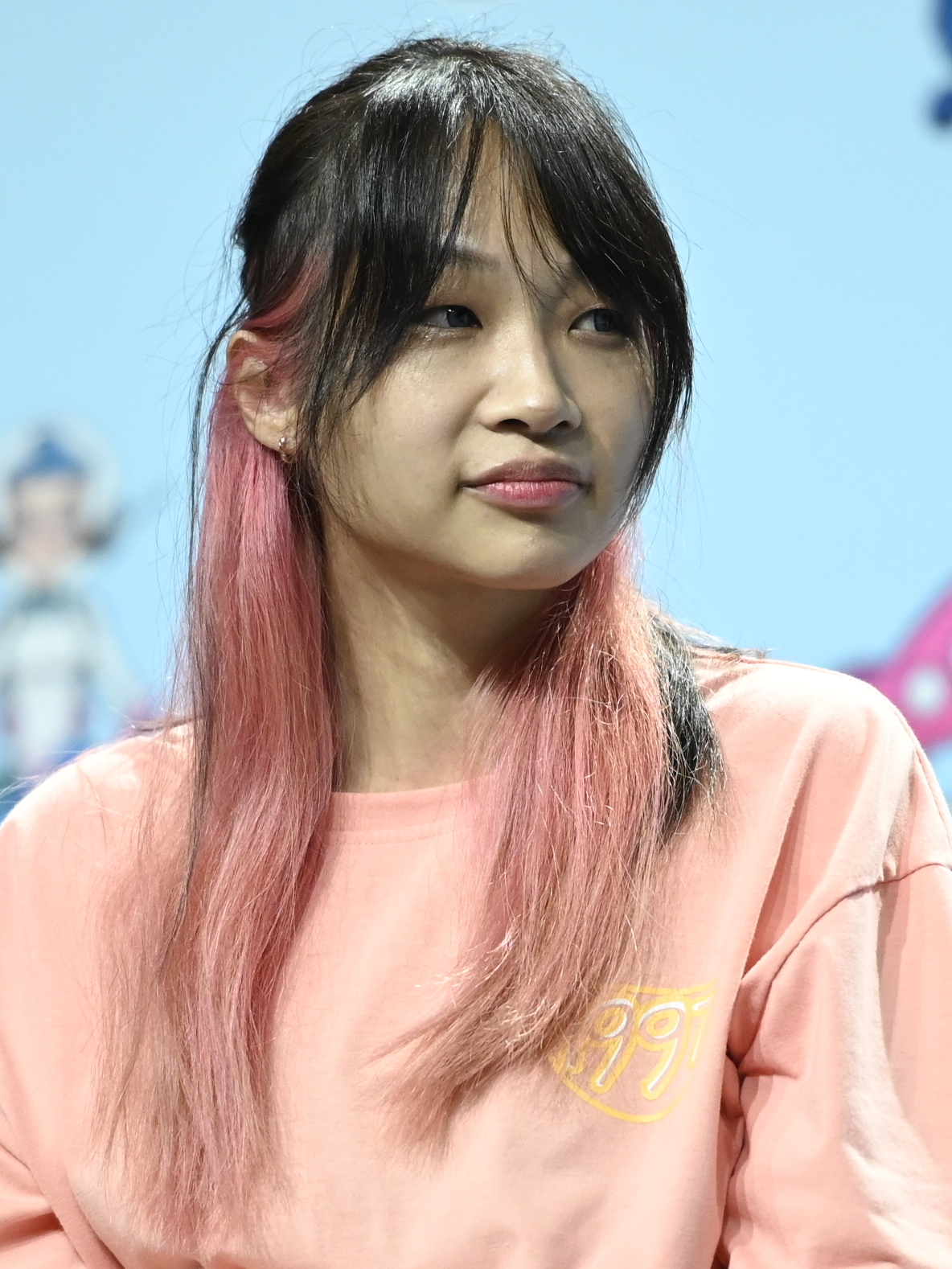
- Yeung in 2023
- Born: June 12, 1991 (age 35); Boston, Massachusetts, U.S.
- Occupation: Voice actress
- Years active: 2018–present
- Website: suzieyeungvo.com

Suzie Yeung (born June 12, 1991) is an American voice actress. Her video game roles include Yuffie Kisaragi in the Final Fantasy VII Remake trilogy, Eula and Vodyanitsa in Genshin Impact, Chitose Fujinomiya in Like a Dragon: Infinite Wealth, Piper Wheel in Zenless Zone Zero, Hsin in Wuthering Waves, Hope in Fortnite Battle Royale, Hanya in Honkai: Star Rail, Invisible Woman in Marvel Rivals, Fuuka Yamagishi in Persona 3 Reload, and Saria in The Legend of Zelda: Ocarina of Time. Her anime roles include Makima in Chainsaw Man, Kaban and Lucky Beast in Kemono Friends, Vladilena "Lena" Milizé in 86, Kumiko "Josee" Yamamura in Josee, the Tiger and the Fish, Yuri Honjo in High-Rise Invasion, and Motoko Kusanagi in The Ghost in the Shell.

== Personal life ==
Yeung grew up in Boston, Massachusetts. In addition to English, she can speak Cantonese and Mandarin Chinese and has done voice-over work in all three languages.

== Filmography ==
=== Film ===
Year	Title	Role	Notes	Source
2020	Galaxy Express 999: Eternal Fantasy	Iselle		
2020	Josee, the Tiger and the Fish	Kumiko "Josee" Yamamura		
2020	Goblin Slayer: Goblin's Crown	Rhea Scout		
2021	Demon Slayer: Kimetsu no Yaiba – The Movie: Mugen Train	Ruka Rengoku, Amane Ubuyashiki		
2022	Fruits Basket: Prelude	Kyo Soma (young)		
2022	Inu-Oh	Nariko Hino		
2025	Chainsaw Man – The Movie: Reze Arc	Makima		
2025	Detective Conan: Black Iron Submarine	Naomi Argento		
2025	Virgin Punk: Clockwork Girl	Maggie		

=== Anime ===
Year	Title	Role	Notes	Source
2019	Kemono Friends	Kaban, Lucky Beast, Mirai		
2019–2020	Sword Art Online: Alicization	Mei Mei Xiang		
2019–2020	Kaguya-sama: Love Is War	Mikiti, Rei Onodera		
2020	A Certain Scientific Railgun T	Ryoko Kuriba, Doppelganger		
2020	Gleipnir	Subaru		
2020	Show by Rock!! Mashumairesh!!	Uiui		
2020	Rent-A-Girlfriend	Sumi Sakurasawa		
2020	The Misfit of Demon King Academy	Sheila Glanzudlii		
2020	Kakushigoto	Silvia Kobu		
2020	Appare-Ranman!	Xialian Jing		
2020	By the Grace of the Gods	Eliaria Jamil		
2020	Assault Lily Bouquet	Fumi Futagawa		
2020	Super HxEros	Chacha		
2020	The Irregular at Magic High School: Visitor Arc	Angelina Kudou Shields		
2020	Black Rock Shooter	Yomi Takanashi		
2020	Jujutsu Kaisen	Tsumiki Fushiguro		
2020	That Time I Got Reincarnated as a Slime: Rimuru's Glamorous Life as a Teacher	Illory		
2020	Fly Me to the Moon	Naoko Yanagi		
2020–2025	Fire Force	Gold, girl, additional voices		
2021	Attack on Titan: The Final Season	Lara Tybur		
2021	Fruits Basket	Kyo Soma (young)		
2021	Black Clover	Ciel Grinberryall		
2021	Dr. Stone: Stone Wars	Suzu		
2021	Thus Spoke Rohan Kishibe	Naoko Osato		
2021	High-Rise Invasion	Yuri Honjō		
2021	Tamayomi	Iori Kobayashi		
2021	Cells at Work! Code Black	Macrophage		
2021	Sleepy Princess in the Demon Castle	Alazif		
2021	Wonder Egg Priority	Koito Nagase		
2021	The Quintessential Quintuplets ∬	Eba		
2021	Back Arrow	Sam		
2021	Pretty Boy Detective Club	Mayumi Dojima		
2021	86	Vladilena "Lena" Milizé		
2021	I've Been Killing Slimes for 300 Years and Maxed Out My Level	Shalsha		
2021	Magatsu Wahrheit -Zuerst-	Yasmin		
2021	Moriarty the Patriot	Miss Hudson		
2021	Love Live! Nijigasaki High School Idol Club	Ayumu Uehara		
2021	Hortensia Saga	Qoo Morimoru		
2021	The Heike Story	Taira no Tokuko		
2021	Mieruko-chan	Kyōsuke Yotsuya		
2021	Yashahime	Oharu		
2021	Pokémon Evolutions	Jupiter		
2021	JoJo's Bizarre Adventure: Stone Ocean	Miraschon		
2021–2024	Demon Slayer: Kimetsu no Yaiba	Ruka Rengoku, Amane Ubuyashiki		
2021–present	Mushoku Tensei	Shizuka Nanahoshi		
2022	Akebi's Sailor Uniform	Erika		
2022	Girls' Frontline	PPSH-43		
2022	Komi Can't Communicate	Chika Netsuno		
2022	Lupin the 3rd Part 6	Mathia Farah		
2022	Kakegurui Twin	Mikura Sado		
2022	Kingdom	Xiang, Wan Ji (young)		
2022	Engage Kiss	Ayano Yugiri		
2022	Chiikawa	Hachiware		
2022–present	Chainsaw Man	Makima		
2023	Digimon Adventure	Mimi Tachikawa		
2023	Gunbuster	Schoolgirl Alpha		
2023	Gamera Rebirth	Emiko Melchiorri		
2024	Undead Unluck	Backs / Bunny		
2024	Code Geass: Rozé of the Recapture	Sakuya Sumeragi		
2024	Solo Leveling	Akari Shimizu		
2024–present	Ranma ½	Ranma Saotome (girl)		
2024–present	Mission: Yozakura Family	Nanao Yozakura, woman with piercings		
2025	The Apothecary Diaries	Shisui / Loulan		
2025	Sanda	Fumi Namatame		
2025–present	Dandadan	Rin Sawaki		
2025–present	Yaiba: Samurai Legend	Nadeshiko Yamato		
2026	Playing Death Games to Put Food on the Table	Yuki		
2026–present	The Ghost in the Shell	Motoko Kusanagi		

=== Animation ===
Year	Title	Role	Notes	Source
2021	Rainbow High	Daphne Minton		
2022	Brown and Friends	Cony, Sally, Choco, Jessica		
2022–2023	Link Click	Qiao Ling	Chinese donghua; English dub	
2024	Barbie Mysteries: The Great Horse Chase	Renee		
2024	Jentry Chau vs. the Underworld	Solar Tang		
2024	DC Heroes United	Lois Lane		
2025	The Simpsons	Hope	Episode: "Bad Boys... for Life?"	

=== Video games ===
Year	Title	Role	Notes	Ref.
2018	BattleCON: Online	Anath Adrasteia		
2019	Professor Lupo and His Horrible Pets	Fire, Default Interface		
2019	Call of Duty: Mobile	Urban Tracker		
2019	Song of Bloom	Narrator (English, Mandarin Chinese)		
2020	War of the Visions: Final Fantasy Brave Exvius	Ildyra		
2020	Guardian Tales	Carol, Priscilla		
2020	Professor Lupo: Ocean	Ro		
2020	OneeChanbara Origin	Aya		
2020	Arena of Valor	Sinestrea		
2021	Cookie Run: Kingdom	Pumpkin Pie Cookie, Croissant Cookie, Timekeeper Cookie		
2021	Re:Zero − Starting Life in Another World: The Prophecy of the Throne	Sakura Element		
2021	Shadowverse	Sekka, Tien		
2021	Smite	Sentai Mulan, Steel Alchemist Scylla, World Tour Nemesis		
2021	Genshin Impact	Eula, Vodyanitsa		
2021	Final Fantasy VII Remake Intergrade	Yuffie Kisaragi		
2021	Fire Emblem Heroes	Patty, Juno		
2021	Earth Defense Force: World Brothers	Aya, additional voices		
2021	Disgaea 6: Defiance of Destiny	Releiza		
2021	Cris Tales	Abiane, Ella, Fira, Lava, Teressa, Young Kari, others		
2021	Nier Reincarnation	F66x		
2021	Aliens: Fireteam Elite	Player		
2021	Mary Skelter Finale	Riley		
2021	Demon Slayer: Kimetsu no Yaiba – The Hinokami Chronicles	Ruka Rengoku		
2021	Tales of Luminaria	Yelsy		
2022	Anno: Mutationem	Ann Flores		
2022	Lost Judgment: The Kaito Files	Mikiko Sadamoto		
2022	Aether Gazer	Oneiroi		
2022	Tower of Fantasy	Shirli, Nemesis		
2022	Live A Live	Lei Kugo		
2022	Ghostbusters: Spirits Unleashed	Ghostbusters, civilians		
2022	Goddess of Victory: Nikke	Admi, Noise, Yulha		
2022	Star Ocean: The Divine Force	Nina Deforges		
2022	Mobile Legends: Bang Bang	Joy		
2023	Octopath Traveler II	Ochette		
2023	Higan: Eruthyll	Follett, Isa		
2023	Path to Nowhere	OwO, Shalom		
2023	Loop8: Summer of Gods	Kunie "Kuni" Enan, additional voices		
2023	Master Detective Archives: Rain Code	Waruna		
2023	The Legend of Heroes: Trails into Reverie	Rixia Mao, Nadia Rayne		
2023	Tower of God: New World	Serena Linen, Miseng Yeo		
2023	Palia	Tish, Kenyatta		
2023	Avatar: The Last Airbender – Quest for Balance	Azula, Joo Dee, additional voices		
2023	Nickelodeon All-Star Brawl 2	Azula		
2023	Avatar: Generations	Azula		
2023	Omega Strikers	Nao		
2023	Punishing: Gray Raven	Luna, Selene		
2023	Honkai: Star Rail	Hanya		
2024	Like a Dragon: Infinite Wealth	Chitose Fujinomiya		
2024	Persona 3 Reload	Fuuka Yamagishi		
2024	Final Fantasy VII Rebirth	Yuffie Kisaragi		
2024	Unicorn Overlord	Primm		
2024	Solo Leveling: Arise	Akari Shimizu		
2024	Fortnite	Hope		
2024	Zenless Zone Zero	Piper Wheel		
2024	The Legend of Heroes: Trails Through Daybreak	Rixia Mao, citizens		
2024	The Star Named EOS	Nat		
2024	Romancing SaGa 2: Revenge of the Seven	Rocbouquet		
2024	Farmagia	Chica		
2024	Slitterhead	Julee		
2025	Infinity Nikki	Ena		
2025	Marvel Rivals	Susan Storm-Richards / Invisible Woman, H.E.R.B.I.E.		
2025	The Legend of Heroes: Trails Through Daybreak II	Nadia Rayne		
2025	Avowed	Additional voices		
2025	Fatal Fury: City of the Wolves	Hotaru Futaba		
2025	Rune Factory: Guardians of Azuma	Kaguya		
2025	Shadowverse: Worlds Beyond	Light of the Dewdrop, Sincerity of the Dewdrop, additional voices		
2025	Date Everything!	Textbox-chan		
2025	Marvel Mystic Mayhem	Susan Storm-Richards / Invisible Woman		
2025	Demon Slayer: Kimetsu no Yaiba – The Hinokami Chronicles 2	Amane Ubuyashiki		
2025	Shinobi: Art of Vengeance	Tomoe		
2025	Silent Hill f	Hinako Shimizu		
2025	Nicktoons & The Dice of Destiny	Azula		
2025	Ghost of Yōtei	Kiku		
2025	Digimon Story: Time Stranger	Lunamon, Lekismon, Crescemon, Dianamon		
2025	Octopath Traveler 0	Macy, Reime		
2026	The Legend of Heroes: Trails Beyond the Horizon	Nadia Rayne, Rixia Mao, additional voices		
2026	Code Vein II	Lou MagMell		
2026	Yakuza Kiwami 3 & Dark Ties	Chitose Fujinomiya	DLC	
2026	Neverness to Everness	Esper Zero (Female)		
2026	The Adventures of Elliot: The Millennium Tales	Sandy, Marnie, Lowelle		
2026	Call of Duty: Black Ops 7	Nekomancer	DLC	
2026	Echoes of Aincrad	Additional voices		
2026	Avatar Legends: The Fighting Game	Azula		
2026	Star Wars Zero Company	The Rogue, additional voices		
2026	Dead or Alive 6 Last Round	Minato	DLC	
2026	Wuthering Waves	Hsin		
2026	Phantom Blade Zero	Yu'Er		
2026	The Legend of Zelda: Ocarina of Time	Saria		
2027	Final Fantasy VII Revelation	Yuffie Kisaragi		
