= List of Undead Unluck characters =

The Undead Unluck manga series features an extensive cast of characters created by Yoshifumi Tozuka.

== Main characters ==
=== Fuuko Izumo ===
Voiced by: Moe Kahara (Japanese); Jackie Lastra (English)

Fuuko Izumo (出雲 風子, Izumo Fūko) is an 18-year-old girl who teams up with Andy. When she was a child, her Negator ability awakened and she accidentally killed her parents, along with other people, in a plane malfunction. As such, she became severely asocial out of fear of harming others with her ability, and was suicidal until meeting Andy. Her Negator ability, "Unluck" causes whoever touches her skin-to-skin to encounter misfortune ranging from mild to severe based on how long the contact was and the level of affection she harbours to the target. Following the events of the Ragnarok arc, she becomes the new leader of the Union in the 101st loop. She learned to bypass the skin-to-skin and affection level weakness by creating "Bad Bullets", where she places her Unluck into the bullets and shoots it to the target. Once it hits the target, Unluck will make way to the bullet, hitting the target in the process.

=== Andy ===
Voiced by: Yuichi Nakamura (Japanese); Ben Balmaceda (English)

Andy (アンディ, Andi) is a suicidal and reckless man who teams up with Fuuko. He is obsessed with finding a way to kill himself and takes an interest in Fuuko for her Unluck ability. His Negator ability "Undead" prevents him from dying and he can use his regenerative abilities to do a multitude of things, such as firing his finger like a bullet. He has a card in his head that, when removed, releases a second personality called Victhor. A running gag is his clothes being destroyed, as he can not regenerate them, but this stopped when he tames the UMA Clothes. However, his crotch still gets exposed at times whether by accident or on purpose by UMA Clothes. It is later revealed that Andy is one of the only people capable of entering the next loop without Ark, as his ability means he does not die even when the world is destroyed.

== The Union ==
=== Juiz d'Arc ===
Voiced by: Mariya Ise (Japanese); Jenny Yokobori (English)

Juiz d'Arc (ジュイス ダルク, Juisu Daruku) is the first seater, hence the leader, as well as the founder of the Union along with Victor. Her Negator ability "Unjustice" allows her to force targets to enact the opposite of their sense of "justice" by looking at them. She has tamed the UMA Move, which is the Union's main mode of transportation. After the Unbelievable arc, she reveals that the world is stuck in a loop and she keeps her memories by using an artifact called the "Ark," and has lived for millions of years accompanied by Victor so that they may finally kill God. Fuuko replaces her as leader of the Union for the final loop, where she is reincarnated as a cheerful child named Julia U. Stitia (ジュリア ユー スティティア, Juria U. Sutitia).

=== Shen Xiang ===
Voiced by: Natsuki Hanae (Japanese); Aleks Le (English)

Shen Xiang (シェン シアン, Shen Shian) is a Chinese martial artist who is very perky, as well as being the second seater. His former Negator ability, "Untruth" allowed him to make his targets do the opposite of what they intended to, so long as he was looking at them with at least one eye and was fond of them. He also carries a "Nyon-Kinko Staff" artifact which can extend and contract long enough to reach space, as well as a rideable cloud named Kinto-Un. After his battle with his master resulted in his death, Mui used an artifact to revive him as a Jiangshi, losing his Negator abilities but keeping his natural martial arts skills.

=== Mui ===
Voiced by: Yui Ishikawa (Japanese); Emi Lo (English)

Mui (ムイ) is Shen's subordinate. Before the Union's battle with Feng, Shen's master, she was Shen's assistant. Though she has no ability, she makes up for it by using Artifacts and Martial Arts. After Shen's death, "Untruth" was transferred to her.

=== Tatiana ===
Voiced by: Rie Kugimiya (Japanese); Michelle Marie (English)

Tatiana (タチアナ, Tachiana) is a young Russian girl who cares for her teammates greatly. She is the fifth seater. When she gained her Negator ability, her powers accidentally destroyed her home, killing her parents. She was to be sold on the black market, before being saved by Billy. She lives in a spherical robot suit, and her Negator ability "Untouchable" creates an untouchable barrier around her, although she always has a hole open around her mouth to eat through.

=== Top Bull Sparx ===
Voiced by: Nobuhiko Okamoto (Japanese); Edward A. Mendoza (English)

Top Bull Sparx (トップ ブル スパークス, Toppu Buru Supākusu) is a short-tempered Brazilian 15-year old. His Negator ability "Unstoppable" grants him super speed if he attempts to slow down once he reaches a certain speed, and his body must undergo a significant change in shape for him to stop, such as suffering a heavy injury. He is the seventh seater, In the past, he was a poor boy who intended to lose a race so his friends could have a better life, however "Unstoppable" was transferred to him when he slowed down, resulting in him killing two of his friends and injuring the other by crashing into them. He joined the Union soon afterwards. In the 101st loop, he avoided his tragedy and joined the Union when he is older.

=== Isshin ===
==== Haruka Yamaoka ====
Haruka Yamaoka (山岡 春歌, Yamaoka Haruka) is the sixth seater of the Union and the 13th to bear the name of Isshin (一心) - the name her family of blacksmiths have carried for generations - which causes her anxiety and fear of not living up to her title. A running gag is that she is too anxious to talk and communicates through signs. She is a large and muscular woman in a large suit of armor. Anything she uses her Negator ability "Unbreakable" on is granted enhanced durability, to the point of becoming indestructible.

==== Shunkai Yamaoka ====
Shunkai Yamaoka (山岡 春歌, Yamaoka Shunkai) is the 12th to bear the name of Isshin and the current holder of the Negator ability "Unbreakable" in the 101st loop, who joins Fuuko's Union temporarily, until Haruka comes of age.

=== Phil Hawkins ===
Phil Hawkins (フィル ホーキンス, Firu Hōkinsu) is a young boy with a body made of artifacts. He is also the fourth seater. His ability is "Unfeel", which negates his senses and emotions, allowing him to use artifacts without suffering their side effects.

=== Nico Vorgeil ===
Voiced by: Kōji Yusa (Japanese); Alan Lee (English)

Nico Vorgeil (ニコ フォーゲイル, Niko Fōgeiru) is the Union's top inventor. His Negator ability "Unforgettable" renders him incapable of forgetting any and all information, starting with the death of his wife, when his ability manifested, no matter how minuscule. He is the eighth seater.Thus, his mind is being "crushed by a never-ending stack of information." He fights using levitating, orb-shaped devices called Psycho Pods which he stores his unnecessary memories on and information on fighting styles so he can replicate them. They can also be used as lasers, transportation, and create clones of people based on Nico's memories called "Astral Dolls".

=== Victor ===
Voiced by: Yuichi Nakamura (Japanese); Ben Balmaceda (English)

Victor (ヴィクトル, Vikutōru) is the original personality before Andy, and co-founder of the Union along with Juiz. Unlike Andy, he is ruthless and kills without a hint of mercy. He has a better mastery of "Undead". He retains all memories of all the previous loops, as only he is capable of surviving Ragnarok, and has thus lived for billions of years. Victor is in love with Juiz, and seeks to kill her to finally end her suffering. Initially antagonistic towards Fuuko and Andy, he makes peace with them within Andy's psyche, deciding to believe in Juiz's trust in them and see where their determination leads.

=== Chikara Shigeno ===
Voiced by: Ayumu Murase (Japanese); Kevin Andrew Rivera (English)

Chikara Shigeno (重野 力, Shigeno Chikara) is a recently awakened Negator. He is somewhat cowardly and tends to panic, but will show courage when he needs to. He is the eleventh seater. His ability is "Unmove", which negates the movement of anything he looks at so long as he himself is not moving. Like Fuuko, he accidentally killed his parents when his ability first manifested. In the 101st loop, he is less anxious and does not have issues with trembling. This is thanks to Fuuko's intervention leading to his parents living.

=== Gina Chamber ===
Voiced by: Aoi Yūki (Japanese); Amber Lee Connors (English)

Gina Chamber (ジーナ チェンバー, Jīna Chenbā) is a former member of the Union. She was an elderly woman from Russia who used her ability "Unchange" to allow her to negate any change in inanimate objects, which she used to make herself look younger by using her negator ability to freeze her makeup in place. She fell in love with Andy, but was killed by him so Fuuko could join the Union and died peacefully after Andy kissed her and said she was beautiful, even after her true age was revealed. Her ability manifested when the UMA Heat attacked her village, resulting in her ability freezing the air and killing 40,000 people by suffocation.

=== Mico Vorgeil ===
Voiced by: Miyari Nemoto (Japanese); Emi Lo (English)

Mico Vorgeil (ミコ フォーゲイル, Miko Fōgeiru) is a scientist employed by the Union where she works as one of Nico Vorgeil's assistants. She is also Nico's daughter, and the second most competent scientist behind him.

=== Void Volks ===
Voiced by: Kenji Nomura (Japanese); Daniel Walton (English)

Void Volks (ボイド ボルクス, Boido Borukusu) is a heavyweight boxing champion and former member of the Union. He has no qualms with murder, and believes that Negators who are not part of the Union are "UMA Freaks". His Negator ability, "Unavoidable" negates his opponent's ability to dodge when he assumes a certain stance before attacking. In the original loop, Andy killed him with his Parts Bullet when Void failed to circumvent his regeneration. He is recruited by Fuuko during the final loop, his tragedy of killing his final opponent in previous loops having been averted by her and his love of boxing invigorated.

=== Ichico Nemuri ===
Ichico Nemuri (イチコ ネムリ, Ichiko Nemuri) is Nico's deceased wife and Mico's mother. She served the Union as both a member of the Roundtable and a member of the science division, where she met Nico. Her Negator ability, "Unsleep," rendered her unable to sleep, which eventually led to her death via exhaustion. In the final loop, she avoids her fate by learning astral projection.

== Under ==
=== Billy Alfred ===
Voiced by: Rikiya Koyama (Japanese); Jonah Scott (English)

Billy Alfred (ビリー アルフレッド, Birī Arufureddo) was originally a member of the Union, but later revealed to be a traitor. His Negator ability was thought to be "Unbelievable," which let him shoot bullets in directions that seemingly would miss his target, but would ricochet in order to hit them. His true Negator ability, "Unfair," negates the fairness of a user having only one ability, granting him the power to copy other abilities as long as the target views him as an enemy. As a result, he has access to several Negator abilities. This is later revealed to be a ruse, as Billy used his betrayal to gain the abilities of the others so they would not have to die fighting God. He is blind but has enhanced hearing as a result. In the 101st loop, the interpretation of his ability changed, and Unfair activates when he acknowledges another's strength.

=== Rip Tristan ===
Voiced by: Yuki Kaji (Japanese); Stephen Fu (English)

Rip Tristan (リップ トリスタン, Rippu Torisutan) is a member of Under. His Negator ability, "Unrepair", negates the ability to repair any damage he inflicts which remains unless he dies or he deactivates it. He also has the "Blade Runner" artifact, which creates blades when he kicks and allows him to fly. He was killed by Andy, but is resurrected in a younger body through Feng's use of an artifact called "Life is Strange", and is later restored to his true age by Anno Un using the same artifact. He was formerly a surgeon whose ability led to the death of his lover Leila. He and Latla seek the Ark in order to return to the past and save her, putting them at odds with the Union.

=== Latla Mirah ===
Voiced by: Ikumi Hasegawa (Japanese); Kate Clarke (English)

Latla Mirah (ラトラ ミラー, Ratora Mirā) is Rip's closest friend and a fortune teller. Her Negator ability, "Untrust", negates her previously accurate predictions, which allows her to redirect any offensive attacks and guarantees events. She was killed by Rip after sacrificing herself by telling him to attack Andy.

=== Feng Kowloon ===
Voiced by: Toshiyuki Morikawa (Japanese); Christopher Lewis (English)

Feng Kowloon (ファン クーロン, Fan Kūron) is a Chinese martial artist who always wears a hood, later revealed to be Shen's old mentor. Obsessed with being the "strongest in all of creation", Feng took on disciples to raise, including Shen and his sister, Mei, but intended kill them so he may get stronger. Feng is responsible for the death of Shen's sister, the catalyst for Shen's quest for strength. Though an old man when he meets Shen, he restores his youth with the artifact "Life is Strange", which he also uses to resurrect Rip. In the 101st loop, it was reveal that he has "Unfade" which prevents him from ageing or dying from old age. As a stipulation to fight Fuuko, he raised Shen and his sister without the intention to kill them this time around.

=== Creed Deckard ===
Voiced by: Hiroki Yasumoto (Japanese); Chris Tergliafera (English)

Creed Deckard (クリード デッカード, Kurīdo Dekkādo) is a Negator who specializes in weaponry. His Negator ability, "Undecrease," allows him to fire weapons and explosives without reloading, though he has to expend the ammo fired for this to work. If his explosives fail to explode, he cannot use them again until they do.

=== Backs ===
Voiced by: Hina Kino (Japanese); Suzie Yeung (English)

Backs (バックス, Bakkusu) is a child-like member who wears a bunny costume, hence her nickname "Bunny". Her Negator ability, "Unback", allows her to trap objects in eggs. She herself does not understand her ability.

=== Tella ===
Voiced by: Kensho Ono (Japanese); Brandon Jay^{Ep. 25 credits} (English)

Tella (テラー, Terā) is a member of Under and Billy's radioman during their mercenary days. His Negator ability, "Untell", renders him unable to communicate in any way that utilizes his body, which he takes advantage of by being a shield to any attacks as getting attacks meant that he is telling someone. He fights with levitating speakers that also allow him to create invisible walls.

=== Yusai ===
Voiced by: Sumire Uesaka (Japanese); Risa Mei (English)

Yusai (友才, Yūsai) is a member of Under. She was formerly Andy's teacher, and fell in love with him, although he rejected her advances. Her Negator ability "Undraw" prevents her enemies from drawing their weapons, preventing them from attacking. This also affects herself, however, with her having her mouth stuck to her gourd as a running gag.

=== Sadako Kurusu ===
Sadako Kurusu (来栖 貞子, Kurusu Sadako), also known as "Kururu", is a member of Under and a former pop star whose Negator ability "Unchaste" caused people who felt love to become her captive if she struck a pose, causing them to rush towards her. However, it does not affect those who have not experienced romance at all or those who have already experienced true romance. As such, her ability does not work on any of the Under members except for Tella.

=== Enjin Banba ===
Enjin Banba (円陣) is a member of Under and a former ramen chef. His Negator ability, "Unburn", allows him to prevent objects and people from burning or combusting but not heat. His location was the prize for capturing UMA Eat.

=== Sean Datz ===
Voiced by: Kento Shiraishi (Japanese); Darius Johnson (English)

Sean Datz (ショーン ダッツ, Shōn Dattsu) is an aspiring actor turned gang thug when he developed his "Unseen" ability which turns him invisible when he closes his eyes, which meant that he disappeared each time he blinks, thus making life as an actor impossible. He was forcibly recruited by Rip, but when he tried to kill Fuuko, Andy sliced him in half with his new Deadline move. In the 101st loop, he was recruited by Fuuko before he fell further into crime, and developed Unseen's abilities to make others invisible by touching them.

=== Burn ===
Voiced by: Ryunosuke Watanuki (Japanese); Bill Butts^{Ep. 25 credits} (English)

Burn (バーン, Bān) is a UMA aligned with Under. He was captured by the Union, but was later freed by Billy in order to steal the Roundtable, later killing UMA Winter on Billy's orders. As his name suggests, he is a large monstrous UMA whose body is constantly on fire.

== Other Negators ==
=== Akira Kuno ===
Voiced by: Yumi Uchiyama (Japanese); Anne Yatco (English)

Akira Kuno (久能 明, Kunō Akira) is a manga artist who wrote To You, From Me, Fuuko's favorite manga series. He is a Negator with the ability "Unknown", which caused his entire existence to be unnoticed. He has a G-Pen artifact that allowed him to bring his drawings to life. He used the artifact to create an alternate persona, known as "Anno Un", in order to bypass the effects of his ability. The artifact also granted him knowledge of the future, allowing him to see events that would occur surrounding the Union and Under and allowing him to leave hints in his manga series. During the battle with UMA Autumn the G-Pen was destroyed, rendering Akira imperceivable once again, though he is satisfied that he saved Fuuko's life and that his newfound friends will never forget him. Fuuko stops him from picking up the G-Pen in the final loop, allowing him to live a normal life.

=== Tesshu Isshin ===
Tesshu Isshin (一心 鉄舟, Isshin Tesshū) was the first holder of Unbreakable in the Isshin family and an old friend of UMA Spring.

=== Lucy Hazel ===
Lucy Hazel (ルーシー ヘイゼル, Rūshī Heizeru) is a youth that Andy rescues and befriends during his search for Ruin. Her Negator ability, "Unhealthy", negates any and all forms of healthiness in Lucy's body, rendering her eternally frail and sickly. With most of her life spent indoors, she developed a very active imagination. With the addition of UMA Ghost, she uses this to achieve astral projection by separating her soul from her body, which she teaches to Andy.

== Non-Negators ==
=== Leila Mirah ===
Voiced by: Kana Ichinose (Japanese); Risa Mei (English)

Leila Mirah (ライラ = ミラー, Raira Mirā) was Latla's deceased twin sister as well as Rip's lover. She died from blood loss after Rip's "Unrepair" manifested when he was performing surgery on her as well as from Latla's "Untrust" ability guaranteeing her death. In the 101st loop, she survived thanks to Fuuko's intervention. She ends up marrying Rip.

=== Mei Xiang ===
Mei Xiang (メイ シアン, Mei Shian) is a Chinese martial artist and Shen's younger sister. The two of them were raised and trained by Feng.

=== Veronica Alfred ===
Voiced by: Kana Asumi^{Ep. 25 credits} (Japanese); Rebecca Wang^{Ep. 25 credits} (English)

Veronica Alfred (ベロニカー アルフレッド, Beronika Arufureddo) was Billy's deceased wife. In the 101st loop, she lives and resides in the Union.

=== Betty Alfred ===
Voiced by: Hina Hitsuji^{Ep. 25 credits} (Japanese); Emi Lo^{Ep. 25 credits} (English)

Betty Alfred (ベティー アルフレッド, Betī Arufureddo) was Billy's deceased daughter. In the 101st loop, she lives and resides in the Union.

=== Raita Izumo ===
Raita Izumo (出雲 雷太, Izumo Raita) is Fuuko's father, who was a fan of up-and-coming idol Kaede, eventually marrying her.

=== Kaede Izumo ===
Kaede Izumo (出雲 楓, Izumo Kaede) is Fuuko's mother, formerly Kaede Akashi (明石 楓, Akashi Kaede), who was an up-and-coming idol, eventually marrying her biggest fan Raita.

== God and Regulators ==
=== God / Sun ===
God (神, Kami) is the main antagonist of the series. They are responsible for all the rules of the world, creating UMAs, and forcing Negator abilities onto humanity. Killing them is the main goal of The Union. Their true name is Sun (サン, San). They believe rules are the superior creations, and stands in opposition to Luna.

=== Luna ===
Luna (ルナ, Runa) is the second God responsible for the world's creation. Unlike Sun, Luna believes people are the superior creations to the rules Sun imposes, and created artifacts to help their fight. They are also personally responsible for monitoring Ark, controlling the points that allow someone to loop.

=== Ruin ===
Ruin (ルイン) is a Negator granted the title of Regulator who worships God, aspires to be the "King of Negators", and plots to wipe out the Union to ensure Earth's destruction by God's hands. His Negator ability, "Unruin", which he derives his name from, prevents his body from falling into ruin, giving him immortality like Andy. Additionally, he has tamed the UMAs Blood and Shadow. Blood allows him to manipulate his blood and hypnotize people by piercing their brains; Shadow grants him the ability to move and teleport through shadows and create shadow clones of himself.

=== Seal ===
Seal (シール, Shīru) is a UMA granted the title of Regulator, sent to carry out God's bidding and who aspires to be the "King of UMAs". He has the ability to seal away anything wrapped in the scrolls covering his body and utilize their powers, whether they are a Negator or a UMA. This eventually backfires when he seals Lucy's "Unhealthy" inside himself.

== Master Rules ==
=== Soul ===
Soul (ソウル, Sōru) is a Concept-Type UMA that embodies the concept of soul, thus being one of the strongest UMAs. He is the "First Master Rule UMA" and is the leader of the Master Rules.

=== Death ===
Death (デス, Desu) is a Concept-Type UMA that embodies the concept of death, thus being one of the strongest UMAs. She is the "Second Master Rule UMA", whose Negator is Andy/Victor.

=== Change ===
Change (チェンジ, Chenji) is a Concept-Type UMA that embodies the concept of change, thus being one of the strongest UMAs. She is the "Third Master Rule UMA", whose Negator is Gina.

=== Luck ===
Luck (ラック, Rakku) is a Concept-Type UMA that embodies the concept of luck, thus being one of the strongest UMAs. They are the "Fourth Master Rule UMA", whose Negator is Fuuko.

=== Justice ===
Justice (ジャスティス, Jasutisu) is a Concept-Type UMA that embodies the concept of justice, thus being one of the strongest UMAs. They are the "Fifth Master Rule UMA", whose Negator is Juiz.

=== War ===
War (ウォー, Wō) is a Concept-Type UMA that embodies the concept of war, thus being one of the strongest UMAs. He is the "Sixth Master Rule UMA".

=== Time ===
Time (タイム, Taimu) is a Concept-Type UMA that embodies the concept of time, thus being one of the strongest UMAs. He is the "Seventh Master Rule UMA". The Negator of Unfade is immune to his abilities.

=== Language ===
Language (ランゲージ, Rangēji) is a Concept-Type UMA that embodies the concept of language, thus being one of the strongest UMAs. She is the "Eighth Master Rule UMA".

=== Beast ===
Beast (ビースト, Bīsuto) is a Concept-Type UMA that embodies the concept of beasts, as in all animals on Earth. He is also known as the "Ninth Master Rule UMA".

=== Sick ===
Sick (シック, Shikku) is a Concept-Type UMA that embodies the concept of sicknesses, thus being one of the strongest UMAs. He is the "Tenth Master Rule UMA".

== UMAs and Artifacts ==
=== Apocalypse ===
Voiced by: Tomokazu Sugita (Japanese); Mick Lauer (English)

Apocalypse (黙示録(アポカリプス), Apokaripusu) is a sentient artifact obtained by the Union. It is a living book situated at the center of the Roundtable, giving the Union quests to complete under the threat of penalties that advance Ragnarok. It has the ability to spawn UMAs as rewards or punishments.

=== Clothes ===
Voiced by: Jun Fukushima (Japanese); Derek Stephen Prince (English)

Clothes (クローゼス, Kurōzesu) is Andy's tamed UMA. He takes the form of clothes that regenerate on Andy's body.

=== Move ===
Voiced by: Shota Yamamoto (Japanese); Bill Butts (English)

Move (ムーブ, Mūbu) is the UMA that embodies movement, who was captured and tamed by The Union and commanded leader of the Union to teleport people.

=== Spoil ===
Voiced by: Nobuo Tobita (Japanese); Bill Butts (English)

Spoil (スポイル, Supoiru) is the Phenomenon-Type UMA that embodies spoiling and decay. He appeared in the rural town Longing and began decaying the citizens, catching the Union's attention and becoming the target of Fuko and Andy's first mission, accompanied by Shen.

=== Autumn ===
Voiced by: Kimiko Saitō (Japanese); Amber Lee Connors (English)

Autumn (オータム, Ōtamu) is the UMA that embodies the season of autumn. Autumn's claws allows it to transform anything into books and reads them as well as has an almost indestructible exoskeleton. It was then defeated by Fuuko, Andy, Rip, Latla, Backs and Akira.

=== Summer ===
Summer (サマー, Samā) is the UMA that embodies the season of summer, who was defeated by Shen, Mui and Feng.

=== Winter ===
Winter (ウインター, Uintā) is the UMA that embodies the season of winter, who was defeated by Burn on behalf of Under.

=== Spring ===
Spring (スプリング, Supuringu) is the UMA that embodies the season spring. Spring is playful and friendly and was close with the first Isshin.

=== Ghost ===
Ghost (ゴースト, Gōsuto) is the UMA that embodies ghosts, who unintentionally saves Fuuko from being killed by Ruin.

=== Gold ===
Gold (ゴールド, Gōrudo) is the UMA that embodies gold, looking like a towering being in gold armor, with a floating ring around its shoulders containing a tattered cape.

=== Platinum ===
Platinum (プラチナ, Purachina) is the UMA that embodies platinum, UMA Gold's "big brother" who is a similarly towering, armored being.

=== Balance ===
Voiced by: Takehito Koyasu (Japanese); Edward Stoneguard^{Ep. 25 credits} (English)

Balance (バランス, Baransu) is the UMA that embodies the concept of balance, which has the appearance of a giant merman with weighing scales on its tail and head. This is an anime-exclusive character.
