= Makima =

Fictional character from Chainsaw Man

- Chainsaw Man character
- Makima as illustrated by Tatsuki Fujimoto
- First appearance: Chainsaw Man chapter 1: Dog & Chainsaw (December 3, 2018)
- Created by: Tatsuki Fujimoto
- Portrayed by: Aya Hirano (stage play)
- Voiced by: Japanese: Tomori Kusunoki; English: Suzie Yeung

In-universe information
- Species: Devil (Control Devil)

Makima (Japanese: マキマ, Hepburn: Makima) is a fictional character from Tatsuki Fujimoto's manga series Chainsaw Man. She is the main antagonist from the Part 1 of the series, the "Public Safety Saga", and is the caretaker of main character Denji, promising him food and shelter if he comes under her care and threatening him with death otherwise. Throughout Part 1, Makima serves as the leader of Public Safety Division 4's Devil Hunters, manipulating the events of the series behind the scenes and revealing more of her true nature as they unfold.

In the anime adaptation, she is voiced by Tomori Kusunoki in Japanese and Suzie Yeung in English. The character was praised by critics and reviewers due to the juxtaposition of her enigmatic nature and horror elements with her soft femininity and nurturing façade. Since the series' debut, Makima has proven to be one of its most iconic and popular characters, making appearances in merchandise and collaborative events.

== Creation ==
Concept designs of Makima (middle/top right) and Aki Hayakawa (left/bottom right, rejected) by Fujimoto

According to series creator Tatsuki Fujimoto, Makima was the first character in Chainsaw Man that he solidly envisioned "both inside and outside", as a figure that represented "domination". Makima was inspired by the character Benten from the novel The Eccentric Family, inheriting her nature as an "unfathomable being" ranked above humans hiding her own "sadness". Makima's name was also a play on the series' premise of chainsaws, being cutting tools; "cutting" the syllable "ki" out of her name would form the word "mama", reflecting protagonist Denji's pursuit of "maternal things". The final fight between Denji and Makima was based on the novel Kizumonogatari between Koyomi Araragi and Kiss-shot Acerola-orion Heart-under-blade.

=== Casting ===
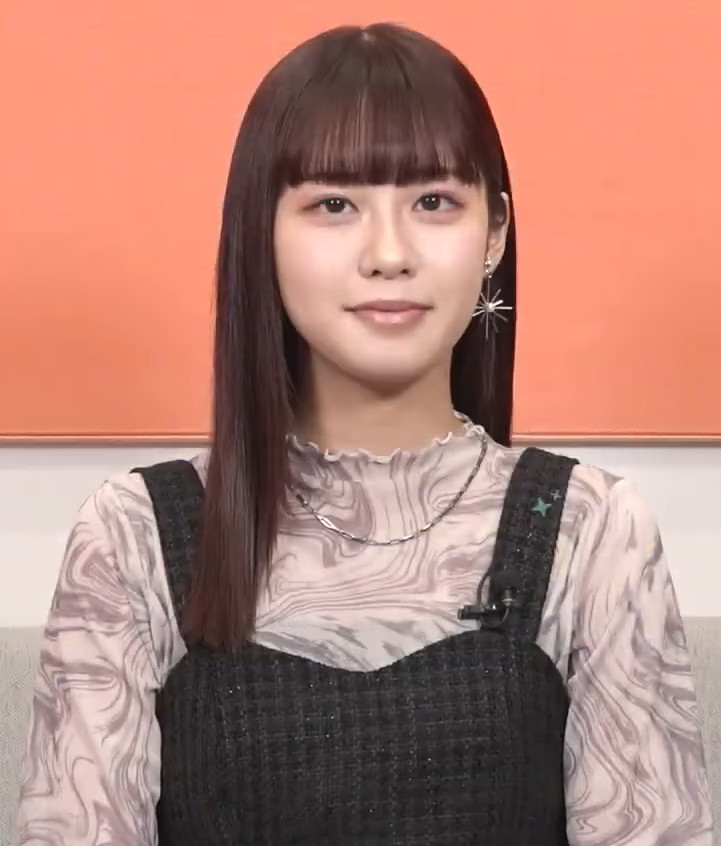
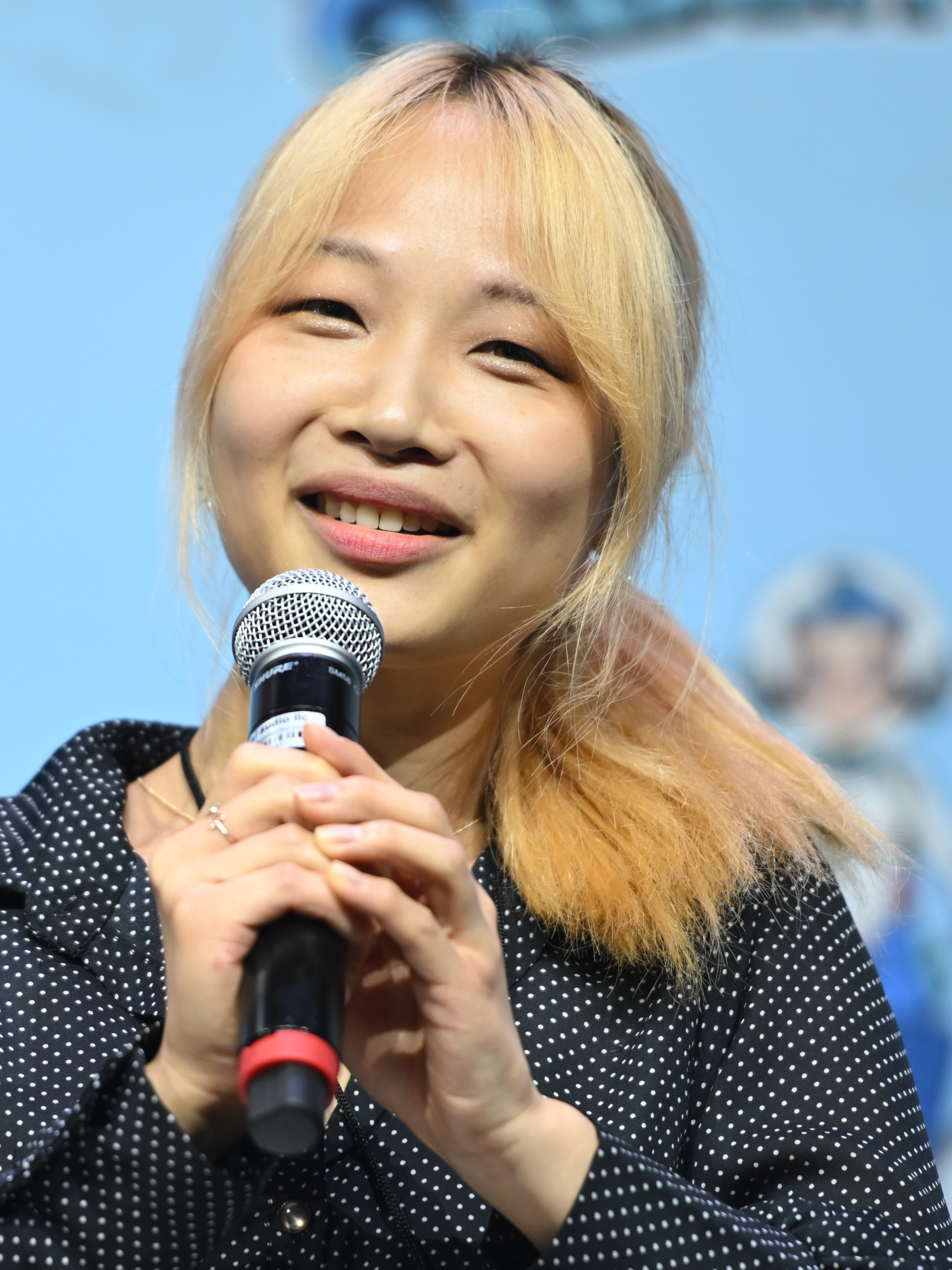
Tomori Kusunoki (left) and Suzie Yeung (right) who voice Makima in Japanese and English, respectively.

Tomori Kusunoki voiced Makima in the original Japanese version of the series. Before being cast in the role, Kusunoki was an avid fan of Makima as she appeared in the manga, even praying to a photo and altar of her during the auditioning process. Kusunoki admired Makima for being an adult who was "never in a hurry" and would leave "room for everything".

For the English-language adaptation, Suzie Yeung voiced the character. In order to familiarize herself with Makima's final motives, Yeung read the Chainsaw Man manga after being cast in the role. Yeung emphasized how Makima "knows a lot more than she lets on" and that the character's motives factored into her performance. She cited Makima as a "very confident character" and conveyed the character's complexities via subtle changes in her voice, describing the process as a "really big balancing act", and explaining that Makima would use these subtle changes in tone and emotion to influence others in her favor. Yeung described her overall approach as "soft" and "disarm[ing]" but with a "threatening" undertone, contrasting Makima's "very specific" and secret motivations and intentions with the easy-to-understand nature of her other roles.

== Appearances ==
Makima is the Control Devil, a being born from humanity's fear of control. She takes the appearance of a young woman with yellow eyes ringed with red concentric circles, and long red hair tied in a single braid. She is usually seen wearing the Public Safety Devil Hunter uniform, resembling that of a security guard. With this appearance, Makima passes herself off as a human contracted to an unknown Devil rather than a Devil in her own right. She uses her intimidating but gentle façade to hide her true nature as a Machiavellian manipulator who desires above all else to control the world and rid it of concepts that she perceives as its "ills". Throughout the series, Makima demonstrates a number of superpowers, including crushing the heads of targets via hand gestures in a telekinetic ritual involving human sacrifices, using rats and crows to spy on enemies, using the finger gun gesture to blast targets akin to an actual gun, and most prominently mind control (albeit only once her true nature is revealed).

Makima appears at the end of the first chapter and first episode of Chainsaw Man, offering main character Denji food and shelter in exchange for his obedience and treating him like a dog, threatening to hunt him down as a Devil if he refuses to comply. Throughout the series, Makima acts as a mentor figure to Denji and teases him with the prospect of romantic and sexual relations, granting him a job as one of her Public Safety Devil Hunters and setting him up with a found family consisting of fellow Devil Hunters Aki Hayakawa and Power. While Makima's morality and goals are kept nebulous for much of the series, she is eventually revealed to be the Control Devil, and the true primary threat faced by Denji. In a ploy to awaken the true Chainsaw Man, which has taken up residence inside Denji as his dog-like companion Pochita, Makima kills the people most important to Denji and destroys his newfound lifestyle to drive him into despair. Despite her best efforts to dominate Chainsaw Man or be consumed by him, Denji and Pochita are able to defeat Makima by the former cooking and eating her body as an act of "love", causing the Control Devil to reincarnate into a new being, Nayuta (Japanese: ナユタ, Hepburn: Nayuta). Later chapters reveal the Control Devil to be one of the setting's Four Horsemen of the Apocalypse, alongside War (Yoru), Famine (Fami), and the then-unrevealed Death.

== Reception and cultural influence ==
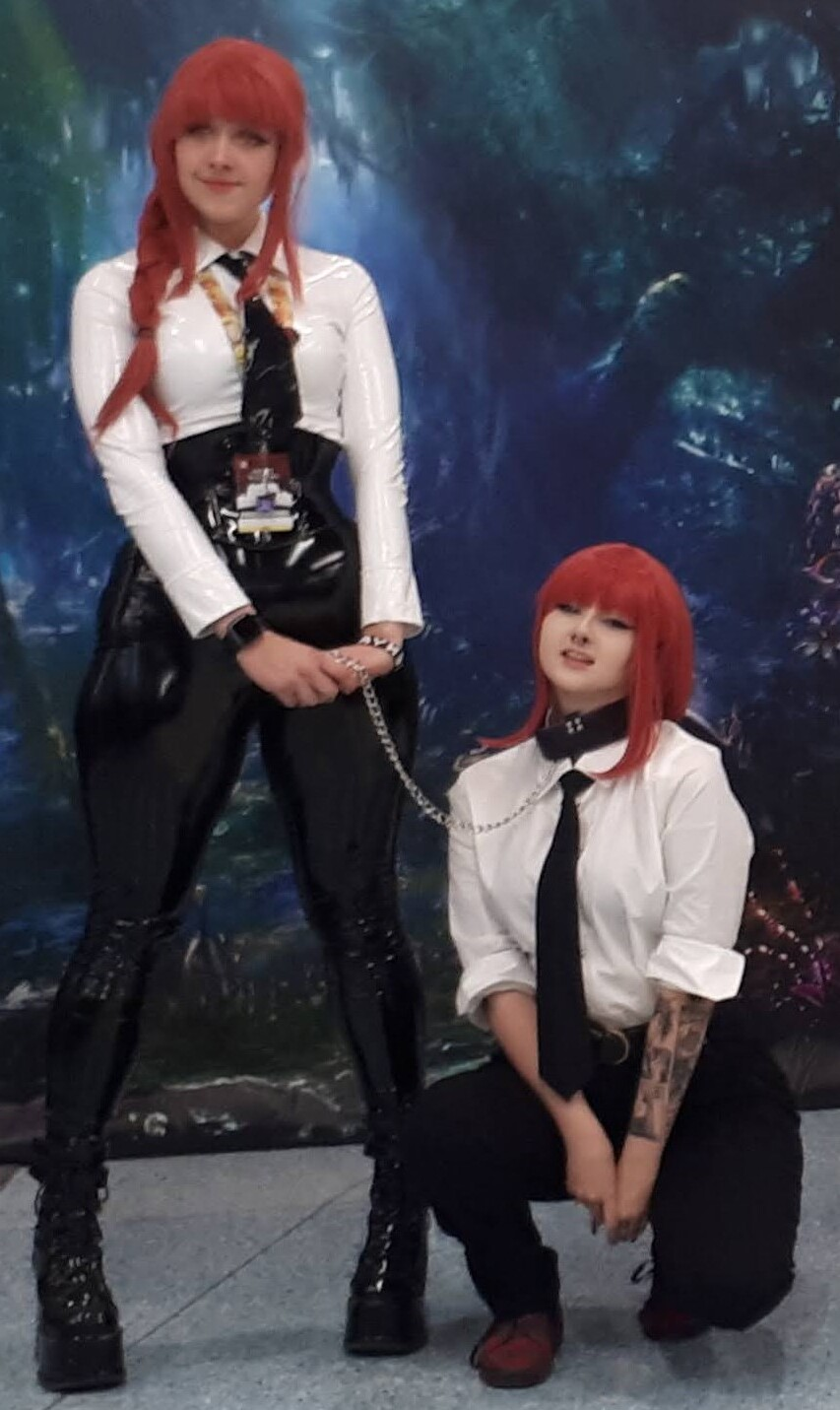
Makima is commonly associated with leashes in the cosplay and fan art scenes, to represent her use of chains as a means of mind control as well as her treatment of others as dogs.

Makima has been positively received by reviewers of the Chainsaw Man manga and anime. Louis Kemner drew attention to Makima's popularity and memorability, stating "she may be a monster, but fans still love her". Kemner juxtaposed Makima's "selfish" goals and actions with the more sympathetic motivations of the series' other characters, and compared and contrasted her relationship with Denji to that of Satoru Gojo and Yuji Itadori in Jujutsu Kaisen, as well as Jiraiya and Naruto Uzumaki in Naruto. Skyler Allen drew attention to Makima's "apparent kindness" towards Denji and contrasted it with the latter's other interactions in the series, highlighting Denji's relationship with Makima as a "truly intimate moment" from his perspective as opposed to the other interactions being "purely transactional", despite the dramatic irony of viewers catching on to Makima's malevolent nature.

Kestrel Swift described Makima as a "beautiful character" with "warmth" that she follows up with "rather sadistic tendencies". Noting her behavior throughout the series, Swift pointed out that the narrative presents Makima as the "greatest force for good" but the only one of the four main characters that couldn't confidently be trusted by the viewer, singling her out as "terrifying", "enigmatic", "fearsome", and a "likely [...] sociopath". Rafael Motomayor praised Makima as "one of the best characters in an already rather phenomenal show", as well as a "clever take on the archetypical female anime character" that stood out due to her sinister and manipulative nature. In particular, Motomayor praised a scene in Episode 9 of the anime where she uses ritualistic hand gestures and human sacrifices to kill the Gun Devil's agents as one of the most "unnerving" and "terrifying" scenes in the series. Swift compared Makima's powers in the same scene to the titular object of Death Note, contrasting her "graceful" hand movements with the "horrific" deaths of her victims. Lawrence Marable from Comic Book Resources, considered Makima as "the best-written female anime villain", and said that "There is no character more terrifying in Chainsaw Man than Makima".

In a popularity poll of the manga, Makima took the second spot, only behind Power. In another poll, she retained her second-place ranking, this time behind Aki Hayakawa. At the 8th Crunchyroll Anime Awards, two of Makima's international voice actors were nominated for the "Best Voice Artist Performance" category, namely Luísa Viotti (Brazilian Portuguese) and Bernadetta Ponticelli (Italian); however, they lost to Léo Rabelo's Satoru Gojo and Mosè Singh's Denji, respectively. Makima appeared in Goddess of Victory: Nikke as part of a Chainsaw Man crossover event with Power and Himeno, the first of many crossovers that would be hosted by the game. Makima has been depicted in Chainsaw Man merchandise, including collectible figurines and clothing. The web series Death Battle depicted a fully-animated fight scene between Makima and Satoru Gojo from Jujutsu Kaisen in a 2023 episode due to both characters' similar positions of power and influence, with Gojo winning the battle.
