= Power (Chainsaw Man) =

Fictional character from Chainsaw Man

- Chainsaw Man character
- Power as illustrated by Tatsuki Fujimoto
- First appearance: Chainsaw Man chapter 4: Power (December 22, 2018)
- Last appearance: Chainsaw Man chapter 232: Thank You, Chainsaw Man (March 25, 2026)
- Created by: Tatsuki Fujimoto
- Voiced by: Japanese: Fairouz Ai; English: Sarah Wiedenheft

In-universe information
- Species: Devil (Blood Fiend)

Power (Japanese: パワー, Hepburn: Pawā) is a fictional character from Tatsuki Fujimoto's manga series Chainsaw Man. She is a Fiend working alongside the main character, Denji, against different enemies.

In the anime adaptation, she is voiced by Fairouz Ai in Japanese and Sarah Wiedenheft in English. The character was highly praised by critics with many considering her a breakout character out of the manga, with many praising the introduction of the character, personality and her relationship with Denji throughout the manga. Her fight scenes and powers throughout the manga and anime adaptation also received praise.

== Creation ==
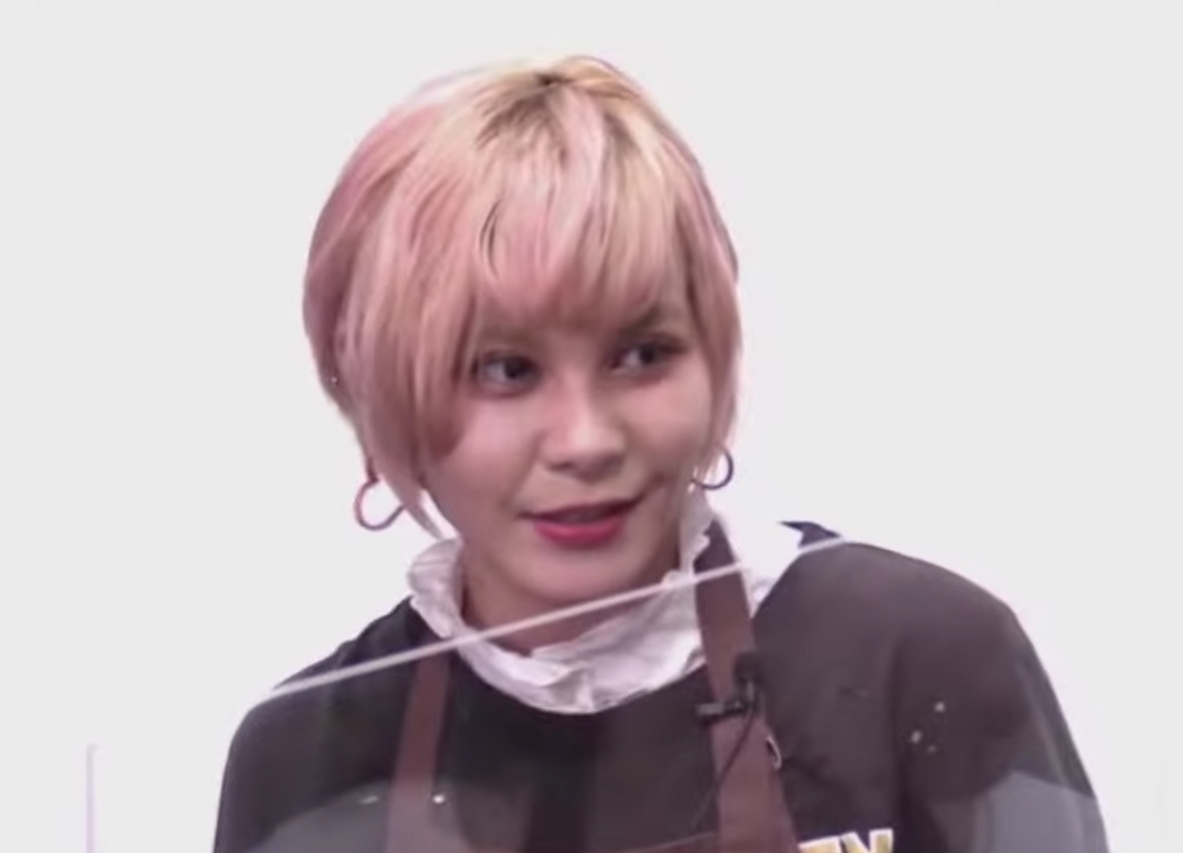
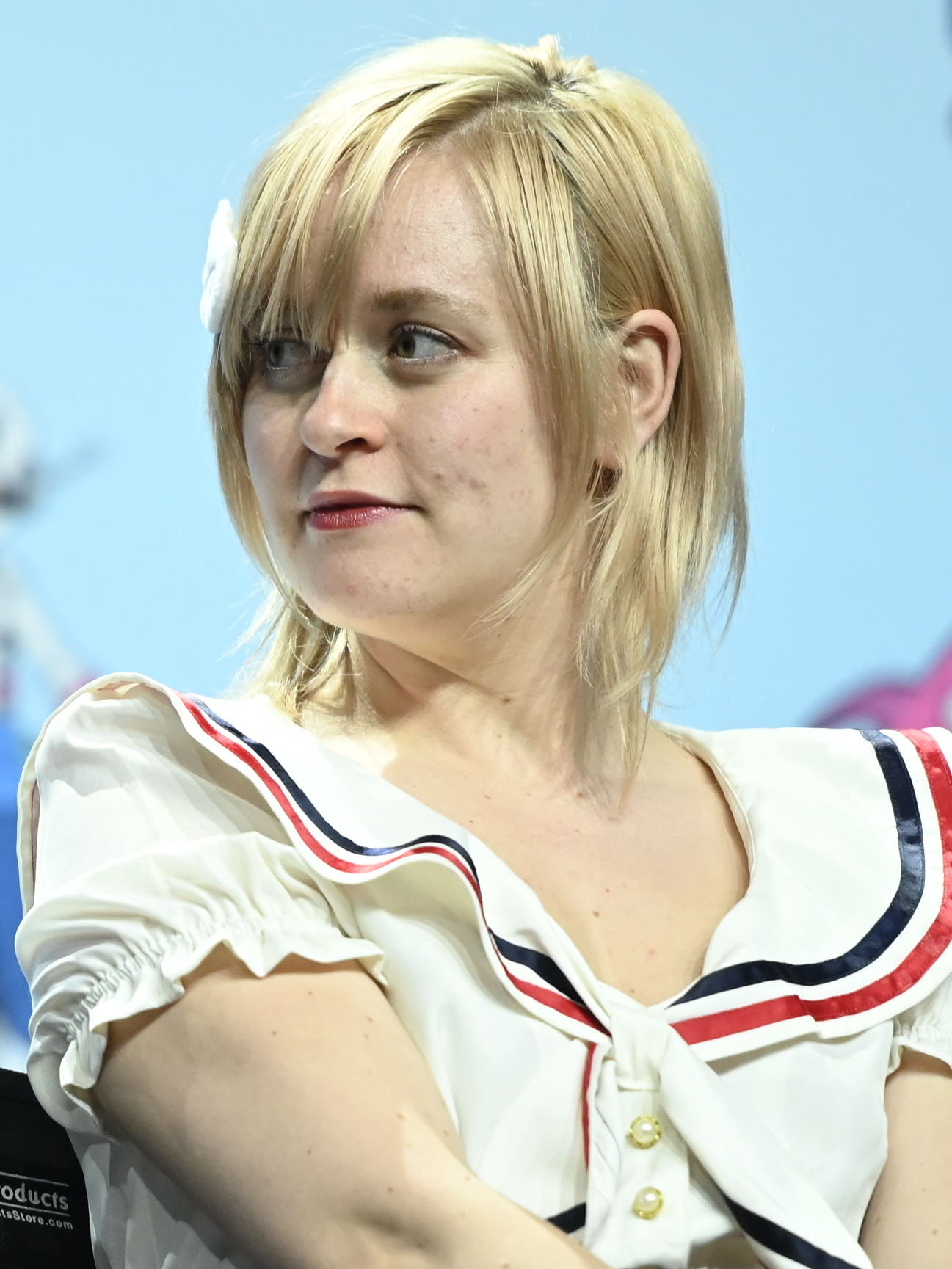
Fairouz Ai (left) and Sarah Wiedenheft (right) who voice Power in Japanese and English, respectively.

Power was inspired by South Park character Eric Cartman as Tatsuki Fujimoto commented it was one of his favorite series. Manabu Otsuka enjoyed the focus on Denji, Aki and Power as Fujimoto was able to highlight the bond the characters form while living together.

Japanese voice actress Fairouz Ai stated that despite the director's intention of Chainsaw Man being turned into a realistic anime adaptation, she tried being faithful to Power's characterization, even though she had no knowledge what Devils do. Power was given a sister-like characterization meant to be charming to the audience. In regards to her interactions with the rest of the protagonists, it was decided to having them talk as first already when they first met.

For the English localization of the series, Sarah Wiedenheft voiced the character. She expressed pressure over voicing Power when being given the role because she had no knowledge of the source material. As she started reading, Wiedenheft was assisted by other staff members. The actress liked Power's design, but had no idea what direction to take with her. She believed Power was a gremlin-like character which was the direction she took. Upon watching the Japanese trailer with the original actor, Wiedenheft liked Ai's performance and decided to emulate her style. Power's energetic personality appealed to the actress and the role in action sequences proved more fun to the actress too.

== Appearances ==
The Blood Fiend and a Public Safety Devil Hunter in Makima's squad. Power looks like a young girl with long hair but is 19 years old; as a Fiend, she has short red horns protruding from her head (like a typical fiend). Power loves violence and is childish, greedy, almost entirely self-motivated, and willing to harm others for her own satisfaction. However, Power is shown to have an unconditional love for her cat, Meowy (ニャーコ, Nyāko), even at one point willing to sacrifice Denji's life to save it. She comes to care deeply for Denji and Aki, her first true friends.

When she, Denji, Aki, and a group of Devil Hunters were teleported to Hell, Power got PTSD afterwards from the resulting encounter with the Darkness Devil. Denji helps her recover, but Aki, possessed by the Gun Devil, attacks them. In the ensuing battle, Denji kills Aki, devastating both him and Power. Later, Power was shot by Makima in front of Denji, to break his spirit. Power revives as the Blood Devil from Denji's blood at Pochita's request to save Denji, but is fatally wounded by Makima again. Before dying, Power makes a contract with Denji — in exchange for her blood, Denji has to find the reborn Blood Devil and turn her back into Power so they may be friends again.

After Pochita erases himself to create a new timeline where he never existed, it is Power who saves Denji from the Zombie Devil and revives him. The two are recruited to Public Safety by Nayuta, and Denji and Power develop the same bond they had in the original timeline.

Outside the Chainsaw Man manga and anime adaptation, Power has appeared in the spin-off light novel Buddy Stories. In a chapter, Power and Denji investigate a recent slate of disappearances at an inn.

== Reception ==
Critics enjoyed the handling of Power. By her introduction, Anime News Network praised her, calling her "best girl" despite how she sets up Denji in her introduction. Anime UK News enjoyed the introduction of Power and her first interactions with Denji as Denji tries to manipulate her to touch her chest which Power accepts, bringing more humor. Her platonic relationship with Denji was praised, for causing a major contrast between other relationships in the series. Due to negative views on Denji's characterization, Polygon believed the series became far more interesting when introducing the characters of Power and Makima. The Fandom Post also enjoyed Power's character for how she allows Denji to touch her chest after her introduction and how comical are the mentions of her excrement when she starts living with Denji and Aki.

Comic Book Resources found it strange how in early chapters of Part 2, Denji rarely recalls Power and the promise the two made in Part 1. Kotaku also praised the dynamic between Power and Denji, while also highlighting how they are related with Aki to the point of calling them "wholesome". Meanwhile, Otaku USA praised the handling of the main trio in early chapters due to the drama the cast endures. The Mary Sue went on to call her the best character in the series. Her brutal training sequences were also well received as another way to bring comedy and keep the leads as antiheroic regardless of the loss of Himeno in the series, contrasting the more relatable Aki. IGN praised how contrasting is Power's personality from the rest of the cast with the most serious one as she is not exaggerated through her comical scenes. The character's role from the light novel Buddy Stories was praised by Anime News Network for her comical traits and her chemistry with Denji.

In a popularity poll of the manga, Power took the first spot. In another poll, she took third place behind Aki Hayakawa and Makima. Christopher Farris from Anime News Network listed Power as his favorite female character from 2022, praising her dynamic with Denji and the portrayal given by Ai Fairouz. Power also appeared in the crossover from Goddess of Victory: Nikke representing Chainsaw Man with Makima and Himeno. A figurine of Power was also made by MAPPA. At the 8th Crunchyroll Anime Awards, Power was nominated for "Best Supporting Character". Three of Power's international voice actors were nominated for the "Best Voice Artist Performance" category, namely María Luisa Marciel (Castilian), Zina Khakhoulia (French), and Franziska Trunte (German); the latter won the award, while Marciel and Khakhoulia lost to Joel Gómez Jimenez's Denji and Martial Le Minoux's Suguru Geto, respectively.
