= Ado's Best Adobum =

2025 greatest hits album by Ado

- Standard edition cover

Greatest hits album by Ado
- Released: April 8, 2025
- Recorded: 2020–2024
- Length: 149:41
- Language: Japanese
- Label: Virgin

Ado chronology
Zanmu (2024)	Ado's Best Adobum (2025)

Alternative cover
- "Kigeki" edition cover

Singles from Ado's Best Adobum
- 1. "Shoka" Released: October 14, 2024; 2. "Sakura Biyori and Time Machine" Released: October 24, 2024; 3. "Episode X" Released: December 6, 2024; 4. "Elf" Released: January 24, 2025; 5. "Bouquet for Me" Released: March 9, 2025

Ado's Best Adobum (Adoのベストアドバム, Ado no Besuto Adobamu) (Note: A pun on the word "album" (Japanese: アルバム, romanized: Arubamu).) is the first greatest hits album by Japanese singer Ado. It was released digitally via Virgin Music on April 8, 2025, and physically the next day. Announced in early January, the album includes songs from her first and second studio albums, Kyōgen (2022) and Zanmu (2024), alongside songs from her soundtrack album Uta's Songs: One Piece Film Red (2022) and her cover album Ado's Utattemita Album (2023).

== Background ==
Ado released her second studio album Zanmu in July 2024. Similar to her debut album Kyōgen (2022), Zanmu debuted at number one on various Japanese charts. Following the end of Ado's Japan tour Mona Lisa Profile, she released her first double A-side single "Sakura Biyori and Time Machine" featuring Vocaloid Hatsune Miku and "Shoka". Within that month, Ado announced her second world tour, the Hibana Tour.

In January 2025, Ado's management team posted a teaser hinting at Ado's 5th anniversary since debuting as an artist. Hours later, her team revealed Ado's first greatest hits album.

== Cover artwork ==
Artwork for the album cover was handled by Orihara, who has designed Ado's previous album covers. The standard, limited Kigeki and box set edition each have different cover art.

== Release and promotion ==
Released on April 8, 2025, a day earlier than the originally announced release date, six versions of Ado's Best Adobum was announced by Universal Music Japan. The "Kigeki" Edition (『喜劇』盤, "Kigeki"-ban; lit. "Comedy" Edition) edition includes a Blu-ray or DVD of Ado's debut concert at Zepp DiverCity Tokyo Plaza on April 4, 2022. The limited Deluxe Box Edition combines the "Kigeki" Edition with bonus goods. First press goods for all six of the versions include a trading card while additional bonus goods vary from additional shops. The album is marketed by the slogan "All hits, no misses".

== Track listing ==
Ado's Best Adobum – disc one
No.	Title	Writer(s)	Producer(s)	Length
1.	"Usseewa" (うっせぇわ)	Syudou	Syudou	3:26
2.	"Ashura-chan" (阿修羅ちゃん)	Neru	Neru	3:17
3.	"Yoru no Pierrot" (夜のピエロ)	Biz	Biz	3:20
4.	"Kura Kura" (クラクラ)	Meiyo	Meiyo; Yoko Kanno	3:13
5.	"Chocolat Cadabra" (ショコラカタブラ)	Camellia; Taku Inoue	Taku Inoue	3:07
6.	"Unravel"	TK	TK	3:58
7.	"I'm Invincible" (私は最強)	Motoki Ohmori	Mrs. Green Apple	4:18
8.	"Fleeting Lullaby" (ウタカタララバイ)	Tophamhat-Kyo; Fake Type.	Fake Type.	2:55
9.	"Motherland" (マザーランド)	Nilfruits	Nilfruits	4:21
10.	"Himawari" (向日葵)	Mewhan	Mewhan	4:21
11.	"New Genesis" (新時代)	Yasutaka Nakata	Yasutaka Nakata	3:48
12.	"Gira Gira" (ギラギラ)	Teniwoha	Teniwoha	4:36
13.	"Rule" (ルル)	Maretu	Maretu	3:20
14.	"Episode X"	Ayase	Ayase	3:24
15.	"Freedom"	Jon-Yakitory	Jon-Yakitory	3:06
16.	"Rockstar" (ロックスター)	Jon-Yakitory	Jon-Yakitory	3:43
17.	"Show" (唱)	Tophamhat-Kyo; Giga; TeddyLoid	Giga	3:13
18.	"Ibara" (いばら)	Vaundy	Vaundy	4:21
19.	"Value"	Police Piccadilly	Police Piccadilly	3:06
20.	"Kokoro to Iu Na no Fukakai" (心という名の不可解)	Mafumafu	Mafumafu	4:30
Total length:				73:17

Ado's Best Adobum – disc two
No.	Title	Writer(s)	Producer(s)	Length
1.	"Shoka" (初夏)	Ado	Gen Okamura	3:49
2.	"Hello Signals"	Ine	Ine	3:18
3.	"Backlight" (逆光)	Vaundy	Vaundy	3:58
4.	"Rebellion" (リベリオン)	Chinozo	Chinozo	2:59
5.	"Mirror"	Natori	Natori	3:00
6.	"I'm a Controversy" (アタシは問題作)	PinnochioP	PinnochioP	3:17
7.	"Missing" (行方知れず)	Ringo Sheena	Ringo Sheena	3:13
8.	"Aishite Aishite Aishite" (愛して愛して愛して)	Kikuo	Kikuo	4:18
9.	"Tot Musica"	Hiroyuki Sawano	Hiroyuki Sawano	3:13
10.	"Dignity"	Koshi Inaba	Tak Matsumoto	4:13
11.	"Aitakute" (会いたくて)	Mewhan	MikitoP; Mewhan	4:54
12.	"Elf" (エルフ)	Teniwoha	Teniwoha	4:24
13.	"Eien no Akuruhi" (永遠のあくる日)	Teniwoha	Teniwoha	4:07
14.	"Readymade" (レディメイド)	P-Surii	P-Surii	4:04
15.	"Lucky Bruto" (ラッキー・ブルート)	Hiiragi Kirai	Hiiragi Kirai	3:30
16.	"Kagakushu" (過学習)	Ine	Ine	3:36
17.	"All Night Radio" (オールナイトレディオ)	Mitchie M	Mitchie M	3:35
18.	"Bouquet for Me" (わたしに花束)	Gom; Shito	HoneyWorks	3:49
19.	"Odo" (踊)	Deco*27	Giga; TeddyLoid	3:32
20.	"Sakura Biyori and Time Machine (with Hatsune Miku)" (桜日和とタイムマシン)	Mafumafu	Mafumafu	5:31
Total length:				76:15

Ado's Best Adobum – limited edition DVD / Blu-ray bonus live performances from the Kigeki live show
No.	Title	Writer(s)	Length
1.	"Lucky Bruto"	Kirai	3:37
2.	"Domestic de Violence" (ドメスティックでバイオレンス)	Kanaria	2:45
3.	"Gira Gira"	Teniwoha	4:41
4.	"Fireworks" (花火)	Whale Don't Sleep	3:38
5.	"Yoru no Pierrot"	Biz	3:24
6.	"Ashura-chan"	Neru	3:24
7.	"Freedom"	Jon-Yakitory	3:10
8.	"Aitakute"	Mewhan	4:57
9.	"Basket Worm" (バスケットワーム)	Napoli-P	4:16
10.	"Readymade"	P-Surii	4:09
11.	"Kagakushu"	Ine	3:49
12.	"Motherland"	Nilfruits	4:37
13.	"Odo"	Terayama	3:35
14.	"Usseewa"	Syudou	3:29
15.	"Jama" (邪魔)	Syudou	3:39
16.	"Kokoro to Iu Na no Fukakai"	Mafumafu	5:04
Total length:			219:40

== Charts ==
=== Weekly charts ===
Weekly chart performance for Ado's Best Adobum
Chart (2025)	Peak position
French Albums (SNEP)	133
Japanese Albums (Oricon)	1
Japanese Combined Albums (Oricon)	1
Japanese Hot Albums (Billboard Japan)	2
US World Albums (Billboard)	9

=== Monthly charts ===
Monthly chart performance for Ado's Best Adobum
Chart (2025)	Position
Japanese Albums (Oricon)	2

=== Year-end charts ===
Year-end chart performance for Ado's Best Adobum
Chart (2025)	Position
Japanese Albums (Oricon)	37
Japanese Digital Albums (Oricon)	6
Japanese Download Albums (Billboard Japan)	5
Japanese Top Albums Sales (Billboard Japan)	37

== Certifications ==
Certifications for Ado's Best Adobum
Region	Certification	Certified units/sales
Japan (RIAJ) Physical	Platinum	250,000^{^}
^{^} Shipments figures based on certification alone.

== Release history ==
Release history and formats for Ado's Best Adobum
Region	Date	Format(s)	Version	Label	Ref.
Various	April 8, 2025	Digital download; streaming	Standard	Virgin; Universal	
Japan	April 9, 2025	CD	Standard	Virgin; Universal Japan	
Japan	April 9, 2025	CD; DVD	Kigeki	Virgin; Universal Japan	
Japan	April 9, 2025	CD; Blu-ray	Kigeki	Virgin; Universal Japan	
Japan	April 9, 2025	CD; DVD	Shaka Shaka	Virgin; Universal Japan	
Japan	April 9, 2025	CD; DVD	Deluxe Box Set	Virgin; Universal Japan	
Japan	April 9, 2025	CD; Blu-ray	Deluxe Box Set	Virgin; Universal Japan	
Japan	July 30, 2025	Vinyl	Vol. 1	Virgin; Universal Japan	
Japan	July 30, 2025	Vinyl	Vol. 2	Virgin; Universal Japan	
