= Hibana World Tour =

2025 concert tour by Ado

- Tour by Ado
- Promotional poster
- Location: Asia; North America; Europe; Oceania; Latin America
- Associated albums: All of Ado's albums (Note: Two studio albums, one soundtrack album, and two compilation albums)
- Start date: April 26, 2025
- End date: August 24, 2025
- No. of shows: 34

Ado concert chronology
- Profile of Mona Lisa (2024); Hibana World Tour (2025); Yodaka Dome Tour (2025)

The Hibana World Tour (Note: Officially titled Ado - World Tour 2025 "Hibana", spelled in Latin script; "Hibana" (火花) means 'spark' in Japanese.) was the second world tour by Japanese singer Ado, following her Profile of Mona Lisa Tour in Japan and the Wish World Tour. The tour began on April 26, 2025, at Saitama Super Arena in Japan and concluded on August 24, 2025, in Honolulu, Hawaii.

== Background ==
Ado held her first world tour, the Wish World Tour, in 2024 with venues in Europe and the Americas. Following the tour, she released her second studio album, Zanmu. Ado embarked on her first Japanese arena tour, the Profile of Mona Lisa, in promotion of the album. Shortly after the completion of the Profile of Mona Lisa tour, Ado held a livestream on YouTube celebrating her birthday on October 24. During the livestream, she announced her second world tour, the Hibana World Tour.

The tour began in Japan at the Saitama Super Arena in Chūō-ku, Saitama.

== Impact ==
Estimated to draw over 500,000 attendees in total, the Hibana World Tour has been credited as the largest global tour by a Japanese artist. Ado became the first Japanese artist to sell out 13 venues, including the largest indoor arena in France, the Accor Arena in Paris, which holds 20,000 people.

== Set list ==
This set list is from the May 8, 2025 concert at SM Mall of Asia Arena in Manila. It does not represent all concerts for the duration of the tour.

1. "Usseewa"
2. "Lucky Bruto"
3. "Gira Gira"
4. "Show"
5. "Kura Kura"
6. "Readymade"
7. "Mirror"
8. "Charles"
9. "Elf"
10. "Value"
11. "Stay Gold"
12. "Rule"
13. "Fleeting Lullaby"
14. "Aishite Aishite Aishite"
15. "Backlight"
16. "Hibana (Reloaded)"
17. "Episode X"
18. "Odo"

=== Encore ===
1. "Rockstar"
2. "Chandelier"
3. "New Genesis"

=== Notes ===
- During her first stop at Saitama, she covered Teniwoha song "Zanelli". She also performed "Bouquet for Me" live for the first time during the encore.
- During her Seoul concert, she covered "Villain" by Stella Jang during the encore.

== Tour dates ==
List of 2025 concerts, showing date, city, country, venue, and attendance
Date	City	Country	Venue	Attendance
April 26	Saitama	Japan	Saitama Super Arena	—
April 27	Saitama	Japan	Saitama Super Arena	—
May 4	Pak Kret (Note: Promoted as Bangkok)	Thailand	Impact Exhibition Hall 5-6	—
May 8	Pasay (Note: Promoted as Manila)	Philippines	SM Mall of Asia Arena	—
May 11	Taoyuan (Note: Promoted as Taipei)	Taiwan	NTSU Arena	—
May 15	Goyang (Note: Promoted as Seoul)	South Korea	KINTEX Hall 9	—
May 18	Hong Kong	China	AsiaWorld–Arena	—
May 21	Singapore		Singapore Indoor Stadium	—
May 25	Sydney	Australia	Qudos Bank Arena	—
May 27	Melbourne	Australia	Rod Laver Arena	—
June 10	Antwerp	Belgium	Sportpaleis	—
June 14	Copenhagen	Denmark	Royal Arena	—
June 17	Berlin	Germany	Uber Arena	—
June 19	London	England	The O2 Arena	—
June 21	Amsterdam	Netherlands	Ziggo Dome	—
June 25	Paris	France	Accor Arena	—
June 29	Barcelona	Spain	Palau Sant Jordi	—
July 2	Assago (Note: Promoted as Milan)	Italy	Unipol Forum	—
July 10	Tacoma (Note: Promoted as Seattle)	United States	Tacoma Dome	—
July 13	San Jose	United States	SAP Center	—
July 16	Los Angeles	United States	Crypto.com Arena	—
July 19	Phoenix	United States	PHX Arena	—
July 22	Fort Worth	United States	Dickies Arena	—
July 24	Duluth	United States	Gas South Arena	—
July 26	Orlando	United States	Kia Center	—
July 29	Baltimore	United States	CFG Bank Arena	—
July 31	Chicago	United States	United Center	—
August 3	Toronto	Canada	Scotiabank Arena	—
August 5	Newark	United States	Prudential Center	—
August 8	Mexico City	Mexico	Arena Ciudad de México	—
August 13	São Paulo	Brazil	Espaço Unimed	—
August 15	Buenos Aires	Argentina	Movistar Arena	—
August 18	Santiago	Chile	Movistar Arena	—
August 24	Honolulu	United States	Blaisdell Arena	—
Total				N/A
