= Zanmu =

2024 studio album by Ado

- Standard edition cover

Studio album by Ado
- Released: July 10, 2024
- Length: 54:59
- Language: Japanese
- Label: Virgin
- Producers: Teniwoha; Ringo Sheena; Chinozo; PinocchioP; Vaundy; 40mP; Mewhan; Giga; TeddyLoid; Tak Matsumoto; Meiyo; Yoko Kanno; Mitchie M; Taku Inoue; Police Piccadilly; Natori; Maretu; Yunosuke; Sheeno Mirin

Ado chronology
Ado's Utattemita Album (2023)	Zanmu (2024)	Ado's Best Adobum (2025)

Singles from Zanmu
- 1. "Eien no Akuruhi" Released: March 14, 2022; 2. "Rebellion" Released: September 19, 2022; 3. "Missing" Released: October 10, 2022; 4. "I'm a Controversy" Released: February 20, 2023; 5. "Ibara" Released: May 9, 2023; 6. "Himawari" Released: July 11, 2023; 7. "Show" Released: September 6, 2023; 8. "Dignity" Released: September 18, 2023; 9. "Kura Kura" Released: October 5, 2023; 10. "All Night Radio" Released: October 14, 2023; 11. "Chocolat Cadabra" Released: January 31, 2024; 12. "Value" Released: February 23, 2024; 13. "Mirror" Released: May 31, 2024; 14. "Rule" Released: July 5, 2024

Zanmu (残夢; lit. "unfulfilled dreams") is the second studio album by Japanese singer Ado, released on July 10, 2024, via Virgin Music. Announced on April 20, the album was preceded by the release of fourteen singles, including "Show", which was used by Universal Studios Japan to promote their Halloween Horror Nights attraction, and "Kura Kura", the theme song for season 2 of Spy × Family.

== Background ==
In 2022, Ado released her debut studio album, Kyōgen, which went to debut atop both the Oricon Albums Chart and the Billboard Japan Hot Albums chart. The album broke a string of records, including becoming the first to sell over 100,000 copies in its first week by a female artist since Superfly's 2008 self titled debut studio album. Later that year, Ado provided singing vocals for Uta for the Japanese animated musical fantasy film One Piece Film: Red. The accompanying soundtrack album Uta's Songs: One Piece Film Red became an international success, charting in various countries and breaking records on the Japan Hot 100. In 2023, Ado released multiple singles, alongside a compilation album of cover recordings, Ado's Utattemita Album.

On April 20, 2024, Universal Music Japan announced Ado's second studio album. Multiple variants of the album will be released, which will contain bonus bundles while the limited edition will include footage of her Los Angeles performance from her first world tour, the Wish tour.

== Promotion ==
Various songs included on the album were used in commercial tie-ins or as theme songs for Japanese films. "Missing", which was written by Ringo Sheena, served as the theme song for Karada Sakari while "Dignity" served as the theme song for the live-action adaption of The Silent Service and "Chocolat Cadabra", which was used by Lotte Wellfood for their 60th anniversary commercial.

In promotion of Zanmu, Ado embarked on her first Japanese arena tour, the Profile of Mona Lisa tour. The tour began on July 14 and concluded on October 13, 2024.

== Track listing ==
Zanmu track listing
No.	Title	Writer(s)	Producer(s)	Length
1.	"Nukegara" (抜け空)	Yunosuke; Gyuniku	Yunosuke	3:08
2.	"Missing" (行方知れず)	Ringo Sheena	Sheena	3:13
3.	"Dignity"	Tak Matsumoto; Koshi Inaba	Matsumoto	4:12
4.	"Chocolat Cadabra" (ショコラカタブラ)	Taku Inoue; Camellia	Inoue	3:04
5.	"Kura Kura" (クラクラ)	Meiyo	Meiyo; Yoko Kanno	3:11
6.	"I'm a Controversy" (アタシは問題作)	PinocchioP	PinocchioP	3:14
7.	"Rebellion" (リベリオン)	Chinozo	Chinozo	2:58
8.	"All Night Radio" (オールナイトレディオ)	Mitchie M	Mitchie M	3:32
9.	"Himawari" (向日葵)	Mewhan	40mp; Mewhan	4:19
10.	"Eien no Akuruhi" (永遠のあくる日)	Teniwoha	Teniwoha	4:06
11.	"Mirror"	Natori	Natori	3:00
12.	"Rule" (ルル)	Maretu	Maretu	3:07
13.	"Show" (唱)	Giga; TeddyLoid; Tophamhat-Kyo	Giga; TeddyLoid	3:12
14.	"Ibara" (いばら)	Vaundy	Vaundy	4:22
15.	"Value"	Police Piccadilly	Police Piccadilly	3:04
16.	"0"	Sheeno Mirin	Mirin	3:00
Total length:				54:59

Zanmu – limited edition DVD / Blu-ray bonus live performances from the Wish Tour in Los Angeles
No.	Title	Writer(s)	Length
1.	"New Genesis"	Yasutaka Nakata
2.	"Usseewa"	Syudou
3.	"Lucky Bruto"	Hiiragi Kirai
4.	"Readymade"	Three
5.	"Rebellion"	Chinozo
6.	"Fleeting Lullaby"	Tophamhat-Kyo
7.	"Motherland"	Nilfruits
8.	"Gira Gira"	Teniwoha
9.	"Tot Musica"	Canon; Hiroyuki Sawano
10.	"Aishite Aishite Aishite"	Kikuo
11.	"I'm Invincible"	Motoki Ohmori
12.	"Ashura-chan"	Neru
13.	"Kura Kura"	Meiyo
14.	"Yoru no Pierrot" (TeddyLoid remix)	Biz
15.	"Kokoro to iu Na no Fukakai"	Mafumafu
16.	"Mayonaka no Door"	Tetsuji Hayashi; Yoshiko Miura
17.	"Show"	Giga; TeddyLoid; Tophamhat-Kyo
18.	"Backlight" (encore)	Vaundy
19.	"Freedom" (encore)	Jon-Yakitory
20.	"Senbonzakura" (encore)	Kurousa-P
21.	"Odo" (encore)	Giga; TeddyLoid; Deco*27

Notes

- "Dignity" and "Mirror", named in English, are stylized in uppercase.
- "行方知れず" ("Missing"), when presented in English, is stylized in lowercase.
- "ルル" ("Rule"), when presented in English, is stylized as "RuLe".

== Personnel ==
Musicians

- Ado – vocals
- Keisuke Torigoe – bass on "Missing"
- Ringo Sheena – computer music systems on "Missing"
- Atsushi Matsushita – drums on "Missing"
- Yukio Nagoshi – guitar on "Missing"
- Ichiyo Izawa – keyboards on "Missing"
- Seiji Kameda – bass on "Dignity"
- Hideo Yamaki – drums on "Dignity"
- Takahiro Matsumoto – guitar on "Dignity"
- Yuto Saito – piano on "Dignity"
- Hitoshi Konno Strings – strings on "Dignity"
- Masato Honda – alto saxophone on "Kura Kura"
- Takuo Yamamoto – baritone saxophone and tenor saxophone on "Kura Kura"
- Yasuo Sano – drums on "Kura Kura"
- Takafumi "CO-K" Kokei – guitar on "Kura Kura"
- Andy Wulf – tenor saxophone on "Kura Kura"
- Shinsuke Torizuka – trombone on "Kura Kura"
- Yoichi Murata – trombone on "Kura Kura"
- Koji Nishimura – trumpet on "Kura Kura"
- Sho Okumura – trumpet on "Kura Kura"
- Kei Nakamura – bass on "Himawari"
- Test – guitar on "Himawari"
- JimuinG – keyboards on "Himawari"
- 40mp – programming on "Himawari"
- Yu Manabe Strings – strings on "Himawari"
- Leon Nishizuki – bass on "Mirror"
- Haruno – drum programming on "Mirror"
- Natori – drum programming on "Mirror"
- Merlyn Kelly – bass on "Ibara"
- Bobo – drums on "Ibara"
- Taiking – guitar on "Ibara"

Technical

- Vis – mixing on "Nukegara" and "All Night Radio"
- Uni Inoue – mixing and engineering on "Missing"
- Hiroyuki Kobayashi – mixing and engineering on "Dignity"
- Masashi Uramoto – mixing on "Chocolat Cadabra"
- Tom Manning – mixing on "Kura Kura"
- Naoki Itai – mixing on "I'm a Controversy", "Rebellion", "Himawari", "Eien No Akuruhi", "Rule", "Value", and "0"
- Maretu – mixing and recording arrangement on "Rule"
- Norikatsu Teruuchi – mixing, engineering on "Ibara"
- Tsubasa Yamazaki – mastering on "Dignity"
- Matt Colton – mastering on "Kura Kura"
- Masashi Yabuhara – engineering on "Kura Kura"
- Yunosuke – recording arrangement on "Nukegara"
- Ringo Sheena – recording arrangement on "Missing"
- Seiji Kameda – recording arrangement on "Dignity"
- Taku Inoue – recording arrangement on "Chocolat Cadabra"
- Seatbelts – recording arrangement on "Kura Kura"
- Yoko Kanno – recording arrangement on "Kura Kura"
- PinocchioP – recording arrangement on "I'm a Controversy"
- Chinozo – recording arrangement on "Rebellion"
- Mitchie M – recording arrangement on "All Night Radio"
- 40mp – recording arrangement on "Himawari"
- Teniwoha – recording arrangement on "Eien No Akuruhi"
- Natori – recording arrangement on "Rule"
- Giga – recording arrangement on "Show"
- TeddyLoid – recording arrangement on "Show"
- Vaundy – recording arrangement on "Ibara"
- Police Piccadilly – recording arrangement on "Value"
- Sheeno Mirin – recording arrangement on "0"
- Haruki Doi – additional engineering on "Missing"

== Charts ==
=== Weekly charts ===
Weekly chart performance for Zanmu
Chart (2024)	Peak position
Japanese Albums (Oricon)	1
Japanese Combined Albums (Oricon)	1
Japanese Hot Albums (Billboard Japan)	1

=== Monthly charts ===
Monthly chart performance for Zanmu
Chart (2024)	Position
Japanese Albums (Oricon)	6

=== Year-end charts ===
Year-end chart performance for Zanmu
Chart (2024)	Position
Japanese Albums (Oricon)	29
Japanese Digital Albums (Oricon)	8
Japanese Hot Albums (Billboard Japan)	23

== Certifications ==
Certifications for Zanmu
Region	Certification	Certified units/sales
Japan (RIAJ)	Gold	100,000^{^}
^{^} Shipments figures based on certification alone.

== Release history ==
Release history and formats for Zanmu
Region	Date	Format(s)	Version	Label	Ref.
Various	July 10, 2024	Digital download; streaming	Standard	Virgin; Universal	
Japan	July 10, 2024	CD	Standard	Virgin; Universal Japan	
Japan	July 10, 2024	CD; DVD	Limited	Virgin; Universal Japan	
Japan	July 10, 2024	CD; Blu-ray	Limited	Virgin; Universal Japan	
Japan	July 10, 2024	CD	Yura Yura Kira Kira	Virgin; Universal Japan	
Japan	July 10, 2024	CD	Rubber Coaster	Virgin; Universal Japan	
Japan	July 10, 2024	CD; Blu-ray	Limited Big Acrylic Stand	Virgin; Universal Japan	
Various	July 19, 2024	CD; DVD	Limited	Universal	
Various	July 19, 2024	CD; Blu-ray	Limited	Universal	
Various	July 19, 2024	CD	Yura Yura Kira Kira	Universal	
