= Kura Kura =

Kura Kura may refer to

- "Kura Kura" (Ado song), 2023
- "Kura Kura" (Twice song), 2021
- Kura Kura (manga), a manga by Dengeki Comics
- Kura-kura, a species of grass
