= All Night Radio =

All Night Radio may refer to:

- All Night Radio (band), a Los Angeles indie rock band active 2002–2004
- "All Night Radio" (song), a 2023 song from Zanmu by Ado
