= Show (song) =

Single by Ado

from the album Zanmu
- Language: Japanese; English
- Released: September 6, 2023
- Genre: EDM
- Length: 3:09
- Label: Virgin
- Composers: Giga; TeddyLoid
- Lyricist: Tophamhat-Kyo
- Producers: Giga; TeddyLoid

Ado singles chronology
"Unforgiven" (Japanese version) (2023)	"Show" (2023)	"Dignity" (2023)

Music video
- "Show" on YouTube

"Show" (Japanese: 唱, Hepburn: Shō; lit. "chant") is a song recorded by Japanese singer Ado, released on September 6, 2023, by Virgin Music. Composed and produced by Giga and TeddyLoid with lyrics written by Tophamhat-Kyo, the song was used by Universal Studios Japan to promote their Halloween event, Halloween Horror Nights.

== Background ==
Ado has previously recorded songs written by Tophamhat-Kyo, notably "Fleeting Lullaby" from the soundtrack album Uta's Songs: One Piece Film Red. Producer Giga and TeddyLoid also have produced songs from her debut studio album, Kyōgen.

On August 29, 2023, "Show" was announced to be a collaboration song with Universal Studios Japan as the theme song for the dance show Zombie de Dance. The song was further used in ride attractions at Universal Studios Japan during the month of October.

A remix version of the song by British DJ and producer Jax Jones was digitally released on December 31, 2023.

== Composition ==
"Show" has been described as an EDM song with "exotic Bollywood beats".

== Commercial performance ==
"Show" debuted at number 8 on the Billboard Japan Hot 100 for the week of September 13. On its second week, the song rose to number 3 before peaking at number one within its third week on the chart. "Show" became Ado's third number one song after "Usseewa" and "New Genesis".

On the Oricon charts, "Show" topped both the Digital Singles and Streaming charts.

Within eight weeks of release, the song amassed over 100 million streams.

== Music video ==
A music video was illustrated by Yasutatsu, who also designed the single cover artwork for "Show". Yasutatsu previously illustrated music videos and cover artwork for Ado's "Readymade" and "Motherland". Billboard Japan described the music video as an "undead dance number in a fun pop style."

== Accolades ==
Awards and nominations for "Show"
Year	Award	Category	Result	Ref.
2023	Japan Record Awards	Excellent Work Awards	Won	
2025	Music Awards Japan	Best Japanese Dance Pop Song	Nominated	
2025	JASRAC Awards	Bronze Prize	Won	

== Track listing ==
- Digital download and streaming – Show LP
1. "Show" (唱) – 3:09
2. "Show" (TeddyLoid remix)
3. "Show" (Jax Jones remix) – 2:34
4. "Show" (live / the First World Tour "Wish" Los Angeles)
5. "Show" (sped up)
6. "Show" (slowed down)
7. "Show" (stripped)
8. "Show" (instrumental)
9. "Show" (a cappella)
10. "Show" (Jax Jones remix / extended mix) – 4:25

== Charts ==
=== Weekly charts ===
Weekly chart performance for "Show"
Chart (2023)	Peak position
Global 200 (Billboard)	44
Japan (Japan Hot 100)	1
Japan Combined Singles (Oricon)	1

Weekly chart performance for Show LP
Chart (2024)	Peak position
Japanese Digital Albums (Oricon)	7
Japanese Hot Albums (Billboard Japan)	36

=== Year-end charts ===
2023 year-end chart performance for "Show"
Chart (2023)	Position
Japan (Japan Hot 100)	17
Japan Digital Singles (Oricon)	4

2024 year-end chart performance for "Show"
Chart (2024)	Position
Global Excl. US (Billboard)	144
Japan (Japan Hot 100)	7
Japan Digital Singles (Oricon)	4
Japan Streaming (Oricon)	7

2025 year-end chart performance for "Show"
Chart (2025)	Position
Japan (Japan Hot 100)	87

== Certifications ==
Certifications and sales for "Show"
Region	Certification	Certified units/sales
Japan (RIAJ) Digital	Gold	100,000^{*}
Streaming
Japan (RIAJ)	3× Platinum	300,000,000^{†}
^{*} Sales figures based on certification alone.^{†} Streaming-only figures based on certification alone.

== Release history ==
Release history and formats for "Show"
Region	Date	Format	Version	Label	Ref.
Various	September 6, 2023	Digital download; streaming	Original	Virgin; Universal	
Various	December 31, 2023	Digital download; streaming	Jax Jones remix	Virgin; Universal	
Various	September 6, 2024	Digital download; streaming	Show LP	Virgin; Universal	

== See also ==
- List of Hot 100 number-one singles of 2023 (Japan)
- List of Hot 100 number-one singles of 2024 (Japan)
