= Vivarium (song) =

2026 single by Ado

Single by Ado
- Language: Japanese
- Released: February 18, 2026
- Genre: Math rock; post-hardcore
- Length: 4:03
- Label: Capitol
- Songwriter: Ado
- Producer: Takafumi "Co-K" Kokei

Ado singles chronology
| "Angelseek" (2026) | "Vivarium" (2026) | "Ai Ai a" (2026) |

Music video
- "Vivarium" on YouTube

"Vivarium" (Japanese: ビバリウム) is a song written and recorded by Japanese singer Ado, released on February 18, 2026, via Capitol Records. The song accompanies the biography novel Vivarium: Ado and Me, written by Narumi Komatsu.

== Background and release ==
On January 10, 2026, Ado announced a biography novel of herself, Vivarium: Ado and Me. Written by Narumi Komatsu, the biography is based on Ado's own account of her early childhood and eventual foray into the music scene. Alongside the announcement of the novel, Ado shared she wrote and recorded an accompanying song, "Vivarium".

"Vivarium" was released on February 18, 2026, as a digital single.

== Cover artwork ==
On February 14, Ado revealed the cover art for "Vivarium". The cover art was noted to be her first one taken "in real life" rather than featuring a hand-drawn character. The artwork features a photo of Ado's backside in a closet.

== Music and lyrics ==
In an interview with Billboard Japan, Ado described "Vivarium" as a song where she is "talking to her current self". Encore described "Vivarium" as "a vocal rock song where Ado searches for light despite suffering from self-denial."

== Music video ==
A scene from the "Vivarium" music video featuring Ado's side profile. Multiple critics noted the video was her first to be recorded in a real-world location.

A music video for "Vivarium" was teased by Ado's staff on social media shortly after the digital release of the song. On February 27, her staff announced a music video for "Vivarium" would premiere on her YouTube channel on February 28.

Directed by Kyotaro Hayashi, the music video for "Vivarium" is Ado's first live action music video. Various news outlets reported around 300 takes were recorded for the music video. Ado said that it was her idea to create a live-action music video for "Vivarium".

The music video came to widespread attention due to several shots depicting her in a real-world location. Although she had appeared obscured at concert performances, this was Ado's first unobscured appearance in a music video. Several social media users remarked about the video's depiction of her face, with one fan remarking that they were unaware of Ado's human nature until then. An insider at the music industry told Nikkan Gendai that this decision was likely due to her new career as a music producer.

The video features animated segments depicting her illustrated persona, with Ado's long-time image director Orihara and the animation studio Bees Inc. producing the segments, interspersed throughout the live-action footage.

== Track listing ==
- 7" Vinyl
1. "Vivarium" – 4:03
2. "Vivarium" (instrumental) – 4:03

== Credits and personnel ==
- Ado – vocals
- Takuma Kaneko – bass guitar
- Takafumi "Co-K" Kokei – arrangement, production

== Charts ==
=== Weekly charts ===
Weekly chart performance for "Vivarium"
| Chart (2026) | Peak position |
|---|---|
| Japan (Japan Hot 100) | 26 |
| Japan (Oricon) | 14 |
| Japan Digital Singles (Oricon) | 10 |

=== Monthly charts ===
Monthly chart performance for "Vivarium"
| Chart (2026) | Peak position |
|---|---|
| Japan (Oricon) | 35 |

== Release history ==
Release history and formats for "Vivarium"
| Region | Date | Format | Label | Ref. |
|---|---|---|---|---|
| Various | February 18, 2026 | Digital download; streaming | Capitol | |
| Japan | September 2, 2026 | 7-inch single | Capitol | |
