= Ado's Utattemita Album =

2023 compilation album by Ado

- Standard cover

Compilation album by Ado
- Released: December 13, 2023
- Length: 40:59
- Language: Japanese
- Label: Virgin

Ado chronology
Uta's Songs: One Piece Film Red (2022)	Ado's Utattemita Album (2023)	Zanmu (2024)

Singles from Ado's Utattemita Album
- 1. "Unravel" Released: November 15, 2023; 2. "Dawn and Fireflies" Released: December 11, 2023

Ado's Utattemita Album (Adoの歌ってみたアルバム, Ado no Utattemita Arubamu; lit. 'Ado's tried-to-sing album') is a compilation album by Japanese singer Ado, released on December 13, 2023, via Virgin Music. Announced on September 15, 2023, the album features various Vocaloid and J-pop songs fans voted on for her to cover.

== Background ==
Ado has released multiple cover songs exclusively on her YouTube channel. In May 2022, her management team held a poll on social media for fans to select songs for her to cover. Out of 10,000 votes, PinocchioP's "God-ish" and Ringo Sheena's "Crime and Punishment" were the most voted. Both covers were released via YouTube on July 24, 2022. Her cover of Sheena's "Crime and Punishment" amassed over eight million views. In March 2023, another poll was run on social media by Ado's management regarding what songs fans wanted for her to cover on an album.

In September 2023, Universal Music Japan announced Ado would be releasing her first "utattemita album". A 15-second teaser was released on YouTube, along with limited edition bonus goods being announced to be included at select Japanese retailers. Six of ten confirmed songs were originally announced, including "Crime and Punishment", "Unravel" by Toru Kitajima, and "Villain" by Teniwoha. In October, the full track listing was revealed.

== Track listing ==
Ado's Utattemita Album track listing
No.	Title	Writer(s)	Original artist(s)	Length
1.	"Dried Flowers" (ドライフラワー)	Yuuri	Yuuri	4:49
2.	"Kazari ja Nai no yo Namida wa" (飾りじゃないのよ涙は)	Yōsui Inoue	Akina Nakamori	4:13
3.	"Aishite Aishite Aishite" (愛して愛して愛して)	Kikuo	Kikuo	4:19
4.	"Crime and Punishment" (罪と罰)	Ringo Sheena	Ringo	4:51
5.	"Kawaikute Gomen" (可愛くてごめん)	Shito	HoneyWorks	3:40
6.	"Villain" (ヴィラン)	Teniwoha	Teniwoha	3:20
7.	"God-ish" (神っぽいな)	PinocchioP	PinocchioP	3:25
8.	"Unravel"	Toru Kitajima	TK	3:59
9.	"Buriki no Dance" (ブリキノダンス)	Hinata Denko	Denko	3:19
10.	"Dawn and Fireflies" (夜明けと蛍)	N-buna	N-buna	5:09
Total length:				40:59

== Personnel ==
Credits adapted from Tidal.

Musicians

- Ado – vocals (all tracks)
- Yuta Watanabe – acoustic guitar, electric guitar (1)
- Sakurai Rock – bass (1, 4, 8)
- Akira Sakamoto – drums (1)
- Nao Nishimura – piano (1, 4, 8)
- Tomohiko Ohkanda – bass (2)
- Yoshito Tanaka – guitar (2)
- Daisuke Kawaguchi – keyboard (2)
- Ken Kurihara – saxophone (2)
- Gakutaro Miyauchi – trumpet (2)
- Ken Higeshiro – drums (4)
- Katsushiro Sato – guitar (4), electric guitar (8)
- Nozomu Kitamura – drums (8)
- Naoki Itai – electric guitar (8)
- Yusuke Koshiro – electric guitar (8, 9)

Technical

- Naoki Itai – mixing (1, 4, 8, 9), programming (1, 8, 9)
- Vis – mixing, programming (2, 6)
- Daisuke Kawaguchi – recording arrangement, programming (2)
- Kikuo – recording arrangement (3)
- Kazuya Maeda – mixing (3, 10)
- Sora Tamiya – mixing (5)
- Takafumi "CO-K" Koukei – recording arrangement (5)
- PinocchioP – recording arrangement (7)
- Saburou – mixing (7)
- Yusuke Koshiro – programming, recording arrangement (9)
- Tomomi Ogata – mixing (9)
- N-buna – recording arrangement (10)

== Charts ==
=== Weekly charts ===
Weekly chart performance for Ado's Utattemita Album
Chart (2023–2024)	Peak position
Japanese Albums (Oricon)	2
Japanese Combined Albums (Oricon)	2
Japanese Hot Albums (Billboard Japan)	1

=== Monthly charts ===
Monthly chart performance for Ado's Utattemita Album
Chart (2023)	Position
Japanese Albums (Oricon)	7

=== Year-end charts ===
Year-end chart performance for Ado's Utattemita Album
Chart (2024)	Position
Japanese Albums (Oricon)	37
Japanese Digital Albums (Oricon)	6
Japanese Hot Albums (Billboard Japan)	25

2025 year-end chart performance for Ado's Utattemita Album
Chart (2025)	Position
Japanese Download Albums (Billboard Japan)	70

== Release history ==
Release history and formats for Ado's Utattemita Album
Region	Date	Format(s)	Version	Label	Ref.
Various	December 13, 2023	Digital download; streaming	Standard	Virgin; Universal	
Japan	December 13, 2023	CD	Standard	Virgin; Universal Japan	
Japan	December 13, 2023	CD	Limited	Virgin; Universal Japan	
United States	December 22, 2023	CD	Standard	Universal	
United States	December 22, 2023	CD	Limited	Universal	
