= Strobo =

Debut album by Vaundy

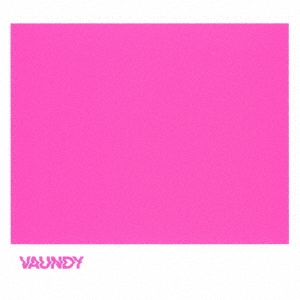

Studio album by Vaundy
- Released: May 27, 2020
- Genres: J-pop, pop rock
- Length: 36:08
- Language: Japanese
- Label: SDR
- Producer: Vaundy

Vaundy chronology
Strobo (2020)	Hadaka no Yuusha (2022)

Strobo (stylized in all lowercase) is the debut studio album by Japanese musician Vaundy, released on May 27, 2020 through Stardust Promotion's label SDR. The album was preceded by many singles, including "Bye by Me" and "Tokyo Flash".

== Release ==
The album was released on May 27, 2020. It contains several of Vaundy's early independently released songs, such as "Tokyo Flash", and new songs like "Tomoshibi", the latter of which was used as the theme song to the 2020 drama adaptation of Tokyo Love Story. Several songs, including "Life Hack" and "Tokyo Flash" received music videos. "Kaiju no Hanauta" was the album's most successful song, peaking at second on the Billboard Japan Hot 100 in 2023.

== Track listing ==
All tracks written and produced by Vaundy.

Strobo track listing
No.	Title	Length
1.	"Audio 001"	0:23
2.	"Tomoshibi" (灯火)	2:58
3.	"Tokyo Flash" (東京フラッシュ)	4:18
4.	"Kaiju no Hanauta" (怪獣の花唄)	3:44
5.	"Life Hack"	3:46
6.	"Fukakouryoku" (不可幸力)	3:20
7.	"Soramimi"	3:33
8.	"Audio 002"	1:08
9.	"Napori"	3:23
10.	"Boku wa Kyou mo" (僕は今日も)	5:27
11.	"Bye by Me"	4:02
Total length:		36:08

== Charts ==
Chart performance for Strobo
Chart (2020)	Peak position
Japanese Albums (Oricon)	5
Japanese Hot Albums (Billboard Japan)	4

== Accolades ==
Year	Ceremony	Result	Ref.
2021	13th CD Shop Awards	Nominated	
