= Shiyui =

Japanese singer

Shiyui シユイ
- Born: 21 October
- Genre: J-pop
- Occupation: Singer
- Instrument: Vocals
- Years active: 2021–present
- Label: Sony Music Associated Records
- Website: shiyui.jp

YouTube information
- Channel: シユイ
- Years active: 2021–present
- Subscribers: 56 thousand
- Views: 29 million
- Last updated: August 26, 2025

Shiyui (シユイ; born 21 October) is a Japanese singer affiliated with Sony Music Entertainment Japan. She began posting cover song videos in January 2021, and made her major label debut in 2022. She has also performed music theme songs for anime works, specifically Mobile Suit Gundam: The Witch from Mercury, Zom 100: Bucket List of the Dead, Undead Unluck, Demon Lord 2099, and Blue Exorcist.

== Early life ==
Shiyui was born on 21 October. While part of a drama club in junior high, she learned about Vocaloid music and anime music, and she was inspired to go into singing by the music of Supercell, later citing their leader Ryo as an inspiration. When an art university she was attending became remote due to the COVID-19 pandemic, she started becoming an utaite after finding her tuition spending to be unproductive due to her lack of creative works. Her stage name Shiyui was derived from the name of Gokōshiyui Amidabutsu, a Buddhist statue at Konkaikōmyō-ji in Kyoto.

== Singing career ==
In January 2021, Shiyui began posting cover songs on social media platforms. Jon-Yakitory recruited Shiyui through creator-aimed social media platform Mecre to be vocalist for their 2022 song "Oni". Tomonori Shiba of Real Sound said of the collaboration: "Jon-Yakitory's loud and dark style, which has roots in alternative rock, pairs perfectly with Shiyui's powerful, somewhat shadowy voice." In July 2022, she released her eponymous debut EP through Incs Toenter.

On 9 November 2022, Shiyui released her major label debut single "Kimiyo Kedakakuare", the ending theme song for Mobile Suit Gundam: The Witch from Mercury. It charted at #19 on the Oricon Singles Chart and #12 on the Oricon Digital Singles Chart. In 2023, she performed "Happiness of the Dead", the theme song of Zom 100: Bucket List of the Dead; it was later released as a single, digitally in July and as a CD in August. She performed "Glow", the theme song for the 2023 Puella Magi Madoka Magica prequel Puella Magi Madoka Magica Scene 0 in Magia Record.

On 22 May 2024, Shiyui released her debut album Be Noble; Music Natalie found it unrestrained from its Internet-based songwriters and composers, saying that "it's easy to see how her voice inspires creative minds, allowing them to let go of their limits." She also released two more singles that year: "Love Call" (ラブコール), the opening theme of Undead Unluck; and "Hollow" (ホロウ), the opening theme of Demon Lord 2099. In 2025, she released another single: "Overlap", the ending theme song for the fourth season of Blue Exorcist.

== Personal life ==
Shiyui is also an illustrator, and she has made several illustrations specifically for her music videos.

== Discography ==
=== Albums ===
Title	Year	Details	Peak chart positions		Sales	Ref.
Title	Year	Details	JPN	JPN Comb.	Sales	Ref.
Be Noble (stylized in low-caps)	2024	Released: 22 May 2024; Label: Sony Music Associated Records	—	—	—	

=== Extended plays ===
Title	Year	Details	Peak chart positions		Sales	Ref.
Title	Year	Details	JPN	JPN Comb.	Sales	Ref.
"Shiyui" (思惟)	2022	Released: July 2022; Label: Incs Toenter	—	—	—	

=== Singles ===
Title	Year	Details	Peak chart positions			Sales	Ref.
Title	Year	Details	JPN	JPN Comb.	JPN Digi.	Sales	Ref.
"Kimiyo Kedakakuare" (君よ 気高くあれ)	2022	Released: 9 November 2022; Label: Sony Music Associated Records	19	—	12	—	
"Happiness of the Dead" (ハピネス オブ ザ デッド)	2023	Released: 9 August 2023; Label: Sony Music Associated Records	—	—	—	—	
"Love Call" (ラブコール)	2024	Released: 21 February 2024; Label: Sony Music Associated Records	—	—	—	—	
"Hollow" (ホロウ)	2024	Released: 27 November 2024; Label: Sony Music Associated Records	—	—	—	—	
"Overlap" (オーバーラップ)	2025	Released: 26 February 2025; Label: Sony Music Associated Records	—	—	—	—	
