= Vaundy =

Japanese musician

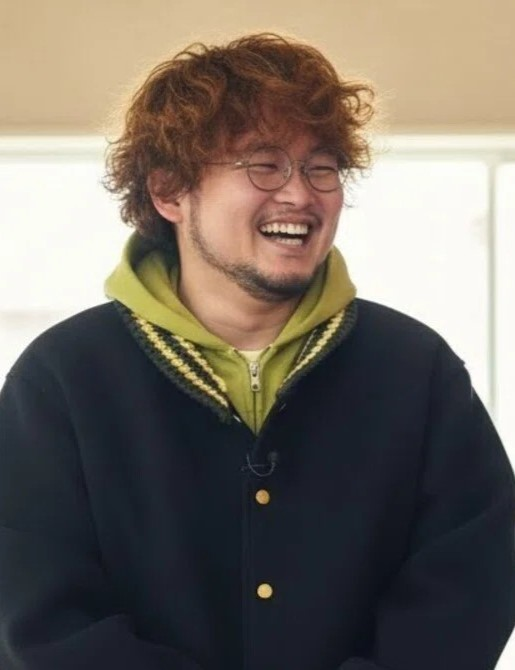
- Vaundy in 2025
- Born: June 6, 2000 (age 26)
- Other name: Vaundy Engawa
- Occupations: Singer; songwriter
- Musical career
- Genre: J-pop
- Years active: 2019–present
- Labels: SDR; Sacra
- Website: https://vaundy.jp/

Vaundy is a Japanese musician. He started his career in 2019 by independently uploading online, before breaking out late in the year with the song "Tokyo Flash". He has released songs for multiple anime and live action TV series, most famously "Hadaka No Yusha" for Ranking of Kings and "Chainsaw Blood" for Chainsaw Man.

== History ==
Vaundy got his start by releasing songs independently onto YouTube in 2019. He broke out in December of the same year with his song "Tokyo Flash". Following this success, he was selected as one of Spotify's "Early Noise 2020" artists, and was named a "Space Shower Retsuden New Force" artist for 2020. He released his debut album Strobo on May 27, 2020. It peaked at number 5 on the Oricon Albums Chart. A song from the album, titled "Tomoshibi", was used as the theme song for the 2020 drama Tokyo Love Story.

He released the EP Hadaka No Yusha on February 23, 2022. It included the song of the same name, which was used as the opening for the anime Ranking of Kings. It peaked at number 6 on the Oricon charts. He collaborated with singer Ado on the song "Backlight", which was used in the soundtrack of the movie One Piece Film: Red. On September 8–9, 2022, he performed two shows at the Nippon Budokan. On October 12, he released the Chainsaw Man ending theme "Chainsaw Blood". It peaked at number 13 on the Billboard Japan Hot 100. He performed on the 73rd Kōhaku Uta Gassen to end the year performing "Kaijū no Hana Uta" and "Omokage (co-performing with Milet, Aimer, Lilas Ikuta)". This performance helped him reach 2nd on the Billboard Japan Top Artists chart, and the song he performed, "Kaijū no Hanauta", jumped to #3 on the Billboard Japan Hot 100, later peaking at #2. On Billboard Japan's 2023 end of year artist charts, he was ranked #4, while "Kaijū no Hanauta" was ranked #3 on the year end Hot 100.

On November 15, 2023, he released his second album Replica. His song "Todome no Ichigeki" (トドメの一撃; lit. "Finishing Strike"), which features Cory Wong, was used as the ending theme song for the second season of the anime Spy × Family. On December 3, 2023, it was revealed that Doraemon: Nobita's Earth Symphony would use Vaundy's latest song "Time Paradox" as the theme song of the film. In June 2024, it was revealed that "Homunculus" (ホムンクルス) would be used as the theme song for the film My Hero Academia: You're Next. In August 2024, his song "Gift" was also used as the ending theme song for the film. In September 2024, was announced that "Fūjin" (風神; lit. "Wind God") would be used as the ending theme song for the live action TV Drama "Light of My Lion". In November 2024, it was revealed that "Hashire Sakamoto" (走れSAKAMOTO; lit. "Run, Sakamoto") would be used as the opening theme song for the anime Sakamoto Days., and begin his biggest arena tour "FUSION", where he recorded the highest attendance at Saitama Super Arena over 2 days at 76,000 people. He announced his first 4 major city dome tour at the final show of his arena tour, becoming the youngest male solo artist to do so.

== Discography ==
=== Studio albums ===
List of studio albums, showing selected details, chart positions, sales, and certifications
Title	Details	Peak positions			Sales	Certifications
Title	Details	JPN	JPN Cmb.	JPN Hot	Sales	Certifications
Strobo	Released: May 27, 2020; Label: SDR; Formats: CD, LP, digital download, streaming	5	6	3	JPN: 5,405 (phy.)	
Replica	Released: November 15, 2023; Label: SDR, Sacra; Formats: Cassette, CD, LP, digital download, streaming	3	3	2	JPN: 80,373 (phy.)	RIAJ: Gold (phy.)

=== Extended plays ===
List of extended plays, showing selected details, chart positions, and sales
Title	Details	Peak chart positions		Sales
Title	Details	JPN	JPN Cmb.	Sales
Hadaka no Yūsha	Released: February 23, 2022; Label: SDR, Sacra; Formats: CD, digital download, streaming	6	5	JPN: 5,630 (phy.)

=== Demo albums ===
List of demo albums, showing selected details
Title	Details
Itai Itai no Tondeike	Released: November 21, 2019; Label: Self-released; Formats: CD

=== Singles ===
==== As lead artist ====
List of singles as lead artist, showing year released, selected chart positions, certifications, and album name
Title	Year	Peak chart positions					Certifications	Album
Title	Year	JPN	JPN Cmb.	JPN Hot	KOR	WW	Certifications	Album
"Tōkyō Flash" (東京フラッシュ)	2019	—	—	64	—	—	RIAJ: 3× Platinum (st.)	Strobo
"Fukakōryoku" (不可幸力)	2020	—	42	36	—	—	RIAJ: 3× Platinum (st.)	Strobo
"Boku wa Kyō mo" (僕は今日も)	2020	—	—	—	—	—	RIAJ: Gold (st.)	Strobo
"Life Hack"	2020	—	—	—	—	—	RIAJ: Platinum (st.)	Strobo
"Bye by Me"	2020	—	—	—	—	—	RIAJ: Gold (st.)	Strobo
"Sekai no Himitsu" (世界の秘密)	2020	—	—	61	—	—	RIAJ: 2× Platinum (st.)	Replica
"Yūkai Sink" (融解sink)	2021	—	—	90	—	—	RIAJ: Gold (st.)	Replica
"Shiwaawase" (しわあわせ)	2021	—	9	3	—	— (Note: "Shiwaawase" did not enter the Billboard Global 200, but peaked at number 169 on the Global Excl. US.)	RIAJ: Platinum (st.)	Replica
"Benefits"	2021	—	—	—	—	—		Replica
"Hanauranai" (花占い)	2021	—	33	24	—	—	RIAJ: 3× Platinum (st.)	Replica
"Tokimeki"	2021	—	—	35	—	—	RIAJ: 2× Platinum (st.)	Replica
"NakiJizō" (泣き地蔵)	2021	—	—	97	—	—	RIAJ: Gold (st.)	Replica
"Odoriko" (踊り子)	2021	—	20	15	79	—	RIAJ: 3× Platinum (st.)	Replica
"Hadaka no Yūsha" (裸の勇者)	2022	6	5	25	—	—	RIAJ: 2× Platinum (st.)	Hadaka no Yūsha and Replica
"Koikaze ni Nosete" (恋風邪にのせて)	2022	—	26	14	—	—	RIAJ: 2× Platinum (st.)	Replica
"Sōmatō" (走馬灯)	2022	—	—	63	—	—		Replica
"Mabataki"	2022	—	—	36	—	—	RIAJ: Gold (st.)	Replica
"Chainsaw Blood"	2022	—	14	13	—	152	RIAJ: Platinum (st.)	Replica
"Hitomibore" (瞳惚れ)	2022	—	50	30	—	—	RIAJ: Gold (st.)	Replica
"Wasuremono" (忘れ物)	2022	—	—	58	—	—		Replica
"Okitegami" (置き手紙)	2022	—	—	65	—	—		Replica
"Mabuta" (まぶた)	2023	—	—	29	—	—	RIAJ: Gold (st.)	Replica
"Sonna Bitter na Hanashi" (そんなbitterな話)	2023	—	22	15	—	—	RIAJ: 2× Platinum (st.)	Replica
"Zero"	2023	—	—	64	—	—		Replica
"Todome no Ichigeki" (トドメの一撃) (featuring Cory Wong)	2023	—	—	22	—	—		Replica
"Time Paradox" (タイムパラドックス)	2024	13	6	7	—	— (Note: "Time Paradox" did not enter the Billboard Global 200, but peaked at number 158 on the Global Excl. US.)	RIAJ: 2× Platinum (st.)	TBA
"Homunculus" (ホムンクルス)	2024	11	14	19	—	—	RIAJ: Gold (st.)	TBA
"Gift"	2024	11	14	—	—	—		TBA
"Gorilla Shibai" (Gorilla芝居)	2024	—	—	—	—	—		TBA
"Fūjin" (風神)	2024	—	13	11	—	—	RIAJ: Platinum (st.)	TBA
"Run Sakamoto Run" (走れSakamoto)	2025	17	28	28	—	—	RIAJ: Gold (st.)	TBA
"Jinsei wa Mix Nuts no Kumiawase" (人生はミックスナッツの組み合わせ)	2025	—	—	—	—	—		TBA
"How Do I Know" (僕にはどうしてわかるんだろう)	2025	—	39	20	—	—		TBA
"Majide Sayonara Baby" (まじで、サヨナラべぃべぃ)	2025	—	—	93	—	—		TBA
"Pained"	2025	—	—	—	—	—		TBA
"Saikai" (再会)	2025	—	29	18	—	—		TBA
"Zutto Love Song" (ずっとラブソング)	2025	—	—	73	—	—		TBA
"Wasurerumaeni" (忘れる前に)	2025	—	—	51	—	—		TBA
"Iseijin" (偉生人)	2025	—	—	39	—	—		TBA
"Kiseki" (軌跡)	2025	—	—	—	—	—		TBA
"Yobigoe" (呼び声)	2025	—	—	37	—	—		TBA
"Singularity" (シンギュラリティ)	2026	—	—	56	—	—		TBA
"The Silence"	2026	—	—	—	—	—		TBA
"Fly Away" (飛ぶ時)	2026	18	26	19	—	—		TBA
"Way Out" (飛ぼうよ)	2026	18	26	—	—	—		TBA
"Idea ga Afurete Nemurenai" (イデアが溢れて眠れない)	2026	—	—	49	—	—		TBA
"Kimagure" (気まぐれ)	2026	—	—	—	—	—		TBA
"Kagerō" (かげろう)	2026	—	—	25	—	—		TBA
"Destiny Journeys"	2026	—	—	—	—	—		TBA
"—" denotes releases that did not chart or were not released in that region.

==== As featured artist ====
List of singles as featured artist, showing year released and album name
Title	Year	Album
"Ash" (Nulbarich featuring Vaundy)	2020	New Gravity

==== Promotional singles ====
List of promotional singles, showing year released, selected chart positions, certifications, and album name
Title	Year	Peak chart positions			Certifications	Album
Title	Year	JPN Cmb.	JPN Hot	WW Excl. US	Certifications	Album
"Tomoshibi" (灯火)	2020	—	—	—	RIAJ: Platinum (st.)	Strobo
"Kaijū no Hanauta" (怪獣の花唄)	2020	5	2	98	RIAJ: Gold (dig.); Diamond (st.)	Strobo
"Chikyūgi" (地球儀) (with Aimer)	2021	—	—	—		Walpurgis
"Like Breathing" (呼吸のように)	2023	—	—	—		Replica
"Zenzenzense" (前前前世)	2025	6	5	—		Dear Jubilee: Radwimps Tribute
"—" denotes releases that did not chart or were not released in that region.

=== Other charted and certified songs ===
List of songs not released as singles, showing year released, selected chart positions, certifications, and album name
Title	Year	Peak chart positions		Certifications	Album
Title	Year	JPN Cmb.	JPN Hot	Certifications	Album
"Soramini"	2020	—	—	RIAJ: Gold (st.)	Strobo
"Napori"	2020	24	27	RIAJ: 3× Platinum (st.)	Strobo
"Omokage" (self-cover)	2022	—	—	RIAJ: Gold (st.)	Hadaka no Yūsha
"Jōnetsu" (常熱)	2023	—	—	RIAJ: Gold (st.)	Replica
"—" denotes releases that did not chart.

=== Guest appearances ===
List of non-single guest appearances, showing year released, other performing artists, and album name
Title	Year	Other artist(s)	Album
"Modern Loneliness" (Vaundy remix)	2020	Lauv	How I'm Feeling (The Extras)
"Missing"	2022	—N/a	Off the Wall: Ellegarden Tribute
"Rose"	2023	Chilli Beans.	Mixtape

=== Songwriting and production credits ===
All song credits are adapted from the Japanese Society for Rights of Authors, Composers and Publishers's database unless stated otherwise.

List of songs written by Vaundy for other artists, showing year released, artist name, and name of the album
Song	Year	Artist	Album	Lyricist	Composer	Arranger
"Sorrow"	2020	Takashi Matsuo	Utautai	Yes	Yes	No
"Lemonade"	2021	Chilli Beans.	Dancing Alone and Chilli Beans.	No	Yes	Yes
"Andron"	2021	Chilli Beans.	Daydream and Chilli Beans.	No	No	Yes
"Omokage"	2021	Milet, Aimer, and Lilas Ikuta	Non-album single	Yes	Yes	Yes
"Madou Ito"	2022	Masaki Suda	Spin	Yes	Yes	Yes
"It's Me"	2022	Chilli Beans.	Chilli Beans.	Yes	Yes	Yes
"This Way"	2022	Chilli Beans.	Chilli Beans.	No	No	Yes
"Backlight"	2022	Ado	Uta's Songs: One Piece Film Red	Yes	Yes	Yes
"Kubittake"	2022	Yama	Versus the Night	Yes	Yes	Yes
"Rose"	2023	Chilli Beans.	Mixtape	Yes	Yes	Yes
"Ibara"	2023	Ado	Zanmu	Yes	Yes	Yes
"Tōmei ni Naritai"	2024	Number i	No. I	Yes	Yes	Yes

== Awards and nominations ==
Name of the award ceremony, year presented, category, nominee(s) of the award, and the result of the nomination
Award ceremony	Year	Category	Nominee(s)/work(s)	Result	Ref.
MTV Europe Music Awards	2021	Best Japanese Act	Vaundy	Nominated	
MTV Video Music Awards Japan	2021	Best Visual Effects	"Shiwaawase"	Won	
MTV Video Music Awards Japan	2022	Artist of the Year	Vaundy	Won	
Japan Gold Disc Awards	2024	Special Award	Vaundy	Won	
Japan Gold Disc Awards	2025	Song of the Year by Streaming	"Time Paradox"	Won	
