= Phantom Siita =

Japanese idol girl group

- Origin: Japan
- Genre: J-pop
- Years active: 2024–present
- Labels: Cloud Nine; Virgin
- Members: Mona; Miu; Rinka; Moka
- Past members: Hisui
- Website: phantomsiita.com

Phantom Siita (ファントムシータ) is a "retro-horror" Japanese idol girl group formed in 2024. They are produced by Ado.

== History ==
Phantom Siita were formed on June 25, 2024. They released their debut digital single "Otomodachi" the next day. From July to October, they performed as the opening act of Ado's "Mona Lisa's Profile" Tour. Their second digital single, "Just Wanna XXXX with You", was released on July 31. On August 28, they released their third digital single, "Devilish Girl". Their fourth digital single, "Hanabami", was released on September 27. In October, they released their fifth digital single "Conflicting" on October 10, and their sixth digital single "Zoku Zoku" on October 25. Their debut album, Girlhood Memories, was released on October 30. On November 1, they held their first concert at the Nippon Budokan.

From January to February 2025, they embarked on their first world tour called Phantom Siita - 1st World Tour "Moth to a Flame". In April 2025, the group signed with Universal Music Japan label Virgin Music They released the single "Love, Hate" on July 9. From July to August, they embarked on their first tour of Japan called Phantom Siita - 1st Japan Tour "Flame Medusa". Their seventh digital single, "Noah", was released on August 25, followed by their eighth digital single, "Bot Bakka", on November 11.

On January 30, 2026, they released their ninth digital single "Rose-Colored Moon". On April 5, they released their tenth digital single "Mo-ii-kai?". It was followed by the release of their second single under Universal Music Japan, "Horror Queen" on June 24. They will embark on a Zepp tour across Japan from July to August 2026 called Phantom Siita Zepp Tour 2026 "Phantom Land".

== Members ==
Current

- Mona (もな)
- Miu (美雨)
- Rinka (凛花)
- Moka (百花)

Former

- Hisui (灯翠)

== Discography ==
=== Studio albums ===
List of studio albums, with selected details and chart positions
Title	Details	Peak chart positions	
Title	Details	JPN	JPN Hot
Girlhood Memories (少女の日の思い出, Shōjo no Hi no Omoide)	Released: October 30, 2024; Label: Cloud Nine; Formats: CD, digital download, streaming	10	10

=== Singles ===
List of singles, showing year released and album name
Title	Year	Peak chart positions		Album
Title	Year	JPN	JPN Hot	Album
"Otomodachi" (おともだち)	2024	—	—	Girlhood Memories
"Just Wanna XXXX with You" (キミと××××したいだけ, Kimi to XXXX Shitai dake)	2024	—	—	Girlhood Memories
"Devilish Girl" (魔性少女, Mashō Shōjo)	2024	—	—	Girlhood Memories
"Hanabami" (花喰み)	2024	—	—	Girlhood Memories
"Conflicting" (乙女心中, Otome Shinju)	2024	—	—	Girlhood Memories
"Zoku Zoku" (ゾクゾク)	2024	—	—	Girlhood Memories
"Love, Hate" (すき、きらい)	2025	7	98	Non-album singles
"Noah" (ノア)	2025	—	—	Non-album singles
"Bot Bakka" (botばっか)	2025	—	—	Non-album singles
"Rose-Colored Moon" (薔薇色の月)	2026	—	—	Non-album singles
"Mo-ii-kai?" (もーいーかい？)	2026	—	—	Non-album singles
"Horror Queen" (ホラークイーン)	2026	2	41	Non-album singles
"Meguru" (輪廻る)	2026	—	—	Non-album singles
"The Mermaid's Song" (にんぎょひめのうた)	2026	—	—	Non-album singles
"Sweet Pea" (スイートピー)	2026	—	—	Non-album singles
"—" denotes releases that did not chart or were not released in that region.
