= Kyōgen (album) =

Studio album by Ado
- Released: January 26, 2022
- Recorded: 2020–2021
- Genres: J-pop; rock; tropical house; EDM
- Length: 52:19
- Language: Japanese
- Label: Virgin
- Producers: Three; TeddyLoid; Kanaria; Jon-Yakitory; Whale Don't Sleep; Mewhan; Mikito P; Hiiragi Kirai; Teniwoha; Neru; Mafumafu; Syudou; Nilfruits; Ine; Biz

Ado chronology
Kyōgen (2022)	Uta's Songs: One Piece Film Red (2022)

Singles from Kyōgen
- 1. "Usseewa" Released: October 23, 2020; 2. "Readymade" Released: December 24, 2020; 3. "Gira Gira" Released: February 14, 2021; 4. "Odo" Released: April 27, 2021; 5. "Yoru no Pierrot" Released: June 14, 2021; 6. "Aitakute" Released: August 12, 2021; 7. "Ashura-chan" Released: October 28, 2021

Kyōgen (狂言; "kyōgen", lit. "mad words" or "wild speech") is the debut studio album by Japanese singer Ado, released January 26, 2022, by Virgin Music. A J-pop and rock record, the album was produced by various Vocaloid musicians.

Upon its release, Kyōgen was commercially successful within Japan. The album debuted and peaked at number one on the Oricon Combined Albums Chart, Oricon Albums Chart and the Billboard Japan Hot Albums chart.

== Background ==
Ado, the pseudonym of a Japanese singer, signed with Virgin Music in 2020, at the age of 17. She released her debut single "Usseewa", which became popular among the Japanese youth. Despite being released digitally, "Usseewa" peaked at number one on the Billboard Japan Hot 100, and number 41 on the Billboard Global 200. Reaching 100 million streams after its 17th week on the chart, Ado became the sixth person in history to achieve this. She also became the youngest solo artist to reach 100 million streams. Later that year, she released her second single, "Readymade".

In January 2022, Universal Music Japan announced Ado's debut studio album would be released later that month. Universal Japan announced six new songs would be on the album, along with Ado's previous digital singles. "Kokoro to iu Na no Fukakai" was released as a promotional single prior to the release of the album on January 17, 2022.

== Promotion ==
Seven songs from Kyōgen were used in commercial tie-ins. "Readymade" was used as the ending theme for Abema's AbemaPrime. "Odo" was used by NHK in a program in promotion of Vocaloid. "Aitakute" was used as an insert song for the Japanese film Kaguya-sama Final: Love Is War. "Ashura-chan" served as the theme song for TV Asahi's drama, Doctor-X: Surgeon Michiko Daimon. "Kokoro to iu Na no Fukakai" was used as theme song for Kantele and Fuji TV's drama, Doctor White. TBS Television used "Motherland" as the theme song for the 2022 Winter Olympics. "Yoru no Pierrot" additionally was used as an opening theme song for a Japanese drama series.

== Commercial performance ==
Kyōgen scored 163,052 points in its first week, debuting at number one on the Oricon Combined Albums Chart. It sold 142,041 physical copies in its first week, debuting at number one on the Oricon Albums Chart. The album also debuted at the top spot both on Billboard Japan Hot Albums chart and Oricon Digital Albums chart. Kyōgen became the first debut studio album by a female solo artist to debut atop the Oricon charts in 10 years, the previous being Japanese singer Miwa's 2011 studio album, Guitarissimo. The album was also the first to sell over 100,000 copies in Japan during its first week by a female artist since Superfly's 2008 self titled debut album.

== Track listing ==
Kyōgen track listing
No.	Title	Writer(s)	Producer(s)	Length
1.	"Readymade" (レディメイド)	Three	Three	4:03
2.	"Odo" (踊)	Giga; TeddyLoid; Deco*27	Giga; TeddyLoid	3:30
3.	"Domestic De Violence" (ドメスティックでバイオレンス)	Kanaria	Kanaria	2:38
4.	"Freedom"	Jon-Yakitory	Jon-Yakitory	3:06
5.	"Fireworks" (花火 "Hanabi")	Whale Don't Sleep	Whale Don't Sleep	3:32
6.	"Aitakute" (会いたくて)	Mewhan	Mewhan; Mikito P	4:55
7.	"Lucky Bruto" (ラッキー・ブルート)	Hiiragi Kirai	Hiiragi Kirai	3:30
8.	"Gira Gira" (ギラギラ)	Teniwoha	Teniwoha	4:36
9.	"Ashura-chan" (阿修羅ちゃん)	Neru	Neru	3:15
10.	"Kokoro to iu Na no Fukakai" (心という名の不可解)	Mafumafu	Mafumafu	4:30
11.	"Usseewa" (うっせぇわ)	Syudou	Syudou	3:27
12.	"Motherland" (マザーランド)	Nilfruits	Nilfruits	4:20
13.	"Kagakushu" (過学習)	Ine	Ine	3:36
14.	"Yoru no Pierrot" (夜のピエロ)	Biz	Biz	3:21
Total length:				52:19

Kyōgen – limited edition DVD bonus
No.	Title	Length
1.	"Usseewa" (music video)
2.	"Readymade" (music video)
3.	"Gira Gira" (music video)
4.	"Odo" (music video)
5.	"Yoru no Pierrot" (music video)
6.	"Aitakute" (music video)
7.	"Ashura-chan" (music video)

Notes

- English and Hepburn romanization track titles adapted from Tidal.
- "Freedom" is stylized in all upper case lettering.
- "Kokoro to iu Na no Fukakai" is stylized as "KokoroToIuNaNoFukakai" on digital stores.

== Personnel ==
Credits adapted from Tidal and album liner notes.

Musicians

- Malo – bass
- Koji Shinnai – guitar
- Tsubasa Takada – string arrangement
- Tatsuya Kitani – bass
- Yumao – drums
- Zenko Mitsuya – guitar
- Ado – vocals
- Three – production, songwriting
- Giga – production, songwriting
- TeddyLoid – production, songwriting
- Deco*27 – songwriting
- Kanaria – production, songwriting
- Jon-Yakitory – production, songwriting
- Whale Don't Sleep – production, songwriting
- Mewhan – production, songwriting
- Mikito P – production
- Hiiragikirai – production, songwriting
- Teniwoha – production, songwriting
- Neru – production, songwriting
- Mafumafu – production, songwriting
- Syudou – production, songwriting
- Nilefruits – production, songwriting
- Ine – production, songwriting
- Biz – production, songwriting

Technical

- Kenichi Koga – immersive mix engineering
- Three – recording arrangement
- Giga – recording arrangement, mastering
- TeddyLoid – recording arrangement
- Naoki Itai – mixing
- Vis – mixing
- Mikito P – recording arrangement
- Hiiragikirai – recording arrangement, mixing
- Teniwoha – recording arrangement
- Neru – vocal arrangement
- Syudou – recording arrangement
- Ine – recording arrangement
- Biz – recording arrangement
- Tsubasa Yamazaki – mastering
- Kenji Yoshino – mastering

Visuals and imagery

- Orihara – art direction, illustrator
- Jun Hirota – graphic design
- Shiho Katsuno – graphic design

== Charts ==
=== Weekly charts ===
Weekly chart performance for Kyōgen
Chart (2022)	Peak position
Japanese Albums (Oricon)	1
Japanese Combined Albums (Oricon)	1
Japanese Hot Albums (Billboard Japan)	1

=== Monthly charts ===
Monthly chart performance for Kyōgen
Chart (2022)	Peak position
Japanese Albums (Oricon)	2

=== Year-end charts ===
2022 year-end chart performance for Kyōgen
Chart (2022)	Position
Japanese Albums (Oricon)	15
Japanese Combined Albums (Oricon)	9
Japanese Hot Albums (Billboard Japan)	9

2023 year-end chart performance for Kyōgen
Chart (2023)	Position
Japanese Hot Albums (Billboard Japan)	85

== Certifications ==
Certifications and sales for Kyōgen
Region	Certification	Certified units/sales
Japan (RIAJ)	Platinum	250,000^{^}
^{^} Shipments figures based on certification alone.

== Release history ==
Release history and formats for Kyōgen
Region	Date	Format(s)	Version	Label	Ref.
Various	January 26, 2022	Digital download; streaming	Standard	Virgin; Universal	
Japan	January 26, 2022	CD	Standard	Virgin; Universal Japan	
Japan	January 26, 2022	CD	First Press	Virgin; Universal Japan	
Japan	January 26, 2022	CD; DVD	Limited	Virgin; Universal Japan	
Japan	January 26, 2022	CD	Acryl Charm Limited	Virgin; Universal Japan	
Japan	January 26, 2022	CD	Figure + Book Limited	Virgin; Universal Japan	
Japan	January 26, 2023	Vinyl	Standard	Virgin; Universal Japan	
Various	February 10, 2023	Vinyl	Standard	Geffen	
