= Dignity (Ado song) =

Single by Ado

from the album Zanmu
- Language: Japanese
- Released: September 18, 2023
- Length: 4:12
- Label: Virgin
- Songwriter(s): Koshi Inaba
- Producer(s): Tak Matsumoto

Ado singles chronology
"Show" (2023)	"Dignity" (2023)	"Kura Kura" (2023)

Music video
- "Dignity" on YouTube

"Dignity" is a song recorded by Japanese singer Ado, released on September 18, 2023, via Virgin Music. Written by Koshi Inaba, the song served as the theme song for the live-action film adaptation of The Silent Service.

== Background ==
On July 20, 2023, Ado announced she recorded a song written and produced by Japanese rock duo B'z for a live-action film adaptation of The Silent Service. Titled "Dignity", an excerpt of the song was included in the trailer for the film. In September, a release date of the song was announced for September 18 alongside the single cover art.

== Personnel ==
Credits adapted from Tidal.

- Ado – vocals
- Koshi Inaba – lyrics
- Yūta Saitō – piano
- Tak Matsumoto – production, music, guitar
- Hideo Yamaki – drums
- Hitoshi Konno – strings
- Tsubasa Yamazaki – mastering
- Hiroyuki Kobayashi – mixing, engineering
- Seiji Kameda – arrangement

== Charts ==
Chart performance for "Dignity"
Chart (2023)	Peak position
Japan (Japan Hot 100)	34
