= Ibara (song) =

Single by Ado

from the album Zanmu
- Language: Japanese
- Released: May 9, 2023
- Length: 4:21
- Label: Virgin
- Songwriter: Vaundy
- Producer: Vaundy

Ado singles chronology
"I'm a Controversy" (2023)	"Ibara" (2023)	"Himawari" (2023)

Music video
- "Ibara" on YouTube

"Ibara" (Japanese: いばら; lit. "thorns") is a song recorded by Japanese singer Ado, released on May 9, 2023, by Virgin Music. The song was released as the theme song for Mezamashi TV on Fuji TV.

== Personnel ==
Credits adapted from Apple Music.

Musicians

- Ado – vocals

Technical

- Vaundy– Producer, Arranger, Songwriter

== Charts ==
Weekly chart performance for "Ibara"
Chart (2023)	Peak position
Japan (Japan Hot 100)	38
