= Himawari (Ado song) =

Single by Ado

from the album Zanmu
- Language: Japanese
- Released: July 11, 2023
- Genre: J-pop
- Length: 4:13
- Label: Virgin
- Songwriter: Mewhan
- Producer: Mewhan

Ado singles chronology
"Ibara" (2023)	"Himawari" (2023)	"Unforgiven" (Japanese version) (2023)

Music video
- "Himawari" on YouTube

"Himawari" (Japanese: 向日葵; lit. 'sunflower') is a song recorded by Japanese singer Ado from her second studio album Zanmu (2024). The song serves as the theme song for the show 18/40: Futari Nara Yume mo Koi mo.

== Background ==
On July 3, 2023, the song was announced as the theme song for 18/40: Futari Nara Yume mo Koi mo and to be released on July 11.

== Commercial performance ==
"Himawari" reached number 19 on the Billboard Japan Hot 100 for the week on September 25, 2023.

== Charts ==
Chart performance for "Himawari"
Chart (2023)	Peak position
Japan (Japan Hot 100)	19
Japan Combined Singles (Oricon)	24

== Certifications ==
Certifications for "Himawari"
Region	Certification	Certified units/sales
Streaming
Japan (RIAJ)	Platinum	100,000,000^{†}
^{†} Streaming-only figures based on certification alone.
