= All Night Radio (song) =

2023 single by Ado

Single by Ado

from the album Zanmu
- Language: Japanese; English
- Released: October 14, 2023
- Genre: City pop
- Length: 3:34
- Label: Virgin
- Songwriter: Mitchie M
- Producer: Vocaloid-P

Ado singles chronology
"Kura Kura" (2023)	"All Night Radio" (2023)	"Unravel" (2023)

Music video
- "All Night Radio" on YouTube

"All Night Radio" (Japanese: オールナイトレディオ, Hepburn: Ōru Naito Redio) is a song recorded by Japanese singer Ado, released on October 14, 2023 by Virgin Music. The song was written and produced by Vocaloid producer Mitchie M.

"All Night Radio" serves as the theme song for the stage play Ano Yoru de Aetara by the Nippon Broadcasting System.

== Background ==
On October 9, 2023, Ado announced that "All Night Radio" would be released on October 14, 2023.

== Commercial performance ==
"All Night Radio" debuted at No. 99 on the Billboard Japan Hot 100 for the week of October 30, 2023.

== Music video ==
A music video was released on YouTube on November 11, 2023.

== Personnel ==
Credits adapted from Apple Music.

Musicians

- Ado – Vocals

Technical

- Mitchie M – Producer

== Charts ==
Weekly chart performance for "All Night Radio"
Chart (2023)	Peak position
Japan (Japan Hot 100)	99

== Release history ==
Release history and formats for "All Night Radio"
Region	Date	Format	Label	Ref.
Various	October 14, 2023	Digital download; streaming	Virgin; Universal	
