= Chocolat Cadabra =

Single by Ado

from the album Zanmu
- Language: Japanese
- Released: January 31, 2024
- Length: 3:03
- Label: Virgin
- Songwriters: Camellia; Taku Inoue
- Producer: Taku Inoue

Ado singles chronology
"Dawn and Fireflies" (2023)	"Chocolat Cadabra" (2024)	"Value" (2024)

Music video
- "Chocolat Cadabra" on YouTube

"Chocolat Cadabra" (Japanese: ショコラカタブラ, Hepburn: Shokora Katabura) is a song recorded by Japanese singer Ado, released on January 31, 2024, by Virgin Music. The song was released as part of the Lotte Corporation 60th anniversary.

== Music video ==
A music video was released on January 31, 2024, on YouTube, the music video was animated by Studio Trigger. The video depicts a girl who is whisked away to a mysterious, chocolate-themed realm presided over by both a scientist and a witch.

== Personnel ==
Credits adapted from Apple Music.

Musicians

- Ado – vocals

Technical

- Camellia – lyrics
- Taku Inoue – composer, arranger, producer
- Masashi Uramoto – mixing

== Charts ==
Weekly chart performance for "Chocolat Cadabra"
Chart (2024)	Peak position
Japan (Japan Hot 100)	31
Japan Combined Singles (Oricon)	38
