= Giga (musician) =

Japanese composer

- Also known as: ギガP, GigaP
- Born: December 15, 1991 (age 34)
- Origin: Akita Prefecture, Japan
- Genres: Vocaloid; dance; hip-hop; electro
- Occupations: composer, arranger, singer
- Years active: 2009–present
- Formerly of: REOL
- Website: giga.style

Giga (born December 15, 1991) is a Japanese music producer who composes Vocaloid and electronic dance music.

== Career ==
In 2009, Giga began uploading Vocaloid music on the Japanese video website Niconico, first uploading an original composition in 2010. His first original song to hit one million views was "Gigantic O.T.N" in 2012. With "Hibikase" in 2014, he helped pioneer Vocaloid electronic dance music. Giga frequently collaborated with singer-songwriter Reol and video creator Okiku, and they self-published the albums No title+ and No title- in 2014.

In 2016, Giga, Reol, and Okiku formed the musical unit REOL under Toy's Factory and released the album Sigma. After the group disbanded in 2017, Giga returned to Vocaloid music.

In 2018, Giga released "BRING IT ON" for the Vocaloid event Magical Mirai as a theme song for the 10th anniversary of Kagamine Rin and Kagamine Len. In 2020, he and Vocaloid producer Mitchie M composed "Wah Wah World", a theme song of the mobile game Hatsune Miku: Colorful Stage!. Giga also composed "Ready Steady" for the in-game musical unit Vivid BAD SQUAD.

In 2021, he began collaborating with music producer TeddyLoid. They consider each other to have opposite strengths, with Giga composing delicate melodies and precise tracks and TeddyLoid composing dynamic sounds over a wide range of genres. Their first major song together was "Odo", a single for Ado. Their other collaborations include "The Struggle is Real" (feat. Meme Tokyo), "KIKIKAIKAI" (feat. Yuzu), "Let's End the World" (feat. Mori Calliope), "Desperate" (feat. LOLUET), "Show" (also feat. Ado), “Clutch” (feat. Irregular Dice), "Let Me Battle" (feat. 9Lana), "Go-Getters" (also featuring Mori Calliope), "ULTRA C" (feat. Vivid BAD SQUAD), "Knock It Out!" (feat. Amane Kanata), "POW POW" (feat. ELSEE), "Upboomboom" (feat. MYERA), "Act" (feat. Daoko), "Pikaaan!" (feat. Rina Matsuda & Hikaru Morita of Sakurazaka46), "Awake" (feat. Hoshimachi Suisei), "Violetta" (feat. Chogakusei) and "Monstruo" (also feat. Ado).

== Musical style ==
Giga composes fast-paced and energetic music with rap and heavy bass. He is influenced by K-pop and Western music while maintaining elements of Japanese song structure. According to Teddyloid, Giga has a unique approach in editing vocals, creating a sound between human and mechanical. Giga said that he pays close attention when pitch shifting, sometimes adding vibrato or pitching up the ends of words.

Giga first used FL Studio as his digital audio workstation and later switched to Ableton Live to work with TeddyLoid. He mainly uses the Vocaloid voicebanks Kagamine Rin & Len, and also uses Hatsune Miku, Megurine Luka, GUMI, and IA.

== Discography ==
=== Albums ===
- No title+ (2014 (Note: Released for streaming in 2024))

=== Singles ===
Year	Title	Vocals	Co-composer	Tie-in
2012	"Gigantic O.T.N"	Kagamine Len		
2012	"+♂"	Kagamine Len		
2014	"Okochama Sensou"	Kagamine Rin & Len		
2018	"BRING IT ON" (劣等上等)	Kagamine Rin & Len		Magical Mirai
2020	"GETCHA!"	Hatsune Miku & GUMI	KIRA	
2020	"Wah Wah World"	Hatsune Miku & Kagamine Rin	Mitchie M	Hatsune Miku: Colorful Stage!
2020	"Ready Steady"	Vivid BAD SQUAD & Hatsune Miku		Hatsune Miku: Colorful Stage!
2020	"Ready Steady"	Hatsune Miku, Kagamine Rin & Len		Hatsune Miku: Colorful Stage!
2021	"G4L"	Giga		Artiswitch episode 1 theme song
2022	"CH4NGE"	KAFU		
2022	"desperate"	LOLUET	TeddyLoid	
2023	"I GOT YOU!" (ガッチュー！)	Hatsune Miku, Kagamine Rin & Len		Project Voltage
2024	"Beyond the way"	Vivid BAD SQUAD & Hatsune Miku		Hatsune Miku: Colorful Stage!
2024	"Beyond the way"	Hatsune Miku, Kagamine Rin & Len		Hatsune Miku: Colorful Stage!
2024	"Nobosemon Hero"	Kagamine Len & Zundamon	ChibaNyan	
2024	"Ultra C"	Vivid BAD SQUAD & Hatsune Miku	TeddyLoid	Hatsune Miku: Colorful Stage!
2024	"Ultra C"	Kagamine Rin & Len	TeddyLoid	Hatsune Miku: Colorful Stage!
2024	"DEAR"	Reol		
2024	"DEAR"	Hatsune Miku		
2025	"Pikkaan!"	Rina Matsuda & Hikaru Morita (Sakurazaka46)	TeddyLoid	Pokémon Horizons – The Search for Laqua ending theme
2025	"Act"	Daoko	TeddyLoid	
2025	"Play"	Hatsune Miku		
2025	"Hakudo"	Nana Mizuki	Shota Horie	Compass anime opening theme
2025	"Hakudo"	GUMI	Shota Horie	
