= Maretu =

Japanese musician

MARETU
- Origin: Japan
- Genres: Kawaii metal; J-pop; electronic music; bitpop
- Occupations: Songwriter, composer
- Instruments: Vocaloid (Hatsune Miku, Kagamine Rin, GUMI, Lily, Fukase), guitar, piano, synthesizer
- Years active: 2011–present

Maretu (stylized in all caps), also known as Gokuaku-P (Japanese: 極悪P, "EvilP"), is a Japanese musician, Vocaloid producer, and songwriter. He started releasing Vocaloid music in 2011, and Real Sound described him as one of the representative Vocaloid producers since 2017. He has gained a cult following.

== Artistry ==
"Mind Brand"
Sample of Maretu's "Mind Brand" performed by Hatsune Miku, can be loud.

Maretu's musical style mixes heavy metal, chiptune, and techno-pop, and he extensively uses drum patterns and Phrygian mode in his musical compositions. Another feature of his songs is the use of traditional Japanese musical elements. As an example, he incorporated shamisen and kakegoe in the B melody of SIU, applying the Phrygian mode to the Japanese-style scale similar to the mode.

Maretu's music videos often feature word clouds, and his lyrics usually tell a story related to the theme, containing depressed romantic feelings, alienation, and antinatalism. Kobashi Taiki from KAI-YOU described his lyrics as "dark and difficult to understand". Maretu always creates a disagreeable atmosphere in his work through dissonance, sound effects with profound meaning, and painful sighs.

== Personal life ==
Maretu has been diagnosed with autism, attention deficit hyperactivity disorder, and mild to moderate depression. In 2018, he admitted to cheating on his ex-girlfriend and sued her for defamation, as she alleged he cheated with someone below the age of consent in Japan.

== Discography ==
=== Coin Locker Baby ===
Coin Locker Baby (Japanese: コインロッカーベイビー) is Maretu's first album, released on March 2, 2016.

Release date	Title	Album No.	URL
March 2, 2016	Saishuubi (最終日)	1	YouTube
February 2, 2013	Coin Locker Baby (コインロッカーベイビー)	2	YouTube
March 2, 2016	Kawaki (渇き)	3	YouTube
December 11, 2015	Suji (スヂ)	4	YouTube
March 2, 2016	Sanjou (惨場)	5	YouTube
December 27, 2013	Shoujo Keshigomu (少女ケシゴム)	6	YouTube
August 20, 2015	Scrumize (スクラマイズ)	7	YouTube
September 17, 2015	Born before (うまれるまえは)	8	YouTube
January 9, 2015	Packet Hero (パケットヒーロー)	9	YouTube
March 2, 2016	Sakuran (錯乱)	10	YouTube
October 30, 2015	Miseenen (ミセエネン)	11	YouTube
May 2, 2015	Umitagari (うみたがり)	12	YouTube
May 29, 2015	Mind Brand (マインドブランド)	13	YouTube
March 2, 2016	Brain Revolution Girl 2016 ver. (脳内革命ガール2016 Ver.)	14	YouTube
March 2, 2016	Rational Time (ラショナルタイム)	15	YouTube
March 2, 2016	Kara o Watte Hanasou (殻を割って話そう)	Bonus	N/A
March 2, 2016	Dime Novel (ダイム・ノベル )	Bonus	N/A

=== FRIED EYE ===
FRIED EYE (Japanese: フライドアイ) is Maretu's second album, released on December 21, 2018. The album is entirely instrumental.

Release date	Title	Album No.	URL
December 21, 2018	Crawl (這徊)	1	YouTube
December 21, 2018	EYE HAVE YOU (アイハブユー)	2	YouTube
December 21, 2018	Prankish Tom (いたずらトムくん)	3	YouTube
December 21, 2018	These hands (コノテニ)	4	YouTube
December 21, 2018	The melancholy of Bach (バッハの憂鬱)	5	YouTube
December 21, 2018	Heavy Metal Hazard (鉄鐘楼)	6	YouTube
December 21, 2018	Electrical Detonator (電気雷管)	7	YouTube
December 21, 2018	Also Sprach F# (F#は斯く語りき)	8	YouTube
April 24, 2017	CORN	9	YouTube
December 21, 2018	THESE EYES (コノメニ)	10	YouTube
December 21, 2018	Parametric (媒介変数)	11	YouTube
December 21, 2018	Wyvern ammo (竜撃弾)	12	YouTube
December 21, 2018	Fried eye (フライドアイ)	13	YouTube

=== SIU ===
SIU (Japanese: しう) is Maretu's third album, released on November 17, 2019.

Release date	Title	Album No.	URL
November 17, 2019	Magical Doctor (マジカルドクター)	1	YouTube
May 27, 2016	Maegamist (マエガミスト)	2	YouTube
April 8, 2017	I'm High (アイムハイ)	3	YouTube
June 30, 2017	White Happy (ホワイトハッピー)	4	YouTube
August 25, 2017	Uminaoshi (うみなおし)	5	YouTube
September 29, 2017	Darling (ダーリン)	6	YouTube
January 1, 2018	Toutetsu (トウテツ)	7	YouTube
March 16, 2018	Koukatsu (コウカツ)	8	YouTube
November 11, 2018	Tool (トゥール)	9	YouTube
August 24, 2019	Gokiburi no Aji (ゴキブリの味)	10	YouTube
November 9, 2019	SIU (しう)	11	YouTube

=== Singles ===
Release date	Title	Chart positions
Release date	Title	Billboard Japan Niconico Vocaloid Songs Top 20
January 18, 2011	Refreshing Weather Cruelty ver (廻天爽快 残虐ver)	—N/a
January 19, 2011	Forced Obedience (強制隷従)	—N/a
February 24, 2011	♂♀ (♂♀♂♂♀♂♀)	—N/a
March 3, 2011	Lose Weight, Fatty lol (デブは痩せろwww)	—N/a
March 6, 2011	I'm a Part-timer lol (あたしバイト！！ww)	—N/a
March 8, 2011	Childish adult (コドモなオトナ。)	—N/a
March 11, 2011	My boyfriend died (彼氏が死んじゃった。)	—N/a
March 19, 2011	I'm a NEET lol (あたしニート！！www)	—N/a
April 4, 2011	Try to Say the P Names! (P 名 言 っ て み ろ ！)	—N/a
April 10, 2011	Try to Say Akibawota-P (アキバヲタP言ってみろ)	—N/a
April 13, 2011	Try to Say the P Names! Full Version (P名言ってみろ！完全版)	—N/a
March 13, 2011	Try to Say the Family Names! (姓 名 言 っ て み ろ ！)	—N/a
May 23, 2011	Teretterettee (てれってれってー)	—N/a
June 3, 2011	Give me wings (翼をください)	—N/a
June 10, 2011	24KEYs	—N/a
June 18, 2011	Anti-VOCALOID (アンチボーカロイド)	—N/a
August 14, 2011	Inori (いのり)	—N/a
September 7, 2011	Let's say the schools names (校 名 言 っ て み ろ ！)	—N/a
February 10, 2012	Road Roller (ロードローラー)	—N/a
January 23, 2013	Tehamint (テーハミント)	—N/a
Sep 20, 2013	Brain Revolution Girl! (脳内革命ガール)	—N/a
December 27, 2016	Dokuhaku (ドクハク)	—N/a
May 8, 2018	Yumesusabi (ゆめすさび)	—N/a
September 26, 2019	Yamitsuki (ヤミツキ)	—N/a
May 21, 2021	Namida (ナミダ)	—N/a
July 25, 2021	Pink (ぴんく)	—N/a
December 27, 2021	New Darling (ニューダーリン)	—N/a
July 28, 2023	Aishite ita no ni (あいしていたのに)	—N/a
November 1, 2023	Bakushoku Outo Everyday (爆食嘔吐Everyday)	—N/a
November 10, 2023	Angel 92 (エンゼル92)	4
February 16, 2024	Inochi no Odori (いのちのおどり)	—N/a
March 23, 2024	Binomi (ビノミ)	8
May 3, 2024	Iya Iya yo (イヤイヤヨ)	10
December 27, 2024	Nyan (ニャン)	10
December 30, 2025	Fascinator (ファシネイター)	1

=== Covers/remixes ===
Release date	Title	Original by
January 25, 2011	Set to Fail (せっと・とぅ・ふぇいる)	Lamb of God
February 4, 2011	Motto Hageshiku Furefure (もっと激しくふれふれ)	Karimono
February 9, 2011	Zetsu (ミクにガゼットを歌わせてみた)	The GazettE
March 21, 2011	Compensated dating (援助交際)	OkameP
March 21, 2011	Desire_for...	バスドラ連打P
March 26, 2011	Saisei (再生)	Utsu-P
March 28, 2011	World's end Dancehall (ワールズエンド・タンスホール)	wowaka
June 19, 2011	Bat Country	Avenged Sevenfold
June 26, 2011	I Covered 8 Divine Songs Togethere (神曲８曲まとめてカバーしてみた)	Various
August 12, 2011	Get home, Take a shower, Eat spahgetti (カエッテ シャワッテ スッパゲレ)	KIT
April 27, 2012	ROCKET DIVE	Hide
January 6, 2017	DISAPPEARANCE ADDICTION (イナイイナイ依存症)	Kairiki Bear
January 19, 2017	Dokuhaku (ドクハク)	Maretu (self cover)
April 26, 2017	Everything is an Illusion (すべてはまぼろし)	ポッジーニ
January 13, 2018	Saien (再演)	蛸背あかり
April 28, 2018	FAKE FAKE PSYCHOTROPIC -XIV- (マネマネサイコトロピック -XIV-)	Kairiki Bear
August 19, 2019	Failure Girl (失敗作少女)	Kairiki Bear
January 15, 2020	Venom (ベノム)	Kairiki Bear
June 26, 2021	Angel (アンヘル)	Kairiki Bear
February 28, 2024	......	x0o0x_
