= Mirror (Ado song) =

Single by Ado

from the album Zanmu
- Language: Japanese; English
- Released: May 31, 2024
- Length: 2:58
- Label: Virgin
- Songwriter: Natori
- Producer: Natori

Ado singles chronology
"Value" (2024)	"Mirror" (2024)	"Rule" (2024)

Music video
- "Mirror" on YouTube

"Mirror" (stylized in all caps) is a song recorded by Japanese singer Ado from her second studio album, Zanmu (2024). It was released on May 31, 2024, through Virgin Music. The song was written and produced by Natori.

== Composition ==
"Mirror" has been described as a groovy dance number led by a funky bassline.

== Music video ==
The music video was released on YouTube on May 31, 2024, directed by KZM. The video features animated characters dancing, reflecting the song's themes of self-reflection and connection.

== Personnel ==
- Ado – vocals
- Natori – lyrics, composition, arrangement, drum programming
- Leon Nishizuki – bass
- Haruno – drum programming
- Naoki Itai – mixing

== Charts ==
Chart performance for "Mirror"
Chart (2024)	Peak position
Japan (Japan Hot 100)	44
Japan Digital Singles (Oricon)	8
US World Digital Song Sales (Billboard)	6
