= Ado (singer) =

Japanese singer (born 2002)

- Born: October 24, 2002 (age 24); Tokyo, Japan
- Genres: J-pop; rock; electronic; dance
- Occupation: Singer
- Instruments: Vocals; guitar
- Years active: 2017–present
- Labels: Virgin; Geffen; Capitol
- Website: www.universal-music.co.jp/ado/

Ado (Note: Japanese pronunciation: [aꜜdo], as in the kyōgen term. The closest English approximation would be /ˈɑːdoʊ/ (AH-doh) or /ˈɑːdɔː/ (AH-daw).) (born October 24, 2002) is a Japanese singer. In 2020, at the age of 17, she made her debut with "Usseewa", which peaked at number 1 on Billboard Japan Hot 100, Oricon Digital Singles Chart, and the Oricon Streaming Chart. The song reached 100 million plays on Billboard Japan within 17 weeks of charting, which was the sixth fastest in history and made her the youngest to achieve the milestone as a solo singer. In 2022, her song "New Genesis" was used as the theme song for the animated film One Piece Film: Red and topped Apple Music's Global Top 100 charts. Her 2025 Hibana World Tour has been credited as the largest global tour by a Japanese artist.

She is represented by the artist management company Cloud Nine.

== Life and career ==
The blue rose is a symbol for Ado, signifying "wishes coming true."

=== Early life and musical beginnings: 2002–2026 ===
Ado was born on October 24, 2002, in Tokyo, Japan.

In 2014, Ado took an interest in music after software for the video-sharing website Niconico was released on the Nintendo 3DS. She began watching videos on the small screen of the handheld game console, and was impressed by cover singers on Niconico who sang without showing their faces.

In 2017, Ado began singing as an utaite (an internet cover singer) on Niconico, beginning with uploading a video of herself singing a cover of "Kimi no Taion" on January 10, 2017. On Nippon TV, she said that during the time she was an utaite singer, she covered her closet in soundproofing material that she bought online and recorded in.

In 2019, she featured in Kujira's digital single "Kinmokusei", which was released on December 23, 2019. A couple months later, she featured as a vocalist in a digital single "Shikabanēze" by Jon-Yakitory, which was released on March 29, 2020. In May 2020, she participated in Pony Canyon's compilation album Palette4. She recorded two songs for the album, "Call Boy" by Syudou and "Taema Naku Ai iro" by Shishi Shishi.

=== Major label debut and first album: 2020–2022 ===
On October 15, 2020, Ado announced that she would make her debut with Universal Music Japan sublabel Virgin Music. On October 23, the day before her 18th birthday, she released her debut single "Usseewa" written by Vocaloid producer Syudou. The music video, released on her YouTube channel, reached 5 million views by November 14. On December 10, 2020, "Usseewa" ranked number 1 on Spotify Viral 50 Japan. On December 24, she released her second single "Readymade" written by Vocaloid producer Surii, as a digital release.

By January 23, 2021, "Usseewa" had reached 40 million views on YouTube, and on February 3, 2021, it ranked number 1 on both Oricon Digital Singles Chart and Oricon Streaming Chart. On February 14, she released her third single, "Gira Gira", written by Vocaloid producer teniwoha, as a digital release. Four days later on February 18, the number of subscribers on her YouTube channel exceeded 1 million. On March 15, 2021, "Usseewa" reached number one on the Billboard Japan Hot 100, and on March 20, the music video on YouTube reached 100 million views, 148 days after its release. On March 29, "Usseewa" reached 100 million plays on the Billboard Japan Streaming Songs chart after 17 weeks from its initial debut, which was the sixth fastest in history and the youngest for a solo singer. On April 27, 2021, Ado released her fourth single "Odo", which was used in an NHK show about Vocaloid producers.

On June 11, 2021, she was chosen as the second Japanese female artist for "YouTube's Artist on the Rise". On June 14, 2021, she released her fifth single, "Yoru no Pierrot". Her sixth single "Aitakute" was released on August 12. She collaborated with Jon-Yakitory on "Rasen", the theme song of the video game Lost Judgment.

In October, Ado announced her debut studio album, Kyōgen. Released on January 26, 2022, Kyōgen sold over 140,000 physical copies in Japan during its first week, a first for a female Japanese artist since Superfly's 2008 self titled debut album. Debuting at number one on both the Billboard Japan Hot Albums chart and the Oricon Albums chart, Ado become the first woman to have a debut album peak at number one on its first week on Japanese charts since Miwa's 2011 studio album, Guitarissimo.

=== Growing international success: 2022–present ===
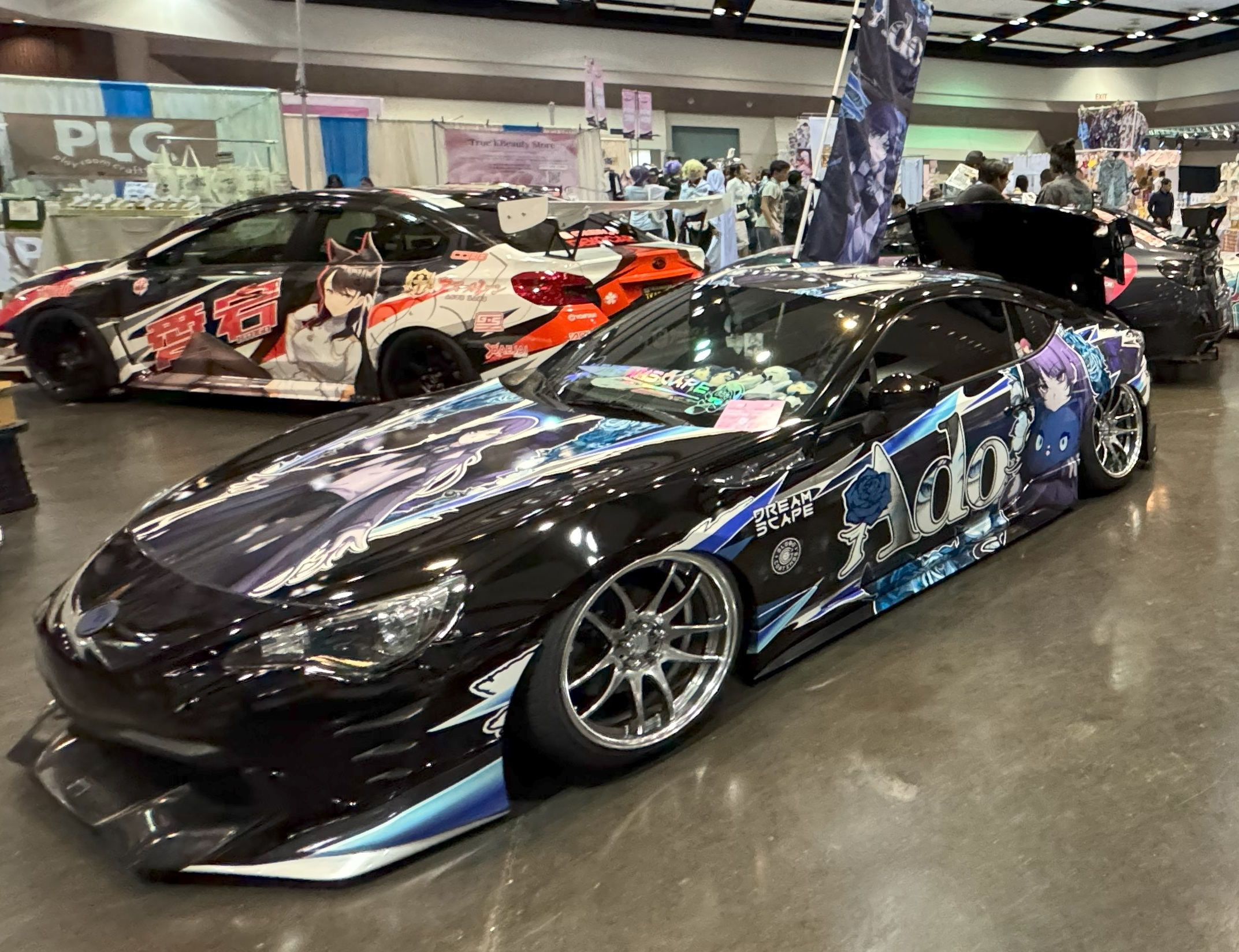
An Ado-themed itasha in 2025

On June 8, 2022, the cast for the Japanese animated film One Piece Film: Red was revealed. Amongst the cast, Ado was revealed as the singing voice actress for the character Uta while Kaori Nazuka reprised her role for Uta's non-singing parts. On the same day, Ado released "New Genesis", the image song for the film. "New Genesis" was a commercial success on various charts, peaking at number one on the Japan Hot 100 and number 20 on the Billboard Global 200. On Apple Music, Ado became the first artist to have a Japanese song top their Global Top 100 chart. She released another song, "I'm Invincible" two weeks later, which eventually peaked at number two on the Japan Hot 100 and number three on the Oricon Combined Singles chart. In August, Ado released the soundtrack album Uta's Songs: One Piece Film Red. The album later became a global success on various charts. On Japanese charts, Ado become the first artist to occupy the top three rankings of the Billboard Japan Hot 100 with "New Genesis", "I'm Invincible" and "Backlight" respectively. She later broke her own record, having five songs from the album chart in the top 5 of the Japan Hot 100. On the Oricon charts, Ado became the first artist in Oricon history to have five songs chart in the top 5 of the Streaming chart. Following this, Ado signed with Geffen Records to distribute the album worldwide.

Near the end of 2022, Ado released the singles "Rebellion" and "Missing". From December 2022 to January 2023, she embarked on her first tour in Japan, the Mirage tour. From June 2023 to September 2023, Ado embarked on her second tour, Mars, which lasted for 14 shows in 11 different locations across Japan. On August 3, 2023, Ado was featured on the Japanese version of "Unforgiven" by Le Sserafim and Nile Rodgers. In September 2023, Ado released "Show", commissioned by Universal Studios Japan to promote their Halloween event, Halloween Horror Nights. "Show" became a commercial success, becoming her third number-one single. In October 2023, she released "Kura Kura" which was used as the opening theme of the second season of anime adaptation of Spy × Family. Ado announced her first world tour, "Wish", on her 21st birthday; it lasted from February to April 2024.

In December 2023, Ado released her first utattemita (歌ってみた; lit. 'I tried singing') album, Ado's Utattemita Album, which included covers of Ringo Sheena's "Tsumi to Batsu", PinocchioP's "God-ish", Akina Nakamori's "Kazari ja Nai no yo Namida wa", and TK's "Unravel". The album went on to peak at number two on the Oricon Albums chart and number one on the Billboard Japan Hot Albums chart.

On April 27 and 28, 2024, Ado held two solo live performances called "Shinzou (心臓, shinzou)" at the Japan National Stadium, becoming the first solo female artist to do so.

On June 26, 2024, the idol group Phantom Siita, which Ado produced, made their debut with the single "Otomodachi".

In July 2024, Ado released her second studio album, Zanmu. Preceded by 14 singles, the album debuted at number one on both the Oricon and Billboard Japan charts. Zanmu became Ado's fourth consecutive number one album on the Japan Hot Albums chart and her second number one album on the Oricon Albums chart.

In October 2024, Ado announced her second world tour, the Hibana World Tour, taking place from April to August 2025 across multiple continents. Drawing over 500,000 attendees across 33 cities worldwide, the tour has been credited as the largest global tour by a Japanese artist.

On December 16, 2024, Imagine Dragons released a remix of their song "Take Me to the Beach" featuring Ado.

In February 2025, it was announced that Ado would take part in the tribute compilation album Meikyo: Tribute to Akina Nakamori, which includes her cover of Nakamori's 1984's single "Jukkai (1984)". In addition, she was also appointed as a brand ambassador for Georgia Coffee. Her song "Bouquet for Me" was featured as the commercial theme song, and she also participated in the commercial as the narrator. In April, Ado released her first greatest hits album, Ado's Best Adobum.

In July 2025, Ado was ranked as the most-streamed Japanese artist outside of Japan in Spotify's mid-year rankings, with nearly 80% of her streams coming from outside of Japan. It marked the first time she topped the category, ending Yoasobi's four-year streak in the position. On July 10, Ado announced that she will be having her first-ever dome tour, Yodaka, to wrap up her 5th debut anniversary with shows in Japan big cities such as Tokyo and Osaka. On July 28, Ado announced that she would provide the theme song for The Silent Service: The Great Sea Battle of the Arctic Ocean, "The Story of the Wind and I", with lyrics by Hiroji Miyamoto and arrangement by Mafumafu.

In a press release on August 25, 2025, Ado's staff revealed she would provide the theme song for the Japanese original net animation reboot of Cat's Eye, "Magic", with lyrics and music by Vocaloid producer Tsumiki. She also provided the ending theme, a cover of Anri's "Cat's Eye", which was originally used as the first opening theme of the 1983 anime adaptation.

In January 2026, Ado was transferred to Universal Japan's Capitol Records division. On February 24, 2026, the biography Vivarium: Ado and Me was released. An accompanying song "Vivarium", which serves as a tie-in with the biography, was released on February 18. The music video for "Vivarium", which was released on February 28, was her first live action music video, featuring several scenes where her face is mostly unobscured.

On March 16, 2026, Ado released "Ai Ai A", which was written by Kikuo. The song premiered on The First Take and was later added digitally on that same day. On April 22, 2026, Ado released the single "Kira" as the official song for the Japan national football team to support their run in the 2026 FIFA World Cup. The official music video was uploaded on Ado's YouTube channel. In June, Ado partnered with Adidas to release a special football jersey as part of the "You Got This" campaign to support the Japan team.

In June 2026, Ado signed with WME Group to represent her outside of Japan.

Ado's song "Love Me Forever!", written by Japanese singer-songwriter Tsunku, was featured in the 2026 video game produced by Tsunku, Rhythm Heaven Groove as the soundtrack to one of its various rhythm based minigames.

Ado was cast as the character Keiko Shirai in the 2027 video game Stranger Than Heaven, and also co-performed the theme song with Snoop Dogg, Satoshi Fujihara of the band Official Hige Dandism, and Tori Kelly.

On August 7, 2026, Ado released "Monstruo", which serves as the official theme song for the live-action Blue Lock film which premiered on the same day. She released the song "DND", in collaboration with Sanrio mascot character Kuromi, on September 25, 2026.

== Artistry ==
=== Influences ===
Ado's earliest musical influence was Vocaloid music, which she discovered during her early childhood. Citing Hatsune Miku as her biggest influence, she discussed with NME that "Vocaloid really is who I am. It's all of me." In an interview with Collider, Ado cited American rock band Kiss and British rock band Queen as one of her early influences.

=== Musical styles ===
Ado's discography spans J-pop, rock, dance and electronic genres. The First Times reported her being able to "sing a wide range of genres, from rock, electronic, ballads and hip-hop". Described as an utaite artist, Ado's debut album, Kyōgen, primarily has been described by journalists as a J-pop and rock record with "electro numbers". Kylie Northover of The Sydney Morning Herald detailed Ado's debut single "Usseewa" as a "punk-influenced song". Northover noted that "Part of Ado's appeal is that she traverses the musical gamut from punk vitriol to softly sung balladry – sometimes in one song." On her soundtrack album Uta's Songs: One Piece Film Red, Ado explored synth-pop sounds with "New Genesis", while on "Fleeting Lullaby", she explored rapping.

== Personal life ==
Little factual knowledge is available about Ado's personal life. In a 2024 interview with The Guardian, Ado explained her decision to not show her face is tied with the Vocaloid scene and for more focus on her artistry.

== Discography ==
=== Albums ===
==== Studio albums ====
List of studio albums, with selected chart positions and certifications
Title	Album details	Peak chart positions			Sales	Certifications
Title	Album details	JPN	JPN Comb.	JPN Hot	Sales	Certifications
Kyōgen	Released: January 26, 2022; Label: Virgin; Format: CD, CD+DVD, digital download, streaming	1	1	1	JPN: 262,557 (CD); JPN: 44,935 (DL)	RIAJ: Platinum (phy.)
Zanmu	Released: July 10, 2024; Label: Virgin; Format: CD, digital download, streaming	1	1	1	JPN: 100,981 (CD)	RIAJ: Gold (phy.)

==== Soundtrack albums ====
List of soundtrack albums, with selected chart positions and certifications
Title	Album details	Peak chart positions						Sales	Certifications
Title	Album details	JPN	JPN Comb.	JPN Hot	BEL (WA)	FRA	US Heat.	Sales	Certifications
Uta's Songs: One Piece Film Red	Released: August 10, 2022; Label: Virgin; Format: CD, digital download, streaming	2	1	1	168	97	9	JPN: 317,513 (CD); JPN: 108,337 (DL)	RIAJ: Platinum (phy.)

==== Compilation albums ====
List of compilation albums, with selected chart positions and certifications
Title	Album details	Peak chart positions					Sales	Certifications
Title	Album details	JPN	JPN Comb.	JPN Hot	FRA	US World	Sales	Certifications
Ado's Utattemita Album	Released: December 13, 2023; Label: Virgin; Format: CD, digital download, streaming	2	2	1	—	—	JPN: 70,300 (CD)	RIAJ: Gold (phy.)
Ado "Ready for My Show Playlist"	Released: February 6, 2024; Label: UME; Format: Digital download, streaming	—	—	—	—	—		
Ado's Best Adobum	Released: April 9, 2025; Label: Virgin; Format: CD, digital download, streaming	1	1	2	133	9	JPN: 133,300 (CD)	RIAJ: Platinum (phy.)
Ado's Utattemita Album 2	Scheduled release: December 23, 2026; Label: Capitol; Format: CD, digital download, streaming	TBA	TBA	TBA	TBA	TBA		
"—" denotes items that did not chart.

==== Remix albums ====
List of remix albums, with selected chart positions and certifications
Title	Album details	Peak chart positions		Sales
Title	Album details	JPN Dig.	JPN Hot	Sales
Show LP	Released: September 6, 2024; Label: Virgin; Format: Digital download, streaming	7	36	JPN: 587 (dig.)

=== Singles ===
==== As lead artist ====
List of singles as lead artist, with selected chart positions, certifications, and sales, showing year released and album name
Title	Year	Peak chart positions					Certifications	Album
Title	Year	JPN	JPN Comb.	JPN Hot (Note: Sources for chart positions are as follows: "Usseewa", "Readymade", "Gira Gira", "Odo", "Yoru no Pierrot", "Aitakute", "Asura-chan", "Eien no Akuruhi", "I'm Invincible", "New Genesis" + "Backlight" + "Fleeting Lullaby", "I'm Invincible", "Rebellion", "Missing", "I'm a Controversy", "Ibara", "Himawari", "Show" and "Dignity", "Kura Kura", "All Night Radio", "Unravel", "Chocolat Cadabra", "Value", "Mirror", "Rule", "Shoka", "Sakura Biyori and Time Machine", "Episode X", "Elf", "Bouquet for Me", "The Story of the Wind and I", "Magic", "Vivarium", "Haru ni Mau", "Monstruo", "Suki de Ite")	US World	WW	Certifications	Album
"Usseewa"	2020	—	2	1	—	41	RIAJ: Platinum (dig.); 3× Platinum (st.)	Kyōgen
"Readymade"	2020	—	—	65	—	—	RIAJ: Platinum (st.)	Kyōgen
"Gira Gira"	2021	—	14	12	—	— (Note: "Gira Gira" did not enter the Billboard Global 200, but peaked at number 152 on the Global Excl. US.)	RIAJ: Gold (dig.); 2× Platinum (st.)	Kyōgen
"Odo"	2021	—	6	4	—	122	RIAJ: Gold (dig.); 3× Platinum (st.)	Kyōgen
"Yoru no Pierrot" (夜のピエロ)	2021	—	17	13	—	—	RIAJ: Gold (st.)	Kyōgen
"Aitakute" (会いたくて)	2021	—	45	27	—	—	RIAJ: Gold (st.)	Kyōgen
"Ashura-chan" (阿修羅ちゃん)	2021	—	8	5	—	— (Note: "Ashura-chan" did not enter the Billboard Global 200, but peaked at number 80 on the Global Excl. US.)	RIAJ: Gold (dig.); 2× Platinum (st.)	Kyōgen
"Eien no Akuruhi" (永遠のあくる日)	2022	—	—	35	—	—		Zanmu
"New Genesis"	2022	—	1	1	9	20	RIAJ: Platinum (dig.); Diamond (st.)	Uta's Songs
"I'm Invincible"	2022	—	3	2	—	74	RIAJ: Gold (dig.); 3× Platinum (st.)	Uta's Songs
"Backlight" (逆光)	2022	—	2	2	—	73	RIAJ: Gold (dig.); 2× Platinum (st.)	Uta's Songs
"Rebellion" (リベリオン)	2022	—	33	20	—	—	RIAJ: Gold (st.)	Zanmu
"Missing" (行方知れず)	2022	—	39	25	—	—		Zanmu
"I'm a Controversy" (アタシは問題作)	2023	—	39	27	—	—		Zanmu
"Ibara"	2023	—	—	38	—	—		Zanmu
"Himawari"	2023	—	24	19	—	—	RIAJ: Platinum (st.)	Zanmu
"Show"	2023	—	1	1	—	44	RIAJ: Gold (dig.); 3× Platinum (st.)	Zanmu
"Dignity"	2023	—	—	34	—	—		Zanmu
"Kura Kura"	2023	—	18	9	—	—	RIAJ: Platinum (st.)	Zanmu
"All Night Radio"	2023	—	—	99	—	—		Zanmu
"Unravel"	2023	—	—	50	—	—		Ado's Utattemita Album
"Dawn and Fireflies" (夜明けと蛍)	2023	—	—	—	—	—		Ado's Utattemita Album
"Chocolat Cadabra"	2024	—	38	31	—	—		Zanmu
"Value"	2024	—	—	45	—	—		Zanmu
"Mirror"	2024	—	— (Note: "Mirror" did not enter the Oricon Combined Singles chart, but peaked at number 8 on the Oricon Digital Singles Chart.)	44	6	—		Zanmu
"Rule" (ルル)	2024	—	— (Note: "Rule" did not enter the Oricon Combined Singles chart, but peaked at number 12 on the Oricon Digital Singles Chart.)	40	—	—		Zanmu
"Shoka" (初夏)	2024	3	3	63	—	—		Ado's Best Adobum
"Sakura Biyori and Time Machine" (桜日和とタイムマシン) (with Hatsune Miku)	2024	3	3	15	—	—		Ado's Best Adobum
"Episode X"	2024	—	— (Note: "Episode X" did not enter the Oricon Combined Singles chart, but peaked at number 3 on the Oricon Digital Singles Chart.)	39	—	—		Ado's Best Adobum
"Elf" (エルフ)	2025	—	41	32	—	—		Ado's Best Adobum
"Bouquet for Me" (わたしに花束)	2025	—	—	40	—	—		Ado's Best Adobum
"The Story of the Wind and I" (風と私の物語)	2025	—	—	17	—	—		Non-album singles
"Magic"	2025	—	—	37	10	—		Non-album singles
"Angelseek" (エンゼルシーク)	2026	—	—	—	—	—		Non-album singles
"Vivarium"	2026	14	—	26	—	—		Non-album singles
"Ai Ai A" (アイ·アイ·ア)	2026	—	—	—	—	—		Non-album singles
"Haru ni Mau" (春に舞う)	2026	—	—	38	—	—		Non-album singles
"Monstruo" (モンストロ)	2026	—	—	10	—	—		Non-album singles
"Suki de Ite" (好きでいて)	2026	—	—	26	—	—		Non-album singles
"Shinka" (シンカ)	2026	—	—	—	—	—		Non-album singles
"—" denotes items that did not chart or items that were ineligible to chart because no physical edition was released.

==== As featured artist ====
List of singles as featured artist, showing year released and album name
Title	Year	Album
"Osmanthus" (金木犀) (Whale Don't Sleep featuring Ado)	2019	Nere Nai Yoru ni Kāten o Akete
"Shikabanēze" (シカバネーゼ) (Jon-Yakitory featuring Ado)	2020	Non-album singles
"Anemone" (Toiki featuring Ado)	2020	Non-album singles
"Stick Candy" (Nagumo Yūki featuring Ado)	2020	Non-album singles
"Tokyo Cannibalism" (東亰カニバリズム) (Biz featuring Ado)	2020	Non-album singles
"Eat" (イート) (Jon-Yakitory featuring Ado)	2020	Non-album singles
"Freudmeta" (フロイトメタ) (Biz featuring Ado)	2020	Non-album singles
"Oshare Banchō" (お洒落番長) (Linmu featuring Ado)	2020	Non-album singles
"Shake It Now" (Nakimushi featuring Ado)	2020	Rendez-vous
"Faking of Comedy" (フェイキング・オブ・コメディ) (Jon-Yakitory featuring Ado)	2020	Non-album singles
"Love ka?" (ラブカ？) (Hīragi Kirai featuring Ado)	2020	Non-album singles
"Radio Noise" (Miko Kichi featuring Ado)	2021	Non-album singles
"Fool Fool Fool" (フールフールフール) (Hosomichi Okuno featuring Ado)	2021	Non-album singles
"AntiSystem's" (アンチシステム's) (Jon-Yakitory featuring Ado)	2021	Non-album singles
"Rasen" (蝸旋) (Jon-Yakitory featuring Ado)	2021	Non-album singles
"Unforgiven" (Japanese version) (Le Sserafim featuring Nile Rodgers and Ado)	2023	Unforgiven
"Take Me to the Beach" (remix) (Imagine Dragons featuring Ado)	2024	Loom
"Stay Gold" (Jax Jones featuring Ado)	2025	Non-album single

==== Promotional singles ====
List of promotional singles, with selected chart positions, showing year released and album name
Title	Year	Peak chart positions			Certifications	Album
Title	Year	JPN Comb.	JPN Hot (Note: Sources for chart positions are as follows: "Kokoro to iu Na no Fukakai", "Senbonzakura", "Buriki no Dance", "Rockstar", "Charles", "Cat's Eye", "Odoru Pompokolin")	WW	Certifications	Album
"Kokoro to Iu Na no Fukakai" (心という名の不可解)	2022	13	11	—	RIAJ: Platinum (st.)	Kyōgen
"Senbonzakura" (千本桜)	2022	— (Note: "Senbonzakura" did not enter the Oricon Combined Singles chart, but peaked at number 11 on the Oricon Digital Singles Chart.)	59	—		10 Shūnen Kinen Album All That Senbonzakura!!!
"Fleeting Lullaby" (ウタカタララバイ)	2022	4	5	101	RIAJ: 2× Platinum (st.)	Uta's Songs
"Buriki no Dance" (ブリキノダンス)	2023	—	88	—		Ado's Utattemita Album
"Kitto Coaster" (きっとコースター)	2024	—	—	—		Non-album single
"Nukegara" (抜け空)	2024	—	—	—		Zanmu
"Rockstar" (ロックスター)	2025	—	93	—		Ado's Best Adobum
"Hello Signals"	2025	—	—	—		Ado's Best Adobum
"Charles" (シャルル)	2025	—	86	—		Fall Apart
"Aishite Aishite Aishite" (愛して愛して愛して)	2025	—	—	—		Ado's Utattemita Album
"Jukkai (1984) (十戒 (1984))"	2025	—	— (Note: "Jukkai (1984)" did not enter the Billboard Japan Hot 100 chart, but peaked at number 40 on the Billboard Japan Download Songs chart.)	—		Meikyo
"GeGeGe no Kitarō" (ゲゲゲの鬼太郎)	2025	—	— (Note: "GeGeGe no Kitarō" did not enter the Billboard Japan Hot 100 chart, but peaked at number 32 on the Billboard Japan Download Songs chart.)	—		Non-album singles
"Cat's Eye"	2025	—	59	—		Non-album singles
"Odoru Pompokolin" (おどるポンポコリン)	2025	—	78	—		Non-album singles
"Kira" (綺羅)	2026	—	—	—		Non-album singles
"Love Me Forever!"	2026	—	—	—		Non-album singles
"DND"	2026	—	—	—		Non-album singles
"Patient A" (患者A)	2026	—	—	—		Non-album singles
"—" denotes items that did not chart.

=== Other charted songs ===
List of other charted songs, with selected chart positions, showing year released and album name
Title	Year	Peak chart positions			Certifications	Album
Title	Year	JPN Comb.	JPN Hot (Note: Sources for chart positions are as follows: "Tot Musica" + "The World's Continuation" + "Where the Wind Blows" + "Binks' Sake",)	WW	Certifications	Album
"Domestic de Violence" (ドメスティックでバイオレンス)	2022	—	— (Note: "Domestic de Violence" did not enter the Billboard Japan Hot 100 chart, but peaked at number 64 on the Billboard Japan Download Songs chart.)	—		Kyōgen
"Fireworks" (花火)	2022	—	— (Note: "Fireworks" did not enter the Billboard Japan Hot 100 chart, but peaked at number 63 on the Billboard Japan Download Songs chart.)	—		Kyōgen
"Kagakushu" (過学習)	2022	—	— (Note: "Kagakushu" did not enter the Billboard Japan Hot 100 chart, but peaked at number 98 on the Billboard Japan Download Songs chart.)	—		Kyōgen
"Motherland" (マザーランド)	2022	—	— (Note: "Motherland" did not enter the Billboard Japan Hot 100 chart, but peaked at number 76 on the Billboard Japan Download Songs chart.)	—		Kyōgen
"Tot Musica"	2022	6	6	134	RIAJ: Gold (st.)	Uta's Songs
"The World's Continuation" (世界のつづき)	2022	13	12	— (Note: "The World's Continuation" did not enter the Billboard Global 200, but peaked at number 165 on the Global Excl. US.)	RIAJ: Platinum (st.)	Uta's Songs
"Where the Wind Blows" (風のゆくえ)	2022	11	10	— (Note: "Where the Wind Blows" did not enter the Billboard Global 200, but peaked at number 121 on the Global Excl. US.)	RIAJ: Platinum (st.)	Uta's Songs
"Binks' Sake" (ビンクスの酒)	2022	30	31	—	RIAJ: Gold (st.)	Uta's Songs
"Crime and Punishment" (罪と罰)	2023	—	— (Note: "Crime and Punishment" did not enter the Billboard Japan Hot 100 chart, but peaked at number 41 on the Billboard Japan Download Songs chart.)	—		Ado's Utattemita Album
"Dried Flower" (ドライフラワー)	2023	—	— (Note: "Dried Flowers" did not enter the Billboard Japan Hot 100 chart, but peaked at number 19 on the Billboard Japan Download Songs chart.)	—		Ado's Utattemita Album
"God-ish" (神っぽいな)	2023	—	— (Note: "God-ish" did not enter the Billboard Japan Hot 100 chart, but peaked at number 47 on the Billboard Japan Download Songs chart.)	—		Ado's Utattemita Album
"Kawaikute Gomen" (可愛くてごめん)	2023	—	— (Note: "God-ish" did not enter the Billboard Japan Hot 100 chart, but peaked at number 27 on the Billboard Japan Download Songs chart.)	—		Ado's Utattemita Album
"Kazari ja Nai no yo Namida wa" (飾りじゃないのよ涙は)	2023	—	— (Note: "Kazari ja Nai no yo Namida wa" did not enter the Billboard Japan Hot 100 chart, but peaked at number 40 on the Billboard Japan Download Songs chart.)	—		Ado's Utattemita Album
"Villain" (ヴィラン)	2023	—	— (Note: "Villain" did not enter the Billboard Japan Hot 100 chart, but peaked at number 98 on the Billboard Japan Download Songs chart.)	—		Ado's Utattemita Album
"—" denotes items that did not chart.

=== Video albums ===
List of media, with selected chart positions
Title	Album details	Peak chart positions
Title	Album details	JPN DVD
Campanella (カムパネルラ)	Released: June 21, 2023; Label: Virgin; Format: DVD, Blu-ray	1
Mars (マーズ)	Released: April 10, 2024; Label: Virgin; Format: DVD, Blu-ray	1
Shinzou (心臓)	Released: December 25, 2024; Label: Virgin; Format: DVD, Blu-ray	4
Profile of Mona Lisa (モナ・リザの横顔)	Released: October 22, 2025; Label: Virgin; Format: DVD, Blu-ray	2
Hibana	Released: March 25, 2026; Label: Capitol; Format: DVD, Blu-ray	3 (Note: Chart ranking for the limited edition of Hibana.)
Yodaka (よだか)	Released: October 21, 2026; Label: Capitol; Format: DVD, Blu-ray	1

== Music videos ==
Release date	Song title	Movie Director
October 23, 2020	Usseewa	Wooma
December 24, 2020	Readymade	Yasutatsu
February 14, 2021	Gira Gira	Numata Zombi
April 27, 2021	Odo	Kayuka
June 14, 2021	Yoru no Pierrot	Jinguji
August 12, 2021	Aitakute	Mono-Devoid
October 28, 2021	Ashura-chan	Mono-Devoid
January 17, 2022	KokoroToIuNanoFukakai	Akito Nakayama
January 26, 2022	Fireworks	goru
March 6, 2022	Kagakushū	Saki Naito
March 14, 2022	Eien No Akuruhi	nanon
March 26, 2022	Domestic De Violence	Akito Nakayama
May 8, 2022	Motherland	yasutatsu
May 8, 2022	Lucky Bruto	Akito Nakayama
June 15, 2022	New Genesis	hmng
June 22, 2022	I'm invincible	Ai Nina
July 6, 2022	Backlight	Hironobu Nagasawa
August 6, 2022	Fleeting Lullaby	Wotakichi (NIN)
August 10, 2022	The World's Continuation	Sto1e
August 17, 2022	Tot Musica	Wooma
August 24, 2022	Where the Wind Blows	Chie Miyasaka
September 19, 2022	Rebellion	Kantaro
October 10, 2022	Missing	Sakiyama
October 24, 2022	Freedom	Keigo Inoue
February 20, 2023	I'm a Controversy	Eiri Na Hamono
August 22, 2023	Unforgiven (feat. Nile Rodgers and Ado)	Soonsik Yang
September 6, 2023	Show	Tohru Mitsuhashi
September 28, 2023	Dignity	kairi
October 7, 2023	Kura Kura	KZM
November 11, 2023	All Night Radio	Sohta Ozawa
November 15, 2023	Unravel (cover)	Hano
November 29, 2023	Buriki no Dance (cover)	iga kitty
December 25, 2023	Hello Signals	Kazz Fukuda
January 31, 2024	Chocolat Cadabra	Yoh Yoshinari
February 23, 2024	Value	G-ko
May 31, 2024	Mirror	KZM
July 5, 2024	Rule	Namuru
September 6, 2024	Show (Another Story)	Tohru Mitsuhashi
October 14, 2024	Shoka	mino
October 23, 2024	Sakura Biyori and Time Machine	Saki Naito
December 6, 2024	Episode X	Nina
December 30, 2024	Nukegara	Syamo.G
January 24, 2025	Elf	mino
April 6, 2025	Bouquet for Me	ageha
April 9, 2025	Rock Star	Tohru Mitsuhashi
September 26, 2025	The Story Of The Wind And I	Namuru
October 24, 2025	0	Kazz Fukuda
October 31, 2025	MAGIC	ZIIEK
February 28, 2026	Vivarium	Kyotaro Hayashi, bees inc.
August 6, 2026	Monstruo	Yūki Ōkubo, Mahiru Kurumizawa
October 7, 2026	DND feat. KUROMI	YP
October 16, 2026	Raven Sky	ZIIEK

== Tours ==
One-off performances

- Kigeki (April 4, 2022)
- Campanella (August 11, 2022)
- Shinzou (April 27–28, 2024)
- Expo 2025 (April 13, 2025)
- Zipangu 2026 (May 16, 2026)
- Ao (July 4–5, 2026)
- Lollapalooza aftershow (July 31, 2026)
- Lollapalooza 2026 (August 2, 2026)
- Summer Sonic 2026 (August 15, 2026 - Tokyo, August 16, 2026 - Osaka)
- Rock In Japan Fes. 2026 (upcoming, September 21, 2026)

Concert tours

- Mirage Tour (2022–2023)
- Mars Tour (2023)
- Wish World Tour (2024)
- Profile of Mona Lisa Tour (2024)
- Hibana World Tour (2025)
- Yodaka Dome Tour (2025)

== Awards and nominations ==
Name of the award ceremony, year presented, category, nominee(s) of the award, and the result of the nomination
Award ceremony	Year	Category	Nominee(s)/work(s)	Result	Ref.
Mnet Asian Music Awards	2021	Best New Asian Artist (Japan)	Ado	Won	
MTV Video Music Awards Japan	2021	MTV Breakthrough Song	"Usseewa"	Won	
63rd Japan Record Awards	2021	Special Award	Ado	Won	
Billboard Japan Music Awards	2022	Artist of the Year	Ado	Won	
MTV Video Music Awards Japan	2022	Song of the Year	"New Genesis"	Won	
64th Japan Record Awards	2022	Excellent Work Awards	"New Genesis"	Won	
64th Japan Record Awards	2022	Special Prize	Ado	Won	
7th Crunchyroll Anime Awards	2023	Best Anime Song	"New Genesis"	Nominated	
65th Japan Record Awards	2023	Excellent Work Awards	"Show"	Won	
Music Awards Japan	2026	Largest Live Audience(International)	Ado	Won	
