= Unravel (TK song) =

2014 single by TK from Ling Tosite Sigure

Single by TK from Ling Tosite Sigure

from the album Fantastic Magic
- Language: Japanese
- B-side: "Fu re te Fu re ru"; "Acoustic Installation"
- Released: July 23, 2014
- Studio: 4; Tuppence House I's
- Genre: J-rock; alternative rock; anime song
- Length: 4:00
- Label: Sony Music Associated Records
- Songwriter: Toru Kitajima
- Producer: Toru Kitajima

TK from Ling Tosite Sigure singles chronology
"Unravel" (2014)	"Signal" (2016)

Alternative cover
- Limited edition cover

Music video
- "Unravel" on YouTube

"Unravel" (stylized in all lowercase) is a song by Japanese musician TK from Ling Tosite Sigure. Released as his debut single on July 23, 2014 through Sony Music Associated Records, it served as the opening theme for the first season of the Japanese anime series Tokyo Ghoul. It was later included on his second studio album Fantastic Magic.

== Background and release ==
In January 2014, an adaptation of the manga series Tokyo Ghoul was announced. Later information revealed that it would be produced by Studio Pierrot and directed by Shuhei Morita, being set to air in July of that year.

TK was personally requested by Tokyo Ghoul author Sui Ishida for the opening theme after they met at one of Ling Tosite Sigure's live shows. TK read the manga shortly after and found himself captivated by its story. Upon announcement that he would be performing the opening theme, TK commented:

Ever since the day you came to see my live show, I have slowly followed an invisible thread — only to find myself, before I knew it, drawn into the very same story.

I have endeavored to portray "life" as I see it — a life reflected in the interplay between madness and the fragility that lies in its shadow. Just as I became captivated by the sensation of glimpsing the truth hidden within an illusion, I hope that as many people as possible will experience this world for themselves.

— Toru Kitajima, Natalie

On May 30, a short version of "Unravel" was released on YouTube. The track list for the single was announced on June 17, with the title track being played in its entirely for the first time on the Japanese radio program School of Lock! the following day. The CD single included the title track "Unravel", as well as the B-sides "Fu re te Fu re ru" and "Acoustic Installation", the latter being an instrumental track. It was released on July 23 in three editions: a standard edition, a limited edition including the TV edit of "Unravel", and a first-press limited edition paired with a DVD including seven live performance videos from TK's Killing You Softly solo tour held on March 13. The limited edition cover was illustrated by Ishida and features supporting character Touka Kirishima.

== Composition and lyrics ==
"Unravel" is an alternative rock song, composed in the key of G minor and is set in time signature of common time with a tempo of 135 BPM.

TK saw Tokyo Ghoul as different compared to other works being adapted at the time, driving him to make the "coolest possible music" for the series. He initially submitted an up-tempo track; however, when requested to lean mid-tempo, he composed the piece that ultimately became "Unravel". His label and team expressed doubts about a mid-tempo theme, noting he "[doesn't] remember anyone saying the song would do well". Despite this, he considered the song a perfect complement to the series, describing it as a career high point.

TK said that the song's a capella intro was a stylistic choice. He wished to experiment with his voice, leading him to use a raw tone to "evoke a sense of silence while still being piercing".

The song is written from the perspective of protagonist Ken Kaneki, a college student who becomes a half-ghoul after surviving an attack in a co-existent Tokyo. The lyrics express his anguish of being torn between his human and ghoul identities, unwilling to accept his transformation. The usage of repeated and contradictory phrases throughout the song emphasizes this internal conflict. In the chorus, the "distorted world" characterized by the complicated dynamics between humans and ghouls, coupled with his inner identity struggle, puts him at a crossroads, making him feel "invisible" to everything. At the end of the second verse, the English line "unraveling the world" is shouted, followed by an instrumental break, signifying Kaneki's loss of his stable self as the world he once knew as a human comes apart.

== Commercial performance ==
"Unravel" is TK's most commercially successful song, both in Japan and worldwide. On the Oricon Singles Chart, the song peaked at number nine and charted for 26 total weeks. The song also debuted and peaked at number six on the Billboard Japan Hot 100 and number two on the Hot Animation chart for the week of July 30, 2014, earning TK his first top-ten song on both charts. It also ranked at number 15 on the 2014 year-end Hot Animation chart.

In November 2021, Spotify commemorated its five-year anniversary in Japan by releasing rankings, with "Unravel" topping the list for the most streamed songs by Japanese artists overseas from 2016 to 2021. As of September 2026, it has over 420 million streams on Spotify and is the 15th most-streamed Japanese song of all time on the platform.

== Music video ==
The music video for "Unravel" was directed by Shuichi Banba. A short version of the video was released on July 8, 2014, while the full version was released on July 23, 2020. The video features TK, drummer Hiroyuki "BoBo" Horikawa, bassist Hidekazu "Hinatch" Hinata, pianist Mamiko Hirai, violinist An Suhara, and a dancer performing in a room with screens behind them. At the end of the video, TK is seen displayed on a TV screen in a remote area. The full version of the music video has gained 89 million views as of September 2026.

For the anime adaptation's 10th anniversary, a special collaboration music video for "Unravel" was released on July 3, 2025.

== Remixes and other versions ==
=== "Unravel (Acoustic version)" ===
On May 20, 2015, an acoustic version of the track was released, incorporating piano, cello, and newly recorded vocals. It was originally used as an insert song for the second-season finale of Tokyo Ghoul. It was also included as the B-side to TK's second single, "Signal".

=== "Unravel (From The First Take)" ===
On April 10, 2020, a one-take performance of "Unravel" premiered on The First Take's YouTube channel, featuring TK accompanied by a piano, violin, and cello. It was then later released digitally on July 24, alongside a performance of his song "Copy Light". As of September 2026, the video has garnered over 33 million views.

According to TK, the arrangements of both songs were composed specifically for The First Take. He stated that it was rare for him to record vocals alongside the songs at the same time, thinking "the records were incredibly raw and authentic ... so it felt like we were stepping into uncharted territory".

=== "Unravel (N-buna from Yorushika Remix)" ===
In 2021, a remix titled "Unravel (N-buna from Yorushika Remix)" was released. TK commissioned producer N-buna of Japanese rock duo Yorushika to create the track after it was requested to serve as the theme song for the art exhibition Sui Ishida Exhibition [Tokyo Ghoul → Jack Jeanne]. It was released on February 10 as an exhibition edit, before a full version was released on TK's EP Yesworld on April 14. It was also included on his greatest hits album Egomaniac Feedback.

TK selected N-buna for the remix because he felt "he knew the most beautiful way to deconstruct the song". He elaborated that "[N-buna] perfectly captured that ambiguous boundary where many people want the original but also want it to be deconstructed in some way". In an official comment, N-buna stated he "rearranged 'Unravel' with the aim of further emphasizing the duality of quiet madness and passion it possesses".

A music video for the N-buna remix premiered on April 14, 2021. It was directed by creative team Show+er—led by actor Takayuki Yamada—and stars TK alongside actors Asahi Uchida and Ippei Tanaka. In some scenes, TK plays a vintage Gibson ES-330 owned by N-buna.

=== "Unravel -Instrumental for the 10th Anniversary-" ===
On July 30, 2025, an acoustic instrumental rearrangement of "Unravel" was released to commemorate the 10th anniversary of the anime series. It came out as a digital release and on the limited edition of TK's first instrumental album, "Brain Films -Vinyl Edition-". It features Sara Wakui on piano, Anzu Suhara on strings, and TK on mixing and guitar. A music video was published the same day. Directed by Suntaro, it was filmed in Nagasaki and Tokyo.

== Cover versions ==
Multiple singers have released covers of the song, including Lia, Yumi Matsuzawa, Kanako Takatsuki, Tongo, and Ado. Bands that have covered the song include Mary's Blood and Asterism featuring Norwegian singer PelleK.

== Track listing ==
All tracks are written by Toru Kitajima.

CD single / digital download / streaming – standard edition
No.	Title	Length
1.	"Unravel"	4:00
2.	"Fu re te Fu re ru"	3:38
3.	"Acoustic Installation"	6:04
Total length:		13:44

CD single – limited edition
No.	Title	Length
1.	"Unravel"	4:00
2.	"Fu re te Fu re ru"	3:38
3.	"Acoustic Installation"	6:04
4.	"Unravel" (TV edit)	1:30
Total length:		15:14

DVD – first-press limited edition
No.	Title	Length
1.	"Tsumi no Houseki" (罪の宝石)
2.	"Crazy Kanjou Style" (Crazy感情Style)
3.	"Fourth"
4.	"Seacret Cm"
5.	"White Silence"
6.	"Re:automation"
7.	"Sergio Echigo"
Total length:		38:40

== Credits and personnel ==
Credits adapted from the liner notes.

- Toru Kitajima – vocals (tracks 1, 2), songwriter, guitar, arranger, producer, recording engineer, mixing engineer
- Hiroyuki Horikawa / BoBo – drums (tracks 1, 3)
- Hidekazu Hinata / Hinatch – bass
- Mamiko Hirai – piano
- Takashi Kashikura – drums (track 2)
- Honoka Sato – violin (tracks 1, 3)
- Kei Sakamoto – flute (track 3)
- Fumiaki Unehara – assistant engineer
- Ted Jensen, Mitsuyasu Abe – mastering engineer

== Charts ==
=== Weekly charts ===
Weekly chart performance for "Unravel"
Chart (2014)	Peak position
Japan Hot 100 (Billboard)	6
Japan Hot Animation (Billboard Japan)	2
Japan (Oricon)	9

=== Year-end charts ===
Year-end chart performance for "Unravel"
Chart (2014)	Peak position
Japan Hot Animation (Billboard Japan)	15

== Certifications and sales ==
Region	Certification	Certified units/sales
Japan Physical	—	10,112
Japan (RIAJ) Digital	Platinum	250,000^{*}
Streaming
Japan (RIAJ)	Platinum	100,000,000^{†}
^{*} Sales figures based on certification alone.^{†} Streaming-only figures based on certification alone.

== Awards and nominations ==
Year	Award	Category	Result
2015	Newtype Anime Awards	Best Theme Song	9th place
