= Kura Kura (Ado song) =

Single by Ado

from the album Zanmu
- Language: Japanese
- Released: October 5, 2023
- Genre: Anison
- Length: 3:10
- Label: Virgin
- Songwriter: Meiyo
- Producers: Meiyo; Yoko Kanno

Ado singles chronology
"Dignity" (2023)	"Kura Kura" (2023)	"All Night Radio" (2023)

Music video
- "Kura Kura" on YouTube

"Kura Kura" (Japanese: クラクラ; lit. "dizzy") is a song recorded by Japanese singer Ado, released on October 5, 2023, by Virgin Music. The song serves as the opening theme song for season 2 of Spy × Family.

== Background ==
During an interview, Ado said that she was honored to record the theme song for Spy × Family as she has watched the show for a long time.

== Music video ==
The music video was released on October 7, 2023, the video was illustrated by s!on.

== Personnel ==
Credits adapted from Tidal.

- Ado – vocals
- Meiyo – production, songwriter
- Yoko Kanno – production, recording arrangement
- Masato Honda – alto saxophone
- Takuo Yamamoto – baritone saxophone, tenor saxophone
- Hiroo Yamaguchi – bass
- Yasuo Sano – drums
- Takafumi "Co-K" Kokei – guitar
- Yujiro Yonestu – immersive mixing
- Matt Colton – mastering
- Tom Manning – mixing
- Seatbelt – recording arranger
- Masahi Yabuhara – recording engineer
- Andy Wulf – tenor saxophone
- Shinsuke Torizuka – trombone
- Yoichi Murata – trombone

== Accolades ==
Awards and nominations for "Kura Kura"
Ceremony	Year	Award	Result	Ref.
Reiwa Anisong Awards	2023	Composition Award (Note: Meiyo credited as nominee.)	Nominated	

== Charts ==
Weekly chart performance for "Kura Kura"
Chart (2023)	Peak position
Japan (Japan Hot 100)	9
Japan Combined Singles (Oricon)	18

== Certifications ==
Certifications for "Kura Kura"
Region	Certification	Certified units/sales
Japan (RIAJ)	Platinum	100,000,000^{†}
^{†} Streaming-only figures based on certification alone.
