= Jon-Yakitory =

jon-YAKITORY
- Origin: Japan
- Genre: J-pop
- Instrument: Vocaloid
- Years active: 2013–present
- Labels: Saihate Records; Napolitan jon

YouTube information
- Channel: jon-YAKITORY
- Years active: 2013–present
- Subscribers: 314. thousand
- Views: 168 million
- Last updated: August 11, 2025

Jon-Yakitory (stylised as jon-YAKITORY) is a Japanese Vocaloid producer, who has worked with several artists such as Ado, Shiyui, & Glim Spanky.

== Background ==
He made his start as a Vocaloid producer in 2013 via Nico Nico Douga under the name S@TORU but has been operating under jon-YAKITORY since 2017. Jon has stated his inspiration for being a Vocaloid producer was Jimmythumb P.

== Discography ==
=== Albums ===
Title	Release date	Label
"Y"	July 28, 2021	Napolitan jon
"INTO WONDERLAND"	October 31, 2025	Self-released

=== Extended plays ===
Title	Release date	Label
"TAP DANCER"	August 20, 2026	Self-released

=== Singles ===
Title	Release date	Label
"Arone"	March 2, 2020	Self-released
"Shikabanese" (feat. Ado)	March 29, 2020	Self-released
"Recommend!" (feat. Yua Furukawa)	June 7, 2020	Self-released
"Eat" (feat. Ado)	August 28, 2020	Self-released
"Faking of Comedy" (feat. Ado)	December 15, 2020	Self-released
"ONI" (Y mix)	June 25, 2021	Napolitan jon
"Antisystems" (feat. Ado)	July 16, 2021	Napolitan jon
"Koko de Ikiteru" (with Mary)	August 6, 2021	Simple Notes
"Noisy Sweet Home"	August 27, 2021	Napolitan jon
"Rasen" (feat. Ado)	September 17, 2021	Self-released
"It's show time!" f(eat. Sachiko Kobayashi & Christa All Stars) (Dogma Kazami / konoco / Kagura Nana / Goto Moesaki / YUC'e / Tsuruno Arisa ). / Hachioji P / jon-YAKITORY)	November 1, 2021	U&R records
"ONI" (feat. Shiyui)	December 1, 2021	Sony Music Labels
"Sanagara Mr."	July 8, 2022	Self-released
"Rebellion-kun" (feat. Yupman)	July 29, 2022	ene
"City"	August 12, 2022	Napolitan jon
"Want You Bad"	November 16, 2022	Self-released
"Freak" (feat. Yupman) / jon-YAKITORY & Hachioji P	January 1, 2023	Self-released
"Thunderbolt"	February 22, 2023	CFM
"Full of Secrets"	March 31, 2023	Self-released
"Konton Boogie"	August 30, 2023	Self-released
"Nonai" (feat. Ray Morris)	September 13, 2023	Sony Music Labels
"Arone" (feat. 9lana)	March 15, 2024	Self-released
"Yamada Perfect"	July 3, 2024	Self-released
"Reqiuem"	July 31, 2024	Self-released
"Bugswife" (feat. Hatsune Miku)	August 31, 2024	Self-released
"Izon"	September 27, 2024	Self-released
"Konton Boogie" (irucaice Remix)	March 5, 2025	Self-released
"Freak" (feat.Yupman / jon-YAKITORY, Hachioji P)	March 26, 2025	Self-released
"Super Millennium Virus"	April 26, 2025	Self-released
"USO" (feat. Kasane Teto)	May 31, 2025	Self-released
"Into Wonderland"	August 8, 2025	Self-released
"Kyominaiyo" (feat. KAFU)	August 27, 2025	Self-released
"Trend Angelina" (feat. Hatsune Miku)	November 16, 2025	Self-released
"Fighter" (feat. Hatsune Miku)	November 29, 2025	Self-released

=== Attributed works ===
Artist	Song	Release date
Mei Kamino	"Personality"	July 30, 2021
Ado	"Freedom"	January 26, 2022
R+...	"Finale"	September 14, 2022
Shiyui	"Re Re Replay"	January 25, 2023
Atarashii Gakko!	"It's Not"	March 22, 2023
Koyoiny	"Blue and Thorns"	April 26, 2023
Luca Mochizuki	"MONSTER" "Shikabanese"	April 26, 2023
Project Sekai	"city"	June 21, 2023
Vivid Bad Squad	"city"	June 21, 2023
Shiyui	"Happiness of the Dead"	August 9, 2023
Atarashii Gakko!	"Humanoids"	August 16, 2023
Taiyou to Odore Tsukiyo ni Utae	"Real Monster"	October 4, 2023
Glim Spanky	"Give Me Your Anger"(remix)	October 13, 2023
Nora	"Hideous Monster"	June 28, 2024
Ado	"Rockstar"	April 9, 2025
