= Odo (song) =

Single by Ado

from the album Kyōgen
- Language: Japanese
- Released: April 27, 2021
- Genre: J-pop; future house
- Length: 3:28
- Label: Virgin
- Composers: Giga; TeddyLoid
- Lyricist: Deco*27
- Producers: Giga; TeddyLoid

Ado singles chronology
| "Gira Gira" (2021) | "Odo" (2021) | "Yoru no Pierrot" (2021) |

Music video
- "Odo" on YouTube

"Odo" (Japanese: 踊; lit. "dance") is a song by Japanese singer Ado. It was released on April 27, 2021, by Virgin Music. The song has been used by NHK for a program about Vocaloid producers.

== Charts ==
Weekly chart performance for "Odo"
| Chart (2021) | Peak position |
|---|---|
| Global 200 (Billboard) | 122 |
| Japan (Japan Hot 100) | 4 |
| Japan Combined Singles (Oricon) | 6 |
