= New Genesis (song) =

Single by Ado

from the album Uta's Songs: One Piece Film Red
- Language: Japanese
- Released: June 8, 2022
- Genre: Synth-pop; electropop
- Length: 3:49
- Label: Virgin
- Songwriter: Yasutaka Nakata
- Producer: Nakata

Ado singles chronology
"Ashura-chan" (2021)	"New Genesis" (2022)	"I'm Invincible" (2022)

Music video
- "New Genesis" on YouTube

"New Genesis" (Japanese: 新時代, Hepburn: Shin Jidai; alternatively titled "New Genesis (Uta from One Piece Film Red)") is a song recorded by Japanese singer Ado, released on June 8, 2022, by Virgin Music. Written and produced by Yasutaka Nakata, the song served as the image song for the Japanese animated film, One Piece Film: Red. Upon its release, "New Genesis" peaked at number one on the Billboard Japan Hot 100 and Oricon Digital Singles Chart. The single also peaked at number 20 on the Billboard Global 200. It won Song of the Year at the 2022 MTV Video Music Awards Japan.

== Background ==
On June 8, the cast for the upcoming film, One Piece Film: Red was revealed. Amongst the cast, Ado was revealed as the singing voice actress for the character Uta while Kaori Nazuka reprised her role for Uta's non-singing parts. A single titled "New Genesis" was announced for release later that month, with lyrics and production by Yasutaka Nakata.

From August 7 to August 28, 2022, "New Genesis" also served as the opening theme for the animated television series, One Piece.

== Composition and lyrics ==
A synth-pop and electropop song, "New Genesis" features heavy usage of synthesizers. Nakata was asked by Eiichiro Oda, the creator of One Piece, to create a "powerful song that symbolizes the birth of a new diva," as well as a song that matches the world of One Piece.

The song's title, "New Genesis", represents the ideal utopian world Uta, the female lead of the film, wanted to create.

== Commercial performance ==
"New Genesis" debuted at number nine on the Billboard Japan Hot 100 for the week of June 15, 2022. On the Oricon Digital Singles Chart, the song debuted at number one. Following the release of the film and its accompanying soundtrack, "New Genesis" peaked at number one on the Japan Hot 100. The song held its number one position on the Japan Hot 100 for six weeks. On August 31, streaming numbers for "New Genesis" exceeded 100 million, marking Ado's fifth song to have over 100 million streams.

Globally, "New Genesis" peaked at number 20 on the Billboard Global 200. On Apple Music, "New Genesis" topped the Global 100 playlist, the first for a Japanese song. Following this, the weekly views of the J-pop genre on Apple Music reached a new record.

== Music video ==
An animated music video was released to YouTube on June 15, 2022. The music video was animated by Hmng, with choreography by Mikiko.

== Personnel ==
Credits adapted from Tidal.

- Ado – vocals
- Yasutaka Nakata – production, songwriting, recording arrangement

== Charts ==
=== Weekly charts ===
Weekly chart performance for "New Genesis"
Chart (2022)	Peak position
Global 200 (Billboard)	20
Japan (Japan Hot 100)	1
Japan Hot Animation (Billboard Japan)	1
Japan Combined Singles (Oricon)	1
US World Digital Song Sales (Billboard)	9

=== Year-end charts ===
2022 year-end chart performance for "New Genesis"
Chart (2022)	Position
Global Excl. US (Billboard)	120
Japan (Japan Hot 100)	7
Japan Hot Animation (Billboard Japan)	3
Japan Combined Singles (Oricon)	10

2023 year-end chart performance for "New Genesis"
Chart (2023)	Position
Japan (Japan Hot 100)	6
Japan Hot Animation (Billboard Japan)	4

2024 year-end chart performance for "New Genesis"
Chart (2024)	Position
Japan (Japan Hot 100)	67

== Certifications ==
Certifications and sales for "New Genesis"
Region	Certification	Certified units/sales
Japan (RIAJ) Single track	Platinum	250,000^{*}
Japan (RIAJ) Streaming	Diamond	500,000,000^{†}
^{*} Sales figures based on certification alone.^{†} Streaming-only figures based on certification alone.

== Accolades ==
Awards and nominations for "New Genesis"
Ceremony	Year	Award	Result	Ref.
MTV Video Music Awards Japan	2022	Song of the Year	Won	
Crunchyroll Anime Awards	2023	Best Anime Song	Nominated	

== Release history ==
Release history and formats for "New Genesis"
Region	Date	Format	Label	Ref.
Various	June 8, 2022	Digital download; streaming	Virgin; Universal	
