= Tsumiki =

Japanese producer

Tsumiki (ツミキ)
- Born: August 11, 1997 (age 29); Osaka
- Origin: Japan
- Genres: Vocaloid; Utaite
- Occupation: Singer · songwriter · producer
- Instruments: Vocaloid; Drums
- Years active: 2017-present
- Label: SMEJ
- Member of: Aooo; Dreamers; Nomelon Nolemon

YouTube information
- Channel: ツミキ / NOMELON NOLEMON
- Years active: 2021–present
- Subscribers: 333 thousand
- Views: 180 million
- Last updated: November 3, 2026

Tsumiki (ツミキ; born 11 August 1997) is a Japanese Vocaloid producer, and singer-songwriter, best known for his song "Phony".

In addition, he produced the song "Bibbidiba" by Hoshimachi Suisei, and has made remixes for artists such as Airi Suzuki and Kairiki Bear. He is also the drummer for J-rock band Aooo with Surii/Threee, Riko Ishino, and Hikaru Yamamoto, and a part of duo Nomelon Nolemon with Miki Maria.

== Background ==
Tsumiki was born in Osaka Prefecture, Japan on 11 August 1997. He was invested in music from age 12, having listened to Ryo and Hachi. He was part of a track and field team, and was a part of a band in his high school years before he dropped out at 17. He has stated he got his stage name from Sheena Ringo's song "Asobi Tsumiki".

== Career ==
In 2017, Tsumiki debuted on NicoNico with the song "Tokyo Diver Fake Show".

In 2021, he released his debut album Sakkac Craft, formed the duo Nomelon Nolemon with Miki Maria, and also composed The Caligula Effect 2's soundtrack.

== Selected discography ==
Albums
Title	Release date	Label
Sakkac Craft	February 3, 2021	SMEJ

Collaborations
Title	Collaborated artist	Release date	Album	Label
"Disappearance Addiction" (イナイイナイ依存症)	Kairiki Bear	15 January 2020	Venom (ベノマ)	Subcul-rise Record
"Phony" (フォニイ)	KAFU	18 December 2021	Symmetry	Kamitsubaki Studio
Culture (カルチャ)	Hatsune Miku	16 October 2021	Non-album single	Crypton Future Media
"Naked" (赤裸裸)	Reol	May 18, 2022	Non-album single	Sony Music Labels
"Shampoo"	Airi Suzuki	20 March 2024	28/29	Sony Music Labels
"Ivy" (アイヴイ)	Temari Tsukimura (voiced by Nao Ojika) of Gakuen Idolmaster	23 May 2024	Non-album single	Asobinotes
"Chewing Disco" (チューイン・ディスコ)	KAF	24 August 2024	Non-album single	Phenomenon (Kamitsubaki)
"Tokyo Shandy Rendez-vous" (トウキョウ・シャンディ・ランデヴ)	Maisondes KAF	20 October 2024	Noisy Love Songs	Sony Music Labels

Other credits
Title	Artist	Release date	Album	Label
"Eat The Past" (過去を喰らう)	KAF	12 August 2020	Kansoku (観測)	Kamitsubaki Studio
"Burnable"	Soraru	29 September 2021	Yume Wo Kikasete (ゆめをきかせて)	Virgin
"Bibbidiba" (ビビデバ)	Hoshimachi Suisei	23 March 2024	Shinsei Mokuroku (新星目録)	Cover Corp
"Glow"	Shiyui	22 May 2024	be noble	Sony Music Labels
"Magic"	Ado	26 September 2025	Non-album single	Universal Music Japan
"Serenade"	natori	4 February 2026	The Abyss	Sony Music Labels
"Shadow" (シャドウ)	LiSA	15 April 2026	Lace Up	Sacra Music
