= Overdose (disambiguation) =

Drug overdose is the ingestion or application of a medication or other substance in a quantity greater than that recommended.

Overdose may also refer to:

== Music ==
- Overdose (album), by Pizzicato Five, 1994
- The Overdose, an album by 11/5, 1999
- Overdose (EP), by Exo-K and Exo-M (which was the two subunits of Exo), 2014
  - "Overdose" (Exo song), the title song
- "Overdose" (Ciara song), 2013
- "Overdose," a song by AC/DC from Let There Be Rock, 1977
- "Overdose", a song by Agnez Mo, 2018
- "Overdose", a song by Alessia Cara from Know-It-All (album), 2015
- "Overdose", a song by Future from The Wizrd, 2019
- "Overdose," a song by Hiroomi Tosaka, 2019
- "Overdose", a song by Jason Derulo from Future History, 2011
- "Overdose," a song by Little Daylight, 2013
- "Overdose", a song by なとり / natori, 2022
- "Overdose", a song by Nav from Good Intentions, 2020
- "Overdose", a song by Status Quo from In the Army Now, 1986
- "Overdose", a song by Tomcraft, 2001
- "Overdose" (YoungBoy Never Broke Again song), 2018
- "OverdoZZe", a song by ZZ Ward from Dirty Shine, 2023

== Other uses ==
- Overdose (horse) (2005–2015), a Hungarian Thoroughbred racehorse
- Gungrave: Overdose, a 2004 video game

== See also ==
- Dose (disambiguation)
