= List of Minahamu exhibitions =

Wikimedia list article

The following list is an exhibition list of Minahamu, who is a Japanese illustrator from Tokyo, Japan.

== Solo exhibitions ==
Title	Date(s)	Venue	Ref
"Also, Cute" (それと、かわいい)	September 19–September 23, 2015	Shiori-bi (3rd floor)	
"Southern Island"	July 2017	meee	
"Musashino Art University Graduation Exhibition"	January 18–21, 2018	Musashino Art University	
"41st Tokyo Five Art Universities Joint Graduation and Completion Works Exhibition"	February 22–March 4, 2018	The National Art Center, Tokyo (New Art Museum)	
"Minahamu"	August 31–September 9, 2018	Genron Chaos*Lounge Gotanda Atelier	
"Michikusa"	October 2019	Taco Che	
"Wind and Destination"	May 1–June 1, 2020	Mangasick	
"Promise" (約束)	October 1–October 14, 2021	colifer102	
"Spring Stars" (春の星)	March 2022	ACG_Labo	
"Scattered Crayfish" (ザリガニ散る)	May 20–June 2, 2022	Kusamura BOOKS Shin-Moriyama	
"Summer's Exit"	October 1–October 14, 2022	Ginza Tsutaya Bookstore	
"Winter's Entrance"	October 15–October 31, 2022	Ginza Tsutaya Bookstore	
"Vues en mémoire" (Scenes in Memories)	January 25–January 29	Gallery Jo Yana	
"Sea of the Heart" (心海)	June 2–June 3, 2023	Mangasick	
"Minaham Art Book Release Commemorative Exhibition 'In the Wind'" (みなはむ画集発売記念展『風の中)	September 2–24, 2023	space caiman	
"Shuttle" (シャトル)	March 16–March 31, 2024	FOLK old book store	
"Life in a Botanical Garden" (植物館のある生活)	June 17–July 6, 2025	Yumenoshima Tropical Botanical Garden (Yumenetsu)	
"Grass Entangled Wheels" (草のからまった車輪)	August 8–September 1, 2025	Mangasick	

== Collaborative exhibitions ==
Title	Collaborator(s)	Date(s)	Venue	Ref
"Running Lines, Flourishing Colors" (駆ける線、繁茂する色)	Sayaka Ishiyama / gallery TOWED	July 24, 2021	gallery TOWED	
"Yume Ichimura + Minahamu + Hinata Mori 3-person exhibition" (市村柚芽＋みなはむ＋森ひなた 3人展)	Yume Ichimura / Hinata Mori / iTohen	March 12–March 24, 2022	iTohen	
"Reading Three Stars" (みつ星を読む)	Sayo Itami / Hiromi Itami	June 18–July 2, 20	Art Gallery SHIROKANE 6C	
"Speaking to the Sky" (そらにはなす)	Sayo Itami / Hiromi Itami	September 22–October 6, 2024	Art Gallery SHIROKANE 6C	
"Yumenetsu x Minaham Pop-up Exhibition"	Yumenoshima Tropical Botanical Garden (Yumenetsu)	March 8–April 7, 2024	Yumenoshima Tropical Botanical Garden (Yumenetsu)	
"Where the Maids Are"	Books and Maid Shop Kizetsu	October 25–November 4, 2024	Books and Maid Shop Kizetsu	
"Petit Genre"	Izumi Abe / Aoi Tokunaga	January 11–January 26, 2025	myheirloom	

== Participated exhibitions ==
Title	Date(s)	Venue	Ref
"082-083"	February 28–March 14, 2015	Fukagawa Bansho Gallery	
"Chaos Lounge 9 'Vapor Hell'"	September 9–September 24, 2017	Billiken Gallery	
"Kurikuri Cafe"	December 23, 2018	Kurikuri Cafe	
"Daily Bubbles"	March 2019	pocke	
"Kohonya Selection Vol.01"	November 3–December 22, 2019	Kohonya	
"Drawing Exhibition" (7th Anniversary)	"Early Period" (July 23–July 29, 2021)	Marienkafer Gallery	
"Drawing Exhibition" (8th Anniversary)	"Mid-Term Period" (July 30–August 5, 2022)	Marienkafer Gallery	
"Yudachi"	June 3–June 15, 2022	Shinjuku Ganka Art Gallery (Space M)	
"Hatsuharu"	January 13–January 25, 2023	Shinjuku Ganka Art Gallery (Space M/S/E)	
"GINZA ILLUST ZINE STREET Vol.0"	January 26–February 15, 2023	Ginza Tsutaya Bookstore	
"Seimei"	March 30–April 14, 2024	JITSUZAISEI	
"Nkiyahhi Ten" (ンキッャヒ展)	September 14–September 24, 2024	Marienkafer Gallery	
"FOLK old book store 14th Anniversary Exhibition: 'Books and Music'"	September 21–October 6, 2024	FOLK old book store	
"Shirokane Christmas"	December 21–28, 2024	Art Gallery SHIROKANE 6C	
"The 6th Geijutsu Hakase wa Mita: Sayo Itami 'My Friend'" (第6回芸術ハカセは見た「伊丹小夜ぼくのともだち」)	January 21–February 2, 2025	Tokushima Castle Museum	
"Everyone Loves Books"	July 5–July 19, 2025	Art Gallery SHIROKANE 6C / Taco Che	
