= Gakuen Idolmaster =

2024 video game

- Developer: QualiArts
- Publisher: Bandai Namco Entertainment
- Producer: Hidefumi Komino
- Artists: Aki Minamino; Hechima
- Writers: Tsukasa Fushimi; Yū Shimizu; Kazuki Amamiya
- Composer: Takafumi Satō
- Series: The Idolmaster
- Engine: Unity
- Platforms: iOS; Android; Windows
- Release: iOS, Android: JP: May 16, 2024; Windows: JP: March 18, 2025; (DMM Games)
- Genres: Raising simulation, roguelike deck-building
- Mode: Single-player

Gakuen Idolmaster (学園アイドルマスター, Gakuen Aidorumasutā; lit. 'Academy Idolmaster'), also referred to as The Idolmaster Gakuen in English, is a free-to-play roguelike deck-building game developed by QualiArts and published by Bandai Namco Entertainment as a spin-off of The Idolmaster franchise. It was released in Japan on May 16, 2024, for both iOS and Android. A version for Windows was released on March 18, 2025, and is available at DMM Games.

== Gameplay ==
Gakuen Idolmaster is a roguelike deck-building game. In a round of the raising simulation, the player raises the idol's stats through lessons with a deck of skill cards, such that she can pass the mid-term and final exams, and perform in a live concert at the end of production. Each skill card in the deck has a different effect including increasing status or energy, and costs stamina when the player uses it. The player can also improve the deck, and acquire P-items and drinks through consultation with the teachers, etc.

The game requires the player to repeat the simulation. In the process, the player can raise their affection level with the idols and their account level. They can also obtain new support and skill cards, and strengthen their existing ones.

== Story ==
=== Setting and characters ===
The game takes place at the Hatsuboshi Gakuen (初星学園), an idol training school. The player acts as a student in the Producer Department of the school, serving as the producer of individual idol units in the main story, or can choose to produce an individual idol studying in the Idol Department.

The audition for the cast of the idols was held in 2021. On March 5, 2024, three of the initial nine idols and their voice actresses were revealed.

=== Characters ===
The game initially was released with ten idols, until the release of rival characters later in the game's service.

- Saki Hanami (花海咲季) voiced by Aoi Nagatsuki
  A rambunctious, athletic and hyper-competitive first-year with an aloof side. Being the highest scorer in the Hatsuboshi entrance exam, she is a child prodigy who excels at everything. However, her abilities eventually stagnated after a long time at her peak.
- Temari Tsukimura (月村手毬) voiced by Nao Ojika
  A first-year who was the big-eating former number one idol of her middle school. She was once part of SyngUp! alongside Misuzu Hataya and Rinha Kaya before disbanding. While appearing to be a stoic and sarcastic person, she has a lazy, childish streak. Game director Daichi Sato describes her as a person who "behaves like a wolf but is a Chihuahua inside".
- Kotone Fujita (藤田ことね) voiced by Hikaru Iida
  A neurotic, money-obsessed first-year who aims to be an idol for a living. Due to her underprivileged background, she tried supporting her family working on numerous part-time jobs, forcing her to tank her grades.
- Rinami Himesaki (姫崎莉波) voiced by Yuri Usui
  The sisterly secretary of Hatsuboshi Gakuen's student council, who was the former member of an idol unit where she unsuccessfully marketed herself as a younger sister. She is also revealed to be the producer's childhood friend.
- Sumika Shiun (紫雲清夏) voiced by Miya Minato
  A laid-back and carefree gyaru and former ballerina who is classmates with Saki, Kotone and Temari and is best friends with Lilja. Underneath her lively and cheerful attitude, she struggles with trauma from injuring her right knee which led her to skip dance lessons.
- Hiro Shinosawa (篠澤広) voiced by Reina Kawamura
  A mysteriously eccentric, yet physically frail first-year. She has slightly masochistic tendencies due to finding pleasure in hardships, but is extremely smart for her age, having graduated from a foreign university at 14 years old, despite receiving zero marks in practical examinations. She often exclaims "Kyu!" upon collapsing from exhaustion.
- Lilja Katsuragi (葛城リーリヤ) voiced by Kana Hanaiwa
  A hardworking Swedish exchange student who is best friends with Sumika, having met her during her trip to Sweden, and is also classmates with Saki, Kotone and Temari. She is half-Swedish and half-Japanese and initially possesses a timid and unconfident personality.
- China Kuramoto (倉本千奈) voiced by Mao Itō
  A spoiled but well-natured scion of the Kuramoto family, who are the wealthy founders of a zaibatsu known as the Kuramoto Group, of which one of its members is a benefactor of Hatsuboshi's headmaster Kunio Jūō. She starts off untalented, having only been roped into Hatsuboshi Gakuen out of cronyism with Kunio sensing her "hidden potential", but wishes to be a great idol.
- Mao Arimura (有村麻央) voiced by Tsumugi Nanase
  A tomboyish third-year who is the leader of Hatsuboshi Gakuen's idol department dormitory. Commonly referred to as the "Little Prince" by the juniors, she dreams of being an opera star, having served as a child actor while younger.
- Ume Hanami (花海佑芽) voiced by Ayane Matsuda
  Saki Hanami's late-blooming younger sister with an energetic disposition. At the beginning of the game, she first arrives late after Hatsuboshi's entrance ceremony, and is the first idol to initially meet the producer, sharing the same school year as Saki due to her birth date overlapping with the minimum intake birthdate. Despite her apparent lack of experience about being an idol as a reserve intake, Ume wishes to surpass her sister, seeing her as her biggest role model.
- Misuzu Hataya (秦谷美鈴) voiced by Non Harusaki
  Misuzu is a laid-back and gentle girl who does everything at her own pace. She's polite and soft-spoken, with a calm presence that often makes others feel at ease. She tends to her classmates and guides them around like a mother would, and she's very caring and loving. She's especially affectionate toward her best friend Temari, treating her like a little sister, though Temari's tendency to overwork herself often worries her.
- Sena Juō (十王星南) voiced by Mashiro Hitaka
  The principal's granddaughter and the current student council president of Hatsuboshi Academy, Sena is extremely popular with fellow students. Having been raised to become an elite idol from a young age, she is considered the "Academy's Top Idol" and is also the "Prima Stella". For some reason, Sena seems to have developed a taste for idol talents, as seen when she first met Kotone Fujita, whose talents managed to capture her interest.
- Tsubame Amaya (雨夜 燕) voiced by Yukari Amane
  Student council vice president of Hatsuboshi Academy, Tsubame is a childhood friend of Sena, with whom she has a friendly rivalry. She seems to be very confident in her abilities and is also very strict with herself and fellow students. Tired of being the long-time Number 2 Idol at Hatsuboshi Academy, Tsubame aspires to one day become the new "Prima Stella".
- Kanae Hiwatari (氷渡香名江) voiced by Sayaka Abe
  China's serious and hardworking housemaid. Putting China at top of her priority, she is otherwise very oblivious to her own feelings. She believes she simply wants to support China's journey as an idol, despite having an innate talent to become one.

Besides the idols, other cast members include Akio Ōtsuka as Kunio Jūō, the school headmaster, Aoi Koga as Asari Neo, a teacher from the Producer Department, and Minami Tanaka, Yuki Wakai and Yu Serizawa as trainers.

== Plot ==
The plot focuses on a student from the Producer Department in Hatsuboshi Gakuen, who would either choose to produce an individual idol in the game, where he would be assigned to manage a single idol and help them move throughout the New Idol Awards (N.I.A.) and Hatsuboshi Idol Festival (H.I.F.), on their journey to become the Prima Stella, Hatsuboshi's topmost idol, whilst helping them overcome their own problems and reveal their true potential, or in the main storylines, choose to produce idols as group units and move them towards the H.I.F., as mentioned in the routes below.

=== Hatsuboshi Komyu (初星コミュ) ===
In this route, the producer is assigned to the main three idols Saki Hanami, Kotone Fujita and Temari Tsukimura. Aspiring idol Ume Hanami arrives late after her sister Saki's entrance ceremony at the Hatsuboshi Gakuen idol academy. Encountering the producer, she introduces them to Saki. Saki agrees to have the student serve as her producer, and he brings Saki to meet Kotone and Temari. The producer and Saki brief them about the HIF, a competition to determine the next Prima Stella.

As the producer encounters other idols, they meet incumbent Prima Stella and student council president Sena Jūō. Overhearing Ume's request to join Sena's idol unit, the producer sets her up as a rival against Saki, Kotone and Temari during the H.I.F. selections, debuting as Re;Iris. Sena pairs Ume with Temari's former unit member Misuzu Hataya, forming Begrazia while also performing as their producer. Although Begrazia defeat Re;Iris in the selections, temporarily upsetting Saki, both groups were tied in the finals. Re;Iris were ultimately declared the champions, and Saki is named the new Prima Stella as the H.I.F. concludes.

== Development ==
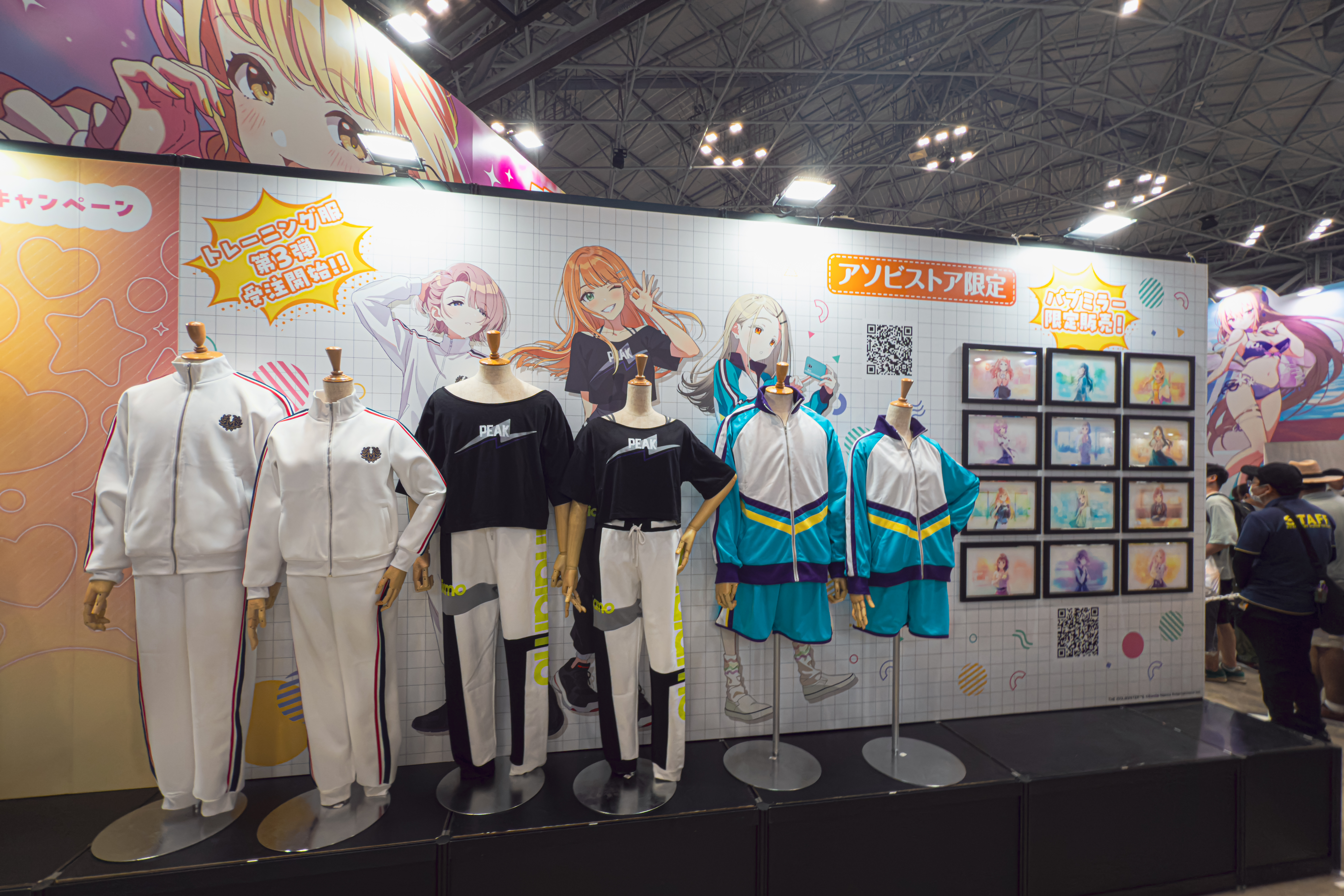
Costumes worn by Mao Arimura, Sumika Shiun, and Hiro Shinosawa, displayed at Comiket 106

On July 25, 2023, during the franchise's 18th anniversary live stream, it was announced The Idolmaster franchise would release a new brand, starting with a mobile game. It was also revealed that Hidefumi Komino was the producer of the new brand, and the project had been started almost five years ago. The then-untitled brand would be the sixth brand of the franchise, following the original brand, Cinderella Girls, Million Live!, SideM and Shiny Colors.

The title of the game, Gakuen Idolmaster, as well as the first promotional video, were revealed in a live stream on March 5, 2024. In the live stream, the staff and cast were revealed as well. The scenario is written by light novel writers Tsukasa Fushimi, Yū Shimizu and Kazuki Amamiya. The character drafts were created by Aki Minamino and Hechima. The game was set to be released in Q2 of the same year.

=== Music ===
The music works are released under Asobinotes, a record label owned by Bandai Namco Entertainment. The soundtracks in the singles released are different from those used in the live concert scenes in the game, which was the idea from QualiArts.

"Campus mode!!" is the ending theme song of the game, (Note: Information is taken from the ending credits of each idol.) and the player can first listen to it when the affection level reaches ten for any idol. When the game was launched, it was difficult to raise the affection level to ten, so within the fanbase mentioning the song itself is considered as a spoiler of the story plot.

=== Graphics ===
According to Hidefumi Komino, the 3D model of a character consists of 60,000 polygons.

=== Story ===
It was the first time The Idolmaster franchise had notable light novel writers joining the production from the beginning of a project. Tsukasa Fushimi, the author of Oreimo and Eromanga Sensei, not only wrote the story but also was involved in the character design. The stories of Saki, Temari, Kotone, China and Hiro are written by Fushimi, while those of the other characters are written by Yū Shimizu and Kazuki Amamiya.

== Release ==
Gakuen Idolmaster was released on May 16, 2024, for iOS and Android devices. In December 2024, Bandai Namco announced an official Windows port of Gakuen Idolmaster which was released on March 18, 2025.

== Music ==
=== Discography ===
==== Digital singles ====
Title	Release date	Singer(s)	Lyricist(s)	Composer(s)	Arranger(s)	Peak chart positions		Ref
Title	Release date	Singer(s)	Lyricist(s)	Composer(s)	Arranger(s)	JPN Dig.	JPN DL	Ref
"Fighting My Way"	May 16, 2024	Saki Hanami	Hiromi	Giga		15	20	
"Luna say maybe"	May 16, 2024	Temari Tsukimura	Minami		Minami, Katsuhiro Mafune (Note: Mafune is the bassist of the band Flower Flower.)	22	27	
"Sekaiichi Kawaii Watashi" (世界一可愛い私)	May 16, 2024	Kotone Fujita	HoneyWorks			31	37	
"clumsy trick"	May 16, 2024	Rinami Himesaki	Shō Watanabe (Note: Watanabe is the creator of the songs "Connect", "Colorful" and "Luminous".)		Shinpei Nasuno	29	36	
"Tame-Lie-One-Step"	May 16, 2024	Sumika Shiun	Yūta Azuma			32	38	
"Kōkei" (光景)	May 16, 2024	Hiro Shinosawa	Hakushi Hasegawa		Hakushi Hasegawa, Arthur Verocai	42	52	
"Hakusen" (白線)	May 16, 2024	Lilja Katsuragi	NayutalieN			39	49	
"Wonder Scale"	May 16, 2024	China Kuramoto	Shōko Ōhmori	Shu Kanematsu (Note: Kanematsu is one of composers of various drama television series, and also anime series including Castle Town Dandelion, Clockwork Planet, My Next Life as a Villainess: All Routes Lead to Doom!, The Café Terrace and Its Goddesses and The Kingdoms of Ruin.)		—	74	
"Fluorite"	May 16, 2024	Mao Arimura	Kana Yaginuma	Moe Shop		38	46	
"Hajime" (初)	May 16, 2024	All nine idols (Note: Ume Hanami is not included.)	Sasuke Haraguchi		Dan Miyakawa	37	45	
"Ivy" (アイヴイ)	May 23, 2024	Temari Tsukimura	Tsumiki (Note: Tsumiki is the creator of the songs "Phony" and "Bibbidiba".)			25	26	
"The Rolling Riceball"	June 1, 2024	Ume Hanami	Takafumi Satō		Akinori Handa	48	56	
"Kanaetai, Kotabakari" (叶えたい、ことばかり)	June 3, 2024	Temari Tsukimura	Tōma Tanaka			18	23	
"Campus mode!!"	June 10, 2024	All nine idols	Tomoya Tabuchi (Note: Tabuchi is the bassist of the band Unison Square Garden, and created songs for various singers including Dialogue+.)		Shunsuke Takizawa	13	15	
"Yellow Big Bang!"	June 11, 2024	Kotone Fujita	Kana Yaginuma	Shōtaro Seo		21	21	
"Boom Boom Pow"	June 20, 2024	Saki Hanami	Kentz (Note: Kentz is known for creating songs for various idol groups including NiziU, JO1, Snow Man and Number_i.)		Kentz, Ereca	23	24	
"Kimi to Semi Blue" (キミとセミブルー)	July 2, 2024	Rinami Himesaki, Mao Arimura, Sumika Shiun	Itsukioto	Hajime Mitsumasu				

==== CD singles ====
Title	Release date	Singer(s)	Ref
"Fighting My Way"	August 7, 2024	Saki Hanami	
"Luna say maybe"	August 7, 2024	Temari Tsukimura	
"Sekaiichi Kawaii Watashi"	August 7, 2024	Kotone Fujita	
"Hakusen"	August 28, 2024	Lilja Katsuragi	
"Wonder Scale"	August 28, 2024	China Kuramoto	
"clumsy trick"	August 28, 2024	Rinami Himesaki	
"Fluorite"	September 25, 2024	Mao Arimura	
"Tame-Lie-One-Step"	September 25, 2024	Sumika Shiun	
"Kōkei"	September 25, 2024	Hiro Shinosawa	

=== Albums ===
Title	Release date	Ref
Season Solo Collection Vol.1: Kimi to Semi Blue (Season Solo Collection Vol.1 「キミとセミブルー」)	August 14, 2024	

=== Live event ===
The first live concert tour "Gakuen Idolmaster: Debut Live Hajime Tour" began in August 2024, and will conclude in February 2025.

== Other media ==
A manga adaptation written by Smile Down the Runway's author Kotoba Inoya and illustrated by Yuu Okino was announced on May 8, 2024. The manga series began its serialization in Weekly Shōnen Champion in the same year. The protagonist is Kotone Fujita.

A radio show titled Hatsuboshi Gakuen Ongaku-bu (初星学園音楽部; lit. 'Hatsuboshi Gakuen Music Club') premiered on Apple Music on May 18, 2024. The host is Akihiro Tomita.

=== Gakuen Idolmaster: Story of Re;Iris ===
On January 1, 2026, an 11-episode CGI anime compilation of the game's Hatsuboshi Komyu main story chapter cutscenes aired on Tokyo MX1 as Gakuen Idolmaster: Story of Re;Iris (学園アイドルマスター Story of Re;IRIS, Gakuen Aidorumasutā Story of Re;IRIS) as a New Year's Day special, accompanied by a one-hour special with the cast members for the in-game Re;Iris unit.

==== Episodes ====
No.	Title	Original release date
1	"Episode 1"	January 1, 2026
A male student in Hatsuboshi Gakuen, the biggest idol training school in Japan, begins his career as an idol producer, meeting an idol student named Ume Hanaumi who arrives late to Hatsuboshi's entrance ceremony. The producer is then revealed to be assigned to Ume's hyper-competitive older sister Saki, whom she wishes to surpass. He brings Saki to meet fellow assigned idols Kotone Fujita and Temari Tsukimura, introducing them to the Hatsuboshi Idol Festival, a competition determining the next Prima Stella. Though Saki and Temari were reluctant initially, Kotone agrees to attempt to convince them with the producer. The producer brings Kotone and Saki to a dance-off, knowing their significant talents for dancing. As they prepare, the producer has Kotone rest for the day, and agrees to help Kotone secure a scholarship for her troubled financial background. The next day, Kotone and Saki begin their dance-off in the training room.
2	"Episode 2"	January 1, 2026
After Kotone wins the dance-off against Saki, humbling and convincing her to join the producer and Kotone's side, extracurricular activities begin at Hatsuboshi with the trio taking dance lessons together. The producer reveals that Temari was the excellent former singer of an idol trio unit during middle school, before disbanding; Saki and Kotone have her privately confess that she selfishly disbanded her former unit, deeming that the other two were "useless", which fueled her prideful determination to stand out by herself. Kotone successfully convinces Temari to join her and Saki despite their initial reservations and bickering between the three.
3	"Episode 3"	January 1, 2026
4	"Episode 4"	January 1, 2026
5	"Episode 5"	January 1, 2026
6	"Episode 6"	January 1, 2026
7	"Episode 7"	January 1, 2026
8	"Episode 8"	January 1, 2026
9	"Episode 9"	January 1, 2026
10	"Episode 10"	January 1, 2026
11	"Episode 11"	January 1, 2026

== Reception ==
According to Oricon, Gakuen Idolmaster ranked first in the weekly ranking of the number of downloads among free-to-play games on the App Store platform in its first week of release.

== See also ==
- Bladedance of Elementalers and The Demon Sword Master of Excalibur Academy, light novel series written by Yū Shimizu
- Haibara's Teenage New Game+, light novel series written by Kazuki Amamiya
- Idoly Pride, another mobile game developed by QualiArts
