= List of Kimi ni Todoke episodes =

The cover of the first DVD compilation released by VAP.

This is a list of the episodes of the shōjo anime series Kimi ni Todoke, directed by Hiro Kaburagi (later by Kenichi Matsuzawa) and produced by Production I.G. The anime is based on the manga series of the same name by Karuho Shiina. Series composition is led by Tomoko Konparu, with character designs being provided by Yuka Shibata.

The first season aired from October 6, 2009, to March 30, 2010. It was released on Region 2 DVD in Japan from December 23, 2009, to July 23, 2010.

A second season was announced in the November 2010 issue of Betsuma magazine and aired on NTV from January 4 to March 30, 2011.

A third season began streaming worldwide on Netflix on August 1, 2024. Season 3 adapts the manga up until chapter 75.

For season 1, the opening theme music, "Kimi ni Todoke" (きみにとどけ) is by Tomofumi Tanizawa, and the ending, "Kataomoi" (片思い) is by Chara. For season 2, the opening, "Soufuu", a.k.a. "Sawakaze" (爽風) is also by Tomofumi Tanizawa. The ending theme, "Kimi ni Todoke..." (君に届け...) is by May's. For season 3, the opening is "et cetera" performed by imase.

NIS America released the first two subtitled seasons in three volumes from January 10 to July 3, 2012. NIS America later re-released the series on February 4, 2014. The North American license was passed to Funimation on April 15, 2021, and subsequently to Netflix on January 1, 2023, which began streaming the first two seasons with an English dub on February 1, 2024.

== Episode list ==
=== Season 1 (2009-2010) ===
| No. | Title | Original release date |
|---|---|---|
| 1 | "Prologue"; Transliteration: "Purorōgu" (Japanese: プロローグ) | October 6, 2009 |
Kuronuma Sawako is considered cursed by her classmates due to her appearance and shy personality. She is nicknamed "Sadako" after the famous ghost from The Ring. Sawako however encounters the popular Kazehaya Shouta, who talks to her normally and encourages her to try open up and make new friends. Sawako then volunteers to play as the ghost during a class event, the test of courage. During the test, Kazehaya comes to keep her company. Through this, Sawako is also able to become a little closer to two classmates, Yoshida Chizuru and Yano Ayane.
| 2 | "Seating Change"; Transliteration: "Sekigae" (Japanese: 席替え) | October 13, 2009 |
When Sawako gives up her umbrella to cover a box with a puppy in it during a rainstorm, she shows up to school drenched. Yoshida and Yano give her a change of clothes. Kazehaya gives his towel to her. On the way home Kazehaya reveals that he was playing with the same puppy earlier, explaining why he came to school drenched as well. Afterwards he decides to adopt the puppy, promising Sawako that she can see it again at a later date. The next day, Sawako's class has a seat change day. Unfortunately for Sawako, no one wants to sit by her. Anxiously trying to avoid Sawako, they settle on drawing numbers to determine seating. After hearing enough of it, Kazehaya moves his table and seat next to Sawako's, and asks to switch with whoever had that number assigned. Seeing this, Yano and Yoshida do the same. Sawako also gets to meet Sanada Ryuu, a friend of Kazehaya and Yoshida, who sits behind her. Wanting to show her appreciation for the events of the previous day, Sawako gives them some home made cookies as a thanks for being so nice to her. A character that appears later on, Kurumizawa Ume, first appears in this episode for a brief moment.
| 3 | "After School"; Transliteration: "Hōkago" (Japanese: 放課後) | October 20, 2009 |
Sawako offers to help with after-class teacher activities. Endo and Hirano see Sawako after school and ask to help her. The next day, Kazehaya gives Sawako a note during class wanting to know if she will meet him after school. Sawako says yes, and they meet after school with Maru-chan, the puppy Kazehaya took home in the previous episode. Sawako tells Kazehaya about how she studies by imagining that she is teaching the material to a person who doesn't understand. The next day at school, Kazehaya asks for her help, prompting the rest of the class to come over. They are treated with a rare smile from Sawako. After school that day, Yano and Yoshida overhear some girls talking about them and when they confront the girls, they are told that Sawako started the rumors. A new character, Kurumizawa Ume, appears in this episode.
| 4 | "Rumors"; Transliteration: "Uwasa" (Japanese: 噂) | October 27, 2009 |
Yano and Yoshida become the talk of the school as everyone starts spreading rumors about them. When they ask who were spreading the rumors, they were surprised to hear that Sawako was behind them. A classmate, Shino, approaches Sawako to ask her about these rumors, although Sawako misunderstands and thinks she is talking about the ghost rumors, so she interrupts her, calling it a simple misunderstanding. Shino tells Sawako she was able to make friends. At this moment Yano and Yoshida walk up the stairway and overhear the conversation. Shino brings up their names and Sawako quickly interrupts and says "they're not my friends." Before they can hear the rest, the teacher, Pin, drags them off. Sawako continues to explain that she isn't on the same level of friendship that is shared between Yano and Yoshida. Later, Sawako overhears some girls talking in the toilets and interprets it as if she's making Yano and Yoshida sad and is ruining Kazehaya's reputation. Later on, Kazehaya tries to talk to Sawako and asks her if he's done something to upset her. She explains that nothing could make her want to stay away from him, but runs away after seeing a group of people walking their way in order to keep Kazehaya's reputation intact.
| 5 | "Determination"; Transliteration: "Ketsui" (Japanese: 決意) | November 3, 2009 |
After Sawako hears the rumors she avoids Kazehaya, Yano and Yoshida. Sawako thinks that she should go back to the time when she hadn't become friendly with Kazehaya, but she feels that this would be very lonely. Kazehaya gets angry and confronts Sawako, who tells him why she was avoiding him. Kazehaya tells her that it is their choice to be with her and asks her to tell Yano and Yoshida about her feelings. In the meantime, Yano and Yoshida have been wondering if the rumors were really spread by Sawako. They both feel bad for doubting her, but realize that they are so worried about her means that they really were already friends. The next day Sawako is in the bathroom, wondering how she should start a talk with Yano and Yoshida, when she hears about people talking about the rumors. She comes out to confront them and tell them it's a misunderstanding. They corner her against the wall and call Yoshida and Yano a "delinquent" and a "slut".
| 6 | "Friends"; Transliteration: "Tomodachi" (Japanese: 友達) | November 10, 2009 |
Sawako tries to clear the rumors about Yano and Yoshida. In the meantime, the school gathers to watch a 'fight' in the girls' bathroom. Sawako is knocked down when she defends Yoshida and Yano. In the meantime, the two girls push their way through the crowd into the bathroom. They both defend Sawako, telling the girls that Sawako would never be the one who started the rumors. Kazehaya makes a public statement on how he hates ridiculous rumors, which affects particularly the girls who were bullying Sawako. With this, everyone begins to talk about Sawako in a more positive way. Sawako, Yano and Yoshida are now even closer than they were before, although Kazehaya realizes that now it will be even tougher for him to be alone with Sawako.
| 7 | "Saturday Night"; Transliteration: "Doyō no Yoru" (Japanese: 土曜の夜) | November 17, 2009 |
Sawako is invited to eat ramen with Yano and Yoshida. They go to the ramen shop, which turns out to be Sanada Ryuu's home. After they eat, they head up to Sanada's room. After Sanada and Yoshida bicker, Sawako asks if they are going out. Ryu smiles, but Yoshida quickly denies the idea. They talk about their middle school, where Sanada, Yoshida and Kazehaya were all in the same class. It is revealed that Kazehaya used to be on the baseball team. They eventually call Kazehaya over, and Yoshida and Yano have fun making him jealous by hogging Sawako. Pin arrives and ruins their fun by telling them to go home. Sanada reveals to Yoshida that his type is someone who is dense and simple, although Yoshida mistakes this for someone who is like Sawako. Sawako and Kazehaya walk home together under the stars.
| 8 | "Voluntary Training"; Transliteration: "Jishuren" (Japanese: 自主練) | November 24, 2009 |
Everyone no longer believes that they'll be cursed by Sawako. Instead, they now believe that when Sawako smiles, good fortune will come. Yano, Yoshida, Endo, and Hirano convince Sawako to call them by their first names. Sawako is both very happy and embarrassed. The girls tease her by having her try calling Kazehaya by his first name, although she is unable to call his last name even without an honorific. Later on, Pin forces Kazehaya to be the committee member for the upcoming sports festival. Everyone gets fired up to win, especially Pin and Chizuru (Yoshida). Class 1-D decided to have practice during lunch break, although Sawako is clumsy because she has never played soccer before. She decides to practice on her own, but is not allowed to borrow a soccer ball. While watering the flowers in the school, Sawako starts kicking rocks and practice for soccer. Kazehaya, who is chatting with his middle school friend Kurumi, sees her from a window. He then brings a ball and helps her practice while a jealous Kurumi watches.
| 9 | "New Friend"; Transliteration: "Atarashii Tomodachi" (Japanese: 新しい友達) | December 1, 2009 |
Thanks to her practice, Sawako has improved at soccer. She is also happy to see Kazehaya playing sports. Later, Sawako runs into Kurumi, whom she perceives as a friendly and beautiful doll-like girl. Kurumi takes the initiative and calls Sawako a doll, which makes her happy. Ayane (Yano) teases Kazehaya by asking him to call Sawako by her first name, which he can't do. In the meantime, Sawako starts noticing how Kurumi and Kazehaya appear to be close, and wishes to also become cute like Kurumi. Later on, Hirano and Endo allow Sawako to call them "Ekko" and "Tomo". When she encounters Kurumi, who interrupts her conversation with Kazehaya, she unconsciously starts becoming jealous, but is also happy that Kurumi is becoming friends with her.
| 10 | "Working Together"; Transliteration: "Kyōryoku" (Japanese: 協力) | December 8, 2009 |
Everyone prepares for the sports festival, especially Chizuru, who coaches Sawako enthusiastically. Sawako happily reflects upon her growing friendship with Kurumi and her increasing awkwardness around Kazehaya. Kurumi purposely tells Sawako how she isn't special because Kazehaya always treats everyone kindly, although Sawako misunderstands this as Kurumi telling her about Kazehaya's good points. Sawako aspires to be outgoing and friendly like Kurumi, but Chizuru tells the story of how she dislikes Kurumi because Kurumi made her help the girls confess to Kazehaya in middle school. Kazehaya and Sawako eventually get to talk alone, but Kurumi interrupts the conversation. Sawako finds out that "Kurumi" is short for "Kurumizawa", so Kazehaya wasn't calling her by her first name after all. Later, Kurumi makes Sawako walk with her confesses that she likes Kazehaya, asking for Sawako's help.
| 11 | "Special?"; Transliteration: "Tokubetsu?" (Japanese: とくべつ？) | December 15, 2009 |
Sawako admits that she cannot help Kurumi confess to Kazehaya. Kurumi yells at Sawako, telling her she did nothing to get Kazehaya's attention while "cute and popular girls" like herself need to work a lot harder. Sawako begins considering whether she only likes Kazehaya because he is nice to her, and whether she would like any guy who did the same. The Sports Day competitions begin. The girls in Sawako's class win their first soccer match, and Sawako convinces Kurumi to watch Kazehaya play in the boys' match together. As they talk, Sawako mentions that she has always thought of Kazehaya as special. Kurumi tells her that this is just because she doesn't talk to many guys, so she ought to try talking to others. Just then, Ryuu (Sanada) saves Sawako from a rogue pitch. Kurumi suggests that Sawako should talk to Ryuu more.
| 12 | "Romantic Feelings"; Transliteration: "Ren'ai Kanjō" (Japanese: 恋愛感情) | December 22, 2009 |
Kurumi tells Sawako to talk to Ryuu and maybe she'll realize something. Sawako doesn't really understand that Kurumi wants her to separate from Kazehaya, but she says she will still talk to Ryuu. During the softball game Sawako can't keep her eyes off Kazehaya, which makes Kurumi angry as she thinks she is the only one always watching Kazehaya, so she leaves. Kurumi then starts her plan by planting a note asking Ryuu to meet Sawako at the sports equipment room, where Kazehaya has to go later. Sawako, is told by Kurumi that Ryuu is there, and goes to thank him. When they meet, Sawako asks Ryuu about the feeling of love, which leads him to confess that he likes Chizuru. In the meantime, Kazehaya heads to the room carrying some equipment. Kurumi goes up to him and tells Kazehaya that Sawako has fallen in love with Ryuu, urging him to support their relationship. They see Sawako and Ryuu talking happily together.
| 13 | "Love"; Transliteration: "Koi" (Japanese: 恋) | January 5, 2010 |
After seeing Sawako and Ryuu together, Kazehaya rushes up to Sawako and pulls her away, leaving Kurumi behind. Kazehaya then confirms with Sawako that she doesn't like Ryuu, while Sawako has just realized that she really likes Kazehaya. Kazehaya asks her what she thinks about people going out as girlfriend and boyfriend, which shocks her so much that she cannot answer properly. Later, Ayane finds out that Kurumi was the one who spread the rumours. Ryuu then shows them the note written by Kurumi, which confirms that she set Sawako up. Ayane and Chizuru go to find more evidence against Kurumi, who is in the meantime waiting for Kazehaya to return. Pin arrives at the equipment room and comes to the conclusion that Kurumi has a crush on him, and rejects her just as Kazehaya arrives. Ayane and Chizuru confront Kurumi, who will not admit to wrongdoing, but when Sawako arrives, Ayane tells her outright that Kurumi was the one who spread the rumors.
| 14 | "Kurumi"; Transliteration: "Kurumi" (Japanese: くるみ) | January 12, 2010 |
After Sawako finds out that Kurumi was the one who spread the rumors, Kurumi admits it. Ayane threatens to tell Kazehaya, although Kurumi claims that she doesn't care. Sawako asks Ayane and Chizuru not to tell, realizing that Kurumi is probably hurting a lot. Sawako realizes that Kurumi must have needed a lot of courage to tell Sawako how she felt about Kazehaya. She realizes that she must return the favor, so she returns and tells Kurumi that she, too, loves Kazehaya.
| 15 | "Rival"; Transliteration: "Raibaru" (Japanese: ライバル) | January 19, 2010 |
Kurumi reflects on how she met and fell in love with Kazehaya in middle school. In the meantime, rumors about how she was rejected by Pin spread around the school. She realizes that she hates being misunderstood by Kazehaya, so ends up confessing to him. He apologizes, saying he has someone else he loves. She plays it off as "his loss" and says that he has bad taste in women. Meanwhile, Sawako confesses her love for Kazehaya to Yano and Chizu. Later, Sawako and Kurumi meet and Sawako asks if they can be friends. Kurumi responds by saying she isn't Sawako's friend, but her rival. Later, during the after-festival party, Sawako wonders when she fell in love with Kazehaya and ends up falling asleep on his shoulder.
| 16 | "Night Talk"; Transliteration: "Yobanashi" (Japanese: 夜噺) | January 26, 2010 |
This episode is a recap of episodes 1 through 15 narrated by the tiny men Pin sees.
| 17 | "Day Off"; Transliteration: "Kyūjitsu" (Japanese: 休日) | February 2, 2010 |
Ayane and Chizuru visit Sawako's house and, despite appearing disreputable at first, impress her parents by being "such nice girls". Meanwhile, Kazehaya and Ryuu are together when Kazehaya gets a call from Pin. Pin explains that he met Sawako the previous night, and now thinks he is possessed because he doesn't feel good. The truth is that Sawako noticed he was catching a cold, and gave him advice on how to prevent it, although he misunderstood. Pin insists that Kazehaya bring Sawako to him right away. Kazehaya, Ryuu, Sawako, Ayane and Chizuru all end up at Pin's filthy apartment and realize he only has a cold. They spend the rest of the day cleaning for him. They leave at night and Kazehaya ends up walking Sawako home. Thanks to a prank played by Pin, the two of them almost kissed under the stars.
| 18 | "Chizuru's Love"; Transliteration: "Chizuru no Koi" (Japanese: 千鶴の恋) | February 9, 2010 |
Sawako is happy about her growing relationships with her friends and Kazehaya. Ayane, however, complains about her clingy boyfriend, while Chizuru is in a good mood because she anticipates something at New Year's, which is more than a month away. Chizuru and Sawako go out to pick a present for Ryuu's birthday, and Sawako is sure by the affection Chizuru shows for him that Chizuru loves Ryuu. However, she finds out that Chizuru actually loves Ryuu's older brother. The next time everyone is in school together, it is found out that Ayane dumped her boyfriend. Amid the talk about broken hearts, Ryuu leaves the room and is encouraged by Kazehaya. Later, at Chizuru's house, Ryuu comes into her room unexpectedly. He appears to be about to confess to Chizuru when she notices that she left his present lying out in plain sight. She therefore forces Ryuu to leave, and he ends up going home in the rain.
| 19 | "Dream"; Transliteration: "Yume" (Japanese: 夢) | February 16, 2010 |
Ryuu tries to confront Chizuru again, but fails to do so, and only tells her not to come to his house this weekend. Chizuru throws a sleep over with the intention of cheer Ayane up from her breakup, but it ends up to be boring because Chizuru planned on getting video games from Ryuu. Ayane convinces Chizuru to go over to his house since it is only Friday, and not yet the weekend. At Ryuu's house they meet Kazehaya and other classmates. They are all having fun, until Ryuu leaves and Chizuru follows, Ryuu once again tries to confess his feelings to Chizuru but is interrupted by his older brother's arrival. His older brother then reveals that he is engaged, Ayane and Sawako look on as Chizuru hides her feelings and congratulate the couple. Soon everyone leaves, and the girls go back to Chizuru's house where Chizuru reflects on her past with Ryuu's brother.
| 20 | "Present"; Transliteration: "Purezento" (Japanese: プレゼント) | February 23, 2010 |
Ryuu's brother leaves, he tells Ryuu to tell Chizuru to show up next time. Later Chizuru heads over to give Ryuu her present, where Ryuu states that she was late and he hopes that Chizuru will finally get over his brother, she gets angry and throws his present at him. Sawako and Ayane are grief stricken with worry about Chizuru since they can't do anything about the situation. Kazehaya shows up and explains to them that its good that Chizuru has them, and that she has them to worry and care for her. In class Chizuru ignores Ryuu, they eventually run into each other where Chizuru asks what he meant last night when he said that she was late. Eventually he shows that he wanted Chizuru to get rejected in order for her to finally get over his brother, Chizuru is upset that he thought the only reason she came over the other night was just to see his brother and leaves. Ayane and Sawako find her, where she eventually breaks down and tells them about how angry she is at Ryuu, not knowing that he is listening and then leaves, Chizuru continues saying what pissed her off the most was how she treated Ryuu. The three girls then go out and enjoy the rest of the day.
| 21 | "First Snow"; Transliteration: "Hatsuyuki" (Japanese: 初雪) | March 2, 2010 |
School continues and Chizuru looks refreshed but still ignores Ryuu. While walking home with Sawako and Ayane, they discuss what Chizuru would say to Tooru, Ryuu's older brother if he was to return. Then Tooru actually shows up and tells the girls that he's going to steal Chizuru. The two of them walk together, as Tooru talks about his memories with Chizuru when they were younger. At the end of their walk Chizuru confesses her feelings for Tooru, only have to Tooru says that he likes her too, but as a little sister. They part, and when Tooru returns home Ryuu greets him and gives him bread from the other day the Chizuru left. Ryuu then goes to find Chizuru at docks where she was the last time they played with Tooru before he moved out. There Chizuru realizes that it was Ryuu that called Tooru to come and visit her and asks Ryuu to comfort her, and they embrace.
| 22 | "Christmas"; Transliteration: "Kurisumasu" (Japanese: クリスマス) | March 9, 2010 |
Chizuru and Ryuu are back on good terms and everyone is eagerly anticipating Christmas. Their class is going to hold a party and Kazehaya asks Sawako to come. She really wants to, but thinks of her parents. Traditionally, her family spends all day celebrating, so she would feel bad about leaving them. She decides not to go to the party, but makes gifts for Chizuru and Ayane. She also makes a hat for Kazehaya, though she knows she won't have the nerve to give it to him. On Christmas Eve, she spends the day with her parents. Her dad is especially enthusiastic and ends up taking the hat Sawako made, thinking it was for him. She doesn't have the heart to correct him. Later that night, she gets a call from her friends at the party asking her to come. She becomes very distraught, so her mom takes the call instead. Her dad calls her over and gives her his present for her- a cellphone. He lets her go to the party and realizes she is growing up. Sawako runs there, but everyone has left. Only Kazehaya has been waiting for her out in the snow.
| 23 | "The Two"; Transliteration: "Futari" (Japanese: ふたり) | March 16, 2010 |
It's the last day of class before winter break. Sawako worries that she won't see her friends until classes start again. She reluctantly says goodbye to Kazehaya then goes out to eat with Ayane and Chizuru. They find out her birthday is on New Year's Eve and tell her about their plans to go to the shrine that day with Ryuu, inviting her as well. She finds out she can go, so her friends convince her to call Kazehaya and invite him as well. He agrees to come. On New Year's Eve, Chizuru and Ayane come to Sawako's house. Their present to her is to make her look really cute for Kazehaya. They style her hair and put on a little makeup and head out for the shrine. Before they arrive, Chizuru and Ayane leave, telling Sawako Ryuu actually isn't coming either. She continues alone, meeting Kazehaya. He is astonished by her extra-cuteness and they continue to the shrine. She reflects on her happiness to spend her birthday with him.
| 24 | "Birthday"; Transliteration: "Tanjōbi" (Japanese: 誕生日) | March 23, 2010 |
Sawako and Kazehaya walk to the shrine silently. They finally look at each other after Kazehaya saves her before she falls down the stairs at the shrine. They are about to continue their awkward silence until Chizuru, Ayane, and Ryuu (who are also stealthily at the shrine) call Kazehaya to apologize for not coming along. The two go to get hot drinks at a stand and Kazehaya admits he normally doesn't like the drink, but this time he does because Sawako does. She's excited over getting to see his first time at something, but he lists several of his first times that relate to her (like wearing the stomach band). They exchange phone emails and Kazehaya realizes Sawako's birthday is that day. She tells him about her childhood as they walk, up until the present, then realizes she had always been alone until she met him.
| 25 | "New Year"; Transliteration: "Shinnen" (Japanese: 新年) | March 30, 2010 |
Sawako and Kazehaya continue talking while they walk. She begins to say she'll try harder this year so people will like her, but he interrupts and says they already do. They visit the shrine and go to pick out fortunes. Sawako is distressed by getting a "Bad Luck" slip, so Kazehaya gives her his- "Very Good Luck". She reads the part pertaining to love and realizes it could be talking about Kazehaya. They continue home, taking the path she walks to school. Kazehaya stops at one corner, and reminisces that he met Sawako for the first time at that spot. She's surprised he remembers, but has also been thinking the same thing. They continue home, each internally realizing their love for each other, but neither acting on it. They part, leaving the impression they will be together this year.

=== Season 2 (2011) ===
| No. | Title | Original release date |
|---|---|---|
| 26 | "Unrequited Love"; Transliteration: "Kataomoi" (Japanese: 片想い) | January 5, 2011 |
Based on Kurumi's point of view, she retells the events of Season 1; such as her unrequited love for Kazehaya, how she observes him observing Sawako with expressions she has never seen before and how he has changed because of her. She recalls her plot of matchmaking Ryu and Sawako together, and how Kazehaya foiled her plan by taking Sawako away from the scene. She remembers Sawako ultimately giving her the courage to confess her feelings to Kazehaya, and her subsequent rejection. She buys chocolate to give him on Valentine's the next day, calling it "the first and the last", and she imagines what Sawako and her friends Ayane and Chizu, would be doing for Valentine's Day. The episode ends with her exclaiming that she'd bought him the most expensive chocolate.
| 27 | "Valentine"; Transliteration: "Barentain" (Japanese: バレンタイン) | January 12, 2011 |
It is now the third semester, and after another seating change, Sawako makes friends with the new people sitting close to her, but can't help but feel lonely that Kazehaya is sitting further away from her. The day before Valentine's Day, she makes handmade chocolate for her friends. When it comes to Kazehaya's chocolate, she notices that she has unknowingly favored him among everyone else and becomes very self-conscious. She manages to give everyone their chocolate the next day but still hesitates when it comes to giving Kazehaya his. Various events throughout the day prevent her from giving it to him, such as his acceptance of "Gratitude" chocolate and his rejection of "Love" chocolate. Sawako finally makes up her mind to give it to him after school, but is interrupted by Kurumi, who gives him his "first and last" chocolate from her. Kurumi notices Sawako eavesdropping and tells her that Kazehaya doesn't accept 'love' chocolate, but if it was a 'gratitude' chocolate, he would probably accept it gladly. She calls herself 'a special circumstance' because she had already been rejected by him. Sawako ends up not being able to give Kazehaya the chocolate, as she thinks that her chocolates are too serious to be considered 'giri/courtesy' chocolates. As Kazehaya walks out of school, thinking that he had really hoped on getting something from Sawako. At the end of the episode, a new character, Miura Kento, makes his appearance.
| 28 | "2nd-Year Students"; Transliteration: "2-Nensei" (Japanese: 2年生) | January 19, 2011 |
April brings Sawako into her second year of high school, and she is happy that she gets to be in the same class as Kazehaya, Ayane and Chizu again. Things have become strained between Sawako and Kazehaya ever since the Valentine's Day incident. In class, a new classmate, Miura Kento takes his seat next to Sawako. He is flamboyant and very open with her, which stirs up jealousy on Kazehaya's part. Kazehaya decides to wait for Sawako to finish tending the flowerbeds. He watches her work from the classroom window. Then, he encounters Ayane who offers to help him in his pursue of love (for Sawako, although it isn't explicitly stated). However, he tells her that he would prefer to tell the person themselves about his feelings for them, instead of involving a third party. Ayane notes that Kazehaya is the type of person who does not like others interfering with his affairs. Sawako finds Kazehaya waiting for her, and he asks her if he was too conceited to consider himself as her closest male friend (due to Kento's previous display of closeness towards her). She panics, not knowing how to reply and Kazehaya notices this. He apologizes for troubling her, and leaves. Kento sees Kazehaya leaving the classroom, and notices Sawako still inside at a loss for words. He makes the connection between them, calling the two 'an interesting combination'.
| 29 | "Forget What I Said"; Transliteration: "Wasurete" (Japanese: 忘れて) | January 26, 2011 |
Sawako is still troubled over what Kazehaya said to her in the previous episode and wonders how she should have responded to him. In class, Kento tries to help Sawako smile "refreshingly" but fails. Kazehaya is visibly jealous over how close the two are. Kazehaya and Ryu talk during gym class, and Kazehaya expresses worry over how he had troubled Sawako over what he had said about being the closest to her. He feels that, even though it may trouble her further, he has to stop beating around the bush and act soon; otherwise, she may be snatched away by someone else. Ayane confronts Kento, telling him to stop making passes at Sawako, as it is a critical time for her to pursue Kazehaya. Kento brushes her off, telling her that he has good intentions. The teacher talks about the upcoming exams and Kento announces to the class that Sawako is holding a crash course after school. Kazehaya helps spread the word and brings a lot of people to the study group. During the session, everyone praises Sawako for being such a great teacher. She genuinely smiles, making Kazehaya feel lonely as she is now fitting in the class without his help, and surprises Kento that she is able to smile normally. After everyone leaves, Sawako thanks Kazehaya for helping her. Kazehaya tells her to forget about what he had said earlier. He leaves, with a dejected expression on his face. Outside, Kazehaya finds Kento waiting for him.
| 30 | "Misunderstood"; Transliteration: "Wakattenai" (Japanese: わかってない) | February 2, 2011 |
Sawako is still troubled by what Kazehaya told her in the previous episode, to just "forget" about what he had told her earlier. Sawako wonders what Kazehaya meant by that as she walks home. Meanwhile, Kento pulled Kazehaya outside to talk with him about Sawako, and how much of an outcast she was until Kazehaya started talking to her, and also tells Kazehaya that he shouldn't get to close to Sawako anymore or the other girls will get mad and Sawako will become an outcast again. Kazehaya gets mad and tells Kento that he does the things he does for a reason. Kento stands up and tells Kazehaya that Sawako would be hurt by it. As Kazehaya walks away, Kento shouts to him, asking if Kazehaya has a person he likes. When Kazehaya responds "I do!", Kento asks if he could help Kazehaya, but he rejects the idea. Chizuru and Kazehaya meet up on the way home, and Kazehaya asks if he is really that different from Sawako, as he thought he was the closest to her. Chizuru takes what he said the wrong way and tells him that he doesn't understand her, thinking "he doesn't even know that Sawako likes him!". Chizuru also says that Kazehaya is the most different from Sawako, because of the experiences with rumors that she went through. They part ways, Chizuru wondering what is up with Kazehaya all of a sudden. The next day, Sawako tries to greet Kazehaya, but stutters, and Kazehaya almost ignores her, briefly whispering "good morning", and then runs to catch up with his friends. Ayane and Chizuru see this and pull Sawako aside to find out what happened. After Sawako explains to Ayane and Chizuru about what Kazehaya said the two days, Ayane looks upon the situation and tries to explain things to Sawako. After Sawako leaves for classroom duty, Ayane and Chiruzu find Kazehaya and Ryu in the hallway, and Ayane kicks Kazehyaya and tells him to stop avoiding Sawako. Chizuru asks Ayane what that was all about, and Ayane says "well, the girl Kazehaya likes acts like she's terrified of him.", and Chizuru goes crazy, feeling sorry for Sawako that Kazehaya likes someone. Chizuru finally realizes that the girl Kazehaya likes is Sawako, and Ayane and Chizuru argue on why it's such a problem. Chiruzu thinks back at what she said to Kazehaya the previous day and realizes that she screwed up and if she doesn't do something soon things are going to go badly. Sawako enters the classroom, and everyone starts praising her on how amazing her study sessions are. Inside, Kazehaya watches Sawako from the back of the classroom, with a dejected look on his face.
| 31 | "The Person That I Like"; Transliteration: "Suki na Hito" (Japanese: すきな人) | February 9, 2011 |
With the first semester midterms over, everyone's recognizing Sawako for her review session, praising her. Sawako's class decides on having "Sawako's Black Magic Cafe" as their exhibition, using Sawako's herbs to make tea, and having an additional "Ask Sawako" advice booth. Sawako and Kazehaya are still awkward and silent towards each other, which Ayane notices and worries Chizuru. Next day, Ayane goes over to Chizuru's house to help her get ready for Toru's Wedding. The wedding ends without a hitch and Chi solidifies her sibling-like relationship with Toru. Afterwards, Chizuru asks Ryu to follow up with Kazehaya, feeling guilty about what she said to him. Ryu initially refuses but concedes, saying he would only listen to his problems. Later, Kento approaches Sawako, who's tending to her garden. Back in the cafeteria, Ryu, still keeping in mind what Chizuru said, asked Kazehaya, bluntly, if he had confessed already or not. As Kazehaya's explaining his confusion and worry, Pin arrives, teases him about not having confessed yet and mocks him, telling him to confess to Sawako already. Kazehaya, determined, runs out, searching for Sawako. Out in the courtyard, Kento and Sawako are discussing how Sawako's finally fitting into class. She receives a mental shock when Kento says that Kazehaya was probably looking out for her because she was an outcast, and since now she's not, he probably wouldn't talk to her anymore, and that he is in love with someone, both not realizing it's Sawako herself. Sawako, distraught, walks away and starts to cry. Kento tries to cheer her up, and ends up asking her out in the flow of things, only to be drowned out by Sawako's thoughts and the arrival of Kazehaya.
| 32 | "Affection and Annoyance"; Transliteration: "Kōi to Meiwaku" (Japanese: 好意と迷惑) | February 16, 2011 |
Kazehaya walks out on Sawako and Kento, with Kento grasping Sawako's arms and Sawako crying. Kazehaya asks what Kento is doing, and why Sawako is crying. Three of Kazehaya's friends walk over, to find Kazehaya angry, Sawako crying, and Kento just being there. When the three of them fool around and say that Kazehaya and Kento are both going after Sawako, Kazehaya finally cracks and confesses his love to Sawako. Sawako takes the confession as a misunderstanding and tells Kazehaya that if he says it that way, people will get the wrong idea. Kazehaya finally walks away, and Sawako follows. Kazehaya and Sawako skip class, and when Kazehaya asks her if she likes him, she says yes, but Kazehaya takes it in the way as just being friends and walks off, leaving Sawako alone in the alley. Pin finally finds Sawako, and after Sawako tells Pin that she has been rejected by Kazehaya, Pin tries to cheer her up. Ayane and Chizuru are also looking for Sawako and they have a feeling that Kento was a major part of it. They ask Kento where she is, and Kento says that she's outside by the benches. Kento tries to follow, but is interrupted by Kurumi, who makes Kento tell her what happened. Pin is still outside comforting Sawako, but is interrupted by Ayane and Chizuru. They ask what happened to Sawako, and before Ayane finished explaining something, Chizuru breaks out in tears and tells Sawako that she's in the wrong, and Kazehaya is only angry because of the actions that Sawako took and yells at her to stop being self conscious. Chizuru finally takes off, Ayane following her. The episode ends with Sawako asking herself if she had really done her best with Kazehaya up until this point.
| 33 | "Just Give Up"; Transliteration: "Akirame Chimae Yo" (Japanese: あきらめちまえよ) | February 23, 2011 |
The class is finally starting to prepare for the school festival, and everyone is wondering where Sawako is, in which Chizuru and Ayane say that she had somewhere else to be. Ryu finds Kazehaya outside as soon as he is done with baseball practice, and asks Kazehaya how his confession went. Kazehaya tells Ryu he was rejected, and that the rejection hurt a lot more than he thought it would, though he is unaware that Kurumi overheard the conversation, and she runs off to find Sawako. After confronting Sawako, Kurumi snaps at Sawako and tells her that she is hurting Kazehaya because of her indecisiveness, and that since Kurumi actually told Kazehaya how she felt for him, she tells her they are not on the same level. That night, Kazehaya and Pin run into each other, and Pin starts yelling at Kazehaya for rejecting Sawako. Kazehaya explains that he was rejected, and Pin tells Kazehaya to just give up on Sawako and walks off, leaving Kazehaya to think for himself. The next day people are talking about the "battlefield" between Kazehaya, Sawako, and Kento, and after Sawako hears people talking about it, she says it was all a misunderstanding and that the meaning of "like" is different, not realizing Kazehaya is standing right there. Ayane and Chizuru take Kento away, as he had said very loudly that Kazehaya liked Sawako in front of everyone. Ayane gets mad at Kento, and starts yelling at him, when Kurumi interrupts. Kento asks Kurumi what she did after she learned about what happened between Kazehaya and Sawako, and Ayane and Chizuru start questioning her. They find out that Kurumi stopped Sawako from giving Kazehaya the Valentine's Day Chocolate and told her off. Kento also finds out that Kurumi likes Kazehaya, and asks her if it would make it easier for her if he went out with Sawako. Kurumi slaps Kento across the face and tells him not to get ahead of himself. Kurumi also says that she didn't think she would lose to such a weak girl, and runs off. Ayane scolds Kento for causing Kazehaya and Sawako so much drama and tells him to leave them alone. As Ayane and Chizuru leave, he finally gets everything straight through his head. Sawako goes in the library, telling herself that she really didn't tell Kazehaya how she was feeling, or anything like that, and that she really wasn't doing anything up to this point.
| 34 | "Reach..."; Transliteration: "Todoke" (Japanese: 届け) | March 2, 2011 |
The School Festival begins and everything goes well. In the end Sawako doesn't care if Kazehaya likes someone or not, and she gets ready to confess to him.
| 35 | "Confession"; Transliteration: "Kokuhaku" (Japanese: 告白) | March 9, 2011 |
Despite being nervous and embarrassed, Sawako goes to the classroom to confront Kazehaya. Before Sawako has a chance to tell Kazehaya how she feels, Kazehaya apologizes to her for making her cry and angry, and that he would listen to her no matter what, because his feelings wouldn't change. He then says that Chizuru and Ayane are probably outside, but Sawako interrupts and says that she came to talk to Kazehaya, not to Chizuru or Ayane. Sawako tells Kazehaya about people apologizing to her for everything she did, and that she was thankful that Kazehaya smiled and said "thank you". She thanks him for his smiles, kindness, and telling her his hidden feelings. Kazehaya is about to say something when Sawako interrupts with "I like you", and keeps on repeating it. Kazehaya pulls Sawako into the classroom by the hand and shuts the door. Meanwhile, Joe is looking outside for Kazehaya and Pin is looking for Sawako. When Chizuru and Ayane tell Pin she went home, Pin heads towards the classroom to look for Kazehaya. However, Kazehaya and Sawako are hugging to the side of the classroom door, unaware of anything else. They stare right at each other, Kazehaya realizing they both have the same feelings, and Sawako still being confused. After a minute Joe walks into the classroom and Kazehaya and Sawako pull away from each other. Sawako runs off, and Kazehaya becomes embarrassed and upset. Later that night, Ayane and Chizuru ask how the talk went, and Sawako says she wasn't able to say 1/10 of her feelings to Kazehaya. Pin walks in and pulls Sawako outside, where Sawako breaks down and tells Pin she can't look at Kazehaya without secret feelings. Pin replies that everyone has a heart, so Kazehaya probably has the same feelings. He runs off, telling her not to worry about it and for her to do well in the solo performance. He's heading home when he realizes he said something "super wonderful" and runs off to find Kazehaya. Kazehaya is sending a text to someone when Pin barges in telling him that it's okay to have secret feeling and such, but Kazehaya tells him to go home. Pin is still yelling outside when Kazehaya finally sends his text. Ayane and Chizuru wish Sawako good luck, as she is going to talk to Kazehaya again tomorrow. The end of the episode shows the text was to Sawako, and both of them are wishing for tomorrow to come so they can see each other again.
| 36 | "From Now On"; Transliteration: "Koko kara" (Japanese: ここから) | March 23, 2011 (Note: Episode 10 was replaced with a rebroadcast of the first episode after a 9.0 earthquake and tsunami struck Japan on March 11.) |
The class finishes the costumes. For the solo performance in her class' costume parade Sawako once again plays a ghost, this time acting out the reemergence of Okiku from the well from the Japanese ghost story (kaidan) Banchō Sarayashiki. Kazehaya ensures that Sawako knows his feelings. When he is about to finally talk to Sawako, Jo comes to interrupt but is quickly taken away by the gang- Ryu and the two girls. Kazehaya is about to confess properly to Sawako when she interrupts him saying she wants to go first. She tells him that she wants to know more about him and build their new relationship from scratch. She asks him to watch her perform as she will try her best to win for everyone's sake. Afraid she might break down in front of him, Sawako quickly leaves for her spot on the parade. Kazehaya smiles and confidently shouts out to her saying that he likes her. Everyone turns to them in surprise, including Sawako who blushes. Sawako gives a brilliant performance but gives cold drinks to the judges as part of the act which was suggested by Pin. The drink is considered bribery (which Pin had originally intended for) and their class ends up getting no points for the parade. Nonetheless, they earn sixth place in the competition. At the end of the episode, everyone seems to be gathering for the after party where Kazehaya comes to Sawako and they chat more openly about their newfound relationship.
| 37 | "After the Festival"; Transliteration: "Matsuri no Ato" (Japanese: 祭りのあと) | March 30, 2011 |
With the school festival finally over, Sawako leaves home to go to an after the festival party. She meets up with Kazehaya and they continue walking to the party. When they get there they find Joe reenacting all of the details from when Sawako and Kazehaya confessed to each other. Everyone is saying that Sawako got Kazehaya with black magic, but Kazehaya immediately clears up that misunderstanding. After the party the class goes to the beach, where Kento pulls Kazehaya aside and tells him why Sawako was crying the other day. Pin also pulls Sawako aside to ask her if she told Kazehaya about her secret feelings. Kazehaya walks over and Pin makes him ask Sawako out, but while Kazehaya was at a loss for words Pin shouted "WILL YOU MARRY ME!" causing a misunderstanding on Sawako's part. Kazehaya follows her after she ran off, and she explains that she didn't take it seriously, when Kazehaya thought she did. After that was cleared up, Kazehaya finally asks out Sawako, who accepts, and Sawako tells Kazehaya about her secret feelings. Ayane, Chizu, Kento, and Kurumi are watching from above. The next day in school everyone has heard about the confession and now that Sawako and Kazehaya are dating. People go up to Sawako, hoping she can help them find boyfriends/girlfriends. In the classroom, Kazehaya tells everyone, under influence by Ayane, that Sawako is his girlfriend. Everything is no longer chaotic, Kento sees how perfect Sawako and Kazehaya are together, and he expresses his feelings in his thoughts that no one would have thought Sawako would win Kazehaya and Kurumi would end up with a broken heart. At the end of the episode the girls from Class A who bullied Sawako find out about Kazehaya and Sawako's new relationship.
| 38 | "Important Person"; Transliteration: "Daiji na Hito" (Japanese: 大事な人) | March 30, 2011 |
The show starts with many students crowding up the locker area in the morning just as Sawako reaches school with Ayane & Chizuru. News about her current girlfriend-boyfriend relationship with Kazehaya has gotten out. Kazehaya is later made to announce and clearly state his and Sawako's relationship so as to avoid further misunderstandings. Sawako then goes to confront Kurumi after overhearing Ayane saying to Chizuru that 'there's one girl who's definitely crying' The same group of girls who harassed Sawako in the bathroom in season one gossips and badmouth Sawako near the windowsills and is heard by Kurumi who interfered with the conversation. They throw accusations at each other not long before Sawako appears standing in a distance, just listening to their talk. The group of girls go up against Sawako to tell her off and starts insulting her before Kurumi defended Sawako by simply saying 'Kazehaya will not forgive you if you hurt her' which the girls then threatened to tell Kazehaya Kurumi's illdoings. Kurumi simply urged them to and said that 'let him think of you for what you told him' as Kazehaya greatly dislike tattlers. Kurumi walks off. The girls try to follow after only to be stopped by Sawako who determinedly said to let her as she was Kurumi's true rival. The girls irritated with Sawako tried to follow only to be stopped again by Chizuru and Ayane who somewhat tell them off while comforting them by stating the harsh reality that 'you only hate Sawako because Kazehaya is in love with her now' At the rooftop, Sawako tells Kurumi that she has confessed and they're dating, even though Kurumi already knows from the many gossips. Just as Sawako was about to leave, Kurumi stops Sawako and confesses that the only reason she had the courage and confidence to profess her love for Kazehaya back then was because of Sawako. Sawako stares in surprise as Kurumi walks off without a word. Later near the locker area, just as Kurumi was about to leave, Miura approaches Kurumi and asks if she would have been happy if he were to have managed to make Sawako fall in love with him which Kurumi promptly replied no as it was impossible. Kurumi also mentions her surprise at how Sawako did not thank her nor apologize earlier at the rooftop but is glad as Kurumi would have punched her if she did. Ayane then appears, touching Kurumi's shoulders, somewhat comforting her, telling she and Kazehaya would never have been possible but that Kazehaya would have forgiven her if he knew all of what she'd done, which Kurumi thought about for a moment bitterly and said she didn't need Ayane to tell her that before walking off in tears, with Muira and Ayane following behind. Sawako and Chizuru is seen near their class's little garden tending to the flowers. Sawako is upset at not being able to say more to Kurumi on the rooftop, and Chizuru comforts Sawako and tells her it was the right thing to do and that she would have done the same. Ryu and Kazehaya approaches them which Chizuru quickly takes up the opportunity and grab Ryu's arm running off leaving Sawako and Kazehaya alone together. As they walked off, Ryu catches Chizuru offguard by telling her he likes her. Chizuru is surprised. She runs after Ryu, bumps him in the back and tells him she already knew that. Sawako and Kazehaya part ways outside their school. Kazehaya is seen riding away before Sawako stops him but when Kazehaya turns around, replies saying its nothing although she might have wanted to mention about Kurumi. Sawako is seen crying for Kurumi's situation and promises to herself that she will treasure Kazehaya always, as a way to honor Kurumi. (After the credits) Kazehaya goes on a date with Sawako. After spending a day together, Sawako and Kazehaya seats on a nearby park as she hands him his rightful Christmas gift and valentine chocolates. Kazehaya puts on the cap immediately and gobbles up the chocolates commenting on how good it tastes. Sawako cries, saying she never had to courage to until now and that she does not know how to be a good girlfriend. Kazehaya embraces her, telling it is not a job and to just be herself.

=== Season 3 (2024) ===
| No. | Title | Original release date |
|---|---|---|
| 39 | "There's No Way I Would Hate You"; Transliteration: "Kirai ni Nante Naru Wakeganai n da" (Japanese: 嫌いになんてなるわけがないんだ) | August 1, 2024 |
It is finally Summer vacation, but the gang are stuck attending Summer school. Sawako navigates being in a relationship with Kazehaya. They spend time together as a couple with growing feelings. Sawako struggles with telling her parents, particularly her father, about her relationship with Kazehaya. She is also met with the task of meeting Kazehaya's parents for the first time.
| 40 | "School Trip"; Transliteration: "Shūgakuryokō" (Japanese: 修学旅行) | August 1, 2024 |
It is the beginning of the second term, which means the highly-anticipated school trip is approaching. Sawako and her classmates will be travelling to Okinawa for the school trip. She is excited to take lots of pictures and spend time together with her friends. Whilst on the trip, in an intimate moment, Sawako and Kazehaya almost kiss. Ayane is asked out by Mogi from Class B and agrees to date him. While things between the two progress very quickly in Okinawa, Ayane has doubts about the relationship. She contemplates her past relationships and experience with love. As she struggles with her perspective on love and her relationship, an unexpected person is there to comfort her. Meanwhile, Chizu is awkward with Ryu after their intimate encounter. Tension escalates between the two after a female classmate confesses to Ryu and after being rejected, confronts Chizu. This leads Ryu to make his own confession.
| 41 | "Girlfriend and Boyfriend"; Transliteration: "Kareshi to Kanojo" (Japanese: 彼氏と彼女) | August 1, 2024 |
After the school trip to Okinawa, things have changed. Sawako senses Kazehaya is distant. Ayane tries to avoid Kento. And while Chizu and Ryu seem to be acting normal, it is clear that things are not the same. Chizu is struggling with how to deal with Ryu. As it all becomes too much for her, she skips school and is uncontactable. She is found by Sawako and Ayane thanks to the help of Ryu and Kazehaya. Chizu has a heart-to-heart with Sawako and Ayane, detailing her history with Ryu.
| 42 | "Christmas Party"; Transliteration: "Kurisumasu Pātī" (Japanese: クリスマスパーティー) | August 1, 2024 |
It is finally Christmas time! Kazehaya organizes a class Christmas party for after the end-of-term ceremony. Sawako is happy that she and Kazehaya get to celebrate Christmas together as a couple, albeit with everyone else at the class party and not together alone to Ayane's dismay. However, Kazehaya's distance worries Sawako. She reaches out to him, but he shuts her down, leaving her devastated. Truthfully, Kazehaya fears ruining his relationship with Sawako if she sees the real him. Kento continues to pursue Ayane. She rejects him, believing that he is too good for her. After hearing from Kazehaya about her past negative experiences with relationships, he is more determined to give her his love. Meanwhile, Sawako learns the truth about Ayane's true feelings. During the Christmas party, Kazehaya seemingly avoids Sawako. With things being awkward with Ryu, Chizu attempts to secretly give him a present by the gift exchange, but is intercepted by Joe. This results in her snatching back the gift and running away from the party with Ryu going after her. The two are able to exchange their gifts for each other and spend time talking, easing the tension between them. Kento gets in a heated exchange with Mogi after learning about the true events of what happened between him and Ayane. With a sense of urgency, Sawako tells Ayane to come out. Kento leaves after Ayane arrives. After some hesitation and a push from Pin, Ayane goes after Kento.
| 43 | "Happy Moment"; Transliteration: "Shiawase na Hitotoki" (Japanese: 幸せなひととき) | August 1, 2024 |

== DVD releases ==
Japanese season 1 DVD releases
| Volume | Date | Episodes |
|---|---|---|
| Volume 1 | December 23, 2009 | 1-3 |
| Volume 2 | January 27, 2010 | 4-6 |
| Volume 3 | February 24, 2010 | 7-9 |
| Volume 4 | March 26, 2010 | 10-12 |
| Volume 5 | April 21, 2010 | 13-15 |
| Volume 6 | May 26, 2010 | 16-19 |
| Volume 7 | June 23, 2010 | 20-22 |
| Volume 8 | July 23, 2010 | 23-25 |

Japanese season 2 DVD releases
| Volume | Date | Episodes |
|---|---|---|
| Volume 1 | March 2, 2011 | 1-3 |
| Volume 2 | April 20, 2011 | 4-6 |
| Volume 3 | May 11, 2011 | 7-9 |
| Volume 4 | June 8, 2011 | 10-12 |
