= Overdose (Natori song) =

2022 single by Natori

- Cover artwork by 87dpi

Single by Natori

from the album Theater
- Language: Japanese; English
- Released: September 7, 2022
- Genre: J-pop
- Length: 3:17
- Label: Siritoriyowai Records
- Songwriter: Natori
- Producer: Natori

Natori singles chronology
"Overdose" (2022)	"Sarushibai" (2023)

Music video
- "Overdose" on YouTube

"Overdose" is the debut single by Japanese singer-songwriter Natori. It was released on September 7, 2022, as a digital single under the imprint label Siritoriyowai Records. It became his breakout hit, amassing over 300 million streams on Spotify as of 2026. It was later included on his debut studio album Theater.

== Background and release ==
In an interview alongside Japanese singer-songwriter Imase, Natori revealed he was gifted a higher-quality microphone by Imase as a birthday present. It was then used to record the TikTok demos that soon went viral.

On May 14, 2022, "Overdose" was posted as a demo to TikTok where it gained considerable attention, resulting in over 280,000 videos using the song. The success led the song to debut at number five on Billboard Japan's TikTok Weekly Top 20 chart, peaking at number two.

On September 7, 2022, "Overdose" was released to YouTube and digital streaming services. It went on to be covered by numerous artists, including Ado, Hoshimachi Suisei, and Kobo Kanaeru.

On April 28, 2023, an acoustic version of the song was released.

"Overdose" was released under the imprint label Siritoriyowai Records, which is also Natori's online handle. The name originated from a TikTok Live between Natori and Imase in June 2021, in which Natori lost a game of shiritori and as a penalty, changed his handle to "siritoriyowai", roughly translating to "bad at shiritori".

== Commercial performance ==
"Overdose" debuted on Billboard Japan's Streaming Songs chart at number 17, where it maintained a top 10 position for 12 consecutive weeks, reaching a peak position of number two. It went on to surpass 200 million streams on its 30th week, and 300 million on its 58th. The song tied for the sixth-fastest song to reach 100 million streams on that chart, doing so in its 13th week.

On Oricon's Weekly Streaming Ranking, the song surpassed 100 million streams in 14 weeks, tying with Yuuri's "Dried Flower" for the second-fastest time to reach 100 million streams achieved by a male artist. Additionally, "Overdose" briefly overtook Ado's "New Genesis" as the number one song of Oricon's Daily Digital Singles chart, and on Billboard Japan's Top User Generated Songs chart. The song also peaked at number one and two on Line Music and Apple Music's charts respectively, and was certified 3× Platinum by the RIAJ.

== Charts ==
=== Weekly charts ===
Chart (2022-2024)	Peak position
Global 200 (Billboard)	140
Japan (Japan Hot 100)	4

=== Year-end charts ===
Chart (2022)	Position
Japan Hot 100 (Billboard)	75

Chart (2023)	Position
Japan Hot 100 (Billboard)	9

Chart (2024)	Position
Japan Hot 100 (Billboard)	84

== Certifications ==
Region	Certification	Certified units/sales
Streaming
Japan (RIAJ)	3× Platinum	300,000,000^{†}
^{†} Streaming-only figures based on certification alone.
