= Effective dose =

Effective dose or internal dose may refer to:

- Effective dose (pharmacology), a dose or concentration of a drug that produces a biological response
- Effective dose (radiation), a measure of the stochastic effect on health risk that a radiation dose internal or external to whole or part of the body will have
- In toxicology, the internal dose measured through biomonitoring

== See also ==
- Dose (disambiguation)
