= The Abyss (album) =

Studio album by natori
- Released: January 21, 2026
- Recorded: 2024–2026
- Genres: J-pop; rock
- Length: 55:45
- Language: Japanese
- Label: Sony Music Labels
- Producer: natori

Natori chronology
| Theater (2023) | The Abyss (2026) |

The Abyss (深海, Shinkai) is the second studio album by Japanese singer natori, released on January 21, 2026, via Sony Music Labels. It is his second album release since Theater (劇場, Gekijō) in 2023.

Announced on November 25, 2025, it was preceded by the release of nine singles, most notably "Serenade", which was used as the ending theme for the third season of anime series Oshi no Ko, and "Absolute Zero", which was used as the opening theme for the first season of anime series Wind Breaker.

The album has been considered to have a more frenetic and abrasive sound.

== Background ==
The album was announced on November 25, 2025, via a YouTube livestream, where he revealed the album's contents and the release date. Pre-orders for the physical copies were opened the same day.

In an interview with Sayako Oki, after the end of his second solo concert, "Theater - Reprise", natori stated that "Chapter 1" of his career had ended. He expressed a desire to take a positive step forward in his music, as Theater reflected his adolescent struggles, although it proved difficult as it conflicted with his genuine passion to make pop.

In a separate interview with Yukako Yajima, natori expressed his desire to make the album 18 tracks long to outdo Theater's 13 tracks as previously he believed the tracklist should be fixed. He also stated he wanted to evoke the excitement of seeing unfamiliar tracks on a new album as Theater was composed mostly of already released singles.

== Release ==
The Abyss was released on streaming platforms and in limited edition CD copies containing extra artwork and anecdotes, via natori's personal store and Japanese CD retailers. In addition, store-specific bonuses were included along with purchase.

Following the release of the album, natori performed his third solo concert to promote the album at Nippon Budokan.

== Tracklist ==
All tracks are written by natori.

| No. | Title | Length |
|---|---|---|
| 1. | "The Abyss (深海)" | 1:30 |
| 2. | "HelpMeTakeMe (ヘルプミーテイクミー)" | 2:44 |
| 3. | "Serenade (セレナーデ)" | 3:39 |
| 4. | "What Is Ahead Of The Tunnel? (にわかには信じがたいものです)" | 2:33 |
| 5. | "Dressing Room" | 2:53 |
| 6. | "Eat" | 3:45 |
| 7. | "Flash Back" | 3:05 |
| 8. | "Propose (プロポーズ)" | 3:00 |
| 9. | "Just Between Us (恋する季節)" | 4:19 |
| 10. | "No Emergency Door (非常口 逃げてみた)" | 3:04 |
| 11. | "Infection (君と電波塔の交信)" | 2:23 |
| 12. | "In_My_Head" | 3:27 |
| 13. | "Absolute Zero (絶対零度)" | 3:19 |
| 14. | "Speed" | 2:03 |
| 15. | "Nostalgia (帰りの会)" | 3:48 |
| 16. | "Threads That Connect Us (糸電話)" | 3:44 |
| 17. | "Birthday Song (バースデイ・ソング)" | 4:10 |
| 18. | "The Abyss-ed (うみのそこでまってる)" | 1:49 |
| Total length: | | 55:45 |

== Notes ==
- "ヘルプミーテイクミー" ("HelpMeTakeMe") and "非常口 逃げてみた" ("No Emergency Door"), when presented in English, are stylized in uppercase.
- "Dressing Room", "Eat", "Flash Back", "In_My_Head", and "Speed", named in English, are stylized in uppercase.

== Personnel ==
All tracks are written, composed, programmed, and sung by natori

Credits sourced from Spotify.

=== "The Abyss" (深海) ===
- Leon Nishizuki - programming
- Tsubasa Yamazaki - mastering
- Yu Sasaki - mastering and programming

=== "HelpMeTakeMe" (ヘルプミーテイクミー) ===
- Leon Nishizuki - bass
- Taku Inoue - electric guitar
- Tsubasa Yamazaki - mastering
- Yu Sasaki - mixing and programming

=== "Serenade" (セレナーデ) ===
- Masashi Uramoto - mixing
- Tsumiki - arranging, programming, and guitar
- Yu Sasaki - recording

=== "What Is Ahead Of The Tunnel?" (にわかには信じがたいものです) ===
- Leon Nishizuki - bass
- Taku Inoue - electric guitar
- Masashi Uramoto - mixing

=== "Dressing Room" ===
- Shin Sakiura - arranging
- Shintaro Sato - mixing and mastering

=== "Eat" ===
- Leon Nishizuki - bass
- Motohiro Noguchi - recording
- Norikatsu Teruuchi - mixing and recording
- Ryo Kanda - drums
- Tetsu Sanada - guitar
- Tsubasa Yamazaki - mastering

=== "Flash Back" ===
- Atari Miyakawa - piano
- George Hayashi - saxophone
- Mariko Mihara - trombone
- Motohiro Noguchi - recording
- Ryo Kanda - drums
- TAIKING - guitar
- Taku Inoue - scratches
- Tsubasa Yamazaki - mastering
- Yochi Masago - trumpet
- Yu Sasaki - mixing

=== "Propose" (プロポーズ) ===
- Atari Miyakawa - piano
- Leon Nishizuki - bass
- Masashi Uramoto - mixing

=== "Just Between Us" (恋する季節) ===
- Atari Miyakawa - piano
- Leon Nishizuki - bass
- Masashi Uramoto - mixing and recording
- Mitsuyasu Shimozuru - guitar
- Ryo Kanda - drums
- Tsubasa Yamazaki - mastering

=== "No Emergency Door" (非常口 逃げてみた) ===
- Defoko - backing vocals
- Matt Colton - mastering
- Yu Sasaki - mixing

=== "Infection" (君と電波塔の交信) ===
- Leon Nishizuki - bass
- Tsubasa Yamazaki - mastering
- Yu Sasaki - mastering and programming

=== "In_My_Head" ===
- Jo Sato - drums
- Leon Nishizuki - bass
- Motohiro Noguchi - recording
- Musashi Maruyama - recording
- Norikatsu Teruuchi - mixing
- Norio Terauchi - mixing

=== "Absolute Zero" (絶対零度) ===
- Jin - arranging and guitar
- Leon Nishizuki - bass
- MEG - mixing
- Yu Sasaki - recording
- Yumao Hayashi - drums

=== "Speed" ===
- Leon Nishizuki - bass and programming
- Yu Sasaki - mixing

=== "Nostalgia" (帰りの会) ===
- Leon Nishizuki - bass
- Masashi Uramoto - mixing
- Motohiro Noguchi - recording
- Ryo Kanda - drums
- Tetsu Sanada - guitar
- Tsubasa Yamazaki - mastering

=== "Threads That Connect Us" (糸電話) ===
- Daisuke Kadowaki - strings
- Kazuma Nagasawa - arranging
- Koichi Tsutaya - arranging and producing
- Leon Nishizuki - bass
- Norikatsu Teruuchi - mixing
- Ryo Kanda - drums

=== "Birthday Song" (バースデイ・ソング) ===
- Jo Sato - drums
- Leon Nishizuki - bass
- Motohiro Noguchi - recording
- Tetsu Sanada - guitar
- Tsubasa Yamazaki - mastering
- Yu Sasaki - mixing

=== "The Abyss-ed" (うみのそこでまってる) ===
- Tetsu Sanada - guitar
- Tsubasa Yamazaki - arranging
- Yu Sasaki - mixing and programming

=== Additional credits ===
- Minahamu - artwork

==== Liner notes ====
- Natori - "The Abyss" (深海)
- Enon Kawatani - "HelpMeTakeMe" (ヘルプミーテイクミー)
- Meychan - "Serenade" (セレナーデ)
- Iyowa - "What Is Ahead Of The Tunnel?" (にわかには信じがたいものです)
- Mega Shinnosuke - "Dressing Room"
- TAIKING - "Eat"
- WurtS - "Flash Back"
- Haruno - "Propose" (プロポーズ)
- Hokimoto Sora - "Just Between Us" (恋する季節)
- Avaraya - "No Emergency Door" (非常口 逃げてみた)
- Eve - "Infection" (君と電波塔の交信)
- Deu - "In_My_Head"
- Jin - "Absolute Zero" (絶対零度)
- Takachi - "Speed"
- Jo0ji - "Nostalgia" (帰りの会)
- Mizuki Tsujimura - "Threads That Connect Us" (糸電話)
- Daisuke Matsumoto - "Birthday Song" (バースデイ・ソング)
- Minahamu - "The Abyss-ed" (うみのそこでまってる)

== Charts ==
| Chart (2026) | Peak position |
|---|---|
| Japanese Albums (Oricon) | 19 |
| Japanese Combined Albums (Oricon) | 13 |
| Japanese Hot Albums (Billboard Japan) | 4 |
