= Minahamu =

Japanese illustrator

- Born: 1995 (aged 31); Tokyo, Japan
- Education: Musashino Art University
- Style: Nihonga

Minahamu (みなはむ; born 1995), also referred to as Minaham or Manuhamu is a Japanese illustrator, painter, and picture book author from Tokyo, Japan. She is best known for her work with the Pokémon Trading Card Game and J-pop musician Natori. Additionally, she has worked with Kadokawa.

== Background ==
Minahamu was born in Tokyo, Japan, in 1995. Her public illustrations date as early as 2009 on Pixiv. She has stated her illustrative influences are Arina Tanemura, Hiroyuki Etō, and Jun Kumaori, though colour-wise belongs to Edward Hopper and Henri Matisse.

She attended Musashino Art University, which around the same time, she started publishing doujinshi through COMITIA. In 2017, she held her first many of annual solo exhibitions in her fourth year of attendance. She proceeded to graduate from the Department of Japanese Painting in January 2018.

== Contributions ==
Client	Work	Role	Year	Note	Ref
Nao Mizusawa	"It's a Beautiful Body"	Cover Illustrator	2019		
Shichosha	"Contemporary Poetry Notebook (Gendai Shi Techo)"	Cover Illustrator	2020	June 2020 issue	
The Asahi Shimbun	"Watashi no Egaku Gutto Mūbī" (私の描くグッとムービー)	Illustrator and Interviewee	2020		
Ritsuto Igarashi	"Irreversible Boy" (不可逆少年)	Cover Illustrator	2020		
Kuretake	"Inktober"	Collaborative Illustrator	2020	Inktober 2020	
Ariake Honda	"Somewhere Far Away, Not Here"	Illustrator	2021	Cover and in-book illustrator	
Kuretake	"Kanbiou"	Promotional Illustrator	2021		
Keiko Arai	"Tonari no Shoumen" (となり の 正面)	Cover Illustrator	2021		
Mili	"Bulbel"	Illustrator	2021	Used in the video game Ender Lilies: Quietus of the Knights	
Mili	"Hearts Stay Unchanged"	Illustrator	2021	Used in the video game Ender Lilies: Quietus of the Knights	
Cobalt Boy	"Sanso"	Album and Tee illustrator	2021		
Moonscape	"Ghost Town Revisited"	Cover Illustrator	2021	Published in Thailand	
Koubo Guide / Reon Kudo	"Picture to Tanka Vol. 02"	Cover Illustrator	2022		
Nao Mizusawa	"Sea"	Cover Illustrator	2022		
Kuretake	"Quarterly S" (季刊エス)	Illustrator	2022	Vol. 79 Autumn 2022 issue 120th Anniversary commemorative	
Orangestar / IA	"Shirohae" ((白南風))	Illustrator	2023		
Tokyo Shoseki	"Aoi Spin"	Cover Illustrator	2023	Spring 2023 issue	
Natori	"Osmanthus" (金木犀)	Lead Illustrator	2023	Illustrator for both single cover and MV	
Natori	"Thread That Connects Us" (糸電話)	Lead Illustrator	2024	Illustrator for both single cover and MV	
Tota	"Aruku" (あるく)	Cover Illustrator	2024	Used in the video game Open Space: Over Field	
The Pokémon Company	Pokémon Trading Card Game	Card Illustrator	2024-present	12 cards for the Surging Sparks expansion 3 for TCG Pocket	
Japan Association of Children's Literature Writers	"Japanese Children's Literature" (日本児童文学)	Cover Illustrator	2025	Cover Illustrator for six bi-monthly issues spanning for the entirety of 2025	
Sato Kawakami	"Leaping in the City" (街に躍ねる)	Cover Illustrator	2025		
Cobalt Boy	"Fight!"	Cover Illustrator	2025		
Arata Tendo	"Showa Detective Story" (昭和探偵物語)	Cover Illustrator	2025	Cover Illustrator for 10 installments	
Oisicle Melonpan	"Gunjō Tōhikou" (群青逃避行)	Cover Illustrator	2025		
Natori	"The Abyss" (深海)	Illustrator Liner notes	2026	Cover artwork and artwork for all 18 booklets	
Kadokawa	"Livly Island ART WORKS"	Collaborative Illustrator	2026		

Features
Presenter	Title	Year	Ref
Pixiv	"VISIONS 2021 ILLUSTRATORS BOOK"	2020	
Saint Maison Gallery	"ARCHIVE 01 JAPAN EDITION"	2020	

== Exhibitions ==
Solo exhibitions
Title	Date(s)	Venue	Ref
"Also, Cute" (それと、かわいい)	September 19–September 23, 2015	Shiori-bi (3rd floor)	
"Southern Island"	July 2017	meee	
"Musashino Art University Graduation Exhibition"	January 18–21, 2018	Musashino Art University	
"41st Tokyo Five Art Universities Joint Graduation and Completion Works Exhibition"	February 22–March 4, 2018	The National Art Center, Tokyo (New Art Museum)	
"Minahamu"	August 31–September 9, 2018	Genron Chaos*Lounge Gotanda Atelier	
"Michikusa"	October 2019	Taco Che	
"Wind and Destination"	May 1–June 1, 2020	Mangasick	
"It Was Summer" (夏でした)	September/October 2020	FOLK old book	
"Promise" (約束)	October 1–October 14, 2021	colifer102	
"Spring Stars" (春の星)	March 2022	ACG_Labo	
"Scattered Crayfish" (ザリガニ散る)	May 20–June 2, 2022	Kusamura BOOKS Shin-Moriyama	
"Summer's Exit"	October 1–October 14, 2022	Ginza Tsutaya Bookstore	
"Winter's Entrance"	October 15–October 31, 2022	Ginza Tsutaya Bookstore	
"Vues en mémoire" (Scenes in Memories)	January 25–January 29	Gallery Jo Yana	
"Sea of the Heart" (心海)	June 2–June 3, 2023	Mangasick	
"Minaham Art Book Release Commemorative Exhibition 'In the Wind'" (みなはむ画集発売記念展『風の中)	September 2–24, 2023	space caiman	
"Shuttle" (シャトル)	March 16–March 31, 2024	FOLK old book store	
"Life in a Botanical Garden" (植物館のある生活)	June 17–July 6, 2025	Yumenoshima Tropical Botanical Garden (Yumenetsu)	
"Grass Entangled Wheels" (草のからまった車輪)	August 8–September 1, 2025	Mangasick	

== Written works ==
Title	Release date	Publisher	Ref
"Sound Outside Illustration" (画外音)	March 2022	Mori Yuman	
"Ghosts at Night" (よるにおばけと)	October 21, 2022	Mishimasha. Co.	
"In the Wind: The Art of minahamu"	September 14, 2023	PIE International	
"Spring is something" (はるってなんか)	March 20, 2025	Mishamasha Co.	
