= Ghost Concert =

Japanese mixed media project

- Key visual of the anime series
- Genre: Music; Science fiction
- Created by: Noriyasu Agematsu; Elements Garden; Unison; Project MiucS; Aria Entertainment; Kadokawa
- Anime television series

Ghost Concert: Missing Songs
- Directed by: Masato Jinbo
- Written by: Masato Jinbo
- Music by: Junpei Fujita; Seima Kondō; Daisuke Horikawa
- Studio: ENGI
- Licensed by: Crunchyroll: SEA: Medialink
- Original network: Tokyo MX, BS Asahi, Kansai TV, CBC, UHB, TNC, TSB, AT-X, Wowow
- Original run: April 6, 2026 – June 22, 2026
- Episodes: 12

Ghost Concert is a Japanese music-themed mixed-media project featuring "song battles" created by Noriyasu Agematsu, Elements Garden and Aria Entertainment that began in 2017 and includes music releases, live events, and merchandise. An anime television series produced by ENGI, titled Ghost Concert: Missing Songs, premiered in April 2026.

== Characters ==
Seria Aiba (相葉芹亜, Aiba Seria)
Voiced by: Minori Fujidera
Cleopatra (クレオパトラ, Kureopatora)
Voiced by: Rina Hidaka
Kaede Saionji (西園寺楓, Saionji Kaede)
Voiced by: Nao Ojika
Akari Murayama (村山朱莉, Murayama Akari)
Voiced by: Miyuki Sakurai
Rui Ichikawa (市川瑠衣, Ichikawa Rui)
Voiced by: Yuri An
Riku Aoki (青木凛空, Aoki Riku)
Voiced by: Satomi Satō
Setsutei (雪庭)
Voiced by: Satoshi Hino
Yōtetsu (葉哲)
Voiced by: Miyu Irino
MiucS (ミウクス, Miukusu)
Voiced by: Emiri Suyama
Odysseus (オデッセウス, Odesseusu)
Voiced by: Minako Kotobuki

== Other media ==
=== Anime ===
An anime television series was announced on October 24, 2025. Titled Ghost Concert: Missing Songs, the series is produced by ENGI and directed and written by Masato Jinbo, with Masaaki Uikawa designing the characters and Junpei Fujita, Seima Kondō, and Daisuke Horikawa from Elements Garden composing the music at Elements Garden and Heart Company. was aired from April 6 to June 22, 2026, on Tokyo MX and other networks. The opening theme song is "Gokkon Requiemer", performed by Minori Fujidera as her character Seria Aiba, and the ending theme song is "Ibara no Michi", performed by Minako Kotobuki as her character Odysseus. Crunchyroll is streaming the series. Medialink licensed the series for streaming on Ani-One Asia's YouTube channel.

==== Episodes ====
No.	Title	Directed by (Note: Production staff information is taken from the ending credits of each episode.)	Written by	Storyboarded by	Original release date
1	"Heartbreaking Goodbye"; Transliteration: "Seiri Shibetsu (Zenpen)" (Japanese: 生離死別(せいりしべつ) [前編])	Masato Jinbo	Masato Jinbo	Masato Jinbo	April 6, 2026
2	"Separation of Life and Death (Part 2)"; Transliteration: "Seiri Shibetsu (Kouhen)" (Japanese: 生離死別(せいりしべつ) [後編])	Masato Jinbo	Masato Jinbo	Masato Jinbo	April 13, 2026
3	"Blades and Thorns"; Transliteration: "Kenzantōju" (Japanese: 剣山刀樹(けんざんとうじゅ))	Masato Jinbo & Takahiro Hirata	Masato Jinbo	Masato Jinbo & Takahiro Hirata	April 20, 2026
4	"Worlds Apart"; Transliteration: "Shisekitengai" (Japanese: 咫尺天涯(しせきてんがい))	Masato Jinbo & Takahiro Hirata	Masato Jinbo	Masato Jinbo & Takahiro Hirata	April 27, 2026
5	"Unfading Resolve"; Transliteration: "Toukaseisei" (Japanese: 冬夏青青(とうかせいせい))	Masato Jinbo	Masato Jinbo	Motohiro Abe	May 4, 2026
6	"Ashes of Atonement"; Transliteration: "Shishindontan" (Japanese: 漆身呑炭(しっしんどんたん))	Masato Jinbo	Masato Jinbo	Masato Jinbo	May 11, 2026
7	"Strength and Mercy"; Transliteration: "Yokukyōfujaku" (Japanese: 抑強扶弱(よくきょうふじゃく))	Masato Jinbo	Masato Jinbo	Motohiro Abe	May 18, 2026
8	"Lost Among Paths"; Transliteration: "Taki Bōyō" (Japanese: 多岐亡羊(たきぼうよう))	Masato Jinbo & Ai Sakamoto	Masato Jinbo	Yuri Isowa	May 25, 2026
9	"Master Thyself / Rule Through Discipline"; Transliteration: "Shūko Chijin" (Japanese: 修己治人(しゅうこちじん))	Masato Jinbo	Masato Jinbo	Takahiro Hirata	June 1, 2026
10	"Tempestuous Desire"; Transliteration: "Iba Shin'en" (Japanese: 意馬心猿(いばしんえん))	Masato Jinbo	Masato Jinbo	Masato Jinbo	June 8, 2026
11	Transliteration: "Rinmyō Shūji" (Japanese: 臨命終時(りんみょうしゅうじ))	Masato Jinbo	Masato Jinbo	Masato Jinbo	June 15, 2026
12	Transliteration: "Ōbaitōri" (Japanese: 桜梅桃李(おうばいとうり))	Masato Jinbo	Masato Jinbo	Kazuya Miura	June 22, 2026
