= Night Dancer =

Single by Imase

from the album Bonsai
- Language: Japanese
- Released: August 19, 2022
- Genre: J-pop
- Length: 3:30
- Label: Virgin Music
- Songwriter: Imase
- Producers: Imase; Esme Mori

Imase singles chronology
"Demone, Tamaniwa" (2022)	"Night Dancer" (2022)	"Utau" (2022)

Music video
- "Night Dancer" on YouTube

"Night Dancer" (stylized in all caps) is a song by Japanese singer-songwriter Imase. It was released as a digital single on August 19, 2022 through Virgin Music, a subsidiary of Universal Music Japan. It was first included in his EP Pop Cube, and later added to the track list of his debut album Bonsai. It is considered his breakout hit both in Japan and worldwide. It also gained further mainstream attention after being featured as the ending theme to the Abema broadcast of Smoking Behind the Supermarket with You.

== Background and release ==
Initially having no musical background, Imase self-learned how to write and compose music starting in November 2020, eventually posting himself playing music on TikTok before releasing his major debut single "Have a Nice Day" in December 2021. In August 2022, Imase released "Night Dancer", quickly becoming a hit on TikTok in Japan.

In early 2023, "Night Dancer" peaked at number 17 on the South Korean Melon top 100 chart, making history as the first ever J-pop song to chart there.

== Composition and lyrics ==
"Night Dancer" is a J-pop song, composed in the key of G minor and is set in time signature of common time with a tempo of 117 BPM. It was written by Imase and produced by him and Esme Mori.

Imase created the melody for "Night Dancer" while driving at night, and wrote the song with the intention of exciting listeners during an active night. He also took inspiration from the chord progression of "Just the Two of Us" by Grover Washington Jr. featuring Bill Withers.

== Music video ==
The music video for "Night Dancer" was released on August 30, 2022 and directed by Mess. It depicts Imase and Japanese house dancer Miyu in nighttime Tokyo walking on the street, sitting in the back of a taxi, on the rooftop of a building, and on the floor of an apartment room each at different times, both wearing headphones and listening to the song. Towards the final chorus of the song, Miyu begins dancing. Upon release of the video, Mess commented:

"The city at night seemed to sparkle more than usual, and the people walking the streets seemed to be in high spirits. Each light in each building has a person living there, each with their own story... I was thinking about these things while listening to "Night Dancer" and gazing at the city, and that's how this music video came about. Please enjoy the depth of the song, which can only be appreciated in its full length, along with the visuals!"

— Mess, Billboard Japan

== Credits and personnel ==
Credits adapted from Apple Music.

- Imase – vocals, songwriter, producer
- Esme Mori – arranger, producer
- Masahito Komori – mixing engineer

== Charts ==
=== Weekly charts ===
Weekly chart performance for "Night Dancer"
Chart (2023)	Peak position
Global 200 (Billboard)	112
Japan (Japan Hot 100)	38
South Korea (Circle)	14
Singapore Regional (RIAS)	28

=== Year-end charts ===
Year-end chart performance for "Night Dancer"
Chart (2023)	Position
Japan (Japan Hot 100)	97
South Korea (Circle)	45

== Certifications and sales ==
Certifications and sales for "Night Dancer"
Region	Certification	Certified units/sales
Japan (RIAJ)	Platinum	100,000,000^{†}
^{†} Streaming-only figures based on certification alone.
