= Dose =

Dose or Dosage may refer to:

== Music ==
=== Albums ===
- Dose (Gov't Mule album), 1998
- Dose (Latin Playboys album), 1999
- Dosage (album), by Collective Soul, 1999

=== Songs ===
- "Dose" (song), 2018, by Ciara
- "Dose", by Filter from Short Bus, 1995
- "Dose", by Khalid from Sincere, 2024
- "Dose", by Primer 55 from Introduction to Mayhem, 2000
- "Dose", by Teddy Swims from Sleep Is Exhausting, 2022
- "Dosage", by Liz Phair from Soberish, 2021

== Science ==
- Dose (biochemistry), a measured quantity of a medicine, nutrient, or pathogen which is delivered as a unit.
- Dosage (pharmacology), prescribed regimen of medication administration, including amount, frequency, and duration
- Dosage form, a mixture of active and inactive components used to administer a medication
- Dosing, feeding chemicals or medicines when used in small quantities
- Effective dose (pharmacology), a dose or concentration of a drug that produces a biological response
- Absorbed dose, a measure of energy deposited in matter from ionizing radiation
- Equivalent dose, a measure of cancer/heritable health risk in tissue from ionizing radiation
- Effective dose (radiation), a measure of cancer/heritable health risk to the whole body from ionizing radiation
- Median lethal dose, a measure of the lethal dose of a chemical agent, toxin, radiation, or pathogen
- DOSE, an acronym for dopamine, oxytocin, serotonin, and endorphins, the four main chemicals associated with happiness in humans

== Other ==
- Dosa or dose, a thin pancake or crepe originating from South India
- Dose (magazine), a free daily Canadian magazine
- Döse, town in Lower Saxony, Germany
- Gerd Dose (1942–2010), professor of English literature at the University of Hamburg

== See also ==
- Double Dose (disambiguation)
- Effective dose (disambiguation)
- Overdose (disambiguation)
