= Shinsei Mokuroku =

Studio album by Hoshimachi Suisei
- Released: January 22, 2025
- Genre: J-pop
- Length: 38:29
- Label: Cover Corp.
- Producers: Deu; Enon Kawatani; Giga; Haruno; Shota Horie; Taku Inoue; Kanaria; Natori; Yoko Shimomura; Hoshimachi Suisei; Ryo Takahashi; TeddyLoid; Tsumiki; Soichiro Yamauchi

Hoshimachi Suisei chronology
Specter (2023)	Shinsei Mokuroku (2025)

Singles from Shinsei Mokuroku
- 1. "Xion" Released: November 7, 2023; 2. "Bibbidiba" Released: March 23, 2024; 3. "Moonlight" Released: October 1, 2024; 4. "Awake" Released: November 15, 2024

Shinsei Mokuroku (新星目録, Shinsei Mokuroku; lit. "Nova Catalog"; stylized in uppercase) is the third studio album by Japanese singer and virtual YouTuber Hoshimachi Suisei, released by Cover Corp. on January 22, 2025. The album was preceded by the single "Bibbidiba", which became Hoshimachi's most successful song, as well as "Xion", "Moonlight", and "Awake"; the songs "Pathfinder" and "Requiem", originally released as a collaboration with Kanaria, were also included despite not being part of the album's rollout. Featuring a sole guest appearance from fellow VTuber KAF, as well as production from TeddyLoid, Enon Kawatani, Natori, and Ryo Takahashi, the album centers around themes of revolution. The album art was illustrated by Mika Picazo.

Shinsei Mokuroku is Hoshimachi's highest charting album to date, debuting at number three on the standard Oricon charts and number two on its combined albums chart. Following its release, she promoted it with music videos for album tracks "Venus Bug", "Caramel Pain", and "Kireigoto", and performed a concert at the Nippon Budokan.

== Background ==
On January 25, 2023, Hoshimachi released her second studio album Specter, her most successful album at that point, charting at number four on the Oricon and Billboard charts. Three days later on January 28, during her promotional "Shout in Crisis" concert at the Tokyo Garden Theater, she premiered and subsequently released the song "Pathfinder", which would later be included on Shinsei Mokuroku as its opening track. She would follow it up by releasing the denpa song "Sui-chan's Maintenance Song" on April 1, following an April Fools' Day stream, as well as featuring on producer Kanaria's song "Requiem" two weeks later; while the former was cut from the album, the latter was included as a solo version.

On October 27, 2023, Hoshimachi was announced as an ambassador for the Japanese game Aster Tatariqus, and subsequently released the song "Xion" on November 7, written by Hoshimachi herself alongside Yoko Shimomura, additionally serving as Shinsei Mokuroku's lead single.

== Track listing ==
Shinsei Mokuroku track listing
No.	Title	Lyrics	Music	Arrangement	Length
1.	"Pathfinder" (先駆者 "Senkūsha")	Soichiro Yamauchi	Yamauchi	Yamauchi	4:36
2.	"Bibbidiba" (ビビデバ "Bibideba")	Tsumiki	Tsumiki	Tsumiki	2:44
3.	"Awake"	Kayoko Kusano	Giga; TeddyLoid	Giga; TeddyLoid	3:17
4.	"Venus Bug" (ビーナスバグ "Bīnasu Bagu")	Enon Kawatani	Kawatani	Kawatani	2:49
5.	"Caramel Pain"	Deu	Deu	Deu; Hajime Taguchi	2:59
6.	"Moonlight" (ムーンライト "Mūnraito")	Natori	Natori	Natori	3:00
7.	"Deadpool" (featuring KAF)	Haruno	Haruno	Haruno	3:24
8.	"Requiem" (レクイエム "Rekuiemu" - Hoshimachi Suisei version)	Kanaria	Kanaria	Kanaria	2:38
9.	"Xion" (ザイオン "Zaion")	Hoshimachi Suisei	Yoko Shimomura	Shota Horie	4:12
10.	"Cocoon and Heart" (繭と心 "Mayu to Kokoro")	Erica Masaki	Ryo Takahashi	Takahashi	4:58
11.	"Kireigoto" (綺麗事)	Hoshimachi	Hoshimachi	Taku Inoue	3:46
Total length:					38:29

Notes

- "Awake" and "Deadpool" are stylized in uppercase, as are "Bibbidiba" and "Xion" on English-language streaming platforms.
- "Cocoon and Heart" is stylized in lowercase on English-language streaming platforms.
- "Requiem" is written as "Rekuiemu" on English-language streaming platforms.

== Charts ==
=== Weekly charts ===
Weekly chart performance for Shinsei Mokuroku
Chart (2025)	Peak position
Japanese Albums (Oricon)	3
Japanese Combined Albums (Oricon)	2
Japanese Hot Albums (Billboard Japan)	12

=== Monthly charts ===
Monthly chart performance for Shinsei Mokuroku
Chart (2025)	Position
Japanese Albums (Oricon)	7

=== Year-end charts ===
Year-end chart performance for Shinsei Mokuroku
Chart (2025)	Position
Japanese Albums (Oricon)	96
Japanese Download Albums (Billboard Japan)	15
