= Double Dose =

Double Dose is a common expression generally meaning double that of the typical amount. It may also refer to:

- Double Dose (Hot Tuna album), 1978
- Double Dose (Tela album), 2002
- Double Dose: Ultimate Hits, a 2011 album by Poison
- "Double Dose" (Superman: The Animated Series), a 1997 episode

== See also ==
- A Double Dose, a 2004 album by Great White
- Dose (disambiguation)
