= Bibbidiba =

2024 song by Hoshimachi Suisei

Single by Hoshimachi Suisei

from the album Shinsei Mokuroku
- Language: Japanese
- Released: March 23, 2024
- Genre: J-pop; electro-funk; mutant disco
- Length: 2:45
- Label: Cover Corp
- Composer: Tsumiki
- Lyricist: Tsumiki

Hoshimachi Suisei singles chronology
"Kyoushitsu ni Ao" (2024)	"Bibbidiba" (2024)

Music video
- "Bibbidiba" on YouTube

"Bibbidiba" (ビビデバ, Bibideba; stylized in uppercase on English-language platforms) is a 2024 song by Hoshimachi Suisei, a VTuber affiliated with Hololive Production. Written entirely by Vocaloid producer Tsumiki for Hoshimachi's Sheenderella Day livestream with her idea of a "Reiwa Cinderella" aura in mind, it is a disco song about Hoshimachi's desire for freedom from a boring life. A mockumentary music video combining live-action scenes with animation, where Shigeo Osako plays a director whom Hoshimachi is fed up with for forcing her to wear high heels for a dance number, was directed by experimental art duo MimicryMeta.

"Bibbidiba" was praised for its themes on freedom and anti-discrimination, as well as the music video's confrontation between the director and Hoshimachi, and it drew comparisons to the eponymous folk tale depicting Cinderella, especially with Hoshimachi's free-willed nature. It charted in the top 25 of several Oricon and Billboard Japan charts, including #5 on the Billboard Japan Download Songs chart, as well as in the top ten of the Billboard Japan Singapore, South Korea, and Thailand charts. Additionally, its popularity remained throughout the rest of the year, charting in the Billboard Japan 2024 Hot 100 chart and being common-place in 2024's annual music playlists. Its music video rose to popularity in social media, especially the dance at the ending, and it became the fastest VTuber music video to reach ten million views and 100 million views that year.

== Background and release ==
The lyrics, composition, and arrangement were handled by Vocaloid producer Tsumiki. Hoshimachi approached Tsumiki to write a song for her sixth-anniversary livestream, Sheenderella Day, having previously covered the latter's 2021 song "Phony"; her song was written with the livestream's clock and neon motifs in mind, as well as her own idea of a "Reiwa Cinderella" aura. In the song, Hoshimachi talks about being stuck in a boring life, before expressing a desire to think for herself. Jin Sugiyama of Real Sound said that "Bibbidiba" was more oriented towards futuristic mutant disco than "Phony", and that its melody is a mixture of singing and rapping, while praising Hoshimachi's ability to sing music he felt was difficult.

"Bibbidiba" made its debut at the Sheenderella Day concert on March 22, 2024. It received a CD single release on August 7, 2024, including a remix by American record producer BloodPop. Additionally, a limited-edition deluxe edition featuring an acrylic stand and a card depicting one of the music video's scenes was released on the same day. Hoshimachi also held a collaboration with the city of Sagamihara, with mayor Kentaro Motomura, the deputy mayor, and the team at the JAXA Sagamihara Campus, dancing to the song.

== Music video ==
A music video for the song was released on Hoshimachi's YouTube channel on March 22, 2024. Bivi and Nike Shimaguchi, who form the experimental art duo MimicryMeta and had collaborated with Tooboe and Zutomayo, directed the video. A mockumentary with no audible dialogue, Hoshimachi is depicted filming a Cinderella-inspired dance number at a production studio when she complains to the director about having to wear high heels during the number. After she trips over during filming, the director (played by Shigeo Osako) has an argument with one of the production staff when Hoshimachi voices her anger towards the former; this escalates violently after Hoshimachi throws her glass slipper at the director, causing production staff to restrain the two away from each other. Holding the camera, she changes into another set of clothes from a nearby hallway and walks outside, where she dances the Charleston with only her hands and face animated.

To choreograph the acting, MimicryMeta used previsualization and storyboarding, before filming at a park while, as Shimaguchi recalled, "the neighbors [were] walking their dogs". Although the music video looks like a one-shot film, with the camera rotating a full 180 degrees during the filming scene between the stage and the production staff, the filming process reportedly took thirty shots and 200 takes. MimicryMeta hired Osako to play the director based on his experience with Senritsu Kaiki World: Kowasugi!, another mockumentary.

The music video uses rotoscoping to combine live-action actors and animated characters, with Yu Numata comparing this to the golden age of American animation; Bivi said that they decided to use live-action animation in order to make the video look realistic and take advantage of the creative freedom it offers. Shimaguchi recalled that the backgrounds were the most difficult part of the animation, as well as watching Hoshimachi's videos as research for her facial expressions. Other observers compared it to Who Framed Roger Rabbit and Space Jam; however, despite having to bring the former up during production, Shimaguchi denied that the film directly influenced it. Bivi and Shimaguchi handled the live-action footage and backgrounds, respectively. Digital compositing was handled by Yasukura and Kuromaru, and Negibidama handled both production progress and Hoshimachi's animated parts for the final scene.

== Reception ==
MarSali of UtaTen praised the song for its message on freedom. Additionally, Numata considered the music video to have the same anti-discrimination message as Childish Gambino's "This Is America", making her in Numata's words "the Black music of the VTuber world". Numata interpreted the music video as a satire of the perceived "creepiness" of VTubers, particularly the uncanny valley effect and anti-VTuber sentiment from others not familiar with them; examples they cited included the use of mechanical camera movement, rotoscoping, and unnatural animation. Several news outlets compared the music video to Cinderella. Sugiyama noted that the Cinderella depicted in the video is more free-willed than the original one and that the ending is "like an inspiration to women who struggle every day in the rough seas of society, or to people of today", while Tamagomago of MoguraVR News called the video's portrayal of Hoshimachi as "Cinderella under a troublesome director".

Additionally, the Cinderella comparison extended to the song itself, with Sugiyama calling it a "modern Cinderella song" comparing Hoshimachi's image to her Western counterparts, as well as MarSali suggesting that the title was inspired by "Bibbidi-Bobbidi-Boo", a song performed in Disney's own Cinderella film, and that the last verse before the music video's fight escalates, "hai ni naru made odotte iyou" (灰に成る迄踊って居よう; lit. Let's dance until we turn to ashes), alludes to the fireplace ashes Cinderella sleeps in despite being about what MarSali calls "[Hoshimachi's] desire to act honestly until she is burned out and reduced to ash". Bivi said the active Cinderella aspect of the video was Hoshimachi's idea, and that some aspects symbolize the Cinderella theme, including the thrown glass slipper, which Shimaguchi said was "Reiwa-like".

Kai-You called the song proof that "VTubers' singing voices can make it to the heart of the music scene". Alice Lange of Martin Cid Magazine praised the song as an "irresistibly danceable rhythm that’s poised to take over dance floors from Tokyo to the rest of the world". Kazura Asada of Real Sound said that the music video was a "milestone that shows the strength of Hoshimachi Suisei as an artist and the maturity of VTuber culture". Satoshi Shinkai of Music Natalie found the fight between Hoshimachi and the director "comical and cute" and felt "captivated by the dance at the ending". Tamagomago praised the music video and said that the director "add[ed] spice to the film" and that they found Hoshimachi's outrage cathartic, but found the scene it was in was ambiguous. News outlets deemed the music video's use of live-action animation experimental, innovative. and novel, or unique. Numata commended the compositing and the intentional use of unnatural-looking animation to invoke the uncanny valley effect.

The music video reached ten million views on April 7 and 100 million views in November 2024, beating Shigure Ui's "Shukusei!! Loli Kami Requiem" as the fastest VTuber music video to reach either milestone. "Bibbidiba" reached #19 on the Billboard Japan Hot 100, the second Hoshimachi song to appear on that chair. It also topped at #14 at the Top Singles Sales chart, #5 on the Download Songs chart, and #24 at the Streaming Songs chart, and annually it reached #48 at the 2024 Hot 100 chart, #36 at the 2024 Download Songs chart, and #78 at the 2024 Streaming Songs chart. At the Oricon Singles Chart, the song reached #21 at the Combined Singles Chart, #5 at the Digital Singles Chart, and #15 at the Physical Singles Chart. Additionally, "Bibbidiba" was popular outside Japan; it appeared in some of Billboard Japan's overseas music charts, particularly the Singapore (#7), South Korea (#10), and Thailand charts (#5), as well as Global Japan Songs excl. Japan (#14). The music video's dance became popular in social media, including on TikTok, even among people unfamiliar with Hololive. One example was an instructional video from VTuber duo Omega Sisters, featured on MoguraVR News.

Some sources attributed this to the motion data for the ending dance being made public. Tamagomago said that another factor in the dance's popularity was the ability to use the dance to express individuality. Ryosuke Tsuzuki of Kai-You said that "Bibbidiba" was "synonymous with VTuber songs in 2024". The song was also common-place in playlists featuring the year's popular music, and it was featured on the Kai-You Top 10 VTuber Songs of 2024. Lange said that the song "cements [Hoshimachi's] status as a musical sensation to watch". Numata said that the music video "rewrote the history of VTuber music videos" as the agency's "most unique video" due to its deviation from the usual fare of commercial animation.

Bibbidiba won the 2024 MoguLive VTuber Award. In February 2025, the music video was recognized with a bronze award from the Clio Awards in the Clio Music 2025 program.

== Personnel ==
Credits adapted from Apple Music.

Musicians

- Hoshimachi Suisei – performer

Technical

- Tsumiki – lyrics, composer, arranger

== Charts ==
=== Weekly charts ===
Weekly chart performance for "Bibbidiba"
Chart (2024)	Peak position
Japan (Japan Hot 100)	19
Japan (Oricon)	15
Japan Combined Singles (Oricon)	21

=== Year-end charts ===
Year-end chart performance for "Bibbidiba"
Chart (2024)	Position
Japan (Japan Hot 100)	48

== Certifications ==
Certifications for "Bibbidiba"
Region	Certification	Certified units/sales
Streaming
Japan (RIAJ)	Platinum	100,000,000^{†}
^{†} Streaming-only figures based on certification alone.
