= Nao Ojika =

Japanese voice actress and singer

- 小鹿 なお
- Born: 9 August
- Occupations: Voice actress; singer
- Years active: 2021–present
- Employer: I'm Enterprise
- Notable work: Gakuen Idolmaster as Temari Tsukimura; Magical Sisters LuluttoLilly as Rui Nonoyama/Lulu Mashū; Ghost Concert: Missing Songs as Kaede Saionji

Nao Ojika (Japanese: 小鹿 なお, Hepburn: Ojika Nao; born 9 August) is a Japanese voice actress and singer from Nagoya, affiliated with I'm Enterprise. She has starred as Temari Tsukimura in Gakuen Idolmaster, Rui Nonoyama/Lulu Mashū in Magical Sisters LuluttoLilly, and Kaede Saionji in Ghost Concert: Missing Songs.

== Biography ==
Nao Ojika, a native of Nagoya, was born on 9 August. During her youth, she enjoyed reading textbooks for class, was interested in acting, and had aspirations of being a musician and narrator; this inspired her to become a voice actor. Although originally interested in evening anime song performers like Porno Graffitti, Scandal, Sid, and Spyair, she shifted towards rock bands with male vocals by high school, including 04 Limited Sazabys, The Oral Cigarettes, and Uverworld. She attended the Japan Narration Acting Institute Nagoya School for three years and passed the annual office affiliation examination. She joined I'm Enterprise on 1 April 2019.

In March 2024, it was announced Ojika would star as Temari Tsukimura, a major character of Gakuen Idolmaster, a spinoff of The Idolmaster franchise. Her Idolmaster singles, "Luna Say Maybe", "Ivy", and "Kanaetai, Kotabakari", charted respectively at #22, #25, and #18 at the Oricon Digital Singles Chart, as well as #27, #26, and #23 at the Billboard Japan Download Songs Chart.

In October 2025, Ojika was cast as Rui Nonoyama/Lulu Mashū, one of the two protagonists of Magical Sisters LuluttoLilly. She also starred as Kaede Saionji in Ghost Concert: Missing Songs. She released two digital photobooks, Nao kara and Aoi to Nao kara (alongside her Idolmaster co-star Aoi Nagatsuki), with Shueisha in February 2026. She also hosts Radio Dot Ai: Nao Ojika no Ojika no Oji-kan! on Chō! A&G+.

Ojika's special skill is dancing; she attended a dance club in high school and, as revealed in a 2024 LisAni! interview that she added it to her profile as a strength in a work that includes live performances. He holds a regular driver's license as a qualification, and her dialect is Nagoya dialect.

== Filmography ==
=== Television animation ===
Year	Title	Role	Ref.
2021	Blue Period	Woman	
2022	A Couple of Cuckoos	Amusement Park Guest	
2022	My Stepmom's Daughter Is My Ex	Yume's Friend	
2023	Insomniacs After School	Schoolgirl	
2023	My Love Story with Yamada-kun at Lv999	Tousei High School Student	
2023	Oshi no Ko	Clerk (Episode 22)	
2023	The Dangers in My Heart	Maimai	
2024	Blue Box	Eimei Sports Club Member	
2024	Villainess Level 99	Student	
2025	Magical Sisters LuluttoLilly	Rui Nonoyama/Lulu Mashū	
2026	Ghost Concert: Missing Songs	Kaede Saionji	
2026	A Hundred Scenes of Awajima	Nurse	
2026	Tamon's B-Side	Event Audience	
2027	Fall in Love, You False Angels	Otogi Katsura	
2027	No-Clipping My Way to Supremacy!	Auroia	

=== Video games ===
Year	Title	Role	Ref.
2022	Goddess of Victory: Nikke	Ein	
2024	Gakuen Idolmaster	Temari Tsukimura	
2025	Chaos Zero Nightmare	Priscilla	
2026	Kugayama Shiori's Death Diary	Shiori Kugayama	
2026	Crymelight	Mad	

== Discography ==
Title	Year	Peak chart positions		Album
Title	Year	JPN Dig.	JPN DL	Album
"Luna Say Maybe" (stylized as "Luna say maybe")	2024	22	27	Non-album singles
"Ivy" (アイヴイ)	2024	25	26	Non-album singles
"Kanaetai, Kotabakari" (叶えたい、ことばかり)	2024	18	23	Non-album singles
"—" denotes releases that did not chart or were not released in that region.
