= Kairiki Bear =

Vocaloid artist and songwriter

- Also known as: Kairikibear
- Born: September 30, 1988 (age 38)
- Genre: Rock
- Occupations: Vocaloid producer, Guitarist, songwriter
- Instrument: Guitar
- Years active: 2011–

YouTube information
- Channel: かいりきベア／Kairiki bear
- Genre: Music
- Subscribers: 953 thousand
- Views: 469 million
- Last updated: July 28, 2026

Kairiki Bear (stylised as kairikibear; Japanese: かいりきベア) is a Japanese musician, Vocaloid producer, and songwriter. He is considered to be one of the most influential Vocaloid producers of the late 2010's and 2020's, and is known for "Venom", "Ruma", "Darling Dance", and "Bug".

Since debuting in 2011, he has become one of the most prominent and influential musicians of the Vocaloid genre of the late 2010s and 2020s. His songs often feature fast-paced rhythms, complex lyrics, and themes exploring psychological turmoil, identity, and emotional conflict.

== Career ==
Kairiki Bear is a prominent Japanese Vocaloid producer known for emotionally intense, high-tempo compositions. Starting in 2011, he released his first Vocaloid song 'Wakare no Oto', and has since become known for his fast-paced, emotionally charged compositions using Vocaloid voicebanks such as Hatsune Miku, V Flower, and Kagamine Rin.

His most notable song, Venom (Note: Untranslated title: ベノム), released on August 2, 2018, and totalled 65+ million views on YouTube, due to attention received from TikTok trends.

On January 15, 2020, he released the remix album "Venomer" which peaked at number 12 on the Oricon Weekly Album Chart .

In June 2022, Kairiki Bear launched a new music unit called Retbear, which features anonymous guest vocalists on each track. The debut song, Atamannaka DEAD END, was used as the opening theme for the anime Black Summoner.

Following the success of Venom, he continued to release songs with similar musical and thematic styles, often exploring intense emotions and abstract concepts including Darling Dance, Ángel, Bug, Ruma, Failure Girl (Note: Untranslated title: Shippaisaku Shoujo, 失敗作少女) and Nekuratune Circus, many of which have been featured in Hatsune Miku: Colorful Stage!

He held his first solo live concert, titled Yamiaka Steroid, on April 29, 2024, at Spotify O-EAST in Tokyo. The concert featured visual effects and 3D production, combining traditional Vocaloid music with live elements. Both the afternoon and evening performances were sold out. A Blu-ray edition of the performance is released on June 18, 2025, and includes 27 songs along with limited content from the daytime performance.

== Discography ==
=== Albums ===
Title	Release Date
Pudding Dabaa!	February 5, 2012
Lolita Machiavellism	December 31, 2013
Imitation Gallery	March 4, 2015
Seidenki Girl	August 16, 2015
Inai Inai Reboot	April 28, 2018
Venomer	January 15, 2020
Darling Syndrome	June 19, 2021
Bug Effect	April 26, 2025
