= Imase =

Japanese musician

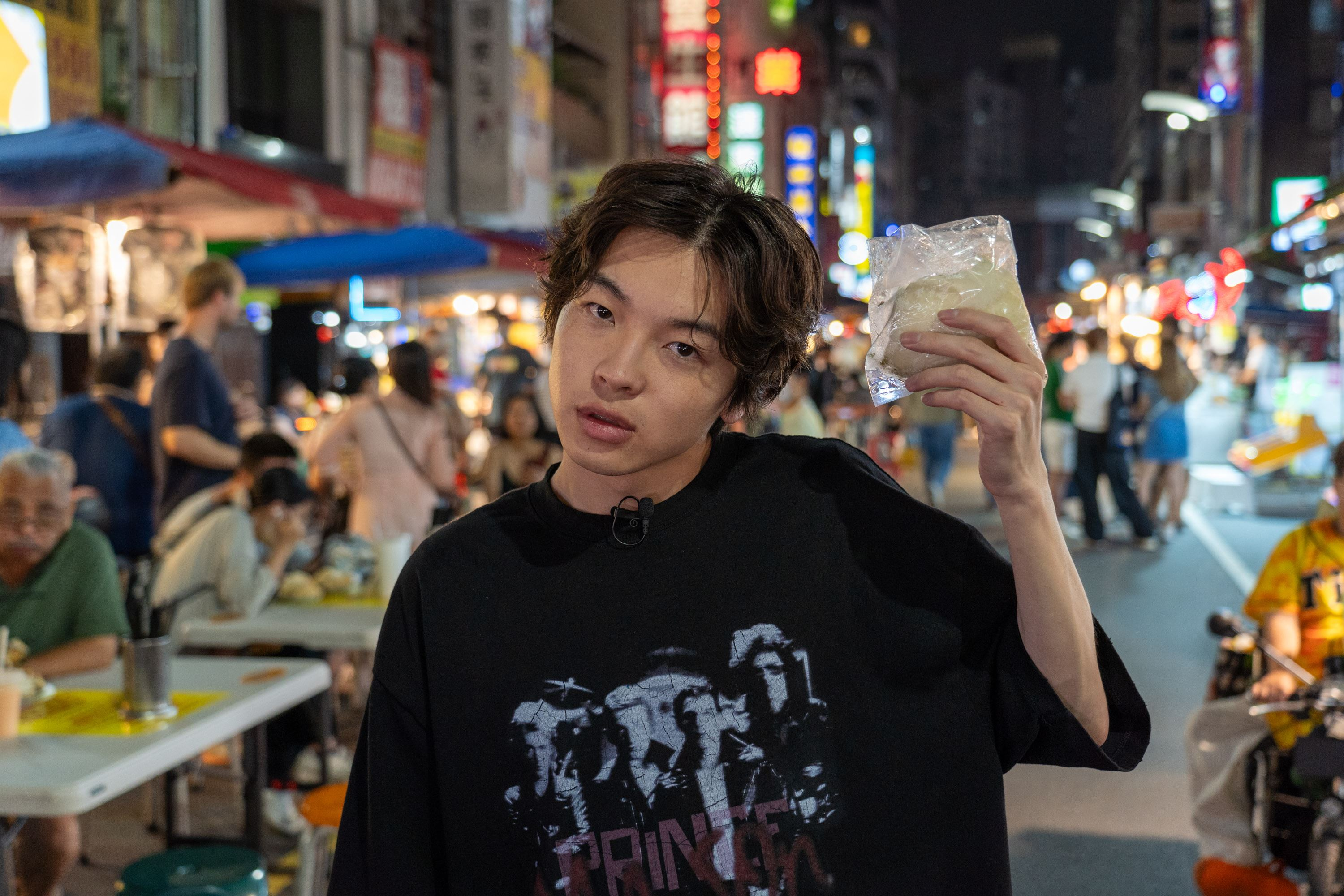
- Imase in 2023

Background information
- Born: November 9, 2000 (age 25)
- Origin: Gifu Prefecture, Japan
- Genre: J-pop
- Occupation: Singer-songwriter
- Years active: 2021–present
- Label: Universal Music Japan
- Website: www.imase-official.com

Imase (stylized in all lowercase; born November 9, 2000) is a Japanese singer-songwriter who debuted in 2021 and found success with the 2022 viral single "Night Dancer". His first EP, Pop Cube, was released in 2022 by Universal Music Japan.

He debuted in 2021 with his single "Have a Nice Day" only a year after learning how to write and compose music, according to his signed label Universal Music Japan. His success with "Night Dancer" only a year later has given him the "monster rookie" nickname.

Junji Ishiwatari, a former member of alternative rock band Supercar, called Imase's sudden rise to stardom "a true event that is stranger than fiction". Five months after his debut, Imase was hired to sing the Pocari Sweat jingle, which is considered an honor, and he had over 1 billion TikTok views.

On August 19, 2022, he wrote his most famous song, called "Night Dancer", the song's name associating with light and darkness. The lyrics evoke a sense of nostalgia and a desire to cherish the present moment, with themes of love and joy. The song went viral and was highly successful, especially in South Korea. It was also the first J-pop song to enter the Top 20 in South Korea. He became a topic of interest on South Korean blogging forums after "Night Dancer" entered the Melon 100 chart, the first ever Japanese song and Japanese singer to achieve this feat.

In 2023, Imase produced the songs "Jewelry" and "Dresscode" for the K-pop group Le Sserafim.

His song "Outline" was selected as the official theme song for the 103rd All Japan High School Soccer Tournament. Imase also performed the song live on the final day of the competition on January 13, 2025.

On August 4, 2025, he announced that he would take a break from his artistic activities because of his deteriorated health conditions after the concert at Nippon Budokan on July 25, 2025, according to his official website. On September 4, 2026, he published a statement announcing his return. On October 2, 2026, his sophomore EP "Hatena" was released on streaming platforms.

== Discography ==
=== Studio albums ===
Title	Album details	Peak chart positions	Sales
Title	Album details	JPN	Sales
Bonsai (凡才)	Released: May 15, 2024; Label: Universal Music Japan; Formats: CD, digital download, streaming	4	JPN: 11,328

=== Extended plays ===
Title	EP details	Peak chart positions
Title	EP details	JPN Dig.
Pop Cube	Released: November 9, 2022; Label: Universal Music Japan; Formats: Digital download	18
Hatena (はてな)	Released: October 2, 2026; Label: Universal Music Japan; Formats: Digital download	23

=== Singles ===
Title	Year	Peak chart positions				Certifications	Album
Title	Year	JPN Hot	KOR	SGP Reg.	WW	Certifications	Album
"Have a Nice Day"	2021	— (Note: "Have a Nice Day" did not enter the Billboard Japan Hot 100, but it peaked at number 4 on the Heatseekers Songs chart.)	—	—	—	RIAJ: Gold (st.)	Pop Cube
"Escape" (逃避行)	2022	— (Note: "Escape" did not enter the Billboard Japan Hot 100, but it peaked at number 15 on the Heatseekers Songs chart.)	—	—	—		Pop Cube
"Pale Rain" (with Punpee and Toby Fox)	2022	—	—	—	—		Non-album single
"Demone, Tamaniwa" (でもね、たまには)	2022	—	—	—	—		Pop Cube
"Night Dancer"	2022	38	14	28	112	RIAJ: Platinum (st.)	Pop Cube
"Utau" (うたう)	2022	—	—	—	—		Non-album single
"Analog Life" (アナログライフ)	2022	—	—	—	—		Pop Cube
"Abekobe" (あべこべ)	2022	—	—	—	—		Pop Cube
"Bokurada" (僕らだ)	2023	—	—	—	—		Bonsai
"Period" (ピリオド)	2023	—	—	—	—		Bonsai
"Night Dancer" (TeddyLoid remix)	2023	—	—	—	—		Non-album single
"18"	2023	—	—	—	—		Bonsai
"Night Dancer" (Big Naughty remix)	2023	—	81	—	—		Non-album single
"Nagisa"	2023	29	—	—	—	RIAJ: Gold (st.)	Bonsai
"Melodrama" (メロドラマ) (with Natori)	2024	98	—	—	—		Non-album singles
"Et cetera" (エトセトラ)	2024	—	—	—	—		Non-album singles
"Metrocity" (メトロシティ) (with Natori)	2024	98	—	—	—		

== Tours ==
Imase Online Live "Pop Room" (via "Uliza", a video streaming platform)

Imase 1st Live "Pop Over"

Venue	Date	Ref(s)
Liquid Room	May 10, 2023	

1st Showcase in Korea

Venue	Date	Ref(s)
Musina Garage Music Hall (Hongdae, Seoul)	April 13, 2023	

"Night-Dance ซิ่ง with imase"

Venue	Date	Ref(s)
Groove Central World, Thailand	June 20, 2023	

Imase Tour 2023 "Utopia"

Venue	Date	Ref(s)
Big Cat	October 26, 2023	
Nagoya Club Quattro	October 27, 2023	
Zepp Shinjuku (Tokyo)	October 31, 2023	
