= Natori (musician) =

Japanese singer-songwriter

natori なとり
- Born: January 31, 2003 (age 23)
- Origin: Japan
- Genres: J-pop; rock
- Occupations: Singer-songwriter; record producer
- Instruments: Vocals; guitar; programming
- Years active: 2021–present
- Labels: Siritoriyowai Records (2022); Sony Music Labels (2023–present)
- Website: natori-official.com

YouTube information
- Channel: なとり / natori
- Years active: 2021–present
- Subscribers: 1.46 million
- Views: 1.06 billion
- Last updated: September 20, 2026

Natori (なとり; stylized in lowercase; born January 31, 2003) is a Japanese singer-songwriter and record producer, best known for his debut single "Overdose", In addition he has produced music for anime such as Wind Breaker and Oshi no Ko.

His style has been described as eclectic, drawing on various genres such as Vocaloid, city pop, R&B, and Western pop music.

== Career ==
In May 2021, he began his activities by posting the demo of an original song titled "Terminal" on TikTok; by mid-2022, he had shared over thirty short versions of his original songs. His song "Overdose", posted in May 2022, gained significant attention, leading to the release of its full version as a digital single in September of the same year. By January 2023, the song had accumulated over 150 million total streams and had spent 13 weeks on the Billboard Japan Streaming Songs chart. It has also been covered by numerous artists, most notably Ado. As of March 2025, "Overdose" had surpassed 200 million streams, marking it as a major hit.

On January 7, 2023, Natori was ranked third in the New Year's special feature "This Will Buzz This Year! BEST10" on the NTV music program "Buzz Rhythm 02".

In January 2023, Spotify included him in its annual "RADAR: Early Noise" playlist, which highlights ten artists expected to have a breakthrough that year. The program has previously selected artists who have since risen to prominence in the J-pop scene, such as Official Hige Dandism, King Gnu, Fujii Kaze, and Vaundy.

On December 20, 2023, Natori released his first original album, Theater (劇場, Gekijō). The album also had a limited edition, which included an additional artboard, booklet and stylised playing cards.

On March 29, 2024, he held his first solo live concert, "Natori 1st ONE-MAN LIVE 'Theater'", at Zepp Haneda, followed by another performance at Zepp Bayside Osaka on April 5, 2024.

In April 2024, he provided the opening song for the Wind Breaker anime series, Absolute Zero (絶対零度, Zettaireido), with its official release as his first physical single on May 22. Later that year, in September, a collaboration between him and Tatsuya Kitani, "Chained" (いらないもの, Iranai Mono), was used as the opening song for the second season of the 2023 adaptation of Rurouni Kenshin.

In September 2024, he and imase's song Melodrama (メロドラマ, Merodorama) was featured in vehicle manufacturer Nissan's commercial "NISSAN LOVE STORY" to commemorate Nissan's 90th Anniversary.

In December 2024, Natori announced his art book, titled Face, also known by Mirror Surface. The book contains artwork related to his past 17 song releases. It was listed on his online store, "Natorium," in limited stock; it was released on March 12, 2025 to pre-order.

In January 2026, he provided the ending theme for the third season of Oshi no Ko with the song Serenade (セレナーデ, Serenāde), and released his 2nd album The Abyss (深海, Shinkai) on the 21st.

In addition to his own musical activities, Natori has written and produced songs for other artists, such as Kobo Kanaeru, Ado, Fuwa Minato, and Hoshimachi Suisei, as well as releasing collaborations with fellow J-pop artists such as Imase, Tatsuya Kitani and Taku Inoue. He also contributed to Fall Apart, a tribute album dedicated to Vocaloid producer Balloon (also known as Keina Suda), with a cover of the song Mabel (メーベル, Mēberu). Natori also had a collaboration with the shoe company Nike based on his song "Overdose" to produce various designs for the Air Max Excees.

== Discography ==
=== Albums ===
Title	Release date	Label
Theater (劇場) Track listing: 1. "Theater" (劇場); 2. "Fool’s Table" (食卓); 3. "Monkey Show" (猿芝居); 4. "Overdose"; 5. "Friday Night" (フライデー・ナイト); 6. "Sleepwalk"; 7. "Osmanthus" (金木犀); 8. "A Night To Sing With You" (夜の歯車); 9. "Eureka" (エウレカ); 10. "Cult."; 11. "Love-song" (ラブソング); 12. "Terminal" (ターミナル); 13. "Curtain Call" (カーテンコール)	December 20, 2023	Sony Music Labels
The Abyss (深海) Track listing: 1. "The Abyss" (深海); 2. "HelpMeTakeMe" (ヘルプミーテイクミー); 3. "Serenade" (セレナーデ); 4. "What Is Ahead Of The Tunnel?" (にわかには信じがたいものです); 5. "Dressing Room"; 6. "Eat"; 7. "Flash Back"; 8. "Propose" (プロポーズ); 9. "Just Between Us" (恋する季節); 10. "No Emergency Door" (非常口 逃げてみた); 11. "Infection" (君と電波塔の交信); 12. "In_My_Head"; 13. "Absolute Zero" (絶対零度); 14. "Speed"; 15. "Nostalgia" (帰りの会); 16. "Threads That Connect Us" (糸電話); 17. "Birthday Song" (バースデイ・ソング); 18. "The Abyss-ed" (うみのそこでまってる)	January 21, 2026	Sony Music Labels

=== Extended plays ===
Title	Release date	Label
Chained (いらないもの; w/ Tatsuya Kitani) Track listing: 1. "Chained" (いらないもの); 2. "Overwritten" (上書きしちゃった)	November 13, 2024	Sony Music Labels

=== Digital singles ===
Title	Year	Peak chart positions		Certifications	Album
Title	Year	JPN Hot	WW	Certifications	Album
"Overdose"	2022	4	140	RIAJ: 3× Platinum (st.)	Theater
"Sarushibai" (猿芝居)	2023	—	—		Theater
"Friday Night" (フライデー・ナイト)	2023	24	—	RIAJ: Platinum (st.)	Theater
"Eureka" (エウレカ)	2023	—	—		Theater
"Osmanthus" (金木犀)	2023	—	—		Theater
"Fool's Table" (食卓)	2023	—	—		Theater
"Cult."	2023	—	—		Theater
"Sleepwalk"	2023	97	—		Theater
"Absolute Zero" (絶対零度)	2024	44	—	RIAJ: Gold (st.)	The Abyss
"Thread That Connects Us" (糸電話)	2024	—	—		The Abyss
"In_My_Head"	2024	—	—		The Abyss
"Dressing Room"	2025	—	—		The Abyss
"Speed"	2025	—	—		The Abyss
"Propose" (プロポーズ)	2025	21	—	RIAJ: Gold (st.)	The Abyss
"No Emergency Door" (非常口 逃げてみた)	2025	—	—		The Abyss
"What Is Ahead of the Tunnel?" ("にわかには信じがたいものです?)	2025	—	—		The Abyss
"Serenade" (セレナーデ)	2026	27	—		The Abyss
"Poltergeist" (ポルターガイスト)	2026	—	—		Non-album single
"Puppet"	2026	—	—		Non-album single
"Pupa"	2026	—	—		Non-album single
"—" denotes releases that did not chart or were not released in that region.

=== CD singles ===
Title	Release date	Label
"Absolute Zero" (絶対零度) Track listing: 1. "Absolute Zero" (絶対零度); 2. "The Saints" (聖者たち)	April 5, 2024	Sony Music Labels
"Serenade" (セレナーデ) Track listing: 1. "Serenade" (セレナーデ); 2. "Living Dead" (リビングデッド); 3. "Catherine"	February 4, 2026	Sony Music Labels

=== Songwriting credits ===
Title	Collaborated artist	Release date	Album	Label
"Help!!"	Kobo Kanaeru	March 28, 2024	Non-album single	Universal Music
"Mirror"	Ado	May 31, 2024	Zanmu	Virgin/Universal Music
"Violet!?"	Fuwa Minato	September 4, 2024	Persona	AnyColor
"Moonlight" (ムーンライト)	Hoshimachi Suisei	October 1, 2024	Shinsei Mokuroku	COVER Corp

=== As featured artist ===
Title	Featured artist	Release date	Album	Label
"Melodrama" (メロドラマ)	Imase	August 30, 2024	Non-album singles	Sony Music Labels
"Metrocity" (メトロシティ)	Imase	September 25, 2024	Non-album singles	Virgin/Universal Music
"Chained" (いらないもの)	Tatsuya Kitani	October 4, 2024	Non-album singles	Sony Music Labels
"Overwritten" (上書きしちゃった)	Tatsuya Kitani	October 4, 2024	Non-album singles	Sony Music Labels
"Lights Off" (ライツオフ)	Taku Inoue	December 4, 2024	Non-album singles	Toy's Factory
"Crash" (クラッシュ)	WurtS	November 26, 2025	Digital Love	EMI

== Concert performances ==
=== One-man performances ===
Titles	Dates	Venues
1ST ONE-MAN LIVE	March 29, 2024; April 5, 2024	Zepp Haneda; Zepp Osaka Bayside
2ND ONE-MAN LIVE	October 10-11, 2024; October 18-19, 2024	Orix Theater; Pacifico Yokohama National Grand Hall
3RD ONE-MAN LIVE	February 18-19, 2026	Nippon Budokan

=== Tours ===
Titles	Dates	Venues
ONE-MAN TOUR "FRICTION"	May 9, 2025; May 17, 2025; May 18, 2025; May 22-23, 2025; June 1, 2025	Zepp Nagoya; Zepp Osaka Bayside; Zepp Fukuoka; Zepp DiverCity (TOKYO); Zepp Sapporo.
natori ASIA TOUR 2025	October 26, 2025; November 8, 2025; November 21-22, 2025; November 28, 2025; November 30, 2025	Zepp New Taipei; Union Hall; YES24 LIVE HALL; VAS est; FULLOF LIVEHOUSE-FU
ONE-MAN LIVE TOUR "MARCH" (行進; KOSHIN)	June 12-13, 2026; June 27-28, 2-26; July 4-5, 2026; July 11-12, 2026; July 18-19, 2026; July 25, 2026; July 2028, 2026; August 8-9, 2026; September 22-23, 2026; September 26-27, 2026; October 12, 2026; October 28, 2026; October 31, 2026; December 5-6, 2026	Tokyo Electron Hall Miyagi; Aichi Prefectural Arts Theater Main Hall; Niigata Prefectural Civic Center; Hondanomori Hokuden Hall; ROHM Theatre Kyoto Main Hall; Olympic Hall; The Theatre at Mediacorp; UOB LIVE; Taipei Music Center; Hitomi Memorial Auditorium; Sunport Hall Takamatsu Large Hall; Fukuoka Civic Hall Large Hall; Grand Cube Osaka Main Hall; Kanamoto Hall; Hiroshima Bunka Gakuen HBG Hall; Tokyo Garden Theater
natori Zepp TOUR 2027	April 6-7, 2027; April 15-16, 2027; April 23-24, 2027; June 18-19, 2027; June 25-26, 2027; July 1-2, 2027	Kanagawa KT Zepp Yokohama; Aichi Zepp Nagoya; Osaka Zepp Osaka Bayside; Fukuoka Zepp Fukuoka; Hokkaido Zepp Sapporo; Tokyo Zepp DiverCity
