= List of The Magical Revolution of the Reincarnated Princess and the Genius Young Lady episodes =

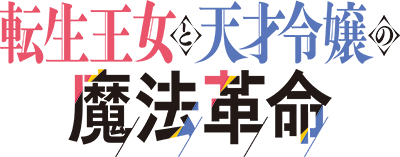

The Magical Revolution of the Reincarnated Princess and the Genius Young Lady is a 12-episode anime television series. It was produced by Diomedéa under the direction of Shingo Tamaki, with scripts written by Wataru Watari, character designs handled by Naomi Ide, creature designs by Tsutomu Miyazawa, and music composed by Moe Hyūga.

The series aired in Japan from January to March 2023. The opening theme song is "Arc-en-Ciel" by Hanatan, while the ending theme song is "Only for You" by Sayaka Senbongi and Manaka Iwami. Crunchyroll streamed the series outside of Asia. Muse Communication licensed the series in South and Southeast Asia.

== Episodes ==
No.	Title	Directed by (Note: Information is taken from the ending credits of each episode.)	Written by	Storyboarded by	Original release date
1	"The Magical Revolution of the Princess and the Young Lady"; Transliteration: "Ōjo to Reijō no Mahō Kakumei" (Japanese: 王女と令嬢の魔法革命)	Shingo Tamaki	Wataru Watari	Shingo Tamaki	January 4, 2023
The first princess of the Kingdom of Palettia, Anisphia, has always loved magic yet cannot use it herself. So to compensate, she used her memories of her previous life on Earth to invent all sorts of magical gadgets in hopes of one day achieving her dream of flying through the sky on a magic broom. Unfortunately, this also led her to become a troublemaker who pushed her responsibilities onto her younger brother, Algard. As part of his duties, the crown prince has an arranged marriage with Euphyllia, the daughter of his father's adviser. However, despite the young lady's attempts to get their relationship to work, there is no love between them, and Algard recently developed an interest in a commoner-turned-noble named Lainie. In the end, the situation escalates after Euphyllia's request to Lainie to sever her relationship with Algard for the greater good of the Kingdom is interpreted as bullying and the crown prince publicly cancels their engagement. Just then, though, Anisphia crash lands onto the scene following a failed flight test. Quickly realizing what is going on, the princess "kidnaps" Euphyllia and flees the scene before the young lady's reputation is damaged further.
2	"Acquisition of an Assistant for Both Profit and Pleasure"; Transliteration: "Shumi to Jitsueki no Joshu Kakutoku" (Japanese: 趣味と実益の助手獲得)	Ageha Kochōran	Sō Sagara	Sorato Shimizu	January 11, 2023
Taking Euphyllia to their parents, king Orfans and prime minister Grantz, Anisphia informs them about Algard breaking off the engagement, much to their shock. As they wonder what is to become of Euphyllia, Anisphia offers to take her in as a research assistant and split the profits between them, doing a pretty bad job at hiding that she has a crush on her. Nonetheless, Grantz agrees to it as it would help repair her reputation and apologizes to his daughter for placing unreachable expectations upon her. Afterward, Euphyllia moves into Anisphia's residence, the Separate Palace. While impressed by the results of the princess' research, seeing how it could be helpful to commoners, she is also concerned about how the nobles would react to such a threat to their authority. Later, whilst sharing a bed, Euphyllia asks Anisphia why she would go so far to help her, to which the princess replies that she just could not stand how sad she looked when her engagement got canceled and tells her to just rest for now.
3	"The Rainbow Magic Sword of Longing and Reminiscence"; Transliteration: "Dōkei to Tsuioku no Kōgei Maken" (Japanese: 憧憬と追憶の虹霓魔剣)	Shōta Ihata	Wataru Watari	Shōta Ihata	January 18, 2023
Sometime after moving in with Anisphia, Euphyllia still has trouble getting used to her new life and laments how she lacks a purpose now that her engagement has been canceled. The princess tries bonding with her whilst testing out some magic tools, but she remains distant. Meanwhile, Orfans and Grantz launch an investigation into the engagement cancellation incident and summon Euphyllia to give testimony, during which she also returns the privileges previously granted to her by her engagement. Later, Anisphia tries to cheer Euphyllia up with a present, a magical sword named Arc-en-Ciel crafted specifically for her. Euphyllia thanks Anisphia for her gift just as the princess collapses from sleep deprivation, having not rested the whole time she was forging the sword. As she lets Anisphia sleep on her lap, Euphyllia expresses that she wishes she could be free like her.
4	"The Princess and the Lost Child Announce Their Decision"; Transliteration: "Hime-sama to Maigo no Ketsui Hyōmei" (Japanese: 姫様と迷子の決意表明)	Yoshino Honda	Sō Sagara	Yoshino Honda	January 25, 2023
Upon waking up, Anisphia finds that Euphyllia has not been sleeping properly either and carries her off to bed. Whilst laying there, Euphyllia expresses how empty she feels without a direction in life and begs Anisphia to give one, but the princess just calmly tells her that they will find it together. The next day, Euphyllia confides in Anisphia's maid, Ilia, about her struggles to find meaning in things unrelated to her given role, prompting the latter to tell her about her own past struggles with finding one's purpose. Just then, however, Anisphia receives notice from the Adventurers' Guild, of which she is a high-ranking member, that a dragon has appeared. Wishing to claim the creature's body for her research, the princess intends to confront it and Euphyllia insists on going along as well. Meanwhile, the country's leadership holds an emergency meeting regarding the dragon where Algard, who has been under house arrest ever since the engagement cancellation, proposes to personally face it. Realizing that his son just wishes to prove himself, Orfans is about to give permission when he is informed that Anisphia and Euphyllia have already set out.
5	"A Magic Medicine and a Magic Sword Subjugate a Magic Dragon"; Transliteration: "Mayaku to Maken no Maryū Tōbatsu" (Japanese: 魔薬と魔剣の魔竜討伐)	Shingo Tamaki	Jakuson Ō	Shingo Tamaki	February 1, 2023
Arriving on the battlefield, Anisphia and Euphyllia aid the adventurers and knights in fighting off a stampede caused by monsters fleeing the dragon. Increasing her strength with a magical medicine she developed, the princess fights her way through the horde to the dragon and faces it in mid-air with her magic broom. However, the creature protects itself from her gadgets with a magical barrier and shoots her down with a breath attack. Fortunately, Euphyllia saves her. While Euphyllia begs her to flee, Anisphia believes that she has to defeat the dragon to be a "magician", causing the young lady to change her mind and help the princess. Taking on the dragon together, they pierce its barrier and defeat it by cutting right through its breath attack using a magic sword. Following its defeat, the dragon telepathically congratulates Anisphia before "cursing" her by seemingly transferring its own soul into her. Afterward, Anisphia and Euphyllia attend a victory party but the princess struggles to fit in while the young lady finds herself uncomfortable around men following the engagement cancellation incident, prompting them to instead dance with each other outside on the balcony.
6	"Getting to the Truth of the Annulment and the Fascination"; Transliteration: "Hadan to Miryō no Shinsō Kyūmei" (Japanese: 破談と魅了の真相究明)	Keizō Kusakawa	Wataru Watari	Keizō Kusakawa	February 8, 2023
Anisphia visits her research partner, Tilty, to discuss her plans for the materials she got from the dragon. To stop the creature's "curse" from encroaching on her, Anisphia has Tilty tattoo the materials onto her back, allowing her to use its magic whilst retaining her humanity. At the same time, she is called in by her mother, Sylphine, to aid in the investigation into the engagement cancellation incident. Questioning one of Algard's friends who sided with him, Anisphia discovers that he does not remember anything from the incident. The next day, Lainie and her father, baron Drax, are called in for interrogation. While Lainie claims to not have had any romantic interest in Algard and Orfans believes her, Anisphia realizes something is off and takes her to speak in private. Examining her, the princess realizes what is going on: Lainie constantly gives off a charm and makes others infatuated with her. Informing her parents, it is decided that Lainie will move in with Anisphia to learn to control her ability. Elsewhere, Algard converses with the minister of magic, Count Chartreuse, about how they will need to step up their plans now that Lainie has been discovered.
7	"The Magic Lecture of the Founder and the Assistant"; Transliteration: "Kaiso to Joshu no Magaku Kōen" (Japanese: 開祖と助手の魔学講演)	Ageha Kochōran	Jakuson Ō	Sorato Shimizu	February 15, 2023
Upon moving into the Separate Palace, Lainie quickly reconciles with Euphyllia regarding her part in the engagement cancellation. Bringing in Tilty to examine Lainie, she and Anisphia quickly realize the origin of her charm ability: she is a vampire; a race born from a mad magician's attempts to become immortal. While they manage to teach her to control her ability, this also causes her blood cravings to manifest, which Ilia helps alleviate by letting her suck hers. Meanwhile, Euphyllia becomes envious of Tilty upon seeing how well she and Anisphia work together. In response, Tilty tells her that, with her reputation having been restored following the dragon fight, she must make up her mind to either fully support Anisphia or not at all. Later, Anisphia is requested to do a lecture on her inventions. However, the audience, composed of nobles opposed to her research, constantly ridicules her. Fortunately, Euphyllia then takes over as spokesperson and convinces everyone of the advantages that the princess' gadgets could bring before revealing a design for a mass-produced version of her flying broom, leaving Anisphia feeling grateful to her for standing up for her.
8	"The Magic Definition of the Monster and the Commoner"; Transliteration: "Kaibutsu to Bongu no Mahō Teigi" (Japanese: 怪物と凡愚の魔法定義)	Shōta Ihata	Sō Sagara	Shōta Ihata	February 22, 2023
At the Separate Palace, an alarm suddenly goes off, meaning someone infiltrated the residence. Ilia and Lainie try to flee but are intercepted by the assailant, who is revealed to be Algard. Meanwhile, at the post-lecture party, one of Algard's friends who attended the presentation, Moritz Chartreuse, constantly tries to start a conversation with Anisphia, much to her annoyance. However, upon hearing the alarm going off, the princess realizes that the lecture was a distraction and rushes back with Euphyllia while Tilty restrains the guards using her magic. Upon arriving, Anisphia and Euphyllia find Ilia and Lainie mortally wounded at Algard's hand, who ripped out the magic crystal that is the source of Lainie's powers from her body and put it in himself to become a vampire as well. While Euphyllia heals Ilia and Lainie with her magic, Anisphia questions Algard's motives, to which he reveals that the kingdom was grown corrupt so he intends to start a "revolution" to overturn the current order. Realizing her brother is just suffering from an inferiority complex toward her, Anisphia rejects his vision and prepares to fight him to stop him.
9	"The Sister and Brother, and for Whom the Crown Is Intended"; Transliteration: "Kyōdai to Dare ga Tame no Ōkan" (Japanese: 姉弟と誰がための王冠)	Shingo Tamaki	Wataru Watari	Shingo Tamaki	March 1, 2023
Anisphia faces off against Algard but is slowly being pressured. Meanwhile, Euphyllia continues healing Ilia and Lainie but finds the latter's wounds to be too severe. Fortunately, Ilia force-feeds the vampire her blood, causing her to regenerate. Back with Anisphia, using her newly acquired dragon magic, the princess turns the tide and is about to deliver the finishing blow but is stopped by Euphyllia. With Algard yielding, the siblings then have a heart-to-heart during which the prince reveals that he always knew Anisphia would make a better ruler than him and hated his magic-obsessed country for rejecting her. In the aftermath, Algard takes full responsibility for his crimes and Orfans disinherits him. The truth of the engagement cancellation incident is also finally revealed: it was part of a plot orchestrated by Count Chartreuse to brainwash high-ranking nobles using Lainie's charm. On the day of Algard's exile from the palace, Euphyllia and Lainie confront him. In the end, Lainie forgives him while he and Euphyllia both admit to their own part in their relationship falling apart. Algard requests Euphyllia take care of Anisphia before departing, after which the young lady returns to the recovering princess' bedside.
10	"The Royal Succession of Resignation and Fury"; Transliteration: "Teikan to Gekijō no Ōi Keishō" (Japanese: 諦観と激情の王位継承)	Ageha Kochōran	Sō Sagara	Yoshino Honda	March 8, 2023
Following Algard's disinheritance, Anisphia is now the de facto heir to the throne, a position which she reluctantly accepts. Euphyllia offers the princess her assistance but she is adamant that it is not her concern. Tilty, however, is angered by Anisphia putting up a happy facade whilst resigning herself to her royal obligations. Euphyllia soon begins to understand Tilty's perspective following an excursion into town with Anisphia and witnessing the princess' laboratory cleared out: if Anisphia becomes queen her freedom will be restricted and she would be unable to pursue her research. Euphyllia then confronts her father, Grantz, with her wish for Anisphia not to have the throne pushed upon her and he reveals that there is a way. However, he is interrupted by the sudden arrival of a mysterious girl named Lumielle. The girl reveals that the kingdom's first king entered into a covenant with a great spirit and that Euphyllia has the qualifications to do so as well, making her eligible for the throne provided she succeeds. However, being a Spirit Covenanter herself, Lumielle is against this and tells her a story to try to dissuade her.
11	"The Spirit Contract of Despair and Determination"; Transliteration: "Shitsui to Ketsui no Seirei Keiyaku" (Japanese: 失意と決意の精霊契約)	Keizō Kusakawa	Wataru Watari	Keizō Kusakawa	March 15, 2023
As Anisphia struggles to win the nobles' support, she is called by Euphyllia for a meeting with their parents and Lumielle. Euphyllia reveals that she has the qualifications for a Spirit Covenant and intends to do so under the provision that the King adopt her so she might inherit the throne. Despite Anisphia objecting upon learning from Lumielle that Spirit Covenanters are immortal, condemning them to solitude, the young lady remains undeterred, set on "protecting the princess' smile". However, Anisphia grows angered at her for trying to "steal her identity" and runs off in tears before being found by Tilty. At Tilty's place, the princess opens up to her about always having felt like an outcast, to which the latter simply proposes they run away but the former turns her down since "she is a princess". Euphyllia then arrives and has a heart-to-heart with Anisphia during which the latter reveals that she has always been jealous of the magic prodigy whilst lamenting being a failure as a royal. In the end, the princess remains unwilling to give up her birthright or sacrifice Euphyllia's humanity. So, with neither of them backing down, Anisphia proposes they settle their argument through a duel.
12	"Their Magical Revolution"; Transliteration: "Kanojo to Kanojo no Mahō Kakumei" (Japanese: 彼女と彼女の魔法革命)	Shingo Tamaki	Wataru Watari	Shingo Tamaki	March 22, 2023
The two duel furiously with swords and spells, saying they want to spare the other the burden of being Queen. During the duel, Euphyllia completes her Spirit Covenant, eliminating Anisphia's reason to fight her. Euphyllia defeats Anisphia with a rainbow beam, then says Anisphia was the reason she became strong. Anisphia apologizes to her parents, but they express pride in her. Later, Anisphia visits Euphyllia's bedroom, tells her about her previous life on Earth, then expresses her fears that she might be a "fake" who erased the real Anisphia's soul. Euphyllia assures her that is not true, then confesses her love and kisses her. The next day, the King and Queen step down and make Euphyllia the Queen, charging Anisphia to take care of her. They reveal their plans to make magic available to everyone and slowly dissolve the lines between commoners and nobles. Working together, they commission the invention of flying machines. Euphyllia gifts Anisphia a magic sword called "Celestial". At the flying machines' demonstration, the two reveal clothes that allow the wearer to fly and demonstrate them along with spectacular displays of magic. A narration says by making everyone equal, Euphyllia became the last Queen. Later, as the two eat breakfast and go to a meeting, Euphyllia kisses Anisphia and teases her for being shy about public displays of affection.
