= List of The Magical Revolution of the Reincarnated Princess and the Genius Young Lady volumes =

The Magical Revolution of the Reincarnated Princess and the Genius Young Lady is a Japanese light novel series written by Piero Karasu and illustrated by Yuri Kisaragi, which later received a manga adaptation. The series follows Anisphia, a princess who uses her memories of a past life to pursue her theory of "magicology", and Euphyllia, an talented magic user left disgraced after the kingdom's prince breaks off their engagement.

The series was originally serialized online between February 2019 and August 2021 on the user-generated novel publishing website Shōsetsuka ni Narō. It was later acquired by Fujimi Shobo and published under their light novel imprint Fujimi Fantasia Bunko, which was announced on October 10, 2019, with the first volume being released on January 18, 2020. The series ended with the release of its thirteenth volume on February 20, 2026. The light novels are licensed in North America by Yen Press.

A manga adaptation with art by Harutsugu Nadaka was serialized in ASCII Media Works' magazine Dengeki Maoh from July 27, 2020, to March 27, 2026. The adaptation's tankōbon releases are set to conclude with the ninth volume on June 26, 2026. The manga is licensed in North America by Yen Press.

== Light novels ==
No.	Original release date	Original ISBN	English release date	English ISBN
1	January 18, 2020	978-4-04-073476-7	April 12, 2022	978-1-9753-3780-3
Opening; Chapter 1: The Reincarnated Princess Can’t Brake Suddenly; Chapter 2: The Reincarnated Princess Makes a House Call; Chapter 3: The Reincarnated Princess’s Magicology Lesson; Chapter 4: Like Picturing a Rainbow; Chapter 5: The Reincarnated Princess Still Yearns for Magic; Ending
2	May 20, 2020	978-4-04-073691-4	August 16, 2022	978-1-9753-3782-7
Opening; Chapter 1: A Momentary Calm; Chapter 2: The Girl of Destiny; Chapter 3: A Fairy-Tale Monster; Chapter 4: The Value of Magicology; Chapter 5: A Night of Rebellion; Chapter 6: To Whom the Crown Should Pass; Ending
3	January 20, 2021	978-4-04-073916-8	December 13, 2022	978-1-9753-3784-1
Opening; Chapter 1: Unclearing Sorrow; Chapter 2: Secret Outing to the Castle Town; Chapter 3: Mothers and Daughters; Chapter 4: The Available Options; Chapter 5: The Girl with the Spirit Covenant; Chapter 6: An Unsought Intervention; Chapter 7: Blind Eyes Unturned; Chapter 8: For Whom Magic Exists; Chapter 9: Peeling Off the Mask; Chapter 10: For a Free Tomorrow; Chapter 11: The Magic of Beginnings; Ending
4	August 20, 2021	978-4-04-074220-5	April 18, 2023	978-1-9753-5165-6
Opening; Chapter 1: Meeting a New Friend; Chapter 2: Setting Boundaries; Chapter 3: Let’s Build a New Magical Tool!; Chapter 4: Signs of Change; Chapter 5: The Troubles of a Vampire Girl; Interlude: Like a Ripple Expanding; Chapter 6: Exchanging Words, Discussing the Future; Chapter 7: Anisphia’s Birthday Gala; Ending
5	August 20, 2022	978-4-04-074610-4	August 22, 2023	978-1-9753-6903-3
Opening; Chapter 1: Sister and Brother, Kindred Hearts; Chapter 2: Isn’t That Basically a Honeymoon?!; Chapter 3: A Date amid a City of Flowers; Chapter 4: Roaring to the Heavens; Chapter 5: A Reunion and a Fresh Face; Chapter 6: Encounter with a Wandering Soul; Chapter 7: You’re Beautiful; Chapter 8: Two Hearts Reconnecting; Chapter 9: Amid the Great Current; Ending
6	January 20, 2023	978-4-04-074846-7	March 19, 2024	978-1-9753-8049-6
Opening; Chapter 1: Lainie’s Wish; Chapter 2: In Search of Her Mother; Chapter 3: A Quiet Disturbance; Chapter 4: Chaos Incarnate; Chapter 5: A Budding Emergency; Chapter 6: Once More into the Frontier; Chapter 7: Moonlit Fate; Chapter 8: A Contented Princess; Chapter 9: Drawing a Rainbow Through the Dawn; Ending
7	July 20, 2023	978-4-04-075022-4	July 23, 2024	978-1-9753-9245-1
Opening; Chapter 1: Fresh Challenges; Chapter 2: A City of Dreams; Chapter 3: A Desired Location; Chapter 4: Setting Out; Chapter 5: Onward to a New Land; Chapter 6: New Trials; Chapter 7: The Profundities of Magic; Chapter 8: The Way of Strength; Chapter 9: With Sword in Hand; Ending
8	February 20, 2024	978-4-04-075023-1	November 26, 2024	979-8-8554-0709-9
Opening; Chapter 1: Dissonant Passions; Chapter 2: Mounting Losses; Chapter 3: A Dragon Slayer’s Fury; Interlude: Lainie’s Mission; Chapter 4: The Ideal Ruler; Chapter 5: Passing Judgment; Chapter 6: A View to the Future; Ending
SS	August 20, 2024	978-4-04-075581-6	January 27, 2026	979-8-8554-2144-6
Opening; Episode 1: The Reincarnated Princess and the Genius Young Lady's Aerial Stroll; Episode 2: Mother and Child; Episode 3: A Puzzle Called Love; Episode 4: Revenge for Love; Episode 5: A Landscape of Memories Doesn't Move the Clock Forward; Episode 6: Halphys's Marriage; Episode 7: Two Against One
9	September 20, 2024	978-4-04-075617-2	June 9, 2026	979-8-8554-1895-8
Opening; Chapter 1: Signs of Trouble; Chapter 2: A Surprise Encounter; Chapter 3: The Abyss of Emptiness; Chapter 4: Late-Night Conspiracies; Chapter 5: A Surly Queen; Interlude: Melancholy; Chapter 6: The Roar of Thunder; Chapter 7: The Crimson Lotus Emperor; Chapter 8: Toward a Brighter Future; Ending
10	February 20, 2025	978-4-04-075780-3	April 13, 2027	979-8-8554-2283-2
11	June 20, 2025	978-4-04-075939-5	—	—
12	January 20, 2026	978-4-04-075980-7	—	—
13	February 20, 2026	978-4-04-076299-9	—	—

== Manga ==
No.	Original release date	Original ISBN	English release date	English ISBN
1	January 27, 2021	978-4-04-913655-5	May 24, 2022	978-1-9753-3868-8
Chapters 1–5; Bonus
2	August 27, 2021	978-4-04-913896-2	September 6, 2022	978-1-9753-4536-5
Chapters 6–11; Bonus
3	February 10, 2022	978-4-04-914251-8	December 13, 2022	978-1-9753-5273-8
Chapters 12–17; Bonus
4	August 26, 2022	978-4-04-914551-9	June 20, 2023	978-1-9753-6936-1
Chapters 18–23; Bonus
5	March 27, 2023	978-4-04-914881-7	March 19, 2024	978-1-9753-8035-9
Chapters 24–29; Bonus
6	December 27, 2023	978-4-04-915432-0	December 10, 2024	979-8-8554-0674-0
Chapters 30–36; Bonus
7	February 10, 2025	978-4-04-916026-0	February 24, 2026	979-8-8554-2499-7
Chapters 37–42; Bonus
8	November 27, 2025	978-4-04-916814-3	February 23, 2027	979-8-8554-4980-8
Chapters 43–48; Bonus
9	June 26, 2026	978-4-04-952286-0	—	—
