= Elfensjón =

Japanese doujin music circle

- Origin: Japan
- Genres: Symphonic metal; Gothic rock; Alternative rock; Doujin music
- Years active: 2018–present: Independent
- Members: Keisuke Kurose; Kachiru Ishizue
- Website: elfensjon.site

Elfensjón (エルフェンシオン, Erufenshion) is a Japanese doujin music circle founded by metal composer Keisuke Kurose and mangaka/illustrator Kachiru Ishizue in the end of 2018.

== History ==
The music circle Elfensjón was formed in the end of 2018 by Keisuke Kurose who was member in Japanese music groups Asriel and Uroboros prior the formation of the group and manga artist Kachiru Ishizue who has worked on several manga projects including Ilegenes - Kokuyō no Kiseki and Rosen Blood. In an interview with Jrocknews held in February 2025, Keisuke Kurose explained that he first met Ishizue when he was still a member of Asriel. Both decided on working on a collaboration project in the future. In the end, it was Ishizue who could convince Kurose to start the music project. Even until the year of 2017, they both were unable to find a concept. They both share a love for dark fantasy which would later become the fundamental concept of Elfensjón.

The duo is supported by various doujin musicians like vocalist okogeeechann of Adust Rain, guitarist Myu of Imy and violinist Yū. The first EP, entitled Einherjar was released on December 26, 2018. In August 2019 the group released mini album Ash of Rouge on two CDs which was sold during the Comiket the same year. In the beginning of 2020 Elfensjón were part of a four-split release entitled Veiled including other musicians and doujin circles like Imy, Powerless and ViViX.

In September 2020 Elfensjón announced the release of their first full-length album called STYX which was released on November 11, 2020. On October 11, 2021 the project announced on YouTube the release of their fourth work entitled Ephemera for a winter 2021 release. A month later the circle released the first single for the upcoming album called Toge. Along with the release of the second single Majo no Naraku on November 23, 2021 it was announced that Ephemera would be released on December 24 the same year with pre-orders starting two weeks prior to the albums release.

After releasing their third full-length album Zenith in April 2024, the project was announced to perform the third ending theme song for the anime series Why Does Nobody Remember Me in This World? entitled Umbra. The song received a physical release on CD on September 25, 2024 via Japanese music company Fabtone Inc. The project released a new song titled Lueur Blanche accompanied with a music video on April 2, 2025 and announced the release of their EP Anima for June 18, later that year.

== Musical style ==
The songs of the music circle which are all written in Japanese handling fantastical themes telling a story of the characters Elisia. Astral, Lilith, Seth and Alstroemeria which are relation more or less. Astral and Elisia are siblings hailing from a demon clan who are on a journey searching for the white witch in hopes getting their deepest wish granted. One day, Elisia driven by jealousy kills her brother which was brought to the underworld where he meets with Seth whose duty is to guide the souls of the deceased. Seth himself searches for the soul of Alstroemeria to bring her back to her body ignoring that this is against his task. Astral will later be revived as an immortal by the wish of his sister Elisia granted by the white witch. The album's stories take place in one unnamed fictional universe. Keisuke Kurose told in an interview that he took inspiration from videogames like Dark Souls, Bloodborne and Diablo for the creation of said universe.

The music of the doujin circle mixes Rock, Metal and djent. Due to the usage of anime influences in their music videos and illustrations the circle created the term ′Animecore′ to describe their music. According to Tobias Dahs who reviewed Ephemera for German metal webzine Powermetal.de the sound of the project is influenced by the participating guest members and calls the opener Wiegenlied a strange mixture of J-pop, Babymetal and symphonic tunes while describing the tracks Hrafntinna, Fallen and Undead Sin as an alternative rock trilogy with straight forward and understandable song structures. Calder Dougherty of Heavyblogisheavy wrote that the guitar playing style is influenced by international progressive and speed metal acts like DragonForce, TesseracT and Periphery. The musical repertoire of the group ranges between tearfull piano and guitar passages, djent-like anime bangers to large ragtime songs, which would even Between the Buried and Me make quit.

== Other ==
ELFENSJóN has licensed many of its songs to the rhythm game Osu! via its Featured Artist program. This means users are free to create and upload levels using any of those songs.

== Discography ==
=== Studio albums ===
Title	Details	Peak positions			Notes
Title	Details	JPN	JPN Comb.	JPN Hot	Notes
Ash of Rouge	Released: August 12, 2019; Label: Independent; Formats: CD, Download, Streaming	—	—	—	Mini album; Two-disc release; 9 tracks
STYX	Released: November 11, 2020; Label: Independent; Formats: CD, Download, Streaming	—	—	—	Two-disc release; Second disc: A.Namnesia EP
Ephemera	Released: December 21, 2021; Label: Independent; Formats: CD, Download, Streaming	—	—	—	Mini album
ZENITH	Released: April 10, 2024; Label: Independent; Formats: CD, Download, Streaming	—	—	—	Two-disc release; Second disc: instrumental versions of the albums' songs

=== Extended Plays ===
Title	Details	Peak positions			Notes
Title	Details	JPN	JPN Comb.	JPN Hot	Notes
Einherjar	Released: December 29, 2018; Label: Independent; Formats: CD, Download, Streaming	—	—	—	
Veiled	Released: March 1, 2020; Label: Independent; Formats: CD, Download, Streaming	—	—	—	Split-EP; featured song: Blancneige
A.Namnesis	Released: November 11, 2020; Label: Independent; Formats: CD, Download, Streaming	—	—	—	Bonus disc for STYX album; Instrumental EP
Reincarnate	Released: November 7, 2023; Label: Independent; Formats: CD, Download, Streaming	—	—	—	Remake versions of previously recorded songs
Anima	Released: June 18, 2025; Label: Independent; Formats: CD, Download, Streaming	—	—	—	

=== Singles ===
List of singles, with selected chart positions, showing year released, certifications and album name
Title	Year	Peaks			Certifications	Album
Title	Year	JPN	JPN Comb.	JPN Hot	Certifications	Album
Lunatic Mirage	2020	—	—	—		STYX
Toge	2021	—	—	—		Ephemera
Naraku no majo	2021	—	—	—		Ephemera
Dawn	2022	—	—	—		ZENITH
Eclipse	2022	—	—	—		ZENITH
Magatsu Yami ni Utau	2023	—	—	—		ZENITH
Zenith	2024	—	—	—		ZENITH
UMBRA	2024	—	—	—		Anima
Lueur Blanche	2025	—	—	—		Anima

== Members ==
Founding members

- Keisuke Kurose: Composing, Arrangements, Producer, Mixing
- Kachiru Ishizue: Illustrations

Studio musicians

- okogeeechann: Vocals
- Hanatan/YURiCa: Vocals
- Kazuya mic: Vocals
- Myu: Guitars
- Kenshiro: Guitars
- Yotu: Keyboards
- Kakeyan: Bass guitar
- Seiichiro Ebisu: Guitars, Bass guitar
