= Kikuo (musician) =

Japanese musician

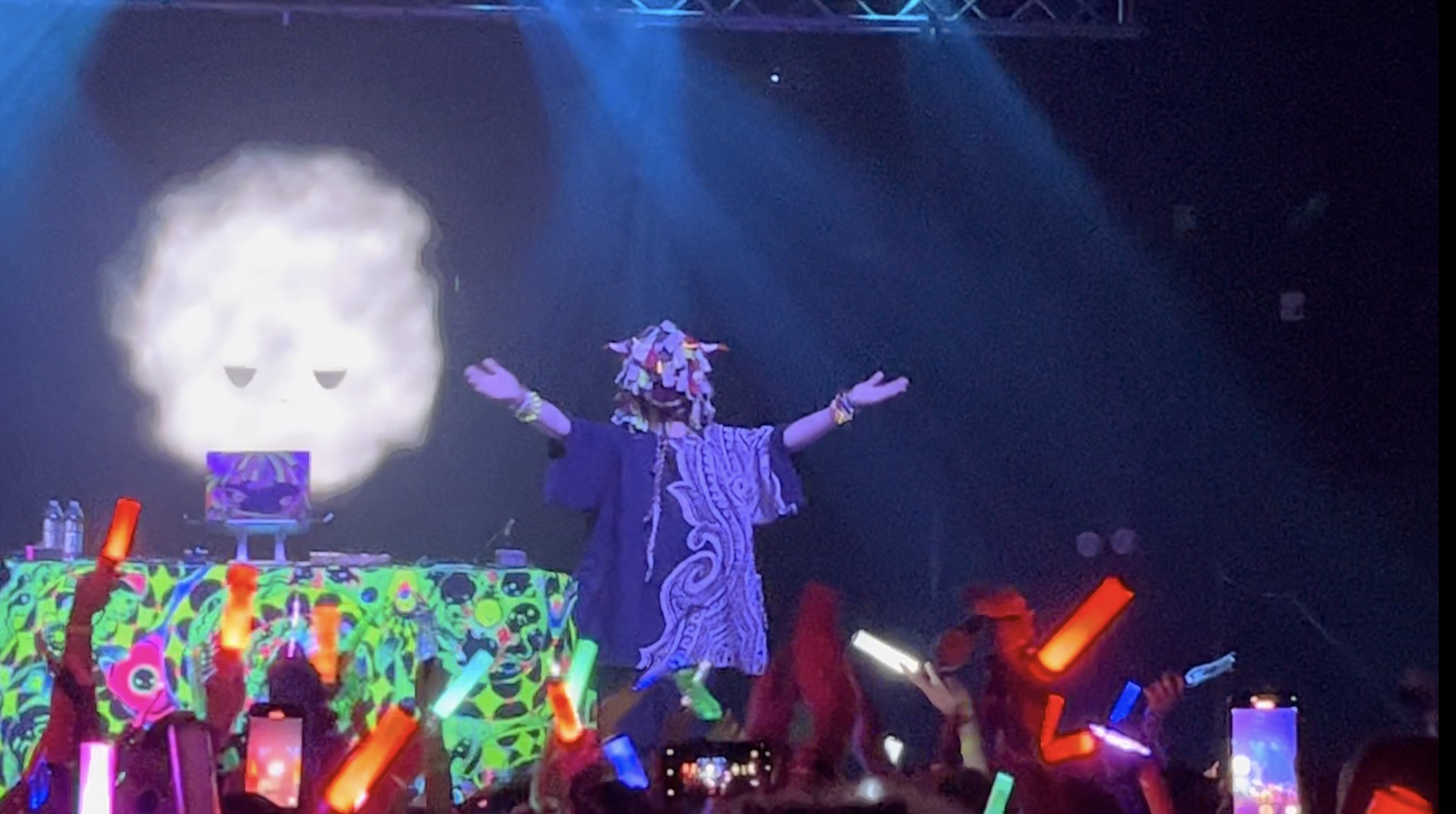
- Kikuo in 2024

Background information
- Born: 1988 (age 37–38); Kanagawa Prefecture, Japan
- Genre: Vocaloid · Doujin music · Indie pop · Avant pop · Art pop · J-pop · Indietronica
- Occupations: Songwriter; producer; DJ
- Years active: 2003–present
- Label: Kikuo Sound Works
- Website: kikuo.jp

YouTube information
- Channel: Kikuo
- Subscribers: 1.67 million
- Views: 567 million
- Last updated: November 7, 2026

Kikuo (Japanese: きくお) is a Japanese songwriter and Vocaloid producer. As an independent artist, he produces the lyrics and music for each of his songs under his own record label, "Kikuo Sound Works," often with vocals provided by popular Crypton Future Media voicebank, Hatsune Miku. His unique style of high-tempo music production utilizes diverse instruments belonging to the folk music of various world cultures, as well as the childlike sounds of toys and toy pianos, to create colorful and upbeat harmonies, often juxtaposed by much darker lyrics.

Additionally, Kikuo is best known for his song, "Love Me, Love Me, Love Me" (愛して愛して愛して, Aishite Aishite Aishite) which surpassed 100 million streams on Spotify in January 2023 and 110 million views on YouTube in July 2025, the first Hatsune Miku song to achieve this feat. Kikuo is also known for his songs "You're a Useless Child" and "I'm Sorry, I'm Sorry".

== Life and career ==
Kikuo was born in 1988. He credits experiences in elementary school for inspiring him to be a creator, recalling how bullies would stop harassing him to take an interest in his creative works, such as "gamebooks," with some even calling him talented and lucky to have such creativity. In a 2023 interview with Japanese web magazine Freezine, Kikuo specifically discussed how bullying shaped his worldview and motivation to create:

Going back a long way, when I was in elementary school I was being bullied, but when I showed them a gamebook that I made by myself, they were like, "You're amazing," and the bullying stopped temporarily when I was playing with the gamebook, but as soon as I took the gamebook away, the bullying started again. From that situation, I realized, "Oh, I can't survive in this society without creativity," and in middle school I thought I had to find something I was good at, anything creative, so I tried a lot of different things, but I couldn't do the things I wasn't good at...There were a lot of things I didn't have, and I got bored very easily, so I got bored of everything, and in the end, the only thing I didn't get bored of was DTM.

Though Kikuo initially used his creativity to evade school bullies, he concluded that creativity would be necessary to survive in society, too. His passion for Desktop Music (DTM) led him to start creating music in 2003, uploading songs to 2channel while still in middle school. Noticing little interest in his early works, bright and flashy pop songs with dance tempos, he investigated the Vocaloid genre. Kikuo told Freezine that songs with more grotesque themes experienced greater success, leading him to make darker pieces himself.

Kikuo published his first Vocaloid song in 2010, followed by his 2011 debut studio album, Kikuo Miku. In 2016, he performed alongside other acts at Dwango's annual Nico Nico Cho Party (Japanese: ニコニコ超パーティー, lit. 'Smiley Super Party') in Saitama Super Arena. Kikuo's work gained popularity, even being featured in the Educational Arts Company high school textbook, "High School Music 1" (Japanese: 高校生の音楽1), as part of a section covering the Vocaloid genre. His song "Six Greetings" was referenced in the textbook along with a lead sheet featuring lyrics and notes from the song. Kikuo was also featured in a documentary by the Japan Broadcasting Corporation (NHK) about Hatsune Miku. As of 2024, Kikuo has created more than a dozen albums and worked with various shows, film projects, games, and other media (see Affiliated works below). His three most streamed songs include:

- "Love Me, Love Me, Love Me" (愛して愛して愛して, Aishite Aishite Aishite)
- "You are a Useless Child" (君はできない子, Kimi wa Dekinai Ko)
- "Dance of the Corpses" (しかばねの踊り, Shikabane no Odori)

The three songs belong to Kikuo's 2013 album Kikuo Miku 3 (Japanese: きくおミク3), and have amassed over 340 million streams collectively on Spotify, as of 2025. "Love Me, Love Me, Love Me" in particular surpassed 100 million streams on Spotify in January 2023, making it the first Vocaloid song to achieve this feat, and most streamed song in the Vocaloid genre as a whole.

== Artistry ==
=== Music production ===
A song titled "Voices of Svaahaa" from the album Kikuo Miku 7.

Kikuo's production process is well documented, having been recorded and highlighted in the 2012 "Miku Creator's Project" on Google+, and also on the online education website, Coloso. He uses a wide range of known and unknown instruments, effects, plugins, vocal synthesizers, and is known for using unorthodox samples such as crushing fruit, wrenches and machinery, squeaks of toys, and even sounds of childhood classrooms to enhance the settings of his songs. Preferring not to use MIDI keyboards to arrange notes, Kikuo points and clicks with a touchpad and mouse. When asked in an interview with Rittor's music magazine, Plug+, about how he chooses sounds to set his music apart he replied, "The philosophy I always follow when choosing sounds is that 'beauty is consistency'...For example, I believe that an orderly arrangement of bricks is more beautiful than a jumble of stones. In music, we feel that something is beautiful when the notes are arranged according to certain rules."

Japanese and Chinese software-voicebanks (colloquially referred to as Vocaloids) provide the main vocals and ad-libs in most Kikuo songs. Recurring Vocaloids used by Kikuo include the popular virtual idol, Hatsune Miku from Crypton Future Media, and Qi Xuan (Mandarin: 绮萱) from Beijing TimeDomain Technology's ACE Virtual Singer (Mandarin: ACE虚拟歌姬). He has also made demo songs for various Vocaloids running on the Vocaloid 3 engine, including Tone Rion (Japanese: 兎眠りおん), IA (Japanese: イア), and Anri Rune (Japanese: 杏梨ルネ) (see Demo songs below). In addition to Vocaloids, Kikuo has also worked with traditional human voices as in the case of his lower-tempo, collaborative album Kikuo feat. si_ku, where his friend and repeat album cover artist, "si_ku", provided vocals.

Kikuo uses Studio One as his preferred DAW with VST plugins for instruments (VSTi) and effects (VSTfx). For VSTi, he is known to use Omnisphere, Kontakt, Massive, and Addictive Drums. For VSTfx, he is known to use Fabfilter, Glitch Machines, Waves Signature Series, Ozone, and Komplete. Additionally, Kikuo acquires samples from Splice and Loopcloud, utilizing the software "Reference4" for acoustic corrections. His hardware preferences include the A7X Active Studio Monitor speaker from ADAM Audio in conjunction with Focal's Clear MG Pro headphones. When asked by Plug+ about an effect he considers best for Vocaloid, Kikuo replied, "It's a pitch shifter. I think there's no point in using detailed and complicated effects because it won't be conveyed anyway. That's why I'm focusing on how to use old-fashioned retro plug-ins dynamically."

=== Lyrical themes ===
Kikuo's lyrics typically explore dark topics. A recurring motif in Kikuo's most popular songs is that of the problem child, accompanied by lyrics which explore themes of suffering, escapism, and trauma. Kikuo often uses bright melodies, audio samples of toys, and the youthful voices of Vocaloids to juxtapose the dark subject matter of his songs.

== Discography ==
=== Albums ===
Kikuo albums (groups included)
English title	Original Japanese title	Romanized	Notes	Artist	Featured artists	Runtime	Song count	Release date (Note: Release Dates may not reflect dates seen on streaming services due to timezone differences, re-releases, or work being moved to services at dates later than initial release.)
NETJEEP	ネットジープ	Netjeep		Kikuo	Kokon Koko	0:15:52	4	April 29, 2007
Bell of Dream	夢の鐘	Yume no Kane	Instrumental	Kikuo		00:22:42	10	December 31, 2009
Kikuo Miku	きくおミク	Kikuo Miku		Kikuo		00:46:37	12	August 13, 2011
KIKUOWORLD	KIKUOWORLD		Instrumental, (stylized in all caps)	Kikuo		00:29:08	11	December 31, 2011
Kikuo Miku 2	きくおミク2	Kikuo Miku 2		Kikuo		00:45:59	12	August 11, 2012
KIKUOWORLD2	KIKUOWORLD2		Instrumental, (stylized in all caps)	Kikuo		00:22:53	7	December 31, 2012
Kikuo Miku 3	きくおミク3	Kikuo Miku 3		Kikuo		00:51:19	12	August 12, 2013
KIKUOWORLD3	KIKUOWORLD3		Instrumental, (stylized in all caps)	Kikuo		00:38:24	1	December 31, 2013
Whereabouts of the Living Being's Soul	いきものの魂のゆくえ	Ikimono no Tamashii no Yukue	Collaborative Album	Kikuo feat. si_ku	si_ku	00:37:28	7	December 31, 2013
Kikuo Miku 0	きくおミク0	Kikuo Miku 0	Pre-Vocaloid songs from 2005 to 2011, special selection of 28 songs from over 1,000	Kikuo	11 artists	01:13:35	28	August 17, 2014
Kikuo Miku 4	きくおミク4	Kikuo Miku 4		Kikuo		01:12:59	15	December 30, 2014
Act I	第一幕	Dai ichi Maku	Collaborative Album	KikuoHana (Japanese: きくおはな)	Hanatan	00:45:39	12	March 30, 2016
Kikuo Live	きくおLive		Live Album from Nico Nico Cho Party	Kikuo		00:27:54	4	August 14, 2016
Act II	第二幕	Dai ni Maku	Collaborative Album	KikuoHana (Japanese: きくおはな)	Hanatan	00:48:09	12	March 31, 2017
Kikuo Miku 5	きくおミク5	Kikuo Miku 5		Kikuo		00:49:54	10	December 29, 2017
Kikuo Miku 6	きくおミク6	Kikuo Miku 6		Kikuo		00:47:47	12	November 6, 2019
Kikuo Miku 7	きくおミク7	Kikuo Miku 7		Kikuo		00:42:02	11	March 21, 2023

=== Singles ===
"My Time OMORI ver. (Kikuo cover)"

Kikuo singles
English title	Japanese title	Romanized	Notes	Artist	Featured artists	Runtime	Song count	Release date
"Voices of Svaahaa"	"ソワカの声"	"Sowaka no Koe"	Promotional for Kikuo Miku 7	Kikuo		00:05:34	1	October 2, 2021
"Astral Travel"	"幽体離脱"	"Yuutai Ridatsu"	Promotional for Kikuo Miku 7	Kikuo		00:05:23	1	March 21, 2022
"Knife, Knife, Knife"	"ナイフ、ナイフ、ナイフ"	"Naifu, Naifu, Naifu"	Promotional for Kikuo Miku 7	Kikuo		00:03:24	1	May 1, 2022
"My Time OMORI ver. (Kikuo cover)"			Collaborative Cover of Bo En's "My Time" from Omori, Promotional for Kikuo Miku 7	Bo En	Kikuo	00:02:46	1	October 19, 2022
"In a Deep, Dark Forest"	"深い森のなかで"	"Fukai Mori no Naka de"	Promotional for Kikuo Miku 7	Kikuo		00:04:57	1	November 24, 2022
"Good Child and the Fox Spirit"	"イイコと妖狐"	"Ii Ko to Youko"	Promotional for Kikuo Miku 7	Kikuo		00:03:53	1	December 31, 2022
"Kara Kara Kara no Kara STuPiD DaNCe ReMiX"	"カラカラカラのカラ STuPiD DaNCe ReMiX"			Kikuo		00:06:37	1	August 23, 2023
"As it is, As it is, Without Change"	"そのまんまそのまんま、そのままずっとそのまま"	"Sono Manma Sono Manma, Sono Mama Zutto Sono Mama"		Kikuo		00:03:44	1	August 28, 2023
"Rainborn Menoko"	"天つ水のメノコ"	"Ama tsu Mizu no Menoko"		Kikuo		00:05:32	1	August 30, 2025

=== Demo songs ===
Demo songs (Promotionals for VOCALOID3)
English title	Japanese title	Romanized	Notes	Artist	Promoted Vocaloid	Runtime	Song count	Release date
"Pokkan Color"	"ぽっかんカラー"	"Pokkan Kara"	Re-released as eighth song on Kikuo Miku 2	Kikuo	Tone Rion (Japanese: 兎眠りおん)	00:03:22	1	January 11, 2012
"Dust Dust Curse"	"塵塵呪詛（チリチリジュソ）"	"Chiri Chiri Juso"	Re-released as seventh song on Kikuo Miku 2	Kikuo	IA (Japanese: イア)	00:03:46	1	January 27, 2012
"Hallelujah Super Idol"	"ハレルヤ・スーパーアイドル"	"Hareruya Suppaa Aidoru"		Kikuo	Anri Rune (Japanese: 杏梨ルネ)	00:03:56	1	June 29, 2013

== Other works ==
=== Minor works ===
Works and side projects unrelated to Kikuo's mainstream discography are found below:

- "Asian Melancholic" is a Kikuo side project debuted in 2015. Compared to other projects, Asian Melancholic's work is eponymously more pensive and low-tempo, often instrumental with minor exceptions. His EP At First was released August 17, 2015 and includes 5 songs with a runtime of 00:17:54.
- "I Want an Older Sister" (Japanese: 僕はお姉さんがほしい) is a manga created by Kikuo in 2013, available on the Japanese art site Pixiv.
- "Kikuostories Aishite Aishite Aishite" (Japanese: Kikuostories 愛して愛して愛して) is a novel written by Kikuo and Ryoji Takamatsu (Japanese: 髙松 良次 文) in 2023, novelizing his two most popular songs, "Love Me, Love Me, Love Me" (愛して愛して愛して, Aishite Aishite Aishite) and "You are a Useless Child" (君はできない子, Kimi wa Dekinai Ko) into a love story and familial tragedy, respectively.

=== Affiliated works ===
In addition to the above works, Kikuo has also supported various media projects including games, TV shows, movies, promotional content for Yamaha's Vocaloids (see Demo songs above), and musical productions by other artists. His roles across these projects include lyricist, composer (writing and arranging), audio master, mixer, etc. Projects where Kikuo is not the focus, and involvement is limited, are listed below:

- Ikitama - Musical group headed by "si_ku" (Kikuo's friend, collaborator, and main artist). Kikuo helped compose and master.
- Kaikai Kitan/Ao no Waltz by Eve - String Arrangement alongside Nene Rio.
- Love Death 555! (Japanese: らぶデス555!) - Composed main theme "Itsudoko!? Love☆Link de Go Go Go!!!" (Japanese: イツドコ！？らぶ☆リンクdeゴーゴーゴー!!!)
- 東方蒼神縁起 a 2012 Touhou fan game - Composed much of soundtrack.
- Chunithm New (2021 Sega arcade game) - Helped compose "Spider's Thread" on the OST.
- Nagi Yanagi's Album Memorandum - Composed and Arranged "Surréalisme"
- Nintendo and Cygames' 2019 Collaborative Album with Daoko for Dragalia Lost: DAOKO × Dragalia Lost - Composed and Arranged three songs across two discs.
- Just Wanna xxxxx With You (Japanese: キミと××××したいだけ) by Phantom Siita - Composed and Lyricised by Kikuo.

== Tours ==
In an interview with Plug+, Kikuo explained his motivation for touring overseas, "I knew I had fans all over the world, so I thought 'I can do it' [laughs]. I don't think a Vocaloid producer has ever performed overseas, so I wanted to do something unknown that no one has ever done before."

=== Concert tours ===
- Kikuoland-Go-Round World Tour (2024–2025)
- Kikuoland: Above All Bounds World Tour (2026)

== See also ==
- Vocaloid
- Bo En
- Doujin Music
