= Uroboros (band) =

Japanese rock band

- Origin: Japan
- Genres: Rock
- Years active: 2015 – 2016
- Label: Pony Canyon
- Members: Kurose Keisuke; Kamiki Aya; Takayoshi Ohmura; Nakamura Taizo; Sasabuchi Hiroshi
- Website: urbrs.com

Uroboros (ウロボロス, Uroborosu) is a Japanese visual kei rock band formed in 2015 signed to Pony Canyon. They made their debut single "Black Swallowtail" as the second opening for the anime television series Rokka: Braves of the Six Flowers, and also their debut mini album Another Ark.

== Members ==
- Kurose Keisuke (黒瀬圭亮) – Composer (Asriel (band))
- Kamiki Aya (上木彩矢) – Vocals
- Takayoshi Ohmura (大村孝佳) – Guitar
- Nakamura Taizo (中村泰造) – Bass
- Sasabuchi Hiroshi (笹渕啓史) – Drums _{(ex-Plastic Tree)}

== Discography ==
Mini albums

- Another Ark (2015)
- Zodiac (2016)

Singles

- "Black Swallowtail" (2015)
