= Takayoshi Ohmura =

Japanese musician (born 1983)

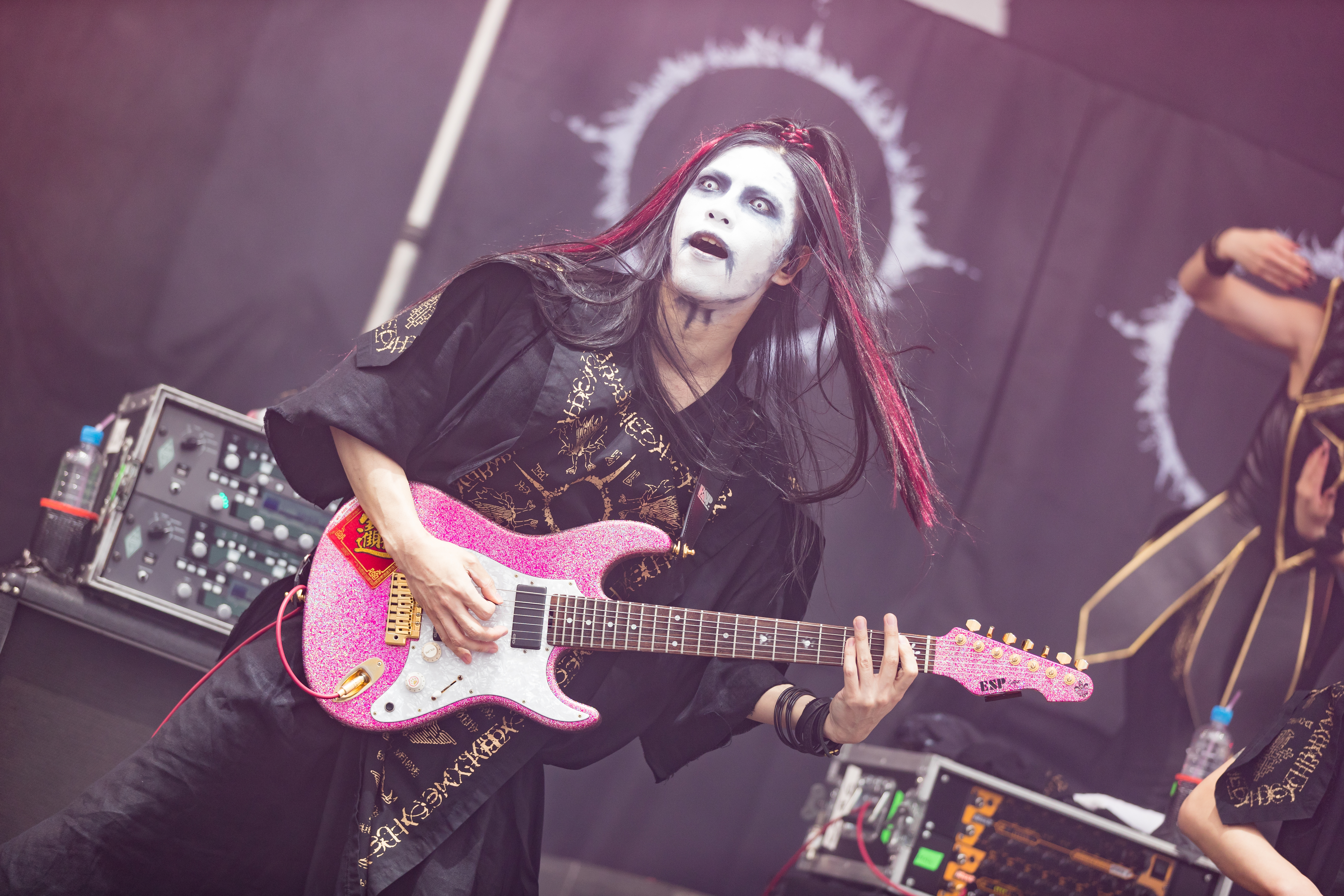
- Ohmura performing with Babymetal at Rock am Ring 2018

Background information
- Born: 26 December 1983 (age 42); Osaka Prefecture, Japan
- Genres: Instrumental rock; heavy metal; neoclassical metal
- Occupation: Musician
- Instruments: Piano; guitar
- Years active: 2003–present
- Label: Pony Canyon
- Formerly of: Cross Hard; Gloria; Uroboros
- Website: takayoshi-ohmura.jp

Takayoshi Ohmura (Japanese: 大村孝佳, Hepburn: Ōmura Takayoshi; born 26 December 1983) is a Japanese musician and songwriter. In 2004, he released the album Nowhere to Go, which included contributions from Richie Kotzen, Mark Boals, and Doogie White.

In 2005, Ohmura formed the band Cross Hard and issued the album Eclipse from East. In 2006, along with Cross Hard's bassist, Kaoru, he formed Gloria, releasing the albums MOTIF (2008) and Acrobatic Road (2009). Between 2015 and 2016, he was a member of Uroboros.

== Discography ==
=== Solo ===
- Nowhere to Go (2004)
- Power of Reality (2006)
- Emotions in Motion (2007)
- Devils in the Dark (2012)
- Devils in the Dark: Final Edition (2014)
- Cerberus (2017)
- I.RI.S (2019)
- Angels in the Dark (2020)

=== with other artists ===
- Eclipse from East (with Cross Hard) (2005)
- MOTIF (with Gloria) (2008)
- Acrobatic Road (with Gloria) (2009)
- V.A. – SOUND HOLIC – Metallical Astronomy (2010)
- BlazBlue Song Accord 1 with Continuum Shift (video game, with A.S.H) (2010)
- BlazBlue Song Accord 2 with Continuum Shift (video game, with A.S.H) (2011)
- Hard Corps: Uprising (video game) (2011)
- Alter War in Tokyo (with Date Course Pentagon Royal Garden) (2011)
