= Hanatan =

Japanese singer

Hanatan (花たん; Stylized as HaNaTan) (born January 18, 1986, in Nagoya, Aichi) is a Japanese video creator, utaite and doujin vocalist. Her second moniker is YURiCa (ユリカ) which she usually uses working on collaboration albums.

Seven of her released albums managed to enter the Japanese music charts.

== Career ==
Hanatan started her musical career in 2008 when she began to upload her cover versions of well-known Japanese songs on Nico Nico Douga and YouTube. Within the utaite scene she is known for her wide vocal range. Songs released by Hanatan feature musical elements from hard rock and "candy" pop but she has also released various dance remixes.

Between 2011 and 2016 she released seven studio albums which were able to enter the official Japanese music charts by Oricon. In 2016, she and Japanese musician Kikuo started a musical project called Kikuohana and released the first collaborative album on March 30, 2016. A second album was published on March 31 the following year.

In 2018, she was one of 25 utaite singers who performed in front of 5,000 attendees at Chang-Gero Sonic in Tokyo. Hanatan performed the opening theme song Arc-en-Ciel for fantasy anime series The Magical Revolution of the Reincarnated Princess and the Genius Young Lady as well as the ending theme song for The Do-Over Damsel Conquers the Dragon Emperor. She performed guest vocals for the song UMBRA by Japanese dojin music circle ELFENSJóN which was used as third ending theme song from the ninth to twelfth episode of the fantasy anime series Why Does Nobody Remember Me in This World?. Prior to her involvement in the creation of UMBRA she worked with the project as a guest vocalist on the albums Ephemera and Zenith as well on the remake EP Reincarnate.

On 14 January 2022, Hanatan debuted as a VTuber in order to widen the scope of her activities since she had not publicly showed her face before.

== Music ==
In her music, Hanatan often uses the flower language such as in naming her albums after flowers like her album EriCa which was named after the same-named botanic name. Several music albums were produced in collaboration with various Vocaloid producers. On her 2015's album Flower Rail involved Vocaloid producers included Darvish P, 40mP, Marasy and buzzG. On the same album, voice actor Hiroyuki Yoshino was featured guest vocals. Hanatan described herself as a fan of Yoshino.

In a 2017 interview with the German-language Rock Hard magazine, American rock guitarist Doug Aldrich stated that his publisher contacted him with a request to write some songs for Hanatan, which he described were "similar to Lady Gaga."

== Discography ==
=== Comiket releases ===
- 2010: Colorful Flower (sold at Comiket 78)
- 2011: Summer Syrup (sold at Comiket 80)
- 2011: Blooming Garden (sold at Comiket 81)
- 2011: Nostalgia (sold at Comiket 81)
- 2012: Dirndl.Frau (sold at Comiket 82)
- 2012: Sweets (with HanaPoko, sold at Comiket 82)
- 2012: Byakku Sengaku (sold at Comiket 83)
- 2014: Flowers Best (sold at Comiket 86)
- 2014: HANA YOHO Best (sold at Comiket 86)
- 2014: Hoshi Hana (sold at Comiket 87)
- 2014: Chers petits chats (sold at Comiket 87)
- 2014: Koi no Saki Saki☆Revolution desu you♪ (sold at Comiket 87)
- 2015: Circus★Circus (sold at 88)
- 2015: Kinou mo, Kyou mo, Ashita Kara mo (sold at Comiket 88)
- 2017: Hana ame -Hana furu- (sold at Comiket 92)
- 2017: Akane (sold at Comiket 92)
- 2017: CrazyFlowerBEST (sold at Comiket 92)
- 2017: Hiragi (sold at Comiket 93)
- 2017: Hana no Utage (sold at Comiket 93)
- 2018: Ouka (sold at Comiket 94)
- 2018: Aoi (sold at Comiket 94)
- 2018: Maple (sold at Comiket 95)
- 2018: Hanapoko Rococo (with HanaPoko, sold at Comiket 95)
- 2018: Story Has Ended (sold at Comiket 95)
- 2019: Enju (sold at Comiket 96)
- 2019: Hanapoko Acoustic 2019 (with HanaPoko, sold at Comiket 96)
- 2019: Just Flowering (sold at Comiket 96)
- 2019: Ran (sold at Comiket 97)

=== Doujin albums ===
- 2011: Akiba Koubou presents Uttatemita collection Hanatan (EP)
- 2011: Flower Drops (Album); Japan: #32
- 2014: Mahou Shoujo 28 (Album); Japan: #139
- 2016: Daiichimaku: Kaien (Album)
- 2016: ERiCa Special Studio Live Session (Amatsu Kitsune) (Live)
- 2017: Dai ni Maku (Album)

=== Major albums ===
- 2013: Primrose Flower Voice (Album); Japan: #35
- 2013: Flower (Album); Japan: #40
- 2014: The Flower of Dim World (Album); Japan: #53
- 2015: Flower Rail (Album); Japan: #35
- 2016: ERiCa (Album); Japan: #49

=== Kikuohana albums ===
- 2016: Act I
- 2017: Act II

=== Musical involvement ===
- 2012: Guest vocals on the album Rockman Holic ~The 25th Anniversary~ by SOUND HOLIC
- 2021: Guest vocals on the album Ephemara by ELFENSJóN
- 2023: Guest vocals on the remake EP Reincarnate by ELFENSJóN
- 2024: Guest vocals on the album Zenith by ELFENSJóN
