= Rokka: Braves of the Six Flowers =

Japanese light novel and its adaptations

- First light novel volume cover featuring Fremy Speeddraw

六花の勇者 (Rokka no Yūsha)
- Genre: Action, fantasy, mystery
- Light novel
- Written by: Ishio Yamagata
- Illustrated by: Miyagi
- Published by: Shueisha
- English publisher: NA: Yen Press
- Imprint: Super Dash Bunko; Dash X Bunko
- Original run: August 25, 2011 – July 24, 2015 (on hiatus)
- Volumes: 6 + 1 spin-off
- Manga
- Written by: Ishio Yamagata
- Illustrated by: Kei Toru
- Published by: Shueisha
- English publisher: NA: Yen Press
- Magazine: Super Dash & Go!
- Original run: February 25, 2012 – November 20, 2014
- Volumes: 4
- Anime television series
- Directed by: Takeo Takahashi
- Written by: Tatsuhiko Urahata
- Music by: Michiru Ōshima
- Studio: Passione
- Licensed by: NA: Ponycan USA; UK: Anime Limited
- Original network: MBS, AT-X, Tokyo MX, BS11
- English network: SEA: Aniplus Asia
- Original run: July 4, 2015 – September 19, 2015
- Episodes: 12
- icon

Rokka: Braves of the Six Flowers (六花の勇者, Rokka no Yūsha; lit. "Heroes of the Six Flowers") is a Japanese light novel series written by Ishio Yamagata, with illustrations by Miyagi. Shueisha has published six volumes since August 2011. A manga adaptation by Kei Toru began serialization in Shueisha's Super Dash & Go! magazine in February 2012. Both the light novels and their manga adaptation are licensed in North America by Yen Press. An anime television series produced by Passione and directed by Takeo Takahashi aired in Japan from July 4 to September 19, 2015.

== Plot ==
Six people called the Braves of the Six Flowers are chosen by the Goddess of Fate to defeat the Demon God (魔神, Majin). However, when they gather, there are seven heroes present, leading them to believe that one is an impostor and on the side of the Demon God. The landscape, architecture, and written language portrayed is very similar to Mesoamerican Maya or Aztec peoples.

== Characters ==
=== Braves ===
Adlet Mayer (Note: "Adlet Mayer" in the manga, "Adlet Myer" in the anime) (アドレット・マイア, Adoretto Maia)
Voiced by: Soma Saito, Miyuki Sawashiro (young) (Japanese); Robbie Daymond (English)
The main protagonist. He is the self-proclaimed strongest man in the world. He fights using tools and trickery to catch his opponent off-guard. Tgurneu appeared at his village when he was a child and destroyed it while capturing all the villagers except Adlet. His reason for wanting to become a Brave is revenge. Since he could not become a Saint (only women can become Saints) he went and found Atro Spiker, a hermit adept in various fighting styles and in science.
Nashetania Loei Piena Augustra (Note: "Nashetania Loei Piena Augustra" in the manga, "Nachetanya Loei Piena Augustra" in the anime) (ナッシェタニア・ルーイ・ピエナ・アウグストラ, Nasshetania Rūi Piena Augusutora)
Voiced by: Yoko Hikasa (Japanese); Abby Trott (English)
The first crowned princess of Piena and the Saint of Blades. She can make blades appear out of nothing to use as projectiles. Her family was killed during a civil war in Piena.
Fremy Speeddraw (Note: "Fremy Speeddraw" in the manga, "Flamie Speeddraw" in the anime) (フレミー・スピッドロウ, Furemī Supiddorō)
Voiced by: Aoi Yūki (Japanese); Brianna Knickerbocker (English)
A sniper known as the Six Flower Killer (Brave-Killer in the anime) and the Saint of Gunpowder. She is a half-fiend who was betrayed by her mother and tribe after failing to kill Chamo, so she goes to kill the Demon God in revenge. She can create bullets and other explosives out of thin air. She loves dogs and hates humans, though it appears she has feelings for Adlet despite her denying it. Thanks to Adlet she was willing to accept the rest of the Braves as her comrades and they accepted her as well.
Hans Humpty (ハンス・ハンプティ, Hansu Hanputi)
Voiced by: Kenichi Suzumura (Japanese); Ben Diskin (English)
A strange assassin man who mimics a cat as he talks, as well as their movement. He fences with an unworldly and peculiar skill. He is the only one who believes that the Seventh is unaware of his own status, and suspects that Adlet is the Seventh. He is the first to find out that Adlet is not the Seventh (via using his assassin techniques) and does everything in his power to prove his innocence.
Mora Chester (Note: "Mora Chester" in the manga, "Maura Chester" in the anime) (モーラ・チェスター, Mōra Chesutā)
Voiced by: Rina Satō (Japanese); Wendee Lee (English)
An extremely serious and intellectual woman. She serves as the leader of the Saints and is the Saint of Mountains. She initially suspected Adlet was the seventh even going so far as framing him for the crime of attacking Hans, which never actually happened. She is the only person Chamo will listen to.
Chamo Rosso (Note: "Chamo Rosso" in the manga, "Chamot Rosso" in the anime) (チャモ・ロッソ, Chamo Rosso)
Voiced by: Ai Kakuma (Japanese); Kira Buckland (English)
A proud little girl who is called the most powerful warrior of the current age. She is the Saint of Swamps. Every kyōma she has ever eaten lives in the swamp within her stomach. She vomits every time she uses them as weapons. She carries a small foxtail grass to help her do this. While she is powerful she often doesn't listen to others and will act on her own as she pleases.
Goldof Auora (Note: "Goldof Auora" in the manga, "Goldov Auora" in the anime) (ゴルドフ・アウオーラ, Gorudofu Auōra)
Voiced by: Koki Uchiyama (Japanese); Ray Chase (English)
A young knight completely devoted to Nashetania, he wields a giant spear. He was tasked to find the Six Flower Killer. He is jealous of Adlet's closeness to the Princess. Having been saved by Nashetania when he was little, he swore to protect her ever since.
Rolonia Manchetta (ロロニア・マンチェッタ, Roronia Manchetta)
Voiced by: Hisako Kanemoto (Japanese); Jennie Kwan (English)
A short girl who wears cow-themed armor and glasses. She is the Saint of Fresh Blood and a childhood friend of Adlet and is adept at healing magic. She arrived at the end of the first volume (episode 12 of the anime), bringing the number of the Braves back to seven. She was initially just a servant who washed clothes at the temple of the God of Fresh Blood. When the Saint before her died, she was chosen by the God rather than all the acolytes present. She wields a whip in battle that is filled with her blood. This allows her to control it completely and one scratch can force the blood out of any opponent it touches.

=== Kyōma ===
Tgurneu (テグネウ, Teguneu)
Voiced by: Akira Ishida
One of the three kyōma (Note: "kyōma" in the manga, "fiends" in the anime) leaders. He is very manipulative and loves to read poems. He believes that 'love' is the ultimate weapon.
Cargikk (カーグイック, Kāguikku)
One of the three kyōma leaders. He takes the form of a lion and treats his fellow kyōma as his children.
Dozzu (ドズー, Dozū)
One of the three kyōma leaders. He takes the form of a dog and can control lightning.

== Media ==
=== Light novels ===
Rokka no Yūsha began as a light novel series written by Ishio Yamagata, with illustrations by Miyagi. Shueisha published the first novel on August 25, 2011, under their Super Dash Bunko imprint. With the introduction of Dash X Bunko on November 11, 2014, the fifth volume of the light novel was released. Six volumes have been released as of July 24, 2015. North American publisher Yen Press announced their license to the series at Anime Expo 2016. A spin-off volume titled Rokka no Yūsha Archive 1: Don't pray to the flower was released on March 25, 2016.

No.	Original release date	Original ISBN	English release date	English ISBN
1	August 25, 2011	978-4-08-630633-1	April 18, 2017	978-0-316-50141-5
2	April 25, 2012	978-4-08-630671-3	August 22, 2017	978-0-316-55619-4
3	November 22, 2012	978-4-08-630710-9	December 12, 2017	978-0-316-55620-0
4	July 25, 2013	978-4-08-630745-1	April 24, 2018	978-0-316-55622-4
5	November 21, 2014	978-4-08-631008-6	August 21, 2018	978-0-316-55623-1
6	July 24, 2015	978-4-08-631056-7	December 11, 2018	978-0-316-55624-8
Archive 1	March 25, 2016	978-4-08-631105-2	—	—

=== Manga ===
A manga adaptation, illustrated by Kei Toru, began serialization in Shueisha's Super Dash & Go! with the April 2012 issue sold on February 25. After the magazine ended its publication in print in April 2013, the manga continued serialization online until November 20, 2014. Four tankōbon volumes were published from October 25, 2012 to July 24, 2015. Yen Press announced their license to the manga adaptation at Anime Expo 2016 and released all volumes in 2017.

No.	Original release date	Original ISBN	English release date	English ISBN
1	October 25, 2012	978-4-08-782468-1	January 24, 2017	978-0-316-50142-2
2	July 25, 2013	978-4-08-782656-2	May 23, 2017	978-0-316-55625-5
3	November 21, 2014	978-4-08-782798-9	August 22, 2017	978-0-316-55626-2
4	July 24, 2015	978-4-08-782853-5	November 14, 2017	978-0-316-55627-9

=== Anime ===
An anime television series adaptation of the first novel volume, produced by Passione and directed by Takeo Takahashi aired from July 4 to September 19, 2015. The series is licensed in North America by Ponycan USA and by Anime Limited in the UK. Five pieces of theme music were used for the episodes: two opening themes and three ending themes. From episodes 1-4 and 12, "Cry for the Truth" was used as the first opening theme, and from episodes 1–3, 8 and 12, "Secret Sky" was used as the first ending theme, both performed by Michi. The second opening theme "Black Swallowtail" by Uroboros was used from episodes 5–11, and the second ending theme used from episodes 4-5 and 10 is "Dance in the Fake" by Yoko Hikasa. From episodes 6–7, 9 and 11, "Nameless Heart" by Aoi Yūki was used as the third ending theme.

No.	Title	Original release date
1	"The Strongest Man in the World" "Chijō Saikyō no Otoko" (地上最強の男)	July 4, 2015
In the Kingdom of Piena, a mysterious man named Adlet Myer, proclaiming himself to be the strongest man in the world, interrupts the ritual tournament semifinals between two warriors, Batoal Rainhawk of the west and Quato Gain of the east. After easily incapacitating Batoal and Quato with tricks up his sleeve, Adlet is soon confined in a jail cell. Adlet is later found by Nachetanya Loei Piena Augustra, who briefly explains the history of the Braves of the Six Flowers, six warriors chosen by the Goddess of Fate to fight against and defeat the Demon God, dating back three generations. Nachetanya then learns that Adlet dreams of becoming a Brave for revenge. After being sentenced to indefinite imprisonment deep underground, Adlet is eventually chosen to become a Brave, bearing the Crest of Six Flowers on his right hand. Nachetanya introduces herself as the crowned princess of the Kingdom of Piena and the current Saint of Blades before releasing Adlet from prison. Adlet and Nachetanya then leave the Kingdom of Piena on horseback and make their way west, where they plan to reach the Wailing Demon Territory, a peninsula where the other four Braves will gather.
2	"First Journey" "Hajimete no Tabi" (初めての旅)	July 11, 2015
After Adlet retrieves a case from his secret hideout, he and Nachetanya continue their first journey to an orchard in Fandyne. Nachetanya showcases her godlike abilities by conjuring blades used as projectiles, but Adlet gets upset when Nachetanya playfully attacks him. As they camp out for the night, Nachetanya reveals that her corrupt father caused a civil war six years ago, long before she was chosen as the Saint of Blades and the crowned princess of the Kingdom of Piena. The next day, Nachetanya recalls that she sent away her personal knight Goldov Auora six months ago to find a so-called Brave-Killer. Having traveled for ten days, Adlet and Nachetanya finally reach Gwenbyer, known as the Country of Iron Hills. They soon defeat a group of fiends that have been terrorizing a nearby village. Adlet goes inside the village and encounters Flamie Speeddraw, a sniper who is the Saint of Gunpowder. Flamie uses her abilities to conjure a bullet as she aims her rifle at Adlet. Meanwhile, Goldov finally returns to Nachetanya, informing her that Flamie is the Brave-Killer.
3	"The Girl Who Kills Braves" "Rokka-goroshi no Shōjo" (六花殺しの少女)	July 18, 2015
Flamie urges Adlet to leave her alone, stating that she must fight against and defeat the Demon God by herself. Before chasing after Flamie into the woods, Adlet sends off his horse to give a message to Nachetanya. Catching up to Flamie near a creek, Adlet manages to steal her fanny pack full of bullets and gunpowder, using it as collateral for traveling with him to the Wailing Demon Territory. As Nachetanya and Goldov fight off more fiends in the village, Nachetanya receives the message written by Adlet, telling her to go on ahead towards the Wailing Demon Territory without him. As they continue traveling, Adlet repeatedly tries to prove himself to Flamie as an ally. Adlet and Flamie eventually reach a red fortress, where a male private named Lauren welcomes them inside while noting that the other Braves passed by two days ago. Lauren tells them about the Phantasmal Barrier, which can only be activated at a nearby temple in order to seal off the entrance to the Wailing Demon Territory and ward off the fiends. While walking through a valley towards the temple, Adlet and Flamie are suddenly attacked by Nachetanya and Goldov.
4	"The Heroes Gather" "Yūsha Shūketsu" (勇者集結)	July 25, 2015
Adlet proves that Flamie bears the Crest of Six Flowers on her left hand. As Nachetanya tells Adlet that Flamie is indeed the Brave-Killer, Flamie admits to honoring her moniker. Believing that Flamie now desires to slay the Demon God, Adlet eventually convinces Nachetanya and Goldov to accept Flamie as their ally. The four of them later spot a large group of fiends in the forest, blocking their path towards the temple. Nachetanya, Flamie and Goldov deal with the fiends, while Adlet runs on ahead to the temple. Upon arriving at the temple, Adlet crosses paths with a monkey fiend disguised as a woman before detonating the entrance to the temple and attacking hollow guards in suits of armor. Adlet then learns that the Phantasmal Barrier has already been activated. Nachetanya, Flamie and Goldov also arrive, realizing that they have been sealed off from exiting the Phantasmal Barrier. With no way of deactivating the Phantasmal Barrier, the four are soon met by three other Braves named Chamot Rosso, Maura Chester and Hans Humpty. As the seven of them face each other in confusion, they deduce that one of them must be an impostor and therefore an enemy.
5	"The Seventh Brave" "Nana Ninme no Yūsha" (七人目の勇者)	August 1, 2015
Flamie ends up shackled, initially being blamed as the one who activated the Phantasmal Barrier and therefore the impostor. Maura suggests that the seven of them should formally introduce themselves and retell the events leading up to the temple. After Adlet, Nachetanya and Goldov formally introduce themselves, Maura reveals that she is the Saint of Mountains and the appointed leader of the Saints. Chamot reveals that she is the Saint of Swamps, while Hans reveals that he is employed as an assassin, mimicking the movements and sounds of a cat. Flamie then explains that she is a half-fiend, born from her late human father Meria Speeddraw and her betraying fiend mother. Hans debunks the suspicion of Flamie being the impostor since she had many chances to kill Adlet before reaching the temple. Adlet notes that the Phantasmal Barrier was already activated when he saw that a sword was already placed inside the altar on the dais, though Hans believes this to be a locked-room mystery since the Phantasmal Barrier would have been activated around the time when Adlet detonated the entrance to the temple. This makes Adlet the prime suspect of being the impostor.
6	"A Trap and a Rout" "Wana to Kaisō" (罠と潰走)	August 8, 2015
Adlet tries to testify against the accusation of him being the impostor, theorizing that an eighth Brave must have escaped shortly after the Phantasmal Barrier was activated. When Goldov attempts to slash Adlet with a sword, Adlet drops a flash bomb onto the ground and temporarily sedates Flamie with a poison needle. As Adlet makes his escape with Flamie in tow, Hans severely wounds Adlet by flinging a dagger into his back. Adlet carries Flamie deep into the forest before falling unconscious next to her. In the past, Adlet lived in a small village named Hasuna in the country of Aurora, where he had a best friend named Rainer Milan and an adoptive sister named Shetla Myer. Adlet begged an old man named Atro Spiker to teach him how to be the strongest man in the world, so his first lesson was to ultimately smile in despair. In the present, Adlet regains consciousness, noticing that Flamie patched up his back. As they camp out for the night, Adlet conspires that the seventh and eighth Braves would be in cahoots with the fiends. Adlet smiles in despair as he is determined to find out who the eighth Brave might be.
7	"The Reason of the Two" "Futari no Riyū" (二人の理由)	August 15, 2015
Flamie learns more about Adlet's past. Adlet was taught the secrets behind self-defense and the science behind weaponry by his master Atro. However, a humanoid fiend named Tgurneu, whose body parts are composed of different creatures, soon terrorized Hasuna. Flamie confirms that her mother was convinced by Tgurneu to birth and breed Flamie as a half-fiend. Adlet recalls that Rainer and Shetla both gave their lives and left him as the sole surviving villager. Flamie reveals that she was betrayed and abandoned by her mother after she failed to kill Chamot in the past, leading Adlet to empathize with Flamie. Before Flamie heads back to the temple, she gives Adlet an explosive used as a signaling device when it is activated. The next day, Flamie reveals her past to Nachetanya, Hans, Maura, Chamot and Goldov. They devise a plan to divide and conquer Adlet in the forest. Hans stays at the temple, while Chamot goes alone, Nachetanya goes with Goldov and Flamie goes with Maura. Nachetanya tells Goldov that she suspects Hans of being the seventh Brave. Adlet swiftly makes his way back to the temple, but he ends up confronting Hans.
8	"The Average Man and the Genius" "Bonjin to Tensai" (凡人と天才)	August 22, 2015
Hans pounces on Adlet while wielding two Bowie knives and interrogates him about possibly being the seventh Brave. Adlet escapes by releasing tear gas on Hans, who then follows Adlet into the forest. Discarding his secret weapons to seemingly ensure a fair fight, Adlet ejects the blade of his modified short sword at Hans, though Adlet intentionally aimed at a tree behind Hans to clear his name. Hans falsely proclaims himself as the seventh Brave and creates a mere hallucination of slitting Adlet's throat. Seeing how Adlet reacted from potentially losing his life, this finally convinces Hans that Adlet is not an impostor. Maura tells a reluctant Flamie that they must kill Adlet if they find him, while Nachetanya tells a jealous Goldov that they need to protect Adlet if they find him. Adlet and Hans return to the temple in order to find some clues. As they go back outside, they encounter Chamot, who summons a horde of Jyuma, water fiends that live inside Chamot's stomach, by gagging on a small foxtail grass to induce vomit. Adlet and Hans find themselves surrounded by the Jyuma, which are capable of regeneration.
9	"Blossoms of Doubt" "Giwaku no Tsubomi" (疑惑の蕾)	August 29, 2015
After using his flammable bottles to fend off the Jyuma, Adlet helps Hans to defeat and capture Chamot. At the temple, Adlet asks Chamot if she knows anything about activating the Phantasmal Barrier, but she shakes her head. Although Hans believes that Flamie sees everyone as an enemy, Adlet still detonates the signaling device to summon Flamie in the forest. Elsewhere, Nachetanya tells Goldov that Hans was already aware that she was a crowned princess prior to being formally introduced. Near a pond, Adlet explains that Lauren could be in cahoots with the seventh Brave, who may have created the fog to trick everyone into blaming Adlet for activating the Phantasmal Barrier and encouraging a locked-room mystery. Back at the temple, Hans explains the same thing to Maura and Chamot. Flamie rebukes this hypothesis, seeing as there are numerous stakes buried around the temple which are used to summon the fog. Maura still believes that Adlet is playing mind games with the rest of them. As Adlet vows to protect Flamie, she urges him to stay by her side. Based on the Crest of Six Flowers that Nachetanya bears on her chest, Goldov confirms that Adlet is still alive.
10	"Desperate Situation" "Zettai Zetsumei" (絶体絶命)	September 5, 2015
When Adlet genuinely confesses his feelings for Flamie, she threatens to shoot him after thinking that he is deceiving her. After leaving Chamot to watch over Hans, Maura uses her ability of long-range communication with an echoing voice, falsely explaining to Flamie as well as Nachetanya and Goldov that Hans was nearly killed by Adlet. Goldov is caught off guard when Nachetanya snaps into complete madness. While pursuing Adlet in the forest, Flamie refuses to believe that Adlet is innocent. Maura suddenly arrives and engages in battle against Adlet, who then drops a smoke bomb to avoid a fatal blow. As Flamie then realizes that Adlet wants to surrender, she prevents Maura from attacking him any further. Adlet tries to convince Maura that Flamie is innocent. He previously sprayed the altar with a syringe that emits a chemical to detect the presence of a fiend, proving that there was no trace of Flamie activating the Phantasmal Barrier. Flamie instinctively thwarts an angry Maura from killing Adlet. As they try to escape, Adlet and Flamie are then cornered by Nachetanya and Goldov.
11	"Counterattack" "Hankō" (反攻)	September 12, 2015
In an intense matchup, Flamie is momentarily overpowered by Goldov and Maura, while Adlet is eventually incapacitated by Nachetanya. However, Adlet riskily uses his hands to prevent Nachetanya from stabbing him in the chest. He flips her over the shoulder and kicks her down a slope to make his escape. Goldov follows Adlet and brutally beats him in the area of the forest where the large group of fiends were killed. As Nachetanya and Maura soon arrive with Flamie temporarily being held captive, Nachetanya is shocked when an uninjured Hans also arrives with Chamot. Maura apologizes for lying about Adlet being the impostor. Based on how fog is scientifically created, Adlet concludes that the impostor kidnapped Riura, the Saint of the Sun, and forced her to raise the atmospheric temperature for over a week. When Adlet detonated the entrance to the temple, the fiends killed Riura, dropping the atmospheric temperature to create the fog, as to which the fiends activated the Phantasmal Barrier to cause confusion amongst the Braves. Hans locates the corpse of Riura inside a dead white horse fiend, leaving one possible suspect among the seven Braves as the impostor, perhaps Maura.
12	"The Time to Reveal the Answer" "Kaimei no Toki" (解明の時)	September 19, 2015
Hans and Chamot previously found two stone tablets and a sword buried under the floor of the temple. Based on the instructions from the second stone tablet on how to reactivate the Phantasmal Barrier, it is recalled that Goldov removed the sword from the altar, Adlet dripped blood down the sword and recited the incantation, while Nachetanya destroyed the stone tablet. After Adlet realizes that Nachetanya was the one who sent him to the temple alone in order to fall for the trap orchestrated from the get-go, Nachetanya finally surrenders and shockingly admits to everyone that she is the impostor. Nachetanya had planned to kill all the Braves so that humans and fiends could live in harmony, but 500,000 humans would suffer casualties to achieve this. Adlet then orders Flamie, Hans, Maura, Chamot and Goldov to kill Nachetanya, but she vanishes into thin air and leaves a scent of rotting apples. When Hans, Maura, Chamot and Goldov return to the temple, Flamie stays behind to watch over Adlet, who briefly passes out from blood loss. Adlet regains consciousness back at the temple, where he has been patched up by Maura. With the Phantasmal Barrier now deactivated, Adlet, Flamie, Hans, Maura, Chamot and Goldov surprisingly encounter Rolonia Manchetta, the Saint of Fresh Blood and a childhood friend of Adlet. Rolonia apologizes for being late due to the fog and claims to be one of the Braves. Amidst the confusion, Doltom III, the king of Gwenbyer, arrives at the temple and informs the Braves that 2,000 fiends will gather towards the Wailing Demon Territory. After Adlet orders Doltom III to reactivate the Phantasmal Barrier, the seven Braves set out to slay the Demon God.

== Reception ==
Stig Høgset from THEM Anime Reviews was intrigued by the overall mystery throughout the show, but felt it dragged viewers along with constant accusations towards the same character, "inconsistent" animation and underutilizing its Youma sentients.
