= Tone Rion =

Voice synthesizer software

- Developers: Dear Stage (Moe Japan, Co. Ltd.); Yamaha Corporation
- Release: December 16, 2011
- Stable release: Vocaloid 4 / February 16, 2017
- Operating system: Microsoft Windows macOS
- Available in: Japanese
- Type: Voice Synthesizer Software
- License: Proprietary
- Website: Official Website

Tone Rion (兎眠りおん) is a Vocaloid 3 vocal. Her sampled voice was provided by the now retired Japanese singer Yumemi Nemu.

== Development ==
She was first seen silhouetted on October 14, 2011 and was revealed in a poster on October 21. Later during the Vocanama event, more of her official art, her demo and her website was revealed, along with her Twitter. Her release date was the 16th of December in 2011.

The original version of Tone Rion was discontinued from sale on August 20, 2013 and was re-released as "Tone Rion SE".

In May 2015, it became possible to install Tone Rion onto the Mac OS x.

On February 16, 2017, Tone Rion received a Vocaloid 4 update. Tone Rion SE was discontinued.

== Characteristics ==
Her brief back-story states that she is 16, and was born in the year 2095. Rion performs on the Dear Stage (ディアステージ) located in future Akihabara set 100 years from the current time.
