= Asriel (band) =

Japanese band

- Origin: Japan
- Genres: Gothic metal Dark ambient
- Years active: 2006–2015
- Labels: Pony Canyon (2014–2015); 5pb. (2008–2011); Independent (2006–2013)
- Members: KOKOMI; Kurose Keisuke
- Website: www.asriel.jp

Asriel was a Japanese metal band composed of Kurose Keisuke (composer and representative) and KOKOMI (vocal and lyrics). They were an indie group and have released 10 indie albums and 4 commercial singles. They started out releasing their music in the doujin scene, but have since also had their music used for anime and visual novels.

== Concept/history ==
The band members KOKOMI and Kurose Keisuke became acquaintances as members of LMINA Sound Art's (now known an AZE:LC). They formed their own band in May 2006, with the name written "as + real" to form as "Asriel", the origin of the group name, which is also a reference to the Islamic angel "Azrael". Kurose has stated that at the time of the band's formation, he did not know how to play musical instruments. Instead, he composed the instrumentals using digital audio workstation software.

Asriel's activities started with participation in Comiket and the Music Media-mix Market (M3) events where they sold dōjinshi music albums. In April 2008, Asriel composed the song "Metamorphose" that was used for the anime adaptation of Monochrome Factor, song that was released as a maxi single and was their first work produced by a major label, 5pb.

In the same year, Asriel provided music for the visual novel 11eyes, composing the ending theme "Kegare Naki Yume" (穢れ亡き夢) for the game. This trend would continue in the year 2009, with the song "Tsuioku no Chikai" (追憶の誓い) used for 11eyes CrossOver and "Sequentia" for the anime adaptation of 11eyes.

On December 30, 2009, Asriel released a new single titled "Devils Lullaby" during Comiket 77 in a specially shaped CD. However, the CD became difficult to sell and had to be recalled. The shape of the CD was changed back to the normal round shape on January 17, and it launched again. Since the special shape CD is no longer in circulation, it is difficult to obtain.

On June 6, 2015, Asriel disbanded following their final concert at Shibuya O-East. Since Asriel's dissolution, Kurose went on to form Elfensjón in 2018. As of 2024, KOKOMI has continued to release music as MISLIAR. She collaborated with Fate Gear on their single Winds of Fall, which released on November 29, 2023.

== Members ==
- KOKOMI (born September 2, 1989) - vocals, chorus, and lyric writing.
- Keisuke Kurose (黒瀬 圭亮, Kurose Keisuke) - guitar, keyboards, composition, arrangement and lyric writing.

== Discography ==
=== Independent ===
==== Mini albums ====
	Release date	Title	Track list	Remarks
1st	2006 August 13	白い闇に沈む永遠の夜 （Out of Print）	1. 声を奪われた少女; 2. オズと魔女; 3. Mebius Syndrome; 4. 冷たい月; 5. Silencia; 6. リンカーネイション	
2nd	2006 October 9	ガーネットの波紋に染まる空 （Out of Print）	1. Al meila 2. Alice; 3. HARM; 4. Eclipse〜月食の遊戯〜; 5. 刹那夢見る少女; 6. 宵闇の焔に焼かれて...; 7. Al meila（acoustic ver.）	
3rd	2006 December 31	月光蝶舞う深紅の花園	1. Al phobis 2. 月纏の蝶; 3. 眠りの森が魅せた夢; 4. nocturne 5. 瞳に映る最期の憧憬; 6. 深紅の花園	
4th	2007 April 29	夢の繭紡ぐ盲目の輪舞	1. 螺旋回廊; 2. 雪月花; 3. 夢纏の繭; 4. 朦朧の森の林檎; 5. ゲルゲの舞踏; 6. スカーレット; 7. 煌く星空を遮る瞼; 8. Retour; 9. 冷たい月（bonus track）	
	2007 October 8	回顧録 黒盤 Requiem	1. 声を奪われた少女; 2. Alice; 3. Silencia; 4. 刹那夢見る少女; 5. オズと魔女; 6. Mebius Syndrome; 7. ラピスラズリの幻想曲; 8. 禁断の剥離	Remake of the 1st and 2nd albums
	2008 May 11	回顧録 白盤 Reincarnat	1. Al meila 2. 宵闇の焔に焼かれて; 3. HARM; 4. Eclipse〜月食の遊戯〜; 5. リンカーネイション; 6. ガーネットの魔石; 7. 波紋の空へ還る朝	Remake of the 1st and 2nd albums
5th	May 11, 2008	禁断を呪いし儚き幻想	1. 星空舞散るあの夜に...; 2. Al xanath 3. 楓 4. 優しい嘘; 5. 死神の嘲笑; 6. MoonLightTears	
6th	2008 October 13	悪夢奏でる涙の旋律	1. Masquerade; 2. 黒の童話; 3. 赫い涙の旋律は流れ; 4. 美しき憂鬱; 5. 蝶が眺める現実の檻; 6. 沈黙の夜に囁く魔曲	
7th	2008 November 1	メルヴに堕ちる歎きの天使	1. Chaos of romantic 2. phantom 3. Al Livras; 4. 時雨の空; 5. 純潔の雪; 6. Crescent 〜夢幻の楽園〜	
9th	2009 October 11	永遠に捧げし凍てつく眠り	1. Sleeping Beauty; 2. 凍てつく焔; 3. 背徳のエデン; 4. 不滅の月夜に...; 5. 煉獄の空のAurora; 6. Garden	
10th	2010 May 5	汝を照らす朧のアリア	1. 幻想のラプソディア; 2. veladonna 3. 魔笛の慟哭; 4. ファム・ファタール; 5. 朧月夜; 6. Secret Promise; 7. Largamente	
11th	2010 October 31	薔薇の棺に太陽は在らず	1. Qliphoth; 2. Annihilation; 3. 深き森の囁き; 4. エーデルヴァイス; 5. Rosen Blood; 6. 太陽が輝く頃に	
13th	2012 April 30	淡き夢見る宵闇ノ骸華	1. カタルシス; 2. 双翼風雅; 3. Amethyst; 4. 眠りの森; 5. 宵闇の骸華; 6. Loveless	
15th	2013 April 29	黄昏の月と漆黒の太陽	1. 漆黒の太陽に灼かれて; 2. Helios; 3. TWILIGHT; 4. JUPITER; 5. パラドックス; 6. 月蝕の輪舞曲	

==== Albums ====
	Release date	Title	Track List
8th	2009 May 5	QuoVadis	1. 灰色の瞳の眷族; 2. roxalio 3. xxxに捧ぐ歌 4. Dedicate; 5. 13番目の運命; 6. Dark of romantic 7. kerveros 8. 指先の辿る残酷な旋律; 9. eternal memory 10. ルージュの刻印; 11. 終焉に咲く花; 12. Glitter Rain
12th	2011 October 30	ORATORIUM	1. Loreley; 2. LostMoon; 3. Oratorium; 4. 赫き蝶は闇夜に消えて; 5. 紅玉髄（カーネリアン）の囁き; 6. 黒い瞳の魔獣; 7. 凛 8. Windalia; 9. 硝子の吐息; 10. Lament; 11. Romancia; 12. Seiren
14th	2012 October 28	XANADU	1. Nights of Blood; 2. CRIMSON; 3. 砂漠ノ航路; 4. BIRTH; 5. COCYTUS; 6. 夢の境界; 7. その願いが罪ならば; 8. ILLUMINATE; 9. 牡丹; 10. マリオネットの恋模様; 11. 白雪纏; 12. XANADU
16th	2013 December 31	ABYSS	1. Prologue; 2. ABYSS; 3. シルエット; 4. 深紅の海で染めたなら; 5. Raison D'etre; 6. 永遠に綴りし; 7. 蜘蛛の糸; 8. SWEETHOLIC; 9. WHITE MUTE; 10. Diana; 11. FREESIA; 12. 夢御伽; 13. 白い夜波紋を映す闇; 14. Epilogue

==== Singles ====
Release date	Title	Track list
2009 December 30	Devil's Lullaby	1. 白い夜の翳り; 2. Devil's Lullaby; 3. 彷徨えし瞑宮
2010 August 14	碧い瞳の光は消えゆ	1. 桜の姫君; 2. 碧い瞳の光は消えゆ; 3. Tears Flora
2011 May 1	常しえの惑い 醒めし毒	1. 黒い瞳の魔獣; 2. 白い指先; 3. 灰色の雨音

==== Compilations ====
- 影縫い（CD『Cinderella of magic』 - 廃盤）
- Endless Waltz（CD『POLYCHROMA』 - 廃盤）（CD『POLYCHROMA re-distribution』 - とらのあな・あきばお〜 にて販売）
- Aeon（CD『-LEIRION-』 - 廃盤）
- 黒き粉雪の記憶（CD『Winter Mix vol.5』（CD『ALL SEASON MIX BEST』に再録） - とらのあなにて販売）
- 蒼月を巡る旋律（CD『Festa!』 - メロンブックス・アニメイト・ゲーマーズ・あきばおー・メッセサンオー・Amazon.co.jpにて販売）
- 淡い風に抱かれて（CD『空想RPG！』 - とらのあな・メロンブックス・アニメイト・ゲーマーズ・あきばおー・メッセサンオー・Amazon.co.jpにて販売）
- 猩紅のMirage（CD『ALL SEASON MIX BEST』 - とらのあなにて販売）
- 翡翠のMoment（CD『SUMMER VACATION』 - メロンブックスにて販売）

=== Major labels ===
==== Singles ====
Release date	Title Sold	Track list
2008 April 23	Metamorphose 5pb.	1. Metamorphose; Anime『Monochrome Factor』OP Theme; 2. 歎きの雨を一雫; 3. Metamorphose（Off Vocal）; 4. 歎きの雨を一雫（Off Vocal）
2008 May 7	穢れ亡き夢 5pb.Records	1. 穢れ亡き夢; PCゲーム『11eyes -罪と罰と贖いの少女-』ED主題歌; 2. 思いの欠片と信じる欠片; 3. 穢れ亡き夢（Off Vocal）; 4. 思いの欠片と信じる欠片（Off Vocal）
2009 April 22	追憶の誓い 5pb.Records	1. 追憶の誓い; Xbox 360ゲーム『11eyes CrossOver』ED主題歌; 2. Dearest...; 3. 追憶の誓い（Off Vocal）; 4. Dearest...（Off Vocal）
November 27, 2009	Sequentia 5pb.Records	1. Sequentia; TVアニメ『11eyes』ED主題歌; 2. 鏡の闇を穿ちて; PSPゲーム『11eyes CrossOver』挿入歌; 3. Sequentia（Off Vocal）; 4. 鏡の闇を穿ちて（Off Vocal）
2010 August 25	INNOCENT ／ALTAIR 5pb.Records	1. INNOCENT; PCゲーム『11eyes -Resona Forma-』ED主題歌; 2. ALTAIR; Xbox 360ゲーム『バレットソウル -弾魂- 』ED主題歌; 3. INNOCENT (Off Vocal); 4. ALTAIR (Off Vocal)

==== Albums ====
Release Date	Title Track List	Label
2009 May 27	unveil: 1. Metamorphose; 2. 穢れ亡き夢; 3. 千億の星屑降らす夜ノ空; PSP用ソフト『Never7 -the end of infinity-』OP主題歌; 4. 雪月花(unveil Ver.); 5. Gemini; 6. 思いの欠片と信じる欠片; 7. 氷の月夜; PS2用ソフト『モノクロームファクター cross road』OP主題歌; 8. 綻びし華; PSP用ソフト『Never7 -the end of infinity-』ED主題歌; 9. 歎きの雨を一雫; 10. 追憶の誓い(Naked JAZZ Mix); 11. Al meila(unveil Ver.); 12. unveil	5pb.Records
2010 May 26	AntiQue 〜INDIES BEST SELECTION〜: 1. 螺旋回廊; 2. ラピスラズリの幻想曲; 3. ゲルゲの舞踏; 4. 赫い涙の旋律は流れ; 5. Eclipse 〜月食の遊戯〜; 6. Moon Light Tears; 7. Judgment; PCゲーム『11eyes -Resona Forma-』挿入歌	ジェネオン
2011 January 26	Angelrhythm: 1. Angel; 2. Sequentia; TVアニメ『11eyes -罪と罰と贖いの少女-』ED主題歌; 3. Hollowly Rain; 4. FERRIS WHEEL; 5. 鏡の闇を穿ちて; PSPゲーム『11eyes -罪と罰と贖いの少女- CrossOver』挿入歌; 6. Dearest...; 7. 緋い棘; 8. 紫陽花; 9. INNOCENT; PCゲーム『11eyes -Resona Forma-』ED主題歌; 10. Finale; 11. ALTAIR; Xbox 360ゲーム『バレットソウル -弾魂-』ED主題歌; 12. White Feather	5pb.
2011 May 25	AntiQue 〜2nd collection〜: 1. 波紋の空へ還る朝; 2. 死神の嘲笑; 3. 星空舞い散るあの夜に...; 4. 宵闇の焔に焼かれて...; 5. Al phobis 6. nocturne 7. LABYRINTH	5pb.
