= Why Does Nobody Remember Me in This World? =

Japanese light novel series

- First light novel volume cover

なぜ僕の世界を誰も覚えていないのか？ (Naze Boku no Sekai o Dare mo Oboeteinainoka?)
- Genre: Fantasy
- Light novel
- Written by: Kei Sazane
- Illustrated by: Neco
- Published by: Media Factory
- Imprint: MF Bunko J
- Original run: July 25, 2017 – August 25, 2020
- Volumes: 9
- Manga
- Written by: Kei Sazane
- Illustrated by: Arikan
- Published by: Media Factory
- English publisher: NA: Kadokawa
- Magazine: Monthly Comic Alive
- Original run: February 27, 2018 – October 27, 2025
- Volumes: 14
- Anime television series
- Directed by: Tatsuma Minamikawa
- Written by: Satoru Sugizawa
- Music by: Akiyoshi Yasuda
- Studio: Project No.9
- Licensed by: Crunchyroll: EA/SEA: Medialink
- Original network: Tokyo MX, BS Asahi, Kansai TV, AT-X
- Original run: July 13, 2024 – September 28, 2024
- Episodes: 12
- icon

Why Does Nobody Remember Me in This World? (なぜ僕の世界を誰も覚えていないのか？, Naze Boku no Sekai o Dare mo Oboeteinainoka?) is a Japanese light novel series written by Kei Sazane with illustrations by Neco. It was published under Media Factory's MF Bunko J imprint from July 2017 to August 2020. A manga adaptation illustrated by Arikan was serialized in Media Factory's Monthly Comic Alive manga magazine from February 2018 to October 2025. An anime television series adaptation produced by Project No.9 aired from July to September 2024.

== Plot ==
A war between five races for supremacy on Earth is won by humanity, led by the hero Sid. Suddenly, history gets overwritten so that Sid never existed, leading to humanity losing and becoming subjugated by the other races. All of this is witnessed by a boy named Kai, who is mysteriously unaffected by the alterations. In this new world, Kai finds that he never existed previously, so no one knows him. After meeting a mysterious girl named Rinne, Kai is inspired to become the hero himself and free humanity.

== Characters ==
Kai Sakura-Vento (カイ・サクラ = ヴェント, Kai Sakura Vento)
Voiced by: Shōya Chiba (Japanese); Ricco Fajardo (English)
A soldier of the Urza Federation who remembers the original world for unknown reasons.
Rinne (リンネ, Rin'ne)
Voiced by: Kana Ichinose (Japanese); Emi Lo (English)
A girl of an unknown non-demon race whom Kai rescues. She is brought to the human resistance camp where she helps them in the fight against the demons.
Jeanne E. Anis (ジャンヌ・E・アニス, Jannu E. Anisu)
Voiced by: Haruka Shiraishi (Japanese); Megan Shipman (English)
A high-ranking soldier of the Urza Federation Army and Kai's close childhood friend from his world. In the alternate world, she leads the human resistance masquerading as a man, with her true identity as a woman only known to a few close aides.
Ashran Highroll (アシュラン・ハイロール, Ashuran Hairōru)
Voiced by: Seiichiro Yamashita (Japanese); Justin Green (English)
A soldier and Kai's colleague of the Urza Federation Army. In the alternate world, he is a member of the human resistance force.
Saki Miscotti (サキ・ミスコッティ, Saki Misukotti)
Voiced by: Sayumi Suzushiro (Japanese); Jill Harris (English)
A soldier and Kai's colleague in the Urza Federation Army. In the alternate world, she is a member of the human resistance force.
Falin Rina Yubikitasu (花琳・リナ・ユビキタス, Farin Rina Yubikitasu)
Voiced by: Lynn (Japanese); Corey Pettit (English)
Jeanne's close aide and bodyguard.
Reiren Reiru Reicherieru (レーレーン・レイル・レーチェリエル, Rērēn Reiru Rēcherieru)
Voiced by: Hana Hishikawa (Japanese); Cayla Martin (English)
An elf shrine maiden who joins Kai's team after falling in love with him.

== Media ==
=== Light novel ===
No.	Release date	ISBN
1	July 25, 2017	978-4-04-069351-4
2	October 25, 2017	978-4-04-069509-9
3	February 24, 2018	978-4-04-069739-0
4	June 25, 2018	978-4-04-069955-4
5	October 25, 2018	978-4-04-065239-9
6	February 25, 2019	978-4-04-065530-7
7	August 25, 2019	978-4-04-065799-8
8	February 25, 2020	978-4-04-064446-2
9	August 25, 2020	978-4-04-064876-7

=== Manga ===
A manga adaptation illustrated by Arikan was serialized in Media Factory's Monthly Comic Alive manga magazine from February 27, 2018, to October 27, 2025. It was collected in fourteen volumes released from June 23, 2018, to November 21, 2025. The manga adaptation is published digitally in English on Kadokawa Corporation's BookWalker website.

No.	Japanese release date	Japanese ISBN
1	June 23, 2018	978-4-04-069991-2
2	November 21, 2018	978-4-04-065324-2
3	May 23, 2019	978-4-04-065657-1
4	November 22, 2019	978-4-04-064090-7
5	March 23, 2020	978-4-04-064527-8
6	October 23, 2020	978-4-04-064889-7
7	April 23, 2021	978-4-04-680406-8
8	October 21, 2021	978-4-04-680797-7
9	February 21, 2023	978-4-04-681314-5
10	September 22, 2023	978-4-04-682746-3
11	April 23, 2024	978-4-04-683457-7
12	September 21, 2024	978-4-04-684101-8
13	April 23, 2025	978-4-04-684688-4
14	November 21, 2025	978-4-04-685245-8

=== Anime ===
In July 2023, during the MF Bunko J Summer School Festival 2023 event, an anime television series adaptation was announced. It is produced by Project No.9 and directed by Tatsuma Minamikawa, with scripts written by Satoru Sugizawa, and characters designed by Hiromi Kato. While the series received an advance screening on June 16, 2024, at the Grand Cinema Sunshine in Ikebukuro, Tokyo, it aired from July 13 to September 28, 2024, on Tokyo MX and other networks. The opening theme song is "Sekai Rinne" (世界輪廻; lit. 'World Reincarnation') performed by Unlucky Morpheus, while the multiple ending theme songs are performed in the following: the first is "Togirenaide" (途切れないで; lit. 'Don't Stop') performed by Susu, the second is "Ai, Amnesia" (愛、アムネジア; lit. 'Love, Amnesia') performed by Urbangarde, and the third is "Umbra" performed by Elfensjón. Crunchyroll licensed the series. Medialink licensed the series in East, Southeast Asia and Oceania (except Australia and New Zealand) for streaming on Ani-One Asia's YouTube channel.

==== Episodes ====
No.	Title	Directed by (Note: Production staff information is taken from the ending credits of each episode.)	Written by	Storyboarded by	Original release date
1	"The Boy Forgotten By the World"; Transliteration: "Sekai Kara Wasurerareta Shōnen" (Japanese: 世界から忘れられた少年)	Project No.9	Satoru Sugisawa	Tatsuma Minamikawa	July 13, 2024
The hero Sid once led humanity to victory against the demons, celestials (which include angels, elves, dwarves, and fairies), spirits, and magical beasts (which include dragons). In the present, the soldier Kai and his comrades Ashran and Saki regularly inspect a monolith that seals the demons away. Kai is the only one who takes this job seriously because he once fell into the demon realm as a child, though no one believed him. Kai goes on a date with fellow soldier Jeanne. As they talk, reality suddenly distorts and Kai finds himself in a ruined city and attacked by two demons. He kills one and is rescued from the other by Ashran and Saki, who take him to an underground shelter. He is hurt and confused when neither they nor Jeanne recognize him. They have never heard of Sid and explain humanity was defeated in the war so they formed the last human resistance. Realizing the monolith is still there, Kai enters it and finds Sid's holy sword. He is transported to another area and finds a girl in chains with angelic and demonic wings, who begs him to free her.
2	"Rinne" (Japanese: リンネ)	Asahi Yoshimura	Satoru Sugisawa	Tsutomu Miyazawa	July 20, 2024
The girl introduces herself as Rinne before passing out. Kai uses the holy sword, Codeholder, to break the chains, but Rinne attacks him, accusing him of being a demon sent by Vanessa. After he defeats her, a seemingly mechanical woman attacks them, but Kai uses Codeholder to cut through dimensions and return them to the monolith. Rinne apologizes and explains Vanessa is the hero of the demons whom she feuded with as she is an outcast from all races. She remembers the original timeline with Sid. Kai takes Rinne back to the shelter after she conceals her wings, but she causes problems since she is unfamiliar with modern technology and keeps picking fights. That night, demons break into the shelter. The defenders' guns are useless, but Kai saves Ashran and Saki and kills the demons with anti-magic bullets and techniques unknown to the people here with Rinne's assistance. Kai and Rinne are brought to a council who do not believe their tale of an alternate timeline, but Jeanne trusts Kai after he reveals knowledge of her nicknames for her father and grandfather and the fact she is a girl pretending to be a man. They make a plan where Jeanne's troops will distract the demons while Kai and Rinne assassinate Vanessa.
3	"The Demon Hero"; Transliteration: "Akuma no eiyū" (Japanese: 悪魔の英雄)	Kōsuke Shimotori	Satoru Sugisawa	Tsutomu Miyazawa	July 27, 2024
Ashran and Saki are assigned to help Kai and Rinne. The troops storm the capital building to take on the demons and rescue human slaves. Besides Kai and Rinne, only Falin, who uses swords made from a dragon's fangs, and Jeanne, who uses an elf garment for protection and an angelic blade, can actually fight the demons. Rinne makes invisibility cloaks for her group, but they are spotted anyway due to infrared cameras. Rinne takes on the guards, who sense she is a mongrel of several races, while Kai takes on Vanessa. Vanessa is a succubus, and when her charms are ineffective, questions him. He tells her of his original world and she has a strange reaction to hearing Sid's name and seeing Codeholder. She puts Kai on the ropes with several destructive spells. A wounded Rinne joins them, but Vanessa does not recognize her. Suddenly, the mechanical woman, whom Vanessa calls Last Riser, appears and attacks Vanessa, saying anyone who learns of Sid must be eliminated. Vanessa angrily blasts her and makes her retreat. A terrified Rinne says Vanessa is even more powerful than the one she knows.
4	"And So, She Remembered That World"; Transliteration: "Soshite Sekai o Kioku Suru" (Japanese: そして世界を記憶する)	Project No.9	Satoru Sugisawa	Shinji Itadaki	August 3, 2024
Rinne tries to contain Vanessa with a force field and tells Kai to run, but Vanessa breaks it and blasts Kai, seemingly killing him. Enraged, Rinne displays the powers of all the races, allowing her to hurt Vanessa, but she mocks Rinne for not showing this power earlier out of fear of being called a monster. Rinne tries to kill her with a suicidal spell, but runs out of mana due to Vanessa draining it. Kai revives and resumes the battle. Ashran and Saki turn off the lights, distracting Vanessa long enough for Kai to fatally wound her. As she slowly dies, Vanessa suddenly remembers Sid and says he trusted her to hide Codeholder in the monolith in order to counter the world being rewritten. Before she disintegrates, she acknowledges Kai as a worthy opponent and promises to come back and seduce him. With the other demons defeated, the humans retake the capital city. Jeanne plans to join the resistance groups fighting the other races. Kai and Rinne agree to join her.
5	"To the East of the World"; Transliteration: "Sekai no Azuma e" (Japanese: 世界の東へ)	Project No.9	Satoru Sugisawa	Toshiyuki Fujisawa	August 10, 2024
Vanessa's sister Hinemarill greets Kai and Rinne, thanking them for killing Vanessa and letting her take her place. She calls a truce between humans and demons and encourages them to fight the other races, warning them about the hero of the celestials, the angel Alfreya. The army moves from the Urza Federation to the Io Federation, which is occupied by the celestials. En route, they are attacked by a dragon until Kai and Rinne fend it off. As they camp, Kai is uncomfortable when Rinne and Jeanne share his bed. They reach the Io resistance, but their leader Dante is rude and egotistical, accusing Jeanne of stealing his glory. Dante gets increasingly angry when Jeanne rises in popularity due to being willing to fight alongside the men. His secretary Qubirey encourages him to lead an offensive from the front without informing Jeanne's forces. Rinne later voices suspicions that Qubirey is not human. Meanwhile, Alfreya has allied with Last Riser and shocks his allies by proclaiming all other races except angels are unneeded and will be eliminated.
6	"Elven Forest"; Transliteration: "Erufu no mori" (Japanese: エルフの森)	Project No.9, Shōgo Shimizu	Satoru Sugisawa	Noriaki Saitō	August 17, 2024
Alfreya traps the High Elf Elder in crystal and the elf shrine maiden Reiren barely escapes. Dante and his forces are missing, so Kai's group searches for them. They enter the elf forest and learn Qubirey was an elf in disguise who captured and paralyzed Dante and his forces. Reiren tells them of how Alfreya betrayed them and asks for help, offering to go with them. Kai asks Reiren if she knows Sid, but she does not. Reiren teleports herself and the group to the angels' palace, where they find several angels burning alive. The angel Vicious explains they were punished not obeying Alfreya and that the High Elf Elder will be executed soon. Falin, Ashran, and Saki hold her off. The angel Raphaelo attacks and Rinne holds him off. Kai, Jeanne, and Reiren reach the High Elf Elder, but Alfreya appears and rants that all other races are inferior to angels.
7	"Heartless Angel"; Transliteration: "Kokoro nai Tenshi" (Japanese: 心無い天使)	Project No.9	Satoru Sugisawa	Noriaki Saitō	August 24, 2024
Falin defeats Vicious by disabling her wings. After Rinne punches his helmet apart, Raphaelo surrenders and tells her to stop Alfreya as he has gone mad. As they fight Alfreya, he mocks Jeanne's weapons even when she cuts him and points out that they are draining her life force. Reiren had been in love with Alfreya and asks why he is doing this, and he says she is inferior. Alfreya is intrigued by Codeholder's ability to block his attacks, but mocks Vanessa when Kai points out he defeated her. Reiren tries to free the Elder from the crystal, but her sacred dagger shatters against it. Alfreya is many times more powerful than normal and he calls on Last Riser, who makes an explosion that sends Jeanne flying. Rinne catches her and is relieved when Jeanne doesn't mind seeing her wings. Kai asks Alfreya if he was the one who reset the world and if he knows Sid. He doesn't know what he is talking about, but he starts to remember Sid. Last Riser turns on and disintegrates Alfreya for learning about Sid, then resurrects and possesses him. The new Alfreya stabs Reiren, prompting an angry Kai to fight him.
8	"Heaven's Purgatory"; Transliteration: "Tenkai no Rengoku" (Japanese: 天界の煉獄)	Project No.9	Satoru Sugisawa	Noriaki Saitō	August 31, 2024
As Alfreya and Kai continue to fight, Reiren and Jeanne combine their powers to blast Alfreya's arm off, allowing Kai to land the final blow. The dying Alfreya snaps out of his madness and apologizes to everyone as the crystal holding the Elder breaks. He tells Kai that Sid told him "something" was supposed to exist and that the world was reset due to hatred. After Rinne has a nightmare of her and Sid being chased by Last Riser, she and Kai tell Jeanne what little they know of her origins, who accepts this and agrees to keep the secret. The celestials give the humans new weapons and agree to a year-long truce. They admit that Alfreya went mad after they saw him talking to the hero of the beasts, Rath=IE, and then met Last Riser. The Elder orders Reiren to go with Kai's group because she noticed Reiren has fallen in love with Kai, embarrassing her and making Rinne jealous. Dante is jealous that Jeanne succeeded where he failed. Meanwhile, Rath=IE meets the hero of the spirits, Rikugen Kyoko, and they discuss Vanessa and Alfreya's deaths. Rath=IE then declares she will exterminate the spirits.
9	"The Center of The World"; Transliteration: "Sekai no chūshin" (Japanese: 世界の中心)	Project No.9	Satoru Sugisawa	Toshiyuki Fujisawa	September 7, 2024
Rath=IE and Kyoko fight until Last Riser helps Rath=IE, forcing Kyoko to flee. As Jeanne's forces drive to the territory of the spirits, Rinne gets increasingly jealous of Reiren. They stop at a hot spring and Rinne and Reiren argue about what Kai would find attractive, but Jeanne stops them to discuss Codeholder, the world reset, and Last Riser. They are attacked by the beast Behemoth even though they are still in celestial territory. They defeat it, but Kai is wounded and Jeanne, Rinne, and Reiren tend to him. He wakes up when both he and Jeanne dream of a building and a female voice beckoning them. Reiren leads them to the building, which she says was made by humans a long time ago with an unknown purpose, making Kai suspect it is like the monolith. When they reach it, the voice beckons them, claiming they are at the center of the world.
10	"The Prophet of This World"; Transliteration: "Kono Sekai no Yogen-sha" (Japanese: この世界の預言者)	Project No.9	Satoru Sugisawa	Noriaki Saitō	September 14, 2024
Reiren cannot hear the voice, so Kai, Jeanne, and Rinne enter while she stands guard. They find a statue of a woman and the voice says she is Arsla Solaka, the goddess who was Sid's patron and gave him Codeholder. Creating Codeholder drained her strength so she could not counter the world being reset and Sid being erased. She has chosen Jeanne to take Sid's place as the hero of humanity. Though she praises Kai's actions, he was not supposed to exist in this world. Arsla does not know what Last Riser is and is not sure if defeating her will change the world back. The group does not tell Reiren what they found. They go to the Yulun Federation where they find another monolith and are attacked by slime monsters, but are rescued by Yulun forces led by Falin's old friend Balmung. They investigate a new lake, but as Rinne says it is a spirit, the water turns into Kyoko. She says the humans are in her way.
11	"Where Fate Sleeps"; Transliteration: "Unmei no Nemuru Tokoro" (Japanese: 運命の眠るところ)	Project No.9	Satoru Sugisawa	Toshiyuki Fujisawa	September 21, 2024
Kyoko attacks them with fire and water spells but stops when she recognizes Codeholder and remembers Sid. Last Riser attacks her for remembering Sid, but she drives her away. Kyoko calls for a ceasefire and explains Last Riser is an embodiment of hatred and not one of the five races, and Rath=IE has teamed up with her. They investigate the monolith, which has the same layout as the first one. They hear Sid's voice apologize for failing to protect Rinne before they are all transported to the place where Rinne was chained and find Alfreya turned to stone. Last Riser attacks and teleports Jeanne, Falin, Balmung, and Reiren outside the monolith. Unable to reenter, Reiren decides to forge new weapons in preparation. Kai, Rinne, and Kyoko are left to fight Last Riser, but Rinne is frozen in fear. Every time they destroy Last Riser, she reappears in a new body, so they grab Alfreya and Kai uses Codeholder to cut through dimensions and return them to the monolith. Last Riser follows them and they destroy her again, but she just reappears, this time in a body so powerful that Reiren is shocked when she senses it.
12	"Those Who Shatter the Endless Cycle of World Reincarnation"; Transliteration: "Mugen ni Mawaru Sekai Rinne o Kudaku Mono" (Japanese: 無限にまわる世界輪廻を砕くもの)	Project No.9	Satoru Sugisawa	Tsutomu Miyazawa	September 28, 2024
Rinne remembers Sid failing to stop Last Riser from capturing her. Kyoko resorts to a self-destruct attack, but Last Riser survives. Everyone attacks Last Riser and Jeanne decapitates her, but her head sings, then reality distorts and everyone except Kai, Rinne, and Last Riser disappears. Last Riser turns into a copy of Sid with a copy of Codeholder and fights Kai after sending Rinne through a portal. Rinne is chained up again, but she breaks free and returns. Together, they destroy Last Riser, then reality distorts and Kai passes out. When he wakes up, Rinne confesses her feelings and tries to kiss him, but Jeanne and Reiren interrupt and the three girls jealously argue about who deserves him, while Kai is confused about what they are talking about. Kyoko survived, but shrunk to a few inches tall after using up so much mana. The humans and spirits formed a truce and they leave the Alfreya statue in the monolith until something can be done. The Arsla Solaka statue slowly cracks as she says Last Riser lives and Kai and Rinne's ordeal is not over. Kai's group prepares to go after Rath=IE.

== Reception ==
By July 2023, the series had over 700,000 copies in circulation.

== See also ==
- Gods' Games We Play, another light novel series by the same author
- Our Last Crusade or the Rise of a New World, another light novel series by the same author
