= The Magical Revolution of the Reincarnated Princess and the Genius Young Lady =

Japanese light novel series and its franchise

- First light novel volume cover, featuring Anisphia (left) and Euphyllia (right)

転生王女と天才令嬢の魔法革命 (Tensei Ōjo to Tensai Reijō no Mahō Kakumei)
- Genre: Isekai; Yuri
- Novel series
- Written by: Piero Karasu
- Published by: Shōsetsuka ni Narō
- Original run: February 13, 2019 – August 19, 2021
- Light novel
- Written by: Piero Karasu
- Illustrated by: Yuri Kisaragi
- Published by: Kadokawa Shoten
- English publisher: NA: Yen Press
- Imprint: Fujimi Fantasia Bunko
- Original run: January 18, 2020 – February 20, 2026
- Volumes: 13
- Manga
- Written by: Piero Karasu
- Illustrated by: Harutsugu Nadaka
- Published by: ASCII Media Works
- English publisher: NA: Yen Press
- Magazine: Dengeki Maoh
- Original run: July 27, 2020 – March 27, 2026
- Volumes: 9
- Anime television series
- Directed by: Shingo Tamaki
- Written by: Wataru Watari
- Music by: Moe Hyūga
- Studio: Diomedéa
- Licensed by: Crunchyroll: SA/SEA: Muse Communication
- Original network: AT-X, Tokyo MX, TVA, Kansai TV, BS11
- Original run: January 4, 2023 – March 22, 2023
- Episodes: 12
- icon

The Magical Revolution of the Reincarnated Princess and the Genius Young Lady (Note: Japanese: 転生王女と天才令嬢の魔法革命, Hepburn: Tensei Ōjo to Tensai Reijō no Mahō Kakumei) is a Japanese light novel series written by Piero Karasu and illustrated by Yuri Kisaragi. The series follows Anisphia, a princess who uses her memories of a past life to pursue her theory of "magicology", and Euphyllia, a talented magic user left disgraced after the kingdom's prince breaks off their engagement.

The series was first serialized on the user-generated novel publishing website Shōsetsuka ni Narō between February 2019 and August 2021. It was later acquired by Fujimi Shobo, which published the series in print between January 2020 and February 2026 under its Fujimi Fantasia Bunko imprint. From July 2020 to March 2026, a manga adaptation with art by Harutsugu Nadaka was serialized in ASCII Media Works' Dengeki Maoh. An anime television series adaptation produced by Diomedéa aired from January to March 2023.

Karasu wrote the original story with the intent to break from conventions found in isekai, a genre of fiction involving travel or reincarnation into different worlds. Accordingly, he wrote Anisphia to only recall a few memories after her reincarnation rather than her full past life and personality. Furthermore, although Karasu did not originally intend to write about yuri, a genre featuring intimate relationships between female characters, he decided to focus more on the main characters' romantic relationship as serialization progressed. For the subsequent adaptions into different mediums, several adjustments were made, including the changing of character designs from the light novels and the addition of original scenes for the anime adaptation.

By December 2023, the light novels had over 1 million copies in circulation. The light novels and manga adaptation have been well received by critics for the story's premise and characters, though its pacing has been met with more mixed reactions. The anime adaptation was similarly well received, with particular praise for its production value, and was named by several critics as being among the best of the year.

== Plot ==
In a fantastical kingdom named Palettia, nobles are distinguished from commoners due to their ability to use magic. However, the kingdom's princess, Anisphia, lacks this ability despite her royal ancestry. As a child, she regains memories of her previous life in a modern civilization, and uses these memories to become an inventor of magical gadgets. During a mishap with her flying broomstick, she stumbles upon her brother, Crown Prince Algard, breaking off his engagement to his fiancée, Euphyllia. To shield Euphyllia from further scandal, Anisphia invites her to become a live-in research assistant. The pair work together to defeat a dragon, which yields Anisphia a crystal that lets her indirectly wield the dragon's magic. Shortly after, she discovers that Lainie, a commoner-turned-noble rumored to be Algard's love interest, is a vampire. Lainie moves to Anisphia's residence to bring her vampiric powers under control, but is attacked by Algard, who becomes a vampire himself by seizing Lainie's magical crystal. His plan to exploit his powers to rule as a tyrant is quickly foiled by Anisphia; he ultimately admits to her that he feels unfit to rule.

The king disinherits and exiles Algard, leaving Anisphia as the sole remaining heir. Realizing that Anisphia would have to give up on her dream of researching magic as the future queen, Euphyllia learns that she can inherit the throne in Anisphia's place by making a covenant with a great spirit. Anisphia is initially against her plan and duels her for the throne, but Euphyllia completes the covenant and wins the duel. She confesses her love to Anisphia and kisses her. Euphyllia becomes the queen of Palettia after the reigning monarchs adopt her and abdicate.

== Characters ==
=== Main ===
Anisphia "Anis" Wynn Palettia (アニスフィア·ウィン·パレッティア, Anisufia Win Parettia)
Voiced by: Sayaka Senbongi
The main protagonist and the first princess of the Kingdom of Palettia. She has always loved magic yet, being reincarnated from Earth, cannot use it herself. To compensate, she turns to science and uses her previous life's knowledge to make magical gadgets that can be used by anyone. She is also an open lesbian. While her eccentricities cause others to see her as a problem child who forced her responsibilities onto her younger brother, Algard, she initially ceded the throne out of her own belief that she would not be a good ruler. Following a fight with a dragon, she gets afflicted with a curse that begins slowly turning her into a dragon herself. Algard's exile briefly makes her the kingdom's sole heir, but Euphyllia takes her place by becoming queen instead.
Euphyllia "Euphy" Magenta (ユフィリア·マゼンタ, Yufiria Mazenta) / Euphyllia "Euphy" Fes Palettia (ユフィリア·フェズ·パレッティア, Yufiria Fezu Parettia)
Voiced by: Manaka Iwami
A high-ranking noble and the ex-fiancée of Anisphia's younger brother, Algard. She became Anisphia's research assistant after Algard broke off their engagement for allegedly bullying Lainie. While talented in magic and politics, Euphyllia initially keeps others away with her perfectionist attitude but slowly opens up after being taken in by Anisphia and begins to develop romantic feelings toward her. She is later adopted into the royal family after completing a Spirit Covenant and becomes eligible for the throne, so it would not be forced onto Anisphia after Algard is disowned. However, the Covenant has also turned her into a spirit reliant on magical energy to survive, which she takes from Anisphia through kisses.

=== Main supporting ===
Ilia Coral (イリア·コーラル, Iria Kōraru)
Voiced by: Ai Kakuma
Anisphia's maid, with whom she shares a close, sister-like relationship.
Lainie Cyan (レイニ·シアン, Reini Shian)
Voiced by: Hina Yōmiya
A commoner-turned-noble rumored to be Algard's love interest. She is eventually revealed to be a vampire who unwittingly generates a charm, making people infatuated with her, and was born to a noble father and vampire mother. Following this revelation, she is taken in by Anisphia as a maid while learning to control her abilities. However, awakening to her true nature caused her to begin craving blood, which Ilia helps alleviate by letting her suck hers. Lainie goes on to develop romantic feelings for Ilia.
Tilty Claret (ティルティ·クラーレット, Tiruti Kurāretto)
Voiced by: Yū Sasahara
A noblewoman and Anisphia's longtime alchemist friend. Though born with powerful magic, her body cannot handle it, causing her pain and violent outbursts whenever she uses it. Ostracized by her family, she lives alone in a villa and is treated for her condition by Anisphia. Her past has led her to become obsessed with incurable conditions, which she calls "curses", and she often supports Anisphia in her research by developing drugs.

=== Secondary supporting ===
Orphans Il Palettia (オルファンス·イル·パレッティア, Orufansu Iru Parettia)
Voiced by: Kenji Hamada
Anisphia's father and the king of the Kingdom of Palettia. While he truly cares for his children, his royal responsibilities force him to put his country first. The stress of ruling—and Anisphia's antics—has negatively impacted his health, making him look older than he actually is.
Sylphine Maise Palettia (シルフィーヌ·メイズ·パレッティア, Shirufīnu Meizu Parettia)
Voiced by: Sachiko Kojima
Anisphia's mother and the queen of the Kingdom of Palettia. Though youthful in appearance, when she was young she was a fearsome warrior who raised her children in her spartan ways, making her the only person Anisphia fears. However, she cares greatly for her children and later becomes calmer following Algard's failed coup, believing that she had failed as a mother.
Grantz Magenta (グランツ·マゼンタ, Gurantsu Mazenta)
Voiced by: Tomohiro Tsuboi
Euphyllia's father and the prime minister of the Kingdom of Palettia. While he initially had a somewhat strained relationship with his daughter, after her engagement is canceled he realizes that he had impossible expectations of her and apologizes, causing their bond to improve considerably. However, he is later forced to cut her off after she is adopted into the royal family to inherit the throne in Anisphia's place.
Lumielle "Lumi" Rene Palettia (リュミエル·レネ·パレッティア, Ryumieru Rene Parettia)
Voiced by: Rie Kugimiya
The ancestor of the royal family of the Kingdom of Palettia. While seemingly around the same age as Anisphia, she is actually a human-turned-spirit who is close to a thousand years old, having completed a covenant with a great spirit that granted her immortality.

=== Antagonists ===
Algard "Allie" Von Palettia (アルガルド·ボナ·パレッティア, Arugarudo Bona Parettia)
Voiced by: Shogo Sakata
Anisphia's younger brother and the crown prince of the Kingdom of Palettia, as his sister gave up her right to the throne. He is also Euphyllia's ex-fiancé, after he broke off their engagement for allegedly bullying Lainie, his apparent love interest. It is eventually revealed that he has always admired his sister, which drove him to plot a revolution to purge the country's corrupt nobles who treated her as second-class due to their culture and religion of magical elitism. He steals Lainie's vampiric abilities to enact his plan to brainwash nobles and rule as an autocrat. In the end, while he reconciles with Anisphia, he is disinherited and exiled for his attempted coup d'etat.
Count Chartreuse (シャルトールズ伯爵, Sharutōruzu hakushaku)
Voiced by: Wataru Tsuyuzaki
The minister of magic who opposes any changes that might endanger the nobles' authority, like Anisphia's inventions. Intending to exploit Lainie's magical powers, he played an active role in abetting the prince's attempted revolution. In the end, he is executed for treason after the plot is exposed.
Moritz Chartreuse (モーリッツ·シャルトルーズ, Mōrittsu Sharutorūzu)
Voiced by: Taku Yashiro
Count Chartreuse's son and Algard's friend who supports him in breaking off his engagement with Euphyllia. It is later revealed that he was the only one in Algard's inner circle who was not under Lainie's charm and played an active role in the prince's attempted revolution, causing him to be arrested after the plot is exposed.

== Production ==
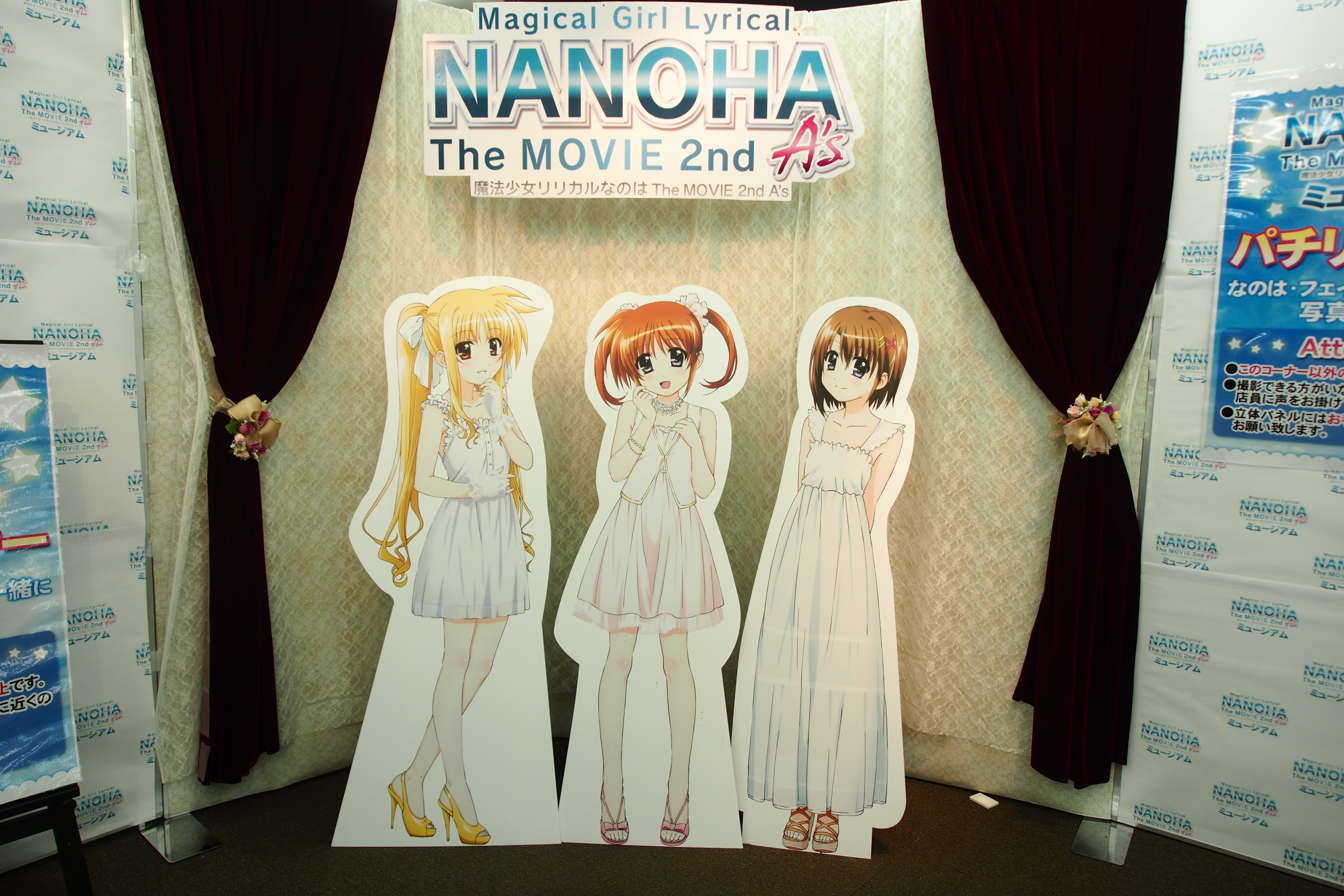
Piero Karasu cited the Magical Girl Lyrical Nanoha series (characters pictured) as a personal influence.

The series began as a self-published web novel by Piero Karasu on the website Shōsetsuka ni Narō, under a different title: The Reincarnated Princess Continues to Long for Magic (転生王女様は魔法に憧れ続けている, Tensei Ōjo-sama wa Mahō ni Akogare Tsuzuketeiru). From the story's outset, Karasu wanted to break from genre conventions that were present in other isekai web novels. The isekai genre, characterized by a person travelling or reincarnating into another world, often entails a main character treating their new life as a do-over of their mundane previous life. However, Karasu limited the continuity between Anisphia's past and new life to only a few retained memories. Lainie was also designed as a subversion of the villainess archetype; despite her antagonistic position at the start of the story, she was written to be more sympathetic by being unaware of her role in Algard and Euphyllia's broken engagement.

Karasu was inspired by the anime series Neon Genesis Evangelion and Magical Girl Lyrical Nanoha, as well as tabletop role-playing games that he had played in the past. Nanoha was a particular influence on Anisphia and Euphyllia's relationship, as it featured a similarly close bond between two female protagonists. Karasu stated that his story incorporates elements of yuri, a genre of fiction that features intimacy between female characters. While he did not originally intend to write a yuri work, the romantic relationship between the two female leads gradually became central to the story as he serialized it online. After the release of the anime adaptation, head writer Wataru Watari stated that Anisphia and Euphyllia's onscreen kiss was not given special consideration during production, describing it as "just another scene we worked on out of many."

The series went through considerable revisions before it was published as a light novel, but the plot structure of the original was retained throughout. Anisphia and Euphyllia's character designs were tweaked; per Karasu, the two were relatives in the web novel and were both blonde, but Euphyllia's hair was changed to silver in the light novel to differentiate her from Anisphia. Likewise, the first episode of the anime adaptation also diverged from the light novel and manga. While the previous adaptations began the story with Algard breaking his engagement to Euphyllia, the anime included original scenes to introduce the main characters before Algard breaks his engagement. The anime's character designs, created by Naomi Ide, were based on illustrations in the light novels instead of the manga; director Shingo Tamaki believed that the light novel illustrations were a closer match to Ide's art style.

== Media ==
=== Light novels ===
The series was originally serialized online between February 2019 and August 2021 on the user-generated novel publishing website Shōsetsuka ni Narō. It was later acquired by Fujimi Shobo and published with illustrations by Yuri Kisaragi under their light novel imprint Fujimi Fantasia Bunko, which was announced on October 2019, with the first volume being released on January 18, 2020. Apart from standalone volumes, the light novel was published in Dragon Magazine, which also published several short stories by Piero Karasu based on the series. These short stories were published as a single volume by Fantasia Bunko titled Tensei Ōjo-sama to Tensai Reijō no Mahō Kakumei – Ōkyū Hiwa (転生王女と天才令嬢の魔法革命 王宮秘話), meaning The Magical Revolution of the Reincarnated Princess and the Genius Young Lady: Secret Tales of the Royal Palace, on August 20, 2024. The light novel series ended with the release of its thirteenth volume on February 20, 2026. Yen Press has licensed the series in North America.

=== Manga ===
A manga adaptation with art by Harutsugu Nadaka was serialized in ASCII Media Works' magazine Dengeki Maoh from July 27, 2020, to March 27, 2026. The adaptation's tankōbon releases concluded with the ninth volume on June 26, 2026. The manga is licensed in North America by Yen Press.

=== Anime ===
In August 2022, it was announced that the novels would be adapted into an anime television series. It is produced by Diomedéa and directed by Shingo Tamaki, with scripts written by Wataru Watari, character designs handled by Naomi Ide, creature designs by Tsutomu Miyazawa, and music composed by Moe Hyūga. The series aired from January 4 to March 22, 2023, on AT-X and other networks. The opening theme song is "Arc-en-Ciel" by Hanatan, while the ending theme song is "Only for You" by Sayaka Senbongi and Manaka Iwami. The series was released as two DVD and Blu-Ray boxed sets in 2023, which include a bonus novel by Karasu about Anisphia's childhood. Crunchyroll streamed the series outside of Asia, while Muse Asia streamed it in South and Southeast Asia.

== Reception ==
=== Sales ===
By January 2022, the series had over 180,000 copies in circulation, according to publisher sales figures. By December 2023, the light novels had over one million copies in circulation. Between November 1, 2022, and October 31, 2023, the light novels were the 9th-most-downloaded on BookWalker, a Japanese e-book platform. According to Oricon, the 13th and final light novel volume ranked 8th in sales for the week of March 2, 2026.

=== Accolades ===
The manga adaptation ranked 14th in the 2023 Next Manga Award in the print manga category. According to Anime Corner, the anime adaptation ranked 3rd in an audience vote with 41,762 participants for the best anime of the season, receiving a score of 5.87%. The anime adaptation ranked 1st by audience vote in the "Favorite Opening Theme Song", "Favorite Action or Adventure", and "Favorite Fantasy" categories of the Winter 2023 Anime Awards by Anime Trending.

=== Critical reception ===
==== Light novels ====
The premise of the series was generally well received. Demelza of Anime UK News gave the first light novel volume an 8/10 rating, opining that it was "simply [...] fun to read" and balanced "keeping things light-hearted and also emotional when it needs to be." Erica Friedman concurred, writing that the reader naturally "cheer[s] for [Euphyllia and Anisphia] as they launch themselves into a grand adventure." Reviewing a later volume in the series, Friedman described the story as "immensely satisfying" as well as "emotionally heavy in the most honest and useful way possible".

The story's characters were met with similarly favorable reactions. Sean Gaffney of Manga Bookshelf described the debut volume as a "definite winner" for its protagonists, while Friedman called Anisphia a "delight" who "fills the pages" of the story. Rebecca Silverman of Anime News Network (ANN) felt that Karasu's "nice touch" with the two main characters' relationship allowed for a "really slow and sweet" romance. Demelza opined that the interactions between the characters are what "truly shine" about the story.

The plot and pacing of the series received more mixed opinions. Silverman criticized the exposition as excessive, writing that it "buried" character interactions at times. She concluded that the first book did not reach its full potential, but that a second volume might be worth reading. In contrast, while Demelza concurred that the debut volume's pacing seemed slow, she felt that "the climax manages to make up for [it]" through having the two main characters confront their feelings. Similarly, reviewing the second volume, Gaffney stated that it "starts slow but picks up speed" with an "interesting twist".

==== Manga ====
The manga adaptation of the light novels was praised by Silverman, who scored the first volume 3.5/5 and remarked that the flaws of the light novels were "largely absent" from the adaptation. In particular, she commended the use of visual storytelling, opining that it emphasized the story's humor and emotions, and concluded that the manga was "better paced and put together" than the light novels in a way that "makes a lot of difference." Similarly, Nicholas Dupree described the manga as an "enjoyable fantasy romp", with praise for Anisphia's character and crossover of genres.

In contrast, Friedman criticized the manga's first volume, calling it a "rough start" to the series, particularly in its portrayal of Euphyllia's backstory, which she felt was repetitive at times, as well as its fan service, which she disliked. However, she commended the illustrations, calling them "better than the [light novel] by a lot", and concluded that it was the "art here that makes this a perfectly fine read". Reviewing the second installment of the manga, Friedman described it as a "very good volume" that avoided the flaws of the first one.

==== Anime ====
The premiere episode of the anime adaptation was warmly received. Richard Eisenbeis of ANN praised it for "excellently laying out" the characters and setting while also being "wonderfully nuanced in its drama." Dupree concurred, calling it an "appealing watch that emphasizes the strongest aspects of the writing", while Vrai Kaiser of Anime Feminist commended the story's characterization of Anisphia as well as its comedy, describing the series as a "a breezy treat with a rambunctious, likable heroine".

The series' characters were praised by several critics. Caitlin Moore of ANN described Anisphia's and Euphyllia as "both so likable as individuals" that she was "eager to see what's to come". Gracie Qu of Anime Trending opined that the story "soars" with its character interactions, with Anisphia's and Euphyllia's relationship "develop[ing] beautifully", and was impressed by how the story explicitly showed the two protagonists' feelings for each other on-screen. Similarly, Kaiser commended the show for having an LGBTQ relationship as a central aspect of its plot.

The show's plot and pacing was generally well received. Eisenbeis praised the story's mixing of several genres, which he felt together "create an amazing anime that is far more than the sum of its parts", while Panos Kotzathanasis of Asian Movie Pulse spoke positively of the story's balance and transition between plot points. Regarding pacing, Qu was hesitant, feeling that much of the exposition was "simply not interesting", In contrast, Kaiser opined that the pacing, while sometimes "brisk", was well balanced between faster and slower moments.

The production value of the show was met with favorable reactions. Ken Pueyo of Anime Corner acclaimed one of the climactic fight scenes of the series, stating that "animation, pacing, writing, voice acting, and music were all woven together into perfection." James Beckett of ANN described the animation as "just really plain nice to look at", with praise for coloring and background art that he felt allowed it to "stand out amidst a sea of competition". Qu commended the voice acting in particular, writing that Sayaka Senbongi, Anisphia's voice actress, "gives one of her best performances for the most nuanced character of the series" and has "incredible chemistry" with Euphyllia's voice actress, Manaka Iwami.

The story's worldbuilding and themes were analyzed by multiple reviewers. Christopher Farris of ANN contended that while the series is isekai in nature, its use of reincarnation elements was simply "one well-utilized element among many", which he felt allowed it to stand out from similar series in the genre. Kaiser argued that Anisphia's "magicology" is "explicitly a narrative about class conflict", while Kotzathanasis suggested that the portrayal of the main characters' efforts to effect social change through technology was "one of the most interesting" aspects of the story.

Following the series' conclusion, Pueyo chose it as the best anime of the Winter 2023 season, praising the quality as "beyond what [he] could imagine", particularly in its story writing. Farris ranked it #4 on his list of 2023's best anime, describing it as "revolutionary compared to its contemporaries". Three reviewers from Anime Feminist named it as among the best anime of the year, with Kaiser calling it a "engaging, complete-feeling adaptation" produced with uncommon quality.

== See also ==
- Jack-of-All-Trades, Party of None, another light novel series with the same illustrator
