= Central Music & Entertainment Festival =

Japanese music festival

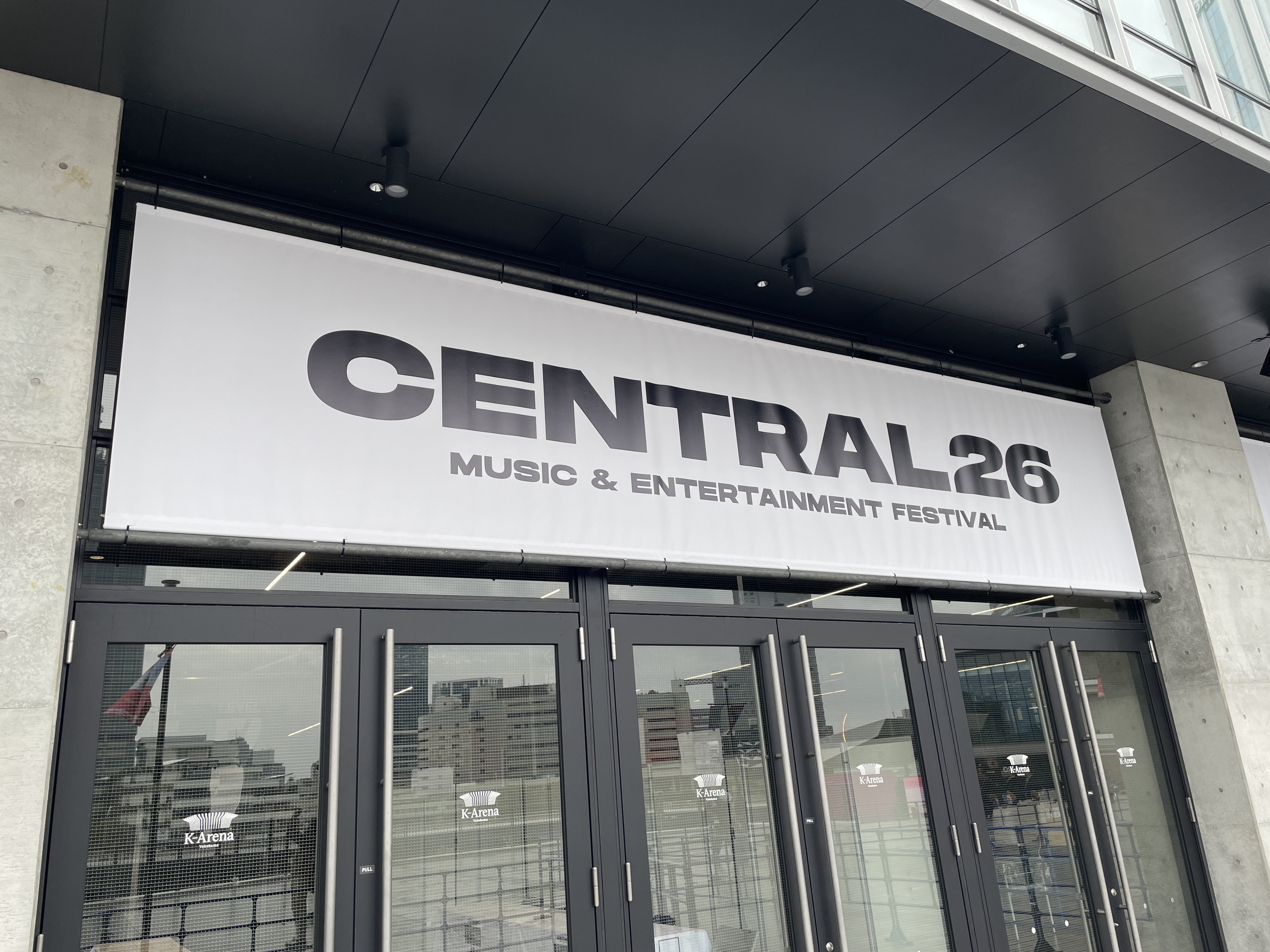
- Entrance at K-Arena Yokohama in 2026
- Genre: Various
- Frequency: Annually
- Locations: K-Arena Yokohama; Yokohama Red Brick Warehouse; KT Zepp Yokohama; Rinko Park (Yokohama, Kanagawa Prefecture, Japan); Zepp New Taipei (New Taipei, Taiwan); Zepp Kuala Lumpur (Kuala Lumpur, Malaysia)
- Years active: 2025–present
- Inaugurated: April 4, 2025; 19 months ago
- Attendance: 90,000 (2026)
- Organizer: Central Executive Committee
- Website: central-fest.com

The Central Music & Entertainment Festival, often referred to simply as Central, is an annual music festival, first held in 2025. It is organized by the Central Executive Committee and produced by Sony Music Entertainment Japan. With the concept of "bringing the sounds of Japan to the world", it is held for three days in April at four different venues in Yokohama, Kanagawa Prefecture—K-Arena Yokohama, Yokohama Red Brick Warehouse, KT Zepp Yokohama, and Rinko Park. Later, the festival expands to New Taipei, Taiwan, and Kuala Lumpur, Malaysia.

== Concept ==
The Central Executive Committee chose Yokohama, Kanagawa Prefecture for the festival due to the city's numerous music venues, with a variety of scales and characteristics, from arena-sized to live house-sized. Aligning with the event's concept of "bringing the sounds of Japan to the world", another reason is that the city has long been known as a port city since the Meiji era. The festival's key visual uses a simple square frame, symbolizing a shipping container, as Japan's connection to the world and also its commitment to sustainability, and everyone can repaint the frame with their own colors.

== History ==
On December 23, 2024, the Central Music & Entertainment Festival was announced. It was scheduled to be held over three days, from April 4 to 6, 2025, at four different venues throughout Yokohama: K-Arena Yokohama, Yokohama Red Brick Warehouse, KT Zepp Yokohama, and Rinko Park, alongside the first lineup. Each venue would feature a different artist lineup. On January 30, 2025, Central announced Echoes Baa stage, hosted by record label Echoes at Red Brick Park Special Venue, Yokohama Red Brick Warehouse. The next day, the festival formally announced three other stages: Central Stage at K-Arena Yokohama, Vival and New Gene Fest at KT Zepp Yokohama. Ticket sales for each venue and a one-day "all venue pass" began on the same day.

On March 11, it was announced that Central Field, a free-admission entertainment area, would be hosted at Rinko Park. The festival also partnered with Yokohama City and Yokohama City Visitors Bureau for the #Central_Yokohama campaign for photo spots throughout the city. The Vival stage was live-streamed via Stagecrowd, while otherwise through The First Take YouTube channel. The archive footages of all stages, except Vival, was released on April 7 and available for one week. In addition to Japan, Central also took place at Zepp New Taipei, New Taipei, Taiwan, and Zepp Kuala Lumpur, Kuala Lumpur, Malaysia on April 19 and 26, 2025, respectively.

The 2026 edition of Central Music & Entertainment Festival was announced on December 23, 2025, alongside its first lineup, and scheduled to take place between April 3 and 5, 2026. Three stages from the first edition—Central Stage, Echoes Baa, and Central Field—remained in 2026 and to be held at the same venues, while KT Zepp Yokohama hosted the new stage Central Lab. Ticket sales available on January 20. All stages also broadcast live through The First Take YouTube channel. and re-broadcast in late April for one week. The festival also collaborated with the small music festival Live! Yokohama, which held the same period and the same city, Hinatazaka46's Miku Kanemura for Kioku no Kakera exhibition, etc. The New Taipei and Kuala Lumpur shows returned on August 1 and 8, 2026, respectively.

== Stages and areas ==
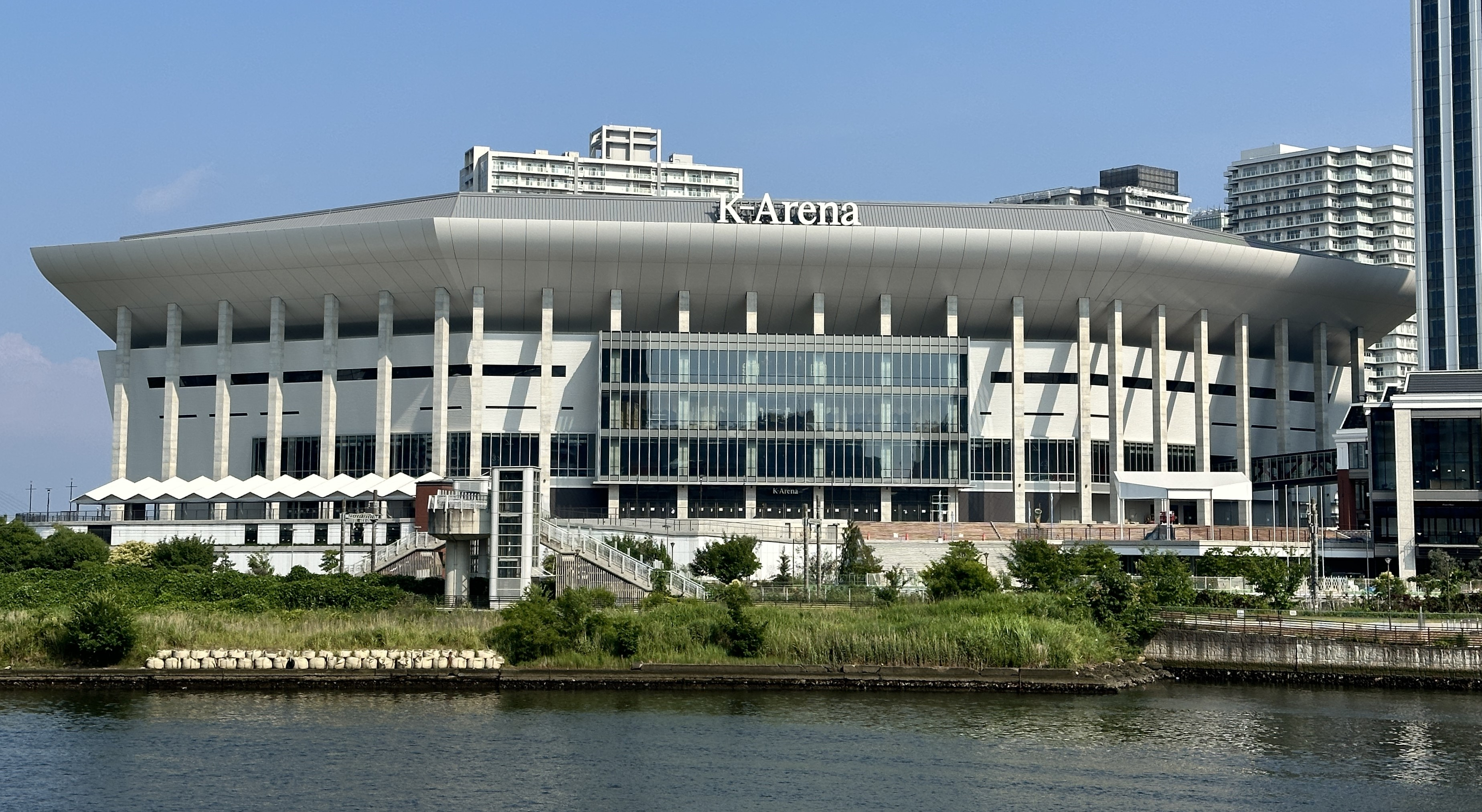
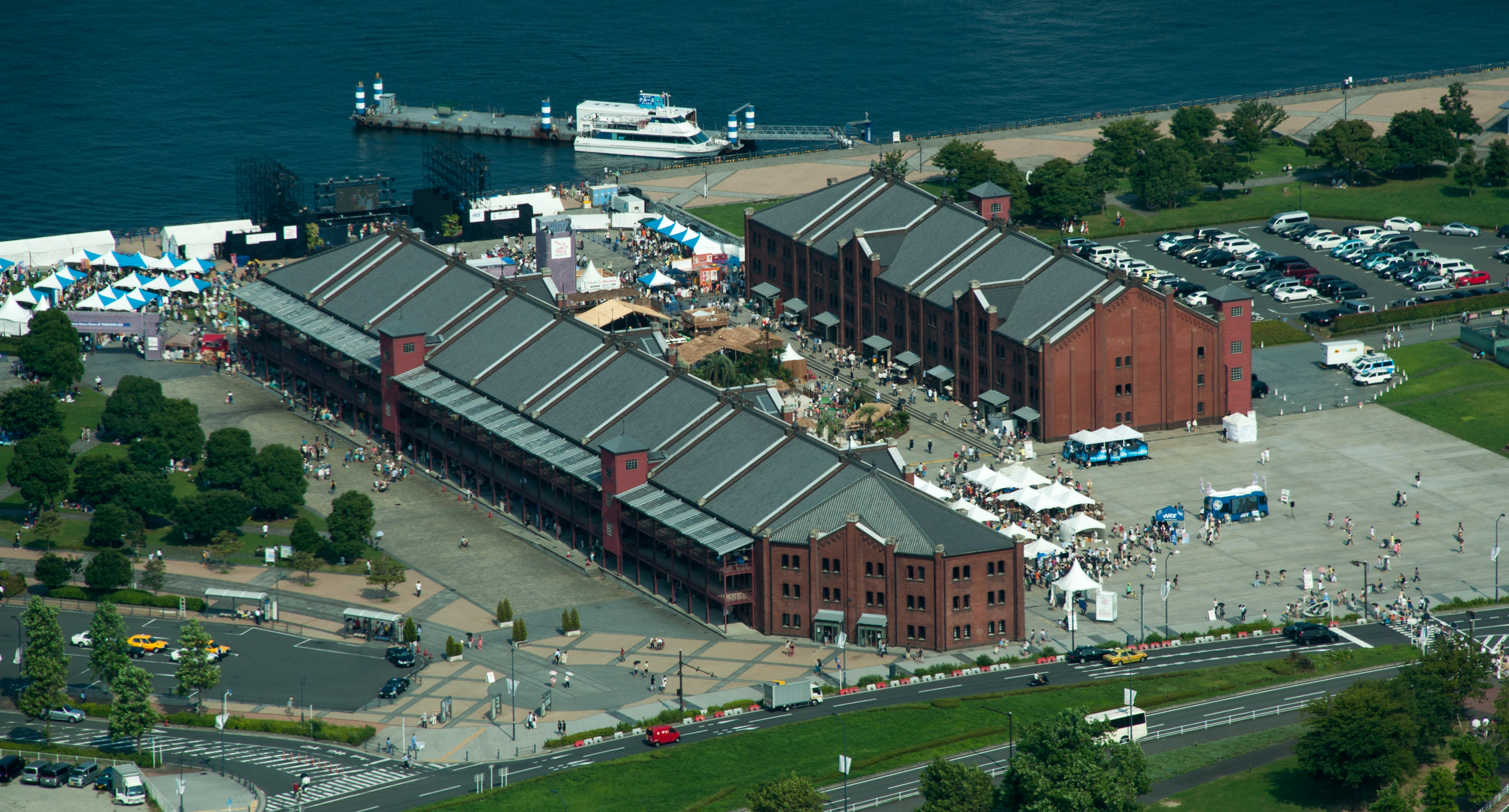
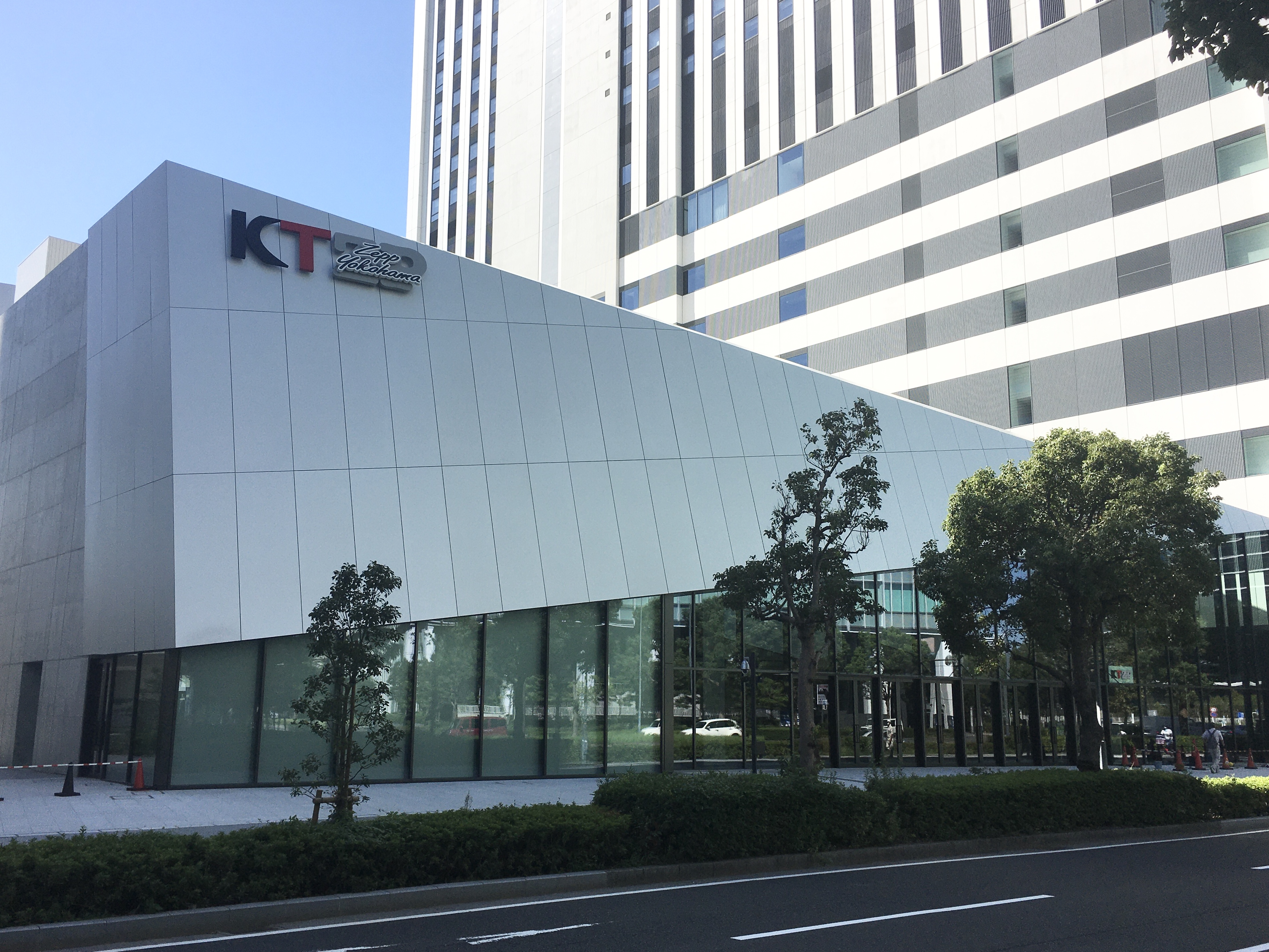
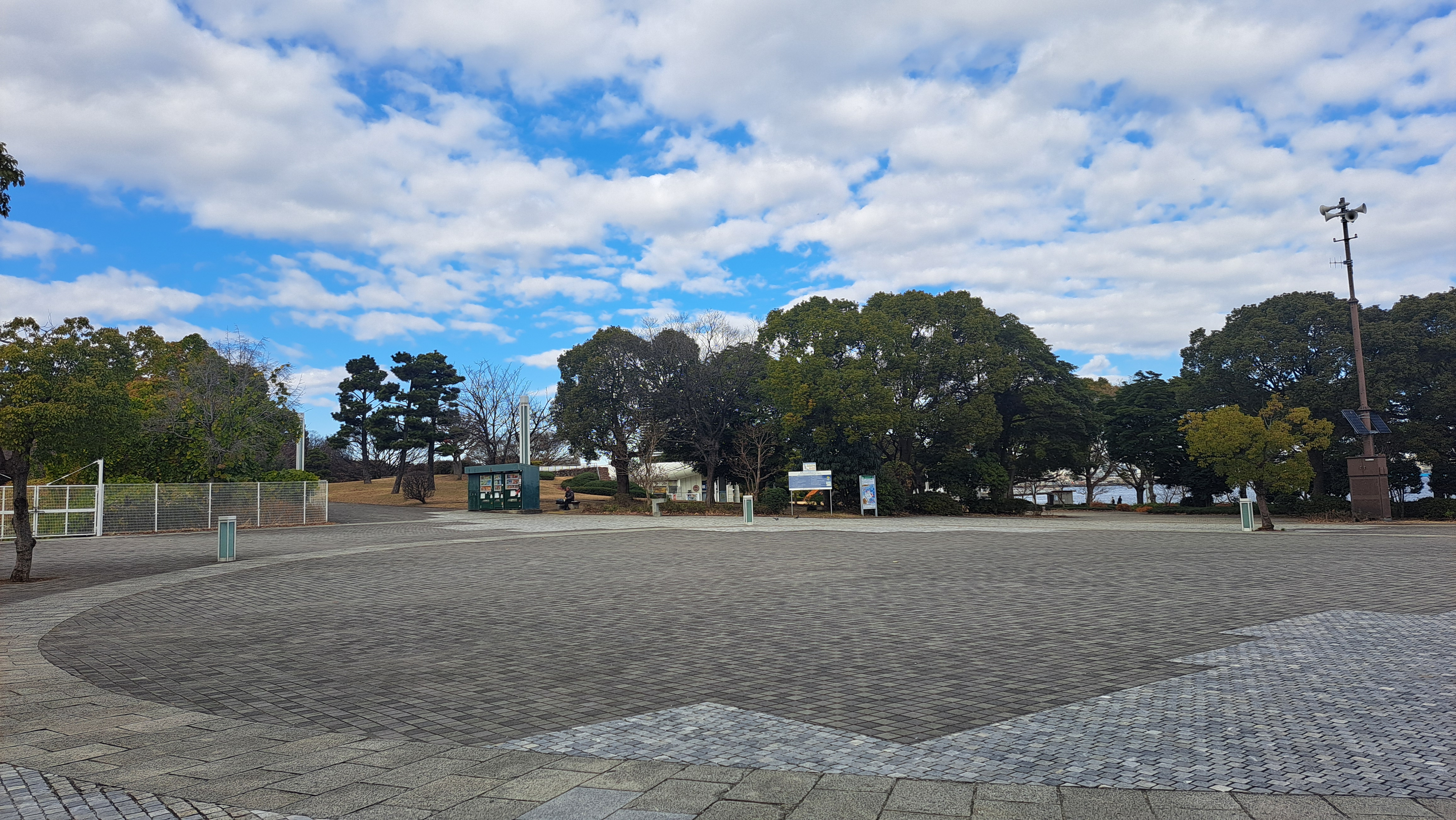
The venues held the Central festival: (left to right, top to bottom) K-Arena Yokohama, Yokohama Red Brick Warehouse, KT Zepp Yokohama, and Rinko Park

Current

- Central Stage (K-Arena Yokohama) – the main and largest stage, featuring representative Japanese artists and their collaborations
- Echoes Baa (Red Brick Park Special Venue, Yokohama Red Brick Warehouse) – Echoes-organized stage, featuring both in-house and outside artists
- Central Field (Rinko Park) – free admission entertainment area, including food, anime talk stages, character booths, and technology experiences, etc.
- Central Lab. (KT Zepp Yokohama) – an experimental stage which evolves from various perspectives and combinations

Former

- Viva (KT Zepp Yokohama) – collaborative stage between VTubers and real-world artists
- New Gene Fest (KT Zepp Yokohama) – new-generation artists' stage

== Summary ==
Year	Date	City	Country	Venue	Lineup	Attendance
2025	April 4	Yokohama	Japan	K-Arena Yokohama; Yokohama Red Brick Warehouse; KT Zepp Yokohama; Rinko Park	Central Stage: Nogizaka46; Ryokuoushoku Shakai	80,000 (offline); 1,500,000 (online)
2025	April 5	Yokohama	Japan	K-Arena Yokohama; Yokohama Red Brick Warehouse; KT Zepp Yokohama; Rinko Park	Central Stage: Tatsuya Kitani; Kessoku Band; Hayato Sumino; Echoes Baa: Maisondes; Syudou (special guest); Asmi (special guest); Nomelon Nolemon; Kafuné; Yoasobi; Viva: Reol; Himehana; Isekaijoucho; ClariS; Nanami Urara; Shiramata Utano; Akagimi; Kanade Mimi; Gununu Makenashi; Culua; Imi; Sumoa Amazura; Geppaku Liu; Näo; Amakomo Linon; Central Field: Bocchi the Rock! talk stage	80,000 (offline); 1,500,000 (online)
2025	April 6	Yokohama	Japan	K-Arena Yokohama; Yokohama Red Brick Warehouse; KT Zepp Yokohama; Rinko Park	Central Stage: Creepy Nuts; Awich; Yzerr; Hana; Echoes Baa: Yoasobi; Aooo; Tomoo (special guest); Chevon (special guest); Luov; Fruits Zipper (special guest); New Gene Fest: Rikon; Kiro Akiyama; Cody Lee; Conton Candy; Clan Queen; Central Field: Your Lie in April talk stage	80,000 (offline); 1,500,000 (online)
2025	April 19	New Taipei	Taiwan	Zepp New Taipei	Lineup: Sakurazaka46; Atarashii Gakko!; Hana; Tatsuya Kitani; J.Sheon (opening act)	
2025	April 26	Kuala Lumpur	Malaysia	Zepp Kuala Lumpur	Lineup: Creepy Nuts; Atarashii Gakko!; Tatsuya Kitani; K.O.I (opening act)	
2026	April 3	Yokohama	Japan	K-Arena Yokohama; Yokohama Red Brick Warehouse; KT Zepp Yokohama; Rinko Park	Central Stage: Nogizaka46; 6th Generation (opening act); Morning Musume 26'; Fruits Zipper; =Love	90,000 (offline)
2026	April 4	Yokohama	Japan	K-Arena Yokohama; Yokohama Red Brick Warehouse; KT Zepp Yokohama; Rinko Park	Central Stage: Orange Range; Kessoku Band; Ling Tosite Sigure; Amazarashi; Reira Ushio (opening act); Echoes Baa: Tatsuya Kitani; Atarashii Gakko!; Chico with HoneyWorks; Balming Tiger; Nomelon Nolemon; Awich; Yoasobi; Jo0ji (opening act); Central Lab.: Band-Maid; Ave Mujica; Reona	90,000 (offline)
2026	April 5	Yokohama	Japan	K-Arena Yokohama; Yokohama Red Brick Warehouse; KT Zepp Yokohama; Rinko Park	Central Stage: Chanmina; Yuuri; Hana; Mulasaki Ima (opening act); Echoes Baa: Hoshimachi Suisei; Hitsujibungaku; Maisondes; Asmi; Cutie Street; Candy Tune; Aooo; Kano (opening act); Central Lab.: Haruka Tomatsu; Kana Hanazawa; Central Field: Monogatari Series talk stage; Daemons of the Shadow Realm talk stage	90,000 (offline)
2026	August 1	Kuala Lumpur	Malaysia	Zepp Kuala Lumpur	Lineup: Kana-Boon; Tatsuya Kitani; Reona; Jo0ji; Kiora (opening act)	2,000 (offline)
2026	August 8	New Taipei	Taiwan	Zepp New Taipei	Lineup: Uverworld; Yama; Jo0ji	
