= Aooo =

Japanese rock band

- Origin: Tokyo, Japan
- Genre: Rock
- Years active: 2023–present
- Labels: Echoes; Sony Japan
- Members: Riko Ishino; Surii/Threee; Hikaru Yamamoto; Tsumiki
- Website: sonymusic.co.jp/artist/Aooo/

Aooo (Japanese pronunciation: [aɯː]) is a Japanese rock band formed in Tokyo in August 2023. It consists of Riko Ishino (lead vocals, guitar, synthesizer), Surii/Threee (guitar, backing vocals), Hikaru Yamamoto (bass guitar, backing vocals), and Tsumiki (drums). The band made their major-label debut with Echoes and Sony Music Entertainment Japan in October 2024 with their debut studio album Aooo.

== History ==
=== 2023–2024: Formation ===
Before the formation, Riko Ishino is a former vocalist of the rock band Akai Ko-en and Idol Renaissance; Surii/Threee and Tsumiki are Vocaloid producers, the latter is also a member of the duo Nomelon Nolemon; Hikaru Yamamoto is a supporting band member of Yoasobi and Momoiro Clover Z. Surii, Yamamoto, and Tsumiki decided to form Aooo and invited Ishino to join as the vocalist. The name refers to the members' blood type, being one A and three O. Aooo's formation was announced on August 24, 2023. The band debuted their live performance as a special guest for rock band Awkmiu's concert Gift Shop on September 16 at Shibuya Eggman, Tokyo, where they performed their original song "Apathy" for the first time.

Aooo originally planned to issue their first demo EP Demooo on March 6, 2024, at Live Natalie "Aooo × Hakubi × Chirinuruwowaka" concert at Duo Music Exchange in Shibuya. Still, it was postponed due to a malfunction at the manufacturing plant. However, the band prepared hand-burned CD-Rs of the demo for fans instead. Demooo was finally released on April 29 at the Electric Restaurant 127 show with Chakura. The next day, Aooo launched their YouTube channel.

=== 2024–present: Major-label debut ===
In September 2024, the band was signed to Sony Music Entertainment Japan's record label Echoes, and announced their major-label debut studio album Aooo. It included all tracks from Demooo and was released on October 16. To promote the album, they held the free concert Flash!!!! in Kabukichō on October 18, and embarked on their first concert tour, the Bowwow Live Tour, from December 2024 to January 2025. In January 2025, Aooo made their first television appearance at Buzz Rhythm 02. On April 16, the band released their first EP Fooocus, preceded by the single "Fragile Night", and included the ending theme for anime adaptation of manga series Witch Watch, "Find Your Magic". "Fragile Night" later served as a theme song for TX Network's drama series Ryōsan-gata Ruka.

Between July and September, Aooo released three standalone singles: "Yankeee", "Geeek", and "Crazzzy". In support of Fooocus, the band embarked on the second concert tour, the Bakubaku Live Tour, from September to October, and held the one-off concert, Bazoooka, at Tokyo Garden Theater on December 6. Following the concert, the band released "Star Sign" as the lead single for their second studio album Rooom, released on June 3, 2026, and supported by the Ringring Live Tour in May, and Budoookan concert in November. The album track "Polaris" featured on the Brawl Stars's animated video Kanojo ga Starr Nova ni Natta Wake. The band performed "Days!", which served as the ending theme for the 2026 original anime television series Grow Up Show.

== Members ==
- Riko Ishino – lead vocals, guitar, synthesizer
- Surii/Threee – guitar, backing vocals
- Hikaru Yamamoto – bass guitar, backing vocals
- Tsumiki – drums

== Discography ==
=== Studio albums ===
List of studio albums, showing selected details, chart positions, and sales
Title	Details	Peak positions			Sales
Title	Details	JPN	JPN Cmb.	JPN Hot	Sales
Aooo	Released: October 16, 2024; Label: Echoes, Sony Japan; Formats: CD, DL, streaming; Track listing: 1. "Flash Forward"; 2. "Salad Bowl" (サラダボウル); 3. "Yellowtoy" (イエロートイ); 4. "Apathy" (アパシー); 5. "Mermaid" (水中少女); 6. "Blue Smoke" (青い煙); 7. "More"; 8. "Casablanca"; 9. "Neo Wabishii" (ネオワビシイ); 10. "Neroli" (ネロリ); 11. "Repeat" (リピート); 12. "April" (エイプリル)	21	41	19	JPN: 2,233 (phy.)
Rooom	Released: June 3, 2026; Label: Echoes, Sony Japan; Formats: CD, DL, streaming; Track listing: 1. "Rezo"; 2. "Polaris" (ポラリス); 3. "Yankeee"; 4. "Fortune"; 5. "Blue Ride" (ブルーライド); 6. "Daydream" (ユメユキ); 7. "Geeek"; 8. "Call"; 9. "Crazzzy; 10. "Question" (クエスチョン); 11. "Portrait"; 12. "Find Your Magic" (魔法はスパイス); 13. "Star Sign" (スターサイン)	7	9	39	JPN: 11,390 (phy.)

=== Extended plays ===
List of extended plays, showing selected details, chart positions, and sales
Title	Details	Peaks		Sales
Title	Details	JPN	JPN Cmb.	Sales
Fooocus	Released: April 16, 2025; Label: Echoes, Sony Japan; Formats: CD, DL, streaming; Track listing: 1. "Find Your Magic" (魔法はスパイス); 2. "BAQN"; 3. "Sunset Memory Road" (黄昏メモリーロード); 4. "Fragile Night" (フラジャイル・ナイト)	10	13	JPN: 4,682 (phy.)

=== Demos ===
List of demos, showing selected details
Title	Details
Demooo	Released: March 6, 2024; Label: Self-release; Formats: CD; Track listing: 1. "Apathy" (アパシー); 2. "Yellowtoy" (イエロートイ); 3. "Repeat" (リピート); 4. "Blue Smoke" (青い煙)

=== Singles ===
List of singles, showing year released, selected chart positions, and album name
Title	Year	Peaks		Album
Title	Year	JPN	JPN Heat.	Album
"Apathy"	2024	—	—	Aooo
"Yellowtoy"	2024	—	—	Aooo
"Salad Bowl"	2024	—	—	Aooo
"Repeat"	2024	—	—	Aooo
"Blue Smoke"	2024	—	—	Aooo
"Fragile Night"	2025	—	—	Fooocus
"Yankeee"	2025	—	—	Rooom
"Geeek"	2025	—	—	Rooom
"Crazzzy"	2025	—	—	Rooom
"Star Sign"	2025	—	7	Rooom
"Question"	2026	—	—	Rooom
"Call"	2026	—	—	Rooom
"Days!"	2026	19	14	Non-album single
"—" denotes releases that did not chart or were not released in that region.

=== Video albums ===
List of video albums, showing selected details
Title	Details
Aooo Live Tour "Ringring" at Zepp Haneda (Tokyo)	Scheduled: December 2, 2026; Label: Echoes, Sony Japan; Formats: Blu-ray, CD

== Concerts ==
Tours

- Bowwow Live Tour (2024–2025)
- Bakubaku Live Tour (2025)
- Ringring Live Tour (2025)

One-off

- OneOneOne Live (2024)
- Flash!!!! (2024)
- Bazoooka Special Live (2025)
- Budoookan (2026)
