= Surii (musician) =

- Also known as: 3, Three, Threee
- Born: September 28, 1994 (age 32); Osaka Prefecture, Japan
- Genres: J-pop; electronica
- Occupations: Japanese producer, singer-songwriter, guitarist
- Instruments: Vocals, guitar
- Years active: 2018–present
- Member of: Aooo

Surii (すりぃ; born September 28, 1994), also known as Three, Threee (stylized in all caps), or 3, is a Japanese Vocaloid producer and singer-songwriter. He is known for his work in the Vocaloid community, with notable songs including "Telecaster B-Boy", "Ego Rock", "Junkie Night Town Orchestra", and "Lavie". He is also a member of the rock band Aooo and is a songwriter and producer for other artists, including Ado.

== Career ==
In 2017, Surii moved to Tokyo aiming to become a professional composer. On March 3, 2018, he began his career as a Vocaloid producer with his first song "Kūchū Bunkai", choosing the date as a wordplay on his name, since "Surii" (すりぃ) is pronounced like the number "three" in Japanese. Early in his career, he posted short videos of 60 seconds on Nico Nico Douga and YouTube, influenced by the 60-second video limit on Twitter at the time. Based on the audience's reception, he would expand them into longer versions.

His work quickly gained popularity, with his songs "Telecaster B-Boy" and "Junkie Night Town Orchestra" reaching millions of views on YouTube. In May 2020, he released his debut album, Pandemic. It was originally self-published and sold via doujin mail order before receiving a nationwide retail release. He uses VOCALOID software such as Kagamine Len and Hatsune Miku. Over time, his songs became more personal, leading him to transition to using his own vocals.

In August 2023, he began performing as the guitarist of the four-person rock band Aooo, formed with Riko Ishino, Hikaru Yamamoto, and tsumiki. In February 2024, his song "Telecaster B-Boy" was adapted into a novel by MF Bunko J. The novel was written by Surii himself, making it his debut full-length written work. In August of the same year, it was adapted into a manga and began serialization in the September issue of Monthly Comic Gene.

He is also a member of the Vocaloid producer group DREAMERS, which includes Ayase, syudou, and tsumiki; the members remix each other's songs.

== Personal life ==
Surii became interested in music during high school after being inspired by the anime K-On!. He played guitar in a band with his friends, covering songs from the series. He continued pursuing music while studying architecture in college and later dropped out to pursue music full-time.

He is often described as friendly and outgoing, though he has mentioned that his creative process tends to bring out a more introspective and darker side, as he reflects on his personal struggles. He enjoys watching older anime series such as Code Geass and Gundam, particularly the final episodes, which he re-watches frequently. He played the card game Duel Masters, which he competed in during his school years.

== Artistry ==
Surii's decision to work anonymously as a Vocaloid producer came from his experiences in bands and songwriting contests, where he felt pressured to meet others' expectations. He wanted a creative outlet that would allow him to express his feelings more freely. His musical style is influenced by wowaka, particularly in his use of guitar phrases and rhythmic patterns. He has also cited Hidekazu Tanaka as an influence, especially for his ability to combine complex chord progressions with pop melodies. Surii has stated that he aims to create his own signature sound by using the same instrument samples repeatedly in his songs.

He finds collaborators through a dedicated Twitter account, where he follows only illustrators and video creators. He often prefers working with emerging or lesser-known artists, seeking out fresh talent for his projects.

== Discography ==
=== Digital-only single ===
Release date	Title
April 28, 2021	Anzu no Hana (feat. Nene)
May 26, 2021	Anzu no Hana
June 30, 2021	Hebiringo (feat. Nene)
July 28, 2021	Hebiringo
September 7, 2021	Ego Rock (long ver.)
November 27, 2021	Chameleon
December 11, 2021	Chameleon (Surii ver.)
January 3, 2022	Fukurou-san
January 21, 2022	Fukurou-san (Surii ver.)
February 25, 2022	Bunny
March 3, 2022	Bunny (Surii ver.)
June 24, 2022	Zebra
September 28, 2022	Zebra (Surii ver.)
December 24, 2022	Lavie (Surii ver.)
January 28, 2023	Downtime
February 17, 2023	Downtime (Surii ver.)
March 26, 2023	Jitabata
April 30, 2023	Biribiri
May 19, 2023	Wakarebana
June 23, 2023	Hanamizuki
July 14, 2023	Chūdoku-sei no Chū
September 28, 2023	Baka ni Natte
April 6, 2024	Guilty
June 23, 2024	Chemical Dance
August 17, 2024	Obeka
September 28, 2024	Obeka (Surii ver.)
November 13, 2024	Obeka (Sped Up ver.)
December 18, 2024	Sukutte Kurenai
February 2, 2025	Cho Peace
September 9, 2025	KISS&CANDY
June 9, 2026	Chewing Gum feat. KANA-BOON

=== Mini-album ===
#	Release Date	Title	Tracks
1st	March 2, 2019	Collage	1. Kūchū Bunkai long ver.; 2. Ego Rock long ver.; 3. Alternative Blue
2nd	May 23, 2019	Paradox	1. Telecaster B-Boy (album ver）; 2. Hyōri Ittai; 3. Ego Rock long (Hatsune Miku); 4. 1/100 no Ai; 5. Iwakan

=== Albums ===
#	Release date	Title	Tracks
1st	May 1, 2020	PANDEMIC	1. Dropout Jinseigaku; 2. Junky Night Town Orchestra; 3. Telecaster B-Boy (long ver.); 4. Kūchū Bunkai (Pandemic ver.); 5. Lonely Children (long ver.); 6. Morning Loop; 7. Tapioca; 8. Beaver; 9. Norua Dorua A 10. Norua Dorua B 11. Chume~mu; 12. Watashi, Kekkyoku Netto ni Jūjun
2nd	November 14, 2023	GRADATION	1. Jitabata; 2. Biribiri; 3. Chūdoku-sei no Chū; 4. Enjō janai?; 5. Baka ni Natte; 6. Wakarebana; 7. Hanamizuki; 8. Hana to Gradation; 9. Mr. Hero; 10. Sara

=== Self-cover album ===
#	Release date	Title	Tracks
1st	March 3, 2021	HEAUTOSCOPY	1. Kūchū Bunkai; 2. Ego Rock; 3. Telecaster B-Boy; 4. Junky Night Town Orchestra; 5. Beaver

== Songwriting and production credits ==
Release date	Title	Artist	Role
August 26, 2020	Amabie	Gero	Lyrics, Composition, Arrangement
September 9, 2020	Antithesis	Shiina Natsukawa	Lyrics, Composition, Arrangement
October 14, 2020	Moratorium Gunzōgeki	BARELY LEGAL WONDER	Lyrics, Composition, Arrangement
October 14, 2020	Sayonara no Daishō	BARELY LEGAL WONDER	Lyrics, Composition, Arrangement
October 14, 2020	17（EP limited track）	BARELY LEGAL WONDER	Lyrics, Composition, Arrangement
October 30, 2020	Unhappy Halloween	Ghost Mania	Lyrics, Composition, Arrangement
November 22, 2020	R Yuk	KANKAN	Lyrics, Composition, Arrangement
December 18, 2020	Room No. 4	Chogakusei	Lyrics, Composition, Arrangement
December 23, 2020	7-gatsu no Cider	Cho Tokimeki Sendenbu	Arrangement
December 24, 2020	Readymade	Ado	Lyrics, Composition, Arrangement
May 31, 2021	Kodoku-no-Nettaiya	Lila Gray	Lyrics, Composition, Arrangement
June 16, 2021	Kakusei Noisy	ARAKI	Lyrics, Composition, Arrangement
July 4, 2021	Kamisama Harassment	THE BINARY	Lyrics, Composition, Arrangement
August 18, 2021	Mage of Violet	Murasaki Shion	Arrangement
August 20, 2021	Darling Blue	luz	Lyrics, Composition, Arrangement
September 29, 2021	ReAnswer	Soraru	Lyrics, Composition, Arrangement
October 13, 2021	Wink	Yuya Tegoshi	Lyrics, Composition, Arrangement
October 20, 2021	Pain Perdu	Senra	Lyrics, Composition, Arrangement
October 20, 2021	Zettai Koakuma Koode	ano	Lyrics, Composition, Arrangement
November 24, 2021	Frustration	Rib	Lyrics, Composition, Arrangement
January 18, 2022	AKUMA	Tokoyami Towa	Lyrics, Composition, Arrangement
January 19, 2022	Melty	Nanamori.	Lyrics, Composition, Arrangement
January 19, 2022	Kagirinaku Haiiro e	Nightcord at 25:00	Lyrics, Composition, Arrangement
February 16, 2022	Yankee Dance	Akari Nanawo	Lyrics, Composition, Arrangement
February 22, 2022	Check Night	Tonari no Sakata.	Lyrics, Composition, Arrangement
April 27, 2022	Ikkaku Bonus Gambler	SiN	Lyrics, Composition, Arrangement
May 2, 2022	RingRing	Beardoord	Arrangement
May 16, 2022	Stigma	Beardoord	Lyrics, Composition, Arrangement
May 23, 2022	heterodox	Beardoord	Lyrics, Composition, Arrangement
June 1, 2022	Lip	Minori Suzuki	Lyrics, Composition, Arrangement
July 4, 2022	Campanula Boy	Rao	Lyrics, Composition, Arrangement
July 6, 2022	Sharara	Urashimasakatasen	Lyrics, Composition, Arrangement
July 13, 2022	Bug ttenai?	MABODOFU	Lyrics, Composition, Arrangement
July 27, 2022	Teenage Diver	Ami Sakaguchi	Lyrics
August 5, 2022	Dorothy	KANKAN × Chogakusei	Lyrics, Composition, Arrangement
September 7, 2022	Yamiyada	Gero	Lyrics, Composition, Arrangement
October 12, 2022	Psycho	Chogakusei	Lyrics, Composition, Arrangement
October 12, 2022	Makeinu no Revenge	Amatsuki	Lyrics, Composition, Arrangement
January 10, 2023	Warauna!	syudou	Arrangement
June 28, 2023	Pabo	Okayu Nekomata	Lyrics, Composition, Arrangement
July 10, 2023	Kakuriyo	luz	Lyrics, Composition
November 25, 2023	Itazuranya!	Shirogane Noel	Lyrics, Composition, Arrangement
November 28, 2023	Holohawk	Takane Lui	Lyrics, Composition, Arrangement
March 27, 2024	Incubator	Chogakusei	Lyrics, Composition, Arrangement
April 9, 2024	Meritocracy	Aimi	Lyrics, Composition, Arrangement
July 31, 2024	GYARU	Nene	Lyrics, Composition, Arrangement
October 22, 2024	Kocchi Muite Hoi	asmi	Lyrics, Composition, Arrangement
November 30, 2024	Modoku	Sakamata Chloe	Lyrics, Composition, Arrangement
January 7, 2025	Ame Tokimeki Koimoyou	AyaFubuMi	Lyrics, Composition, Arrangement

=== Collaborations ===
Release date	Title	Album/Release
June 15, 2022	OverDriver (Surii Remix)	Sukima Switch – Single Release
January 6, 2023	I Wanna Muchuu feat. asmi, Surii	Maisondes, from the album Noisy Love Songs
December 27, 2023	Jankenhoi! feat. #kzn	PathTLive, from the album Perfect World!!
