= Gira Gira =

2021 single by Ado

Single by Ado

from the album Kyōgen
- Language: Japanese
- Released: February 14, 2021
- Length: 4:36
- Label: Virgin
- Songwriter: Teniwoha
- Producer: Teniwoha

Ado singles chronology
"Readymade" (2020)	"Gira Gira" (2021)	"Odo" (2021)

Music video
- "Gira Gira" on YouTube

"Gira Gira" (Japanese: ギラギラ; lit. 'glare') is a song recorded by Japanese singer Ado, released on February 14, 2021, via Virgin Music.

== Background and release ==
After releasing her 2020 debut single "Usseewa", which garnered debate from late Shōwa and early Heisei era generations due to its lyrical content, Ado released her follow-up single "Readymade" in December 2020. In February 2021, she announced her third major label single, "Gira Gira".

Released on February 14, 2021, "Gira Gira" was written and produced by Vocaloid producer Teniwoha.

== Commercial performance ==
"Gira Gira" initially debuted at number 39 on the Billboard Japan Download Songs chart for the week of February 22, 2021. For the chart week of March 1, 2021, "Gira Gira" debuted and peaked at number 12 on the Japan Hot 100.

== Music video ==
A music video for "Gira Gira" premiered on Ado's official YouTube channel on February 14, 2021, with illustrations by Numata Zombie. The music video amassed over 4 million views in one week after its release.

== Personnel ==
- Ado – vocals
- Teniwoha – arrangement, production
- Naoki Itai – mixing

== Charts ==
=== Weekly charts ===
Weekly chart performance for "Gira Gira"
Chart (2021)	Peak position
Japan (Japan Hot 100)	12
Japan Combined Singles (Oricon)	14

=== Year-end charts ===
Year-end chart performance for "Gira Gira"
Chart (2021)	Position
Japan (Japan Hot 100)	33

== Certifications ==
Certifications for "Gira Gira"
Region	Certification	Certified units/sales
Japan (RIAJ)	Gold	100,000^{*}
Streaming
Japan (RIAJ)	2× Platinum	200,000,000^{†}
^{*} Sales figures based on certification alone.^{†} Streaming-only figures based on certification alone.

== Release history ==
Release history and formats for "Gira Gira"
Region	Date	Format	Label	Ref.
Various	February 14, 2021	Digital download; streaming	Virgin	
