= Readymade (Ado song) =

Single by Ado

from the album Kyōgen
- Language: Japanese
- Released: December 24, 2020
- Genre: J-pop
- Length: 4:04
- Label: Virgin
- Songwriter: Surii
- Producer: Surii

Ado singles chronology
"Usseewa" (2020)	"Readymade" (2020)	"Gira Gira" (2021)

Music video
- "Readymade" on YouTube

"Readymade" (Japanese: レディメイド, Hepburn: Redimeido) is a song by Japanese singer Ado from her debut studio album Kyōgen (2022). It was released as a single on December 24, 2020, through Virgin Music. The song was written and produced by Vocaloid producer Surii. "Readymade" was used as the ending theme for the news show Abema Prime in February 2022.

== Track listing ==
- Digital download and streaming
1. "Readymade" – 4:04
2. "Usseewa" (piano version) – 3:43

== Charts ==
Chart performance for "Readymade"
Chart (2021)	Peak position
Japan (Japan Hot 100)	65
