= Akai Ko-en =

Japanese rock band

- Origin: Tokyo, Japan
- Genres: Indie rock; Alternative rock; J-pop; Shoegazing; Post-rock
- Years active: 2010–2021
- Labels: EMI Music Japan (2012–2013); Virgin Records (2014); Universal Music Japan (2015–2019); Epic Records Japan (2019–2021)
- Past members: Maisa Tsuno (guitar, keyboards, chorus); Chiaki Satō (vocals); Hikari Fujimoto (bass); Nao Utagawa (drums, chorus); Riko Ishino (vocals)
- Website: www.akaiko-en.com

Akai Ko-en (Japanese: 赤い公園, Hepburn: Akai Kōen; meaning "Red Park") was a Japanese rock band formed in Tachikawa, Tokyo, in 2010. The original line-up consisted of Chiaki Satō, Maisa Tsuno, Hikari Fujimoto and Nao Utagawa. After Sato left the band in 2017, Riko Ishino joined as the new vocalist in 2018.

Most of Akai Ko-en's songs were written and composed by the leader of the band, Maisa Tsuno, with few exceptions. Their songs clearly show Tsuno's musical influences and range, going from complex compositions with the use of counterpoint and cross-rhythm to straightforward J-pop.

Following the death of Tsuno in 2020, the group disbanded on 28 May 2021.

== History ==
=== Formation and first mini-albums (2010–2012) ===
The band was formed in January 2010 by school friends Hikari Fujimoto (bass) and Nao Utagawa (drums, vocals) in Tachikawa, Tokyo. Chiaki Sato (vocals) and Maisa Tsuno (guitar, vocals) joined later.

At the time, the band mainly played covers of artists like Tokyo Jihen. Chatmonchy, Kimura Kaela and GO!GO!7188, among others, but started composing their own songs after Tsuno joined. They started performing at the Tachikawa Babel live house, and became known for performing wearing only white clothes. According to Tsuno, this was because it made them more confident and motivated on stage.

In January 2011, the band released their first indie demo, Hajimemashite. (はじめまして; "Nice to meet you"), containing two tracks. Two months later, their first indie mini-album, Bremen to aruku (ブレーメンとあるく a.k.a. Walk with Bremen) was released. In October the same year, the band was invited to tour at Next Music from Tokyo vol.3, a Canadian music festival that aims to introduce up-and-coming bands from Tokyo.

In February 2012, the band signed to EMI Music Japan and released their first major mini-album Tōmei nanoka kuro nanoka (透明なのか黒なのか), while its counterpart, Laundry de hyōhaku o (ランドリーで漂白を) followed in May 2012. Both were produced by Tsuno.

=== Hiatus and Kōen Debut (2012–2013) ===
Later it was announced that the band would release three consecutive singles, but the band entered a hiatus after the release of the first one in September 2012, "Nozoki-ana" (のぞき穴), due to Tsuno's poor health.

Tsuno continued to compose during all 8 months of hiatus, while the other three members continued their own musical activities. In March 2013, the band was back to the recording studio for the single "Imasara/Kōshin/Sayonara wa iwanai" (今更/交信/さよならは言わない) and their first full-album, Kōen Debut (公園デビュー), both produced by Tsuno herself. The band also resumed live activities by May 2013 and continued to perform regularly at live venues and festivals until the break-up.

=== Mōretsu Rhythmics and Junjō Randoseru (2014–2016) ===
The single "Kaze ga shitteru" (風が知ってる) was the first to not have been produced by Tsuno – instead, it was produced and co-arranged by Seiji Kameda of Tokyo Jihen. Following this release, the band actively collaborated with a variety of producers, including Kōichi Tsutaya (蔦谷好位置) and Shūta Hasunuma (蓮沼執太). The following single, "Zettaiteki na kankei/Kikkake/Tooku Tooku" (絶対的な関係/きっかけ/遠く遠く) was released in March 2014 and also produced by Seiji Kameda. The lead track was featured as the theme song of Fuji TV's drama Lost Days and became their highest-charting single at 20th.

"Cider" (サイダー) and "Now on Air" were released as digital singles preceding the release of their 2nd album, Mōretsu Rhythmics (猛烈リトミック). This album included all four previously released singles and was said to be more "approachable" if compared to the previous album and mini-albums released by the band. It won the prize of "Outstanding Album Award" of 2014 on Japan Record Awards.

After touring Japan from Fall 2014 through Summer 2015, the band released their 7th single, "KOIKI", in November 2015. "Canvas" followed in February 2016. Both lead songs were included in their third album Junjō Randoseru (純情ランドセル) released in March 2016. Reflecting on the previously released Mōretsu Rhythmics, Tsuno believed they could make an even more approachable album, with memorable melodies and choruses. With that in mind, for this album they worked with producers who regularly produced hit songs in Japan.

=== New colors and Sato's departure (2017–2018) ===
In January 2017, a new single was announced. Released in February, "Yamiyo ni Chōchin" (闇夜に提灯), was produced by Koichi Tsutaya and used as the theme song for TBS's drama Rental Lovers. It was also announced that two more singles would follow: "Koi to Uso" (恋と嘘) released in April and "Journey" in June.

On 3 July 2017, it was announced on the official website that vocalist Chiaki Sato would be leaving the band. 4th album Nesshō Summer (熱唱サマー) was also announced to be released on 23 August, along with one final live concert including Sato on the line-up. After having performed one night only together with several guest musicians, Sato officially left the band.

After being quiet for some time, Akai Ko-en performed over 20 new songs live with the three remaining members on January 4 (the band's anniversary), 2018. Having no vocalist, the members would alternate the singing parts and swap their main instruments among themselves. They later reflected on the experience and realized the need of a 4th member in order to continue performing as Akai Ko-en. It was then that auditions were held for a new lead-vocalist. After the release of the compilation album Sekihan (赤飯) on 14 February the same year, the contract with Universal Music Japan expired.

=== 2nd line-up and The Park (2018–2020) ===
On 2 May 2018, the band announced that they would perform at Viva La Rock 2018 with a new lead-vocalist. On the stage, Riko Ishino, formerly from idol group Idol Renaissance (アイドルネッサンス) was introduced as the new lead-vocalist. As Ishino was still a high-school student and based in Hiroshima at that point, they had to limit their activity as a band to allow her to continue her studies. However, their first music video with Ishino, "Kienai" (消えない) was released in October of the same year. The song would later be released as the lead track from an EP of the same name, and performed on a live tour, at live venues and festivals. Still, it wasn't until May 2019 that they signed with a new label.

After signing up with Epic Records Japan, the band released Kienai - EP (消えない - EP) on October 23, which includes songs previously released as music videos and completely produced by Tsuno herself, once again. The band started the Fuyu Tour 2019 "Yo-Ho" in November to promote this release. In January 2020, the single "Zettai reido" (絶対零度) was released, with the title-track being chosen as the ending theme song for the anime Drifting Dragons.

On 15 April 2020, the band's 5th full album The Park was released. It was the first full-album with Ishino and all songs were produced by Tsuno. A tour was announced for May, however, it was cancelled due to the COVID-19 pandemic. The band then performed on a streaming live concert at Tachikawa Babel, in August. This performance turned-out to be the last with Maisa Tsuno.

=== Tsuno's death, final concert and disbandment (2020–2021) ===
On 18 October 2020, leader and guitarist Maisa Tsuno passed away. She was found lying in her home and taken to the hospital, where she was confirmed dead. The cause of death has not been disclosed.

On 25 November, their last single "Orange/pray" (オレンジ/pray) was posthumously released, along with two music videos. The band was booked to play live at the Countdown Japan 20/21 music festival in December, with the support from Yūsuke Koide (guitar) from Base Ball Bear, but the event was also cancelled due to the pandemic.

On 1 March 2021, the band announced that they would disband following a final concert The Last Live, on 28 May 2021. Base Ball Bear's Yūsuke Koide (guitar), tricot's Kida Motifour (guitar) and Hiroki Horiko a.k.a. hico (keyboards) were invited as support members. The concert, held at Nakano Sun Plaza Hall, had an in-person audience and was streamed live worldwide.

A blu-ray disc containing the concert was released on 29 September 2021.

== Members ==
- Maisa Tsuno (津野 米咲, Tsuno Maisa) – guitar, keyboards and chorus (2010–2020)

Born on 2 October 1991, Tsuno was the leader of the band and the one who composed and wrote most songs.

She grew up in a musical household, and started playing the electone when she was 3 years old. A self-proclaimed music fanatic, some of her musical influences are Tchaikovsky, Jim O'Rourke, Sheena Ringo and many J-Pop artists. Before joining Akai Ko-en, she played in a shoegaze band that covered Tokyo Incidents's songs, but with no keyboards. Her first guitar was a white Fender Stratocaster. Tsuno had also composed and written for many other artists throughout her career, including several Hello!Project groups and remarkably SMAP's Joy!!, which she became first known for. She died in 2020, at 29 years old.

- Chiaki Sato (佐藤 千明, Satō Chiaki) – vocals, keyboards (2010–2017)

Born on 14 January 1993, Sato was from the same class as Fujimoto and Utagawa. Before being invited to join the band, she was in the badminton club at school. From an young age, Sato mostly listened to girl band Morning Musume and wished she could join them. After leaving Akai Ko-en in 2017, she started a solo career in 2018 under the name Chiaki (チアキ).

- Hikari Fujimoto (藤本 ひかり, Fujimoto Hikari) – bass (2010–2021)

Born on 30 October 1992, Fujimoto started playing the bass guitar at 15 years old after joining the pop music club at her high school, since no one else wanted to play it. Despite being left-handed, she plays a regular right-handed model . Her main instrument is a green jazz bass by Freedom Custom Guitar Research that she has been using since 2012 or so, along with a MARSHALL SUPER BASS 100 amplifier and several effects pedals. She used to play the bass for hardcore band World In The Silence until August 2012. Fujimoto mostly listened to western music and hip hop as a child, but enjoyed metal and j-pop as well. Her interest in metal music is reflected on her bass playing style, with a frequent use of effects pedals.

- Nao Utagawa (歌川 菜穂, Utagawa Nao) – drums, chorus (2010–2021)

Born on 28 August 1992, Utagawa's musical life started very early. She started (unwillingly) learning the electone from her sister, at age 7 to 8. At age 10 to 11, she became interested in music when she learned about brass instruments from a college student. Due to that, she started playing drums at her elementary school brass band. At the time, she mostly listened to J-Pop and video game music. Utagawa continued to study drum playing at the Technos International College even after Akai Ko-en signed with EMI Music Japan. She also occasionally played the keyboards on stage.

In February 2022, Utagawa joined Japanese Rock/Alternative band The 2.

- Riko Ishino (石野 理子, Ishino Riko) – vocals (2018–2021)

Born on 29 October 2000 in Hiroshima, Ishino was the last member to join the band. She was previously a member of idol group Idol Renaissance (アイドルネッサンス). After her group having disbanded in February 2018, she participated in auditions to join Akai Ko-en and was promptly chosen by the members because of her clear voice and proper way of singing. In May 2018, Ishino officially joined the band after performing with the band at the Viva La Rock music festival. She was still in high school at the time.

== Discography ==
=== Albums ===
Title	Release date	Format	Label	Code	Peak
Kōen Debut (公園デビュー)	14 August 2013	CD	EMI Music Japan	TOCT-29184	27
Mōretsu Rhythmics (猛烈リトミック)	24 September 2014	CD	Virgin Music	TYCT-69023	27
Junjō Randoseru (純情ランドセル)	23 March 2016	CD	Universal J	UPCH-7119	27
Nesshō Summer (熱唱サマー)	23 August 2017	CD	Universal J	UPCH-7343	15
The Park	15 April 2020	CD	Epic Records Japan	ESCL 5383~4	13

=== Mini albums ===
Title	Release date	Format	Label	Code	Peak
Bremen to aruku (ブレーメンとあるく)	1 March 2011	CD	-	-	-
Tōmei nanoka kuro nanoka (透明なのか黒なのか)	15 February 2012	CD	EMI Music Japan	TOCT-28036	89
Laundry de hyōhaku o (ランドリーで漂白を)	9 May 2012	CD	EMI Music Japan	TOCT-28054	70

=== EP ===
Title	Release date	Format	Label	Code	Peak
Kienai - EP (消えない - EP)	23 October 2019	CD	Epic Records Japan	ESCL 5167	26

=== Demo ===
Title	Release date	Format	Label
Hajimemashite (はじめまして)	1 January 2011	CD	-

=== Singles ===
Title	Release date	Label	Format	Code	Peak	Album
Nozoki-ana (のぞき穴)	19 September 2012	EMI Music Japan	CD	TOCT-40457	89	Kōen Debut (album version)
Imasara/Kōshin/Sayonara wa iwanai (今更/交信/さよならは言わない)	3 July 2013	EMI Music Japan	CD	TOCT-45074	40	Kōen Debut
Kaze ga shitteru/Hitsujiya-san (風が知ってる/ひつじ屋さん)	12 February 2014	EMI Music Japan	CD	TYCT-39013	49	Mōretsu Rhythmics
Zettaiteki na kankei/Kikkake/Tooku Tooku (絶対的な関係/きっかけ/遠く遠く)	12 March 2014	EMI Music Japan	CD	TYCT-39014	20	Mōretsu Rhythmics
Cider (サイダー)	31 July 2014	Virgin Music	Digital	-		Mōretsu Rhythmics
Now on Air	27 August 2014	Virgin Music	Digital	-		Mōretsu Rhythmics
Koiki	25 November 2015	Universal J	CD	UPCH-7079	74	Junjō Randoseru
Canvas	24 February 2016	Universal J	CD	UPCH-7115	51	Junjō Randoseru
Yamiyo ni chōchin (闇夜に提灯)	15 February 2017	Universal J	CD	UPCH-7221	44	Nesshō Summer
Koi to uso (恋と嘘)	19 April 2017	Universal J	CD	UPCH-7247	51	Nesshō Summer
journey	21 June 2017	Universal J	CD	UPCH-7323	57	Nesshō Summer
Rinrin Ranran (凛々爛々)	21 August 2019	Epic Records Japan	Digital	-		Kienai - EP
Zettai reido (絶対零度)	29 January 2020	Epic Records Japan	CD	ESCL 5209	37	The Park
Orange/pray (オレンジ/pray)	25 November 2020	Epic Records Japan	CD	ESCL 5456	27	-

=== Compilation album ===
Title	Release date	Format	Label	Code	Peak
Sekihan (赤飯)	14 February 2018	CD	Universal J	UPCH-7392	23

=== Other appearances ===
Title	Release date	Format	Album	Code	Additional info
Part of Your World	22 January 2014	CD	Disney Rocks!!! - Girls Power!	AVCW-63008	From "The Little Mermaid"; Composed/written by Alan Menken/Howard Ashman.
Trouble Maker (トラブルメイカー)	3 December 2014	CD	A-Rock Nation - Nanase Aikawa Tribute	AVCD-93054	Written and Composed by Tetsuro Oda.
Hachimitsu (ハチミツ)	23 December 2015	CD	JUST LIKE HONEY - "Hachimitsu" 20th Anniversary Tribute	UPCH-2065	Written and Composed by Masamune Kusano (Spitz).
Hikari no hou e (光の方へ)	6 June 2018	CD	Do me a favor	EPCE-7408	Airi Suzuki x Akai Ko-en (鈴木愛理×赤い公園); Written and composed by Maisa Tsuno.
