= Hump Back =

Japanese rock band

- Origin: Higashiōsaka, Osaka, Japan
- Genre: Rock
- Years active: 2009–present
- Labels: Well Bucket; VAP; Hayashi Ongaku Kyōshitsu; Echoes
- Members: Momoko Hayashi; Pika; Misaki
- Past members: Megu; Yukkii; 373; Kanna
- Website: www.humpbackofficial.com

Hump Back (Japanese: ハンプバック, Hepburn: Hampubakku) is a Japanese all-female rock band formed in Higashiōsaka, Osaka in 2009. Lead vocalist and guitarist Momoko Hayashi has been the only constant member, with bassist Pika and drummer Misaki completing the lineup since 2016.

== Outline ==
Momoko Hayashi, an original member and the founder of the band and the songwriter of all songs, plays as the lead vocal and a lead guitar. Pika on chorus and bass guitar and Misaki on chorus and drums. Momoko Hayashi sings also solo on the acoustic guitar.

After forming in 2009 by Momoko Hayashi and her friends as high school students, influenced by Chatmonchy, the band continued its activities, despite a lot of difficulties like member changes. After the present members joined, the band got its major debut in 2018 and the major debut single CD Haikei shonen yo has reached number 13 on the Weekly Oricon Album Charts (prestigious Japanese music market popularity ranking) and other following released CDs also ranked highly on the Weekly charts.

The songs, created by Momoko Hayashi, are mainly about people's happiness and pains in daily life, especially in adolescence, by showing messages of affection with splendid sounds. Main characters in her lyrics came from her own experiences and deliberately she often wrote them from a man(boy)’s point of view (cross gender performance).

== History ==
In 2009, Hump Back was formed mainly by Momoko Hayashi as a high school club. At that time, it played songs of Chatmonchy. The reason why "Hump Back" was chosen as the name of the band leader, Momoko Hayashi, a cat lover, wanted to pick a word indirectly related to cats. By chance, she saw the word "humpback" and its meaning in Japanese (Nekoze: a back like cats). Hump Back uses a humpback whale logo for their merchandise.

In 2012, Hump Back took part in a rock music competition for teens, called Senko Riot, where the band advanced to the semi-final competition held in Osaka. In August 2012, the first EP say good bye from an indie label was released.

From 2013 to 2015, frequent member changes happened, and the band faced many difficulties. In April 2013, a member, Yukki, left. In June, Minami, who played as a supporting member, joined as a permanent member. But another member, Megu, left, and the following year Setsuko started to play as a supporting member. In January 2015, the last live event for Minami was held, and it also became the last stage for Setsuko. Hayashi alone remained and continued to play solo. In April, new EP Kaeri michi was released at only one CD shop in Osaka. Kanna (in April) and Pika (in May) joined and the band restarted. After Kanna left in November 2015, Misaki became a member in February 2016 and all the present members (Hayashi, Pika and Misaki) fixed. In August, Hump Back belonged to an indie label called Well Bucket Records and in December under the label it released EP Yoru ni nattara which was the first one on sale throughout Japan.

In November 2017, EP Hanamuke and EP Keshigomu kashite (Hayashi's solo performance on the acoustic guitar) were on sale.

From 2017, Hump Back went on a live tour throughout Japan every year.

In June 2018, from a major label VAP, Single Haikei shonen yo was released

In 2019, new Hump Back's label, called Hayashi Ongaku Kyōsitsu was established in VAP. and in July, CD Album Ningen nanosa(Best ranking was number 6 in Weekly Oricon) was on sale from the label. Hump Back released CD Album Achatter(Best ranking : number 7) in 2021. and EP Age of Love(Best ranking : number 12) in 2022

In May 2023, the group held a concert called "Our Wedding Ceremony (Uchiage Hiroen)" at Nippon Budokan, Tokyo, as each member had recently married. Momoko Hayashi married in October 2022, Misaki in November 2022 and Pika in July 2020. It was an opportunity to announce their marriage and to be celebrated by the fans. At the concert, they showed their preparedness for sustainable activities of their music for a life, though they have to spare the time for upcoming life events like childrearing, and their hope to communicate with fans through their music and live events, up until now and from now on.

In May, 2024, it was announced that all three members had given birth after they stopped live events in July 2023 due to their pregnancy.

In August 2026, the band announced that they were signing to Sony Music Entertainment Japan's Echoes, as well as their first release under the label, the EP Yawaraka na Dōkutsu, released on October 14.

== Members ==
=== Current members ===
- Momoko Hayashi (林 萌々子) – lead vocals, guitar (2009–present)
- Pika (ぴか) – bass, backing vocals (2015–present)
- Misaki (美咲) – drums, backing vocals (2016–present)

=== Former members ===
- Megu (めぐ) – bass, backing vocals (2009–2013)
- Yukkii (ゆっきー) – drums (2009–2013)
- 373 – drums (2013–2015)
- Setsuko (せつこ) – support bass (2014–2015)
- Kanna (カンナ) – drums, backing vocals (2015)

== Discography ==
=== Single CDs ===
	Released date	Title	Label	Best Ranking	Remarks
1	June 20, 2018	Haikei shonen yo	VAP	13	"Haikei shonen yo", "Night Theater", "Ikiteiku" and "Kujira" are on CD Album Ningen nanosa
2	December 5, 2018	Namida no yukue	VAP	13	"Haikei shonen yo", "Night Theater", "Ikiteiku" and "Kujira" are on CD Album Ningen nanosa
3	August 19, 2020	Teen age sunset	VAP / Hayashi Ongaku Kyōsitsu	12	"Senko" is on CD Album Achatter
4	June 21, 2023	tour/Linger	VAP / Hayashi Ongaku Kyōsitsu	14	"tour" was released as a PR song for AOYAMA Trading Co.(Japan's largest clothing retailer).

=== CD Albums ===
	Released date	Title	Songwriter	Arrangement	Label	Best Ranking
1	July 17, 2019	Ningen nanosa	Momoko Hayashi	Hump Back	VAP / Hayashi Ongaku Kyōsitsu	6
2	August 4, 2021	ACHATTER	Momoko Hayashi, Pika	Hump Back	VAP / Hayashi Ongaku Kyōsitsu	7
3	March 26, 2025	Hump Back	Momoko Hayashi, GIMA☆KENTA of "I Was Born"	Hump Back	VAP / Hayashi Ongaku Kyōsitsu	16

=== EPs ===
	Released date	Title	Songwriter	Arrangement	Label	Best Ranking
1	August 10, 2022	AGE OF LOVE	Momoko Hayashi, Pika	Hump Back	VAP / Hayashi Ongaku Kyōsitsu	12

	Released date	Title	Songwriter	Arrangement	Label	Best Ranking
1	December 7, 2016	Yoru ni nattara	Momoko Hayashi	Hump Back	Well Bucket	67
2	November 22, 2017	hanamuke	Momoko Hayashi	Hump Back	Well Bucket	17
3	October 14, 2026	Yawaraka na Dōkutsu			Echoes	

=== DVDs ===
	Released date	Title	Label	Best Ranking
1	March 24, 2021	At Osaka Castle Hall, Hump Back Concert Tour "Haikei Shonen Shojo Tachi Yo"	Vap / Hayashi Ongaku Kyōsitsu	10
2	March 30, 2022	Hump Back pre. "ACHATTER Tour" 2021.11.28 at NIPPON BUDOKAN	Vap / Hayashi Ongaku Kyōsitsu	9
3	November 22, 2023	Hump Back pre.“Uchiage Hiroen”LIVE at NIPPON BUDOKAN	Vap / Hayashi Ongaku Kyōsitsu	5 (in Music DVDs)

=== CDs from Indies' Label ===
Released date	Title	Songwriter	Remarks
Aug. 1, 2012	say good bye	Momoko Hayashi	
December 22, 2013	Aoi hitomi	Momoko Hayashi	
April 1, 2015	Kaeri michi	Momoko Hayashi	Sold only at a single CD shop
July 22, 2015	Junanasai	Momoko Hayashi	
