= If It's You, I Might Try Falling in Love =

Japanese manga series

- Cover of vol. 1 of the Japanese version

君となら恋をしてみても (Kimi to Nara Koi o Shite Mite mo)
- Genre: Boys' love, coming-of-age romance
- Manga
- Written by: Maru Kubota
- Published by: Hakusensha
- English publisher: NA: Yen Press
- Imprint: Hanamaru Comics
- Magazine: Manga Park
- Original run: April 30, 2021 – May 8, 2026
- Volumes: 8
- Television drama
- Directed by: Hana Matsumoto
- Written by: Mash Morino
- Licensed by: GagaOOLala
- Original network: MBS TV
- Original run: October 5, 2023 – November 2, 2023
- Episodes: 5
- icon

If It's You, I Might Try Falling in Love (Japanese: 君となら恋をしてみても, Hepburn: Kimi to Nara Koi o Shite Mite mo) is a Japanese manga series by Maru Kubota. It was serialized digitally on the manga mobile app Manga Park from April 30, 2021, to May 8, 2026.

A live-action television drama adaptation, released internationally under the English title If It's with You, was broadcast on MBS TV from October 6, 2023, to November 3, 2023. (Note: TV Kanagawa broadcast the episodes 1.5 hours earlier than MBS TV's scheduled time.)

== Plot ==
High school student Amane Kaidou is hesitant to fall in love after being teased for being gay. When he moves to Enoshima, he meets Ryuuji Yamasuge on his first day in town. Ryuuji is kind and accepting towards Amane, and the boys become fast friends. They soon find each other falling in love.

== Characters ==
Amane Kaidou (海堂 天, Kaidō Amane)
Voiced by: Kōhei Amasaki (voice drama), Portrayed by: Takato Ōkura (TV drama)
Amane is a sensitive high school student who faces a past trauma. He is drawn towards Ryuuji and falls in love with him.
Ryuuji Yamasuge (山菅 龍司, Yamasuge Ryūji)
Voiced by: Yuma Uchida (voice drama), Portrayed by: Wataru Hyūga (TV drama)
Ryuuji is a high school student who is kind and caring towards everyone. He helps out at his family's restaurant.

== Media ==
=== Manga ===
If It's You, I Might Try Falling in Love was written and illustrated by Maru Kubota. It was serialized digitally on the manga mobile app Manga Park from April 30, 2021, to May 8, 2026. The chapters were later released in eight bound volumes by Hakusensha under the Hanamaru Comics imprint.

On August 24, 2024, Yen Press announced at Anime NYC 2024 that they were licensing the series in English for North American distribution.

In 2022, Kubota stated through an interview with Chil Chil that the story was originally set around childhood friends where the seme was younger, but she changed the setting after she felt that she would be able to draw "lots of things" if the characters were not familiar with each other. She enjoyed drawing the food in the series despite its difficulties, and she stated that she wanted to try the food and get to know its taste before drawing it. She would also imagine the taste of food she could not eat. As the story took place in a real-life location, Kubota paid particular attention to the location so that the characters would seem as if they were actually living there.

No.	Original release date	Original ISBN	English release date	English ISBN
1	January 15, 2022 (digital); August 31, 2022 (physical)	9784592721116	March 25, 2025	9798855405019
2	November 30, 2022	9784592721147	August 26, 2025	9798855405033
3	April 5, 2023	9784592721192	March 24, 2026	9798855405057
4	August 4, 2023	9784592721253	January 26, 2027	9798855405071
5	June 5, 2024	9784592721413	TBA	—
6	September 5, 2025	9784592721710	TBA	—
7	May 1, 2026	9784592721840	TBA	—
8	August 5, 2026	9784592721895	TBA	—

=== Voice drama ===
An audio drama starring Yuma Uchida as Ryuuji and Kōhei Amasaki as Amane was released on Manga Park.

=== Television drama ===
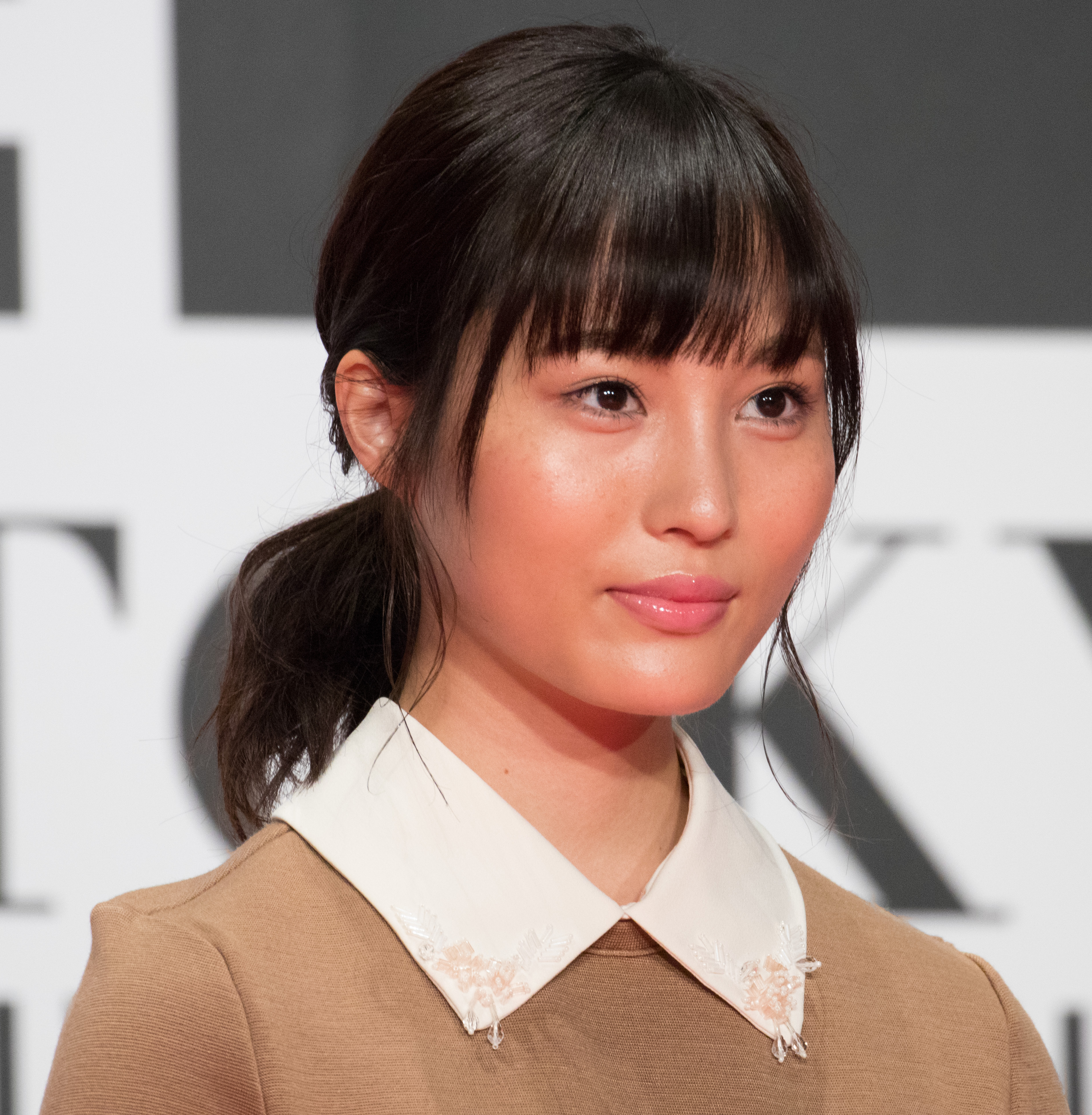
Hana Matsumoto (pictured in 2016) directed the live-action drama adaptation.

A live-action television drama adaptation of If It's You, I Might Try Falling in Love was announced on July 28, 2023, as the fifteenth entry to MBS TV's late-night Thursday television block, Drama Tokku. The series was broadcast from October 6, 2023, (Note: MBS lists the premiere date as October 5, 2023, at 25:04, which is October 6, 2023, at 1:04 a.m. Subsequent broadcasts are at 00:59, which is 12:59 a.m. on the next day.) to November 3, 2023, on MBS TV, for a total of 5 episodes. Other broadcasts include TV Kanagawa, Chiba TV, TV Saitama, Tochigi TV, and Gunma TV. TV Kanagawa broadcast the episodes from October 5 to November 2, 2023, 1.5 hours earlier than its scheduled time on MBS TV. The series is licensed by GagaOOLala for English-language distribution outside of Japan, South Korea, and Taiwan, who released it under the title If It's With You.

The series stars Takato Ōkura as Amane and Wataru Hyūga as Ryuuji. The television drama adaptation is directed by Hana Matsumoto and written by Mash Morino. The opening theme is "Kirameku Kimochi" by The Shes Gone. The ending theme is "Yoru Urusai" by Osage featuring Riko Ishino.

==== Episodes ====
No.	Title	Directed by	Written by	Original release date
1	"Episode 1"; Transliteration: "Dai-ichi-wa" (Japanese: 第1話)	Hana Matsumoto	Mash Morino	October 5, 2023
2	"Episode 2"; Transliteration: "Dai-ni-wa" (Japanese: 第2話)	Hana Matsumoto	Mash Morino	October 12, 2023
3	"Episode 3"; Transliteration: "Dai-san-wa" (Japanese: 第3話)	Hana Matsumoto	Mash Morino	October 19, 2023
4	"Episode 4"; Transliteration: "Dai-yon-wa" (Japanese: 第4話)	Hana Matsumoto	Mash Morino	October 26, 2023
5	"Episode 5"; Transliteration: "Dai-go-wa" (Japanese: 第5話)	Hana Matsumoto	Mash Morino	November 2, 2023

== Reception ==
In 2023, If It's You, I Might Try Falling in Love consecutively sold over 100,000 physical copies in Japan. The Television reviewed the live-action drama adaptation favorably, describing it as "refreshing" and "heart-fluttering".
