= Grow Up Show =

Japanese anime television series

- Grow Up Show: Sunflower Circus
- Key visual

グロウアップショウ ～ひまわりのサーカス団 (Gurō Appu Shō: Himawari no Sākasu-dan)
- Created by: Circus Collection Association
- Anime television series
- Directed by: Kanta Kamei
- Produced by: Manabu Jinguji; Mikio Miyara; Yutaka Kusuno; Koichiro Tomita; Tomoyuki Ohwada
- Written by: Takeshi Kikuchi
- Music by: Yugo Kanno
- Studio: A-1 Pictures; Psyde Kick Studio
- Licensed by: NA: Aniplex of America; SEA: Muse Communication
- Original network: Tokyo MX, GTV, GYT, BS11, TVA, MBS, AT-X
- Original run: July 5, 2026 – September 27, 2026
- Episodes: 13
- icon

Grow Up Show: Sunflower Circus (Note: Japanese: グロウアップショウ ～ひまわりのサーカス団～, Hepburn: Gurō Appu Shō: Himawari no Sākasu-dan; lit. 'Grow Up Show: The Sunflower Circus Troupe') is an original anime television series produced by A-1 Pictures and Psyde Kick Studio. It is directed by Kanta Kamei, featuring scriptwriting by Takeshi Kikuchi, original character designs by Kurehito Misaki, animation character designs by Kazutoshi Makino, and music by Yugo Kanno. The series aired from July 5 to September 27, 2026 on Tokyo MX and other networks. (Note: Tokyo MX listed the series premiere on July 4 at 24:00, which is effectively July 5 at midnight JST.) The opening theme song is "Yurari Yureru" (ユラリユレル), performed by Nomelon Nolemon, and the ending theme song is "Days!", performed by Aooo. Aniplex of America licensed the series for streaming on Crunchyroll. Muse Communication licensed the series in Southeast Asia.

== Plot ==
During the 1950s, Japan experienced a circus boom in response to its booming economy, with circuses around the country aiming to be part of the prestigious Circus Collection festival. The Sunflower Circus is one such circus, but has been suffering from financial issues. Things change when Mizuka Tsurumaki joins the Sunflower Circus, with her arrival bringing optimism to the circus and boosting their drive to make it to Circus Collection.

== Characters ==
=== Sunflower Circus ===
Mizuka Tsurumaki (鶴巻 瑞佳, Tsurumaki Mizuka)
Voiced by: Tomoka Noda (Japanese); Lizzie Freeman (English)
A circus prodigy who joins the Sunflower Circus. While cheerful and passionate about the circus, her abrasive personality has caused resentment towards her. It is later revealed that her father, who was the star of the Lotus Circus, transferred her into the Sunflower Circus for 39,800 yen and has not contacted her since, leaving her to fend for herself. She takes over as Sunflower Circus's ringmaster after Maria's hospitalization.
Ouka Kawasumi (川澄 桜翔, Kawasumi Ōka)
Voiced by: Shiori Kurosaki (Japanese); Cristina Vee (English)
The Sunflower Circus's star performer, who specializes in the flying trapeze. She becomes Mizuka's partner. Although she has a serious personality, she also has an airheaded side to her.
Imari Agano (吾野 伊万里, Agano Imari)
Voiced by: Reo Osanai (Japanese); Risa Mei (English)
A magician who has a friendly but clumsy demeanor. She is friends with Rin.
Isuzu Ikazuchi (五十土 五十鈴, Ikazuchi Isuzu)
Voiced by: Nanako Ando (Japanese); Jenny Yokobori (English)
A tomboyish acrobat with a strong sense of justice.
Aoi Yura (由良 葵, Yura Aoi)
Voiced by: Tomori Kusunoki (Japanese); Lisa Reimold (English)
Akane's twin sister and her partner in juggling, who has an observant and laid-back personality.
Akane Yura (由良 茜, Yura Akane)
Voiced by: Yūko Natsuyoshi (Japanese); Michelle Marie (English)
Aoi's twin sister and her partner in juggling. In contrast to Aoi, she has a rougher personality towards others, although she cares deeply about her sister.
Shizuku Sakawa (酒匂 雫, Sakawa Shizuku)
Voiced by: Yuna Kamakura (Japanese); Katiana Sarkissian (English)
A performer whose job is to catch trapeze performers. She is long-time friends with Svetlana.
Svetlana (スヴェトラーナ, Suvetorāna)
Voiced by: Yuka Iwahashi (Japanese); Sky Santacruz (English)
A performer who specializes in aerial silks. She is treated like an older sister by the other circus members. It is later revealed that her full name is Svetlana Rosen Yamada (スヴェトラーナ・ローゼン・山田, Suvetorāna Rōzen Yamada).
Rin Mamiya (間宮 凛, Mamiya Rin)
Voiced by: Ai Kayano (Japanese); Kira Buckland (English)
The circus's accountant, who also does other management-related work. She is bothered by the circus's constant financial issues.
Maria (麻利亜)
Voiced by: Rie Kugimiya (Japanese); Cassandra Lee Morris (English)
A clown and the ringmaster of the Sunflower Circus, who is often mistaken for being a child despite being an adult. It is later revealed that her family name is Sumeragi and she is the older sister of Nanami Sumeragi. As a child, an accident caused stunted physical development, which led to her acquaintance with the ringmaster of the Lotus Circus. Later on in the series, she is hospitalized after passing out, with her condition requiring treatment in the United States.
Francois (フランソワ, Furansowa)
Voiced by: Yuka Iwahashi
A young elephant abused by the Rafflesia Circus. Maria later adopted it, thus becoming a part of the Sunflower Circus.

=== Lotus Circus ===
Black Lotus (ブラックロータス, Burakku Rōtasu)
Voiced by: Yoshiyuki Yamaguchi
The former ringmaster of the Lotus Circus, and the father of Mizuka.
Aiden Jett Mitscher (エイデン・ジェット・ミッチャー, Eiden Jetto Mitchā)
Voiced by: Junichi Suwabe
A former member of the Lotus Circus, and the partner of Black Lotus.

=== Sumeragi Group ===
Nanami Sumeragi (皇 七海, Sumeragi Nanami)
Voiced by: Akira Sekine (Japanese); Allegra Clark (English)
The ringmaster of the Blue Rose Circus under the Sumeragi Group, and also works as a trapeze artist. It is later revealed that she is Maria's younger sister.
Mutsumi Kongouji (金剛寺 睦美, Kongōji Mutsumi)
Voiced by: Eri Suzuki (Japanese); Cat Protano (English)
The ringmaster of the Shiny Lavender Circus under the Sumeragi Group.

=== Others ===
Kasumi Shirahama (白濱 霞, Shirahama Kasumi)
Voiced by: Tsumugi Misono (Japanese); Christina Costello (English)
A student at Ouka's old boarding school.
Shino (信乃)
Voiced by: Mari Okamoto (Japanese); Allegra Clark (English)
An elderly woman who works at Ouka's old boarding school.
Rafflesia's Ringmaster (ラフレシア団長, Rafureshia Danchō)
Voiced by: Hitomi Nabatame
An abusive ringmaster of a struggling circus troupe. She was arrested on the grounds of animal cruelty and attempted swindling.

== Episodes ==
No.	Title	Directed by (Note: Production staff information is taken from the ending credits of each episode.)	Written by	Storyboarded by	Original release date
1	"Welcome to the Sunflower Circus!"; Transliteration: "Yōkoso, Himawari Sākasu e!" (Japanese: ようこそ、ひまわりサーカスへ！)	Satsuki Takahashi	Takeshi Kikuchi	Kanta Kamei	July 5, 2026
After a circus performance in late-1940s Japan, its leading performer approaches his daughter, determined to train her to be their next star. Around ten years later, this girl, now a teenager, collapses while travelling on foot and is later found and rescued by two members of the travelling Sunflower Circus. Initially not knowing who her rescuers are, the rescued girl attempts to excuse herself, but finds out, from the circus ringmaster Maria, that she has already reached her destination. Maria introduces their newest recruit, Mizuka Tsurumaki, as a prodigy who joined from the Lotus Circus, and asks Mizuka for feedback on their training. Mizuka gives a scathing review, provoking fury from some of the other members. After hearing that Ouka Kawasumi, one of their members, seemed to be holding back on the trapeze, Maria responds by challenging Mizuka to be that member's trapeze partner instead. During practice, when Ouka grabs hold of Mizuka's arms for the first time, she experiences a strange feeling. At the end of the day, before the Sunflower Circus set off for their next destination, Mizuka finds out that she had been sold into indentured servitude by the Lotus Circus, and still has 38,800 yen of debt to clear.
2	"That Was So Dazzling"; Transliteration: "Sore wa Tottemo, Mabushikute" (Japanese: それはとっても、眩しくて)	Kiichirō Murase	Takeshi Kikuchi	Kanta Kamei	July 12, 2026
It is revealed that Ouka was inspired to join a circus after watching the same late-1940s performance by the Lotus Circus. In the present setting, the Sunflower Circus arrive at Toyokawa, Aichi, but notice that the Shiny Lavender Circus owned by the Sumeragi Group had set up at the Sunflower Circus' intended location, after the Sunflower Circus failed to agree on a fee up front for hiring said location. Ouka steps in by making a call to her former boarding school around the area. They agree to host the Sunflower Circus visit and let their students see them perform. One of their students, Kasumi Shirahama, is an aspiring circus performer herself, and chases Mizuka around the school grounds after Mizuka tries to back out of performing. Mizuka ends up having to save Kasumi from a fall. After Maria insists on Mizuka showing her trapeze skills to the students, Mizuka initially chooses Kasumi as her partner, but during practice, Kasumi fails to reach Mizuka after several tries. Ouka takes over as Kasumi's practice partner - after bandaging Kasumi's hands, she reaches Kasumi after a single try at the trapeze, then gives Kasumi some advice. The following day, the Sunflower Circus put on one final practice round for the students. Kasumi, who was supposed to perform with them, backs out at the last minute, having told Ouka that she wants to see her perform with Mizuka. Mizuka and Ouka perform on the trapeze together, but after the performance, Mizuka again rules out a long-term partnership with either Ouka or Kasumi.
3	"I Don't Want to Show My Scars"; Transliteration: "Kizuato Nanka, Misetakunai" (Japanese: 傷跡なんか、見せたくない)	Yuki Watanabe	Takeshi Kikuchi	Kanta Kamei	July 19, 2026
It is revealed that Shizuku and Svetlana used to perform for the Shiny Lavender Circus, but after Shizuku broke her shoulder due to a training accident, she left along with Svetlana. In the present setting, Sunflower set up their tent before observing Shiny Lavender's - their ringmaster, Mitsumi Kongoji, recognizes Shizuku and deems her a "loser". Sunflower decide that their only chance of attracting a greater audience than Shiny Lavender is to make changes to their order of performances. Mizuka decides that Svetlana's aerial silk act will open the show. The following day, during her break from training, Ouka is approached by Nanami Sumeragi, the heir of the Sumeragi Group. Nanami takes a brief look at Ouka's training partners before deciding to leave. Nanami and Mitsumi then decide to watch Sunflower's first show in their new performance order, in which Shizuku and Ouka would perform last on the trapeze. Their performance is interrupted midway due to Shizuku's shoulder reaching its limit. After turning off the lights to dress Mizuka in her performing outfit, Sunflower resume the trapeze act with Mizuka in place of Shizuku. Nanami and Mitsumi make their final observations before leaving. At the end of their scheduled show dates, Sunflower catch the attention of the local press, while Mizuka struggles to get over the embarrassment of having to be forced into her outfit during the first show.
4	"I Just Can't Bring Myself to Be Honest"; Transliteration: "Sunao ni Nanka, Narenakute" (Japanese: 素直になんか、なれなくて)	Kazuki Kawagishi	Takeshi Kikuchi	Kanta Kamei	July 26, 2026
It is revealed that the money earned by the Sunflower Circus during their previous dates was seized by creditors, leaving the travelling circus broke again. After their vehicle runs out of gas near the beach, Maria decides to sign her troupe to part-time work at said beach. They turn out to be incompetent at their duties and are dismissed not long after being hired. While still at the beach, Mizuka and Imari notice a boy crying for his mother. Imari cheers him up with a magic trick, giving Mizuka an idea. However, Imari is overwhelmed by the idea of performing in front of an audience, and panics. She further explains that her father, who was a famous magician, had botched a performance and lost both his reputation and his family, after which Maria took Imari under her wing and supported her throughout all her shows. Imari also regrets turning down Isuzu, her childhood friend who wanted to go with her at the time, leading her to think that Isuzu, who has since joined Sunflower, hates her now. Nevertheless, Mizuka sets up a part of the beach for Imari to perform, and an audience gathers before Imari. Just then, Ouka runs towards Mizuka and berates her for skipping practice, only for Mizuka to improvise Imari's magic show by trapping Ouka with herself in a treasure chest. Imari remains overwhelmed by the audience that had gathered, only for Isuzu to call out to her with words of encouragement. Imari successfully pulls off her show of magic, which, inconveniently for Mizuka, leads into another show she has to do alongside Ouka. At the end of the day, the Sunflower Circus is dragged even further into debt due to the police reporting their activities at the beach as unauthorized solicitation, along with the use of explosives. Maria simply passes the debt down to Mizuka.
5	"There Is Nowhere I Belong"; Transliteration: "Ibasho Nanka, Doko ni mo Nai" (Japanese: 居場所なんか、どこにもない)	Isamu Yamaguchi	Takeshi Kikuchi	Kanta Kamei	August 2, 2026
Maria offers Mizuka a chance to pay off her debt by letting her coach other members of the Sunflower Circus. Aoi becomes the first to receive instruction from Mizuka; seeing this, Akane becomes jealous and refuses Mizuka's offer to tutor her as well. Aoi later explains to Akane her reasons for accepting Mizuka's coaching, but Akane takes this as a firm rejection and runs away into the forest. Meanwhile, in an attempt to get away from Ouka, Mizuka eavesdrops on a nearby circus that features animals and overhears the ringmaster mentioning that their baby elephant, Francois, may have escaped into the forest; the ringmaster plans to offer a reward to locals who help find it. Eyeing the reward money, Mizuka goes into the forest to search for the elephant. However, it is Akane who unexpectedly encounters Francois in a cave and notices the wounds on the elephant's body. Mizuka soon finds them as well. Akane refuses Mizuka's suggestion to return the elephant, while Mizuka discovers that Akane possesses the ability to communicate with animals. Mizuka, Akane and Francois stay in the cave overnight, subsisting on apples that Mizuka stole from the other circus using magic. Mizuka then informs Akane that Aoi has seen other members of Sunflower improve, and wants to do the same in order to stay with Akane. In turn, Mizuka also coaches Akane. The next morning, Francois alerts Akane to visitors from outside the cave who have found them, including the ringmaster of the elephant's circus, accompanied by a group of local hunters. The rest of Sunflower arrive at the scene, exposing the ringmaster's plan to stage the elephant's escape before putting it down in order to claim insurance. They also provide evidence of Francois being abused, and declare that they will take the elephant in under their care. Aoi and Akane share a tearful reunion before the ringmaster of the other circus is arrested and taken into police custody.
6	"A Sinister Legend Summons a Storm"; Transliteration: "Imawashiki Densetsu, Arashi o Yonde" (Japanese: 忌まわしき伝説、嵐を呼んで)	Minami Honma	Takeshi Kikuchi	Kanta Kamei	August 9, 2026
The upkeep for taking care of an elephant has stretched the Sunflower Circus's budget further. During a casual conversation, they talk about the Lotus Circus's former glory and the current rise of the Sumeragi Group. Ouka expresses her admiration for Lotus, and Mizuka inadvertently reveals that she was the daughter of Lotus's ringmaster, shocking the younger members. That evening, Maria mentions to Rin, Shizuku and Svetlana that she was indeed entrusted by Mizuka's father to help take care of Mizuka. Before bedtime, Ouka finds out that the book Mizuka had on her when she was found, was a picture book of The Wonderful Wizard of Oz. The next morning, Sunflower are visited by Lotus member Aiden Jett Mitscher, who is on vacation. Mitscher lets everyone experience Mizuka's "terrifying" training. Ouka asks to try performing a trapeze act with Mitscher, after which Mitscher praises Ouka's performance and physique. After calling out to Mizuka who was hiding, Mitscher watches Shizuku and Svetlana's aerial silk double-act and asks Mizuka for feedback. Not impressed with Mizuka's answer, Mitscher whispers something to Shizuku. She and Svetlana perform again, and more impressively than before. Mitscher also reveals that Svetlana is Svetlana Rosen Yamada, who, aged ten, was the star of a top Soviet circus. Seeing the potential of Sunflower, Mitscher encourages Mizuka to focus on performing with Sunflower, as he deems her an inadequate coach. He would also help Sunflower pay off their debt in instalments. Mizuka sees this as a challenge, to which Mitscher merely says he'll show her "what a real circus is".
7	"I Don't Get the Circus"; Transliteration: "Sākasu ga, Wakaranai" (Japanese: サーカスが、わからない)	Aya Mikami	Takeshi Kikuchi	Kanta Kamei	August 16, 2026
According to Mitscher, Mizuka spent most of her childhood travelling with the Lotus Circus and training under them. However, the ringmaster Black Lotus soon failed to deliver good performances, causing him to disband the circus and take away his daughter Mizuka's dream of performing with them. Hearing this, the Sunflower Circus's performers realize why Mizuka doesn't want to perform with them. Rin then informs Sunflower that Sumeragi Group's Blue Rose Circus, their best-performing troupe, had decided to set up near their next venue. Mizuka is late to the news having decided to challenge Mitscher, who still thinks that Mizuka performing for Sunflower won't save them. He puts Mizuka's trapeze skills to the test against his own, and offers to pay off Sunflower's debt if Mizuka is judged to perform better with Ouka than himself. The following day, Mitscher decides to have Shizuku and Svetlana perform against Mizuka and Ouka on the trapeze instead, since Svetlana did have experience on the trapeze herself. Svetlana, on her first trapeze performance for Sunflower, impresses the watching Imari, Isuzu, Akane and Aoi, all of whom also call her Yamada for the first time. Mizuka then runs away after being reminded of her "weird smile". Mitscher then requests to talk to Ouka alone. He admits that the Lotus Circus failed to teach Mizuka the "common sense" expected from a professional performer, and asks Ouka to be the one who teaches Mizuka instead. Meanwhile, Nanami Sumeragi, still bitter about losing Ouka Kawasumi to the Sunflower Circus, reminds Mitsumi Kongoji of the reason why she was transferred to the Blue Rose Circus. The next day, Mitscher has one final conversation with Maria before leaving. On their way to their venue, the rest of Sunflower persuade Mizuka to not quit after their next show.
8	"This Is What I Always Wanted"; Transliteration: "Sore wa Zutto, Hoshikatta Mono" (Japanese: それはずっと、ほしかったもの)	Yuki Watanabe	Ōgyo Kawagishi	Kanta Kamei	August 23, 2026
Despite the expected low turnout, the Sunflower Circus proceed with their show, which includes Francois' debut for them. Mizuka, scheduled last to perform alongside Ouka, is given words of encouragement from Shizuku, Svetlana and Ouka herself. After catching Ouka the first time, Mizuka remembers her father's words, and finally makes a genuine smile when she catches Ouka the second time. After witnessing the standing ovation given to Mizuka and Ouka, Nanami finally realizes why Ouka turned down the Sumeragi Group's advances. Mizuka also admits to the rest of Sunflower for the first time, that circuses are fun. The following day, Sunflower note a higher-than-expected crowd for their upcoming weekend dates. Later that same day, Mizuka and Ouka are invited to watch the Blue Rose Circus perform nearby. Blue Rose treat a sellout crowd to the performances of their unicyclists, jugglers and aerial silk artists, before concluding with a trapeze act of their own. To Mizuka and Ouka's shock, the trapeze artists performing for Blue Rose are Nanami Sumeragi and Aiden Jett Mitscher. Mizuka witnesses Nanami land the Lotus Blossom move that her father used to perform. After the show, Mizuka and Ouka retreat to a nearby river to discuss what they had just seen. Ouka decides that, instead of attempting to learn the Lotus Blossom herself, she and Mizuka would create their own unique act. Mizuka flusters herself while attempting to agree with Ouka. After four more shows, Sunflower finally turn a profit and can enjoy a decent after-show meal. They also let Mizuka proclaim the final toast, before announcing that their shows had also cleared the debt Mizuka owed to them, and that she is free to leave. Upon Ouka's prompt, Mizuka asks to stay with Sunflower for a little longer. They agree to Mizuka's request, and also remind her to inform Maria. Mizuka does eventually find Maria passed out at the foot of a flight of stairs.
9	"Is All That Kindness Just a Lie?"; Transliteration: "Sono Yasashisa wa, Zenbu Uso?" (Japanese: その優しさは、ぜんぶ嘘？)	Kiichirō Murase	Ōgyo Kawagishi	Kanta Kamei	August 30, 2026
The circus members visit Maria in the hospital. Mizuka and Ouka notice Rin's connection to Nanami. When they try to tell Maria, she reveals she knows about it and recounts her past: 20 years ago, she was injured abroad (pituitary gland damage leading to developmental delays), suffered amnesia, and was separated from her family. She was taken in by the Lotus Circus and admired them. Five years later, she regained her memory and left, and four years after that, she founded her own circus by which time the Lotus Circus had disbanded. She reveals she is Nanami's older sister and knows Rin is negotiating to sell Sunflower Circus to Nanami to raise money for her medical treatment. Later, when Nanami and Maria are about to sign the transfer agreement, Mizuka, along with the others, threatens to withdraw all members from the circus to stop the deal. She also announces that they will participate in the Circus Collection festival through a special invitation—using her status as the daughter of the legendary Lotus Circus ringmaster and the recommendation of former member Mitscher—to win a prize. Maria is moved and decides to terminate the deal, then hands over her position as ringmaster to Mizuka, allowing her to lead the circus.
10	"Beyond the Stage of Dreams"; Transliteration: "Yume no Butai, Sono Mukōgawa e" (Japanese: 夢の舞台、その向こう側へ)	Kazuki Kawagishi	Ōgyo Kawagishi	Kanta Kamei	September 6, 2026
Nanami is disheartened that Mizuka qualified for the Circus Collection Festival through her status. Meanwhile, the members of Sunflower Circus dressed up Mizuka to the festival's draw. At the draw, Mizuka and Nanami talk, with Mizuka wishing everyone the best, but Nanami is angry. After the draw, the Sunflower Circus members discuss how people only focus on Mizuka's status and not Sunflower Circus. Meanwhile, Mutsumi and Nanami talk, with Nanami still angry about Sunflower Circus's insistence on "giving it their all" and "family" concepts and about her sister's refusal to return, Nanami vows to defeat Sunflower Circus. Mizuka and Ouka practice hard on their new trapeze move for the upcoming competition, with Mizuka saying she enjoys the atmosphere. The Sunflower Circus members visit Maria in the hospital to update her. On their way out, they encounter Nanami, who expresses strong disdain for them, but Mizuka says they'll only know the difference through competition. On their way to the competition venue, Mizuka encouraged everyone. During a conversation with Ouka, Ouka asked how Mizuka's father achieved those spectacular performances, and Mizuka recalled, "Performance isn't about how to execute difficult moves, but about how to make simple moves look superb." The members of Sunflower Circus trained diligently and ultimately defeated a traditionally strong circus troupe in the first qualifying round with their dazzling and captivating performance.
11	"For Whose Sake Is This Unfulfilled Dream?"; Transliteration: "Mihatenu Yume wa, Ta ga Tame ni?" (Japanese: 見果てぬ夢は、誰がために？)	Isamu Yamaguchi	Takeshi Kikuchi	Kanta Kamei	September 13, 2026
The Sunflower Circus advanced to the finals with an outstanding performance and will face the Blue Rose Circus. Mizuka and Ouka have been struggling to master a new trapeze maneuver, making little progress; meanwhile, Mizuka is also grappling with how to choreograph their routine for the final. Concerned that the pair are overexerting themselves, Shizuku and Svetlana insist they take a break and go out to avoid physical injury. Mizuka and Ouka spend the day exploring Yokohama, which helps them relax. Elsewhere, Imari, Isuzu, Aoi, and Akane take a break to mingle with the local crowd. At a café, Ouka opens up to Mizuka about her past: she had dreamed of joining the circus after seeing the Lotus Circus' performance, but no troupe would accept an outsider—except for Maria. Ouka views the Sunflower Circus as a true home. During their outing, the two come up with fresh ideas for their competition routine. Later, Rin informs the member that a doctor capable of treating Maria has been found in the United States, though the trip requires leaving on the very day of the finals.
12	"Where the Heart Resides – Weaving Dreams"; Transliteration: "Omoi no Arika, Tsumugu wa Yume" (Japanese: 想いの在処、紡ぐは夢)	Aya Mikami	Takeshi Kikuchi	Kanta Kamei	September 20, 2026
Mizuka, Isuzu, and Akane wanted to visit Maria before the finals but were stopped; Rin then relayed a message from Maria telling everyone not to worry and to focus on preparing for the competition. Nanami met with Ouka to confirm that both sides would give it their all and to remind her that Sunflower Circus would be disbanded if they lost. Determined to fulfill Maria's dream, Mizuka rallied the team for a final push before the finals. While bathing together, Mizuka showed Ouka the lineup of new acts planned for the final performance. During the finals, Sunflower Circus adopted a groundbreaking format: they wove circus acts into the narrative of The Wonderful Wizard of Oz and even invited the audience to participate in the performances. This approach was a spectacular success, creating an electric atmosphere at the Sunflower Circus venue—a scene that left Nanami and Mutsumi, over at the Blue Rose Circus venue, feeling both shocked and envious. Both Mizuka and Nanami happened to spot Rin bringing Maria—who was so ill she required a wheelchair—to watch the show; Nanami rushed over to ask why Maria had come, and Maria explained that she needed to verify something in person.
13	"Even Higher"; Transliteration: "Motto Takaku" (Japanese: もっと高く)	Isamu Yamaguchi, Aya Mikami, Kanta Kamei, and Satsuki Takahashi	Takeshi Kikuchi	Kanta Kamei	September 27, 2026
12 years ago, the sisters Maria and Nanami made a pact to bring dreams to people through the circus; however, Maria eventually left the profit-driven Sumeragi Group—feeling it could not accommodate her dream—to found the Sunflower Circus. In the present day, the sisters reunite, Nanami asks why Maria chose the Sunflower Circus to realize her dream instead of staying with her. Maria simply states that her dream has already come true through the Sunflower Circus's innovative performance style; she urges Nanami not to be overly fixated on her own circus but to focus on being true to herself, reassuring her that their sisterly bond remains unchanged. During the grand finale—the flying trapeze act—Nanami executes a move even more spectacular than what was performed at the Lotus Circus in the past, while Mizuka and Ouka conclude the show by swapping roles as flyer and catcher mid-act to heighten the difficulty. Although the Blue Rose Circus wins the final competition, Nanami decides against acquiring the Sunflower Circus. Maria eventually leaves for the United States to undergo medical treatment; although her departure is delayed beyond the original schedule, Nanami reveals that someone had persuaded the American doctor to wait for her arrival. Later, Maria writes to say she has completed her treatment and married her first love, Black Lotus—who had arranged for her care. Meanwhile, the Blue Rose Circus continues to compete on the global stage, and the Sunflower Circus carries on, operating with its unique "storytelling-meets-circus" performance style.

== Reception ==
=== Critical response ===
Caitlin Moore of Anime News Network described the series as "pretty good, but forgettable", noting that while the non-circus visuals are "bright, colorful, and pleasing to the eye" and the adult performers Svetlana and Shizuku are "at least somewhat believable as human beings with multiple dimensions," the show suffers heavily from an abbreviated 13-episode run that leaves most of the cast "largely forgettable" and fails to make either its 1950s setting or its circus performances "come alive." She also stated that although there are "flashes of brilliance around the trapeze animation", the narrative rushes through major second-half plot twists without giving the ensemble "some time to breathe", concluding that the series needed "at least twice as many episodes to reach its full potential."

== Other media ==
A manga anthology was released by Media Factory on August 21, 2026.

== See also ==
- Saekano, a light novel series illustrated by Kurehito Misaki
- Playful Relationships, another light novel series illustrated by Kurehito Misaki
