= Nomelon Nolemon =

Japanese music duo

- Origin: Japan
- Genre: J-pop
- Years active: 2021–present
- Labels: Sony Japan; Echoes
- Members: Tsumiki; Mikimaria
- Website: sonymusic.co.jp/PR/NOMELONNOLEMON

Nomelon Nolemon (stylized in all caps) is a Japanese musical duo, consisting of vocalist Mikimaria and composer Tsumiki. Tsumiki began his musical career as a Vocaloid producer in 2017 before forming the duo with Mikimaria in 2021. The duo released their debut single "Inazma" in August that year. Their first album Pop was released in January 2022. Their music has been featured in anime series such as Rurouni Kenshin: Kyoto Disturbance, Mobile Suit Gundam GQuuuuuuX, and Grow Up Show.

== History ==
Tsumiki began his musical career as a Vocaloid music producer in 2017, gaining popularity on Niconico. He has been interested in music since his childhood when he learned to play the keyboard and guitar. Mikimaria has been a member of the music collective Plusonica since December 2019 and released the mini-album Parfait on August 13, 2021. Although Tsumiki had been producing Vocaloid songs for years, he wanted to take his career in a new direction. After encountering Mikimaria's singing online, he contacted her and offered to work together.

The duo debuted on August 11, 2021, coinciding with Tsumiki's birthday, with its first song "Inazma", released on digital platforms two days later on August 13. The duo's name was not intended to have an actual meaning, although it was inspired by Tsumiki's liking for palindromes; in an interview with The Beat, Mikimaria admitted that Tsumiki does not eat melons. The duo was originally intended to feature different artists as opposed to just Mikimaria, but following their work on Inazma, he decided to have her be the duo's permanent vocalist.

The duo released their debut studio album, Pop, on January 26, 2022; one of its songs, "Syrup", was released ahead the album on January 12. They held their first solo live concerts, titled Shutter Chance, on September 4 and 9 of that year. Their song "Touch" was used as an insert song in the 2022 film The Violence Action.

The duo released its first anime song in 2024, "Suikōsetten" (水光接天), used as the first ending theme for Rurouni Kenshin: Kyoto Disturbance. In 2025, their song "Midnight Reflection" (ミッドナイト・リフレクション, Middonaito Rifurekushon) was used as an insert song in the anime television series Mobile Suit Gundam GQuuuuuuX. They made their first overseas appearance at Anime Expo in July 2025. In 2026, their song "Yurari Yureru" (ユラリユレル) was used as the opening theme to the anime television series Grow Up Show.

== Members ==
- Tsumiki (ツミキ) – songwriting, drums, guitar, keyboard
- Mikimaria (みきまりあ) – vocals, guitar

== Discography ==
=== Studio albums ===
List of studio albums, showing selected details and chart positions
Title	Details	Peaks	
Title	Details	JPN	JPN Hot
Pop	Released: January 26, 2022; Label: Sony Japan; Formats: CD, DL, streaming	—	51
Rule	Released: August 11, 2023; Label: Sony Japan; Formats: CD, DL, streaming	—	—
Eye	Released: February 11, 2026; Label: Echoes, Sony Japan; Formats: CD, CD+Blu-ray, DL, streaming	35	—
"—" denotes releases that did not chart or were not released in that region.

=== Extended plays ===
List of extended plays, showing selected details and chart positions
Title	Details	Peaks	
Title	Details	JPN	JPN Hot
Sensuous	Released: September 14, 2022; Label: Sony Japan; Formats: CD, DL, streaming	—	85
Halo – EP	Released: July 2, 2025; Label: Echoes, Sony Japan; Formats: CD, DL, streaming	19	—
"—" denotes releases that did not chart or were not released in that region.

== Singles ==
List of singles, showing year released, selected chart positions, and album name
Title	Year	Peak chart positions		Album
Title	Year	JPN	JPN Heat.	Album
"Inazma"	2021	—	—	Pop
"Yellow"	2021	—	—	Pop
"Touch"	2022	—	—	Sensuous
"Transparent Wednesday"	2022	—	—	Rule
"Dada"	2023	—	—	Rule
"Bad Love"	2023	—	—	Rule
"Hide and Seek"	2023	—	—	Rule
"Crazy!"	2024	—	—	Eye
"Suikōsetten"	2024	—	—	Eye
"Midnight Reflection"	2025	—	10	Halo – EP and Eye
"Afterimage"	2025	—	—	Halo – EP and Eye
"Halo"	2025	—	—	Halo – EP and Eye
"Seaglass"	2025	—	—	Eye
"Yurariyureru"	2026	22	—	Non-album single
"—" denotes releases that did not chart or were not released in that region.
