= Echoes (record label) =

Japanese record label and talent agency

- Parent company: Sony Music Labels
- Founded: September 12, 2024; 2 years ago
- Founder: Taichi Hirose; Shuya Yamamoto; Yohei Yashiro; Mitsuki Hirabayashi
- Distributors: Sony Music Solutions; The Orchard
- Genre: Various
- Country of origin: Japan
- Location: Chiyoda, Tokyo
- Official website: echoes-label.com

Echoes is a Japanese record label and talent agency owned by Sony Music Labels, a subsidiary of Sony Music Entertainment Japan. Founded on September 12, 2024, the label is self-described as "a label that resonates with the expression of music and art". Its notable artists include Yoasobi (Ayase and Lilas Ikuta), Maisondes, Aooo, Asmi, Tatsuya Kitani, Uketsu, Hump Back, Eve, and Hoshimachi Suisei, among others.

== History ==
On September 12, 2024, Sony Music Entertainment Japan announced a launch of Echoes, alongside revealing the first three signees—duo Yoasobi, musical project Maisondes, and rock band Aooo, as well as handling music platform Mecre. The label combines the activities of record label and talent agency, unlike most Japanese music companies. It aims to "focus on discovering artists who resonate with them, further increasing the diversity of the label and releasing works by new talents" to "reverberate, respond, and grow beyond all boundaries."

Echoes was founded by Taichi Hirose, Shuya Yamamoto, Yohei Yashiro, and Mitsuki Hirabayashi, SMEJ staffs who works with Yoasobi, Maisondes, Asmi, and Tatsuya Kitani, the latter two joined the label later. Non-musical acts, such as illustrator and animator Ai Nina, character Puppet Sunsun, and writer and YouTuber Uketsu was also signed to the label. Yashiro served as representative of Echoes until March 31, 2025, when SMEJ transferred him to Music Ray'n, and appointed Manabu Tsujino, a CEO of SMEJ's A&M Business Group, to be a representative of the label since April 1.

In March 2025, Echoes partnered with manga magazine Weekly Shōnen Sunday to form Nichimezo, a sub-unit of Maisondes, to contribute songs based on manga published on Weekly Shōnen Sunday and webcomic platform Sunday Webry. Since 2025, Echoes has organized Echoes Baa, a stage at the Central Music & Entertainment Festival, held annually at the Yokohama Red Brick Warehouse. The line-up features both the label's roster and outside acts. In October 2026, the label and Viral Pocket, a vertical video production of Nippon Television, jointly produced Spotted:, a content series of impromptu performance in public place.

In addition to its roster, Echoes distributes selected records from outside artists, especially anime song, such as Orangestar's "Petals" / "Flower Raft" for Agents of the Four Seasons: Dance of Spring (2026), Sweet Steady's "Kowa Kawaii" for Let's Go Kaikigumi (2026), and TeddyLoid's "Beyond the Night" (featuring Ayane Sakura and Nagi Inoue) for Expelled from Paradise: Resonance from the Heart (2026). The label handled the release and promotion of Haruomi Hosono's 23rd studio album Yours Sincerely (2026) exclusively in Japan, while elsewhere by Ghostly International.

== Artists ==
- Yoasobi
  - Ayase
  - Lilas Ikuta
- Maisondes
  - Nichimezo
- Aooo
- Ai Nina
- Nomelon Nolemon
- Asmi
- Puppet Sunsun
- Tatsuya Kitani
- Kano
- Draw Me
- Uketsu
- Yutori-kun
- Layra
- Hump Back
- Eve
- Misekai
- Hoshimachi Suisei

== Works ==
=== Discography ===
- Aooo – Aooo (2024)
- Aooo – Fooocus (2025)
- Nomelon Nolemon – Halo – EP (2025)
- Lilas Ikuta – Laugh (2025)
- Nomelon Nolemon – Eye (2026)
- Kano – Love Scam (2026)
- Yoasobi – E-Side 4 (2026)
- Ayase – Dialogue (2026)
- Aooo – Rooom (2026)
- Yoasobi – The Book For, (2026)
- Jack-Pot – Drive the Jack-Pot (2026)
- Haruomi Hosono – Yours Sincerely (2026)
- Hump Back – Yawaraka na Dōkutsu (2026)
- Tatsuya Kitani – Dekai (2026)
- Tatsuya Kitani – Pure (2026)
- Yoasobi – Yoasobi 5th Anniversary Dome Live 2024 "Chō-genjitsu" at Tokyo Dome (2026)
- Eve – Aiyou (2026)
- Hump Back – Hump Back 2016–2026 (2026)

=== Videography ===
- Yoasobi – The Film 3 (video album; 2025)
- Nina Ai – Luca (animated short film; 2026)
- Aooo – Aooo Live Tour "Ringring" at Zepp Haneda (Tokyo) (video album; 2026)

== Events ==
- Echoes Baa (2025–2026; part of the Central Music & Entertainment Festival)
- Echoes Weekend Seoul (2026; Aooo, Nomelon Nolemon, and Asmi)
