= Riko Ishino =

Japanese singer (born 2000)

- Born: 29 October 2000 (age 25)
- Origin: Hiroshima Prefecture, Japan
- Genre: J-pop
- Occupations: Singer; actress
- Instrument: Vocals
- Years active: 2014–present
- Member of: Aooo
- Formerly of: Idol Renaissance; Akai Ko-en

Riko Ishino (石野 理子, Ishino Riko; born 29 October 2000) is a Japanese singer from Hiroshima Prefecture, affiliated with SML Management. She has served as a former member of Idol Renaissance, as well as vocalist for Akai Ko-en and Aooo.

== Biography ==
Riko Ishino, a native of Hiroshima Prefecture, was born on 29 October 2000. She was educated at Actor's School Hiroshima and was part of their 20th graduating class. She graduated from Rikkyo University in 2023.

Ishino was part of Idol Renaissance from its formation in 2014 until its disbandment in February 2018. During her time with the group, she would commute from her native Hiroshima to Tokyo every weekend. In 2016, she starred in Yūsuke Koroyasu's movie First Album. A fan of the Hiroshima Toyo Carp baseball team, she sang the national anthem at the team's 22 September 2016 game at the Mazda Stadium. In 2017, she performed "Sanche Taisō", the theme song for Sanfrecce Hiroshima's mascot character Sanche.

On 4 May 2018, it was revealed at Viva La Rock 2018 that Ishino became part of Akai Ko-en as their new vocalist, replacing Chiaki Satō. Yūsuke Koide, as he confirmed on the 8 May 2018 episode of After 6 Junction, had recommended Ishino to Akai Ko-en leader Maisa Tsuno for consideration for the job. Akihiro Watanabe of Real Sound called the change an unprecedented one, citing her vocal talents, her "status as a Hello! Project fan and ability to view the idol scene objectively", and Koide's involvement. The band disbanded on 28 May 2021 due to Tsuno's death. In August 2023, she formed the band Aooo as the vocalist.

Ishino was vocalist for Misty Tone's songs "Hitohira" and "Nukumori", the theme song and insert song (respectively) for the 2023 TBS drama Brother Trap, as well as for Osage's song "Yoruwazurai", the ending theme of the 2023 MBS TV drama If It's with You. On 15 November 2023, Ishino released her first solo song, "Bricolage", which she wrote herself as a collaboration with composer A.G.O. and, according to Music Natalie, "explore[s] the meaning of her continued solo singing and her thoughts on her path to success". She was part of Studio April, formed for the 2025 Spring FM802 Access! Campaign to perform its campaign song "Sekiharuka".

== Discography ==
=== Singles ===
Title	Year	Details	Peak chart positions		Sales	Ref.
Title	Year	Details	JPN	JPN Comb.	Sales	Ref.
"Bricolage"	2023	Released: 15 November 2023; Format: Digital	—	—	—	

=== Other songs ===
Title	Year	Ref
"Hitohira" (ひとひら) (Misty Tone; as vocalist)	2023	
"Nukumori" (ぬくもり) (Misty Tone; as vocalist)	2023	
"Yoruwazurai" (夜煩い) (Osage; as vocalist)	2023	
"Sekiharuka" (赤春花) (Studio April; as vocalist)	2025	

== Filmography ==
=== Film ===
Year	Title	Role	Ref.
2016	First Album		
