= Usseewa =

2020 single by Ado

Single by Ado

from the album Kyōgen
- Language: Japanese
- Released: October 23, 2020
- Genre: Punk rock; electronic rock
- Length: 3:24
- Label: Virgin
- Songwriter: Syudou
- Producer: Syudou

Ado singles chronology
"Usseewa" (2020)	"Readymade" (2020)

Music video
- "Usseewa" on YouTube

"Usseewa" (Japanese: うっせぇわ) is a song by Japanese singer Ado, released as her debut single; it is the eleventh track on her debut album, Kyōgen (2022). It was released on October 23, 2020, as a digital single through Virgin Music. The song became popular among the younger generations in Japan, and has been called the "2021 youth anthem".

== Release ==
The original track was uploaded to YouTube on October 23, 2020, with an accompanying music video produced by Wooma. On December 2, 2020, a piano version of the song was released to commemorate the YouTube video of "Usseewa" surpassing 10 million views. A remix of the song by Giga was released on February 5, 2021.

== Composition and lyrics ==
"Usseewa" is Ado's first original song. The music was produced by Vocaloid producer Syudou, of whom Ado is a fan. Syudou also made a cover of this song and uploaded it to Youtube on January 4, 2021.

The term "Usseewa", roughly equivalent to "Shut up" in English, has been the topic of much debate. In particular, many parents in Japan have been worried about the effects of the song's lyrical content on young children. This subject was brought up on Fuji TV's High Noon TV Viking! MORE, as many children had started singing, or mimicking the song's lyrics in their speech. This has resulted in some nursery schools and kindergartens banning the song. Mitz Mangrove, on the other hand, argues that children may sing the song only because it is catchy, without understand the meaning of the words. She further stated that not hearing the song was almost impossible for children, as it had become a major hit played widely on TV and in shopping facilities.

Ado has expressed that the lyrics of the song are meant to help relieve the stress of her audience by resonating with their frustrations. She further states that she "sing[s] people's anger in their place, because [she] want[s] them to live positively."

== Commercial performance ==
The song peaked at number 1 on Billboard Japan Hot 100, Oricon Digital Singles Chart, Oricon Streaming Chart, and Spotify Viral 50 Japan. The music video of the song on YouTube reached 100 million views in 148 days after its release. It also reached 100 million plays on Billboard Japan after 17 weeks from charting-in, which was the sixth fastest in history and the youngest for a solo singer. The song became a social phenomenon dominating Japanese music streaming sites and karaoke charts months after its release.

== Charts ==
=== Weekly charts ===
Weekly chart performance for "Usseewa"
Chart (2021)	Peak position
Global 200 (Billboard)	41
Japan (Japan Hot 100)	1
Japan Combined Singles (Oricon)	2

=== Year-end charts ===
Year-end chart performance for "Usseewa"
Chart (2021)	Position
Global Excl. US (Billboard)	118
Japan (Japan Hot 100)	7
Japan Combined Singles (Oricon)	8
Chart (2022)	Position
Japan (Japan Hot 100)	59

=== All-time charts ===
All-time chart performance for "Usseewa"
Chart (2008–2022)	Position
Japan (Japan Hot 100)	23

== Certifications ==
Certifications for "Usseewa"
Region	Certification	Certified units/sales
Japan (RIAJ)	Platinum	250,000^{*}
Streaming
Japan (RIAJ)	3× Platinum	300,000,000^{†}
^{*} Sales figures based on certification alone.^{†} Streaming-only figures based on certification alone.
