= K-Arena Yokohama =

Indoor arena in Japan

- K-Arena
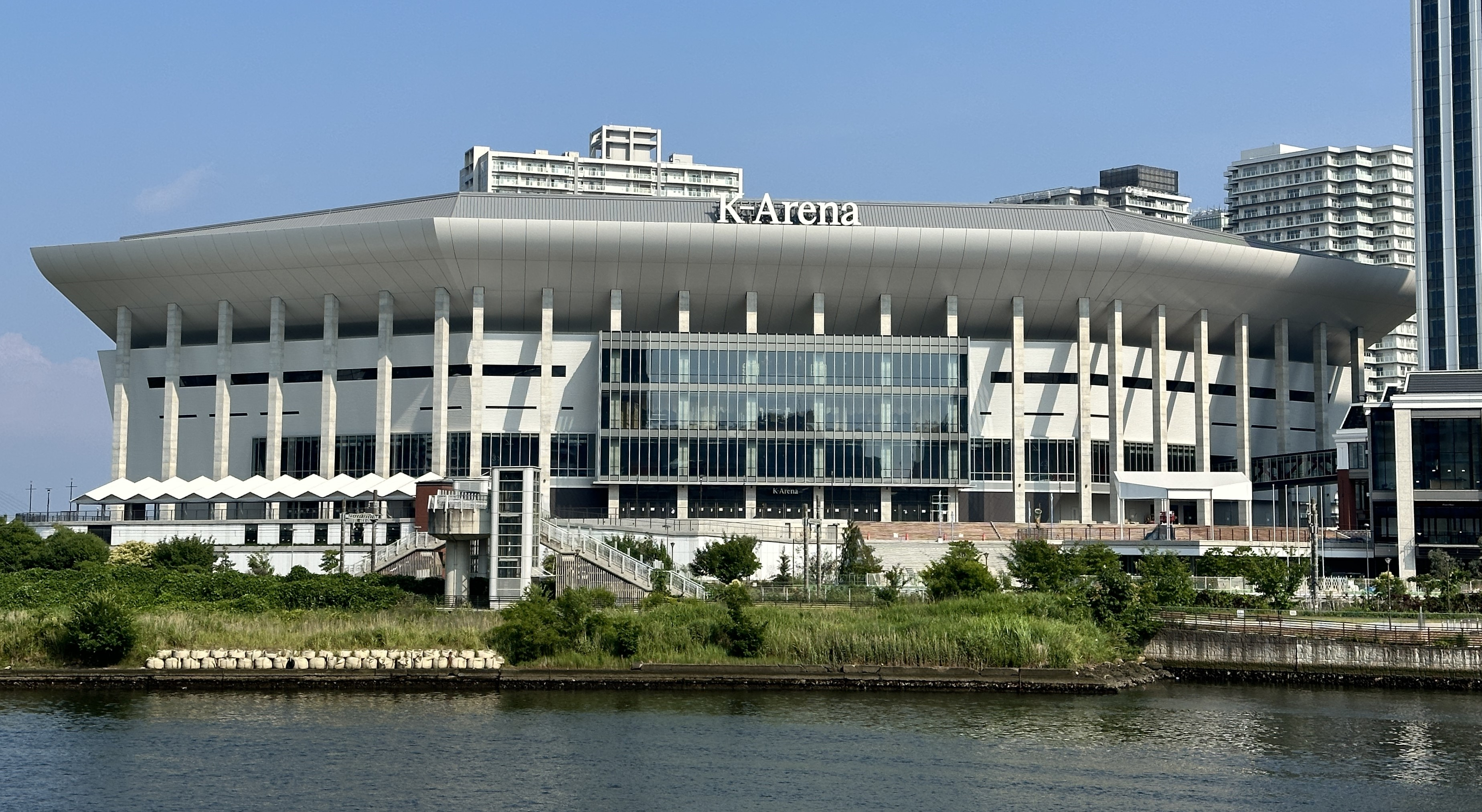
- K-Arena main entrance
- Interactive map of K-Arena Yokohama
- Location: 6–2–2 Minatomirai, Nishi-ku, Yokohama, Kanagawa, Japan
- Coordinates: 35°27′52″N 139°37′50″E
- Owner: Ken Corporation Group
- Operator: K-Arena Management
- Capacity: 20,000

Construction
- Groundbreaking: August 2020
- Opened: September 29, 2023
- Architects: Azusa Design; Kokuken; Kajima; WSP Global

K-Arena Yokohama (Kアリーナ横浜, K-Arīna Yokohama) is an indoor arena located in Yokohama, Kanagawa, Japan. It is advertised as "one of the world's biggest arena dedicated for music" with a capacity of 20,000 people. The arena opened on September 29, 2023, and is owned by the Ken Corporation Group.

== History ==
In the public tender for development operators in blocks 60 to 62 of Minato Mirai 21 conducted by Yokohama, the company's business proposal to develop a large-scale mixed-use complex consisting of a music-dedicated arena, hotel, and rental offices in blocks 60 and 61 was selected in November 2017. This project plan, named "K-Arena Project", received approval of the private urban regeneration project plan from the Minister of Land, Infrastructure, Transport and Tourism in February 2019.

K-Arena's construction started in August 2020, after a delay due to the COVID-19 pandemic. Construction was completed in July 2023 and the arena opened on September 29 of the same year.

As originally proposed, not only was a music-dedicated arena completed, the adjacent site also saw the completion of the Hilton Yokohama hotel and the K-Tower Yokohama office building. This entire development area is named "Music Terrace". Hilton Yokohama opened on September 24 of the same year, prior to the opening of this arena.

A concert series named "K-Arena Yokohama Grand Opening Series" starting with Yuzu's 3-day live shows ran until December 2023.

K-Arena ranked second in the world on the 2024 Top 200 Arena Tickets chart by Pollstar, after Madison Square Garden. It then ranked first in the world on the 2025 Top 10 Arena Tickets chart by Pollstar.

The Takashima Waterfront Deck, which had been planned since the construction of the arena, opened on March 27, 2025.

K-Arena was named among the 2026 Arena Stars by the IQ magazine.

== Facilities ==
The arena's seating is shaped like a fan-shaped heading to the stage, ensuring all audiences get to see the stage and audio.

The arena has hosted events by numerous artists. (Note: Search by year and month in the archive page.)

In addition to music events, the arena can also accommodate the use of MICE tourism.

== See also ==
- List of indoor arenas in Japan
