= Idol Renaissance =

Japanese idol girl group

- Origin: Japan
- Genres: J-pop
- Years active: 2014–2018
- Labels: SME (2014), T-Palette Records (2015-2018)
- Members: Noa Arai; Nanako Higa; Maina Minamibata; Riko Ishino; Marin Miyamoto; Koyoi Momooka; Suzuka Harada; Yumeka Nomoto
- Past members: Kana Hashimoto
- Website: idolrenaissance.com

Idol Renaissance (アイドルネッサンス) was a Japanese idol girl group under Sony Music Artists and T-Palette records. The group was debuted in 2014 to commemorate the 40th anniversary of SMA. They participated in the 2014-2017 Tokyo Idol Festival. Their single "Funny Bunny" reached the 22nd place on the Weekly Oricon Singles Chart.

== Discography ==
=== Albums ===
T-Palette
Release date	Title	Oricon (Note: Peak ranking on the weekly Oricon Albums Chart.)	Ref.	Tracklist
March 22, 2016	アワー・ソングス	44		1. YOU (orig. Senri Oe); 2. 初恋 (Orig. Kozo Murashita); 3. ベステンダンク (Orig. Hiroshi Takano); 4. あの娘ぼくがロングシュート決めたらどんな顔するだろう (Orig. Yasuyuki Okamura); 5. タイム・トラベル (Orig. Harada Shinji); 6. 夏の決心 (Orig. Senri Oe); 7. STILL LOVE HER（失われた風景）(Orig. TM NETWORK); 8. -skit-; 9. 17才 (Orig. Base Ball Bear); 10. 太陽と心臓 (Orig. Tokyo Ska Paradise Orchestra); 11. 金曜日のおはよう (Orig. HoneyWorks); 12. 恋する感覚 (Orig. Base Ball Bear); 13. ガリレオのショーケース (Orig. Unison Square Garden); 14. Yeah! Yeah! Yeah! (Orig. androp); 15. Funny Bunny (Orig. the pillows)

=== Mini-albums ===
T-Palette
Release date	Title	Oricon	Ref.	Tracklist
August 8, 2017	前髪がゆれる*	30		1. 交感ノート; 2. Blue Love Letter; 3. 5センチメンタル; 4. 前髪; 5. 交感ノート(inst); 6. Blue Love Letter(inst); 7. 5センチメンタル(inst); 8. 前髪(inst)

*First original content by Idol Renaissance.

=== Singles ===
Sony Music Artists' Label
Release date	Title	Oricon (Note: Peak ranking on the weekly Oricon Singles Chart.)	Ref.	Tracklist
July 7, 2014	"17才"			1. 17才 (Orig. Base Ball Bear); 2. どかーん (Orig. Magokoro Brothers)
November 24, 2014	"太陽と心臓/初恋 "			1. 太陽と心臓 (Orig. Tokyo Ska Paradise Orchestra); 2. 初恋 (Orig. Kozo Murashita)
T-Palette
Release date	Title	Oricon	Ref.	Tracklist
March 24, 2015	"YOU"	41		1. YOU (Orig. Senri Oe); 2. 恋する感覚 (Orig. Base Ball Bear); 3. Good day Sunshine (Orig. SAWA); 4. ドカン行進曲（己編）(Orig. Inazuma Sentai)
July 28, 2015	"夏の決心"	38		1. 夏の決心 (Orig. Senri Oe); 2. Happy Endで始めよう (Orig. Eiichi Ohtaki); 3. Dear, Summer Friend (Orig. Magokoro Brothers)
December 22, 2015	"Funny Bunny"	22		1. Funny Bunny (Orig. the pillows); 2. Music Lovers (Orig. Jerry Lee Phantom); 3. シルエット (Orig. KANA-BOON)
July 26, 2016	"君の知らない物語"	44		1. 君の知らない物語 (Orig. Supercell); 2. 夏が来た! (Orig. Misato Watanabe); 3. トラベラーズ・ハイ (Orig. Sukima Switch)

Digital Singles

T-Palette
Release date	Title	Tracklist
October 27, 2015	"タイム・トラベル/Lucky"	
November 24, 2015	"雪が降る町/ガリレオのショーケース"	

== DVDs ==
Release date	Title	Oricon (Note: Peak ranking on the weekly Oricon DVD Chart.)	Ref.
February 23, 2016	1st ワンマンライブ エビスではじまるネッサンス!!	102	
