= Remi Matsuo =

Japanese musician (born 1991)

Remi Matsuo 松尾レミ
- Born: December 7, 1991 (age 34); Toyooka, Nagano, Japan
- Genre: Rock
- Occupations: Musician, singer-songwriter, artist
- Instruments: Vocals, guitar
- Years active: 2007–present
- Member of: Glim Spanky

Remi Matsuo (Japanese: 松尾レミ; born December 7, 1991) is a Japanese musician, singer-songwriter, and artist. She is best known as vocalist and rhythm guitarist of the rock band Glim Spanky since 2007. Formed by Matsuo in her first year of high school, the group made their major label debut in 2014 and consists of her and lead guitarist Hiroki Kamemoto. She is known for her husky vocals, and frequently collaborates with and writes songs for other artists.

== Early life and formation of Glim Spanky ==
Matsuo was born in the rural country village of Toyooka, Nagano, Japan on December 7, 1991. Her parents operate Happy Days, a shop founded in November 1999 that sells collectables, records and other miscellaneous goods. She has a younger sister, who attended fashion school. Many of her relatives, including her grandfather, were painters and Remi entered drawing competitions as a child. Her father, Akira, has a large record collection and she grew up listening to classic rock, but found the sound of vinyl records to be old-fashioned and muffled. She also heard Shibuya-kei played at home as a child, and came to admire Maki Nomiya. In junior high school, Matsuo learned to play guitar from an adult acquaintance. She was then shocked when she heard the White Stripes. They recorded with analog equipment, but had a contemporary sound quality. This saw her fall in love with classic rock, and she started listening to the Beatles and Led Zeppelin and watching Woodstock DVDs. Having wanted to become a painter since the age of two, Matsuo said after falling in love with music in junior high, she desired to do both. She realized she could achieve this by starting a band; she could sing songs and design the album covers and merchandise. Matsuo attended Matsukawa High School, where she was vice president of the student council in her third year. Her favorite band in high school was Bump of Chicken. When a member of the band would recommend a classic rock act on the radio, she went to her father's record collection and listened to not only to the recommendation, but any related works as well.

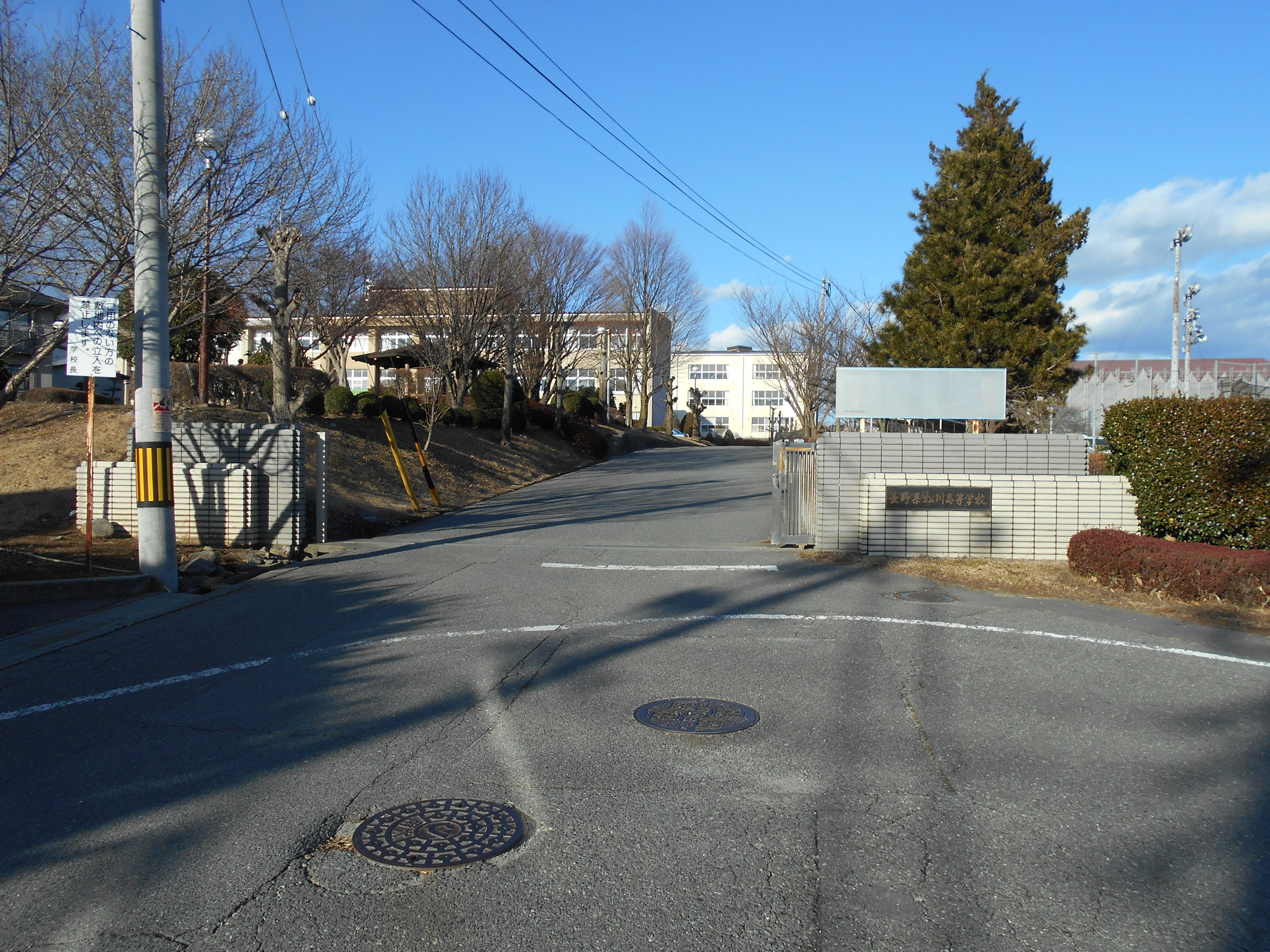
Matsuo formed Glim Spanky with classmates at Matsukawa High School.

Matsuo formed Glim Spanky in May of her first year of high school to perform at the school's 2007 cultural festival. The band's name comes from Matsuo's interest in Celtic culture and fantasy literature; she read a book describing a goblin's "glim" and added "spank" to describe their aggressive drive towards the music industry. The bassist and other guitarist quit after the festival, but Matsuo wanted to play another live in a week and recruited an upperclassman to play bass as a three-piece. Eventually, the bassist assumed it was difficult for Matsuo to play all of the guitar by herself and recruited another guitarist into the band without her permission in November; Hiroki Kamemoto. Matsuo found that Kamemoto was not only committed to the band, but was also able to immediately understand and provide the guitar parts she wanted for songs. They then began writing their own material and started focusing on the band full time. Matsuo said she felt she could not express her feelings if the songs were not her own. Kamemoto noted that Matsuo's parents and their acquaintances were all writing original songs, so it only felt natural for them to do so as well. Matsuo would go to the closed down karaoke bar they rented in Iida, Nagano directly after school, practice all day, and have her parents pick her up at night. On days off from school, they would practice from 8:00 in the morning, until 1:00 am at night.

Glim Spanky won the Rock Banchō held by Sony Music in December 2008 and were finalists at the 2009 Senko Riot, a nation-wide teenage artists-only festival held by Sony, Tokyo FM, and au. They were one of 14 finalists chosen out of 5,500 groups to perform at the latter. Matsuo said that before Senko Riot, adults in her hometown would laugh at her when she told them she wanted to make a living in music, but the other acts she met there showed her it was not a pipe dream and she decided to move to Tokyo to make her dream a reality. Matsuo enrolled in the design department of Nihon University's College of Art. She chose the college because she felt, with its film and photography departments and Tokyo location, it had everything she would need for her band activities. However, her father strongly felt she should attend a foreign university and Matuso said it might have been harder to get his permission than it was to study for the entrance exam. Glim Spanky's bassist and drummer decided to stay in Nagano and although the older Kamemoto was already attending Aichi Gakuin University in Nagoya, he transferred to the closer Dokkyo University so he and Matsuo could continue the band in Tokyo.

== Career ==
Matsuo and Kamemoto resumed Glim Spanky activities as a duo in April 2010, utilizing support musicians. Matsuo stated that their first four years playing live houses in Tokyo were difficult, but because they were particular about their sound, stage presence, costumes and artwork, she was confident that the music industry would not leave behind a band with such a complete package. Glim Spanky had their first release in December 2013 when Space Shower Music released the mini-album Music Freak nationwide. In June 2014 the band released their second mini-album and their major label debut, Shōsō, via EMI R (now known as Virgin Records). They have since released six full-length studio albums, with 2017's Bizarre Carnival being their highest-charting to date.

In 2014, Matsuo covered Janis Joplin's song "Move Over" for a Suzuki Wagon R Stingray commercial in 2014. Its positive reception resulted in Glim Spanky recording their own version. That year, Matsuo also contributed guest vocals to the song "Nightfever" by Analogfish.

A live duet performance of Pizzicato Five's "Superstar" between Matsuo and Maki Nomiya is included on Nomiya's 2017 album Vacances Shibuya-kei wo Utau – Wonderful Summer. Matsuo has provided several songs to other recording artists, where she is credited for the lyrics and co-credited for the music together with Kamemoto as Glim Spanky. Such as 2019's "Lady May", which they gave to the idol group Momoiro Clover Z, "From the Seeds", a song that Mone Kamishiraishi sang as the opening theme for the 2020 second season of the 7 Seeds anime and which Matsuo participated in the chorus on, and "Kagami yo Kagami", a song they provided to the virtual singer KAF.

As part of Glim Spanky, Matsuo collaborated with Tomoyasu Hotei on the song "Savage Sun", which they co-composed and co-performed for his 2020 album Soul to Soul, and worked with Kamishiraishi again on covers of "Aozora" by the Blue Hearts and "Ikareta Baby" by Fishmans for her 2021 album Ano Uta -2-. Also in 2021, they provided the song "Mikansei na Drama" to the band DISH, before releasing their own version. For 2022's Āya to Majo Songbook 13 Lime Avenue, a soundtrack of the 2020 anime film Earwig and the Witch that is credited to the fictional band "Earwig", Glim Spanky contributed the songs "The House in Lime Avenue" and "A Black Cat". Matsuo wrote, composed, produced and sang backing vocals on "Candy Moon" for Nomiya's 2022 album New Beautiful. In 2023, she rewrote Salasa's song "Hi o Tsukete" and is a featured artist on the new version. She is also featured on the Bawdies' January 2024 song "Scream" and appears in its music video, and on Kujira's June 2024 song "Baby". Matsuo and Kamemoto wrote the song "Sweet Magic" for Lisa's 2026 album Lace Up.

Since 2017, Matsuo and Glim Spanky have appeared numerous times on the NHK television show The Covers, where recording artists discuss songs and perform covers. Matsuo and Kamemoto have made three guest acting appearances in the TV Asahi show Keishichō Sōsa Ichikachō, for which they contributed several theme songs. They appeared in episode six of 2017's second season as passersby, in the sixth episode of 2018's season three as street musicians, and in episode 16 of 2020's fourth season as different street performers.

== Other work ==
Matsuo has cited Paul Delvaux and Max Ernst as some of her favorite painters. She designs many of the covers to Glim Spanky's releases and much of their merchandise. For example, she designed the T-shirt and supervised the zine included in limited editions of their album Looking for the Magic (2018), and designed the fanny pack sold with a limited edition of their single "Story no Saki ni" (2019). In 2017, merchandise featuring Matsuo's variation on the Rolling Stones' tongue and lips logo was sold as part of an official collaboration between the English band and Glim Spanky. She took the selfie used as the artwork for her band's cover of "Whiskey ga, Osuki Desho" (2022), and designed the logo used in 2024 for the 10th anniversary of their major label debut. Matsuo created the lyric video for "Ai ga Michiru Made", Glim Spanky's 2024 collaboration with Love Psychedelico, by creating an illustration of the two bands.

From October 2015 to January 2017, Matsuo wrote a column on the website FanplusMusic titled "LOVE FAV LIFE". The monthly series featured illustrations she drew of her favorite everyday objects. Matsuo designed stuffed animals that appear in the 2016 film Hentaida. In 2019, she designed the cover art used for the song "Motorcycle Weekender" by the band Glider. Matsuo also designed the cover and booklet of Glider's 2020 album Eisei Amūto.

== Songwriting and musicianship ==
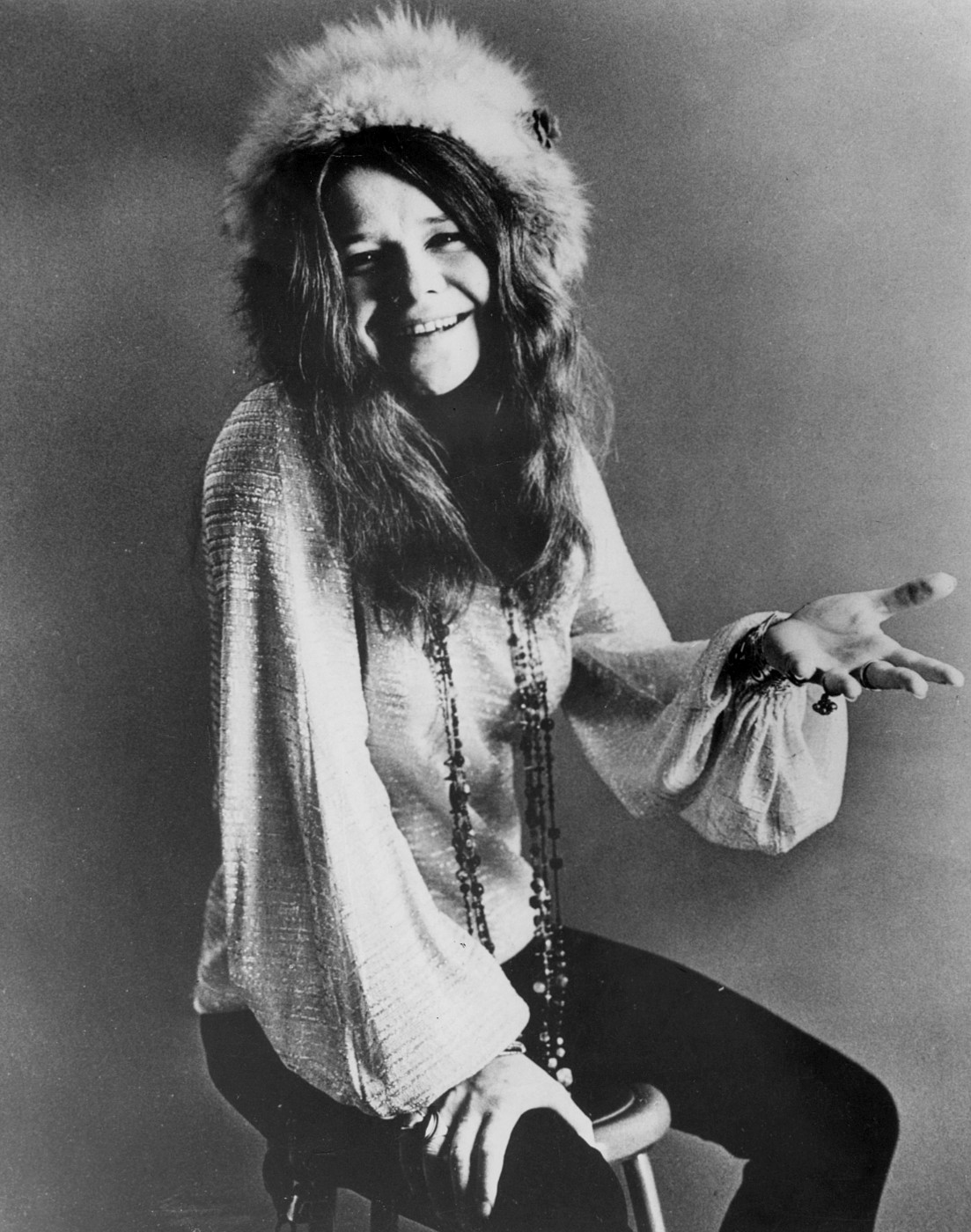
Matsuo's voice was dubbed the "second coming of Janis Joplin".

Matsuo is known for her husky vocals, and has been said to have a "once in a decade voice". Her voice is frequently compared to that of Janis Joplin. However, she is not a particular fan of Joplin and this comparison and the subsequent assumption that she was influenced by her because she covered one song for a commercial bothered Matsuo until Kamemoto convinced her it was a positive thing. Due to her unique voice, Matsuo struggled with singing in primary school and junior high. But after noticing that John Lennon's voice had a rough quality to it in songs such as "Help!", she realized that her voice would suit rock music well. She has cited the Beatles, the Who, Led Zeppelin, Jimi Hendrix and Joni Mitchell as influences. Matsuo said that, although she loves old rock music, she does not want people to label Glim Spanky a nostalgic band and wants to convey that they are connected to the music of today. She has also said that while cool music is a prerequisite, she puts extreme importance on appearance and believes that being a rock star is 98% looks. A belief that she speculates is due to the influence of Shibuya-kei.

Matsuo is the principal songwriter of Glim Spanky's lyrics and music, but when she only has a guitar riff, chord progression or drum phrase before working with Kamemoto to turn it into a song, then both get credited for the music as Glim Spanky. The singer stated that she wants to write music that evokes imagery within the mind of its listeners; "I want to show pictures with sound." Additionally, just like how Japanese people appreciate the music of Western artists without understanding the English lyrics, she wants to write lyrics that people from other countries can appreciate despite not knowing Japanese. Matsuo has said that to write, she needs to become the main character of the song. Her songwriting can be divided into two styles, one being what Shin Francis Miyagi of i-D called "lyrical poetry for surviving in the real world", where her emotions have reached their limit and the lyrics just pour out. This style is represented by songs such as "Homero yo" and "Ikari o Kure yo". The other is narrative songs about a fantasy world. Matsuo achieves this style by darkening a room, lighting candles, opening a book of fantasy literature or surrealist paintings, and filling the room with incense until "tripping" into another world. The words, melody and chords come to her all at once. An example of a song composed in this vein is "Midnight Circus". Matsuo opined that while rock music tends to be thought of as something rebellious or aggressive, she believes that love is at the root of rock music; "Rock is about love, hope, peace... That's what I sing about." She has admitted to sometimes being brought to tears while singing because feelings that she normally can not bring herself to say, come out in songs. Matsuo has stated that one of her recurring lyrical themes is "What is an adult?". She believes that the adults who laughed at her childhood dream of making music once had dreams of their own, but society often forces us to hide our "pure heart" from others and she wants to open their hearts and minds through her music.

== Equipment ==
Matsuo has around 10 guitars. Due to her love of The Beatles, she is usually seen playing a Fireglo Rickenbacker 330, and also owns a black Rickenbacker 325. She also continues to use the first guitar she ever owned, a Gibson Les Paul Special that was probably made in the late 1980s and has had its pickups replaced and other modifications. In her third year of junior high, she visited a friend of her father to have him teach her how to re-string a guitar. He gave her the Les Paul Special to commemorate her first time. Early in Glim Spanky's career, the Special and its P-100 pickup provided a thicker sound than the single coil guitar Kamemoto was using, so the two switched and used each other's instruments for a period of time. For acoustic play, Matsuo has used a Heritage Cherry Sunburst Gibson Hummingbird since the band's major debut in 2014. It is equipped with an L.R. Baggs Anthem pickup and regular gauge John Pearse strings. She has another model of the guitar, a 1960 Hummingbird Light Aged, which she described as having a deeper sound.

Matsuo uses Supro guitar amplifiers. She first encountered the brand via a 1965 model while recording Looking for the Magic (2018) in Los Angeles, and bought one of that same year once she returned to Japan. In addition to the brand's appearance and logo, she likes that their sound is not too clean and includes a "dirty element", and is particularly fond of the tremolo, which she found to evoke the psychedelic atmosphere of the 1960s. "I'm not a gear geek, so my selection criteria are purely instinctive, but I do value how much it connects to my identity and the culture I cherish." As of 2025, she was using a black Supro Delegate Custom.

== Discography ==
Work	Artist	Year	Role	Ref.
Saikin no Boku-ra (最近のぼくら)	Analogfish	2014	Guest vocalist on "Nightfever"	
Vacances Shibuya-kei wo Utau – Wonderful Summer (野宮真貴、ヴァカンス渋谷系を歌う。～Wonderful Summer～)	Maki Nomiya	2017	Featured artist on "Superstar"	
Momoiro Clover Z	Momoiro Clover Z	2019	Lyricist and co-composer (Note: Co-credit as part of Glim Spanky.) on "Lady May" (レディ・メイ)	
Note	Mone Kamishiraishi	2020	Lyricist, co-composer, and backing vocalist on "From the Seeds"	
X	DISH	2021	Lyricist and co-composer on "Mikansei na Drama" (未完成なドラマ)	
Ano Uta -2- (あの歌-2-)	Mone Kamishiraishi	2021	Co-arranger and backing vocalist on "Aozora" and "Ikareta Baby" (いかれたBABY)	
"Kagami yo Kagami" (鏡よ鏡)	KAF	2021	Lyricist and co-composer	
New Beautiful	Maki Nomiya	2022	Writer, co-arranger, producer, and backing vocalist on "Candy Moon"	
"Hi o Tsukete" (火をつけて)	Salasa	2023	Featured artist, co-writer	
"Scream"	The Bawdies	2024	Featured artist	
Inner Child	Kujira	2024	Featured artist on "Baby"	
Lace Up	Lisa	2026	Lyricist and co-composer on "Sweet Magic"	
"Kuraiai" (クライアイ)	Tsubame Amaya	2026	Lyricist and co-composer	
Bouquet	Mone Kamishiraishi	2026	Lyricist on "Trophy"	
