= Hiroki Kamemoto =

Japanese musician (born 1990)

Hiroki Kamemoto 亀本寛貴
- Born: August 24, 1990 (age 36); Iida, Nagano, Japan
- Genre: Rock
- Occupation: Musician
- Instrument: Guitar
- Years active: 2007–present
- Member of: Glim Spanky

Hiroki Kamemoto (Japanese: 亀本寛貴; born August 24, 1990) is a Japanese musician, best known as lead guitarist of the rock band Glim Spanky since 2007. Formed while the members were in high school, the group made their major label debut in 2014 and consists of Kamemoto and vocalist and rhythm guitarist Remi Matsuo.

== Early life and joining Glim Spanky ==
Hiroki Kamemoto was born in the rural Zakoji village of Iida, Nagano, Japan on August 24, 1990. He has a younger brother. Kamemoto has always been a fan of soccer and took lessons as a child. But because he was the only boy from his school there, he joined his elementary school's baseball club. The first CDs Kamemoto ever bought were SMAP's "Sekai ni Hitotsu Dake no Hana" and Naotarō Moriyama's "Sakura". However, he then fell in love with the rock bands Glay and L'Arc-en-Ciel, and realized he wanted to play music over soccer. He started playing guitar in his first year of high school after seeing bands like Glay on television. Kamemoto bought an electric guitar from a Yahoo! Auction for about 8,000 yen, but did not have enough money for an amplifier, and so played without one. He and a friend who was also just starting an instrument formed a band, and he became more and more engrossed in music.

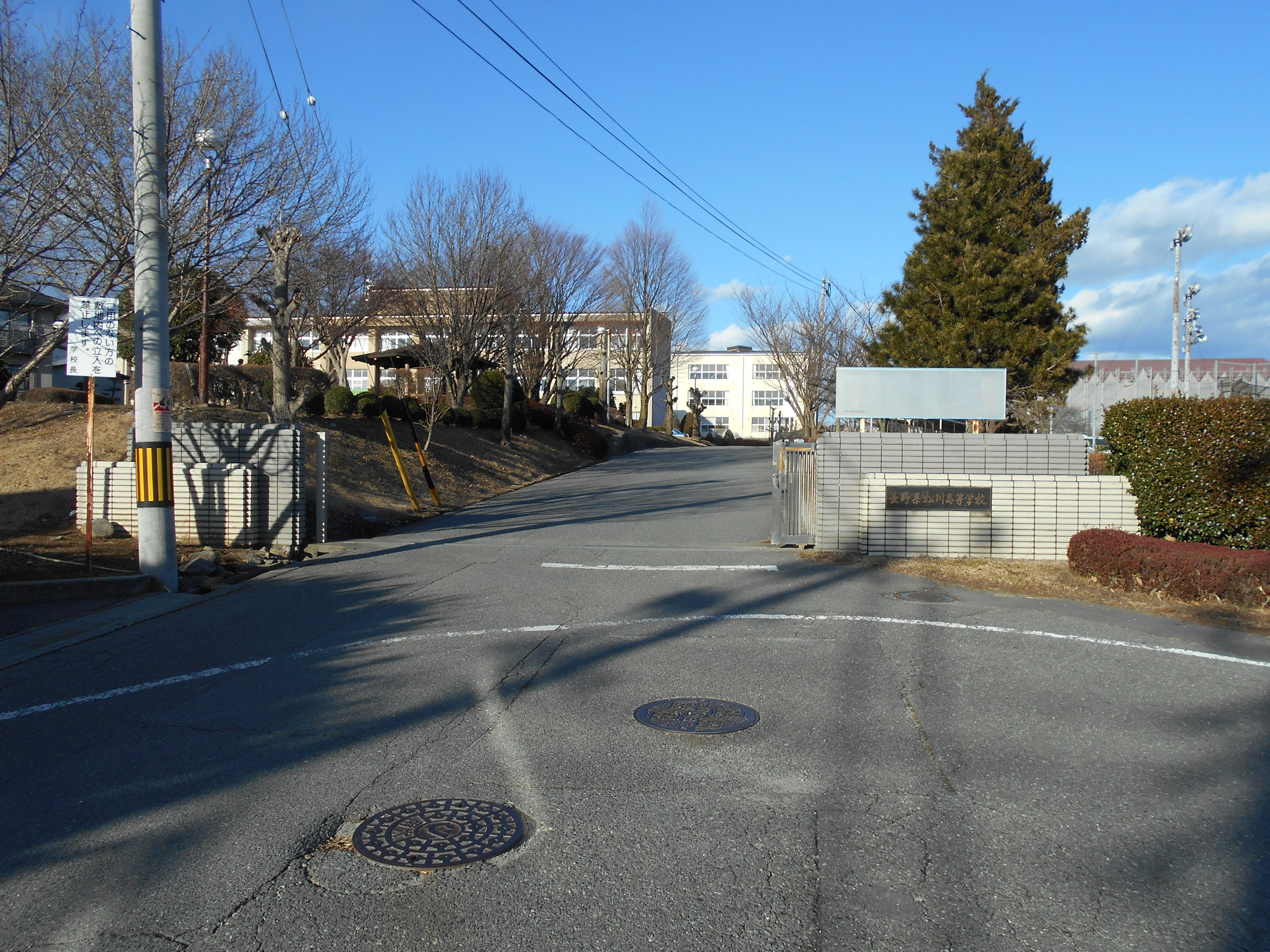
Kamemoto attended Matsukawa High School, where he joined Glim Spanky.

Kamemoto attended Matsukawa High School, where he was the president of the student council and a member of the soccer club. In 2007, a fellow student whom Kamemoto worked with at the same part-time job became the bassist for Glim Spanky, a band formed and fronted by their underclassman Remi Matsuo. In November, the bassist assumed it was difficult for Matsuo to sing and play all of the guitar by herself, and recruited Kamemoto into the band without her permission. However, Matsuo found that Kamemoto was not only committed to the band, but was also able to immediately understand and provide the guitar parts she wanted for songs. They then began writing their own material and started focusing on the band full time. Kamemoto noted that Matsuo's parents and their acquaintances were all writing original songs, so it only felt natural for them to do so as well. On days off from school, they would practice from 8:00 in the morning, until 1:00 am at night. By 2009, Kamemoto was attending Aichi Gakuin University in Nagoya, but traveled back to Nagano once a week for band activities. When the younger Matsuo enrolled in Nihon University's College of Art, Kamemoto transferred to the economics department of the closer Dokkyo University so the two could continue the band in Tokyo. Kamemoto explained that he had looked for musicians to form another band with in Nagoya, but could not find anyone good. Because he knew Matsuo was a good vocalist, he was confident they would be successful and said he had no hesitation transferring and moving to Tokyo. His parents told him he could go to Tokyo and play music during his four years of college, but that he must get a normal job after graduating. However, Kamemoto never had any intention of getting a company job and figured he just had to produce results in music within those four years.

== Career ==
Kamemoto and Matsuo resumed Glim Spanky activities as a duo in April 2010, utilizing support musicians. Matsuo stated that their first four years playing live houses in Tokyo were difficult, but because they were particular about their sound, stage presence, costumes and artwork, she was confident that the music industry would not leave behind a band with such a complete package. Glim Spanky had their first release in December 2013 when Space Shower Music released the mini-album Music Freak nationwide. In June 2014 the band released their second mini-album and their major label debut, Shōsō, via EMI R (now known as Virgin Records). They have since released six full-length studio albums, with 2017's Bizarre Carnival being their highest-charting to date.

Kamemoto composed the music to "Kill Bear", the ending theme song of the 2016 film Hentaida. He then provided guitar to the theme songs of the 2020 anime film Earwig and the Witch. For the film's 2022 album Āya to Majo Songbook 13 Lime Avenue, which is credited to the fictional band "Earwig", Kamemoto played on every track and Glim Spanky contributed the songs "The House in Lime Avenue" and "A Black Cat". Kamemoto was asked to produce and co-arrange Crispy Camera Club's 2022 song "Natsu no Nukegara". He is a featured artist playing lead guitar on the track and appears in its music video. In 2024, he composed the music to "Rain Bird" and "To the Mothership", two songs by singer Xai. He also played guitar on the 2024 song "Nande Desu ka?" by Nijisanji's virtual YouTuber Ryushen.

Kamemoto has also provided several songs to other recording artists, where he is credited as the arranger and co-credited for the music together with Matsuo as Glim Spanky. Such as 2019's "Lady May", which they gave to the idol group Momoiro Clover Z and which features Kamemoto on guitar, "From the Seeds", a song that Mone Kamishiraishi sang as the opening theme for the 2020 second season of the 7 Seeds anime and also features guitar by Kamemoto, and "Kagami yo Kagami", a song they provided to the virtual singer KAF.

As part of Glim Spanky, Kamemoto collaborated with Tomoyasu Hotei on the song "Savage Sun", which they co-composed and co-performed for his 2020 album Soul to Soul, and worked with Kamishiraishi again on covers of "Aozora" by The Blue Hearts and "Ikareta Baby" by Fishmans for her 2021 album Ano Uta -2-. Also in 2021, they provided the song "Mikansei na Drama" to the band DISH, which Kamemoto arranged and provided guitar to. Kamemoto co-arranged and played guitar on "Candy Moon" for Maki Nomiya's 2022 album New Beautiful. Kamemoto co-composed, arranged and played guitar on the song "Sweet Magic" for Lisa's 2026 album Lace Up.

Since 2017, Kamemoto and Glim Spanky have appeared numerous times on the NHK television show The Covers, where recording artists discuss songs and perform covers. Kamemoto and Matsuo have made three guest acting appearances in the TV Asahi show Keishichō Sōsa Ichikachō, for which they contributed several theme songs. They appeared in episode six of 2017's second season as passersby, in the sixth episode of 2018's season three as street musicians, and in episode 16 of 2020's fourth season as different street performers. Kamemoto appears in the music video for Keisuke Kuwata's 2022 song "Nagisa Hotel".

== Musicianship ==
Kamemoto started playing guitar because of Glay, then moved on to Nirvana, Guns N' Roses, Oasis, Jimi Hendrix and Cream. He started listening to Western music of the 1960s and 1970s because Matsuo insisted that he listen to it every day. When asked about the roots of his playing style, Kamemoto names Hendrix, Jimmy Page and Eric Clapton. He has studied the guitar playing of Glay's Hisashi, as well as Joe Bonamassa. When approaching a song, Kamemoto said he thinks about the tone and "touch" very carefully, and tries to match the image of the song. He makes a clear distinction in his guitar playing when there is singing and when there is not. When there are vocals, he emphasizes the layering of notes and the depth of the sound. When there is not, he plays the melody freely, as if his guitar were the vocalist. Kamemoto said he usually utilizes vibrato in his solos or extends notes. Kazunori Koudate of Aera Digital compared Kamemoto's guitar solos to those of Mick Taylor, and described his riffs as reminiscent of those by Robbie Robertson.

Matsuo is the principal songwriter of Glim Spanky's lyrics and music, but when she only has a guitar riff, chord progression or drum phrase before working with Kamemoto to turn it into a song, then both get credited for the music as Glim Spanky. Kamemoto is, however, frequently credited with a song's arrangement. "I am influenced by Remi", "I believe that she has a one-of-a-kind view of the world" and put a lot of effort into the arrangements in order to interpret the original songs she creates and make them sound like Glim Spanky. In arranging songs, the guitarist believes that the chorus is the most important part, followed by the intro. In his personal time, Kamemoto does not play the guitar much unless he is writing a song or has a rehearsal coming up and needs to remember a song he has not played in a while.

== Equipment ==
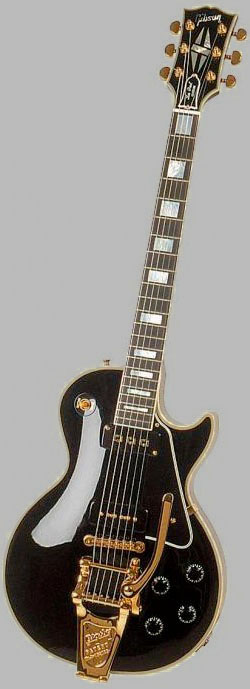
A Gibson Les Paul Custom, similar to the one Kamemoto uses

Kamemoto has around 25 guitars, and is usually seen playing the Gibson brand. He previously used a single coil guitar. But Matsuo's Gibson Les Paul Special with a P-100 pickup provided a thicker sound, so the two switched guitars and Kamemoto used her Special early in their career. After their debut, he bought a goldtop 2015 Les Paul Deluxe and it became his main guitar for both recording and live performances. In addition to liking its appearance, he said its mini-humbuckers give it a nuanced sound unlike any other guitar. In 2018, he bought a black Les Paul Custom around the time of Glim Spanky's Nippon Budokan concert. The Custom and a walnut colored 1972 semi-acoustic Gibson ES-345 were said to be his favorites as of 2023. Both have whammy bars, specifically Bigsby vibrato tailpieces, which are uncommon on Gibson guitars. He also has a blue guitar by Aichi-based Truth Guitars that has the body shape of a Jazzmaster, but a rear pickup like that of a Telecaster. Kamemoto never owned an acoustic guitar until he made his major label debut, at which point he bought a Gibson J-45. It is equipped with a Fishman Rare Earth Blend Soundhole pickup and GHS Phosphor Bronze S325 (012-054 gauge) strings. He also has a Gibson HP 835 Supreme, which he uses to play acoustic lead, while the ES-345 is used for accompaniment.

In an interview about Walking on Fire (2020), Kamemoto said he mainly used a Marshall Super Lead Model 1959 amplifier for recording, and occasionally a Fender Deluxe Reverb. He wanted a Marshall Super Lead because of its use by Jimi Hendrix and Jimmy Page, but found it too loud, so he took tubes out to use it as a 50-watt amp. However, he still found it loud and therefore uses a smaller version for live performances. He also uses his roadie's Shinos 50-watt amp. For arranging songs, he uses a Korg nanoKey2 MIDI keyboard, which is compact for use on the go.

As of 2020, Kamemoto had two guitar pedalboards. The smaller vertical one had a volume pedal, a wah pedal, an EarthQuaker Swiss Things, an Electro-Harmonix Nano POG, and EarthQuaker's Bit Commander and Tentacle pedals. The larger horizontal one was organized into two halves; one had a Providence PEC-2 with a KarDian overdrive, a Manlay Sound M-200, a Manlay Sound Ronno Bender, an EarthQuaker Black Ash and a MXR EQ, while the other has a Free the Tone with an Arion phaser, a Lunar Echo for strong delay, a Malekko for soft delay and an EarthQuaker Levitation for reverb. In 2024, Kamemoto's pedalboard for acoustic play had a Korg DT-10 tuner, an MXR M76 Studio Compressor, an L.R. Baggs Session saturator/compressor, and a Rupert Neve Designs DI unit. He used the L.R. Baggs when playing arpeggios or when the arrangement included piano or strings, and would also add the M76 when playing single note solos.

== Discography ==
| Work | Artist | Year | Role | Ref. |
|---|---|---|---|---|
| Hentaida Original Sound Tracks | Film soundtrack | 2016 | Composer of "Kill Bear" | |
| Momoiro Clover Z | Momoiro Clover Z | 2019 | Co-composer (Note: Co-credit as part of Glim Spanky.), arranger, and guitar on "Lady May" (レディ・メイ) | |
| Note | Mone Kamishiraishi | 2020 | Co-composer, arranger, and guitar on "From the Seeds" | |
| Earwig and the Witch Soundtrack | Film soundtrack | 2021 | Guitar on "Don't Disturb Me" and "Atashi no Sekai Seifuku" | |
| X | DISH | 2021 | Co-composer, arranger, and guitar on "Mikansei na Drama" (未完成なドラマ) | |
| Ano Uta -2- (あの歌-2-) | Mone Kamishiraishi | 2021 | Co-arranger and guitar on "Aozora" and "Ikareta Baby" (いかれたBABY) | |
| "Kagami yo Kagami" (鏡よ鏡) | KAF | 2021 | Co-composer and arranger | |
| Earwig and the Witch Songbook: 13 Lime Avenue | Earwig | 2022 | Guitar on every song, co-composer and arranger on "The House in Lime Avenue" and "A Black Cat" | |
| New Beautiful | Maki Nomiya | 2022 | Co-arranger and guitar on "Candy Moon" | |
| "Natsu no Nukegara" (夏のぬけがら) | Crispy Camera Club | 2022 | Featured artist, producer, co-arranger, and lead guitar | |
| Waves | Xai | 2024 | Composer of "Rain Bird" and "To the Mothership" | |
| Itadakimasu no Susume | Ryushen | 2024 | Guitar on "Nande Desu ka?" (なんでですか？) | |
| "Sono Hitomi de" (その瞳で) | Xai | 2025 | Co-composer and arranger | |
| Lace Up | Lisa | 2026 | Co-composer, arranger, and guitar on "Sweet Magic" | |
| "Harukaze" (春風) | Xai | 2026 | Composer and arranger | |
| "Kuraiai" (クライアイ) | Tsubame Amaya | 2026 | Co-composer, arranger, guitar, bass and programming | |
| Bouquet | Mone Kamishiraishi | 2026 | Composer, co-producer and guitar on "Trophy" | |
