= The Bawdies =

Japanese rock band

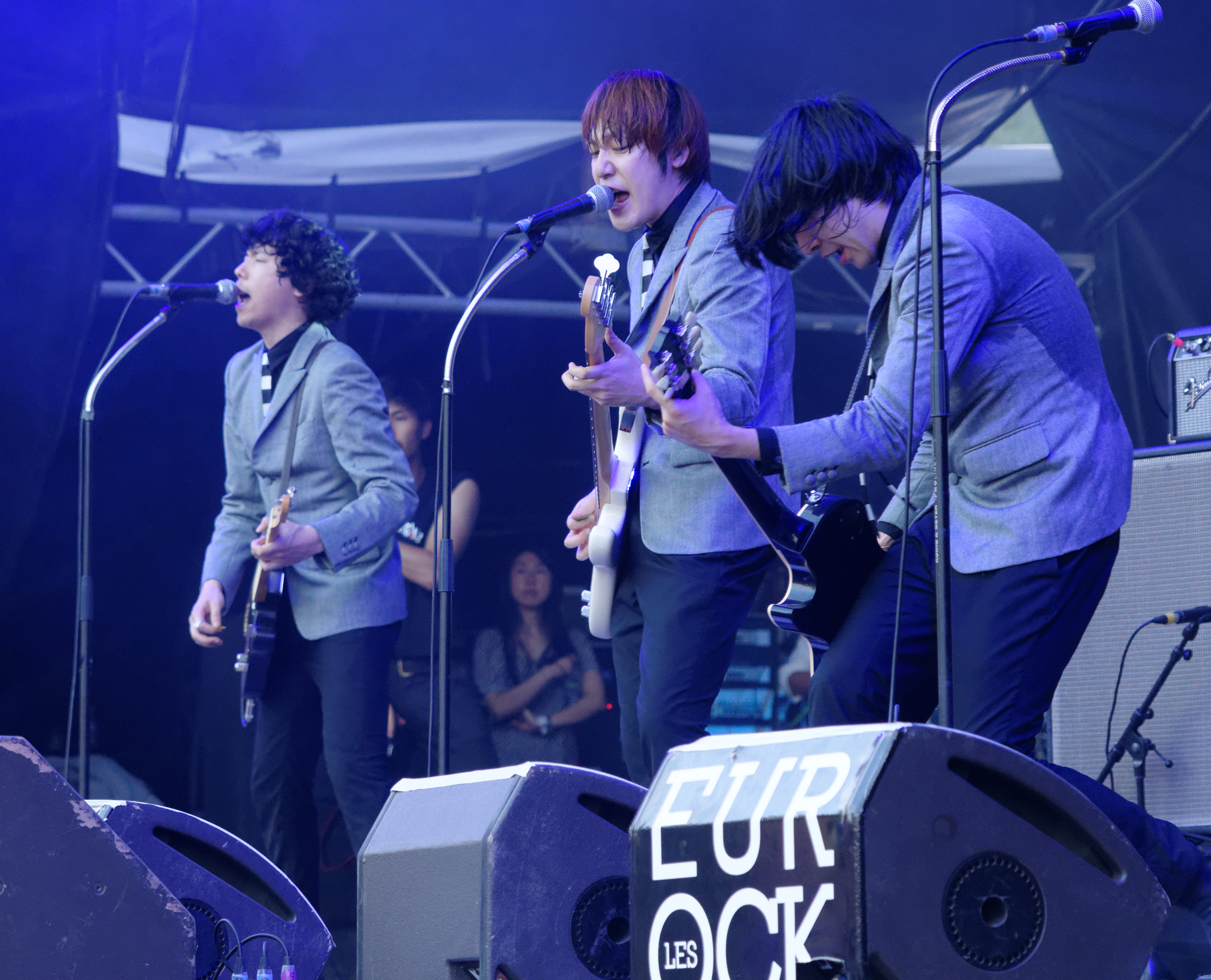
- The Bawdies in July 2015

Background information
- Origin: Japan
- Genres: Rock, beat music, rhythm & blues
- Years active: 2004–Present
- Labels: Seez Records (2006-2025; Getting Better (2009-present); Hotdog Records (2025-present)
- Members: Roy; Taxman; Jim; Marcy
- Website: thebawdies.com

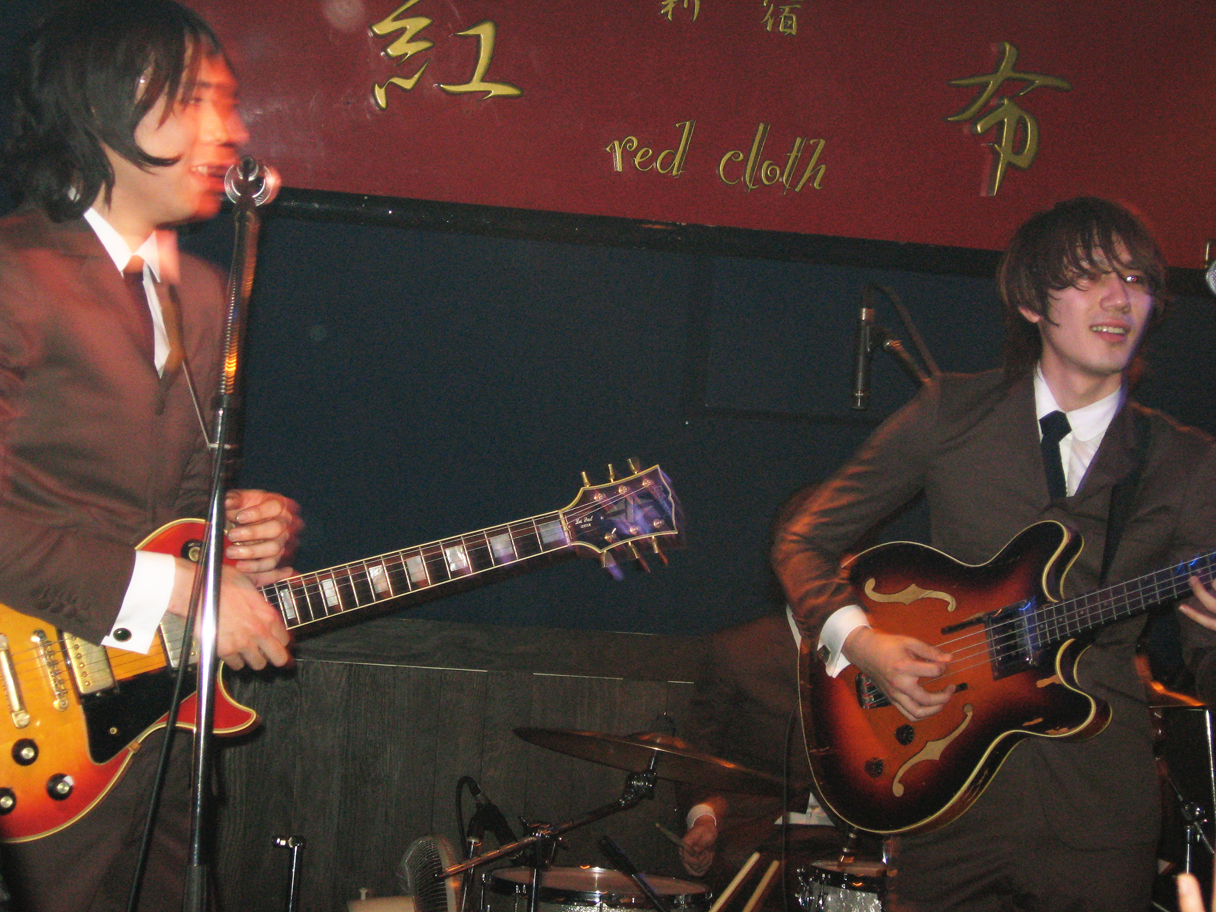
The Bawdies 1 @ Red Cloth, 2007-03-31

The Bawdies is a Tokyo-based, Japanese rock band that has been active since 2004. The band is heavily influenced by 1950s-1960s beat music, garage punk, and early rhythm & blues.

== Background ==
Band members Ryo 'Roy' Watanabe (b.July 7,1983), Yoshihiko 'Jim' Kimura (b. May 26, 1983), and Masahiko ‘Marcy’ Yamaguchi (b. November 8, 1983) became friends while attending elementary school in Setagaya, Tokyo. They met fourth member Taku "Taxman" Funayama (b. November 21, 1983), when he joined the basketball team in which the other three were members. After retiring from the basketball team in their final year of high school the four switched their focus to music. While at Tower Records, Shibuya, Watanabe and Kimura discovered The Sonics, a 1960s American garage band, which influenced their musical direction significantly. The Bawdies are also well known for Watanabe's distinctive soul-infused vocal style, which is influenced by Little Richard, Wilson Pickett, Otis Redding and Ray Charles.While the band has been compared to The Beatles is some news stories, musically they share more commonality with American garage and rhythm & blues genres.

== Formation, Yesterday and Today, Awaking of Rhythm and Blues 2004 – 2008 ==
The band was formed on New Year's Day in 2004. and released their first album, Yesterday and Today, a mix of the band's original tracks and covers, through independent label Seez Records in March 2006. Their first single ‘I Beg You’ was released from the EP of the same name in March 2007. The EP release coincided with their first sold-out headline show at Shinjuku's Red Cloth in April Their first overseas tour was in June of that year, with the band playing eight performances across Australia with Dallas Crane and The Basics. Upon their return, they had their first appearance at Fuji Rock Festival on the Rookie A-Go-Go Stage in July. Second album, Awaking of Rhythm and Blues was released through Seez Records in February 2008 and featured all original tracks. This was followed by their first national tour culminating with a show at Shibuya's Club Quattro. The Bawdies’ made their first appearance at ROCK IN JAPAN FESTIVAL, playing the Seaside Stage in August. The band returned to Australia in November for their second tour with The Basics and played the Queenscliff Music Festival in December.

== This Is My Story, There's No Turning Back, Live the Life I Love 2009 – 2011 ==
This Is My Story, released in April 2009, was the band's major label debut on the Getting Better sub-label of Victor Entertainment. Produced in part by Naoki Sato from Love Psychedelico the album reached # 1 on the iTunes Store rock chart and # 4 on the J-Pop album chart soon after its release. The album featured the singles ‘Emotion Potion’ and ‘You Gotta Dance’ and received praise from English "modfather" Paul Weller. In January 2010, the band received the favorite Japanese act award at the CD Shop Awards. Second album There's no Turning Back followed in April 2010 and saw the band again working with Naoki of Love Psychedelico. The album was preceded by singles ‘It's Too Late’ and ‘Hot Dog’ (#7 Oricon Chart, #3 on Japan Hot 100 Chart).

During the There's No Turning Back tour, the band was involved in a car accident while travelling between shows. They postponed five shows while Jim and Marcy recovered from injuries sustained. During this enforced break, Taxman and Roy attended the postponed shows and met with fans. The band returned as a foursome on October 11, the show was filmed for the DVD Live at AX 20101011. That same year the band also started appearing a monthly segment on Space Shower TV, called Bawdies A-Go-Go. The segment ran regularly until 2014.

Also in 2010, the band's single ‘Just Be Cool’ reached #8 on the Oricon chart, and #5 on the Japan Hot 100. The single was the first released from third album Live the Life I Love in June 2011, and was followed by 'Love You Need You', which featured singer and rapper Ai sharing main lead vocals. The track peaked at #3 on the Japan Hot 100 in April 2011. Production of the album was impacted by the Great Tohoku Earthquake and two tracks ‘A New Day is Coming’ and ‘Yeah’ were the last to be recorded for the album and were written in response to the disaster.

The Live the Life I Love Tour concluded its 38-date run at Nippon Budokan where the band played in front of an audience of 12,898 people, marking a significant milestone for the band. During the show, the band announced that they would undertake a Japan tour with The Sonics. The tour took place in March 2012. According to Roy, the experience of playing alongside their greatest influence was ‘as if being blessed by the creator’.

== 1-2-3, Going Back Home, Boys, New 2012 – 2017 ==
Single ‘Red Rocket Ship’ was released ahead of the band's appearance at Nippon Budokan and was the first from fourth album 1-2-3. The year-long production on 1-2-3 was longer than that of their previous releases and saw the band experimenting with both songwriting and recording. Released in January 2013, the album peaked at #2 on the Oricon Chart and featured further singles ‘Rock Me Baby’ and ‘Lemonade’, which both peaked at #6 on the Oricon Chart. The band expanded their audience throughout Japan as ‘Rock Me Baby’ was selected as the theme song for the 2012 Fuji TV drama Hungry! (ハングリー!). The song ‘1-2-3’, is a bonus track on the album and recording of the song is featured on the documentary A Day in the 1-2-3 that accompanied the original CD release.

The 1-2-3 Tour began in February 2013 and was the band's first all prefecture tour totaling 59 performances, including Yokohama Arena, culminating at Osaka-jo Hall on June 28. The band followed the tour with an appearance at Fuji Rock Festival, appearing on the Green Stage. In October, the band undertook their first Asian tour, playing Grand Mint Festival in South Korea as well as shows in Taiwan and Hong Kong. Their 2013 touring schedule concluded with a three date co-headlining Japan tour with American soul singer Eli ‘Paperboy’ Reed.

To mark the band's 10 anniversary since formation and the fifth since their major label debut, The Bawdies released Going Back Home in March 2014. The album features covers of rhythm and blues artists that had inspired the band, including tracks from Ray Charles, Howlin’ Wolf, Sam & Dave and Sam Cooke amongst others.

The double A-side single ‘Nice and Slow' / 'Come On’ was released in June that same year and was the first to be taken from their fifth studio album Boys!, which followed in December. The film clips for Boys! also marked the band's first collaboration with director Shogo Kusano. The Boys! Tour 2014-2015 concluded on March 29 with the band's second appearance at Nippon Budokan.

In July the band embarked on their first European tour, playing shows in Düsseldorf, Paris and London as well as France's largest rock festival Les Eurokeennes in Belfort. In October the band embarked on the national Rock The House Tour 2015 and in the same month, the single ‘Sunshine’ was released with Ryosuke Nagaoka of Petrolz acting as producer. The band's next release was the split single ‘Rockin’ Zombies’ with labelmate go! go! vanillas, featuring both band's individual singles (‘45's' and ‘Hinky Dinky Party Crew’) as well as each band covering a song of the other (‘It's Too Late’ and ‘Counter Action'). The release was celebrated with a national co-headlining tour as well as a free show at Yoyogi Park.

Sixth album, New was released in February 2017 and featured lead single ‘The Edge’. The CD release included an eponymous short film directed by Shogo Kusano. The release of the album coincided with their first solo headlining tour in two years. The New Beat Tour 2017 totaled 33 performances around Japan. This was followed by the See the Rock! Feel The Roll tour, which included the band playing alongside videos created by Kusano.

== This is the Best, Section #11, Blast Off! 2018 - 2021 ==
This is the Best was released in April 2018 and includes all of their previously released singles as well as a new track ‘Feelin’ Free’. Upon the release of the compilation, the band completed their second all prefecture tour, totaling 49 performances. The tour culminated in their third appearance at Nippon Budokan on January 17, 2019. In November that year the band released their seventh studio album, Section #11. The tour supporting the album began in December 2019 with two shows at Shibuya Quattro, however, in February, at the tour's midway point, all remaining shows were postponed (and later cancelled) due to the coronavirus pandemic.

In response to the cancellation, the band produced their first ever online broadcast Don't Stop Rollin’ which was beamed live from Shinjuku Red Cloth to an online audience of several thousand fans. The band followed this up with Rock, Re-unite and Roll! in October at Nakano Sunplaza. The show was their first in front of an in-person audience since February and was also broadcast live. In November, the band toured outside of Tokyo alongside comedy duo Jaru Jaru on the Laugh n’ Roll Party tour.

January 2021 saw the release of single ‘Oh No’. Owing to continuing constraints due to the coronavirus pandemic, the accompanying film clip was shot by the band themselves (with directorial input from Kusano) using second-hand VHS video recorders and features DIY recreations of beloved 80s and 90s films. In April, the band undertook the Flashback ’09 & ’10 concept tour, which was a retrospective of the band's albums of that era and featured a setlist derived from fan voting.

The Bawdies’ eighth studio album Blast Off! was released in September 2021 and was followed by the band's first national tour since the cancellation of the Section #11 tour. Whilst strict preventative measures were in place, the band were able to perform 27 shows nationally.

== Freaks in the Garage, Popcorn 2022 - 2024 ==
Blast Off! was quickly followed by the EP Freaks in the Garage, which was released in April 2022. The EP included three original tracks as well as a cover of Mickey Hawks' ‘Bip Bop Boom’ and saw the band digging deeper into their garage punk roots. Notably, the EP saw the band eschew the use of click tracks as they felt that it undermined the underlying precepts of garage punk. The band continued this stance on their subsequent release. In October the band released the double A-side single ‘Get Out Of My Way' / 'Lies’ which continued in the garage punk vein of Freaks in the Garage. The release was followed by the Birth of the Rebels tour. The four-date sojourn, held in November, celebrated Marcy and Taxman's respective birthdays, and featured setlists devised by the two.

With coronavirus restrictions lifting, 2023 was a particularly busy year for The Bawdies and notably, aside from the three-date Happy New Year Acoustic Session 2023 saw them touring exclusively with other bands. In April, the Let's Be Friends! Tour saw the band invite five bands they admired (Chai, Tendouji, キュウソネコカミ (Kyuso Nekokami), 夜の本気ダンス (Your No Honki Dansu) and ドミコ(Domico), to play co-headlining shows. This was followed by a co-headlining tour in June/July that year alongside Okamoto's. The tour was accompanied by the singles ‘Gimme Gimme’ from The Bawdies, which featured Okamoto Sho on guest vocals and ‘Rock n’ Roll Star’ from Okamoto's, which featured Roy on guest vocals. The Bawdies rounded out their touring year with another tour alongside Jaru Jaru in September.

In 2024, the band celebrated their 20th anniversary of formation and 15th anniversary since their major label debut. To mark the occasion they band played shows at Billboard Live venues in Tokyo and Osaka as part of their 20th Birthday Bash, the shows featured guest players Jo Nagaike from Scoobie Do, 別所和洋 from パジャマで海なんかいかない as well as Naoki from Love Psychedelico. Remi Matsuo of Glim Spanky also joined the band on stage to perform the single ‘Scream’, which had been released that same month. The band's ninth studio album Popcorn was released in April and continued the band's exploration of garage punk while also introducing further pop elements. This was followed by the Popcorn Tour 2024, which was their first national tour since all restrictions on singing at live venues were lifted. At the conclusion of the tour in July, the band announced the release of their first vinyl collection. The four-album set features tracks from the band's discography selected by each band member as well as by fan voting. Further included in the collection is a photo book detailing the band's suits since formation. The special edition also includes a custom record player. The collection's release was celebrated on the Never Ending Story shows held in October and November in Osaka and Tokyo.

In September the band showcased their style evolution with the This is my Story exhibition held at Shin-Daita Fever in September. The exhibit featured displays of all of the band's suits as well as live photos spanning the band's 20-year history. Moreover, the band were in attendance on several occasions during the event's run for meet and greet sessions.

In October, The Bawdies announced their third Australian tour, which took place in December and saw the band playing shows in Sydney, Melbourne and Torquay.

== Hot Dog Records 2025 - Present ==
On March 25, 2025, The Bawdies announced their split from Seez Records and the formation of their own company, Hot Dog Records. To mark this new era, the band released their first single on the new label, ‘Sunny Side Up’, and accompanied this with a nine-date national tour. Following this, the band embarked on the Black Leather Invasion tour. The tour took place in small venues in Osaka, Nagoya and Enoshima during August and saw the band eschew their usual suits in favour of black leather jackets from Lewis Leathers. In September, the band played a special one-off show with Glim Spanky, 夏のテーラード, (Eng: Summer Tailored). The show comprised one set of The Bawdies acting as backing band for Glim Spanky as well as a set of their own tunes. The New Kicks tour followed in November, with the band playing four dates, two of which coincided with the birthdays of Marcy and Taxman. During this tour, it was announced that The Bawdies will again play Billboard in Tokyo and Osaka on the Rocking this Joint Tonight tour, set to begin in January 2026.

== Visual style and notable collaborations ==
The Bawdies wear suits tailor made by Anglasad in Tokyo and change these roughly coinciding with each release. While initially band member's suits were differentiated by signature colours (Roy - red, Marcy - black, Jim – blue / purple, Taxman – green / gold), the band have appeared in matching suits since 2013, with signature colours only seen on details such as buttons and lining.

The Bawdies have worked extensively with director Shogo Kusano on several of their music videos since 2014. Collaborations include ‘Come On’, ‘Nice and Slow’, ‘No Way’, ‘The Edge’, ‘New Lights’,'Feelin' Free', 'Happy Rays', ‘Skippin’ Stones’, ‘Stars’, ‘Oh No’ and ‘T.Y.I.A’. Kusano also directed the short film NEW, starring the band, which accompanied the album of the same name.

== Members ==
- Roy (Ryo Watanabe) - Lead vocals, bass guitar
- Taxman (Taku Funayama) - Guitar, backing vocals
- Jim (Yoshihiko Kimura) - Guitar, backing vocals
- Marcy (Masahiko Yamaguchi) - Drums

== Discography ==
	Release date (Japan)	Title	Serial Number	Chart	Notes
	Release date (Japan)	Title	Serial Number	Oricon	Notes
SEEZ RECORDS
-	March 15, 2006	YESTERDAY AND TODAY	SEZ-3002 (CD)	-	-
-	February 6, 2008	Awaking of Rhythm And Blues	SEZ-3007 (CD)	146	-
-	February 6, 2008	Awaking of Rhythm And Blues	SEZ-3008 (LP)	-	-
Getting Better (Victor Entertainment)
1st	April 22, 2009	THIS IS MY STORY	VICL-63294 (CD)	30	October 28, 2015 CD Reissue (VICL-64445)
1st	April 22, 2009	THIS IS MY STORY	SEZ-3013 (LP)	-	October 28, 2015 CD Reissue (VICL-64445)
2nd	April 21, 2010	THERE'S NO TURNING BACK	VICL-63558 (CD)	6	October 28, 2015 CD Reissue (VICL-64446)
2nd	April 21, 2010	THERE'S NO TURNING BACK	SEZ-3016 (LP)	-	October 28, 2015 CD Reissue (VICL-64446)
3rd	June 8, 2011	LIVE THE LIFE I LOVE	VICL-63746 (CD)	6	October 28, 2015 CD Reissue (VICL-64447)
3rd	June 8, 2011	LIVE THE LIFE I LOVE	SEZ-3019 (LP)	224	October 28, 2015 CD Reissue (VICL-64447)
4th	January 16, 2013	1-2-3	VICL-63991 (CD)	2	October 28, 2015 CD Reissue (VICL-64448)
4th	January 16, 2013	1-2-3	VIZL-516 (CD+DVD)	2	October 28, 2015 CD Reissue (VICL-64448)
4th	January 16, 2013	1-2-3	SEZ-3025 (LP)	207	October 28, 2015 CD Reissue (VICL-64448)
Cover Album	March 5, 2014	GOING BACK HOME	VICL-64118 (CD)	13	-
Cover Album	March 5, 2014	GOING BACK HOME	VIZL-645 (CD+DVD)	13	-
Cover Album	March 5, 2014	GOING BACK HOME	SEZ-3029 (LP)	229	-
5th	December 3, 2014	Boys!	VICL-64264 (CD)	13	-
5th	December 3, 2014	Boys!	VIZL-748 (2CD+DVD)	13	-
5th	January 21, 2015	Boys!	SEZ-3033 (LP)	218	-
Live	June 24, 2015	「Boys!」TOUR 2014-2015 -FINAL- at 日本武道館	VICL-64364/5 (2CD)	81	-
6th	February 8, 2017	NEW	VICL-64705 (CD)	10	-
6th	February 8, 2017	NEW	VIZL-1096 (2CD+DVD)	10	-
6th	February 8, 2017	NEW	VIJL-60180 (LP)	10	-
Live	April 18, 2019	Thank you for our Rock and Roll Tour 2004-2019 FINAL at 日本武道館 (Nippon Budokan)	VICL-65180〜1(2CD)		Limited Edition
Best of	May 29, 2019	THIS IS THE BEST	VICL-64970〜1 (CD)		-
Best of	May 29, 2019	THIS IS THE BEST	VIZL-1343 (2CD+DVD)		-
Best of	May 29, 2019	THIS IS THE BEST	-		-
7th	November 27, 2019	Section #11	VICL-65264 (CD)		-
7th	November 27, 2019	Section #11	VIZL-1665 (CD+DVD)		-
7th	November 27, 2019	Section #11	VIJL-60211 (LP)		-
8th	September 22, 2021	BLAST OFF!	VIZL-1939 (CD+DVD)		
8th	September 22, 2021	BLAST OFF!	VICL-65560 (CD)		
8th	November 3, 2021	BLAST OFF!	BAWDU002 (LP)		
EP	April 22, 2022	FREAKS IN THE GARAGE	VCL-2059 (CD)		
9th	April 22, 2024	POPCORN	VICL-65950（CD）		

=== Singles ===
Title	Year	Peak chart positions			Certifications	Album
Title	Year	Oricon Singles Chart	RIAJ Digital Track Chart	Billboard Japan Hot 100	Certifications	Album
"I Beg You"	2007	147	–	–		Awaking of Rhythm and Blues
"It's Too Late"	2009	21	–	4		There's No Turning Back
"Hot Dog"	2010	21	–	3		There's No Turning Back
"Just Be Cool"	2010	97	–	5		Live the Life I Love
"Love You Need You" (featuring Ai)	2011	3	–	3		Live the Life I Love
"Red Rocket Ship"	2011	12	–	8		1-2-3
"Rock Me Baby"	2012	6	10	6		1-2-3
"Lemonade"	2012	6	–	3		1-2-3
"The Seven Seas"	2013	-	-	5		-

=== Vinyl releases ===
- "I Beg You" (2007)
- Awaking of Rhythm and Blues (2008)
- "Emotion Potion" (2009)
- This Is My Story (2009)
- "It's Too Late" (2009)
- "Hot Dog / The Whip" – The Bawdies and Locksley (2010)
- There's No Turning Back (2010)
- "Keep You Happy / Sweet & Still" – The Bawdies and Riddim Saunter (2010)
- "Just Be Cool" (2010)
- "Love You Need You" featuring Ai (2011)
- Live the Life I Love (2011)
- "Red Rocket Ship" (2011)
- "Rock Me Baby" (2012)
- "Lemonade" (2012)
- 1-2-3 (2013)
- "The Seven Seas" (2013)
- Going Back Home (2014)
- "Nice and Slow" / "Come On" (2014)
- Boys! (2015)
- "Shake a Tail Feather" / "Soul Man" (2015)
- "No Way" / "Kicks" (2015)
- "Sunshine" (2015)
- Rockin' Zombies (2016)
- "The Edge" (2016)
- New (2017)
- "Happy Rays" (2018)
- Section #11 (2019)
- "Skippin' Stones" / "Let's Go Back" (2020)
- Blast Off! (2021)
- Freaks in the Garage (2022)
- "Gimme Gimme" / "Rock n' Roll Star" (2023)
- Popcorn (2024)
- 20th & 15th Anniversary Vinyl Collections (2024)
- 'Sunny Side Up'/ 'Forks' (2025)

=== DVD Releases ===
- Live at AX20101011 (2010)
- Keep On Movie (2011)
- Live at Budokan 20111127 (2012)
- Space Shower TV Presents The Bawdies a Go-Go!! 2010 (2012)
- 1-2-3 Tour Final at Osaka-jo Hall (2013)
- The Bawdies A-Go-Go 2011-2013 (2014)
- This is my History (2015)
- [Boys!] Tour 2014-2015 - Final at Nippon Budokan (2015)
- Thank You For Our Rock and Roll 2004-2019 Final at Nippon Budokan (2019)
