= Glim Spanky =

Japanese rock band

- Origin: Nagano Prefecture, Japan
- Genres: Psychedelic rock; garage rock; blues rock
- Years active: 2007–present
- Labels: Theater / Space Shower Music; Virgin / Universal Music Japan
- Members: Remi Matsuo; Hiroki Kamemoto
- Past members: Kazuya Ozawa; Taku Mishima
- Website: glimspanky.com

Glim Spanky (Japanese: グリムスパンキー, Hepburn: Gurimu Supankī) is a Japanese rock band from Nagano Prefecture, consisting of vocalist and rhythm guitarist Remi Matsuo and lead guitarist Hiroki Kamemoto. Originally formed by Matsuo as a quartet for a high school festival in 2007, the group became a duo when they moved to Tokyo to pursue music professionally in February 2010. Glim Spanky signed to Virgin Music in 2014, and released their first full-length album, Sunrise Journey, the following year. They have since released seven studio albums, with 2017's Bizarre Carnival being their highest-charting to date.

Their retro sound, reminiscent of 1960s and 1970s rock bands, has received praise from musicians such as Keisuke Kuwata, Motoharu Sano, and Maki Nomiya. In addition to releasing material as Glim Spanky, Matsuo and Kamemoto frequently collaborate with and write songs for other artists.

== History ==
=== Early years and debut (2007–2015) ===
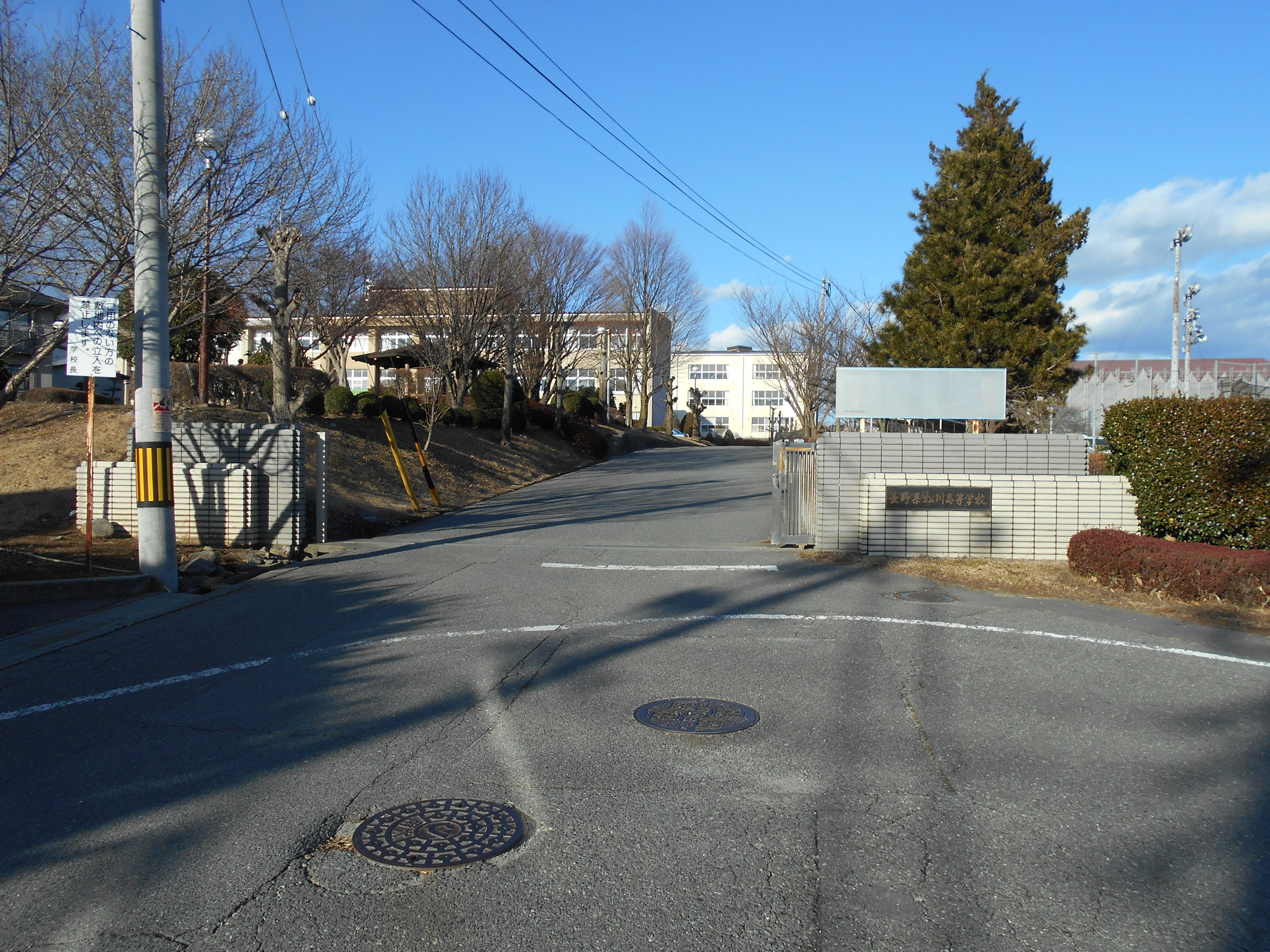
Glim Spanky was formed at Matsukawa High School.

Glim Spanky was formed in Nagano Prefecture by vocalist and guitarist Remi Matsuo during her first year of high school to perform a cover of Bump of Chicken's "Arue" at Matsukawa High School's 2007 cultural festival. With the exception of the drummer, each member was a beginner musician. The band's name comes from Matsuo's interest in Celtic culture and fantasy literature; she read a book describing a goblin's "glim" and added "spank" to describe their aggressive drive towards the music industry. The bassist and other guitarist quit after the festival, but Matsuo wanted to play another live in a week and recruited an upperclassman to play bass as a three-piece. Eventually, the bassist assumed it was difficult for Matsuo to play all of the guitar by herself and recruited another guitarist into the band without her permission; Hiroki Kamemoto, another upperclassman, worked at the same part-time job as the bassist and joined the band. They then began writing their own material and started focusing on the band full time. On days off from school, they would practice from 8:00 in the morning, until 1:00 am at night. Glim Spanky won the Rock Banchō held by Sony Music in December 2008 and were finalists at the 2009 teenage artists-only festival Senko Riot held by Sony, Tokyo FM and au. They made their recording debut by contributing "Shōsō" to the Senko Riot 2009 omnibus.

By 2009, Kamemoto was attending Aichi Gakuin University in Nagoya, but traveled back to Nagano once a week for band activities. When their bassist and drummer quit in February 2010, Matsuo decided to enroll in Nihon University's art department and Kamemoto transferred to the closer Dokkyo University so they could continue the band in Tokyo. The duo resumed activities in April 2010. They initially resisted recruiting support members, performing in an acoustic arrangement of just the two of them. After opening for Fozztone, the president of that band's agency saw a live video of Glim Spanky and asked to meet them. Matsuo and Kamemoto subsequently signed to Amnis Inc. Glim Spanky had their first release in December 2013 when Space Shower Music released the mini-album Music Freak nationwide. They went on their Freak on the Hill tour in March 2014. Matsuo stated that their first four years playing live houses in Tokyo as a duo were difficult, but because they were particular about their sound, stage presence, costumes and artwork, she was confident that the music industry would not leave behind a band with such a complete package. They had received offers from various offices, but waited until they found the right one.

In June 2014 the band released their second mini-album and their major label debut, Shōsō, via EMI R (later renamed Virgin Music). Produced by Junji Ishiwatari, it includes covers of "Rolling in the Deep" by Adele and "Hikō-ki Gumo" by Yumi Arai. Ishiwatari worked with the duo from the songwriting stage, and Matsuo said Ishiwatari helped dispel her prejudice towards major record labels; he never rejected the band's ideas outright, and would spend hours talking about lyrics with her. They supported the mini-album with the Hello! Freaks Tour, which ended with the group's first one-man live at Chelsea Hotel on August 7. After Matsuo provided vocals to a cover of Janis Joplin's "Move Over" for a Suzuki commercial, Glim Spanky recorded their own version and released it as a 7-inch vinyl record limited to 300 copies on November 28. That year, Matsuo contributed guest vocals to the song "Nightfever" by Analogfish.

Kamemoto would later cite 2015 as the turning point in the band's popularity, thanks to "Move Over" and their first single, "Homero yo". Used as the theme song of the TV show Taiko Mochi no Tatsujin ~Tadashii no Home-kata~, "Homero yo" was released in February 2015. The band then released a limited vinyl single for their song "Otona ni Nattara" in May 2015, which was used as the theme song of the film Children of Iron. In July 2015, they released their next single, "Real Onigokko", written as the theme song for the movie of the same name, and performed at that year's Fuji Rock Festival on the Red Marquee stage. Their first full-length album Sunrise Journey was produced by Ishiwatari and Seiji Kameda, and released in July 2015. It also includes "Wonder Alone", the ending theme of the Himitsu Kessha Taka no Tsume DO anime, for which Matsuo and Kamemoto voiced characters based on themselves. Glim Spanky performed a sold-out one-man concert at Akasaka Blitz on October 17, and they were one of the recipients of that year's Miura Jun Award and nominated for Next Break Artist at the 2015 MTV Video Music Awards Japan.

=== Bizarre Carnival and Looking for the Magic (2016–2019) ===
After their third mini-album Wild Side wo Ike in January 2016, Glim Spanky contributed a cover of "Sgt. Pepper's Lonely Hearts Club Band" for Hello Goodbye, a tribute album to The Beatles. Their second album Next One followed on July 20 and its tour began in September. "Ikari o Kure yo" was used as the theme song for One Piece Film: Gold, "Hanashi o Shiyō" is the second ending theme of Kyōkai no Rinne, while "Yami ni me o Koraseba" is the theme song of the film Shōjo. I Stand Alone, their fourth mini-album, was released on April 12, 2017. Their third album Bizarre Carnival was released on September 13, 2017, and the band embarked on its tour in October. They played their first overseas concert in Shanghai on December 16 and another in Taiwan on January 20, 2018. Bizarre Carnival was nominated for the 2018 CD Shop Awards.

The duo's third single, "Orokamono-tachi", was released on January 31 and is the theme song of the Funōhan live-action film adaptation. It includes a cover of Carole King's "I Feel the Earth Move". They also wrote the song "The Flowers" for the Isetan Mitsukoshi Holdings film 2018 Hanabanasai Wild Flowers ~Hana o Aisuru Hitobito. In a collaboration for the project, the band performed a concert on top of a building in Shinjuku on February 25 which was broadcast live. "The Flowers" is included as a b-side on their fourth single "All of Us", released on May 9. If ordered on certain websites, the single includes their cover of The Brilliant Green's "There Will Be Love There (Ai no Aru Basho)" from the February 17, 2018 episode of the BS-TBS TV show Sound Inn "S". Glim Spanky performed at the Nippon Budokan for the first time on May 12. They also performed at Makuhari Messe on June 23 as part of Luna Sea's Lunatic Fest. 2018, where they were joined onstage by Sugizo for "Orokamono-tachi", and on June 30 as part of SiM's Dead Pop Festival 2018. The band returned to Fuji Rock Festival on July 27, this time playing the main stage, and played the Rock in Japan Festival on August 12.

Glim Spanky were nominated for Best Japan Act at the 2018 MTV Europe Music Awards. They released their fourth album Looking for the Magic on November 21 and began its tour in March 2019, which continued into June and included shows in Taiwan and Hong Kong. The song "TV Show" was recorded in Los Angeles and features Jack White support members Jack Lawrence and Carla Azar on bass and drums respectively. Glim Spanky collaborated with Sugizo again to cover Daisuke Inoue's "Meguriai" as the first ending theme of Mobile Suit Gundam: The Origin – Advent of the Red Comet. The duo also provided Momoiro Clover Z with the song "Lady May", which they both composed the music for, while Matsuo wrote the lyrics and Kamemoto arranged it and contributed guitar. Glim Spanky returned yet again to Fuji Rock Festival where they performed twice; once on July 26 as part of Route 17 Rock'n'Roll Orchestra, a session band also including Yūzō Kayama, Reichi Nakaido, Liam Ó Maonlaí and Shō Okamoto (Okamoto's), and then an acoustic set on 27. They also performed at Rock in Japan Festival on August 11 and the Rising Sun Rock Festival on August 17.

=== Continued collaborations and 10th anniversary (2019–present) ===
Glim Spanky contributed the track "Circle of Time" to October 2019's New Gene, Inspired from Phoenix, a compilation album featuring songs inspired by Osamu Tezuka's manga series Phoenix. The band's fifth single "Story no Saki ni", which was written to be the theme song of the TV show Re:Follower, was released on November 20, 2019. Its music video features the deepfake technique, using the faces of six other women, to express multiple personality disorder on its lead actress. Glim Spanky wrote the song "From the Seeds" for Mone Kamishiraishi to sing as the opening theme for the March 2020 second season of the 7 Seeds anime. Both members composed the music, Matsuo wrote the lyrics and participated in the chorus, and Kamemoto arranged the song and provided guitar. On June 24, 2020, the band released the song "Konna Yofuke wa" digitally after writing and recording it remotely due to the COVID-19 pandemic in Japan. In October, they released their fifth album Walking on Fire and were recipients of the Shinmai Senshō award as natives of Nagano Prefecture who made important contributions to society. Glim Spanky live streamed a concert on November 14. The duo collaborated with Tomoyasu Hotei for the song "Savage Sun" on his November 2020 album Soul to Soul, and wrote "Mikansei na Drama" for DISH; both members composed the music, while Matsuo wrote the lyrics, and Kamemoto arranged the song and provided guitar. Kamemoto also provided guitar to the theme songs of the 2020 anime film Earwig and the Witch. For the film's 2022 album Āya to Majo Songbook 13 Lime Avenue, which is credited to the fictional band "Earwig", Kamemoto played on every track and Glim Spanky contributed the songs "The House in Lime Avenue" and "A Black Cat".

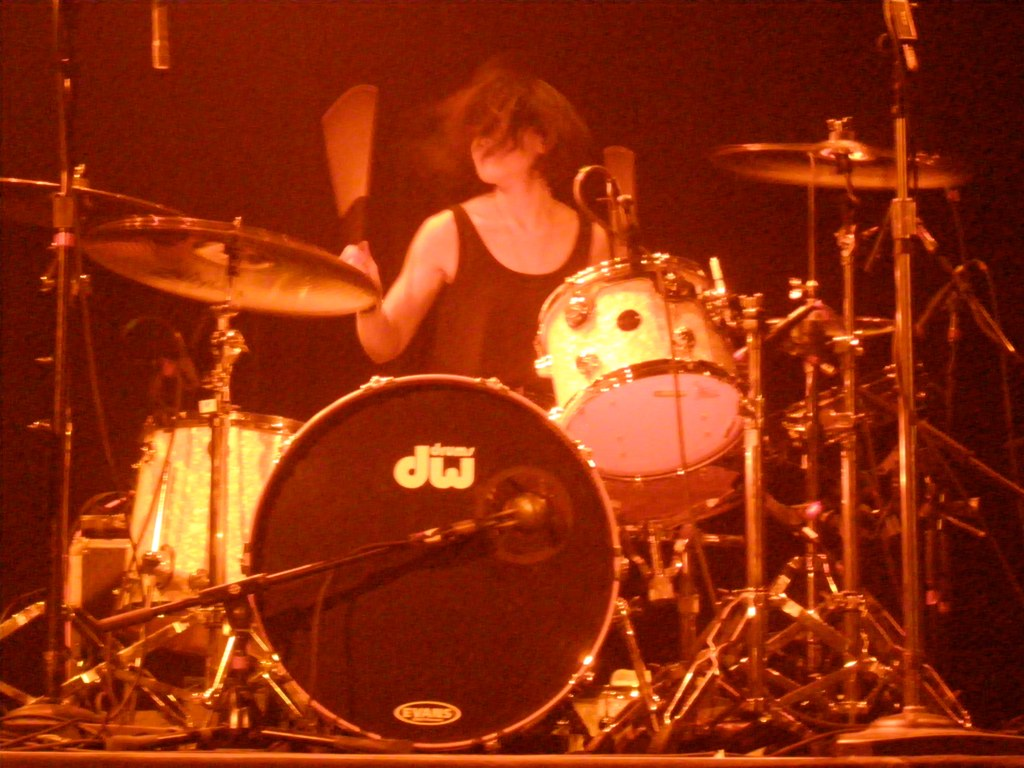
Drummer Yoko Fukuda has supported Glim Spanky on multiple occasions, both live and in the studio.

Glim Spanky's song "Kaze wa Yonde Iru" was selected to be the official theme of Asahi Broadcasting Nagano's 30th anniversary, and was later released digitally in June 2021 with their own version of "Mikansei na Drama". They worked with Kamishiraishi again on covers of "Aozora" by The Blue Hearts and "Ikareta Baby" by Fishmans for her June album Ano Uta −2-. The duo covered "Slow na Boogie ni Shite Kure (I Want You)" for July's Takashi Matsumoto tribute album Take Me to Kazemachi!. In September 2021, they digitally released a cover of UA's 1996 song "Jounetsu". Glim Spanky wrote the song "Kagami yo Kagami" for virtual singer KAF, while Matsuo wrote and produced the song "Candy Moon" for Maki Nomiya. The band's sixth studio album, Into the Time Hole, was released on August 3, 2022. It was supported by an 11-date nationwide tour from November 2 to December 21. Glim Spanky's "Fukō Are" (lyrics co-written by Junji Ishiwatari) is the theme song of the Sawako ~ Soreha, Hatenaki Fukushū TV drama, while their song "Last Scene" is the theme of the Paravi show Koi no Last Vacation. Both songs are included on the band's seventh studio album, The Goldmine, which was released on November 15, 2023. The album was supported by their first large-scale tour since 2019, which took them to 23 locations nationwide. The duo also contributed a version of "Manatsu no Yoru no Yume" to Yumi Matsutoya's 2023 album Yuming Kanpai!!, which features new versions of the singer's songs created by artists, chosen by Matsutoya herself, adding their own performances to her original recordings.

2024 marked the 10th anniversary of Glim Spanky's major label debut and they commemorated the occasion with a four-date anniversary tour from August 7 to 30. The first concert took place at Chelsea Hotel, which is where the band held their first solo live exactly 10 years earlier, and was for fan club members only. They performed a special anniversary concert with the Sendai Philharmonic Quartet at the Kotodai Park Open-Air Concert Hall on November 9. Their first best-of compilation album, All the Greatest Dudes, was released on November 27 and features a tracklist that took into consideration fan votes, but also includes new songs. New tracks include "Himitsu o Kimi ni", their second collaboration with KAF, "Akai Wadachi", which was an ending theme of the live-action Golden Kamuy -Hokkaidō Irezumi Shūjin Sōdatsu-hen- TV series, and "Ai ga Michiru Made", a collaboration with Love Psychedelico. Glim Spanky spent most of 2025 performing live, including their All the Greatest Dudes tour from February 28 to its "Extra Show" on March 23, and its Another One leg, which was held from June 27 to July 18. They appeared at many festivals, including Arabaki Rock Fest.25 on April 26, Hibiya Music Festival on June 1, Hyakumangoku Ongakusai on June 7, 04 Limited Sazabys' Yon Fes on June 21, Oborock on September 14, and Nakatsugawa Wild Wood on September 21. Several dates in October and November had to be cancelled due to Matsuo falling ill. At the end of the year, the band released "Camera Irony" as the theme song of the drama Scoop no Tamago. From December 2 to January 17, 2026, they held the short All the Greatest Buddies Tour, where each date featured another act, either Sunny Day Service, The Dresscodes, Okamoto's, or Love Psychedelico.

Glim Spanky contributed a cover of "Hikō-ki Gumo", which was used in The Wind Rises, to the February 2026 Studio Ghibli tribute album Ghibli wo Utau Sono 2. They previously recorded an acoustic version of the song for their 2014 mini-album Shōsō. Glim Spanky performed two joint concerts with A Flood of Circle on February 28 and March 7, and wrote the song "Sweet Magic" for Lisa. The band then released their eighth studio album, Éclore, on March 25 and supported it with a 16-date tour from June 14 to August 27. Glim Spanky wrote the song "Kuraiai" for Yukari Amane to sing for the The Idolmaster franchise, and provided Kamishiraishi with the song "Trophy" for her September 2026 album Bouquet. They also covered "Blood Red Shoes" for the November 2026 A Flood of Circle tribute album Heartmark Shishū Shite Yaru yo, Chotto Wasureppoi Tamashī ni.

== Music and influences ==
"Shōsō"
Sample of "Shōsō", from their 2014 major label debut, a song Matsuo wrote when she was seventeen years old.

Glim Spanky's music is largely influenced by Western rock and blues bands from the 1960s and 1970s. The duo are also influenced by the fashion from those two decades and usually wear retro-looking clothing. They have also included liquid light shows, which were popularized in the 1960s, at their concerts. Matsuo is the principal songwriter of the band's lyrics and music, but when she only has a guitar riff, chord progression or drum phrase before working with Kamemoto to turn it into a song, then both get credited for the music as Glim Spanky. Her husky vocals have been likened to those of Janis Joplin.

Due to her unique voice, Matsuo struggled with singing in primary school and junior high. But after noticing that John Lennon's voice had a rough quality to it in songs such as "Help!", she realized that her voice would suit rock music well. She cited The Beatles, The Who, Led Zeppelin, Jimi Hendrix and Joni Mitchell as influences. Matsuo grew up in an artistic family and was exposed to a wide range of music and cultures by meeting musicians and poets. In addition to the ubiquitous Western bands, she also heard French music, African rock, Shibuya-kei and folk. Kamemoto started playing guitar because of Glay, then moved on to Nirvana, Guns N' Roses, Oasis, Jimi Hendrix and Cream. The duo are also fans of Japanese bands such as Bump of Chicken, Asian Kung-Fu Generation and Ellegarden which they grew up listening to. Both members cited The Beatles as their biggest influence.

Talking about their second album Next One in 2016, Matsuo said that it is "absurd" to try and put Japanese lyrics in Western-style rock music. "But even so, you have to, so although Japanese lyrics are included on top of the melody, if you were to remove them you would have a completely Western-style melody, so we made the album that that in mind." In regards to what the band wanted to do next, she said that because rock music is imported from the West, she pondered what type of rock people in the West can not make, and came up with "orientalness." Western artists became influenced by Indian music and created psychedelic rock, but "Luckily for us, we already have that orientalness the moment we are born. We can put out there something people in the West cannot, so we are establishing ourselves a Japanese kind of rock that will echo throughout the world[...] A genuine oriental psychedelic rock band."

Speaking of their 2017 album Bizarre Carnival, the singer described their first and second albums as "business cards to introduce ourselves. Up until now, we've held off on the kind of maniacal rock music we really like." 2018's Looking for the Magic begins with distorted vocals as Matsuo wanted the listener to be unable to tell where the singer was from in order "to create a utopia-like song that gradually enthralls listeners." The band found recording in Los Angeles quite different than in Japan, where its done in completely soundproof rooms with expensive cables. For "TV Show" they purposely left the white noise in to give it a raw feel. Matsuo referred to the song as a wake up call against people believing fake news on the internet; "Now that's scary. I wanted to say [in this song] that people should think for themselves about what is true, without just being fed information." She further stated "I've always included hope into even my most judgmental songs, because I believe rock music is about hope."

== Members ==
Current members

- Remi Matsuo (松尾レミ) – vocals, rhythm guitar (2007–present)
- Hiroki Kamemoto (亀本寛貴) – lead guitar, synthesizer, programming, backing vocals (2007–present)

Former members

- Kazuya Ozawa (尾澤和也) – bass (2007–2010)
- Taku Mishima (三島拓) – drums (2007–2010)

Support members

- Ohki Kurihara (栗原大) – bass
- Toshiaki "J.J." Takenami (武並"J.J."俊明) – drums
- Shuntaro Kado (かどしゅんたろう) – drums
- Yoko Fukuda (福田洋子) – drums
- Yota "Gomes" Nakagome (中込"ゴメス"陽大) – keyboards, backing vocals
- Yusuke Kurita (栗田祐輔) – keyboards, backing vocals
- Ryo Sugimoto (杉本亮) – keyboards
- Kazuya Takenouchi (竹之内一彌) – guitar

== Discography ==
=== Studio albums ===
Title	Album details	Peak chart positions		
Title	Album details	JPN Oricon	JPN Billboard Hot	JPN Billboard Top
Sunrise Journey	Released: July 22, 2015; Label: Virgin / Universal Music Japan	39	32	31
Next One	Released: July 20, 2016; Label: Virgin / Universal Music Japan	9	9	8
Bizarre Carnival	Released: September 13, 2017; Label: Virgin / Universal Music Japan	7	7	5
Looking for the Magic	Released: November 21, 2018; Label: Virgin / Universal Music Japan	10	12	9
Walking on Fire	Released: October 7, 2020; Label: Virgin / Universal Music Japan	18	13	15
Into the Time Hole	Released: August 3, 2022; Label: Virgin / Universal Music Japan	13	14	12
The Goldmine	Released: November 15, 2023; Label: Virgin / Universal Music Japan	17	13	12
Éclore	Released: March 25, 2026; Label: Virgin / Universal Music Japan	15	—	17
"—" denotes a recording that did not chart.

=== Mini-albums ===
Title	Mini-album details	Peak chart positions		
Title	Mini-album details	JPN Oricon	JPN Billboard Hot	JPN Billboard Top
Music Freak	Released: December 4, 2013; Label: Theater / Space Shower Music	—	—	—
Shōsō (焦燥)	Released: June 11, 2014; Label: EMI R / Universal Music Japan	171	—	—
Wild Side wo Ike (ワイルド・サイドを行け)	Released:January 27, 2016; Label: Virgin / Universal Music Japan	31	45	26
I Stand Alone	Released: April 12, 2017; Label: Virgin / Universal Music Japan	10	12	9
"—" denotes a recording released before the creation of the Hot Albums chart, or that did not chart.

=== Singles ===
Title	Single details	Peak chart positions		
Title	Single details	JPN Oricon	JPN Billboard Hot 100	JPN Billboard Top
"Homero yo" (褒めろよ)	Released: February 18, 2015	83	20	76
"Real Onigokko" (リアル鬼ごっこ)	Released: July 1, 2015	145	84	—
"Orokamono-tachi" (愚か者たち)	Released: January 31, 2018	31	25	31
"All of Us"	Released: May 9, 2018	22	50	23
"Story no Saki ni" (ストーリーの先に)	Released: November 20, 2019	28	—	32
"—" denotes a recording that did not chart.

=== Compilation albums ===
Title	Album details	Peak chart positions		
Title	Album details	JPN Oricon	JPN Billboard Hot	JPN Billboard Top
All the Greatest Dudes	Released: November 27, 2024; Label: Virgin / Universal Music Japan	18	18	17

=== Other releases ===
Year	Release details
2014	"Shōsō" (焦燥) / "Move Over": Released: November 28, 2014; Notes: 7-inch vinyl
2014	"Move Over": Released: December 6, 2014; Notes: Digital
2015	"Otona ni Nattara" (大人になったら): Released: April 22, 2015; Notes: Digital
2015	"Otona ni Nattara" (大人になったら) / "Homero yo" (褒めろよ): Released: May 27, 2015; Notes: 7-inch vinyl
2016	"Hanashi o Shiyō" (話をしよう) / "Jidai no Hero" (時代のヒーロー): Released: May 13, 2016; Notes: Digital
2018	"Heart ga Sameru Mae ni" (ハートが冷める前に): Released: August 1, 2018; Notes: Digital
2019	"Meguriai" (めぐりあい): Released: June 11, 2019; Notes: Digital, credited to Sugizo feat. Glim Spanky
2019	"Tiny Bird": Released: July 7, 2019; Notes: Digital
2020	"Singin' Now": Released: May 13, 2020; Notes: Digital
2020	"Konna Yofuke wa" (こんな夜更けは): Released: June 24, 2020; Notes: Digital
2020	"Tokyo wa Moeteru" (東京は燃えてる): Released: August 19, 2020; Notes: Digital
2021	"Kaze wa Yonde Iru" (風は呼んでいる) / "Mikansei na Drama" (未完成なドラマ): Released: June 16, 2021; Notes: Digital
2021	"Jounetsu" (情熱): Released: September 29, 2021; Notes: Digital
2021	"I'm in a Groovie": Released: November 3, 2021; Notes: Digital, credited to Monjoe feat. Glim Spanky
2022	"Whiskey ga, Osuki Desho" (ウイスキーが、お好きでしょ): Released: April 27, 2022; Notes: Digital
2022	"Katachi Nai Mono" (形ないもの): Released: May 29, 2022; Notes: Digital
2022	"Jounetsu" (情熱) / "Kaze wa Yonde Iru" (風は呼んでいる): Released: August 31, 2022; Notes: 7-inch vinyl
2022	"Fukō Are" (不幸アレ): Released: October 31, 2022; Notes: Digital
2023	"Whiskey ga, Osuki Desho" (ウイスキーが、お好きでしょ) / "Katachi Nai Mono" (形ないもの): Released: February 22, 2023; Notes: 7-inch vinyl
2023	"Last Scene": Released: May 26, 2023; Notes: Digital
2023	"Odd Dancer": Released: June 30, 2023; Notes: Digital
2023	"Ikari o Kure yo (Jon-Yakitory Remix)" (怒りをくれよ (jon-YAKITORY Remix)): Released: October 13, 2023; Notes: Digital
2024	"Fighter": Released: April 27, 2024; Notes: Digital
2024	"Kaze ni Kiss o Shite" (風にキスをして): Released: July 24, 2024; Notes: Digital
2024	"Himitsu o Kimi ni feat. KAF" (ひみつを君に feat. 花譜): Released: September 11, 2024; Notes: Digital
2024	"Akai Wadachi" (赤い轍): Released: October 20, 2024; Notes: Digital
2024	"Ai ga Michiru Made feat. Love Psychedelico" (愛が満ちるまで feat. LOVE PSYCHEDELICO): Released: November 13, 2024; Notes: Digital
2025	"Shōdō" (衝動): Released: May 12, 2025; Notes: Digital
2025	"Camera Irony" (カメラ アイロニー): Released: October 29, 2025; Notes: Digital

=== Compilation appearances ===
Year	Song(s)	Album
2009	"Shōsō" (焦燥)	Senko Riot 2009 (閃光ライオット2009): Released: December 2, 2009
2016	"Sgt. Pepper's Lonely Hearts Club Band"	Hello Goodbye: Released: June 29, 2016
2016	"Ikari o Kure yo (Short Ver.)" (怒りをくれよ (Short ver.))	One Piece Film Gold Original Soundtrack: Released: July 27, 2016
2017	"Beatniks" (ビート二クス)	"Beatniks" (ビート二クス) / "Killing Me Softly": Released: November 8, 2017; Notes: Split 7-inch vinyl coupled with a song by KenKen
2019	"Circle of Time"	New Gene, Inspired from Phoenix: Released: October 30, 2019
2021	"Slow na Boogie ni Shite Kure (I Want You)" (スローなブギにしてくれ(I want you))	Takashi Matsumoto 50th Anniversary Tribute Album: Take Me to Kazemachi!: Released: July 14, 2021
2022	"The House in Lime Avenue", "A Black Cat"	Āya to Majo Songbook: 13 Lime Avenue: Released: January 26, 2022
2023	"Manatsu no Yoru no Yume" (真夏の夜の夢)	Yuming Kanpai!!: Yumi Matsutoya 50th Anniversary Collaboration Best Album: Released: December 20, 2023; Notes: Credited as "Glim Spanky cheers Yumi Matsutoya"
2026	"Hikō-ki Gumo" (ひこうき雲)	Ghibli wo Utau Sono 2: Released: February 25, 2026
2026	"Blood Red Shoes"	Heartmark Shishū Shite Yaru yo, Chotto Wasureppoi Tamashī ni: Released: November 4, 2026

== Awards ==
Year	Award	Category	Nomination	Result
2015	CD Shop Awards	Kōshin'etsu Block Award	Shōsō	Won
2015	2015 MTV Video Music Awards Japan	Next Break Artist	Glim Spanky	Nominated
2015	Miura Jun Awards	Miura Jun Award	Glim Spanky	Won
2017	Space Shower Music Awards	Breakthrough Artist	Glim Spanky	Nominated
2018	CD Shop Awards	Grand Prize	Bizarre Carnival	Nominated
2018	2018 MTV Europe Music Awards	Best Japan Act	Glim Spanky	Nominated
2019	CD Shop Awards	Grand Prize	Looking for the Magic	Nominated
2020	25th Shinmai Senshō	Shinmai Senshō	Glim Spanky	Won
