= Earwig and the Witch =

2020 Japanese animated film

- Theatrical release poster

Japanese name
- Kanji: アーヤと魔女
- Literal meaning: Aya and the Witch
Transcriptions
- Revised Hepburn: Āya to Majo
- Directed by: Gorō Miyazaki
- Screenplay by: Keiko Niwa; Emi Gunji
- Based on: Earwig and the Witch by Diana Wynne Jones
- Produced by: Toshio Suzuki
- Starring: Shinobu Terajima; Etsushi Toyokawa; Gaku Hamada; Kokoro Hirasawa
- Music by: Satoshi Takebe
- Production company: Studio Ghibli
- Distributed by: Toho (theatrical)
- Release dates: October 18, 2020 (Lumière Festival); December 30, 2020 (NHK G); August 27, 2021 (theatrical)
- Running time: 82 minutes
- Country: Japan
- Language: Japanese
- Box office: US$842,744

Earwig and the Witch (Japanese: アーヤと魔女, Hepburn: Āya to Majo; lit. 'Aya and the Witch') is a 2020 Japanese animated fantasy film directed by Gorō Miyazaki and with a screenplay by Keiko Niwa and Emi Gunji. It is based on the novel of the same name by Diana Wynne Jones. The original voice cast includes Shinobu Terajima, Etsushi Toyokawa, Gaku Hamada, and Kokoro Hirasawa.

A co-production between Studio Ghibli, NHK, and NHK Enterprises, Earwig and the Witch had its world premiere on October 18, 2020, at the Lumière Film Festival, before premiering in Japan on television on December 30, 2020, on NHK General TV; it was then released in theatres in Japan by Toho on August 27, 2021. The film received negative reviews from critics and grossed US$842,744 at the worldwide box office.

== Plot ==
In 1990s England, a witch named Scarlett, leaves her child, Earwig, at St. Morwald's Home for Children. The matron head of the home thinks that the name is unfit for a child and changes it to Erica Wigg. Years later, Earwig is a rambunctious 10-year-old who is very comfortable in an orphanage where everyone does what she wants. She likes living there with her friend Custard and does not want to get adopted.

One day, a strange couple, Bella Yaga and Mandrake, adopt Earwig against her wishes. When they get home, Bella Yaga tells Earwig that she is a witch, and that she only adopted Earwig for "an extra pair of hands" to help around the house. Earwig agrees to help, only if Bella Yaga teaches her magic in return. Earwig prepares ingredients for spells and cleans the workroom. Tired of working, she attempts to leave the house, only to find that all the exits have been magically sealed by Mandrake. She becomes further frustrated because Bella Yaga never teaches her any magic.

Earwig begins to listen to tapes from an old band called Earwig and discovers that Bella Yaga's cat familiar Thomas can talk. The two of them enter the workroom at night to create a spell that will make them resistant to magic, becoming immune to Bella Yaga's punishments. They also work on a spell to give Bella Yaga a literal "extra pair of hands" on her body so Earwig would be dismissed from her work.

The spell is a success and Bella Yaga is furious at her extra pair of hands, and casts magical worms that appear in Earwig's room. Because of Earwig's magical resistance, the worms are harmless. Earwig sends the worms through a hole in the wall, which angers Mandrake. In the ensuing chaos, Earwig breaks into Mandrake's room and discovers he and Bella Yaga were members of the band Earwig. Mandrake appears and tells the tale of the band, revealing that their singer was Earwig's mother.

Through her new power, Earwig is able to take over the house and have the others do what she wants. She even manages to invite her friend Custard over for Christmas. When he arrives, Scarlett drops in for a surprise visit.

== Cast ==
Character
Character	Japanese	English
Earwig (Aya)	Kokoro Hirasawa	Taylor Paige Henderson
Bella Yaga	Shinobu Terajima	Vanessa Marshall
The Mandrake	Etsushi Toyokawa	Richard E. Grant
Thomas	Gaku Hamada	Dan Stevens
Scarlett "Earwig's Mother" (Āya's Mother)	Sherina Munaf	Kacey Musgraves
Mr. Jenkins	Yuji Ueda	JB Blanc
Matron		Pandora Colin
Custard		Logan Hannan
Phyllis		Summer Jenkins
Sally		Vivienne Rutherford
Assistant Matron		Alex Cartañá
Cook		Tom Bromhead
Assistant Cook		Eva Kaminsky

== Production ==
Directed by Gorō Miyazaki, the film was announced as the first full 3D CG animated film by Studio Ghibli and was scheduled for a television premiere on NHK in late 2020. On June 19, 2020, images from the film were revealed by Miyazaki. Gorō said that his father told him to go with it and Toshio Suzuki encouraged him, but after that he was left on his own and made the anime with young staff and "didn't consult with the old guys at all." He also said that he is the only one at the studio who knows the method of creating CG animation.

=== Music ===
Satoshi Takebe composed the music for the film. The theme song, "Don't Disturb Me", and ending theme, "Atashi no Sekai Seifuku" (あたしの世界征服; lit. "My World Domination"), are performed by a specially-formed band composed of Sherina Munaf on vocals, Hiroki Kamemoto of Glim Spanky on guitar, Kiyokazu Takano of Mrs. Green Apple on bass, Kavka Shishido on drums, and Takebe on keyboards. The film's original soundtrack album was released on January 6, 2021. The album Earwig and the Witch Songbook: 13 Lime Avenue, which is credited to the film's fictional band "Earwig", was released on January 26, 2022. In addition to the above musicians (sans Takano), the album also features Glim Spanky vocalist Remi Matsuo and Yoasobi support musician Hikaru Yamamoto. Glim Spanky, who contributed two songs to the record, received the offer as Miyazaki is a fan of theirs. Their track "The House in Lime Avenue" was influenced by Irish folk songs and those of England's Nick Drake. For their other contribution, "A Black Cat", Matsuo was conscious of the melodies and gospel harmonies of Aretha Franklin for her vocals, while the rhythm was inspired by that of The Rolling Stones' song "Sympathy for the Devil".

== Release ==
=== World premiere ===
The film was scheduled to premiere at the 2020 Cannes Film Festival before the event was cancelled due to the COVID-19 pandemic. It instead premiered at the Lumière Film Festival in Lyon Metropolis, on October 18, 2020.

=== Japan ===
In November 2020, the cast and crew information, along with its plot details and broadcast date were announced. It aired on NHK General TV on December 30, 2020.

On February 11, 2021, Toho announced that the film was slated to be released theatrically in Japan on April 29, 2021. This version includes some scenes not shown on the TV broadcast version (but already included in releases of the film outside Japan).

On April 23, 2021, the film was removed from the release calendar due to the COVID-19 pandemic. It was later announced that the new release date would be on August 27, 2021.

The film was released on DVD and Blu-ray Disc by Pony Canyon on December 1, 2021, making it the first Studio Ghibli movie since the original VHS release of Whisper of the Heart not to have Walt Disney Japan as home video distributor. However, Walt Disney Japan released the film (under license from Pony Canyon) as part of a box set on the same day which contains the non–Hayao Miyazaki and Isao Takahata Studio Ghibli feature films.

=== United States ===
On July 7, 2020, Studio Ghibli's North American distributor GKIDS announced they had acquired the North American distribution rights to the film and that the film would be set for a theatrical release date of early 2021 in North America.

On January 7, 2021, GKIDS announced that the film would receive a limited theatrical release beginning on February 3, while it would be added to HBO Max on February 5. The film was released digitally on March 23, 2021, and on Blu-ray Disc and DVD on April 6, 2021. The GKIDS release of the film is the same as the Japanese theatrical version.

=== International ===
As with Ghibli's other features, Wild Bunch handles the international sales of the film.

On September 11, 2020, Wild Bunch confirmed they had purchased the distribution rights to Studio Ghibli's films in France from previous distributor Disney, and that they would handle distribution of the film both theatrically and on home media in the country.

On December 3, 2020, it was announced that Elysian Film Group had acquired the British and Irish distribution rights to the film, becoming the company's very first film acquisition after it was founded in February that year. This will make it the first theatrical release of a Ghibli film since Princess Mononoke not to be distributed by StudioCanal UK in the region. Elysian released the film in cinemas on May 28, 2021, on over 100 screens and only dubbed into English, and later released it on DVD and Blu-ray Disc (including the Japanese audio and English subtitles as well as the English dub) on September 27, 2021.

On October 13, 2021, it was announced that Netflix had acquired the worldwide streaming rights to the film, except Japan and United States. It was released on the service on November 18, 2021.

== Reception ==
=== Box office ===
As of October 2021, Earwig and the Witch grossed US$173,704 at the North American box office and US$669,040 from other territories, with a worldwide total of US$842,744. According to Kinema Junpo's March 2022 issue, the film grossed ¥300 million (approximately US$2.2 million) domestically.

=== Critical response ===
The film received negative reviews. (Note: Dazed reported that the film "garnered a slew of negative reviews", while Engadget stated that it got "overwhelmingly negative reaction".) On review aggregator website Rotten Tomatoes, 28% of 68 critic reviews are positive for Earwig and the Witch, and the average rating is 4.9/10. The critics consensus on the website is: "With a story as uninspired as its animation, Earwig and the Witch is a surprising—and near-total—misfire for Studio Ghibli." According to Metacritic, which calculated a weighted average score of 46 out of 100 based on 21 reviews, the film received "mixed or average reviews".

Writing for IndieWire, David Ehrlich gave the film a C− and said, "While Earwig and the Witch is far from the ugliest film of its kind, there's something uniquely perverse about seeing Ghibli's signature aesthetic suffocated inside a plastic coffin and sapped of its brilliant soul; about seeing the studio's lush green worlds replaced by lifeless backdrops, and its hyper-expressive character designs swapped out for cheap dolls so devoid of human emotion that even the little kids look Botoxed with an inch [sic] of their lives. This is the cartoon equivalent of that botched Jesus fresco, only lacking the human touch that gave that debacle some perverse charm of its own."

Vox's Aja Romano gave the film 3 out of 5 stars and said, "There are some moments early on when there are still shots of nature, or slow Ghibli-esque pans across landscapes. But these isolated shots don't connect to a larger overall mood, characterization, or thematic idea. They feel like pale imitations from a director who knows what Ghibli films do, but not why… And even the highly striking animation aesthetic for which Ghibli is renowned feels largely absent, due to the muted, flat palette of the film's CGI… Ultimately, Earwig and the Witch is a far cry from Studio Ghibli at its finest."

== See also ==
- List of films about witchcraft
