= Gibson ES-345 =

Guitar produced by Gibson, 1959 to 1981

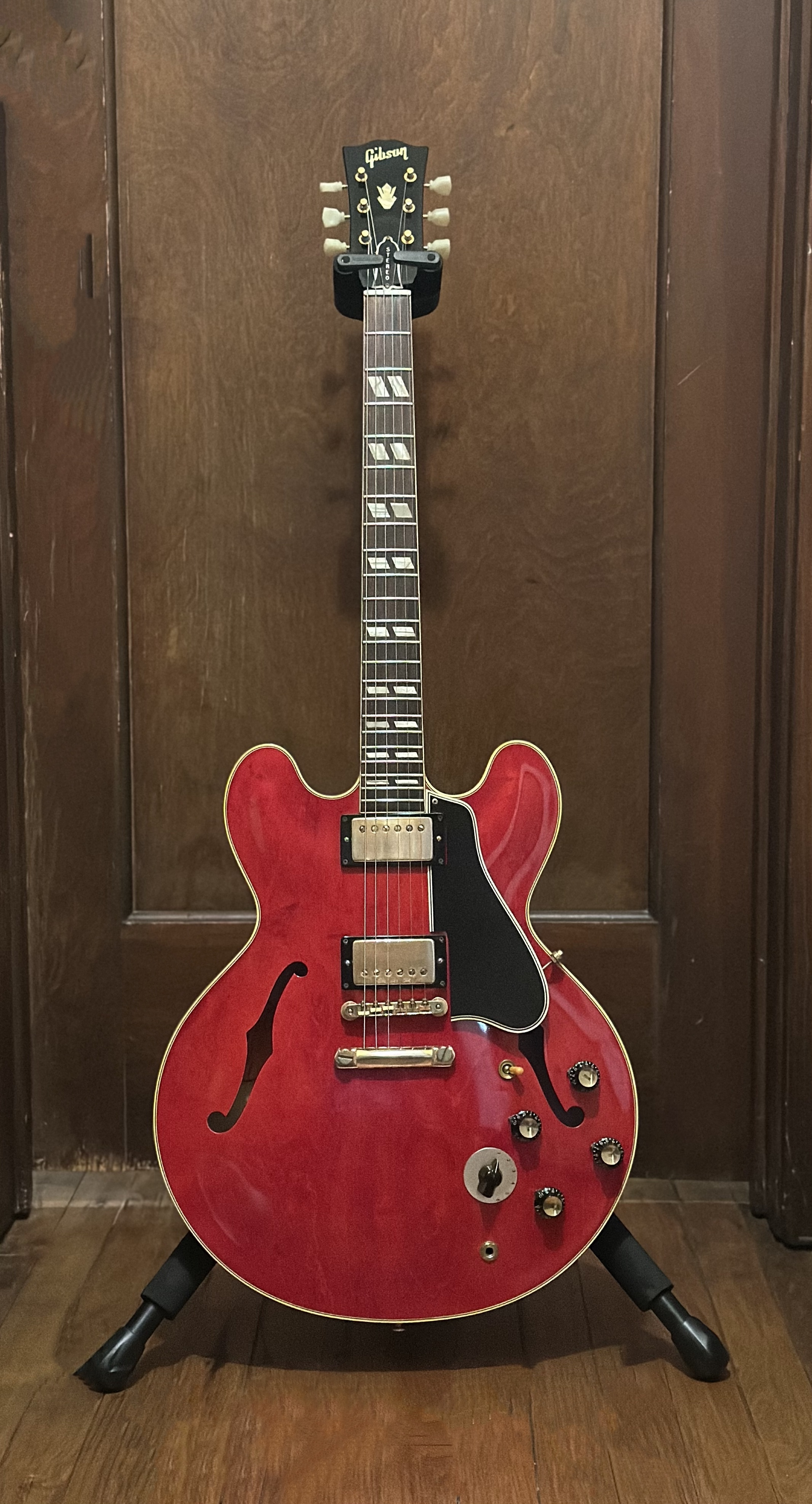
- 1960 Gibson ES-345TDC
- Manufacturer: Gibson Brands
- Period: 1959-present

Construction
- Body type: Thinline semi-hollow body
- Neck joint: Set-neck
- Scale: 24.75"

Woods
- Body: Maple-poplar laminate
- Neck: Mahogany
- Fretboard: Rosewood

Hardware
- Bridge: Tune-o-matic
- Pickup: Humbuckers

Colors available
- Sunburst, Cherry and Natural

The Gibson ES-345 is a guitar manufactured by the Gibson Guitar Company. The guitar has been produced since 1959 to the present day. It was designed as a hybrid between a solid-body electric guitar and a jazz guitar, and was intended as a middleground between the ES-335 and the ES-355.

== History ==
The 345 was developed in 1958 as an upscale version of the Gibson ES-335. Gibson announced the ES-345 as the ES-345T in May 1959. The Gibson ES-345T had a price of $345 in the standard sunburst finish. From the guitar's 1959 introduction through 1979, 10,560 ES-345s were shipped. Gibson designed the guitar to create a guitar which could be used to play jazz, as would be typical of an Electric Spanish guitar, but with a maple block running through the guitar to allow the versatility of a solid body electric guitar.

Gibson produced the guitar in three finishes, Cherry, Natural and Sunburst, with each finish reflected in its model name — the cheapest, Sunburst, was the default ES-345TD, the Cherry finish was denoted as ES-345TDC and the natural finish as ES-345TDN.

== Specifications ==
1958 saw the introduction of Gibson's new thinline series of guitars in the ES-335 and 355, both of which came with a semi-hollow body. The bodies were made of laminated maple with spruce bracing, and a solid maple center block - designed to prevent unwanted feedback from the pickups - extending from the base of the body (where the strap button is mounted) all the way to the mahogany neck, along with a rosewood fingerboard.

The fretboard of the guitar has what are known as "split parallelogram" inlays. The guitar also features a stereo pickup configuration and 6-position Varitone circuit on certain models. The varitone's positions were not properly defined by Gibson, which left players describing the various sounds of the varitone dial positions as "squishy", "underwater", and "guitar-in-a-box". What the varitone does is run the signal from the pickups through any number of chokes installed in the guitar, which produces pre-set frequency scoops in the sound of the guitar whilst also keeping highs and lows.

At the same time, Gibson also manufactured a variant of the ES-355, with the model suffix 'TD-SV', which was, in effect, a fancier version of both the 335 and 345. However, both the 345 and 355TD-SV did not become as popular as the simpler ES-335 model. One reason was that both the ES-345 and the ES-355 each required a 'Y' cable and a TRS jack to separate the pickup signals, whereas the much simpler mono ES-335 did not require any special equipment to function properly. The original ES-345 came with gold-plated nickel parts and PAF humbuckers. Early models from 1959 and 1960 featured long pickguards, which extended all the way to the bridge, but it was shortened in 1961 on all models.

During the early years of manufacture, Gibson installed a Stoptail bridge on models without a vibrato unit, but beginning in 1964 they began to transition into installing gold trapeze tailpieces on ES-345s. It was not until 1982 that Gibson transitioned back to stoptail bridges on the ES-345. Some of the first Gibson ES-345s also shipped with a Bigsby vibrato tailpiece.

A limited series of cherry-colored ES-345s was released in 2025. This corresponds with the 40th anniversary of the film Back to the Future. The line is a faithful replica of Marty's guitar from the film. Two models were released, one by Gibson and one by Epiphone. They came with an array of additional Back to the Future paraphanellia. This includes a hard case with the logo of Marvin Berry and the Starlighters, the McFly family photo and a Flux Capacitor.

== Notable players ==
- Elvin Bishop
- George Harrison
- Steve Howe, main guitar on the 1972 album Close to the Edge.
- Hiroki Kamemoto
- Jorma Kaukonen
- B.B. King
- Freddie King
- Marty McFly — Michael J. Fox appeared with two different ES-345s in both Back to the Future and Back to the Future Part II respectively. The ES-345 featured in the first movie is now the subject of a search by Gibson, known as "Lost To The Future".
- John McLaughlin — Bought in 1978, his 1976 instrument has been modified with a scalloped fingerboard, a mini-humbucker in the neck, and a Bigsby B12 vibrola.
- Bill Nelson
- Harry Vanda
- Bob Weir acquired an ES-345TDC in 1967. From 1971 until early 1973 it was his primary guitar.
- Bob Welch used a Gibson ES-345 and a heavily modified Fender Stratocaster on Fleetwood Mac's 1971 album, Future Games.
- Marcus King
