= Gibson J-45 =

Acoustic guitar

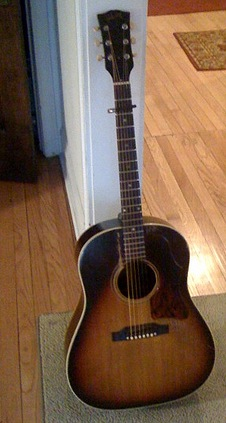
- A 1967 Gibson J-45
- Manufacturer: Gibson
- Period: 1942–present

Construction
- Body type: Jumbo
- Neck joint: Dovetail
- Scale: 24 3/4

Woods
- Body: Sitka Spruce top Mahogany back and sides
- Neck: Mahogany
- Fretboard: Rosewood

Hardware
- Bridge: Rosewood

Colors available
- Natural, Heritage Cherry Sunburst, Vintage Sunburst

The Gibson J-45 is an acoustic guitar manufactured by Gibson. Widely regarded as Gibson's most famous and widely used acoustic model, it is often described as a "workhorse" guitar. The “J” designation refers to Gibson’s jumbo body style. Introduced in 1934, the jumbo represented Gibson’s response to the growing popularity of large-bodied flat-top acoustic guitars in the early 1930s, a market then largely defined by C. F. Martin & Company's dreadnought designs. The J-45 features a body depth of over 4 inches from endpin to neck heel and a rounded, "sloped-shoulder" outline that distinguishes it from the squarer upper bouts common to dreadnought-style guitars. While both designs occupy a similar segment of the acoustic guitar market, the J-45's proportions and construction give it a distinct tonal and visual identity.

The J-45 is most commonly associated with its vintage sunburst finish. Over the course of its production history, however, the J-45 has been offered in a variety of finishes and color variations, reflecting changes in manufacturing practices, materials, and market preferences. The structurally similar, natural-finish J-50 was first introduced in 1942 but did not enter continuous production until 1947.

== History ==
Introduced in 1942 to replace the inexpensive Great Depression-era flattop J-35, the J-45 standardized the company's approach to the dreadnought guitar. With a list price of $45, it nonetheless initially only varied slightly, with strengthened internal bracing and a new teardrop-shaped pickguard. A headstock decal with the Gibson logo replaced both the old stark white silkscreened 'Gibson' of the thirties and the slogan "Only a Gibson Is Good Enough." It also had a more rounded, "baseball bat" style neck, as opposed to the "V" shape of the J-35 neck. The version produced today is substantially similar to the 1942 model.

Cosmetically, the J-45 was understated, intended as a durable no-frills "workhorse guitar" (its nickname given by the manufacturer). Although a few triple-bound top types were initially produced, the standard single binding was simple, soundhole ring austere, and neck only sported modest dot-shaped mother of pearl fretboard position markers. Gibson used a sunburst finish to cover up imperfections in the wood joins. The top was solid spruce, the back and sides solid mahogany. Over time the sunburst has become iconic, with collectors preferring the J-45 to the higher-end J-50s of the same era. Apart from a small batch of natural-finish J-45s produced in 1942, the model was offered only in sunburst.

=== 1969 Gibson J-45 ===
Starting in 1968 Gibson made J-45s as square-shouldered dreadnought-shaped guitars with a longer scale (25.5"), similar to the Gibson Dove. Serial numbers tell us that during '68 and '69 both slope-shouldered and square-shouldered J-45s were made before the model changeover was complete. In the '70s the J-45 was re-labeled as the J-45 Deluxe. A short run of slope-shouldered J-45 Celebrity models were made in 1984. By the late '90s the slope-shouldered body style returned for good.

=== Gibson J-50 ===
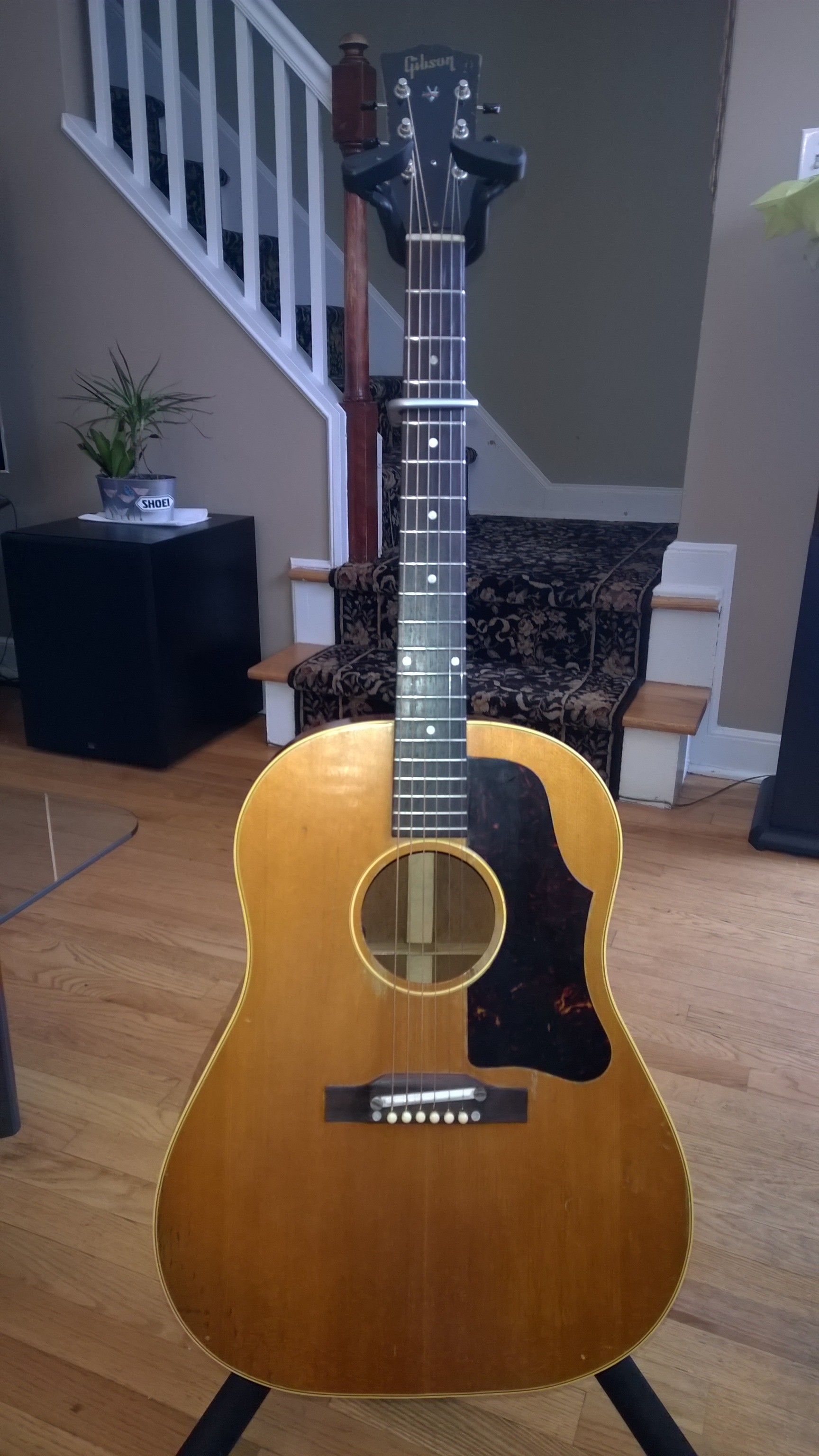
Gibson J-50

The J-50 guitar is essentially a natural-finish J-45, with a triple rather than single-bound top and other minor differences in trim. Gibson produced a handful in 1942 using high quality wood laid up before World War II-induced shortages took hold. By 1947 supplies had resumed, resulting in the model's official introduction. There are mid-1960s J45 guitars with a natural finish and adjustable bridges and this can be checked by the stamp on the back seam brace.

== Notable players of the J-45 ==
- Zach Bryan
- Donovan
- Bob Dylan
- Vince Gill
- John Hammond
- John Hiatt
- Eric Idle (used for composing "Always Look on the Bright Side of Life")
- Hiroki Kamemoto
- Gary Kemp
- Elliott Smith
- Bruce Springsteen

== Notable players of the J-50 ==
- Jorma Kaukonen
- James Taylor
- Gillian Welch

== Gallery ==
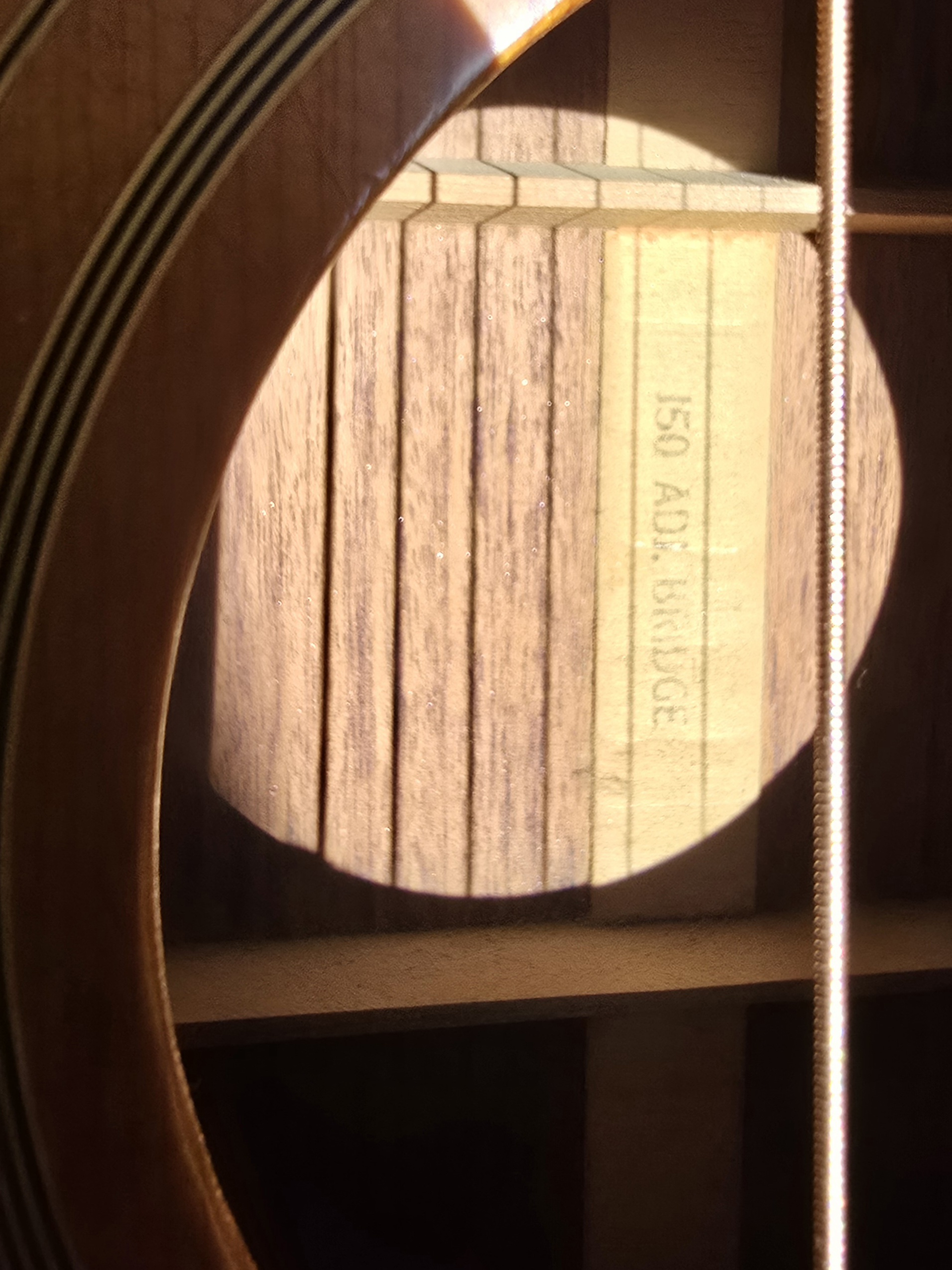
1964 J-50 adjustable bridge back brace stamp

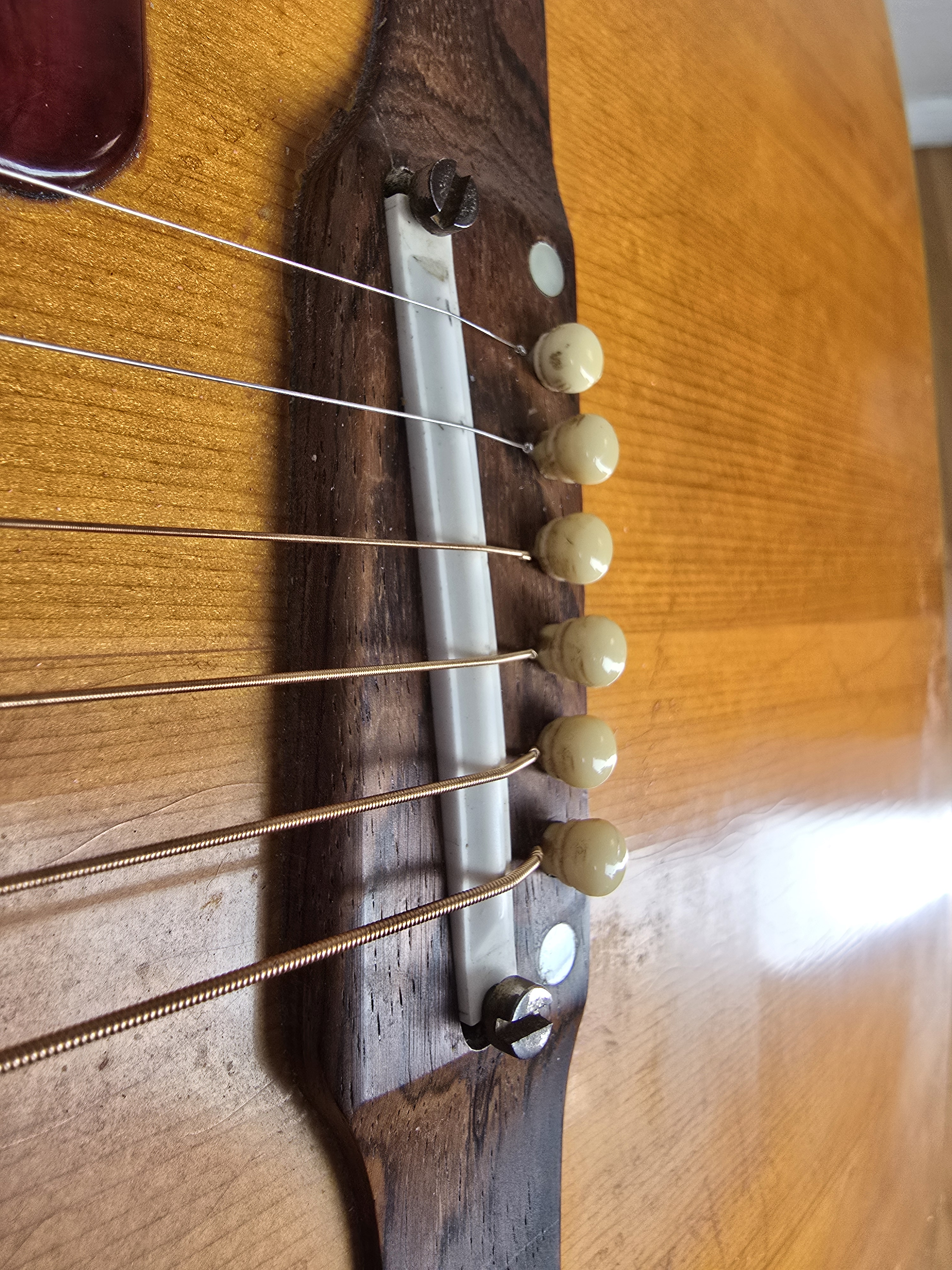
1964 Gibson J-50 showing adjustable bridge with ceramic saddle

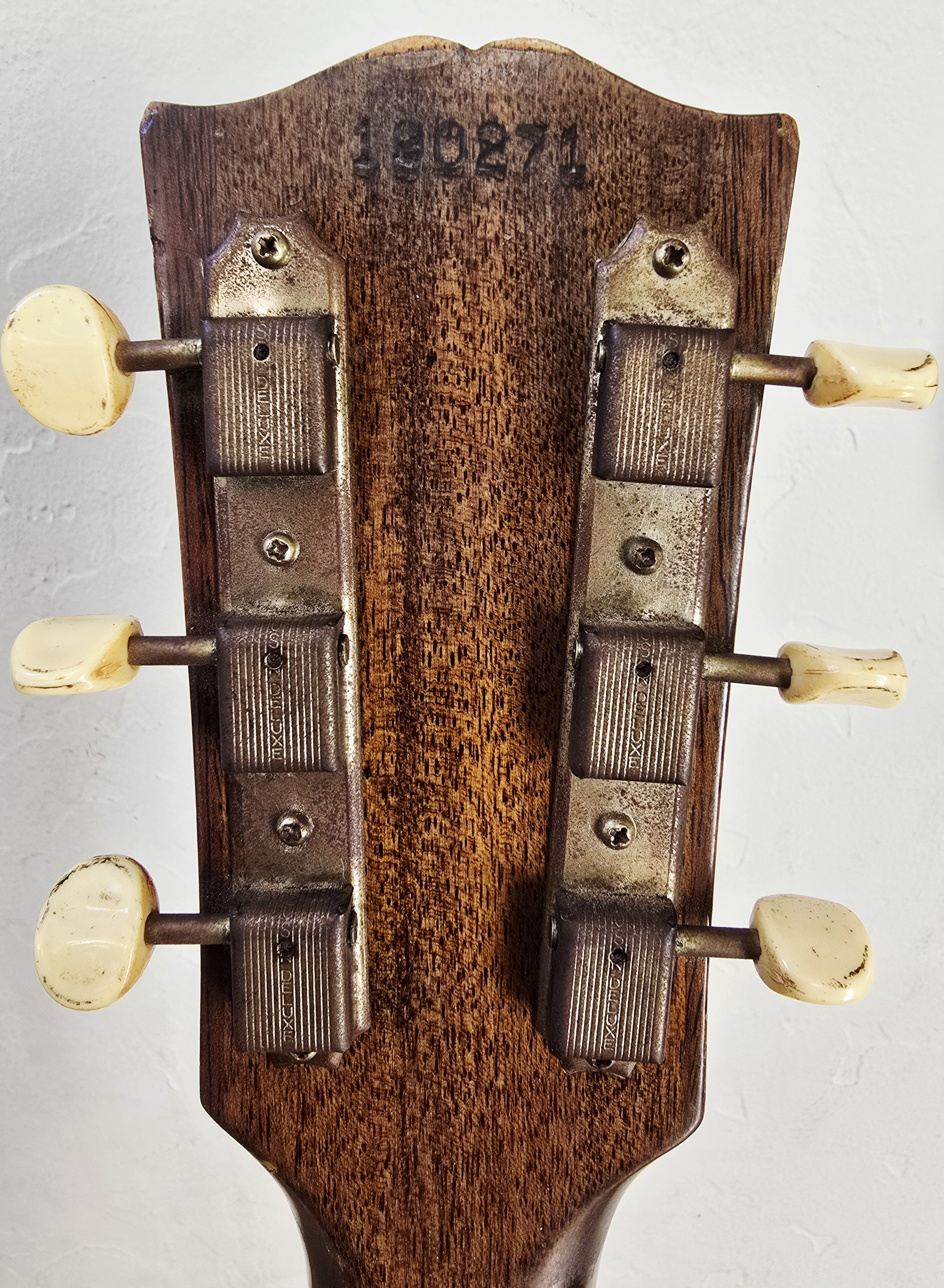
1964 vintage Kluson tuning machine on a J-50

== Notes ==
- Gruhn, George; Walter Carter (March 2008). "The Gibson J-45". Vintage Guitar magazine. 22 (5): 46.
