= Analogfish =

Japanese rock band

- Origin: Japan
- Genres: Rock, Alternative rock
- Years active: 1999 – Present
- Members: Akira Shimooka; Kentarō Sasaki; Shūichirō Saitō
- Website: http://www.analogfish.com

Analogfish (アナログフィッシュ, Anarogufisshu) is a Japanese rock band formed in 1999. The band is best known to Western audiences for its song "Speed", which was featured as the 10th ending theme for the popular anime Naruto.

== History ==
All of the band members were born between 1978 and 1979. Akira and Kentarō were acquaintances in school and regularly made music together, releasing a demo tape in 1999. They later moved to Tokyo, where Shūichirō joined the band in April 2002. Later that year, they released a new demo tape with 9 tracks.

In June 2003 they released their first album, Sekai wa Maboroshi (世界は幻, The World Vision) and in December of the same year they released their second album Nichiyōbi no Yoru Mitai da (日曜日の夜みたいだ, Looks Like Sunday Night). During June 2004, the band released a self-titled album as well as re-releasing their first two albums. In July and August of 2004, they took part in the Fuji Rock Festival and in September they released their first major album, Hello Hello Hello. To end the year, they started their first national tour, ending in December.

The band have also taken part in festivals such as the Rock in Japan Festival and the Nano-Mugen Festival in 2008.

== Members ==
- Akira Shimooka (下岡 晃, Shimooka Akira) – vocals, guitar
- Kentarō Sasaki (佐々木 健太郎, Sasaki Kentarō) – vocals, bass
- Shūichirō Saitō (斉藤 州一郎, Saitō Shūichirō) – vocals, drums (withdrew on March 10, 2008 for medical reasons, but returned on October 10, 2009)

== Discography ==
=== Singles ===
- Super Loud (October 11, 2023)
- Radio Star (July 20, 2023)
- Ripples (おもいつくかぎりのすべて) (August 23, 2023)
- Moonlight (December 8, 2021)
- Is it Too Late? (October 13, 2021)
- Saturday Night Sky (September 1, 2021)
- Still Life (July 25, 2018)
- With You (Get it On) (November 3, 2017)
- Show Ga Hajimaru Yo (SHOWがはじまるよ, SHOW Will Start) (August 13, 2014)
- Nightriders (December 15, 2010)
- Saigo No Future (最後のfuture, The Last Future) (April 7, 2010)
- Magic (November 1, 2006)
- Anthem (アンセム, Ansemu) (July 19, 2006)
- Living in the City (May 10, 2006)
- Speed (スピード, Supīdo) (August 3, 2005)

=== Mini albums ===
- BGM? (February 23, 2005)
- Hello Hello Hello (September 23, 2004)

=== Albums ===
- SNS (December 8, 2021)
- Still Life (July 25, 2018)
- Almost A Rainbow (September 16, 2015)
- Saikin no Bokura (最近のぼくら, Our Recent Self) (October 18, 2014)
- NEWCLEAR (March 6, 2013)
- Kouya / On the Wild Side (荒野, On the Wild Side) (September 7, 2011)
- Life Goes On (February 10, 2010)
- Fish My Life (July 16, 2008)
- Rock Is Harmony (November 22, 2006)
- Kiss (September 21, 2005)
- Analogfish (アナログフィッシュ, Anarogufisshu) (June 23, 2004)
- Nichiyōbi no Yoru Mitai da (日曜日の夜みたいだ, Looks Like Sunday Night) (December 3, 2003)
- Sekai wa Maboroshi (世界は幻, The World Vision) (June 25, 2003)
