= Live house =

Japanese live music venue

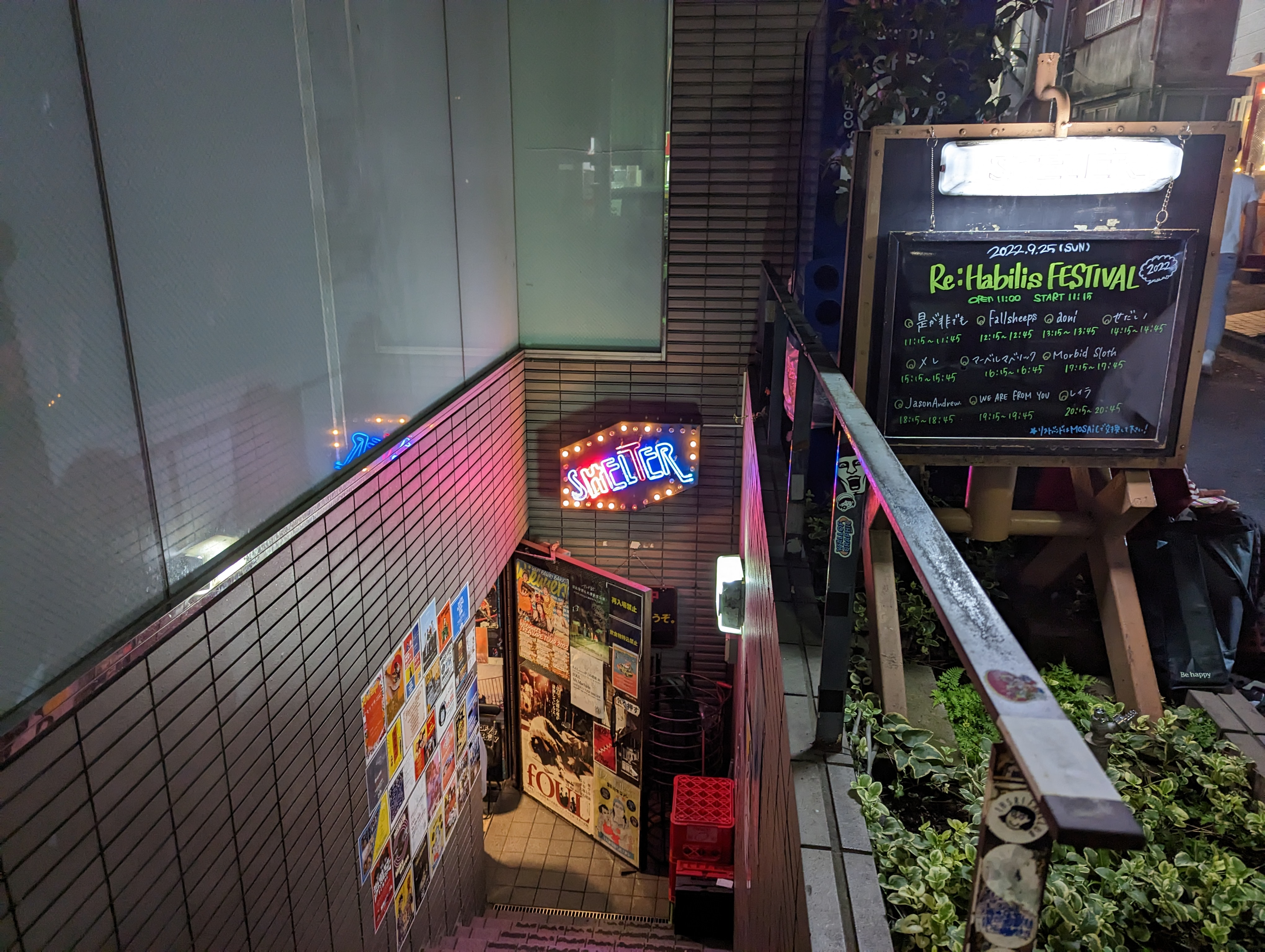
Shelter, a live house located in Shimokitazawa

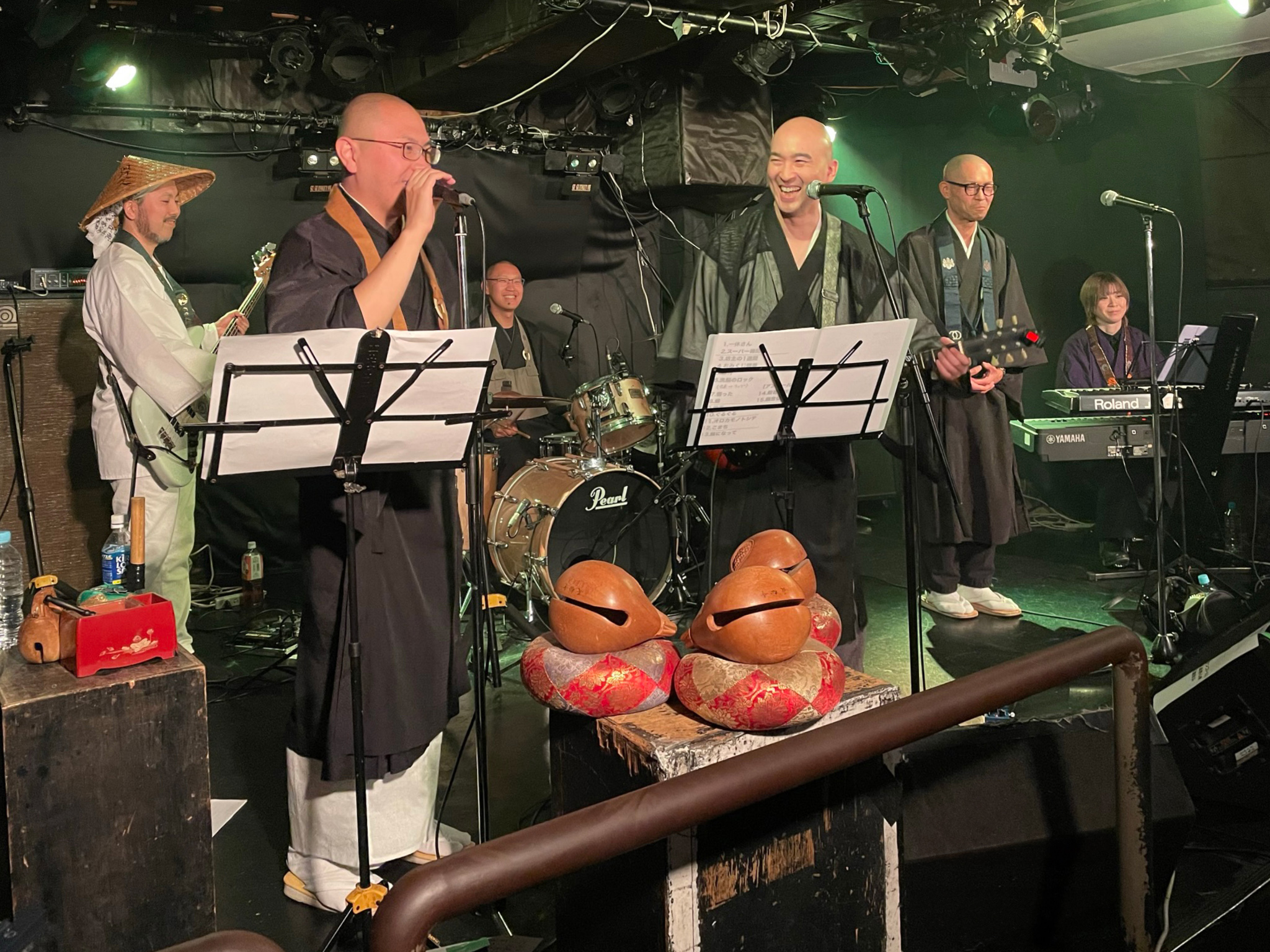
Stage of a live house in Tokyo

A live house (Japanese: ライブハウス, Hepburn: raibu hausu) is a Japanese live music venue. The term is a Japanese coinage (wasei eigo) and is mainly used in East Asia. It most frequently refers to smaller venues, which may double as bars, especially featuring rock, jazz, blues, and folk music.

== History ==
Live houses emerged in the early 1970s as part of the booming indie scene. At the beginning, they were similar to rock pubs, where dinner was accompanied by live music. By the end of the decade, chairs were removed and they adopted the format known today. The live house scene got a boost from the phenomena called Tokyo Rockers, a punk rock movement that started in 1978 by the opening of S-Ken studio venue. In the 80s, the Japanese rock scene experienced the so-called band-boom stage, where amateur, indie artists, debuting at small live houses, were picked up by large record labels. The live houses were reduced to a stepping-stone to further one's career and the establishments became part of the music industry cycle, contrary to the original purpose of being unique underground venues for rebellious bands.

One of Tokyo's oldest live houses is Shinjuku Loft, that opened in 1971 as a jazz café, and Shinjuku Ruido, that founded in 1972. One of the oldest live houses in Kyoto is Coffee House Jittoku founded in 1973 in an old sake warehouse.

Due to the restrictions during the COVID-19 pandemic in 2020 and 2021, the livelihood of many live houses was jeopardized and several had to shut down. Some live houses tried to organize crowd-funding projects to survive. Today there are roughly 1,000 live houses in Japan, and around 300 in Tokyo alone.

== Operation ==
=== Style ===
Because live houses operate locally, the music scenes that develop also develop locally. The culture and circles that form in one metropolitan area can vary from city to city. Thus the scene in Tokyo can often sound very different from the scene that developed and continues to develop in Osaka. These musicians can vary in age and background, but frequently share a desire "to maintain creative control, and a preference to keeping it over signing with labels that would offer them greater opportunity at creativity's expense.". Usually bands perform what has been termed "underground" music (アングラ in Japanese), which simply means music associated with bands without labels or major labels. This can take the shape of heavy rock to emo core, and is often very experimental.

In support of this new exploration in music, but opposed to the business model live houses established, some establishments developed what has become known as Onkyokei, or Onkyo for short, which is just as experimental but in settings that don't demand so much from the audience or performers.

=== Ticket selling ===
Because live houses are locally based, often the bands performing are from nearby areas with local connections and fanbases. These live houses can use a variety of business models, but among the most popular is that of the quota system, otherwise known as "Noruma". In this system, the live house requires bands performing to sell a predetermined number of tickets to cover costs. If there weren't enough tickets sold, the uncovered costs are put on the performing bands so the house itself doesn't bear any expense. This system often results in small local bands asking their friends and families to buy tickets just to break even on performances. The quota requirement doesn't prevent the live houses from being competitive, evident in them often booking bands for a given night by having auditions beforehand.

Other business models may be used differently or in combination too exist, such as requiring all viewers to buy a drink upon entry, which cost 500 yen to 1000 yen. These models can struggle, because unlike western consumer culture alcohol consumption is not assumed just because one is coming to listen to music.

=== Capacity ===
Attendance in these live houses varies largely by capacity. Some live houses are built to be small and intimate, while others can host thousands of people. In general, attendees come for specific bands they're supporting, not for just the general atmosphere of the establishment. A change in band will often draw a change in crowds. While live houses offer food and drinks, attendees come first and foremost to enjoy the live music. In many cases, audiences won't drink at all to better experience the music.
