= The Vocaloid Collection =

Semi-annual online music event

- Nickname: VocaColle
- Status: Active
- Genre: Vocaloid
- Frequency: Semi-annual
- Country: Japan
- Years active: 2020–present
- Organiser: Dwango
- Sponsors: Agency for Cultural Affairs
- Website: vocaloid-collection.jp

The Vocaloid Collection, stylized as The VOCALOID Collection and usually shortened to just VocaColle (ボカコレ), is a biannual Japanese online music event and cultural festival centered around the Vocaloid subculture on the video-sharing platform Niconico. It is organized by the company Dwango and funded via the Agency for Cultural Affairs's Japan Creator Support Fund.

== Overview ==
The Vocaloid Collection is an online cultural festival in Japan that focuses on the Vocaloid subculture, specifically on the video-sharing platform Niconico, and the world's largest Vocaloid event focused on user submissions. It is organized by Dwango. Music producers from across the internet can participate, with works that use any vocal synthesis software such as Vocaloid, Utau, or Synthesizer V being eligible for the event. The event is held twice per year, and spans several days. The event is funded through the Japan Creator Support Fund grant from the Agency for Cultural Affairs.

The event features several popularity rankings for submitted videos, including the "Top 100", "Rookie" (which focuses on works by those who have been Vocaloid producers for less than two years), and "Remix" categories. Additionally, in VocaColle 2026 Winter, a new category without rankings, "Exhibition", was added. Other previously included categories are "MMD&3DCG", "Performance", and "Novelty Song". Traditionally, participants create a brand new song for the event, though it is also permitted to create a new music video for an existing song if the song hasn't been posted on Niconico before.

For the "Remix" category, song stems are often released for existing Vocaloid songs. For example, VocaColle 2026 Summer would see the release of stem files for the collaboration songs for Sonic Racing: CrossWorlds, including Camellia's "Denkoh Sekka" and cosMo@BousouP's "We Are Pico Pico Hammers!!!!". Some participants collaborate on a single entry, such as Marasy, Jin, and Shōta Horie (also known as Kemu)'s collaborative song that placed first in the Top 100 ranking of VocaColle 2023 Spring.

== History ==
The event began in December 2020 as a spin-off of the Niconico Chokaigi event. In 2024, a cyberattack was launched against Niconico, which led to the VocaColle 2024 Summer event, originally scheduled to be held between August 2nd and 5th, being postponed and eventually cancelled. The "Exhibition" category was added in 2026 to address increasing competitiveness in the event, which some participants were starting to grow tired of.

=== Past winners ===
Winners by Event and Category (Note: Winners sourced from official website. Official English title used where available.)
Event	Top 100 (Note: Early events used "Top 20" or "Top 30".)	Rookie	Remix	Novelty Song	Utaite	Dance cover	Performance	MMD&3DCG
2020 Winter	R Sound Design - "Forward"	Hiiragi Magnetite - "Shūen Tōhikō"	Oster Project - "Suki! Yuki! Honki Magic"	—	Ado - "Black Rock Shooter"	Meter x Kyōju - "Telecaster B-Boy"	Hazuki Hisame - "Torinoko City"	—
2021 Spring	Hiiragi Kirai - "Eureka"	Ukaroku - "Self-Proclaimed Music Enthusiast"	Utsu-P - "Hibana (Mixture Remix)"	—	Ado - "Love is War"	Kozue Aikawa - "Luka Luka★Night Fever 2015"	Benetnasch - "Ah! Vocaloid Kyōsōkyoku"	Nari no Kuma - "WAVE"
2021 Autumn	Keina Suda - "Pamela"	Fushi - "Invisible"	Hayu-cha - "New Super Lagtrain"	—	Koushi - "Aki no Mikakunin Seibutsu"	Babo - "God-ish"	Hare Ichiban - "Nn... Aaah..."	Ashiya Coffee - "Living Millennium"
2022 Spring	R-906 - "At the Mercy"	Loar - "Emotional Deceive"	Nununu (Note: Artist name clipped for readability, full artist name is Nunununununununununununununununu.) - "Gocha Gocha Urusee!"	—	—	Meter x Poroshi - "Salamander"	Kurumi Otanimiya - "Nico Dō no Ranking ga VocaColle de Moriagatterukara Hen'naodori o Shite mo Tabun Barenai no Uta"	MobiusP - "Primary Star"
2022 Autumn	Iyowa - "Heat Abnormal"	A4. - "Angel Wings"	Nununu - "Game Kaitte Kudasai!!! (Short Ver.)"	—	—	—	Kitto Zutto Bouchi. - "Jā Kimi no Shisō ga Shineba Ii"	Hōkidō - "Melancholy Night"
2023 Spring	Marasy x Jin x Shōta Horie (Kemu) - "New Human Race"	Nununu - "Youkoso Shichū Udon Sentō e!!"	Mata Setsunai Sekai o Ikiru - "Yaminabe!!!!"	—	—	—	Jio - "Tondemo Wonderz"	Hitotomezuki Sanozuki - "Living Millennium"
2023 Autumn	Inabakumori - "Relayouter"	Umicha - "Odorobo"	Iyowa - "Ghost Girl"	Nununu - "I'll Do My Best to ☆ Contribute to Society!!"	—	—	Rerā - "Long Tone Test"	MobiusP - "Rabbit Hole"
2024 Winter	Sasuke Haraguchi - "Medicine"	Dagashi O-gata - "Achikochi Date-san"	Iyowa - "Relayouter"	Nununu - "Zundamon wa Otokonoko desu"	—	—	—	—
2025 Winter	Abaraya - "Hanabira, Sore ni Matsuwaru Onsei"	Hiragi - "Marionette Dancer"	Oster Project - "Sukina Sōzai Happyō ~Kokoro wo Komete Remix~"	—	—	—	—	—
2025 Summer	Umicha - "Maku o Orosou, Parade e"	Sabio - "Ribbon"	Niru Kajitsu - "Children Record"	—	—	—	—	—
2026 Winter	Yamamoto - "De los Santos"	Inoutsu wa SA - "Ichi Oku-nen Koishiteru"	Namigroove - "Mimukauwa Nice Try"	—	—	—	—	—
2026 Summer	OSTER Project - "Ongaku wa Tsuzuku"	Doa no Nobu - "Anata no Kioku"	Namigroove - "De los Santos"	—	—	—	—	—

== Rewards ==
Each event has special rewards from sponsors of the event. In 2023, winning songs were added to Sega's arcade rhythm game Chunithm. The 2026 Summer event features various rewards, including one song from the Top 100 or Rookie category being selected to be used as the ending theme for the upcoming season 2 of the Gate anime. Several events have had top songs from the Top 100 and Rookie categories added to Hatsune Miku: Colorful Stage!.

== Reception and cultural impact ==
VocaColle is widely seen as an important event in the scene and a chance for up-and-coming creators to get the public's eyes on their work. Daisuke Amano, writing for the Shizuoka Shimbun, describes the event as "a stepping stone for aspiring Vocaloid producers". This is echoed by Billboard Japan's Yuka Higaki, who called the "Rookie" category "a gateway to success for young Vocaloid artists", as well as producer Yuri Kuriyama, who said the event has become "like a gateway to success for people who want to make a living through music". Another producer, 40mP, referred to VocaColle as a "gathering place" in an increasingly spread out community that now crosses into other websites such as YouTube and TikTok. The event helps the submitted songs gain popularity not just during the event, but after it ends as well.

Producers in the Vocaloid scene tend to take VocaColle and its rankings very seriously. On the matter of the competition, veteran Vocaloid producer Oster Project told Real Sound that she thinks "there are a lot of people who view VocaColle as a place to discover new talent", and that some view established creators participating as "disrupting the rankings". Oster also mentions drama surrounding late submissions climbing the rankings, and how a late submission typically places you at a disadvantage. In another Real Sound interview, fellow producer 32ki said that many participants struggle with the competitive nature, even calling VocaColle a "really cruel event". Iyowa echoes this sentiment, saying that as the event gets bigger, the more participants you see struggling due to not being able to achieve the rankings they wanted to.

In 2024, J-pop rapper Daoko participated in the Rookie category of the Winter event, using Kasane Teto for her song. She spoke about her decision to sign up in Real Sound, saying that while she's been in the music industry for a long time, she's a newcomer to the world of Vocaloid, and that she thinks it helps producers who struggle without a deadline.
