= The Vampire (song) =

2021 single by Deco*27

Single by Deco*27

from the album Mannequin
- Released: March 9, 2021
- Genre: Vocaloid, pop
- Length: 3:00
- Songwriters: Deco*27, Rockwell (Note: Arrangement)
- Producer: Deco*27

Deco*27 singles chronology
"Heart Impulse" (2020)	"The Vampire" (2021)	"Undercover" (2021)

Music video
- Deco*27 - The Vampire feat. Hatsune Miku - YouTube on YouTube

"The Vampire" (Japanese: ヴァンパイア) is a song by Japanese Vocaloid producer Deco*27, as well as a novel and manga series based on it. It was released on March 9, 2021, and features vocals by the vocal synthesizer Hatsune Miku. It is included as the lead single on the album Mannequin, which was released on March 9, 2022.

== Composition ==
Deco*27's 62nd song, the work features a music video (MV) depicting the profile of the protagonist, a vampire girl wearing a mask. It expresses various romantic feelings unique to adolescence, such as the protagonist's jealousy toward her lover, her desire for love through blood-sucking, and lovesickness. The colloquial expressions in the lyrics were reportedly influenced by 326 (Mitsuru) and Orange Range.

Writer Natsume Sogami positions this work as a representative song in line with the EDM trend starting from 2019, alongside tracks like Kanaria's "King", Tsumiki's "Phony", and PinocchioP's "God-ish".

== Production ==
Deco*27 came up with the title of the work after noticing the phrase "I'm a vampire" (あたしヴァンパイア) in a notepad where he jots down words that catch his interest.

Production took place over roughly two weeks from the end of 2020 to the beginning of 2021. Starting from the idea of combining Hatsune Miku with an idol, he decided to steer it in a bright direction, stating that he produced it intuitively. He wrote the lyrics while thinking, "It would be cute if Miku sang like this." The album Mannequin, later released in March 2022, was based on the concept of "What if an idol group was entirely made up of Hatsune Miku," and he noted that songs included alongside it, such as "Animal" and "Cinderella", were challenges he could only undertake because he successfully brought out a "cute style" of Miku in this track.

Deco*27 regards this song as a catalyst for "change", which subsequently led to the creation of several pop-oriented songs such as "Rabbit Hole", "Salamander", and "Volt Tackle". In his own words, "I hate it when listeners get bored, and I hate getting bored of myself." Furthermore, regarding the song's massive success, he remarked, "It has completely surpassed 'Mozaik Role', which I released in 2010."

The song's duration of exactly 3 minutes is intentional, reportedly designed with a cup noodle timer in mind.

== Reception ==
To commemorate the milestone, Deco*27 launched a TikTok account. The hit rapidly accelerated on TikTok as well, with its YouTube views surpassing 38 million by February 2022 and over 50 million by August 2022. Additionally, it became a massive hit on Niconico Video, recording over 4.9 million views as of March 2023. In October of 2026, the song reached 100 million views on YouTube, being Deco*27's third song to do so.

== Derived works ==
=== Manga ===
A manga adaptation of the song began serialization in Ichijinsha's comic HOWL on January 25, 2023. A compiled volume was released on January 16, 2024.

- DECO*27 (Original Concept/Supervision) • Shiki Yamori (Manga) Vampire, Ichijinsha <HOWL Comics>, 3 volumes published (as of June 16, 2025)
  1. Released January 16, 2024, ISBN 978-4-7580-2640-6
  2. Released December 25, 2024, ISBN 978-4-7580-2784-7
  3. Released June 16, 2025, ISBN 978-4-7580-2917-9
  4. Released March 16, 2026, ISBN 978-4-7580-8915-9

=== Novel ===
A light novel based on the song has been published under Ichijinsha's HOWL Novels label.

- Jun Esaka (Author) • Hachi San (Illustrations) • DECO*27 (Original Concept/Supervision) Vampire, Ichijinsha <HOWL Novels>, 2 volumes published (as of July 30, 2025)
  1. Released March 18, 2024, ISBN 978-4-7580-2670-3
  2. Released July 30, 2025, ISBN 978-4-7580-2920-9

== Charts ==
=== Weekly charts ===
Chart (2022)	Peak position
Japan Top User Generated Songs (Billboard Japan)	4

=== Year-end charts ===
Chart (2021)	Position
Japan Top User Generated Songs (Billboard Japan)	7
Chart (2022)	Position
Japan Top User Generated Songs (Billboard Japan)	3
Chart (2023)	Position
Japan Top User Generated Songs (Billboard Japan)	7
