= Project Voltage =

Japanese art and music project

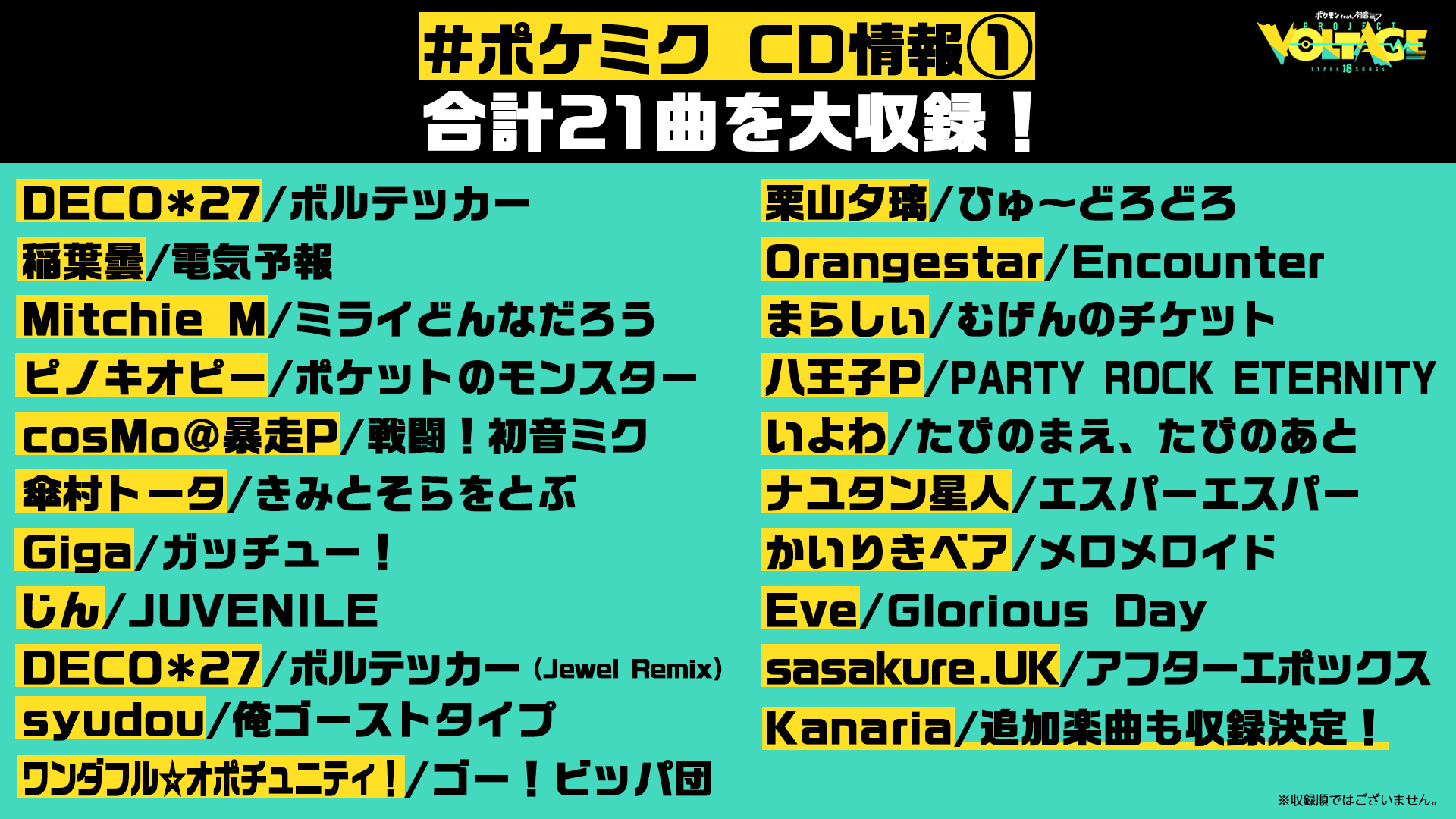
The Project Voltage 18 Types/Songs tracklist

Pokémon feat. Hatsune Miku: Project Voltage, (Note: Japanese: ポケモン feat. 初音ミク Project VOLTAGE, Hepburn: Pokemon fīchāringu Hatsune Miku Purojekuto Borutēji) also known as simply Project Voltage or PokéMiku, (Note: Japanese: ポケミク, Hepburn: Pokemiku) is an ongoing song and art collaboration project between The Pokémon Company and Crypton Future Media, featuring the Pokémon franchise and Vocaloid virtual singer software Hatsune Miku, starting September 2023. Project Voltage features 18 pieces of artwork, each featuring Hatsune Miku in the style of one of the 18 Pokémon types, with a Pokémon as a partner as well as 18 songs from 18 different notable Vocaloid producers, all featuring Hatsune Miku.

A continuation of the project, called Pokémon feat. Hatsune Miku: Project Voltage High↑, was announced on August 31, 2024. New songs will be uploaded on an irregular basis and will feature up-and-coming Vocaloid producers.

On August 31, 2025, on the second anniversary of the project, the live show Pokémon feat. Hatsune Miku: Voltage Live! was announced, to be held from March 20 to March 22, 2026, at LaLa Arena Tokyo-Bay in Funabashi, featuring live performances of Project Voltage songs.

== List of songs ==
Songs
| No. | Title (Note: All songs featuring Hatsune Miku.) | Release date | Producer | Ref. | Notes |
|---|---|---|---|---|---|
| 1 | "Volt Tackle" (Note: ボルテッカ, Borutekka) | September 29, 2023 | Deco*27 | | 18 Types/Songs |
| 2 | "Electrical Forecast" | October 6, 2023 | Inabakumori | | 18 Types/Songs |
| 3 | "What Kind of Future?" (Note: ミライどんなだろう？, Miraidon-na Darou?) | October 13, 2023 | Mitchie M | | 18 Types/Songs |
| 4 | "The Pokémon Inside My Heart" (Note: ポケットのモンスター, Poketto no Monsuta) | October 20, 2023 | PinocchioP | | 18 Types/Songs |
| 5 | "Battle! (Hatsune Miku)" (Note: 衝撃！初音ミク, Shougeki! Hatsune Miku) | December 1, 2023 | CosMo@BousouP | | 18 Types/Songs |
| 6 | "Fly Through the Sky with You" (Note: きみとそらをとぶ, Kimi to Sora wo Tobu) (featuring Megurine Luka) | December 8, 2023 | Kasamura Tota | | 18 Types/Songs |
| 7 | "I GOT YOU!" (Note: ガッチュー！, Gacchu!) (featuring Kagamine Rin & Len) | December 15, 2023 | Giga | | 18 Types/Songs |
| 8 | "Juvenile" | December 22, 2023 | Jin | | 18 Types/Songs |
| 9 | "I'm a Ghost Type" (Note: 俺ゴーストタイプ, Ore Ghost Type) | January 27, 2024 | Syudou | | 18 Types/Songs |
| 10 | "Go! Team Bidoof!" (Note: ゴー！ビッパ団, Go! Bippa Dan) (featuring Kagamine Rin & Len) | February 2, 2024 | Wonderful Opportunity | | 18 Types/Songs |
| 11 | "Huh, Muddled" (featuring Meiko) | February 9, 2024 | Kuriyama Yuri (from Van de Shop) | | 18 Types/Songs |
| 12 | "Encounter" | February 16, 2024 | Orangestar | | 18 Types/Songs |
| 13 | "Eon Ticket" (featuring Kaito) | February 17, 2024 | Marasy | | 18 Types/Songs |
| 14 | "Party Rock Eternity" | February 23, 2024 | HachiojiP | | 18 Types/Songs |
| 15 | "Journey's Prequels, Journey's Traces" | February 27, 2024 | Iyowa | | 18 Types/Songs |
| 16 | "Psychic, Psychic!" (Note: エスパーエスパー, Esupa Esupa) | March 1, 2024 | NayutalieN | | 18 Types/Songs |
| 17 | "Melomeloid" | March 3, 2024 | Kairiki Bear | | 18 Types/Songs |
| 18 | "Glorious Day" | March 9, 2024 | Eve | | 18 Types/Songs |
| 19 | "After Epochs" | May 10, 2024 | Sasakure.UK | | |
| 20 | "Champion" | July 19, 2024 | Kanaria | | |
| 21 | "Evolution Evolution Evolution" | December 6, 2024 | Sasuke Haraguchi | | High↑ |
| 22 | "Facade Question" (featuring Kasane Teto) | April 1, 2025 | 32ki | | High↑ |
| 23 | "Ooparts" | September 19, 2025 | Nilfruits | | High↑ |
| 24 | "Heart Pounding" (featuring Kagamine Len) | October 21, 2025 | Surii | | High↑ |
| 25 | "Tabidachi no Uta" | January 28, 2026 | Karasuya Sabou | | High↑ |
| 26 | "Spiral Melodies" | February 27, 2026 | Omoi | | High↑ |
| 27 | "Crossroad" | March 9, 2026 | kz-livetune and TAKU INOUE | | High↑ |

Remixes
| Title | Release date | Remixer(s) | Ref. |
|---|---|---|---|
| "Volt Tackle (Jewel Remix)" | January 26, 2024 | Deco*27 & Tepe | |
| "Journey's Prequels, Journey's Traces (Tabitabi Remix)" | November 13, 2024 | Inabakumori | |
| "Electrical Forecast (Bachibachi Remix)" | November 13, 2024 | Iyowa | |
| "Facade Question (Kuriyama Yuri Remix)" (featuring Kasane Teto) | April 1, 2026 | Kuriyama Yuri | |

On March 9, the official account for Project Voltage announced the upcoming release of a Project Voltage CD album. On May 10, they revealed it would include 21 songs as well as new illustrations. Pre-orders opened on the same day; the album was released on November 13, 2024.

Artworks and support illustrations
| No. | Artwork name | Featured Pokémon | Release date | Artist | Ref. |
|---|---|---|---|---|---|
| 1 | Teaser visual | Farfetch'd | August 31, 2023 | KEI | |
| 2 | Psychic-type | Meloetta | September 4, 2023 | take | |
| 3 | Grass-type | Rillaboom | September 5, 2023 | Mizutani Megumi | |
| 4 | Fire-type | Skeledirge | September 6, 2023 | Mizutani Megumi | |
| 5 | Water-type | Primarina | September 7, 2023 | Mizutani Megumi | |
| 6 | Electric-type | Rotom | September 8, 2023 | kannnu | |
| 7 | Normal-type | Chatot | September 11, 2023 | Mizutani Megumi | |
| 8 | Ice-type | Lapras | September 12, 2023 | kantaro | |
| 9 | Rock-type | Aurorus | September 13, 2023 | Mizutani Megumi | |
| 10 | Ground-type | Flygon | September 14, 2023 | kannnu | |
| 11 | Flying-type | Altaria | September 15, 2023 | kannnu | |
| 12 | Fairy-type | Jigglypuff | September 19, 2023 | Mizutani Megumi | |
| 13 | Bug-type | Kricketune | September 20, 2023 | Mizutani Megumi | |
| 14 | Poison-type | Toxtricity (Amped) | September 21, 2023 | kantaro | |
| 15 | Ghost-type | Mismagius | September 22, 2023 | take | |
| 16 | Dark-type | Obstagoon | September 25, 2023 | Koda Kazuma (from Lownine) | |
| 17 | Steel-type | Jirachi | September 26, 2023 | Mizutani Megumi | |
| 18 | Fighting-type | Sirfetch'd | September 27, 2023 | take | |
| 19 | Dragon-type | Miraidon | September 28, 2023 | Ohmura Yusuke; Ariga Hitoshi | |
| 20 | With the Sea (featuring KAITO) | Greninja; Brionne | October 27, 2023 | iXima | |
| 21 | Halloween (featuring Kagamine Rin) | Gourgeist; Pumpkaboo; Morpeko | October 31, 2023 | CHIHO | |
| 22 | Anniversary (featuring MEIKO) | Oricorio; Jynx | November 5, 2023 | BUZZ | |
| 23 | Feelings and Emotions | | November 10, 2023 | Mochizuki Kei | |
| 24 | Sun and Moon (featuring Kagamine Rin, Kagamine Len) | | November 17, 2023 | Nazyo | |
| 25 | Oh, Clattering | | November 24, 2023 | Nazyo | |
| 26 | Blueberry School | Meowscarada; Skeledirge; Quaquaval | December 14, 2023 | Matsuno Tika | |
| 27 | Christmas | | December 25, 2023 | Kurumitsu | |
| 28 | Relic Song (featuring Rosa from Pokémon Black 2 and White 2) | | December 26, 2023 | kirisAki | |
| 29 | Anniversary (featuring Kagamine Rin, Kagamine Len) | Revavroom; Oricorio; Plusle; Minun | December 27, 2023 | Rico Chie | |
| 30 | New Year's Eve | Spiritomb; Bronzong; Galarian Meowth | December 31, 2023 | fuzichoco | |
| 31 | New Year | Kommo-o | January 8, 2024 (Note: Due to the 2024 Noto earthquake, the illustration was delayed from its initial release date of January 1, 2024.) | LAM | |
| 32 | Boss's Voice | | January 25, 2024 | Nanahara Sie | |
| 33 | Anniversary (featuring Megurine Luka) | | January 30, 2024 | Mogelatte | |
| 34 | Winter's Festival (featuring Snow Miku) | | February 10, 2024 | sanpati | |
| 35 | Anniversary (featuring KAITO) | | February 17, 2024 | heiwa | |
| 36 | Sleep On Belly | | February 22, 2024 | nao | |
| 37 | Flame Season (featuring MEIKO) | | March 5, 2024 | magodesu | |
| 38 | Let's Take a Picture | | March 6, 2024 | boota | |
| 39 | Chemical Street | | March 7, 2024 | wogura | |
| 40 | Sparkle | | March 8, 2024 | Nitanda Cona | |
| 41 | Ending art | | March 9, 2024 | Rella | |
| 42 | Sakura Cheering | | April 12, 2024 | Yutaka | |
| 43 | A Walk In The Sky | | May 7, 2024 | Hanekoto | |
| 44 | 18 / Voltage | | May 8, 2024 | Kiya Machi | |
| 45 | Many Signs (featuring Kagamine Rin) | | May 9, 2024 | Posuka Demizu | |
| 46 | Fun Fun Trip | Dragonite | August 16, 2024 | Chris | |
| 47 | — | Various | August 31, 2024 | KEI | |
| 48 | Anniversary (featuring Miku and MEIKO) | | November 6, 2024 | Apapico | |
| 49 | Sky Town | | December 20, 2024 | Horiizumi Inco | |
| 50 | Anniversary (featuring Kagamine Rin/Len) | | December 27, 2024 | NEGI | |
| 51 | Snake Glare | | January 1, 2025 | Akiakane | |
| 52 | Anniversary | | January 30, 2025 | Kei Sakuragi | |
| 53 | Sparkling Snow Material | | February 8, 2025 | Chamooi | |
| 54 | Anniversary | | February 17, 2025 | Suzu Yuki | |
| 55 | Pokémon Day | | February 27, 2025 | Lleftt | |
| 56 | 39!! | | March 9, 2025 | Honwa | |
| 57 | April Fools' (featuring Kasane Teto) | | April 1, 2025 | KEI | |
| 58 | Live! | | August 30, 2025 | take | |
