= Deco*27 =

Japanese musician (born 1986)

DECO*27
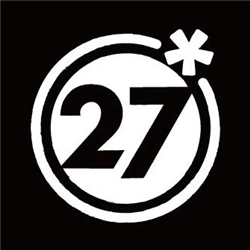

Background information
- Born: Fukuoka, Japan
- Genres: J-pop; rock; electronic
- Occupations: Songwriter, record producer
- Instruments: Vocaloid; guitar; vocals
- Years active: 2008–present
- Labels: U/M/A/A; NBCUniversal Japan; Otoiro
- Member of: Galaxias, LOVE LASTS FOREVER
- Website: otoiro.co.jp

YouTube information
- Channel: DECO*27
- Genre: Music
- Subscribers: 2.89 million
- Views: 1.75 billion
- Last updated: September 8, 2026

Deco*27 (stylized in all caps; pronounced Deko Niina), is a Japanese musician, Vocaloid producer, and songwriter. He is considered to be one of the most influential Vocaloid producers of the early 2010s, along with Wowaka and Kenshi Yonezu (Hachi).

== Early life ==
Deco*27 was raised in Fukuoka, Japan. At age 13, he taught himself how to play the guitar, a choice that was inspired by his father, who would sing and play guitar for him as a child. In high school, he joined a band. When he was a college student, he discovered the video sharing platform Nico Nico Douga and was impressed by Vocaloid music when he saw a music video of a Livetune song. He then began to study DTM (desktop music) to make Vocaloid songs.

== Career ==
=== 2008–2012: Career beginnings and breakthrough ===
In 2008, Deco*27 debuted as a Vocaloid producer. His stage name was a fusion of the Japanese word for forehead, "Deco", and his favorite numbers. He later added an asterisk. On May 17, 2009, he released his first self-produced doujin album. In July 2009, he released the music video for "Love Words," in which he expressed his gratitude and appreciation for his listeners. "Love Words" was included on his debut album Sou Ai Sei Ri Ron. This album debuted at number 42 on the Oricon Albums Chart, and became his first entry on the chart. He later released more "Love Words" sequels with the same concept, with "Love Words V" being the latest, released on February 12, 2026.

On April 14, 2010, Deco*27 released "Yowamushi Mont Blanc" featuring GUMI. The song was viewed over 1 million times on Nico Nico Douga within 5 months of its release. A light novel adaptation was released on March 26, 2016. The song was used in a video trend that combined the song with images of Hiroyuki Nishimura and the phrase "I ain't got no data." The trend became an Internet meme in 2022. He released a remake of the song on April 15, 2025 to commemorate its 15th anniversary.

Deco*27 released "Mozaik Role" on Jule 15, 2010. The song was covered by many utaites and had a strong influence on early utaite culture. It has about 12 million views on Nico Nico Douga as of July 2023, making it his most-played song, and is the sixth most viewed Vocaloid song on that platform as of September 2024. The popularity of this song would also additionally contribute to GUMI experiencing an increase in sales. The song's remake was released 10 years after its initial release.

On November 25, 2010, Deco*27 released "Mukashi Mukashi no Kyou no Boku" as the theme song for Syukan Hajimete no Hatsune Miku. On December 1, 2010, "Aimai Elegy" featuring Marina was released. Two weeks later, a studio album of the same name as the song was released. It debuted at number 11 on the Oricon Albums Chart.

In 2011, Deco*27 formed a band Galaxias! with Ko Shibasaki and TeddyLoid. Their debut album was released on November 23 of that year. In the same year he formed another band, LOVE LASTS FOREVER, with Mai, Hiro and Alex.

On July 27, 2011, Deco*27 released the debut non-Vocaloid single "Light Lag" featuring Topi. Four months later, he released the single "Egomama/Love Distance Long Affair". These served as singles for his third studio album, Love Calendar, released on July 25, 2012. This was his first album without Vocaloid and featured guest appearances by Shoko Nakagawa and Aoi Yūki. A manga based on this album was serialized in Monthly BIG GANGAN from 2012 to 2013.

=== 2013–2015: Return to Vocaloid ===
In June 2013, Deco*27 considered quitting his music career because he had done everything he wanted to do. However, when he participated in a festival Sónar, he was reminded of the quality of Vocaloid music, and when he saw his song being played and enjoyed at Hatsune Miku Magical Mirai 2013 in Yokohama, he realized that his music was being enjoyed by many people, rejuvenating his desire to continue creating Vocaloid music. Consequently, he changed the concept of his compilation album Deco*27 Vocaloid Collection 2008~2012, which was to be released on December 18, 2013, from "goodbye" to "hello from now on".

On September 7, 2013, Deco*27 released "Mousou Zei". This was the first Vocaloid song he had written in a year and eight months. It depicted the way he came to resume his Vocaloid activities. He then released one song a month for nine months. His fourth studio album, Conti New, which included these songs, was released on March 26, 2014. All songs were written using Hatsune Miku.

Deco*27 was a co-writer on the Shoko Nakagawa single "Choberi Good Time", released in October 2015.

=== 2016–2017: Ghost Rule ===
On January 8, 2016, Deco*27 released "Ghost Rule", which is regarded as one of the most important songs of the Vocaloid industry in the late 2010s. It has about 11 million views on Nico Nico Douga as of September 2024, making it his second most-played song, and it is the tenth most viewed Vocaloid song on that platform as of same time. With this achievement, he became the first producer to have multiple Vocaloid songs with over 10 million views on the Nico Nico Douga platform. Additionally, it has garnered approximately 56 million views on YouTube as of June 2026. He stated that with "Ghost Rule"'s popularity, he "hoped that people of the new generation would become aware of Vocaloid's culture, and produce more and more works."

On September 22, 2016, he released his fifth studio album Ghost, which also included "Ghost Rule". This album became his first entry on the Billboard Japan Hot Albums. The title of the album is a reference to death and reincarnation. The sound of this album is loud rock with elements of hip hop. The single "Delusional Sentimental Compensation Federation" from the album was released on November 18, 2016. The music video for the song had about 66 million views on YouTube as of June 2026, making it the most viewed song on the album and the fifth most viewed song on his YouTube channel.

In 2017, Deco*27 released "Hibana". The song was the first to be arranged by Rockwell. It was written to contribute to the album HATSUNE MIKU 10th Anniversary Album Re:Start. It has about 10 million views on Nico Nico Douga as of September 2024. It placed first in the Netolabo-compiled 2021 ranking of his most popular songs.

=== 2018–2020: Android Girl, Milgram and Undead Alice ===
On January 18, 2019, Deco*27 released "Otome Dissection". This song is considered one of the best examples of slow-tempo Vocaloid songs from the late 2010s. It attracted attention for its focus on themes of murder and suicide. The single featured on his sixth studio album Android Girl, released on May 22, 2019. Rockwell arranged all of the songs on this album. The album reached number eight on both the Billboard Japan Hot Albums and Oricon Albums Charts, his first Top 10 entry and biggest hit.

On April 17, 2020, the first video was uploaded to the YouTube channel Milgram, announcing the start of an interactive music project by Deco*27 and Takuya Yamanaka. Deco*27 also announced it on his Twitter account. Deco*27 released a Hatsune Miku cover of the song "Undercover", the first song of the Milgram project, on his own YouTube channel on April 27, 2021.

On December 16, 2020, Deco*27 released Undead Alice. This album was revealed to be the last in a trilogy of albums, following Ghost and Android Girl. The common concept of these albums is "becoming human".

=== 2021–2023: Mannequin ===
On March 9, 2021, Deco*27 released "The Vampire", his first dance-pop song. It went viral on TikTok. The music video for the song had about 82 million views on YouTube as of August 2024, and it was the most viewed song on his YouTube channel until it was surpassed by Rabbit Hole in April 2025. The song uses vampires as a metaphor for hidden love.

Deco*27 released "Salamander" on January 8, 2022, as part of a collaboration between Hatsune Miku: Colorful Stage! and Cup Noodles. The song incorporates new techniques such as Latin rock, which was described as "a subversion of the formulaic hit style".

On March 9, 2022, Deco*27 released his eighth studio album Mannequin. The concept of this album is "all idols are Hatsune Miku", and each song has its own Hatsune Miku concept.

=== 2023–present: Continued success ===
On January 14, 2023, Deco*27 released the song "(Not) A Devil" in collabaration with PinocchioP. The two each used a different voicebank of Hatsune Miku. It became the number one single on Billboard Japan's newly-instituted Niconico Vocaloid Songs Top 20 singles chart, and became both Deco*27's and PinocchioP's first number-one song. It ranked as the 12th best-performing song of the year on the year-end chart of 2023.

On May 19, 2023, Deco*27 released "Rabbit Hole". This song became a sleeper hit, and received considerable renewed attention in 2024 when Hatsune Miku artist and animator Channelcaststation uploaded a "Rabbit Hole" animation on February 17, 2024 titled "Pure Pure". As of September 2024, it had over eighty five million views on YouTube. The song then reached number five in Global Japan Songs excl. Japan for the week of April 2, 2024. It has been streamed over 40 million times on Spotify as of September 11, 2024.

To celebrate the 16th anniversary of Hatsune Miku's release, Deco*27 released "Blue Planet" on August 31, 2023. The song debuted at number one on Niconico Vocaloid Songs Top 20 and becoming his second number one song.

On 29 September 2023, Deco*27 released the single "Volt Tackle". It was the first song released from "Pokemon feat. Hatsune Miku Project VOLTAGE 18 Types/Songs", a collaborative project between the Japanese media franchise Pokémon and Hatsune Miku.

On 30 August 2024, Deco*27 announced a 9th album, titled Transform, which was released on 27 November 2024. The album is composed of 2 discs, with disc 1 composed of mostly new songs and newer singles and disc 2 composed of singles released after "Mannequin" in 2022 and until the end of 2023.

In 2025, Hatsune Miku: Colorful Stage! partnered with Deco*27 again to compose six unit songs for their movie Colorful Stage! The Movie: A Miku Who Can't Sing. Six other artists, consisting of Giga, NILFRUITS, Iyowa, Surii, kemu and tepe were also asked to arrange each song, Fire Dance, Smile*Symphony, FUN!!, The Light That Dwells Here, SToRY, and Hello, SEKAI respectively.

On May 2026, Deco*27 released the single "Love Para", described by Ototoy as a dance-rock song with a "reimagination of Eurobeat and Para Para".

== Artistry ==
Early in his career, Deco*27's sound was described as rock-based, flexibly absorbing folk and electronic music. His rock style is influenced by Blink-182, Sum 41, Green Day, and others. Later on in his career, his music became a combination of rock, hyperpop and Shibuya-kei because of the influence of his collaborator, Japanese songwriter Rockwell.

Most of Deco*27's music contains themes of love for parents, friends and lovers. He is also known for his frequent use of sexually explicit lyrics. This is especially evident in "Animal", which focuses on a girl with a voracious sexual appetite. When "Sad Girl Sex" was released in 2024, its sexual lyrics and title caused some controversy. His lyric style is influenced by Chiharu Matsuyama, 19, Yuzu, and Bump of Chicken.

== Business ventures ==
=== Otoiro ===
Deco*27 started his creative studio, Otoiro, under NBCUniversal Entertainment Japan. This was caused by the termination of his contract with U/M/A/A. Akka became the first artist signed to the new studio. Four months after its establishment, more than ten creators had signed on. The name "Otoiro" is taken from the Japanese words "oto" (音) for melodies and "iro" (色) for colors.

=== Holo*27 ===
Holo*27 is a musical project between Deco*27 and virtual YouTuber agency Hololive. He has been providing music to Hololive since about 2021, and Holo*27 was established as an extension of his work. Holo*27 Originals Vol.1 was released on March 15, 2023. The album features Usada Pekora, Hoshimachi Suisei, Gawr Gura, and others. It debuted at number four on the Billboard Japan Hot Albums, and Holo*27 Covers Vol.1, released on the same day, also debuted at number six on that chart. A concert for the project, "holo*27 stage", was held on March 19, 2023 as part of Hololive's annual expo and full-cast concert series.

== Discography ==
=== Studio albums ===
List of studio albums
Title	Details	Peak chart positions	
Title	Details	JPN Hot	JPN
Sou Ai Sei Ri Ron	Release date: April 21, 2010; Label: U/M/A/A; Format: CD, digital download, streaming	—	42
Aimai Elegy	Release date: December 15, 2010; Label: U/M/A/A; Format: CD, digital download, streaming	—	11
Love Calender	Released: July 15, 2012; Label: U/M/A/A; Format: CD, digital download, streaming	—	27
Conti New	Released: March 26, 2014; Label: U/M/A/A; Format: CD, digital download, streaming	—	44
Ghost	Released: September 28, 2016; Label: U/M/A/A; Format: CD, digital download, streaming	21	22
Android Girl	Released: September 22, 2019; Label: NBCUniversal Entertainment Japan; Format: CD, digital download, streaming	8	8
Undead Alice	Released: December 16, 2020; Label: NBCUniversal Entertainment Japan; Format: CD, digital download, streaming	22	22
Mannequin	Released: March 9, 2022; Label: NBCUniversal Entertainment Japan; Format: CD, digital download, streaming	10	9
Transform	Released: November 27, 2024; Label: NBCUniversal Entertainment Japan; Format: CD, digital download, streaming	35	29
"—" denotes releases that did not chart

=== Mixtapes ===
List of mixtapes
Title	Details
So I	Release date: May 17, 2009; Label: Self-released; Format: CD
No You, No Me	Release date: September 6, 2009; Label: Self-released; Format: CD
Lovegazer	Released: December 30, 2009; Label: Self-released; Format: CD
Palovrel World	Released: July 19, 2010; Label: Self-released; Format: CD

=== Compilation albums ===
Title	Details	Peak chart positions
Title	Details	JPN
Deco*27 Vocaloid Collection 2008~2012	Release date: December 18, 2013; Label: U/M/A/A; Format: CD, digital download, streaming	28

=== Singles ===
Title	Year	Album
"Light Lag"	2011	Love Calender
"Egomama/Love Distance Long Affair"	2011	Love Calender
"Yumeyume"	2012	Deco*27 Vocaloid Collection 2008~2012
"Choberi Good Time" (with Shoko Nakagawa)	2015	Mugen Blanc/Noir
"39" (with Sasakure.UK, featuring Hatsune Miku)	2018	Non-album single
"Theory of Negativity"	2020	Undead Alice
"Positive Parade"	2020	Undead Alice
"Undead Alice"	2020	Undead Alice
"Neo-Neon"	2020	Undead Alice
"Heart Impulse" (featuring Kurokumo)	2020	Non-album single
"The Vampire"	2021	Mannequin
"needLe"	2021	Non-album single
"Sekai" (with Shota Horie)	2021	Non-album single
"Undercover"	2021	Non-album single
"Stickybug II"	2021	Mannequin
"Cinderella"	2021	Mannequin
"Mozaik Role (Reloaded)"	2021	Mannequin
"Rhythm"	2021	Non-album single
"Animal"	2021	Mannequin
"Salamander"	2022	Transform
"Parasite"	2022	Mannequin
"Chimera"	2022	Transform
"Love Words IV"	2022	Transform
"Zombies"	2022	Transform
"Journey"	2022	Non-album single
"Poison Apple"	2022	Transform
"(Not) A Devil" (with PinocchioP)	2023	Non-album single
"Mannequin"	2023	Transform
"Rabbit Hole"	2023	Transform
"Cosmic Rendezvous"	2023	Transform
"Blue Planet"'	2023	Transform
"Volt Tackle"	2023	Transform
"Rookie"	2024	Transform
"Aitai-lians"	2024	Transform
"Hao"	2024	Transform
"Sad Girl Sex"	2024	Transform
"Neverland"	2024	Transform
"Monitoring"	2024	Transform
"Crime and Punishment (Reloaded)"	2025	Non-album single
"Hello, SEKAI!" (with tepe)	2025	Colorful Stage! The Movie: A Miku Who Can't Sing Movie Soundtrack
"SToRY" (with Shota Horie)	2025	Colorful Stage! The Movie: A Miku Who Can't Sing Movie Soundtrack
"FUN!!" (with Iyowa)	2025	Colorful Stage! The Movie: A Miku Who Can't Sing Movie Soundtrack
"Fire Dance" (with Giga)	2025	Colorful Stage! The Movie: A Miku Who Can't Sing Movie Soundtrack
"Smile*Symphony" (with Niru Kajitsu)	2025	Colorful Stage! The Movie: A Miku Who Can't Sing Movie Soundtrack
"The Light That Dwells Here" (with Three)	2025	Colorful Stage! The Movie: A Miku Who Can't Sing Movie Soundtrack
"Fusion"	2025	Non-album single
"Telepathy"	2025	Mixture Pop
"Yowamushi Mont Blanc (Reloaded)"	2025	Mixture Pop
"Cherry Pop"	2025	Mixture Pop
"Monitoring (Best Friend Remix)"	2025	Mixture Pop
"Marshmallow"	2025	Mixture Pop
"Stuckmoth"	2025	Mixture Pop
"Aimai Elegy (Reloaded)"	2025	Non-album single
"Love Words V"	2026	Mixture Pop
"Love Para"	2026	Mixture Pop
"Dummy Romance"	2026	Mixture Pop
"BRAINWASHED"	2026	Mixture Pop

=== Other charted songs ===
Title	Year	Peak chart positions	Album
Title	Year	JPN Hot	Album
"Love Words III"	2018	58	Android Girl
