= Kyu-Kurarin =

Single by Iyowa

from the album Watashi no Heritage
- Language: Japanese
- Released: September 4, 2021
- Genre: J-pop; Vocaloid music
- Length: 3:37 (single version); 3:34 (album version)
- Label: Self-released
- Songwriter: Iyowa
- Producer: Iyowa

Iyowa singles chronology
"Adipocere" (2021)	"Kyu-Kurarin" (2021)	"We Are Special" (2021)

Music video
- "Kyu-kurarin" on YouTube

"Kyu-Kurarin" (きゅうくらりん; sometimes stylized as "Kyu-kurarin") is a song by Japanese Vocaloid producer Iyowa. The song was first released on both YouTube and Nico Nico Douga on August 29, 2021, and released as a single on September 4, 2021. On December 22, it was included in the album Watashi no Heritage.

The composition, lyrics, illustrations, and music video were created by Iyowa, and he made the vocals using CeVIO voicebank KAFU. The composition contains experimental sounds, described as "chaotic" despite its "simple" and "powerful" chord progression, and "pop" and "catchy" melody. The lyrics, whose main theme is described as a broken heart or one-sided love, are characterized as uneasy. The song is considered one of Iyowa's signature songs. Several fan works have been inspired by this song, and it is included on soundtracks for a number of music games.

== Production and release ==
The song "Kyu-Kurarin" incorporates a synthetic voice package named "Kafu", which was released on July 7, 2021, and based on the virtual singer Kaf. Shortly after the launch of the package, Japanese producer Iyowa released "Kyu-Kurarin". In a 2024 interview, he stated, "It's like the feeling of a child who has just received a new toy, wanting to get hold of it as soon as possible", and he tried to capture the fresh impression he got from the voice while it was still vivid. He also stated that the song was influenced by "Sotsu Omeshiki (そつおめしき)", a soundtrack for the video game Taiko no Tatsujin.

On 29 August 2021, Iyowa released the song on both YouTube and Nico Nico Douga, and on 4 September released it on the music streaming service. On December 22, it was included on the album Watashi no Heritage.

== Composition ==
"Kyu-Kurarin" is categorized as J-pop or vocaloid music. Its chord progression is described as "simple" and "powerful", while the melody is characterized as "pop music", and "catchy". Jin Sugiyama from Real Sound states that the atmosphere of this song is created to take advantage of Kafu's voice, "which has a natural fluctuation." Additionally, the song's sound is richly layered, and the rhythm is not quantized. As a first impression, Genko from Eureka highlights the song's "grainy sound quality, like a meme image that has been incessantly reposted, as if it had been irreversibly degraded to a 64kbps.mp3."

The writer Flat of Eureka argues that the synthesizer featured in the intro, which "probably uses a chorus-like effect to excessively bend the pitch", is one of the characteristic elements of Iyowa's music. Tadahiko Yokogawa, in addition to the synthesizer, points out prominent elements such as the live piano, frequent use of reversed audio, and modulation, concluding that the song "is packed with the characteristics of Iyowa". Satoru Wono draws attention towards the continuously playing, intricate xylophone-like sounds, which he thinks can "only achievable through programming", and also highlights the excessive amount of information per unit of time, which is one of Iyowa's characteristics. Shiori Ni Fit Suru Kado from Eureka feels that the reversed audio both marimba and the wavering synthesizer chords create an effect that "evokes a sense of unease amidst cheerfulness". He praises the song as "a zenith of Iyowa's songwriting, where catchiness and weirdness coexist". Regarding the dissonance used in the song, the musician Toidora points out that the song's chords "deliberately play notes that should not be played together."

Shiori Ni Fit Suru Kado assesses that the drums have a light timbre maintaining drum-and-bass-like rhythm, and argues that they emphasize "the eerie atmosphere of the kicks, played in sixteenth-note clusters, implying a sense of unease amidst the briskness." Namahoge from Eureka thinks the drums imitate the sound of an alarm clock. He argues that the sound skilfully resets the "half-time progression with a sudden single beat of silence", concluding that these elements depicting "the moment when one is forcibly torn from a dream" intervene in the narrative time of the song. According to Genko, its "collapsed, but not entirely" tonality and rhythm add a complex flavor to what would otherwise be a simple chord progression. This structure, they argue, evokes a sense of "irretrievably falling apart with each alarm ring".

== Music video and lyrics ==
A frame from the music video of "Kyu-Kurarin", where a girl named "Kurari-chan" falls from above and slides to the left, overlapping and forming a chain.

Iyowa also wrote the lyrics and created the illustrations for the music video. Before the lyrics start, "a girl dressed like a schoolgirl and an alarm clock appear". The lyrics refer to the girl as "I (わたし, watashi)", but the character sheet named her "Kurari-chan (くらりちゃん)". Her hairstyle is inwardly curled with a slightly messy bedhead, wearing three pink ribbons-like hair clips placed on the right side and three flower-shaped ones on the left. According to the aesthetician Yuki Namba, Kurari-chan is portrayed as "a character who sings about her restless and wandering mind that goes back and forth between hope and despair in a one-sided love", and she acts in a way that embodies the qualities of the song's sound, characterized by its "displacement, delay, and muddiness".

Many fan works quote and pay homage to the scene where multiple versions of the girl drop from above and slide to the left, overlapping and making a chain. Shoma Yonehara from Eureka describes it as "the most memorable scene in the video". She is featured across seven illustrations—depicted eating a slice of bread, checking the time, running, and wiping sweat from her forehead. However, since there is a certain time interval between each pose, hardly any continuity in her actions can be observed. According to Yonehara, this sequence draws the viewer's attention not so much to the character's poses themselves but to "the easing and spring effect of the fall." He argues that this technical simplicity encourages the creation of fan works. Namba states that this scene emphasizes not only "the persona of the character in a hurry" but also "the persona of the chaotic song". Furthermore, a similar sequence in the chorus, "perfectly synchronizes with the rhythm of the song, expressing the hurried and arrhythmic emotions of a character in love."

Moreover, Namba thinks that in the video, the "interaction between the voice, animation, sound, direction, images and editing" expresses the emotional instability of "Kurari-chan". This kind of direction has the effect of making the viewer want to know more about the character's feelings and encouraging them to "interpretation" of the situation. The singer Kokoa Ando highlighted the narrative quality that rewards the deeper analysis of the lyrics. Some fans believe that Iyowa wrote this song while inspired by Sayori from the visual novel Doki Doki Literature Club!.

Sakiko Kawano argues that the song initially gives an impression of being a heartwarming love song, with the mimetic word "kyu-kurarin (きゅうくらりん)" mentioned in the lyrics seeming to imply the girl's passion for "you (あなた, anata)". However, as the song progresses, the word gradually shifts to other forms such as gyu-gurarin (ぎゅうぐらりん), and "by the song's conclusion, this word, while retaining a similar sound, transforms into one suggesting hanging (chu-burarin)." She notes that its lyrics, much of which are camouflaged by a cheerful singing style, eventually reveal themselves to be about the emptiness plaguing the girl, which in turn creates a sense of emptiness in the gaze of the listener when noticing the irony between the two opposites.

The Japanese word chu-burarin (宙ぶらりん) itself refers to "hanging in mid-air" or "being in a halfway or incomplete state". Yutorina from UtaTen argues that the song as a whole is about her broken heart, and that the word chu-burarin expresses the girl's feelings of hanging on to the person she loves.

== Reception ==
"Kyu-Kurarin" received critical acclaim from a number of music critics. It is considered one of Iyowa's signature songs or one of his biggest hits. Namahoge described the song as "Iyowa's glitch magnum opus", and praised the way the it expresses time through music, including the sound of the alarm clock and its divergence from dreams. Flat also evaluates the song positively, highlighting how these "dissonant ornaments" are unified by "the catchy melody and powerful chord progression," maintaining "a sense of order as pop music." Sugiyama appreciates the experimental sounds used in the song, such as the "hurly xylophone, dissonances, spacey synth, and reverse-audio-like effects," noting that they harmonize well with the lyrics. According to Kawano, the song has become "the most popular track" on the album Watashi no Heritage.

On September 5, 2021, it surpassed 100,000 views on Nico Nico Douga. On YouTube, it had over 10,000,000 views by June 19, 2022 and exceeded 80,000,000 views by May 2025. It was ranked at the top of Billboard Japan Nico Nico Vocaloid Songs Top 20 chart, which was released on 23 August 2023. Since this chart launched on 7 December 2022, the song has appeared in the chart for most weeks in 2021–24. It also reached on number 7 of the Billboard JAPAN Heatseekers Songs.

=== Cover songs ===
A number of the "Kyu-Kurarin" cover versions (utattemita) have been released, including a cover by Chogakusei, which was digitally released on August 17, 2022. The song has been covered by a number of VTubers. The Vtuber Makaino Ririmu has mentioned "Kyu-Kurarin" as a song she often listens when feeling down.

=== Games ===
On January 12, 2023, the song was added to Chunithm, an arcade game developed by Sega, and on July 3 it was included in Sega's rhythm game Hatsune Miku: Colorful Stage!. On March 21, 2024, a full-size "2D music video" of "Kyu-Kurarin / MORE MORE JUMP! × MEIKO" was released on the game's official YouTube channel, created by Iyowa himself. On March 13, 2024, the song was added to Bandai Namco Amusement's arcade game Taiko no Tatsujin alongside Ado's song "Show" and "Halo" from Pokémon Horizons: The Series.

== Charts ==
Weekly chart performance for "Kyu-Kurarin"
Chart (2023)	Peak position
Heatseekers Songs (Billboard Japan)	7
