= Android Girl =

Studio album by Deco*27
- Released: May 22, 2019
- Genres: J-pop; punk rock
- Length: 37:20
- Label: NBCUEJ
- Producers: Deco*27; Rockwell; Emon

Deco*27 chronology
Ghost (2016)	Android Girl (2019)	Undead Alice (2020)

Android Girl is the sixth studio album by Japanese Vocaloid producer Deco*27. It was released on May 22, 2019, becoming his first top ten album. This album's concept is "life and death".

== Background ==
Deco*27 announced the album release on his social media accounts on March 22, 2019. The album trailer was released on May 11, 2019.

== Content ==
The album includes the promotional singles "Love Words III", "Otome Dissection", "Nocturnal Kids", "Scramble", the title track Android Girl, "We the Hostage", "Psychogram", and "The Guide", along with Hibana's re-recorded version. The special edition includes a radio drama featuring Sora Amamiya and Shintarō Asanuma. "Love Words III" debuted at number 58 on the Billboard Japan Hot 100 of the week of October 22, 2018, his first the chart entry. "Otome Dissection" music video had about 49 million views on YouTube as of September 2024. The title track music video was directed by akka and serves as a sequel to "Two Breaths Walking" which he also directed.

== Commercial performance ==
Android Girl debuted at number 8 on the Oricon Albums Chart and Billboard Japan Hot Albums, becoming his first top ten album.

== Track listing ==
All tracks are written by Deco*27 and Rockwell.

Android Girl track listing
No.	Title	Length
1.	"Reunion"	0:37
2.	"Android Girl"	3:30
3.	"Scramble"	3:03
4.	"Mosquito"	3:49
5.	"Otome Dissection"	3:43
6.	"We the Hostage"	3:06
7.	"The Guide"	4:17
8.	"Psychogram"	3:44
9.	"Nocturnal Kids"	3:55
10.	"Hibana (Reloaded)"	3:26
11.	"Love Words III"	4:06
Total length:		37:20

Special edition
No.	Title	Vocal(s)	Length
12.	"MKDR (DSCF)"	Sora Amamiya; Shintarō Asanuma	38:54
Total length:			76:14

== Charts ==
Chart (2019)	Peak position
Japanese Albums (Oricon)	8
Japanese Hot Albums (Billboard Japan)	8
