= Anticyclone (album) =

Studio album by Inabakumori
- Released: November 17, 2019
- Genres: Alternative rock; electronic rock; J-pop
- Length: 48:40
- Language: Japanese
- Labels: U&R
- Producer: Inabakumori

Inabakumori chronology
Anticyclone (2019)	Weather Station (2022)

Anticyclone (stylized in all caps, Japanese: アンチサイクロン) is the debut studio album by Japanese Vocaloid producer Inabakumori. It was released on November 17, 2019, and it was eventually released onto streaming platforms on November 11, 2020. The album's cover art was designed by Japanese illustrator Nukunuku Nigirimeshi.

== Background ==
Inabakumori suggested in November 2018 that it would release his debut studio album in 2019. On October 24, 2019, he announced the album release on his Twitter account. It was initially sold only at the Japanese doujinshi convention The Vocaloid Master, but was later officially released.

== Content ==
With the exception of "The Stars Get Dark" and "Billow of Fireworks", all songs on the album had previously been released as singles. Most of the songs on the album featured vocals by Kaai Yuki, with the song "Non-Use" additionally featuring Hatsune Miku.

The second track on the album, "Lost Umbrella", was first released on Nico Nico Douga on February 27, 2018, and has become Inabakumori's best known song. In the first half of 2024, it ranked as the third most played Vocaloid song outside of Japan.

== Track listing ==
All tracks are written by Inabakumori.

Anticyclone track listing
No.	Title	Length
1.	"Anticyclone" (アンチサイクロン)	3:13
2.	"Lost Umbrella" (ロストアンブレラン)	3:22
3.	"Pascal Beats" (パスカルビーツ)	3:20
4.	"Cooler Girl" (クーラーガール)	3:48
5.	"Loop Spinner" (ループスピナ)	3:54
6.	"Tears Radar" (ナミダ電波)	3:25
7.	"An Image in the Making" (ツクリカケノ心象)	3:25
8.	"Floating Moonlight City" (浮遊月光街)	3:35
9.	"The Stars Get Dark" (絶体暗星)	3:45
10.	"Billow of Fireworks" (渦巻ハナビ)	3:00
11.	"Copy And Pastime" (うつしあそび)	3:54
12.	"Sakasama Girl Feeling" (さかさま少女感)	3:26
13.	"Non-Use" (ノンユース)	3:32
14.	"Secret Music" (秘密音楽)	3:00
Total length:		48:40
