= Iyowa =

Japanese musician and Vocaloid producer

Iyowa いよわ
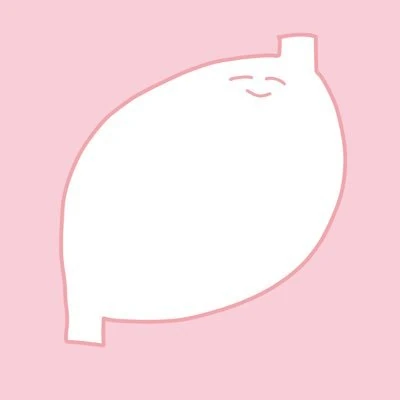

Background information
- Born: September 23, 2000 (age 26)
- Origin: Japan
- Genres: J-pop; electronic; indie rock; psychedelic pop
- Occupations: Songwriter, record producer, illustrator
- Instruments: Vocaloid; keyboard
- Years active: 2018–present
- Label: Igusuri Records
- Member of: Studio Gohan

Iyowa (Japanese: いよわ) is a Japanese musician, Vocaloid producer, songwriter and illustrator. He is best known for his 2021 single "Kyu-Kurarin", which has been viewed over 100 million times on YouTube. His artist name came about from having a weak stomach.

== Career ==
Iyowa began composing music in elementary school using the Nintendo DS software Jam with the Band. He became interested in Vocaloid music when he was in junior high school, when he discovered Jin's song Children Record.

In 2018, Iyowa debuted as a Vocaloid producer, submitting his music to Nico Nico Douga. Iyowa then released his debut album Sleeping Pink Noise on November 17, 2019. The album was initially released only on CD, but later released on streaming formats. The following year, on June 8, 2020, Iyowa released "Clover Knight" as his debut single on his own label, Igusuri Records.

On September 4, 2021, Iyowa released "Kyu-Kurarin". This song's music video gained 100,000 views on Nico Nico Douga one week after its release, and 10 million views on YouTube by June 19, 2022. This song reached number one on the Niconico Vocaloid Songs Top 20. It is the longest charting song on the chart, and is still charting as of July, 2024. The song has lyrics that allude to depression and suicide, and many users have discussed the meaning of the lyrics. It was a single from Watashi no Heritage released in December of the same year. This album debuted at number 50 on the Billboard Japan Hot Albums, and became his first entry on the chart.

On October 22, 2022, Iyowa released a song titled "Heat Abnormal" featuring the UTAU voicebank Adachi Rei, which was number one in The VOCALOID Collection 2022 Autumn. Later, on December 7, 2022, Iyowa's song "Leave You on the Back of the Earth" featuring RIME became the number one single on Billboard Japan's newly instituted Niconico Vocaloid Songs Top 20 singles chart. Six months later, "The Peachy Key" reached number one, making Iyowa the artist with the most number one songs on the chart.

In January 2023, Iyowa was featured on the song "Droplet" from Japanese voice actress and singer Mai Fuchigami's EP Mai Create. That year, he produced "Zanshi", a song from another voice actress and singer Saori Hayami's third studio album, Shiro to Hanataba. The following year, on February 27, 2024, Iyowa released the single "Journey's Prequels, Journey's Traces" featuring virtual singer Hatsune Miku. The song was created for "Pokemon feat. Hatsune Miku Project VOLTAGE 18 Types/Songs", a collaborative project between the Japanese media franchise Pokémon and Hatsune Miku.

Iyowa released his third album, Films, Sunny Spots, Graduations on June 26, 2024. It reached number nine on both Oricon Albums Chart and Japan Hot Albums, becoming his first album to enter the top 10 on the Oricon charts.

== Artistry ==
Iyowa's songs are known for making heavy use of dissonance, and are often described as emotionally charged. The abrupt jumps in scale and the abundance of dissonance led to his early career to be described as "that sounds like it was written at random, but it is a song and it is mutant". In 2022, he described his musical style as "Strong characteristic and strange music".

Vocaloid music videos are generally commissioned from a different person than the composer, but Iyowa produces all of his own music videos and his songs. He attributed this to the reason: "I was afraid to have a music video produced by someone I had never met before." The girls in his music video are called "Iyowa girls", and he said he is very happy to see their fan art.

=== Inspiration ===
Iyowa has cited Harumaki Gohan, Nuyuri, and Enon Kawatani of Gesu no Kiwami Otome as major musical influences. In particular, Kawatani is a strong influence on Iyowa, and many of Iyowa's songs are influenced by his works. He has also stated that he is influenced by Jin's Kagerou Project, a mixed-media project.

== Personal life ==
Iyowa is a college student as of 2022. After he graduates, he plans to continue working as a producer while working another job.

== Discography ==
=== Studio albums ===
List of studio albums
Title	Details	Peak chart positions	
Title	Details	JPN Hot	JPN
Sleeping Pink Noise	Release date: November 17, 2019; Label: Self-released; Format: CD, digital download, streaming	—	—
Watashi no Heritage	Release date: December 22, 2021; Label: Igusuri Records; Format: CD, digital download, streaming	50	—
Films, Sunny Spots, Graduations	Released: June 26, 2024; Label: Igusuri Records; Format: CD, digital download, streaming	9	9
"—" denotes releases that did not chart

=== Extended plays ===
Title	Details
Dreamy Climax	Release date: June 24, 2019; Label: Self-released; Format: CD

=== Singles ===
Title	Year	Album
"Clover Knight"	2020	Watashi no Heritage
"Potpourri-san"	2020	Watashi no Heritage
"Golden Number"	2020	Watashi no Heritage
"Goodbye Jackpot"	2020	Watashi no Heritage
"Living Millennium"	2020	Watashi no Heritage
"OVER!"	2021	Watashi no Heritage
"Almost Ended"	2021	Watashi no Heritage
"Adipocere"	2021	Watashi no Heritage
"Kyu-Kurarin"	2021	Watashi no Heritage
"We Are Special"	2021	Non-album single
"Pajamy"	2022	Films, Sunny Spots, Graduations
"Phenomenon"	2022	Non-album single
"AKUMA!"	2022	Non-album single
"Primary"	2022	Films, Sunny Spots, Graduations
"Heat Abnormal" (featuring Adachi Rei)	2022	Films, Sunny Spots, Graduations
"Take You to an Alien" (featuring SEKAI)	2023	Films, Sunny Spots, Graduations
"Till Your Tear Goes"	2023	Films, Sunny Spots, Graduations
"Leave You on the Back of the Earth" (featuring RIME)	2023	Films, Sunny Spots, Graduations
"Dandelion"	2023	Films, Sunny Spots, Graduations
"Actress"	2023	Films, Sunny Spots, Graduations
"KLY"	2023	Films, Sunny Spots, Graduations
"BABEL"	2024	Films, Sunny Spots, Graduations
"The Peachy Key"	2024	Films, Sunny Spots, Graduations
"Dreaming Scales"	2024	Films, Sunny Spots, Graduations
"Journey's Prequels, Journey's Traces" (featuring Hatsune Miku)	2024	Pokémon feat. Hatsune Miku Project Voltage; 18 Types/Songs Collection
"Firefly" (with Nilfruits)	2024	Mwlánd
"Write Over Me"	2024	TBA
"Over!!"	2025	TBA
"Wasure Mono"	2025	TBA
"SLIP"	2025	TBA
"Daphnie in love"	2025	TBA
"Everything"	2025	TBA
"Last Rally"	2026	TBA
"Syzygy"	2026	TBA

=== Guest appearances ===
Track	Year	Artist(s)	Album
"Astraea's Disappointment"	2020	Guchiry	Mugenhouyou
"Octagon"	2021	Titana	Dual Nature / Impure
"Before monochrome"	2021	suisoh	Metropolis
"Cloudsurf"	2023	Yuigot	Guidebook
"Droplet"	2023	Mai Fuchigami	Mai Create

=== Production discography ===
Track(s)	Year	Credit	Artist(s)	Album
"Pinedrop"	2021	Songwriter	Sangatsu no Phantasia	101 / Yakou
"Orangescale"	2022	Songwriter, producer	Yuka Nagase	A Look Front
"Jiai wa Shitatari"	2022	Producer	SEE	Camisole
"Super Rare"	2022	Songwriter, producer	PMarusama	Love Holic
"Battle at the Big Bridge"	2022	Producer	Nobuo Uematsu	Electronica Tunes -FINAL FANTASY Series-
"Supesharoze"	2022	Songwriter, producer	Zonko	Non-album single
"Hello My Treat"	2022	Songwriter, producer	MKLNtic	Happy Life
"My Wonder"	2022	Songwriter, producer	Sangatsu no Phantasia	Golden Ray -Kaitai Shinsyou-
"Melon Soda Float"	2022	Songwriter, producer	SoundOrion	SOUND OF BES2
"Wadachi no Hana"	2023	Songwriter, producer	Minori Suzuki	Fruitful Spring
"Parallel Searchlight"	2023	Songwriter, producer	Sana Natori	NATORI SANA MUSIC COLLECTION Vol.3
"Zanshi"	2023	Songwriter, producer	Saori Hayami	Shiro to Hanataba
"Honno Kansou"	2023	Songwriter, producer	Yuka Nagase	Launchvox
"High Heels"	2023	Songwriter, producer	Sou	Sense of Wonder

=== Remixes ===
2019

- Manika – "To Azalea" (Iyowa Remix)

2020

- Kairiki Bear – "Darling Dance" (Iyowa Remix)

2021

- Hiiragi Magnetite – "Marshall Maximizer" (Iyowa Remix)
- Kaf - "Me Logic" (Iyowa Remix)

2022

- Haruka Kudo - "GROOVY MUSIC TAPE" (Iyowa Remix)
- Deco*27 – "Animal" (Iyowa Remix)
- Manika - "I'm the only one left behind in March" (Iyowa Remix)
- BCNO - "Capotasto" (Iyowa Remix)

2023

- Mikitop – "Ghost Girl" (Iyowa Remix)

2024

- Inabakumori – "Relay Outer" (Iyowa Remix)

2026

- Hachi – "Matryoshka" (Iyowa Remix)
- Siinamota – "Young girl A" (Iyowa Remix)
