= Monitoring (song) =

2024 song

Single by Deco*27 feat. Hatsune Miku

from the album Transform
- Language: Japanese
- Released: November 23, 2024
- Genre: J-pop; Vocaloid; Bass house
- Length: 2:57
- Label: OTOIRO
- Songwriter: Deco*27
- Producers: Deco*27 & Hayato Yamamoto

Deco*27 singles chronology
| "Neverland" (2024) | "Monitoring" (2024) | "Crime and Punishment" (Reloaded) (2025) |

Music video
- "Monitoring" on YouTube

"Monitoring" (モニタリング, Monitaringu) is a song by Vocaloid producer Deco*27 featuring Hatsune Miku on vocals. It was released on November 23, 2024, and was later included in the album Transform. The song is a Bass house-influenced track with inspiration from Shōwa era J-pop, produced in collaboration with Hayato Yamamoto. Lyrically, the song covers dark subject matter, portraying Miku as an obsessive stalker who stares through the peephole on the door of her victim's apartment. It was extremely successful, spawning numerous derivative works and charting at number one on Billboard Japan's 2025 Vocaloid year-end list.

On September 5, 2025, a self-remix, "Monitoring (Best Friend remix)" was released, with a lighter dance-pop sound. The remix debuted at number one on the Niconico Vocaloid Top 20 chart.

== Composition ==
"Monitoring" portrays Hatsune Miku as an obsessive stalker looking through the peephole of her victim's door. The lyrics focus on the desire for control in an unhealthy romantic relationship, possibly a one-sided one. The lyrics are also sexually provocative in nature, and leave just enough ambiguity for listeners to interpret.

Musically, the song is heavily influenced by bass house, and also takes inspiration from J-pop of the Shōwa era. The production of the track was done in collaboration with Hayato Yamamoto, who had previously worked on another song of Deco*27's, "Sad Girl Sex". The song opens with the sound effect of a doorbell ringing and someone knocking at the door.

== Release ==
"Monitoring" was released on YouTube and Niconico on November 22, 2024, alongside its music video. The digital single would release on the 23rd, at exactly midnight. The music video was animated and directed by the artist kee, who also illustrated the cover for the album Transform that "Monitoring" would later appear on. The video juxtaposes psychedelic shots of Miku peering into the peephole with more grounded, everyday shots where she looks anxious, eventually ending with the door opening.

== Reception ==
"Monitoring" was extremely successful, consistently topping Billboard Japan's Niconico Vocaloid Top 20 chart throughout late 2024 and 2025. By the end of 2025, it took top spot on the year-end list. Overseas, it was the most listened-to Vocaloid song for the first half of 2025, according to data from Luminate and Billboard Japan.

Some other interpretations of the song's meaning have been made, such as a writer for Natalie suggesting that Miku is not actually a stalker, but rather that the character on the other side of the door is sick and hallucinating, citing the psychedelic imagery of the music video as evidence. In an interview with Real Sound, Wataru Sasaki, an employee for Crypton Future Media, the company that created Hatsune Miku, said that the song made him feel "dizzy" when he listened.

The song saw numerous derivative works based on it, such as parodies that replaced Miku with other characters. An English cover was performed by the utaite Rachie and released on May 18, 2025 with an animated music video parodying the original. The song would also eventually be added to the rhythm game Hatsune Miku: Colorful Stage! in June of 2025. In July 2026, it was announced that a Nendoroid figure based on the song would be produced.

== Charts ==
=== Weekly charts ===
Weekly chart performance for "Monitoring"
| Chart | Peak position |
|---|---|
| Billboard Japan Hot 100 | 87 |
| Billboard Japan Top User Generated Songs | 1 |
| Billboard Japan Niconico Vocaloid Songs Top 20 | 1 |
| Oricon Weekly Streaming Trending Ranking | 1 |
| Oricon YouTube Chart Top 10 | 1 |

=== Year-end charts ===
2025 year-end chart performance for "Monitoring"
| Chart | Position |
|---|---|
| Billboard Japan Top User Generated Songs | 1 |
| Billboard Japan 2025 Year-End Niconico Vocaloid Songs | 1 |

== Best Friend remix ==
"Monitoring" (Best Friend remix)

Single by Deco*27 feat. Hatsune Miku
- Language: Japanese
- Released: September 5, 2025
- Genre: J-pop; Vocaloid; Dance-pop
- Length: 2:59
- Label: OTOIRO

Deco*27 singles chronology
| "Cherry Pop" (2025) | "Monitoring" (Best Friend remix) (2025) | "Marshmallow" (2025) |

Music video
- "Monitoring (Best Friend Remix)" on YouTube

On September 5, 2025, the "Monitoring (Best Friend remix)" was released, debuting at number one on the Billboard Japan Niconico Vocaloid Top 20 chart. According to Billboard Japan, listening to the original followed by the remix is the ideal way to engage with the song, as it shifts the listener's perception of the character behind the door. It completely changes the original dark atmosphere of the song, instead becoming an upbeat dance-pop song.
