= Suisoh =

Japanese singer-songwriter

Suisoh 水槽
- Born: Tokyo, Japan
- Origin: Japan
- Genre: J-pop · Utaite
- Occupation: Singer-songwriter · Producer
- Instrument: Vocaloid · Synthesiser
- Years active: 2019-present
- Label: SACRA MUSIC · Universal Music Japan
- Website: suisoh.com

YouTube information
- Channel: 水槽
- Years active: 2018–present
- Subscribers: 205 thousand
- Views: 83 million
- Last updated: February 18, 2026

Suisoh (水槽) (stylized in lowercase) is a Japanese singer-songwriter and Vocaloid producer. She has worked with musicians such as Maisondes, Taku Inoue, WhaleDontSleep, Iyowa, & MIMiNARI, She is signed to SACRA MUSIC, a subsidiary of Sony Music Japan.

== Career ==
Suisoh started her activities around early 2019 on NicoNico Douga where she gained a following as a utaite, she moved over to YouTube where she posted covers until her first original song "NIGHT OWL".

In 2020, she covered the SEVENTHLINKS song "P.H." which amassed over 16 million streams on Spotify.

In 2021, she released her first album "Metropolis".

In 2022, she released her second album "Afterwards".

In 2023, she released her third album "Encounter", marking her first and so-far only album on Universal Music Japan, she did her first tour to accompany the album at Omotesando WALL&WALL.

In 2024 she contributed to Bleach: Thousand-Year Blood War by making the ending theme for its third part, and held her second tour "SOLUBLE" at Daikanyama UNIT.

In 2025, she released her 4th studio album "FLTR" which marks her first album with a physical release and her first release with SACRA MUSIC, the normal first press of the album came with additional sticker and clear jacket, with the limited first press coming with a long digipak, and liner notes. "FLTR" too got an accompanying tour at Ebisu LIQUIDROOM.

In 2026, she released her third EP "4 LOVERS ONLY" featuring yowa, NANAOAKARI, Such, and KAF, and is due to perform her 5th show "REVOLTAGE" at Spotify O-EAST.

== Discography ==
=== Albums ===
Title	Release Date	Label
"Metropolis" (メトロポリス)	February 1, 2021	Self-released
"Afterwards" (事後叙景)	February 4, 2022	Self-released
"Encounter" (夜天邂逅)	August 4, 2023	Universal Music Japan
"FLTR"	April 9, 2025	SACRA MUSIC

=== Extended plays ===
Title	Release Date	Label
"Lanternoid" (ランタノイド)	June 5, 2024	SACRA MUSIC
"MONOCHROME"	December 4, 2024	SACRA MUSIC
"4 LOVERS ONLY"	November 28, 2025	Self-released

=== Digital singles ===
Title	Release Date	Album	Label
"NIGHT OWL" (feat. peg)	October 8, 2020	Non-album singles	Self-released
"TOKYO DRIVER" (feat. Shabo)	October 8, 2020	Non-album singles	Self-released
"IRIS" (アイリス; feat. whaledontsleep)	October 8, 2020	Non-album singles	Self-released
"Rooftop Tokyo" (ルーフトップ トーキョー)	October 8, 2020	Non-album singles	Self-released
"Rayleigh" (レイリー)	October 8, 2020	Non-album singles	Self-released
"Missing Town" (きらいな街; feat. BCNO)	October 29, 2020	Non-album singles	Self-released
"P.H." (self-cover)	November 28, 2020	Non-album singles	Self-released
"Addiction Colour" (アディクションカラー; feat. savasti)	December 24, 2020	Non-album singles	Self-released
"Calling" (遠く鳴らせ)	January 22, 2021	Metropolis	Self-released
"Ghost Is You" (ゴーストの君)	April 30, 2021	Afterwards	Self-released
"Vivid at 5am" (29時はビビッド; feat. Such)	July 2, 2021	Afterwards	Self-released
"Taxi Hijack" (タクシー・ジャック)	September 1, 2021	Afterwards	Self-released
"Afterwards" (事後叙景)	October 22, 2021	Afterwards	Self-released
"Vacant" (空室)	December 15, 2021	Afterwards	Self-released
"Wishing" (白旗)	January 21, 2021	Afterwards	Self-released
"Introduction" (イントロは終わり)	August 5, 2022	Encounter	Universal Music Japan
"Bluenote" (ブルーノート)	September 21, 2022	Encounter	Universal Music Japan
"EAR CANDY" (feat. Bonbero)	November 11, 2022	Encounter	Universal Music Japan
"SWITCH" (feat. Such)	February 18, 2023	Encounter	Universal Music Japan
"Empath" (呼吸率)	March 29, 2023	Encounter	Universal Music Japan
"Hurtend"	July 21, 2023	Encounter	Universal Music Japan
"Impatiens" (feat. tamon)	September 13, 2023	Non-album single	Self-released
"YOUR FAULT" (feat. KASANE TETO)	October 18, 2023	Non-album single	Self-released
"CTRLZ" (feat. Musical Isotope RIME)	November 8, 2023	Non-album single	Self-released
"POLYHEDRON"	December 20, 2023	FLTR	SACRA MUSIC
"LOLLIPOP BULLET" (ロリポップ・バレット)	March 6, 2024	FLTR	SACRA MUSIC
"Lanternoid" (ランタノイド)	April 14, 2024	FLTR	SACRA MUSIC
"Rerun" (再放送)	May 15, 2024	Non-album single	Self-released
"Meaningless" (文学講義; ft. Aizawa)	June 5, 2024	Non-album single	Self-released
"NAVY" (feat. Yuigot)	June 21, 2024	Non-album single	Self-released
"I'mPulse" (feat. r-906)	July 3, 2024	Non-album single	Self-released
"SINKER"	July 17, 2024	FLTR	SACRA MUSIC
"Humanize" (feat. Musical Isotope HARU)	August 23, 2024	Non-album single	Self-released
"MONOCHROME"	October 4. 2024	FLTR	SACRA MUSIC
"README" (feat. TAKU INOUE)	December 4, 2024	Non-album single	Self-released
"Unforgivable" (ゆるされないで)	December 25, 2024	Non-album single	Self-released
"Pseudonym" (スードニム)	January 10, 2025	FLTR	SACRA MUSIC
"Reward System" (報酬系; ft. lilbesh ramko)	February 19, 2025	FLTR	SACRA MUSIC
"Kungful Shot" (カンフルショット)	July 11, 2025	Non-album single	Self-released
"INCIDENT" (feat. yowa)	November 28, 2025	4 LOVERS ONLY	Self-released
"Give Me a Happy Ending" (ハッピーエンドにしてよね; feat. NANAOAKARI)	December 24, 2025	4 LOVERS ONLY	Self-released
"zero gravity" (ft. Such)	January 14, 2026	4 LOVERS ONLY	Self-released
"Almost Forgot Your Birthday" (やっと君の誕生日を忘れた; feat. KAF)	February 11, 2026	4 LOVERS ONLY	Self-released
"CERAMIC SKIN"	July 29, 2026	Non-album single	Self-released
"BLACK BOX" (feat. Hylen)	August 14, 2026	Non-album single	Self-released
"CRITICAL"	October 28, 2026	Non-album single	Self-released

=== As featured artist ===
Title	Artist(s)	Release Date	Album	Label
"Blackout!"	maeshima soshi	July 16, 2021	yet	Good Music Party
"Escape" (逃避行)	Fifteen Voices (十五少女)	November 24, 2021	LISTEN	Avex Entertainment
"FROM EAST" (極東より)	KUJIRAGI	July 7, 2023	Encounter	Universal Music Japan
"Backstage"	lapix	March 31, 2024	FLTR	SACRA MUSIC
"I miss summer" (夏をかえして)	DE DE MOUSE	September 25, 2024	Non-album single	not
"BLUE SCREEN"	KOTONOHOUSE	October 25, 2024	Non-album single	Self-released
"VS"	Punipuni Denki, Gimgigam	May 28, 2025	Non-album single	Self-released
"BRIGHTER"	cinema staff	July 16, 2025	PLASTIC YOUTH	Self-released
"PINK NOISE"	picco	August 13, 2025	Non-album single	Self-released
"Dive In Music"	lapix, Redsign	May 17, 2026	TBD	Self-released
"CEILING CITY" (天井の街)	GROTESQQQUE & Reol	August 26, 2026	TBD	Sony Music Labels
"STAY CUTE"	kawaiibouryoku (暴力的にカワイイ), KMNZ	September 23, 2026	BOURYOKUTEKINIKAWAII 2nd Compilation Album (Disc 2)	Self-released

== Concerts ==
=== Concept Live ===
Name	Date	Venue
1st CONCEPT LIVE "ENCOUNTER"	August 27, 2023	Omotesando WALL&WALL
2nd CONCEPT LIVE "SOLUBLE"	August 20, 2024	Daikanyama UNIT
3rd CONCEPT LIVE "FLTR"	April 19, 2025	Ebisu LIQUIDROOM

=== One-man Performances ===
Name	Date	Venue
JUNCTION	November 27, 2025	Zepp Shinjuku
REVOLTAGE	November 7, 2026 November 14, 2026	Spotify O-EAST
