= Sasuke Haraguchi =

Japanese Vocaloid producer

Sasuke Haraguchi 原口沙輔
- Also known as: Sasuke
- Born: May 21, 2003 (age 23)
- Origin: Ehime, Shikoku, Japan
- Genres: Vocaloid; J-pop; Hyperpop
- Occupations: Musician; record producer; composer
- Years active: 2018–present
- Labels: Warner Music Japan, CDs
- Member of: FM Towns
- Website: sasukeharaguchi.com

Sasuke Haraguchi (Japanese: 原口沙輔, Hepburn: Haraguchi Sasuke; born May 21, 2003) is a Japanese music producer, composer and Vocaloid musician best known for his 2023 song "Hito Mania". He began producing music digitally from a young age, and was noticed by the internet at age fourteen when a recording of him playing the Akai MPC on the streets of Harajuku went viral online. In 2018, he signed a deal with Warner Music Japan and would release J-pop singles under the alias Sasuke until his departure from the label in 2021.

In 2023, he rebranded to his full name, and began to produce electronic Vocaloid songs influenced by hyperpop, gaining popularity after submitting his work to the semi-annual event The Vocaloid Collection. Since then, he has produced music for several media properties and released three studio albums, "Acetone" (2023), "Screen II" (2023), and "Isan" (2026).

== Early life ==
Haraguchi was born on May 21, 2003, in the Ehime Prefecture to music-loving parents. His father would play music of varying genres, both Japanese and Western, around the house when he was young, including Japanese musicians Towa Tei and Ryuichi Sakamoto, who would go on to be significant influences on his music career. At the age of two, Haraguchi picked up an interest in dancing, which led to his father purchasing hip-hop dance DVDs for him. His love of dance also led to him falling in love with funk music due to it being fun to dance to.

At five years old, he began tinkering with GarageBand on his father's MacBook, marking his first steps into music composition. Five years later, a ten-year-old Haraguchi would win the Amateur Night dance competition at the renowned Apollo Theater in Manhattan, New York, making him the youngest Japanese person to win the competition. He first encountered Vocaloid in elementary school through songs made by Livetune member kz that he encountered on SoundCloud, which led to him taking an interest in producing using vocal synthesis technology.

As a teenager, he took an interest in the Akai MPC and would perform using it on the streets of Tokyo. His career would begin in 2018 after a street performance of him finger drumming on his Akai in Harajuku was posted online and went viral on Twitter. He was fourteen when the internet took notice of that performance.

== Musical career ==
=== 2018–2021: Major label career and departure ===
Haraguchi made his major label debut as a three-year contract with Warner Music Japan in 2018 when he was just fifteen years old, at the time going by the mononym Sasuke (styled SASUKE). During this time, he mostly created upbeat J-pop songs, and also worked on the production of jingles. At this point in time, he largely drew inspiration for his lyrics from the news and other things that were not based in his own thoughts and feelings.

In January 2021, Haraguchi made the decision to go independent. Following this, he struggled with a year-long bout of artist's block. Later that year, he performed at the closing ceremony of the 2020 Summer Paralympics in Tokyo. In the next two years, his musical style began to shift towards a more electronic and experimental sound.

=== 2023–present: Rebranding, Vocaloid, and career developments ===
When he decided to begin producing Vocaloid music, he chose Kasane Teto as his primary Utau instrument, citing her official age of 31 as a reason, as he "thought that would be an age where a character could be able to look at the bigger picture of things", according to an interview he did with The Japan Times. On his 20th birthday in 2023, he decided to abandon the alias Sasuke in favor of releasing music under his full name instead. Before this, he had been considering quitting music production entirely.

His first album Acetone took 5 months to complete, with the first demo song being written on December 31, 2022, and eventually released in May 2023. The album was completely self-produced, including the mixing, mastering, and cover art. Unlike the singles that would lead to his success, he uses his own voice on the album rather than a vocal synthesizer. In August 2023, he submitted the song "Hito Mania" to VocaColle 2023 Summer, which would go on to spend 18 consecutive weeks on Billboard Japan's Niconico Vocaloid Songs Top 20 chart. He would follow Acetone with his sophomore album, Screen II, in just under six months.

After TikTok influencer and j-pop singer Yuri [ja] (ゆーり) covered "Hito Mania" in 2023, he took interest in her career and eventually ended up frequently producing music for her. He has produced music for numerous products and works of media, including Sanrio Puroland and Gakuen Idolmaster. In 2024, he formed the future funk duo FM Towns with fellow producer De De Mouse. In 2025, he was recognized by Forbes Japan in the Entertainment & Sports category of their 30 Under 30 list.

== Artistry ==
Sasuke Haraguchi's music is heavily influenced by hyperpop (citing 100 Gecs in particular), dariacore and otoMAD culture, and features significant use of sampling, with the musician having a particular fondness for screaming sounds and the standing bell. Other sources of inspiration he cites include the independent record label Brainfeeder, Shibuya-kei, and the British electronic duo Basement Jaxx. Haraguchi says his largest influences within the Vocaloid scene are Kikuo and Lumo.

His music is predominantly electronic, with Acetone being made almost entirely on a computer with little involvement of traditional instruments. He prefers to keep his songs short to make it easier for fans to cover them, as he enjoys when others create derivative works based on his music.

== Discography ==
Sourced from Apple Music.

=== Studio albums ===
Title	Details
Acetone	Released: May 9, 2023; Label: Self-released; Formats: Digital download, streaming
Screen II	Released: September 30, 2023; Label: Self-released; Formats: Digital download, streaming
Isan	Released: May 30, 2026; Label: CDs; Formats: Digital download, streaming

=== EPs ===
Title	Details
Physsical1 (with Tukumoya)	Released: October 30, 2026; Label: CDs; Formats: Digital download, streaming

=== Singles ===
==== As Sasuke ====
Title	Year	Album
"Influenzer"	2018	Non-album single
"Heisei Owarutteyo"	2018	Non-album single
"Shingengou Oboeuta"	2019	Non-album single
"J-pop Wa Owaranai"	2019	Non-album single
"Natsu Botti"	2019	Non-album single
"Part. 2"	2020	Non-album single
"Mezameru Dake"	2020	Non-album single
"Times"	2020	Non-album single
"Good Gravity"	2021	Non-album single
"Pull Me Out!"	2021	Non-album single
"Planet Nine"	2021	Non-album single
"Tsuyukirai"	2021	Non-album single
"Mata Aimashou"	2022	Non-album single
"PreRomance" (with De De Mouse [ja])	2022	Non-album single
"Get Money"	2022	Non-album single

==== As Sasuke Haraguchi ====
As lead artist

Title	Year	Album
"Hito Mania" (feat. Kasane Teto)	2023	Isan
"Hontono"	2023	Non-album single
"A Word"	2023	Non-album single
"Mini Hen"	2024	Non-album single
"Medicine"	2024	Non-album single
"Utaubot"	2024	Non-album single
"Yureko"	2024	Non-album single
"Cubism" (feat. OMGkawaiiAngel) (Note: From Needy Streamer Overload.)	2024	Non-album single
"Trojan Flower" (with Vacon and Stella Amanofu)	2024	Non-album single
"Evolve Evolve Evolve" (feat. Hatsune Miku) (Note: For Project Voltage.)	2024	Non-album single
"Hear Something"	2024	Non-album single
"maenohanashi"	2025	Non-album single
"Comment"	2025	Non-album single
"Bluelight March" (feat. Miyamai Moca [ja] (宮舞モカ)	2025	Non-album single
"and YOU"	2025	Non-album single
"Afterimage" (with Tsukino Mito [ja] (月ノ美兎))	2025	Isan
"Pac-Maniac 45" (Note: For Pac-Man.)	2025	Non-album single
"Superkinds"	2025	Non-album single
"Overlap Tomato Can"	2025	Non-album single
"Busy Day" (with Shikibu Meguri)	2025	Non-album single
"Nora Heroes" (with Takafumi Sato [ja] (佐藤貴文), Sasakure.UK [ja], Cassie Wei, Ramune Yamada, Mitsukiyo [ja] (ミツキヨ) and Tsubasa Handa, feat. Hatsune Miku)	2025	Non-album single
"Shame of Know"	2025	Non-album single
"Yu-En" (with Mou Ishida and Fuzichoco [ja] (藤ちょこ))	2026	Non-album single
"Timeout Substitute Noid"	2026	Non-album single
"Broadcast"	2026	Non-album single

As featured artist

Title	Year	Album
"Popcorn!" (with Maisondes, Hello Kitty and Narumiya)	2024	Non-album single
"My Gasoline" (with Dios [ja], Tanaka, Ichika Nito [ja] and Sasanomaly [ja] (ササノマリイ))	2024	Gasoline
"Represent Akihabara" (with Real Akiba Boyz [ja])	2024	Our Masterpiece
"Kuru Trouble" (with Empty Disc. and Yuika)	2025	Non-album single
"Jingoku Sensei" (with AVYSS and E5)	2025	I.e
"Masala Palette" (with U-zhaan [ja])	2025	Tabla Dhi, Tabla Dha
"Outa in the Rain" (with Ui [ja])	2025	Ui 1st Official Album "Amenochi Parade"
"Ending Routine" (with Soushi Sakiyama)	2026	Good Life, Good People
"Momo" (with Kairui, feat. Hatsune Miku)	2026	Shells
"Fictionary" (with Norimaro, Talich Helfen, KAF, and Azsagawa)	2026	Non-album single

=== Guest appearances ===
Title	Year	Album
"Unaware" (feat. Kasane Teto)	2024	Uso no Tsukikata
"Unaware (Aka-Chan Remix)" (with Aka-Chan City Pop, feat. Kasane Teto)	2024	Uso no Tsukikata
"In The Bros." (with Hako, feat. Kasane Teto)	2024	Uso no Tsukikata
"Everyone is a Monkey"	2024	Zenbuore Soukangou
"To Be Strange!"	2024	Gousei Onsei no Yukue 3
"The Internet Ending Theme"	2025	ZenbuOre2
"Hito-Mania (Teto Live 2025 -Live Arrange-)" (with Asa, feat. Kasane Teto)	2025	TetoLive 2025 Live Compilation
"Igaku (Teto Live 2025 -Live Arrange-)" (with Asa, feat. Kasane Teto)	2025	TetoLive 2025 Live Compilation
"Harmony" (with Sheeno Mirin, feat. Hatsune Miku)	2025	Harmony
"Theme 01" (with CDs)	2025	CSS_Compilation1
"Goodbye to the Black Punishment (Bye)" (with Mustard)	2026	Kireru Kado Ni Wa Neko Kitaru Where Rage Lives, Cats Arrive
"Kaze Ga Fuiteiru" (with Ikimonogakari)	2026	Ikimonogakari Meets 2
"A Love Story That Ended Long Ago!" (with Maigo Hasegawa, feat. Kasane Teto)	2026	Uso No Kanaekata
"Jinsei Game Album Remix" (with Soushi Sakiyama)	2026	Good Life, Good People
"DIY"	2026	Zenbu Ore Part III
"Fragment" (feat. Macne Nana)	2026	Cut (e) Vol.3
"Love in Prayer"	2026	Re:Mahou Shoujo
"Movement 1: Hajime ~ Pon De Beach ~ Summer Carnival!! (from Day/Night Act 1: Summer Reverberation) (Live)" (with Taku Inoue, Makoto Miyazaki, & Tokyo Philharmonic Orchestra) (Note: For The Idolmaster.)	2026	The IDOLM@STER 20th Anniversary Orchestra Symphony of Brilliant Stars Concert Album
