= Needy Streamer Overload =

2022 visual novel

- Developer: Xemono
- Publishers: WSS Playground, Alliance Arts Inc.
- Producer: Daichi Saitō
- Artist: Ohisashiburi
- Writer: Nyalra
- Composer: Aiobahn
- Engine: Unity
- Platforms: macOS; Microsoft Windows; Nintendo Switch; PlayStation 4; PlayStation 5
- Release: macOS, Windows; January 21, 2022; Nintendo Switch; October 27, 2022; PS4, PS5; January 20, 2025
- Genres: Visual novel, denpa, management simulation
- Mode: Single-player

Needy Streamer Overload is a 2022 denpa-inspired visual novel created by Japanese developer Xemono and published by WSS Playground for macOS, Microsoft Windows, and Nintendo Switch, and by Alliance Arts Inc. for PS4 and PS5. The player takes on the role of a manager for a female livestreamer, making decisions for her so that she can achieve her goal of reaching one million followers within a month. The game was initially titled Needy Girl Overdose, but this was changed for the English release, while the game kept its original title in Japan.

An anime television series adaptation produced by Yostar Pictures aired from April to June 2026.

== Gameplay ==
In-game screenshot, demonstrating the game interface. A live feed of Ame can be seen in the top-left, while her stats can be monitored in the Task Manager in the top-right, and the player converses with her using the JINE messenger in the bottom-right. Daily activities are selected via the desktop icons.

The player interacts with the protagonist Ame exclusively through a pastel-themed Windows 95–esque user interface, selecting her daily tasks via desktop icons, monitoring her stats via the Task Manager, and conversing with her through an instant messenger service called JINE (a parody of LINE). Each day is divided into noon, dusk, and evening timeslots, and various actions can take up one or multiple of these timeslots. Ame can only livestream during the evening, as that is the time of day when stream viewers are most active. During Ame's livestreams, the player takes on the role of a content moderator responsible for deleting or promoting viewer comments within the stream's live chat. After streaming or concluding various activities, the player is able to obtain a glimpse of Ame's thoughts and mood via her posts on Tweeter (a parody of Twitter). (Note: Localised as "Tweeter" in the English release, and "Poketter" in the Japanese and Chinese releases.)

Alongside follower count, Ame has three stats which the player will need to monitor, namely stress, affection (towards the player), and mental darkness. Should certain attributes become too high or low, Ame will begin to display adverse effects. Activities that the player can choose for Ame may involve searching for new stream ideas, spending time together, sleeping, or abusing prescription and illicit drugs. Each of these activities affects Ame's stats in differing ways.

At release, there were originally 22 different endings to the game, which are encountered based on the player's choices. Additional endings were added in an October 28, 2022 update coinciding with the game's Nintendo Switch release.

== Setting ==
Ame (あめちゃん, Ame-chan) is a mentally ill young girl with a needy personality, who has dropped out of school and confined herself at home, living together with the self-insert player protagonist. In order to pay for rent, and to meet her parasocial attention needs, Ame decides to commence livestreaming on the internet, where she takes on the online persona of "OMGkawaiiAngel" (超絶最かわてんしちゃん, Chōzetsu saikawa tenshi-chan; lit. 'transcendental cute angel'), or "KAngel" (超てんちゃん, Chōten-chan) for short, interacting with her stream viewers as she dons her wig, makeup, and cute outfit. The protagonist, affectionately called P-chan (ピちゃん, pi-chan), is tasked with managing her day-to-day life as she increases her follower count.

== Development ==
Game development began in June 2020 under the initial title Needy Girl Overdose. (Note: The title is a pun in Japanese; nīdī (ニーディー) refers to "2D", i.e. two-dimensional, thus "needy girl" is a double entendre for "2D girl".) The title of the game for its English-language and Chinese-language releases were later changed to Needy Streamer Overload and "主播女孩重度依賴" (pinyin: zhǔbō nǚhái zhòngdù yīlài; lit. 'the streamer girl is heavily reliant') respectively; the reason for the title change was not disclosed. During the development process, the game was prototyped in Figma, and then built using the Unity engine. The game was initially scheduled for release during Spring 2021; eventually a release date of June 5, 2021 was announced, however was later delayed by the developers, citing the need for additional quality improvements. This seven month delay was later explained to have allowed the further implementation of additional game event scenarios, and a three- to four-fold increase in the number of animations. The game's dialogue has a wordcount of over 140,000 in the original Japanese script.

Nyalra (にゃるら), who had previously written various literature focused on mental illness, was responsible for the planning and writing of the game, while illustrator Ohisashiburi (お久しぶり) was responsible for the character designs. The game's art direction heavily draws influence from vaporwave aesthetics and retro pixel art from the PC-98 era, along with 1990s-era bishōjo games. There were originally four different female characters with unique personality traits planned during the early stages of development; however, it was eventually decided that the final game would only feature a single heroine, combining various personality traits into the one character.

Following the commercial success of the game's initial download-only Windows release, a Nintendo Switch port was announced in May 2022, including a Japan-exclusive physical release fanart book and a CD of the game's soundtrack. The Switch version was released on October 27, 2022, alongside a major update including new endings and text across platforms.

On November 7, 2025, game developer Xemono revealed that WSS Playground has suspended the distribution of royalties with Xemono since May 2023, paying a portion of the agreed-upon revenue share only after legal action was initiated by Xemono's lawyers, and terminated their revenue sharing contract with Xemono on July 1, 2025. The developer also claimed that producer Daichi Saitō (斉藤大地) from WSS Playground made unfair demands towards them, and that their development studio will cease all further involvement with the Needy Streamer Overload franchise.

=== Music ===
The game's theme song is "Internet Overdose" by producer Aiobahn and vocalist KOTOKO, composed and produced in a denpa song style. The song is available as a playable track in the music rhythm games Muse Dash and Arcaea, as part of their respective collaboration updates. The theme has also charted on the Spotify "Japan Viral 50" chart. On March 16, 2023, a sequel titled "INTERNET YAMERO", also produced by Aiobahn and sung by KOTOKO, was released on YouTube, Spotify, and other music streaming and distribution platforms.

On April 4, 2022, publisher WSS Playground announced that in addition to being sold via online music distribution services, the game's soundtrack would also be released on 12-inch vinyl record format, which was released on June 29, 2022.

== Reception ==
=== Sales ===
Needy Streamer Overload sold over 100,000 copies during its first week of release, with a Steam rating of "overwhelmingly positive" based on more than 5,800 user reviews during the first month. As of September 2023, the game has sold over 1.2 million copies on Steam, with 51% of sales coming from Chinese Steam users. The Nintendo Switch version sold 11,693 copies within its first week of release in Japan, making it the tenth best-selling retail game of the week in the country. As of November 2025, it has sold more than three million units.

=== Critical response ===
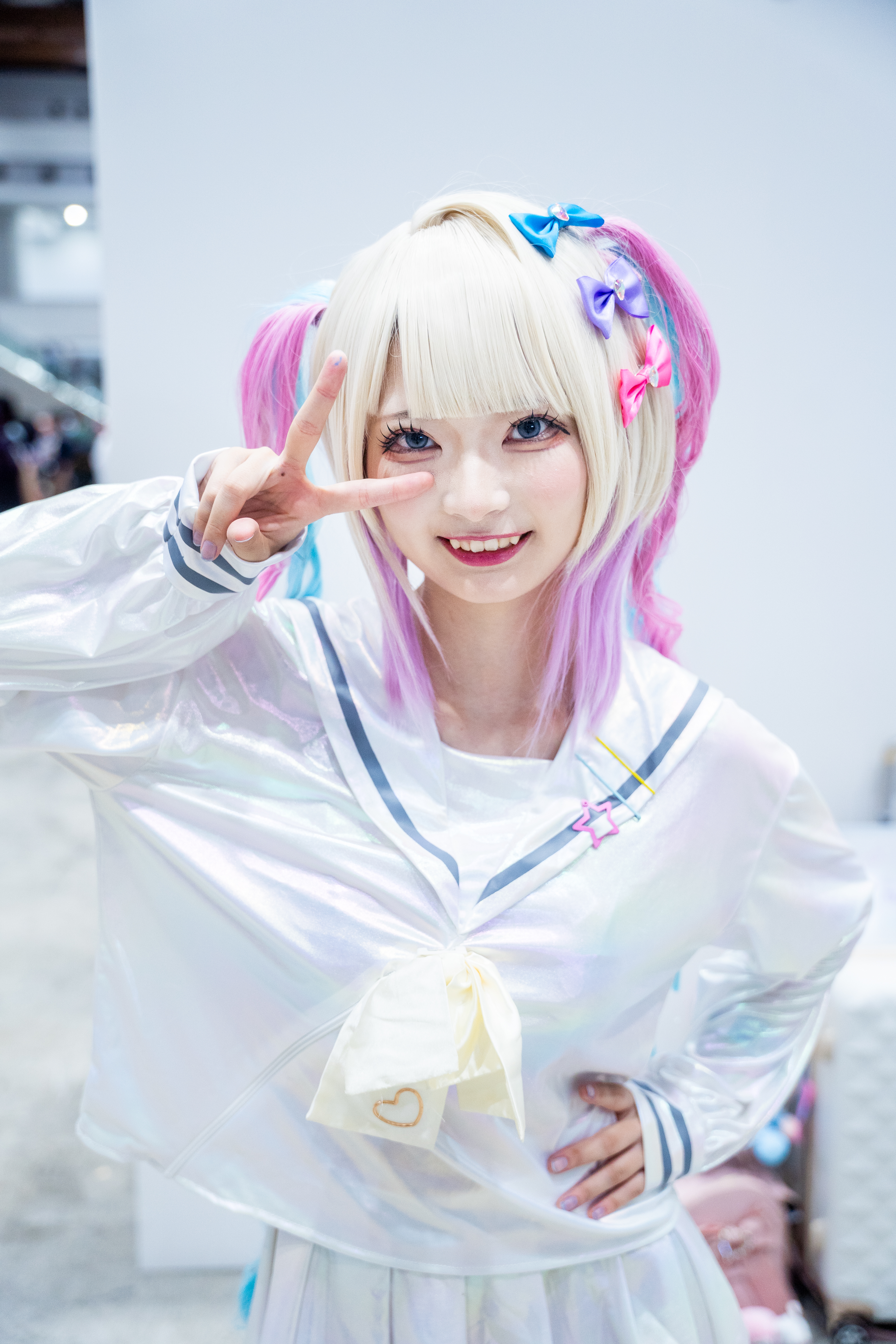
Cosplay of KAngel at Comic Market 102

Needy Streamer Overload received positive reviews upon release. Its depiction of mental illness and live streaming culture were noted by critics. IGN Japan notes that Needy Streamer Overload has merit as a work of satire intended at picking apart modern live streaming culture and toxic relationships. Dengeki Online suggested that despite the gratuitous use of mentally disturbing content, Needy Streamer Overload was full of expressiveness that can only be delivered through games as a medium, and players unfamiliar with internet culture might not fully appreciate what the game attempts to portray. ITmedia wrote Needy Streamer Overload is a title with a high degree of precision, closely satirising the intended audience's internet addiction while at the same time acknowledging how it forms part of their identity. A review by United Daily News, acknowledging that the game's themes may be too heavy for some audiences, claimed that the game is a "masterpiece" for players who enjoy the premise of exploring menhera issues and are fans of denpa culture, and praised the official Chinese language localisation of the game, especially in regards to its use of Chinese internet memes.

The gameplay received mixed reception. United Daily News positively compared the game progression experience to that of Undertale, in reference to how the player learns more and more about Ame during each subsequent playthrough to unlock all the endings. IGN Japan criticised the limited choices and gimmicks available to express the player character, arguing that the player is not allowed to become properly aware of any consequences from their interactions with Ame. ITmedia claimed the game has a few rough areas and bugs which detract from the experience.

An English-language review from Rice Digital focused on analyzing the game's commentary on contemporary social media and livestreaming culture, noting the game's popularity among VTubers, and remarks that there is no single correct way to play the game.

=== Accolades ===
Needy Streamer Overload won the "Most Stream-friendly Game" and "Best New Characters" awards at the 2022 Indie Live Expo Awards in Japan. The game was also one of two runner-up titles receiving honourable mention for the Game Designers Award at the 2022 Japan Game Awards.

== Anime adaptation ==
- Needy Girl Overdose
- Genre: Action
- Created by: Xemono, WSS Playground
- Anime television series
- Directed by: Masaoki Nakashima
- Produced by: Yoshitaka Kimura
- Written by: Nyalra
- Music by: Aiobahn +81; Sasuke Haraguchi; DÉ DÉ MOUSE
- Studio: Yostar Pictures
- Licensed by: NA: Aniplex of America; SEA: Plus Media Networks Asia
- Original network: Tokyo MX, BS11, GYT, GTV, Wowow
- Original run: April 5, 2026 – June 28, 2026
- Episodes: 13

An anime television series adaptation was announced on November 10, 2025. It is produced by Yostar Pictures and directed by Masaoki Nakashima, with character designs by Kenji Saikai, Akari Takei, and Kaito Shimizu, and music by Aiobahn +81, Sasuke Haraguchi, Tokyo Town and DÉ DÉ Mouse. The series aired from April 5 to June 28, 2026 on Tokyo MX and other networks. (Note: Tokyo MX listed the series premiere on April 4 at 24:30, which is effectively April 5 at 12:30 a.m. JST.) A theatrical cut of the anime was screened at Theatre Shinjuku in Tokyo and Theatre Umeda in Osaka on March 6, 2026. The opening theme song is "Internet Angel" performed by "KAngel" ("Chōten-chan"), while the ending theme song is "Levitation" performed by Tatsuya Kitani. Aniplex of America licensed the series and streamed it on Crunchyroll, while Plus Media Networks Asia has licensed the series in Southeast Asia.

In a statement made on Twitter on the day of the anime's announcement, Nyalra revealed that he will not be involved in the promotion of the anime series, and alleged that WSS Playground had withheld wages and had engaged in power harassment against him, with the company currently still in negotiations with his lawyer. He stated that the company threatened to halt production of the anime unless he was removed from involvement in the project, that a planned music event for KAngel featuring unreleased new songs for the anime was cancelled as a result, and that he was medically diagnosed with an adjustment disorder and depression over the span of the dispute. WSS Playground released a response to Nyalra's statement, disputing his recollection of events and claiming that he had been adequately compensated for his work.

=== Episodes ===
No.	Title (Note: Each episode is named after a song title.)	Directed by	Storyboarded by	Chief animation directed by	Original release date
1	"She's a Killer Queen"	Shunsuke Nishimura	Masaoki Nakashima	Akari Takei	April 5, 2026
Popular livestreamer KAngel performs a concert to her dedicated fans, who watch her as their escape from reality. Privately, however, Ame continues consuming drugs and alcohol to continue her dream of becoming the world's number one streamer with P-chan. Kache discusses how social media has negatively affected every facet of a person's life, as she begins work at a themed cafe and suffers physical and sexual abuse from her boyfriend. A news broadcast is shown of the dangers of celebrity worship and individuals voicing concerns of society becoming influenced by KAngel's behavior. KAngel justifies her behavior in an interview by saying it is her way of expressing her true self, adding that her critics will beat down anyone sticking out into submission. KAngel then stresses the importance of having dreams within a society bent on misplacing blame on others rather than addressing them. She is informed of the streaming group Karamazov challenging her popularity through their leader, Purple Lollipop, who aspires to kill KAngel.
2	"Just the Two of Us"	Shinichi Tabe	Shinichi Tabe	Akari Takei	April 12, 2026
Karamazov, which consists of Purple Lollipop, Kache's former schoolmate Michica Gokubara, and Nechika, plan to interview KAngel, while Ame rants on her critics wishing for KAngel to retire. Kache vents to Karamazov on selling her youth to continue feeling valued, and Karamazov reassures her actions are not bad if it benefits the greater good. Purple Lollipop adds that anyone can become influential by setting aside their sanity and putting on a mask before sending away Kache. KAngel confidently states she will remain popular in spite of Karamazov's passion to defeat her as the interview begins. Karamazov and KAngel compete for the audience's attention, while also confiding on their struggle of becoming pedestals for their audiences. KAngel wins over the audience by recalling how a meek Purple Lollipop first supported her. A deranged fan then attempts to kill KAngel, though she ignores them while wanting to reunite with P-chan. Ame promises to P-chan in a recording to stay by their side even if she loses herself to KAngel.
3	"Internet Overdose" (Note: "Internet Overdose" is a song from the original game's soundtrack.)	Hayate Ninomiya	Hayate Ninomiya and Masaoki Nakashima	Meng Yan-ni	April 19, 2026
Ame recalls growing up under her dysfunctional parents, who continuously argued with each other and separated. She asks her grandmother on the concept of reincarnation and wonders why people believe it to ease their suffering. After discovering her love for anime and games, Ame aspires to become a savior to the less fortunate. Ame struggles to live a normal life, garnering the ire of the adults and teenagers around her. Despite this, Ame remains determined in fulfilling her goal. Ame goads a bullied student to fight back against his bullies, but this fails as the student is beaten up in retaliation. Ame later violently assaults her mother when the latter recommended that she prostitute herself, before voicing her desire to give up on her goal. In the present, Ame, performing as KAngel, shares to her fans how influencers and streamers may fabricate their stories to gain sympathy and support. KAngel states her belief that the blurring between facts and lies has its own appeal, remarking that delusions can comfort an individual. KAngel composes a song based on these conclusions, as Ame later watches an interview with KAngel discussing the song's themes.
4	"London Calling"	Ling Chaohuo	Masaoki Nakashima	Meng Yan-ni	April 26, 2026
Kache contemplates on her worth as a person despite feeling unremarkable, as she remembers seeing Michica's rising popularity during their time in middle school. Kache voiced concern on Michica's new lifestyle, but Michica requested to come see her if she seeks to escape a mundane and suffocating life. Upon seeing Michica date Nechika, Kache accepted that Michica disregards her. Kache further grows frustrated after her boyfriend egosurfs her name to see derisive feedback and subsequently assaults her. Kache approaches Karamazov again on her problems, and the group suggests that Kache take control of her life and not give in to conformist peer pressure. Kache later listens to KAngel discussing about individualism, which inspires Kache to spring into action and rebrand herself. She quits her theme cafe job and breaks up with her boyfriend. Kache experiences joy in being her own person before fixing her makeup. Meanwhile, Ame suffers an emotional outburst when she sees her critics demeaning KAngel.
5	"Whatever"	Hayate Ninomiya	Morihito Abe and Masaoki Nakashima	Meng Yan-ni	May 3, 2026
Karamazov prepares for their first concert as they meet Kache and learn of her breakup. The group buys her a new set of clothes to reflect her growth, leaving Kache surprised and nervous. Karamazov leaves to practice for the concert, and Kache wishes them luck. As this is happening, Purple Lollipop recalls meeting Nechika and Michica after attending KAngel's talk show. Purple Lollipop rebrands herself from an introverted and unassuming girl to a confident and boisterous leader and forms Karamazov with her new groupmates. Purple Lollipop takes a break from practice and visits an arcade, during which she meets Ame. Ame senses Purple Lollipop's dilemma, causing the latter to confide of her worries of feeling left out after Nechika and Michica became close to Kache. Purple Lollipop thanks Ame for listening to her, and Ame and KAngel voice intrigue towards future developments. A reinvigorated Purple Lollipop leads Karamazov to success on the day of their first concert, while boasting they will continue inspiring others.
6	"Turn Around and Count 2 Ten"	Hayate Ninomiya	Morihito Abe and Masaoki Nakashima	Meng Yan-ni	May 10, 2026
Michica ruminates on the concept and meaning of beauty while reminiscing on rebelling against social norms in middle school. Michica also thinks on her identity as she admits on formerly wanting to die at a young age as a way to conclude a beautiful life. Michica discusses in imaginary conversations on how the masses can choose to warp and immortalize their beauty as memories. She expresses her aspiration to live a life detached from material wealth and belongings, likening it to living closer to God. Michica also confides in her fears of sealing away her beauty within memories when Purple Lollipop shares the story of Pete Burns wanting to maintain his beauty. Despite these, Michica strives to continue forward in remaining beautiful through sensibility, resulting in her finding eternal life and challenging higher beings as the epitome of beauty. Michica gifts Purple Lollipop an inverted cross to highlight their goal of beating KAngel, as Purple Lollipop gives her a new dress.
7	"Slip Inside This House"	Shunsuke Nishimura	Shunsuke Nishimura and Masaoki Nakashima	Meng Yan-ni	May 17, 2026
Nechika encounters Ame while strolling around. She recognizes Ame as KAngel's real identity, and the two debate on survival and KAngel's influence at a cafe. Nechika voices Karamazov's intent to defeat KAngel in popularity and usher in a new era that inspires future individuals. She then points out KAngel's early volatile career influencing people like Karamazov, though Ame insists it is her method of survival and a way to achieve her personal goals. Ame retorts that Nechika only views other people at face value, while Nechika bluntly asks on her mission to save the less fortunate as KAngel. They acknowledge society's unwillingness to change without the input of an authority figure, but Ame admits she cannot hate them. Seeing this, Nechika realizes that Karamazov's goal of beating KAngel is harder than anticipated. Nechika visits her impoverished family, who cheer her on in her mission with Karamazov and give a huge sum of cash. Nechika is left surprised by their compassion and gifts Purple Lollipop a finger claw ring. Nechika declares her intent of continuing her goal with Karamazov.
8	"Absolute Ego Dance"	Shinichi Tabe	Shinichi Tabe and Masaoki Nakashima	Zeng Pinqiao, Cai Mengshu, and Meng Yan-ni	May 24, 2026
Ame becomes ecstatic at KAngel's polarizing popularity, while Karamazov grows pleased at their growth as influencers. The group sets up a Christmas stream to land the killing blow on KAngel's popularity. At the arcade, Ame ponders on the meaning of true happiness in Night on the Galactic Railroad before spending time with Purple Lollipop again. Ame wishes a nervous Purple Lollipop to do her best in her goal and shows pictures of her with P-chan, during which Purple Lollipop notices Ame's similarities to KAngel. Meanwhile, Kache voices satisfaction at her new life though laments on still feeling insignificant. She calls Michica to cheer her up on her goal with Karamazov, but a distressed Michica dismisses Kache on being her friend. Fearing she has grown weak from her friendships and sensing her life crumbling, Michica runs away before the start of Karamazov's stream, worrying Purple Lollipop and Nechika. Kache tracks Michica to their former school and they confront each other.
9	"Blue Monday"	Yoshifumi Sasahara	Yoshifumi Sasahara	Akari Takei, Cai Mengshu, and Meng Yan-ni	May 31, 2026
Michica and Kache argue on their friendship and fight. Michica rants on her frustrations as an influencer which cause her to become self-destructive. Kache asserts that the less fortunate look up to people like Michica because of their ability to weather through their suffering. Purple Lollipop and Nechika lend their assistance to help Michica mentally recover. Michica also opens up to Kache on her fears of fitting in and thanks her efforts. Sometime later, Purple Lollipop dreams of a conversation with Ame regarding the meaning of true happiness. Purple Lollipop regretfully acknowledges her perception of happiness differs to Ame's view, and Ame deems her as a traitor. As Christmas approaches, media coverage on the duel between KAngel and Karamazov increases, with both parties voicing their desire to win. Kache meets with Karamazov and gifts Purple Lollipop a pair of earrings as support for their upcoming duel. A narration then compares the group's bond to the Karamazov brothers, concluding that their growth is tumultuous yet beautiful.
10	"Antichrist Superstar"	Morihito Abe	Masaoki Nakashima	Akari Takei	June 7, 2026
Purple Lollipop quotes Osamu Dazai's "Heed My Plea", comparing her relationship with KAngel to that of Judas and Jesus. On the day of the duel, it is explained that it will last two rounds and KAngel can only win if she beats Karamazov in both. The first round is a singing contest, which KAngel wins. The second round is a one-on-one battle between KAngel and Purple Lollipop, and a surreal fight ensues. Purple Lollipop criticizes KAngel for giving all her love and devotion to her fans while rejecting personal relationships. When KAngel says that she has P-chan, Purple Lollipop calls her out and retorts that P-chan's existence is her delusion. KAngel falters, which allows Purple Lollipop to gain the upper hand. Purple Lollipop's jewelries transform into a cross, nails, and a spear that she uses to crucify and metaphorically kill KAngel, winning the fight. Purple Lollipop attempts to make amends with KAngel, telling her she would be willing to have a rematch in the future.
11	"Canon a 3 Violinis con Basso c. / Gigue"	Hayate Ninomiya	Hayate Ninomiya and Masaoki Nakashima	Akari Takei	June 14, 2026
Ame spirals into a self-destructive episode in the aftermath of the duel. She also grows increasingly paranoid with KAngel becoming irrelevant and her detractors using the opportunity to degrade and sexually assault her. KAngel's divisive reputation is later judged in a kangaroo court setting. Despite KAngel defending herself as being an individual with good intentions, her detractors nevertheless criticize her for her selfishness. Realizing that she is not acting as herself, KAngel and Ame figuratively kill each other. Ame later recalls her seeking out imaginary friends in Alice and Usa-pyon to alleviate her mother's neglect of her. However, they remain insufficient in her dysfunctional life, prompting an infuriated Ame to kill them. Ame then reminisces on beginning her streaming career as KAngel with the help of P-chan before further deteriorating. Meanwhile, Purple Lollipop and Kache head to Ame's penthouse to check on her wellbeing.
12	"Internet Yamero" (Note: "Internet Yamero" is a song from the original game's soundtrack.)	Masaoki Nakashima	Masaoki Nakashima	Akari Takei, Zeng Pinqiao, and Meng Yan-ni	June 21, 2026
Purple Lollipop and Kache barge into the penthouse and pull Ame out of her self-destructive episode. Ame recovers with Karamazov and Kache, learning through Michica that they are flawed individuals like herself. Ame also wonders on KAngel's place in society as she slowly builds trust with the girls. After attending the funeral of Nechika's father, Ame applauds Nechika's determination in reaching her goal with Karamazov. A few days later, Kache encounters Ame preparing to leave as KAngel. KAngel reveals she must continue her mission even with her critics still being active, likening her decision to the resurrection of Jesus. She also admits her selfishness in wanting to seek approval, before complimenting Kache's kindness and asking her to use them for good. KAngel reflects on the beauty of humanity in spite of its shortcomings and announces her return, much to the jubilation of her fans. She triumphantly performs her concert while Karamazov and Kache watch on. Sometime after the concert, KAngel vanishes from streaming. An older Kache visits a shrine honoring KAngel and turns to the viewer, voicing her intention to share the aftermath of their lives.
13	"EZ Do Dance"	Ye Hui Qi	Masaoki Nakashima	Akari Takei, Cai Mengshu, and Meng Yan-ni	June 28, 2026
An alternate reality is presented of Ame, Karamazov, and Kache experiencing more hardship without KAngel's intervention, before showcasing the epilogue to their actual lives. Following Karamazov's disbandment, Purple Lollipop grows into a world-renowned fashion artist and entrepreneur who imparts her knowledge of fashion boosting an individual's confidence. Michica also becomes an influential figure to lolita fashion who educates the public on the reasons for self-harm and drug overdoses based on her past experiences. Nechika loses contact with Karamazov as she goes on a journey of self-discovery. Nechika meets an older Ame, where they discuss the legacy left behind by KAngel. Kache accepts her mundane life being a part of her identity and agrees to her partner's marriage proposal while reuniting with Karamazov. KAngel, who recalls her goal of finding true happiness, becomes a savior for a fan for one last time, and they talk about their hardships. In a post-credits scene, KAngel points out to the viewer that the events presented are one of many possibilities of how life can progress, stating that true happiness can only happen from within.

== Other media ==
A manga anthology titled KAngel! Needy Girl Overdose Official Anthology (超てんちゃん！ NEEDY GIRL OVERDOSE 公式アンソロジー) began serialisation on ComicWalker and Nico Nico Seiga from December 23, 2022 onwards, featuring illustrations from Ui Shigure, Ohisashiburi, and 11 other artists. A manga adaptation written by Itaru Bonnoki and illustrated by Nata Ōkura, titled Needy Girl Overdose: Run with My Sick, began serialization on Akita Shoten's Manga Cross manga website on March 21, 2023.

A typing game spin-off named Needy Streamer Overload: Typing of the Net was released on January 21, 2025.
