= Weather Station (album) =

Studio album by Inabakumori
- Released: March 23, 2022
- Genres: Alternative rock; electronic rock; J-pop
- Length: 38:08
- Language: Japanese
- Label: SMEJ
- Producer: Inabakumori

Inabakumori chronology
Anticyclone (2019)	Weather Station (2022)

Singles from Weather Station
- 1. "Secret Elementary School Student" Released: December 4, 2019; 2. "Lagtrain" Released: July 16, 2020; 3. "A Flower Waiting for the Wind" Released: August 19, 2020; 4. "Rainy Boots" Released: June 23, 2021; 5. "Loneliness of Spring" Released: October 1, 2021; 6. "Hello Marina" Released: November 20, 2021; 7. "Kimi ni Kaikisen" Released: March 7, 2022

Weather Station (stylized in all caps, Japanese: ウェザーステーション) is the second studio album by Japanese Vocaloid producer Inabakumori. His major label debut, it was released on March 23, 2022. The album's cover art was designed by Japanese illustrator Nukunuku Nigirimeshi.

== Background ==
On February 22, 2022, he announced the album's release. It included songs written several years ago that were never released as a single. He shared to the album as "packed with some of my favorite music."

== Content ==
As with his debut album Anticyclone, most of the songs on the album feature vocals by Kaai Yuki. "Hello Marina" features both Kaai Yuki and Hatsune Miku, and "Loneliness of Spring" and "Post Shelter" both feature Tsurumaki Maki. The second single from the album, "Lagtrain", was released on July 16, 2020, and had 108 million views on YouTube as of November 2026, making it one of his best known songs.

== Track listing ==
All tracks are written by Inabakumori.

Weather Station track listing
No.	Title	Length
1.	"Secret Elementary School Student" (ひみつの小学生)	3:23
2.	"Hello Marina" (ハローマリーナ)	3:22
3.	"Rainy Boots" (レイニーブーツ)	3:14
4.	"Lagtrain" (ラグトレイン)	4:12
5.	"Loneliness of Spring" (ハルノ寂寞)	3:08
6.	"A Flower Waiting for the Wind" (カゼマチグサ)	3:31
7.	"Radar" (レーダー)	3:12
8.	"Katamusubi" (かたむすび)	3:39
9.	"Tenkyuu" (天泣)	3:27
10.	"Post Shelter" (ポストシェルター)	3:23
11.	"Kimi ni Kaikisen" (きみに回帰線)	3:32
Total length:		38:08

== Charts ==
Chart (2022)	Peak position
Japanese Hot Albums (Billboard Japan)	45
