= Inabakumori =

Japanese musician

inabakumori 稲葉曇
- Born: February 25, 1995 (age 31)
- Origin: Fukuoka City, Fukuoka Prefecture, Japan
- Genres: J-pop; Pop rock
- Occupations: Songwriter, composer
- Instruments: Kaai Yuki, Hatsune Miku, Vocaloid, Synthesizer V, CeVIO, guitar
- Years active: 2016–present

YouTube information
- Channel: Inabakumori
- Subscribers: 963 thousand
- Views: 440 million
- Last updated: October 9th, 2026

Inabakumori (styled in all capital letters or all lower case letters, Japanese: 稲葉曇; born February 25, 1995) is a Japanese musician, Vocaloid producer and songwriter. His most notable works are Lost Umbrella (ロストアンブレラ) in 2019 and Lagtrain (ラグトレイン) in 2020.

== Career ==
"Lagtrain"
Sample of Inabakumori's "Lagtrain", performed by Kaai Yuki. The single is a pop rock song with a tempo of 147 BPM, characterized by a drop in pitch of the melody at the beginning of the refrain.

Inabakumori's account began publishing music in 2016, debuting with the song Secret Music (秘密音楽) using Kaai Yuki. However, he previously produced music under the account MichouP (Japanese: 視長P), also known as Inaba Pukari (Japanese: 因幡プカリ), from 2011 to 2014, and in 2019 published three songs he created in 2014 and 2015 after abandoning that alias. His content surged in popularity some time after the release of Lost Umbrella (ロストアンブレラ) in 2018, when the song was used widely on TikTok. He published his first album, Anticyclone (アンチサイクロン), in 2019.

The videos accompanying early songs featured his own art of Kaai Yuki until the release of "Lost Umbrella", when he collaborated with illustrator Nukunuku Nigirimeshi, with art featuring his character Osage-chan.

Inabakumori has spoken about his respect for Wowaka, with many of his songs being influenced by his works.

On October 6, 2023, inabakumori released the song Electricity Forecast (電気予報) as a part of the crossover between The Pokémon Company and Crypton Future Media called "Project VOLTAGE".

== Discography ==
=== Albums ===
- Anticyclone is inabakumori's first album, released on November 17, 2019 during THE VOC@LOiD M@STER 45.
- Chimera is a collaboration album featuring 12 Vocalo-Ps (Vocaloid Producers) in which inabakumori collaborated on the song "Roleless Weapon" with Vocalo-P Neru, released on October 15, 2021.
- Weather Station is inabakumori's second album, released on March 23, 2022.
- Project Voltage 18 Types/Songs Collection is a compilation album to which inabakumori contributed the song “Denki Yohou” and the remix “Journey's Prequels, Journey's Traces (tabitabi Remix) feat. Hatsune Miku”, released on November 13, 2024.
- Personya Respect is an album by Nekomata Okayu, to which inabakumori contributed the track "Decogradation", released on May 14, 2025.

=== Singles ===
| Release date | Title | Voice | URL |
|---|---|---|---|
| December 4, 2019 | "Secret Elementary School Student" | Kaai Yuki | YouTube |
| July 16, 2020 | "Lagtrain" | Kaai Yuki | YouTube |
| August 19, 2020 | "a flower waiting for the wind" | Meika Hime | YouTube |
| June 23, 2021 | "Rainy Boots" | Kaai Yuki | YouTube |
| October 1, 2021 | "Loneliness of Spring" | Tsurumaki Maki | YouTube |
| November 20, 2021 | "Hello Marina" | Kaai Yuki & Hatsune Miku | YouTube |
| March 7, 2022 | "Kimi ni Kaikisen" | Kaai Yuki | YouTube |
| January 29, 2022 | "Post Shelter" | Tsurumaki Maki | YouTube |
| January 13, 2023 | "Float Play" | Kaai Yuki | YouTube |
| August 8, 2023 | "Relayouter" | Kaai Yuki | YouTube |
| October 6, 2023 | "Denki Yohou" | Hatsune Miku | YouTube |
| April 19, 2024 | "I'm the Rain" | Kaai Yuki & Hatsune Miku | YouTube |
| December 3, 2024 | "Ipace" | Kaai Yuki | YouTube |
| July 26, 2025 | "Hadal Abyss Zone" | Kaai Yuki | YouTube |
| August 1, 2025 | "Harunanshiki" | Asumi Shuo & Asumi Ririse | YouTube |
| January 26, 2026 | "Spot Late" | Kaai Yuki | YouTube |
| March 8, 2026 | "Yurail" | Tsurumaki Maki | YouTube |

== Awards ==
His song "Relayouter" won first place in the TOP100 rankings at "The VOCALOID Collection ~2023 Summer~" (aka VocaColle), a ceremony hosted by online media site Niconico to celebrate Vocaloid music, held in August 2023. It also charted at number one on a Niconico VOCALOID TOP20 list from Billboard Japan.
