= Rabbit Hole (song) =

Japanese Vocaloid song

Single by Deco*27

from the album Transform (Single Collection)
- Language: Japanese
- Released: May 19, 2023
- Genre: J-pop; dance-rock
- Length: 2:42
- Songwriter: Deco*27
- Composer: Deco*27

Deco*27 singles chronology
"Mannequin" (2023)	"Rabbit Hole" (2023)	"Cosmic Rendezvous" (2023)

Music video
- "Rabbit Hole" on YouTube

"Rabbit Hole" (ラビットホール) is a 2023 song written by Japanese music producer Deco*27, featuring Vocaloid virtual singer Hatsune Miku. Additional arrangement was provided by tepe, and kemu performed bass. About ten months after its release, a short fan-made animation of the song, "Pure Pure", went viral and caused the song to have a resurgence outside of Japan.

The song's stems have been made available to the public as part of the "Remix Project" by Dwango.

== Music and lyrics ==
"Rabbit Hole" is a dance-rock-denpa song in a kawaii pop style with a light 4/4 beat, sharp single coil guitar phrases, and heavy backing guitar.

The lyrics depict a girl who obeys her instincts, and compares her to a rabbit.

== Music video ==
A music video for "Rabbit Hole" drawn by Omutatsu was released on May 19, 2023. The music video illustration shows Hatsune Miku dressed as a bunny girl with playing cards on her chest. Aone Komachi of Real Sound described her as a "girl with poison hidden in her sweetness". Glitter typefaces and kawaii elements such as nail polish and dolls also appear in the music video.

== In popular culture ==
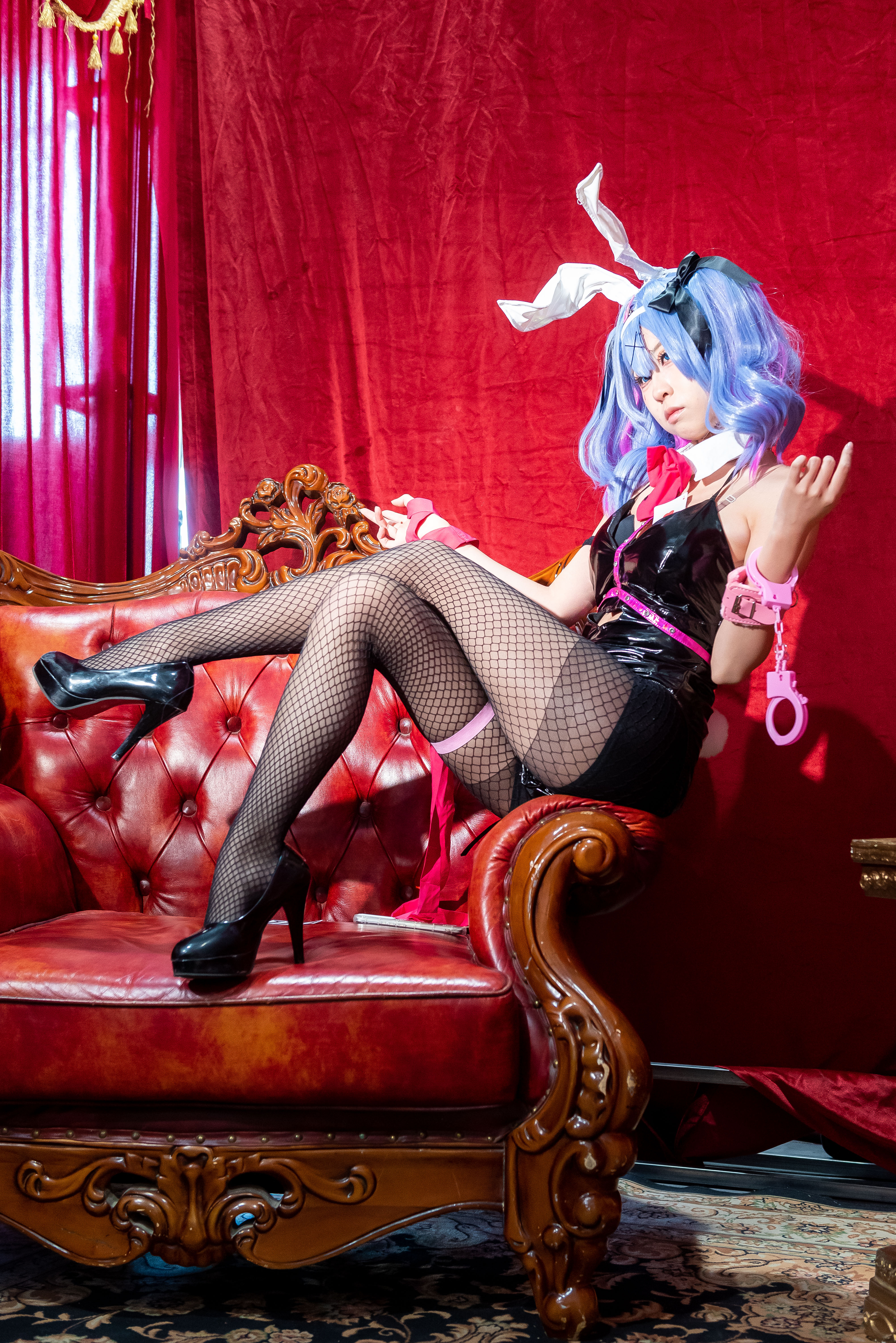
A fan cosplaying Hatsune Miku in the costume she wore in the music video.

On February 7, 2024, a derivative fan animation of the song, "Pure Pure", created by "channel", (Note: Also known as "channelcaststation". Alongside the viral "Pure Pure", channelcaststation previously created a viral fan fanimation for the song "Miku" by Anamanaguchi, as well as a Genshin Impact fan animation featuring characters Hu Tao and Qiqi for the 2024 HoYoFair program titled "Best Funeral Service for You", and did the animation for Mesmerizer, all of which quickly went viral and received viral internet meme statuses due to the viral nature of channel's videos.) rapidly grew popular on X (formerly Twitter), and TikTok, and quickly became the subject of numerous internet memes due to its viral nature.

On March 3, Omutatsu posted a fan art illustration of this song created in collaboration with channel.

== Chart performance ==
The song debuted at number two on the Billboard Japan Niconico Vocaloid Songs Top 20 chart for the week of May 24, 2023, and achieved this ranking again on this chart on October 4, 2023.

Influenced by the "Pure Pure" animation going viral, "Rabbit Hole" rapidly rose in multiple countries' charts. On March 7, 2024, it made its chart debut on the Billboard Global Japan Songs excl. Japan chart, and ranked 16th in the United States and close to the top 20 in South Korea and the United Kingdom. By March 21, on this chart, it ranked 2nd in the United States, 4th in the United Kingdom, 19th in South Korea and Thailand, and 20th in Brazil. It ranked at number four on the Niconico Vocaloid Songs Top 20 chart on March 20. In June 2024, the song ranked 5th on Billboard Japan Niconico Vocaloid Songs for the first half of 2024. The song ranked on Billboard Japan 2024 Niconico Vocaloid Songs Year-end chart at No. 6.

== Release history ==
Release dates for "Rabbit Hole"
Region	Date	Format
World	May 20, 2023	Digital download; streaming
