= God-ish =

Japanese Vocaloid song

Single by PinocchioP

from the album META
- Language: Japanese
- Released: September 19, 2021
- Genre: Electropop
- Length: 3:23
- Label: mui
- Songwriter: PinocchioP

PinocchioP singles chronology
"Non-breath oblige" (2021)	"God-ish" (2021)	"Cosmospice" (2022)

Music video
- "God-ish" on YouTube

"God-ish" (神っぽいな, Kamippoi na) is a 2021 song written by Japanese music producer PinocchioP featuring Vocaloid virtual singer Hatsune Miku. The song is one of the most viewed Vocaloid songs on YouTube, and has been covered by singers such as Ado.

== Lyrics and composition ==
"God-ish" is a fast-paced electropop song. Its vocal range spans from the low note of A3 to the high note of D♯6, which appears before the last refrain.

The song satirizes modern popular trends. The word "God-ish" repeatedly appears in the song lyrics. PinocchioP explained that although someone appears to understand everything, eventually it's just "god-ish", not "god".

The lyrics quote Friedrich Nietzsche's statement "Gott ist tot". PinocchioP expressed his liking for "active nihilism" in an interview, and thought the words aligned with the song title and his mode of thinking.

== Music video ==
A music video for "God-ish" was released on September 17, 2021. The music video features an illustration of Hatsune Miku as a nun with a tongue piercing holding a cigarette. The animation style of music video adopts the popular Vocaloid music videos' style, forming a contrast with the song theme.

== Charts ==
=== Weekly charts ===
Weekly chart performance for "God-ish"
Chart	Peak position
Billboard Japan Japan Top User Generated Songs	1
Billboard Japan Heatseekers Songs	4
Billboard Japan Niconico Vocaloid Songs Top 20	4

=== Half-year charts ===
2024 half-year chart performance for "God-ish"
Chart	Position
Niconico Vocaloid Songs Top 20' Half-year chart (Billboard Japan)	16

=== Year-end charts ===
2022 year-end chart performance for "God-ish"
Chart	Position
Japan Top User Generated Songs (Billboard Japan)	1

2023 year-end chart performance for "God-ish"
Chart	Position
Japan Top User Generated Songs (Billboard Japan)	6
Japan Niconico Vocaloid Songs Top 20 (Billboard Japan)	6

2024 year-end chart performance for "God-ish"
Chart	Position
Japan Top User Generated Songs (Billboard Japan)	6
Japan Niconico Vocaloid Songs Top 20 (Billboard Japan)	15

== Release history ==
Release dates for "God-ish"
Region	Date	Format	Label
World	September 19, 2021	Digital download; streaming	mui
