= PinocchioP =

Japanese musician and illustrator

PinocchioP ピノキオピー
- Also known as: Kudō Daihakken
- Born: September 15, 1986 (age 40); Saitama Prefecture, Japan
- Genres: Vocaloid; Electronica; Technopop
- Occupations: Songwriter; Illustrator
- Instruments: Vocals; Keyboard
- Years active: 2009–present
- Labels: U/M/A/A (2014–2021) mui (2021 – )
- Website: PinocchioP Official Website (in Japanese)

YouTube information
- Channel: ピノキオピー PINOCCHIOP OFFICIAL CHANNEL
- Years active: 2013 –
- Genre: Music
- Subscribers: 1.68 million
- Views: 905 million
- Last updated: September 23, 2026

PinocchioP (Japanese: ピノキオピー, Hepburn: Pinokiopī; born September 15, 1986) is a Japanese musician, Vocaloid producer, illustrator, and character designer.

Some of his most well-known songs include "Slowmotion", "Magical Girl and Chocolate", "Loveit", "God-ish", "Anonymous M", "Non-breath Oblige", and "Reincarnation Apple", among others.

== Early life and career ==
PinocchioP began releasing VOCALOID music on video-sharing platforms in 2009. He made his album debut in 2010 with the album “Hana ga Nobiru” (花がのびる). His name originates from his first uploaded work, “Hanauta” (花唄), which featured an illustration of Hatsune Miku with an elongated nose resembling Pinocchio. At first, his motivation for creating and posting music came from the thought, "It might be fun if I uploaded something, too."

Originally, music was just a hobby, and he aspired to become a manga artist. However, manga creation became exhausting, and so he turned to composing songs as a form of escapism after encountering the song “Double Lariat” (ダブルラリアット), produced by Agoaniki.

Given that he has always been drawn to electronic sound that explores human themes, PinocchioP was heavily influenced by Double Lariat, which he discovered on Nico Nico Douga. The idea of having Vocaloids perform band-style music with human-like lyrics left a lasting impression on him. Today, his work covers a wide range of styles, from Vocaloid-driven dance music and Shibuya-style folktronica, to bold, sensational rock.

Pinocchio-P's original characters, such as Aimaina and Dōshite-chan (どうしてちゃん), indicate themes of ambiguity and questioning. As an example, Doushite-chan was created from the curiosity of cutting into unexplained problems. His unique lyrical style is influenced by various sources, including the band Muscle Girl Band, “Garo Monthly Magazine“, and Fujiko Fujio's “Collection of Unique Short Stories“. He has also cited Spitz and Denki Groove as artists that he deeply respects and draws inspiration from.

As Pinocchio-P releases new content each year, he expanded about his activities to include a number of collaborations and live performances.

In 2012, he contributed the song "Gorilla ga Irunda"（ごりらがるんだ）to the arcade game SOUND VOLTEX BOOTH. He also participated as a Vocaloid programming support member for the Vocaloid opera THE END.

In 2013, he provided music for the collaborative concept CD "MikXperience e.p.", which was released alongside the "Xperia feat. HATSUNE MIKU" smartphone. In 2014, he was responsible for the theme song of the "Pentel i+ × Hatsune Miku" collaboration and the "Family Mart × Hatsune Miku Fall Campaign", where he also contributed illustrations for limited-edition merchandise.

In 2014, he composed the theme song "Hajimemashite Chikyūjin-san" (初めまして、地球人さん；Nice to Meet You, Mr. Earthling) for the Nintendo 3DS game Hatsune Miku: Project Mirai DX, which was released in 2015. On that same year, he launched his first solo live concert as a tribute to the climax of his steadily growing live performance career, releasing a song called "Matsuri da Hey Come On" (祭りだHey Come On; It's Matsuri, Hey Come On!), as a recording of the event. His live performances are known for an innovative approach, where he layers his own live singing over Hatsune Miku's voice.

In January 2016, he provided character illustrations for PRIUS! IMPOSSIBLE GIRLS, a project that anthropomorphized parts of the Toyota Prius.

In January 2020, he launched his solo project "Kudō Daihakken" (工藤大発見). Under this name, instead of using Vocaloid, he performs vocals using his own voice.

== Discography ==
Top-hits based on the Oricon Weekly Chart.

=== Albums ===
==== Major albums ====
Rank	Release date	Title	Standard part number		Top-ranking
Rank	Release date	Title	First press limited edition	Regular edition	Top-ranking
1st	July 4, 2012	Obscure Questions	– -	QWCE-00234	19
2nd	May 17, 2023	META	MUI-0002		20
3rd	February 27, 2019	ZERO-GO (零号)	UMA-1118		50
4th	November 23, 2016	HUMAN	UMA-9086-9088	UMA-1086	39
5th	August 11, 2021	LOVE (ラヴ)	MUI-0001		31
