= Maisondes =

Japanese musical project

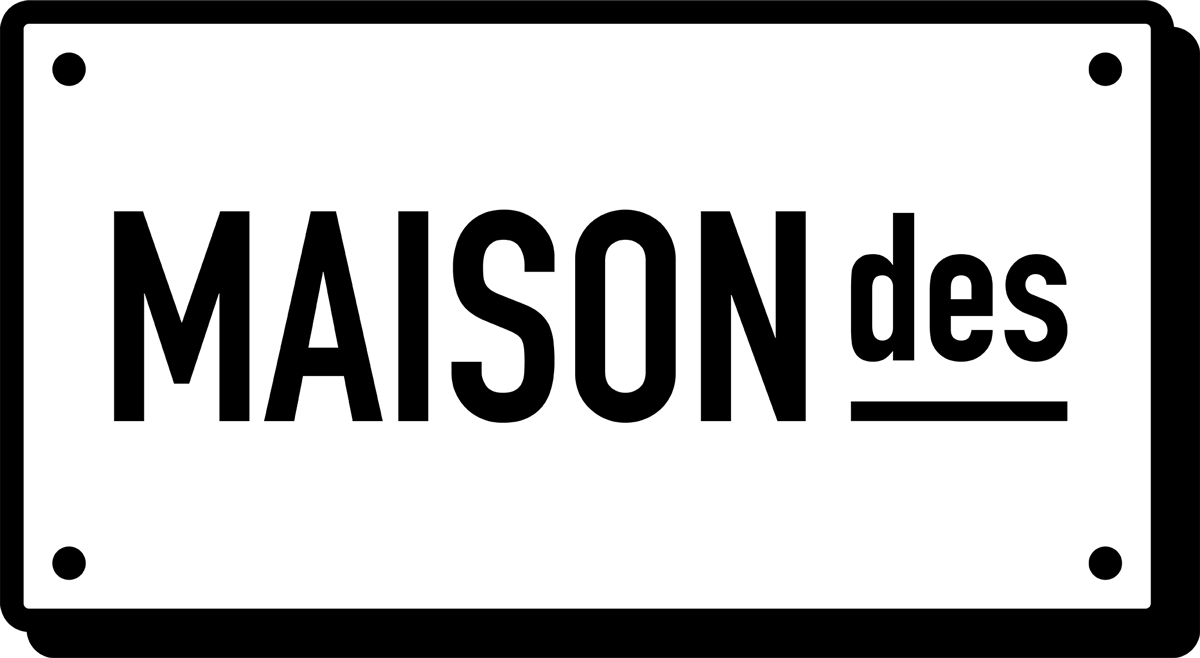
- Logo of Maisondes

Background information
- Origin: Japan
- Genre: J-pop
- Years active: 2021–present
- Labels: Mastersix Foundation; Echoes
- Spinoffs: Nichimezo
- Members: Manager
- Website: maisondes-6half.com

Maisondes (stylized as MAISONdes; Japanese pronunciation: [med͡zoɴ.de]) is a Japanese musical project formed in 2021. With the Manager as the only permanent member, the project explores the concept of songs created and performed by different songwriters and singers, who act as residents in a fictional 6.5-tatami (10.53 square meters) apartment.

The project is best known for its 2021 single, "Yowanehaki", featuring Asmi and Wanuka, and theme songs for the second anime adaptation of the manga series Urusei Yatsura. Outside of regular works, Maisondes partnered with Weekly Shōnen Sunday for the spinoff project Nichimezo (日曜日のメゾンデ, Nichiyōbi no Mezonde) to perform songs based on the magazine's manga.

== History ==
Planned in 2020 with an undecided name, on January 25, 2021, a music video for the "Bedroom" version of "Hello/Hello" (101) by an unidentified artist named Maisondes, featuring vocals by Yama, and written by Nakimushi, was uploaded to Yama's YouTube channel. The full version of the song was later released to digital music and streaming platforms on February 3, and also featured on the first episode of 7-Eleven Japan's original net animation Rainbow Finder.

The project's fifth single, "Yowanehaki" (102), featuring vocals from Asmi and composition by Wanuka, was released on May 19. The song gained popularity on short-form video social media TikTok, which topped the Billboard Japan's TikTok Weekly Top 20 for four consecutive weeks, was one of the most popular track on the platform in Japan in 2021, and won the 2021 TikTok Buzzword Awards in Music Category. Commercially, the song reached number 13 and 14 on the Billboard Japan Hot 100 and the Oricon Combined Singles Chart, respectively, and was certified platinum for surpassing 100 million streams by the Recording Industry Association of Japan (RIAJ).

From 2022 to 2024, Maisondes produced all opening and ending themes for the second anime adaptation of the manga series Urusei Yatsura (1978–1987). The songs consist of "Aiue" (373; featuring Minami and Sakuramoti) and "Tokyo Shandy Rendez-vous" (239; featuring Kaf and Tsumiki) for the first cour; "Love Trap Muchū" (333; featuring Asmi and Threee) and "Not Enough" (210; featuring Yama and Nito) for the second cour; "Lock-On" (609; featuring Hashimero and Megurimeguru) and "Sakura Blossom" (397; featuring 9Lana and Sakuramoti) for the third cour; and "By My Darling" (039; featuring Miki Maria and Nito) and "You Make Me Feel Spring" (430; featuring Ayuni D and Nito) for the final cour.

Maisondes released their first EP, titled Noisy Room, on March 15, 2023, which features themes from the first two cours of Urusei Yatsura. Later, all the anime's themes featured on the project's compilation album, Noisy Love Room – Maisondes × Uruseiyatsura Complete Collection, issued on June 5, 2024. The project's other tie-ups include "Infinite" (888; featuring Sorane and Meiyo) for Toyota Corolla commercial, "Wannabe" (322; featuring Hoshimachi Suisei and Sukuma) for anime series Trapezium (2024), "Popcorn!!" (1101; featuring Narumiya and Sasuke Haraguchi) to commemorate the 50th anniversary of Hello Kitty, and "Bake no Kawa" (800; featuring Kobo Kanaeru, Kasane Teto, Giga, and TeddyLoid) for anime series Gnosia (2025).

In 2024, Maisondes was transferred from Mastersix Foundation to the newly established label and management, Echoes. The next year, Echoes and Weekly Shōnen Sunday announced a partnership to launch a project as a sub-unit of Maisondes, Nichimezo (日曜日のメゾンデ, Nichiyōbi no Mezonde; lit. 'Monday's Maisondes'), to contribute songs based on manga published on Weekly Shōnen Sunday and its webcomic platform Sunday Webry, with Rei (former member of Tuyu) as the fixed vocalists for the project. Its debut single, "Modoki Step", was released on March 19, based on the Sunday Webry manga Nisemono Kyōkai and featuring the composition by Masadara.

== Artistry ==
The name Maisondes comes from the French words maison des, meaning "the house of...". Musician and Vocaloid producer WhaleDontSleep advised the project's titling and formatting. The project's concept "six-and-a-half-tatami apartment somewhere" is taken from a lyric of Yama's song "Haru o Tsugeru", "shin'ya Tōkyō no roku-jō han" (深夜東京の6畳半; lit. 'A 6.5-tatami room in late-night Tokyo'). The Manager is listed as the only permanent member of the project, who taking a role of recruitment musicians for the project, or "looking for new residents."

Assigned a room number, the project's songs are created and performed by different songwriters and singers, mostly teenagers and young adults, who act as residents of the apartment. The lyrics generally express "loneliness" and "gloominess" of young people in a small room in a city. The Manager described its genre a "6.5-tatami pop music", an updated version of the 1970s 4.5-tatami folk music. Illustrator Nakaki Pantz is in charge of all the project's visuals, which the music videos are animation and begin with the door opening. Maisondes also contributed the series "Re:Maisondes" for remix songs and "Dig:Maisondes" for cover songs.

== Members ==
- Manager (管理人, kanrinin)

== Discography ==
=== Compilation albums ===
List of compilation albums, showing selected details, chart positions, and sales
Title	Details	Peaks		Sales
Title	Details	JPN	JPN Hot	Sales
Noisy Love Room – Maisondes × Uruseiyatsura Complete Collection	Released: June 5, 2024; Label: Mastersix Foundation; Formats: CD, DL, streaming	25	26	JPN: 1,558

=== Extended plays ===
List of extended plays, showing selected details, chart positions, and sales
Title	Details	Peak positions			Sales
Title	Details	JPN	JPN Cmb.	JPN Hot	Sales
Noisy Room	Released: March 15, 2023; Label: Mastersix Foundation; Formats: CD, DL, streaming	29	44	30	JPN: 1,894

=== Singles ===
List of singles, showing year released, selected chart positions, certifications, and album name
No.	Title	Year	Peak positions			Certifications	Album
No.	Title	Year	JPN	JPN Cmb.	JPN Hot	Certifications	Album
101	"Hello/Hello" (featuring Yama and Nakimusho)	2021	—	—	—		Non-album singles
310	"For Ten Minutes, For a Hundred Yen" (featuring Moka Satō and WhaleDontSleep)	2021	—	—	—		Non-album singles
000	"Hontō wa Yoru no Hashi made" (featuring OOO and WhaleDontSleep)	2021	—	—	—		Non-album singles
301	"Irenai" (featuring Miu Dōmura, 301, and Geg)	2021	—	—	—		Non-album singles
102	"Yowanehaki" (featuring Wanuka and Asmi)	2021	—	14	13	RIAJ: Platinum (st.)	Non-album singles
103	"Dance Dance Dada" (featuring Ema and Tanaka)	2021	—	—	—		Non-album singles
308	"Grumpy" (featuring Haruno and Aqu3ra)	2021	—	—	—		Non-album singles
107	"Melt in Late Summer" (featuring Riria and Nagumoyuuki)	2021	—	—	—		Non-album singles
111	"Rally, Rally" (featuring Pii and Meiyo)	2021	—	—	—		Non-album singles
201	"Bed Hair" (featuring Kohana Lam and Zettakun)	2022	—	—	—		Non-album singles
302	"Cheers" (featuring Tani Yuuki and Kei Sugawara)	2022	—	—	—		Non-album singles
032	"You Don't Understand" (featuring Atashi and Zumita)	2022	—	—	—		Non-album singles
Dig:001	"Juice Box" (featuring Aruma and Kksi)	2022	—	—	—		Non-album singles
417	"Color of Cardboard Box" (featuring 4na and Mossa)	2022	—	—	—		Non-album singles
373	"Aiue" (featuring Minami and Sakuramoti)	2022	27	13	63		Noisy Room and Noisy Love Room
239	"Tokyo Shandy Rendez-vous" (featuring Kaf and Tsumiki)	2022	27	13	21	RIAJ: Platinum (st.)	Noisy Room and Noisy Love Room
888	"Infinite" (featuring Sorane and Meiyo)	2022	—	—	—		Non-album singles
245	"I Like You" (featuring Aimer and Wanuka)	2023	—	—	—		Non-album singles
333	"Love Trap Muchū" (featuring Asmi and Threee)	2023	—	—	—		Noisy Room and Noisy Love Room
210	"Not Enough" (featuring Yama and Nito)	2023	—	—	—		Noisy Room and Noisy Love Room
128	"That's Enough" (featuring Kankan and Hynome)	2023	—	—	—		Noisy Room and Noisy Love Room
610	"Toraenohime" (featuring Muto and Sohbana)	2023	—	—	—		Noisy Room and Noisy Love Room
349	"Show Me Your Phone" (featuring Hashimero and Maeshima Soshi)	2023	—	—	—		Non-album singles
832	"You Were Wet" (featuring Aizawa and Shikiura Sōgo)	2023	—	—	—		Non-album singles
XYZ	"A Lonely Night (Lonely Get Wild)" (featuring Ainy and Red)	2023	—	—	—		Non-album singles
900	"Bathroom" (featuring Ren and Maeshima Soshi)	2023	—	—	—		Non-album singles
404	"Double Push Off" (featuring Suisoh and A4)	2023	—	—	—		Non-album singles
609	"Lock-On" (featuring Hashimero and Megurimeguru)	2024	36	—	—		Noisy Love Room
397	"Sakura Blossom" (featuring 9Lana and Sakuramoti)	2024	36	—	—		Noisy Love Room
1101	"Popcorn!!" (featuring Hello Kitty, Narumiya, and Sasuke Haraguchi)	2024	—	—	—		Non-album single
430	"You Make Me Feel Spring" (featuring Ayuni D and Nito)	2024	—	—	—		Noisy Love Room
039	"By My Darling" (featuring Miki Maria and Nito)	2024	—	—	—		Noisy Love Room
322	"Wannabe" (featuring Hoshimachi Suisei and Sukuma)	2024	—	—	—		Trapezium Original; Soundtrack
202	"Pain, Pain, Go Away" (featuring Yuika and Kafuné)	2024	—	—	—		Non-album singles
†††	"Alibi Game" (featuring Noa and Kayayu)	2024	—	—	—		Non-album singles
365	"I Want" (featuring Yuri and Hashimero)	2024	—	—	—		Non-album singles
717	"Träumerei" (featuring Isekaijoucho and Issey)	2025	—	—	—		Non-album singles
334	"Unspoken Days" (featuring Kano and Mimi)	2025	—	—	—		Non-album singles
800	"Bake no Kawa" (featuring Kobo Kanaeru, Kasane Teto, Giga, and TeddyLoid)	2025	—	—	—		Gnosia Original; Soundtrack
420	"Ash＆Ember" (featuring Lisa and Nanahoshi Kangengakudan)	2026	—	—	—		Non-album single
"—" denotes releases that did not chart or were not released in that region.

==== Nichimezo ====
List of singles, showing year released and album name
Title	Year	Album
"Modoki Step" (with Rei and Masadara)	2025	Non-album singles
"Pretender" (with Rei and Daibakuhashin)	2025	Non-album singles
"Beautiful Ugly World" (with Rei and Sakuma)	2025	Non-album singles
"A Miracle Worthy of You" (with Rei and WhaleDontSleep)	2025	Non-album singles
"Colorful Palette" (with Rei and Furu_ri)	2025	Non-album singles
"You" (with Rei and Twinfield)	2025	Non-album singles
"Bakebake" (with Rei and Nayutan Seijin)	2025	Non-album singles
"Rhapsody of Lies" (with Rei and Akasaki)	2025	Non-album singles
"Enormous Frontier" (with Rei and Satsuki)	2025	Non-album singles
"Love Says So" (with Rei and Tomoya Tabuchi)	2026	Non-album singles
"Day by Day" (with Rei and Meiyo)	2026	Non-album singles
"Eyes" (with Rei and Hynome)	2026	Non-album singles
"The Scent of Roses" (with Rei and Minami)	2026	Non-album singles
"Luv Ya Now" (with Rei, Parkgolf, and Emi Okamoto)	2026	Non-album singles

=== Guest appearances ===
List of non-single guest appearances, showing year released, other performing artists, and album name
Title	Artist	Year	Album
"Azuki Arai"	2026	Lisa and Kenmochi Hidefumi	Lace Up

== Concerts ==
- Maisondes Live #1 (2023)
- Maisondes Live #2 (2024)
- Maisondes Live Room to Room (2025)
- Maisondes Live #3 (2026)

== Awards and nominations ==
Name of the award ceremony, year presented, award category, nominee(s) of the award, and the result of the nomination
Award ceremony	Year	Category	Nominee(s)/work(s)	Result	Ref.
Japan Gold Disc Award	2023	Best 5 New Artists (Japan)	Maisondes	Won	
TikTok Buzzword Awards	2021	Music Category	"Yowanehaki"	Won	
