= Crying for Rain =

"Kawaki wo Ameku"

Song by Minami
- Released: January 30, 2019
- Recorded: 2018
- Genre: J-pop, pop rock
- Length: 4:11
- Label: FlyingDog
- Songwriter: Minami
- Producer: Makoto Nishibe

Minami singles chronology
"Main Actor" (2017)	"Kawaki wo Ameku" (2019)	"Ame wo Matsu" (2020)

"Kawaki wo Ameku" (カワキヲアメク, lit. "Crying for Rain") is a debut single recorded by Japanese singer-songwriter Minami. It was released on January 30, 2019, through the FlyingDog record label. The track served as the opening theme song for the anime television series Domestic Girlfriend.

== Background and release ==
Minami signed with FlyingDog after winning the second FlyingDog Audition Grand Prix. "Kawaki wo Ameku" was issued as her debut major-label release. The physical single was distributed in Japan on January 30, 2019, in two editions: a Regular Edition (VTCL-35294) and an Anime Edition (VTCL-35295). Digital streaming and download availability followed on May 29, 2019.

== Composition ==
"Kawaki wo Ameku" is a J-pop and pop-rock song written and composed by Minami. It is the opening of the anime Domestic Girlfriend.

== Commercial performance ==
Upon release, the single debuted at number 14 on the Oricon Weekly Singles Chart, registering approximately 6,000 physical unit sales in its opening week. Due to its track composition across physical variants, it also qualified for digital album rankings on Oricon, peaking at number 1 on the Weekly Digital Albums Chart. It reached a peak of number 10 on the Oricon Digital Singles Chart.

On the Billboard Japan charts, the track entered the Hot Buzz Song chart at number 9.

== Track listing ==
All tracks are written and composed by Minami.

Regular Edition (VTCL-35294)
No.	Title	Length
1.	"Kawaki wo Ameku" (カワキヲアメク)	4:11
2.	"main actor"	5:31
3.	"Lilac" (ライラック)	5:02
4.	"Hollowness" (ホロネス)	5:17
Total length:		19:59

Anime Edition (VTCL-35295)
No.	Title	Length
1.	"Kawaki wo Ameku" (カワキヲアメク)	4:12
2.	"main actor"	5:31
3.	"Lilac" (ライラック)	5:03
4.	"Prologue" (プロローグ)	5:31
Total length:		20:17
