= Urusei Yatsura (2022 TV series) =

Japanese anime television series

- Promotional poster that features a group of characters chasing Ataru Moroboshi with Lum in the foreground
- Based on: Urusei Yatsura by Rumiko Takahashi
- Written by: Yūko Kakihara
- Directed by: Takahiro Kamei; Hideya Takahashi; Yasuhiro Kimura
- Voices of: Hiroshi Kamiya; Sumire Uesaka; Maaya Uchida; Mamoru Miyano; Wataru Takagi; Miyuki Sawashiro
- Theme music composer: Maisondes
- Composer: Masaru Yokoyama
- Country of origin: Japan
- Original language: Japanese
- No. of seasons: 2
- No. of episodes: 46 (83 segments)

Production
- Executive producers: Atsuhiro Iwakami; Genichi Kimura; Hisashi Ishiwata; Nobumasa Sawabe; Ryō Fujita; Shuichirō Tanaka; Yasushi Kuwata
- Producers: Noriko Fujimoto; Shuuhou Kondou; Kazuki Ooshima; Yoshinori Takeeda; Masaki Hasebe
- Cinematography: Yuichiro Osada
- Animator: David Production
- Editor: Kiyoshi Hirose
- Running time: 22 minutes
- Production companies: Fuji Television; Aniplex; Shogakukan; Shogakukan-Shueisha Productions; FCC; Dentsu; David Production

Original release
- Network: Fuji Television (Noitamina)
- Release: October 14, 2022 – June 21, 2024

Related
- Urusei Yatsura (1981)

Urusei Yatsura (うる星やつら) is a Japanese anime television series produced by David Production based on the manga series of the same name by Rumiko Takahashi. It is the second television anime adaptation of the manga, following the 1981 adaptation by Studio Pierrot and Studio Deen that ran until 1986. The series aired from October 2022 to June 2024 on Fuji Television's Noitamina programming block, and ran for 46 episodes across two split two-cour seasons, with most episodes having two segments per half-hour.

== Production and release ==
On January 1, 2022, another animated television adaptation of Urusei Yatsura was announced via a full-page ad on the Sankei Shimbun, followed by a full reveal that same day via a promotional video, which revealed the show's cast and staff. The series would commemorate the original manga publisher Shogakukan's 100th anniversary. The series premiered on Fuji Television's Noitamina programming block on October 14, 2022 (exactly 41 years after the original series premier). The series is produced by David Production and chief directed by Takahiro Kamei, Hideya Takahashi, and Yasuhiro Kimura, with Yūko Kakihara as head writer, character designs and season 1 chief animation direction by Naoyuki Asano, and Masaru Yokoyama composing the music. The series was announced for 46 full-length episodes of four cours, split into two seasons. Sentai Filmworks has licensed the series in North America, Europe, Oceania, and selected Latin American and Asian territories. The second season of the series premiered on January 12, 2024. On March 1, 2023, Hidive released an English dub of the anime's first season.

== Theme songs ==
One opening and one ending theme songs were used per cour, and are all performed by the collaboration band Maisondes. For the first cour (episodes 1–11), the opening theme song is "Aiue" (アイウエ) featuring Minami and Sakuramoti, while the ending theme song is "Tokyo Shandy Rendezvous" (トウキョウ・シャンディ・ランデヴ, Tōkyō・Shandi・Randevu) featuring Kaf and Tsumiki. For the second cour (episodes 12–23), the opening theme song is "Love Trap Muchu" (アイワナムチュー, Aiwanamchū) featuring Asmi and Surii, while the ending theme song is "Not Enough" (アイタリナイ, Aitarinai) featuring Yama and Nito. For the third cour (episodes 24–35), the opening theme song is "Lock-On" (ロックオン, Rokku-On) featuring Hashimero and Meguru, while the ending theme song is "Thunder Blossom" (雷櫻, Kaminarizakura) featuring 9Lana and Sakuramoti. For the final cour, the opening theme song is "By My Darling" (バイマイダーリン) featuring Mikimaria and Nito, while the ending theme song is "Haru Magai" (春紛い) featuring Ayuni D and Nito.

== Episodes ==
Season	Cour	Episodes	Original run	Theme songs	
Season	Cour	Episodes	Original run	Opening	Ending
1	1	11	October 14 − December 23, 2022	"Aiue" by Minami and Sakuramoti	"Tokyo Shandy Rendezvous" by Kaf and Tsumiki
1	2	12	January 6 − March 24, 2023	"Love Trap Muchu" by Asmi and Surii	"Not Enough" by Yama and Nito
2	3	12	January 12 − March 29, 2024	"Lock-On" by Hashimero and Meguru	"Thunder Blossom" by 9Lana and Sakuramoti
2	4	11	April 12 − June 21, 2024	"By My Darling" by Mikimaria and Nito	"Haru Magai" by Ayuni D and Nito

=== Season 1 (2022–23) ===
No. overall	No. in season	Title	Directed by (Note: Production staff information is taken from the ending credits of each episode)	Written by	Chief animation direction by	Original release date (Note: Advance screenings were held every Saturday and Sunday at the Noitamina Shop)
1	1	"Young Love on the Run"; Transliteration: "Kakemeguru Seishun" (Japanese: かけめぐる青春)	Hideya Takahashi	Yūko Kakihara	Naoyuki Asano & Satoru Kiyomaru	October 14, 2022
1	1	"Between a Rock and a Hard Place"; Transliteration: "Zettai Zetsumei" (Japanese: 絶体絶命)	Directed by : Hideya Takahashi; Storyboarded by : Takahiro Kamei	Yūko Kakihara	Naoyuki Asano & Satoru Kiyomaru	October 14, 2022
When aliens from the planet Oni come to invade Earth, Ataru Moroboshi is chosen to save his planet if he wins a game of tag against their princess, Lum. After succeeding, due to a misunderstanding, Lum thinks that Ataru has proposed to her, much to his girlfriend Shinobu Miyake's irritation. Lum tries to thwart Ataru and Shinobu's attempts at communicating, resulting in chaos and destruction in the city.
2	2	"Present for You"; Transliteration: "Anata ni Ageru" (Japanese: あなたにあげる)	Yasuhiro Kimura	Yūko Kakihara	Naoyuki Asano	October 21, 2022
2	2	"The Yellow Ribbon of Happiness"; Transliteration: "Shiawase no Kiiroi Ribon" (Japanese: 幸せの黄色いリボン)	Yasuhiro Kimura	Yūko Kakihara	Naoyuki Asano	October 21, 2022
Lum insists on spending time with Ataru in school, angering Shinobu and making his life miserable. While trying to go into hiding, he meets a shrine maiden named Sakura who insists on performing an exorcism on him. Ataru receives from Cherry, a wandering monk, a yellow ribbon that strips Lum of her powers when it is tied around her horns. Although effective, it also causes its own set of strife and misery for the fastener. Later, a young man named Shuutaro Mendo parachutes into the city.
3	3	"Trouble Rains Down!!"; Transliteration: "Toraburu wa Maiorita!!" (Japanese: トラブルは舞い降りた！！)	Takahiro Kamei	Yūko Kakihara	Naoyuki Asano & Ryo Kobayashi	October 28, 2022
3	3	"Amazed in a Maze"; Transliteration: "Meiro de Meromero" (Japanese: 迷路でメロメロ)	Takahiro Kamei	Yūko Kakihara	Naoyuki Asano & Ryo Kobayashi	October 28, 2022
New transfer student, Shutarō Mendō, is instantly popular with the class' girls but disliked by the boys who set Ataru as his opponent for class president. Since the class is equally divided between male and female students, the election ends in a draw, and Shutarō decides to settle the result with a duel. During a class outing, Lum, Ataru, Shinobu, and Shutarō explore a cavern hoping to spend time alone with their romantic interest, unaware that a weird love square has developed between them. The two boys plot together to split the group, but things don't go as planned, and Shutarō reveals a secret about himself. Something concealed in the cavern is revealed when Lum uses her powers to light the way after they get lost.
4	4	"Sealed with a Kiss!!"; Transliteration: "Kuchizuke Totomoni Chigiran!!" (Japanese: 口づけと共に契らん！！)	Directed by : Kyōhei Suzuki; Storyboarded by : Takahiro Kamei	Yūko Kakihara	Naoyuki Asano & Ryo Kobayashi	November 4, 2022
While Lum, Shinobu, Ataru, and Shutarō play tennis, a group of crows carries a coffin-like object out of the spaceship seen launching in the previous episode. The "coffin" slides downhill and crashes into the tennis court, where the crows reveal that the woman sleeping inside is their princess, Kurama. After learning that they are looking for a one-time-mating partner for their princess, Ataru manages to awaken her with a kiss, thus sealing the deal. However, Kurama believes she was kissed by Shutarō, and then Ataru's stubbornness and the crows' meddling cause her to question her people's traditions.
5	5	"The Glove of Love and Conflict"; Transliteration: "Ai to Tōkon no Gurōbu" (Japanese: 愛と闘魂のグローブ)	Directed by : Shugo Tsuneoka; Storyboarded by : Tomoko Iwasaki	Yūko Kakihara	Naoyuki Asano & Satoru Kiyomaru	November 11, 2022
5	5	"How I've Waited for You…"; Transliteration: "Kimi Matedomo…" (Japanese: 君待てども…)	Directed by : Shugo Tsuneoka; Storyboarded by : Tomoko Iwasaki	Yūko Kakihara	Naoyuki Asano & Satoru Kiyomaru	November 11, 2022
The school hires Sakura as the new nurse, causing a commotion among male students. The PE teachers ask her to exorcise a pair of boxing gloves, but Cherry and Kotetsu-Neko make one of the gloves go flying and hit Lum. Later, Ataru ends up wearing both gloves which results in much grief for him, but also Lum's delight. Shutarō's male classmates are jealous of all the love letters he gets from the female students. Some of them decide to take him down a notch by making Ataru gloat with a fake love letter. However, Ataru bets the class president's position on whether the letter is real or not. Terrified at the idea of having Shutarō as class president, the conspirators try to fix things, but it doesn't go as planned. Lum finds out the truth, and feeling neglected by Ataru, decides to let him learn a lesson but can't help feeling sorry for him. Later, Lum receives a message from her father, reminding her that they have a big showdown with a rival clan.
6	6	"Good Day for a Departure"; Transliteration: "Ihi Tabidachi" (Japanese: いい日旅立ち)	Directed by : Koichi Chigira; Storyboarded by : Hiroshi Hara	Yūko Kakihara	Naoyuki Asano & Satoru Kiyomaru	November 18, 2022
6	6	"Oyuki" (Japanese: お雪)	Directed by : Koichi Chigira; Storyboarded by : Hiroshi Hara	Yūko Kakihara	Naoyuki Asano & Satoru Kiyomaru	November 18, 2022
6	6	"Ataru Retires"; Transliteration: "Ataru no Intai" (Japanese: あたるの引退)	Directed by : Koichi Chigira; Storyboarded by : Hiroshi Hara	Yūko Kakihara	Naoyuki Asano & Satoru Kiyomaru	November 18, 2022
Lum brings Ataru to her home planet through a portal to battle with the Fukujin alien clan. There he flirts with Lum's childhood friend Benten of the Fukujin and faces punishment for making the Oni lose. Believing that Ataru is dead, his parents and Cherry perform a ritual to guide his soul to the afterlife. Bedridden with a cold, Ataru is visited by his classmates Shinobu, Shutarō, Satoshi (Megane/Eyeglasses), Kōsuke (Perm), and Akira (Chibi). After finding an interdimensional portal Lum left open in Ataru's room closet, they are brought to Neptune by another of Lum's childhood friends named Oyuki. On the day before the school's Summer Break starts, Ataru announces to the class that he is retiring, which results in everybody else squabbling to become the show's new main character, when in reality he just wants to retire from his position as Class President.
7	7	"Home Is Where You Find It"; Transliteration: "Sumeba to" (Japanese: 住めば都)	Junichi Yamamoto	Yūko Kakihara	Naoyuki Asano & Ryo Kobayashi	November 25, 2022
7	7	"Marine Garbage Disposal"; Transliteration: "Nama Gomi, Umi e" (Japanese: 生ゴミ、海へ)	Junichi Yamamoto	Yūko Kakihara	Naoyuki Asano & Ryo Kobayashi	November 25, 2022
While hanging out with Lum, Shinobu, Shutarō, Cherry, and Sakura at one of the Mendō family's hotels, Ataru finds a water-dwelling yōkai secretly living at the bottom of the pool. After Shutarō kicks it out, the little yōkai finds a new home. While on his way out to the beach with Lum to meet with Shinobu and Shutarō, Ataru is asked by his mother to dispose of the water-yōkai living in their bathtub. At the beach, Sakura is on a date with her fiancé, unaware they are being spied on. Meanwhile, a boy ordered by his mother to get rid of his pet Pochi, carries it around in a box hoping to find someone to adopt it. After abandoning it, it turns out the pet is actually just Cherry. Sometime later, Ataru receives a postcard from the water-yōkai, who has been adopted by the boy.
8	8	"Transfer Student Close Call…"; Transliteration: "Tennyūsei, Kikīppatsu…" (Japanese: 転入生、危機一髪…)	Hisashi Sugawara	Hiroko Kanasugi	Naoyuki Asano & Satoru Kiyomaru	December 2, 2022
8	8	"Farewell Party Close Call…"; Transliteration: "Owakare Pātī Kikīppatsu…" (Japanese: お別れパーティー危機一髪…)	Hisashi Sugawara	Hiroko Kanasugi	Naoyuki Asano & Satoru Kiyomaru	December 2, 2022
Lum enrolls as a student in Ataru's class, nearly causing him to choke to death. During the school's sports festival, Ataru hits on Ran, a childhood friend of Lum, who transferred to the class next door to take revenge over a boy they both liked in the past. A small robot in Ran's likeness tells Lum that Ran has decided to give up on exacting vengeance and to return to her planet. She invites both Lum and Ataru, who is unaware that Ran is an alien, to a farewell party. However, it turns out to be a deception to switch Ataru with a simulacre. The next day at school, Lum meets Ran who again expresses her desire for vengeance. Meanwhile on an alien world, a fearsome creature roars while holding a doll in Lum's likeness.
9	9	"To Kill With Love"; Transliteration: "Ai de Koroshitai" (Japanese: 愛で殺したい)	Yutaka Kagawa	Yuta Suzuki	Naoyuki Asano & Satoru Kiyomaru	December 9, 2022
9	9	"Studying Mayhem"; Transliteration: "Jishū Sōdō" (Japanese: 自習騒動)	Yutaka Kagawa	Yuta Suzuki	Naoyuki Asano & Satoru Kiyomaru	December 9, 2022
Lum's ex-fiancé, Rei, comes to Earth to propose to her. Although he transforms into a huge beast when upset, he is incredibly handsome in his normal state. However, Lum categorically turns him down because she can't stand his gluttony. After a failed attempt to win Lum over and burning with jealousy, Rei chases Ataru and Lum around the local park, causing much mayhem among couples and food-vendors. Rei shows up at school looking for Lum and food. The girls are charmed by his handsome form, which proves devastating for poor Shutarō. Ran, who is in love with Rei, finds herself fighting for his attention with Lum and even Cherry. When Lum and Ataru return home, Rei has also charmed Mrs. Moroboshi. Later on, Ataru's parents and Lum's mother prepare for the upcoming parent's day at school.
10	10	"Parents' Day Horrors"; Transliteration: "Senritsu no Sankanbi" (Japanese: 戦慄の参観日)	Directed by : Shugo Tsuneoka; Storyboarded by : Minoru Ohara	Yūko Kakihara	Naoyuki Asano & Ryo Kobayashi	December 16, 2022
10	10	"Since Your Parting"; Transliteration: "Kimi Sarishi Nochi" (Japanese: 君去りし後)	Directed by : Jiro Fujimoto; Storyboarded by : Minoru Ohara	Yūko Kakihara	Naoyuki Asano & Ryo Kobayashi	December 16, 2022
As Ataru and Shinobu's mothers arrive to school for parents day, Shutarō's mother's ox-cart gets crushed by Lum's mother's spaceship. Lum is asked to translate the Mendo matriarch's grievances, since her mother doesn't speak Japanese, but her poor translation skill causes many misunderstandings. Ataru snaps at Lum who disappears, leaving behind a little handmade doll in her image. In the following days, Lum's absence causes quite a stir and has devastating effects on Ataru. Meanwhile, Lum is with her parents renewing her passport, when her father accidentally turns on the microphone she hid in the doll, learning of Ataru's true feelings.
11	11	"Mendo Siblings!!"; Transliteration: "Mendō Kyōdai!!" (Japanese: 面堂兄妹！！)	Directed by : Yumeko Iwaoka; Storyboarded by : Junichi Yamamoto	Hayashi Mori	Naoyuki Asano, Satoru Kiyomaru & Ryo Kobayashi	December 23, 2022
11	11	"A Strange New Year at the Mendo Estate"; Transliteration: "Mendō-tei Shinnen Kai" (Japanese: 面倒邸新年怪)	Directed by : Yumeko Iwaoka; Storyboarded by : Koichi Chigira	Hayashi Mori	Naoyuki Asano, Satoru Kiyomaru & Ryo Kobayashi	December 23, 2022
Shutarō's mischievous younger sister, Ryoko, visits him at school and catches Ataru's interest, causing much mayhem. Ryoko invites Ataru, Lum, and their other friends to the Mendō's family New Year's party, where she prepares a rather twisted board game that ends in a bang.
12	12	"Ten is Here"; Transliteration: "Ten-chan ga Kita" (Japanese: テンちゃんがきた)	Directed by : Tatsuki Yamamoto; Storyboarded by : Tomoko Iwasaki	Hiroko Kanasugi	Naoyuki Asano & Ryo Kobayashi	January 6, 2023
12	12	"A Date for Just the Two of Us"; Transliteration: "Futari Dake no Dēto" (Japanese: ふたりだけのデート)	Directed by : Tatsuki Yamamoto; Storyboarded by : Tomoko Iwasaki	Hiroko Kanasugi	Naoyuki Asano & Ryo Kobayashi	January 6, 2023
Irritated that his parents are overjoyed at having Lum living with them, Ataru storms out of the house and finds her little cousin Ten in the mailbox. Later, they go to Sakura's temple for the New Year, where they meet with Cherry, Shinobu, and Ran, who is working there part-time and does some quick thinking to keep secret that she is an alien. Ataru snaps after Ten foils his attempts at flirting with the girls, and Sakura gets a new admirer. Ataru helps Ten write a love letter to Sakura and plan a date with her. However, things don't go as planned.
13	13	"The Great Off-Campus Snack Battle"; Transliteration: "Kaikui dai Sensō" (Japanese: 買い食い大戦争)	Directed by : Fumihiro Ueno; Storyboarded by : Shinji Itadaki	Yūko Kakihara	Naoyuki Asano & Ryo Kobayashi	January 13, 2023
13	13	"A Gift from Ten!!"; Transliteration: "Ten Kara no Okurimono!!" (Japanese: テンからの贈り物！！)	Directed by : Fumihiro Ueno; Storyboarded by : Shinji Itadaki	Yūko Kakihara	Naoyuki Asano & Ryo Kobayashi	January 13, 2023
The school decides to crakdown on snacking during lunch time, and post teachers at the students' favorite spots to catch them. Ataru leads a resistance which escalates in an all-out war in the shopping district. When the topic of Sakura's fiancé comes up, Ten gives the girls a ball-shaped contraption, which when looked into claims to predict who the viewer is destined to marry. The results turn out to be somewhat unsatisfying... Later, Ten buys a pack of chewing-gum sticks from the same site as the ball.
14	14	"That Mizunokoji Boy"; Transliteration: "Mizunokōji-ka no Otoko" (Japanese: 水乃小路家の男)	Directed by : Junya Enoki & Takahiro Kamei; Storyboarded by : Satoshi Ōsedo	Hayashi Mori	Naoyuki Asano, Satoru Kiyomaru & Ryo Kobayashi	January 20, 2023
14	14	"Love Letter Trouble"; Transliteration: "Toraburu・Retā" (Japanese: トLOVE ル・レター)	Directed by : Yuki Morita; Storyboarded by : Satoshi Ōsedo	Hayashi Mori	Naoyuki Asano, Satoru Kiyomaru & Ryo Kobayashi	January 20, 2023
During a baseball game at the Tomobiki High School's sports tournament, Tobimaro Mizunokoji shows up to challenge Shutarō because of a childhood incident. Tobimaro's skills and meddling from Shutarō's sister, Ryoko, make for a memorable game... One morning, Ryoko walks the Mendō's pet octopuses instead of Shutarō, and receives a challenge letter meant for her brother from Tobimaro. The letter's wording makes her think it's a love letter, but Shutarō is adamantly opposed to a relationship between her and his rival, so she asks for Ataru's help and it ends up in a most unique showdown.
15	15	"Anko Pathos, the Taste of Love?!"; Transliteration: "Anko Kanashi ya, Koi no Aji!?" (Japanese: あんこ悲しや、恋の味！？)	Directed by : Eiichi Kuboyama; Storyboarded by : Shinji Takagi	Yūko Kakihara	Naoyuki Asano & Ryo Kobayashi	January 27, 2023
15	15	"Memories and a Close Call…"; Transliteration: "Omoide Kikīppatsu..." (Japanese: 思い出危機一髪…)	Directed by : Sho Sugawara; Storyboarded by : Shinji Takagi	Yūko Kakihara	Naoyuki Asano & Ryo Kobayashi	January 27, 2023
15	15	"Adverse Effects"; Transliteration: "Kusuriguchi Gai" (Japanese: 薬口害)	Directed by : Sho Sugawara; Storyboarded by : Shinji Takagi	Yūko Kakihara	Naoyuki Asano & Ryo Kobayashi	January 27, 2023
After Rei eats a crumb of taiyaki off Ran's cheek, she mistakes it for a kiss and assumes he is over Lum. At a café with Lum, Ran revisits their childhood and how she constantly got in trouble because of Lum's doing. Shaken by how she wronged her friend, Lum forgets to pay the bill on her way out. Shinobu and Lum see Sakura roasting a newt to make medicine. The girls interest awakes when Sakura mentions it can be used to make a love potion. The concoction ends up looking as candy, and Lum gets Ataru to eat one with mixed results.
16	16	"Family Feud!!"; Transliteration: "Gekitō, Oyakodaka!!" (Japanese: 激闘、父子鷹(おやこだか)!!)	Directed by : Daisuke Kurose; Storyboarded by : Masayoshi Nishida	Yūko Kakihara	Naoyuki Asano & Satoru Kiyomaru	February 3, 2023
16	16	"Hello, Sailor Suit!!"; Transliteration: "Sērāfukuyo, Konnichiwa!!" (Japanese: セーラー服よ、こんにちは!!)	Directed by : Yukio Kuroda; Storyboarded by : Tomoko Iwasaki	Yūko Kakihara	Naoyuki Asano & Satoru Kiyomaru	February 3, 2023
On one of the last days of Summer, Lum, Shinobu, Ataru, and Shutarō meet the Fujinami family, a father and a teenager, running the only open seaside café on the beach. The teen, named Ryunosuke, doesn't want to take over the family business which causes conflict with the father. Ataru and Shutarō decide to leave until they find out Ryunosuke is a girl, but their attempts at flirting are unsuccessful. The group then try to get parent and child to solve their issues peacefully, only to cause more mayhem. After destroying their seaside café, Ryunosuke and her father get a live-in job at the Tomobiki High School's supply store. Ryunosuke enrolls as a student but her popularity with the girls irritates Ataru and his classmates. In the hopes of turning things around, they buy her a school's sailor uniform after 'convincing' her father. To learn how to be more feminine first, Ryunosuke writes a friendship letter to Ran, who thinks it's a love letter and that she is dealing with a boy. They go on a date that gets disrupted by Ataru.
17	17	"A Chest Full of Longing!!"; Transliteration: "Akogare wo Mune Ni!!" (Japanese: あこがれを胸に!!)	Directed by : Shugo Tsuneoka; Storyboarded by : Minoru Ohara	Hiroko Kanasugi	Naoyuki Asano & Ryo Kobayashi	February 10, 2023
17	17	"Wish Upon a Star"; Transliteration: "Hoshi ni Negai wo" (Japanese: 星に願いを)	Directed by : Shugo Tsuneoka; Storyboarded by : Minoru Ohara	Hiroko Kanasugi	Naoyuki Asano & Ryo Kobayashi	February 10, 2023
Ryunosuke decides to buy her first bra. She meets Shinobu who is being stalked by delinquents from Butsumetsu High. After learning that the delinquents' bossman is hopelessly in love with her, Shinobu goes on a date with Ryunosuke in the hopes of making the unwanted admirer give up on her, with Ryunosuke wanting to use the money given to her for the job to buy a bra. Ataru, as usual, can't resist interfering. During dinner at the Moroboshi's, a shooting star crashes in the house and introduces itself as the Wishing Star, offering three wishes. After the first two wishes are wasted, deciding on the remaining wish brings much strife to the family.
18	18	"Indelible Lipstick Magic!!"; Transliteration: "Kienai Rūju Majikku!!" (Japanese: き・え・な・いルージュマジック!!)	Directed by : Yumeko Iwaoka; Storyboarded by : Keiichi Sasajima	Hayashi Mori	Naoyuki Asano & Satoru Kiyomaru	February 17, 2023
18	18	"Lethal Attacks! Yaminabe"; Transliteration: "Hissatsu! Yaminabe" (Japanese: 必殺！ヤミナベ)	Directed by : Yumeko Iwaoka; Storyboarded by : Keiichi Sasajima	Hayashi Mori	Naoyuki Asano & Satoru Kiyomaru	February 17, 2023
Lum creates a lipstick that makes people wearing it attracted to each other like magnets. The next day at school, Ataru tries it on Ryunosuke but the whole class ends up wearing it. For the following week's recreational activity, the class votes for 'Yaminabe', involving eating a hot pot casserole in the dark where everyone brings something to throw in. In the following days, Lum makes Ataru eat a spicy Oni dish, and in retaliation, he tries to find out what foods she hates before the Yaminabe.
19	19	"Magic Realm! Jungle of Terror"; Transliteration: "Makyō! Senritsu no Janguru" (Japanese: 魔境！戦慄の密林(ジャングル))	Directed by : Yoshinobu Kasai; Storyboarded by : Yasufumi Soejima	Yuta Suzuki	Naoyuki Asano & Ryo Kobayashi	February 24, 2023
19	19	"Pickled"; Transliteration: "Yopparai Bugi" (Japanese: 酔っぱらいブギ)	Directed by : Yoshinobu Kasai; Storyboarded by : Yasufumi Soejima	Yuta Suzuki	Naoyuki Asano & Ryo Kobayashi	February 24, 2023
Shutarō invites his classmates to meet the Mendō family's prized octopuses. With Ataru in the lead, they insult the most precious octopus on the estate, Matsuchiyo, who runs away with his feelings sorely hurt. They all go to find Matsuchiyo after Shutarō promises a reward for the little octopus' safe return. Ten goes to the school bored and both he and Lum get drunk after eating pickled plums from the students' lunches. Lum proves to be rather unpleasant when intoxicated and flies around the school looking for Ataru. Meanwhile on a spaceship, three alien girls are plotting against Lum, Benten, and Oyuki.
20	20	"Recovering That Which Was Lost"; Transliteration: "Ushinawareta Mono o Motomete" (Japanese: 失われたモノを求めて)	Directed by : Yasuhiro Kimura; Storyboarded by : Tomoko Iwasaki	Hiroko Kanasugi	Naoyuki Asano & Satoru Kiyomaru	March 3, 2023
Benten's chain gets stolen after she gets knocked down while checking on a girl who looked dead. Ten days later, together with Lum and Oyuki, Benten is challenged to a duel by three younger girls from their old middle school who hope to prove they are rowdier. After much pandemonium to get her chain back, Benten reveals why it is so important to her.
21	21	"Cosmo Teacher CAO-2"; Transliteration: "Kosumo Tīchā CAO-2" (Japanese: 惑星教師(コスモティーチャー)CAO-2)	Sho Sugawara	Hayashi Mori	Naoyuki Asano & Ryo Kobayashi	March 10, 2023
21	21	"Ooh, Scary! Voodoo Doll"; Transliteration: "Ana Osoroshi ya, Wara Ningyō" (Japanese: あな恐ろしや、ワラ人形)	Sho Sugawara	Hayashi Mori	Naoyuki Asano & Ryo Kobayashi	March 10, 2023
After learning of a mining operation on a planet with a secret from when they were in elementary school, Oyuki meets with Lum, Benten, and Ran about their revenge attempts on their old robotic teacher, CAO-2. Ryouko makes a voodoo doll of Shutarō and entrusts it to Ataru, which he attempts to reclaim without Ataru learning the truth.
22	22	"Big Bottle, Little Bottle"; Transliteration: "Dai Bin Shō Bin" (Japanese: 大ビン小ビン)	Directed by : Yuichi Nakazawa; Storyboarded by : Koichi Chigira	Yuta Suzuki	Naoyuki Asano, Satoru Kiyomaru & Ryo Kobayashi	March 17, 2023
22	22	"When Love Strikes"; Transliteration: "Ai ga Fureau Toki" (Japanese: 愛がふれあうとき)	Directed by : Yuichi Nakazawa; Storyboarded by : Hideya Takahashi	Yuta Suzuki	Naoyuki Asano, Satoru Kiyomaru & Ryo Kobayashi	March 17, 2023
Ten accidentally shrinks Lum with a jar that makes things smaller. While he rushes to get another jar to turn her back to normal, she tells Ataru that the only way for her to regain her regular size is for him to shower her with love and affection. On her way to school, Shinobu saves a little puppy being bullied by big dogs. The puppy turns out to be a shape-shifting fox who falls in love with her, following her to school. Later, Tomobiki High School's principal decides to hold a contest to crown the Queen of the School, based on beauty, intelligence, personality, skills and strength. The boys in the contest's executive committee have no clear plan to select a winner, but self-proclaimed committee-head Ataru states he will decide.
23	23	"The Tomo-1 Queen Contest"; Transliteration: "Kessen!! Tomo-1 Kuīn Kontesuto" (Japanese: 決戦!!友1クイーンコンテスト)	Directed by : Kiyomitsu Sato & Yūsuke Kubo; Storyboarded by : Yūsuke Kubo & Hideya Takahashi	Hiroko Kanasugi	Naoyuki Asano & Ryo Kobayashi	March 24, 2023
Lum, Shinobu, Sakura, Ran, and Ryunosuke compete in the finals of the Tomo-1 Queen Contest in front of the whole school with Ataru as the presenter, motivated by the "150 thousand yen" prize. The girls take part in several activities, which are primarily just advertisements for stores in the Shopping District. The final challenge is a battle in the boxing ring, so Ran kisses Shinobu, Sakura, and Ryunosuke to significantly weaken them. However, it turns out the girls aren't fighting each other but rather a group of muscular animals. With the three unable to deal with them, Ran is forced to kiss them again to return their strength, allowing everyone to successfully win the battle. The judges award them a tie, greatly annoying the contestants; even further when they realize the "150 thousand yen" they are given to split is just taiyaki. Ataru, meanwhile, runs away with the kickback money from the sponsors.

=== Season 2 (2024) ===
No. overall	No. in season	Title	Directed by	Written by	Chief animation direction by	Original release date
24	1	"Fantasy Bubble Gum"; Transliteration: "Mōsō Fūsen Gamu" (Japanese: 妄想フーセンガム)	Directed by : Shugo Tsuneoka; Storyboarded by : Takahiro Kamei	Hayashi Mori	Naoyuki Asano	January 12, 2024
24	1	"Love Knows No Barriers"; Transliteration: "Ai wa Kokkyō o Koete" (Japanese: 愛は国境を越えて)	Directed by : Eiichi Kuboyama; Storyboarded by : Takahiro Kamei	Hayashi Mori	Satoru Kiyomaru	January 12, 2024
Ataru steals Ten's gum that can create whatever the user imagines when chewing and blowing a bubble. Ataru accidentally hits Lum with a rice cooker on the forehead, causing Lum to not remember speaking Japanese with everyone not understanding her.
25	2	"Trickle of Memories?!"; Transliteration: "Omoide Boroboro!?" (Japanese: 想い出ボロボロ!?)	Directed by : Yumeko Iwaoka; Storyboarded by : Taizō Yoshida	Yuta Suzuki	Naoyuki Asano	January 19, 2024
25	2	"Album of Memories"; Transliteration: "Omoide no Arubamu" (Japanese: 想い出のアルバム)	Directed by : Yumeko Iwaoka; Storyboarded by : Taizō Yoshida	Yuta Suzuki	Ryo Kobayashi	January 19, 2024
25	2	"The Home Visit Blues: Feuding Fujinami Edition"; Transliteration: "Namida no Katei Hōmon: Gekitō no Fujinami Ke-hen" (Japanese: 涙の家庭訪問 激闘の藤波家編)	Directed by : Yumeko Iwaoka; Storyboarded by : Taizō Yoshida	Yuta Suzuki	Ryo Kobayashi	January 19, 2024
Ryunosuke is curious to know about her mother, in which her father thought she was dead. The cast goes through an album to know who Ryunosuke's mother looks like, or so they think. Onsen-Mark does a series of home visit interviews starting with the Fujinami family. It resulted in him getting beaten by Ryunosuke and her father.
26	3	"Electric Jungle"; Transliteration: "Denshoku no Makyō" (Japanese: 電飾の魔境)	Directed by : Fumihiro Ueno; Storyboarded by : Takumi Dōyama	Hayashi Mori	Naoyuki Asano & Satoru Kiyomaru	January 26, 2024
27	4	"Love Thief"; Transliteration: "Koibito Dorobō" (Japanese: 恋人泥棒)	Directed by : Fumio Maezono; Storyboarded by : Miwa Sasaki	Yuta Suzuki	Naoyuki Asano	February 2, 2024
27	4	"That Mizunokoji Girl"; Transliteration: "Mizunokōji-ka no Musume" (Japanese: 水乃小路家の娘)	Directed by : Takahiro Kamei; Storyboarded by : Miwa Sasaki	Yuta Suzuki	Masashi Yamada	February 2, 2024
Kurama once again returns looking for love, this time setting her sights on Ran's crush (and Lum's ex-boyfriend) Rei! Shutarō is arrange to marry Tobimaro's little sister Asuka, which both Shutarō and Tobimaro had no knowledge of her and Asuka is terrified of men.
28	5	"The Continuation of: That Mizunokoji Girl"; Transliteration: "Tsuzuku・Mizunokōji-ka no Musume" (Japanese: 続・水乃小路家の娘)	Directed by : Kiyomitsu Sato; Storyboarded by : Tomoko Iwasaki	Yuta Suzuki	Naoyuki Asano & Ryo Kobayashi	February 9, 2024
The continuation of the arranged marriage and the reason why Asuka is scared of men is due to an absurd tradition of Mizunokoji Family.
29	6	"Kotatsu Love"; Transliteration: "Kotatsu ni Kaketa Ai" (Japanese: コタツにかけた愛)	Directed by : Yuki Morita; Storyboarded by : Kyōhei Ishiguro	Hiroko Kanasugi	Naoyuki Asano	February 16, 2024
29	6	"Lum Becomes a Cow"; Transliteration: "Ramu-chan, Ushi ni Naru" (Japanese: ラムちゃん、ウシになる)	Directed by : Yuki Morita; Storyboarded by : Kyōhei Ishiguro	Hiroko Kanasugi	Satoru Kiyomaru	February 16, 2024
29	6	"The Home Visit Blues: Luxurious Mendo Edition"; Transliteration: "Namida no Katei Hōmon: Kareinaru Mendō Ka-hen" (Japanese: 涙の家庭訪問 華麗なる面堂家編)	Directed by : Yuki Morita; Storyboarded by : Kyōhei Ishiguro	Hiroko Kanasugi	Satoru Kiyomaru	February 16, 2024
30	7	"Eerie Earmuffs"; Transliteration: "Iyāmaffuru no Kai" (Japanese: イヤーマッフルの怪)	Eiichi Kuboyama	Hayashi Mori	Naoyuki Asano	February 23, 2024
30	7	"Family Tree"; Transliteration: "Keizu" (Japanese: 系図)	Eiichi Kuboyama	Hayashi Mori	Ryo Kobayashi	February 23, 2024
Ataru buys two earmuffs that he and Ten put them on, causing them to switch bodies with each other. Ataru is late to school and Lum opens a portal so they get there fast, but they are actually send 10 years into the future. However, they discover something that suggests they won't end up together.
31	8	"Open the Door"; Transliteration: "Tobirawoakete" (Japanese: 扉を開けて)	Shugo Tsuneoka	Hayashi Mori	Naoyuki Asano & Masashi Yamada	March 1, 2024
32a	9a	"Open the Door"; Transliteration: "Tobirawoakete" (Japanese: 扉を開けて)	Directed by : Kyōhei Suzuki; Storyboarded by : Taizō Yoshida	Hayashi Mori	Naoyuki Asano & Satoru Kiyomaru	March 8, 2024
Inaba loses the key fortune where Shinobu, Lum and Ataru uses it that takes them to the space of doors, they go in one of them which they end up back in the future where Ataru is with Shinobu and Lum turns out for some reason with Rei. Inaba informs them this is one of the futures and there are many doors of different futures, one of them where Ran does get with Rei but Lum for some weirdly reason ends up Shutarō. After looking at an apocalyptic mad max-like future that can't be explained, Inaba tells them they can make doorknobs to create new futures and Ataru, Lum and Shinobu create their ideal future but Lum's doorknob gets melted. Ataru finally sees his harem future, but Future Lum leaves Future Ataru after being fed up with him and treating her badly, Ataru realize that getting his harem costed Lum. Ataru and Lum finally discover a future where they do get together.
32b	9b	"The Home Visit Blues: Prohibitive Miyake Edition"; Transliteration: "Namida no Katei Hōmon: Kinji Rareta Miyake Ka-hen" (Japanese: 涙の家庭訪問 禁じられた三宅家編)	Directed by : Kyōhei Suzuki; Storyboarded by : Taizō Yoshida	Hayashi Mori	Naoyuki Asano & Satoru Kiyomaru	March 8, 2024
33	10	"Haunted Mendo"; Transliteration: "Ayakashi Mendō" (Japanese: あやかしの面堂)	Naokatsu Tsuda	Hiroko Kanasugi	Naoyuki Asano & Satoru Kiyomaru	March 15, 2024
33	10	"Last Date"; Transliteration: "Saigo no Dēto" (Japanese: 最後のデート)	Naokatsu Tsuda	Hiroko Kanasugi	Naoyuki Asano & Satoru Kiyomaru	March 15, 2024
One evening, as Mendo's goons take count of his many octopus pets, they discover that one named Akumaru is missing; this octopus is known for his adventurous nature, and Mendo orders them to find him before he turns in for the night. Suddenly, in the middle of the night, a terrifying apparition attacks! A week later, Ataru, Lum, Ten and Shinobu arrive to see Mendo, wondering why he has been absent. Although he is initially reluctant, they finally get him to reveal the horrible truth: there is a ghost octopus living on Mendo's head. When Sakura asks Ataru to help the ghost of a girl named Nozomi find final peace, he discovers it will be a true trial, even with Lum agreeing to let him go on this date!
34	11	"The Case of the Battered Principal"; Transliteration: "Kōchō Ōda Jiken" (Japanese: 校長殴打事件)	Directed by : Fumihiro Ueno; Storyboarded by : Miwa Sasaki	Yuta Suzuki	Masashi Yamada	March 22, 2024
34	11	"The Secret Garden"; Transliteration: "Himitsu no Hanazono" (Japanese: 秘密の花園)	Directed by : Fumihiro Ueno; Storyboarded by : Miwa Sasaki	Yuta Suzuki	Masashi Yamada	March 22, 2024
34	11	"The Home Visit Blues: Hellish Moroboshi Edition"; Transliteration: "Namida no Katei Hōmon: Jigoku no Moroboshi Ka-hen" (Japanese: 涙の家庭訪問 地獄の諸星家編)	Directed by : Fumihiro Ueno; Storyboarded by : Miwa Sasaki	Yuta Suzuki	Masashi Yamada	March 22, 2024
When the Principal of Tomobiki High is knocked unconscious in his office, suspicion immediately falls on the school's most infamous troublemakers! When one of Ran's revenge plans goes wrong, trouble-making alien flowers are scattered over Tomobiki! This time Oden-Marks makes a visit to the Moroboshi home.
35	12	"Lovely Darling in Danger!!"; Transliteration: "Ai ♡ Dārin no Kiki!!" (Japanese: 愛♡ダーリンの危機！！)	Yumeko Iwaoka	Yūko Kakihara	Ryo Kobayashi	March 29, 2024
35	12	"Foxes in the Moonlight"; Transliteration: "Tsukiyo no Kitsune-tachi" (Japanese: 月夜のキツネたち)	Yumeko Iwaoka	Yūko Kakihara	Ryo Kobayashi	March 29, 2024
35	12	"The Home Visit Blues: Mark Onsen Goes to Space"; Transliteration: "Namida no Katei Hōmon: Onsen Māku Sora e" (Japanese: 涙の家庭訪問 温泉マーク宇宙(そら)へ)	Yumeko Iwaoka	Yūko Kakihara	Ryo Kobayashi	March 29, 2024
36	13	"Wretched Shutaro!!"; Transliteration: "Mijimekko・Shūtarō!!" (Japanese: みじめっ子・終太郎！！)	Directed by : Yukio Kuroda; Storyboarded by : Daisei Fukuoka & Takahiro Kamei	Hayashi Mori	Ryo Kobayashi	April 12, 2024
37a	14a	"Asuka Returns"; Transliteration: "Asuka Futatabi" (Japanese: 飛鳥ふたたび)	Directed by : Yuki Morita; Storyboarded by : Minoru Yamaoka	Hayashi Mori	Naoyuki Asano	April 19, 2024
Asuka can't stop her incestuous attraction towards Tobimaro and Mrs. Mizunokoji tells Asuka to go to the school to deliver a message. Asuka causes destruction and chasing around the place, Mrs. Mizunokoji makes Asuka and Shutarō to go on a date.
37b	14b	"A Stormy Date"; Transliteration: "Arashi o Yobu Dēto" (Japanese: 嵐を呼ぶデート)	Directed by : Yuki Morita; Storyboarded by : Minoru Yamaoka	Hayashi Mori	Masashi Yamada	April 19, 2024
38	15	"A Stormy Date"; Transliteration: "Arashi o Yobu Dēto" (Japanese: 嵐を呼ぶデート)	Directed by : Yasuhiro Kimura; Storyboarded by : Hideya Takahashi, Takahiro Kamei & Yasuhiro Kimura	Hayashi Mori	Satoru Kiyomaru & Ryo Kobayashi	April 26, 2024
Asuka and Shutarō's date looks to go well but Asuka's incredible strength gets in the way and Ataru can't stop his habits as he interfere with them. Mrs. Mizunokoji explains since it all started Asuka got bad impression of men due to first meeting with Ataru so she makes Asuka and Ataru to go on date by chaining them together and believes this will cure Asuka. But Ataru is no help due to his perverted habits and Asuka causes lot of destruction at Mendō Estate while Ataru takes all of Asuka's abuse, in the end of all of this Asuka's fear is still not cured and continues her incestuous behaviour towards Tobimaro much to Mrs. Mizunokoji anger.
39	16	"Nagisa's Fiance"; Transliteration: "Nagisa no Fianse" (Japanese: 渚のフィアンセ)	Directed by : Shinji Nagata; Storyboarded by : Miwa Sasaki	Hiroko Kanasugi	Satoru Kiyomaru	May 3, 2024
39	16	"The Fairy's Parasol"; Transliteration: "Yousei no Parasoru" (Japanese: 妖精のパラソル)	Directed by : Kiyomitsu Sato; Storyboarded by : Miwa Sasaki	Hiroko Kanasugi	Satoru Kiyomaru	May 3, 2024
Ryunosuke and her father buys a small island and they visited by the ghosts of previous owners; an old friend of Ryunosuke's father and his child Nagisa. Ryunosuke learns she was engaged to Nagisa before they died, Nagisa can pass on if they both kiss but Ryunosuke refuses to kiss Nagisa since due to being a woman herself. However, Nagisa turns out to have been raised in an opposite but similar way as Ryunosuke. Ten meets a fairy trapped in a pond and if Ten finds the parasol and gives to the fairy, the fairy will grant Ten's dream, the definition of "dream".
40	17	"One Night's Battle"; Transliteration: "Ichiya no Kōbōsen" (Japanese: 一夜の攻防戦)	Directed by : Yumeko Iwaoka; Storyboarded by : Kōji Iwai	Hiroko Kanasugi	Satoru Kiyomaru	May 10, 2024
40	17	"Deadly Peril in the Classroom"; Transliteration: "Inochi Kakemasu, Jugyō-chū!!" (Japanese: 命かけます、授業中！！)	Directed by : Hideya Takahashi; Storyboarded by : Kōji Iwai	Hiroko Kanasugi	Ryo Kobayashi	May 10, 2024
Nagisa has moved in with Ryunosuke after gaining physical body, drama and battle ensues between a boyish girl and a girlish boy. The class have to be quiet for one hour or they have to take supplementary lessons, but just because they are quiet does not mean the classroom is going to be normal.
41	18	"Flower Petals of Love and Courage"; Transliteration: "Ai to Yūki no Hana Ichirin" (Japanese: 愛と勇気の花一輪)	Directed by : Shugo Tsuneoka; Storyboarded by : Jun'ichi Sakata	Yūko Kakihara	Naoyuki Asano & Ryo Kobayashi	May 17, 2024
42	19	"Lum's Wrath"; Transliteration: "Ikari no Ramu-chan!!" (Japanese: 怒りのラムちゃん！！)	Directed by : Tetsuji Nakamura; Storyboarded by : Ichi Nishihara	Yūko Kakihara	Satoru Kiyomaru	May 24, 2024
42	19	"Steal My Heart"; Transliteration: "Hāto o Tsukame" (Japanese: ハートをつかめ)	Directed by : Tetsuji Nakamura; Storyboarded by : Ichi Nishihara	Yūko Kakihara	Satoru Kiyomaru	May 24, 2024
43	20	"The Morning of Farewell"; Transliteration: "Wakare no Asa" (Japanese: 別れの朝)	Directed by : Sumio Watanabe; Storyboarded by : Satomi Nakamura & Naotaka Hayashi	Yūko Kakihara	Naoyuki Asano & Masashi Yamada	May 31, 2024
Part one of the four-part finale "Boy Meets Girl". In Lum's childhood she is met by a short, dark skinned figure who asks if she is daughter of certain family and says he will come back for her to become a bride when she grows up. Lum's father tells Lum they have found her great grandfather after 20 years, her great grandfather is shocked to hear that Lum is a girl and they all are met by the same man. It is revealed that 120 years ago her great grandfather made a deal with him by giving him a daughter to become his bride, but it have been only boys in the family until Lum was finally born, it is decided that Lum shall marry his great grandson, but Lum and her parents refuses this. The great grandson named Rupa saw picture of Lum and fell in love with ever since childhood, Rupa arrives to the school to meet her and when she refuses he gives her a ring, the ring is going to make Lum grow up faster so her horns fell off to get new ones but she is temporary losing her powers until they grow out. After arguing with Ataru for being a hypocrite against her, she is met by Rupa as her horns fell off and Rupa then makes Lum fall asleep, Ataru sees Rupa kidnapping Lum.
44	21	"Are You Really Getting Married?"; Transliteration: "Kekkon Surutte Hontōdesuka" (Japanese: 結婚するって本当ですか)	Directed by : Yasuhiro Kimura; Storyboarded by : Tetsuji Takayanagi	Yūko Kakihara	Naoyuki Asano & Satoru Kiyomaru	June 7, 2024
Part two of the four-part finale "Boy Meets Girl". As Lum is kidnapped Ten have secretly with her, Lum's parents have received message of Lum's wedding, Lum's father and the Oni Tribe go to rescue her but they get a gift of mushrooms that covers everything and cuts off all communications off the planet. Oyuki tells Ataru, Shutarō and Benten about the Dark Dominion; a different star system one where they have no sun, it's a world of endless darkness. They go to Ran and Rei to use Ran's spaceship to go to the place to rescue Lum, to get there they use the moon's shadow to warp but they crash into a spaceship and they all arrive. The group gets captured except Ataru who meets the person of the ship, a woman named Karula who needs Ataru to get inside wedding ceremony to prevent Rupa getting married, she claims Rupa was in a relationship with her. The wedding is interrupted and Karula tells Rupa he had feelings for her, but Rupa says it was when they were kids and Karula forced him to like her. Karula is hurt and goes berserk, Ataru and Rupa runs away from Karula and Lum while the others goes to them.
45	22	"A Crooked Heart"; Transliteration: "Nejireta Hāto de" (Japanese: ねじれたハートで)	Directed by : Takahiro Kamei; Storyboarded by : Takahiro Kamei, Miwa Sasaki & Jun'ichi Sakata	Yūko Kakihara	Naoyuki Asano & Masashi Yamada	June 14, 2024
Part three of the four-part finale "Boy Meets Girl". The others arrive as Ataru, Rupa, Lum and Karula are on top of the tower, Rupa grabs Lum and Lum begs Ataru to save her but due to believing on her clone he rejects Lum and idiotically declares he is going to marry Karula. The four begins to fall off the roof, Rupa saves Karula and Ataru falls to save Lum, Lum slaps Ataru and calls out his selfishness and uncaring how distress Lum was in and never stops flirting with other girls, she points out about marrying Karula when he is not even serious about it, Ataru shows the fake marriage registration to Lum and Lum then gets her powers back when her horns grow out, finally being fed with him Lum decides to stay with Rupa. Benten says Ataru was tricked by her fake clone, Lum says this is why she is mad at him as this just proves that he doesn't trust her even the tiniest bit and the group goes home. The group is in Ataru's home and Karula shows up with mushrooms, Rupa reveal to Lum that Karula wasn't overbearing until he showed her the picture of Lum who he said was going to marry, Lum shows she herself is no different from Karula and asks how he has feeling for her when she is arranged bride who he never met, Rupa turns out to be no different from Ataru. The mushrooms grows gigantic due to being exposed to light or heat, the mushrooms begins to spread across the town and have to get help from Rupa and the pigs. Lum says if Ataru confess to her that loves her she will ask Rupa to help, Ataru in refusal and pride says that he hates her guts, Lum says Ataru has never once told her that he loves her, she begins to wonder if he serious about what he said to her. The earth is going to doomed by the mushrooms in 10 days, a hologram of Lum and Rupa to give Ataru a message that the pigs are capable of eating rid of the mushrooms and Lum tells Ataru if he wants them to save earth then Ataru have to compete with Lum in a game of tag by grabbing her horns within 10 days, or the only real chance of catching her is to say he loves her.
46	23	"I Want You When I Can't Have You"; Transliteration: "Naimononedari no Ai Uonto Yū" (Japanese: ないものねだりのI Want You)	Directed by : Yumeko Iwaoka & Hideya Takahashi; Storyboarded by : Yumeko Iwaoka, Manabu Ono & Hideya Takahashi	Yūko Kakihara	Naoyuki Asano, Masashi Yamada & Satoru Kiyomaru	June 21, 2024
Final part of the four-part finale "Boy Meets Girl". Lum and Ataru starts the game like the first time they met, Ataru tries to use his habits against Lum but it doesn't work. Lum tells Rupa that play tag is her last gamble to make Ataru say he loves her once, it turns out they plan to use the pigs regardless of how the game turns out, Rupa asks what happens if Ataru doesn't say it and Lum answers she can finally give up on him after knowing that's how he truly feels. Lum's parents are informed that Lum and Rupa's wedding has been cancelled by Rupa's decision and Lum gives them a message, Rupa finally confesses to Karula how he feels about her and they get engaged. The spaceship arrives with a memory scrubber device that if Ataru doesn't admit to loving her then Lum intends to wipe herself and her childhood friends from the memories of all earthlings, the activation switch is then pushed and the timer is set to go off on the final day and it is rigged to shut down if Ataru manages to grab hold of Lum's horns. The final day arrives, Ataru is asked of why he can't say few simple words and if he is okay of forgetting everything that's happened until now, Ataru feels even if he say he loves her how will Lum know if he's telling the truth or not, all Lum wants is Ataru to say it and she don't care if it's a lie. Ataru drops Lum's horns he kept all the time, Lum realizes this whole time Ataru was holding onto them, this proves he genuinely loves and cherishes her but never admitted it. Lum and Ataru hold each other and Lum puts his hands on her horns as he has won, the device is shut down and the pigs eat the mushrooms away. Lum and Ataru are back at their antics, ending the series.

== Home media release ==
In Japan, the series was released in two DVD and Blu-ray box sets in 2023. Volume 1, which contained the first cour, was released on March 15, 2023, while volume 2, which contained the second cour, was released on June 28, 2023.

In North America, Sentai Filmworks released the first season on Blu-ray as "Seasons 1 & 2" (representing the first two cours instead of the Japanese de facto first season) on March 19, 2024.
