= Kaf (singer) =

Japanese singer-songwriter and virtual YouTuber

- Born: December 2003 (age 22)
- Occupations: Singer-songwriter, virtual singer
- Member of: V.W.P -Virtual Witch Phenomenon-
- Website: kaf.kamitsubaki.jp
- Other names: Kaf Tarou, Kaf-chan

YouTube information
- Channel: 花譜 -KAF-
- Years active: 2018–present
- Genre: Singing
- Subscribers: 1.07 million
- Views: 421.9 million
- Last updated: May 17, 2026

Kaf -Unidentified Girl Observation Department-

YouTube information
- Channel: 花譜 -未確認少女観測部-
- Years active: 2022–present
- Subscribers: 56.7k
- Views: 1.55 million
- Last updated: May 17, 2026

Kaf (花譜; stylized as KAF; born December 2003) is a Japanese singer-songwriter and virtual YouTuber represented by Kamitsubaki Studio. She is active on YouTube where she uploads original songs as well as covers of J-Pop and Vocaloid songs.

Kaf's avatar was created by the character designer Palow, who continues to oversee updates to her costumes and new designs. For her first 3 albums she worked with Vocaloid Producer Iori Kanzaki as the primary composer. In 2021 she started a side project to her solo work entitled "Suite" in which she would work with artists across various genres. In 2022 she became the first VTuber to perform at the Nippon Budokan.

She is also a member of the virtual singer group V.W.P -Virtual Witch Phenomenon- alongside other members of the Kamitsubaki Studio label, Phenomenon Record. She provided the voice model for CeVIO AI Song's voicebank KAFU, released in July 2021.

== History ==
=== 2017–2018: discovery and early career ===
When KAF was 13 years old, around 2017, she would upload cover songs to a karaoke app which caught the attention of Japanese producer Piedpiper. Due to her location and age it took some time for him to connect with her, but their first recording session together surprised the managers and engineers who were present.

Kaf opened her YouTube channel on October 17, 2018, and uploaded her first video (a short clip of her humming the melody to her future release "Hinadori" (雛鳥, "Chicks")) on October 18. That December she uploaded her first original song "Ito" (糸, "Intertwined") which ranked 3rd in the J-Pop and 9th in the overall charts on ITunes. On December 31 she would make her live performance debut with her participation in the New Year's Eve VR singing contest event "Count0". Her performance of "Ito" as the final act of the event would contribute to a sizable increase in her following.

On February 1, 2019 Kaf announced a temporary hiatus to focus on her high school entrance exams. She ended the hiatus on March 20, 2019 and released the new song "Hinadori" (雛鳥, "Chicks").

=== 2019–2022: Fukakai era ===
On May 15, 2019 she released her first EP, Hana to Shinzō (花と心臓, "Flower & Heart"), followed shortly after with the opening of a Campfire crowdfunding campaign to raise money for her first one-man live. The campaign would raise more than 40 million yen from over 4000 backers, surpassing the 5 million yen goal The concert, titled Fukakai, was held on August 1 at LIQUIDROOM Ebisu and available to watch live at select movie theaters and karaoke shops.

Her song "Yoru ga Furiyamu Mae ni" (夜が降り止む前に, "Before The Night Falls") was selected as the theme for the movie Hot Gimmick: Girl Meets Boy, released on June 28, 2019. Kaf's first full-length album, Kansoku (観測, "Observation"), was released on September 11, 2019. The album was released in 2 formats, designated α and β with their own original artowork and bonus items in special packaging, a trend which would continue for her following albums. A remix album titled Kansoku γ (観測γ, "Observation ɣ") was released in December featuring contributions from other members of Kamitsubaki Studio and several guest remixers.

On March 14, 2020 Kaf released a YouTube video debuting a new outfit and hairstyle to represent a new period in her career. The follow up to her first one-man live, Fukakai (Re), was held on March 23, 2020 and adjusted to take place in an empty venue while livestreamed on 4 platforms including Niconico Live and YouTube Live for a fee as a result of Covid-19. In April her song "Answer" (アンサー) was used as the 11th ending theme to the TV anime series Black Clover. That same month she participated in the ZONe Energy IMMERSIVE SONG PROJECT with the song "ABnormal" (危ノーマル). Both songs would later be released on her 2nd EP and 2nd album.

On July 22, 2020 her 2nd EP, titled Hana to Kaitou (花と解答, "Flower & Answer"), was released. The title for this EP was decided in consultation with her producer, Iori Kanzaki, with the hope that the listener would be able to feel the "answer" in the various meanings of the songs. Kaf stated that during the recording of Flower & Answer she could feel her personal growth as a result of starting voice training, noting that she felt her voice had changed and that she better grasps how to control its tone and resonance. On September 23, 2020 she would release a collaboration song with Kizuna AI titled "Karisome" (かりそめ, "Transient") as part of a joint single titled Ai to Hana (愛と花, "Love & Flower"). Her second full-length album, Mahō (魔法, "Magic"), was released on November 25, 2020 with a remix album to follow in December 2021.

Kaf's 3rd one-man live show, titled Fukakai 2 Q2, was held on March 13, 2021 at the virtual venue PANDORA. This concert was broadcast for free on YouTube Live, and during the show the group V.W.P -Virtual Witch Phenomenon- was announced with Kaf as a member. In May 2021 she provided an insert song for the anime film Pompo: The Cinéphile, titled "Tatoeba" (例えば, "For Example").

After a delay due to survey feedback in late 2020, the CeVIO AI voicebank KAFU was released using Kaf as the voice model was released on July 7, 2021. On October 18, 2021 Kaf celebrated her third anniversary. To commemorate the event she announced and started the Kumikyoku (組曲, "Suite") project on October 27 of the same year. The project was stated to culminate with 15 songs created in collaboration with major label artists from the Japanese music industry, released over an extended period of time.

On March 26, 2022 a special one-man live was held to commemorate her high school graduation. On the same day she announced she would begin hosting her own radio program, titled Panpa ka KAFi R (ぱんぱかカフぃR), which broadcasts on InterFM. On August 24, 2022 Kaf held her 3rd one-man live concert, Fukakai 3 (Mad), at the Nippon Budokan marking the first time a VTuber had performed at the venue. In September 2022 she opened her membership driven YouTube channel, focused on monthly livestreams where she interacts with her fans in real time. In October 2022 the Maisondes collaboration song "Tokyo Shandy Rendezvous" (トウキョウ・シャンディ・ランデヴ) was released as the ending theme to the 2022 TV anime series Urusei Yatsura, and would amass more than 100 million plays across streaming services. Kaf was also selected as one of Forbes Japan 30 Under 30 in 2022.

=== 2023–present: departure of Iori Kanzaki and expanded activities ===
On March 8, 2023 Kaf's 3rd full-length album, Kyoso (狂想, "Crazy For You"), was released. This album would be the final time Iori Kanzaki would act as Kaf's primary composer. In August she would participate in YouTube Music Weekend alongside other Japanese artists, with promotions featuring her prominently appearing in New York City's Times Square. On November 1, 2023 an official English language Kaf information X account was launched alongside her first English language interview.

January 3, 2024 marked the end of the Kumikyoku series with its 15th release, Ai no Mama (愛のまま, "Still in Love") with Shigeru Kishida. On January 14, 2024 Kaf held her 4th one-man live "Kaika" as part of the 2-day "Kamitsubaki Yoyogi Wars" event at Yoyogi National Gymnasium. During the event she announced a new singer-songwriter project under the name Kaika and performed the first songs from this project. Her 4th album, being called Guuwa (寓話, "Fable"), was also announced alongside a second series of Kumikyoku songs, and the upcoming release of her 3rd remix album, Kyoso γ (狂想γ, "Crazy For You ɣ").

On February 28, 2024 Kaf kicked off Kumikyoku 2 (組曲 2, "Suite Round 2") with the new single and music video Gimme Gimme Tōhikō feat. #KTchan (Prod. peko) (ギミギミ逃避行 feat.#KTちゃん(Prod. peko), "Gimi Gimi Flight feat. #KT-chan (Prod. peko)"). On April 24, 2024 the first single from the Kaika project, titled Kaika (かいか), along with a music video that features footage of her performance at Yoyogi National Gymnasium earlier in the year. In May Kaf began a series of weekly English Q&A videos on X called "Kaf's Worldwide Observations" as a means to communicate with her international fans. Also in May, she released her first new song since the departure of Kanzaki Iori, "Gestalt" (ゲシュタルト) produced by Jazzin' Park.

On June 21, 2024 Kaf's YouTube reached 1 million subscribers, which she celebrated by holding a livestream event to catch the occurrence live while interacting with fans. On August 8, 2024 the first trailer for a new anime series called Kamitsubaki City Under Construction was released, which will feature Kaf's debut as a voice actor playing a character based on herself. The series is scheduled to release in 2025.

On October 12, 2024 Kaf announced her 4th album Guuwa to be released on December 25, 2024. Simultaneously, she announced her first English-language release "Answer (English Ver.)" self-covering her 2020 release of the same title, releasing on October 23, 2024. On November 3, 2024, Kaf performed a revamped version of her 4th one-man live under the title "Re: Kaika" at Makuhari Messe in Chiba, Japan. During the event, Kaf announced two new releases in the Kumikyoku 2 series, collaborating with Hoshimachi Suisei and Moe Shop.

== Discography ==
=== Albums ===
List of albums, with selected chart positions
Title	Album details	Catalog no.	Peak positions
Title	Album details	Catalog no.	JPN
Kansoku α (観測α, "Observation ɑ") Kansoku β (観測β, "Observation ꞵ")	Released: September 11, 2019; Label: Kamitsubaki Record; Formats: CD, digital download	KTR-004（α） KTR-005（β）	15
Kansoku γ (観測γ, "Observation ɣ")	Released: December 25, 2019; Label: Kamitsubaki Record; Formats: CD, digital download	KTR-008	46
I Scream Live	Released: August 19, 2020; Label: Phenomenon Record; Formats: CD, digital download	KTR-016	—
Mahō α (魔法α, "Magic ɑ") Mahō β (魔法β, "Magic ꞵ")	Released: November 11, 2020; Label: Kamitsubaki Record; Formats: CD, digital download	KTR-019（α） KTR-020（β）	9
Mahō γ (魔法γ, "Magic ɣ")	Released: December 22, 2021; Label: Kamitsubaki Record; Formats: CD, LP, digital download	KTR-039	—
Kyoso α (狂想α, "Crazy For You ɑ") Kyoso β (狂想β, "Crazy For You ꞵ")	Released: March 8, 2023; Label: Kamitsubaki Record; Formats: CD, digital download	KTR-077（α） KTR-078（β）	10
I Scream Live 2	Released: September 27, 2023; Label: Phenomenon Record; Formats: CD, digital download	KTR-01115	—
Kumikyoku (組曲, "Suite")	Released: March 22, 2024; Label: Phenomenon Record; Formats: CD+Blu-Ray	KTR-0141	—
Kyoso γ (狂想γ, "Crazy For You ɣ")	Released: March 27, 2024; Label: Phenomenon Record; Formats: CD, digital download	KTR-0140	—

=== EPs ===
Title	EP Details	Catalog no.
Hana to Shinzō (花と心臓, "Flower & Heart")	Released: May 15, 2019; Label: Kamitsubaki Record; Formats: CD, digital download	KTR-002
Hana to Kaitou (花と解答, "Flower & Answer")	Released: July 22, 2020; Label: Kamitsubaki Record; Formats: CD, digital download	KTR-014 (Original ver.); XNKT-00015 (Black Clover ve.)
GSA	Released: May 22, 2024; Label: Phenomenon Record; Formats: digital download	—

=== Singles ===
Title	Single details	Catalog no.	Peak positions
Title	Single details	Catalog no.	JPN
"Ito" (糸, "Intertwined")	Released: December 6, 2018; Label: Kamitsubaki Record; Formats: digital download	—	28
"Majo" (魔女, "The Witch")	Released: December 21, 2018; Label: Kamitsubaki Record; Formats: CD, digital download	—	32
"Shinzō to Karakuri" (心臓と絡繰, "Heart & Trick")	Released: December 28, 2018; Label: Kamitsubaki Record; Formats: digital download	—	33
"Yoru ga Furiyamu Mae ni" (夜が降り止む前に, "Before The Night Falls")	Released: June 28, 2019; Label: Kamitsubaki Record; Formats: CD, digital download	KTR-003	—
"Tomadoi Telepathy" (戸惑テレパシー, "Confused Telepathy")	Released: June 10, 2020; Label: Kamitsubaki Record; Formats: CD, digital download	KTR-012	—
"Ai to Hana" (愛と花, "Love & Flower")	Released: September 23, 2020; Label: Kamitsubaki Record; Formats: CD, digital download	KTR-017 (Kizuna AI ver.); KTR-018 (KAF ver.)	50
"Tatoeba" (例えば, "For Example")	Released: May 19, 2021; Label: Kamitsubaki Record; Formats: digital download	—	—
"Umi ni Bakeru" (海に化ける, "Turn Into The Sea")	Released: June 30, 2021; Label: Kamitsubaki Record; Formats: digital download	—	—

=== Suite ===
Title	Single details	Collaborator	Lyrics, Composition, Arrangement
Kagami yo Kagami (鏡よ鏡, "Mirror, Mirror On The Wall")	Released: October 27, 2021; Label: Kamitsubaki Record; Formats: digital download	Glim Spanky	Remi Matsuo (lyrics); Glim Spanky (composition); Hiroki Kamemoto (arrangement)
Imaginary Friend (イマジナリーフレンド)	Released: November 17, 2021; Label: Kamitsubaki Record; Formats: digital download	Seiko Oomori	Seiko Oomori (lyrics,composition); Kaoru Okubo (大久保薫) (arrangement)
Asahi (あさひ, "Sunrise")	Released: December 8, 2021; Label: Kamitsubaki Record; Formats: digital download	Ayane Sakura	Iori Kanzaki (カンザキイオリ)
Hishōsuru Meme (飛翔するMeme, "Fly Meme")	Released: January 19, 2022; Label: Kamitsubaki Record; Formats: digital download	Tanaka	Tanaka (lyrics, composition); Kenkaiyoshi (ケンカイヨシ) (composition, arrangement)
Watashi no Senkō (わたしの線香, "My Incense")	Released: February 22, 2022; Label: Kamitsubaki Record; Formats: digital download	Maigo Hanyuu (羽生まゐご)	Maigo Hanyuu (羽生まゐご)
Shun'yō (春陽, "Springtime")	Released: March 23, 2022; Label: Kamitsubaki Record; Formats: digital download	Whale Don't Sleep (くじら)	Whale Don't Sleep (くじら)
Tsubomi ni Kaminari (蕾に雷, "Thunder in Bud")	Released: April 20, 2022; Label: Kamitsubaki Record; Formats: digital download	Hakushi Hasegawa (長谷川白紙)	Hakushi Hasegawa (長谷川白紙)
Beyond Meta	Released: May 11, 2022; Label: Kamitsubaki Record; Formats: digital download	Miyavi	Miyavi (lyrics, composition, arrangement); Emyli (lyrics); Lenard Solnik (composition, arrangement); Kelsey Klingensmith (composition)
Ryūsenkei Mayday (流線形メーデー, "Streamline Shape Mayday")	Released: July 13, 2022; Label: Kamitsubaki Record; Formats: digital download	Kafu	Saijitsu Haneda (祭日ハネダ) (lyrics); HiFi-P (composition, arrangement)
Can-Verse	Released: October 12, 2022; Label: Kamitsubaki Record; Formats: digital download	Oresama	Pon (ぽん) (lyrics); Hideya Kojima (小島英也) (composition, arrangement)
Made in Atashi (メイドインあたし, "Made In Me")	Released: March 8, 2023; Label: Kamitsubaki Record; Formats: digital download	Tokyo Gegegay (東京ゲゲゲイ)	Mikey (lyrics, composition, arrangement); Marie Mizuki (水木マリエ) (lyrics); Hideki Ataka (安宅秀紀) (arrangement)
Himitsu no Kotoba (秘密の言葉, "Secret Word")	Released: April 5, 2023; Label: Kamitsubaki Record; Formats: digital download	Zookaraderu (ズーカラデル)	Takanobu Yoshida (吉田崇展) (lyrics); Zookaraderu (ズーカラデル) (composition, arrangement)
Alpha YOU (prompt αU ver.) (あるふぁYOU (prompt αU ver.))	Released: April 19, 2023; Label: Kamitsubaki Record; Formats: digital download	EMA	カンザキイオリ (Iori Kanzaki) (lyrics, composition, arrangement) 雄之助 (Yunosuke) (composition, arrangement)
Shuge-High (しゅげーハイ, "Handicraft-High")	Released: July 5, 2023; Label: Kamitsubaki Record; Formats: digital download	Kenmochi Hidefumi (ケンモチヒデフミ)	Kenmochi Hidefumi (ケンモチヒデフミ)
Watashi no Koe (わたしの声, "My Voice")	Released: September 6, 2023; Label: Phenomenon Record; Formats: digital download	Mondo Grosso	Shinichi Osawa
Ai no Mama (愛のまま, "Still in Love")	Released: January 3, 2024; Label: Phenomenon Record; Formats: digital download	Shigeru Kishida (岸田繁)	Kaf (lyrics); Shigeru Kishida (岸田繁) (composition, arrangement)

=== Suite Round 2 ===
Title	Single details	Collaborator	Lyrics, Composition, Arrangement
Gimi Gimi Tōhikō feat. #KT-chan (Prod. peko) (ギミギミ逃避行 feat.#KTちゃん(Prod. peko), "Gimi Gimi Flight feat. #KT-chan (Prod. peko)")	Released: February 28, 2024; Label: Phenomenon Record; Formats: digital download	'#KTchan' (#KTちゃん)	Kaf (lyrics, composition) '#KT-chan' (#KTちゃん) (lyrics, composition); Peko (composition, arrangement)
Dakishimete (抱きしめて, "Hug Me")	Released: June 12, 2024; Label: Phenomenon Record; Formats: digital download	崎山蒼志 (Soshi Sakiyama)	崎山蒼志 (Soshi Sakiyama) (lyrics, composition); Naoki Itai (arrangement)
Chewing Disco (チューイン・ディスコ)	Released: August 21, 2024; Label: Phenomenon Record; Formats: digital download	Tsumiki (ツミキ)	Tsumiki (ツミキ)

=== Other ===
Title	Details	Artist	Lyrics, Composition, Arrangement
Battō feat. Kaf (抜刀 feat. 花譜)	Released: December 13, 2021; digital single	Maigo Hanyuu (羽生まゐご)	Maigo Hanyuu (羽生まゐご)
Tokyo Shandy Rendezvous feat. Kaf, Tsumiki (トウキョウ・シャンディ・ランデヴ feat. 花譜, ツミキ)	Released: October 21, 2022; Urusei Yatsura (2022) ending theme	Maisondes	Tsumiki (ツミキ)
Tsubame ~NumaHama Version (ツバメ～沼ハマバージョン, "Swallow ~NumaHama Version")	Released: December 2, 2022; Yoasobi cover for NHK "Minna no Uta"	Kaf	Ayase (lyrics, composition); Hare Ichiban (晴いちばん) (arrangement)
Manneri Weekend feat. Kaf (マンネリウィークエンド feat.花譜, "Mannerism Weekend feat. Kaf")	Released: November 22, 2023; Appears on Fake Swing 2 album	Fake Type.	Tophamhat-Kyo (lyrics); Dyes Iwasaki (composition, arrangement)
Kamisama Kidori (カミサマキドリ)	Released: January 18, 2024; Kaf appears as a chorus member	Novel Core feat. Takuya Yamanaka (from The Oral Cigarettes)	Takuya Yamanaka (lyrics); Novel Core (lyrics, composition, arrangement)
&Shiso (Reverse) ft. Kaf (＆疾走(Reverse) ft.花譜, "&Sprint (Reverse) ft. Kaf")	Released: January 31, 2024; Appears on &Shiso Deluxe ver. (＆疾走 Deluxe ver., &Sprint Deluxe ver.)	Dios	Dios
Beki feat. Kaf (Prod. by peko)	Released: February 28, 2024	'#KT-chan' (#KTちゃん)	Kaf (lyrics, composition) '#KT-chan' (#KTちゃん) (lyrics, composition); Peko (composition, arrangement)
Himitsu o Kimi ni feat. Kaf (ひみつを君に feat. 花譜)	Released: September 11, 2024	Glim Spanky	Remi Matsuo (lyrics); Glim Spanky (composition); Hiroki Kamemoto (arrangement)

== Appearances ==
=== Live events ===
Date	Event name	Location	Venue
December 31, 2018	New Year's Eve VR singing contest event "Count0"	Live Streaming	VR Sparc, Aeon Cinema
April 28, 2019	VTuber Fes Japan 2019	Chiba, Japan	Niconico Chokaigi 2019; Makuhari Messe
August 1, 2019	Kaf 1st One-Man Live "Fukakai"	Tokyo, Japan	Liquidroom Ebisu
September 29, 2019	Favric	Live Streaming	Makuhari Messe
March 23, 2020	Kaf 1st One-Man Live "Fukakai (Re)"	Live Streaming	Zepp DiverCity (Tokyo)
June 14, 2020	Kaf Live Streaming Cover Live "I Scream Live"	Live Streaming	YouTube
October 10, 2020	Kaf 2nd One-Man Live "Fukakai 2 Q1"	Live Streaming	YouTube
January 31, 2021	VTuber Fes Japan 2021 Day 2	Saitama, Japan	Kawaguchi Cultural Center Lilia
March 13, 2021	Kaf 2nd One-Man Live "Fukakai 2 Q2"	Live Streaming	YouTube
April 4, 2021	V-Carnival	Live Streaming	Custom Streaming Site
June 11–12, 2021	Kaf 2nd One-Man Live "Fukakai 2 Rebuilding"	Tokyo, Japan	Toyosu Pit
July 23, 2021	Iori Kanzaki's 1st Performance "Clumsy Man"	Live Streaming	YouTube
March 26, 2022	Kaf High School Graduation Special Live	Live Streaming	Z-aN
April 15–16, 2022	VWP 1st One-Man Live "Gensho"	Tokyo, Japan	Toyosu Pit
April 30, 2022	Vtuber Fes Japan 2022 Day 2	Chiba, Japan	Niconico Chokaigi 2022; Makuhari Messe
May 15, 2022	Valis 2nd Anniversary Mini Live "Kanjou Prestige Vol. 2"	Live Streaming	Z-aN, YouTube
July 1, 2022	VTuber Fes. BPM [Blinks Per Minute] Powered by Rohto Pharmaceutical	Live Streaming	YouTube
July 2–3, 2022	xR Artists Super Fes 2022	Live Streaming	dTV, Pia Live Stream
August 24, 2022	Kaf 3rd One-Man Live "Fukakai 3 (Mad)"	Tokyo, Japan	Nippon Budokan
January 28, 2023	Kaf Live Streaming Cover Live "I Scream Live 2"	Live Streaming	YouTube
March 4, 2023	Kaf 3rd One-Man Live "Fukakai 3 (Sou)"	Live Streaming	Z-aN
March 30–31, 2023	Kamitsubaki Fes '23	Tokyo, Japan	Toyosu Pit
October 14, 2023	J-Wave Innovation World Festa 2023	Tokyo, Japan	Roppongi Hills Arena
January 7, 2024	Aniplex 20th Anniversary Event -Thanx-	Tokyo, Japan	Tokyo Garden Theater
January 13–14, 2024	Kamitsubaki Yoyogi Wars 2024	Tokyo, Japan	Yoyogi National Gymnasium
August 8, 2024	Kamitsubaki Fes '24 The Day The Earth Stood Still	Yokohama, Japan	Pacifico Yokohama
June 7, 2025	AFAID25 Anime Festival Asia Indonesia	Jakarta, Indonesia	Jakarta Convention Center
July 3, 2025	Fantastic Reality presented by IRIAM	Los Angeles, United States	Vermont Hollywood

=== Television ===
Date	Program name	Network
December 1, 2019	Notokuban ~Ai wa Sekai o Tsunagu~ 2019 (のとく番〜アイは世界を繋ぐ〜 2019, Notokuban ~I Connect The World~ 2019)	BS Nippon TV
October 15, 2020	Ars-kun to Techne-chan (アルスくんとテクネちゃん, Ars-kun and Techne-chan)	TV Asahi
August 18, 2021	Break Out	TV Asahi
November 15, 2021	Numa ni Hamatte Kite Mita "Nummer Sonic 2021 ~Tōtoki Seishun Revenge" (沼にハマってきいてみた「ヌマーソニック2021 ～尊き青春リベンジ～」, Wading into The Swamp "Nummer Sonic 2021 ~Revenge of Our Precious Youth")	NHK
September 29, 2022	Project V (プロジェクトV)	Nippon Television
October 12 – November 30, 2022	Muv-Luv Alternative (Season 2 Episodes 14, 18–21) (マブラヴ オルタネイティヴ)	Fuji Television
October 23, 2022	Hasshin! Mirai Creator (発進!ミライクリエイター, Launch! Mirai Creator)	Fuji Television
November 2, 2022	Minna no Uta (みんなのうた, Songs for Everyone)	NHK
November 6, 2022	Uta no Shin Top Ten (歌のシン・トップテン, New Top Ten Songs)	Nippon Television
December 4, 2022	Hasshin! Mirai Creator (発進!ミライクリエイター, Launch! Mirai Creator)	Fuji Television
February 2, 2023	Project V (プロジェクトV)	Nippon Television
December 28, 2023	Music Verse	Nippon Television
January 22, 2024	Music-ru TV (musicるTV)	TV Asahi

== Awards ==
- Forbes Japan 30 Under 30 2022 – Entertainment Category
