= Kamitsubaki City Under Construction =

Japanese media franchise

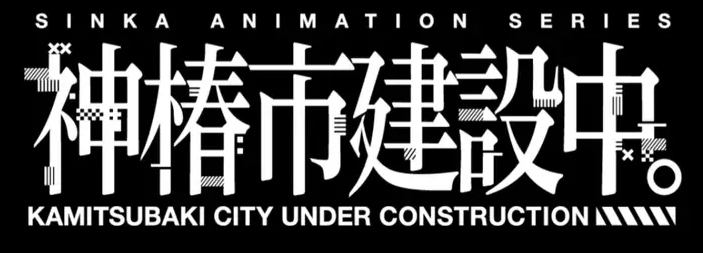
- Kamitsubaki City Under Construction logo

神椿市建設中。 (Kamitsubaki-shi Kensetsu-chū.)
- Created by: Kamitsubaki Studio; PIEDPIPER
- Video game

Kamitsubaki City Ensemble
- Developer: Studio Lalala; Rocket Studio
- Publisher: Kamitsubaki Studio
- Genre: Rhythm game
- Platform: iOS, Android, Microsoft Windows (Steam), Nintendo Switch, PlayStation 5
- Released: August 29, 2024
- Video game

Kamitsubaki City Regenerate
- Developer: Kamitsubaki Studio; Orange
- Publisher: Kamitsubaki Studio
- Genre: Visual novel
- Platform: Microsoft Windows (Steam), Nintendo Switch
- Released: March 13, 2025
- Anime television series
- Directed by: Kōdai Kakimoto
- Written by: Kōdai Kakimoto
- Music by: Kento Asahina
- Studio: SMDE
- Licensed by: Crunchyroll
- Original network: JNN (TBS)
- Original run: July 3, 2025 – September 25, 2025
- Episodes: 13

Kamitsubaki City Under Construction (神椿市建設中。, Kamitsubaki-shi Kensetsu-chū.) is a Japanese mixed-media project created by Kamitsubaki Studio. It began in 2019 and consists of songs, videos, as well as a tabletop game and a video game. A rhythm game titled Kamitsubaki City Ensemble (神椿市協奏中。, Kamitsubaki-shi Kyōsō-chū.) was released on August 29, 2024, and an anime television series produced by SMDE aired from July to September 2025.

== Plot ==
Kamitsubaki City describes an urban, high-tech metropolitan City with its citizens living peacefully. Behind this city lurks an unknown danger, and the only ones who can save it from danger are a group of witches who can sing.

== Characters ==
Kafu Morisaki (森先 化歩, Morisaki Kafu)
Voiced by: Kaf
Rime Tanioki (谷置 狸眼, Tanioki Rime)
Voiced by: Rim
Haru Asanushi (朝主 派流, Asanushi Haru)
Voiced by: Harusaruhi
Sekai Yorukawa (夜河 世界, Yorukawa Sekai)
Voiced by: Isekaijoucho
Koko Rinne (輪廻 此処, Rinne Koko)
Voiced by: Koko
Laplace (らぷらす, Rapurasu)
Voiced by: Ayane Sakura
Hastur (はすたー, Hasutā)
Voiced by: Miyu Tomita
Agni (あぐに)
Voiced by: Yōhei Azakami
Anemos (あねもす)
Voiced by: Shūichirō Umeda
Kugel (くーげる)
Voiced by: Mai Tōdō
Reconstruction Manager (復興課長, Fukkō Kachō)
Voiced by: Shizuka Itō

== Other media ==
=== Video games ===
A rhythm game titled Kamitsubaki City Ensemble (神椿市協奏中。, Kamitsubaki-shi Kyōsō-chū.) was released on August 29, 2024, for iOS, Android, Windows, Nintendo Switch, and PlayStation 5.

A visual novel titled Kamitsubaki City Regenerate (神椿市建設中。REGENERATE, Kamitsubaki-shi Kensetsu-chū.) was released on March 13, 2025, for Windows and the Nintendo Switch, which includes a virtual reality version.

=== Anime ===
An anime television series was announced on January 13, 2024. It is produced by SMDE and directed and written by Kōdai Kakimoto, with Sōki Tsukishima serving as supervisor and PALOW designing the characters. The series aired from July 3 to September 25, 2025, on TBS and its affiliates. The opening theme song is "Utahime" (歌姫; Songstress), performed by V.W.P. Crunchyroll streamed the series outside of Asia.

==== Episodes ====
No.	Title	Directed by (Note: Production staff information is taken from the ending credits of each episode.)	Written by	Storyboarded by	Original release date
0	"Witchling: Part 1"; Transliteration: "Majo no Musume -Witchling- Zenhen" (Japanese: 魔女の娘 -Witchling- 前篇)	Yūya Ishihara	Kōdai Kakimoto	Kōdai Kakimoto	July 3, 2025
The city of Kamitsubaki is hit by a disaster dubbed the "Blackout", where the sun turns green and instantly incinerates any human caught in its light. A young girl named Kafu appears to be immune to the effects of the Blackout, but she is traumatized when she comes across the burnt bodies of her parents. Orphaned, she is later adopted by her neighbor Erika. Seven years later, Kafu is now a high school student who sings as a hobby, but the city is now experiencing odd supernatural phenomena dubbed "Q". Her singing attracts the attention of a mysterious young boy named Laplace, until she receives word that Erika has caught up in a Q event. She heads over, but only arrives in time to see Erika killed by a monster called a "tesseractor". Laplace rescues Kafu and reveals she is a "witchling", a person whose songs have the power to destroy tesseractors, who are humans twisted by their own negative emotions. Kafu is also told that tesseractors and the "Incomprehensible Regions" they create are a side effect of Kamitsubaki's reliance on Fragments for energy, which is derived from human thought.
1	"Witchling: Part 2"; Transliteration: "Majo no Musume -Witchling- Gohen" (Japanese: 魔女の娘 -Witchling- 後篇)	Unknown	Kōdai Kakimoto	Kōdai Kakimoto	July 11, 2025 (Note: This episode aired at 12:26 a.m. JST, 30 minutes after the original air time on TBS.)
Kafu and her fellow Witchlings along with their familiars managed to suppress an outbreak of tesseractors. However, the number of Q incidents keeps increasing, with the risk of another Blackout occurring. That night, Sekai witnesses a premonition of a mass tesseractor attack on the city, and her prediction proves true when a massive Incomprehensible Area forms in Area 3. The Witchlings arrive in Area 3 and begin to engage the tesseractors until the Reconstruction Division discovers that the tesseractors' true target is the VALIS defensive shield that protects the city from Blackouts. With the other Witchlings busy either holding off the tessseractors or assisting in civilian evacuation, Kafu volunteers to protect VALIS. However, despite their best efforts, Kafu and Laplace fail to protect the VALIS device and it is destroyed, opening a breach in the city's protective shield.
2	"Song of Purification"; Transliteration: "Jōka no Uta -Song of purification-" (Japanese: 浄化の歌 -Song of purification-)	Unknown	Midori Gotō	Yūya Ishihara	July 18, 2025
Koko is ordered to escort the replacement VALIS device to Area 3, while Sekai receives a premonition that the Church of Isekai Salvation will be attacked by tesseractors, leaving the remaining three witchlings to hold off the tesseractor assault. Sekai and her familiar Anemos reach the church, and she is glad everybody is still fine, protected by the song the of resident witch, Makana. As Sekai purifies the tesseractors attacking the church, she recalls how she was raised by the church as a child but became disillusioned when she found out they only valued her for her witch powers. The Reconstruction Division then transports Sekai and Makana to the frontlines just as Koko arrives with the replacement VALIS device. The Reconstruction Division then instructs Makana to enter the device as it can only be powered by a "potential witch" like her. The witchlings protest the idea of sacrificing Makana, but she willingly enters the pod in order to protect everybody. The protective shield is restored, ending the tesseractor attack, but everybody is saddened at the loss of Makana.
3	"Fragment -Energy of will-" Transliteration: "Furagumento -Energy of will-" (Japanese: フラグメント -Energy of will-)	Unknown	Midori Gotō	Hiroki Itai	July 24, 2025
The witchlings are dejected at Makana's death, with the Reconstruction Division explaining that the sacrifice of potential witches is necessary in order ensure the city's safety. Rime heads off to eliminate another tesseractor, and while doing so recalls how her parents invented Fragments technology, though her mother was killed by a tesseractor while her father turned into a tesseractor himself, forcing Rime to purify him. Kafu confronts the RD Chief about keeping secrets from her and the witchlings, and wishes that she could try and understand humans more rather than writing off their lives as necessary sacrifices. Kafu and Rime then return home and are shocked to see the RD Chief having taken a human form that looks similar to Kafu, so she can learn more about humans as Kafu suggested. After spending time with Kafu, the RD Chief eventually does come to understand human emotions and reconciles with the witchlings over Makana's sacrifice. However, the RD Chief is suddenly killed by Kugel, causing Kafu to suffer a nervous breakdown as she's reminded of Erika's death.
4	"Malice"; Transliteration: "Akui -Malice-" (Japanese: 悪意 -Malice-)	Unknown	Hitomi Ogawa	Yoshikazu Miyao	July 31, 2025
With the RD Chief dead, there is nobody to operate the city's anti-tesseractor defenses and the city's ability to defend against tesseractor attacks is greatly diminished. As a result, more and more people begin to disappear, and without the RD Chief to control information, rumors begin to spread of "Witches" being the ones responsible for the disappearances. Koko stays behind at the command center to monitor for Incomprehensible Regions, while the rest of the witchlings are left reeling at Kugel's apparent betrayal. Kugel himself had managed to escape and remains missing. Rime then heads back to her father's lab to find more answers about the tesseractors, while Koko recalls how she woke up with amnesia, but befriended Kugel. She then spots Kugel's signal at the train station and heads over to investigate, only to find a tesseractor attacking the crowd. The witchlings converge on the location and manage to purify the tesseractor, but the crowd reacts with fear of the witchlings, who they believe are Witches. Meanwhile, Kugel watches everything from atop the city's central tower.
5	"Familiar"; Transliteration: "Famiria -Familiar-" (Japanese: ファミリア -Familiar-)	Unknown	Hitomi Ogawa	Yoshikazu Miyao	August 7, 2025
The public begins panicking at the sight of the witchlings, forcing them to go into hiding while Koko seems to start recovering her lost memories. However, the situation continues to degrade as more humans succumb to panic and turn into tesseractors, spreading more panic as they attack and kill people across the entire city. Koko, Haru, and Sekai attempt to return to base, but they are intercepted by an angry mob who believes they can stop the tesseractors by killing the witches. Agni and Anemos attempt to protect the trio, but are restricted to only fighting in their human forms. Meanwhile, Kugel attacks another tesseractor named Maxwell, but fails. Koko then finds Kugel and reveals she now remembers everything, how she came from the future where her fellow witchlings were killed, and that Kugel had taken it upon himself to kill the RD Chief and spread chaos across the city to draw out Maxwell and kill him. Kugel apologizes for not telling Koko the truth and betraying her, and subsequently kills himself. Saddened by Kugel's death, Koko takes his core and sings, which ends up pacifying the entire city and ending the crisis.
6	"Memory Egg -Piece of Memory-"; Transliteration: "Kioku no Tamago -Piece of memory-" (Japanese: 記憶の卵 -Piece of memory-)	Tairiki Kiritani	Midori Gotō	Yūya Ishihara	August 14, 2025
Koko recovers Kugel's "Memory Egg", and informs the other witchlings that she has recovered her memories and shows them the memories stored in the Memory Egg. They had all in fact been attempting and failing to protect the city against Maxwell hundreds of times, with the city having a failsafe system called "Phenomenon" that resets the timeline when all humans in the city are dead. However, a drawback to Phenomenon is that anybody revived by it doesn't carry over their memories from previous loops. The RD Chief in the previous loop got around this by temporarily transporting Koko to an alternate dimension, preventing her being reset by Phenomenon and keeping her memories. All of the witchlings are at first shocked at witnessing their own numerous deaths, but each of them resolves to keep fighting in their own way except for Kafu. She confides to Laplace that witnessing Koko's song dispel everybody's fear and rage scared her since it demonstrated their songs can overwrite human emotions, and she's afraid her songs will end up hurting people. Because of her fear, she admits that she can no longer sing.
7	"Phenomenon"; Transliteration: "Genshō -Phenomenon-" (Japanese: 現象 -Phenomenon-)	Asuka Igarashi	Hitomi Ogawa	Hiroki Itai	August 22, 2025 (Note: This episode aired at 12:01 a.m. JST, 5 minutes after the original air time on TBS.)
Maxwell continues to try and find a way to stop Phenomenon so he can permanently destroy Kamitsubaki. Back at the city, Laplace warns the witchlings that Maxwell intends to bring about a second Blackout in five days. Rime then asks the Familiars why they haven't told them about the time loops if they retain their memories, and Laplace admits they were afraid of causing the witchlings to fall into despair. Laplace suggests that the only way to defeat Maxwell is for all five witchlings to tap into the same power Koko did and use their songs to rewrite the rules of reality. Kafu remains reluctant about the plan, and when she catches sight of a Tesseractor, tries to purify it but cannot bring herself to sing, requiring Koko and Rime to save her. Rime, Koko, and Haru then meet and begin to wonder what exactly witchlings are. Sekai privately meets with Kafu and talks about her fear of singing, only for Maxwell to arrive and point out that Kafu is not afraid of singing, but the world itself. He reveals that Kamitsubaki is actually a simulated world created by Sophie the Witch, and is caught in an eternal cycle of destruction and rebirth due to the conflict between the two of them. He additionally reveals that Laplace has actually been his servant all along. This causes Kafu to fall into despair and turn into a Tesseractor.
8	"Blackout -Beginning of the end-" Transliteration: "Burakkuauto -Beginning of the end-" (Japanese: ブラックアウト -Beginning of the end-)	Yūya Ishihara	Midori Gotō	Hiroki Itai	August 29, 2025
Maxwell bids Kafu to sing a song that will change the world before taking his leave. Kafu returns to her normal self, but has fallen to nihilism and believes the world is no longer worth saving because she believes it's fake. Sekai explains to the other witchlings Maxwell's claim Kamitsubaki is a constructed world, and they all become concerned what would happen if Kafu sings in her current state. As Koko tries to learn more about her magic, Maxwell initiates the second Blackout, attacking the city with a massive horde of Tesseractors that breach the city's shield. To make things worse, clones of the witchlings' familiars also appear among the Tesseractors. Koko and Rime try their best to ward off the Tesseractors, only for Kafu to once again succumb to her nihilism and begin her full transformation into a Tesseractor. Meanwhile, Haru and Sekai do their best to protect Area 2, are unable to save the Area 2 residents, who are all Haru's friends. In addition, Sekai, Agni, and Anemos are all apparently killed in the fighting. Seeing that she has failed to protect anybody, Haru falls to despair and transforms into a Tesseractor as well.
9	"Desire"; Transliteration: "Yokubō -Desire-" (Japanese: 欲望 -Desire-)	Yūmaro Chiba & Asuka Abe	Asako Kugoyama	Shinsuke Akano	September 5, 2025
Koko and Rime get into argument whether they should return to City Hall or go to Area 2 to look for Haru and Sekai. Meanwhile, Tesseractor Haru begins attacking the other Tesseractors indiscriminately, including Agni, and then Maxwell when he captures the barely conscious Sekai. Maxwell then appears in front of Kafu, Koko, and Rime and tries to further provoke Kafu to sing her current state. Koko retaliates with her ice magic, and Haru is able to take Sekai away in the confusion. Maxwell then seals himself, Kafu, Koko, and Rime away in a sealed dimension, and summons a clone of Kugel who kills Koko. Rime attempts to sing, but cannot bring herself to, with Maxwell revealing Rime already learned about Kamitsubaki's true nature from her father's research. Seeing Rime is in danger, Hastur self destructs to open a breach in the sealed dimension for Laplace, Haru, and Sekai to enter. However, Maxwell easily suppresses all of them and Kafu begins to sing a song that turns her into a full Tesseractor and destroys all of Kamitsubaki permanently.
10	"Virtual Real -Artificial real-" Transliteration: "Kasō to Genjitsu -Artificial real-" (Japanese: 仮想と現実 -Artificial real-)	Tatsuhiro Okada	Midori Gotō	Tatsuhiro Okada	September 12, 2025
Kafu appears to awaken in the real life Shibuya, where she witnesses the real world's counterparts of herself and her friends as virtual singers for the band Virtual Witch Phenomenon. Kafu observes one of VWP's performances, particularly her real world counterpart Kaf. Suddenly, Sophia the Witch appears among the audience and revives the witchlings, explaining that she had converted them into information energy and transported them to the real world to keep them safe. She explains that her control of Kamitsubaki has degraded ever since Maxwell, a virus that feeds on information, causes the Blackouts to harvest information from the dead. As a last resort, Sophia created the Phenomenon as a failsafe. However, when she heard Kafu's song of despair, she realized her plan was flawed and halted the Phenomenon. Sophia then explains she can send them back to Kamitsubaki to save the city, but since their data has been overwritten, the Phenomenon is no longer an option so any death will be permanent. She gives the witchlings a choice: they can stay in the real world as entities of pure information, or return to Kamitsubaki. Realizing that she wants to create a world where she can truly be alive, Kafu decides to go back, along with the rest of the witchlings.
11	"Regenerate"; Transliteration: "Saisei -Regenerate-" (Japanese: 再生 -Regenerate-)	Asuka Igarashi	Asago Kuboyama	Shinsuke Akano	September 19, 2025 (Note: This episode aired at 1:04 a.m. JST, 1 hour and 8 minutes after the original air time on TBS.)
Using their song, the witchlings are able to return to Kamitsubaki using their familiars as an anchor. However, since Hastur destroyed himself and his memory orb, Rime has no way to return and is trapped between dimensions. Maxwell confronts the witchlings, demanding they tell him how to reach the Upper World, but they point out a being that cannot understand human emotions will never achieve it. Angered, Maxwell tries to produce copies of the witchlings to replicate their song, but they are all flawed. Through the power of Kafu's song, the RD Chief is revived, and Koko inserts Kugels memory orb into a Kugel clone, reviving him as well. The witchlings then sing a new song that's able to guide Rime back to Kamitsubaki as well as revive Hastur. Maxwell then malfunctions, since his programmed role was to reconstruct people from Fragments. With the witchlings having learned that power, his role has become redundant and he is subsequently deleted. The witchlings continue to sing, using Maxwell's collected Fragments to revive the people of Kamitsubaki.
12	"Kamitsubaki City Under Construction"; Transliteration: "Kamitsubaki-shi Kensetsu-chū -Under construction-" (Japanese: 神椿市建設中 -Under construction-)	Yoshikazu Miyao	Midori Gotō	Hiroki Itai	September 25, 2025
The witchlings under the direction of the newly revived RD Chief start helping rebuilding the city as well as eliminating the last remnants of Maxwell's Tesseractors. However, not all of the people of Kamitsubaki were brought back, leaving the city only partially populated. Rime comes up with the theory that in the heat of the moment, they were only able to bring back the people who they were the closest to personally, and reasons that if they can get the rest of the population to think about their loved ones, they can revive everybody that was lost with their song. The witchlings agree to give it a try, and with the whole city joining in on the plan, the witchlings sing a new song that revives everybody else. Afterwards, Kafu promises to the audience that she will "change tomorrow's world".
