= Hashimero =

Japanese singer

Hashimero はしメロ
- Genre: J-pop
- Occupations: Singer; songwriter; composer
- Instrument: Vocals
- Label: Sacra Music

Hashimero (はしメロ) is a Japanese singer, songwriter and composer. After going viral as vocalist for Maisondes' song "Show Me Your Phone", she released an EP, Natsuyasumi, in 2024. She has also done theme music for Urusei Yatsura (2024), Ayaka Is in Love with Hiroko! (2024-2025), and Witch Watch (2025).

== Biography ==
Hashimero released a music video for her song "Yokusu" (浴す) in May 2020 after starting her music career around that year. One of her songs, "Mirror Mirror" (みらみら), was streamed more than two million times globally by 2022. In addition to releasing several songs digitally in 2023 – "Merimi (Marry Me)", "Mine", "Bad Dream", "Gonna Come", and "Take Out" – she performed Maisondes' song "Show Me Your Phone" as vocalist, lyricist, and composer, charting on the Billboard Japan TikTok Weekly Top 20 on 6 September 2023 and getting more than 700 million views by the end of the year.

In 2024, she and MeguriMeguru performed Maisondes' song "Lock On", the opening theme of the third cour of the 2022 Urusei Yatsura series. She performed "Palette" and "Yosumi", the opening themes for the 2024-2025 Ayaka Is in Love with Hiroko! drama. Her EP Natsuyasumi was released on 28 August 2024. She sang two commercial songs that year: Cup Noodles' "Laksa Tabete yo-hen", Maisondes' self-parody of "Show Me Your Phone"; and "Kawaii KM" for Canmake's Metallook Mascara brand.

She performed "Tokihanate", the opening theme song for the second cours of Witch Watch (2025). Her major label debut EP of the same name will be released through Sacra Music on 27 August 2025, including the titular song and both of her Ayaka Is in Love with Hiroko! songs. That same month, Fujimoto of Real Sound called her a breakout star for the second half of 2025, saying that "her energetic vocals, blended with rap, and her confident, electronically-driven sound are at the heart of Reiwa pop culture".

== Discography ==
=== Extended plays ===
| Title | Year | Details | Peak chart positions | | Sales | Ref. |
| Title | Year | Details | JPN | JPN Comb. | Sales | Ref. |
|---|---|---|---|---|---|---|
| "Natsuyasumi" (なつやすみ) | 2024 | Released: 28 August 2024 | — | — | — | |
| "Tokihanate" (ときはなて!) | 2025 | Released: 27 August 2025; Label: Sacra Music | — | — | — | |

=== Singles ===
| Title | Year | Details | Peak chart positions | | Sales | Ref. |
| Title | Year | Details | JPN | JPN Comb. | Sales | Ref. |
|---|---|---|---|---|---|---|
| "Merimi (Marry Me)" (メリみ) | 2023 | Released: April 2023; Format: Digital | — | — | — | |
| "Mine" (in low-caps) | 2023 | Released: May 2023; Format: Digital | — | — | — | |
| "Bad Dream" (わるいゆめ) | 2023 | Released: June 2023; Format: Digital | — | — | — | |
| "Gonna Come" (がなかむ) | 2023 | Released: July 2023; Format: Digital | — | — | — | |
| "Take Out" (テイクアウト) | 2023 | Released: October 2023; Format: Digital | — | — | — | |
| "Kawaii KM" (かわいいkm) | 2024 | Released: 4 October 2024; Format: Digital | — | — | — | |

=== Other songs ===
| Title | Year | Ref |
|---|---|---|
| "Show Me Your Phone" (けーたいみしてよ) (by Maisondes; as vocalist) | 2023 | |
| "Lock On" (ロックオン) (by Maisondes) | 2024 | |
| "Laksa Tabete yo-hen" (ラクサ食べてよ篇) | 2024 | |
