= Asmi (singer) =

- Born: Asumi Fujihashi; January 5, 2001 (age 25); Osaka Prefecture, Japan
- Occupation: Musician
- Years active: 2019–present
- Labels: Mastersix Foundation; Echoes
- Website: www.rooftop.tokyo/asmi

Asumi Fujihashi (藤橋 明日未, Fujihashi Asumi; born January 5, 2001), known professionally as Asmi (stylized in lowercase), is a Japanese singer from Osaka Prefecture who is currently affiliated with Echoes. She debuted as an indie musician in 2019, releasing songs digitally and online. In 2022, she released her first anime song, "Ienai", which served as the ending theme for the second season of the television series Rent-A-Girlfriend. Her music has also been featured in anime series such as Urusei Yatsura and Pokémon Horizons: The Series.

== Biography ==
Asmi was born in Osaka Prefecture on January 5, 2001. She was interested in music from an early age, largely inspired by her older sister. In high school, she served as manager of the light music club, which had over 100 members. The club also participated in a national competition and won a prize in the chorus division. After graduating from high school, she started attending a vocational school, where she furthered her skills and learned to play the guitar.

Asmi started her music activities in 2019 with the release of her first single, "Osanpo", that year. The following year, she won the grand prize at Jūdai Hakusho, a Kansai-based talent search for young artists. She also released her first album Bond that same year.

In 2021, Asmi gained attention for her participation in the music project Maisondes. She performed the song "Yowanehaki" (ヨワネハキ) for the project, which gained popularity on TikTok and also led to her appearing on the YouTube channel The First Take.

In 2022, Asmi performed a song for an anime for the first time, singing the song "Ienai" (言えない) for the television series Rent-A-Girlfriend; the song was composed by music producer MIMiNARI. In 2023, she sang the song "Ai Wana Muchuu" (アイワナムチュー), which was produced by Maisondes and was used as the second opening theme to the anime series Urusei Yatsura. Later that year, she sang the song "Dokimeki Diary" (ドキメキダイアリー), which is used as the first opening theme to the anime series Pokémon Horizons: The Series.

== Discography ==
=== Digital singles ===
Release date	Title	Album, EP
October 16, 2019	osanpo	
May 6, 2020	Lemon tea	bond
July 29, 2020	cream soda	bond
December 2, 2020	memory	
March 10, 2021	Tatoeba	humming
September 15, 2021	Call me	
February 9, 2022	Gerbera	
March 30, 2022	PAKU	
July 6, 2022	earth meal	
August 24, 2022	PAKU - From THE FIRST TAKE	
November 23, 2022	wish	
March 22, 2023	BLACK COFFEE	
April 14, 2023	Dokimeki Diary feat. Chinozo	
August 8, 2023	Mousou Kyakuhon Shippitsu Katsudou	
October 23, 2023	Kaisei	
November 1, 2023	Tokimeki Diary - With ensemble	
November 1, 2023	Zutto - With ensemble	
November 17, 2023	Osaka Rendezvous	
April 3, 2024	UTAGE (feat. Rinne, Kubota Kai, Anatsume, ICARUS & Kizuna)	
July 15, 2024	UTAGE REMIX (feat. Rinne, Kubota Kai, Anatsume, ICARUS & Kizuna)	
August 28, 2024	Akkun	
October 22, 2024	Kocchi Muite Hoi	
December 11, 2024	Ooki na Tamanegi no Shita de	
February 7, 2025	Tegami	
April 22, 2025	Sonna Mon ne	
May 7, 2025	Err	
June 18, 2025	Tokyo no Yoru	
July 8, 2025	Kimi ga Kureta Mono	
