= Tanaka (musician) =

- Also known as: Boku no Lyric no Bōyomi (ぼくのりりっくのぼうよみ, Boku no Ririkku no Bōyomi; "Reading My Lyrics Monotone"), Shigaisen (市街戦; "Street Fighting"), Shigaisen (紫外線; "Ultraviolet")
- Born: February 12, 1998 (age 28)
- Origin: Yokohama, Kanagawa, Japan
- Genres: J-pop; hip hop; R&B
- Occupations: Singer; songwriter; rapper
- Instrument: Vocals
- Years active: 2014–
- Label: Connectone
- Website: bokuriri.com

Tanaka (Japanese: たなか; born February 12, 1998) is a Japanese rapper, vocalist and lyricist. He was known by the moniker Boku no Lyric no Bōyomi (ぼくのりりっくのぼうよみ, Boku no Ririkku no Bōyomi; "Reading My Lyrics Monotone") from 2014 to 2018. In 2021, Tanaka formed a band with Ichika Nito and Sasanomaly called Dios.

== Life and career ==
Tanaka (birth name unknown) was born in Yokohama, Japan, and went to school in the same area. He first became interested in releasing music in junior high school, and began uploading songs on the Japanese video streaming service Nico Nico under the moniker Shigaisen (市街戦; "Street Fighting") from February 2012, at the age of 14. This name (later changing the name to Shigaisen (紫外線; "Ultraviolet")) was his utaite moniker, a Nico Nico specific term for a person who uploads sung vocal covers of Vocaloid songs. Among the songs he covered were Ishifuro's "Yurufuwa Jukai Girl", Denpol-P's "Hitorinbo Envy" and Hachi's "Donut Hole".

Tanaka became interested in rap music through the Nico Nico community Nico Rap, especially a rapper in the community called Vacon. After becoming friends, Vacon inspired Boku no Lyric no Bōyomi to try releasing original rap songs. In late 2012, he uploaded his first rap song, "One Night Stand and Rain". He decided on his stage name late at night while uploading the song, arbitrarily choosing the phrase Boku no Lyric no Bōyomi (ぼくのりりっくのぼうよみ; "Reading My Lyrics Monotone"). He felt that his voice while rapping sounded as if he were singing in a monotone instead of rapping, so decided on the name because of this. Originally he wanted to form a band, however did not have any friends who wanted to join in. As a student at an elite high school, he found that his friends had little interest in music, so he decided to release music as a solo act.

In April 2014, Boku no Lyric no Bōyomi released a free to download extended play through the independent hip-hop label Idler Records, a label run by Denpa Girl member Hashishi. Later in 2014, he was announced as one of the finalists of the Tokyo FM teen music contest Senkō Riot, after submitting the song "Sub/objective" because it had the biggest response on the internet. Boku no Lyric no Bōyomi submitted another song, "Fuckin' Summer Vacatioooooon!!!!!!!!!!!", for the contest's annual contestant compilation album.

In December 2015, Tanaka released his debut album Hollow World as Boku no Lyric no Bōyomi through newly founded JVC Kenwood Victor Entertainment sub-label Connectone, His second album Noah’s Ark (2017) features a collaboration with Latin jazz producer Nicola Conte, and "Be Noble", the theme song for the film March Comes in like a Lion Part 1 (2017).

In September 2018, Boku no Lyric no Bōyomi announced that he would leave the music industry, by releasing a final studio album, Botsuraku, and a compilation album, Ningen, on December 12. In 2019, he announced that he would change his stage name to Tanaka. In April 2021, Tanaka formed a band with Ichika Nito and Sasanomaly called Dios.

In 2025, he contributed to the original soundtrack of the Netflix original series Glass Heart.

== Discography ==
=== Studio albums ===
List of albums, with selected chart positions
Title	Album details	Peak positions	
Title	Album details	JPN Oricon	JPN Billboard (Note: Sources for chart positions are as follows: Hollow World, Noah's Ark, Fruits Decaying, Botsuraku, Ningen.)
Hollow World	Released: December 16, 2015; Label: Connectone; Formats: CD, digital download	39	17
Noah’s Ark	Released: January 25, 2017; Label: Connectone; Formats: CD, digital download	24	22
Fruits Decaying	Released: November 22, 2017; Label: Connectone; Formats: CD, 2CD, 2CD/DVD, digital download	18	15
Botsuraku (没落; "Downfall")	Released: December 12, 2018; Label: Connectone; Formats: CD, digital download	20	17

=== Extended plays ===
List of extended plays, with selected chart positions
Title	Album details	Peak positions	
Title	Album details	JPN Oricon	JPN Billboard
Parrot's Paranoia	Released: April 30, 2014; Label: Idler Records; Formats: Free digital download	—	—
Dystopia (ディストピア, Disutopia)	Released: October 12, 2016; Label: Connectone; Formats: CD, digital download	26	— (Note: Charted at number 27 on the Billboard Top Single Sales chart.)
"—" denotes items which were ineligible to chart, or charted on a Billboard sub-chart.

=== Compilation albums ===
List of compilation albums, with selected chart positions
Title	Album details	Peak positions	
Title	Album details	JPN Oricon	JPN Billboard
Ningen (人間; "Human")	Released: December 12, 2018; Label: Connectone; Formats: CD, digital download	32	47

=== Singles ===
List of singles, with selected chart positions
Title	Year	Peak chart positions		Album
Title	Year	JPN Oricon	JPN Billboard (Note: Sources for chart positions are as follows: "Patchwork", "Sub/objective", "Newspeak", "After That", "Be Noble", "Sky's the Limit", "Wana", "Boku wa Mō Inai".)	Album
"Patchwork" (パッチワーク, Pacchiwāku)	2015	—	86	Hollow World
"Sub/objective"	2015	—	39	Hollow World
"Newspeak"	2016	—	73	Dystopia / Noah's Ark
"After That"	2016	—	53	Noah's Ark
"Be Noble"	2017	77	50	Noah's Ark
"Sky's the Limit"	2017	45	27	Fruits Decaying
"Tsuki to Sanagi" (つきとさなぎ; "The Moon and a Chrysalis")	2017	45	—	Fruits Decaying
"Wana" (罠; "Trap") (featuring Soil & "Pimp" Sessions)	2017	—	85	Fruits Decaying
"Rinne Tensei" (輪廻転生; "Reincarnation")	2018	—	— (Note: Charted at number 77 on the Billboard Download Songs Chart.)	Botsuraku
"Boku wa Mō Inai" (僕はもういない; "I'm Not Here Anymore")	2018	—	86	Botsuraku
"—" denotes items that were ineligible to chart on Oricon singles chart, or items that did not chart.

=== Guest appearances ===
List of non-single guest appearances with other performing artists
Title	Year	Other artist(s)	Album
"Sunrise"	2014	Nqrse	Compilation Album W.W.W 2014
"Cock Pitt"	2014	Rikon Nozaki, Shakabooz, Nera_K, Twoface	None
"Fuckin' Summer Vacatioooooon!!!!!!!!!!!"	2014	None	Senkō Riot 2014
"Idler Stella"	2015	Denpa Girl, Nera_K, Rikon Nozaki	Who
"Fukurou Session featuring Boku no Lyric no Bōyomi (streamed online live on 2016.06.21)"	2016	Sakanaction	"Tabun, Kaze" (single)
"Game of Life"	2017	Sasanomaly	Game of Life
"Kubinawa" (クビナワ)	2017	Denpa Girl, Sasanomaly	Health
"Nanisama" (何様; "Someone")	2018	Sky-Hi	Best Catalyst: Collaboration Best Album
Suspected, Confused and Action	2019	Asca	
Foolish	2019	Teddyloid	Silent Planet: Infinity

== Songwriting credits ==
List of songs written by Boku no Lyric no Bōyomi for other artists.

Year	Song	Artist	Album	Co-written with
2018	"Kiss Is My Life"	SingTuyo (Shingo Katori and Tsuyoshi Kusanagi)	"Kiss Is My Life" (single)	Yoshi Kenkai (Loyly Lewis)
2018	"Anymore"	Miyakawa-kun	Star Land	Yoshi Kenkai (Loyly Lewis)
