= Minami (singer) =

Japanese singer

Minami 美波
- Born: September 14, 1997 (age 28); Saitama, Japan
- Genres: J-Pop; rock
- Occupations: Singer; songwriter
- Instruments: Vocals; guitar
- Years active: 2015–present
- Labels: FlyingDog (2019); Warner Music Japan (2020-2024); Water Reflection (Note: Self-Owned Label) (2024-present)
- Website: www.373official.com

Minami (美波; born September 14, 1997) is a Japanese singer and songwriter from Saitama, currently releasing her music independently.

Minami won the second FlyingDog Audition Grand Prix in 2017, and later signed onto FlyingDog under Victor Entertainment in 2019. On June 30, 2020, she transferred to Warner Music Japan. She ended her contract with Warner Music japan and became an independent artist again in the end of 2024 (Announced by Minami herself during the concerts of Earthtication tour).

== Biography ==
Minami was born in the city of Saitama in Saitama Prefecture. Influenced by the live performances of Yutaka Ozaki in high school, she took up guitar and participated in music activities. In 2017, the first Mini-Album "Emotional Water" and the first single "main actor" were released. On Tower Records in Shibuya, Sapporo, Sendai, Nagoya, Osaka, Hiroshima, Fukuoka, limited sales were made.

== Discography ==
=== Mini-Albums/Extended Plays ===
	Release date	Title	Catalog No.	Tracklist	Remarks
4th	March 22, 2023	LOSE LOOSE DAY	WPCL-13465 (Regular Edition) WPCL-13461 (Red Check / Limited Edition A) WPCL-13462 (Yellow Check / Limited Edition B) WPCL-13463 (Green Check / Limited Edition C)	5 songs: 1. ルードルーズダンス (RUDE LOSE DANCE); 2. グッドラッカー (GOOD LUCKER); 3. ブルーグラス (BLUE GURASU); 4. BLANK POST; 5. タイムグラム (TIME GRAM)	Limited Edition A [WPCL-13461] includes the Comic "Rude Loose Dance". Limited Edition B [WPCL-13462] includes Original Playing Cards. Limited Edition C [WPCL-13463] includes Radio CD.
3rd	July 21, 2021	DROP	WPCL-13313 (Regular Edition) WPCL-13311 (Cell Ver. / Limited Edition A) WPCL-13312 (Masquerade Ver. / Limited Edition B)	5 songs: 1. アメヲマツ、 (Ame Wo Matsu,); 2. フライハイト (Freiheit); 3. DROP; 4. この街に晴れはこない (Kono Machi Ni Hare Wa Konai); 5. 君と僕の１５４小節戦争 (Kimi To Boku No 154 Shosetsu Senso)	Limited Edition A [WPCL-13311] includes the Canvas Art "Cell". Limited Edition B [WPCL-13312] includes the Canvas Art "Masquerade".
2nd	January 30, 2019	カワキヲアメク / Kawaki Wo Ameku	VTCL-35294 (Regular Edition) VTCL-35295 (Anime Edition)	5 songs: 1. カワキヲアメク (Kawaki Wo Ameku); 2. main actor 3. ライラック (Lilac); 4. ホロネス (Hollowness); 5. Prologue	Regular Edition [VTCL-35294] does not include track 5. Anime Edition [VTCL-35295] does not include track 4 and has different artwork on the cover promoting the Domestic Girlfriend anime series from which the OP theme features the title track.
1st	June 21, 2017	Emotional Water	2050267813644	4 songs: 1. 水中リフレクション (Suichuu Reflection); 2. 先生、あのね (Sensei, ano ne); 3. 海と夏と君と (Umi to Natsu to Kimi to); 4. 正直日記 (Shoujiki Nikki)	Released by Tower Records in Japan.

=== Singles ===
	Release date	Title	Catalog No.	Tracklist	Remarks
6th	November 13, 2025	Kissing the machine		1 song: 1. Kissing the machine	
5th	January 27, 2023	ルードルーズダンス RUDE LOSE DANCE		1 song: 1. ルードルーズダンス (RUDE LOSE DANCE)	
4th	November 10, 2022	GOOD LUCKER		1 song: 1. GOOD LUCKER	
3rd	June 30, 2020	アメヲマツ、/ Amewomatsu	B08BBYTJZ2	1 song: 1. アメヲマツ、 (Amewomatsu)	Released by Warner Music Japan.
2nd	February 21, 2018	ETERNAL BLUE	Self-Released	2 songs: 1. Monologue; 2. 正直日記 long ver. (Shoujiki Nikki long ver.)	Different single unrelated to the song "Eternal Blue" of the same name.
1st	December 1, 2017	main actor	2050267839712	2 songs: 1. main actor 2. プロローグ (Prologue)	

=== Miscellaneous ===
• groping
• ハル-あと3cmの冬-
• F and B (FとB)
• 傘を忘れた日
• 放課後オレンジヒーロー (After School Orange Hero)
• Deep-sea fish
• プレッシャーボーイズ (Pressure Boys)
• サイダーみたいだ (Like a Cider)
• Summer time game!!
• issue
• 星屑のうた (Hoshikuzu no uta)
• カレーライス (Curry Rice)
• アスター (Astor)
• 留年確定
• ETERNAL BLUE
• 雪見だいふくの歌
•ヘナ (Hena) ( Originally meant to be part of DROP EP, lately abandoned by Minami)
•Luna say maybe (for Gakuen Idolmaster)
