= Yuika =

- Gender: Female

Origin
- Origin: Japanese
- Meaning: Different meanings depending on the kanji used

Yuika (written: 優衣香 or ユイカ in katakana) is a feminine Japanese given name. Notable people with the name include:

- Yuika Motokariya (本仮屋 ユイカ; born 1987), Japanese actress
- Yuika Shiwahime (志波姫 唯華), fictional character in Hanebad!, a Japanese sports manga
- Yuika Sugasawa (菅澤 優衣香; born 1990), Japanese women's footballer
- Yuika (singer) (『ユイカ』; born 2005), Japanese singer-songwriter

== See also ==
- Yaeko
- Yaïka
- Yoiko
- Yuiko
