= Millennium Family =

Japanese manga series

- First tankōbon volume cover

踊る千年家族 (Odoru Sennen Kazoku)
- Genre: Action; Comedy
- Manga
- Written by: Akira Kasugai
- Published by: Shōnen Gahōsha
- English publisher: NA: Orange Inc.
- Imprint: Young King Comics
- Magazine: Young King OURs
- Original run: March 30, 2021 – present
- Volumes: 9
- Anime television series
- Directed by: Masato Jinbo
- Written by: Masato Jinbo
- Studio: PartsCraft
- Original network: TBS
- icon

Millennium Family (Japanese: 踊る千年家族, Hepburn: Odoru Sennen Kazoku) is a Japanese manga series written and illustrated by Akira Kasugai. It began serialization in Shōnen Gahōsha's Young King OURs magazine in March 2021, and has been compiled into nine volumes as of July 2026. An anime television series adaptation produced by PartsCraft has been announced.

== Plot ==
Theodore Benfield, a British man currently living in Japan, is suddenly taken by his siblings after their younger sister Rhyne is kidnapped. He and his six siblings have long been the subject of interest by criminal organizations and scientists due to being immortal. In the middle of their flight to America, their private jet is destroyed, injuring but not killing them. After rescuing Rhyne, Theodore's siblings decide to start living with him in Japan, wanting to lay low from their pursuers.

== Characters ==
Theodore Benfield (テオドール・ベンフィールド, Teodōru Benfīrudo)
Voiced by: Rikuya Yasuda
One of the Benfield siblings, he was born in Scotland but currently lives in Japan. After his sister Rhyne's rescue, his siblings start staying at his apartment, the first time in several centuries that they have lived together as a family.
Hayden Benfield (ヘイデン・ベンフィールド, Heiden Benfīrudo)
Voiced by: Katsuyuki Konishi
The eldest son of the Benfield siblings.
Hugo Benfield (ヒューゴ・ベンフィールド, Hyūgo Benfīrudo)
Voiced by: Ryōta Suzuki
The second son of the Benfield siblings.
Eve Benfield (イヴ・ベンフィールド, Ivu Benfīrudo)
Voiced by: Lynn
The eldest daughter of the Benfield family.
Noel Benfield (ノエル・ベンフィールド, Noeru Benfīrudo)
Voiced by: Taihi Kimura
The third son of the Benfield family.
Raine Benfield (ライネ・ベンフィールド, Raine Benfīrudo)
Voiced by: Haruna Mikawa
The second daughter of the Benfield family.
Arthur Benfield (アーサー・ベンフィールド, Āsā Benfīrudo)
Voiced by: Mutsumi Tamura
The fifth son and youngest child of the Benfield family.

== Media ==
=== Manga ===
Written an illustrated by Akira Kasugai, the series began serialization in Shōnen Gahōsha's Young King OURs magazine on March 30, 2021. The first tankōbon volume was released digitally on September 23, 2021, and physically on September 30, 2021; nine volumes have been released as of July 30, 2026. The series is also released digitally in English on Orange Inc.'s Emaqi service.

No.	Release date	ISBN
1	September 23, 2021 (ebook); September 30, 2021 (print)	978-4-7859-7003-1
2	April 30, 2022	978-4-7859-7130-4
3	November 30, 2022	978-4-7859-7284-4
4	June 29, 2023	978-4-7859-7431-2
5	January 30, 2024	978-4-7859-7599-9
6	August 30, 2024	978-4-7859-7757-3
7	March 28, 2025	978-4-7859-7899-0
8	October 30, 2025	978-4-7859-8058-0
9	July 30, 2026	978-4-7859-8251-5

=== Anime ===
An anime television series adaptation was announced on July 27, 2026. It will be produced by PartsCraft and directed by Masato Jinbo who will also handle series composition, with characters designed by Hiroshi Yoneda, who will also serve as chief animation director. The series is set to air on TBS and other channels.

== Reception ==
The series was ranked third in the I Want to Deliver It to the World! category at the first Rakuten Kobo E-Book Awards in 2023.
