= The Ogre's Bride =

Japanese light novel series

- First light novel volume cover, featuring Reiya Kiryuin (left) and Yuzu Shinonome (right)

鬼の花嫁 (Oni no Hanayome)
- Genre: Romantic fantasy
- Novel series
- Written by: Kureha
- Published by: Novema
- Original run: 2019 – present
- Light novel
- Written by: Kureha
- Illustrated by: Yū Shiroya
- Published by: Starts Publishing
- Imprint: Starts Shuppan Bunko
- Original run: October 28, 2020 – present
- Volumes: 9
- Manga
- Written by: Kureha
- Illustrated by: Jun Togashi
- Published by: Starts Publishing
- English publisher: NA: MangaPlaza
- Imprint: Noicomi Comics
- Magazine: noicomi
- Original run: December 24, 2021 – present
- Volumes: 10
- Live-action film
- Directed by: Chihiro Ikeda
- Written by: Manato Hamada
- Music by: Erina Koyama
- Studio: Darwin Inc.
- Licensed by: Shochiku
- Released: March 27, 2026
- Runtime: 122 minutes
- Anime television series
- Directed by: Kazuhito Ōmiya
- Written by: Yumi Kamakura
- Music by: Masaru Yokoyama
- Studio: Colored Pencil Animation Japan
- Licensed by: Crunchyroll: SEA: Medialink
- Original network: Tokyo MX, GYT, GTV, BS11, CBC, ytv, FBS, SBS, HTV, HTB, tbc, RSK, AT-X
- Original run: July 5, 2026 – September 20, 2026
- Episodes: 12
- icon

The Ogre's Bride (Japanese: 鬼の花嫁, Hepburn: Oni no Hanayome) is a Japanese light novel series written by Kureha and illustrated by Yū Shiroya. It began serialization as a web novel on the Novema website in 2019. The series was later acquired and published by Starts Publishing under their Starts Shuppan Bunko imprint in October 2020. A manga adaptation illustrated by Jun Togashi began serialization in Starts Publishing's noicomi digital magazine in December 2021. A live-action film adaptation premiered in Japanese theaters in March 2026. An anime television series adaptation produced by Colored Pencil Animation Japan aired from July to September 2026.

== Synopsis ==
Yuzu Shinonome, an ordinary high school student living in a world where Japanese demons and humans coexist, has been treated unfairly by her parents, who dote on her younger sister, Karin, who was chosen as the bride of a fox spirit. Furthermore, her boyfriend breaks up with her because he has fallen in love with Karin, even though she has already been chosen as the bride. After that, Karin demands Yuzu to give her a dress she received as a birthday present from their grandparents, who have always been kind to her. However, when Yuzu refuses, it develops into a sisters' quarrel, and as a result, the dress is torn, and Yuzu, enraged, raises her hand against Karin. Enraged that his bride, Karin, has been hurt, the fox spirit Kozuki Yota pours flames on Yuzu, burning her hands. Thus, Yuzu, who ran away from despair at not being loved or needed by anyone at home, happens to meet Kiryuuin Reiya, the next head of the Kiryuuin clan, the highest-ranking ayakashi. Reiya then tells Yuzu, "I've missed you, my bride."

== Characters ==
Yuzu Shinonome (東雲 柚子, Shinonome Yuzu)
Voiced by: Hina Suguta, Manaka Iwami (reading play), Saori Hayami (anime)
Portrayed by: Ai Yoshikawa
A high school girl who has never been loved by anyone before except by her grandparents, as she has been neglected by her parents and bullied by her sister. She has good relationships with friends and teachers at school, and her grandparents are worried about her. While she is kind and considerate, she also has the personality of silently enduring difficult and painful things.
Reiya Kiryuin (鬼龍院 玲夜, Kiryūin Reiya)
Voiced by: Masaaki Mizunaka, Toshiki Masuda (reading play), Yūichirō Umehara (anime)
Portrayed by: Ren Nagase
A demon spirit who is the next head of the Kiryuin clan. He has jet black hair and red eyes, and an inhumanly beautiful appearance. He is expressionless and ruthless, but has high charisma. He is only kind to his bride Yuzu, whom he falls in love with.
Kooni (子鬼) / Sou (ソウ) and Ao (アオ)
Voiced by: Momoka Terasawa (Sou), Miyu Kobashi (Ao) (anime)
Two beasts that Reiya created with his spiritual power, taking appearance of children. Sou is distinguished by his white hair, while Ao has black hair. Though small in stature, they possess great abilities, hence them serving as Yuzu's bodyguards.
Karin Shinonome (東雲 花梨, Shinonome Karin)
Voiced by: Akari Kageyama, Sayaka Senbongi (reading play), Manaka Iwami (anime)
Yuzu's younger sister and a bride to a fox spirit named Yota. Unlike Yuzu, she has a sociable personality; though, having been deeply loved and thoroughly spoiled by her parents and Yota, she grew up in an environment where no one dared to defy her groom. Because of this, she is very selfish and immature mentally and behavior-wise, and looks down on Yuzu, and refuses to acknowledge that she has been chosen as the "demon's bride". Karin is eventually rejected as Yota's bride by Nadeshiko following her assault on Yuzu during the demon gathering while she and her parents were subsequently banished.
Yota Kogetsu (狐月 瑶太, Kogetsu Yōta)
Voiced by: Yuto Suzuki, Chiaki Kobayashi (reading play), Ryōta Ōsaka (anime)
A fox spirit who has Karin for his bride. This high-ranking, wealthy spirit among the spirits dotes on Karin and is prepared to do anything for her. Yota receives double payback for burning Yuzu's arm by being burned alive by Reiya, but survived because Reiya held back. Despite being nearly killed by Reiya and knowing that he is risking a death sentence if he messes with the Kiryuins, Yota is unable to disobey Karin's wishes to break up Reiya and Yuzu's engagement. He is later confronted by Reiya and Nadeshiko, questioning his willingness to grant his bride's wishes, as brides can become curse if they are led astray by them and he has lost sense of reason. Yota is then given one final warning by Nadeshiko, who tests his relationship with Karin to see whether he can control her behavior during a demon social gathering in which Reiya brings Yuzu. However, Yota fails and Karin is no longer his bride after she assaulted Yuzu.
Touko (透子)
Voiced by: Nichika Ōmori (reading play), Sayaka Senbongi (anime)
Yuzu's best friend. She is the bride to a cat demon, Toukichi. A headstrong girl, Touko sympathizes with Yuzu's situation and hates her parents and her sister Karin for the abuse.
Toukichi Nekota (猫田 東吉, Nekota Tōkichi)
Voiced by: Genki Okawa (reading play), Natsuki Hanae (anime)
A cat demon who takes Touko as his bride, he goes by the nickname "Nyankichi". He dotes on Touko, but she dominates him. He has weak spiritual powers and a lower demon rank.
Araki Takamichi (荒鬼 高道, Takamichi Araki)
Voiced by: Taito Ban (anime)
Reiya's primary secretary and chauffer, Takakmichi is very loyal towards Reiya since childhood. He is rumored to have a "romantic relationship" with Reiya, but this is revealed to be false. He later becomes Sakurako's current fiancé.
Ouga Kiyama (鬼山 桜河, Oniyama Ōga)
Voiced by: Nobunaga Shimazaki (anime)
He is the son of the head of the Kiryūin family's primary branch, and is Sakurako's brother. He works alongside Reiya and Araki.
Sakurako Kiyama (鬼山 桜子, Oniyama Sakurako)
Voiced by: Aya Endō (anime)
A beautiful female ogre who is Ouga's younger sister. She is Reiya's former fiancée and the daughter of the head of the Kiryūin family's primary branch. She possesses immense spiritual power, and believed that Reiya and Takamichi are in a relationship, which is revealed to be false. She later becomes engaged with Takamichi, whom she has had feelings for since childhood.
Yukinosuke Tsumori (津守 幸之助, Tsumori Yukinosuke)
An onmyoji who is hostile towards Reiya.
Mikoto Ichiryuusai (一龍斎 ミコト, Ichiryūsai Mikoto)
The daughter of a family with the protection of a dragon.
Sen'ya Kiryuin (鬼龍院 千夜, Kiryūin Sen'ya)
Voiced by: Akira Ishida (anime)
The current head of the Kiryuin family and Reiya's father. Despite his appearance and immense power, he acts carefree, unlike his son.
Sara Kiryuin (鬼龍院 沙良, Kiryūin Sara)
Voiced by: Misato Fukuen (anime)
Sen'ya's wife and Reiya's mother. Although her marriage to Sen'ya is arranged, the couple has a good relationship.
Nadeshiko Kosetsu (狐雪 撫子, Kosetsu Nadeshiko)
Voiced by: Kaho Kōda (anime)
Portrayed by: Machiko Ono
The current head of the Kosetsu family, the pinnacle of the fox spirits. She speaks in an old-fashioned way. She is usually calm, but can be ruthless depending on the situation as shown when she learns that Yota harmed Yuzu, who is revealed to be Reiya's bride. Nadeshiko, along with Reiya, confronts Yota over his actions that will cause a rebellion against the Kiryuins. She also gives Yota a final warning he will lose Karin forever if harm comes to Yuzu ever again while testing him to control Karin's behavior on the night of the social gathering. When Karin assaulted Yuzu during the gathering, Nadeshiko subsequently rejects Karin as Yota's bride and exiles her from the Kogetsu family.

== Production ==
When the author found out that "Novema! Character Short Story Contest" was being held on the theme of "Ayakashi x Romance" on "Novema!", he was thinking about what to write for his submission when the phrase "I've found my bride" and the scene of the two meeting came to mind. He submitted this story to the contest, won the Excellence Award, and it was later decided that the story would be published as a book.

The author points out that one thing he is careful about is "not to overdo Reiya's expressions of affection". This is due to the author's belief that "no matter how much you love someone, there is a line that you cannot forgive", and citing the scene where Reiya makes Yuzu quit her part-time job without permission, the author said that he was conscious of "showing love in a way that is considerate of the other person, without being pushy".

== Media ==
=== Light novel ===
No.	Title	Release date	ISBN
Arc 1
1	運命の出逢い	October 28, 2020	978-4-81-370993-0
2	波乱のかくりよ学園	December 28, 2020	978-4-81-371025-7
3	龍に護られし娘	May 28, 2021	978-4-81-371097-4
4	前世から繋がる縁	September 28, 2021	978-4-81-371156-8
5	未来へと続く誓い	December 28, 2021	978-4-81-371195-7
Shinkon-hen (新婚編)
6	新たな出会い	August 28, 2022	978-4-81-371314-2
7	強まる神子の力	February 24, 2023	978-4-81-371397-5
8	消えたあやかしの本能	July 28, 2023	978-4-81-371461-3
9	もうひとりの鬼	May 24, 2024	978-4-81-371589-4

=== Manga ===
A manga adaptation illustrated by Jun Togashi began serialization in Starts Publishing's noicomi digital magazine on December 24, 2021. The manga's chapters have been collected in ten tankōbon volumes as of July 2026.

The manga is published in English on NTT Solmare's MangaPlaza website.

No.	Release date	ISBN
1	August 25, 2022	978-4-81-376124-2
2	February 24, 2023	978-4-81-376176-1
3	July 28, 2023	978-4-81-376210-2
4	January 26, 2024	978-4-81-376271-3
5	May 24, 2024	978-4-81-376316-1
6	November 22, 2024	978-4-81-376377-2
7	June 13, 2025	978-4-81-376443-4
8	December 26, 2025	978-4-81-376541-7
9	March 27, 2026	978-4-81-376572-1
10	July 10, 2026	978-4-81-376622-3; 978-4-81-376623-0 (SP)

=== Reading play ===
A reading play of the series was performed at Hamagin Hall Viamare between November 18 and 19, 2023.

=== Live-action film ===
A live-action film adaptation was announced on December 3, 2025. The film is produced by Shochiku and directed by Chihiro Ikeda from a screenplay written by Manato Hamada. It premiered in Japanese theaters on March 27, 2026.

=== Anime ===
An anime television series adaptation was announced on June 10, 2025. It is produced by Colored Pencil Animation Japan and directed by Kazuhito Ōmiya, with Yumi Kamakura handling series composition, Hikari Tanaka designing the characters, and Masaru Yokoyama composing the music. The series aired from July 5 to September 20, 2026, on Tokyo MX and other networks. (Note: Tokyo MX listed the series premiere on July 4 at 24:30, which is effectively July 5 at 12:30 a.m. JST.) The opening theme song is "Hitokoto" (ヒトコト; 'A Word'), performed by ClariS, and the ending theme song is "Shinboshi" (心星), performed by Ikusaburo Yamazaki. Crunchyroll is streaming the series. Medialink licensed the series.

==== Episodes ====
No.	Title	Directed by	Written by	Storyboarded by	Original release date
1	"Destiny"; Transliteration: "Unmei" (Japanese: 運命)	Zhu Yi-han	Yumi Kamakura	Yumi Kamakura	July 5, 2026
Following a devastating war, demons emerged from the shadows to save humanity, quickly rising to dominate politics, industry, and finance with their supernatural powers and beauty. Because demons treat their destined human brides with profound love and devotion, every woman dreams of marrying one. Yuzu Shinonome's boyfriend, Yamato, dumps her after developing a crush on her sister Karin, even though Karin is already the spoiled bride of the wealthy fox demon Yota. Yuzu's home life is miserable as her parents neglect her in favor of Karin, as Yota has made them wealthy. The only affection Yuzu receives is from her paternal grandparents. When Karin destroys Yuzu's birthday dress from her grandparents, Yuzu snaps and hits her. In retaliation, Yota mercilessly burns Yuzu's arm. Receiving no sympathy from her parents despite the severe burns, Yuzu runs away. While crying on a bridge, she encounters Kiryuin Reiya, an ogre demon and heir to the world's most powerful ogre tribe. Recognizing Yuzu as his bride, Reiya heals her wounds and offers her the love she desperately needs.
2	"Special Someone"; Transliteration: "Tokubetsuna Sonzai" (Japanese: 特別な存在)	Ri Jiu	Yōichi Katō	Katsuhito Ōmiya	July 12, 2026
Reiya takes Yuzu to his mansion, where his servants welcome her. Despite not being used to kindness, Yuzu opens up to Reiya about her family's abuse and being burned by Yota. Reiya's aide, Takamichi, uncovers Yuzu's severe mistreatment by her family and the identity of Yota's family, the Kogetsu clan. Having found his bride, Reiya ends his arranged engagement to Ouga Oniyama's sister, Sakurako. The next morning, Yuzu meets Sou and Ao, three-inch-tall yokai created by Reiya to protect her. Reiya also surprises Yuzu by having her grandparents' dress perfectly repaired. When he offers protection and care along with her grandparents' arrangement for her adoption, Yuzu feels overwhelmed. Yuzu receives a message from Karin and distracts Sou and Ao before slipping away. But when she meets up with Karin and Yota, Karin maliciously discards all Yuzu's belongings into the river, demanding she beg on her knees to return home. A distraught Yuzu returns to Reiya, expecting him to be angry, but is met only by his love and comfort.
3	"Decision"; Transliteration: "Ketsudan" (Japanese: 決断)	Kaihang Chen	Deko Akao	Katsuhito Ōmiya	July 19, 2026
Yuzu and Reiya visit her parents to finalize her adoption by her grandparents. When Yota threatens her, Reiya intervenes, terrifing Yota. Yuzu's father attempts to hit her for causing trouble, but Reiya throws him across the room. When Karin tells Yota to kill Reiya, Reiya sets Yota on fire until Yuzu asks him to stop. Upon learning Yuzu has been chosen to be Reiya's bride, her parents reluctantly sign the adoption papers. Yuzu admits to her grandmother her fear of Reiya's ruthlessness, but her grandmother reassures her it proves the strength of his love. Humiliated, Karin vows revenge against Reiya. Reiya reveals he is the heir of the Kiryuin clan, daring Karin to tell Yota's family he has put their Kogetsu clan at risk by harming an ogre's bride. Karin refuses to accept Yuzu as Reiya's bride and grows jealous, so she demands Yota break them up to make her happy. Despite knowing he barely survived Reiya's fury, and that opposing the Kiryuin clan means certain death, Yota's instincts force him to obey his bride's wishes.
4	"Is Their Love for Their Brides Eternal?"; Transliteration: "Hanayome e no Ai wa Eien ka?" (Japanese: 花嫁への愛は永遠か？)	Masa Mori	Yōichi Katō	Kōichi Ōhata	July 26, 2026
Yuzu becomes the new Lady of Reiya's household, with Yukino and Doukuu as her servants. Meanwhile, Reiya informs his parents, Senya and Sara, of finding his bride. His parents turn out to be childish and overly-doting, and he finds the separation from Yuzu unexpectedly difficult. Realizing she is late for work at a cafe, Yuzu rushes out, only to learn her employment has been terminated. Upset, she visits her friend Touko, bride to the cat demon Nyankichi. Noticing Yuzu is covered with Reiya's overwhelming spiritual energy, Nyankichi warns her that wandering alone makes her an easy target for Reiya's enemies, as human brides are ogres' only exploitable weakness. Though touched by her friends' joy for her, Yuzu admits her fear of becoming entirely dependent on Reiya. Reiya, upset she went missing, arrives and is relieved to find her safe. He is also glad to meet her friends and hopes they continue to support her. Upon returning home, Yuzu finds out that Reiya actually ended her employment so he can fully support her, sealing his promise with a kiss.
5	"My Rival is a Capable Secretary"; Transliteration: "Raibaru wa Yūnō Hisho" (Japanese: ライバルは有能秘書)	Zhu Yi-han	Deko Akao	Takanari Satō	August 1, 2026
Yuzu is overwhelmed by Reiya's strong feelings for her, but he respects her desire to continue working and hires her at the Kiryuin Group. However, school becomes chaotic when Touko reveals Yuzu's status as the ogre's bride. Yuzu also learns of Reiya's former political engagement with Sakurako. At work, Reiya's aide, Takamichi, shows disapproval towards Yuzu. Takamichi constantly outperforms her with his instinctual awareness of what Reiya wants or needs. Yuzu questions Takamichi about her working; Takamichi admits it is unusual for a bride and implies it makes Reiya look incapable of supporting her in front of the other clans. Though Reiya scolds Takamichi for telling her this, Yuzu feels guilty for inconveniencing Reiya again. Takamichi recalls how he first met Reiya as children, where Reiya's serious personality inspired his lifelong loyalty. On Yuzu's 18th birthday, Yuzu receives thoughtful presents and retroactively written letters from Reiya for her past 17 birthdays. Overjoyed, Yuzu insists on repaying his kindness, and Reiya asks for a kiss whenever she feels ready.
6	"Touko and Nyankichi"; Transliteration: "Tōko to Nyankichi" (Japanese: 透子とにゃん吉)	Ri Jiu	Yumi Kamakura	Daigo Kunoshita	August 8, 2026
Takamichi complains to Ouga that Yuzu is unfit to be Reiya's bride, believing Reiya should have stayed engaged to Sakurako. Although Sakurako claims to accept the outcome as normal in demon society, the branch families furiously object to the broken engagement, and Sakurako secretly plans to teach Yuzu to know her place as Reiya's human bride. Overwhelmed by school, work, and Reiya's request for a kiss, Yuzu feels deeply uncertain. Touko notices her anxiety and reassures her, sharing how she initially rejected Nyankichi's persistent pursuit until his sudden disappearance. After Touko got jealous upon seeing Nyankichi with a woman who turned out to be his mother, it made her realize she loved him. Touko assures Yuzu that love grows over time and Reiya will eventually become the most important person in her life. When Reiya leaves to attend an annual demon social gathering, Yuzu decides to visit her grandparents. Unbeknownst to Reiya, Sakurako lies in wait to confront Yuzu alone.
7	"Reiya's Secret Lover"; Transliteration: "Reiya no Himitsu no Koibito" (Japanese: 玲夜の秘密の恋人)	Huo Chun-fu	Deko Akao	Guo Chen & Guo Mei-qi	August 15, 2026
Feeling inferior to Sakurako, Yuzu is told her sole purpose is birthing Reiya's children, and that Reiya will never love her because Takamichi is his secret lover. Sakurako leaves compromising photos, convincing Yuzu the affair is real. Sou and Ao try to tell Yuzu something, but she cannot understand their speech. Hiding her distress from her grandparents, Yuzu longs to call Reiya but fears bothering him. Meanwhile, Karin's jealousy festers as her parents plot to regain control of Yuzu, and thus Reiya's wealth, without angering Reiya himself. Noticing Yuzu's sadness, her grandmother recalls her own early trust issues with her husband, explaining how his love eventually erased her anxiety. This realization helps Yuzu realize she is in love with Reiya. Elsewhere, Reiya attends the clan leaders' gathering, too distracted by his thoughts of Yuzu to focus. Later, Yota hypnotizes Yuzu's guards, allowing Karin to access their grandparents' home.
8	"The Bewitching Visitor"; Transliteration: "Genwaku no Raihō-sha" (Japanese: 幻惑の来訪者)	Shi-ting Liang & Yan Zu-yu	Yōichi Katō	Chen Si-hao	August 22, 2026
Yuzu receives a sudden visit from her parents along with Yota and Karin. Yuzu's grandparents are skeptical of her parents' supposed concerns for her wellbeing. Yuzu rejects them for the abuse and not giving her unconditional love. Karin tries to manipulate her with the lies about Reiya and Takamichi, but Yuzu stands firm. When her father attempts to kidnap Yuzu, Sou and Ao intervene. Unable to withstand their power, Yota forces Karin and her parents to retreat, leaving Yuzu shaken. After Takamichi reports the incident, Reiya suspects Yota's involvement and demands a meeting with Nadeshiko, the leader of the Fox Clan. To maintain peace between the foxes and ogres, Karin is placed under house arrest while her parents are cut off from the Kogetsu's wealth entirely. Nadeshiko, who already warned Yota before about upsetting Reiya, gives him his last warning that Karin will be exiled if they attempt to harm Yuzu again. To test Yota, Reiya agrees to bring Yuzu to the final day of the social gathering, forcing Yota to prove he can control Karin's behavior.
9	"Self-Awareness"; Transliteration: "Jikaku" (Japanese: 自覚)	Zhu Yi-han	Deko Akao	Keisuke Inoue	August 29, 2026
Reiya's parents eagerly await meeting Yuzu at the social gathering. Fearing Sakurako's story was true, Yuzu kisses Reiya for the first time, and begs him not to leave her for Takamichi. Furious that Sakurako spread false rumors, Reiya reassures Yuzu that he has no romantic feelings for Takamichi, and he loves only her. When Yuzu confesses her own love, Reiya is overjoyed. Ouga apologizes profusely for Sakurako, who he reveals is a BL manga fan who took things seriously on hearing rumors of Reiya and Takamichi's romance. With the misunderstanding resolved, Yuzu asks Sakurako to teach her to be a proper Kiryuin bride. Takamichi also apologizes for his behavior, though he appears visibly exhausted the next morning after Reiya punishes him in an amusing manner for mistreating Yuzu. Later, Karin's parents blame her as they are forced to move away. After they demand she apologize to Yuzu, Karin furiously blames Yuzu for ruining her life.
10	"The Demon Banquet"; Transliteration: "Ayakashi no Shuen" (Japanese: あやかしの酒宴)	Yi Wang	Yōichi Katō	Tao Zhang	September 5, 2026
Anxious about meeting Reiya's parents, Yuzu is relieved when Senya and Sara warmly welcome her. On her way to the banquet, she is informed that her parents, still desperate for Reiya's wealth, ended up trapped in the security barrier after they tried to follow them. Reiya insists they brought it on themselves and Senya promises to retrieve them after the party. Karin attends the party with Yota, causing Yuzu to feel uneasy. Nadeshiko approaches Yuzu to officially apologize for Yota's behavior. However, a bitter Karin corners Yuzu privately, accusing her of ruining her life and demanding she return home to fix their family's finances. Yuzu stands her ground, pointing out Karin is fixated on her due to her own deep unhappiness, as she knows their parents only valued her for Yota's money. Affirming that she has found her own happiness, Yuzu declares she will never speak to Karin or their parents again. An immature Karin still blames Yuzu and attacks her, angrily shoving Yuzu down the mansion's main staircase.
11	"The Bride Sisters"; Transliteration: "Hanayome no Shimai" (Japanese: 花嫁の姉妹)	Nao Miyoshi	Deko Akao	Tomoya Takashima & Fukurō Kuma	September 12, 2026
In the past, Yuzu and Karin were once close as children. However, Karin was pressured by their parents to study and be accepted to Kakuriyo Demon Academy, hoping she would be chosen as a bride so they could live lavishly on her future demon husband's wealth. Their focus on Karin caused them to neglect Yuzu. On Karin's first day at Kakuriyo, she became Yota's bride. Her sudden elevation in social status and the constant praise from both the Kogetsu family and her own parents quickly turned her selfish and spoiled. As Karin grew up, she began to resent her parents' persistent reliance on her in asking Yota for more money, while growing jealous of Yuzu for the freedom she had from their parents' negligence. In the present day, Reiya catches Yuzu with his powers. After witnessing Karin's assault on Yuzu, Nadeshiko declares Karin is no longer Yota's bride. Yota cries over what Karin has done despite his warnings not to harm Yuzu. Karin attempts to justify her actions, but Yota tearfully tells Karin that they can't be together anymore; Karin is left horrified that she has actually lost everything.
12	"The Ogre's Bride"; Transliteration: "Oni no Hanayome" (Japanese: 鬼の花嫁)	Zhu Yi-han	Yōichi Katō	Tao Zhang	September 19, 2026
After Yota has failed to stop Karin due to his overindulgence towards his bride, Nadeshiko gives him time for a final goodbye to Karin, which a heartbroken Yota leaves a devastated Karin. Though feeling sorry for them, Yuzu moves on for a future with Reiya. The next day at school, Yamato admits to Yuzu that he was wrong about Karin and asks her to take him back. Realizing she never actually liked him, Yuzu politely rejects him despite Yamato's cruel claims about Reiya cheating on a plain girl like her; Sou and Ao punish Yamato for the insults. Later, Sakurako announces her engagement to Takamichi. Reiya explains marriages between their branch families are standard, and Takamichi matches Sakurako's power level so they will be capable of having children. Sakurako admits she has loved Takamichi since they were children and was thrilled when Yuzu became Reiya's bride instead. Reiya plans to marry Yuzu after college, though as Yuzu originally pictured marrying later in life, Reiya happily promises to wait until she is ready.

== Reception ==
The manga adaptation won the grand prize at NTT Solmare's Digital Comic Awards in 2023. The manga adaptation was also ranked third for the Tsutaya Comic Award in 2023.

== See also ==
- Bride of the Barrier Master, a novel series also written by Kureha
- The White Cat's Revenge as Plotted from the Dragon King's Lap, another light novel series written by Kureha
