= Pardon the Intrusion, I'm Home! =

Japanese manga series

- Cover of the first print volume, featuring Rinko Nakama

ただいま、おじゃまされます! (Tadaima, Ojamasaremasu!)
- Genre: Romantic comedy
- Manga
- Written by: Watomura
- Published by: NTT Solmare (digital); Enterbrain (print)
- English publisher: NA: MangaPlaza Yen Press (print)
- Imprint: B's Log Comics (print)
- Magazine: Koisuru Soirée
- Original run: October 17, 2020 – present
- Volumes: 26 (digital); 3 (print)
- Anime television series
- Directed by: Itsuki Imazaki
- Written by: Itsuki Imazaki; Makoto Takada
- Music by: Tomoki Hasegawa
- Studio: Tatsunoko Production
- Licensed by: Crunchyroll
- Original network: Nippon TV, ytv, BS NTV
- Original run: April 8, 2026 – present
- Episodes: 12
- icon

Pardon the Intrusion, I'm Home! (Japanese: ただいま、おじゃまされます!, Hepburn: Tadaima, Ojamasaremasu!) is a Japanese manga series written and illustrated by Watomura. It began serialization in NTT Solmare's Koisuru Soirée digital magazine in October 2020, and is also published online on the Comic CMoa online service and other websites. An anime television series adaptation produced by Tatsunoko Production premiered in April 2026.

== Plot ==
The series follows Rinko Nakama, a 24-year-old office worker who is a big fan of anime. Much to her co-workers' chagrin, she goes home early every day to watch anime. She lives next door to two men: Akito Satsuki, a handsome man who acts sweet around her, and Haruma Usada, a hot-headed man who seems to be irritated with her love for anime. After a certain incident, the three's apartments become connected through holes in the wall, leading to Rinko's life becoming more complicated.

== Characters ==
Rinko Nakama (仲間 凛子, Nakama Rinko)
Voiced by: Kana Hanazawa
A 24-year-old office worker and an otaku. She is a big anime fan, to the point she would go home early to watch instead of spending time with her co-workers. Recently, she has become a fan of the anime series Bunny and Cat Club. She keeps her otaku fandom a secret and was happy to start living alone to get away from her family.
Akito Satsuki (佐槻 鏡斗, Satsuki Akito)
Voiced by: Kaito Ishikawa
Rinko's neighbor, who has a kind personality. He is 28 years old and wears glasses.
Haruma Usada (右沙田 春真, Usada Haruma)
Voiced by: Haruki Ishiya
Rinko's neighbor, who has a violent personality. He is actually Usaharu, the original creator of Bunny and Cat Club. He has a rough personality and is conscious of the fact that he lives next door to a fan of his manga. He is 28 years old.
Kyō Honda (誉田 杏, Honda Kyō)
Voiced by: Chiaki Kobayashi
Hazuki Takamine (高峯 葉月, Takamine Hazuki)
Voiced by: Riho Sugiyama
Shion Kogi (小木 紫苑, Kogi Shion)
Voiced by: Miyu Tomita
Mao Usada (右沙田 真央, Usada Mao)
Voiced by: Sumire Morohoshi

== Media ==
=== Manga ===
The series began serialization in NTT Solmare's Koisuru Soirée digital magazine on October 17, 2020, with the series' chapters also being posted on the Comic CMoa website. 26 chapters and volumes have been released as of January 2025. The series is also published in a webtoon format, and a printed version began publication by Enterbrain under their B's Log Comics imprint on December 1, 2025. Three volumes have been released as of January 30, 2026. The series is released in English on the MangaPlaza website.

In March 2026, Yen Press announced that they had licensed the series for English publication, with the first volume set to release in September later in the year.

| No. | Original release date | Original ISBN | English release date | English ISBN |
|---|---|---|---|---|
| 1 | December 1, 2025 | 978-4-04-738697-6 | September 22, 2026 | 979-8-8554-4428-5 |
| 2 | December 27, 2025 | 978-4-04-738758-4 | February 23, 2027 | 979-8-8554-4533-6 |
| 3 | January 30, 2026 | 978-4-04-738790-4 | — | — |

=== Anime ===
An anime television series adaptation was announced on November 25, 2025. The series will be produced by Tatsunoko Production (with both Gonzo and Seven being credited with animation production assistance) and directed by Itsuki Imazaki, who is also handling series composition and writing the screenplays alongside Makoto Takada, with Shinsuke Kikuchi designing the characters and serving as chief animation director and Tomoki Hasegawa composing the music. It premiered on April 8, 2026 on Nippon TV's AnichU programming block and other networks. The opening theme song is "C'est la vie", performed by Bullet Train, and the ending theme song is "Sankaku Game" (さんかくゲーム; 'Triangular Game'), performed by Yuika. Crunchyroll is streaming the series.

==== Episodes ====
| No. | Title | Directed by (Note: Production staff information is taken from the ending credits of each episode.) | Written by | Storyboard by | Original release date |
|---|---|---|---|---|---|
| 1 | "Pardon the Intrusion, You're in My Home!?"; Transliteration: "Tadaima, Ojamasaremasu!?" (Japanese: ただいま、おじゃまされます!?) | Unknown | Unknown | TBA | April 8, 2026 |
| 2 | Transliteration: "Gisō Kareshi, hajimemashita!?" (Japanese: 偽装彼氏、はじめました!?) | Unknown | Unknown | TBA | April 22, 2026 |
| 3 | Transliteration: "Ippō, Sono Koro…!?" (Japanese: 一方、その頃…!?) | Unknown | Unknown | TBA | April 15, 2026 |
| 4 | Transliteration: "Suranpu ja, nē yo!?" (Japanese: スランプじゃ、ねーよ!?) | Unknown | Unknown | TBA | April 29, 2026 |
| 5 | Transliteration: "Kono Monogatari wa, Fikushondesu!?" (Japanese: この物語は、フィクションです!?) | Unknown | Unknown | TBA | May 6, 2026 |
| 6 | Transliteration: "Takaga, Kisu!?" (Japanese: たかが、キス!?) | Unknown | Unknown | TBA | May 13, 2026 |
| 7 | Transliteration: "Kurisumasu wa, Isogashī!?" (Japanese: クリスマスは、忙しい!?) | Unknown | Unknown | TBA | May 20, 2026 |
| 8 | Transliteration: "Mao wa, Maotoko no "ma o"!?" (Japanese: 真央は、間男の“ま・お”!?) | Unknown | Unknown | TBA | May 27, 2026 |
| 9 | Transliteration: "Sasuki-san no, Kakushigoto!?" (Japanese: 佐槻さんの、隠し事!?) | Unknown | Unknown | TBA | June 3, 2026 |
| 10 | Transliteration: "Ponkotsu, wan ko Sakusen!?" (Japanese: ポンコツ、わんこ作戦!?) | Unknown | Unknown | TBA | June 10, 2026 |
| 11 | Transliteration: "Sorezore no, Hōkai!?" (Japanese: それぞれの、崩壊!?) | Unknown | Unknown | TBA | June 17, 2026 |
| 12 | Transliteration: "Moichido, Ojama Saremasu!?" (Japanese: もいちど、おじゃまされます!?) | Unknown | Unknown | TBA | June 24, 2026 |
