= A Terrified Teacher at Ghoul School! =

Japanese manga series

- Cover of the first volume

妖怪学校の先生はじめました！ (Yōkai Gakkō no Sensei Hajimemashita!)
- Genre: Comedy horror; Fantasy comedy
- Manga
- Written by: Mai Tanaka
- Published by: Square Enix
- English publisher: NA: Yen Press
- Imprint: G Fantasy Comics
- Magazine: Monthly GFantasy
- Original run: November 18, 2014 – present
- Volumes: 21
- Manga

The Terrifying Students at Ghoul School!
- Written by: Mai Tanaka
- Published by: Square Enix
- English publisher: NA: Yen Press
- Magazine: PFantapy
- Original run: March 1, 2018 – present
- Volumes: 2
- Anime television series
- Directed by: Katsumi Ono
- Written by: Deko Akao
- Music by: Takahiro Inafuku
- Studio: Satelight
- Licensed by: Crunchyroll (streaming); SEA: Medialink
- Original network: Tokyo MX, ABC, BS Asahi
- Original run: October 8, 2024 – March 25, 2025
- Episodes: 24
- icon

A Terrified Teacher at Ghoul School! (Japanese: 妖怪学校の先生はじめました！, Hepburn: Yōkai Gakkō no Sensei Hajimemashita!) is a Japanese manga series written and illustrated by Mai Tanaka. It began serialization in Square Enix's Monthly GFantasy magazine in November 2014. An anime television series adaptation produced by Satelight aired from October 2024 to March 2025.

== Plot ==
Following a bad experience teaching at a public high school that resulted in a break from working, crybaby and timid novice teacher Haruaki Abe eagerly takes up a new job at Hyakki Academy. Despite his cowardice, the novice teacher is motivated to do better this time around. However, his mind quickly changes when he finds out that everyone at the school is actually a supernatural being known as a youkai, leaving him glaringly out of place as the only human around. Facing his class as its new homeroom teacher, Abe immediately becomes a target for the students' antics due to his quick-to-scare nature. While being tossed around by their supernatural powers known as youjutsu, he comes to know he has youkai exorcism power. Though as the man starts to learn more about the creatures, as well as himself, getting along with the unruly group might not be as hard as he originally thought as their school lives begin to get more vibrant.

== Characters ==
Haruaki Abe (安倍 晴明, Abe Haruaki)
Voiced by: Atsushi Abe (drama CD), Ryōta Ōsaka (anime)
Mikoto Sano (佐野 命, Sano Mikoto)
Voiced by: Kaito Ishikawa (drama CD), Ryōta Suzuki (anime)
Mamekichi Maizuka (狸塚豆吉, Maizuka Mamekichi)
Voiced by: Ayumu Murase (drama CD), Reon Tanie (anime)
Beniko Zashiki (座敷紅子, Zashiki Beniko)
Voiced by: Yoko Hikasa (drama CD), Akari Kitō (anime)
Rintarō Miki (神酒凛太郎, Miki Rintarō)
Voiced by: Kōji Yusa (drama CD), Shun Horie (anime)
Izuna Hatanaka (秦中飯綱, Hatanaka Izuna)
Voiced by: Yūki Ono (drama CD), Ryota Iwasaki (anime)
Kuniko Utagawa (歌川国子, Utagawa Kuniko)
Voiced by: Hana Ayasaka (anime)
Principal (学園長, Gakuen-chō)
Voiced by: Kenjiro Tsuda (drama CD), Jun Fukuyama (anime)
Kōtarō Hijita (泥田耕太郎, Hijita Kōtarō)
Voiced by: Yuichi Nakamura (drama CD), Taito Ban (anime)
Tamao Akisame (秋雨玉緒, Akisame Tamao)
Voiced by: Yoshitsugu Matsuoka (drama CD), Yuki Sakakihara (anime)
Yanagida (柳田)
Voiced by: Tomokazu Sugita (anime)
Yakumo Mujina (狢八雲, Mujina Yakumo)
Voiced by: Daiki Hamano (drama CD), Takao Mitsutomi (anime)
Tōya Fuji (富士冬也, Fuji Tōya)
Voiced by: Saku Hyūga (anime)
Yuri Renjō (蓮浄ゆり, Renjō Yuri)
Voiced by: Nanako Mori (anime)
Makoto Yamazaki (山崎誠, Yamazaki Makoto)
Voiced by: Tomoaki Maeno (anime)
Marshmallow (マシュマロ, Mashumaro)
Voiced by: Chitose Morinaga (anime)
Chiisai Ojisan (小さいおじさん, Chīsai Ojisan)
Voiced by: Tetsuya Yanagihara (anime)
Rensuke Nyūdō (入道連助, Nyūdō Rensuke)
Voiced by: Toshiki Masuda (drama CD), Akira Takano (anime)
Akira Takahashi (たかはし明, Takahashi Akira)
Voiced by: Shouta Aoi (anime)
Amaaki Abe (安倍雨明, Abe Amaaki)
Voiced by: Gakuto Kajiwara (anime)
Isaburō Ebisu (恵比寿夷三郎, Ebisu Isaburō)
Voiced by: Ryōhei Kimura (anime)
Kurai Takahashi (たかはし暗, Takahashi Kurai)
Voiced by: Yū Fukuzawa (anime)

== Media ==
=== Manga ===
Written and illustrated by Mai Tanaka, A Terrified Teacher at Ghoul School! began serialization in Square Enix's Monthly GFantasy magazine on November 18, 2014. Its chapters have been compiled into twenty-one tankōbon volumes as of May 2026.

During their panel at Sakura-Con 2017, Yen Press announced that they licensed the manga for English publication.

A spin-off manga centered around Mamekichi Maizuka's freshman year, titled The Terrifying Students at Ghoul School! (妖怪学校の生徒はじめました！, Yōkai Gakkō no Seito Hajimemashita!), began serialization on the Pixiv Comic website under Square Enix's PFantapy brand on March 1, 2018. The spin-off's chapters have been collected into two tankōbon volumes as of June 2023.

The spin-off is published in English on Square Enix's Manga Up! Global app under the title A New Student at Ghoul School!. During their panel at MCM London Comic Con 2025, Yen Press announced that they had licensed the spin-off.

==== Volumes ====
No.	Original release date	Original ISBN	English release date	English ISBN
1	May 22, 2015	978-4-7575-4661-5	December 19, 2017	978-0-316-41417-3
2	October 27, 2015	978-4-7575-4787-2	April 10, 2018	978-0-316-44723-2
3	May 27, 2016	978-4-7575-4999-9	June 26, 2018	978-0-316-44726-3
4	November 26, 2016	978-4-7575-5172-5	September 18, 2018	978-0-316-44729-4
5	July 27, 2017	978-4-7575-5428-3	December 11, 2018	978-1-9753-2843-6
6	March 27, 2018	978-4-7575-5681-2	March 26, 2019	978-1-9753-2846-7
7	September 27, 2018	978-4-7575-5864-9	June 18, 2019	978-1-9753-3044-6
8	June 27, 2019	978-4-7575-6142-7	December 24, 2019	978-1-9753-8736-5
9	January 27, 2020	978-4-7575-6485-5	December 29, 2020	978-1-9753-1694-5
10	September 26, 2020	978-4-7575-6864-8	July 13, 2021	978-1-9753-2470-4
11	April 27, 2021	978-4-7575-7226-3	June 7, 2022	978-1-9753-3828-2
12	November 27, 2021	978-4-7575-7600-1	December 13, 2022	978-1-9753-4670-6
13	June 27, 2022	978-4-7575-7992-7	July 18, 2023	978-1-9753-6375-8
14	December 27, 2022	978-4-7575-8325-2	June 18, 2024	978-1-9753-7466-2
15	June 27, 2023	978-4-7575-8627-7	October 1, 2024	978-1-9753-9124-9
16	December 27, 2023	978-4-7575-8979-7	April 15, 2025	979-8-8554-0207-0
17	September 27, 2024	978-4-7575-9444-9	March 24, 2026	979-8-8554-1940-5
18	January 27, 2025	978-4-7575-9634-4	June 23, 2026	979-8-8554-2469-0
19	July 26, 2025	978-4-7575-9977-2	—	—
20	February 27, 2026	978-4-301-00344-1	—	—
21	May 27, 2026	978-4-301-00488-2; 978-4-301-00489-9 (SE)	—	—

==== The Terrifying Students at Ghoul School! ====
No.	Original release date	Original ISBN	English release date	English ISBN
1	January 27, 2020	978-4-7575-6486-2	November 25, 2025	979-8-8554-1847-7
2	June 27, 2023	978-4-7575-8628-4	September 22, 2026	979-8-8554-1849-1

=== Anime ===
An anime television series adaptation was announced on December 15, 2023. It is produced by Satelight and directed by Katsumi Ono, with Deko Akao handling series composition, Natsuki designing the characters, Hiroyuki Taiga handling monster design, and music composed by Takahiro Inafuku. The series aired from October 8, 2024, to March 25, 2025, on Tokyo MX and other networks. The first opening theme song is "Ebi Zori Turn!" (えびぞりターン！; Ebi Zori Tān!), performed by Four Eight 48, while the first ending theme song is "Bokurashisa" (僕らしさ), performed by Yuika. The second theme song is "Bakesōu na Kokoro" (化けそうなココロ), performed by Sou, while the second ending theme song is "Yōkai Rendezvous" (妖怪ランデブー; Yōkai Randebū), performed by Real Akiba Boyz. Crunchyroll streamed the series worldwide outside of East Asia. Medialink licensed the series in Southeast Asia and streams it on Ani-One Asia's YouTube channel.

==== Episodes ====
No.	Title	Directed by (Note: Production staff information is taken from the ending credits of each episode.)	Written by	Storyboarded by	Original release date
1	"Welcome to Hyakki Academy!"; Transliteration: "Yōkoso Hyaku Oni Gakuen e!" (Japanese: ようこそ百鬼学園へ！)	Kōkun	Deko Akao	Katsumi Ono	October 8, 2024
2	"Physical Exams Are Life-Threatening?!"; Transliteration: "Shintai Sokutei wa Inochigake!?" (Japanese: 身体測定は命がけ！？)	Harume Kosaka	Deko Akao	Harume Kosaka	October 15, 2024
3	"Panic! In Miki-sensei's Youkai Studies Class!!"; Transliteration: "Dai Konran! Miki-sensei no Yōkaigaku!!" (Japanese: 大混乱！神酒先生の妖怪学！！)	Hideko Tonokatsu	Deko Akao	Mitsuru Sōma	October 22, 2024
4	"An Interview with Haruaki?! Here Comes Youkai TV!"; Transliteration: "Haruaki ni Shuzai!? Yōkai Terebi ga Yattekita!" (Japanese: 晴明に取材！？妖怪テレビがやってきた！)	Fumio Maezono	Chiaki Nagai	Katsumi Ono	October 29, 2024
5	"I Know. Let's Go to Sensei's Family Home."; Transliteration: "Sōda, Sensei no Jikka Ikō." (Japanese: そうだ、先生の実家行こう。)	Kōkun	Deko Akao	Keiya Saitō	November 5, 2024
6	"Sports Day at Ghoul School!! ~Commences~"; Transliteration: "Yōkai Gakkō Taīku-sai!! ～Kaikai～" (Japanese: 妖怪学校体育祭！！～開会～)	Yūki Nishiyama	Seiichiro Mochizuki	Tatsuji Yamazaki	November 12, 2024
7	"Sports Day at Ghoul School!! ~Finishes~"; Transliteration: "Yōkai Gakkō Taīku-sai!! ～Kecchaku～" (Japanese: 妖怪学校体育祭！！～決着～)	Hideki Takayama	Seiichiro Mochizuki	Keiya Saitō	November 19, 2024
8	"Amaaki, Momoyama-san, and the Nudity Festival"; Transliteration: "Amaaki to Momoyama-san to Hadaka-sai" (Japanese: 雨明と桃山さんと裸祭)	Daisuke Tsukuchi	Shin Yoshida	Daisuke Tsukuchi	November 26, 2024
9	"Save Me, Seimei-kun! The Case of the Animal Youkai Abductions!!"; Transliteration: "Tasukete Hare Seimei-kun! Dōbutsu Yōkai Yūkai Jiken!!" (Japanese: 助けて晴明君！動物妖怪誘拐事件！！)	Kōkun	Chiaki Nagai	Harume Kosaka	December 3, 2024
10	"School Camp of Terror"; Transliteration: "Kyōfu no Rinkan Gakkō" (Japanese: 恐怖の林間学校)	Hideki Takayama	Seiichiro Mochizuki	Tatsuji Yamazaki	December 10, 2024
11	"Parent-Teacher Conference from Hell!"; Transliteration: "Jigoku no Sansha Mendan!" (Japanese: 地獄の三者面談！)	Maki Kamiya	Deko Akao	Keiya Saitō	December 17, 2024
12	"The Great Tokyo Haruaki Search!!"; Transliteration: "Tōkyō Hare Meidai Sōsaku!!" (Japanese: 東京晴明大捜索！！)	Masatoyo Takada	Shin Yoshida	Masatoyo Takada	December 24, 2024
13	"The Cursed Secondhand Book"; Transliteration: "Noroi no Furuhon" (Japanese: 呪いの古本)	Yuki Nishiyama	Deko Akao	Nanako Shimazaki	January 7, 2025
14	"Zashiki-san's Bed-and-Breakfast Home"; Transliteration: "Zashiki-san Ka no Minshuku" (Japanese: 座敷さん家の民宿)	Nobutaka Chikahashi	Seiichiro Mochizuki	Keiya Saitō	January 14, 2025
15	"Abe no Seimei, Haruaki Abe, and Shutendouji"; Transliteration: "Abe no Haruaki to Shutendōji" (Japanese: 安倍晴明と酒呑童子)	Maki Kamiya	Shin Yoshida	Tatsuji Yamazaki	January 21, 2025
16	"The Great Hyakki Academy Island Chase!!"; Transliteration: "Hyakki Gakuen tō Daitsuiseki!!" (Japanese: 百鬼学園島大追跡！！)	Ryo Miyata	Chiaki Nagai	Harume Kosaka	January 28, 2025
17	"Summer! The Ocean! Huh? It's Already August 31st..." Transliteration: "Natsuda! Umida! Are? Mō Hachigatsu San-jū-ichi Nichi da..." (Japanese: 夏だ！海だ！あれ？もう八月三十一日だ・・・)	Nobutaka Chikahashi	Deko Akao	Takaaki Ishiyama	February 4, 2025
18	"The Temporary Teacher, Ebisu-sensei"; Transliteration: "Rinji Kyōshi no Ebisu-sensei" (Japanese: 臨時教師の恵比寿先生)	Hideki Takayama	Seiichiro Mochizuki	Keiya Saitō	February 11, 2025
19	"Welcome to the Youkai Train"; Transliteration: "Yōkai Densha ni Yōkoso" (Japanese: 妖怪電車にようこそ)	Ryo Miyata	Shin Yoshida	Keiya Saitō	February 18, 2025
20	"The Night Parade Cultural Festival"; Transliteration: "Yakō Bunkasai" (Japanese: 夜行文化祭)	Maki Kamiya	Shin Yoshisa	Takeshi Mori	February 25, 2025
21	"The Underground Night Parade Cultural Festival"; Transliteration: "Ura Yakō Bunkasai" (Japanese: 裏夜行文化祭)	Yūto Shiina	Chiaki Nagai	Nanako Shimazaki	March 4, 2025
22	"Goodbye, Ren-Ren"; Transliteration: "Sayonara Ren-Ren" (Japanese: さよなら連々)	Harume Kosaka	Seiichiro Mochizuki	Harume Kosaka	March 11, 2025
23	"The Gashadokuro, Kuniko Utagawa"; Transliteration: "Gashiyadokuro Utagawa Kuniko" (Japanese: がしゃどくろ歌川国子)	Hideki Takayama	Deko Akao	Keiya Saitō	March 18, 2025
24	"The Bond Continuing with Ren-Ren. The Teacher from Ghoul School Will Do His Best!"; Transliteration: "Renren to Tsuzuku en. Yōkai Gakkō no Sensei Ganbarimasu!" (Japanese: 連々と続く縁。妖怪学校の先生がんばります！)	Ryo Miyata	Deko Akao	Katsumi Ono	March 25, 2025
