= The White Cat's Revenge as Plotted from the Dragon King's Lap =

Japanese light novel series

- First light novel volume cover

復讐を誓った白猫は竜王の膝の上で惰眠をむさぼる (Fukushū o Chikatta Shironeko wa Ryūō no Hiza no Ue de Damin o Musaboru)
- Genre: Fantasy; Isekai; Romance
- Novel series
- Written by: Kureha
- Published by: Shōsetsuka ni Narō
- Original run: January 28, 2015 – March 11, 2024
- Light novel
- Written by: Kureha
- Illustrated by: Yamigo
- Published by: Frontier Works
- English publisher: NA: J-Novel Club
- Imprint: ArianRose
- Original run: October 12, 2016 – present
- Volumes: 8
- Manga
- Written by: Kureha
- Illustrated by: aki
- Published by: Kadokawa Shoten
- English publisher: NA: Yen Press
- Imprint: Flos Comic
- Magazine: ComicWalker
- Original run: August 4, 2017 – present
- Volumes: 6

The White Cat's Revenge as Plotted from the Dragon King's Lap (復讐を誓った白猫は竜王の膝の上で惰眠をむさぼる, Fukushū o Chikatta Shironeko wa Ryūō no Hiza no Ue de Damin o Musaboru) is a Japanese light novel series written by Kureha and illustrated by Yamigo. It was originally serialized on the user-generated novel publishing website Shōsetsuka ni Narō from January 2015 to March 2024. It was later acquired by Frontier Works who began publishing it under their ArianRose imprint in October 2016. A manga adaptation illustrated by aki began serialization on Kadokawa's ComicWalker website under the Flos Comic brand in August 2017.

== Plot ==
One day, Japanese college freshman Ruri Morikawa, her childhood "friend" Asahi and several other students are yanked from Earth to the nation of Nadasha in a magical world, where Asahi is hailed as a prophesied priestess who will allegedly lead this realm to prosperity. Falsely accused of intending to assassinate Asahi, Ruri is unceremoniously taken to the deep forest and abandoned there. In the forest, she encounters a dragon hermit named Chelsie, who explains that Ruri is a Beloved Child (愛する子供, Aisuru Kodomo), a person with a strong magical aura which attracts the spirits who maintain the magic in this world. From one of the spirits, Ruri receives a magical bracelet which allows her to take the form of a cat at will.

After spending a couple of years in Chelsie's cottage, Ruri makes her way to the capital of the nearby Dragon Nation, where she catches the romantic affection of Jade, the ruling Dragon King. In time, Ruri finds herself involved in a number of turbulent conflicts as hostile parties strive to disrupt the political and magical balances of this world for their own gain. But as a Beloved Child who even commands the respect of this world's Supreme Spirits, and with her kind and sincere personality, Ruri takes up the fight against the forces which threaten her new home.

== Characters ==
=== Dragon King Nation ===
The Dragon King Nation is the largest and most prosperous empire in the other world, and a member of the Alliance of Four Nations. Its primary populace consists of dragons, who have the inherent ability to shapeshift into human form; but because of their aura, they tend to repel most normal animals, which renders them unable to keep pets. Dragon blood can also be used as an ingredient for powerful healing agents, but is deadly poisonous if not properly processed. While ruled by dragons, the nation's reign is benign and cosmopolitan, with everyone enjoying equal rights regardless of their ancestry; hence the realm is inhabited by a mixed balance of humans and beast folk. The title of the Dragon King is not hereditary; it is won by challenging and defeating the incumbent ruler in a public duel held every thirty years. Because of the dragons' inherent strength and toughness, it is also the militarily strongest realm.

Ruri Morikawa (森川 瑠璃, Morikawa Ruri)
An initially eighteen-year-old Japanese girl and the main protagonist of the series. She has her mother's platinum-blonde hair and eyes the color of lapis lazuli, which are the source of her first name. Despite her sufferings throughout her early life due to her childhood "friend"/nemesis Asahi, she has grown into a kind, modest and self-sufficient young woman, although her social isolation has made her somewhat clueless about interpersonal relationships, and she often moves to help others without properly thinking things through. Her aura as a Beloved Child is so potent that it even attracts several Supreme Spirits to her side, making her the strongest Beloved Child known in the series. She also ensures the spirits' loyalty by treating them as friends, not as servants.
After making her way to the Dragon King Nation, Ruri catches the eye and heart of the current Dragon King, Jade, and later becomes his wife and queen of the Dragon King Nation. Owing to a bracelet gifted to her by the Supreme Spirit of Time, she is able to shapeshift into the form of a small white cat, which she continues to use as a disguise or to act as a stress reliever for Jade. By the novel series' eighth volume, she gives birth to their first son Citrine, a full-blooded dragon and Beloved Child.
Jade (ジェイド, Jeido)
A dragon and the current ruler of the Dragon King Nation. He meets Ruri by chance shortly after her arrival in the royal capital and instantly becomes smitten with her. After she is quartered in the palace while disguising herself as a cat, she becomes his petting companion at Jade's request, who does not suspect that Ruri the cat and the mysterious girl he met are one and the same person. After Ruri's secret comes out, Jade begins wooing her to become his queen, which is made rather difficult because of Ruri's belief that he might like her more as a cat than as a human. Eventually, he succeeds in winning her heart, marries her, and becomes her doting husband.
Joshua (ヨシュア, Yoshua)
A spy for the Dragon King Nation, Claus' son, and Chelsie and Andal's grandson. On a reconnaissance trip to Nadasha, he witnesses Ruri's arrival in his world, and recognizing her as a Beloved Child, he asks the spirits to help her when she is abandoned in the woods. After he encounters Ruri again in the royal capital while she is disguised as a cat, he recognizes her by her spiritual aura and becomes a close confidant and friend, keeping her secret until Ruri freely reveals it. He is extremely skilled as a spy, capable of passing through another nation without being noticed, and therefore has gathered a lot of general knowledge about the other nations.
Chelsie (チェルシー, Cherushī)
An elderly dragon, Claus' mother and Joshua's grandmother, and the mate of former Beast King Andal. She lives as a hermit in a forest bordering Nadasha and makes her living as a herbalist. She is the first person Ruri meets after her abandonment in the forest of Nadasha, and it is she who reveals Ruri's status as a Beloved Child to her and teaches her how to interact with the spirits. In turn, Ruri considers Chelsie her grandmother and visits her whenever she's got the time.
Claus (クラウス, Kurausu)
One of King Jade's chief advisors, Chelsie and Andal's son, and Joshua's father. He first meets Ruri after she comes to his manor in cat form after having been directed there by Chelsie, and it is an off-handed comment about the general greedy nature of humans that compels Ruri to maintain her disguise for her initial time in the royal palace, believing that she would receive hostility if she revealed her human nature.
Finn (フィン, Fin)
The captain of the Dragon King's palace guard, Jade's personal bodyguard, and Ewan's older brother. He is one of the strongest dragons known, second only to Jade, and is considered a viable candidate for the throne if he ever succeeds in defeating Jade in a duel of succession.
Ewan (ユアン, Yuan)
Finn's temperamental younger brother, and a junior soldier at the Dragon King's palace. Owing to a human mother, Ewan has no magic in him and hence cannot perceive any spirits. He has an extreme brother complex and worships the ground Finn walks on. Because Ruri takes up so much of Finn's time after her arrival in the palace, he becomes wildly jealous of her and treats her derisively, despite her status as a Beloved Child. Upon learning about her true human nature after eavesdropping on her, Joshua and Euclase, he reveals this fact to Jade in an attempt to discredit her, only to receive a severe scolding and demotion. After a heart-to-heart talk with Ruri, he becomes her friend.
Rutile
A female dragon and Finn's fiancée. She is a soldier in the Dragon King's army, which is uncommon because female dragons are less inclined toward combat, but with her strength and skill she is considered second only to Finn. In fact, she is so combative that every reunion between them culminates in a (more or less) playful swordfight. Also, her androgynous beauty and tomboyish personality make her curiously popular with women, and she is a notorious flirt. After having spent several years in the Imperial Nation, she is called home by Jade and assigned as Ruri's personal bodyguard.
Euclase (ユークレース, Yūkurēsu)
The chancellor of the Dragon King Nation. A very beautiful androgyne, it is not explicitly made clear in the series whether they are actually male or female. After Ruri comes to the royal palace as a cat, they learn of her true nature as a human after accidentally overheaing Ruri and Joshua talking, but are sworn to secrecy. After Ruri's secret is revealed, they take her shopping for clothes, jewelry and other luxuries whenever they have the opportunity - not just to outfit Ruri, but also to indulge in their own love for fashion.
Quartz
Jade's predecessor as the Dragon King, and a brother figure to him. He fell passionately in love with Seraphie, a human witch, and abdicated his throne after her death in order to reunite with her reincarnation. To this goal, he made a pact with the Witch Queen of Yadacaine to help her in her research for resurrecting the dead, even to the point of sharing this knowledge with the Nadashans and the Church of God's Light in order to accelerate progress, which eventually turned out to be a futile undertaking. Initially he mistakes Ruri for his reborn lover and kidnaps her, but is eventually made aware of his error and is rejoined by Seraphie's spirit afterwards.
Seraphie
A human witch from Yadacain who became Quartz's beloved mate. Before she died from an incurable sickness, she bound her soul to a ring with which she intended to remain with her love forever. However, the ring was unknowingly put into her grave by Quartz and was later stolen by a thief, who died shortly after placing it in his dimensional storage space, where it remained until it is found by Ruri decades later, thus finally enabling her to rejoin Quartz.
Agate (アゲット, Aget)
An elderly dragon and one of Jade's advisors. Eager to see his king found a dynasty, he and the other elders have been pushing Jade into choosing a candidate for marriage. After Ruri's arrival and upon noting Jade's infatuation with her, Agate then does his best to see them married, and after their wedding tries to entice them into conceiving children as quickly as possible.
Amarna
A wandering saleswoman who is greedy but amiable. After Ruri meets and befriends her, she installs Amarna as the manager of a public hot bath house which Ruri has erected in the Dragon King Nation's capital, although that doesn't hinder Amarna from raking a profit whenever she sees a chance. She is an old acquaintance of Gibeon from their common time among the Reapers.
Weidt (ヴァイト, Vu~aito)
The first Dragon King, Lydia's first contract bearer and love interest, and the only Beloved Child in the history of the Dragon King Nation until Ruri's arrival. He is also known to have made a contract with Chi, which resulted in a prosperous yield of rare and valuable minerals for the Dragon King Nation for a time.

=== Spirits ===
Spirits are entities responsible for the existence of the magic which permeates the other world. They are naturally invisible, but persons with an at least vestigial affinity for magic can perceive them. There are four kinds of spirits: the Lesser Spirits, which appear as tiny winged fairies, Mid- and Higher-level Spirits, and the twelve Supreme Spirits, who occupy the rank of nobility among their kind. High- and Supreme-level Spirits can take physical form by inhabiting freshly deceased bodies, preferably of creatures attuned to their respective element, or certain inanimate objects. Spirits settle conflicts among each other by a majority vote, which can be influenced by a Beloved Child's presence.
Spirits tend to flock to beings with magical auras appealing to their specific element. Those individuals who attract spirits of all elements are known as Beloved Children; the stronger the aura is, the more spirits obey the respective Beloved Child. If a Beloved Child's aura is potent enough, Supreme Spirits can also bond with them after they are given a name, but this also depends on the respective sprit's personal preferences: they will not bond with a person they are not interested in. Because a strong spirit presence in a nation bestows fertility and prosperity to the land, Beloved Children are much revered and coveted by nations currently bereft of one. Spirits can also travel to other worlds, including Earth, although their presence there goes largely unnoticed.

Lydia (リディア, Ridia) / Time (時, Toki)
The Supreme Spirit of Time, who resides in a pocket dimension which is routinely used by the denizens of the other world as an extradimensional storage space and which she maintains until a respective owner dies and she lets their chamber and its contents fade into the void. She appears as a beautiful but spectral human woman with fairy wings. Since she is bound to her dimension, she cannot leave, although she can still communicate with and receive news from other spirits. After a curious Ruri enters her dimension for the first time, she befriends Lydia, and to alleviate the latter's loneliness, she visits her for tea and cookies whenever she has the chance. In gratitude for this offer of friendship, Lydia gifts Ruri her magical bracelet, along with a lot of other things from storage spaces gone unused. It is implied that Lydia and her former contract bearer, the first Dragon King, were lovers, although Lydia keeps denying it.
Kotaro (コタロウ, Kotaro) / Wind
The Supreme Spirit of Air, and the first spirit Ruri encounters in the other world. Drawn by her spiritual aura right after she was abandoned in the forests of Nadasha, he inhabits the body of an Earth-affiliated beast, which however renders him unable to use his full power and the ability to speak with her. After finding out that Ruri likes cute and cuddly things, he leaves this shell behind and instead inhabits the body of a freshly killed air-affiliated spirit wolf, with which he rejoins Ruri as her personal protector.
Rin (リン, Rin) / Water
The Supreme Spirit of Water. After being informed by Kotaro about his bond with Ruri and her appealing personality, she possesses the body of a creature similar to a clione (though this species is native to fresh water) and joins Ruri as her second protector and spirit companion.
Chi (カイ, Kai) / Earth
The Supreme Spirit of Earth, who is extremely whimsical and comes and leaves as the mood strikes him. In the series, he inhabits the body of a capybara bearing a constant sour frown.
Heat (ひー, Hi-) / Fire
The Supreme Spirit of Fire who currently inhabits the body of a very handsome penguin beast folk man. He is arrogant, hedonistic and flirtateous. For unknown reasons, his general behavior towards Ruri is condescending, and he continually belittles her verbally, much to her chagrin. In turn, however, he is easily spooked by Ruri's mother Riccia.
Tree
The Supreme Spirit of Trees, and guardian of the Spirit King Nation. Similar to Lydia, he is permanently bound to his domain.
Light
The Supreme Spirit of Light. She formed a contract bond with Seraphine and was tasked with watching over her mate Quartz after her death so he wouldn't commit suicide out of despair over her loss. This task also makes her complicit in abducting Ruri after Quartz mistakes her for his reincarnated mate. She has the ability to create shields which protect from either damage or detection.
Darkness
The Supreme Spirit counterpart of Light, and the only one capable of breaking through the former's barriers. He is also the contracted companion of Pearl, the queen of Yadacain.
Chibi (ちび) / Spirit of the Spring
A high-level water spirit in the form of a squirrel who was the provider for the main fountain in the village where Sango Suzuki appeared after her displacement into the other world. After Sango fed him some cola, the spirit attached itself to her, making a contract bond, and Sango named him "Chibi".

=== Japanese citizens ===
Riccia
Ruri's mother and Beryl's daughter. She is a former model and also a Beloved Child like her father and daughter; in fact, she knew from the beginning about Ruri's gift, but chose not to tell her in order not to spoil her. After learning from the spirits about Ruri's whereabouts, and because certain conditions would not allow Ruri to return to Earth while still alive, she and her family settled her affairs and then emigrated to the other world. Once having settled in the Nation of the Dragon King, she opens a clothes shop in the capital with the intent to revolutionize the local fashion world. Her formidable personality enables her to make such obnoxious personalities like Heat and Gibeon cower before her.
Kohaku
Ruri's father, a mild-mannered but serious diplomat who accompanies his wife and father-in-law to the other world to rejoin Ruri. Continued exposure to Riccia's aura has rendered him able to see spirits, but he is unable to converse with them.
Beryl
Ruri's grandfather, and a Beloved Child. Having served as a soldier in the Japanese Imperial Army in World War Two, he is still remarkably vigorous for his age because of his inborn magic. After accompanying his daughter and son-in-law to the other world and getting lost in transit due to interference from Yadacain, he meets and befriends Andal, the former Beast King, and with his help is reunited with his granddaughter at Chelsie's cottage. Adventurous and restless, and after a complaint from the nobles of the Imperial Nation about the presence of three Beloved Children in one realm, he later leaves to find adventures in this new world in the company of Andal and Chi, who finds their personalities quite compatible.
Asahi Shiomiya (篠宮あさひ, Shiomiya Asahi)
Ruri's childhood "friend", although this perception is entirely one-sided. Asahi was born with an innate magical ability which unconsciously charmed anyone around her, compelling them to give her privileged treatment, which made her completely spoiled and oblivious to reality. When Asahi attached herself to Ruri, she inadvertently became Ruri's nemesis because her bewitching aura made other people automatically resentful of Ruri, which resulted in the latter getting bullied during most of her formative years. When she and Ruri are summoned to the nation of Nadasha in the other world, she is passed off as a "legendary" Priestess Princess (巫女姫, Miko Hime) who is "prophesied" to lead the nation to prosperity. The King and High Priest actually use Asahi as a puppet figurehead to try and conquer the Dragon King Nation, only to fail miserably due to Ruri and her Supreme Spirit companions. After she is taken prisoner, she has her bewitchment talent suppressed and is sent to Idocrase, a farming community administered by Finn's parents, to live out the rest of her life in penance.
Sango Suzuki (鈴木三五, Suzuki Sango)
A sixteen-year-old Japanese girl who was abruptly displaced into the Dragon King Nation. In the first village she came to, she made a contract with a higher level spirit and learned about Beloved Children. Obsessively believing she is a Beloved Child, she comes to the Dragon King's palace to seek hospitality, and she is given shelter and employment as a maid. Despite her beliefs, she is not a Beloved Child, although she has a spiritual attunement for the Water element. In her disappointment over her situation, she initially becomes wildly jealous of Ruri; but after a talking-to by Rutile, she apologizes to Ruri and becomes Rutile's devoted fan.

=== Beast King Nation ===
The Beast King Nation, another member of the Alliance of Four Nations, is a realm encompassing a vast stretch of desert, which makes the presence of a Beloved Child all the more vital for its comfort. As a result, the populace - which consists primarily of beast folk - is highly reverent towards spirits and Beloved Children, and considers any offense against them a high-level crime demanding the harshest punishments. Full-blooded beast folk (contrary to human/beast folk hybrids, who bear visible animalistic traits) are able to shapeshift between a fully human form and their attuned beast form.

Celestine (セレスティン, Seresutin)
The Beloved Child of the Nation of the Beast King, who is a green-haired bird beast folk girl. One comic relief habit of hers is her excessive drinking when frustrated, despite her low alcohol tolerance. After she was saved as a child by Jade from Armand's ambitious brother who intended to usurp the rulership, she fell in love with him, to the point that she jealously drove any potential suitors away from him. While also growing jealous of Ruri once she appears in Jade's life, she is unable to do anything because of her strong reverence towards the spirits and her fear of incurring Jade's displeasure. After experiencing Ruri's friendliness and courage, and Jade's unwavering devotion towards her, Celestine grudgingly acknowledges her as the more suitable candidate for Jade's heart, founding a friendly rivalry between them.
Arman (アルマン, Aruman)
A lion beast folk man and the reigning Beast King. He keeps a large harem of seventeen wives (formerly nineteen until two of them attack Ruri out of ignorance, forcing him to banish them from his side). He is resentful toward his father and predecessor Andal, who had impulsively abdicated, leaving him to clean up the subsequent chaos.
Andal
Arman's father and predecessor as the Beast King, and Chelsie's mate. His unquenchable wanderlust is the reason why he is not living with Chelsie and has forsaken his royal position. After he befriends Ruri's grandfather Beryl, he leaves with him and Chi to have adventures.
Padparadscha
An immigrant from the neighboring hostile nation of Furgal, Padparadscha encountered Arman during one of his tours through his nation. Falling head over heels in love with her, Arman impregnated her and made her his first wife, but fearing hostilities from his subjects due to her origin and his harem's jealousy, he kept this news secret until it could be proclaimed safely. When Furgal invades, Paparadscha and Celestine barely escape to the Dragon King Nation, where Padparadscha safely gives birth to their daughter.

=== Spirit King Nation ===
The Spirit King Nation is a member of the Alliance of Four Nations. Like in the Beast King Nation, reverence towards the spirits is a cultural obligation, though to a lesser degree than in the former realm. It is also the only nation with one of the Supreme Spirits, the Spirit of Trees, as a permanent resident.

Gibeon
Gibeon is a cocky young rogue with brown skin and blonde hair, and a former member of the Reapers. He is the only surviving member of the royal family of Iolite, a nation which was destroyed by a hostile regime over twenty years ago. While still in his mother's womb, he received a blessing from the Supreme Spirit of Light, who bestowed him with a fraction of her power. Gibeon comes into conflict with Ruri and her friends when Spinel's mother hires him to steal a spirit wolf cub. He is apprehended and banished for his crimes, but is invited by Jade to move to the Dragon King Nation, much to the latter's regret afterwards because Gibeon has taken a fancy on Ruri. To keep him away from her, Gibeon is assigned to work as an aide for Euclase.
Awain
The founder and ruler of the Spirit King Nation. Despite a permanently angry-looking countenance, he is very popular with his people for his wise and benevolent rule. He is the last surviving member of a race called qilins, a human-like but unaging people.
Lapis
The Spirit King Nation's crown prince, his nation's Beloved Child, and a constant embarrassment to his father due to his antics. He shares his father's intimidating countenance, but not his racial gift of age-related immortality. Lapis also has the habit of falling head over heels for any pretty girl he beholds, up until another pretty girl catches his attention.
Spinel
Spinel is a daughter of the Sprit King Nation' noble house of Morga. As a human, she has no magic and is therefore unable to perceive spirits. Ignorant and spoiled rotten, she is easily manipulated by her mother into believing that she is Jade's promised bride (even though he has already married Ruri), a notion she pursues with reckless abandon.
Spinel's mother
Spinel's ambitious mother, and the second wife to the house of Morga. In order to increase her political prestige, she has brainwashed Spinel into believing that Jade has asked for her hand in marriage. She even poisoned the pup of a spirit wolf, a breed of rare beasts considered sacred in the Spirit King Nation, to use its body to concoct a powerful mind control elixir to bend the Dragon King to her will, but her plan was foiled when Kotaro took possession of the corpse. When another cub is born to the wolf pack, she hires Gibeon to steal it, but her plan is foiled by Ruri, and she is arrested for her crimes.

=== Imperial Nation ===
The Imperial Nation is the second greatest political power in the other world, a member of the Alliance of Four Nations, and the only one without a Beloved Child. Its population is chiefly human. Unlike in the Dragon King's nation, the title of Emperor or Empress is hereditary.

Adularia
The beloved ruler of the Imperial Nation. In the seventh volume of the novel series, she is poisoned with the same toxic substance which also caused Seraphie's death. After her death, her eldest son succeeds her, but his conservative views gradually bring the empire to near-ruin until his grandson succeeds in restoring it to its former glory.
Corundum
Adularia's imperial consort.
Roy
The empire's first-born prince. At twenty-seven, he is tall and has dark hair. When their mother is infected with a deadly sickness, he engages in a fierce quarrel with Samadan about the right of succession.
Mariano
The empire's second-born prince, at age twenty-five. He is engaged to a princess of a neighboring country and has expressed no interest in his brothers' fight for the throne.
Samadan
The empire's third-born prince. He is twenty-three years old and red-headed. When their mother dies, he and his elder brother Roy kick off a conflict about the succession, since Adularia has not named an heir and Samadanc believes himself more suitable because of his progressive mindset.
Orio
The empire's youngest prince, age twenty-one. Outwardly a gentle and timid person, he believes himself slighted by his elder brothers for their neglect of him and secretly plots to take the throne for himself. He poisons his mother and also nearly succeeds in killing his brothers Roy and Samadan, but Ruri and Jade's investigation of Adularia's death exposes him. As punishment for his crime, he is sentenced to death by poison.

=== Nadasha ===
A realm inhabited solely by humans, it is one of the most spirit-poor realms of the other world and therefore one of the least prosperous. For this reason, the rulers of Nadasha have constantly tried to conquer the Dragon King Nation for its wealth throughout their nation's history, despite the fact that the Dragonkin are far stronger than humans.

King of Nadasha
A conniving individual who intends to use Asahi as a puppet to rationalize another war with the Dragon King Nation. He conspires with his High Priest to use Spirit Slayer magic as bombs to kill off the Dragonkin army, with the cold-blooded intention of sacrificing Asahi as an unwitting suicide bomber to further their cause. Because of the intervention of Ruri and her Supreme Spirit friends, the scheme fails spectacularly, and Ruri is allowed to give the King and High Priest a thorough pummeling before they are imprisoned in the Dragon King Nation for life.
High Priest of Nadasha
The King's chief advisor, who is responsible for summoning Ruri and her fellow students from Earth.
Prince of Nadasha
The King's son, who conspires with the summoned Japanese students to falsely accuse Ruri of plotting Asahi's assassination and to abandon her in the deep woods to perish.

=== Cerulanda ===
Another nation with a chiefly human habitation.

Azelda
Azelda is the daughter of a peasant family. After her nature as a Beloved Child was found out, she was sheltered in the royal palace, but the privileged treatment she received there made her extremely selfish and imperious. After being targeted for assassination by the Church of God's Light sect, she is brought to the palace of the Dragon King Nation for her safety. Once there, she freely abuses her title, bullying the palace staff, igniting a heated feud with Celestine (who was also sent there after an attempt on her own life), and coveting to marry Jade. However, she finds herself bested by Ruri's stronger spiritual aura, and after viciously attacking her in a fit of jealously, she is stripped of her spiritual privileges by Kotaro, thus losing her status as a Beloved Child.

=== Yadacain ===
Yadacain is an isolated island nation just some distance off the coast of the Dragon King Nation. This nation has developed the use of Spirit Slayer magic, which absorbs spirit magic and is capable of destroying lesser spirits if used as a weapon, and synthesizes the captured mana for the use of their magic-users, who are called "witches". The first queen of Yadacain was the witch responsible for creating Ruri's bracelet.

Pearl
The current queen and Beloved Child of Yadacain, who has a contract bond with the Supreme Spirit of Darkness. She lost her fiancée to an assassin using an incurable poison. In her manic efforts to bring him back to life, she began researching ways to resurrect the dead using dragon blood elixir - which, however, only produced soulless zombies - and to use summoning magic to draw souls with mana from other worlds, which was the magic that brought Ruri to this world. She also entered a pact with Quartz, the former Dragon King, who wished to use her research to resurrect his beloved Seraphie. After she captures several dragons to stock up her depleted stores of dragon blood that Quartz had provided for her research, Jade and the Dragon King Nation army invade Yadacain and force her to destroy her Spirit Slayer magic, and her research is destroyed by Joshua, although she does manage to develop an antidote to the insidious poison.

=== Furgal ===
Furgal is a realm neighboring the Beast King Nation. It was founded by the relatives of Arman and their followers who were banished after participating in the power struggle following Andal's abdication. Since its foundation, Furgal has continuously attempted to conquer the Beast King Nation, but a serious incursion was prevented by Celestine's presence.

The Chūnibyō Duo
A pair of unnamed Japanese teenagers who, along with a busload of other civilians, were drawn to Furgal by a random aftereffect from Nadasha's summoning. Both being Beloved Children, they were spoiled with privileged treatment, turning them supremely arrogant and domineering and making them treat the spirits as mere tools of their whims. Brainwashed into believing that the Beast King Nation is hostile, they spearhead a conquest campaign which ends with Arman's capture and Celestine and Padparadscha's escape to the Dragon King Nation. Indignant at the misuse of spirits as weapons against her friends, Ruri infiltrates the Beast King's palace, freeing Arman and his captive soldiers and overwhelming the duo, thus thwarting the invasion. With their status as Beloved Children voided by Kotaro and Rin, they are imprisoned in the Dragon King Nation and sentenced to sewage cleaning duty, while the other civilians are sheltered as refugees.

=== Others ===
The Church of God's Light
A dangerous cult of zealots which was outlawed for calling spirit magic a heresy. After receiving knowledge of Yadacain magic from Quartz, they set out to restore their sect by recruiting members with promises to restore their deceased loved ones using reanimation magic. Operating inside a volcano within the Nation of the Beast King, their cult is smashed by Ruri, her spirit companions and the united forces of the Dragon and Beast Kings.
The Reapers
An organization reputed to be ruthless assassins for hire, but who actually helped people who wanted to escape unwanted or hazardous circumstances to "disappear", leaving a piece of paper with the picture of a black sickle left at their "strike" sites as a calling card. The organization dissolved after the death of their leader several years before the series' beginning; but their notoriety has caused the appearance of copycats who are performing actual assassinations under their name. Known ex-members of this group include Amarna and Gibeon.

== Media ==
=== Light novel ===
Written by Kureha, The White Cat's Revenge as Plotted from the Dragon King's Lap was originally serialized on the user-generated novel publishing website Shōsetsuka ni Narō from January 28, 2015, to March 11, 2024. It was later acquired by Frontier Works who began publishing it with illustrations by Yamigo under their ArianRose light novel imprint on October 12, 2016. Eight volumes have been released as of August 9, 2024.

During their panel at Anime NYC 2019, J-Novel Club announced that they had licensed the series for English digital publication. In February 2021, J-Novel Club announced that they would begin releasing print copies in October that same year.

No.	Original release date	Original ISBN	North American release date	North American ISBN
1	October 12, 2016	978-4-86134-937-9	March 24, 2020 (digital); October 26, 2021 (print)	978-1-7183-1995-0
2	February 10, 2017	978-4-86134-968-3	August 11, 2020 (digital); February 1, 2022 (print)	978-1-7183-1996-7
3	July 12, 2017	978-4-86657-024-2	October 27, 2020 (digital); April 19, 2022 (print)	978-1-7183-1997-4
4	December 12, 2017	978-4-86657-069-3	March 30, 2021 (digital); July 19, 2022 (print)	978-1-7183-1998-1
5	July 12, 2018	978-4-86657-149-2	July 20, 2021 (digital); October 4, 2022 (print)	978-1-7183-1999-8
6	August 10, 2021	978-4-86657-447-9	January 21, 2022 (digital); January 17, 2023 (print)	978-1-7183-2044-4
7	August 10, 2022	978-4-86657-564-3	May 18, 2023 (digital); March 12, 2024 (print)	978-1-7183-0506-9
8	August 9, 2024	978-4-86657-774-6	August 6, 2025 (digital); May 11, 2026 (print)	978-1-7183-0509-0

=== Manga ===
A manga adaptation illustrated by aki began serialization on Kadokawa's ComicWalker website on August 4, 2017. The manga's chapters have been compiled into six tankōbon volumes as of February 2026.

The manga adaptation is licensed in English by Yen Press.

No.	Original release date	Original ISBN	North American release date	North American ISBN
1	April 5, 2018	978-4-04-069834-2	November 17, 2020	978-1-9753-1748-5
2	February 5, 2019	978-4-04-065489-8	February 23, 2021	978-1-9753-1761-4
3	October 4, 2019	978-4-04-064025-9	June 1, 2021	978-1-9753-1763-8
4	August 5, 2022	978-4-04-064886-6	May 23, 2023	978-1-9753-6925-5
5	February 17, 2025	978-4-04-683641-0	March 24, 2026	979-8-8554-2510-9
6	February 16, 2026	978-4-04-685667-8	—	—

== See also ==
- Bride of the Barrier Master, a novel series also written by Kureha
- The Ogre's Bride, another light novel series written by Kureha
- Sugar Apple Fairy Tale, another light novel series illustrated by aki
