= Yuika (singer) =

Japanese singer-songwriter (born 2005)

Yuika 『ユイカ』
- Born: January 12, 2005 (age 21)
- Origin: Nara Prefecture
- Genre: J-Pop
- Occupation: Singer-songwriter
- Instruments: Vocal, guitar
- Years active: 2020–present
- Label: Virgin Music
- Website: yuika-official.jp

TikTok information
- Page: 『ユイカ』
- Followers: 394.9 thousand

YouTube information
- Channel: 『ユイカ』
- Subscribers: 1 million
- Views: 524.15 million
- Last updated: June 12, 2026

Yuika (Japanese: 『ユイカ』; born January 12, 2005) is a Japanese singer-songwriter. Originally from Nara Prefecture, she began uploading cover of songs from various artists like Mrs. Green Apple on TikTok. She became popular on TikTok after she released her debut single, "Sukidakara" in June 2021 during her first year in high school.

She debuted with Universal Music Japan in June 2024, at the same time releasing her first album Longing for Navy Blue. She revealed her face to the public in February 2025 following her 20th birthday. She charted on Billboard Japan's Artist 100 chart in June 2026.

== Biography ==
Yuika was born on January 12, 2005. Her parents are pharmacist. She is from Nara Prefecture but later moved to Tokyo.

Yuika first stated in an interview with Usen Corporation that ever since she was in kindergarten, she dreamt of being a singer and stated that she taught herself to write music. She started uploading various covers of songs from other artists, such as Kenshi Yonezu and Mrs. Green Apple, on TikTok when she was in her second year of middle school.

Yuika debuted with the single "Sukidakara" on June 27, 2021, while she was in her first year in high school. The song became a huge hit on TikTok and was popular in both Japan and South East Asia.

She stated in an interview with Usen Corporation that when she released the song, her TikTok username was set to "Kelvin is 273 added to it" (ケルビンは273を足せ, Kerubin wa 273 o Tase) because she forgot to add 273 when converting Celsius to Kelvin during a test. After the song became popular, she changed it to her current username. Her TikTok username was written in katakana and includes a corner bracket quotation mark, and she said that she chose the username to avoid confusion with other people named Yuika. According to her, she chose to use her real name because when "she write lyrics about what she was thinking, so she does not want to lie."

Yuika released the song "Seventeen's Song" in May 2022. In an interview with Real Sound, she said that the song was inspired by her conflict with music. She said that she initially wanted to pursue medicine, particularly the Faculty of Pharmacy upon graduating high school, because her parents were pushing her towards it, but decided to pursue a music-related course once her parents gave their approval after she played "Seventeen's Song" to them.

Yuika sang the ending theme for the 2023 anime series Blue Orchestra. She debuted with the music label Universal Music Japan on June 14, 2024, with the release of her first album Longing for Navy Blue. She sang the first ending theme song of the 2024 anime series A Terrified Teacher at Ghoul School!. Before turning 20 years old, she released another single entitled "Last Teenage Days" which focuses on how she felt about the end of her teenage years. She revealed her face to the public for the first time upon the announcement of her song "Medicine" and announced a live tour in February 2025. In February 2025, it was announced that Yuika's songs will have a manga adaptation by Nijisawa Hanami; the first issue will feature her songs "Sukidakara", "The one" and "Sniper". She perform the opening theme for the 2025 anime Watari-kun's ****** Is About to Collapse. In November 2025, she was diagnosed with acute hepatitis and was hospitalized for a few days.

In 2026, Yuika performed the ending theme song for the second season of the anime Tis Time for "Torture," Princess. She performed the ending theme of the anime Pardon the Intrusion, I'm Home!. On June 17, she ranked 98th on Billboard Japan's weekly Artist 100 chart.

== Artistry ==
She often writes love songs with the theme of "unrequited love". In an interview with Real Sound, she said that she makes songs that are different from her own taste – adding that she likes Yorushika and Ami Sakaguchi's expression of negative emotions, while she often writes in a more positive tone and makes sure that the songs she writes have a "positive ending". She usually sings while playing her guitar. Aone Komachi from Billboard Japan described her songs as "a mix of familiarity that is common to traditional J-POP, but it is not just nostalgic, but rather has more elements that make it feel new than nostalgic."

== Personal life ==
Yuika revealed in a speech during one of her concert that she was born with almost no left eye due to amblyopia and having a hard time seeing in her left eye because of it.

== Discography ==
=== Albums ===
Title	Release date	Peak ranking
Title	Release date	JPN CD
Longing for Navy Blue	June 14, 2024	32

=== EPs ===
Title	Release date	Peak ranking
Title	Release date	JP Hot
Dear Emerald	August 21, 2026	—

=== Singles ===
Title	Release date	Peak ranking	Album
Title	Release date	JPN Hot	Album
"Sukidakara"	June 27, 2021	—	Longing for Navy Blue
"Subaniite"	October 1, 2021	—	Longing for Navy Blue
"Koidorobou"	March 27, 2022	—	Longing for Navy Blue
"Anone" (Note: Along with Arekun)	April 29, 2022	—	Non-album single
"Seventeen's Song"	May 29, 2022	—	Non-album single
"Prologue"	March 1, 2023	—	Non-album single
"The One"	October 27, 2023	—	Longing for Navy Blue
"Snow Globe"	November 24, 2023	—	Longing for Navy Blue
"Feels Like I'm in Love"	February 6, 2024	—	Longing for Navy Blue
"Sniper"	April 19, 2024	—	Longing for Navy Blue
"The Song About You That You Don't Know"	June 28, 2024	—	Non-album single
"Who I Am" (Note: Ending theme of the anime series A Terrified Teacher at Ghoul School!)	October 9, 2024	—	Non-album single
"It Doesn't Have to Be Christmas Day"	December 6, 2024	—	Non-album single
"Last Teenage Days"	January 8, 2025	—	Non-album single
"Medicine"	February 5, 2025	—	Non-album single
"Devoted Girl"	April 30, 2025	—	Non-album single
"Don't Look Up the Flower Language"	June 25, 2025	—	Non-album single
"I Want to Be Your Ghost" (Note: Opening theme of the 2025 anime series Watari-kun's ****** Is About to Collapse)	July 25, 2025	—	Non-album single
"What I Chose"	December 19, 2025	—	Non-album single
"I Can't Be a Princess" (Note: Ending theme song of the second season of the anime series Tis Time for "Torture," Princess.)	February 6, 2026	— (Note: "I Can't Be a Princess" did not enter the Billboard Japan Hot 100, but peaked at number 98 on the Billboard Japan Download Songs chart.)	Non-album single
"Triangle Game" (Note: Ending theme of the 2026 anime Pardon the Intrusion, I'm Home!)	April 8, 2026	—	Non-album single
"Invisible Youth"	June 8, 2026	31	Non-album single
"Kawaikunai" (Note: Ending theme of the third season of anime Ranma ½ (2024).)	October 9, 2026	—	Non-album single
"Nanimono demo nakatta Watashi dakara" (Note: Opening theme of the upcoming anime Promise Me the Spotlight.)	TBA	TBA	Non-album single
