= Koigakubo-kun Stole My First Time =

Japanese manga series

- First tankōbon volume cover

恋ヶ窪くんにはじめてを奪われました (Koigakubo-kun ni Hajimete o Ubawaremashita)
- Genre: Romantic comedy
- Manga
- Written by: Rin Miasa
- Published by: Kodansha
- English publisher: NA: Kodansha USA
- Imprint: KC Deluxe
- Magazine: Palcy
- Original run: March 30, 2021 – present
- Volumes: 10

Koigakubo-kun Stole My First Time (恋ヶ窪くんにはじめてを奪われました, Koigakubo-kun ni Hajimete o Ubawaremashita) is a Japanese manga series written and illustrated by Rin Miasa. It began serialization on Kodansha's Pixiv-based Palcy website and app in March 2021.

== Plot ==
Eiko Kagehara is a 29-year old introverted woman who has devoted herself to MMO gaming and is inexperienced with romance. She later meets Aren Koigakubo, a younger man who is considered handsome and successful. After a drunk encounter between the two, Koigakubo offers to teach Eiko about romance.

== Publication ==
Written and illustrated by Rin Miasa, Koigakubo-kun Stole My First Time began serialization on Kodansha's Pixiv-based Palcy website and app on March 30, 2021. Its chapters have been collected into ten tankōbon volumes as of June 2026. The series is licensed digitally in North America by Kodansha USA.

No.	Original release date	Original ISBN	North American release date	North American ISBN
1	September 13, 2021	978-4-06-524861-4	May 24, 2022	978-1-68-491198-1
1. "First Kiss"; 2. "Teach Me, Please"; 3. "An Approaching Sigh"; 4. "Her First XXX"
2	January 13, 2022	978-4-06-526522-2	June 28, 2022	978-1-68-491239-1
5. "I Love You For Real"; 6. "A Profession of Love... And What Comes Next"; 7. "The Feelings I Want to Convey"; 8. "Our First Night"
3	June 13, 2022	978-4-06-528091-1	October 25, 2022	978-1-68-491508-8
9. "House Dates & Girlfriend Specs"; 10. "A Romantic Getaway"; 11. "A Real Relationship"; 12. "Her First Step as a Girlfriend"
4	November 11, 2022	978-4-06-529765-0	April 25, 2023	978-1-68-491899-7
13. "First Get-Well-Soon Visit"; 14. "A Fretful Couple"; 15. "Words Unsaid, Words Misread"; 16. "My First Time with You"; Bonus
5	March 13, 2023	978-4-06-531025-0	August 22, 2023	979-8-88-933105-6
17. "Koigakubo-kun's Birthday"; 18. "Present for a Lover"; 19. "First Snow Trip with His Friends"; 20. "First Feelings of Possessiveness"
6	September 13, 2023	978-4-06-532976-4	February 27, 2024	979-8-88-933380-7
21. "Visiting His Parents' House"; 22. "Birthday with the Boyfriend"; 23. "Don't Look at Other Guys"; 24. "Koigakubo-kun's Selfishness"
7	March 13, 2024	978-4-06-534973-1	August 27, 2024	979-8-88-933700-3
25. "Meeting Her Parents"; 26. "The High Stakes Shrine Visit"; 27. "My Best Friend's Wedding"; 28. "The Future at My Doorstep"; Bonus
8	November 13, 2024	978-4-06-537233-3	April 15, 2025	979-8-89-478510-3
29. "A Step Towards the Future"; 30. "First Time Moving in Together"; 31. "Ins and Outs of Sharing a House"; 32. "First Meeting with His Coworker"; Bonus
9	August 12, 2025	978-4-06-540412-6	January 13, 2026	979-8-89-478839-5
33. "Dreams I Won't Give Up On"; 34. "Emotional Unrest"; 35. "Someone I Want to Protect"; 36. "Decisions About the Future"
10	June 12, 2026	978-4-06-543874-9	—	—

== Reception ==
The series, alongside Bride of the Barrier Master, won the Women's Comic Prize at the 2024 Electronic Manga Award held by NTT Solmare.
