= Onmyo Kaiten Re:Birth Verse =

Japanese anime television series

- Key visual

陰陽廻天 Re:バース (Onmyō Kaiten Re:Bāsu)
- Genre: Isekai; Yankī
- Created by: Fujiko Sakuno (story); Hideya Takahashi (concept); Akutō Satō (plot concept)
- Manga
- Written by: Fujiko Sakuno
- Illustrated by: Kyūjo Matsumoto
- Published by: Kodansha
- Imprint: Morning KC
- Magazine: Morning Two
- Original run: February 6, 2025 – present
- Volumes: 1
- Anime television series
- Directed by: Hideya Takahashi
- Written by: Hayashi Mori
- Music by: Masahiro Tokuda
- Studio: David Production
- Licensed by: Crunchyroll; SA/SEA: Medialink
- Original network: Fuji TV (+Ultra)
- Original run: July 3, 2025 – September 18, 2025
- Episodes: 12
- icon

Onmyo Kaiten Re:Birth Verse (Japanese: 陰陽廻天 Re:バース, Hepburn: Onmyō Kaiten Re:Bāsu) is an original Japanese anime television series created by Fujiko Sakuno, Hideya Takahashi, and Akutō Satō and animated by David Production. The series aired from July to September 2025. A manga adaptation written by Sakuno and illustrated by Kyūjo Matsumoto began serialization on Kodansha's Morning Two manga website in February 2025.

== Plot ==
Takeru Narihira, a high school delinquent, is constantly haunted by dreams of a mysterious girl named Tsukimiya. After a fatal accident in his world, Takeru plunges off a cliff and awakens in Denji Heian-kyo, a parallel dimension that fuses ancient Japanese Heian aesthetics with futuristic technology. Both Takeru and Tsukimiya are killed. Upon dying, Takeru realizes he possesses a unique temporal ability: dying resets the clock, sending him back to the moment he arrived in Denji Heian-kyo. Determined to alter fate and keep Tsukimiya alive, Takeru trains under the legendary sorcerer Abe no Seimei. He learns to harness specialized onmyoutjutsu (mystical magic) and pilot giant spirit constructs called shikigami to battle the invading forces. As Takeru endures repeated deaths and resets, he uncovers the dark secret behind Denji Heian-kyo, the origin of the Oni, and Seimei’s grand plan known as the "World Whittle".

== Characters ==
Takeru Narihira (業平猛, Narihira Takeru)
Voiced by: Taihi Kimura (Japanese); Ethan Connor Condon (English)
Tsukimiya (ツキミヤ)
Voiced by: Maaya Uchida (Japanese); Trisha Mellon (English)
Abe no Seimei (安倍晴明)
Voiced by: Ryōhei Kimura (Japanese); Jordan Dash Cruz (English)
Atsunaga (アツナガ)
Voiced by: Kaito Ishikawa (Japanese); Aaron Campbell (English)
A top-class elite onmyoji with exceptional skills and achievements. A diligent individual who never skips daily training, though his overly serious and rigid personality can be a slight flaw. Alongside the brawler Yura, he summons shikigami and fights by making full use of their respective strengths.
Yura (ユラ)
Voiced by: Anna Nagase (Japanese); Ezra Vervin (English)
An onmyoji whose high combat ability earned Atsunaga's recognition as his partner. She has a rough and blunt way of speaking and acting, and mainly fights using kicking techniques. Though not very sociable, she's pure-hearted and wears her emotions on her face.
Kazura (カズラ)
Voiced by: Marina Inoue (Japanese); Ciaran Strange (English)
Despite his young age, his exceptional talent earned him a direct position under Abe no Seimei. Although his combat abilities are average, he serves as a field commander for the combat unit, utilizing his extensive knowledge and sharp analytical skills. He is the younger twin brother of Shino, but unlike his sister, he is calm, composed, and nothing like her in demeanor.
Shino (シノ)
Voiced by: Chihaya Yoshitake (Japanese); Kayla Temshiv (English)
The laid-back older twin sister of the serious Kazura. Like her brother, she serves directly under Abe no Seimei and is known as one half of the genius onmyoji sibling duo. Though her carefree attitude and casual speech paint a relaxed image, she occasionally surprises others with sharp, insightful remarks.

== Media ==
=== Manga ===
A manga adaptation written by Fujiko Sakuno and illustrated by Kyūjo Matsumoto began serialization on Kodansha's Morning Two manga website on February 6, 2025. A single tankōbon volume has been released as of June 2025.

No.	Release date	ISBN
1	June 23, 2025	978-4-06-539829-6
2	November 22, 2027	978-4-06-540808-7

=== Anime ===
The original anime television series produced by David Production was announced on March 6, 2025. It is directed by Hideya Takahashi with series composition by Hayashi Mori, Kazuaki Morita designing the characters and Masahiro Tokuda composing the music. The series aired from July 3 to September 18, 2025, on Fuji TV's +Ultra programming block. (Note: Fuji TV lists the series premiere on July 2, 2025, at 24:45, which is effectively July 3 at 12:45 a.m. JST.) The opening theme song is "Cry Out Cry Over!", performed by Who-ya Extended, while the ending theme song is, "Turn Over" performed by 9Lana. Crunchyroll is streaming the series. Medialink licensed the series in South and Southeast Asia for streaming on Ani-One Asia's YouTube channel.

==== Episodes ====
No.	Title	Directed by (Note: Production staff information is taken from the ending credits of each episode.)	Written by	Storyboarded by	Original release date
1	"Don't Admit Defeat Even If You're Dead! A Delinquent in Denji Heian-kyo!"; Transliteration: "Shinde mo Make o Mitomenna! Yankī, Denji Heian-kyō ni Tatsu!" (Japanese: 死んでも負けを認めんな！ヤンキー、電祇平安京に立つ！)	Hideya Takahashi	Hayashi Mori	Hideya Takahashi & Yūsuke Kubo	July 3, 2025 (Note: This episode aired at 12:55 a.m. JST, 10 minutes after the original air time on Fuji TV.)
2	"You Can't Build Trust with Words! This Delinquent Will Be an Onmyoji"; Transliteration: "Shinrai tte no Wa Kotoba ja Tsukurenē! Yankī, Inyōshi ni Naru" (Japanese: 信頼ってのは言葉じゃ作れねえ！ヤンキー、陰陽師になる)	Kiyomitsu Sato	Hayashi Mori	Yūsuke Kubo	July 10, 2025 (Note: This episode aired at 1:00 a.m. JST, 15 minutes after the original air time on Fuji TV.)
3	"Don't Just Focus on What You Can See! Yura's Wavering Feelings"; Transliteration: "Mieru Mon bakkari Miru na! Yura, Yureruomoi" (Japanese: 見えるモンばっかり見るな！ユラ、揺れる想い)	Yuki Morita	Shogo Yasukawa	Takahiro Kamei	July 17, 2025 (Note: This episode aired at 1:05 a.m. JST, 20 minutes after the original air time on Fuji TV.)
4	"Don't Get Used to Being Alone! Takeru's First Centennial Pandemonium!"; Transliteration: "Hitori ni Nareruna! Takeru, Hajimete no Hyakunen Yakō" (Japanese: ひとりに慣れるな！タケル、初めての百年夜行)	Fumio Maezono	Hayashi Mori	Yūsuke Kubo	July 24, 2025
5	"Come On Down, Once-in-a-Millennium Me! The Yasha Mask That Guides Takeru"; Transliteration: "Chitose ni Hitori no Ore, Orite Koi! Takeru o Michibiku Yasha no Men" (Japanese: 千年に一人の俺、降りてこい！タケルを導く夜叉の面)	Sumio Watanabe	Shogo Yasukawa	Yumeko Iwaoka	July 31, 2025
6	"This Time I'll Protect You! What Appeared beyond the Centennial Pandemonium"; Transliteration: "Kondo wa Mamoru! Hyaku-nen Yakō no Saki ni Mieta Mono" (Japanese: 今度は守る！百年夜行の先に見えたもの)	Kiyomitsu Sato	Hayashi Mori	Takahiro Kamei	August 7, 2025
7	"Say It Ain't So! The Truth about Denji Heian-kyo Is Revealed"; Transliteration: "Usoda to Itte Kure! Akasa Reru-den Denji Heian-kyō no Shinjitsu" (Japanese: 嘘だと言ってくれ！明かされる電祇平安京の真実)	Yuki Morita	Hayashi Mori	Hiroaki Yoshikawa	August 14, 2025
8	"Don't Screw Around with People Desperately Trying to Get By! The Wailing of Seiryu Tower"; Transliteration: "Hisshi ni Iki Teru Yatsu o Baka ni Sunja nē! Dōkoku no Seiryū-tō" (Japanese: 必死に生きてる奴を馬鹿にすんじゃねぇ！慟哭(どうこく)の青龍塔)	Fumio Maezono	Shogo Yasukawa	Hiroaki Yoshikawa & Yūsuke Kubo	August 21, 2025
9	"Fight Me for Real! Takeru vs. Seimei, Souls Going Mano a Mano"; Transliteration: "Honki de Naguri ae! Takeru VS Seimei, Tamashī no Taiman!!" (Japanese: 本気で殴り合え！タケルVS晴明、魂のタイマン!!)	Masanori Mine & Tetsuji Nakamura	Hayashi Mori	Takahiro Kamei	August 28, 2025
10	"Change the Future on Your Own! Seimei, across a Thousand Years"; Transliteration: "Temē wa Temē de Mirai o Kaero! Hareaki, Sennen no Toki no Kanata de" (Japanese: テメーはテメーで未来を変えろ！晴明、千年の時の彼方で)	Sumio Watanabe	Shogo Yasukawa	Hideya Takahashi & Sumio Watanabe	September 4, 2025
11	"Get Ready, Hareaki! Final Showdown in Denji Heian-kyo!!"; Transliteration: "Kakugo o Kimero Hareaki! Denji Heian-kyō, Saishū Kessen!!" (Japanese: 覚悟を決めろハレアキ！電祇平安京、最終決戦!!)	Yuki Morita & Yukio Kuroda	Hayashi Mori	Hiroaki Yoshikawa	September 11, 2025
12	"Don't Give Up on the Future! I'll Seize the Possibility I've Long Desired"; Transliteration: "Mirai o Akiramen na! Nozomi Tsudzuketa Kanōsei o Kono-te ni" (Japanese: 未来を諦めんな！望み続けた可能性をこの手に)	Hideya Takahashi & Yuki Morita	Hayashi Mori	Hideya Takahashi	September 18, 2025
