= Taihi Kimura =

Japanese voice actor

- 木村 太飛
- Born: 15 March
- Occupation: Voice actor
- Employer: Ken Production
- Notable work: Onmyo Kaiten Re:Birth Verse as Takeru Narihira; Liar Game as Shingo Fujita; Nippon Sangoku as Fuji III
- Awards: Seiyu Awards Best New Actor Award (2026)

Taihi Kimura (Japanese: 木村 太飛, Hepburn: Kimura Taihi; born 15 March) is a Japanese voice actor affiliated with Ken Production. He starred as Takeru Narihira in the 2025 anime Onmyo Kaiten Re:Birth Verse and won the Best New Actor Award at the 20th Seiyu Awards in 2026.

== Biography ==
Taihi Kimura, a native of Aomori, was born on 15 March. While attending Hokuto High School, he received an Excellence Award in the recitation category of the 64th NHK Cup National High School Broadcasting Contest and served as the master of ceremonies for the closing ceremony of the 2018 Japanese High School Baseball Invitational Tournament. Around this time, he first developed an interest in pursuing voice acting as a profession while performing recitations as a member of his school's broadcasting club. Subsequently, he discovered an open audition online and decided to participate, a decision he recalled was "done on a sudden impulse". This marked the beginning of his career as a voice actor, and he became part of Ken Production, which was one of the audition's co-organizers.

In March 2025, Kimura was cast as Takeru Narihira, the main character of Onmyo Kaiten Re:Birth Verse; he was selected by Anime! Anime! as one of the summer 2025 anime season's new voice actors for his role in Onmyo Kaiten Re:Birth Verse. He also voiced Adam Krensh in The Beginning After the End and Takumi Sumino The Hundred Line: Last Defense Academy. He starred as Shingo Fujita in Liar Game and Fuji III in Nippon Sangoku. In 2026, he won the Best New Actor Award at the 20th Seiyu Awards.

In a 2025 interview with Walkerplus, Kimura found working on anime or audio dramas set in all-boys' school environments particularly enjoyable, as the atmosphere during gaya recording sessions tends to be lively. He also has a strong fondness for playing yankee characters.

Kimura can speak the Tsugaru dialect – which Anime! Anime! described as a "special skill that could be utilized in his work" – and is also a collector of vintage clothing.

== Filmography ==
=== Television animation ===
Year	Title	Role	Ref
2025	Flower and Asura	Rengo Nishino	
2025	Onmyo Kaiten Re:Birth Verse	Takeru Narihira	
2025	The Beginning After the End	Adam Krensh	
2026	Nippon Sangoku	Fuji III	
2026	Liar Game	Shingo Fujita	
2026	The Vermilion Mask	Peru d'Arrest	
2026	Beyblade X	One Kurosu	
2027	Bride of the Barrier Master	Aoi	
2027	Kagurabachi	Chihiro Rokuhira	
TBA	Millennium Family	Noel	
TBA	Promise Me the Spotlight	Koichi Obuta	

=== Animated film ===
Year	Title	Role	Ref
2026	Mobile Suit Gundam Hathaway: The Sorcery of Nymph Circe	Drab Liddo	

=== Video games ===
Year	Title	Role	Ref
2025	The Hundred Line: Last Defense Academy	Takumi Sumino	
