= Promise Me the Spotlight =

Japanese manga series

- First tankōbon volume cover

私をセンターにすると誓いますか？ (Watashi o Sentā ni Suru to Chikaimasuka?)
- Genre: Romantic comedy
- Manga
- Written by: Jun Wakatsuki
- Published by: Kodansha
- English publisher: Kodansha (digital)
- Imprint: Sirius KC
- Magazine: Shōnen Magazine Edge (November 17, 2022 – October 17, 2023); Magazine Pocket (February 3, 2024 – present)
- Original run: November 17, 2022 – present
- Volumes: 6
- Anime television series
- Directed by: Seiji Kishi
- Written by: Yūko Kakihara
- Studio: Team TillDawn
- Original network: TXN (TV Tokyo)
- icon

Promise Me the Spotlight (Japanese: 私をセンターにすると誓いますか？, Hepburn: Watashi o Sentā ni Suru to Chikaimasuka?) is a Japanese manga series written and illustrated by Jun Wakatsuki. It was originally serialized in Kodansha's Shōnen Magazine Edge from November 2022 to October 2023, before transferring to their Magazine Pocket service in February 2024. The series has been compiled into six volumes as of July 2026. An anime television series adaptation produced by Team TillDawn has been announced.

== Plot ==
Koichi Okuta is a huge fan of the nationally popular idol group Melty Strawberry, particularly its member Mizuki Natsuno. However, Mizuki is the group's least popular member, with rumors recently emerging that she will soon be leaving the group. One day, Koichi wakes up to discover Mizuki is now his stepsister, his father having remarried. With Mizuki discouraged about her idol career and Koichi being her only fan, Koichi vows to help her become the center of Melty Strawberry and boost her popularity, while Mizuki promises to marry him if he can fulfill his promise.

== Characters ==
Koichi Okuta (奥田 幸一, Okuta Kōichi)
Voiced by: Taihi Kimura
A high school student and a fan of Melty Strawberry. He got into idols after his mother's death, quickly falling in love with the idol Mizuki Natsuno. After his father remarries, he becomes Mizuki's stepbrother, with the two now living together. He previously proposed to her during a meet-and-greet session with her, with Mizuki promising to accept his feelings if he helped her become the group's center.
Mizuki Natsuno (夏野 瑞希, Natsuno Mizuki)
Voiced by: Haruna Mikawa
Nicknamed Zukki (ずっきー, Zukkī), she is a member of the idol group Melty Strawberry. Despite having been a member of the group for years, she is by far its least popular member, with most fans being turned off by her cold personality. Due to her lack of popularity, she has been considering ending her idol career, but changes her mind with Koichi's help.
Awayuki Shiroi (白井 淡雪, Shiroi Awayuki)
Voiced by: Mai Kanno
A member of Melty Strawberry. Because of her being the most popular member, she often serves as the center for the group, gaining the nickname "Eternal Center".
Hatsune Fukuba (福羽 初音, Fukuba Hatsune)
Voiced by: Yukari Anzai
A member of Melty Strawberry.
Saku Kageyama (影山 咲, Kageyama Saku)
A member of Melty Strawberry.
Niko Okamoto (岡本 笑心, Okamoto Niko)
A member of Melty Strawberry.
Mirin Sato (佐藤 美鈴, Satō Mirin)
A member of Melty Strawberry.
Mio Shiomi (潮見 美緒, Shiomi Mio)
A member of Melty Strawberry.
Minori Mochizuki (望月 実, Mochizuki Minori)
A member of Melty Strawberry.
Lala Hoshino (星野 ララ, Hoshino Rara)
A member of Melty Strawberry.
Ema Asuka (飛鳥 エマ, Asuka Ema)
A member of Melty Strawberry.
Mai Minō (美濃 麻衣, Minō Mai)
A member of Melty Strawberry.
Shinju Himeno (姫野 真珠, Himeno Shinju)
A member of Melty Strawberry.
Kaoru Amasaga (天清 薫, Amasaga Kaoru)
A member of Melty Strawberry.

== Media ==
=== Manga ===
The series is written and illustrated by written and illustrated by Jun Wakatsuki, who originally began serializing it in Kodansha's Shōnen Magazine Edge on November 17, 2022. Following the magazine's discontinuation in October 2023, the series transferred to Kodansha's online service Magazine Pocket on February 3, 2024. The first tankōbon volume was released on July 7, 2023; five volumes have been released as of July 9, 2026. The series is also released in English on Kodansha's K Manga web service.

No.	Release date	ISBN
1	July 7, 2023	978-4-06-532045-7
2	November 9, 2023	978-4-06-533690-8
3	July 9, 2024	978-4-06-536052-1
4	April 9, 2025	978-4-06-539183-9
5	September 9, 2025	978-4-06-540704-2
6	July 9, 2026	978-4-06-543956-2

=== Anime ===
An anime television series adaptation was announced on July 8, 2026. The series will be produced by Team TillDawn and directed by Seiji Kishi, with Yūko Kakihara handling series composition and Kazuaki Morita designing the characters. It is set to air on TV Tokyo and its affiliates. The opening theme song is "Nanimono demo nakatta Watashi dakara" (何者でもなかった私だから, 'Because I Was No One'), performed by Yuika.
