= Bride of the Barrier Master =

Japanese novel series

- First novel volume cover featuring Saku Ichinomiya (left) and Hana Ichise (right)

結界師の一輪華 (Kekkaishi no Ichirinka)
- Genre: Romantic fantasy
- Novel series
- Written by: Kureha
- Illustrated by: Bodax
- Published by: Kadokawa Shoten
- English publisher: NA: Yen Press
- Imprint: Kadokawa Bunko
- Original run: December 21, 2021 – present
- Volumes: 7
- Manga
- Written by: Kureha
- Illustrated by: Odayaka
- Published by: Enterbrain
- English publisher: NA: Yen Press
- Imprint: B's Log Comics
- Magazine: B's Log Comic
- Original run: March 5, 2022 – present
- Volumes: 8
- Anime television series
- Directed by: Tōru Kitahata
- Written by: Yūko Kakihara
- Music by: Yukari Hashimoto; Ruka Kawada; R.O.N
- Studio: Troyca
- Licensed by: Netflix (streaming rights)
- Original network: Tokyo MX, BS NTV, SUN, KBS Kyoto, TVh, TVQ, SBS, TV Ehime, tbc, RCC
- Original run: January 6, 2027 – scheduled
- icon

Bride of the Barrier Master (Japanese: 結界師の一輪華, Hepburn: Kekkaishi no Ichirinka) is a Japanese novel series written by Kureha with illustrations by Bodax. It began publication under Kadokawa Shoten's Kadokawa Bunko novel imprint in December 2021. A manga adaptation illustrated by Odayaka began serialization in Enterbrain's B's Log Comic online magazine in March 2022. An anime television series adaptation produced by Troyca is set to premiere in January 2027.

== Plot ==
Since time immemorial, Japan has been upheld by five magical crystal pillars that are protected from monster called a "youma" by barriers supported by five powerful clans of magic practitioners. Hana Ichise was born into a branch family of one of the five clans, but has been dismissed and cast aside as weak by her parents, who favour her talented older twin sister, Hazuki. On her fifteenth birthday, a great power suddenly awakens in Hana, but she decides to conceal her newfound abilities in order to some day live a quiet and freedom life.

Three years later, Saku Ichinomiya, the new head of the Ichinomiya family, seeks a woman with the power to cast a barrier around one of the five pillars, and sets his sights on Hana, who he discovers has true talent. Hana reluctantly accepts a contract marriage with Saku, on the condition that she will receive 1 billion yen and a house in the countryside if she fulfills the terms of the contract. However, as she begins to develop sincere feelings for Saku and becomes embroiled in the conflicts between the magicians, her dreams of a peaceful future begin to crumble.

== Characters ==
Hana Ichise (一瀬華, Ichise Hana)
Voiced by: Saori Ōnishi (PV), Akari Kitō (anime)
The protagonist. Initially dismissed as weak, Hana mysteriously gains exceptional new powers on her fifteenth birthday, but conceals them in order to live a free and quiet life. She is convinced to enter a contractual marriage with Saku when he discovers her true power, with the terms being 1 billion yen, a house and an area of land to her liking, and guaranteed employment at the Ichinomiya group after her graduation. Because of the years of neglect, Hana grew rather clinical, however, because of the help of a servant, Sae, she didn't fall into emotional disparity. As an exceptional powerful sorcerer, she commands multiple shikigami: a butterfly named "Azuha," a samurai named "Aoi," a celestial maiden named "Miyabi," and a dog spirit named "Arashi."
Saku Ichinomiya (一ノ宮朔, Ichinomiya Saku)
Voiced by: Yuma Uchida (PV), Kikunosuke Toya (anime)
The head of Ichinomiya clan. After seeing Hana's true strength, he enters into a contractual marriage with her as he needs a powerful wife to maintain the barrier around one of the crystal pillars protecting Japan. However, he falls in love with Hana and refuses to accept the promise to divorce her after the contract is fulfilled. Despite his proud and arrogant personality, he has the appropriate strength befitting a clan leader. He is the youngest sorcerer to attain the highest rank, Jet Black (漆黒, Shikkoku). His primary shikigami is Tsubaki, a humanoid that fell in love with Hana's samurai shikigami Aoi.
Hazuki Ichise (一瀬葉月, Ichise Hazuki)
Voiced by: Kanon Takao
Hana's twin older sister. Her parents have high expectations of Hazuki, much to her chagrin. Although she was considered a strong candidate to be Saku's bride by those around her, Saku saw her as lacking in strength and did not choose her as his bride.
Yanagi Ichise (一瀬 柳, Ichise Yanagi)
Voiced by: Chiaki Kobayashi
Hazuki and Hana's 28 year old elder brother. He is a highly skilled sorcerer, holding the rank of Ruri (瑠璃). Despite his abilities, he is socially awkward, which led to Hazuki and Hana assuming that he doesn't care for them, when he actually does. Despite being appointed as the head of the family by his grandfather, Yanagi was abused by his father. Despite knowing about Hana's powers, he kept them secret out of fear for her personal autonomy.
Hazuki and Hana's father
An unnamed man, he is extremely ambitious. He usurped the position of Head of the Family from his son Yanagi, who was named heir. He is abusive towards Hana also having abused his son. He often feels inferior to his son, who is stronger than him.
Sae (紗江, Sae)
The elderly maid who looked after Hana and Hazuki. She became Hana's primary caretaker due to the neglect from her parents.
Mio Ichinomiya (一ノ宮美桜, Ichinomiya Mio)
Saku and nozomu's mother.She had opposed the marriage between Saku and Hana, but he changed her mind after witnessing Hana's true power during her duel with Nozomu.
Nozomu Ichinomiya (一ノ宮望, Ichinomiya Nozomu)
Voiced by: Hiroto Shimizu
Saku's younger brother and Hazuki's classmate. He commands a hawk-like shikigami named "Guren". Like Mio, he doesn't acknowledge Hana and mocked Azuha, which led to a duel in which he was soundly defeated by Hana.
Azuha (あずは, Azuha)
Voiced by: Yuzuki Tamukai
The butterfly with rainbows wings shikigami that Hana created first.
It normally disguises itself as a Hana's hair ornament.
Aoi (葵)
Voiced by: Taihi Kimura
A shikigami in Samurai form created by Hana.
Miyabi (雅)
Voiced by: M.A.O
Another shikigami in heavenly maiden form created by Hana.
Yukizasa Sankoro (雪笹三ころ)
Voiced by: Takuya Eguchi

== Media ==
=== Novels ===
Written by Kureha with illustrations by Bodax, Bride of the Barrier Master began publication under Kadokawa Shoten's Kadokawa Bunko novel imprint on December 21, 2021. Seven volumes have been released as of June 16, 2026. The light novels are licensed in North America by Yen Press.

No.	Original release date	Original ISBN	North American release date	North American ISBN
1	December 21, 2021	978-4-04-111883-2	January 17, 2023	978-1-9753-6052-8
2	September 21, 2022	978-4-04-112648-6	August 22, 2023	978-1-9753-7033-6
3	May 23, 2023	978-4-04-113681-2	July 23, 2024	978-1-9753-8911-6
4	February 22, 2024	978-4-04-114614-9	July 15, 2025	979-8-8554-1785-2
5	December 24, 2024	978-4-04-115537-0	December 8, 2026	979-8-8554-3036-3
6	August 25, 2025	978-4-04-116529-4	—	—
7	June 16, 2026	978-4-04-117487-6	—	—

=== Manga ===
A manga adaptation illustrated by Odayaka began serialization in Enterbrain's B's Log Comic online magazine on March 5, 2022. The manga's chapters have been collected into eight tankōbon volumes as of July 2026.

During their panel at Anime Expo 2023, Yen Press announced that they licensed the series in North America.

No.	Original release date	Original ISBN	North American release date	North American ISBN
1	September 30, 2022	978-4-04-737200-9	January 23, 2024	978-1-9753-7912-4
2	May 1, 2023	978-4-04-737484-3	June 18, 2024	978-1-9753-9316-8
3	December 28, 2023	978-4-04-737796-7	November 19, 2024	979-8-8554-0777-8
4	May 1, 2024	978-4-04-737988-6	June 24, 2025	979-8-8554-1556-8
5	December 27, 2024	978-4-04-738241-1	January 20, 2026	979-8-8554-2099-9
6	July 1, 2025	978-4-04-738506-1	May 26, 2026	979-8-8554-3328-9
7	December 27, 2025	978-4-04-738743-0	February 23, 2027	979-8-8554-4873-3
8	July 30, 2026	978-4-04-500196-3	—	—

=== Anime ===
An anime television series adaptation was announced on August 19, 2025. The series will be produced by Troyca and directed by Tōru Kitahata, with Yūko Kakihara handling series composition and screenplays, Minami Murayama designing the characters, and Yukari Hashimoto, Ruka Kawada, and R.O.N composing the music. It is set to premiere on January 6, 2027, on Tokyo MX and other networks with a one-hour premiere special. The opening theme song is "Ichirinka" (一輪華), performed by Naniwa Danshi. Netflix will stream the series worldwide.

== Reception ==
In January 2024, Yen Press announced that the novel was one of their top 5 best-selling light novel debuts in 2023.

The manga adaptation, alongside Koigakubo-kun Stole My First Time, won the Women's Comic Prize at NTT Solmare's "Minna ga Erabu!! Denshi Comic Taishō 2024" competition in 2024.

By May 2024, the series had over 1.3 million copies in circulation; it had over 1.7 million copies in circulation by December 2024.

== See also ==
- The Ogre's Bride, a light novel series also written by Kureha
- The White Cat's Revenge as Plotted from the Dragon King's Lap, a light novel series also written by Kureha
