= Yuiko =

- Gender: Female

Origin
- Origin: Japanese
- Meaning: Different meanings depending on the kanji used

Yuiko (written: 結子, 悠衣子 or ゆい子) is a feminine Japanese given name. Notable people with the name include:

- Yuiko Konno (金野 結子; born 1980), Japanese women's footballer
- Yuiko Ōhara (大原 ゆい子; born 1992), Japanese singer
- Yuiko Tatsumi (巽 悠衣子; born 1987), Japanese voice actress

== Fictional characters ==
- Yuiko Kurugaya (来ヶ谷 唯湖), a character in the visual novel Little Busters!
