= Fujii Kaze discography =

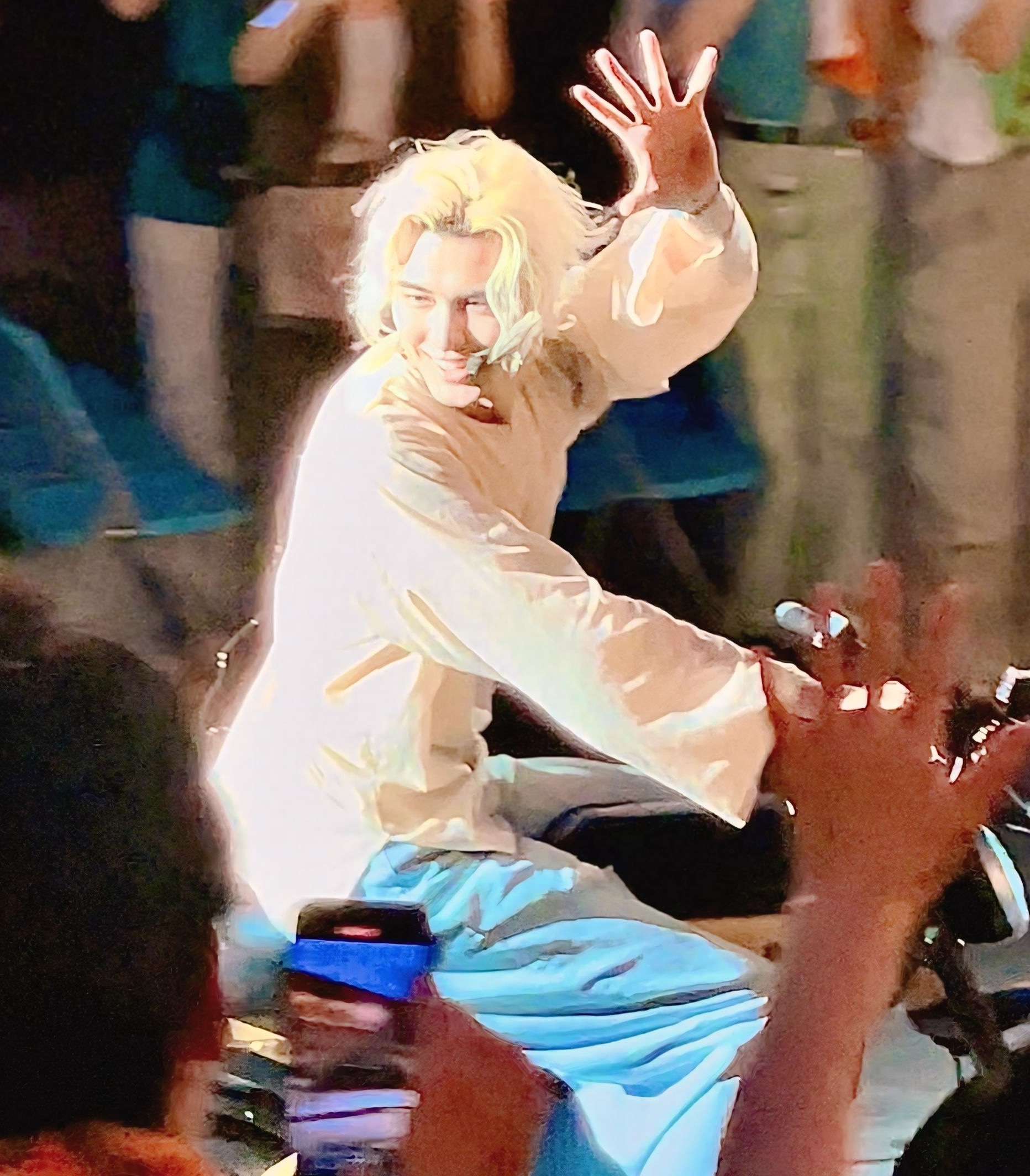
- Fujii in 2024
- Studio albums: 3
- EPs: 5
- Live albums: 1
- Compilation albums: 1
- Singles: 21

The discography of Japanese singer-songwriter Fujii Kaze consists of three studio albums, five extended plays, one live album, one compilation album, and 20 singles. Fujii began his music career on YouTube, where he uploaded covers of various songs. After moving to Tokyo following graduation, he released his debut single "Nan-Nan" in November 2019 and "Mo-Eh-Wah" in December the same year.

Fujii released his debut studio album Help Ever Hurt Never in May 2020, which includes his song "Shinunoga E-Wa", his most-streamed song with over 700 million streams on Spotify. The album peaked at number one on Billboard Japan Hot Albums chart. He also released a cover version of the album called Help Ever Hurt Cover. His second studio album, Love All Serve All, was released in March 2022, and was preceded by the singles "Kirari" and "Matsuri".

Fujii's third studio album, Prema, was released in September 2025, as his first English-language album, and was preceded by the singles "Hana" and "Michiteyuku".

== Albums ==
=== Studio albums ===
List of studio albums, with selected chart positions and certifications
Title	Album details	Peak positions					Sales	Certifications
Title	Album details	JPN	JPN Comb.	JPN Hot	UK Sales	US Sales	Sales	Certifications
Help Ever Hurt Never	Released: May 20, 2020; Label: Universal Sigma, Hehn; Formats: CD, digital download, streaming	2	2	1	—	—	JPN: 134,000	RIAJ: Platinum
Love All Serve All	Released: March 23, 2022; Label: Universal Sigma, Hehn; Formats: CD, digital download, streaming	1	1	1	—	—	JPN: 204,811	RIAJ: Platinum
Prema	Released: September 5, 2025; Label: Republic, Universal Sigma, Hehn; Formats: CD, LP, digital download, streaming	1	1	1	78	14	JPN: 244,842	RIAJ: Platinum
"—" denotes a recording that did not chart or was not released in that territory.

=== Live albums ===
Title	Album details	Peak positions		
Title	Album details	JPN	JPN Comb.	JPN Hot
Fujii Kaze Stadium Live "Feelin' Good"	Released: November 8, 2024; Label: Universal Sigma, Hehn; Formats: CD, digital download, streaming	7	7	12

=== Compilation albums ===
Title	Album details
Best of Fujii Kaze 2020–2024	Released: May 28, 2024; Label: Universal Sigma, Hehn; Formats: Vinyl, digital download, streaming

=== Cover albums ===
Title	Album details	Peak positions			Certifications
Title	Album details	JPN	JPN Comb.	JPN Hot	Certifications
Help Ever Hurt Cover	Released: May 20, 2021; Label: Universal Sigma, Hehn; Formats: CD, digital download, streaming	4	4	4	RIAJ: Gold
Love All Cover All	Released: March 23, 2022; Label: Universal Sigma, Hehn; Formats: CD, digital download, streaming	17	31	10	

== Extended plays ==
Title	EP details	Peak positions		Sales
Title	EP details	JPN Comb.	JPN Hot	Sales
Nan-Nan EP (何なんw EP)	Released: January 24, 2020; Label: Universal Sigma, Hehn; Formats: Digital download, streaming	—	—	
Mo-Eh-Wa EP (もうええわ EP)	Released: February 21, 2020; Label: Universal Sigma, Hehn; Formats: Digital download, streaming	—	10	
Hedemo Ne-Yo EP (へでもねーよ EP)	Released: December 4, 2020; Label: Universal Sigma, Hehn; Formats: Digital download, streaming	27	—	JPN: 5,430
Seishun Sick EP (青春病 EP)	Released: December 11, 2020; Label: Universal Sigma, Hehn; Formats: Digital download, streaming	31	—	JPN: 4,559
Kirari Remixes (Asia Edition)	Released: January 14, 2022; Label: Universal Sigma, Hehn; Formats: Digital download, streaming	15	—	
Pre: Prema	Released: April 3, 2026; Label: Republic, Universal Sigma, Hehn; Formats: Digital download, streaming	—	—	
"—" denotes releases that did not chart or were not released in that region.

== Singles ==
=== As lead artist ===
List of singles, showing selected chart positions, certifications, and associated albums
Title	Year	Peak chart positions					Certifications	Album
Title	Year	JPN Comb.	JPN Hot	PER Ang. Air.	VIE Hot	WW	Certifications	Album
"Nan-Nan" (何なんw)	2019	—	99	—	—	—	RIAJ: Platinum (st.)	Help Ever Hurt Never
"Mo-Eh-Wa" (もうええわ)	2019	—	—	—	—	—		Help Ever Hurt Never
"Yasashisa" (優しさ)	2020	—	34	—	—	—	RIAJ: Platinum (st.)	Help Ever Hurt Never
"Cause It's Endless" (キリがないから)	2020	—	86	—	—	—		Help Ever Hurt Never
"Hedemo Ne-Yo" (へでもねーよ)	2020	—	—	—	—	—		Love All Serve All
"Seishun Sick" (青春病)	2020	—	68	—	—	—	RIAJ: Gold (st.)	Love All Serve All
"Tabiji" (旅路)	2021	15	10	—	—	—	RIAJ: 2× Platinum (st.)	Love All Serve All
"Kirari" (きらり)	2021	5	2	—	—	135	RIAJ: Platinum (dig.); RIAJ: Diamond (st.)	Love All Serve All
"Ignite" (燃えよ)	2021	—	19	—	—	—	RIAJ: Gold (st.)	Love All Serve All
"Matsuri" (まつり)	2022	24	10	—	48	—	RIAJ: Platinum (st.)	Love All Serve All
"Damn"	2022	—	42	—	—	—	RIAJ: Platinum (st.)	Love All Serve All
"Grace"	2022	8	4	—	—	— (Note: "Grace" did not enter the Billboard Global 200, but peaked at number 104 on the Global Excl. US.)	RIAJ: Gold (dig.); RIAJ: Platinum (st.)	Non-album single
"Workin' Hard"	2023	32	13	—	—	—		Non-album single
"Hana" (花)	2023	6	6	—	—	— (Note: "Hana" did not enter the Billboard Global 200, but peaked at number 122 on the Global Excl. US.)	RIAJ: Gold (dig.); RIAJ: 2× Platinum (st.)	Non-album single
"Michiteyuku" (満ちてゆく)	2024	5	4	—	—	139	RIAJ: 2× Platinum (st.)	Non-album single
"Feelin' Go(o)d"	2024	41	19	—	—	—		Non-album single
"Masshiro" (真っ白)	2025	16	11	—	—	— (Note: "Masshiro" did not enter the Billboard Global 200, but peaked at number 180 on the Global Excl. US.)		Non-album single
"Hachikō"	2025	25	9	8	—	—		Prema
"Love Like This"	2025	31	19	—	—	—		Prema
"Prema"	2025	15	5	—	—	—		Prema
"Comets + Gold" (with Elmiene)	2026	—	69	—	—	—		Non-album singles
"You" (featuring Umi)	2026	46	50	—	—	—		Non-album singles
"—" denotes singles that did not chart.

== Other charted and certified songs ==
List of other charted or certified songs, with selected chart positions, certifications and associated albums
Title	Year	Peak chart positions					Certifications	Album
Title	Year	JPN Comb.	JPN Hot	SGP	VIE Hot	WW	Certifications	Album
"Tsumi no Kaori" (罪の香り)	2020	—	—	—	—	—	RIAJ: Gold (st.)	Help Ever Hurt Never
"Shinunoga E-Wa" (死ぬのがいいわ)	2020	33	31	8	39	118	RIAJ: 2× Platinum (st.); RIAA: Gold; RMNZ: Gold	Help Ever Hurt Never
"Sayonara Baby" (さよならべいべ)	2020	—	—	—	—	—	RIAJ: Gold (st.)	Help Ever Hurt Never
"Kaerou" (帰ろう)	2020	—	— (Note: "Kaerou" did not enter the Billboard Japan Hot 100, but peaked at number 48 on the Download Songs.)	—	—	—	RIAJ: Platinum (st.)	Help Ever Hurt Never
"Garden" (ガーデン)	2022	25	26	—	—	—	RIAJ: 2× Platinum (st.)	Love All Serve All
"Casket Girl"	2025	—	40	—	—	—		Prema
"I Need U Back"	2025	—	51	—	—	—		Prema
"It Ain't Over"	2025	—	72	—	—	—		Prema
"You"	2025	—	62	—	—	—		Prema
"Okay, Goodbye"	2025	—	71	—	—	—		Prema
"Forever Young"	2025	—	93	—	—	—		Prema
"My Place"	2026	—	32	—	—	—		2026 World Baseball Classic
"—" denotes singles that did not chart.
