= CD Shop Awards =

Annual music awards presented in Japan

- Sponsored by: All-Japan CD Shop Clerks Union
- Country: Japan
- First award: 2009
- Website: http://www.cdshop-kumiai.jp/

The CD Shop Awards (CDショップ大賞, Shīdī Shoppu Taishō) is an annual set of music awards presented in Japan. It is sponsored by All-Japan CD Shop Employees Union and awarded based on votes by CD shop employees from all over Japan, with the goal of bringing awareness to underappreciated, high quality Japanese records. It is referred to as a "music edition of Japan Booksellers' Award".

== History ==
The CD Shop Awards was started in 2008, inspired by the Japan Booksellers' Award.

The first edition included Grand Prix and Runner-Up awards. Starting from the second edition, regional award and western music award were added. The fourth edition introduced the Newcomer Award, Maestro Award, and Live Performance Award awards. Sixth edition featured new categories, such as Classical Award, Jazz Award, and Enka Award.

In 2019, two categories for the Grand Prix award were added: "red" – overall best record, and "blue" – great record by an up-and-coming artist.

== Voting ==
All CD shop employees (including part-time employees) can vote via online poll, SMS, or fax. In the first round, voters select three albums. After that, top 20 albums make its way into second round. In the end, each voter pick three albums out of top 20 and results are finalized to determine the winner.

== Winners ==
=== Japanese music ===
==== Grand Prix ====
No.	Year	Artist	Title	Ref.
1st	2009	Sōtaisei Riron	Shifon Shugi (シフォン主義)	
2nd	2010	The Bawdies	This Is My Story	
3rd	2011	Andymori	Fanfare to Nekkyō (ファンファーレと熱狂)	
4th	2012	Momoiro Clover Z	Battle and Romance	
5th	2013	Man with a Mission	Mash Up the World	
6th	2014	Maximum the Hormone	Yoshū Fukushū (予襲復讐)	
7th	2015	Babymetal	Babymetal	
8th	2016	Gen Hoshino	Yellow Dancer	
9th	2017	Hikaru Utada	Fantôme	
10th	2018	Yonezu Kenshi	Bootleg	
11th	2019	Gen Hoshino (red)	Pop Virus	
11th	2019	Orisaka Yuta (blue)	Heisei	
12th	2020	Official Hige Dandism (red)	Traveler	
12th	2020	King Gnu (blue)	Sansan	
13th	2021	Yonezu Kenshi (red)	Stray Sheep	
13th	2021	Fujii Kaze (blue)	Help Ever Hurt Never	
14th	2022	Official Hige Dandism (red)	Editorial	
14th	2022	WurtS (blue)	Once Upon A Revival	
15th	2023	Fujii Kaze (red)	Love All Serve All	
15th	2023	Hitsujibungaku (blue)	Our Hope	
16th	2024	Mrs. Green Apple (red)	Antenna	
16th	2024	Atarashii Gakko! (blue)	Maningen (マ人間)	
17th	2025	Satoko Shibata (red)	Your Favorite Things	
17th	2025	Rikon Densetsu (blue)	Rikon Densetsu (離婚伝説)	

==== Runner-up ====
No.	Year	Artist	Title
1st	2009	Ohashi Trio	This Is Music
1st	2009	Perfume	Game
2nd	2010	Ryujin Kiyoshi	Philosophy
2nd	2010	Superfly	Box Emotions
3rd	2011	Shinsei Kamattechan	Tomodachi o Koroshite made. (友だちを殺してまで。)
3rd	2011	Sekai no Owari	Earth
3rd	2011	Motohiro Hata	Documentary
4th	2012	Gen Hoshino	Episode
5th	2013	Kyary Pamyu Pamyu	Pamyu Pamyu Revolution
6th	2014	N/A	
7th	2015	N/A	
8th	2016	Wednesday Campanella	Cinema Jack
9th	2017	Aimer	daydream
10th	2018	Typhoon Club	Early Typhoon Club
10th	2018	PUNPEE	MODERN TIMES

=== Best Newcomer Award ===
Awarded from the sixth CD Shop Awards.

No.	Year	Artist	Title
6th	2014	Kana-Boon	Doppel
6th	2014	Kana-Boon	Boku ga CD o Dashitara (僕がCDを出したら)

=== Western music ===
No.	Year	Artist		Title	Source
2nd	2010	Grand Prix	Lady Gaga	The Fame	
2nd	2010	Sub-Grand Prix	Diane Birch	Bible Belt	
2nd	2010	Sub-Grand Prix	The Pains of Being Pure at Heart	The Pains of Being Pure at Heart	
3rd	2011	The Drums		The Drums	
3rd	2011	Maroon 5		Hands All Over	
3rd	2011	Vampire Weekend		Contra	
4th	2012	Foster the People		Torches	
5th	2013	Muse		The 2nd Law	
6th	2014	Paul McCartney		New	
7th	2015	Pharrell Williams		Girl	
8th	2016	Adele		25	
9th	2017	Bruno Mars		24k Magic	
10th	2018	Ed Sheeran		÷ Divide	
11th	2019	Tom Misch		Geography	
12th	2020	Western Award	Billie Eilish	When We All Fall Asleep, Where Do We Go?	
12th	2020	Special Award	Tool	Fear Inoculum	
13th	2021	Beabadoobee		Fake It Flowers	
14th	2022	Måneskin		Teatro d’ira – Vol. I	
15th	2023	Harry Styles		Harry's House	
16th	2024	Olivia Rodrigo		Guts	
17th	2025	Charli XCX		Brat	
