= Prema (album) =

2025 studio album by Fujii Kaze

Studio album by Fujii Kaze
- Released: September 5, 2025
- Studio: ABS (Atlanta)
- Length: 39:46
- Languages: English; Japanese
- Labels: Republic; Universal Sigma; Hehn
- Producers: 250; Rob Bisel; Greg Kurstin; Nolan Lambroza

Fujii Kaze chronology
Fujii Kaze Stadium Live "Feelin' Good" (2024)	Prema (2025)

Singles from Prema
- 1. "Hachikō" Released: June 13, 2025; 2. "Love Like This" Released: August 1, 2025; 3. "Prema" Released: September 5, 2025

Prema (Sanskrit for "divine love") is the third studio album by Japanese singer-songwriter Fujii Kaze and his first English-language album. It was released on September 5, 2025, by Republic Records, Universal Sigma, and Hehn Records, three years after its predecessor Love All Serve All (2022). The album was supported by three singles, "Hachikō", "Love Like This", and the title track. Commercially, Prema debuted atop the Oricon Albums Chart and Billboard Japan Hot Albums and was certified gold for shipments by the Recording Industry Association of Japan (RIAJ).

== Background ==
Japanese singer-songwriter Fujii Kaze released his first two albums Help Ever Hurt Never (2020) and Love All Serve All (2022) to critical acclaim. Since 2022, his songs went viral on social media internationally, including "Shinunoga E-wa" by a Thai TikTok user using the song to post a scene of the character Toge Inumaki from the anime series Jujutsu Kaisen, as well as "Matsuri" for a dance challenge. "Shinunoga E-wa" received a platinum certification for streaming from the Recording Industry Association of Japan (RIAJ), and a gold certification from the Recording Industry Association of America (RIAA), the latter becoming the second Japanese-language song to do so following Kenshi Yonezu's "Kick Back".

On July 26, 2024, alongside the release of his single "Feelin' Good", it was announced that Fujii had signed to Republic Records. Almost a year later, on May 2, 2025, Fujii revealed on video via Instagram that he completed his third studio album "a few weeks ago", but due to multiple reasons, its release would take longer than expected.

== Release and promotion ==
On June 13, 2025, Fujii announced the third studio album, titled Prema, set to be released on September 5, 2025, alongside its cover artwork and track list; it is his first album fully recorded in English. The physical album will come in three versions: the standard and limited editions on CD and vinyl edition. The limited edition includes bonus tracks on a second disc called Pre: Prema, consisting of six previous Japanese-language singles—"Grace", "Workin' Hard", "Hana", "Michi Teyu Ku (Overflowing)", "Feelin' Good", and "Masshiro (Pure White)"—as well as an unreleased song "It's Alright".

Fujii appeared on the cover the July 2025 issue of the magazine Musica, as well as giving an interview, and the poster "No Music, No Life", displaying at all Tower Records Japan stores. He was a guest for Super Eight's music variety show Eight-Jam on August 31, and appeared on the talk show Tetsuko's Room on September 8. His podcast with Spotify Liner Voice+ Fujii Kaze, discussing his album, was launched for three episode on Spotify from September 5 to 9 and also aired via radio stations FM North Wave, J-Wave, Zip-FM, FM802, and Cross FM. NHK broadcast television special NHK Music Special Fujii Kaze: Ima, Sekai de, chronicling his three-year period of making Prema. Pre: Prema was released as a standalone EP digitally on April 3, 2026.

=== Singles and music videos ===
On June 8, 10, and 12, 2025, Fujii uploaded a series of video teasing a new song on his social media, featuring the message "You've been patiently waiting for me", and depicting Fujii in Shibuya, Tokyo walking towards the statue of the dog Hachikō. The song, titled after Hachikō, was released on June 13, 2025, a day before the singer's 28th birthday. Its accompanying music video, directed by Mess, also premiered the same day. It shows two versions of Fujii in otherworldly set, one are wearing white like god and one wearing as black dog. The song peaked at number nine on the Billboard Japan Hot 100.

The second single from the album "Love Like This" was released on August 1, 2025. Its music video depicts love story set in modern-day Europe between Fujii and his love interest with an unexpected turn in the second half. An accompanying music video of the title track, shot at various places in Chiang Dao district, Chiang Mai province, Thailand, premiered in conjunction with the album release on September 5. The music videos for "I Need U Back", "Casket Girl", "It Ain't Over", and "You" were released on October 9, November 28, and January 16, 2026, and September 17, 2026, respectively. The remix version of "You", featuring American singer Umi, was released on September 25.

=== Live performances ===
On June 13, Fujii held a surprise event at the Siam Paragon shopping mall in Bangkok, Thailand to debut "Hachikō". The event caused crowds to gather at the nearby Siam BTS station, resulting in the station entrances and exits to be blocked off, which was met with criticism. He embarked on his European and North American concert tours from July to August and October 2025, including appearances in Roskilde Festival, North Sea Jazz Festival, Montreux Jazz Festival, Lollapalooza, Outside Lands, and Austin City Limits Music Festival. In the European tour, he performed "Love Like This" live for the first time. Fujii gave a debut performances at Music Station on September 5 with "Hachikō" and "Prema". In 2026, he is scheduled to participate the music festivals Lollapalooza India and Coachella, and embark on his concert tour Pre: Prema Tour in July and August and Prema World Tour starting in November.

== Accolades ==
Awards and nominations for Prema
Ceremony	Year	Award	Result	Ref.
Japan Record Awards	2025	Special Album Award	Won	
Music Awards Japan	2026	Album of the Year	Won	

== Commercial performance ==
Prema was a commercial success in Japan, selling 192,000 physical units in its first week, the highest for a solo artist so far for the year of 2025. Released on a Friday near the end of Japan's chart reset, Prema topped the Oricon Digital Albums Chart, Combined Albums Chart and its weekly Albums chart, giving Fujii his second number one album on the chart. On the Billboard Japan charts, Prema topped the Japan Top Albums Sales chart, with 198,000 physical sales reported. With 6,770 downloads reported alongside its physical sales, Prema debuted at number one on the Japan Hot Albums chart.

In the United Kingdom, Prema debuted at number 78 on the UK Albums Sales Chart, marking Fujii's first appearance on the chart.

== Track listing ==
All music is composed by Fujii Kaze.

Prema track listing
No.	Title	Lyrics	Producer(s)	Length
1.	"Casket Girl"	Fujii Kaze; Shy Carter; Dan Wilson	Rob Bisel; 250	4:05
2.	"I Need U Back"	Fujii; Carter	250	3:06
3.	"Hachikō"	Fujii; Tobias Jesso Jr.	Nolan Lambroza; 250	4:30
4.	"Love Like This"	Fujii; Carter	250	4:20
5.	"Prema"	Fujii	250	4:22
6.	"It Ain't Over"	Fujii	250	4:59
7.	"You"	Fujii; Carter	Greg Kurstin; 250	4:41
8.	"Okay, Goodbye"	Fujii; Carter	250	3:50
9.	"Forever Young"	Fujii	250	5:53
Total length:				39:46

Pre: Prema bonus tracks
No.	Title	Lyrics	Producer(s)	Length
1.	"Grace"	Fujii	Yaffle	4:49
2.	"Feelin' Good"	Fujii	A. G. Cook	4:19
3.	"Workin' Hard"	Fujii	Dahi	3:59
4.	"It's Alright"	Fujii	Yaffle	3:22
5.	"Hana" (花)	Fujii	A. G. Cook	4:06
6.	"Michi Teyu Ku (Overflowing)" (満ちてゆく)	Fujii	Yaffle	5:09
7.	"Masshiro (Pure White)" (真っ白)	Fujii		4:57
Total length:				70:27

=== Note ===
- "Feelin' Good is stylized as "Feelin' Go(o)d"

== Personnel ==
Credits adapted from Tidal.

- Fujii Kaze – vocals (all), keyboards (tracks 1, 2, 4–6, 8, 9), saxophone (6)
- Masahito Komori – mixing, engineering
- Daishi Iiba – engineering
- Ryuma Annaka – engineering
- Randy Merrill – mastering
- Shy Carter – background vocals (1, 2, 4, 8, 9)
- Duran – guitar (1, 2, 4, 8)
- Jacob Bugden – drums, guitar, percussion, piano, arrangement (1)
- Seth Tackaberry – bass guitar, percussion (1)
- Luca Caruso – drums, percussion (1)
- Liam Toon – drums (1)
- Artie Zaitz – guitar (1)
- Harrison Whitford – guitar (1)
- Jay Verma – piano (1)
- Breakbot – bass guitar, guitar, string synthesizer (2)
- Koby Shy – bass guitar (3, 5, 8)
- Alexander Sowinski – drums (3, 8)
- Sam Wilkes – bass guitar (6)
- Jake Sherman – strings (7)

== Charts ==
=== Weekly charts ===
Weekly chart performance for Prema
Chart (2025)	Peak position
Japanese Albums (Oricon)	1
Japanese Combined Albums (Oricon)	1
Japanese Hot Albums (Billboard Japan)	1
UK Albums Sales (OCC)	78
US Top Album Sales (Billboard)	14

Weekly chart performance for Pre: Prema
Chart (2026)	Peak position
Japanese Digital Albums (Oricon)	4

=== Monthly charts ===
Monthly chart performance for Prema
Chart (2025)	Position
Japanese Albums (Oricon)	1

=== Year-end charts ===
Year-end chart performance for Prema
Chart (2025)	Position
Japanese Albums (Oricon)	18
Japanese Digital Albums (Oricon)	5
Japanese Hot Albums (Billboard Japan)	12

== Certifications ==
Certifications for Prema
Region	Certification	Certified units/sales
Japan (RIAJ) Physical	Platinum	250,000^{^}
^{^} Shipments figures based on certification alone.

== Release history ==
Release dates and formats for Prema
Region	Date	Format	Version	Label	Ref.
Various	September 5, 2025	CD; digital download; streaming	Standard	Republic; Universal Sigma; Hehn	
Various	September 5, 2025	CD	Limited	Republic; Universal Sigma; Hehn	
Various	September 5, 2025	Vinyl	Vinyl	Republic; Universal Sigma; Hehn	
United Kingdom	September 5, 2025	CD	Standard	Polydor	
United Kingdom	September 5, 2025	CD	Limited	Polydor	
United Kingdom	September 5, 2025	Vinyl	Vinyl	Polydor	
Various	April 3, 2026	Digital download; streaming	Pre: Prema	Republic; Universal Sigma; Hehn	
