= Burning (Hitsujibungaku song) =

Single by Hitsujibungaku

from the album Don't Laugh It Off
- Language: Japanese
- Released: July 3, 2024
- Genre: J-pop; anime song
- Length: 3:53
- Label: F.C.L.S.
- Songwriter: Moeka Shiotsuka
- Producer: Hitsujibungaku

Hitsujibungaku singles chronology
"Shaun the Sheep (Life's a Treat)" (2024)	"Burning" (2024)	"Koe" (2025)

Music video
- "Burning" on YouTube

"Burning" is a song by Japanese rock band Hitsujibungaku from their fifth studio album, Don't Laugh It Off (2025). It was released by F.C.L.S. on July 3, 2024, serving as the ending theme for the second season of Oshi no Ko.

== Background and release ==
The ending theme for the second season of Oshi no Ko was announced on June 30, 2024, at the advance screening event for the anime's first episode at Marunouchi Piccadilly, Chiyoda, Tokyo, to be "Burning", performed by Hitsujibungaku. The song first appeared on the second trailer uploaded on the same day. "Burning" was available on digital music and streaming platforms on July 3, the same day as the anime's televised premiere. The CD single format was released in Japan on August 28, and internationally by Black Screen Records in October 2024.

== Music video ==
A music video for "Burning" premiere on July 3, 2024, at 23:30 (JST), following the first episode of the second season of Oshi no Ko ending. It was directed by Umi Ishihara.

== Live performance ==
Hitsujibungaku debuted the performance of "Burning" at the Singapore show of the band's Asia Tour on July 3, 2024, the same day as the release.

== Accolades ==
Critics' rankings of "Burning"
Critic/Publication	Accolade	Rank	Ref.
Anime News Network	The Best Songs of 2024	—N/a	

Awards and nominations for "Burning"
Ceremony	Year	Award	Result	Ref.
Anime Trending Awards	2025	Ending Theme Song of the Year	Won	
Crunchyroll Anime Awards	2025	Best Ending Sequence	Nominated	
Japan Expo Awards	2025	Daruma for Best Ending	Nominated	
MTV Video Music Awards Japan	2025	Best Rock Video	Won	
Music Awards Japan	2025	Best Japanese Alternative Song	Nominated	
Reiwa Anisong Awards	2025	Artist Song Award	Nominated	

== Track listing ==
- Digital download and streaming (one-track)
1. "Burning" – 3:53
- CD single, digital download and streaming (five-track)
1. "Burning" – 3:53
2. "Burning" (anime version) – 1:33
3. "Burning" (English version) – 3:54
4. "Burning" (acoustic version) – 4:04
5. "Burning" (instrumental) – 3:55
- Blu-ray (CD single)
1. "Burning" (music video) – 3:55
2. "TV Anime Oshi no Ko Season 2 Non-Credit Ending" – 1:29

== Charts ==
Chart performance for "Burning"
Chart (2024)	Peak position
Japan (Japan Hot 100)	82
Japan (Oricon)	35
Japan Anime Singles (Oricon)	11
Japan Digital Singles (Oricon)	15
