= 2025 Music Awards Japan =

2025 music awards ceremony

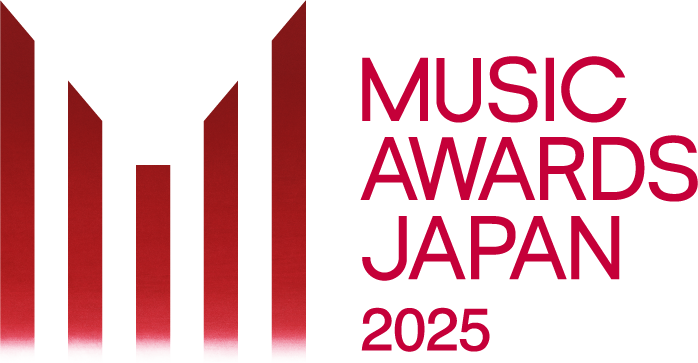
- Date: May 21–22, 2025
- Venue: Rohm Theatre Kyoto
- Country: Japan
- Hosted by: Hiroe Igeta (May 21); Kasumi Mori (May 21); Atsushi Yanaka (May 21); Masaki Suda (May 22)

Highlights
- Most wins: Creepy Nuts (9)
- Most nominations: Fujii Kaze (17)
- Website: musicawardsjapan.com

Television/radio coverage
- Network: NHK; YouTube

The 2025 Music Awards Japan, part of the Music Awards Japan series, is the inaugural award ceremony to be held at Rohm Theatre in Kyoto on May 21–22, 2025. It is organized by the Japan Culture and Entertainment Industry Promotion Association (CEIPA), an organization founded by five major Japanese music associations. Japanese broadcaster NHK announced it would broadcast the second day of the awards show, while both days would be live streamed on YouTube. Hiroe Igeta, Kasumi Mori, and Atsushi Yanaka hosted the first day of the ceremony, and Masaki Suda hosted the second day with foreword from Haruomi Hosono.

Singer-songwriter Fujii Kaze received 17 nominations followed by hip-hop duo Creepy Nuts (16), pop duo Yoasobi (14) and the pop-rock band Mrs. Green Apple (13). Creepy Nuts became the most winning artist with nine awards.

== Showcases and MAJ Music Week ==
In mid-January 2025, CEIPA announced a concert featuring Japanese singer Ado, girl group Atarashii Gakko! and pop duo Yoasobi which took place at Peacock Theater in Los Angeles, California on March 16, 2025. It was the first showcase to be held prior the award ceremony.

Between May 17 though 23rd, 2025, the MAJ Music Week was held. This event which took place in the week of the award show contains out of conferences, seminars and concerts. The second day of the award ceremony was broadcast on NHK General TV, while both days were livestreamed on YouTube globally.

== Nomination process ==
An automatic system will create a pool of eligible works and artists based on metrics by Oricon, Billboard Japan, GfK Japan, Luminate, Usen, Daiichi Kosho Company, JASRAC and others. To be eligible for a nomination an artist has to have released a work between January 29, 2024 to January 26, 2025.

From this generated pool, a panel of persons from the Japanese music industry selects up to five nominees per category. Once the nominations are announced, an international panel will select the winner of each category. The nominees and winners in the categories Best of Listeners' Choice: Japanese Song and Best of Listeners' Choice: International Song are determined entirely through a public vote via Spotify.

During voting process, each eligible voting member are allowed to vote for five songs, artists or albums. It is also allowed to vote once for a work the voting member was directly involved. In the second voting round, only those voting members who participated in the first voting are eligible to vote alongside the international panel members.

On April 21, 2025 the organisers withdrew the nomination of the song "Show" by Ado in the Best Anime Song category for not meeting the nomination criteria of being a song used as opening or ending theme or an insert song in an anime production and issued an apology. It was also announced that a re-vote will take place among the four nominated works.

== Winners and nominees ==
The nominees for 50 categories were announced on April 17, 2025. The nominations for Karaoke of the Year were announced separately. The Best Enka/Kayōkyoku award was announced on May 19, ahead of the ceremony dates. Sub categories and main awards' winners were announced on May 21 and 22.

=== Main categories ===
List of winners and nominees for the main awards
Album of the Year	Artist of the Year
Fujii Kaze – Love All Serve All; Mrs. Green Apple – Antenna; Kenshi Yonezu – Lost Corner; Vaundy – Replica; Hikaru Utada – Science Fiction	Mrs. Green Apple; Creepy Nuts; Fujii Kaze; Vaundy; Yoasobi
Song of the Year	New Artist of the Year
Creepy Nuts – "Bling-Bang-Bang-Born"; Rosé featuring Bruno Mars – "APT."; Yoasobi – "Idol"; Fujii Kaze – "Michiteyuku"; Mrs. Green Apple – "Lilac"	Tuki; Fruits Zipper; Number_i; Omoinotake; Kocchi no Kento
Top Global Hit from Japan	Best Song Asia
Yoasobi – "Idol"; Lotus Juice and Azumi Takahashi – "It's Going Down Now"; XG – "Woke Up"; Fujii Kaze – "Shinunoga E-Wa"; Miki Matsubara – "Mayonaka no Door (Stay with Me)"	Aespa – "Supernova" (South Korea); Bernadya – "Satu Bulan" (Indonesia); Regina Song – "The Cutest Pair" (Singapore); Plave – "Way 4 Luv" (South Korea); Jeff Satur – "Ghost" (Thailand)

=== Sub categories ===
List of winners and nominees for the main awards
Best Japanese Song	Top Japanese Song in Asia
Creepy Nuts – "Bling-Bang-Bang-Born"; Yoasobi – "Idol"; Kenshi Yonezu – "Sayonara, Mata Itsuka!"; Fujii Kaze – "Michiteyuku"; Mrs. Green Apple – "Lilac"	Kenshi Yonezu – "Lemon"; Creepy Nuts – "Bling-Bang-Bang-Born"; Imase – "Night Dancer"; Yoasobi – "Idol"; Yuuri – "Betelgeuse"
Top Japanese Song in Europe	Top Japanese Song in Latin America
Creepy Nuts – "Bling-Bang-Bang-Born"; Kenshi Yonezu – "Kick Back"; Teriyaki Boyz – "Tokyo Drift (Fast & Furious)"; King Gnu – "Specialz"; Yoasobi – "Idol"	Creepy Nuts – "Bling-Bang-Bang-Born"; Imase – "Night Dancer"; King Gnu – "Specialz"; Yoasobi – "Idol"; Miki Matsubara – "Mayonaka no Door (Stay with Me)"
Top Japanese Song in North America	Best J-Rock Song
Creepy Nuts – "Bling-Bang-Bang-Born"; Lotus Juice and Azumi Takahashi – "It's Going Down Now"; Kenshi Yonezu – "Kick Back"; King Gnu – "Specialz"; Miki Matsubara – "Mayonaka no Door (Stay with Me)"	King Gnu – "Specialz"; Omoinotake – "Ikuokukonen"; Vaundy – "Kaijū no Hanauta"; 10-Feet – "Dai Zero-kan"; Mrs. Green Apple – "Lilac"
Best Japanese Hip Hop/Rap Song	Best Japanese R&B/Contemporary Song
Creepy Nuts – "Bling-Bang-Bang-Born"; Chanmina – "B-List"; XG – "Woke Up"; Kenji Ozawa featuring Scha Dara Parr – "Konya wa Boogie Back"; Yuki Chiba – "Team Tomodachi"	Hikaru Utada – "Automatic"; Hikaru Utada – "First Love"; Ayumu Imazu – "Obsessed"; Tatsuro Yamashita – "Ride on Time"; Ai – "Story"; Fujii Kaze – "Kirari"; Fujii Kaze – "Shinunoga E-Wa"; Fujii Kaze – "Hana"; Fujii Kaze – "Michiteyuku"; Chanmina – "Harenchi"
Best Japanese Dance Pop Song	Best Japanese Alternative Song
Creepy Nuts – "Bling-Bang-Bang-Born"; Da-ice – "I Wonder"; Yoasobi – "Idol"; Atarashii Gakko! – "Otonablue"; Ado – "Show"	Hitsujibungaku – "More Than Words"; Hitsujibungaku – "Burning"; Tomoo – "Present"; Rikon Densetsu – "Love Is More Mellow"; Rikon Densetsu – "Honjitsu no Osusume"; Mega Shinnosuke – "Ai to U"; Jo0ji – "Worksong"
Best Japanese Singer-Songwriter Song	Best Enka/Kayōkyoku
Vaundy – "Kaijū no Hanauta"; Kenshi Yonezu – "Sayonara, Mata Itsuka!"; Tuki – "Bansanka"; Aimyon – "Marigold"; Fujii Kaze – "Michiteyuku"	Keisuke Yamauchi – "Kurenai no Chō"'; Leon Shinhama – "Subete Ageyō"; Show-Wa – "Kimi no Ōji-sama"; Junretsu – "Yume Mita Kajitsu"; Matsuri – "Aventure Naka Meguro"
Best Anime Song	Best Idol Culture Song
Yoasobi – "Idol"; Creepy Nuts – "Bling-Bang-Bang-Born"; ~~Ado – "Show"~~; 10-Feet – "Dai Zero-kan"; Mrs. Green Apple – "Lilac"	Fruits Zipper – "Watashi no Ichiban Kawaii Tokoro"; Arashi – "Love So Sweet"; Snow Man – "Love Trigger"; Cutie Street – "Kawaii Dake ja Dame Desu ka?"; Chō Tokimeki Sendenbu – "Saijōkyū ni Kawaii no!"
Best Revival Hit Song	Best Cross-Border Collaboration Song
Eiichi Ohtaki – "Peppermint Blue"; Kiroro – "Best Friend"; Hikaru Utada – "Hikari"; Toshiyuki Nishida – "Moshi mo Piano ga Hiketa nara"; Asian Kung-Fu Generation – "Rewrite"	Fujii Kaze (produced by A. G. Cook) – "Feelin' Good"; One Ok Rock featuring Dan Lancaster (produced by Rob Cavallo) – "Delusion:All"; Megan Thee Stallion featuring Yuki Chiba – "Mamushi"; Babymetal featuring Electric Callboy – "Ratatata"; Hikaru Utada (produced by A. G. Cook) – "Naniiro de mo Nai Hana"
Best Instrumental Song	Best Vocaloid Culture Song
Nujabes – "Aruarian Dance"; Jazztronik – "Evoke"; Special Others – "Good Song"; Ovall – "Stargazer"; Cho Co Pa Co Cho Co Quin Quin – "Chichibu"	Kurousa-P – "Senbonzakura"; Sasuke Haraguchi – "Igaku"; Yoshida Yasei – "Override"; Hiiragi Magnetite – "Tetoris"; Satsuki – "Mesmerizer"
Best Music Video	Best Dance Performance
Yoasobi – "Idol"; Creepy Nuts – "Bling-Bang-Bang-Born"; Kocchi no Kento – "Hai Yorokonde"; Fujii Kaze – "Michiteyuku"; Mrs. Green Apple – "Lilac"	Atarashii Gakko! – "Otonablue"; Number_i – "GOAT"; Sekai no Owari – "Habit"; Da-ice – "I Wonder"; Be:First – "Masterplan"
Best Viral Song	Best Dance/Electronic Song
Creepy Nuts – "Bling-Bang-Bang-Born"; Yoasobi – "Idol"; Cutie Street – "Kawaii Dake ja Dame Desu ka?"; Chō Tokimeki Sendenbu – "Saijōkyū ni Kawaii no!"; Kocchi no Kento – "Hai Yorokonde"	Wednesday Campanella – "Edison"; Testset – "Moneyman"; Chari Chari – "Of Mystic Rhythms (Psychic Thermometry mix)"; Towa Tei featuring Takkyu Ishino – "Typical!"; Denki Groove – "Denki Groove 34 Shūnen no Uta"
Best Jazz Album	Best Classical Album
Akiko Yano and Hiromi Uehara – Step Into Paradise — Live in Tokyo; Makoto Ozone – Day 1; Sadao Watanabe – Peace; Seiko Matsuda – Seiko Jazz 3; Ovall – Still Water	Ryūichi Sakamoto – Opus; Nobuyuki Tsujii – The Best; Hayato Kadono – Human Universe; Joe Hisaishi – A Symphonic Celebration – Music from the Studio Ghibli Films of Hayao Miyazaki; Fujiko Hemming – Kiseki no Campanella
Best DJ	Best Japanese Song Artist
DJ Nobu; Dazzle Drums; DJ Koco; Okadada; Yōsuke Yukimatsu	Mrs. Green Apple; Vaundy; Yoasobi; Fujii Kaze; Kenshi Yonezu
Best J-Rock Artist	Best Japanese Hip Hop/Rap Artist
King Gnu; Mrs. Green Apple; Official Hige Dandism; One Ok Rock; Vaundy	Creepy Nuts; Awich; XG; Yuki Chiba; Chanmina
Best Japanese R&B/Contemporary Artist	Best Japanese Dance Pop Artist
Hikaru Utada; Chanmina; Fujii Kaze; Gen Hoshino; Tatsuro Yamashita	Atarashii Gakko!; Be:First; Creepy Nuts; Mrs. Green Apple; Yoasobi
Best Japanese Alternative Artist	Best Idol Artist/Group
Hitsujibungaku; Kroi; Rikon Densetsu; Tomoo; Toki Asako	Snow Man; Cutie Street; Fruits Zipper; NiziU; Nogizaka46
Best Japanese Singer-Songwriter
Fujii Kaze; Aimyon; Hikaru Utada; Vaundy; Kenshi Yonezu
Best International Rock Song in Japan	Best International Alternative Song in Japan
Coldplay – "Feelslikeimfallinginlove"; Green Day – "The American Dream Is Killing Me"; Linkin Park – "The Emptiness Machine"; Post Malone featuring Morgan Wallen – "I Had Some Help"; Bon Jovi – "Legendary"	Billie Eilish – "Birds of a Feather"; Billie Eilish – "Chihiro"; Billie Eilish – "Lunch"; Vampire Weekend – "Classical"; Ginger Root – "No Problems"; Keshi – "Say"; Mina Okabe – "Strong"
Best International Hip Hop/Rap Song in Japan	Best International R&B/Contemporary Song in Japan
Kendrick Lamar – "Not Like Us"; Snoop Dogg featuring Sting – "Another Part of Me"; Kendrick Lamar featuring SZA – "Luther"; Megan Thee Stallion featuring Yuki Chiba – "Mamushi"; Eminem, Big Sean and Babytron – "Tobey"	Ariana Grande – "We Can't Be Friends (Wait for Your Love)"; The Weeknd – "Dancing in the Flames"; Norah Jones – "Running"; SZA – "Saturn"; Beyoncé – "Texas Hold 'Em"
Best International Pop Song in Japan	Best K-Pop Song in Japan
Rosé featuring Bruno Mars – "APT."; Lady Gaga featuring Bruno Mars – "Die with a Smile"; Sabrina Carpenter – "Espresso"; Taylor Swift featuring Post Malone – "Fortnight"; Beyoncé – "Texas Hold 'Em"	NewJeans – "Ditto"; BTS – "Dynamite"; Illit – "Magnetic"; Le Sserafim – "Perfect Night"; NewJeans – "Supernatural"; Aespa – "Supernova"; Aespa – "Whiplash"
Special Award: Chinese Popular Music	Special Award: Indonesian Popular Music
Zhou Shen – "Shao Guan Wo"	Salma Salsabil – "Bunga Hati"
Special Award: Korean Popular Music	Special Award: Philippine Popular Music
Seventeen – "God of Music"	Lola Amour – "Raining in Manila"
Special Award: Thai Popular Music	Special Award: Vietnamese Popular Music
Jeff Satur – "Ghost"	Tùng Dương – "Tái Sinh"
Karaoke of the Year: J-Pop	Karaoke of the Year: Enka/Kayōkyoku
Mrs. Green Apple – "Lilac"; Creepy Nuts – "Bling-Bang-Bang-Born"; Mrs. Green Apple – "Que Sera Sera"; Omoinotake – "Ikuokukonen"; Tuki – "Bansanka"	Yoshimi Tendo – "Shōwa Katagi"; Kosui Iwamoto – "Taki no Renka"; Natsumi Kawano – "Kita no Renjōka"; Naoki Sanada – "246"; Junko Akimoto – "Hitorigoto"
Special Award: Oshi-Katsu Request Artist of the Year	Special Award: Radio Best Radio-Break Song
Number_i; Be:First; INI; JO1; King & Prince; NiziU; SB19; Tomorrow X Together; V; Sakurazaka46	Rikon Densetsu – "Love Is More Mellow"; Hitsujibungaku – "More Than Words"; Omoinotake – "Ikuokukonen"; Retroriron – "Asedō"; Jo0ji – "Dasa"
Song of the Year for Creators	Honorary Award in Music-Technology
Ayase – "Idol" by Yoasobi	Association of Musical Electronics Industry
Largest Live Audience	MAJ Timeless Echo
West	Eikichi Yazawa
Grand Prix Engineer
Katsutoshi Kitamura and Eiji Uchinuma – Mixer's Lab Sound Series Vol.4's "Chiisana Hana" by Kenichi Tsunoda Big Band; Toshiyasu Shiozawa and Hiroshi Satō – The Second Movement of Symphony No. 5 by Andrea Pattistoni and Tokyo Philharmonic Orchestra; Hidekazu Sakai and Hideyuki Matsuhashi – "Sweetest Tune" by Travis Japan; Kōji Suzuki – Music of the Sphere - Immersive Classics's "Metamorphosis I - For Two Pianos" by Yoshitake Hasegawa and Yukari Gotō; Toshirō Kai – Anniversary EP's "Boku Note (For 20th Anniversary with Orchestra)" by Sukima Switch
Best of Listeners' Choice: Japanese Song	Best of Listeners' Choice: International Song
Number_i – "GOAT"; Number_i – "Bon"; Number_i – "Inzm"; Be:First – "Masterplan"; Be:First – "Blissful"; INI – "Loud"; INI – "WMDA (Where My Dreams At)"; JO1 – "Love Seeker"; NEWS – "Chankapāna"; Cutie Street – "Kawaii Dake ja Dame Desu ka?"; Fujii Kaze – "Michiteyuku"; Fujii Kaze – "Hana"; Sakurazaka46 – "Jigōjitoku"; Sakurazaka46 – "Ikutsu no Koro ni Modoritai no ka?"; Fruits Zipper – "Watashi no Ichiban Kawaii Tokoro"; NiziU – "Sweet Nonfiction"; Mrs. Green Apple – "Lilac"; Gemn – "Fatal"; MiSaMo – "New Look"; Me:I – "Click"; XG – "Woke Up"; Da-ice – "I Wonder"; Kenshi Yonezu – "Sayonara, Mata Itsuka!"; The Rampage from Exile Tribe – "24karats Gold Genesis"; King Gnu – "Specialz"; King Gnu – "Nekko"; Creepy Nuts – "Bling-Bang-Bang-Born"; Yoasobi – "Idol"; Yorushika – "Sunny"; Omoinotake – "Ikuokukonen"	Megan Thee Stallion featuring RM – "Neva Play"; Megan Thee Stallion featuring Twice – "Mamushi" (remix); Megan Thee Stallion featuring Yuki Chiba – "Mamushi"; Plave – "Way 4 Luv"; Seventeen – "Shohikigen"; NewJeans – "Supernatural"; NewJeans – "How Sweet"; Rosé featuring Bruno Mars – "APT."; Lyodra – "Pesan Terakhir"; TJ Monterde – "Palagi"; Babymonster – "Drip"; Zhou Shen – "Little Joys"; Illit – "Magnetic"; Sơn Tùng M-TP – "Đừng Làm Trái Tim Anh Đau"; Aespa – "Whiplash"; Aespa – "Supernova"; Le Sserafim – "Perfect Night"; Le Sserafim – "Crazy"; Lady Gaga featuring Bruno Mars – "Die with a Smile"; Maki – "Dilaw"; Taylor Swift featuring Post Malone – "Fortnight"; Ernie Zakri – "Masing Masing"; Sabrina Carpenter – "Espresso"; Kendrick Lamar – "Not Like Us"; Ginger Root – "No Problems"; Bernadya – "Satu Bulan"; Gracie Abrams – "That's So True"; Kendrick Lamar featuring SZA – "Luther"; OneRepublic – "Nobody"; Jeff Satur – "Ghost"

== Performers ==
=== May 21: Opening ceremony ===
List of performers at the opening ceremony
Artist(s)	Song(s)
The Spellbound	"Kick It Out"
Leo	"Thousand Knives"
Show-Go	Beat boxing performance
Kōhei Ueno	"Uno Ueno"

=== May 22: Grand ceremony ===
List of performers at the grand ceremony
Artist(s)	Song(s)
Various artists (Note: List of performers: Perfume; Yoshinori Sunahara; Stuts; Chanmina; Number_i; Vaundy; Hatsune Miku; Hayato Sumino; Yuki Chiba; Takashi Hosokawa; Ichiro Yamaguchi; Fruits Zipper; Cutie Street; 10-Feet; Atarashii Gakko!; Yuki; Yasuyuki Okamura)	"Rydeen Reboot"
Yoasobi	"Players"
Creepy Nuts	"Bling-Bang-Bang-Born"
Chanmina	"Harenchi" "King" "Bijin" "Work Hard"
Hikaru Utada	"Electricity" (pre-recorded)
Eikichi Yazawa	"It's Up to You!" "Tomaranai Ha-Ha" "Yes My Love"
Fujii Kaze	"Michiteyuku"
Ai Awich	"Not So Different" (remix)
Awich	"Butcher Shop"
Awich Ai Nene Mari	"Bad Bitch Bigaku" (remix)
Mrs. Green Apple	"Darling"
