= Michiteyuku =

Single by Fujii Kaze
- Language: Japanese
- Released: March 15, 2024
- Genre: J-pop
- Length: 5:09
- Label: Universal Sigma; Hehn
- Songwriter: Fujii Kaze
- Producer: Yaffle

Fujii Kaze singles chronology
"Hana" (2023)	"Michiteyuku" (2024)	"Feelin' Go(o)d" (2024)

Music video
- "Michiteyuku" on YouTube

"Michiteyuku" (Note: Alternatively titled "Michi Teyu Ku (Overflowing)") (満ちてゆく; lit. 'becoming filled') is a song by Japanese singer-songwriter Fujii Kaze, released on March 15, 2024, through Universal Sigma and Hehn Records. The song served as the theme song for Japanese film April Come She Will (2024). "Michiteyuku" was later included on Fujii's third studio album, Prema, as a bonus track.

== Music video ==
A music video for "Michiteyuku" was released on YouTube on March 15, 2024, the same day as the single release. It was directed by Yamada Tomokazu.

== Live performances ==
Fujii performed "Michiteyuku" live on the 75th NHK Kōhaku Uta Gassen on December 31, 2024, remotely from New York City, United States, during the sunset of the New Year's Eve. In the show, he sang the song in the street in the city before ending up on a rooftop with the background of skyscrapers.

== Accolades ==
Awards and nominations for "Michiteyuku"
Ceremony	Year	Award	Result	Ref.
Music Awards Japan	2025	Song of the Year	Nominated	
Music Awards Japan	2025	Best Japanese Song	Nominated	
Music Awards Japan	2025	Best Japanese R&B/Contemporary Song	Nominated	
Music Awards Japan	2025	Best Japanese Singer-Songwriter Song	Nominated	
Music Awards Japan	2025	Best Music Video	Nominated	
Music Awards Japan	2025	Best of Listeners' Choice: Japanese Song	Nominated	

== Personnel ==
- Fujii Kaze – vocals, songwriter, synthesizer
- Yaffle – producer
- Masahito Komori – recording, mixing
- Tsubasa Yamazaki – mastering

== Charts ==
=== Weekly charts ===
Weekly chart performance for "Michiteyuku"
Chart (2024)	Peak position
Global 200 (Billboard)	139
Japan (Japan Hot 100)	4
Japan Combined Singles (Oricon)	5

=== Year-end charts ===
2024 year-end chart performance for "Michiteyuku"
Chart (2024)	Position
Japan (Japan Hot 100)	44

2025 year-end chart performance for "Michiteyuku"
Chart (2025)	Position
Japan (Japan Hot 100)	60

== Certifications ==
Certifications for "Michiteyuku"
Region	Certification	Certified units/sales
Streaming
Japan (RIAJ)	2× Platinum	200,000,000^{†}
^{†} Streaming-only figures based on certification alone.
