= Kirari (Fujii Kaze song) =

2021 single by Fujii Kaze

Single by Fujii Kaze

from the album Love All Serve All
- Language: Japanese
- Released: May 3, 2021
- Genre: Pop
- Length: 3:51
- Label: Hehn; Universal Sigma
- Songwriter: Fujii Kaze
- Producer: Yaffle

Fujii Kaze singles chronology
"Tabiji" (2021)	"Kirari" (2021)	"Mo-Eh-Yo (Ignite)" (2021)

Music video
- "Kirari" on YouTube

"Kirari" (きらり; lit. onomatopoeia of momentary flash of light) is a song by Japanese singer-songwriter Fujii Kaze, taken from his second studio album Love All Serve All (2022). It was released on May 3, 2021, through Hehn Records and Universal Sigma. Written by Fujii himself and produced by Yaffle, the song is a pop track infused with a funky disco sound, expressing the importance of the kirari moments in daily lives. The song featured in Japan's Honda Vezel 2021 advertisement.

A music video for "Kirari" premiered on May 21. It was directed by Spikey John, who previously directed Fujii's "Mo-Eh-Wa" music video (2019). The song debuted and peaked at number two on the Billboard Japan Hot 100, and charted there for 158 weeks. Fujii gave the televised debut performance of "Kirari", alongside "Mo-Eh-Yo", at 72nd NHK Kōhaku Uta Gassen on December 31, which he pretended to perform the song remotely from his house at Satoshō, Okayama, before surprising that he was already in Tokyo International Forum, where the show held. The remix EP, titled Kirari Remixes (Asia Edition), was released on January 14, 2022.

== Accolades ==
Awards and nominations for "Kirari"
Ceremony	Year	Award	Result	Ref.
Music Awards Japan	2025	Best Japanese R&B/Contemporary Song	Nominated	

== Track listing ==
- Digital download / streaming
1. "Kirari" (きらり) – 3:51
- Remixes EP (Kirari Remixes (Asia Edition))
1. "Kirari" (original remix) – 4:19
2. "Kirari" (Daul remix) – 4:05
3. "Kirari" (FunkyMo remix) – 4:31
4. "Kirari" (PXZVC remix) – 4:47
5. "Kirari" (Kaze & Yaffle Just for Fun remix) – 3:41
6. "Kirari" (Knopha remix) – 5:05
7. "Kirari" (Naken remix) – 4:09
8. "Kirari" (Yaffle remix) – 3:04
9. "Kirari" – 3:51

== Credits and personnel ==
- Fujii Kaze – vocals, songwriter, synthesizer
- Yaffle – producer, recording arrangement
- Bunta Otsuki – electric guitar

== Charts ==
=== Weekly charts ===
Weekly chart performance for "Kirari"
Chart (2021–2025)	Peak position
Global 200 (Billboard)	135
Japan (Japan Hot 100)	2
Japan Combined Singles (Oricon)	5

Weekly chart performance for Kirari Remixes (Asia Edition)
Chart (2022)	Peak position
Japanese Combined Albums (Oricon)	15

=== Year-end charts ===
2021 year-end chart performance for "Kirari"
Chart (2021)	Position
Global Excl. US (Billboard)	180
Japan (Japan Hot 100)	19

2022 year-end chart performance for "Kirari"
Chart (2022)	Position
Japan (Japan Hot 100)	19

2023 year-end chart performance for "Kirari"
Chart (2023)	Position
Japan (Japan Hot 100)	62

2024 year-end chart performance for "Kirari"
Chart (2024)	Position
Japan (Japan Hot 100)	88

2025 year-end chart performance for "Kirari"
Chart (2025)	Position
Japan (Japan Hot 100)	94

=== All-time charts ===
All-time chart performance for "Kirari"
Chart (2008–2022)	Position
Japan (Japan Hot 100)	49

== Certifications ==
Certifications for "Kirari"
Region	Certification	Certified units/sales
Japan (RIAJ)	Platinum	250,000^{*}
Streaming
Japan (RIAJ)	Diamond	500,000,000^{†}
^{*} Sales figures based on certification alone.^{†} Streaming-only figures based on certification alone.

== Release history ==
Release dates and formats for "Kirari"
Region	Date	Format	Version	Label	Ref.
Various	May 3, 2021	Digital download; streaming	Original	Hehn; Universal Sigma	
Various	January 14, 2022	Digital download; streaming	Remixes EP	Hehn; Universal Sigma	
