= Fujii Kaze =

Japanese singer-songwriter and pianist

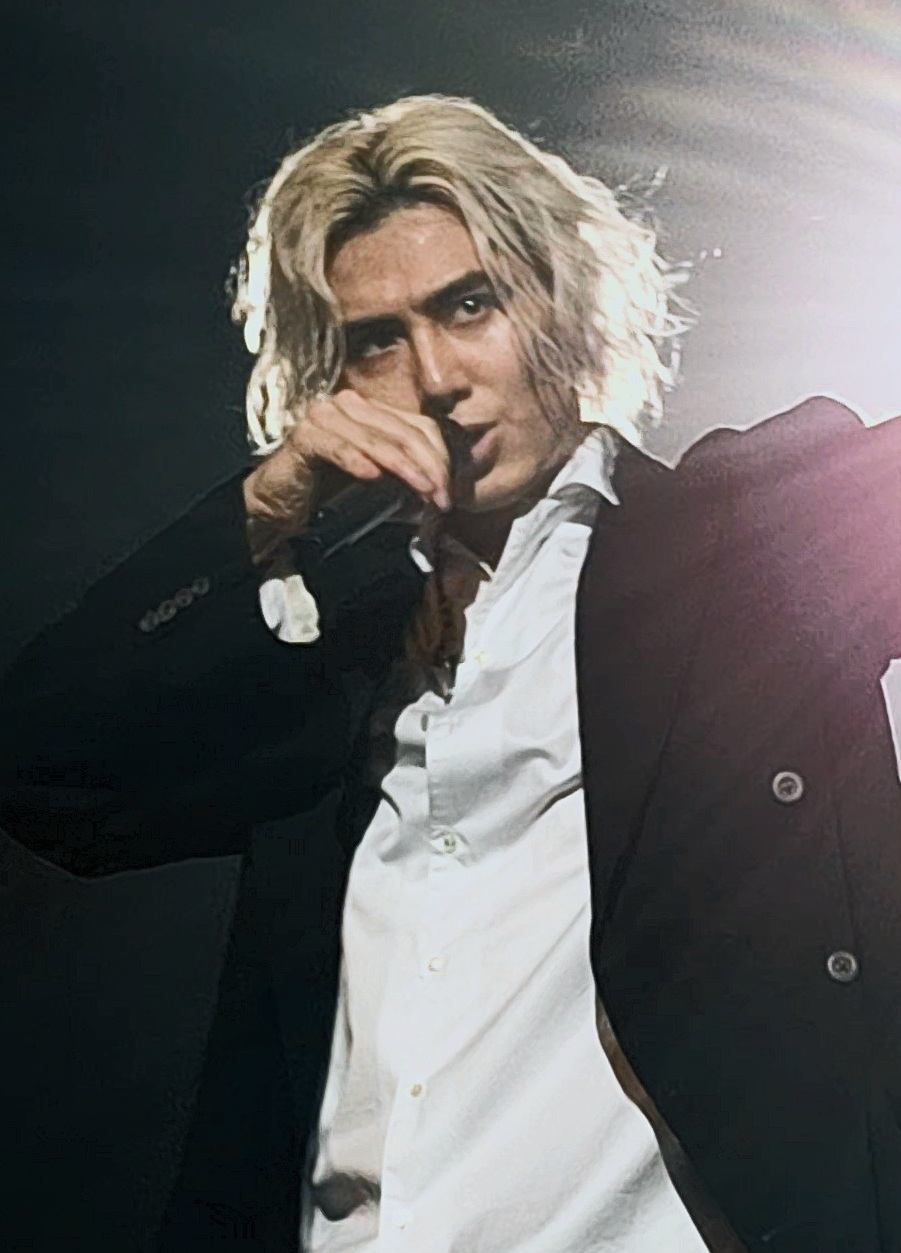
- Kaze in 2024
- Born: June 14, 1997 (age 29); Satoshō, Okayama, Japan
- Occupations: Singer-songwriter; musician
- Years active: 2019–present
- Musical career
- Origin: Japan
- Genres: J-pop; R&B; pop
- Instruments: Vocals; keyboards; saxophone
- Labels: Universal Sigma; Hehn; Republic
- Website: fujiikaze.com

Fujii Kaze (藤井 風; born June 14, 1997) is a Japanese singer-songwriter and musician. Born and raised in Satoshō, Okayama, he began uploading piano covers of pop songs to YouTube at the age of 12. Signed to Universal Sigma's Hehn Records, Fujii released his debut single, "Nan-Nan", in 2019. His first studio album, Help Ever Hurt Never (2020), reached number one on Billboard Japan's Hot Albums chart and number two on the Oricon Albums Chart and was certified gold in Japan. The song "Shinunoga E-Wa" became viral on social media and brought Fujii to fame beyond Japan.

Fujii's second studio album, Love All Serve All (2022), topped the albums charts of both Billboard Japan and Oricon, and it was certified platinum in Japan. The album was supported by the lead single "Kirari", which peaked at number two on the Japan Hot 100 and was certified triple platinum for streaming in Japan. In 2023–2024, Fujii released standalone singles including "Workin' Hard", "Hana" and "Michiteyuku" and embarked on concert tours outside Japan. He then released his first English language album, Prema on September 5, 2025.

== Biography ==
=== Early musical beginnings ===
Fujii Kaze was born in 1997 in Satoshō in Okayama, Japan, and has one older brother and two older sisters. As a child, he listened to all kinds of music such as jazz, classical music, pop, and enka. Starting at 12 years old, Fujii uploaded various piano and vocal cover videos on his personal YouTube channel, amassing more than 30 million views. During his high school years, he stopped uploading to focus on his musical studies; he returned to YouTube after he graduated. In early 2019, he moved to Tokyo.

=== 2019–2020: Major label debut, Help Ever Hurt Never ===
Fujii released his debut single, "Nan-Nan" on November 18, 2019, and his second single, "Mo-Eh-Wa" on December 24. In January 2020, he was named as one of Spotify's Early Noise 2020 Top 10 Breaking Artists. One-man live performances in the form of Nan-Nan Show 2020 were scheduled for April 4 and 26 at Zepp Namba and Zepp Tokyo respectively, but were cancelled due to the COVID-19 pandemic.

Fujii released his first studio album Help Ever Hurt Never on May 20, 2020, and reached number one on the Billboard Japan Hot Albums chart. He also announced his first national hall tour, which consisted of 12 performances in 11 cities from December 25, 2020, to January 31, 2021. In August 2020, Fujii became the first Japanese person to be named YouTube's Artist on the Rise. Immediately after Fujii Kaze "Nan-Nan Show 2020" Help Ever Hurt Never at Nippon Budokan, Fujii released two new singles: "Hedemo Ne-Yo" and "Seishun Sick" on October 30.

=== 2021: Two tie-ins, Nissan stadium "Free" live and 1st NHK Kohaku appearance ===
In January 2021, "Tabiji" started airing on TV Asahi as the theme song for the TV drama series Nijiiro Carte. The song was digitally released as his 7th single on March 1, and on the same day, Fujii performed the song live with piano during the TV news program Houdo Station, which was his first live TV appearance. The song won first place in the Oricon Weekly Digital Single Ranking which was announced on March 10. On March 8, Fujii won the Best Breakthrough Artist award at Space Shower Music Awards 2021. On March 10, Fujii won the "Popular New Artist" Award at the 33rd Music Pen Club Music Awards. Furthermore, on March 23, Help Ever Hurt Never won the Grand Prize Blue at the 13th CD Shop Awards.

On April 22, "Kirari" started airing in the new Honda Vezel TV ad. "Kirari" was later released as Fujii's 8th single on May 3. The song led to an explosion of his popularity both domestically and internationally, debuting at number one on the Billboard Japan Download Songs chart. The music video of "Kirari" was released on the official YouTube channel on May 21, which incorporated dance and motorcycle scenes that Fujii requested by himself for the first time, according to Fujii's 'After Talk' live streaming. "Kirari" surpassed 100 million streamings in August 2021 and 300 million streamings in June 2022. On January 14 of the following year, Fujii digitally released a remix EP Kirari Remixes (Asia Edition) .

On May 20, 2021, in commemoration of the 1st anniversary of Help Ever Hurt Never, Help Ever Hurt Cover which was originally came with the 1st edition of Help Ever Hurt Never as a bonus disc, was reprinted and also digitally released. Help Ever Hurt Cover contains 11 English cover songs. Along with this, the analog record of Help Ever Hurt Never was also resold (limited quantity production by lottery) . In August 2021, Fujii Kaze was named one of the most exciting musicians around the world by GQ. On September 4, "Fujii Kaze "Free" Live 2021 at Nissan Stadium" was held at Nissan Stadium in Kanagawa, Japan. This performance was live-streamed on Fujii's official YouTube channel for free, and about 180,000 people watched it simultaneously, recording the world's No.1 trending word. On the same day, Fujii performed " Mo-E-Yo" for the first time and the song was released as a digital single.

From October to November, "Fujii Kaze "Help Ever Arena Tour"" was held. The concert movie (Blu-ray) of the final performance at Yoyogi National Gymnasium was released on June 14, 2022 and ranked No. 1 for the second consecutive year, which made Fujii Kaze the first solo artist in the history to have two consecutive No. 1 for its concert movies. On December 31, 2021, Fujii performed on the prestigious year-end music program, NHK Kōhaku Uta Gassen, for the first time. He performed "Kirari" first, which was pre-recorded at his parents' home in Okayama, Japan. Fujii then made a surprise live appearance at Kohaku venue at the Tokyo International Forum, where he performed "Mo-E-Yo" live with piano on stage. In the grand finale, Fujii accompanied Misia, who sang "Higher Love", which was the first song Fujii had composed for another artist. Fujii took part in piano and the chorus.

=== 2022: Second album Love All Serve All ===
On January 14, 2022, Fujii released the EP Kirari Remixes (Asia Edition). On January 21, 2022, Fujii announced that his second studio album, Love All Serve All, would be released on March 23, 2022. On March 15, Fujii was awarded a very prestigious Art Encouragement Prize for New Artist (popular entertainment category) by Minister of Education, Culture, Sports, Science and Technology. On the same day, Fujii also received three awards at the Space Shower Music Awards 2022: Best Solo Artist, Best Conceptual Live, and People's Choice which was chosen by the public vote of music fans.

On March 20, lead single of Love All Serve All, "Matsuri", was pre-released at the same time as its music video. On the following day, March 21, live-streaming of the album's advance viewing "'Love All Serve All' Listening Party" was held on Fujii's official YouTube channel followed by 'LASA Listening YouTube Premium Afterparty' on YouTube Premium. On March 23, Love All Serve All was released both in physical and digital format. The album reached No. 1 on Billboard Japan's Hot Album chart and got numerous prestigious awards.

Since July 2022, Fujii was brought to the attention of a global audience due to one of his songs from Help Ever Hurt Never, "Shinunoga E-Wa", going viral on TikTok. The song reached #4 on Spotify's Global Viral chart, and also reached #1 on the platform's local viral charts in 23 countries. On Spotify's Global Song chart, it reached #57, and also the #118th position on the US Billboard Global 200 chart, despite the song being originally released in 2020. On YouTube's Global Top Songs chart, the song spent 12 weeks, peaking at #33.

On October 10, 2022, Fujii released the digital single "Grace". The song served as the theme song for his collaboration with NTT Docomo (Japan's largest telecommunications company), "Kaze Films Docomo Future Project". The project films were broadcast as TV commercials throughout Japan for few months. Fujii shot "Grace"'s music video in Uttarakhand, India. In October 2022, Fujii held a stadium show called "Love All Serve All Stadium Live" at Panasonic Stadium Suita in Osaka, Japan, attracting 70,000 people in two days. On March 10, 2023, this performance was broadcast on Netflix globally as Fujii Kaze Love All Serve All Stadium Live. On December 17, 2022, Fujii began his nationwide arena tour "Fujii Kaze Love All Arena Tour" of 16 shows in 8 Japanese cities. The tour ended in February 2023, garnering an audience of 210,000 people.

=== 2023: First international tour 'Fujii Kaze and the Piano Asia Tour 2023' ===
Fujii held an Asian tour, Fujii Kaze and the Piano Asia Tour 2023, from June to July 2023. The tour, which was Fujii's first overseas tour, consisted of a total of eight performances in seven cities (Seoul, Bangkok, Jakarta, Kuala Lumpur, Shanghai, Taipei and Hong Kong). Fujii performed solely with a piano. It was also announced that vinyl editions of Fujii's first album and second set Love All Serve All would be released in the touring markets and re-released in Japan in conjunction with the tour. On April 21, Fujii was featured on a remix of Jvke's song "Golden Hour".

On July 4, it was announced that Fujii's single "Workin' Hard" was selected as the theme song for "FIBA Basketball World Cup 2023", which was broadcast on Nippon TV and TV Asahi from August 25. In preparation for the production of this song, Fujii visited and watched the B-League and Japan's national team matches, as well as NBA games in the US. He then stayed in Los Angeles to create a demo of the song. After returning to Japan, Fujii continued working on the song. In his busy schedule with his Asian tour and video production, he went back to Los Angeles to record the song. The song's sound producer is DJ Dahi; the mix engineer is Jeff Ellis; and the mastering engineer is Dale Becker. On August 8, Fujii announced on X (previously Twitter) that "Workin' Hard" had been pre-released exclusively on TikTok in four parts, while the full song would be released on August 25.

Fujii's song "Garden" from Love All Serve All was used in a TV advertisement for fabric softener Laundrin, which depicts the life of a single girl in tune with the song. Fujii was featured in the advertisement as narrator. On October 10, it was announced that Fujii's song "Hana" was selected as the theme song for TV drama series Ichiban Sukina Hana, scheduled to air from October 12. The song was released on October 13 as his 14th single.

=== 2024: Concerts and touring ===
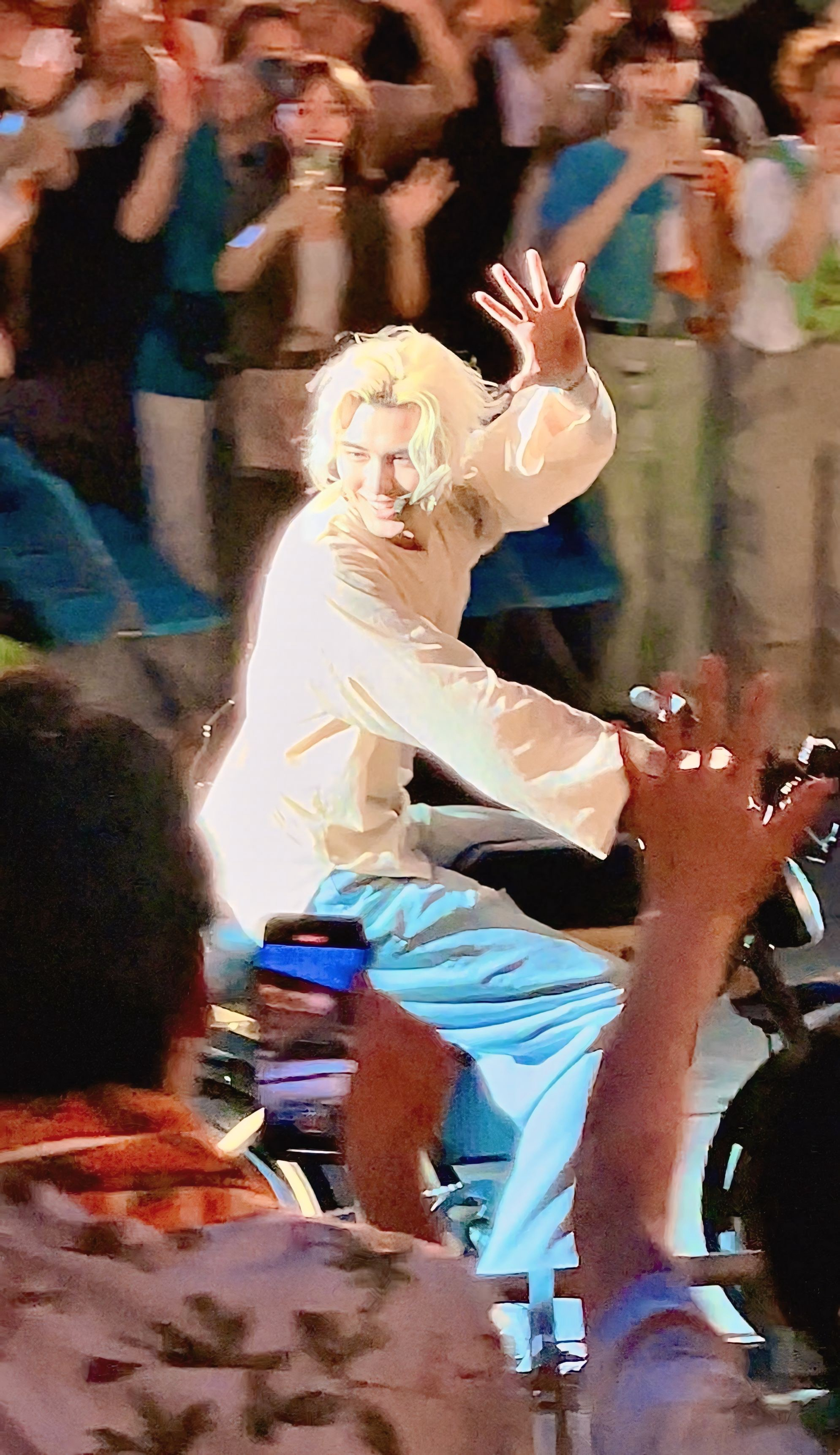
Fujii in 2024

On January 15, it was announced that Fujii's new song "Overflowing (Michi Teyu Ku)' would be the theme song for the movie "Shigatsu ni Nareba Kanojyo Wa" starring Sato Takeru and Nagasawa Masami. This song was released on March 15.

On March 11, it was announced that Fujii would perform as the first guest on the new NHK content Tiny Desk Concerts Japan. This program is a Japanese version of a music content program that has been broadcast online by National Public Radio (NPR), an American public broadcasting station, since 2008. On March 16, a performance held at the NHK office in Shibuya, Tokyo, was broadcast inside Japan on NHK channel as well as worldwide on NHK WORLD-JAPAN, NHK's international broadcasting network. On March 20, it was announced that the song "Workin' Hard" would be featured in Japanese job-search website Dip's new commercial "Let's get started!" featuring Otani Shohei of the Dodgers. On May 28, the compilation album "Best of Fujii Kaze 2020-2024" was digitally released. The album contains 10 of Fujii's songs from released in his career from 2020 to 2024.

On May 30, Fujii started his first U.S. tour, "Fujii Kaze and the piano U.S. Tour". He performed in Los Angeles and New York. Around the same time, "Shinunoga E-Wa (I'd Rather Die)" was certified Gold by the Recording Industry Association of America (RIAA) and received a custom-made gold disc plaque from Republic Records after performances at the Apollo Theater on June 2 and 3. On July 26, the 13th single "Feelin' Go(o)d" was released. This song was produced in Los Angeles by the producer A.G. Cook, following the release of their prior collaboration, "Hana", last year. On the same day it was announced that Fujii had signed to Republic Records. The song was also used in Landrin's "Fragrance and Memory" TV commercial airing on August 1. This marks Fujii's second collaborative commercial tie-in for Landrin, following last year's "Garden" (with Fujii once again featured as narrator).

On August 24 and 25, Fujii Kaze held live concert "Fujii Kaze Stadium Live 'Feelin’ Good" at Nissan Stadium. The first day's performance on August 24 was broadcast live on Fujii's YouTube channel. An estimated 140,000 people attended the concert over the two days, while 280,000 people watched the live-streaming. After this performance, it was announced that Fujii's second Asia Tour "Best of Fujii Kaze 2020-2024 Asia Tour" would begin on October 26. It is slated to consist of Fujii performing in arenas and stadiums in eight Asian cities (Singapore, Kuala Lumpur, Bangkok, Taipei, Jakarta, Hong Kong, Manila and Seoul).

=== 2025: Prema ===
Fujii released his first English-language studio album and third overall, Prema on September 5, 2025. It was preceded by the lead single "Hachikō".

=== 2026: World Tour ===
On April 3, Fujii Kaze released the compilation album "Pre-Prema", which included all of his previously released singles and the new single "It's Alright". On April 21, Fujii announced the "Prema World Tour", which would start on October 31 in Japan and expand to Europe and North America in the summer of 2027 in three European cities (Cologne, London, Paris) and six North American cities (Chicago, Los Angeles, Mexico, New York, San Francisco, Toronto).

== Artistry ==
Fujii writes/composes all of his songs. Fujii's music has been described as "fresh yet familiar", with clear influence stemming from the western music he grew up with. Kurihara Yūichirō of Nippon.com has written that his vocals are "reminiscent of Japan's kayōkyoku pop standards", making his music also distinctly Japanese.

== Discography ==
- Help Ever Hurt Never (2020)
- Love All Serve All (2022)
- Prema (2025)

== Music videos ==
Year	Date	Song	Director	Notes
2020	January 23	"Nan-Nan"	Chris Rudz	Also known as "WTF" / "WTF lol"
2020	February 20	"Mo-Eh-Wa	Spikey John	
2020	April 16	"Yasashisa"	Kento Yamada	
2020	May 14	"Kiri ga Naikara"	Kento Yamada	
2020	September 4	"Kaerou"	Kodama Yuichi	
2020	December 4	"Hedemo Ne-Yo"	Kento Yamada	
2020	December 11	"Seishun Sick"	Tomokazu Yamada	
2021	March 10	"Tabiji"	Kento Yamada	
2021	May 21	"Kirari"	Spikey John	
2021	October 24	"Mo-Eh-Yo"	Kazuaki Seki	Music video shot on Google Pixel 6
2022	March 20	"Matsuri"	Mess	
2022	September 30	"Damn"	Kento Yamada	
2022	October 10	"Grace"	QQQ	
2023	August 25	"Workin' Hard"	Mess	
2023	November 24	"Hana"	Mess	
2024	March 15	"Michi Teyu Ku (Overflowing)"	Tomokazu Yamada	
2024	July 25	"Feelin' Good"	Mess	
2025	June 12	"Hachikō"	Mess	
2025	August 1	"Love Like This"	Aerin Moreno	
2025	September 5	"Prema"	Mess	
2025	October 9	"I Need U Back"	Nina McNeely	
2025	November 28	"Casket Girl"	Charles Mehling	
2026	January 16	"It Ain’t Over"	Kento Yamada	
2026	April 22	"It's Alright"	Nina McNeely	
2026	June 19	"Comets + Gold" (with Elmiene)	Patrick Linehan	
2026	September 17	"You"	QQQ	
2026	September 25	"You" (feat. UMI)	QQQ	

== Concert tours ==
=== Headlining ===
- Fujii Kaze "Nan-Nan Show 2020" Help Ever Hurt Never (2020)
- Fujii Kaze "Help Ever Hall Tour" (2020–21)
- Fujii Kaze "Free" Live 2021 at Nissan Stadium (2021)
- Fujii Kaze "Help Ever Arena Tour" (2021)
- Fujii Kaze alone at home Tour 2022 (2022)
- Fujii Kaze "Love All Serve All" Stadium Live (2022)
- Fujii Kaze "Love All Arena Tour" (2022–23)
- Fujii Kaze and the Piano Asia Tour (2023)
- Fujii Kaze and the Piano U.S. Tour (2024)
- Fujii Kaze Stadium Live "Feelin' Good" (2024)
- Best Of Fujii Kaze 2020-2024 Asia Tour (2024)
- Fujii Kaze Europe Tour (2025)
- Fujii Kaze North America Tour (2025)

=== Others ===
- Live Di:ga Judgement (2018)
- Sanuki Rock Colosseum Monster Bash × I Radio786- (2019)
- Hiroshima Music Stadium -Haruban '19- (2019)
- Viva la Rock 2019 (2019)
- Sakar Sp-Ring (2019)
- Treasure05X 2019 -Heading for Tomorrow- (2019)
- Ohara☆brreak '19 summer (2019)
- Monster Bash 2019 (2019)
- Space Shower Sweet Love Shower (2019)
- FM802 Heavy Rotation Night supported by Spotify Early Noise (2020)
- Viva la Rock 2021 (2021)
- Viva la Rock 2021 Viva la J-Rock Anthems guest vocal (2021)
- Rising Sun Rock Festival 2022 in Ezo (In place of Vaundy) (2022)
- Roskilde Festival (2025)
- NN North Sea Jazz Festival (2025)
- Montreux Jazz Festival (2025)
- Lollapalooza (2025)
- Outside Lands (2025)
- Austin City Limits Music Festival (2025)
- Lollapalooza India (2026)
- Coachella (2026)

== Awards and nominations ==
List of awards and nominations received by Fujii Kaze
Award ceremony	Year	Category	Nominee(s) / Work(s)	Result	Ref.
CD Shop Awards	2021	Blue Prize	Help Ever Hurt Never	Won	
CD Shop Awards	2021	Chugoku Block Award	Help Ever Hurt Never	Won	
CD Shop Awards	2022	Best Live Video Works	Nan-Nan Show 2020	Won	
CD Shop Awards	2023	Red Prize	Love All Serve All	Won	
Japan Record Awards	2025	Special Album Award	Prema	Won	
MAMA Awards	2020	Best New Asian Artist Japan	Fujii Kaze	Won	
MEXT Awards	2022	Art Encouragement Prize for New Artist	Fujii Kaze	Won	
MTV Video Music Awards Japan	2020	Best R&B Video	"Nan-Nan"	Won	
MTV Video Music Awards Japan	2022	Best Visual Effects	"Damn"	Won	
Music Awards Japan	2025	Artist of the Year	Fujii Kaze	Nominated	
Music Awards Japan	2025	Best Japanese Song Artist	Fujii Kaze	Nominated	
Music Awards Japan	2025	Best Japanese R&B/Contemporary Artist	Fujii Kaze	Nominated	
Music Awards Japan	2025	Best Japanese Singer-Songwriter	Fujii Kaze	Won	
Music Awards Japan	2025	Album of the Year	Love All Serve All	Won	
Music Awards Japan	2025	Song of the Year	"Michiteyuku"	Nominated	
Music Awards Japan	2025	Best Japanese Song	"Michiteyuku"	Nominated	
Music Awards Japan	2025	Best Japanese Singer-Songwriter Song	"Michiteyuku"	Nominated	
Music Awards Japan	2025	Top Global Hit from Japan	"Shinunoga E-wa"	Nominated	
Music Awards Japan	2025	Best Japanese R&B/Contemporary Song	"Kirari" "Shinunoga E-wa" "Hana" "Michiteyuku"	Nominated	
Music Awards Japan	2025	Best Cross-Border Collaboration Song	"Feelin' Good"	Won	
Music Awards Japan	2025	Best of Listeners' Choice: Japanese Song	"Michiteyuku" "Hana"	Nominated	
Music Awards Japan	2026	Artist of the Year	Fujii Kaze	Nominated	
Music Awards Japan	2026	Best R&B/Contemporary Artist	Fujii Kaze	Won	
Music Awards Japan	2026	Album of the Year	Prema	Won	
Music Awards Japan	2026	Best R&B/Contemporary Song	"Hachikō"	Nominated	
Music Awards Japan	2026	Best R&B/Contemporary Song	"Prema"	Won	
Music Awards Japan	2026	Best Long-Charting Song	"Michiteyuku"	Nominated	
Music Awards Japan	2026	Best Long-Charting Album	Help Ever Hurt Never	Won	
Music Awards Japan	2026	Best Long-Charting Album	Love All Serve All	Nominated	
Music Awards Japan	2026	Best Music Video	"Hachikō"	Nominated	
Music Awards Japan	2026	Best of Listeners' Choice: Japanese Song	"Prema"	Nominated	
Music Pen Club Awards	2021	Best New Artist (Popular Music)	Fujii Kaze	Won	
Space Shower Music Awards	2021	Best Breakthrough Artist	Fujii Kaze	Won	
Space Shower Music Awards	2021	Best Conceptual Video	"Seishun-Sick"	Won	
Space Shower Music Awards	2022	Best Solo Artist	Fujii Kaze	Won	
Space Shower Music Awards	2022	Best Conceptual Live	Fujii Kaze	Won	
Space Shower Music Awards	2022	People's Choice	Fujii Kaze	Won	

== Tie-ins ==
=== 2021 ===
- 'Tabiji' for a TV drama series "Nijiiro Carte " (にじいろカルテ/ Niji Village Clinic)
- 'Kirari' for new Honda Vezel TV ad
- 'Moeyo' for mobile phone Google Pixel TV ad

=== 2022 ===
- 'The sun and the moon' for a documentary movie 'Tokyo 2020 Olympics: Side A'
- 'grace' for TV ad of NTT docomo's 'docomo future project'

=== 2023 ===
- 'Beat It' (Cover of Michael Jackson) for a TV program 'まつも to なかい (Matsumo to Nakai)'
- 'Workin' Hard' for FIBA Basketball World Cup 2023 (Limited to broadcasting on TV Asahi /Nippon TV)
- ''Garden' for TV ad of Nature Lab's 'Laundrin'
- "Hana" for a TV drama series "Ichiban Sukina Hana" (いちばん好きな花）

=== 2024 ===
- "Michi Teyu Ku" (Overflowing) for a movie "Shigatsu Ni Nareba Kanojo Wa" (四月になれば彼女は/April Come She Will)
- "Workin' Hard" for TV ad of dip 'Let's get started!' Ver.
- "Feelin' Go(o)d" for TV ad of Laundrin

=== 2025 ===
- "masshiro (pure white)" for TV ad of I LOHAS
