= Hitsujibungaku =

Japanese rock band formed 2012

- Origin: Tokyo, Japan
- Genres: Alternative rock
- Years active: 2011–present
- Label: Sony Music Japan
- Members: Moeka Shiotsuka; Yurika Kasai
- Past members: Shino; Wako; Hiroa Fukuda
- Website: www.hitsujibungaku.info

Hitsujibungaku (Japanese: 羊文学; lit. 'sheep literature') is a Japanese alternative rock band formed by Moeka Shiotsuka (vocals, guitar, songwriting) and Yurika Kasai (bass). Drummer Hiroa Fukuda joined in 2015, until his departure 10 years later.

== Career ==
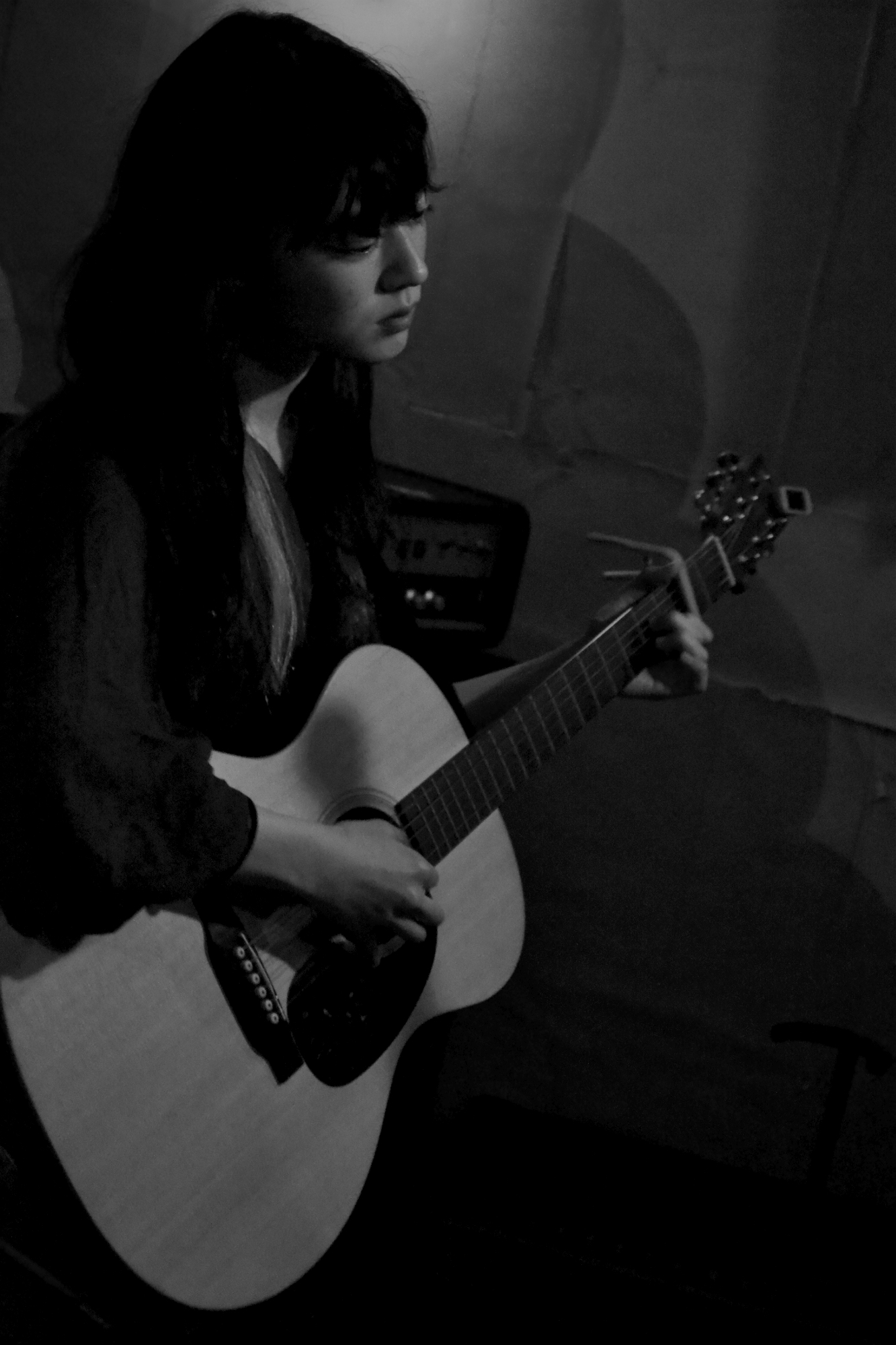
Moeka Shiotsuka in 2018

Moeka Shiotsuka formed Hitsujibungaku in 2011 at age 15, during her first year of high school. The band worked around their school schedules, recording primarily during breaks and vacations.

The band's drummer, Hiroa Fukuda, came from a different background. By his own admission, he was never particularly invested in academics and went to college mainly to play music in campus bands. Before joining Hitsujibungaku in 2015, he played as a backup drummer for Regal Lily.

The band's bassist, Yurika Kasai, first encountered Hitsujibungaku when both performed at the same school music festival - she as a guitarist in another act. When the band posted a bassist wanted ad in 2017, Kasai was the only applicant but Hiroa recalled how her melodic style enhanced their sound from the very first rehearsal.

The band released their debut album To the youth (若者たちへ, Wakamono-tachi e) in 2018, featuring "Step" with a music video directed by Shunji Iwai. Their second album, Powers, followed in 2020. In 2021, they wrote and performed "Hikaru Toki" (When the Light Shines) as the opening theme for The Heike Story.

In April 2022, they released their third album, Our hope, which went on to win the Blue Grand Prix at the 2023 CD Shop Awards.

The band's profile continued to rise when they contributed "More Than Words" as the ending theme for the Shibuya Incident Arc of Jujutsu Kaisen season 2 in September 2023. They rounded out the year with their fourth album, 12 Hugs (Like Butterflies), released in December.

In May 2024, Fukuda announced he would be taking a break from performing, with the band continuing to use support members for live shows.

The following month, on June 6 (Japan's Sheep Day), they released their version of the Shaun the Sheep theme song "Life's a Treat."

In July 2024, Hitsujibungaku released "Burning" as the ending theme for season two of Oshi no Ko. On March 19, 2025 the music video for “Burning,” directed by Umi Ishihara, won Best Rock Video at the MTV Video Music Awards Japan.

The band made their U.S. debut with a performance in Honolulu on December 14th, 2024 and they subsequently toured the US west coast in April 2025. Drummer Yuna (formerly from Chai) filled in for Fukuda during the tour.

On January 20, 2025, Hitsujibungaku released the song “Koe.” On March 28, Hitsujibungaku released the song “Map of the Future 2025.”

They released their new album Don’t Laugh It Off on October 8, 2025. Later that month, Hitsujibungaku went on its first European tour with stops in Paris, Nijmegen, Cologne, Berlin, Warsaw, Vienna, and London.

== Band members ==
=== Current members ===
- Moeka Shiotsuka (塩塚モエカ) – lead vocals, guitars (2011–present)
- Yurika Kasai (河西ゆりか) – bass guitar, backing vocals (2017–present)

=== Former members ===
- Wako (わあこ) – bass guitar (2011–2016)
- Shino (しの) – drums, percussion (2011–2015)
- Hiroa Fukuda (フクダヒロア) – drums, percussion (2015–2025)

== Discography ==
=== Studio albums ===
List of studio albums, showing selected details and chart positions
Title	Details	Peak chart positions	
Title	Details	JPN	JPN Hot
Dear Youths, (若者たちへ)	Released: July 25, 2018; Label: Felicity; Formats: CD, LP, digital download, streaming	—	—
Powers	Released: December 9, 2020; Label: F.C.L.S.; Formats: CD+DVD, LP, digital download, streaming	32	32
Our Hope	Released: April 20, 2022; Label: F.C.L.S.; Formats: CD, CD+Blu-ray, LP, digital download, streaming	5	5
12 Hugs (Like Butterflies)	Released: December 6, 2023; Label: F.C.L.S.; Formats: CD, CD+Blu-ray, digital download, streaming	10	8
Don't Laugh It Off	Released: October 8, 2025; Label: F.C.L.S.; Formats: CD, CD+Blu-ray, digital download, streaming	9	11
"—" denotes releases that did not chart.

=== Live albums ===
List of live albums, showing selected details and chart positions
Title	Details	Peak chart positions
Title	Details	JPN Hot
Hitsujibungaku Tour 2023 "If I Were an Angel," 2023.10.03	Released: January 31, 2024; Label: F.C.L.S.; Formats: Digital download, streaming	93

=== Extended plays ===
List of extended plays, showing selected details and chart positions
Title	Details	Peak chart positions	
Title	Details	JPN	JPN Hot
Tonneru wo Nuketara (トンネルを抜けたら)	Released: October 4, 2017; Label: Felicity; Formats: CD, digital download, streaming	—	—
A Short Trip to the Orange-Chocolate-House (オレンジチョコレートハウスまでの道のり)	Released: February 7, 2018; Label: Felicity; Formats: CD, digital download, streaming	—	—
Kirameki (きらめき)	Released: July 3, 2018; Label: Felicity; Formats: CD, LP, digital download, streaming	—	—
Zawameki (ざわめき)	Released: February 5, 2020; Label: Felicity; Formats: CD, LP, digital download, streaming	—	73
You Love	Released: August 25, 2021; Label: F.C.L.S.; Formats: CD, digital download, streaming	42	34
"—" denotes releases that did not chart.

=== Singles ===
List of singles, showing year released, selected chart positions, certifications, and album name
Title	Year	Peak chart positions		Certifications	Album
Title	Year	JPN	JPN Hot	Certifications	Album
"1999"	2018	—	—	RIAJ: Gold (st.)	Powers
"Sabaku no Kimi he" (砂漠のきみへ)	2020	—	—		Powers
"Girls"	2020	—	—		Powers
"Ginga Tetsudō no Yoru" (銀河鉄道の夜)	2020	—	—		Non-album single
"Lucky" (ラッキー)	2021	—	—		Our Hope
"Mayoiga" (マヨイガ)	2021	—	—		Our Hope
"Hikaru Toki" (光るとき)	2022	—	—		Our Hope
"Oh Hey" (with Lücy)	2022	—	—		Non-album singles
"Seikatsu" (生活)	2022	—	—		Non-album singles
"Kazeninare" (風になれ)	2023	—	—		Non-album singles
"Eien no Blue" (永遠のブルー)	2023	—	—		12 Hugs (Like Butterflies)
"Fool"	2023	—	—		12 Hugs (Like Butterflies)
"More Than Words"	2023	15	18	RIAJ: Platinum (st.)	12 Hugs (Like Butterflies)
"Tears"	2024	—	—		Don't Laugh It Off
"Shaun the Sheep (Life's a Treat)"	2024	—	—		Non-album single
"Burning"	2024	35	82		Don't Laugh It Off
"Koe" (声)	2025	—	64		Don't Laugh It Off
"Map of the Future 2025" (未来地図2025)	2025	—	—		Don't Laugh It Off
"Mild Days"	2025	31	—		Don't Laugh It Off
"Haru no Arashi" (春の嵐)	2025	—	—		Don't Laugh It Off
"Feel"	2025	31	—		Don't Laugh It Off
"Dogs"	2026	—	—		Non-album singles
"Keep Walking"	2026	—	—		Non-album singles
"—" denotes releases that did not chart.

=== Promotional singles ===
List of promotional singles, showing year released, selected chart positions, and album name
Title	Year	Peak chart positions	Album
Title	Year	JPN Hot	Album
"Muffler" (マフラー)	2018	—	A Short Trip to the Orange-Chocolate-House
"Drama" (ドラマ)	2018	—	Dear Youths,
"Romance" (ロマンス)	2019	—	Kirameki
"Ningen-datta" (人間だった)	2019	—	Zawameki
"Aimai de Īyo" (あいまいでいいよ)	2020	75	Powers
"Mother"	2020	—	Powers
"Yoru wo Koete" (夜をこえて)	2021	—	You Love
"OOPArts"	2022	—	Our Hope
"Go!!!"	2023	—	12 Hugs (Like Butterflies)
"Doll"	2025	—	Don't Laugh It Off
"—" denotes releases that did not chart.

== Awards and nominations ==
Year	Award ceremony	Category	Nominee / Work	Result	Ref.
2021	13th CD Shop Awards	Finalist Award	Powers	Won	
2022	Space Shower Music Awards	Best Alternative Act	Hitsujibungaku	Nominated	
2023	15th CD Shop Awards	Grand Prix – Blue	Our Hope	Won	
2025	11th Anime Trending Awards	Ending Theme Song of the Year	"Burning"	Won	
2025	9th Crunchyroll Anime Awards	Best Ending Sequence	"Burning"	Nominated	
2025	MTV Video Music Awards Japan	Best Rock Video	"Burning"	Won	
2025	Reiwa Anisong Awards	Artist Song Award	"Burning"	Nominated	
2025	Music Awards Japan	Best Japanese Alternative Artist	Hitsujibungaku	Won	
2025	Music Awards Japan	Best Japanese Alternative Song	"Burning"	Nominated	
2025	Music Awards Japan	Best Japanese Alternative Song	"More Than Words"	Won	
2025	Music Awards Japan	Special Award: Radio Best Radio-Break Song	"More Than Words"	Nominated	
2026	Music Awards Japan	Best Japanese Alternative Artist	Hitsujibungaku	Won	
2026	Music Awards Japan	Best Japanese Alternative Song	"Koe"	Won	
2026	Music Awards Japan	Best Dance/Electronic Song	"More Than Words (Miso Extra Remix)"	Nominated	
