= Hana (Fujii Kaze song) =

Single by Fujii Kaze
- Language: Japanese
- Released: October 13, 2023
- Length: 4:06
- Label: Universal Sigma; Hehn
- Songwriter: Fujii Kaze
- Producer: A. G. Cook

Fujii Kaze singles chronology
"Workin' Hard" (2023)	"Hana" (2023)	"Michiteyuku" (2024)

Music video
- "Hana" on YouTube

"Hana" (花; lit. 'Flower') is a song by Japanese singer-songwriter Fujii Kaze, released as a single on October 13, 2023, through Universal Sigma and Hehn Records. It was written by Fujii and produced by A. G. Cook. The song was used as the theme song for the drama series My Beloved Flower. It reached the top ten on the Japan Hot 100. "Hana" was later included on Fujii's third studio album Prema as a bonus track.

== Background ==
Fujii wrote the song during his first Asian tour, and described it as a song about "searching for the flower within, and trusting in it", also likening it to flowers blooming and dying just as people do. The track was utilized as the theme song for the Japanese drama series My Beloved Flower (いちばんすきな花; Ichiban Suki na Hana).

== Music video ==
The song's music video was directed by Mess and released on November 30, 2023. It was filmed near Broken Hill in New South Wales, Australia, and depicts Fujii walking along a road pulling an open casket filled with flowers that another version of himself is lying in. The casket is then placed onto the back of a car as Fujii drives across the desert with it and arrives at the site of a funeral, where a framed portrait of Fujii is shown singing. The version of Fujii that was lying in the casket then arises and dances with several shrouded mourners at the funeral, first during the daytime, then at night around a fire. When it becomes morning, the dancers and Fujii turn into dust that blows away. The video was said to "symboliz[e] life's transient nature".

== Accolades ==
Awards and nominations for "Hana"
Ceremony	Year	Award	Result	Ref.
Music Awards Japan	2025	Best Japanese R&B/Contemporary Song	Nominated	
Music Awards Japan	2025	Best of Listeners' Choice: Japanese Song	Nominated	

== Track listing ==
- Digital EP
1. "Hana" – 4:06
2. "Hana" (instrumental) – 4:06
3. "Hana" (ballad) – 4:07
4. "Hana" (demo) – 4:07

== Credits and personnel ==
- Fujii Kaze – vocals, songwriter, synthesizer
- Ryan McDiarmid – drums
- A. G. Cook – producer
- Masahito Kamori – recording, mixing
- Tsubasa Yamazaki – mastering

== Charts ==
=== Weekly charts ===
Weekly chart performance for "Hana"
Chart (2023)	Peak position
Global Excl. US (Billboard)	122
Japan (Japan Hot 100)	6
Japan Combined Singles (Oricon)	6

=== Year-end charts ===
2023 year-end chart performance for "Hana"
Chart (2023)	Position
Japan Download Songs (Billboard Japan)	50

2024 year-end chart performance for "Hana"
Chart (2024)	Position
Japan (Japan Hot 100)	34

2025 year-end chart performance for "Hana"
Chart (2025)	Position
Japan (Japan Hot 100)	86

== Certifications ==
Certifications for "Hana"
Region	Certification	Certified units/sales
Japan (RIAJ) Digital	Gold	100,000^{*}
Streaming
Japan (RIAJ)	2× Platinum	200,000,000^{†}
^{*} Sales figures based on certification alone.^{†} Streaming-only figures based on certification alone.
