= Andymori (album) =

Studio album by Andymori
- Released: February 4, 2009
- Recorded: 2008
- Genre: Alternative rock, punk rock
- Length: 31:47
- Label: Youth Records

Andymori chronology
Andy to Rock to Bengal Tora to Whisky (2008)	Andymori (2009)	Fanfare to Nekkyō (2010)

Andymori is Andymori's self-titled full-length debut album, released on February 4, 2009. It was released simultaneously with a vinyl EP with tracks from the album, "Tokai o Sugoi Hayasa de Hashiru Bengal Tora" (都会をすごい速さで走るベンガルトラ, Bengal Tiger Running Through Town with Great Speed).

Unsigned singer Predawn contributed to chorus vocals in the track "Aoi Sora."

== Background ==
The album was preceded by four months by the EP "Andy to Rock to Bengal Tora to Whisky" (アンディとロックとベンガルトラとウィスキー, Andy, Rock, Bengal Tiger and Whisky). Three tracks from the EP, "Bengal Tora to Whisky," "Everything Is My Guitar" and "Follow Me" were later put onto the album.

== Promotion ==
Four tracks from the album had music videos: "Aoi Sora," "Everything Is My Guitar," "Follow Me," and "Life Is Party." All were directed by Masakazu Fukatsu (except for "Life Is Party," which was directed by Fukatsu and Shōji Shinya, one of the founders of Youth Records). "Follow Me" was later nominated for the Best New Artist video for the 2010 Space Shower Music Video Awards.

== Track listing ==
All songs written by Sohey Oyamada. All songs performed by Andymori.

No.	Title	Length
1.	"Follow Me"	2:32
2.	"Everything Is My Guitar"	2:27
3.	"Mongoloid Blues (モンゴロイドブルース, Mongoroido Burūsu)"	2:42
4.	"Aoi Sora (青い空, Blue Sky)"	2:58
5.	"Happy End (ハッピーエンド, Happī Endo)"	3:47
6.	"Tokai o Hashiru Neko (都会を走る猫, Cat Running Through Town)"	2:45
7.	"Boku ga Hakujin Dattara (僕が白人だったら, If I Were White)"	1:54
8.	"Bengal Tora to Whisky (ベンガルトラとウィスキー, Bengal Tiger and Whisky)"	2:38
9.	"Dare ni mo Mitsukerarenai Hoshi ni Naretara (誰にも見つけられない星になれたら, If I became a Star Nobody Could Find)"	3:08
10.	"Sunset Cruising (サンセットクルージング, Sansetto Kurūjingu)"	1:43
11.	"Life Is Party"	3:47
12.	"Sugoi Hayasa (すごい速さ, Great Speed)"	1:26

== Japan Sales Rankings ==
Release	Chart	Peak position	First week sales	Sales total	Chart run
February 4, 2009	Oricon Daily Albums Chart				
February 4, 2009	Oricon Weekly Albums Chart	162	968	1,462	2 weeks
February 4, 2009	Oricon Yearly Albums Chart				
