= Plenty (band) =

Japanese band

plenty
- Origin: Ibaraki, Japan
- Genres: Indie rock, indie pop, emo, alternative rock
- Years active: 2004–2017, 2026–present
- Label: Headphone Music Label
- Members: Fumiya Enuma (vocals, guitar); Noriaki Nitta (bass); Kenta Furuichi (drums)
- Past members: Itta Nakamura (drums); Hiroki Yoshioka (drums)
- Website: plenty-web.net

Plenty (stylized as plenty) is a Japanese indie rock band formed in Ibaraki, 2004. The band was previously signed to the Headphone Music Label. The band officially disbanded in 2017. On March 1st, 2026, plenty announced their official return.

== Background ==
Plenty was formed in 2004 in Ibaraki Prefecture by guitarist Fumiya Enuma, bassist Noriaki Nitta, drummer Hiroki Yoshioka, and a female schoolmate as the vocalist. However, the female schoolmate left the band upon graduating junior high school, leaving Enuma as the main vocalist.

In 2008, the band relocated to Tokyo where drummer Yoshioka's parents' home became their main practice spot. In August, the band began performing in live houses and made their first public appearance at Rockin'On Inc.'s "Countdown Japan 08/09". Plenty debuted their first album "Haikei. Minasama" in October 2009 and held their first nationwide tour in January 2010.

On July 30, 2011, the band's drummer, Yoshioka, announced his withdrawal from Plenty. In August 2014, new drummer Itta Nakamura joined the band as a formal member.

The band gets their name from a parfait shop in Chōshi, Chiba.

In 2017 it was announced that they will embark on a one-man tour, titled "plenty Last Tour Aoki Hibi", starting in June. Following this, in September, they plan to disband officially.

After plenty Fumiya Enuma started a solo career in 2018 with several concerts, tours and releases. His first one-man show took place at LIQUIDROOM in September 2018. His first album "#1" has been released on November 7, 2018. His second album "それは流線型" followed on November 6, 2019. On February 26, 2020, he released a remix album called "#1 -another dimension-". Unlike plenty his music can be described as mostly instrumental, experimental, minimalist and atmospheric ambient music. In May 2023 he founded the band DOGADOGA (also known as ドガ) with other musicians. The band mixes various genres like Punk, Dub, Funk, Latin, Jazz and others. The original line up included former andymori members Hiroshi Fujiwara (on bass guitar) and Kenji Okayama (on percussion, tambourine, cow bell and congas). The latter however left the band in June 2024.

Drummer Itta Nakamura moved to Berlin shortly after the disbandment. He has continued his career as a drummer and has released a lot of music through Bandcamp. His projects include: "Itta Nakamura & João Clemente", their improvisational project "Profound Whatever", "Street Fight" where André Pontífice joins them, "Bending bodies" and "Novatron", an improvisational project with Tatsumi Ryusui on guitar. All of his projects influenced by noise rock, drone, hardcore, and ambient.

In March of 2026, after various months of Enuma teasing two greatest hits albums: outside (release on January 21st, 2026) & inside (set to release March 18th 2026), the first of March, plenty announced: plenty Restart (re:birth) and their official return to music. With Noriaki Nitta returning to play bass and the addition of Enuma's long time recurrent drummer in multiple projects, Kenta Furuichi.

== Members ==
Current members

- 江沼 郁弥 (Fumiya Enuma, born September 24, 1988) – vocals, guitar (2004–2017)
- 新田 紀彰 (Noriaki Nitta, born April 8, 1988) – bass (2004–2017)
- 古市健太 (Furuichi Kenta) – drums (2026–present)

Past members

- 中村 一太 (Itta Nakamura, born November 20, 1988) – drums from ex. The Cabs / Peelingwards / Dry as Dust (2014–2017)

Additional members

- 平間 幹央 (Mikio Hirama, born May 5, 1976) – guitar from Tokyo Jihen
- 中畑 大樹 (Daiki Nakahata, born July 25, 1974) – drums from Syrup16g / YakYakYak / Vola and the Oriental Machine

== Discography ==
=== Albums ===
- "plenty" (February 15, 2012)
- "this" (May 29, 2013)
- "inochi no katachi" (いのちのかたち, The Shape of Life) (October 7, 2015)
- "life" (September 21, 2016)

=== Mini albums ===
- "Haikei. Minasama" (拝啓。皆さま, Dear Everyone) (October 21, 2009)
- "Risōteki na Boku no Sekai" (理想的なボクの世界, My Ideal World) (April 21, 2010)
- "r e ( construction )" (December 4, 2013)
- "Sora kara Furu Ichioku no Hoshi" (空から降る一億の星, A Million Stars Falling From the Sky) (November 5, 2014)

=== EPs ===
- "Hito to no Kyori no Hakari Kata / Saikin Dōnano? / Ningen Sokkuri" (人との距離のはかりかた/最近どうなの?/人間そっくり) (January 12, 2011)
- "Machiawase no Tochū / Owarinai Dokokae / Sora ga Waratteru" (待ち合わせの途中/終わりない何処かへ/空が笑ってる) (May 25, 2011)
- "Katamuita Sora / Nōtenki Biyori / Hitotsu, Sayonara" (傾いた空/能天気日和/ひとつ、さよなら) (August 1, 2012)
- "ACTOR / DRIP / ETERNAL" (November 7, 2012)
- "Kore Kara / Sensei no Susume / good bye" (これから / 先生のススメ / good bye) (January 29, 2014)

=== Singles ===
- "Taion" (体温, Temperature) (April 18, 2015)
- "Yoi Asa wo, Itoshii Hito / Sayonara Yori, Yasashii Kotoba" (よい朝を、いとしいひと／さよならより、優しいことば) (July 22, 2015)

=== Sound Film Track ===
- "Ai to Iu" (あいという, To Call It Love) (December 7, 2011)

=== Demo ===
- "Kōkai" (後悔, Regrets) (2009)
