= Andymori =

Japanese indie rock band

- Origin: Japan
- Genres: Indie rock, Alternative rock, Pop rock
- Years active: 2007–2014
- Labels: Youth Records; 1994 Co., Ltd. Faith Music Entertainment
- Members: Sōhei Oyamada (小山田壮平) (vocals+guitar); Hiroshi Fujiwara (藤原寛) (bass); Kenji Okayama (岡山健二) (drums)
- Past members: Hiroki Gotō (後藤大樹) (drums)
- Website: andymori Official Site

Andymori (アンディモリ, andimori) (stylised as "andymori") was a Japanese indie rock band, signed to Youth Records. They debuted in 2007 with the EP Andy to Rock to Bengal Tora to Whisky. The band's name came from merging Andy Warhol and the phrase memento mori.

== Biography ==
Andymori first formed in 2007, performing live at live houses in the Tokyo area. Their first big event was the Fuji Rock Festival in 2008, where they performed on the new artist stage. The band released their first EP "Andy to Rock to Bengal Tora to Whisky" in October 2008, as the first new artist signed to Youth Records. This was followed by their full-length album in February 2009, Andymori. The lead single, "Follow Me," was chosen as an iTunes Single of the Week free download song in January.

The band performed at many of the major summer festivals in 2009, such as Rock in Japan and Summer Sonic. In October, the band held their first one-man live, and featured on the 10 year anniversary tribute album for Quruli.

In 2010, the band released their second album, Fanfare to Nekkyō. Prior to its release, they were picked as one of the iTunes Japan "Sound of 2010" break-through artists, and their video for "Follow Me" was nominated for the Best New Artist award for the 2010 Space Shower Music Video Awards. The album has so far reached No. 9 on the Oricon albums daily charts.

The band performed overseas for the first time in 2010, with four concerts across Canada in May 2010 at the first Next Music from Tokyo!!! concert event.

Hiroki Gotō performed his last live show with the band on November 27, at Club Seata in Kichijôji. Sôhei Oyamada said in a radio show held in Ôsaka (MUSIC FREAKS FM802) that Hiroki asked for "Life Is Party" to be on the setlist for the show because it is his favorite song. The new drummer was announced to be Okayama Kenji (岡山健二), with his first live show held on December 2, 2010, at Shimokitazawa Shelter.

In 2014, it was announced that Andymori would break up after seven years. The band released its final album, Uchū no Hate wa Kono Me no Mae ni , on June 26 of that year, and perform a tour from July until September. The final date of the tour was held at the Nippon Budokan on September 24.

Ever since the disbanding, their vocalist Souhei Okayama has started a solo project under his name. His music can be described as folk/indie music.

In May 2023 former bassist Hiroshi Fujiwara and former drummer Kenji Okayama founded the band DOGADOGA (also known as ドガ) with other musicians, including the former vocalist of Japanese indie-rock band plenty. The band mixes various genres like Punk, Dub, Funk, Latin, Jazz and others. Kenji Okayama (percussion, tambourine, cow bell and congas in the band) left the band in June 2024.

== Discography ==
=== Albums ===
List of studio albums, with selected chart positions, sales figures and certifications
Title	Album details	Peak chart positions	Sales
Title	Album details	JPN	Sales
Andymori	Released: February 4, 2009; Label: Youth Records (XQFQ-1112); Format: CD, digital download	162	1,500
Fanfare to Nekkyō (ファンファーレと熱狂; "Fanfare and Enthusiasm")	Released: February 3, 2010; Label: Youth Records (XQFQ-1113); Formats: CD, digital download	23	14,000
Kakumei (革命; "Revolution")	Released: June 8, 2011; Label: Youth Records (XQFQ-1114); Formats: CD, digital download	12	17,000
Hikari (光; "Light")	Released: May 2, 2012; Label: Youth Records (XQFQ-1115); Formats: CD, digital download	8	14,000
Uchū no Hate wa Kono Me no Mae ni (宇宙の果てはこの目の前に; "The Edge of the Universe Is Before These Eyes")	Released: June 26, 2013; Label: Youth Records (XQFQ-1116); Formats: CD, digital download	TBA	TBA

=== Extended plays ===
Title	Album details
Andy to Rock to Bengal Tora to Whisky (アンディとロックとベンガルトラとウィスキー; "Andy, Rock, Bengal Tiger and Whisky")	Released: October 8, 2008; Label: Youth Records (XQFQ-1111); Formats: CD, digital download
Tokai o Sugoi Hayasa de Hashiru Bengal Tora (都会をすごい速さで走るベンガルトラ; "Bengal Tiger Running Through Town with Great Speed")	Released: February 4, 2009; Label: Youth Records (XQFQ-4001); Formats: Vinyl

== Singles ==
Title	Year	Billboard Japan Hot 100	Album
"1984"	2010	40	Fanfare to Nekkyō
"Kyōdai" (兄弟; "Brothers")	2011	—	—
"Kakumei"	2011	100	Kakumei
"Hikari"	2012	85	Hikari
"Uchū no Hate wa Kono Me no Mae ni"	2013	TBA	Uchū no Hate wa Kono Me no Mae ni

=== DVDs ===
- Bokutachi andymori: Hibiya Yagai Daiongakudō (ぼくたちアンディモリ ～日比谷野外大音楽堂; "We Are andymori: Hibiya Great Open-Air Concert Hall") (2010)
- Aki no Rakuen Tour 2011.10.07 Studio Coast (秋の楽園ツアー; "Autumn Paradise Tour") (2012)
