= Elmiene =

British singer-songwriter (born 2001)

- Born: Abdala Elamin; 1 July 2001 (age 25); Frankfurt, Germany
- Origin: Oxford, England
- Genres: Neo-soul; R&B
- Occupations: Singer; songwriter; musician
- Instruments: Vocals; keyboard
- Years active: 2021-present
- Labels: Polydor, Def Jam
- Website: el-mean.com

Abdala Elamin (born 1 July 2001), known professionally as Elmiene, is a British-Sudanese singer from Oxford. He placed fifth in the BBC Sound of 2024 poll and was nominated for the Brit Award for Rising Star in 2025.

== Life and career ==
Elmiene was born in Frankfurt, Germany, to Sudanese parents who had moved there in the late 1990s. When he was around five years old, his family moved to Oxford, England.

Elmiene started his career in 2021 after going viral from an Instagram post of him singing D'Angelo's Untitled (How Does It Feel) song.

Elmiene released his single "Useless (Without You)" on August 14, 2025. His mixtape Heat the Streets was released on September 5.

== Personal life ==
Elmiene is a Muslim. He graduated from Bournemouth University in 2022 and majored in Creative Writing with a specialty in Poetry

== Discography ==
Studio albums

- Sounds for Someone (2026)

Mixtapes

- Heat the Streets (2025)

Extended plays

- El-Mean (2023)
- Marking My Time (2023)
- Live at RAK Studios (2024)
- Anyway I Can (2024)
- For the Deported (2024)
- This Is the Remix (2025)
- Heat the Streets Some Mo’ (2025)

Live albums

- Live from 525 (2024)
- Live from Brussels (2025)

Singles

- "Golden" (2021)
- "Why (Spare Me Tears)" (2022)
- "Endless No Mores" (2023)
- "Mad at Fire" (2023)
- "Mama" (2023)
- "Marking My Time" (2024)
- "Someday" (2024)
- "Lover, You Should've Come Over" (2023)
- "Crystal Tears" (2024)
- "Sweetness" (2024)
- "Light Work" (2024)
- "Anyways" (2024)
- "Useless (Without You)" (2025)
- "Cry Against the Wind" (2025)
- "Reclusive" (2026)
- "Honour" (2026)
- "Saviour" (2026)
- "Comets + Gold" (with Fujii Kaze) (2026)

== Awards and nominations ==
Organisation	Year	Category	Result
BBC	2024	Sound of 2024	Fifth
Brit Awards	2025	Rising Star	Nominated
