= Fanfare to Nekkyō =

Studio album by Andymori
- Released: February 3, 2010
- Recorded: 2009
- Genres: Alternative rock, punk rock
- Length: 36:04
- Label: Youth Records

Andymori chronology
Andymori (2009)	Fanfare to Nekkyō (2010)

Singles from Fanfare to Nekkyō
- 1. "City Lights" Released: January 7, 2010 (digital download); 2. "1984" Released: February 2010 (radio single)

Fanfare to Nekkyō (ファンファーレと熱狂, Fanfāre to Nekkyō; Fanfare and Wild Enthusiasm) is Andymori's second album, released on February 3, 2010. The title comes from a line from the first track, "1984."

== Promotion ==
"City Lights" was released on 7 January to iTunes, the Recochoku full-download store and the Space Shower music store. A music video for this track was made, directed by Shōji Shinya.

"1984" was released as a radio single in February 2010, reaching #40 on the Billboard Japan Hot 100. A music video for the track was filmed, airing exclusively on Space Shower. It is their first to be filmed with director Kazuyoshi Iijima, and first to not feature input from Shōji Shinya.

== Track listing ==
All songs written by Sohey Oyamada. All songs performed by Andymori.

No.	Title	Length
1.	"1984"	4:46
2.	"City Lights"	3:03
3.	"Zutto Groupie (ずっとグルーピー, More and More Groupies)"	1:48
4.	"Boku ga Hakubishin Dattara (僕がハクビシンだったら, If I Were a Civet)"	1:31
5.	"16"	3:46
6.	"Beautiful Celebrity (ビューティフルセレブリティー, Byūtifuru Sereburitī)"	3:44
7.	"Transit in Thailand"	1:53
8.	"Crazy Claimer (クレイジークレーマー, Kureijī Kurēmā)"	2:09
9.	"Nutmeg (ナツメグ, Natsumegu)"	0:28
10.	"Baghdad no Body Count (バグダッドのボディーカウント, Baghdad Body Count)"	2:19
11.	"Orange Train (オレンジトレイン, Orenji Torein)"	4:51
12.	"Sawasdeeclap Your Hands"	3:34
13.	"Glorious Keitora (グロリアス軽トラ, Glorious Light Truck)"	2:12

== Japan Sales Rankings ==
Release	Chart	Peak position	First week sales	Sales total
February 3, 2010	Oricon Daily Albums Chart	9		
February 3, 2010	Oricon Weekly Albums Chart	23	5,400	14,000
