= Matsuri (song) =

Single by Fujii Kaze

from the album Love All Serve All
- Language: Japanese
- Released: March 18, 2022
- Genre: J-pop
- Length: 3:45
- Label: Universal Sigma; Hehn
- Songwriter: Fujii Kaze
- Producer: Yaffle

Fujii Kaze singles chronology
"Ignite" (2021)	"Matsuri" (2022)	"Damn" (2022)

Music video
- "Matsuri" on YouTube

Matsuri (まつり; lit. 'Festival') is a song by Japanese singer-songwriter Fujii Kaze. The song was performed at the NHK Tiny Desk Concerts Japan.

== Background ==
The song was teased on March 16, 2022.

== Composition ==
The song has been described as a "happy-go-lucky song".

== Personnel ==
Musicians

- Fujii Kaze – vocals, piano
- Sho Ogawa – electric guitar
- Tamaki Hikari – wood flute

Technical

- Fujii Kaze – songwriter
- Yaffle – producer
- Masahito Komori – recording engineer, mixing engineer

== Charts ==
Chart performance for "Matsuri"
Chart (2022–2024)	Peak position
Japan (Japan Hot 100)	10
Japan Combined Singles (Oricon)	24
Vietnam (Vietnam Hot 100)	48

== Certifications ==
Certifications for "Matsuri"
Region	Certification	Certified units/sales
Streaming
Japan (RIAJ)	Platinum	100,000,000^{†}
^{†} Streaming-only figures based on certification alone.
