= Love All Serve All =

Studio album by Fujii Kaze
- Released: March 23, 2022
- Genre: J-pop
- Length: 46:18
- Labels: Hehn; Universal Sigma
- Producer: Yaffle

Fujii Kaze chronology
| Help Ever Hurt Never (2020) | Love All Serve All (2022) | Best of Fujii Kaze 2020–2024 (2024) |

Singles from Love All Serve All
- 1. "Hedemo Ne-Yo" Released: October 10, 2020; 2. "Seishun Sick" Released: October 10, 2020; 3. "Tabiji" Released: January 3, 2021; 4. "Kirari" Released: May 3, 2021; 5. "Mo-Eh-Yo (Ignite)" Released: September 4, 2021; 6. "Matsuri" Released: March 20, 2022; 7. "Damn" Released: September 30, 2022

Love All Serve All (stylized in all caps) is the second studio album by Japanese singer-songwriter Fujii Kaze. It was released on March 23, 2022, through Hehn Records and Universal Sigma. Six singles were released prior to the album, those being "Matsuri", "Hedemo Ne-Yo", "Seishun Sick", "Tabiji", "Mo-Eh-Yo (Ignite)", and "Kirari". "Kirari" was used in commercials to promote the Honda Vezel. The first edition of the album was released alongside an album of covers titled Love All Cover All. Love All Serve All peaked atop both the Oricon Albums Chart and the Combined Chart. It was certified platinum by the RIAJ. It won the red award at the 2023 CD Shop Awards, and Album of the Year at the 2025 Music Awards Japan.

== Track listing ==
=== Regular edition ===
All tracks are written by Fujii Kaze, and produced by Yaffle.

Love All Serve All track listing
| No. | Title | Length |
|---|---|---|
| 1. | "Kirari" (きらり) | 3:47 |
| 2. | "Matsuri" (まつり) | 3:45 |
| 3. | "Hedemo Ne-Yo" (へでもねーよ; LASA edit) | 3:08 |
| 4. | "Yaba" (やば。) | 4:11 |
| 5. | "Mo-Eh-Yo (Ignite)" (燃えよ) | 4:37 |
| 6. | "Garden" (ガーデン) | 3:49 |
| 7. | "Damn" | 4:19 |
| 8. | "Lonely Rhapsody" (ロンリーラプソディ) | 4:46 |
| 9. | "Bye for Now" (それでは、; "Soredewa,") | 3:50 |
| 10. | "Seishun Sick" ("青春病"; "Seishunbyou") | 5:24 |
| 11. | "Tabiji" (旅路) | 4:37 |
| Total length: | | 46:18 |

=== Limited edition and digital release bonus ===
Included as a bonus disc with the limited edition as well as with the digital version.

Love All Cover All track listing
| No. | Title | Writer(s) | Original artist | Length |
|---|---|---|---|---|
| 1. | "Sunny" | Bobby Hebb | Bobby Hebb | 3:08 |
| 2. | "No Tears Left to Cry" | Ariana Grande; Max Martin; Savan Kotecha; Ilya Salmanzadeh | Ariana Grande | 3:16 |
| 3. | "Hot Stuff" | Pete Bellotte; Harold Faltermeyer; Keith Forsey | Donna Summer | 3:34 |
| 4. | "Sorry" | Justin Bieber; Michael Tucker; Sonny Moore; Justin Tranter; Julia Michaels | Justin Bieber | 2:49 |
| 5. | "Good as Hell" | Melissa Jefferson; Eric Frederic | Lizzo | 2:38 |
| 6. | "Just the Two of Us" | Bill Withers; Ralph MacDonald; William Salter | Grover Washington Jr. | 3:37 |
| 7. | "Weak" | Brian Alexander Morgan | SWV | 4:46 |
| 8. | "Overprotected" | Martin; Rami | Britney Spears | 3:21 |
| 9. | "Teenage Dream" | Katy Perry; Lukasz Gottwald; Martin; Benjamin Levin; Bonnie McKee | Katy Perry | 4:13 |
| 10. | "Eh, Eh" | Stefani Germanotta; Martin Kierszenbaum | Lady Gaga | 2:46 |
| 11. | "Circles" | Austin Post; Louis Bell; Adam Feeney; Kaan Gunesberk; Billy Walsh | Post Malone | 3:16 |
| Total length: | | | | 37:27 |

== Charts ==
=== Weekly charts ===
Weekly chart performance for Love All Serve All
| Chart (2022) | Peak position |
|---|---|
| Japanese Albums (Oricon) | 1 |
| Japanese Combined Albums (Oricon) | 1 |
| Japanese Hot Albums (Billboard Japan) | 1 |

=== Monthly charts ===
Monthly chart performance for Love All Serve All
| Chart (2022) | Position |
|---|---|
| Japanese Albums (Oricon) | 2 |

=== Year-end charts ===
2022 year-end chart performance for Love All Serve All
| Chart (2022) | Position |
|---|---|
| Japanese Albums (Oricon) | 19 |
| Japanese Hot Albums (Billboard Japan) | 13 |

2023 year-end chart performance for Love All Serve All
| Chart (2023) | Position |
|---|---|
| Japanese Hot Albums (Billboard Japan) | 79 |

2024 year-end chart performance for Love All Serve All
| Chart (2024) | Position |
|---|---|
| Japanese Download Albums (Billboard Japan) | 43 |

2025 year-end chart performance for Love All Serve All
| Chart (2025) | Position |
|---|---|
| Japanese Hot Albums (Billboard Japan) | 21 |
