= Rohm Theatre Kyoto =

Coordinates: 35.014603°N 135.780753°E

- ロームシアター京都

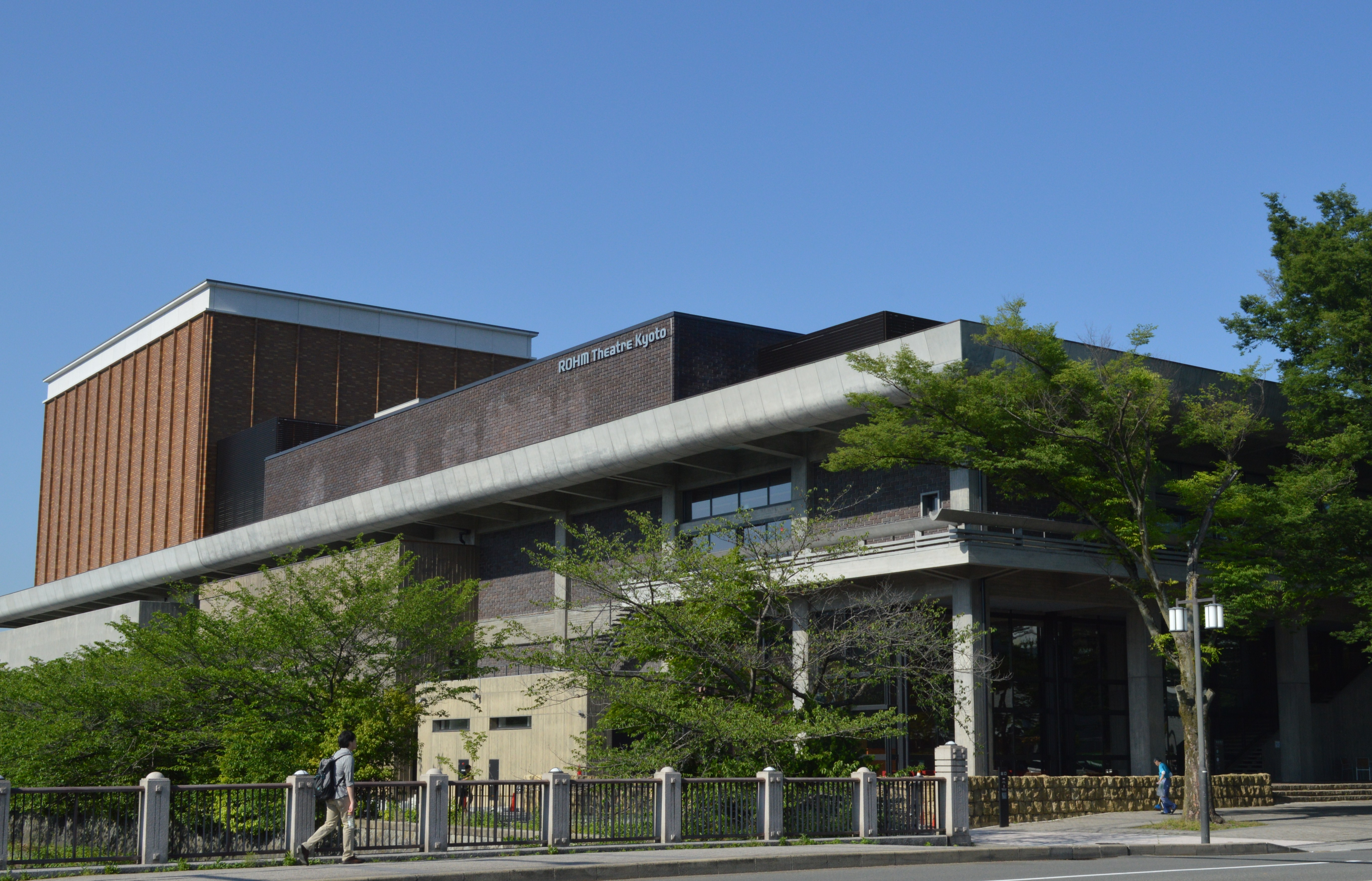
- Location of the theatre

- Location within Japan Location within Kyoto city
- Former names: Kyoto Kaikan
- Address: 13 Okazakisaishoji-cho, Sakyo-ku, Kyoto 606-8342 Japan
- Owner: City of Kyoto
- Seating type: Reserved
- Capacity: Main Hall: 2,005; South Hall: 716; North Hall: 200; Total: 2,921
- Type: Concert hall
- Public transit: Sanjō; Jingū-Marutamachi; Higashiyama

Construction
- Opened: 29 April 1960
- Renovated: 2012–2016
- Architect: Kunio Maekawa

Website
- rohmtheatrekyoto.jp/en/

Rohm Theatre Kyoto, officially known as Kyoto Kaikan, is a concert hall and performance venue located in Kyoto, Japan. The main hall was first opened in 1960 and seated 2,005 patrons. The facility closed in 2012 and was redeveloped over a four-year period, reopening in January 2016. As well as the main concert hall, the facility also has two additional performance spaces seating 700 and 200 guests.

Kyoto-based Rohm semiconductor saved the landmark post-modernist building from possible demolition by granting ¥5.25 billion towards the cost of refurbishment. In recognition of this contribution, Rohm received naming rights to the building.

== In popular culture ==
- EXILE vocalist Atsushi Satō filmed the music video for his cover of the Christian hymn "Amazing Grace" at an empty Rohm Theatre; this cover and its music video were released on April 30, 2021, coinciding with Atsushi's 41st birthday.

== See also ==
- List of concert halls
- Kyoto Concert Hall
