= Help Ever Hurt Never =

Studio album by Fujii Kaze
- Released: May 20, 2020
- Genre: J-pop
- Length: 46:32
- Labels: Hehn; Universal Sigma
- Producer: Yaffle

Fujii Kaze chronology
Help Ever Hurt Never (2020)	Love All Serve All (2022)

Singles from Help Ever Hurt Never
- 1. "Nan-Nan" Released: November 18, 2019; 2. "Mo-Eh-Wa" Released: December 24, 2019; 3. "Yasashisa" Released: April 17, 2020; 4. "Kiri ga Naikara" Released: May 15, 2020

Help Ever Hurt Never (stylized in all caps) is the first studio album by Japanese singer-songwriter Fujii Kaze. It was released on May 20, 2020, through Hehn Records and Universal Sigma. A cover album of English songs called Help Ever Hurt Cover, was released as a bonus disc with the first pressing of the CD. It was later made available digitally. It was certified Platinum in sales by RIAJ.

== Tour ==
A supporting tour for the album, Help Ever Hall Tour, started on December 25, 2020, and ran until January 31, 2021. It was Fujii's first national tour. Tickets for this tour were in the form of advance applications using the serial code included with the album, and lottery applications for general sales were accepted from November 9. In addition, for performances held after January 2021, official ticket trading was carried out at Chikepla Trade. From the perspective of preventing the spread of COVID-19, the performances were held at 50% of the capacity of each venue and with a checkered seating arrangement.

== Track listing ==
=== Standard edition ===
Titles as given on Western streaming services first, followed by the original Japanese title and then the English titles as given in the booklet.

All songs are written by Fujii Kaze; all music is arranged by Yaffle.

No.	Title	Length
1.	"Nan-nan (何なん; "WTF lol")"	5:20
2.	"Mou ee wa (もうええわ; "I'm Over It")"	5:01
3.	"Yasashisa (優しさ; "Kindness")"	4:01
4.	"Kiri ga nai kara (キリがないから; "Cause It's Endless")"	3:37
5.	"Tsumi no Kaori (罪の香り; "Flavor of Sin")"	3:34
6.	"Choushi Nocchatte (調子のっちゃって; "Oops I Pushed My Luck")"	4:42
7.	"Toku ni nai (特にない; "Not Particularly")"	3:25
8.	"Shinu no ga ii wa (死ぬのがいいわ; "I'd Rather Die")"	3:05
9.	"Kaze yo (風よ; "Hey Mr. Wind")"	4:44
10.	"Sayonara Baby (さよならべいべ)"	4:20
11.	"Kaerou (帰ろう; "Let's Go Home")"	4:44
Total length:		46:32

=== Help Ever Hurt Cover ===
Released as the second disc of the first pressing CD, as well as digitally.

No.	Title	Writer(s)	Original artist	Length
1.	"Close to You"	Burt Bacharach; Hal David	The Carpenters	3:40
2.	"Shape of You"	Ed Sheeran; Johnny McDaid; Kandi Burruss; Kevin "She'kspere" Briggs; Tameka Cottle	Ed Sheeran	2:25
3.	"Back Stabbers"	Leon Huff; Gene McFadden; John Whitehead	O'Jays	3:08
4.	"Alfie"	Bacharach; David	Burt Bacharach	2:32
5.	"Be Alright"	Ariana Grande; Tommy Brown; Victoria Monét; Khaled Rohaim; Nicholas Audino; Lewis Hughes; Willie Tafa; Alexander Crossan; Neo Jessica Joshua	Ariana Grande	3:04
6.	"Beat It"	Michael Jackson	Michael Jackson	3:21
7.	"Don't Let Me Be Misunderstood"	Bennie Benjamin; Horace Ott; Sol Marcus	The Animals	2:38
8.	"My Eyes Adored You"	Bob Crewe; Kenny Nolan	Frankie Valli	3:39
9.	"Shake It Off"	Taylor Swift; Max Martin; Shellback	Taylor Swift	4:33
10.	"Stronger Than Me"	Amy Winehouse; Salaam Remi	Amy Winehouse	3:46
11.	"Time After Time"	Sammy Cahn	Dinah Washington	4:06
Total length:				36:39

== Personnel ==
- Fujii Kaze – vocals, piano
- Leon Yuuki – drums (tracks 1, 2, 5, 6, 7, 10 and 11)
- Osami Kobayashi – electric bass (tracks 1, 5, 10 and 11)
- Takumi Katsuya – double bass (track 7)
- Bunta Otsuki – electric guitar (tracks 1, 2, 5 and 10), acoustic guitar (track 9)
- Takashi Fukuoka – percussion (tracks 5, 6, 9 and 11)
- Tatsuhiko Yoshizawa – trumpet (track 5)
- Natsuki Oba – flute (track 5)
- Oda Sena – baritone saxophone (track 5)
- Yuta Ishii – tenor saxophone (track 5)
- Amane Takai – trombone (track 5)
- Rina Kodera – first violin (tracks 3, 6 and 11)
- Sayuri Yano – second violin (track 3)
- Natsue Kameda – second violin (tracks 6 and 11)
- Takahiro Enokido – viola (track 3)
- Mikiyo Kikuchi – first viola (tracks 6 and 11)
- Reiichi Tateizumi – second viola (tracks 6 and 11)
- Yuki Mizuno – cello (tracks 3, 6 and 11)

== Charts ==
=== Weekly charts ===
Weekly chart performance for Help Ever Hurt Never
Chart (2020)	Peak position
Japanese Albums (Oricon)	2
Japanese Combined Albums (Oricon)	2
Japanese Hot Albums (Billboard Japan	1

=== Monthly charts ===
Monthly chart performance for Help Ever Hurt Never
Chart (2020)	Position
Japanese Albums (Oricon)	2

=== Year-end charts ===
2020 year-end chart performance for Help Ever Hurt Never
Chart (2020)	Position
Japanese Albums (Oricon)	41
Japanese Hot Albums (Billboard Japan)	34

2021 year-end chart performance for Help Ever Hurt Never
Chart (2021)	Position
Japanese Albums (Oricon)	54
Japanese Hot Albums (Billboard Japan)	29

2022 year-end chart performance for Help Ever Hurt Never
Chart (2022)	Position
Japanese Albums (Oricon)	89
Japanese Hot Albums (Billboard Japan)	58

2023 year-end chart performance for Help Ever Hurt Never
Chart (2023)	Position
Japanese Hot Albums (Billboard Japan)	92

2024 year-end chart performance for Help Ever Hurt Never
Chart (2024)	Position
Japanese Download Albums (Billboard Japan)	67

2025 year-end chart performance for Help Ever Hurt Never
Chart (2025)	Position
Japanese Hot Albums (Billboard Japan)	23

== Certifications ==
Certifications for Help Ever Hurt Never
Region	Certification	Certified units/sales
Japan (RIAJ)	Platinum	250,000^{^}
^{^} Shipments figures based on certification alone.
