= Music Awards Japan =

Japanese music awards

- Current: 2026 Music Awards Japan
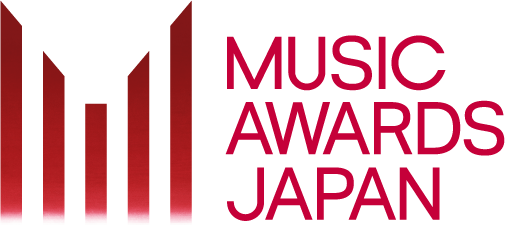
- The official logo for the awards
- Country: Japan
- Presented by: Japan Culture and Entertainment Industry Promotion Association
- First award: 2025
- Website: musicawardsjapan.com

The Music Awards Japan (abbreviated as MAJ) is a music awards show by the Japanese music industry to honour musical talents from Asia, Japan and the Western regions. The awards are organized by the Japan Culture and Entertainment Industry Promotion Association (CEIPA) in collaboration with the Japan's Ministry of Economy, Trade and Industry (METI). The inaugural award show was held on May 21 and 22, 2025, at the Rohm Theater, Kyoto.

== History ==
On October 22, 2024, the Music Awards Japan were officially announced. The awards were introduced to promote Japanese and Asian music on a global stage. The five major music organizations of the Japanese music industry, the Recording Industry Association of Japan (RIAJ), the Japan Association of Music Enterprises, the Federation of Music Producers Japan, the Music Publishers Association of Japan, and the All Japan Concert & Live Entertainment Promoter's Conference, founded the Japan Culture and Entertainment Industry Promotion Association, which is responsible for the organization, marketing and hosting of the Music Awards Japan. One of the backgrounds for the establishment of this award is to strengthen, to change and to open the Japanese music market for a global audience.

In December 2024, the six main categories were introduced, and more categories were announced in January 2025. The inaugural award show was held on May 21 and 22, 2025, at Rohm Theater in Kyoto. On January 15, 2025, NHK was announced to broadcast the second day of the award show, while both days were livestreamed globally on YouTube. A showcase titled Matsuri '25: Japanese Music Experience was announced to be held on March 16, 2025, at Peacock Theater, Los Angeles with Ado, Atarashii Gakko! and Yoasobi performing. This is first global showcase to be held prior to the awards to raise awareness of Japanese music artists and the music prize itself.

In the week of the award show the MAJ Music Week was held including concerts, seminars and conferences.

On September 15, 2025, it was announced that 2026 Music Awards Japan would be held at Toyota Arena Tokyo in Ariake, Tokyo.

== Background ==
During a press conference held at Live Entertainment Expo in Tokyo, Tatsuya Nomura, the CEO of the Federation of Music Producers Japan stated that consumer behavior has changed drastically in Japan during the COVID-19 pandemic, shifting from physical purchases to digital media. Nomura added that the establishment of an award show similar to the Grammy Awards in the United States, BRIT Awards in the United Kingdom and ARIA Music Awards in Australia might be able to increase the international interest in Japanese music and support the expansion of the domestic music market.

Shunsuke Muramatsu, CEO of the Recording Industry Association of Japan and founding member of CEIPA, further explained that the music industry is on the verge of change, which can be observed since 2019. Muramatsu stated that the declining domestic music market is a result of the shrinking population. He noted that opening of the domestic music market for a global audience is necessary.

== Nominations and awarding process ==
Based on metrics from Billboard Japan, Oricon, GfK Japan, Luminate, Usen, the Daiichi Kosho Company, the JASRAC and more, an automated system selects artists, songs and albums that are eligible to be nominated for an award.

From this pool, a panel consisting of people from the Japanese music industry select five nominations for each category. The winners of most categories are selected by an international jury consisting of 5,000 people from the international music industry. At the inaugural award ceremony, there are two categories where the nominations and winners are select by a public vote on Spotify.

In an interview with Real Sound, Nomura explained the details of the voting process, which is held in two rounds. Eligible voting members of the first round of voting are given up to five votes each. It is possible to vote at least once for their own work or a work that the voting member was part of in another function, depending on if the work has been selected by the automated system. Only voting members who participated in the first voting round are eligible for voting in the second voting round.

== Ceremonies ==
Year	Date of ceremony	Host(s)	Venue	Network
2025	May 21–22, 2025	Hiroe Igeta (May 21); Kasumi Mori (May 21); Atsushi Yanaka (May 21); Masaki Suda (May 22)	Rohm Theatre Kyoto	NHK General TV
2026	June 13, 2026	Kasumi Mori (premiere ceremony); Atsushi Yanaka (premiere ceremony); Masaki Suda (grand ceremony)	SGC Hall Ariake (premiere ceremony); Toyota Arena Tokyo (grand ceremony)	Tokyo MX (premiere ceremony); NHK General TV (grand ceremony)

== Categories ==
Categories adapted from official website.

- Song of the Year
  - Best Japanese Songs
  - Best J-Rock Songs
  - Best Japanese Hip-Hop/Rap Songs
  - Best Japanese R&B/Contemporary Songs
  - Best Japanese Dance Pop Songs
  - Best Japanese Alternative Songs
  - Best Japanese Singer-Songwriter Songs
  - Best Idol Culture Songs
  - Best Anime Songs
  - Best Enka/Kayōkyoku Songs
  - Best Revival Hit Songs
  - Best Cross-Border Collaboration Songs
  - Best Vocaloid Culture Songs
  - Best Music Video
  - Best Dance Performance
  - Best Viral Songs
- Top Global Hit from Japan (Note: The most-successful songs by a Japanese artist based on streaming, downloads and video views. If a Japanese artist has more than one song charted on the global charts, the highest-ranking song will be eligible for nomination.)
  - Top Japanese Song in Asia
  - Top Japanese Song in Europe
  - Top Japanese Song in North America
  - Top Japanese Song in Latin America
  - Best of Listeners' Choice: Japanese Song
- Best Song Asia (Note: Nominations are based on the ranking of the domestic year-end charts, excluding Japanese artists. Songs released by artists from the following countries are eligible for a nomination at the inaugural award show: China, Hong Kong, Indonesia, Malaysia, the Philippines, Singapore, South Korea, Taiwan, Thailand and Vietnam.)
  - Special Award: Korean Popular Music
  - Special Award: Chinese Popular Music
  - Special Award: Thai Popular Music
  - Special Award: Indonesian Popular Music
  - Special Award: Vietnamese Popular Music
  - Special Award: Philippine Popular Music
  - Best International Pop Song in Japan
  - Best International Rock Song in Japan
  - Best International Hip Hop Song in Japan
  - Best International R&B/Soul Song in Japan
  - Best International Alternative Song in Japan
  - Best K-Pop Song in Japan
  - Best of Listeners' Choice: International Song
- Album of the Year
  - Best Jazz Album
  - Best Classical Album
- Artist of the Year (Note: Artists who have been nominated for Album of the Year and/or Song of the Year categories are eligible for a nomination in Artist of the Year.)
- New Artist of the Year (Note: Artists who meet the criteria according to the release of the Billboard Japan Heatseeksers Songs are ineligible for a nomination in New Artist of the Year category. These criteria are: Artists who have ranked in the top-20 in the Japan Hot 100 and/or in the top-10 Japan Hot Albums six months prior the award show; Artists who have ranked in the top-20 and stayed for at least 4 months (17 weeks) in the Billboard Japan Heatseekers Songs six months prior the award show)
  - Best Japanese Song Artist
  - Best J-Rock Artist
  - Best Japanese Hip Hop/Rap Artist
  - Best Japanese R&B/Contemporary Artist
  - Best Japanese Dance Pop Artist
  - Best Japanese Alternative Artist
  - Best Japanese Singer-Songwriter
  - Best Idol Artist/Group
  - MAJ Timeless Echo
- Partnership awards
  - Special Award: Karaoke of the Year: J-Pop
  - Special Award: Karaoke of the Year: Enka/Kayōkyoku
  - Special Award: Oshi-Katsu Request Artist of the Year
  - Special Award: Song of the Year for Creators
- Live Performance awards
  - Largest Live Audience
- Music-Tech awards
  - Honorary Award in Music Technology
- Alliance awards
  - Special Award: Radio Best Radio-Break Song
  - Best Dance/Electronic Song
  - Best DJ
  - Grand Prix Engineer
