= List of releases recorded live at Nippon Budokan =

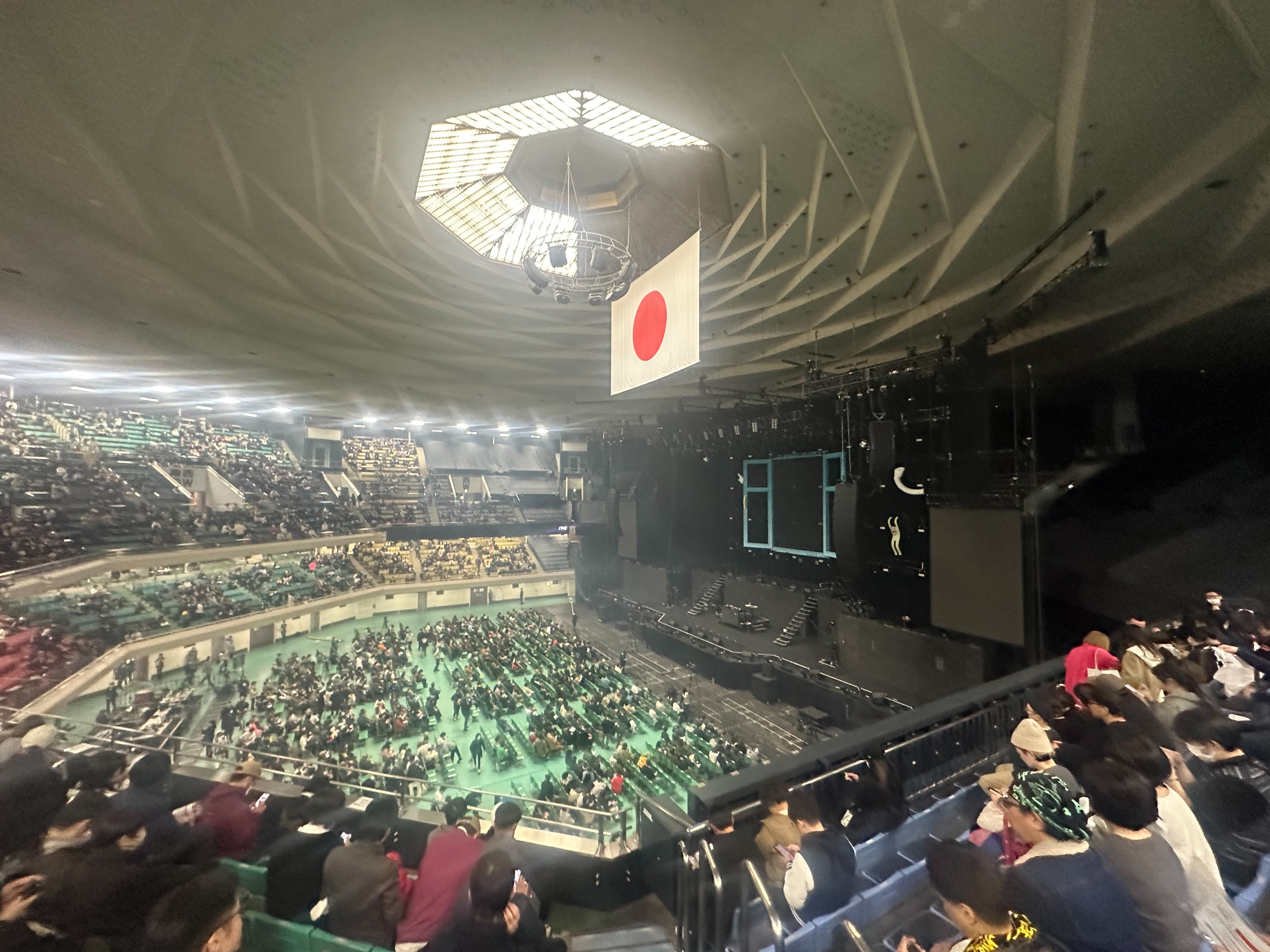
A concert stage at the Budokan in 2024

Outside and inside of the Budokan configured for a concert in 2024

The Nippon Budokan, often shortened to simply Budokan, is an arena in Chiyoda, Tokyo, originally built for Judo at the 1964 Summer Olympics.

While its primary purpose is to host martial arts contests, the arena has gained additional fame as one of the world's most outstanding musical performance venues. The 42 metres (138 ft) high octagonal structure holds 14,471 people (arena seats: 2,946, first floor seats: 3,199, second floor seats: 7,846, standee: 480). The venue is popular for recording live albums because it has good acoustics, is relatively large and Japanese audiences are known for being highly appreciative when appropriate but quiet during performances. Eric Clapton described the Tokyo audience as "almost overappreciative" in interviews promoting Just One Night (1980), his own live album recorded at the Budokan.

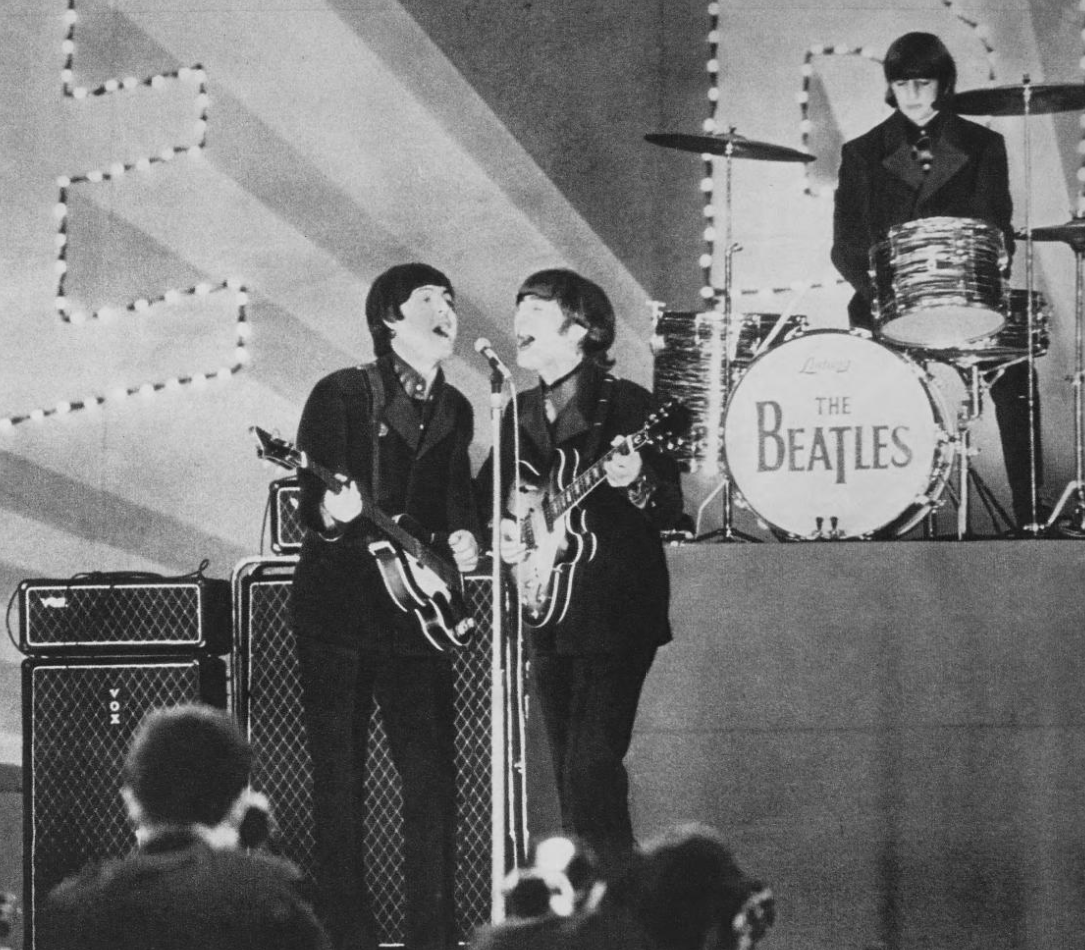
The Beatles performing at the Budokan in 1966

The Beatles were the first rock group to play at the Budokan, in a series of five concerts, each lasting 30 minutes, June 30 – July 2, 1966. Their appearances were met with opposition from those who felt the appearance of a western pop group would defile the martial arts arena. Many bootleg recordings, both video and audio, have been distributed, but the first official Japan-only releases of Concert at Budokan 1966, using footage from Nippon TV, were in 1984 on VHS, and re-released in 1993 by Apple Records on LaserDisc.

The record for the most Budokan music concerts is held by Eikichi Yazawa, 142 times as of December 19, 2017.

This is a dynamic list of verifiable, official or notable unofficial (e.g. bootleg), public releases of performances recorded at Nippon Budokan, including:

- physical formats (e.g. vinyl, optical discs, cassettes)
- digital formats (e.g. streams and downloads)
- television and radio broadcasts
- theatrical screenings

Formatting of entries should be maintained inline with Wikipedia's Manual of Style guidelines for lists of works, particularly for discographies, with works titled inline with our standard style.

== Notable unofficial releases ==
- Led Zeppelin performed at the Budokan in 1971 and 1972. In 2018 Hideo Yamada uploaded scanned 8 mm film of the 1971 concert to YouTube. After receiving attention from fans, Yamada and friend T. Ohtaki shipped their footage to the US to be color corrected and rescanned in 4K resolution for subsequent upload online. Prior to this, only fan recorded audio of the concert had been unofficially released, though reports of professional audio recordings have circulated.

== Music ==
=== 1970s ===
- Deep Purple: Made in Japan (Purple, December 8, 1972) – compiled from recordings of three 1972 Japan concerts, two at the Festival Hall, Osaka 15–16 and one at the Budokan 17 August
- Uriah Heep (1973) – concert filmed on 16mm for television; DVD versions available
- The Carpenters; June 7–9, 1974; Live in Japan
- Neil Young; March 10 and 11, 1976; Odeon Budokan
- Rainbow; December 16, 1976; On Stage Rainbow performed here both afternoon and evening shows at 3:00 pm and 6:00 p.m.
- Aerosmith; 1977 (Jan–Feb); see the Japanese bootleg CD Rocks Budokan (label Calm&Storm)
- Bay City Rollers; 1977; released as Rollerworld: Live at the Budokan 1977 in 2001
- Cheap Trick: Cheap Trick at Budokan (Epic, October 8, 1978) – recorded April 28–30, 1978
- Pink Lady: Bye Bye Carnival (Victor, March 5, 1978) – recorded December 27, 1977
- Pink Lady: Live in Budoukan (Victor, February 5, 1979) – recorded December 25, 1978
- Ian Gillan Band; 1977–1978; Live at the Budokan (Vols. 1–2)
- Eric Clapton; December 1979; Just One Night
- Diana Ross; 1977; "An Evening with Diana Ross" concert was videotaped during her 1977 tour
- Eikichi Yazawa; 1977; Super Live Nippon Budokan, recorded his Budokan concerts of 1977
- Devo; 1979 "The Men Who Make the Music" Japanese TV broadcast. A clip of "Red Eye Express" from this show is included in The Men Who Make The Music home video
- Bob Dylan: Bob Dylan at Budokan (CBS/Sony, August 21, 1979) – recorded February 28 and March 1, 1978

=== 1980s ===
- Sadao Watanabe; 1980; How's Everything
- ABBA; 1980
- Momoe Yamaguchi; 1980; Budokan at Last
- Masayoshi Takanaka; 1981; Rainbow Goblins Story / Live At Budokan, released 1986
- Queen; 1981; "The Game Tour". 1985; "The Works Tour"
- The Police; 1981; Budokan Radio On, released 1988
- Michael Schenker Group; 1981; One Night at Budokan, released in 1982, deluxe edition released in 2009
- John Denver, 1981
- Quincy Jones; 1981; Quincy Jones Live at the Budokan
- Journey; 1982; "Escape Tour". 1983; "Frontiers Tour"
- Styx; 1982
- Kitarō; 1982; Live at Budokan
- Toto; 1982; Live at Budokan 1982, Toto IV Tour
- Japan; 1982; Live from the Budokan 1982, Final Tour (some songs feature Yellow Magic Orchestra members Yukihiro Takahashi and Ryuichi Sakamoto)
- Dave Grusin; 1983; Dave Grusin and the NY-LA Dream Band
- Grover Washington Jr., Pieces of A Dream; 1983; Aurex Jazz Festival
- Michael Schenker Group; 1982; One Night at Budokan
- Asia; 1983; Live at Budokan, Asia in Asia
- Yellow Magic Orchestra: After Service (Alfa, February 22, 1984) – recorded December 12–13, 1983
- Willie Nelson; 1984, February 23, Live At Budokan
- Gary Moore; 1984; We Want Moore! during the Victims of the Future tour in 1984, remastered 2002 (Budokan was one of several venues where this album was recorded)
- Frank Sinatra; 1985; Live at the Budokan Hall, Tokyo
- Phil Collins; 1985; The No Jacket Required World Tour
- Corey Hart; 1985
- Momoko Kikuchi; 1985; "Advanced Domestic Tour Budokan"
- Cyndi Lauper; 1986; "Live in Tokyo"
- Judas Priest; 1986; "Fuel for Life Tour"
- Iron Maiden; 1987, "Somewhere on tour"
- Boøwy; 1986, "Gigs" Just a Hero Tour 1986 ("Prologue", "Bad Feeling", "Rouge of Gray", "Image Down" and "Just a Hero")
- Dead or Alive; 1987 video Rip It Up Live (VHS/LaserDisc)
- Genesis; 1987; "Invisible Touch Tour"
- Pink Floyd; March 2 & 3, 1988; "A Momentary Lapse of Reason Tour"
- Tina Turner; March 24 & 25, 1988; "Break Every Rule World Tour"
- Kiss; 1988; "Crazy Nights Tour"
- Miho Nakayama; May 11, 1989; Whuu!! Natural Live at Budokan '89
- Stryper 1989; "In God We Trust tour

=== 1990s ===
- X Japan; 1990; Rose & Blood Tour
- Seiko Matsuda – Precious Moment ~1990 Live at Budokan~
- X Japan; 1991
- Loudness – Live Loudest at the Budokan '91
- B'z – Just Another Life (1991).
- Debbie Gibson – Live In Tokyo: The Possibilities World Tour
- X Japan; 1992; Extasy Summit 1992
- Tin Machine; 1992; who recorded a portion of Tin Machine Live: Oy Vey, Baby, during the It's My Life Tour
- Skid Row – Live at Budokan, Tokyo 1992
- Diana Ross, Tokyo 1992; 'The Force Behind the Power World Tour'
- X Japan; 1993
- Yellow Magic Orchestra: Live At The Budokan 1980 (1993)
- The Beatles; July 1993; Concert at Budokan 1966
- The Doobie Brothers; 1993; Live at Budokan
- Cheap Trick: Budokan II (Epic, 1994) – recorded April 28–30, 1978; a so-called "sequel" to Cheap Trick at Budokan (1978), containing further recordings from the same concert
- Aerosmith; 1994; Get a Grip Tour
- Peter Gabriel; 1994; Secret World Tour
- Yngwie Malmsteen; 1994; video Live at Budokan 94, VHS/DVD
- Blur; 1995–6; recorded a live compilation CD, Live at the Budokan, in 1995, at the height of Britpop; it was released in 1996
- Pearl Jam; 1995 on the Vitalogy Tour
- Princess Princess; May 31, 1996; The Last Live
- Chic; 1996; performance later released as Live at the Budōkan (1999). This was bassist Bernard Edwards's last performance; he died the next day
- Gloria Estefan; 1997; "Evolution Tour"
- Diana Ross; 1996; 'Take Me Higher World Tour'
- Prince; 1996 Prince performed four concerts during the year as the Artist formerly known as Prince
- Mr. Big: Live at Budokan (1997) – recorded 1997
- Cheap Trick: At Budokan: The Complete Concert (Epic, 1998) – recorded April 28–30, 1978; remastered and expanded edition of Cheap Trick at Budokan (1978)
- Oasis; 1998; Oasis performed three nights in a row during their 'Be Here Now tour'
- Puffy; 1998; Recorded Jet Tour '98 in support of the album Jet-CD
- Malice Mizer; 1998; two night stint at the Budokan in support of Merveilles, which yielded their live video Merveilles ~Shuuen to Kisuu~ L'Espace
- Journey; 1998; Recorded several songs from their Frontiers Tour in 1983 at the Budokan which was included on their live album Greatest Hits Live
- Lauryn Hill; 1999; The Miseducation Tour (two sold-out shows)
- Faye Wong; 1999; Budokan Live (for further information see: Faye Wong § 1999: "Eyes on Me" and Lovers & Strangers)

=== 2000s ===
- Bryan Adams; 2000; Live at the Budokan
- Morning Musume; 2000; DVD Morning Musume First Live at Budōkan: Dancing Love Site 2000 Haru (Also Sayaka Ichii's graduation from the group)
- Malice Mizer; 2-night stint at the Budokan in support of Bara no Seidou, which yielded their live video Bara ni Irodorareta Akui to Higeki no Makuake
- Bay City Rollers; 2001; Rollerworld, Live at the Budokan 1977, released as Rollerworld: Live at the Budokan 1977 in 2001
- Ozzy Osbourne; 2002; filmed CD/DVD combination Live at Budokan
- Porno Graffitti; 2002; 5th Live Circuit "Bitter Sweet Music Biz" Live at Budokan 2002
- Pearl Jam: 3/3/03 – Tokyo, Japan (Epic, 2003) – Pearl Jam official bootleg
- Duran Duran; July 11 + 12, 2003; played at Budokan; shows recorded live
- Mariah Carey; 2003; performed three concert shows, part of her Charmbracelet World Tour on July 6, 8 and 10
- Incubus; March 3, 2004; performed at Budokan and show recorded as CD Live in Japan 2004 on June 1, 2004
- Dream Theater; 2004; 2DVD/3CD Live at Budokan
- Zard; July 23, 2004; What a Beautiful Moment Concert Tour 2004
- Hikaru Utada; July 28, 2004; video Utada Hikaru in Budokan 2004: Hikaru no 5
- Asian Kung-Fu Generation; December 5, 2004; DVD Eizō Sakuhinshū Vol. 2
- Beastie Boys; January 14, 2005
- Judas Priest; 2005; DVD Rising in the East
- Nana Mizuki; 2005; DVD Nana Mizuki Live Rainbow at Budokan
- Avril Lavigne: Bonez Tour 2005: Live at Budokan (BMG Japan, 2005) – recorded March 10, 2005
- Yuki, May 20, 2005; Yuki Live Yuki Tour "Joy" at Nippon Budokan
- Hikaru Utada; 2006; video Utada United 2006 (Hikaru Utada albums discography § Live concert video albums)
- Nana Mizuki; 2006; DVD Nana Mizuki Livedom -Birth- at Budokan
- Mucc; 2006; DVD World Tour Final Nippon Budokan 666
- Morning Musume; 2006; DVD Morning Musume Concert Tour 2006 Aki: Odore! Morning Curry
- The Gazette; 2006; DVD Standing Live Tour 2006 [Nameless Liberty. Six Guns...] Tour Final at Nippon Budokan
- Every Little Thing: 10th Anniversary Special Live at Nippon Budokan (Avex Trax, 2007) – DVD
- Ai; 2007; video; Live Ai
- Bonnie Pink; 2007; Tour 2007 "Thinking Out Loud" Final at Nippon Budokan
- TM Network; 2007; video TM Network -Remaster- at Nippon Budokan 2007
- TVXQ; 2007; Tohoshinki 2nd Live Tour 2007: Five in the Black
- Zard; September 14, 2007; What a Beautiful Memory Concert Tour
- Yuki, November 1–2, 2007, Yuki Live "5-star"
- Cheap Trick: Budokan! (Epic, 2008) – recorded April 28–30, 1978; 30th anniversary DVD
- Jay Chou; February 16–18, 2008; The World Tour
- Syrup16g; March 1, 2008; The Last Day of Syrup16g
- Perfume; 2008; "Budokaaaaaaaaaan!!!!!"
- Joe Hisaishi; 2008; Joe Hisaishi in Budokan – 25 years with the Animations of Hayao Miyazaki
- Flow; 2008; Flow Live Tour 2007–2008 'Isle' Final at Nippon Budokan
- Chatmonchy; 2008; [Restaurant Main Dish] Live at: Budokan 2008
- Yuki, May 29–30, 2008, Yuki concert New Rhythm Tour 2008
- Kishidan; 2009; Kishidan Phenomenon 2009 Again and Again DVD
- Asian Kung-Fu Generation; December 12–13, 2008; Live Tour 酔杯 2008 ～THE FINAL～
- Nana Mizuki; 2009; Blu-ray/DVD Nana Mizuki Live Diamond x Fever
- Mucc; 2009; DVD -Mucc Live Chronicle 3 "Kyutai" in Nippon Budokan-
- Mr. Big: Back to Budokan (2009)
- AKB48; 2009; AKB104 Senbatsu Members Sokaku Matsuri
- Zard; May 27, 2009; What a Beautiful Memory Concert Tour
- The Pillows; 2009; live DVD Lostman Go to Budokan

=== 2010s ===
==== 2010 ====
- Dir En Grey; January 9–10, 2010; live DVD Uroboros: With the Proof in the Name of Living... At Nippon Budokan.
- An Cafe; January 14, 2010; King of Harajuku Dance Rock.
- Backstreet Boys; February 18, 2010; recorded live DVD Backstreet Boys: This Is Us Japan Tour 2010 on the This Is Us Tour.
- Nico Touches the Walls; March 12, 2010; "Walls is Auroras" LIVE.
- Polysics; March 14, 2010; Budokan or Die!!!! 2010.3.14
- One Ok Rock; 2010; live DVD This Is My Budokan?!.

==== 2011 ====
- Taylor Swift; February 26 & 27, 2011; Speak Now World Tour
- Morning Musume; 2011; Ai Takahashi's graduation concert "Ai Believe ~Takahashi Ai Graduation Memory Special~.
- F.T. Island; 2011; Live in Budokan 'Summer Messenger Tour'.
- Mucc; 2011; live DVD Chemical Parade

==== 2012 ====
- Vivid January 7, 2012; Take Off: Birth to the New World
- Judas Priest; February 16 & 17, 2012; Epitaph World Tour
- Asian Kung-Fu Generation; February 22–23, 2012; Best Hit AKG
- 2PM; May 24–31, 2012; 2PM Six Beautiful Days Live in Budokan
- Milky Holmes; 2012; Milky Holmes Live in Budokan
- Lee Seung-gi; 2012; First Japan Live in Budokan Kidou (Hope).
- T-ara; 2012; Live in Budokan, recording of a concert performed as part of their Jewelry Box tour; First Korean girl group to perform at Nippon Budokan
- Dream Morning Musume; March 10, 2012; Dream Morning Musume Special Live 2012 Nippon Budokan~Dai 1 Shou Shuumaku 'Yuusha tachi, Shuugou seyo'
- U-KISS; 2012; live DVD U-KISS Live in Budokan.
- Morning Musume; 2012; Risa Niigaki and Aika Mitsui's graduation concert Ultra Smart.
- Scandal; March 28, 2012; Japan Title Match Live 2012: Scandal vs Budokan
- Sonar Pocket; August 3, 2012; Sonapokeizm Special – Natsu no Jin – in Nippon Budokan
- Yuki; September 11–12, 2012, Yuki Tour "Beats of Ten" final
- Acid Black Cherry; 2012; Live DVD Acid Black Cherry Tour "2012"
- Kyary Pamyu Pamyu; November 6, 2012; Dokidoki Wakuwaku Pamyu Pamyu Revolution Land 2012 in Kira Kira Budōkan
- Norah Jones; November 8–9, 2012; Little Broken Hearts Tour
- Koda Kumi; November 13, 2012; KODA KUMI premium night ~Love & Songs~
- Princess Princess; November 23, 2012; Princess Princess Tour 2012: Saikai at Budokan
- Ai; December 5, 2012; Independent Tour 2012 – Live in Budokan
- Spyair; December 18, 2012;

==== 2013 ====
- Morning Musume; 2013; Reina Tanaka's graduation concert, Michishige☆Eleven Soul
- Cute; 2013; Queen of J-Pop ~Tadoritsuita Onna Senshi~
- AKB48; 2013; AKB48 Group Rinji Soukai "Shirokuro tsukeyou janai ka!"
- T-ara; 2013; 2nd Tour Final in Budokan, recording of a concert performed as part of their Treasure Box tour
- Morning Musume; 2013; ~Chance!~
- Ling Tosite Sigure; June 28, 2013; ～Nippon Budokan 10th Tornado Anniversary～
- Berryz Kobo; 2013; Berryz Koubou 10 Shuunen Kinen Budokan Special Live ~Yappari Anata Nashi de wa Ikite Yukenai~
- AKB48 Group Research Students; 2013; AKB48 Group Kenkyuusei Concert ~Oshimen Hayai Mono Gachi~
- Super Junior; 2013; Special Japan tour Super Junior K.R.Y. Special Winter Concert
- Mamoru Miyano; October 4, 2013; Mamoru Miyano Special Live 2013 ～Traveling!～ first male voice actor to uphold a one-man show in Budokan

==== 2014 ====
- Lisa; January 3, 2014; Live Is Smile Always – Kyo mo Ii Hi Da – In Nippon Budokan
- Avril Lavigne; February 4–5, 2014: The Avril Lavigne Tour
- Babymetal; March 1–2, 2014; Live at Budokan: Red Night & Black Night Apocalypse (Metal Resistance: Episode I)
- Dir En Grey; March 8–9, 2014; Dum Spiro Spero at Nippon Budokan
- Ai; March 26, 2014; Moria Gatchai Masita in Budokan
- Alexandros; March 28, 2014; Live at Budokan 2014
- Smileage; July 15, 2014; Smileage Live 2014 Natsu Full Charge ~715 Nippon Budokan~
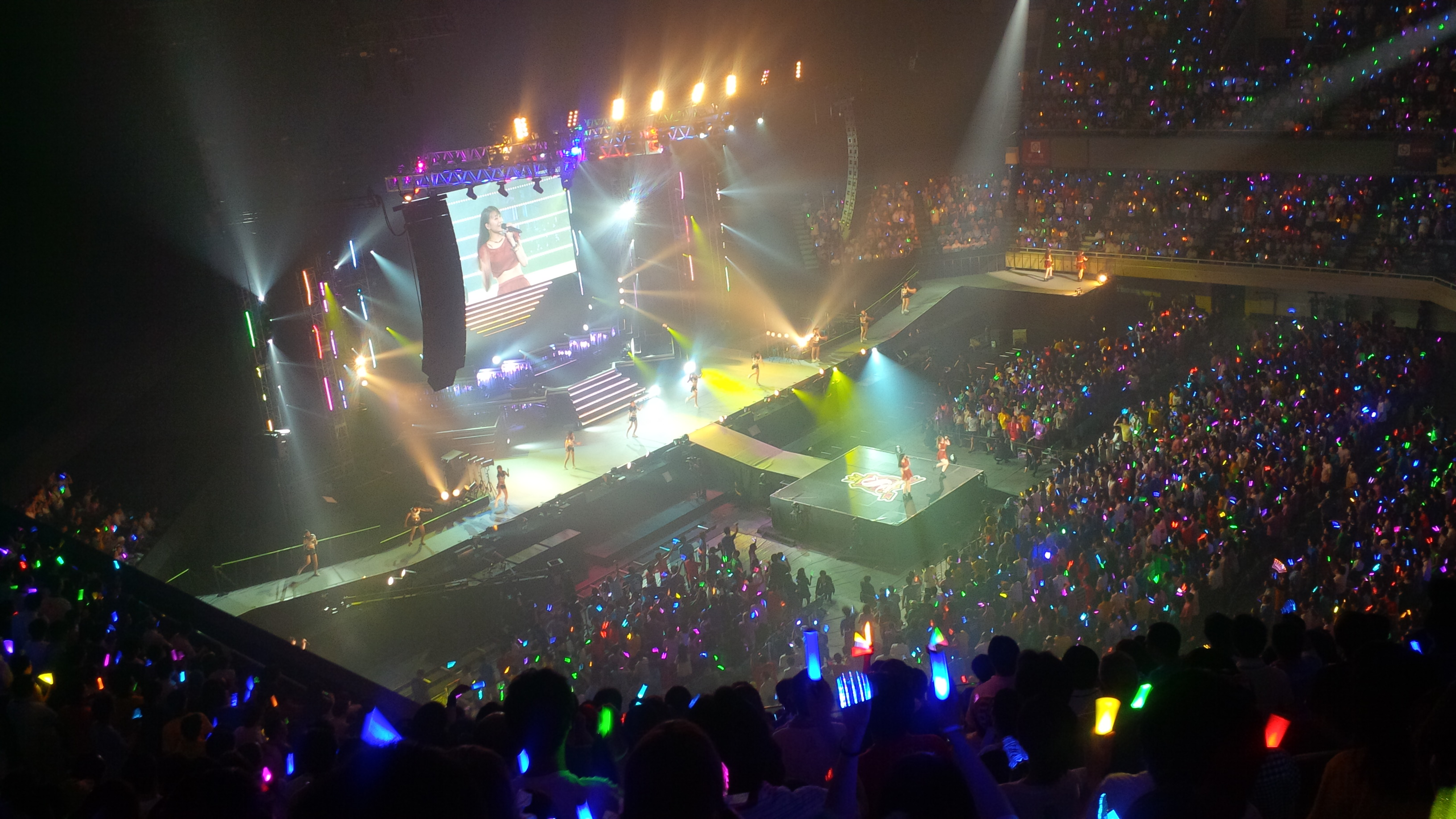
  Smileage performing at the Budokan in 2014
- Lee Jun-ho; August 12–13, 2014; Junho Solo Tour 2014 "Feel"

==== 2015 ====
- Dish; January 1, 2015
- Lisa; January 10 and 12, 2015; Live is Smile Always – Pink & Black – in Nippon Budokan
- Silent Siren; January 17, 2015; Silent Siren Live Tour 2014–2015 Fuyu ~Budokan e Go! Siren Go!~ at Budokan
- Oldcodex; February 11, 2015; "Capture" in Budokan
- Mamoru Miyano; 2015; Mamoru Miyano Live Tour 2015 ～Amazing!～ final at Budokan
- Kalafina; February 28, 2015; Kalafina Live Best 2015 "Red Day". March 1, 2015; Kalafina Live Best 2015 "Blue Day"
- The Gazette; March 3, 2015; 13th Anniversary Nippon Budokan
- Judas Priest; March 11, 2015; Redeemer of Souls Tour
- Kana-Boon; March 31, 2015
- Morning Musume; May 27, 2015; ~Gradation~.
- Kiryū; July 31, 2015
- Mayday; August 28–29, 2015; Just Rock it!!! – World Tour
- Hatsune Miku; September 4–5, 2015; Hatsune Miku "Magical Mirai 2015".
- Eir Aoi; November 2, 2015; Eir Aoi Special Live 2015 World of Blue at Nippon Budokan
- Yuki; November 18–19; Yuki Live dance in a circle'15
- Angerme;, November 29, 2015; Angerme First Concert Tour 2015 Aki "Hyakka Ryouran" ~Fukuda Kanon Sotsugyou Special~
- Morning Musume; December 7–8, 2015; ~Prism~.

==== 2016 ====
- Dish; January 1–2, 2016; 4 Monkey Magic.
- Wagakki Band; January 6, 2016; Wagakki Band Daishinnenkai 2016 Nippon Budokan: Akatsuki no Utage.
- Scandal; January 12–13, 2016; Scandal Arena Tour 2015–2016 "Perfect World
- Mamoru Miyano; 2016; Mamoru Miyano Live Tour 2015–16 ～Generating!～ final at Budokan
- Dir En Grey; February 5–6, 2016; Arche at Nippon Budokan
- iKon; February 15–16, 2016; iKoncert 2016: Showtime Tour
- Symphogear; February 27–28, 2016; Symphogear Live 2016
- YuiKaori; March 12, 2016; Rainbow Canary!! ～Brightest Stage～
- Shouta Aoi; March 13, 2016; Wonder Lab. ~Bokutachi no Sign~
- CNBLUE; May 26–27, 2016; Spring Live 2016, We're Like A Puzzle @Nippon Budokan
- Aya Uchida; August 13, 2016; Aya Uchida Complete Live 〜Colors〜 in Nippon Budokan
- Buono!; August 26, 2016; Buono! Festa 2016 LIVEミニ写真集
- Kalafina; September 16–17, 2016; Kalafina Arena Live 2016
- Queen + Adam Lambert; September 21–23; Queen + Adam Lambert 2016 Summer Festival Tour
- Suzuko Mimori; October 27–28, 2016; Mimori Suzuko Live Tour 2016 "Grand Revue" Final at Nippon Budokan
- Eir Aoi; November 4–5, 2016; Eir Aoi 5th Anniversary Special Live 2016 ～Last Blue～ at Nippon Budokan
- My First Story; November 18, 2016; We're Just Waiting 4 You Tour 2016 Final at Budokan
- Lee Jun-ho; December 3–4, 2016, Junho (From 2PM) Special Encore Concert "Last Hyper Night"

==== 2017 ====
- Asian Kung-Fu Generation; January 10–11, 2017; Tour 2016 – 2017 20th Anniversary Live DVD/Blu-Ray Eizo Sakushin Shu Vol.13
- Mayday; February 3–4, 2017; Re-DNA 2017 Re-issue version
- Journey; February 7, 2017; recorded live CD/DVD Live in Japan 2017
- ClariS; February 10, 2017; ClariS 1st Budōkan Concert ~Futatsu no Kamen to Ushinawareta Taiyō~ (ClariS 1st Budōkan Concert: Two Masks and the Lost Sun)
- Versailles; February 14, 2017; Chateau de Versailles at Nippon Budokan
- The Oral Cigarettes; June 16, 2017; Unofficial Dining Tour 2017 at Nippon Budokan
- Taemin; July 1–2, 2017; Taemin The 1st Stage Nippon Budokan
- Blackpink; July 20, 2017, Japanese Debut Showcase
- After the Rain; August 9–10, 2017; AtR -Clockwise / Anti-Clockwise-
- Poppin'Party (BanG Dream!); August 21, 2017; BanG Dream! 4th Live Miracle Party 2017!
- Aimer: Aimer Live in Budokan "blanc et noir" (SME, 2017) – recorded August 29, 2017
- Dream Theater; September 11, 2017; Back to Budokan 2017
- Jang Wooyoung; December 5–6, 2017; Wooyoung (From 2PM) Solo Tour 2017 "Mada Boku Wa..."

==== 2018 ====
- Nana Mizuki; January 11–21, 2018; Nana Mizuki Live Gate 2018
- Kalafina; January 23, 2018; Kalafina 10th Anniversary Live 2018 at Nippon Budokan
- Lee Jun-ho; February 23–24, 2018; Junho (From 2PM) Winter Special Tour
- coldrain; February 6, 2018; Fateless Japan Tour 2017
- Nogizaka46; April 22, 2018; Rina Ikoma Graduation Concert @ Nippon Budokan
- Winner; April 28, 2018; Winner Japan Tour 2018 ~We'll always be young~
- Mayday; May 19–20, 2018; Mayday Life World Tour
- Airi Suzuki; July 9, 2018; Suzuki Airi 1st Live ~Do me a favor @ Nippon Budokan~
- Lee Jun-ho; August 20–21, 2018; Junho (From 2PM) Solo Tour 2018 Flashlight
- Mariah Carey; October 31 and November 1, 2018; #1's Tour (two sold-out shows)
- iKon; November 6–7, 2018; iKON Japan Tour 2018
- Lee Jun-ho; December 6–8, 2018; Junho (From 2PM) Last Concert "Junho The Best"

==== 2019 ====
- Maaya Uchida; January 1, 2019; Uchida Maaya New Year Live 2019 "take you take me Budokan!!" (sold-out concert)
- Ensemble Stars!; January 13, 2019; Ensemble Stars! Starry Stage 2nd ～in Nippon Budokan～
- Milky Holmes; January 28, 2019; Milky Holmes Final Live Q.E.D.
- Flow; January 30, 2019; 15th Anniversary Final "Flow Live Best 2019 in Nippon Budokan ~Kami Matsuri~"
- Aimyon; February 18, 2019; Aimyon Budokan −1995-
- Roselia, Raise A Suilen, and Poppin'Party (BanG Dream!); February 21–23, 2019; BanG Dream! 7th☆LIVE
- John Mayer; April 10–11, 2019; World Tour 2019
- Inori Minase; June 28–29, 2019; Inori Minase Live Tour 2019 Catch the Rainbow!
- Official Hige Dandism; July 8, 2019; Official Hige Dandism one-man tour 2019 @ Nippon Budokan
- Polkadot Stingray; July 17, 2019; Polfest 45 " #Uchoten One-man" Nippon Budokan (Tokyo)
- Aska; August 21, 2019; Aska Concert Tour 2019 Made in Aska − 40 Years Old – in Nippon Budokan

=== 2020s ===
==== 2020 and 2021 ====
- Fujii Kaze, October 29, 2020, Nan-Nan Show 2020 Help Ever Hurt Never at Nippon Budokan
- Creepy Nuts, November 11 - 12, 2020, Creepy Nuts One Man Live "Katsute Tensai Datta Oretachi e" Nippon Budokan
- Wagakki Band; January 3–4, 2021; Daishinnenkai 2021 Nippon Budokan: Amanoiwato
- Babymetal; January 19 – April 15, 2021; 10 Babymetal Budokan: Doomsday I – X (Metal Resistance: Episode X)
- Pedro; February 13, 2021; Seikatsu to Kioku/ Life and Memory
- Airi Suzuki; October 13, 2021; Suzuki Airi Live 2021 ~26/27~ (鈴木愛理 Live 2021～26/27～)
- Yuzu, October 25, 2021, Yuzu Tour 2021 Utao x Futari in Nippon Budokan.
- Yoasobi; December 4–5, 2021; Nice to Meet You
- Morning Musume; December 13, 2021; Teenage Solution ~Sato Masaki Sotsugyou Special~

==== 2022 ====
- Wagakki Band; January 9, 2022; Daishinnenkai 2022 Nippon Budokan: Yasoukenbunroku
- Char; April 13, 2022; Char 45th Anniversary Concert Special at Nippon Budokan
- Momoiro Clover Z; May 15, 2022; Momoiro Clover Z 6th Album Tour "Shukuten"
- Onew; July 7–8, 2022; Onew Japan 1st Concert Tour ~Life Goes On~
- Lee Jun-ho; August 20–21, 2022; Lee Junho 2022 Fan-Con <Before Midnight>
- Eve; August 29–30, 2022; Kaizin Live Tour
- Vaundy; September 8–9, 2022; one man live "Shinkokyu" at Nippon Budokan
- Kyary Pamyu Pamyu; October 19, 2022; UMA105
- SIRUP; November 11, 2022; Roll & Bounce
- Yuki, December 5–6, 2022, Yuki concert tour "Sounds of Twenty" 2022 Nippon Budokan

==== 2023 ====
- Creepy Nuts: Creepy Nuts Major Debut 5th Anniversary Live "2017–2022" in Nippon Budokan (Onenation, Sony Music Associated, 2023) – recorded November 5, 2022
- Yorushika; February 8–9, 2023; Zense Live 2023
- Reona, March 6, 2023, ReoNa One-Man Concert 2023「Pilgrim」at Nippon Budokan 〜3.6 day 逃げて逢おうね〜
- Porno Graffitti; May 10, 2023; 18th Live Circuit "Akatsuki" Live at Nippon Budokan 2023
- Milet; May 20–21, 2023; Milet Live at Nippon Budokan
- Juice=Juice; May 29, 2023; Juice=Juice 10th Anniversary Concert Tour ~10th Juice at Budokan~
- Ado; August 30, 2023; Ado Japan Tour "Mars"
- Helloween; September 16, 2023; Live at Budokan
- Jonathan Lee; October 3, 2023; Jonathan Lee's Those Songs Through The Years World Tour

==== 2024 ====
- Babababambi; March 14, 2024; #ババババンビ 武道館ワンマンライブ「馬鹿騒ぎ"天下統一」at 日本武道館
- Minami, March 30, 2024, Minami "Joyint in Nippon Budokan"
- Hatsune Miku; March 31, 2024; Miku Fes'24 (Haru) ~Happy 16th Birthday~
- Lisa, April 19–20, 2024; LiVE is Smile Always ~ i Scream @ Nippon Budokan
- A-Mei; May 2–3, 2024; ASMR World Tour
- Tatsuya Kitani, May 14, 2024; Kitani Tatsuya 10th Anniversary Live 彼は天井から見ている at Nippon Budokan
- Fruits Zipper; May 18–19, 2024; Fruits Zipper 2nd Anniversary 超めでたいライブ~New Kawaii~
- Reol; August 17, 2024; Reol One Man Live "No title"
- Wakin Chau; October 7, 2024; The Younger Me Concert Tour
- Ikimonogakari; November 2, 2024; Ikimonogakari "Street Live at Budokan
- Dezert; December 27, 2024; DEZERT SPECIAL ONEMAN LIVE at NIPPON BUDOKAN「君の心臓を触る」
- Momoiro Clover Z; December 31, 2024; 8th Momoiro Uta Gassen ~New Year's Eve of Love~

==== 2025 ====
- Kizu (band); January 6, 2025; 『キズ 単独公演「焔」2025.1.6 日本武道館』
- Aska: Aska Concert Tour 2024–2025 – Who is Aska!? (DADA label, 2025) – triple Blu-ray
- Gero: Goodbye, Budokan (Warner Music Japan, 2025) – multiple DVD and Blu-ray releases
- TrySail; March 1–2, 2025; Lawson presents TrySail 10th Anniversary Shukkou ("Departure") Live 'FlagShip' in Nippon Budokan"
- Masayoshi Ōishi; March 29, 2025; Oishi Budokan Vol.2 ~Masayoshi Oishi One-Man Live at Nippon Budokan~
- Eric Clapton; April 14–27, 2025; 'Live at Budokan 2025' Tour
- Cyndi Lauper; April 22–23, 2025; Girls Just Wanna Have Fun Farewell Tour
- Akira Fuse; May 7, 2025; Akira Fuse 60th Anniversary Live Tour
- Lisa; May 14–15, 2025; LiVE is Smile Always～RiP SERViCE～'
- Poppin'Party (BanG Dream!); May 26, 2025; Poppin'Party 10th Anniversary Live「ホシノコドウ - Hoshi no Kodou」
- Sodagreen; May 29, 2025; Sodagreen 20th A Moment Concert Tour
- Misia; June 8, 2025; The Tour Of Misia 2025 Love Never Dies
- Seiko Matsuda; June 21–22, 2025; 45th Anniversary Seiko Matsuda Concert Tour 2025
- Juice=Juice; June 23, 2025; Juice=Juice Concert Tour 2025 Crimson×Azure Special
- Yuki Chiba; July 3, 2025; Star Live
- Char; July 4, 2025; 'Budokan Live 2025 "70th Session Party"
- Seiko Matsuda; July 11–12, 2025; 45th Anniversary Seiko Matsuda Concert Tour 2025
- Nexz; July 18–19, 2025: 'Live Tour 2025 One Bite'
- Creep Hyp; July 23–24, 2025; Nationwide Tour 2025
- Imase; July 25, 2025; "imase Live 'Have a nice day' in Nippon Budokan"
- iLiFE!; August 27; iLiFE! Oneman Live "ONELiFE! in Budokan iLiFE! Nippon Budokan ワンマンライブ 『ONELiFE!』
- Shota Shimizu; August 29–30, 2025; Live Tour 2025'
- TOGENASHI TOGEARI; September 23, 2025; Togenashi Togeari LIVE in Nippon Budokan (“Sougeki no Sakebi”)
- Hitsujibungaku: Hitsujibungaku Asia Tour 2025 "いま、ここ (Right now, right here.)" Streaming Live 2025.10.10 at 日本武道館 (F.C.L.S, October 10, 2025) – via the band's official YouTube channel
- Ling Tosite Sigure; December 27, 2025; 'Tornado in Budokan'

==== 2027 ====
- HIMEHINA; July 13, 2027; HIMEHINA LIVE 2027 'BUDOKAN'
