= Creepy Nuts One Man Tour 2024 =

2024 concert tour by Creepy Nuts

- Tour by Creepy Nuts
- Location: Japan
- Start date: March 22, 2024
- End date: June 23, 2024
- Legs: 1
- No. of shows: 13
- Attendance: 70,000

Creepy Nuts concert chronology
- Nariwai 2023 Two-Man Tour; Creepy Nuts One Man Tour 2024; Legion One Man Tour

Creepy Nuts One Man Tour 2024 was the 2024 concert tour by Japanese hip-hop duo Creepy Nuts. Begun on March 22 in Kyoto until June 23 in Yokohama, the tour spans 12 venues and 13 performances across the country. The concert tour received around 70,000 attendees.

== Background and overview ==
On January 7, 2024, accommodating the release of Bling-Bang-Bang-Born, the duo announced their 2024 one-man tour, with advanced tickets lottery for their fan club. The double-A-side single "Nidone / Bling-Bang-Bang-Born" have an advanced serial code for the tour's Osaka and both of the Tokyo's shows. The merch was announced a week before the first performance in Kyoto. The Yokohama Arena additional concert was announced on April 7, 2024. The second day of the Tokyo show was broadcast globally on Beyond Live and domestically on CS TV Asahi, which was included in the Blu-ray edition of their 4th album Legion

On the second day of the Tokyo concert, the duo announced their next album's production and their first ever concert at Tokyo Dome.

== Critical reception ==
Billboard Japan's Shin'ichiro Takagi said the tour's setlist was "carefully assembled the theme" and praises the rap skills and turntable skills upon prior experience.

== Setlist ==
- This is the setlist for the second day of the Tokyo show and may changed during the tour.

1. "Biriken"
2. "Hellraiser"
3. "Daten"
4. "Joen Dan'yū-shō"
5. "Bareru!"
6. "Nue no Naku Yoru wa"
7. "Patto Saite Chitte Hai ni"
8. "Spotlight"
9. "Kaoyaku"
10. "Bling-Bang-Bang-Born"(with DJ Matsunaga's DJ Play)
11. "Lazy Boy"
12. "Furai"
13. "Bad Orangez"
14. "Dawn"
15. "Losstime"
16. "Kamisama"
17. "Yūjin A"
18. "Abazure"
19. "Dr. Frankenstein"
20. "Katsute Tensai Datta Oretachi e"
21. "Nobishiro"
22. "Yofukashi no Uta"
23. "Nidone"
24. "Miyagebanashi"
25. "Great Journey"

== Shows ==
List of concerts, showing date, city, country, venue and attendance
Date	City (Note: Labelled as each prefecture the city located showing in promotional material.)	Country	Venue	Attendance
March 22, 2024	Kyoto	Japan	Rohm Theater Kyoto	70,000
March 23, 2024	Nagoya, Aichi	Japan	Nagoya Congress Hall	70,000
March 29, 2024	Niigata	Japan	Niigata Civic Hall	70,000
April 6, 2024	Fukuoka	Japan	Fukuoka Sun Palace	70,000
April 12, 2024	Shizuoka	Japan	Shizuoka Civic Center	70,000
April 14, 2024	Takamatsu, Kagawa	Japan	Sun Port Hall Takamatsu	70,000
April 19, 2024	Sendai, Miyagi	Japan	Sendai Bank Hall Izumiti 21	70,000
April 29, 2024	Sapporo, Hokkaido	Japan	Sapporo Cultural Arts Theater hitaru	70,000
May 10, 2024	Hiroshima	Japan	Ueno Gakuen Hall	70,000
May 14, 2024	Osaka	Japan	Osaka-jo Hall	70,000
June 15, 2024	Tokyo	Japan	Yoyogi National Stadium First Gymnasium	70,000
June 16, 2024	Tokyo	Japan	Yoyogi National Stadium First Gymnasium	70,000
June 23, 2024	Yokohama, Kanagawa	Japan	Yokohama Arena	70,000

- The Yokohama performance is marked as an additional performance

== Personnel ==
Creepy Nuts

- R-Shitei: rapper, vocalist
- DJ Matsunaga: DJ, turntablist.
