= Legion (Creepy Nuts album) =

Studio album by Creepy Nuts
- Released: February 5, 2025
- Genre: Hip-hop
- Length: 40:29
- Language: Japanese
- Label: Onenation; Sony Music Associated
- Producer: DJ Matsunaga

Creepy Nuts chronology
Ensemble Play (2022)	Legion (2025)

Singles from Legion
- 1. "Biriken" Released: October 11, 2023; 2. "Bling-Bang-Bang-Born" Released: January 7, 2024; 3. "Nidone" Released: January 27, 2024; 4. "Otonoke" Released: October 4, 2024; 5. "Doppelgänger" Released: January 24, 2025

Legion is the fourth studio album by Japanese hip-hop duo Creepy Nuts. It was released on February 5, 2025, through Onenation and Sony Music Associated Records, the first album since 2022's Ensemble Play. The album was preceded by five singles, including the Billboard Japan Hot 100 number-one and Billboard Global 200 top-40 singles "Bling-Bang-Bang-Born" and "Otonoke". In support of Legion, the duo embarked on the concert tour the same name throughout Japan from May to September 2025. Commercially, the album peaked at number seven on the Oricon Albums Chart and number three on the Billboard Japan Hot Albums.

== Background ==
On January 7, 2024, Creepy Nuts released the single "Bling-Bang-Bang-Born", an opening theme for the second season of the anime television series Mashle: Magic and Muscles. Following the "BBBB Dance" challenge viral, the song was a massive commercial success, becoming the duo's first number one on both the Oricon Combined Singles Chart and the Billboard Japan Hot 100, as well as peaking at number eight on the Billboard Global 200. Subsequently, the duo released two more singles: the television series Extremely Inappropriate! theme "Nidone", and the anime series Dandadan opening theme "Otonoke"; the latter also topped Billboard Japan Hot 100, and reached number 22 on the US Bubbling Under Hot 100.

== Release and promotion ==
On December 19, 2024, Creepy Nuts announced their fourth studio album, titled Legion, which they also confirmed that previous singles "Biriken", "Bling-Bang-Bang-Born", "Nidone", and "Otonoke" would be part of the album. The next year, on January 17, 2025, the duo revealed that Legion would comprise fifteen tracks, including "Doppelgänger", a theme for the live-action film adaptation of Under Ninja, which was announced to be released as a single on January 24. The duo unveiled the album's track list two days before the album release. The album's cover artwork depicts Super Tamade, a supermarket chain in Osaka Prefecture, one of locations appeared on the music video for "Biriken".

Legion was released to digital music and streaming platforms on February 5, 2025, while the three physical editions–standard, Radio, and Live Blu-ray–would be released a month later, on March 12. The Radio edition features a QR code that allows listeners for the talk sessions, and the Live Blu-ray edition includes Creepy Nuts' 2024 one man tour performed at Yoyogi National Stadium on Blu-ray disc. On March 10, the instrumental edition of the album was released digitally. On the release date, the album's trailer was uploaded, featuring all 15 tracks being mixed by DJ Matsunaga. To promote the album, Creepy Nuts performed most of the album's tracks on music show CDTV Live! Live! on March 17 and ran their Legion One Man Tour, starting in Takamatsu on May 9 and concluded in Osaka on September 14. The music video for "Chxxdai" was uploaded on September 12.

== Accolades ==
Awards and nominations for Legion
Ceremony	Year	Category	Result	Ref.
CD Shop Awards	2026	Grand Prize (Red)	Nominated	
CD Shop Awards	2026	Finalist Award (Red)	Won	

Critics' rankings of Legion
Critic/Publication	Accolade	Rank	Ref.
Teen Vogue	15 Best Non-English Albums of 2025	—N/a	

== Track listing ==
All lyrics are written by R-Shitei, except track 14; all music is composed by DJ Matsunaga.

Legion track listing
No.	Title	Length
1.	"22nd Year of Junior High School" (中学22年生)	2:10
2.	"Doppelgänger"	2:48
3.	"Biriken" (ビリケン)	2:30
4.	"Japanese"	2:46
5.	"Chxxdai" (ちゅだい)	1:38
6.	"Bling-Bang-Bang-Born"	2:49
7.	"Emmanuelle" (エマニエル)	3:02
8.	"Get Higher"	3:38
9.	"The Very Hungry Caterpillar" (はらぺこあおむし)	2:29
10.	"First Penguin"	2:55
11.	"Otonoke" (オトノケ)	3:06
12.	"Nidone" (二度寝)	3:28
13.	"Tsūjōkai" (通常回)	3:09
14.	"Mart"	1:21
15.	"Legion"	2:33
Total length:		40:29

Legion – Live Blu-ray edition (Creepy Nuts One Man Tour 2024 at Yoyogi National Stadium 1st Stadium)
No.	Title	Length
1.	"Biriken"	2:45
2.	"Hellraiser" (ヘルレイザー)	3:41
3.	"Daten" (堕天)	3:17
4.	"Joen Dan'yū-shō" (助演男優賞)	3:17
5.	"Bareru!" (バレる!)	3:09
6.	"Nue no Naku Yoru wa" (ぬえの鳴く夜は)	4:02
7.	"Patto Saite Chitte Hai ni" (パッと咲いて散って灰に)	3:07
8.	"Spotlight" (スポットライト)	3:42
9.	"Kaoyaku" (顔役)	3:04
10.	"Bling-Bang-Bang-Born"	2:47
11.	"Lazy Boy"	3:09
12.	"Furai" (風来)	3:08
13.	"Bad Orangez"	3:50
14.	"Dawn"	3:26
15.	"Losstime" (ロスタイム)	4:27
16.	"Kami-sama" (紙様)	3:20
17.	"Yūjin A" (友人A)	3:07
18.	"Abazure" (阿婆擦れ)	4:46
19.	"Dr. Frankenstein" (Dr.フランケンシュタイン)	2:31
20.	"Katsute Tensai Datta Oretachi e" (かつて天才だった俺たちへ)	3:48
21.	"Nobishiro" (のびしろ)	3:55
22.	"Yofukashi no Uta" (よふかしのうた)	3:48
23.	"Nidone"	3:40
24.	"Miyagebanashi" (土産話)	4:22
25.	"Great Journey" (グレートジャーニー)	4:45
Total length:		159:29

Legion – Radio edition
No.	Title	Length
1.	"Radio Talk"	77:50
Total length:		118:19

Notes

- The instrumental edition features the same track list as the standard edition, but instrumental version.

== Personnel ==
Creepy Nuts

- R-Shitei – vocals (1–13, 15)
- DJ Matsunaga – arrangement

Additional contributors

- Kazuki Isogai – guitar (10–11)
- Alex Tumay – mixing (1, 4, 8–9, 15)
- Masahito Komori – mixing (2, 6, 11–12)
- D.O.I. – mixing (3)
- Bill Zimmerman – mixing (5, 14)
- Erik Madrid – mixing (7, 10, 13)
- Mike Bozzi – mastering

== Charts ==
=== Weekly charts ===
Weekly chart performance for Legion
Chart (2025)	Peak position
Japanese Albums (Oricon)	7
Japanese Combined Albums (Oricon)	7
Japanese Dance & Soul Albums (Oricon)	1
Japanese Hot Albums (Billboard Japan)	3
US World Albums (Billboard)	15

Weekly chart performance for Legion Instrumental
Chart (2025)	Peak position
Japanese Digital Albums (Oricon)	46
Japanese Download Albums (Billboard Japan)	47

=== Monthly charts ===
Monthly chart performance for Legion
Chart (2025)	Position
Japanese Albums (Oricon)	17
Japanese Dance & Soul Albums (Oricon)	1

=== Year-end charts ===
Year-end chart performance for Legion
Chart (2025)	Position
Japanese Hot Albums (Billboard Japan)	31

== Release history ==
Release dates and formats for Legion
Region	Date	Format	Version	Label	Ref.
Various	February 5, 2025	Digital download; streaming	Standard	Onenation; Sony Music Associated	
Various	March 10, 2025	Digital download; streaming	Instrumental	Onenation; Sony Music Associated	
Japan	March 12, 2025	CD; CD+Blu-ray	Live Blu-ray; Radio; standard	Onenation; Sony Music Associated	
