= I've Been Floating Down the Old Green River =

Song performed by Billy Murray

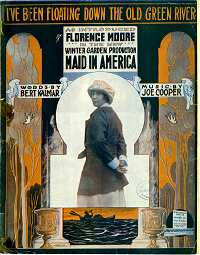
Cover of sheet music for the song (1915)

"I've Been Floating Down the Old Green River" is a 1915 song with words by Bert Kalmar and music by Joe Cooper.

== Background ==
Newspaper ad for Green River

The song is sung from the point of view of a husband who has to explain to his wife why he stayed out until 4:30 in the morning. He states that he has been floating down the old Green River on the good ship "Rock and Rye", where he got "stuck on a bar". The tag line in the lyric is:

I had to drink the whole Green River dry
To get back home to you.

The song is a play on words, as Green River was a popular brand of whiskey at the time.

I've Been Floating Down the Old Green River
"I've Been Floating Down the Old Green River" sung in 1915 by Billy Murray

== Cover versions ==
The popular vocalist Billy Murray recorded the song on March 11, 1915 for Victor Records (catalog No. 17885B). His rendition was sampled in the 2024 hip-hop song "Otonoke" by Japanese duo Creepy Nuts as the opening theme song for the anime Dandadan.

Russ Morgan and His Orchestra recorded the song for Decca Records (catalog No. 24834) in 1949.

Kenny Ball and His Jazzmen included the song on the 1964 album Jazz Band Ball and it was later included in the compilation The Pye Jazz Albums (2003).
