= Mirage (Creepy Nuts song) =

Single by Creepy Nuts
- Language: Japanese
- A-side: "Nemure"
- Released: July 4, 2025
- Genre: Reggaeton
- Length: 2:18
- Label: Onenation; Sony Music Associated
- Composer: DJ Matsunaga
- Lyricist: R-Shitei
- Producer: DJ Matsunaga

Creepy Nuts singles chronology
"Doppelgänger" (2025)	"Mirage" (2025)	"Nemure" (2025)

Music video
- "Mirage" on YouTube

"Mirage" is a song by Japanese hip-hop duo Creepy Nuts. It was released as a single through Onenation and Sony Music Associated Records on July 4, 2025. The song is the duo's first release since their fourth studio album, Legion (2025), and serves as an opening theme for the second season of anime series Call of the Night.

== Background and release ==
In 2022, Creepy Nuts previously performed the opening theme of the first season of anime adaptation of manga series Call of the Night, titled "Daten", and insert song "Losstime". Their 2018 song "Yofukashi no Uta" was also used for the anime series as its ending theme, which the song title inspired the manga's Japanese title, according to the manga's writer and illustrator Kotoyama.

On June 6, 2025, it was announced that Creepy Nuts would return to be in charge of an opening theme for the second season of Call of the Night, titled "Mirage", alongside its release date July 4. The snippet of the song was teased via the main trailer. The duo released the double A-side CD single of the song and the anime's ending theme "Nemure" on September 10.

== Composition ==
In an interview with Weekly Shōnen Sunday, DJ Matsunaga revealed that he started working for the song after finishing their fourth studio album, Legion (2025). Musically, the song is a reggaeton and dancehall track with elements of flute and steelpan. Writing for Real Sound, Tomoyuki Mori described "Mirage" that has strong "Latin flavors" influence and are based on the theme of "staying up late at night". The lyrics reflect the feeling of longing and yearning to reconnect with someone who is always out of reach, metaphorized as "mirage".

== Promotion ==
On July 3, 2025, ahead of the single release, Creepy Nuts premiered the performance video of "Mirage" on digital billboards on buildings around Shibuya Scramble Crossing, Tokyo. The song's accompanying music video, directed by Kazuma Ikeda, uploaded on July 15. The visual expresses the world of mirage, which seems to wander between fantasy and reality. The collaborative music video with the anime was released later on July 25.

== Accolades ==
Awards and nominations for "Mirage"
Ceremony	Year	Award	Result	Ref.
Anime Trending Awards	2026	Opening Theme Song of the Year	Won	
Crunchyroll Anime Awards	2026	Best Opening Sequence	Nominated	
Japan Expo Awards	2026	Daruma for Best Opening	Nominated	

== Track listing ==
- Digital download and streaming
1. "Mirage" (OP Theme to Call of the Night Season 2) – 2:18
2. "Mirage" (instrumental) – 2:18
- CD single
1. "Mirage" – 2:18
2. "Nemure" (眠れ) – 2:25
3. "Mirage" (instrumental) – 2:18
4. "Nemure" (instrumental) – 2:25
- Blu-ray
1. "TV Anime Call of the Night Season 2 Non-Credit Opening Movie" – 1:31
2. "TV Anime Call of the Night Season 2 Non-Credit Ending Movie" – 1:31

== Credits and personnel ==
- Creepy Nuts
  - R-Shitei – vocals, lyrics
  - DJ Matsunaga – composition, arrangement
- Kazuki Isogai – guitar
- Katsuhiro Mafune – bass
- Erick Madrid – mixing
- Mike Bozzi – mastering

== Charts ==
Chart performance for "Mirage"
Chart (2025)	Peak position
Japan (Japan Hot 100)	54
Japan Hot Animation (Billboard Japan)	9
Japan (Oricon)	17
Japan Digital Singles (Oricon)	14
US World Digital Song Sales (Billboard)	7
