= Otonoke =

Single by Creepy Nuts

from the album Legion
- Language: Japanese
- Released: October 4, 2024
- Genre: Hip-hop
- Length: 3:05
- Label: Onenation; Sony Music Associated
- Composer: DJ Matsunaga
- Lyricist: R-Shitei
- Producer: DJ Matsunaga

Creepy Nuts singles chronology
"Nidone" (2024)	"Otonoke" (2024)	"Doppelgänger" (2025)

Alternative cover
- Limited edition cover, depicting Momo Ayase (left) and Okarun (right)

Music video
- "Otonoke" on YouTube

"Otonoke" (Japanese: オトノケ; lit. sound yōkai) is a song by Japanese hip-hop duo Creepy Nuts from their fourth studio album, Legion (2025). It was released as a single on October 4, 2024, through Onenation and Sony Music Associated Records. The song serves as the opening theme for Japanese anime series Dandadan (2024). Commercially, "Otonoke" peaked at number one on the Billboard Japan Hot 100 number 22 on the US Bubbling Under Hot 100, and the World Digital Song Sales.

== Background and release ==
On June 23, 2024, the production committee of the anime Dandadan announced that Creepy Nuts would perform the opening theme song for the anime, titled "Otonoke". One half of the duo R-Shitei described that the song interpreted "how when supernatural beings or spirits possess people, they 'resonate with and connect with pain and sadness', which is very similar to the relationship between music creators and listeners." The snippet of "Otonoke" first featured on the anime's third trailer, previewed on August 20. The duo released the song digitally on October 4, and physically on CD single on December 11.

A month after the release, a user on the website Reddit discovered that the song had artifacts of sampling from a sped and pitched-up excerpt of the 1915 song "I've Been Floating Down the Old Green River" performed by American singer Billy Murray, disproving a popular theory that the song had sampled sounds from the Pikmin series of video games.

== Music video ==
A music video for "Otonoke" premiered on October 18, 2024. Directed by Masaki Watanabe, the chaotic music video expresses the dark atmosphere of the song by using several visual techniques, including Creepy Nuts in phenakistoscope and zoetrope created by 3D scanning as well as "Fatman Scoop-style big head" effects. The collaborated music video with Dandadan was released on October 31.

== Live performances ==
Creepy Nuts debuted the live performance of "Otonoke" at Venue 101 Presents Creepy Nuts the Live on October 5, 2024. They also performed this song at the 66th Japan Record Awards on December 30, 2024.

== Accolades ==
Critics' rankings of "Otonoke"
Critic/Publication	Accolade	Rank	Ref.
Anime News Network	The Best Songs of 2024	—N/a	
Nialler9	Filmore!'s Favourite Songs of 2024	—N/a	
Polygon	The 6 Best Anime Openings of 2024	—N/a	

Awards and nominations for "Otonoke"
Ceremony	Year	Award	Result	Ref.
Abema Anime Trend Awards	2024	Opening Animation Award	Won	
AnimaniA Awards	2025	Best Anime Song	Nominated	
Anime Grand Prix	2025	Best Theme Song	2nd place	
Anime Trending Awards	2025	Opening Theme Song of the Year	Won	
Crunchyroll Anime Awards	2025	Best Anime Song	Won	
Crunchyroll Anime Awards	2025	Best Opening Sequence	Won	
Japan Expo Awards	2025	Daruma for Best Opening	Won	
Music Awards Japan	2026	Top Japanese Song in Europe	Nominated	
Music Awards Japan	2026	Top Japanese Song in North America	Nominated	
Music Awards Japan	2026	Top Japanese Song in Latin America	Nominated	
Reiwa Anisong Awards	2025	Best Work Award	Nominated	

== Track listing ==
- CD single, digital download and streaming
1. "Otonoke" (オトノケ) – 3:05
2. "Otonoke" (instrumental) – 3:05
- Blu-ray
1. "Otonoke" (music video) – 3:16
2. "Otonoke" (Dandadan collaboration music video) – 3:10
3. "TV Anime Dandadan Non-Credit OP (cool) Movie" – 1:31

== Personnel ==
- R-Shitei – vocals, lyrics
- DJ Matsunaga – composition, arrangement
- Kazuki Isogai – guitar
- Masahito Komori – mixing
- Mike Bozzi – mastering

== Charts ==
=== Weekly charts ===
Weekly chart performance for "Otonoke"
Chart (2024)	Peak position
Global 200 (Billboard)	37
Japan (Japan Hot 100)	1
Japan Hot Animation (Billboard Japan)	1
Japan (Oricon)	19
Japan Combined Singles (Oricon)	2
Japan Anime Singles (Oricon)	7
New Zealand Hot Singles (RMNZ)	4
US Bubbling Under Hot 100 (Billboard)	22
US World Digital Song Sales (Billboard)	1

=== Monthly charts ===
Monthly chart performance for "Otonoke"
Chart (2024)	Position
Japan (Oricon)	32

=== Year-end charts ===
2024 year-end chart performance for "Otonoke"
Chart (2024)	Position
Japan (Japan Hot 100)	92
Japan Hot Animation (Billboard Japan)	19

2025 year-end chart performance for "Otonoke"
Chart (2025)	Position
Global Excl. US (Billboard)	160
Japan (Japan Hot 100)	16
Japan Hot Animation (Billboard Japan)	6

== Certifications ==
Certifications for "Otonoke"
Region	Certification	Certified units/sales
Japan (RIAJ)	Gold	100,000^{*}
Mexico (AMPROFON) Instrumental	Gold	70,000^{‡}
United States (RIAA)	Gold	500,000^{‡}
Streaming
Japan (RIAJ)	2× Platinum	200,000,000^{†}
^{*} Sales figures based on certification alone.^{‡} Sales+streaming figures based on certification alone.^{†} Streaming-only figures based on certification alone.

== See also ==
- List of Hot 100 number-one singles of 2024 (Japan)
