= Katsute Tensai Datta Oretachi e =

- Digital and Live DVD cover

EP by Creepy Nuts
- Released: August 26, 2020
- Length: 26:49
- Language: Japanese
- Label: Onenation; Sony Music Associated
- Producer: DJ Matsunaga; Seiji Kameda

Creepy Nuts chronology
Yofukashi no Uta (2019)	Katsute Tensai Datta Oretachi e (2020)	Case (2021)

Singles from Katsute Tensai Datta Oretachi e
- 1. "Otona" Released: February 5, 2020; 2. "Santora" Released: July 1, 2020

Katsute Tensai Datta Oretachi e (Japanese: かつて天才だった俺たちへ; lit. 'To Us Former Prodigies') is the fourth extended play (Note: Classified as "mini-album") by Japanese hip-hop duo Creepy Nuts. It was released through Onenation and Sony Music Associated Records on August 26, 2020, the first work since the 2019 EP Yofukashi no Uta. The EP was preceded by two singles: "Otona", a theme for TV Tokyo Japanese drama Kotaki Kyōdai to Shikuhakku; and "Santora", a collaboration with actor and singer Masaki Suda.

== Background ==
Katsute Tensai Datta Oretachi e was in the plan during the COVID-19 pandemic, but the production of the album started in June 2020, after the lockdown period due to COVID-19 ended, which granted a unique chance for them to refine their songs.

== Release and promotion ==
Creepy Nuts announced their EP titled Katsute Tensai Datta Oretachi e at their All Night Nippon 0 on July 1, 2020, to be released on August 26. The EP came in two physical editions: Live DVD, including the duo's performances of the duo's Yofukashi no Uta One Man Tour at Shin-Kiba Studio Coast in December 2019; and Radio, featuring talk session between the tracks, reminiscing about radio program. The EP's track listing and cover artworks were revealed on July 22, comprised seven tracks. To commemorate Katsute Tensai Datta Oretachi e, the duo held a two-day Nippon Budokan one-off concert of the same name in November 2020, and a one man tour of the same name from January to March 2021.

== Accolades ==
Awards and nominations for Katsute Tensai Datta Oretachi e
Ceremony	Year	Category	Result	Ref.
CD Shop Awards	2021	Grand Prize (Red)	Nominated	
CD Shop Awards	2021	Finalist Award (Red)	Won	

== Track listing ==
All lyrics are written by R-Shitei, except track 4; all music is composed and arranged by DJ Matsunaga, except where noted.

Katsute Tensai Datta Oretachi e track listing
No.	Title	Lyrics	Music	Arrangement	Length
1.	"Hellraiser" (ヘルレイザー)			DJ Matsunaga; Daisuke Kawaguchi	3:44
2.	"Minimashi Hōichi Style" (耳無し芳一Style)				3:20
3.	"Otona" (オトナ)				3:19
4.	"Nichiyōbi yori no Shisha" (日曜日よりの使者; with Masaki Suda)	Hiroto Kōmoto	Kōmoto	Seiji Kameda	6:08
5.	"Santora" (サントラ; with Masaki Suda)			DJ Matsunaga; Kawaguchi	4:09
6.	"Dr.Frankenstein" (Dr.フランケンシュタイン)				2:32
7.	"Katsute Tensai Datta Oretachi e" (かつて天才だった俺たちへ)				3:34
Total length:					26:49

Katsute Tensai Datta Oretachi e – Radio edition
No.	Title	Length
1.	"OP Talk" (OPトーク)	8:17
2.	"Hellraiser"	3:44
3.	"Talk: Saikyō Tattoo Man" (トーク:最強タトゥーマン)	5:53
4.	"Minimashi Hōichi Style"	3:20
5.	"Talk: Otona Taiketsu" (トーク:オトナ対決)	3:45
6.	"Otona"	3:19
7.	"Talk: Jimoto Osusume Spot 2020" (トーク:地元おすすめスポット2020)	4:49
8.	"Nichiyōbi yori no Shisha" (with Masaki Suda)	6:08
9.	"Talk: Soundtrack no Hanashi" (トーク:サントラの話)	5:44
10.	"Santora" (with Masaki Suda)	4:09
11.	"Talk: Rapper Frankenstein" (トーク:ラッパーフランケンシュタイン)	5:20
12.	"Dr.Frankenstein" (Dr.フランケンシュタイン)	2:32
13.	"Talk: Tensai Datta Koro" (トーク:天才だった頃)	4:46
14.	"Katsute Tensai Datta Oretachi e"	3:34
15.	"ED Talk" (EDトーク)	3:04
Total length:		68:30

Katsute Tensai Datta Oretachi e – Live DVD edition (Creepy Nuts One Man Tour Yofukashi no Uta at Shin-Kiba Studio Coast)
No.	Title	Length
1.	"Ita no Ue no Mamono" (板の上の魔物)
2.	"Terentekuda" (手練手管)
3.	"Kami-sama" (紙様)
4.	"Yofukashi no Uta" (よふかしのうた)
5.	"Inu mo Kuwanai" (犬も食わない)
6.	"Major Debut Shinan" (メジャーデビュー指南)
7.	"Abazure" (阿婆擦れ)
8.	"Trench Coat Mafia" (トレンチコートマフィア)
9.	"Tsuki ni Tōboe" (月に遠吠え)
10.	"Great Journey" (グレートジャーニー)
11.	"Spotlight" (スポットライト)
12.	"Nariwai" (生業)
Total length:		101:03

== Charts ==
=== Weekly charts ===
Weekly chart performance for Katsute Tensai Datta Oretachi e
Chart (2025)	Peak position
Japanese Albums (Oricon)	7
Japanese Combined Albums (Oricon)	2
Japanese Hot Albums (Billboard Japan)	2

=== Monthly charts ===
Monthly chart performance for Katsute Tensai Datta Oretachi e
Chart (2025)	Position
Japanese Albums (Oricon)	10

== Release history ==
Release dates and formats for Katsute Tensai Datta Oretachi e
Region	Date	Format	Version	Label	Ref.
Various	September 7, 2022	Digital download; streaming	Digital	Onenation; Sony Music Associated	
Japan	September 7, 2022	CD; CD+Blu-ray	Radio; Blu-ray Live	Onenation; Sony Music Associated	
