= Creepy Nuts Major Debut 5th Anniversary Live "2017–2022" in Nippon Budokan =

Video by Creepy Nuts
- Released: July 19, 2023
- Recorded: November 5, 2022
- Studio: Nippon Budokan
- Length: 157:00
- Language: Japanese
- Label: Onenation; Sony Music Associated

Creepy Nuts chronology
Creepy Nuts no All Night Nippon "The Live 2022": Orera no Roots wa Aku made Radio da to wa It-te-O-ki-tai ze! (2023)	Creepy Nuts Major Debut 5th Anniversary Live "2017–2022" in Nippon Budokan (2023)

Creepy Nuts Major Debut 5th Anniversary Live "2017–2022" in Nippon Budokan is the third video album by Japanese hip-hop duo Creepy Nuts, released on July 13, 2023, through Onenation and Sony Music Associated Records. It is a Blu-ray recording of the fifth anniversary of their major-label debut held at Nippon Budokan on November 5, 2022.

== Background ==
The video is a Blu-ray disc recording of Creepy Nuts concert to commemorate the 5th anniversary of their major-label debut on November 5, 2022, at Nippon Budokan, Tokyo. The concert itself was announced after the special live release to promote Ensemble Play on September 7, 2022. The live, which was broadcast on CS TV Asahi live, is a special live where they traced back their activities since the formation of the duo, performing songs rarely performed on their regular tours. The live album was announced on June 6, 2023

== Release and promotion ==
The Blu-ray sets come in 2 variants: a standard version, including the Blu-ray of the concert, behind the scenes, directed by Hiroya Brian Nakano and interview footage from Shin'ichiro "Jet" Takagi; and a limited edition, additionally including a box set of their fifth anniversary's merchandise. To promote the live Blu-ray discs, the duo uploaded three songs from the live work to their official YouTube channel, which are "Miyagebanashi", "Bad Orangez" and "Major Debut Shinan".

== Track listing ==
All lyrics are written by R-Shitei; all music is composed by DJ Matsunaga.

Creepy Nuts Major Debut 5th Anniversary Live "2017–2022" in Nippon Budokan track listing
No.	Title	Length
1.	"Major Debut Shinan" (メジャーデビュー指南)
2.	"Hellraiser" (ヘルレイザー)
3.	"Shin-Gōhōteki Tobikata no Susume" (新・合法的トビ方ノススメ)
4.	"Joen Dan'yū-shō" (Spark!Sound!Show remix; 助演男優賞 (SPARK!!SOUND!!SHOW!!時として主役を喰っちまうRemix))
5.	"Nue no Naku Yoru wa" (ぬえの鳴く夜は)
6.	"Dotchi" (どっち)
7.	"Kaiko" (かいこ)
8.	"Abazure" (阿婆擦れ)
9.	"Nariwai" (生業)
10.	"Setsuna" (刹那)
11.	"Trench Coat Mafia" (トレンチコートマフィア)
12.	"15-Sai" (15才)
13.	"Digital Tattoo" (デジタルタトゥー)
14.	"Lazy Boy"
15.	"Bad Orangez"
16.	"Nobishiro" (のびしろ)
17.	"Miyagebanashi" (土産話)
18.	"Mirai Yosōzu" (未来予想図)
19.	"Daga Sore de Ii" (だがそれでいい)
20.	"Behind the Scenes & Interview"
Total length:		157:00

== Release history ==
Release dates and formats for Creepy Nuts Major Debut 5th Anniversary Live "2017–2022" in Nippon Budokan
Region	Date	Format	Version	Label	Ref.
Japan	July 19, 2023	Blu-ray	Standard; limited	Onenation; Sony Music Associated	
