= Doppelgänger (song) =

Single by Creepy Nuts

from the album Legion
- Language: Japanese
- Released: January 24, 2025
- Length: 2:48
- Label: Onenation; Sony Music Associated
- Composer: DJ Matsunaga
- Lyricist: R-Shitei
- Producer: DJ Matsunaga

Creepy Nuts singles chronology
| "Otonoke" (2024) | "Doppelgänger" (2025) | "Mirage" (2025) |

Music video
- "Doppelgänger" on YouTube

"Doppelgänger" is a song by Japanese hip-hop duo Creepy Nuts from their fourth studio album, Legion (2025). It was released by Onenation and Sony Music Associated Records on January 24, 2025. The song served as the theme for the live-action film adaptation of manga series Under Ninja.

== Background and release ==
On November 26, 2024, it was announced that Creepy Nuts would perform the theme song for the live-action film adaptation of Kengo Hanazawa's manga series Under Ninja, titled "Doppelgänger". The song was first previewed on the film's second trailer video. "Doppelgänger" was released digitally on January 24, 2025, the same day as Under Ninja premiere in Japan, and was included on Creepy Nuts' fourth studio album, Legion (2025). Hiroya Brian Nakano handles the single's cover artwork and visualizer, the latter premiered on February 5, the same day as its parent album's digital release. Daiki Kamoshita directed the song's music video, premiered on March 6.

== Composition and reception ==
"Doppelgänger" features four-to-the-floor beats and expresses various sides of doppelgänger. Fans pointed out that the song had sampled R-Shitei's song "Dr. Strangelab" from his album Second Opinion, produced by DJ Matsunaga, which he later revealed that it was an accident. Eriko Ishii of Real Sound commented that the song "quite lacking in color, with only a hard four-on-the-floor beat close to BPM 160 and words spit out as if chased by the high-speed beat" and "the balance between danger and humor is perfect."

== Personnel ==
- R-Shitei – vocals, lyrics
- DJ Matsunaga – composition, arrangement
- Masahito Komori – mixing
- Mike Bozzi – mastering

== Charts ==
=== Weekly charts ===
Weekly chart performance for "Doppelgänger"
| Chart (2025) | Peak position |
|---|---|
| Japan (Japan Hot 100) | 15 |
| Japan Combined Singles (Oricon) | 19 |

=== Year-end charts ===
2025 year-end chart performance for "Doppelgänger"
| Chart (2025) | Position |
|---|---|
| Japan (Japan Hot 100) | 90 |

== Certifications ==
Certifications for "Doppelgänger"
| Region | Certification | Certified units/sales |
Streaming
| Japan (RIAJ) | Gold | 50,000,000^{†} |
^{†} Streaming-only figures based on certification alone.
