= Oricon Combined Singles Chart =

Weekly national singles chart by Oricon

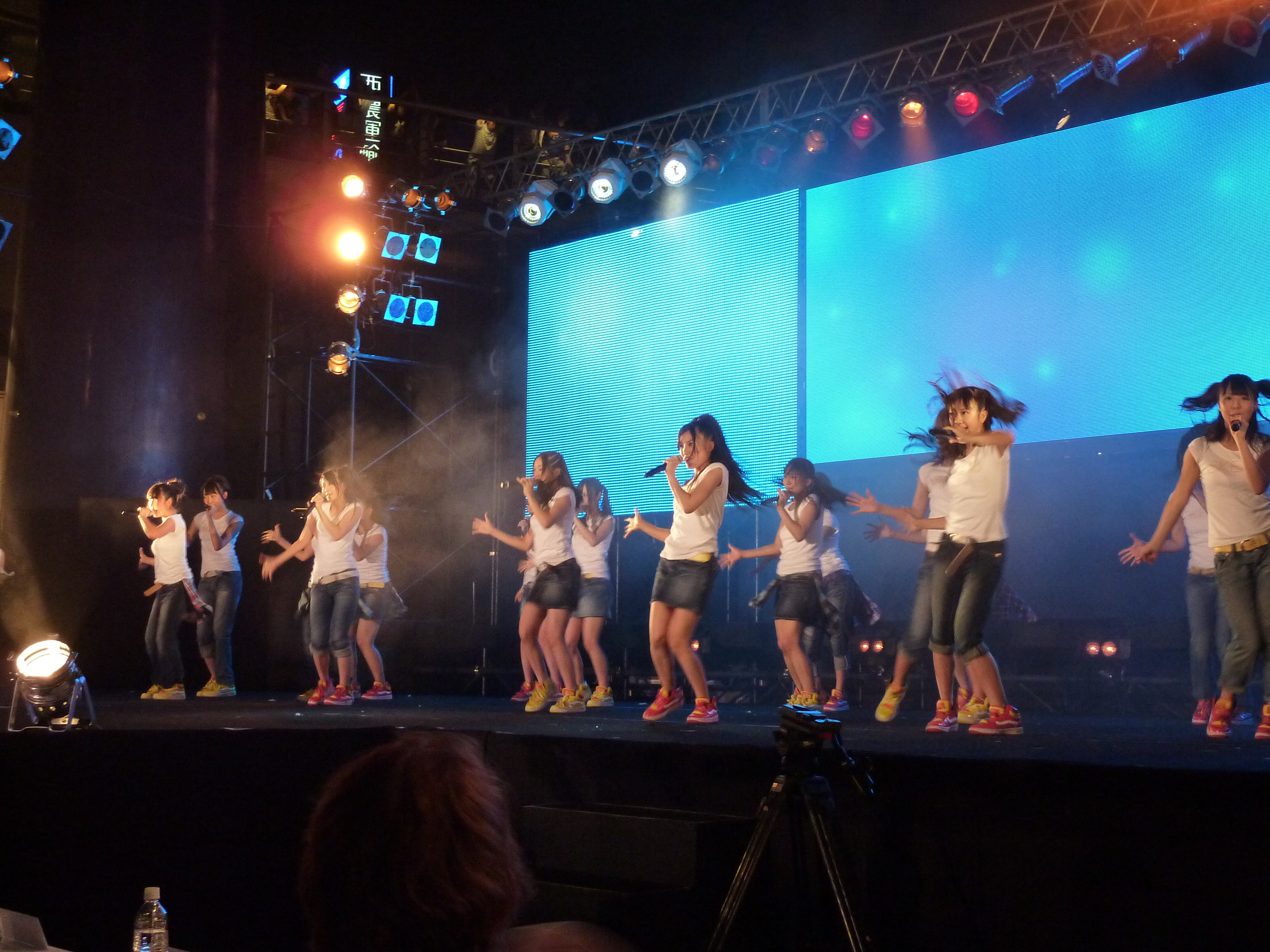
SKE48's "Stand by You" topped the first Oricon Combined Singles Chart in December 2018.

The Oricon Combined Singles Chart (Japanese: オリコン合算シングルランキング, Hepburn: Orikon Gassan Shinguru Rankingu) is a record chart released weekly by Oricon, a major provider of information on the Japanese music industry. First published on December 24, 2018, it ranks the top fifty singles in Japan based on an album-equivalent unit system factoring physical CD sales, digital downloads, and streaming. It competes with the Billboard Japan Hot 100.

Until 2015, Oricon only released charts based on physical CD sales. In the 2010s, this chart was largely dominated by idol groups such as AKB48, who had many customers purchasing their singles for bundled goods instead of the songs. The lack of accuracy in what songs received the most listens resulted in Oricon losing popularity to Billboard Japan's multi-factored charts. Oricon established the Digital Singles Chart in 2016, which only counted digital downloads. Alongside a streaming-only and the Combined Albums Charts, the Combined Singles Chart was subsequently launched in 2018.

== History ==
=== 2000s–2017: Background ===
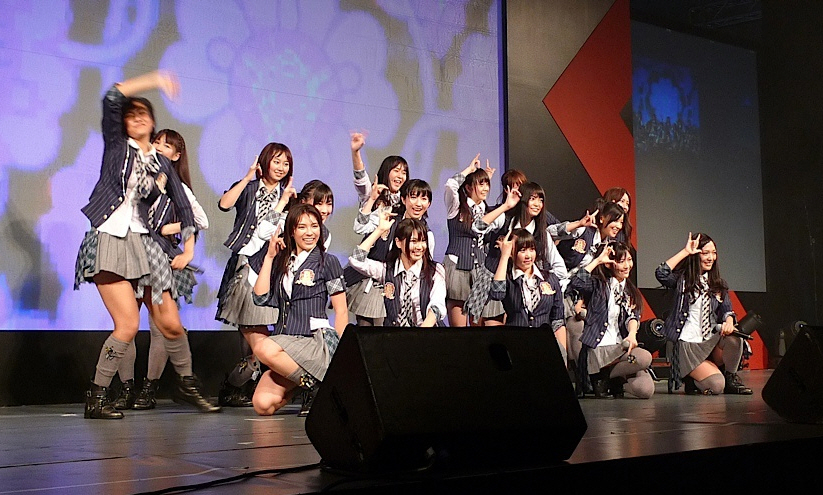
In the 2010s, the Oricon Singles Chart lost popularity to the Billboard Japan Hot 100. Since Oricon's chart only accounted for CD sales, groups like AKB48 (pictured) topped the chart by selling many copies, even if the songs were not the most listened-to. The Combined Singles Chart was subsequently established.

Before 2015, Oricon only published singles and albums charts based on physical CD sales. Comparatively to other countries, Japan's physical music industry has dominated over digital sales even in the 2000s. In 2009, the Recording Industry Association of Japan (RIAJ) reported that the production of CDs accounted to a total worth of 249 billion yen, in comparison to 91 billion from digital distribution; however, the digital figures were gradually growing. Though CD singles were still more popular, the rise of digital music downloads and chaku-uta (ringtones) spurred discussion at Oricon to create a chart combining the different sales methods, which proved unfruitful. Oricon CEO Sōkō Koike told Asahi: "For distributions charts, we have no choice but to rely on announcements from the labels. Since we can't set up measures for independent verification like we do at records stores, its difficult to create a combined chart".

In the latter half of the 2010s, the relevance for multi-factors charts rose when idol group AKB48 began to consistently hold the top spots of Oricon's chart with singles that were sold as bundles with event tickets. The top four positions on Oricon's 2017 year-end chart were all taken by AKB48, something that was not reflected in other rankings such as that of the download site RecoChoku, which gave the top spots to "Koi" by Gen Hoshino and "Hanabi" by Mr. Children. According to music journalist Sōichirō Matsutani, Oricon's lack of accuracy in ranking what songs actually received the most listens caused a downfall in their popularity among media outlets, who began to prefer the multi-factored reports of Billboard Japan and their Hot 100 chart. Fellow journalist Tomonori Shiba wrote that customers who purchase CD singles for bundled bonuses had become an obvious part of the Japanese music market, and found that hit songs were not synonymous with selling the most copies, culminating in the Oricon Singles Chart failing to fulfill its purpose.

Back in 2015, CEO Koike reiterated that Oricon would not add digital factors into the Singles Chart. He argued that such a formula would not be of "societal interest" when artists like Johnny & Associates groups have policies to not release songs digitally, but said that they would continue to experiment. In 2016—the year after—Oricon launched a download-only albums chart called the Digital Albums Chart, separate from the main ranking, which was followed by the Digital Singles Chart the next year.

=== 2018–present: Establishment and milestones ===
Asahi reported in January 2018 that Oricon intended to launch their first combined chart. Alongside a streaming-only component chart, the Combined Albums and Singles Charts were officially announced on August 29, 2018, and were set to combine CD sales, digital downloads, and streams. The first issue of the Oricon Combined Singles Chart was published on December 24, 2018; the inaugural number one was "Stand by You" by SKE48, a sister group to AKB48. In March 2019, AKB48's "Jiwaru Days" became the first single to chart with over 100,000 points. Upon the entry of Kenshi Yonezu's "M87" in January 2024, one hundred singles have reached the milestone. In September 2021, "Yoru ni Kakeru" by the duo Yoasobi became the first song to chart with over 200,000 points; only two months after, "Pretender" by Official Hige Dandism became the second single to reach the milestone.

== Methodology ==
The Oricon Combined Singles Chart weekly compiles the top fifty albums in Japan based on Monday-to-Sunday CD single sales, digital downloads, and streams. It uses an album-equivalent unit system, where to earn one point a single must receive: one CD single sale; one download of a single itself; or 300 streams. Downloads of songs included on a single are added together; the result after dividing this number by 2.5 are added as points.

As of August 2024, numbers for digital downloads are taken from iTunes, Amazon Music, the official Oricon store, RecoChoku-owned services, Avex's Mu-mo, Music.jp, and Mora. Streaming statistics are adapted from Apple Music, Amazon, AWA, Au Smartpass, KKBox, Spotify, Tower Records Music, YouTube and YouTube Music, Line Music, and Rakuten Music. CD sales are reported from various record stores, rental stores, electronics stores, convenience stores, and online shopping sites.

== Number-ones by year ==
Key
†	Indicates the highest score of all year-end charts

List of year-end number ones on the Oricon Combined Singles Chart
Year	Album	Artist	Points	Ref.
2019	"Sustainable"	AKB48	1,416,189	
2020	"Imitation Rain" / "D.D."^{[a]}	SixTones and Snow Man	1,780,306	
2021	"Butter"	BTS	1,809,650	
2022	"Ichizu" / "Sakayume"^{[a]}	King Gnu	1,456,349	
2023	"Idol"	Yoasobi	2,274,528	
2024	"Nidone" / "Bling-Bang-Bang-Born"^{[a]}	Creepy Nuts	2,493,509†	
2025	"Rose"	Hana	1,777,793	

a. Double A-sided single
