= Bling-Bang-Bang-Born =

Single by Creepy Nuts

from the album Legion
- Language: Japanese; English
- A-side: "Nidone"
- Released: January 7, 2024
- Genre: Jersey club; hip-hop
- Length: 2:48
- Label: Onenation; Sony Music Associated
- Composer: DJ Matsunaga
- Lyricist: R-Shitei
- Producer: DJ Matsunaga

Creepy Nuts singles chronology
"Biriken" (2023)	"Bling-Bang-Bang-Born" (2024)	"Nidone" (2024)

Music video
- "Bling-Bang-Bang-Born" on YouTube

"Bling-Bang-Bang-Born" is a song by Japanese hip-hop duo Creepy Nuts from their fourth studio album, Legion (2025). It was released as a single on January 7, 2024, through Onenation and Sony Music Associated Records. The song served as the opening theme for the second season of the anime television series Mashle: Magic and Muscles, subtitled The Divine Visionary Candidate Exam.

The song gained popularity in Japan and internationally through the "BBBB Dance" Internet challenge, resulting in the song peaking at number eight on the Billboard Global 200. In Japan, the song reached their first number one on both Billboard Japan Hot 100 for 19 non-consecutive weeks, the second longest-running number one in history after Yoasobi's "Idol" (22 weeks), and Oricon Combined Singles Chart for four non-consecutive weeks. The song was the best performing songs in Japan in 2024, and certified diamond for streaming by the Recording Industry Association of Japan (RIAJ).

== Background and release ==
On November 11, 2023, it was announced that Creepy Nuts would perform the opening theme, titled "Bling-Bang-Bang-Born", for the second season of Mashle: Magic and Muscles. The song became available on digital music and streaming platforms on January 7, 2024. The music video, collaborated with Mashle, was uploaded on March 3. Subsequently, the single was released alongside "Nidone" as a double A-side CD single on March 20.

== Composition ==
"Bling-Bang-Bang-Born" is a Jersey club track, depicting the protagonist Mash Burnedead, a young man who was born without magic in a magical world, fighting against a dark magical organization; the duo personally found Mash's predicament relatable to their careers.

== Live performances ==
Creepy Nuts debuted the performance of "Bling-Bang-Bang-Born" at The Weekly 99 Music on March 3, 2024. The duo also performed the song at the 66th Japan Record Awards on December 30 and 75th NHK Kōhaku Uta Gassen the next day, as their first appearance of the television special.

== Accolades ==
Critics' rankings of "Bling-Bang-Bang-Born"
Critic/Publication	Accolade	Rank	Ref.
Anime News Network	The Best Songs of 2024	—N/a	
Polygon	The 6 Best Anime Openings of 2024	—N/a	

Awards and nominations for "Bling-Bang-Bang-Born"
Ceremony	Year	Award	Result	Ref.
Abema Anime Trend Awards	2024	Anime Song Award	Won	
AMD Awards	2025	Excellence Award	Won	
AnimaniA Awards	2025	Best Anime Song	Nominated	
Anime Grand Prix	2024	Best Theme Song	7th place	
Anime Trending Awards	2025	Opening Theme Song of the Year	Nominated	
Crunchyroll Anime Awards	2025	Best Anime Song	Nominated	
Crunchyroll Anime Awards	2025	Best Opening Sequence	Nominated	
Japan Expo Awards	2025	Daruma for Best Opening	Nominated	
Japan Gold Disc Award	2025	Song of the Year by Download (Japan)	Won	
Japan Gold Disc Award	2025	Best 3 Songs by Download	Won	
Japan Gold Disc Award	2025	Song of the Year by Streaming (Japan)	Won	
Japan Gold Disc Award	2025	Best 5 Songs by Streaming	Won	
Japan Record Awards	2024	Grand Prix	Nominated	
Japan Record Awards	2024	Excellent Awards	Won	
JASRAC Awards	2025	Silver Prize	Won	
JASRAC Awards	2026	Bronze Prize	Won	
MTV Video Music Awards Japan	2025	Song of the Year	Won	
Music Awards Japan	2025	Song of the Year	Won	
Music Awards Japan	2025	Best Japanese Song	Won	
Music Awards Japan	2025	Best Japanese Hip Hop/Rap Song	Won	
Music Awards Japan	2025	Best Japanese Dance Pop Song	Won	
Music Awards Japan	2025	Best Anime Song	Nominated	
Music Awards Japan	2025	Best Music Video	Nominated	
Music Awards Japan	2025	Best Viral Song	Won	
Music Awards Japan	2025	Best Japanese Song in Asia	Nominated	
Music Awards Japan	2025	Best Japanese Song in Europe	Won	
Music Awards Japan	2025	Best Japanese Song in North America	Won	
Music Awards Japan	2025	Best Japanese Song in Latin America	Won	
Music Awards Japan	2025	Best of Listeners' Choice: Japanese Song	Nominated	
Music Awards Japan	2025	Karaoke of the Year: J-Pop	Nominated	
Reiwa Anisong Awards	2025	Best Work Award	Won	
Reiwa Anisong Awards	2025	Best Anime Song Award	Won	
TikTok First Half Trend Awards	2024	Special Award	Won	
U-Can New Words and Buzzwords Awards	2024	New Words and Buzzwords Awards	Nominated	
Yahoo! Japan Search Awards	2024	Music Category	Won	

== Track listing ==
- Digital download and streaming
1. "Bling-Bang-Bang-Born" – 2:48
2. "Bling-Bang-Bang-Born" (instrumental) – 2:48
- CD single (first production limited edition, regular edition)
1. "Nidone" (二度寝) – 3:29
2. "Bling-Bang-Bang-Born" – 2:50
3. "Nidone" (instrumental) – 3:29
4. "Bling-Bang-Bang-Born" (instrumental) – 2:50
- CD single (period production limited edition)
1. "Bling-Bang-Bang-Born" – 2:50
2. "Nidone" – 3:29
3. "Bling-Bang-Bang-Born" (instrumental) – 2:50
4. "Nidone" (instrumental) – 3:29
- Blu-ray (first production limited edition) — Creepy Nuts One Man Tour Ensemble Play at Saitama Super Arena
1. "2Way Nice Guy" – 3:48
2. "Joen Dan'yū-shō" – 3:47
3. "Teren Tekuda" – 3:28
4. "Spotlight" – 4:01
5. "Patto Saite Chitte Hai ni" – 3:18
6. "Santora" – 4:21
7. "Mimi Nashi Hōichi Style" – 3:40
8. "Dawn" – 3:33
9. "Daten" – 2:58
10. "Yofukashino Uta" – 4:04
11. "Inu mo Kuwanai" – 3:13
12. "Kami-sama" – 3:49
13. "Madman" – 1:36
14. "Yūjin A" – 3:13
15. "Front 9 Ban" – 3:54
16. "Losstime" – 3:49
17. "Katsute Tensai Datta Oretachi e" – 4:11
18. "Bad Orangez" – 3:53
19. "Great Journey" – 4:19
20. "Miyagebanashi" – 5:21
21. "Baka Majime" – 3:06
22. "Nobishiro" – 5:17
23. "Behind the Scenes of Creepy Nuts in Saitama Super Arena" – 29:33
- Blu-ray (period production limited edition)
1. "TV Anime Mashle: Magic and Muscles – The Divine Visionary Candidate Exam Non-Credit OP Video" – 1:29

== Personnel ==
- R-Shitei – vocals, lyrics
- DJ Matsunaga – composition, arrangement
- Masahito Komori – mixing
- Mike Bozzi – mastering

== Charts ==
=== Weekly charts ===
Weekly chart performance for "Bling-Bang-Bang-Born"
Chart (2024)	Peak position
France (SNEP)	173
Germany Download (Official German Charts)	44
Global 200 (Billboard)	8
Hong Kong (Billboard)	24
Japan (Japan Hot 100)	1
Japan Hot Animation (Billboard Japan)	1
Japan (Oricon)	6
Japan Combined Singles (Oricon)	1
Japan Anime Singles (Oricon)	4
New Zealand Hot Singles (RMNZ)	12
Singapore Regional (RIAS)	13
South Korea (Circle)	188
Taiwan (Billboard)	2
US World Digital Song Sales (Billboard)	3

=== Monthly charts ===
Monthly chart performance for "Bling-Bang-Bang-Born"
Chart (2024)	Position
Japan (Oricon)	18
Japan Anime Singles (Oricon)	5

=== Year-end charts ===
2024 year-end chart performance for "Bling-Bang-Bang-Born"
Chart (2024)	Position
Global 200 (Billboard)	67
Japan (Japan Hot 100)	1
Japan Hot Animation (Billboard Japan)	1
Japan Combined Singles (Oricon)	1

2025 year-end chart performance for "Bling-Bang-Bang-Born"
Chart (2025)	Position
Japan (Japan Hot 100)	19
Japan Hot Animation (Billboard Japan)	7

== Certifications and sales ==
Certifications and sales for "Bling-Bang-Bang-Born"
Region	Certification	Certified units/sales
France (SNEP)	Gold	100,000^{‡}
Japan Physical	—	24,118
Japan (RIAJ) Digital	Platinum	250,000^{*}
Mexico (AMPROFON)	Gold	70,000^{‡}
Poland (ZPAV)	Gold	25,000^{‡}
United States (RIAA)	Gold	500,000^{‡}
Streaming
Japan (RIAJ)	Diamond	500,000,000^{†}
^{*} Sales figures based on certification alone.^{‡} Sales+streaming figures based on certification alone.^{†} Streaming-only figures based on certification alone.

== See also ==
- List of Hot 100 number-one singles of 2024 (Japan)
