= Extremely Inappropriate! =

2024 Japanese television series

- 不適切にもほどがある!
- Genre: Drama; Comedy; Musical
- Written by: Kankurō Kudō
- Starring: Sadawo Abe; Riisa Naka; Hayato Isomura; Yuumi Kawai; Manato Sakamoto; Yō Yoshida
- Opening theme: "Nidone" by Creepy Nuts
- Country of origin: Japan
- Original language: Japanese
- No. of episodes: 10

Production
- Executive producer: Aki Isoyama
- Production company: TBS Sparkle

Original release
- Network: TBS
- Release: January 26 – March 29, 2024

Extremely Inappropriate! (Japanese: 不適切にもほどがある!, Hepburn: Futekisetsu ni mo Hodo ga Aru!), popularly known as Futehodo, is a 2024 Japanese comedy musical drama television series about a man who time travels back-and-forth between 1986 (Showa era) and 2024 (Reiwa era), where he finds that his Shōwa-era way of being conflicts with contemporary Japanese society.

The series is noted for contrasting the extremes of 1980s culture (harassment, abuse, smoking) with those of 2020s culture (smartphones, social media, political correctness, cancel culture), while satirizing elements of both. It also has a unique musical element, with each episode featuring a humorous original song sung by the characters, usually relating to the cultural theme.

== Plot ==
Ichiro Ogawa is a junior high school teacher and baseball coach in Katsushika, Tokyo, known for his Spartan ideals and harsh words. He is a widower and lives with his rebellious sukeban daughter Junko.

One day in 1986, Ichirō boards a city bus, which turns out to be a time machine that takes him to Tokyo in 2024. Wandering into his favorite local cafe, Scandal, Ichiro meets Nagisa Inushima, a single mother who works at the EBS television station. He is eventually able to return to 1986 through a hole in the restroom wall of Scandal.

Meanwhile, feminist sociologist Sakae Sakisaka and her son Kiyoshi travel from 2024 to 1986. They move into the Ogawa home while Ichiro is away. A love triangle develops between Junko, Kiyoshi, and Junko's boyfriend Mutsumi Akitsu. Kiyoshi becomes obsessed with reaching out to a hikikomori student, Tsuyoshi Sako, who he eventually befriends and persuades to return to school.

The owner of Scandal patches the hole in the restroom wall, but Ichiro is able to return to 2024 after learning from Sakae that the time machine bus is the work of her ex-husband, and operates from the same stop on a fixed weekly schedule. He moves in with a young app developer named Masahiko, begins to develop a relationship with Nagisa, and gets a job at EBS as a counselor, where he applies his frank Showa-era perspective to the employees' problems.

Nagisa introduces Ichiro to her father Yuzuru, who recognizes Ichiro as his father-in-law. Ichiro learns that Nagisa is his granddaughter, that he and Junko both died in the 1995 Hanshin earthquake when Nagisa was still very young, and that the inventor of the time machine bus is Masakazu Inoue, one of his students and baseball players, who is the ex-husband of Sakae and father of Kiyoshi.

Ichiro returns to 1986, then brings Junko to 2024, where she meets Nagisa and Yuzuru, travels to Tokyo Skytree and Enoshima with Nagisa's hairdresser, and becomes more hopeful for the future. Junko returns to 1986, abandons her sukeban style, and vows to go to university.

The funding for the time machine project is cancelled, leaving Ichiro to believe that he is stuck in 2024 forever. Masakazu eventually discovers enough fuel for one more round trip to 1986. Nagisa is suspended from her job amid harassment allegations, Nagisa joins Ichiro to travel back to 1986. Sakae takes over Ichiro's job at EBS, and Ichiro persuades Kiyoshi to return to 2024 with Nagisa on the time machine's final run (returning all of the characters to their original timelines).

Walking down the street, Kiyoshi is spotted by Tsuyoshi, who has since become a wealthy video game developer and has been looking for Kiyoshi ever since junior high school. Kiyoshi and Sakae persuade Tsuyoshi to sponsor the time machine program. Nagisa and Masahiko begin a relationship, Ichiro having secretly rigged their dating apps so that they match with each other.

Back in 1986, Ichiro is deeply changed, no longer tolerating Showa-era harassment culture, and tries to inspire his students and baseball players by telling them about the brighter future ahead of them. Late one night, he hears knocking from the restroom at Scandal. Opening the door, he finds a large hole in the wall, and a much older Masakazu announcing that he has come from the year 2054, having found a time tunnel that can take them to any point in time. Ichiro climbs into the hole with Masakazu.

== Cast ==
- Sadawo Abe as Ichirō Ogawa
- Riisa Naka as Nagisa Inushima
- Hayato Isomura as Mutsumi Akitsu (1986) and Masahiko
  - Hikomaro as Mutsumi Akitsu (2024)
- Yuumi Kawai as Junko Ogawa, Ichirō's daughter
- Yō Yoshida as Sakae Sakisaka (2024)
  - Otone Maeda as Sakae Sakisaka (1986)
- Manato Sakamoto as Kiyoshi Sakisaka, Sakae's son
- Arata Furuta as Yuzuru Inushima (2024), Nagisa's father
  - Ryo Nishikido as Yuzuru Inushima (1990), Junko's husband
- Yoshihiko Hakamada as the master of a cafe (1986)
  - Baku Numata as the master of a cafe (2024)
- Hiroki Miyake as Masakazu Inoue (2024), Sakae's ex-husband & developer of time machine
  - Richi Nakata as Masakazu Inoue (1986), Yasumori & Ichiro's student
  - Takehiko Ono as Masakazu Inoue (2054), developer of time tunnel
- Ayumu Nakajima as Yasumori
- Koji Yamamoto as Kazuya Kurita
- Narushi Ikeda as Kentarō Emo
- Masaki Okada as Naoki
- Norito Yashima as himself
- Yu-ki Matsumura as himself, a popular actor in the 1980s. (Himself is in 2024)
- Kyoko Koizumi as herself, one of the top idols of the 1980s. (Herself is in 2024)

== Awards and nominations ==
Award	Category	Nominee(s)	Result	Ref.
17th Tokyo Drama Awards	Best Drama Series	Extremely Inappropriate!	Nominated	
17th Tokyo Drama Awards	Best Screenwriter	Kankurō Kudō	Won	
17th Tokyo Drama Awards	Best Director	Fuminori Kaneko	Won	
17th Tokyo Drama Awards	Best Theme Song	Nidone	Won	

== Cultural impact ==
The abbreviated title of the series, Futehodo, became a popular buzzword in Japan and was applied to corporate scandals in 2024. It was awarded the 2024 "U-can Shingo Ryukogo Taisho" (U-can Prize for New Words and Popular Words of the Year).

== See also ==
- Shōwa nostalgia
