= Nidone =

Single by Creepy Nuts

from the album Legion
- Language: Japanese; English
- A-side: "Bling-Bang-Bang-Born"
- Released: January 27, 2024
- Genre: Jersey club
- Length: 3:27
- Label: Onenation; Sony Music Associated
- Composer: DJ Matsunaga
- Lyricist: R-Shitei
- Producer: DJ Matsunaga

Creepy Nuts singles chronology
"Bling-Bang-Bang-Born" (2024)	"Nidone" (2024)	"Otonoke" (2024)

Music video
- "Nidone" on YouTube

"Nidone" (Japanese: 二度寝; lit. 'going back to sleep' or 'second sleep') is a song by Japanese hip-hop duo Creepy Nuts from their fourth studio album, Legion (2025). It was released as a single by Onenation and Sony Music Associated Records on January 27, 2024. The song was used as a theme song for television series Extremely Inappropriate! (2024).

== Background and release ==
On December 20, 2023, Creepy Nuts announced that they would be in charge of the theme song for 2024 television series Extremely Inappropriate!, titled "Nidone". Later, the duo also made cameo appearance on the final episode of the series. The song was available for digital music and streaming platforms on January 27, 2024, following the series' first episode ended. Subsequently, it was released alongside "Bling-Bang-Bang-Born" as a double A-side CD single on March 20. Daiki Kamoshita directed the music video for "Nidone" with the theme of "wind of the times and trends", premiered on March 29.

== Composition ==
A Jersey club track, "Nidone" was written for "dedication to the people of the Reiwa era who live in fear of the ever–changing 'righteousness' bound by compliance," according to the press release. The lyrics also takes inspiration in the Extremely Inappropriate! plot, contrasting between the Showa and Reiwa eras while making references to various aspects of the Japanese folklore like Urashima Tarō, Momotarō/Onigashima, and Hanasaka Jiisan.

== Accolades ==
Awards and nominations for "Nidone"
Ceremony	Year	Award	Result	Ref.
The Television Drama Academy Awards	2024	Drama Song Awards (First Quarter)	Won	
Tokyo Drama Awards	2024	Best Theme Song	Won	

== Track listing ==
- Digital download and streaming
1. "Nidone" (二度寝) – 3:27
2. "Nidone" (instrumental) – 3:27
- CD single (first production limited edition, regular edition)
1. "Nidone" – 3:29
2. "Bling-Bang-Bang-Born" – 2:50
3. "Nidone" (instrumental) – 3:29
4. "Bling-Bang-Bang-Born" (instrumental) – 2:50
- CD single (period production limited edition)
1. "Bling-Bang-Bang-Born" – 2:50
2. "Nidone" – 3:29
3. "Bling-Bang-Bang-Born" (instrumental) – 2:50
4. "Nidone" (instrumental) – 3:29
- Blu-ray (first production limited edition) — Creepy Nuts One Man Tour Ensemble Play at Saitama Super Arena
1. "2Way Nice Guy" – 3:48
2. "Joen Dan'yū-shō" – 3:47
3. "Teren Tekuda" – 3:28
4. "Spotlight" – 4:01
5. "Patto Saite Chitte Hai ni" – 3:18
6. "Santora" – 4:21
7. "Mimi Nashi Hōichi Style" – 3:40
8. "Dawn" – 3:33
9. "Daten" – 2:58
10. "Yofukashino Uta" – 4:04
11. "Inu mo Kuwanai" – 3:13
12. "Kami-sama" – 3:49
13. "Madman" – 1:36
14. "Yūjin A" – 3:13
15. "Front 9 Ban" – 3:54
16. "Losstime" – 3:49
17. "Katsute Tensai Datta Oretachi e" – 4:11
18. "Bad Orangez" – 3:53
19. "Great Journey" – 4:19
20. "Miyagebanashi" – 5:21
21. "Baka Majime" – 3:06
22. "Nobishiro" – 5:17
23. "Behind the Scenes of Creepy Nuts in Saitama Super Arena" – 29:33
- Blu-ray (period production limited edition)
1. "TV Anime Mashle: Magic and Muscles – The Divine Visionary Candidate Exam Non-Credit OP Video" – 1:29

== Personnel ==
- R-Shitei – vocals, lyrics
- DJ Matsunaga – composition, arrangement
- Masahito Komori – mixing
- Mike Bozzi – mastering

== Charts ==
=== Weekly charts ===
Weekly chart performance for "Nidone"
Chart (2024)	Peak position
Global Excl. US (Billboard)	160
Japan (Japan Hot 100)	9
Japan (Oricon)	6
Japan Combined Singles (Oricon)	1
Japan Anime Singles (Oricon)	4

=== Monthly charts ===
Monthly chart performance for "Nidone"
Chart (2024)	Position
Japan (Oricon)	18
Japan Anime Singles (Oricon)	5

=== Year-end charts ===
Year-end chart performance for "Nidone"
Chart (2024)	Position
Japan (Japan Hot 100)	59
Japan Combined Singles (Oricon)	1

== Certifications ==
Certifications for "Nidone"
Region	Certification	Certified units/sales
Streaming
Japan (RIAJ)	Platinum	100,000,000^{†}
^{†} Streaming-only figures based on certification alone.
