= Ensemble Play =

- Standard cover

Studio album by Creepy Nuts
- Released: September 7, 2022
- Length: 32:50
- Language: Japanese
- Label: Onenation; Sony Music Associated
- Producer: DJ Matsunaga

Creepy Nuts chronology
Case (2021)	Ensemble Play (2022)	Legion (2025)

Singles from Ensemble Play
- 1. "Patto Saite Chitte Hai ni" Released: March 9, 2022; 2. "Baka Majime" Released: March 20, 2022; 3. "2Way Nice Guy" Released: June 1, 2022; 4. "Daten" Released: July 8, 2022

Ensemble Play (Japanese: アンサンブル・プレイ, Hepburn: Ansanburu Purei) is the third studio album by Japanese hip-hop duo Creepy Nuts. It was released on September 7, 2022, by Onenation and Sony Music Associated Records. The album is follow-up to their 2021 studio album Case. Four singles preceded Ensemble Play: "Patto Saite Chitte Hai ni", "Baka Majime" (with Ayase and Lilas Ikuta), "2Way Nice Guy", and "Daten". In support of the album, the duo embarked on a concert tour of the same name in Japan from September to December 2022.

== Background and release ==
On July 5, 2022, Creepy Nuts announced their third studio album, titled Ensemble Play, alongside their concert tour of the same name throughout Japan from September to December 2022. It was scheduled to be released on September 7, the same day as the CD single of the album's track "Daten". Titled by DJ Matsunaga, Ensemble Play is primarily centered around fictional theme, rather than autobiography in previous records.

The physical version consists of four editions: standard, Radio, Live Blu-ray, and T-Shirt. The Radio edition features talk sessions about discussion around the album. The Live Blu-ray edition includes the Blu-ray of the performance of Case One Man Tour at Yokohama Arena. The T-Shirt edition comes with L-size T-shirt with the album's cover artwork printed on it.

== Promotion ==
Ensemble Play's lead single "Patto Saite Chitte Hai ni" was released on March 9, 2022, served as the 94th Japanese High School Baseball Invitational Tournament's official theme song. Less than a month later, on March 20, Creepy Nuts released "Baka Majime", a collaboration with Ayase and Lilas Ikuta, for the All Night Nippon 55th-anniversary stage drama Ano Yoru o Oboe Teru.

The theme for the live-action film adaptation of manga series The Way of the Househusband, "2Way Nice Guy", was released as the album's third single on June 1. "Daten" was available digitally on July 8, before issued as CD single on September 7, the same day as its parent album. The song was used as the opening theme for the anime series Call of the Night.

In addition to singles, Ensemble Play includes the full-length version of "Losstime", an insert song for the anime series Call of the Night; and "Dawn", a jingle for energy drink Zone commercial.

== Track listing ==
All lyrics are written by R-Shitei, except "Intro", "Madman" and "Outro"; all music is composed by DJ Matsunaga.

Ensemble Play track listing
No.	Title	Lyrics	Music	Length
1.	"Intro"			0:47
2.	"2Way Nice Guy"			3:44
3.	"Patto Saite Chitte Hai ni" (パッと咲いて散って灰に)			2:42
4.	"Dawn"			3:03
5.	"Daten" (堕天)			2:52
6.	"Madman"			1:40
7.	"Yūjin A" (友人A)			3:02
8.	"Front Desk No. 9" (フロント9番)			3:55
9.	"Losstime" (ロスタイム)			3:39
10.	"Baka Majime" (ばかまじめ)	R-Shitei; Ayase	DJ Matsunaga; Ayase	2:52
11.	"Outro"			0:34
12.	"Nobishiro" (のびしろ; from The First Take)			3:54
Total length:				32:50

Ensemble Play – Radio edition
No.	Title	Length
1.	"Intro"	0:47
2.	"OP Talk" (OPトーク)	7:43
3.	"2Way Nice Guy"	3:44
4.	"Ensemble Play to wa" (アンサンブル・プレイとは)	3:22
5.	"Patto Saite Chitte Hai ni"	2:42
6.	"Dawn"	3:03
7.	"Daten"	2:52
8.	"Madman Senshuken" (Madman選手権)	6:18
9.	"Madman"	1:40
10.	"2015 Nentte Nani Yattetandakke?" (2015年って何やってたんだっけ?)	8:33
11.	"Yūjin A"	3:02
12.	"Front Desk No. 9"	3:52
13.	"Futari no Henka" (2人の変化)	3:32
14.	"Losstime"	3:39
15.	"Baka Majime"	2:52
16.	"ED Talk" (EDトーク)	4:07
17.	"Outro"	0:34
18.	"Nobishiro ga Sugoi zo! Jimoto no Osusume Spot 2022" (のびしろがすごいぞ!地元のおススメスポット2022)	4:07
19.	"Nobishiro" (from The First Take)	3:54
Total length:		73:46

Ensemble Play – Live Blu-ray edition (Creepy Nuts One Man Tour "Case" at Yokohama Arena)
No.	Title	Length
1.	"DJ Routine"	4:30
2.	"Lazy Boy"	3:09
3.	"Bareru!" (バレる!)	3:24
4.	"Yofukashi no Uta" (よふかしのうた)	4:25
5.	"Kami-sama" (紙様)	3:18
6.	"Joen Dan'yū-shō" (助演男優賞)	2:57
7.	"Kaoyaku" (顔役)	3:09
8.	"Miminashi Hō'ichi Style" (耳なし芳一Style)	3:17
9.	"Ore yori Erai Yatsu" (俺より偉い奴)	3:05
10.	"Furai" (風来)	3:02
11.	"Otona" (オトナ)	3:25
12.	"Nobishiro"	4:22
13.	"Trench Coat Mafia" (トレンチコートマフィア)	3:09
14.	"Digital Tattoo" (デジタルタトゥー)	2:46
15.	"15 Sai" (15才)	3:47
16.	"Santora" (サントラ)	4:15
17.	"Bad Orangez"	3:52
18.	"Katsute Tensai Datta Oretachi e" (かつて天才だった俺たちへ)	4:25
19.	"Who Am I"	4:11
20.	"Tukaenai Yatsura" (使えない奴ら)	5:22
21.	"Miyagebanashi" (土産話)	5:23
22.	"Behind the Scene of Creepy Nuts in Yokohama Arena"	28:10
Total length:		168:50

== Personnel ==
Creepy Nuts

- R-Shitei – vocals (2–5, 7–10, 12)
- DJ Matsunaga – arrangement, turntable, sampler, programming

Additional contributors

- Daisuke Kawaguchi – arrangement (2, 5)
- Ikuta Lilas – vocals (10)
- Ayase – arrangement (10)

== Charts ==
=== Weekly charts ===
Weekly chart performance for Ensemble Play
Chart (2022)	Peak position
Japanese Albums (Oricon)	3
Japanese Combined Albums (Oricon)	3
Japanese Dance & Soul Albums (Oricon)	1
Japanese Hot Albums (Billboard Japan)	3

=== Monthly charts ===
Monthly chart performance for Ensemble Play
Chart (2022)	Position
Japanese Albums (Oricon)	10

== Release history ==
Release dates and formats for Ensemble Play
Region	Date	Format	Version	Label	Ref.
Various	September 7, 2022	Digital download; streaming	Standard	Onenation; Sony Music Associated	
Japan	September 7, 2022	CD; CD+Blu-ray	Standard; Radio; Blu-ray Live; T-Shirt	Onenation; Sony Music Associated	
