= Case (Creepy Nuts album) =

Studio album by Creepy Nuts
- Released: September 1, 2021
- Length: 37:10
- Language: Japanese
- Label: Onenation; Sony Music Associated
- Producer: DJ Matsunaga

Creepy Nuts chronology
Katsute Tensai Datta Oretachi e (2020)	Case (2021)	Ensemble Play (2022)

Singles from Case
- 1. "Bareru!" Released: March 3, 2021; 2. "Kaoyaku" Released: March 17, 2021; 3. "Who am I" Released: April 7, 2021; 4. "Lazy Boy" Released: June 23, 2021; 5. "Nobishiro" Released: August 25, 2021

Case is the second studio album by Japanese hip-hop duo Creepy Nuts. It was released on September 1, 2021, through Onenation and Sony Music Associated Records, over 3 years after the first studio album Creep Show. The album was preceded by five singles, including the RIAJ double-platinum certified single "Nobishiro". In support of Case, the duo embarked on the concert tour of the same name throughout Japan from September to November 2021.

== Background ==
This album as said, contains all kinds of feelings that R-Shitei have felt since forming Creepy Nuts. It is their first studio album in over 3 and a half years.

== Release and promotion ==
The album and its content was announced on July 29, 2021, set to release on September 1, including 4 versions, the standard, Radio edition, Blu-ray disc including the duo's first Nippon Budokan concert, and a T-shirt edition. The first limited editions include a serial code to apply for the album's promotional tour

== Track listing ==
All lyrics are written by R-Shitei; all music is composed by DJ Matsunaga.

Case track listing
No.	Title	Length
1.	"Lazy Boy"	3:01
2.	"Bareru!" (バレる！)	3:14
3.	"Kaoyaku" (顔役)	3:08
4.	"Oreyori Eraiyatsu" (俺より偉い奴)	3:07
5.	"Furai" (風来)	2:48
6.	"Nobishiro" (のびしろ)	3:56
7.	"Digital Tattoo" (デジタルタトゥー)	2:51
8.	"15sai" (15才)	3:18
9.	"Bad Orangez"	3:32
10.	"Who am I"	3:50
11.	"Miyagebanashi" (土産話)	4:25
Total length:		37:10

Case - Radio edition
No.	Title	Length
1.	"OP Theme"
2.	"Lazy Boy"	3:01
3.	"Flex Showdown" (フレックス対決)
4.	"Bareru!" (バレる！)	3:14
5.	"Jimoto no Ososusume 2021" (地元おすすめスポット2021)
6.	"Kaoyaku" (顔役)	3:08
7.	"Oreyori Eraiyatsu" (俺より偉い奴)	3:07
8.	"Furai" (風来)	2:48
9.	"Title (tentatve)" (タイトル(仮))
10.	"Nobishiro" (のびしろ)	3:56
11.	"Digital Tattoo" (デジタルタトゥー)	2:51
12.	"15sai no Hanashi" (15才の話)
13.	"15sai" (15才)	3:18
14.	"Saikou Good Fruit" (最強Goodフルーツ)
15.	"Bad Orangez"	3:32
16.	"Story of "Who am I""
17.	"Who am I"	3:50
18.	"Miyagebanashi no Hanashi" (土産話の話)
19.	"Miyagebanashi" (土産話)	4:25
20.	"ED Theme" (EDトーク)
Total length:		37:10

Case – Live Blu-ray edition (Creepy Nuts One Man Live "Katsute Tensaidatta Oretachie" Nippon Budokan Day 2)
No.	Title	Length
1.	"Spotlight" (スポットライト)
2.	"Nariwai" (生業)
3.	"Miminashi Houichi Style" (耳無し芳一Style)
4.	"Hellraiser" (ヘルレイザー)
5.	"Joendaiyusho" (助演男優賞)
6.	"Yofukashi no Uta" (よふかしのうた)
7.	"Kamisama" (紙様)
8.	"Abazure" (阿婆擦れ)
9.	"Otona" (オトナ)
10.	"Nichiyobi Yori no Shisha" (日曜日よりの使者)
11.	"Santora" (サントラ)
12.	"Trench Coat Mafia" (トレンチコートマフィア)
13.	"Tsukenai Yatsura" (使えない奴ら)
14.	"Asayake" (朝焼け)
15.	"Dr. Frakenstein" (Dr.フランケンシュタイン)
16.	"Katsute Tensaidatta Oretachie" (かつて天才だった俺たちへ)
17.	"Bad Orangez"
18.	"Great Journey" (グレートジャーニー)
19.	"Documentary of Creepy Nuts in Nippon Budokan"

== Personnel ==
Creepy Nuts

- R-Shitei – vocals, lyricist
- DJ Matsunaga – arrangement, sampling

Additional contributors

- Daisuke Kawaguchi – arrangement (2, 10), keyboard (2, 10)
- Kazuki Isogai – arrangement (5), guitar (1–2, 5–6, 8–11)
- Kimura Sosei – drums (2, 6, 10)
- Maeda Ippei – bass (5–6)
- Tomohiko Okanda – bass (10)
- Sudo Yuu – bass, mixing (2)
- D.O.I – mixing (1–11)
- Hidekazu Sakai – mastering
- Hiroya Brian Nakano – video director (Blu-ray)

== Charts ==
Chart performance for Case
Chart (2025)	Peak position
Japanese Combined Albums (Oricon)	3
Japanese Hot Albums (Billboard Japan)	3

== Release history ==
Release dates and formats for Case
Region	Date	Format	Version	Label	Ref.
Japan	September 1, 2021	CD; CD+Blu-ray	Live Blu-ray; Radio; standard; "T-shirt"	Onenation; Sony Music Associated	
Various	September 1, 2021	CD; CD+Blu-ray	Live Blu-ray; Radio; standard; "T-shirt"	Onenation; Sony Music Associated	
