= Baka Majime =

Single by Creepy Nuts, Ayase and Lilas Ikuta

from the album Ensemble Play
- Language: Japanese
- Released: March 20, 2022
- Genre: J-pop
- Length: 2:52
- Label: Onenation; Sony Music Associated
- Composers: DJ Matsunaga; Ayase
- Lyricists: R-Shitei; Ayase
- Producers: DJ Matsunaga; Ayase

Creepy Nuts singles chronology
"Patto Saite Chitte Hai ni" (2022)	"Baka Majime" (2022)	"2Way Nice Guy" (2022)

Ayase singles chronology
"Yoru Naderu Menō" / "Yūrei Tōkyō" (2022)	"Baka Majime" (2022)	"Howa" / "Cinema" (2022)

Lilas Ikuta singles chronology
"Sparkle" (2022)	"Baka Majime" (2022)	"Lens" (2022)

Music video
- "Baka Majime" on YouTube

"Baka Majime" (Japanese: ばかまじめ; lit. 'Baka seriously') is a song by Japanese hip-hop duo Creepy Nuts, record producer and musician Ayase, and singer-songwriter Lilas Ikuta, taken from the former's third studio album Ensemble Play (2022). It was released as a single on March 20, 2022, through Onenation and Sony Music Associated Records. The song was featured on the All Night Nippon 55th-anniversary stage drama Ano Yoru o Oboe Teru.

== Background and composition ==
On December 21, 2021, it was announced that hip-hop duo Creepy Nuts, radio hosts of All Night Nippon 0, and duo Yoasobi (Ayase and Lilas Ikuta), radio hosts of All Night Nippon X, would collaborate to perform a theme for All Night Nippon 55th-anniversary stage drama Ano Yoru o Oboe Teru (あの夜を覚えてる; lit. "Remember that night"), starring Yudai Chiba, and Hikaru Takahashi. It was broadcast on March 20 and 27, 2022. As the song is not based on a fictional story, Yoasobi individually performed as Ayase and Ikuta.

On March 15, 2022, they announced the title "Baka Majime", and its cover artwork, set to be released on March 20, alongside the accompanying music video. The song aired for the first time on both two radio show on the same day. Written by two members of Creepy Nuts: DJ Matsunaga and R-Shitei, and Ayase, "Baka Majime" is described as a "human hymn", that praises seriously baka people who do their best.

== Charts ==
Chart performance for "Baka Majime"
Chart (2022)	Peak position
Japan Combined Singles (Oricon)	50
Japan Hot 100 (Billboard)	38

== Certifications ==
Certifications for "Baka Majime"
Region	Certification	Certified units/sales
Streaming
Japan (RIAJ)	Platinum	100,000,000^{†}
^{†} Streaming-only figures based on certification alone.

== Release history ==
Release dates and formats for "Baka Majime"
Region	Date	Format	Label	Ref.
Various	March 20, 2022	Digital download; streaming	Onenation; Sony Music Associated	
