= Creepy Nuts =

Japanese hip-hop duo

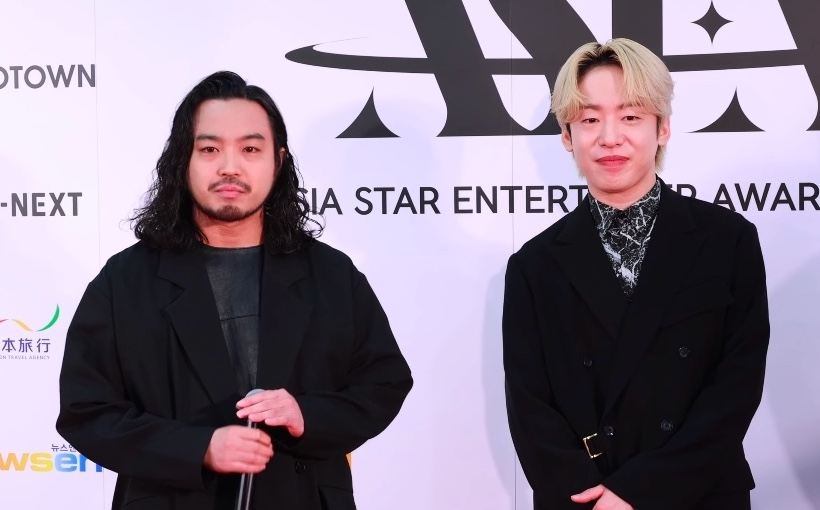
- Creepy Nuts in April 2024; R-Shitei and DJ Matsunaga

Background information
- Origin: Japan
- Genres: Hip-hop; electro-hop
- Years active: 2013–present
- Labels: Tricker; Creepers; Onenation; Sony Music Associated; Arista
- Members: DJ Matsunaga; R-Shitei
- Website: Official website

Creepy Nuts are a Japanese hip-hop duo consisting of DJ Matsunaga and R-Shitei, currently signed to Onenation and Sony Music Associated Records. The duo rose to international prominence in 2024 with their biggest hit single to date "Bling-Bang-Bang-Born", an opening theme for the second season of the anime series Mashle: Magic and Muscles, as their most successful song to date. In Japan, the song was the best-performing song in 2024, topping the Oricon Combined Singles Chart and Billboard Japan Hot 100. It also peaked at number eight on the Billboard Global 200. The duo gained even more worldwide recognition with the release of their second biggest hit single "Otonoke", which was included as the opening theme for the hit anime series Dandadan.

== History ==
=== 2013–2017: Formation and independent works ===
The duo's name Creepy Nuts has no deep meaning because they never thought that they would become famous. Their first commercial song together, "Shirafu de Suikyō," was included on the compilation album Popgroup Presents Kaikoo Planet III, which was released on August 8, 2013. In July 2014, the duo participated in Fuji Rock Festival for the first time. In March 2015, Creepy Nuts signed a management contract with Steel Street, and released their debut single "Setsuna" on August 26. The duo released their first two extended plays through Tricker: Tarinai Futari on January 20, 2016, and Joen Dan'yū-shō on February 1, 2017. Both releases were accompanied by concert tours in Japan: Tarinai Jungyō 2016 Haru Basho (2016) and Itsuka no Extra, Live on Stage (2017).

=== 2017–2023: Major-label debut ===
On April 9, 2017, Creepy Nuts announced their major-label debut under Sony Music Entertainment Japan. Afterwards, the duo established their own label Creepers and released their major-label debut single Kōkō Debut, Daigaku Debut, Zenbu Shippaishita Kedo Major Debut, consisting of double A-side "Major Debut Shinan" and "Daga Sore de Ii". It was initially scheduled to be released on August 2, but was postponed to November 8, due to various circumstances. On April 11, 2018, Creepy Nuts released their debut studio album Creep Show, which was accompanied by the concert tour Creep Show 2018 from June to November. In the same year, they began hosting the radio show All Night Nippon, a role they held until 2023. They also released a compilation album, Indies Complete, on July 25, featuring songs recorded during their time as an independent artist.

The duo released their next major-label EP, Yofukashi no Uta, on August 7, 2019, and held a concert tour of the same name from September to December. Creepy Nuts released their fourth EP Katsute Tensai Datta Oretachi e on August 26, 2020, their first record under Onenation. The EP features a guest appearance by Masaki Suda on the track "Santora" and "Nichiyōbi yori no Shisha". They held a one-man live of the same name at Nippon Budokan on November 11–12, 2020, announced the Enchosen Semi One-Man Live, a one-man tour and launched their official fan club "Club Creepy Nuts", in the first quarter on 2021

Creepy Nuts' second studio album Case was released on September 1, 2021. The album's single "Nobishiro" became their first platinum-certified track for streaming by Recording Industry Association of Japan (RIAJ), surpassing 100 million on-demand streams. Case was supported with a tour of the same name between September and November. The duo also held a two-man live and two-man tour titled "Nariwai", featuring various guests, through November 2023. Creepy Nuts released their third studio album Ensemble Play on September 7, 2022. It was preceded by five singles, including "Baka Majime", a collaboration with Ayase and Lilas Ikuta for All Night Nippon's 55th-anniversary stage drama Ano Yoru o Oboeteru; and "Daten", the opening theme for the anime series Call of the Night. The duo embarked on a tour of the same name from September to December 2022, and held their major debut's fifth anniversary concert at Nippon Budokan on November 5. They also dropped most of their media appearances starting from 2023, except for radio and music shows' guest performances, to concentrate on music.

=== 2024–present: Global recognition with "Bling-Bang-Bang-Born" ===
Creepy Nuts was in charge of the opening theme "Bling-Bang-Bang-Born" for the second season of the anime television series Mashle: Magic and Muscles, subtitled The Divine Visionary Candidate Exam, released on January 7, 2024. It became their breakthrough both in Japan and overseas thanks to the "BBBB Dance" Internet challenge. The song topped the Oricon Combined Singles Chart for four non-consecutive weeks, and the Billboard Japan Hot 100 for 19 non-consecutive weeks, the second longest-running number one in history after Yoasobi's "Idol" (22 weeks), Internationally, the song peaked at number eight on the Billboard Global 200. "Bling-Bang-Bang-Born" was the best performing songs in Japan in 2024, and later received diamond certification, surpassing 500 million streams, from the RIAJ in February 2025. The song also was certified Gold by the Recording Industry Association of America (RIAA) for 500,000 sold copies in the United States.

In the same month, Creepy Nuts released "Nidone", the theme song for the 2024 television series Extremely Inappropriate!. The duo made a cameo appearance in the final episode. From March to June, the duo embarked on their 2024 one man tour. In the second half of 2024, they performed the song "Otonoke", which was the opening theme for the Japanese anime series Dandadan. It became the duo's second number one on the Billboard Japan Hot 100, and later also received Gold certification by RIAA, making them the first Japanese artist with 2 RIAA-certified song. The duo concluded the year by performing "Bling-Bang-Bang-Born" at the 66th Japan Record Awards on December 30, where they won an Excellence Award, as well as the 75th NHK Kōhaku Uta Gassen the next day.

The theme for the live-action film adaptation of manga series Under Ninja, the duo's "Doppelgänger", was released on January 24, 2025. It preceded the duo's fourth studio album Legion, released digitally on February 5, and physically on March 12. The duo's first concert at Tokyo Dome took place on February 11, and was released exclusively through Amazon Prime Video on April 28. In support of Legion, the duo ran their Legion One Man Tour from May to September, an Asia tour between October and November, and a North America tour in April 2026, including their first appearance at Coachella. The duo songs "Mirage" and "Nemure" were the opening and ending theme, respectively, for the second season of the anime series Call of the Night. The song "Get Higher" also appeared as the credits theme in the video game Sonic Racing: CrossWorlds.

The song "Fright" was the theme song for the Tuesday TBS drama It's Time for Sushi?, released on April 10, 2026.

== Members ==
- DJ Matsunaga (DJ松永) – DJ, composer
- R-Shitei (R-指定) – rapper, lyricist

== Discography ==
=== Studio albums ===
List of studio albums, with selected details, chart positions and sales
Title	Details	Peak positions				Sales
Title	Details	JPN	JPN Cmb.	JPN Hot	US World	Sales
Creep Show	Released: April 11, 2018; Label: Creepers, Sony Japan; Formats: CD, DL, streaming	16	—	11	—	JPN: 6,568
Case	Released: September 1, 2021; Label: Onenation, Sony Music Associated; Formats: CD, CD+BD, DL, streaming	3	4	3	—	JPN: 26,535
Ensemble Play	Released: September 7, 2022; Label: Onenation, Sony Music Associated; Formats: CD, CD+BD, DL, streaming	3	3	3	—	JPN: 21,688
Legion	Released: February 5, 2025; Label: Onenation, Sony Music Associated; Formats: CD, CD+BD, DL, streaming	7	7	3	15	JPN: 24,184
"—" denotes releases that did not chart or were not released in that region.

=== Compilation albums ===
List of compilation albums, with selected details and chart positions
Title	Details	Peaks
Title	Details	JPN
Indies Complete	Release: July 25, 2018; Label: Tricker; Formats: CD, DL, streaming	148

=== Extended plays ===
List of extended plays, (Note: Classified as "mini-album".) with selected details, chart positions and sales
Title	Details	Peak positions			Sales
Title	Details	JPN	JPN Cmb.	JPN Hot	Sales
Tarinai Futari	Release: January 20, 2016; Label: Tricker; Formats: CD, DL, streaming	43	—	16	
Joen Dan'yū-shō	Release: February 1, 2017; Label: Tricker; Formats: CD, DL, streaming	16	—	9	
Yofukashi no Uta	Release: August 7, 2019; Label: Creepers, Sony Music Associated; Formats: CD, CD+DVD, DL, streaming	12	12	11	JPN: 9,923
Katsute Tensai Datta Oretachi e	Release: August 26, 2020; Label: Onenation, Sony Music Associated; Formats: CD, CD+DVD, DL, streaming	5	2	2	JPN: 20,515
"—" denotes releases that did not chart or were not released in that region.

=== Singles ===
==== As lead artist ====
List of singles as lead artist, with selected chart positions, showing year released, certifications and album name
Title	Year	Peak chart positions									Certifications	Album
Title	Year	JPN	JPN Cmb.	JPN Hot	FRA	KOR	NZ Hot	US Bub.	US World	WW	Certifications	Album
"Setsuna"	2015	—	—	—	—	—	—	—	—	—		Indies Complete
"Major Debut Shinan" (Note: "Major Debut Shinan" and "Daga Sore de Ii" were released as a CD single under the title Kōkō Debut, Daigaku Debut, Zenbu Shippaishita Kedo Major Debut.)	2017	23	—	54	—	—	—	—	—	—		Non-album single
"Daga Sore de Ii"	2017	23	—	—	—	—	—	—	—	—		Creep Show
"Kaiko"	2018	—	—	—	—	—	—	—	—	—		Creep Show
"Spotlight"	2018	—	—	—	—	—	—	—	—	—		Creep Show
"Abazure"	2018	—	—	—	—	—	—	—	—	—		Yofukashi no Uta
"Yofukashi no Uta"	2018	—	—	—	—	—	—	—	—	—	RIAJ: Platinum (st.)	Yofukashi no Uta
"Ita no Ue no Mamono"	2018	—	—	—	—	—	—	—	—	—		Yofukashi no Uta
"Otona"	2020	—	—	—	—	—	—	—	—	—		Katsute Tensai Datta Oretachi e
"Santora" (with Masaki Suda)	2020	—	29	26	—	—	—	—	—	—	RIAJ: Gold (st.)	Katsute Tensai Datta Oretachi e
"Bareru!"	2021	—	—	63	—	—	—	—	—	—		Case
"Kaoyaku"	2021	—	—	—	—	—	—	—	—	—		Case
"Who Am I"	2021	—	—	—	—	—	—	—	—	—		Case
"Lazy Boy"	2021	—	—	—	—	—	—	—	—	—		Case
"Nobishiro"	2021	—	—	58	—	—	—	—	—	—	RIAJ: 2× Platinum (st.)	Case
"Patto Saite Chitte Hai ni"	2022	—	—	92	—	—	—	—	—	—		Ensemble Play
"Baka Majime" (with Ayase and Lilas Ikuta)	2022	—	50	38	—	—	—	—	—	—	RIAJ: Platinum (st.)	Ensemble Play
"2Way Nice Guy"	2022	—	—	58	—	—	—	—	—	—		Ensemble Play
"Daten"	2022	9	28	35	—	—	—	—	—	—	RIAJ: Platinum (st.)	Ensemble Play
"Biriken"	2023	—	—	—	—	—	—	—	—	—		Legion
"Bling-Bang-Bang-Born"	2024	6	1	1	173	188	12	—	3	8	RIAJ: Platinum (dig.); Diamond (st.); RIAA: Gold; SNEP: Gold	Legion
"Nidone"	2024	6	1	9	—	—	—	—	—	— (Note: "Nidone" did not enter the Billboard Global 200, but peaked at number 160 on the Global Excl. US.)	RIAJ: Platinum (st.)	Legion
"Otonoke"	2024	19	2	1	—	—	4	22	1	37	RIAJ: Gold (dig.); 2× Platinum (st.); RIAA: Gold	Legion
"Doppelgänger"	2025	—	19	15	—	—	—	—	—	—	RIAJ: Gold (st.)	Legion
"Mirage"	2025	17	—	54	—	—	—	—	7	—		TBA
"Nemure"	2025	17	—	—	—	—	—	—	—	—		TBA
"Fright"	2026	—	—	—	—	—	—	—	—	—		TBA
"Running Wheel"	2026	—	—	—	—	—	—	—	—	—		TBA
"Tom and Jerry and Haters and Me"	2026	—	—	—	—	—	—	—	—	—		TBA
"—" denotes releases that did not chart or were not released in that region.

==== As featured artist ====
List of singles as featured artist, with selected chart positions, showing year released and album name
Title	Year	Peaks	Album
Title	Year	JPN	Album
"SOS!" (Androp featuring Creepy Nuts)	2017	54	Cocoon

=== Other charted songs ===
List of other charted songs, with selected chart positions, showing year released, certifications and album name
Title	Year	Peaks		Certifications	Album
Title	Year	JPN Dig.	JPN Hot	Certifications	Album
"Gōhōteki Tobi Kata no Susume"	2016	—	—	RIAJ: Platinum (st.)	Tarinai Futari
"Joen Dan'yū-shō"	2017	—	—	RIAJ: Gold (st.)	Joen Dan'yū-shō
"Katsute Tensai Datta Oretachi e"	2020	43	63	RIAJ: Platinum (st.)	Katsute Tensai Datta Oretachi e
"—" denotes releases that did not chart or were not released in that region.

=== Guest appearances ===
List of non-single guest appearances, with other performing artists, showing year released and album name
Title	Year	Other artist(s)	Album
"Sirafu de Suikyō"	2013	—N/a	Popgroup Presents Kaikoo Planet III
"Rewrite"	2017	—N/a	AKG Tribute
"Poker Face"	2019	—N/a	Boys Meet Harmony
"Chotto Dake Baka"	2019	Gaki Ranger	Tinkerbell: Neverland no Yōsei Tachi
"Movin'"	2019	Yoru no Honki Dance	Fetish
"Rōman Hikō"	2019	Sanabagun	Ballads
"Ni-Zero Ni-Zero"	2020	Chiaki Mayumura	Nippon Genki Onna Kashu
"Illusion" (Creepy Nuts remix)	2024	Dua Lipa	Radical Optimism (Japan Tour edition)

=== Video albums ===
List of video albums, with selected details and chart positions
Title	Details	Peaks	
Title	Details	JPN DVD	JPN BD
Creepy Nuts no All Night Nippon 0 "The Live 2020": Kaihen Toppa Ikuze Hip Hopper!	Released: August 26, 2020; Label: Onenation, Sony Music Associated; Formats: DVD	9	—
Creepy Nuts no All Night Nippon "The Live 2022": Orera no Roots wa Aku made Radio da to wa It-te-O-ki-tai ze!	Released: March 1, 2023; Label: Onenation, Sony Music Associated; Formats: DVD, BD	15	7
Creepy Nuts Major Debut 5th Anniversary Live "2017–2022" in Nippon Budokan	Released: July 19, 2023; Label: Onenation, Sony Music Associated; Formats: BD	—	14
"—" denotes releases that did not chart or were not released in that region.

== Filmography ==
=== Film ===
Title	Year	Role	Note	Ref.
Mutafukaz	2017	Gangs	Japanese dub voice	

=== Television ===
Title	Year	Role	Note	Ref.
Jōnetsu Tairiku	2020	Themselves	Documentary	

=== Radio shows ===
Title	Year	Role	Ref.
Creepy Nuts' All Night Nippon 0	2018–2022	Host	
Creepy Nuts' All Night Nippon	2022–2023	Host	

== Tours ==
- Tarinai Jungyō 2016 Haru Basho (2016)
- Itsuka no Extra, Live on Stage (2017)
- Kōkō Debut, Daigaku Debut, Zenbu Shippaishita Kedo Major Debut One Man Tour (2017)
- Kōkō Debut, Daigaku Debut, Zenbu Shippaishita Kedo "Tsuini" Major Debut Tour (2018)
- Creep Show 2018 One Man Tour (2018)
- Nariwai Two Man Tour (2019)
- Yofukashi no Uta One Man Tour (2019)
- Katsute Tensai Datta Oretachi e One Man Tour (2021)
- Case One Man Tour (2021)
- Nariwai Two Man Live (2021–2022)
- Nariwai Two Man Tour (2022)
- Club Creepy Nuts Premium Live (2022)
- Ensemble Play One Man Tour (2022)
- Nariwai Two Man Tour 2023 (2023)
- Creepy Nuts One Man Tour 2024 (2024)
- Legion One Man Tour (2025)
- Creepy Nuts Asia Tour 2025 (2025)
- Creepy Nuts North America Tour 2026 (2026)

== Awards and nominations ==
Name of the award ceremony, year presented, category, nominee of the award, and the result of the nomination
Award ceremony	Year	Category	Nominee / work	Result	Ref.
Abema Anime Trend Awards	2024	Opening Animation Award	"Otonoke"	Won	
AMD Awards	2025	Excellence Award	"Bling-Bang-Bang-Born"	Won	
Anime Grand Prix	2024	Best Theme Song	"Bling-Bang-Bang-Born"	7th place	
Anime Grand Prix	2025	Best Theme Song	"Otonoke"	2nd place	
Anime Trending Awards	2023	Opening Theme Song of the Year	"Daten"	4th place	
Anime Trending Awards	2023	Ending Theme Song of the Year	"Yofukashi no Uta"	Won	
Anime Trending Awards	2025	Opening Theme Song of the Year	"Bling-Bang-Bang-Born"	Nominated	
Anime Trending Awards	2025	Opening Theme Song of the Year	"Otonoke"	Won	
Anime Trending Awards	2026	Opening Theme Song of the Year	"Mirage"	Won	
Asia Star Entertainer Awards	2024	Hot Trend	Creepy Nuts	Won	
CD Shop Awards	2021	Grand Prize (Red)	Katsute Tensai Datta Oretachi e	Nominated	
CD Shop Awards	2021	Finalist Award (Red)	Katsute Tensai Datta Oretachi e	Won	
CD Shop Awards	2022	Grand Prize (Red)	Case	Nominated	
CD Shop Awards	2022	Finalist Award (Red)	Case	Won	
CD Shop Awards	2022	Comment Award	Case	Won	
CD Shop Awards	2023	Grand Prize (Red)	Ensemble Play	Nominated	
CD Shop Awards	2023	Finalist Award (Red)	Ensemble Play	Won	
CD Shop Awards	2026	Grand Prize (Red)	Legion	Nominated	
CD Shop Awards	2026	Finalist Award (Red)	Legion	Won	
Crunchyroll Anime Awards	2025	Best Anime Song	"Bling-Bang-Bang-Born"	Nominated	
Crunchyroll Anime Awards	2025	Best Anime Song	"Otonoke"	Won	
Crunchyroll Anime Awards	2025	Best Opening Sequence	"Otonoke"	Won	
Crunchyroll Anime Awards	2025	Best Opening Sequence	"Bling-Bang-Bang-Born"	Nominated	
Crunchyroll Anime Awards	2026	Best Opening Sequence	"Mirage"	Nominated	
Japan Record Awards	2024	Grand Prix	"Bling-Bang-Bang-Born"	Nominated	
Japan Record Awards	2024	Excellent Awards	"Bling-Bang-Bang-Born"	Won	
Japan Gold Disc Award	2024	Song of the Year by Download (Japan)	"Bling-Bang-Bang-Born"	Won	
Japan Gold Disc Award	2024	Best 3 Songs by Download	"Bling-Bang-Bang-Born"	Won	
Japan Gold Disc Award	2024	Song of the Year by Streaming (Japan)	"Bling-Bang-Bang-Born"	Won	
Japan Gold Disc Award	2024	Best 5 Songs by Streaming	"Bling-Bang-Bang-Born"	Won	
JASRAC Awards	2025	Silver Award	"Bling-Bang-Bang-Born"	Won	
JASRAC Awards	2026	Bronze Prize	"Bling-Bang-Bang-Born"	Won	
MTV Video Music Awards Japan	2020	Best Hip-Hop Video	"Katsute Tensai Datta Oretachi e"	Won	
MTV Video Music Awards Japan	2025	Song of The Year	"Bling-Bang-Bang-Born"	Won	
Music Awards Japan	2025	Artist of the Year	Creepy Nuts	Nominated	
Music Awards Japan	2025	Best Japanese Hip Hop/Rap Artist	Creepy Nuts	Won	
Music Awards Japan	2025	Best Japanese Dance Pop Artist	Creepy Nuts	Nominated	
Music Awards Japan	2025	Song of the Year	"Bling-Bang-Bang-Born"	Won	
Music Awards Japan	2025	Best Japanese Song	"Bling-Bang-Bang-Born"	Won	
Music Awards Japan	2025	Best Japanese Hip Hop/Rap Song	"Bling-Bang-Bang-Born"	Won	
Music Awards Japan	2025	Best Japanese Dance Pop Song	"Bling-Bang-Bang-Born"	Won	
Music Awards Japan	2025	Best Anime Song	"Bling-Bang-Bang-Born"	Nominated	
Music Awards Japan	2025	Best Music Video	"Bling-Bang-Bang-Born"	Nominated	
Music Awards Japan	2025	Best Viral Song	"Bling-Bang-Bang-Born"	Won	
Music Awards Japan	2025	Top Japanese Song in Asia	"Bling-Bang-Bang-Born"	Nominated	
Music Awards Japan	2025	Top Japanese Song in Europe	"Bling-Bang-Bang-Born"	Won	
Music Awards Japan	2025	Top Japanese Song in North America	"Bling-Bang-Bang-Born"	Won	
Music Awards Japan	2025	Top Japanese Song in Latin America	"Bling-Bang-Bang-Born"	Won	
Music Awards Japan	2025	Best of Listeners' Choice: Japanese Song	"Bling-Bang-Bang-Born"	Nominated	
Music Awards Japan	2025	Karaoke of the Year: J-Pop	"Bling-Bang-Bang-Born"	Nominated	
Music Awards Japan	2026	Best Japanese Hip Hop/Rap Song	"Doppelgänger"	Won	
Music Awards Japan	2026	Best Japanese Hip Hop/Rap Artist	Creepy Nuts	Won	
Music Awards Japan	2026	Top Japanese Song in Europe	"Otonoke"	Nominated	
Music Awards Japan	2026	Top Japanese Song in North America	"Otonoke"	Nominated	
Music Awards Japan	2026	Top Japanese Song in Latin America	"Otonoke"	Nominated	
Reiwa Anisong Awards	2025	Best Work Award	"Otonoke"	Nominated	
Reiwa Anisong Awards	2025	Best Work Award	"Bling-Bang-Bang-Born"	Won	
The Television Drama Academy Awards	2024	Drama Song Awards (First Quarter)	"Nidone"	Won	
Tokyo Drama Awards	2024	Best Theme Song	"Nidone"	Won	
TikTok First Half Trend Awards	2024	Special Award	"Bling-Bang-Bang-Born"	Won	
U-Can New Words and Buzzwords Awards	2024	New Words and Buzzwords Awards	"Bling-Bang-Bang-Born"	Top 10	
Yahoo! Japan Search Awards	2024	Music Category	"Bling-Bang-Bang-Born"	Won	
Dedication Music Awards	2026	Special Devotion Award	Creepy Nuts	Won	
