= The Core (XG album) =

The Core - 核

Studio album by XG
- Released: January 23, 2026
- Genres: Pop; R&B; dance; hip-hop
- Length: 29:48
- Language: English
- Label: Xgalx

XG chronology
Awe (2024)	The Core - 核 (2026)

Alternative cover
- Physical album cover

Singles from The Core
- 1. "Gala" Released: September 19, 2025; 2. "4 Seasons" Released: December 25, 2025; 3. "Hypnotize" Released: January 23, 2026; 4. "Rock the Boat" Released: February 22, 2026

The Core - 核 is the debut studio album by Japanese vocal group XG. It was released on January 23, 2026, through Xgalx, and was the group's follow-up release to their EP, Awe, in 2024. It is the group's first full-length work since their debut in 2022.

The album is described by the group to be a declaration of "X-Pop", a sonic blend of pop, hip hop and R&B, that crosses genre boundaries.

== Background and release ==
In early September 2025, the release of XG's debut album was announced by their label Xgalx, also teasing the lead single "Gala" ahead of its release.

On November 6, 2025, the title and release date for XG's debut album was revealed, with the track list being revealed on December 23, 2025.

== Composition ==
Musically, the album is diverse with genres spanning from pop, house, hip-hop, R&B, and pop-punk.

The Core contains ten tracks, with the opening track "Xignal" being a spacey, synth heavy instrumental intro. "Gala" is a ballroom inspired house and rap track that features the members of XG rapping braggadocious lyrics about their style and high fashion. It was released as the first pre-release single to the album. The lyrics describe members turning the a "Met Gala into an 'X-Gala'". "Take My Breath" is an upbeat dance-pop track taking the electronic direction of "Gala" and softening it with a bubbly sound and lyrical contents of romantic love. It features a French house leaning production with elements of funk.

Staying true to the group's self-described roots, "Rock The Boat", "No Good", and "Up Now" are R&B and hip-hop songs. "Rock The Boat" has lyrics revolving around sensuality and romance. It includes references to the R&B singer Aaliyah, who has a song with the same title. "No Good" is a "silky" track featuring lyrics of confrontation. "Up Now" is a "laid-back" pop and R&B song with sounds reminiscent of the early 2000s similar to Doja Cat.

The sixth track, "Hypnotize", served as the album's lead single. The song is a "runway-ready" techno house and dance track with production featuring rhythmic piano lines. Lyrically, the song talks about enchanting the listeners into a dreamy, hypnotic state.

"O.R.B. (Obviously Reads Bro)" is described as a "bratty" pop-punk song that echoes sounds of the 2000s. The title references the term of endearment the members call each other and the bond it has represented since their training as idols.

"4 Seasons" and “PS118” separate the group into fully vocal-led and fully rap-led songs. The ninth track, “4 Seasons”, is a laid back R&B song featuring an acoustic guitar. The song consists of vocals from Chisa, Hinata, and Juria. The final track, “PS118", is an "old-school" boom-bap rap song. The song was originally the solo debut of Jurin, the group leader, featuring Rapsody, but was later also included in the final track list. The album version includes Jurin, Maya, Harvey, and Cocona.

== Track listing ==
The Core - 核 track listing
No.	Title	Lyrics	Music	Length
1.	"Xignal (The Intro)"		Chancellor; Jakops; Doomsday	1:36
2.	"Gala"	Chancellor; Jakops; Knave; Jaeyoung; Lyricks	Chancellor; Jakops; Knave; Jaeyoung; Lyricks	3:47
3.	"Rock the Boat"		Jakops; Tayor	2:51
4.	"Take My Breath"	Chancellor; Jakops; Knave; Paulina "Pau" Cerrilla; Nick Kandler	Chancellor; Jakops; Knave; Cerrilla; Nick Kandler; Xansei	3:27
5.	"No Good"	Jakops; Chancellor; Benjmn; Feli Ferraro; Akil "worldwidefresh" King	Jakops; Chancellor; Tayor; Benjmn; Feli Ferraro; King; Johnny Goldstein	2:24
6.	"Hypnotize"	Chancellor; Jakops; Cerrilla; Knave, Shintaro Yasuda	Jakops; Chancellor; Yasuda; Cerrilla; Knave; Mason Sacks; her0ism	2:50
7.	"Up Now"	Jakops; Chancellor; Jay Park; OZworld; AKLO; Paloalto; Verbal; Awich; Tak; Dok2	Jakops; Chancellor; Yasuda	3:14
8.	"O.R.B. (Obviously Reads Bro)"	Jakops; Bianca "Blush" Atterberry; Chancellor; Knave; Mychole "Starr" Anderson	Jakops; Bluebird; Scootie; Atterberry; Chancellor; Tayor; Knave; Bastian "B" Testori; tild tomorrow; Anderson	2:28
9.	"4 Seasons"			4:35
10.	"PS118"			2:34
Total length:				29:46
