= IYKYK (disambiguation) =

IYKYK is an abbreviation for 'if you know, you know' often used to describe inside jokes.

IYKYK may also refer to:

- IYKYK (If You Know You Know), song by Illit
- IYKYK, song by Belly
- IYKYK, song by XG
- IYKYK, song by Lil Durk
- IYKYK, song by Dierks Bentley
- IYKYK (EP), extended play by Omega X
