= Shooting Star (XG song) =

Single by XG
- B-side: "Left Right"
- Released: January 25, 2023
- Label: Xgalx
- Songwriters: Patrick "j.Que" Smith; Poe Leos; Xansei; AMarri Gildersleeve; Amelia Moore; Brooklyn Kenaisya Johnson; Clint Ford; Dayday; JAKOPS; Jason Jermaine Daxon; Matt Kali; Olay; Rambo Kay; Seann Bowe; Sheldon Body Jr.
- Producers: Xansei; Bowe; Ford; Kali; JAKOPS

XG singles chronology
| "Mascara" (2022) | "Shooting Star" (2023) | "Grl Gvng" (2023) |

Music video
- "Shooting Star" on YouTube

"Shooting Star" is a song by Japanese vocal group XG. It was released as a single on January 25, 2023, by Xgalx. A music video was released on the same day.

== Background and release ==
On January 25, 2023, XG released "Shooting Star", featuring the B-side "Left Right". A music video for "Shooting Star" was released on the same day.

== Composition ==
Rolling Stone India described "Shooting Star" as "a dreamy pop groove" and "a bass-driven hip-hop track with trap influences" with "a unique sound of bells running all through."

In an interview with BuzzFeed, Harvey stated that the single "aim to convey the significance of staying true to oneself." In NME, Cocona similarly stated that the singles represented ideas like "trust yourself and be what you want to be" and "the desire to push forward without being influenced by others, and to stay determined."

== Remix ==
On April 7, 2023, XG released a remix of "Shooting Star" featuring a verse from Rico Nasty.

== Other ==
On December 18, 2023, XG appeared on The First Take to perform a live, one-take rendition of "Shooting Star."

== Track listing ==
"Shooting Star" track listing
| No. | Title | Lyrics | Music | Length |
|---|---|---|---|---|
| 1. | "Shooting Star" | Patrick "j.Que" Smith; Poe Leos; Xansei; AMarri Gildersleeve; Amelia Moore; Brooklyn Kenaisya Johnson; Clint Ford; Dayday; JAKOPS; Jason Jermaine Daxon; Matt Kali; Olay; Rambo Kay; Seann Bowe; Sheldon Body Jr. | Xansei; Bowe; Ford; Kali; JAKOPS | 3:33 |
| 2. | "Left Right" | Chancellor; JAKOPS; Knave; Purple | Chancellor; JAKOPS | 3:28 |
| Total length: | | | | 6:51 |
