= Cocona =

Cocona may refer to:

- Solanum sessiliflorum, a tropical shrub also known as the cocona
- Cocona Hiraki, a Japanese skateboarder
- Cocona (rapper), a Japanese rapper and member of XG

== See also ==
- Kokona, a Local Government Area in Nigeria
- Coconut, a member of the palm family
