= 2025 MTV Video Music Awards Japan =

23rd edition of the MTV Video Music Awards Japan held in 2025

- Date: March 19, 2025
- Location: K-Arena, Yokohama, Kanagawa
- Country: Japan
- Hosted by: Hiccorohee; Seiya
- Most awards: Aespa; Mrs. Green Apple (4)
- Website: vmaj.jp

Television/radio coverage
- Network: MTV Japan

The 2025 MTV Video Music Awards Japan were held at K-Arena, Yokohama, Kanagawa Prefecture on March 19, 2025. The show was hosted by Hiccorohee and Seiya (Shimofuri Myojo).

== Winners and nominees ==
The winners for all categories were announced on February 28, 2025, except Video of the Year, which announced at the ceremony.

Winners are listed first and highlighted in bold.

Video of the Year
**Mrs. Green Apple – "Lilac"**; Kenshi Yonezu – "Sayonara, Mata Itsuka!"; Lady Gaga – "Disease"; Aespa – "Whiplash"; Me:I – "Click"; Benson Boone – "Beautiful Things"; Ano and Lilas Ikuta – "Zezezezettai Seiiki" and "Seishun Ōka"; Rosé and Bruno Mars – "Apt."; Hitsujibungaku – "Burning"; Aina the End – "Love Sick"; Nogizaka46 – "Hodōkyō"; Kroi – "Jewel"; Yuki Chiba – "Team Tomodachi"; Aespa – "Supernova"; Aespa – "Armageddon"; Tomoo – "Present"; XG – "Woke Up"; Be:First – "Masterplan"; INI – "WMDA (Where My Drums At)"; Gemn – "Fatal"; Fruits Zipper – "New Kawaii"; Omoinotake – "Ikuokukonen"; Kocchi no Kento – "Hai Yorokonde"
Best Solo Artist Video (Japan)	Best Solo Artist Video (International)
**Kenshi Yonezu – "Sayonara, Mata Itsuka!"**	Lady Gaga – "Disease"
Best Group Video (Japan)	Best Group Video (International)
**Mrs. Green Apple – "Lilac"**	Aespa – "Whiplash"
Best New Artist Video (Japan)	Best New Artist Video (International)
**Me:I – "Click"**	Benson Boone – "Beautiful Things"
Best Collaboration Video (Japan)	Best Collaboration Video (International)
**Ano and Lilas Ikuta – "Zezezezettai Seiiki" and "Seishun Ōka"**	Rosé and Bruno Mars – "Apt."
Best Rock Video	Best Alternative Video
**Hitsujibungaku – "Burning"**	Aina the End – "Love Sick"
Best Pop Video	Best R&B Video
**Nogizaka46 – "Hodōkyō"**	Kroi – "Jewel"
Best Hip Hop Video	Best Dance Video
**Yuki Chiba – "Team Tomodachi"**	Aespa – "Supernova"
Best K-Pop Video	Best Creative Video
**Aespa – "Armageddon"**	Tomoo – "Present"
Best Art Direction Video	Best Visual Effect
**Mrs. Green Apple – "Lilac"**	XG – "Woke Up"
Best Cinematography	Best Editing
**Mrs. Green Apple – "Lilac"**	Be:First – "Masterplan"
Best Choreography	Best Trending Video
**INI – "WMDA (Where My Drums At)"**	Gemn – "Fatal"
Best Breakthrough Video	Best Storytelling Video
**Fruits Zipper – "New Kawaii"**	Omoinotake – "Ikuokukonen"
Best Animation Video
**Kocchi no Kento – "Hai Yorokonde"**

=== Special awards ===
Artist of the Year	Group of the Year
**Aespa**	SixTones
Song of the Year	Album of the Year
**Creepy Nuts – "Bling-Bang-Bang-Born"**	Official Hige Dandism – Rejoice
Inspiration Award Japan	Performance of the Year
**TM Network**	XG
Best Asia Group	Best Asia Celebrity
**JO1**	Leah Dou
MTV Breakthrough Song	Best Teen Choice Artist
**Cutie Street – "Kawaii Dake ja Dame Desu ka?"**	Noa
Upcoming Dance & Vocal Group	Future Icons Award
**Is:sue**; **One or Eight**	Kocchi no Kento
Rising Star Award	Daisy Bell Award
**Sawamura Kirari**	Inabakumori – "Relay Outer"
Best K-Star Rookie	Best Buzz Award
**Plave**	&Team
Best Live Performance	Best Producer
**Sakurazaka46**	Jakops (Simon)
