= 15 (Tuki album) =

Studio album by Tuki
- Released: January 8, 2025
- Genre: J-pop
- Length: 47:54
- Language: Japanese
- Label: The Lunar Landing Plan
- Producer: Tuki

Tuki chronology
15 (2025)	15 – Live Edition (Nippon Budokan) (2026)

Singles from 15
- 1. "Bansanka" Released: September 29, 2023; 2. "Ichirinka" Released: November 28, 2023; 3. "Sakura Kimi Watashi" Released: January 1, 2024; 4. "Inferno Love Letter" Released: April 16, 2024; 5. "At Hoshimachi Station" Released: June 19, 2024; 6. "Hyururirapappa" Released: July 24, 2024; 7. "Love Expiration Date" Released: September 29, 2024; 8. "Aimoraimo" Released: November 6, 2024

15 is the debut studio album by Japanese singer-songwriter Tuki. It was released on January 8, 2025, by her independent label the Lunar Landing Plan. Titled after her age when she started writing songs, the album consists of 15 tracks, including her breakthrough number-one single "Bansanka". Commercially, 15 peaked at number four on the Oricon Albums Chart and number 18 on the Billboard Japan Hot Albums.

== Background and release ==
A 15-year-old singer-songwriter Tuki released her debut single "Bansanka" on September 23, 2023. The song became her breakthrough, rising up to number one on both the Oricon Combined Singles Chart and Billboard Japan Hot 100 in January 2024, and making her the youngest solo artist that have the song surpassing 100 million in Billboard Japan history. It was one of the best performing songs in 2024.

On November 22, 2024, following the release of her single "Aimoraimo" and the 75th NHK Kōhaku Uta Gassen participation announcement, Tuki announced her debut studio album 15, alongside track list, which comprises 15 tracks, including seven unreleased tracks and two CD-exclusive bonus tracks. The title refers to the age of Tuki when she wrote songs for the album. The limited edition of the album includes Usagi-san doll and "Special Book", including self-written liner notes, a conversation with Usagi, who runs Lunar Landing Plan label with the singer, and Q&A sessions.

On January 1, 2025, Tuki teased snippets of the album's tracks via YouTube. A music video for the third track "Pure Love Ingot" was uploaded on the same day as 15 release. "Moon Landing Plan", a namesake of Tuki's label, was chosen by Suzuki for Solio Bandit commercial's jingle, starring Kanna Hashimoto.

== Commercial performance ==
15 debuted at number four on both the Oricon Albums Chart and the Combined Albums Chart for the date issued January 20, 2025, selling 12,891 copies. For Billboard Japan, the album entered the Hot Albums at number 18. It earned 12,181 CD and 1,973 downloads, topping the Download Albums.

== Track listing ==
All tracks are written by Tuki and arranged by Usagi.

15 track listing
No.	Title	Length
1.	"Bansanka" (晩餐歌)	3:37
2.	"Moon Landing Plan" (月面着陸計画)	4:02
3.	"Pure Love Ingot" (純恋愛のインゴット)	4:04
4.	"Aimoraimo" (アイモライモ)	4:16
5.	"Marlboro" (マルボロ)	3:53
6.	"At Hoshimachi Station" (星街の駅で)	3:58
7.	"Seesaw" (シーソー)	3:25
8.	"Sakura Kimi Watashi" (サクラキミワタシ)	3:24
9.	"Hyururirapappa" (ひゅるりらぱっぱ)	3:20
10.	"Inferno Love Letter" (地獄恋文)	2:50
11.	"The Lonely Whale" (孤独の鯨)	3:37
12.	"Ichirinka" (一輪花)	3:45
13.	"Love Expiration Date" (愛の賞味期限)	3:38
Total length:		47:54

15 physical bonus track
No.	Title	Length
14.	"Love Expiration Date" (rock version)	3:46
15.	"Sakura Kimi Watashi" (piano version)	3:21
Total length:		55:02

== Charts ==
=== Weekly charts ===
Weekly chart performance for 15
Chart (2025)	Peak position
Japanese Albums (Oricon)	4
Japanese Combined Albums (Oricon)	4
Japanese Indie Albums (Oricon)	2
Japanese Hot Albums (Billboard Japan)	18

=== Monthly charts ===
Monthly chart performance for 15
Chart (2025)	Position
Japanese Albums (Oricon)	13

=== Year-end charts ===
Year-end chart performance for 15
Chart (2025)	Position
Japanese Indie Albums (Oricon)	11
Japanese Hot Albums (Billboard Japan)	58
