= Tuki (singer) =

Japanese singer-songwriter

- Logo used by Tuki

Background information
- Born: 2008 or 2009 (age 17–18)
- Genre: J-pop
- Occupation: Singer-songwriter
- Years active: 2023–present
- Label: The Lunar Landing Plan
- Website: tuki-official.net

Tuki (stylized as tuki.) is a Japanese singer-songwriter. Her debut single "Bansanka" released in September 2023 took the top spot on the Billboard Japan Hot 100 chart on January 24, 2024, making her the youngest artist in the chart's history to surpass a 100 million views on streaming services. Tuki works annonymously, keeping her face hidden in music videos and live performances.

== Life and career ==
Tuki started playing the guitar at the age of 13 and soon began uploading videos of performances of her original songs and covers on TikTok. She chooses to remain anonymous, and performs without showing her face. She chose the name Tuki, meaning 'moon' in Japanese, due to her love of the moon and its "mysterious image".

=== 2023 ===
On July 7, 2023, the chorus of an original song "Bansanka" was posted on TikTok without revealing its title. Subsequently, the first verse and bridge of the song were uploaded and on August 16, the chorus was reposted under the official title "Bansanka". The song became popular on TikTok, where it was used in various videos and covered by numerous users. On September 3, her official YouTube channel was opened.

"Bansanka" was released on September 29 to coincide with Otsukimi. On the same day, "Bansanka" became available on the DAM karaoke service. The acoustic version of "Bansanka" was released on September 30 on YouTube, reaching a million views within a few days. "Bansanka" was made available on the Joysound karaoke service on October 8. "Bansanka" took the top spot on Spotify's Daily Viral Songs (Japan) and Viral Top 50 (Japan) charts on October 18 and October 21, respectively.

On November 28, Tuki released her second single, "Ichirinka" on streaming services together with the music video on YouTube. The video was animated by Urara.

On December 24, the music video for "Bansanka" was released. Illustrations for the music video were provided by Posuka Demizu, known for having drawn the manga The Promised Neverland.

=== 2024 ===
On January 10, 2024, Tuki's third single "Sakura Kimi Watashi" was released on streaming services. It was also announced that the song would be used as an insert song for AbemaTV's dating reality series I Fell in Love with You Today – Graduation Edition.

On January 24, Tuki took the top spot on Oricon's Weekly Digital Ranking chart for the first time with "Bansanka". It was announced on January 25 that Tuki took the top spot on Oricon's Weekly Singles Ranking chart as well with "Bansanka".

"Bansanka" took the first place on the Billboard Japan Hot 100 chart on January 24. She became the youngest solo artist on the chart to surpass 100 million streams.

On April 20, Tuki made her first television appearance without revealing her face on Nippon TV's music TV show, Buzz Rhythm. On December 31, she performed "Bansanka" on the 75th NHK Kōhaku Uta Gassen.

=== 2025 ===
Tuki released her debut studio album 15 on January 8, 2025.

== Discography ==
=== Studio albums ===
List of studio albums, showing selected details, selected chart positions, and sales figures
Title	Details	Peak positions			Sales
Title	Details	JPN	JPN Cmb.	JPN Hot	Sales
15	Released: January 8, 2025; Label: The Lunar Landing Plan; Formats: CD, DL, streaming	4	4	18	JPN: 19,568

=== Live albums ===
List of live albums, showing selected details, selected chart positions, and sales figures
Title	Details	Peak positions	
Title	Details	JPN Dig.	JPN DL
15 – Live Edition (Nippon Budokan)	Released: May 27, 2026; Label: The Lunar Landing Plan; Formats: DL, streaming	29	36

=== Singles ===
List of singles, showing year released, selected chart positions, and name of the album
Title	Year	Peak positions			Album
Title	Year	JPN Cmb.	JPN Hot	WW	Album
"Bansanka" (晩餐歌)	2023	1	1	153	15
"Ichirinka" (一輪花)	2023	—	—	—	15
"Sakura Kimi Watashi" (サクラキミワタシ)	2024	—	73	—	15
"Inferno Love Letter" (地獄恋文)	2024	—	77	—	15
"At Hoshimachi Station" (星街の駅で)	2024	—	—	—	15
"Hyururirapappa" (ひゅるりらぱっぱ)	2024	—	—	—	15
"Love Expiration Date" (愛の賞味期限)	2024	—	—	—	15
"Aimoraimo" (アイモライモ)	2024	—	—	—	15
"Damashiai" (騙シ愛)	2025	—	52	—	TBA
"Strangerz" (ストレンジャーズ)	2025	—	—	—	TBA
"Seimei" (声命)	2025	—	—	—	TBA
"Guilty" (ギルティ)	2025	—	—	—	TBA
"Saitei Kaiwai" (最低界隈)	2025	—	—	—	TBA
"Song of Life" (人生讃歌)	2025	—	—	—	TBA
"Koto no Ha" (コトノハ)	2026	—	—	—	TBA
"Zero" (零)	2026	—	—	—	TBA
"SOS"	2026	—	—	—	TBA
"The Third Planet" (第三惑星)	2026	—	—	—	TBA
"Bubble" (第三惑星)	2026	—	—	—	TBA
"—" denotes releases that did not chart or were not released in that region.

== Awards and nominations ==
Name of the award ceremony, year presented, award category, nominee(s) of the award, and the result of the nomination
Award ceremony	Year	Category	Nominee(s)/work(s)	Result	Ref.
Music Awards Japan	2025	Best New Artist	Tuki	Won	
Music Awards Japan	2025	Best Japanese Singer-Songwriter Song	"Bansanka"	Nominated	
Music Awards Japan	2025	Karaoke of the Year: J-Pop	"Bansanka"	Nominated	
