= Woke Up =

2024 single by XG

Single by XG
- Released: May 21, 2024
- Genre: Hip hop; Trap
- Length: 3:08
- Label: Xgalx
- Songwriters: Shintaro Yasuda; Chancellor; Jaeyoung; Jakops; Lyricks
- Producers: Jakops; Shintaro Yasuda; Chancellor

XG singles chronology
"Undefeated" (2024)	"Woke Up" (2024)	"Something Ain't Right" (2024)

"Woke Up" is a song by Japanese vocal group XG. It was released through Xgalx on May 21, 2024 and is considered the group's first song to be entirely composed of rapping. The song was a top-ten hit and certified gold in the group's home country.

A remix of "Woke Up" with various Japanese and South Korean rappers was released on September 20, 2024. The remix was subsequently included on XG's second EP, Awe, which was released on November 8, 2024.

== Composition ==
‘Woke Up’ really takes XG in this whole new direction. We want to take on a new challenge—that’s something that we always want to do and embrace as XG. With this all-rap track, it really kind of goes back to our hip-hop identity and taps into that culture. As XG, we aren’t going to stop; this is just the beginning of something even bigger. We’re going to constantly update and evolve ourselves.

— Cocona in an interview for Vogue Singapore

"Woke Up" is anchored by 808 bass and West Asian sounds. Jurin stated that the song's lyrics are about "challenging the status quo and breaking those stereotypes and boundaries that are all around us."

The song features entirely rap verses from the seven members of XG. According to Jurin, the song is "XG's first all-rap song featuring all seven members." Similarly, Maya specifically noted that it would be the first time that XG's vocalists would be rapping. Chisa, a vocalist, noted that rapping was both fun and challenging.

== Music video ==
The music video for "Woke Up" features XG's seven members with "different coloured eyes, bold haircuts, grills and Y2K inspired alternative fashion looks," as well as their transformation into "edgy, gothic wolves." With regard to the choreography, "Woke Up" features less unified dancing and instead showcases "smaller groups" with "a lot of variation" in movement. The music video's concept and design was spearheaded by South Korean photographer Cho Gi-seok. In an interview with Vogue Taiwan, Jang Heejun, XG's stylist for the music video, called breaking rules and established stereotypes the most important concept of the video.

Wolf elements are incorporated throughout the costumes, including a football helmet shaped like a wolf, leather jackets with wolf eyes, and headdresses with wolf ears. All of these are custom-made and were produced in collaboration with brands such as Bad Binch Tongtong, Dipesta, and Sapiensi, taking about three weeks to complete.

The music video also features a scene where member Cocona shaves their head. Cocona explained that it was one of the hairstyles that they had always wanted to try and said, "I decided to shave my head because I wanted to convey that I hope people all over the world will love themselves just as they are, regardless of feminine fashion, makeup, hair, or anything like that."

Vogue Singapore called the music video "reminiscent of the days that K-pop used to carry with it that same defiant, rebellious energy; when each new-generation group laid bare their own version of theatrical beauty—the kind that would make a statement on its own," specifically mentioning 2NE1 and F(x) as examples. Lifted wrote that "The storyline and graphics are Hollywood-esque as they transform into wolves ready to tear the party up."

The music video for "Woke Up" won the "Best Visual Effects" award at the 2025 MTV Video Music Awards Japan.

== Remix ==
On September 20, 2024, XG released a remix of "Woke Up" featuring entirely new verses in English, Korean, and Japanese by Jay Park, OZworld, AKLO, Paloalto, Verbal, Awich, Tak, and Dok2. The remix was later included as the seventh track on XG's second EP, Awe.

== Promotion ==
On June 14, 2024, XG performed "Woke Up" and "X-Gene" from their debut EP New DNA on TV Asahi's Music Station. This was their first performance on Japanese television.

In Tokyo, Japan, XG collaborated with fashion retail store GR8 on a "Woke Up" photo exhibition which was open on June 15–16, 2024 at the city's GR8 location. Clothing merchandise was designed by Japanese artist Kosuke Kawamura.

== Critical reception ==
Lauding "Woke Up" as "a pretty good song," Stereogum observed the group's "different ratatat flows" and "levels of charisma and energy," comparing them to "early Brockhampton if they were all Japanese girls and if they had an absolutely unlimited music-video budget." InStyle noted that the song had "a darker, more menacing mood than the group has offered before."

"Woke Up" was nominated for the "Top Global Hit from Japan", "Best Japanese Hip Hop/Rap Song" and the "Best of Listeners' Choice: Japanese Song" awards at the 2025 Music Awards Japan.

== Charts ==
=== Weekly charts ===
Weekly chart performance for "Woke Up"
Chart (2024)	Peak position
Global Excl. US (Billboard)	183
Japan (Japan Hot 100)	5
Japan (Oricon)	17
Japan Combined Singles (Oricon)	7
Singapore Regional (RIAS)	24
South Korean Albums (Circle)	12

=== Monthly charts ===
Monthly chart performance for "Woke Up"
Chart (2024)	Position
Japan (Oricon)	17

== Certifications ==
Certifications for "Woke Up"
Region	Certification	Certified units/sales
Streaming
Japan (RIAJ)	Gold	50,000,000^{†}
^{†} Streaming-only figures based on certification alone.
