= XG (group) =

Japanese vocal group

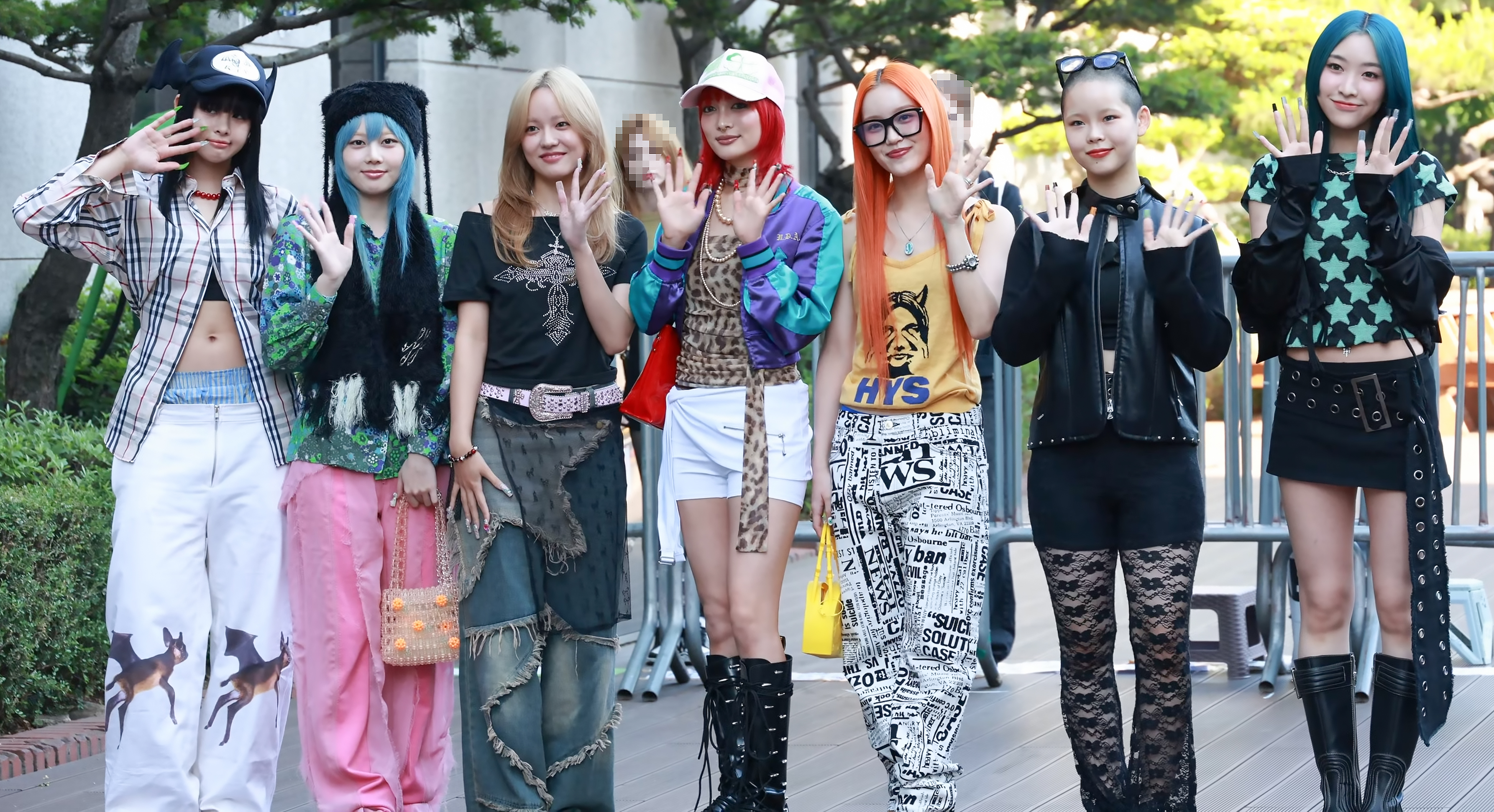
- XG in May 2024; L–R: Harvey, Hinata, Juria, Jurin, Chisa, Cocona, and Maya

Background information
- Origin: Japan
- Genres: R&B; Hip-hop
- Years active: 2022–present
- Labels: Xgalx; Avex Trax
- Members: Jurin; Chisa; Hinata; Harvey; Juria; Maya; Cocona
- Website: xgalx.com/xg/

XG (Japanese: エックスジー; Korean: 엑스지; an initialism for "Xtraordinary Genes") is a Japanese vocal group formed by Xgalx, a subsidiary of Avex, consisting of seven members: Jurin, Chisa, Hinata, Harvey, Juria, Maya, and Cocona. Describing themselves as a global group, XG promotes music under the self-coined concept of "X-Pop", with an official discography performed entirely in English, while supplementary content series including XG Tape and XG Vox feature the group performing in English, Japanese, and Korean. After spending approximately five years training between Japan and South Korea, the group debuted on March 18, 2022, with the digital single "Tippy Toes".

== History ==
=== 2022–2023: Formation, introduction, and debut ===
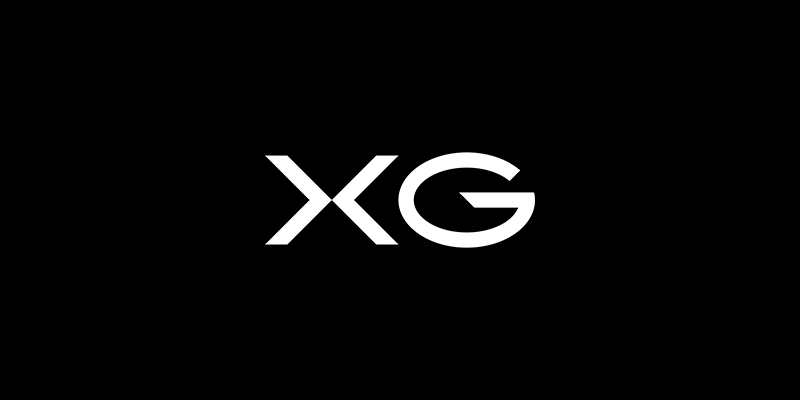
XG's official logo

XG's members were scouted from thousands across Japan in 2016, with twenty-one trainees ultimately selected for the project. Over the following five years, the group trained between Japan and South Korea, living together in dormitories while undergoing daily lessons in singing, dancing, and multiple languages. Founding executive producer Simon (JAKOPS) oversaw their development, drawing on his own experience debuting and working as a producer within the Korean idol system before becoming an independent producer. The trainees were gradually narrowed down to the final seven members: Jurin, Chisa, Hinata, Harvey, Juria, Maya, and Cocona.

XG's social media accounts were launched on January 25, 2022, with a short video entitled Xgalx – The Beginning. The video showed several girls in training for the Xgalx Project. This was followed by a dance performance video directed by Choi Hyo-jin, of the Korean street dance TV show Street Woman Fighter. Over the next few weeks, the group released a series of teaser content, including a rap video featuring Jurin and Harvey performing a cover of Rob Stone's "Chill Bill", and a vocal cover video of Justin Bieber's "Peaches", performed by Juria and Chisa.

On March 18, 2022, XG made their debut with the release of their all English-language digital single "Tippy Toes". On June 29, they released their second all English-language single titled "Mascara", followed by their first television appearance on South Korean Mnet's M Countdown performing the single. On November 17, XG released a rap cypher video entitled Galz Xypher. The video became viral on a TikTok through an XG fan account, gaining over 15 million views on the platform.

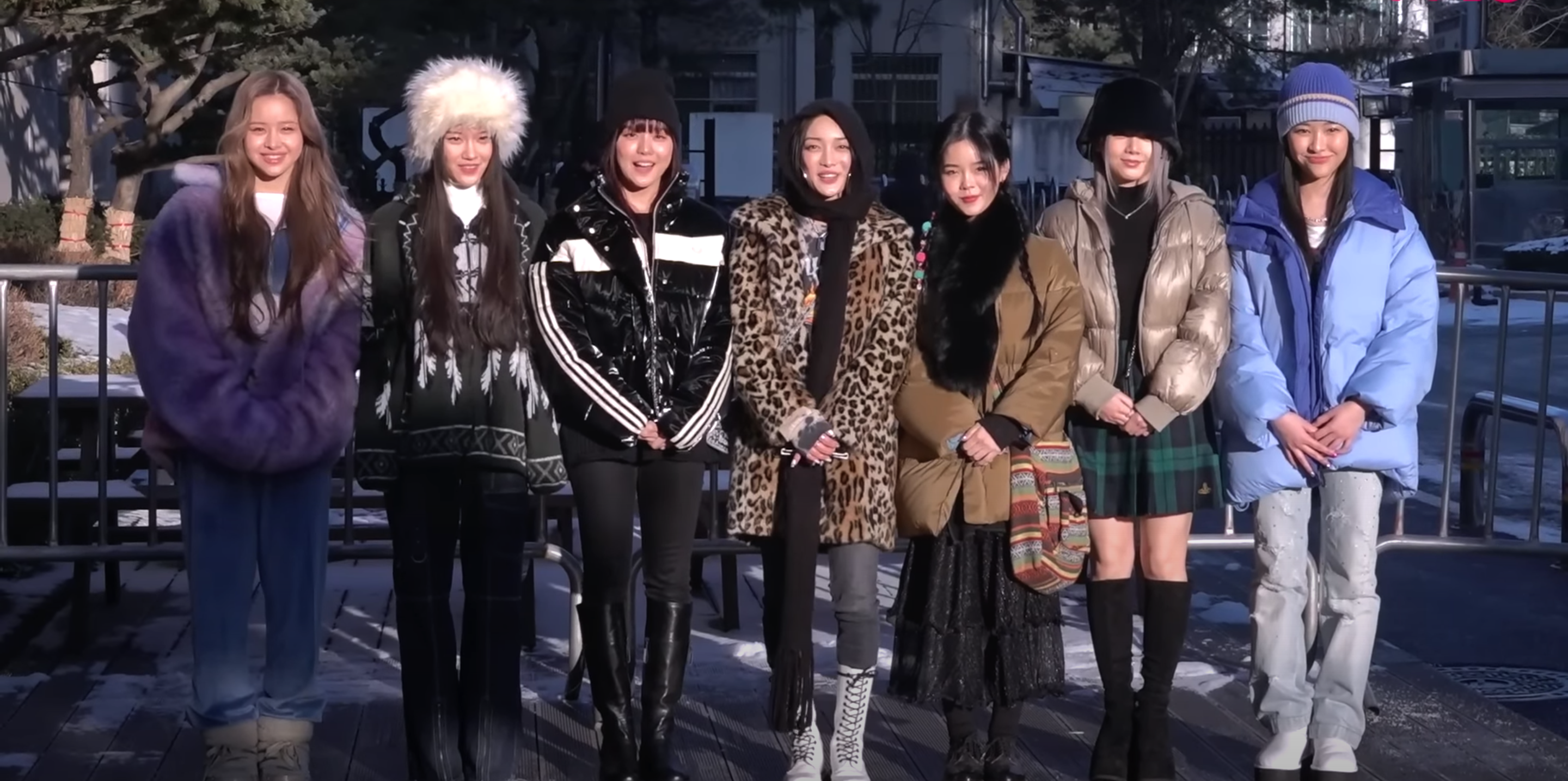
XG in January 2023

On January 25, 2023, XG released their third all English-language single, Shooting Star, its music video, and an additional track titled "Left Right". On March 6, XG entered the Mediabase US Radio Top 40, becoming the first female Japanese artist and the first Japanese group to do so. On June 30, XG released "Grl Gvng" as a pre-release single preceding their debut EP New DNA. In August, XG released the second and third pre-singles "TGIF" and "New Dance". On September 27, New DNA was released alongside its lead single "Puppet Show". The EP was certified gold by the Recording Industry Association of Japan (RIAJ) for shipments of over 100,000 copies.

=== 2024–present: Valorant, world tour, Awe, and The Core - 核 ===
In March 2024, XG announced their first world tour, with shows across Asia, North America, and Europe in October and November. On April 12, XG collaborated with Riot Games to release the single "Undefeated" for the online video game Valorant. One month later, on May 21, they released another single titled "Woke Up". Toward the end of the year, XG released several more singles, including "Something Ain't Right" on July 26 and "IYKYK" on October 11, in anticipation of their second EP, Awe. On November 8, XG released Awe alongside a music video for the lead single, "Howling". On November 20, it was announced that XG would be performing at the 2025 Coachella Music Festival.

On September 19, 2025, XG released the music video "Gala". On December 6, Cocona revealed on their 20th birthday that they are transmasculine and non-binary, having undergone top surgery earlier in the year, and thanked the rest of XG for supporting their identity. On December 16, the group performed on The Voice's season 28 finale; it was XG's first appearance on American television. On January 23, 2026, XG released their first full-length album, The Core - 核, and the music video for its lead single "Hypnotize".

XG's second world tour, "XG World Tour: The Core", began on February 6, 2026. The tour began in Yokohama, Japan and is scheduled to continue across Japan, Asia, North America, the United Kingdom, Europe, Australia and Latin America. That same month, XG was announced as part of the lineup for Fuji Rock Festival '26. On November 6, XG released "Depends", an electropop and R&B single, with "S.A.D". serving as its b-side. "Depends" was first performed on a stop at Crypto.com Arena in Los Angeles on the tour.

== Artistry ==
=== Identity ===
The group's name, XG, originally stood for "Xtraordinary Girls", reflecting the group's ambition to empower young people worldwide through music and performance. In January 2026, Xgalx reinterpreted the initialism as "Xtraordinary Genes", a change Xgalx described as symbolizing creativity, a commitment to creating new culture beyond conventional norms, and an aspiration to empower people from diverse backgrounds. Member Maya explained that while "'Girls' represents where we started, but 'Genes' reflects a deeper core and what makes us who we are". Members Chisa and Jurin have similarly described the change as reflecting a message that "it's okay to be yourself as you are" and a broader commitment to "breaking fixed ideas and preconceptions". The timing of the announcement followed member Cocona publicly coming out as transmasculine and nonbinary in December 2025, with Cocona noting that the experience was among the personal motivations behind the renewed meaning.

=== Concept ===
XG promotes its music under the concept of "X-Pop" — a term the group coined to describe a musical philosophy that deliberately resists genre boundaries. Drawing from Black American R&B, hip-hop, pop-punk, and dance, X-Pop is designed to be universal, not rooted in any single culture, country, or convention. As member Jurin explains, the "X" represents infinite possibilities. XG's recordings draw on an international pool of songwriters and producers spanning Japan, South Korea, and the United States, reflecting the group's borderless creative approach.

Beyond their music, XG has built a career-long fictional universe in which the members portray themselves as alien-wolves. Member Juria describes "aliens" as representing limitlessness and freedom from convention, while the wolf pack metaphor captures the group's collective strength and unity.

=== Genres ===
XG's music covers genres such as hip-hop and R&B with elements of EDM and psychedelic music. On services such as Spotify, they are placed under the K-pop and Japanese dance-pop genres. XG calls themselves a "global group" and their sound "X-pop", which is neither K-pop or J-pop. XG sings in Korean, Japanese and English in order to help their music reach a wider audience.

== Endorsements ==
In February 2025, XG became the face of cosmetics brand Anessa and the group's song "Is This Love" was used as the theme song for its global campaign. On April 4, 2025, XG appeared at Shanghai Fashion Week as models for Nike's "Victory Lap" collection. XG has also been featured in promotions for McDonald's Japan on February 10 and September 29, 2025 for "Real-Time MacPa with XG" and "Blue Mac Day" respectively.

== Members ==
- Chisa (チサ; 치사)
- Hinata (ヒナタ; 히나타)
- Jurin (ジュリン; 주린) – leader
- Harvey (ハーヴィー; 하비)
- Juria (ジュリア; 쥬리아)
- Maya (マヤ; 마야)
- Cocona (ココナ; 코코나)

== Discography ==
=== Studio albums ===
List of studio albums, showing selected details, selected chart positions, sales, and certifications
Title	Details	Peak chart positions						Sales	Certifications
Title	Details	JPN	JPN Cmb.	JPN Hot	AUS	KOR	US	Sales	Certifications
The Core	Released: January 23, 2026; Label: Xgalx; Formats: CD, LP, digital download, streaming	5	5	1	85	13	93	JPN: 87,413 total; KOR: 16,833	RIAJ: Gold (phy.)

=== Extended plays ===
List of extended plays, showing selected details, selected chart positions, sales, and certifications
Title	Details	Peak chart positions					Sales	Certifications
Title	Details	JPN	JPN Cmb.	JPN Hot	KOR	US	Sales	Certifications
New DNA	Released: September 27, 2023; Label: Xgalx; Formats: CD, digital download, streaming	2	2	1	8	—	JPN: 40,000; KOR: 34,272	RIAJ: Gold (phy.)
Awe	Released: November 8, 2024; Label: Xgalx; Formats: CD, LP, digital download, streaming	3	3	3	15	175	JPN: 60,137; KOR: 33,284	RIAJ: Gold (phy.)
"—" denotes releases that did not chart or were not released in that region.

=== Remix albums ===
List of remix albums, showing selected details
Title	Details
XDM Unidentified Waves	Released: January 31, 2025; Label: Xgalx; Formats: Digital download, streaming

=== Singles ===
List of singles, showing year released, selected chart positions, sales, certifications, and album name
Title	Year	Peak chart positions									Sales	Certifications	Album
Title	Year	JPN	JPN Cmb.	JPN Hot	KOR Album	HUN	NZ Hot	SGP	US D/E	WW Excl. US	Sales	Certifications	Album
"Tippy Toes"	2022	—	—	—	—	—	—	—	—	—			Non-album singles
"Mascara"	2022	—	27	14	—	—	—	—	—	—		RIAJ: Gold (st.)	Non-album singles
"Shooting Star"	2023	—	27	26	—	32	—	23	—	144	JPN: 4,151 (dig.)	RIAJ: Gold (st.)	Non-album singles
"Grl Gvng"	2023	—	—	94	—	—	16	—	—	—	JPN: 1,635 (dig.)		New DNA
"TGIF"	2023	—	—	93	—	—	33	—	—	—	JPN: 1,220 (dig.)		New DNA
"New Dance"	2023	—	—	18	—	—	—	—	—	—	JPN: 1,498 (dig.)	RIAJ: Gold (st.)	New DNA
"Puppet Show"	2023	—	—	63	—	—	—	—	—	—			New DNA
"Winter Without You"	2023	—	—	58	—	—	—	—	—	—			Non-album singles
"Undefeated" (with Valorant)	2024	—	—	— (Note: "Undefeated" did not enter the Billboard Japan Hot 100, but peaked at number 60 on the Download Songs.)	—	—	—	—	—	—			Non-album singles
"Woke Up"	2024	5	7	5	12	—	—	— (Note: "Woke Up" did not enter the RIAS Top Streaming Chart, but peaked at number 24 on the Top Regional Chart.)	—	183	JPN: 32,606 (phy.); KOR: 27,694	RIAJ: Gold (st.)	Non-album singles
"Something Ain't Right"	2024	—	24	20	—	—	18	—	36	161		RIAJ: Gold (st.)	Awe
"IYKYK"	2024	—	33	13	—	—	25	—	—	—		RIAJ: Gold (st.)	Awe
"Howling"	2024	—	—	44	—	—	30	—	—	—			Awe
"Is This Love"	2025	—	33	24	—	—	—	—	—	—		RIAJ: Gold (st.)	Awe
"In the Rain"	2025	—	—	—	—	—	—	—	—	—			Awe
"Million Places"	2025	2	3	6	23	—	—	—	—	—	JPN: 30,071 (phy.); KOR: 8,972		Non-album single
"Gala"	2025	—	34	11	—	—	—	—	—	—			The Core
"4 Seasons"	2025	—	—	—	—	—	—	—	—	—			The Core
"Hypnotize"	2026	—	—	18	—	—	7	— (Note: "Hypnotize" did not enter the Official Singapore Chart, but peaked at number 29 on the Official Singapore Regional Chart.)	—	—			The Core
"Depends"	2026	—	24	9	—	—	8	— (Note: "Depends" did not enter the Official Singapore Chart, but peaked at number 17 on the Official Singapore Regional Chart.)	—	180			Non-album single
"—" denotes releases that did not chart or were not released in that region.

=== Other charted songs ===
List of other charted songs, showing year released, selected chart positions, certifications, and album name
Title	Year	Peaks			Certifications	Album
Title	Year	JPN Hot	SGP Reg.	US Pop	Certifications	Album
"Left Right"	2023	—	22	27	RIAJ: Gold (st.)	Non-album single
"Rock the Boat"	2026	80	—	—		The Core

== Videography ==
=== Music videos ===
Title	Year	Director(s)	Ref.
"Tippy Toes"	2022	Jeong Nu-ri (Cosmo)	
"Mascara"	2022	Paranoid Paradigm (VM Project Architecture)	
"Shooting Star"	2023	Rima Yoon, Jang Dong-ju (Rigend Film)	
"Left Right"	2023	Jinooya Makes	
"Grl Gvng"	2023	Cho Gi-seok	
"TGIF"	2023	Rima Yoon, Jang Dong-ju (Rigend Film)	
"New Dance"	2023	Seo Dong-hyuk (Flipevil)	
"Puppet Show"	2023	Hong Min-ho (Studio Achilles)	
"Winter Without You"	2023	Yvng Wing (Aedia Studio)	
"Woke Up"	2024	Cho Gi-seok	
"Something ain't Right"	2024	Yvng Wing	
"IYKYK"	2024	Rima Yoon	
"Howling"	2024	Cho Gi-seok	
"Is This Love"	2025	Kim Zi-yong	
"In the Rain"	2025	Jihoon Sheen (Someofuz)	
"Gala"	2025	Cho Gi-Seok	
"Hypnotize"	2026	Kim In Tae	
"Rock The Boat"	2026	Soze (Studio Ga.ze)	
"O.R.B (Obviously Reads Bro)"	2026	Jimmy (Via)	
"Depends"	2026	Anthony Yano Hays	

== Awards and nominations ==
Name of the award ceremony, year presented, award category, nominee(s) of the award, and the result of the nomination
Award ceremony	Year	Category	Nominee(s) / Work(s)	Result	Ref.
K-Star MVA (Note: A Japan-Korea joint project held by Idol Champ, a global support app for K-pop idols. It awards Best Artist to those most supported by global K-pop fans, and Next Star to those who will carry the future of K-pop.)	2023	Next Star – Women	XG	Won	
MTV Video Music Awards Japan	2022	Rising Star Award	XG	Won	
MTV Video Music Awards Japan	2025	Best Visual Effects	"Woke Up"	Won	
Music Awards Japan	2025	Top Global Hit from Japan	"Woke Up"	Nominated	
Music Awards Japan	2025	Best Japanese Hip Hop/Rap Song	"Woke Up"	Nominated	
Music Awards Japan	2025	Best of Listeners' Choice: Japanese Song	"Woke Up"	Nominated	

== Concert tours ==
=== The First Howl World Tour ===
List of concert dates
Date	City	Country	Venue	Attendance
May 18, 2024	Osaka	Japan	Osaka-jō Hall	55,000
May 19, 2024	Osaka	Japan	Osaka-jō Hall	55,000
May 25, 2024	Yokohama	Japan	K-Arena Yokohama	55,000
May 26, 2024	Yokohama	Japan	K-Arena Yokohama	55,000
July 11, 2024	Seoul	South Korea	Yes24 Live Hall	65,000
July 13, 2024	Taipei	Taiwan	Taipei International Convention Center	65,000
July 16, 2024	Singapore		The Star Theatre	65,000
August 2, 2024	Manila	Philippines	Araneta Coliseum	65,000
August 4, 2024	Bangkok	Thailand	UOB Live	65,000
August 7, 2024	Kuala Lumpur	Malaysia	Mega Star Arena	65,000
August 13, 2024	Hong Kong	China	AsiaWorld–Expo Hall 10	65,000
August 20, 2024	Shanghai	China	Mercedes-Benz Arena	65,000
August 22, 2024	Chengdu	China	Dong'an Lake Sports Park Gymnasium	65,000
August 24, 2024	Beijing	China	National Indoor Stadium	65,000
October 4, 2024	Las Vegas	United States	The Theater at Virgin Hotels	50,000
October 6, 2024	Los Angeles	United States	Peacock Theater	50,000
October 8, 2024	San Francisco	United States	Bill Graham Civic Auditorium	50,000
October 9, 2024	San Francisco	United States	Bill Graham Civic Auditorium	50,000
October 12, 2024	Grand Prairie	United States	Texas Trust CU Theatre	50,000
October 14, 2024	Sugar Land	United States	Smart Financial Centre	50,000
October 16, 2024	Atlanta	United States	Gas South Arena	50,000
October 18, 2024	New York City	United States	Theater at Madison Square Garden	50,000
October 21, 2024	Chicago	United States	Wintrust Arena	50,000
November 18, 2024	Manchester	England	Victoria Warehouse	—
November 19, 2024	London	England	OVO Arena Wembley	—
November 22, 2024	Berlin	Germany	Uber Eats Music Hall	—
November 24, 2024	Paris	France	Le Zénith	—
November 26, 2024	Düsseldorf	Germany	Mitsubishi Electric Halle	—
November 27, 2024	Brussels	Belgium	Forest National	—
November 29, 2024	Amsterdam	Netherlands	AFAS Live	—
February 8, 2025	Nagoya	Japan	Port Messe Nagoya Exhibition Hall 1	—
February 9, 2025	Nagoya	Japan	Port Messe Nagoya Exhibition Hall 1	—
February 14, 2025	Sydney	Australia	ICC Sydney Theatre	—
February 16, 2025	Melbourne	Australia	Margaret Court Arena	—
February 22, 2025	Tokyo	Japan	Ariake Arena	30,000
February 23, 2025	Tokyo	Japan	Ariake Arena	30,000
March 8, 2025	Fukuoka	Japan	West Japan General Exhibition Center Annex	—
March 9, 2025	Fukuoka	Japan	West Japan General Exhibition Center Annex	—
March 15, 2025	Osaka	Japan	Osaka-jō Hall	—
March 16, 2025	Osaka	Japan	Osaka-jō Hall	—
March 21, 2025	Hangzhou	China	Hangzhou Olympic Sports Centre Gymnasium	—
March 23, 2025	Shanghai	China	Mercedes-Benz Arena	—
March 26, 2025	Beijing	China	Wukesong Arena	—
March 28, 2025	Chengdu	China	Dong'an Lake Sports Park Gymnasium	—
April 17, 2025	Seattle	United States	WaMu Theater	—
April 24, 2025	São Paulo	Brazil	Tokio Marine Hall	—
April 27, 2025	Mexico City	Mexico	Arena CDMX	—
May 14, 2025	Tokyo	Japan	Tokyo Dome	50,000
Total				N/A

=== The Core World Tour ===
List of concert dates
Date	City	Country	Venue	Attendance
February 6, 2026	Yokohama	Japan	K-Arena Yokohama	—
February 7, 2026	Yokohama	Japan	K-Arena Yokohama	—
February 8, 2026	Yokohama	Japan	K-Arena Yokohama	—
February 17, 2026	Osaka	Japan	Osaka-jō Hall	—
February 18, 2026	Osaka	Japan	Osaka-jō Hall	—
February 21, 2026	Nagoya	Japan	IG Arena	—
February 22, 2026	Nagoya	Japan	IG Arena	—
March 14, 2026	Fukui	Japan	Sun Dome Fukui	—
March 20, 2026	Sendai	Japan	Sekisui Heim Super Arena	—
March 25, 2026	Kobe	Japan	Glion Arena Kobe	—
March 26, 2026	Kobe	Japan	Glion Arena Kobe	—
April 4, 2026	Fukuoka	Japan	Kitakyushu Messe	—
April 5, 2026	Fukuoka	Japan	Kitakyushu Messe	—
April 10, 2026	Tokyo	Japan	Yoyogi National Gymnasium	—
April 11, 2026	Tokyo	Japan	Yoyogi National Gymnasium	—
April 12, 2026	Tokyo	Japan	Yoyogi National Gymnasium	—
July 19, 2026	Bangkok	Thailand	Impact Arena	—
July 22, 2026	Manila	Philippines	SM Mall of Asia Arena	—
August 2, 2026	Hong Kong	China	AsiaWorld-Expo	—
September 2, 2026	London	England	OVO Arena Wembley	—
September 5, 2026	Paris	France	Adidas Arena	—
October 12, 2026	Melbourne	Australia	Rod Laver Arena	—
October 14, 2026	Sydney	Australia	Qudos Bank Arena	—
October 17, 2026	Taipei	Taiwan	Taipei Arena	—
November 3, 2026	Oakland	United States	Oakland Arena	—
November 5, 2026	Los Angeles	United States	Crypto.com Arena	—
November 9, 2026	Chicago	United States	United Center	—
November 12, 2026	Hamilton	Canada	TD Coliseum	—
November 14, 2026	Newark	United States	Prudential Center	—
February 10, 2027	Tokyo	Japan	Tokyo Dome	—
February 11, 2027	Tokyo	Japan	Tokyo Dome	—
February 27, 2027	Osaka	Japan	Kyocera Dome Osaka	—
February 28, 2027	Osaka	Japan	Kyocera Dome Osaka	—
Total				N/A

List of cancelled concerts, showing date, city, country, venue and reason for cancellation
Date	City	Country	Venue	Reason
November 17, 2026	Dallas	United States	American Airlines Center	Unforeseen circumstances
November 22, 2026	Mexico City	Mexico	Arena CDMX	Unforeseen circumstances
