= Cocona (rapper) =

Japanese rapper and singer (born 2005)

- ココナ
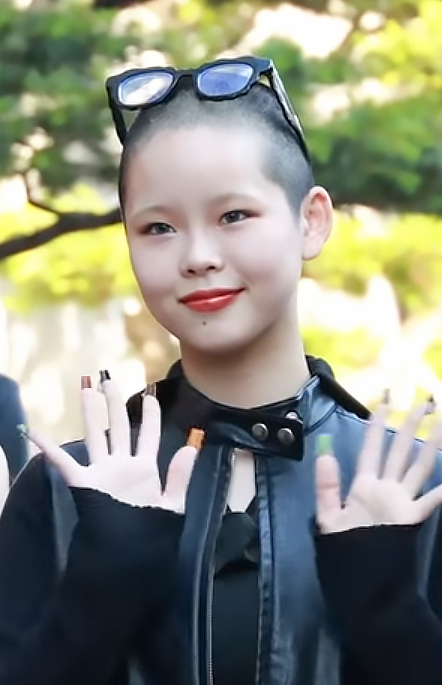
- Cocona in 2024
- Born: Kokona Akiyama; December 6, 2005 (age 20); Tokyo, Japan
- Occupations: Rapper; singer
- Years active: 2022–present
- Musical career
- Genres: Hip hop; R&B
- Instrument: Vocals
- Label: Xgalx
- Member of: XG

Japanese name
- Kanji: 秋山 心響
- Revised Hepburn: Akiyama Kokona

Kokona Akiyama (秋山 心響, Akiyama Kokona; born December 6, 2005), known professionally as Cocona (ココナ), is a Japanese rapper and singer. They (Note: Cocona uses they/them and he/him pronouns. This article uses they/them for consistency.) are a member of the Japanese vocal group XG, debuting with them in 2022. They publicly came out as transmasculine and non-binary on their 20th birthday in 2025.

== Early life ==
Kokona Akiyama was born on December 6, 2005 in Tokyo, Japan. They began singing at age nine, and felt that their deeper tone was appealing, so their vocal teacher then recommended rapping. When they were in elementary school, they took part in the entertainment contest Kirachare 2017, sponsored by Avex Inc., where they won a special prize in the vocal category. They also started taking lessons at Avex Artist Academy while in elementary school.

== Career ==
In 2017, Cocona passed the audition for the XG Project, led by Simon Jakops, and trained under Xgalx. They said their trainee period was "filled with new and hopeful moments" that taught them about music, personal growth, teamwork, and community. They debuted with XG on March 18, 2022, being the youngest member of the group at age 16. In November 2022, Cocona was featured in the performance of "Galz Xypher" which went viral for their trilingual rapping over instrumentals from songs by JID and Rosalía.

In 2023, Cocona and Maya co-wrote "Show You Can" for Street Woman Fighter 2, their first major songwriting credit. The song was performed live for the first time during XG's The First Howl World Tour finale at Tokyo Dome in 2025. In February 2026, Cocona was named a brand ambassador for Gucci and appeared on the cover of Elle Japan for its April issue, modeling Gucci clothing from the La Famiglia collection. In the same month, they attended the fashion house's fall/winter collection show in Milan, Italy.

== Artistry ==
Cocona has said their role model is American singer Lauryn Hill. They have also named artists like Tyler, the Creator, and Keyshia Cole as favorites who inspire them. They have also named TLC, Billie Eilish, and Doja Cat as some of their biggest inspirations. They have also said that fashion, music videos, and the overall style of artists have inspired their musical style. Cocona is also a fan of the South Korean group BigBang, singing their song "Haru Haru" for Kirachare 2017.

== Personal life ==
Cocona has said that they're "drawn to unique patterns, distinct colors, and unconventional clothing styles, vintage fashion and visiting thrift stores."

=== Public image ===
In the music video for XG's 2024 song "Woke Up," Cocona shaved their head, later stating they "wanted to show that I want everyone in the world to see and love themselves for who they really are". Later, they told BuzzFeed they had many reasons for shaving their head and wanted to show those meanings in their future work.

On their 20th birthday, Cocona came out as transmasculine and non-binary in an Instagram post shared on XG’s official account, also stating they had top surgery earlier in the year and expressed gratitude to their XG bandmates, Simon Jakops, and their parents for their support. The announcement received international media coverage and widespread support from fans and the industry. After they came out, XG's initialism, originally Xtraordinary Girls, was reinterpreted as Xtraordinary Genes.

== Discography ==
=== Songwriting credits ===
Year	Title	Artist	Album	Ref.
2023	"Show You Can"	Maya and Cocona	Street Woman Fighter 2 OST	
