= Winter Without You (song) =

Single by XG
- Released: December 8, 2023
- Genre: R&B
- Length: 4:03
- Label: Xgalx
- Composers: David Park; Shintaro Yasuda
- Producer: JAKOPS

XG singles chronology
"Puppet Show" (2023)	"Winter Without You" (2023)	"Undefeated" (2024)

Music video
- "Winter Without You" on YouTube

"Winter Without You" is a song by Japanese vocal group XG. It was released on December 8, 2023.

== Background ==
On November 26, 2023, XG announced the song and teased an upcoming world tour.

== Music video ==
A music video was released on December 8, 2023. The members of XG appear wearing white outfits against snowy, mountainous backgrounds.

== Personnel ==
Credits adapted from Apple Music.

Musicians

- Cocona – vocals
- Juria – vocals
- Harvey – vocals
- Chisa – vocals
- Hinata – vocals
- Jurin – vocals
- Maya – vocals

Technical

- JAKOPS – producer, songwriter
- CHANCELLOR – arranger, songwriter
- Paulina "Pau" Cerrilla – songwriter
- Knave – songwriter
- Shintaro Yausda – composer, arranger
- David Park – composer, arranger

== Commercial performance ==
XG was invited to perform the song on The First Take. It was the group's second performance on the show, following their debut performance with the song "Shooting Star".

== Charts ==
Weekly chart performance for "Winter Without You"
Chart (2023)	Peak position
Japan (Japan Hot 100)	58
