= Bansanka =

Single by Tuki

from the album 15
- Released: September 29, 2023
- Genre: J-pop
- Length: 3:35
- Label: The Lunar Landing Plan
- Songwriter: Tuki
- Producer: Usagi

Tuki singles chronology
"Bansanka" (2023)	"Ichirinka" (2023)

Music video
- Bansanka on YouTube

"Bansanka" (晩餐歌; lit. 'supper song' or 'dinner song') is the debut single by Japanese singer-songwriter Tuki from her debut studio album 15 (2025). It was released independently through her label the Lunar Landing Plan on September 29, 2023. In January 2024, the song topped the Oricon Combined Singles Chart and Billboard Japan Hot 100.

== Background and release ==
Tuki began posting her cover and original songs on TikTok while in middle school. "Bansanka" was first uploaded onto TikTok on July 7, 2023. The acoustic version of the song was uploaded to YouTube on September 13, and the duet version with singer-songwriter Yuuri on November 6.

"Bansanka" was inspired after her father mentioned "There are about 30,000 days in a lifetime". Reflecting on that, she thought "I've already lived 5,000 days and only have about 25,000 more".

== Live performances ==
Tuki debuted the performance of "Bansanka" on Buzz Rhythm alongside "Inferno Love Letter" on April 20, 2024, and performed on the 75th NHK Kōhaku Uta Gassen on December 31.

== Covers ==
Ateez's Wooyoung covered of "Bansanka" on LeeMujin Service on June 23, 2026.

On June 29, 2026, South Korean singer Taeyeon released the Korean version of "Bansanka", as part of the J-Pop Remake project.

On August 29, 2026, South Korean singer Yoon Jeonghan from Seventeen, released a cover of the song.

== Accolades ==
Awards and nominations for "Bansanka"
Ceremony	Year	Award	Result	Ref.
Music Awards Japan	2025	Best Japanese Singer-Songwriter Song	Nominated	
Music Awards Japan	2025	Karaoke of the Year: J-Pop	Nominated	

== Charts ==
=== Weekly charts ===
Weekly chart performance for "Bansanka"
Chart (2024–2026)	Peak position
Global 200 (Billboard)	153
Japan (Japan Hot 100)	1
Japan Combined Singles (Oricon)	1
South Korea (Circle)	104

=== Monthly charts ===
Monthly chart performance for "Bansanka"
Chart (2026)	Position
South Korea (Circle)	115

=== Year-end charts ===
2024 year-end chart performance for "Bansanka"
Chart (2024)	Position
Global Excl. US (Billboard)	184
Japan (Japan Hot 100)	2
Japan Combined Singles (Oricon)	7

2025 year-end chart performance for "Bansanka"
Chart (2025)	Position
Japan (Japan Hot 100)	20

== Taeyeon version ==
"Bansanka"

Single by Taeyeon

from the album J-Pop Remake Vol. 1
- Released: June 29, 2026
- Recorded: 2026
- Studio: 821 Sound; KLANG Studio
- Genre: Pop
- Length: 3:39
- Label: SHgold Networks; Kakao
- Lyricist: Lee Seu-ran
- Producers: Tuki; Choi Young-ho (Handsome People)

Taeyeon singles chronology
"Panorama" (2025)	"Bansanka" (2026)	"Unspecial" (2026)

Music video
- "Bansanka" on YouTube

"Bansanka" (Korean: 만찬가; RR: Manchanga; lit. 'Banquet Hymn') was re-recorded as a Korean version by South Korean singer Taeyeon and was released by SHgold Networks on June 29, 2026, as the inaugural release of South Korean-Japanese musician Kangnam's project "J-Pop Remake".

=== Background and release ===
On June 24, 2026, SHgold Networks announced that Taeyeon would be releasing a Korean remake version of "Bansanka", slated for release on June 29, 2026. On the same day, the music video teaser for "Bansanka" was released, it stars girl group Rescene's members Woni and Minami. In the music video, Minami portrayed a girl who carries emotional scars and isolates herself from others, while Woni played a character who takes the first step toward reaching out to her. The song and the music video were officially released on June 29.

=== Track listing ===
Digital download / streaming

1. "Bansanka" – 3:39
2. "Bansanka" (instrumental) – 3:39

=== Credits and personnel ===
Credits adapted from Melon.

Studio

- 821 Sound – recording, mastering
- KLANG Studio – mixing

Personnel

- Taeyeon – vocals, background vocals
- Lee Seu-ran – lyrics
- Tuki – composition
- Choi Young-ho (Handsome People) – music producer, arrangement, string arrangement, guitar, piano, MIDI
- IRIS - vocal directing, chorus
- Kim Min-hee – recording
- Gu Jong-pil – mixing
- Jang Jae-won – guitar
- Kwon Nam-woo – mastering
- Yung String - string

=== Charts ===
Weekly chart performance for "Bansanka (Taeyeon version)"
Chart (2026)	Peak position
LyricFind Global (Billboard)	2
South Korea (Billboard Korea Global K-Songs)	54
South Korea (Circle)	10

Monthly chart performance for "Bansanka (Taeyeon version)"
Chart (2026)	Peak position
South Korea (Circle)	9

=== Release history ===
Release dates and formats for "Bansanka (Taeyeon version)"
Region	Date	Format(s)	Label(s)	Ref.
Various	June 29, 2026	Digital download; streaming	SM; Dreamus	
