= Kocchi no Kento =

Japanese singer-songwriter and internet personality (born 1996)

- こっちのけんと
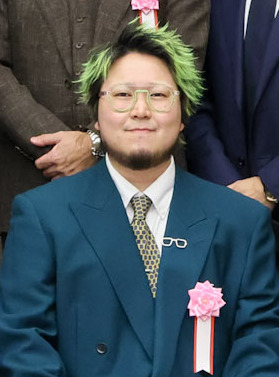
- Kocchi no Kento in 2025
- Born: Kento Sugō; June 13, 1996 (age 30); Minoh, Osaka, Japan
- Education: Komazawa University
- Occupations: Singer-songwriter; internet personality
- Years active: 2019–present
- Spouse: Unknown (m. 2024)
- Children: 1
- Relatives: Masaki Suda (elder brother); Nana Komatsu (sister-in-law)

YouTube information
- Channel: @SuppokoPeppoko
- Years active: 2019–present
- Genre: Music
- Subscribers: 1 million
- Views: 697 million
- Musical career
- Genre: J-pop
- Instrument: Vocals
- Labels: Blowout Inc.; Ki/oon
- Last updated: March 18, 2026
- Website: blowout.co.jp/works/122/

Kento Sugō (Japanese: 菅生 健人, Hepburn: Sugō Kento; born June 13, 1996), known professionally as Kocchi no Kento (こっちのけんと, Kotchi no Kento; lit. 'This Kento'), is a Japanese singer-songwriter and internet personality. He began covering songs a cappella in 2019 and is best known for his 2024 single "Hai Yorokonde".

== Early life ==
Kento Sugō was born in Minoh, Osaka Prefecture, Japan on June 13, 1996. His father is Arata Sugō, a management consultant, journalist, author and television personality, who inspired Sugō to pursue music. He has two siblings: his elder brother is the actor and singer Masaki Suda, and his younger brother is the actor and model Araki Sugō.

Sugō attended Komazawa University, where he formed an a cappella group, Chemical Quartet, with members from the university's a cappella club Meiseishishin. He won the national amateur a cappella contest, A Cappella Spirits, for two consecutive years.

== Career ==
Sugō began his YouTube career by covering the a cappella version of several songs in 2019. He uses the stage name "Kocchi no Kento", meaning "this Kento". It symbolizes the feeling when he sings, which is himself more than being a salaryman after graduating, like the "other Kento". He appeared as a backing vocal for the performances of Radwimps and Tōko Miura's "Grand Escape" at the 70th NHK Kōhaku Uta Gassen in 2019, and Miisha Shimizu at New Disney Plus Celebration Night.

He started writing his own songs in 2022, and released his debut single "Tiny" through Blowout Inc. on August 30 the same year. The song is about the relationship among his brothers. His following single "Shinuna!", went moderately viral on TikTok in mid-2023, and peaked at number nine on the Billboard Japan Heatseekers Songs.

The singer's 2024 single "Hai Yorokonde" depicts the daily lives of salarymen whose stress has peaked while struggling to overcome peer pressure. Its cover artwork and music video are inspired by Shōwa-era manga and anime. The song became his most successful song to date after becoming viral on social media, peaking at number four on the Billboard Japan Hot 100 and seven on the Oricon Combined Singles Chart. Following this success, he won Best New Artist at the 66th Japan Record Awards and appeared as a main artist for the first time to perform "Hai Yorokonde" at the 75th NHK Kōhaku Uta Gassen on December 31.

On January 1, 2025, the singer announced via X for his intention to "take a break for the time being," and resumed his activity in March. Months later, Kocchi no Kento performed "Kekka Ōrai", an opening theme for anime series My Hero Academia: Vigilantes, which released digitally on April 7 and came on CD as an EP on June 18. He was in charge of the theme for drama series Chotto Dake Esper, titled "Watakushigoto".

== Personal life ==
Kocchi no Kento quit his company job in 2020 and, thereafter, was diagnosed with bipolar disorder, which was revealed later in September 2023.

He married an unnamed spouse on February 14, 2024. He announced the birth of their child on March 18, 2026.

== Discography ==
=== Extended plays ===
List of extended plays, showing selected details
| Title | Details | Peaks | Sales |
| Title | Details | JPN | Sales |
|---|---|---|---|
| Kekka Ōrai EP | Released: June 18, 2025; Label: Blowout Inc., Ki/oon; Formats: CD, DL, streaming; Track listing: 1. "Kekka Ōrai"; 2. "Sore mo Ii ne" 3. "Hai Yorokonde" (from The First Take); 4. "Kekka Ōrai" (English version); 5. "Kekka Ōrai" (anime version); 6. "Kekka Ōrai" (instrumental) | 25 | JPN: 1,576 |

=== Live albums ===
List of live albums, showing selected details, chart positions and sales
| Title | Details |
|---|---|
| Kocchi no Kento One-Man Live "Ippo Niho" | Released: August 11, 2026; Label: Blowout Inc.; Formats: DL, streaming |

=== Singles ===
==== As lead artist ====
List of singles as lead artist, showing year released, selected chart positions, and album name
| Title | Year | Peaks | | | Album |
| Title | Year | JPN Cmb. | JPN Hot | WW Excl. US | Album |
|---|---|---|---|---|---|
| "Tiny" | 2022 | — | — | — | Non-album singles |
| "Shinuna!" | 2022 | — | — (Note: "Shinuna!" did not enter the Billboard Japan Hot 100, but peaked at number nine on the Heatseekers Songs.) | — | Non-album singles |
| "Viva Peek-a-Boo" | 2023 | — | — | — | Non-album singles |
| "Donguri Game" | 2023 | — | — | — | Non-album singles |
| "Iroha" | 2023 | — | — | — | Non-album singles |
| "Hai Yorokonde" | 2024 | 7 | 4 | 99 | Non-album singles |
| "Mō Ii yo" | 2024 | — | 81 | — | Non-album singles |
| "Time Lapse" (featuring Yella.E) | 2025 | — | — | — | Non-album singles |
| "Kekka Ōrai" | 2025 | — (Note: "Kekka Ōrai" did not enter the Oricon Combined Singles Chart, but peaked at number 21 on the Digital Singles Chart.) | 77 | — | Kekka Ōrai EP |
| "Sore mo Ii ne" (with Wakeys) | 2025 | — | — | — | Kekka Ōrai EP |
| "Gokurosan" | 2025 | — | — | — | Non-album singles |
| "Watakushigoto" | 2025 | — | — | — | Non-album singles |
| "Pickles" | 2025 | — | — | — | Non-album singles |
| "Goron to Doron" | 2026 | — | — | — | Non-album singles |
| "Dada" | 2026 | — | — | — | Non-album singles |
| "Kotonoha" (with So-So) | 2026 | — | — | — | Non-album singles |
"—" denotes releases that did not chart or were not released in that region.

==== As featured artist ====
List of singles as featured artist, showing year released and album name
| Title | Year | Album |
|---|---|---|
| "Tomopan" (Shit Kingz featuring Kocchi no Kento) | 2026 | Non-album singles |
| "AI Saved the Perfect Star" (Meiyo featuring Kocchi no Kento) | 2026 | Non-album singles |

=== Guest appearances ===
List of non-single guest appearances, showing year released, other performing artists, and album name
| Title | Year | Other artist(s) | Album |
|---|---|---|---|
| "Hurricane" | 2025 | Masayuki Suzuki | All Time Doo Wop |

== Concerts ==
- Yoitokose (2024)

== Filmography ==
=== Films ===
| Title | Year | Role | Note | Ref. |
|---|---|---|---|---|
| Moana 2 | 2024 | Island resident | Japanese dub voice | |
| Zootopia 2 | 2025 | Kent Tanuki | Japanese dub voice | |

=== Radio shows ===
| Title | Year | Role | Ref. |
|---|---|---|---|
| Sugō Kento no Doboku o Shiru | 2023 | Host | |
| The Moment | 2024–present | Host | |

=== Web shows ===
| Title | Year | Role | Ref. |
|---|---|---|---|
| Sugō Kento no Doboku o Shiru | 2020–2023 | Host | |

== Awards and nominations ==
Name of the award ceremony, year presented, award category, nominee(s) of the award, and the result of the nomination
| Award ceremony | Year | Category | Nominee(s)/work(s) | Result | Ref. |
|---|---|---|---|---|---|
| Japan Record Awards | 2024 | Best New Artist | Kocchi no Kento | Won | |
| MTV Video Music Awards Japan | 2025 | Future Icons Award | Kocchi no Kento | Won | |
| MTV Video Music Awards Japan | 2025 | Best Animation Video | "Hai Yorokonde" | Won | |
| MTV Video Music Awards Japan | 2025 | Video of the Year | "Hai Yorokonde" | Nominated | |
| Music Awards Japan | 2025 | Best Music Video | "Hai Yorokonde" | Nominated | |
| Music Awards Japan | 2025 | Best Viral Song | "Hai Yorokonde" | Nominated | |
| Music Awards Japan | 2025 | Best New Artist | Kocchi no Kento | Nominated | |
| U-Can New Words and Buzzword Awards | 2024 | New Words and Buzzwords Awards | "Hai Yorokonde" | Nominated | |
