= Hypnotize (XG song) =

Single by XG

from the album The Core
- Released: January 23, 2026
- Genre: House; dance-pop
- Length: 2:51
- Label: Xgalx
- Lyricists: Jakops; Chancellor; Justin Kwon; Lukas Costas; Rence; Alex Schwoebel; Allegra Miles; Xansei
- Producers: Jakops; Chancellor

XG singles chronology
| "4 Seasons" (2025) | "Hypnotize" (2026) |

Music video
- "Hypnotize" on YouTube

"Hypnotize" is a song by Japanese vocal group XG. Released on January 23, 2026, through Xgalx, it serves as the third single from the group's debut studio album, The Core - 核 (2026). A music video directed by Kim In Tae was released on January 23, 2026, simultaneously with the single and parent album's release.

== Background and composition ==
We really wanted to pull the audience into XG’s world through the atmosphere we create, and the bass has a techno-house sound that also includes piano. But in the end, I think it’s really about showing XG’s confidence and the way we hypnotise the audience. There are lyrics that talk about how we carve through time and how a single gaze can pull you in, but once listeners are in our world, they almost let their bodies flow and give themselves up to the music. That's what "Hypnotize" is meant to do.

— Chisa on "Hypnotize"

The song was revealed as part of the track list to The Core on December 23, 2025.

Upon release, press statements from XGALX, described the song to "transcend mere seduction", showcasing the intense confidence and energy XG brings.

"Hypnotize" is two minutes and 51 seconds. Musically, the song is an uptempo "runway-ready" house and dance-pop track with influences of UK garage and diva house. Featuring "dreamy" production and rhythmic piano slabs, the chorus is led by main vocalist Chisa, whose adlibs are heard throughout the chorus. The song further expands the dance and house sound that XG leans into through The Core, as well as the themes of seduction and hypnotism.'

Lyrically, the song features the members of XG singing about attracting and pulling the listener into a state of hypnosis. Throughout the song, there are many references to hypnosis, with phrases like "Every little spell I cast, don't miss" and word choices like "escape", "gaze", and "tick-tock" being used to convey the message.

== Music video ==
The music video for "Hypnotize" is directed by Kim In Tae. It was released on January 23, 2026 alongside the parent album's release. Serving as the main visual for the album, the video expands on the hypnotic and enthralling themes of the track's lyrics, placing the members in deep-sea settings with aquatic and space imagery. In the video there are many swirling visuals, images of spirals, and allusions to sleep and dreams to convey the feeling of being hypnotized.

The chorus features the members of XG doing a high energy choreographed number choreographed by Blake John Wood.

== Critical reception ==
Christine Terrisse of the Los Angeles Times mentioned that the song expands on one of XG's signature sounds while bringing into a "dreamy element".

Tássia Assis from NME called the song a "runway-ready" single that conveys who they are in a more mature way.

Rafael Bautista of Mega Magazine praised the song, describing the song to put a spell on the listener with its production.

Writers at Bandwagon Asia called the track a standout that serves as the parent album's centerpiece and "floats between reality and the subconscious".

In a review of the parent album, Neil Z. Yeung of AllMusic highlighted the song, calling it a "blissful club moment".

== Charts ==
Chart performance
| Chart (2026) | Peak position |
|---|---|
| Japan (Japan Hot 100) | 18 |
| New Zealand (Recorded Music NZ) | 7 |
