= Grl Gvng =

2023 single by XG

Single by XG

from the EP New DNA
- Released: June 30, 2023
- Length: 3:08
- Label: Xgalx
- Songwriters: JAKOPS; Rachel West; Dayday
- Composers: JAKOPS; Lantz; Rachel West
- Producer: Lantz

XG singles chronology
"Shooting Star" (2023)	"Grl Gvng" (2023)	"TGIF" (2023)

"Grl Gvng" is a 2023 single by Japanese vocal group XG. Released on June 30 as a pre-release single to New DNA, it debuted at number one on Billboard's Hot Trending charts.

== Composition ==
XG's lead producer, Simon Jakops, stated that the song was about how the girl group "will not compare itself with anyone else, not compromise with anyone else and reach the top in our style."

== Critical reception ==
Ranker placed "Grl Gvng" at fourth in a list of the best XG songs, stating that it's "a fierce and empowering track that features bold beats, confident lyrics, and an addictive hook that exudes girl power" and that "The song's high-energy production and dynamic composition highlight the group's strong vocal and rap talents."
