= Is This Love (XG song) =

Single by XG

from the EP Awe
- Released: March 7, 2025
- Length: 2:35
- Label: Xgalx
- Composers: Bastian "B" Testori; Bluebird; Chancellor; Jakops; Scootie; Tayor; Tild Tomorrow
- Lyricists: Bastian "B" Testori; Bianca "Blush" Atterberry; Bluebird; Chancellor; Jakops; Knave; Mychole "Starr" Anderson; Scootie; Tayor; Tild Tomorrow

XG singles chronology
"Howling" (2024)	"Is This Love" (2025)	"In the Rain" (2025)

Music video
- "Is This Love" on YouTube

"Is This Love" is a song by Japanese vocal group XG. It was originally released as the eighth and final track on XG's second EP, Awe, on November 8, 2024. It was later re-released as a digital single on March 7, 2025, as the global campaign song for Shiseido's Anessa brand.

== Remixes ==
In 2025, XG was announced as the brand muse for Anessa, a sun care brand under Shiseido. On February 28, 2025, XG appeared in two commercials for Anessa which used "Is This Love" as its background track. The group also appeared in a minute-long video titled "The people who shine are the people who have fun." On March 7, the vocal group re-released "Is This Love" with several new remixes and versions.

== Track listing ==
All lyrics are written by Bastian "B" Testori, Bianca "Blush" Atterberry, Bluebird, Chancellor, Jakpos, Knave, Mychole "Starr" Anderson, Scootie, Tayor, and Tild Tomorrow.

"Is This Love" track listing
No.	Title	Music	Length
1.	"Is This Love"	Testori; Bluebird; Chancellor; Jakops; Scootie; Tayor; Tild Tomorrow	2:35
2.	"Is This Love" (piano version)	Chancellor; Docskim; Jakops	2:36
3.	"Is This Love" (instrumental)	Testori; Bluebird; Chancellor; Jakops; Scootie; Tayor; Tild Tomorrow	2:35
4.	"Is This Love" (piano version instrumental)	Chancellor; Docskim; Jakops	2:36
Total length:			10:23

== Charts ==
=== Weekly charts ===
Weekly chart performance for "Is This Love"
Chart (2025)	Peak position
Japan (Japan Hot 100)	24
Japan Combined Singles (Oricon)	33

=== Year-end charts ===
Year-end chart performance for "Is This Love"
Chart (2025)	Position
Japan (Japan Hot 100)	97

== Certifications ==
Certifications for "Is This Love"
Region	Certification	Certified units/sales
Japan (RIAJ)	Gold	50,000,000^{†}
^{†} Streaming-only figures based on certification alone.
