= Gala (song) =

Single by XG

from the album The Core
- Released: September 19, 2025
- Genre: House
- Length: 3:47
- Label: Xgalx
- Composers: Jakops; Chancellor; Doomsday
- Lyricists: Jakops; Chancellor; Seunghoo; Lyricks; Paulina Cerrilla
- Producer: Jakops

XG singles chronology
"Million Places" (2025)	"Gala" (2025)	"4 Seasons" (2025)

Music video
- "Gala" on YouTube

"Gala" is a song by Japanese vocal group XG. Released on September 19, 2025, through Xgalx, it is the lead single from the group's debut studio album, The Core (2026).

== Background ==
According to XG member Maya, the self-described "runway anthem" was directly inspired by the Met Gala, which influenced not just the song but also the choreography and fashion shown in its music video. Harvey stated, "We've challenged ourselves to try many different dances and a new sense of fashion that we haven’t done before to become bolder."

The song's logo was designed by Hajime Sorayama.

== Composition ==
"Gala" is described as a futuristic "high-octane, runway-ready" house track with influences of rap and heavy usage of bold synthesizers.

== Critical reception ==
The Hollywood Reporter stated that "The song is fun and experimental, but it still manages to feel right at home in the group’s eclectic discography."

Clash called the song "a high-energy fusion of futuristic production and avant-garde visuals." and "the essence of what XG calls 'X-Pop'—a genre built on self-expression, precision, and fearless creativity."

== Track listing ==
- Digital download and streaming
1. "Gala" – 3:47
2. "Gala" (instrumental) – 3:47

== Charts ==
Chart performance
Chart (2025)	Peak position
Japan (Japan Hot 100)	11
Japan Combined Singles (Oricon)	34

== Listicles ==
Name of publisher, year listed, name of listicle, and placement
Publisher	Year	Listicle	Placement	Ref.
Bandwagon Asia	2025	Bandwagon's Top 10 Music Videos of 2025	Placed	
