= Left Right (song) =

Song by XG
- A-side: "Shooting Star"
- Released: January 25, 2023
- Label: Xgalx
- Songwriters: Chancellor; JAKOPS; Knave; Purple
- Producers: Chancellor; JAKOPS

Music video
- "Left Right" on YouTube

"Left Right" is a song by Japanese vocal group XG. It was released on January 25, 2023, as a B-side of the single "Shooting Star", by Xgalx. A music video for "Left Right" was released on February 13.

== Composition ==
The song combines elements of 2000s hip-hop and R&B; Grungecake compared its sound to that of 3LW, Blaque, and TLC. Billboard described it as "bubbly, Y2K-leaning pop and R&B."

== Remix ==
On April 16, 2023, during Coachella 2023, Hong Kong rapper Jackson Wang invited American singer-songwriter Ciara on stage during his set in order to perform several songs, including a remix of "Left Right." The remix was officially released on May 4.

== Critical reception ==
On February 13, 2023, Billboard listed the song in its weekly round-up of "stellar pop tunes."

== Charts ==
Chart performance for "Left Right"
Chart (2023)	Peak position
Global Japan Exl. Japan (Billboard Japan)	12
Singapore Regional (RIAS)	22
US Pop Airplay (Billboard)	27
