= 75th NHK Kōhaku Uta Gassen =

- Also known as: 75th NHK Red & White Year-End Song Festival
- Genre: Music; variety; special
- Created by: Tsumoru Kondo
- Presented by: Hiroiki Ariyoshi; Kanna Hashimoto; Sairi Ito; Naoko Suzuki
- Judges: Gosho Aoyama; Teruyoshi Uchimura; Yui Kamiji; Yumi Kawai; Yuto Horigome; Yoko Morishita; Ryusei Yokohama; Erika Yoshida
- Theme music composer: Kazuo Zaitsu (Lyrics); Ryo Konishi (Arrangement)
- Opening theme: "Kitte no Nai Okurimono" by Kouhaku Performers
- Ending theme: "Hotaru no Hikari"
- Composers: Takahiro Kaneko (arrangement); Tsunaki Mihara (arrangement); Ludwig van Beethoven (incidental music)
- Country of origin: Japan
- Original language: Japanese

Production
- Production locations: NHK Hall, Tokyo
- Running time: 260 minutes
- Production company: NHK Enterprise Inc.

Original release
- Network: NHK-G; NHK World Premium (outside Japan); Jme (USA & Canada only); NHK Radio 1
- Release: December 31, 2024

The 75th NHK Kōhaku Uta Gassen (第75回NHK紅白歌合戦, Dai Nanajūgo Kai Enu Eichi Kei Kōhaku Uta Gassen) was the Reiwa 6 edition of NHK's New Year's Eve TV special Kōhaku Uta Gassen, held on December 31, 2024. The show was broadcast live from NHK Hall. The White Team won this contest.

== Events leading up the broadcast ==
On September 18, NHK released the broadcast times. The show starts at 19:20, and wrap up at 23:45 (JST), with a 5-minute break for the latest news. On October 11, NHK announced the hosts, who would be Hiroiki Ariyoshi, Kanna Hashimoto, Sairi Ito, and Naoko Suzuki. Additionally, this year's theme was stated to be "Songs for You".

The show was broadcast globally on NHK World Premium, with the exception of both the US and Canada, which the event exclusively streamed on newly launched Jme, replacing TV Japan following the closure on March 31, 2024. Viewers and listeners within Japan could watch and hear the event on NHK-G and NHK Radio 1 respectively.

In honor of the Jeju Air Flight 2216 crash, which had occurred two days earlier, members of the South Korean groups Tomorrow X Together, Twice, Illit, and Le Sserafim wore black ribbons on their outfits to pay tribute to the victims.

== Artist lineup and performance order ==
On November 19, the list of performers was revealed. For the second year in a row, no artists belonging to Starto Entertainment and Smile Up, Inc. (formerly Johnny & Associates) were scheduled to appear on this edition of the Kōhaku Uta Gassen. The absence of talent from the agency is a consequence of the juvenile sex abuse scandals from Johnny Kitagawa, revealed on November 13, 2023.

On December 13, Kana Nishino was added to artist lineup. On December 19, Kōji Tamaki joined the lineup to perform his song "Kanashimi ni Sayonara", to celebrate the 10th anniversary of his symphonic national tour. On December 20, Kenshi Yonezu is added to the lineup.

On December 23, the full song list has been revealed. On December 26, NHK announced that changed Gen Hoshino's song performance from "Why Don't You Play in Hell?" to "Barabara". In the same day, the performance order is revealed, with Me:I opening the show, and Misia serving once again as Ootori.

Key
†	Debuting artists
‡	Artists returning after absence

List of 75th NHK Kōhaku Uta Gassen performers and songs (opening half, 19:20–20:55)
No.	Team	Artist (no. of appearances)	Song
—N/a		All performers	Opening — "Kitte no Nai Okuri-mono"
1	Red	Me:I (1) †	"Click"
2	Red	Yoshimi Tendo (29)	"Anta no Hanamichi"
3	White	Kocchi no Kento (1) †	"Hai Yorokonde"
4	White	Omoinotake (1) †	"Ikuokukonen"
5	White	Da-ice (1) †	"I Wonder"
6	Red	Illit (1) †	"Magnetic"
7	Red	Ryokuoushoku Shakai (3)	"Bokura wa Iki Mono Dakara"
—N/a	Special	Illit, (Note: Illit is represented by members Iroha and Moka.) Number i, Me:I (Note: Me:I is represented by members Keiko and Shizuku.)	"Computer Obā-chan"
—N/a	Special	Hiroiki Ariyoshi, Kanna Hashimoto, Sairi Ito	"Dango 3 Kyodai"
—N/a	Special	Misia	"Beautiful Name"
—N/a	Special	Hiroiki Ariyoshi, Kanna Hashimoto, Sairi Ito, Yūichirō Hanada, Maya Nagata, Azuki Akimoto, Kazumu Sakumoto, characters from Okaasan to Issho	"Karada Dan Dan"
—N/a	Special	All performers	"Paprika"
8	White	Leon Niihama (1) †	"Subete o Ageyō"
9	Red	Sakurazaka46 (8) (Note: Including four appearances under the name Keyakizaka46, which the group used from 2015–2020)	"Jigōjitoku"
10	White	JO1 (3)	"Love Seeker"
11	White	Keisuke Yamauchi (10)	"Kurenai no Chō"
12	Red	HY (3) ‡	"366 Days"
13	Red	Nogizaka46 (10)	"Kikkake"
14	White	Junretsu (7)	"Yume Mita Kajitsu"
15	Red	Le Sserafim (3) (Note: Member Sakura Miyawaki has further participated once as a member of HKT48 and thrice as a member of AKB48.)	"Crazy" (Japanese Version)
16	Red	Tuki (1) †	"Bansanka"
17	White	Be:First (3)	"Masterplan"
18	White	Tomorrow X Together (1) †	"Blue Hour" (Japanese Version)
19	Red	Kaori Mizumori (22)	"Tottori Sakyū" (Kōhaku Domino Challenge Special)
20	Red	Aiko (15) ‡	"Mutual Love"
21	White	Hiromi Go (37)	"240,000,000 no Hitomi" (Go! Go! Special)

List of 75th NHK Kōhaku Uta Gassen performers and songs (ending half, 21:00–23:45)
No.	Team	Artist (no. of appearances)	Song
22	White	Creepy Nuts (1) †	"Bling-Bang-Bang-Born"
—N/a	Special (Note: Disney music medley)	Da-ice, Me:I (Note: Me:I is represented by members Momona Kasahara, Ran Ishii, Cocoro Kato, Miu Sakurai, and Suzu Yamamoto.)	"You Can Fly!" (Note: Performance recorded in advance)
—N/a	Special	Nogizaka46	"Let It Go"
—N/a	Special	Motoki Ohmori, Sakura Miyawaki (Note: Ohmori and Miyawaki are members of the groups Mrs. Green Apple and Le Sserafim, respectively.)	"I See the Light"
—N/a	Special	All performers	"When You Wish Upon a Star"
23	White	Glay (4) ‡	"Yuuwaku"
24	Red	Fuyumi Sakamoto (36)	"Noto wa Iran Kai ne"
25	White	Vaundy (2) ‡	"Odoriko"
26	Red	Ringo Sheena (9) and Momo (1) † (Note: Sheena has further participated twice as a member of the band Tokyo Jihen. Momo, a member of Charan-Po-Rantan, makes her first appearance.)	"Cheers Beer"
27	White	Gen Hoshino (10)	"Barabara"
28	Red	Superfly (8)	"Beautiful"
29	Red	Twice (5) (Note: Members Momo Hirai, Sana, and Mina have previously participated once as members of MiSaMo.) ‡	"TT" and "Feel Special" (special medley)
30	White	Number i (1) †	"GOAT"
—N/a	Special	B'z (1) †	"Illumination" "Love Phantom" "Ultra Soul"
31	White	Fujii Kaze (3) ‡	"Michiteyuku"
32	White	Hiroshi Miyama (10)	"Koi... Jōnen"
33	Red	Aimyon (6)	"Wish I Could See You, But"
34	White	Kōsetsu Minami (6) (Note: Minami has further participated once as a member of Kaguyahime.) ‡	"Kandagawa"
35	Red	Iruka (2) ‡	"Nagoriyuki"
—N/a	Special (Note: Tribute to Toshiyuki Nishida)	Keiko Takeshita, Tetsuya Takeda, Ken Tanaka, Shigeru Matsuzaki	"Moshi mo Piano ga Hiketa nara"
36	Red	Kana Nishino (10) ‡	"Best Friend" and "Eyes on You" (Kōhaku special medley)
37	White	Mrs. Green Apple (2)	"Ao to Natsu" and "Lilac" (medley)
—N/a	Special	Kiyoshi Hikawa (24) ‡	"Hakuun no Shiro"
38	White	The Alfee (2) ‡	"Hoshizora no Distance"
39	Red	Mariko Takahashi (6) (Note: Takahashi has further participated once as a member of Pedro & Capricious.) ‡	"For You..."
—N/a	Special	Kenshi Yonezu (2) ‡	"Sayonara, Mata Itsuka!"
40	Red	Sayuri Ishikawa (47)	"Noto Hantō"
—N/a	Special	Kōji Tamaki (3) (Note: Tamaki has further participated twice as a member of Anzen Chitai.) ‡	"Kanashimi ni Sayonara"
41	White	Masaharu Fukuyama (17)	"Hitomi" and "Shōnen" (Special Medley)
42	Red	Misia (9)	Closer — "Kibō no Uta" and "Ashita e" (Kōhaku Special 2024)

== Guests ==
Judges

- Gosho Aoyama - manga artist, creator from Detective Conan
- Teruyoshi Uchimura - comedian, previously hosted 68th to 71st editions of Kouhaku Utagassen
- Yui Kamiji - paralympic athlete and wheelchair tennis player
- Yuumi Kawai - actress, will star in upcoming Asadora Anpan
- Yuto Horigome - skater, gold medal in 2024 Paris Olympic Games
- Yoko Morishita - ballerina
- Ryusei Yokohama - actor, will star in upcoming Taiga drama Unbound
- Erika Yoshida - showrunner, main writer from anime series Bocchi the Rock! and the Asadora The Tiger and Her Wings

Guest performances

- Cast of Okaasan to Issho
- Shunichi Tokura - choir conductor in Hotaru no Hikari
- Foorin - Guest musical act on "Paprika", one-time reunion performance
- Arco & Peace
- DJ Koo - Guest on Hiroshi Miyama's performance and attempt for Kendama world record
- Akiko Yano - piano in Misia's performance
