= New DNA =

- Digital cover

EP by XG
- Released: September 27, 2023
- Genres: Pop; hip-hop; R&B
- Length: 14:57
- Language: English
- Label: Xgalx

XG chronology
New DNA (2023)	Awe (2024)

Singles from New DNA
- 1. "Grl Gvng" Released: June 30, 2023; 2. "TGIF" Released: August 4, 2023; 3. "New Dance" Released: August 23, 2023; 4. "Puppet Show" Released: September 27, 2023

New DNA is the debut extended play (EP) by Japanese vocal group XG. It was released on September 27, 2023, via Xgalx, and marked the group's first album release since their debut in March 2022. Recorded in English, the EP utilizes hip-hop and R&B with musical styles such as UK drill and Jersey club. New DNA was supported by four singles: "Grl Gvng", "TGIF", "New Dance", and "Puppet Show". Commercially, it peaked at number one on the Billboard Japan Hot Albums and number two on the Oricon Albums Chart, and was certified gold by the Recording Industry Association of Japan (RIAJ) for shipments of over 100,000 copies.

== Background and release ==
In late July 2023, the release of XG's debut extended play was announced by their label Xgalx for September 27. The agency noted that the EP would come in two different versions: "X", which "focuses on XG's mysterious and sharp" image, and "G", which "shows a pure and refreshing side".

NME described the record as a "a menagerie of styles, influences and genres, coated with a cybernetic, bio-surreal sheen". Wonderland expressed that the EP "symbolizes an evolution of the seven as a group, both imagetically and sonically, bringing references of hip-hop/R&B to their music." The Korea Herald wrote that it "expand[s] on XG's sonic scape, weaving through multiple new genres the likes of UK Drill and Jersey Club to the group's essential hip-hop and R&B sound."

== Critical reception ==
Carmen Chin of NME gave the EP a rating of four out of five stars; in "X-Gene", she praised Jurin, Cocona and Harvey's verses as "exceptionally fluid", with "their voices and tones complementing each other as trap beats pulsate", and Chisa and Juria's "vocal prowess". She highlighted "TGIF" as a standout from the record.

== Track listing ==
New DNA track listing
No.	Title	Lyrics	Music	Arrangement	Length
1.	"Hesonoo"	Chancellor; Jakops	Chancellor; Jakops	Chancellor	0:57
2.	"X-Gene"	Chancellor; DayDay; Jakops	Chancellor; Jakops; Knave	Chancellor	1:25
3.	"Grl Gvng"	DayDay; Jakops; Rachel West	Jakops; Lantz; Rachel West	Lantz	3:08
4.	"TGIF"	Aleesia Stamkos; DayDay; Jakops; Lantz	220; Aleesia Stamkos; DayDay; Jakops; Lantz	220; Chancellor	2:51
5.	"New Dance"	Charla Warmley; Chancellor; Jakops; Sherwood Brown Jr.; Theron Thomas	Charla Warmley; Chancellor; Elliot Stroud; Jakops; Sherwood Brown Jr.; Theron Thomas	Chancellor; Elliot Stroud	3:18
6.	"Puppet Show"	DayDay; Jakops; Rachel West	220; DayDay; Jakops; Lantz; Rachel West	220; Lantz	3:19
Total length:					14:57

== Charts ==
=== Weekly charts ===
Weekly chart performance for New DNA
Chart (2023)	Peak position
Japanese Albums (Oricon)	2
Japanese Combined Albums (Oricon)	2
Japanese Hot Albums (Billboard Japan)	1
South Korean Albums (Circle)	8

=== Monthly charts ===
Monthly chart performance for New DNA
Chart (2023)	Peak position
Japanese Albums (Oricon)	11
South Korean Albums (Circle)	29

=== Year-end charts ===
Year-end chart performance for New DNA
Chart (2023)	Position
Japanese Albums (Oricon)	95
Japanese Hot Albums (Billboard Japan)	62

== Certifications ==
Certifications for New DNA
Region	Certification	Certified units/sales
Japan (RIAJ)	Gold	100,000^{^}
^{^} Shipments figures based on certification alone.

== Release history ==
Release history for New DNA
Region	Date	Format	Label
Various	September 27, 2023	CD; digital download; streaming	Xgalx
