= Hai Yorokonde =

Single by Kocchi no Kento
- Language: Japanese
- Released: May 27, 2024
- Genre: J-pop
- Length: 2:41
- Label: Blowout Inc.
- Composers: Kocchi no Kento; GRP
- Lyricist: Kocchi no Kento
- Producer: GRP

Kocchi no Kento singles chronology
"Iroha" (2023)	"Hai Yorokonde" (2024)	"Mō Ii yo" (2024)

Music video
- Hai Yorokonde on YouTube; English version on YouTube

"Hai Yorokonde" (Japanese: はいよろこんで; lit. 'I'll be so glad to') is a song by Japanese singer-songwriter and internet personality Kocchi no Kento, released as a single by Blowout Inc. on May 27, 2024.

Written by Kocchi no Kento and GRP, it is an up-tempo melancholy pop song about the daily lives of salarymen whose stress has peaked while struggling to overcome peer pressure. Kazuya Kanehisa created the single's retro-styled cover art and accompanied animated music video, which were inspired by Shōwa-era manga and anime, with some references of classic animated cartoons from late 1950s and early 1960s.

"Hai Yorokonde" went viral on social media in Japan shortly after its release along with its music video, which has amassed over 220 million views on YouTube. The song topped the Billboard Japan Heatseekers Songs, and subsequently peaked at number four on the Japan Hot 100 and number two on the Global Japan Songs Excl. Japan. The English version, translated by Penthouse's Shintaro Naomika, was released on July 31.

== Live performances ==
Kocchi no Kento gave a televised performance of "Hai Yorokonde" at CDTV Live! Live! on August 5, and performed again on September 23, October 7, and December 16. He appeared to sing the song on the YouTube channel The First Take on August 30, and at Music Station on October 25 and its 2024 Super Live edition on December 27. The song was included on the setlist for his first concert Yoitokose on December 13. The singer performed the song at the 66th Japan Record Awards on December 30, where he won Best New Artist, and the 75th NHK Kōhaku Uta Gassen the next day as the opening show.

== Other uses ==
A parody version of "Hai Yorokonde", titled "Hai Yorokonde Kikikiki Don", was featured in partnership with Nissin Foods for instant noodle Donbei television commercial, expressing the differences in the tastes of East and West Japan.

== Accolades ==
Awards and nominations for "Hai Yorokonde"
Ceremony	Year	Award	Result	Ref.
U-Can New Words and Buzzwords Awards	2024	New Words and Buzzwords Awards	Nominated	
MTV Video Music Awards Japan	2025	Best Animation Video	Won	
Music Awards Japan	2025	Best Music Video	Nominated	
Music Awards Japan	2025	Best Viral Song	Nominated	

== Credits and personnel ==
- Kocchi no Kento – vocals, lyrics, composition
- GRP – composition, arrangement
- Midori Furusawa – recording
- Hideki Ataki – mixing
- Kazuya Kanehisa – music video, cover artwork

== Charts ==
=== Weekly charts ===
Weekly chart performance for "Hai Yorokonde"
Chart (2024)	Peak position
Global Excl. US (Billboard)	99
Japan (Japan Hot 100)	4
Japan Heatseekers (Billboard Japan)	1
Japan Combined Singles (Oricon)	7
South Korea Download (Circle)	122

=== Year-end charts ===
2024 year-end chart performance for "Hai Yorokonde"
Chart (2024)	Position
Japan (Japan Hot 100)	30
Japan Heatseekers (Billboard Japan)	1

2025 year-end chart performance for "Hai Yorokonde"
Chart (2025)	Position
Japan (Japan Hot 100)	36

== Release history ==
Release dates and formats for "Hai Yorokonde"
Region	Date	Format	Version	Label	Ref.
Various	May 27, 2024	Digital download; streaming	Original	Blowout Inc.	
Various	July 31, 2024	Digital download; streaming	English	Blowout Inc.	
Various	August 25, 2024	Digital download; streaming	A cappella remix	Blowout Inc.	
Various	October 3, 2024	Digital download; streaming	From The First Take	Blowout Inc.	
Various	December 17, 2024	Digital download; streaming	Holiday remix	Blowout Inc.	
