= Jurin Asaya =

Japanese rapper (born 2002)

- 浅谷珠琳
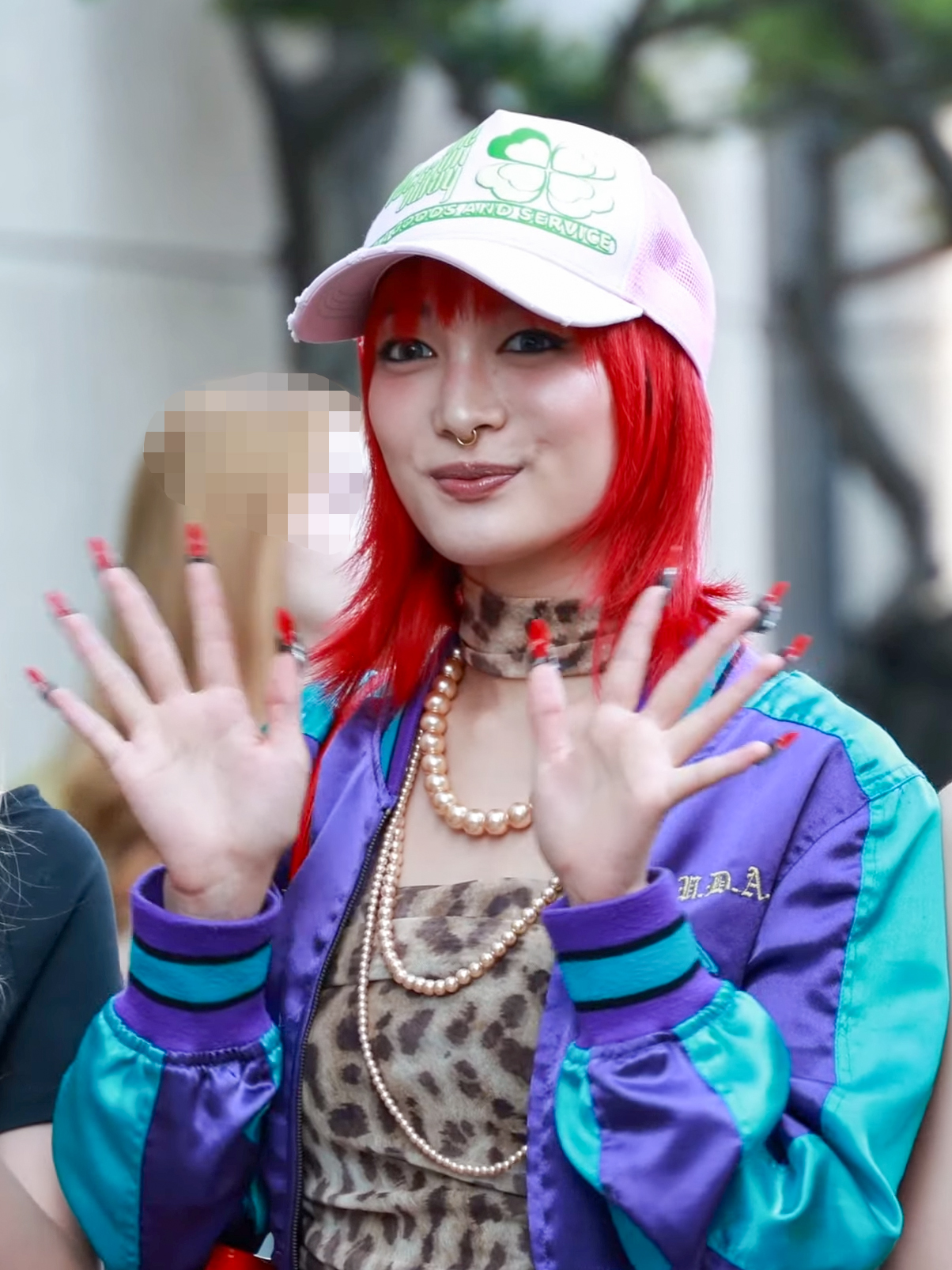
- Jurin in 2024
- Born: Jurin Asaya; June 19, 2002 (age 24); Chigasaki, Japan
- Occupations: Singer; rapper; dancer
- Years active: 2022–present
- Musical career
- Genres: Hip-hop; R&B
- Instrument: Vocals
- Label: Xgalx
- Member of: XG

Jurin Asaya (浅谷珠琳, Asaya Jurin; born June 19, 2002), also known mononymously as Jurin, is a Japanese rapper, singer and dancer based in South Korea. She is the leader of the Japanese group XG. She debuted as a solo artist on November 11, 2025, with her single "PS118" featuring Rapsody.

== Early life ==
Jurin Asaya was born on June 19, 2002, in Chigasaki, Japan. At the age of 3, Jurin took up snowboarding, and at the age of 12, she placed third in Japan's National Championship. She has won multiple Junior Olympic Cup snowboarding competitions. Jurin has also worked as a model for Japanese fashion magazines.

== Career ==
Jurin debuted as a member and leader of XG on March 18, 2022, with their single "Tippy Toes". On November 11, 2025, Jurin debuted as a solo artist with her English language hip-hop single "PS118" featuring Rapsody.

In February 2026, Jurin was featured on the cover of Numéro Tokyo magazine.

== Artistry ==
Jurin has named Destiny's Child, TLC, and Aaliyah as musical influences.

== Discography ==
=== Singles ===
Title	Year	Peak chart positions	Album
Title	Year	JPN Hot	Album
"PS118" (featuring Rapsody)	2025	87	Non-album single

== Videography ==
=== Music videos ===
Title	Year	Ref.
"PS118" (featuring Rapsody)	2025	
