= Amy Harvey =

Japanese rapper and singer (born 2002)

- ハーヴィー瑛美
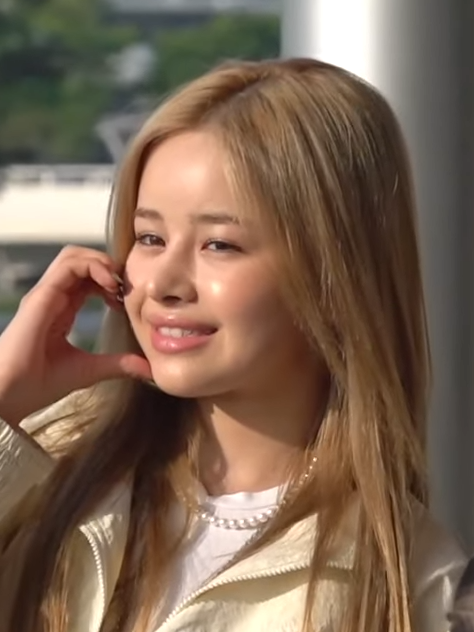
- Harvey in 2023
- Born: December 18, 2002 (age 23); Tokyo, Japan
- Other names: Harvey; Amy Jannet Harvey
- Occupations: Rapper; singer; model
- Years active: 2016–present
- Agent: Xgalx
- Musical career
- Genres: R&B; hip-hop
- Member of: XG

Amy Harvey (ハーヴィー 瑛美, Hāvī Eimi; born December 18, 2002), also known mononymously as Harvey, is a Japanese rapper, singer, and model based in South Korea. Harvey first began her career as a model after becoming one of six winners in the 2016 Tokyo Girls Audition, where she then modeled for magazines such as Love Berry, Nylon Japan, ViVi, and Vogue Girl Japan. She debuted as a member of the Japanese group XG in 2022.

== Early life ==
Amy Harvey was born to an Australian father and a Japanese mother. She is an only child. When she was in fifth grade, she studied cheer dance; in her first year of middle school, she transitioned to hip-hop dance with aspirations of becoming a rapper. In the same year, at the suggestion of her mother and being inspired by Miranda Kerr, Harvey decided to pursue modeling and studied fashion magazines from overseas that were provided by her mother. Harvey was later scouted at a large dance competition that she took part in.

== Career ==
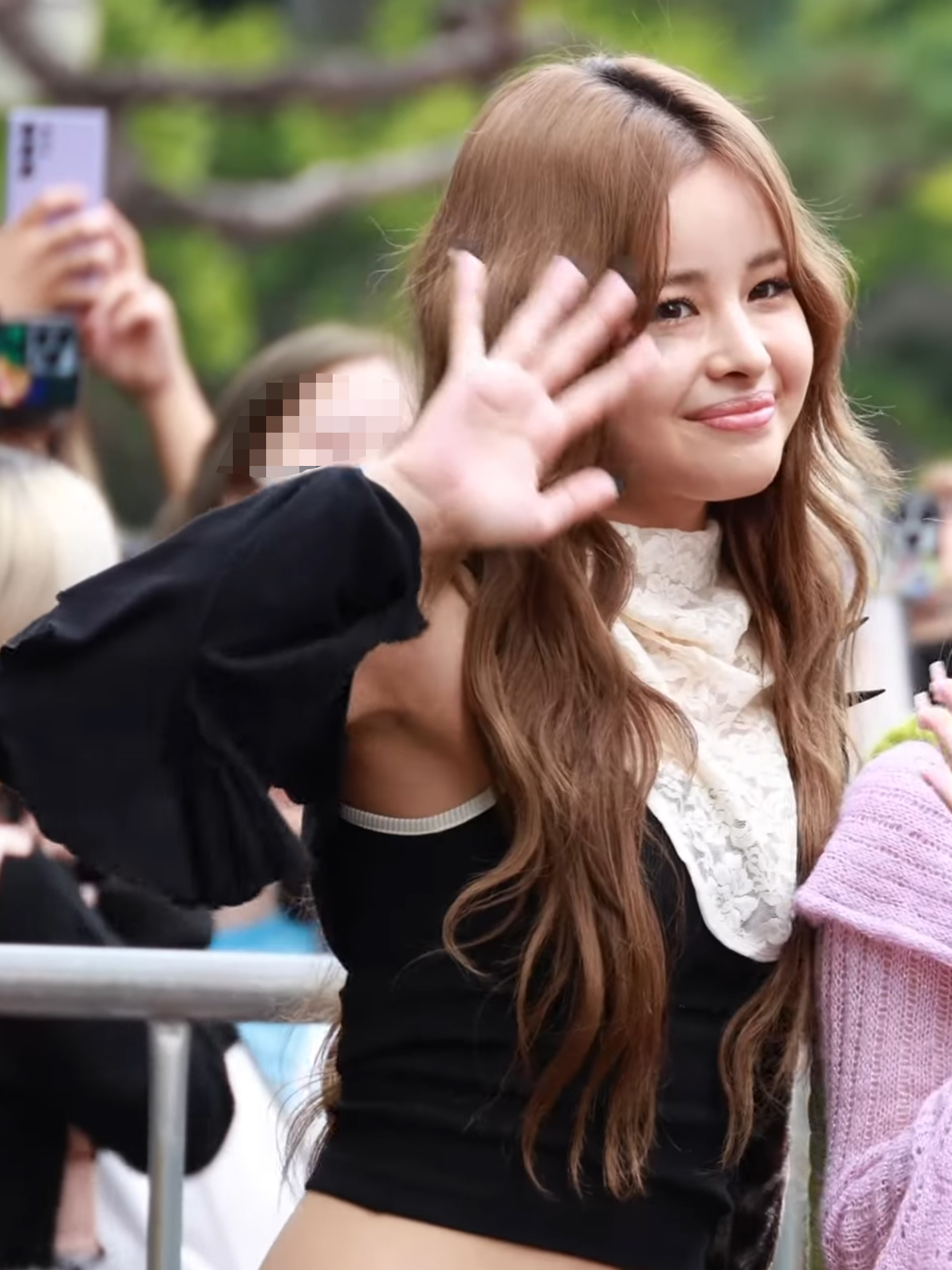
Harvey in 2023

At the age of 13, Harvey took part in the 2016 Tokyo Girls Audition, a modeling audition organized by Tokyo Girls Collection, Avex Group, and Ameba. She won the competition along with five other finalists. During the audition, she received awards from the magazines Soup, Nylon Japan, Bea's Up, Popteen, and Love Berry, winning the most awards over the other finalists. Following the event, Harvey modeled for issues 4 and 5 of Love Berry and the November 2016 issue of ViVi. Harvey was named an "it girl" by fashion publications such as Nylon Japan and Vogue Girl Japan.

With aspirations of becoming a singer, Harvey announced she was part of Avex Artist Academy in 2017. In March 2017, Harvey became the face of the make-up campaign So Good in Colors, a collaboration between MAC Cosmetics and Vogue Japan. Harvey also modeled in the seasonal promotions for the hair salon Shima, as well as for Elle Girl and Nylon Japan. On April 26, 2017, Harvey made her first television appearance on the variety show Konya Kurabete Mimashita. In 2018, Harvey modeled at the Amazon Fashion Week Tokyo Spring/Summer show and the 27th Tokyo Girls Collection Autumn/Winter show.

After 5 years of training at Avex, on March 18, 2022, Harvey debuted as a rapper and vocalist of the group XG under Xgalx.
