= Awe (EP) =

EP by XG
- Released: November 8, 2024
- Length: 23:31
- Languages: English; Korean; Japanese
- Label: Xgalx

XG chronology
New DNA (2023)	Awe (2024)	XDM Unidentified Waves (2025)

Singles from Awe
- 1. "Something Ain't Right" Released: July 26, 2024; 2. "IYKYK" Released: October 11, 2024; 3. "Howling" Released: November 8, 2024; 4. "Is This Love" Released: March 7, 2025; 5. "In the Rain" Released: April 11, 2025

Awe is the second extended play (EP) by Japanese vocal group XG. It was released on November 8, 2024, through Xgalx, and was the group's follow-up album release to their first, New DNA, in 2023. Similar to their first, the EP is recorded primarily in English. It was promoted with five singles: "Something Ain't Right" and "IYKYK", preceded the EP's release; "Howling", released concurrently with the EP; and "Is This Love" and "In the Rain", after the EP's release.

== Background and release ==
In early July 2024, XG teased the single "Something Ain't Right" and announced its release for July 26, intending for it to be a pre-release single for an upcoming EP. On July 23, XG released "Undefeated", a song collaboration with the video game Valorant. The release coincided with the group's announcement of their second EP, Awe, which was made the next day. On September 13, XG announced that the album would be released on November 8. A second pre-release single, "IYKYK", was announced in October and released on October 11.

On November 8, XG released Awe alongside a music video for its lead single, "Howling". The EP also included the September remix of the group's earlier June single, "Woke Up". The remix featured verses in English, Korean, and Japanese by Jay Park, OZworld, AKLO, Paloalto, Verbal, Awich, Tak, and Dok2.

In an interview with Elle, XG member Chisa noted that the album title is pronounced "ow", mimicking a wolf's howling. The album title, in succession with the wolf themes shown in their previous 2024 releases, uses the motif of a wolf pack to symbolize the group's relationship with their fans. Other visual, conceptual themes in the release include outer space and ghosts.

== Composition ==
Awe starts with "Howl", an orchestral synth-led intro track. The second track, "Howling", is an R&B and hip-hop song with elements of drill and Jersey club in its production. Throughout the song, sounds and howls of wolves are heard alongside "intense" synths. It served as the EP's lead single. In an interview with Elle, member Maya spoke about how "Howling" relates to the group's relationship with their fans, known as "Alphaz":

The Alphaz [symbolize] being the wolf pack leaders. So just howling together means becoming one with our fans. And that represents how our fans, Alphaz, and XG are always connected together, and I think that's what we wanted to deliver through our songs in this album as well. If we release this album and the main title "Howling", I feel like the Alphaz can be more connected to us and understand the real meaning of why we're howling all together from the start to the end.

Following a skit set in a spaceship, the uptempo and "sleek" dance-pop tracks "IYKYK" and "Something Ain't Right" show the versatility of the group. "IYKYK" is an "addictive" dance track that blends house and 2-step music with R&B melodies that samples "Prism" by Japanese hip-hop group M-Flo. Taku Takahashi, a member of M-Flo, told Rolling Stone Japan that "IYKYK" is "made with only the minimal necessary sounds, without adding any unnecessary elements, making the most of the original material while adding new melodies and atmosphere. Moreover, in the rap part, the original sample is subtly included, and this sense of balance is brilliant." XG's producer, Simon Jakops, also said that he decided on the title of "IYKYK" before the song was created. The fifth track, "Something Ain't Right", is a garage and house infused song echoing the melodies of and music of the 1990s and the suspicions of "Say My Name" by Destiny's Child.

Leaning back into the group's signature sound, "In the Rain" is an R&B song featuring lyrics of heartbreak and resentment after a breakup. In live performances, in line with the song's title and lyrics, performances often feature the use of umbrellas. "In The Rain" was XG's first R&B track, and unlike their pop songs, careful attention was paid to emotional expression and atmosphere during recording.

The seventh track of the album is a remix of "Woke Up" which was released earlier in the year on May 24, 2024. The remix features new verses in English, Japanese and Korean by Jay Park, OZworld, AKLO, Paloalto, Verbal, Awich, Tak, and Dok2. Simon Jakops spoke about the remix, saying that "Since it was our memorable first all-rap song, I thought it was necessary to amplify its appeal within hip-hop culture. I have roots in both Japan and Korea, and both countries have a solid hip-hop scene. When I imagined who I would want to do the remix for 'Woke Up', it ended up being those members."

"Is This Love" is a pop and R&B song with lyrics of optimism towards finding a new love in someone. The song was first created by Simon Jakops in 2019, three years before XG's debut. Member Chisa commented on the song, saying, "Since we usually don't sing much about love, I think it will sound quite fresh from XG's perspective and interpretation". After its release, this song was adopted as the campaign song for Shiseido's skin care brand Anessa, and on March 7, 2025, it was released digitally as a recut single with an added piano version and instrumental tracks for both the original and piano version.

== Track listing ==
Awe track listing
No.	Title	Lyrics	Music	Arrangement	Length
1.	"Howl"		Jakops; Tayor	Jakops; Tayor	1:18
2.	"Howling"	Chancellor; Jakops; Knave; Jaeyoung; Lyricks	Chancellor; Jakops; Knave; Jaeyoung; Lyricks	Chancellor; Jakops	3:08
3.	"Space Meeting Skit"		Jakops; Tayor	Jakops; Tayor	0:51
4.	"IYKYK"	Chancellor; Jakops; Knave; Paulina "Pau" Cerrilla; Nick Kandler	Chancellor; Jakops; Knave; Cerrilla; Nick Kandler; Xansei	220; Chancellor; Jakops; Tayor; Xansei	3:00
5.	"Something Ain't Right"	Jakops; Chancellor; Benjmn; Feli Ferraro; Akil "worldwidefresh" King	Jakops; Chancellor; Tayor; Benjmn; Feli Ferraro; King; Johnny Goldstein	Jakops; Chancellor; Tayor; Benjmn; Goldstein	3:10
6.	"In the Rain"	Chancellor; Jakops; Cerrilla; Knave, Shintaro Yasuda	Jakops; Chancellor; Yasuda; Cerrilla; Knave; Mason Sacks; her0ism	Jakops; Chancellor; Yasuda; her0ism; Sacks	3:08
7.	"Woke Up Remixx" (featuring Jay Park, OZworld, AKLO, Paloalto, Verbal, Awich, Tak and Dok2)	Jakops; Chancellor; Jay Park; OZworld; AKLO; Paloalto; Verbal; Awich; Tak; Dok2	Jakops; Chancellor; Yasuda	Jakops; Chancellor; Yasuda; Tayor	6:19
8.	"Is This Love"	Jakops; Bianca "Blush" Atterberry; Chancellor; Knave; Mychole "Starr" Anderson	Jakops; Bluebird; Scootie; Atterberry; Chancellor; Tayor; Knave; Bastian "B" Testori; tild tomorrow; Anderson	Jakops; Bluebird; Scootie; Chancellor; Tayor; Knave; Testori; tild tomorrow	2:35
Total length:					23:31

== Charts ==
=== Weekly charts ===
Weekly chart performance for Awe
Chart (2024)	Peak position
Japanese Albums (Oricon)	3
Japanese Combined Albums (Oricon)	3
Japanese Hot Albums (Billboard Japan)	3
South Korean Albums (Circle)	15
US Billboard 200	175
US Independent Albums (Billboard)	25

=== Monthly charts ===
Monthly chart performance for Awe
Chart (2024)	Position
Japanese Albums (Oricon)	8
South Korean Albums (Circle)	42

=== Year-end charts ===
2024 year-end chart performance for Awe
Chart (2024)	Position
Japanese Albums (Oricon)	66
Japanese Hot Albums (Billboard Japan)	69

2025 year-end chart performance for Awe
Chart (2025)	Position
Japanese Hot Albums (Billboard Japan)	67

== Certifications ==
Certifications for Awe
Region	Certification	Certified units/sales
Japan (RIAJ) Physical	Gold	100,000^{^}
^{^} Shipments figures based on certification alone.
