= Grand Prix (CD Shop Awards) =

Japanese music award

- Awarded for: Music albums
- Country: Japan
- Presented by: CD Shop Awards
- First award: Shifon Shugi by Sōtaisei Riron (2009)
- Currently held by: Screaming Newborn Baby by Hi-Standard and Kurayamisaka yori Ai wo Komete by Kurayamisaka (2026)

Highlights
- Most wins: Gen Hoshino; Fujii Kaze; Official Hige Dandism; Kenshi Yonezu (2 each)
- Most nominations: Back Number; Gen Hoshino; Sakanaction; Kenshi Yonezu (5 each)
- Website: cdshop-kumiai.jp

The Grand Prix (Japanese: 大賞, Hepburn: Taishō) is held annually by the CD Shop Awards to honor music albums in Japan. Voted on by employees from record shops across Japan, the Grand Prix is awarded to Japanese albums of original material released within the preceding year, excluding live albums and compilations. Multiple stages of voting are held, determining candidates and the winner. Non-winners who make it to the final stage are still honored as finalists in a separate category. Some earlier years also included a runner-up award, presented to upwards of three candidates, but it was last used in 2018.

The first Grand Prix was presented in 2009 to indie rock band Sōtaisei Riron for Shifon Shugi, with runners-up Ohashi Trio for This Is Music and Perfume for Game. Gen Hoshino was the first solo artist to win the Grand Prix with Yellow Dancer in 2016. In 2019, the Grand Prix was divided into two categories, "Red" for the best overall album and "Blue" for the best album by a newcomer. The inaugural recipients for the Red and Blue categories were, respectively, Gen Hoshino for Pop Virus — making Hoshino the first two-time winner — and Yuta Orisaka for Heisei. Initially only winners were split up, but all nominees have been divided into these categories since 2023. Fujii Kaze is the only artist to have won in both categories, with Help Ever Hurt Never for Blue in 2021 and Love All Serve All for Red in 2023.

Back Number, Gen Hoshino, Sakanaction, and Kenshi Yonezu are tied for the most nominations, at five each. In 2025, artists with two previous wins were removed from consideration for the Grand Prix and instead named to a Hall of Fame. There are currently four artists in the Hall of Fame: Fujii Kaze, Gen Hoshino, Official Hige Dandism, and Kenshi Yonezu. The most recent winners as of 2026 are Hi-Standard with Screaming Newborn Baby (Red) and Kurayamisaka with Kurayamisaka yori Ai wo Komete (Blue).

== Winners and finalists ==
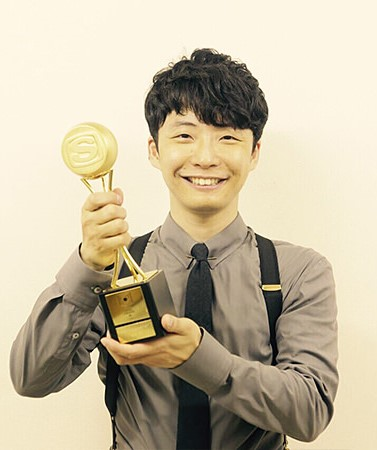
With Yellow Dancer (2016) and Pop Virus (2019), Gen Hoshino was the first artist to win twice. He was also the first solo artist to win the award.

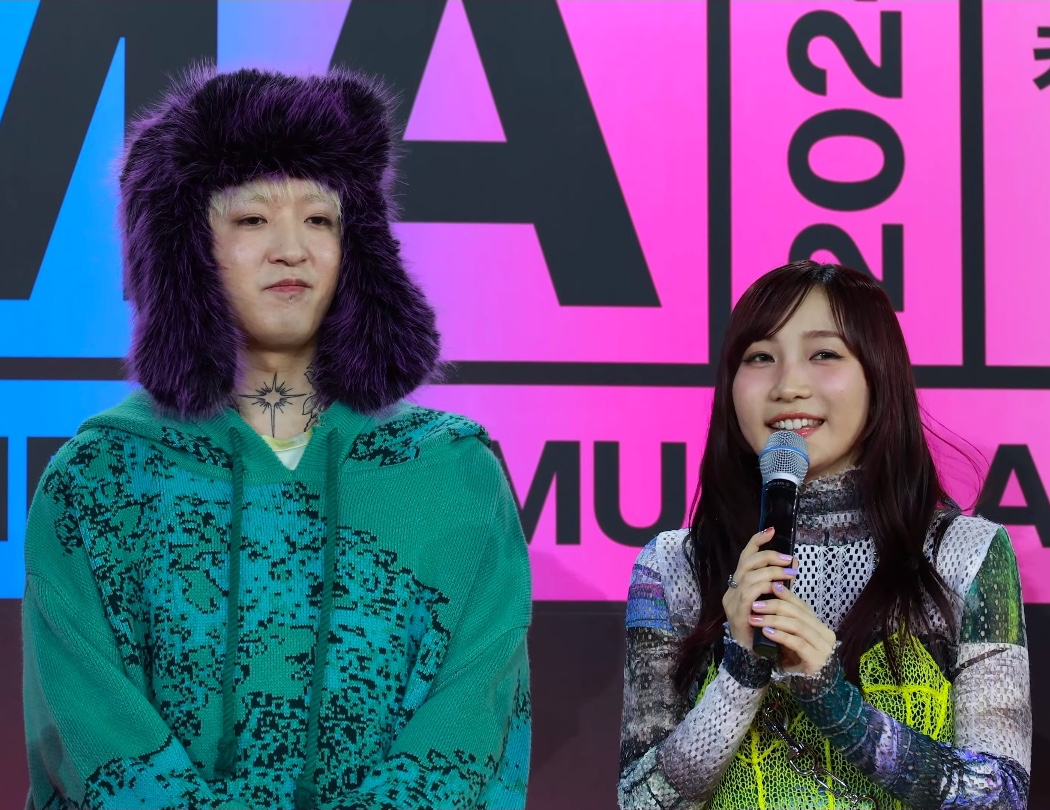
With The Book and The Book 2 in 2022, Yoasobi is the only act to be nominated twice in one year.

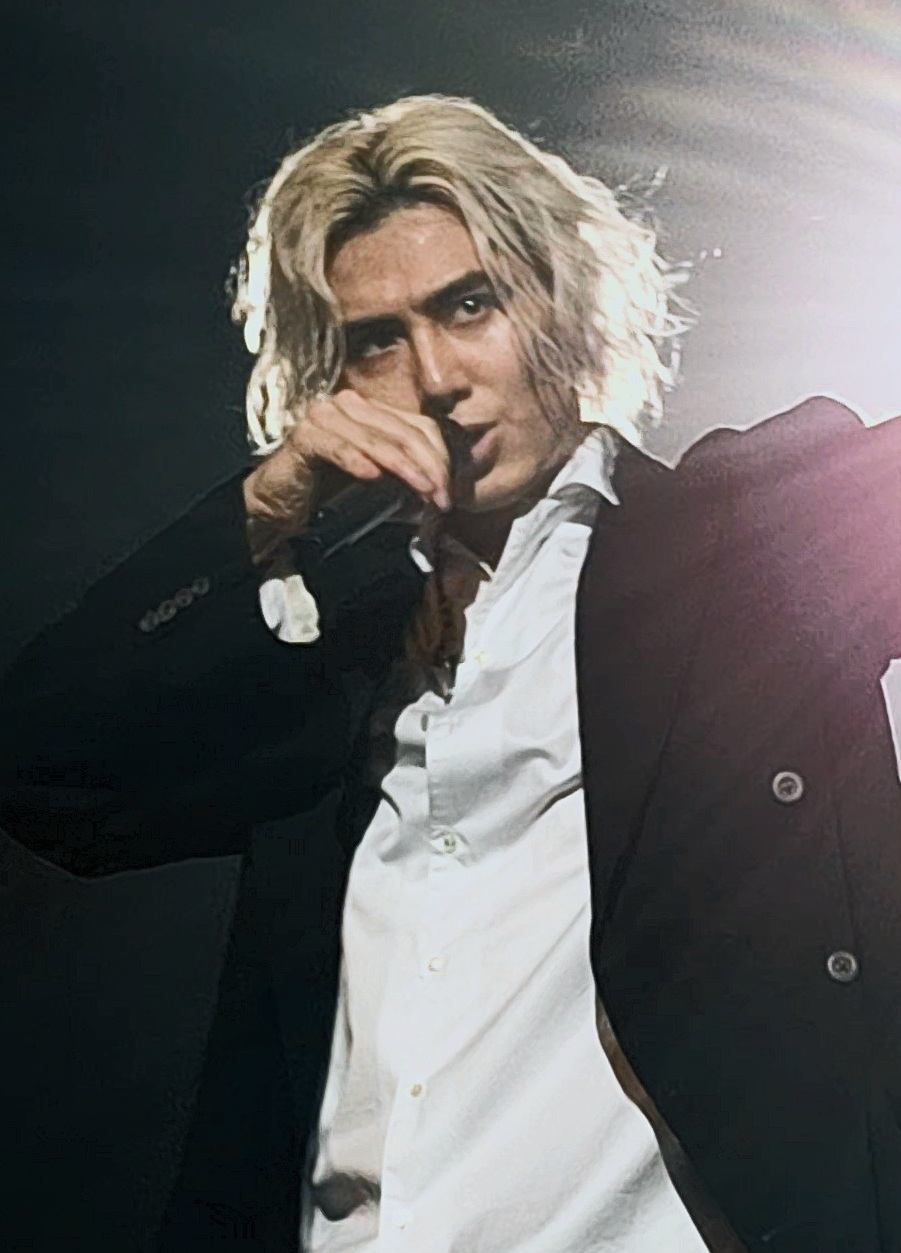
Fujii Kaze has won the Grand Prix in both the Blue and Red categories, with Help Ever Hurt Never (2021) and Love All Serve All (2023), respectively.

Key
| † | Indicates winner |
| ‡ | Indicates runner-up |

List of winners and finalists (246 total)
| Year | Album | Artist | Cat. | Ref. |
|---|---|---|---|---|
| 2009 (1st) | Shifon Shugi † | Sōtaisei Riron | —N/a | |
| 2009 (1st) | This Is Music ‡ | Ohashi Trio | —N/a | |
| 2009 (1st) | Game ‡ | Perfume | —N/a | |
| 2009 (1st) | Heart Station | Hikaru Utada | —N/a | |
| 2009 (1st) | HeartY | HY | —N/a | |
| 2009 (1st) | Honyarara | Sakerock | —N/a | |
| 2009 (1st) | Superfly | Superfly | —N/a | |
| 2009 (1st) | Alright | Motohiro Hata | —N/a | |
| 2009 (1st) | Floating Pupa | Pupa | —N/a | |
| 2009 (1st) | Supermarket Fantasy | Mr. Children | —N/a | |
| 2010 (2nd) | This Is My Story † | The Bawdies | —N/a | |
| 2010 (2nd) | Philosophy ‡ | Ryujin Kiyoshi | —N/a | |
| 2010 (2nd) | Box Emotions ‡ | Superfly | —N/a | |
| 2010 (2nd) | Free | Mao Abe | —N/a | |
| 2010 (2nd) | Shin-shiro | Sakanaction | —N/a | |
| 2010 (2nd) | Sanmon Gossip | Ringo Sheena | —N/a | |
| 2010 (2nd) | Ainowa | Hanaregumi | —N/a | |
| 2010 (2nd) | Fact | Fact | —N/a | |
| 2010 (2nd) | Chambre | Unicorn | —N/a | |
| 2010 (2nd) | Altocolony no Teiri | Radwimps | —N/a | |
| 2011 (3rd) | Fanfare to Nekkyō † | Andymori | —N/a | |
| 2011 (3rd) | Tomodachi o Koroshite Made. ‡ | Shinsei Kamattechan | —N/a | |
| 2011 (3rd) | Earth ‡ | Sekai no Owari | —N/a | |
| 2011 (3rd) | Documentary ‡ | Motohiro Hata | —N/a | |
| 2011 (3rd) | Orkonpood | Tarō Kobayashi | —N/a | |
| 2011 (3rd) | Kikuuiki | Sakanaction | —N/a | |
| 2011 (3rd) | Shall We Travel?? | Naoto Inti Raymi | —N/a | |
| 2011 (3rd) | Billion Voices | Tavito Nanao | —N/a | |
| 2011 (3rd) | The Die Is Cast | Fat Prop | —N/a | |
| 2011 (3rd) | Baka no Uta | Gen Hoshino | —N/a | |
| 2011 (3rd) | Top of the Fuck'n World | The Mirraz | —N/a | |
| 2012 (4th) | Battle and Romance † | Momoiro Clover Z | —N/a | |
| 2012 (4th) | Episode ‡ | Gen Hoshino | —N/a | |
| 2012 (4th) | Sono Saki no Ao e | Ikumi Kumagai | —N/a | |
| 2012 (4th) | Documentaly | Sakanaction | —N/a | |
| 2012 (4th) | Real-Time Singer-Songwriter | Yu Takahashi | —N/a | |
| 2012 (4th) | Superstar | Back Number | —N/a | |
| 2012 (4th) | Man with a Mission | Man with a Mission | —N/a | |
| 2013 (5th) | Mash Up the World † | Man with a Mission | —N/a | |
| 2013 (5th) | Pamyu Pamyu Revolution ‡ | Kyary Pamyu Pamyu | —N/a | |
| 2013 (5th) | Shinu made Aisareteru to Omotteta yo | Creep Hyp | —N/a | |
| 2013 (5th) | Entertainment | Sekai no Owari | —N/a | |
| 2013 (5th) | Little Melody | Tavito Nanao | —N/a | |
| 2013 (5th) | Blues | Back Number | —N/a | |
| 2013 (5th) | Diorama | Kenshi Yonezu | —N/a | |
| 2014 (6th) | Yoshū Fukushū † | Maximum the Hormone | —N/a | |
| 2014 (6th) | Fukikoboreru Hodo no Ai, Ai, Ai | Creep Hyp | —N/a | |
| 2014 (6th) | Odorenai nara, Gesu ni Natte Shimae yo | Gesu no Kiwami Otome | —N/a | |
| 2014 (6th) | Sakanaction | Sakanaction | —N/a | |
| 2014 (6th) | Enshutsuka Shutsuen | Passepied | —N/a | |
| 2014 (6th) | Level3 | Perfume | —N/a | |
| 2014 (6th) | Stranger | Gen Hoshino | —N/a | |
| 2014 (6th) | Delight | Miwa | —N/a | |
| 2014 (6th) | Jinsei×Boku= | One Ok Rock | —N/a | |
| 2015 (7th) | Babymetal † | Babymetal | —N/a | |
| 2015 (7th) | Amazing Sky | Rina Katahira | —N/a | |
| 2015 (7th) | Fake World Wonderland | Kinoko Teikoku | —N/a | |
| 2015 (7th) | The Pier | Quruli | —N/a | |
| 2015 (7th) | Let's Dance Raw | Shintaro Sakamoto | —N/a | |
| 2015 (7th) | Hi Izuru Tokoro | Ringo Sheena | —N/a | |
| 2015 (7th) | Love Story | Back Number | —N/a | |
| 2015 (7th) | Tales of Purefly | Man with a Mission | —N/a | |
| 2015 (7th) | Yankee | Kenshi Yonezu | —N/a | |
| 2016 (8th) | Yellow Dancer † | Gen Hoshino | —N/a | |
| 2016 (8th) | Zipangu ‡ | Wednesday Campanella | —N/a | |
| 2016 (8th) | Are You Coming? ‡ | Wanima | —N/a | |
| 2016 (8th) | L (El) | Acid Black Cherry | —N/a | |
| 2016 (8th) | Happy | Sakurako Ohara | —N/a | |
| 2016 (8th) | Obsure Ride | Cero | —N/a | |
| 2016 (8th) | Chandelier | Back Number | —N/a | |
| 2016 (8th) | Bremen | Kenshi Yonezu | —N/a | |
| 2017 (9th) | Fantôme † | Hikaru Utada | —N/a | |
| 2017 (9th) | Daydream ‡ | Aimer | —N/a | |
| 2017 (9th) | Exist! | Alexandros | —N/a | |
| 2017 (9th) | D.A.N. | D.A.N. | —N/a | |
| 2017 (9th) | Fam Fam | Never Young Beach | —N/a | |
| 2017 (9th) | Woman's | My Hair Is Bad | —N/a | |
| 2017 (9th) | Your Name | Radwimps | —N/a | |
| 2018 (10th) | Bootleg † | Kenshi Yonezu | —N/a | |
| 2018 (10th) | Shoki no Taifu Club ‡ | Taifu Club | —N/a | |
| 2018 (10th) | Modern Times ‡ | Punpee | —N/a | |
| 2018 (10th) | Masshiro na Mono wa Yogoshitaku naru | Keyakizaka46 | —N/a | |
| 2018 (10th) | The Kids | Suchmos | —N/a | |
| 2018 (10th) | Peace Out | Pistol Takehara | —N/a | |
| 2018 (10th) | Pink | Chai | —N/a | |
| 2018 (10th) | The Gift | Hi-Standard | —N/a | |
| 2018 (10th) | The Guerrilla Bish | Bish | —N/a | |
| 2018 (10th) | Mothers | My Hair Is Bad | —N/a | |
| 2019 (11th) | Pop Virus † | Gen Hoshino | Red | |
| 2019 (11th) | Heisei † | Yuta Orisaka | Blue | |
| 2019 (11th) | Hatsukoi | Hikaru Utada | —N/a | |
| 2019 (11th) | Wake Up | Elephant Kashimashi | —N/a | |
| 2019 (11th) | Escaparade | Official Hige Dandism | —N/a | |
| 2019 (11th) | Shukusai | Kaneko Ayano | —N/a | |
| 2019 (11th) | Ài Qíng | Kid Fresino | —N/a | |
| 2019 (11th) | Tadashii Itsuwarikarano Kishō | Zutto Mayonaka de Ii no ni. | —N/a | |
| 2019 (11th) | Poli Life Multi Soul | Cero | —N/a | |
| 2019 (11th) | Everybody!! | Wanima | —N/a | |
| 2020 (12th) | Traveler † | Official Hige Dandism | Red | |
| 2020 (12th) | Sansan † | Kaneko Ayano | Blue | |
| 2020 (12th) | Momentary Sixth Sense | Aimyon | —N/a | |
| 2020 (12th) | So Kakkoii Uchuu | Kenji Ozawa | —N/a | |
| 2020 (12th) | Sympa | King Gnu | —N/a | |
| 2020 (12th) | 9999 | The Yellow Monkey | —N/a | |
| 2020 (12th) | 834.194 | Sakanaction | —N/a | |
| 2020 (12th) | Sandokushi | Ringo Sheena | —N/a | |
| 2020 (12th) | Mikke | Spitz | —N/a | |
| 2020 (12th) | Chime | Sumika | —N/a | |
| 2020 (12th) | Songs of Innocence & Experience | DYGL | —N/a | |
| 2020 (12th) | With Love from the 21st Century | Tempalay | —N/a | |
| 2020 (12th) | Air Ni Ni | Hakushi Hasegawa | —N/a | |
| 2020 (12th) | Night Flow | Pasocom Music Club | —N/a | |
| 2020 (12th) | Carrots and Sticks | Bish | —N/a | |
| 2021 (13th) | Stray Sheep † | Kenshi Yonezu | Red | |
| 2021 (13th) | Help Ever Hurt Never † | Fujii Kaze | Blue | |
| 2021 (13th) | Heard That There's Good Pasta | Aimyon | —N/a | |
| 2021 (13th) | Windswept Adan | Ichiko Aoba | —N/a | |
| 2021 (13th) | Orion Blue | Uru | —N/a | |
| 2021 (13th) | Iratsuku Toki wa Itsu Datte | Orange Spiny Crab | —N/a | |
| 2021 (13th) | Teen Teen Teen | Kalma | —N/a | |
| 2021 (13th) | Ceremony | King Gnu | —N/a | |
| 2021 (13th) | Nē Minna Daisuki Da yo | Ging Nang Boyz | —N/a | |
| 2021 (13th) | Katsute Tensai Datta Oretachi e | Creepy Nuts | —N/a | |
| 2021 (13th) | Klue | Gezan | —N/a | |
| 2021 (13th) | Strobo | Vaundy | —N/a | |
| 2021 (13th) | Powers | Hitsujibungaku | —N/a | |
| 2021 (13th) | Hope | Macaroni Enpitsu | —N/a | |
| 2021 (13th) | Soundtracks | Mr. Children | —N/a | |
| 2021 (13th) | Miyamoto, Dokupo | Hiroji Miyamoto | —N/a | |
| 2021 (13th) | Eyes | Milet | —N/a | |
| 2021 (13th) | Plagiarism | Yorushika | —N/a | |
| 2021 (13th) | Leo-Nine | Lisa | —N/a | |
| 2021 (13th) | Romantic Love | Roman Kakumei | —N/a | |
| 2022 (14th) | Editorial † | Official Hige Dandism | Red | |
| 2022 (14th) | Once Upon a Revival † | WurtS | Blue | |
| 2022 (14th) | Grower | Awesome City Club | —N/a | |
| 2022 (14th) | State of Mind | Yuta Orisaka | —N/a | |
| 2022 (14th) | Yosuga | Kaneko Ayano | —N/a | |
| 2022 (14th) | 20, Stop It | Kid Fresino | —N/a | |
| 2022 (14th) | Case | Creepy Nuts | —N/a | |
| 2022 (14th) | Yoru ni Shigamitsuite, Asa de Tokashite | Creep Hyp | —N/a | |
| 2022 (14th) | Lens | Kroi | —N/a | |
| 2022 (14th) | Gusokumuzu | Gusokumuzu | —N/a | |
| 2022 (14th) | Lazy Sunday | Saucy Dog | —N/a | |
| 2022 (14th) | Presence | Stuts and Takako Matsu with 3 Exes | —N/a | |
| 2022 (14th) | Amusic | Sumika | —N/a | |
| 2022 (14th) | I Love You | Super Beaver | —N/a | |
| 2022 (14th) | Gusare | Zutto Mayonaka de Ii no ni. | —N/a | |
| 2022 (14th) | NEE | NEE | —N/a | |
| 2022 (14th) | Anti-Freeze | Natsuko Nisshoku | —N/a | |
| 2022 (14th) | U | NiziU | —N/a | |
| 2022 (14th) | Era | Hakubi | —N/a | |
| 2022 (14th) | Achatter | Hump Back | —N/a | |
| 2022 (14th) | Boku no Supi na Mun-Taro | Maharajan | —N/a | |
| 2022 (14th) | Millenium Parade | Millenium Parade | —N/a | |
| 2022 (14th) | The Book | Yoasobi | —N/a | |
| 2022 (14th) | The Book 2 | Yoasobi | —N/a | |
| 2023 (15th) | Love All Serve All † | Fujii Kaze | Red | |
| 2023 (15th) | Falling Into Your Eyes Record | Aimyon | Red | |
| 2023 (15th) | Kyōgen | Ado | Red | |
| 2023 (15th) | Bad Mode | Hikaru Utada | Red | |
| 2023 (15th) | The End of Yesterday | Ellegarden | Red | |
| 2023 (15th) | Early Sumer 2022 | Kazumasa Oda | Red | |
| 2023 (15th) | Music, Dance & Love | Original Love | Red | |
| 2023 (15th) | Ensemble Play | Creepy Nuts | Red | |
| 2023 (15th) | Like a Fable | Shintaro Sakamoto | Red | |
| 2023 (15th) | Tokyo | Super Beaver | Red | |
| 2023 (15th) | 1999 | Nishina | Red | |
| 2023 (15th) | Unity | Mrs. Green Apple | Red | |
| 2023 (15th) | Softly | Tatsuro Yamashita | Red | |
| 2023 (15th) | Ichi | Yuuri | Red | |
| 2023 (15th) | Our Hope † | Hitsujibungaku | Blue | |
| 2023 (15th) | Ego Apartment | Ego Apartment | Blue | |
| 2023 (15th) | Telegraph | Kroi | Blue | |
| 2023 (15th) | Pencil Rocket | Hockrockb | Blue | |
| 2023 (15th) | Sunny Bottle | Saucy Dog | Blue | |
| 2023 (15th) | Chilli Beans. | Chilli Beans. | Blue | |
| 2023 (15th) | Let's Go! DSDC! | Deep Sea Diving Club | Blue | |
| 2023 (15th) | Be:1 | Be:First | Blue | |
| 2023 (15th) | Memory | Marcy | Blue | |
| 2023 (15th) | Aoinisai | Wanuka | Blue | |
| 2024 (16th) | Antenna † | Mrs. Green Apple | Red | |
| 2024 (16th) | Towelket wa Odayakana | Kaneko Ayano | Red | |
| 2024 (16th) | The Greatest Unknown | King Gnu | Red | |
| 2024 (16th) | Himitsu Studio | Spitz | Red | |
| 2024 (16th) | Jinkōgaku | Zutto Mayonaka de Ii no ni. | Red | |
| 2024 (16th) | E O | Cero | Red | |
| 2024 (16th) | Replica | Vaundy | Red | |
| 2024 (16th) | Humor | Back Number | Red | |
| 2024 (16th) | Miss You | Mr. Children | Red | |
| 2024 (16th) | The Book 3 | Yoasobi | Red | |
| 2024 (16th) | Maningen † | Atarashii Gakko! | Blue | |
| 2024 (16th) | Abura na Town 1: Shinitakunatte kara ga Honban | Aburi na Town | Blue | |
| 2024 (16th) | Kaze | Alstake | Blue | |
| 2024 (16th) | New DNA | XG | Blue | |
| 2024 (16th) | Kessoku Band | Kessoku Band | Blue | |
| 2024 (16th) | Intro | Tonun | Blue | |
| 2024 (16th) | Two Moon | Tomoo | Blue | |
| 2024 (16th) | Balcony | Penthouse | Blue | |
| 2024 (16th) | Jinrui Metsubou Wonderland | Brandy Senki | Blue | |
| 2025 (17th) | Your Favorite Things † | Satoko Shibata | Red | |
| 2025 (17th) | Jealous of Cats | Aimyon | Red | |
| 2025 (17th) | Zanmu | Ado | Red | |
| 2025 (17th) | Sparkle X | The Yellow Monkey | Red | |
| 2025 (17th) | Awe | XG | Red | |
| 2025 (17th) | Back to the Pops | Glay | Red | |
| 2025 (17th) | Carnival | Ringo Sheena | Red | |
| 2025 (17th) | Precious Days | Mariya Takeuchi | Red | |
| 2025 (17th) | Musi-am | Da-ice | Red | |
| 2025 (17th) | Iris | Bump of Chicken | Red | |
| 2025 (17th) | 12 Hugs (Like Butterflies) | Hitsujibungaku | Red | |
| 2025 (17th) | Rikon Densetsu † | Rikon Densetsu | Blue | |
| 2025 (17th) | Aooo | Aooo | Blue | |
| 2025 (17th) | Hokorobi | Sonoko Inoue | Blue | |
| 2025 (17th) | Bonsai | Imase | Blue | |
| 2025 (17th) | Kakugo o Kimero! | Sabasister | Blue | |
| 2025 (17th) | Chevon | Chevon | Blue | |
| 2025 (17th) | Tradition | Cho Co Pa Co Cho Co Quin Quin | Blue | |
| 2025 (17th) | Shin-kigeki | Niko Niko Tan Tan | Blue | |
| 2025 (17th) | Songs for the Cryptids | Bialystocks | Blue | |
| 2025 (17th) | New Kawaii | Fruits Zipper | Blue | |
| 2025 (17th) | Voodoo Club | Voodoo Club | Blue | |
| 2025 (17th) | Easy Rider | Mari | Blue | |
| 2025 (17th) | Dungeon | Muque | Blue | |
| 2026 (18th) | Screaming Newborn Baby † | Hi-Standard | Red | |
| 2026 (18th) | Luminescent Creatures | Ichiko Aoba | Red | |
| 2026 (18th) | Legion | Creepy Nuts | Red | |
| 2026 (18th) | Thank You So Much | Southern All Stars | Red | |
| 2026 (18th) | Dear Mysteries | Tomoo | Red | |
| 2026 (18th) | Nebula Romance: Part II | Perfume | Red | |
| 2026 (18th) | FYOP | B'z | Red | |
| 2026 (18th) | Wormhole/Yumi AraI | Yumi Matsutoya | Red | |
| 2026 (18th) | Anew | Radwimps | Red | |
| 2026 (18th) | Channel U | Ryokuoushoku Shakai | Red | |
| 2026 (18th) | Detox | One Ok Rock | Red | |
| 2026 (18th) | Kurayamisaka yori Ai wo Komete † | Kurayamisaka | Blue | |
| 2026 (18th) | A One & Two | Chappo | Blue | |
| 2026 (18th) | Aeka | Jo0ji | Blue | |
| 2026 (18th) | Abara | Suzuki Miki's | Blue | |
| 2026 (18th) | 15 | Tuki | Blue | |
| 2026 (18th) | Saisei Kanō | NEE | Blue | |
| 2026 (18th) | Fragile Report | Nikon | Blue | |
| 2026 (18th) | 27℃ | Hammer Head Shark | Blue | |
| 2026 (18th) | Paledusk | Paledusk | Blue | |
| 2026 (18th) | Voodoo Yuugi | Voodoo Club | Blue | |
| 2026 (18th) | Dope | Muque | Blue | |

== Artists with most nominations ==
List of artists with three or more finalist awards, runners-up, or wins
| Nominations | Artist |
|---|---|
| 5 | Back Number |
| 5 | Gen Hoshino |
| 5 | Sakanaction |
| 5 | Kenshi Yonezu |
| 4 | Aimyon |
| 4 | Creepy Nuts |
| 4 | Kaneko Ayano |
| 4 | Ringo Sheena |
| 4 | Hikaru Utada |
| 3 | Cero |
| 3 | Creep Hyp |
| 3 | Hitsujibungaku |
| 3 | King Gnu |
| 3 | Man with a Mission |
| 3 | Mr. Children |
| 3 | Official Hige Dandism |
| 3 | Perfume |
| 3 | Radwimps |
| 3 | Yoasobi |
| 3 | Zutto Mayonaka de Ii no ni. |

== Hall of Fame ==
List of artists in the CD Shop Awards Hall of Fame
| Year | Artist | New release (Note: Album released in the year of the artist's addition to the Hall of Fame) | Previous wins | Ref. |
|---|---|---|---|---|
| 2025 | Kenshi Yonezu | Lost Corner | Bootleg (2018) and Stray Sheep (2021) | |
| 2025 | Official Hige Dandism | Rejoice | Traveler (2020) and Editorial (2022) | |
| 2026 | Fujii Kaze | Prema | Help Ever Hurt Never (2021) and Love All Serve All (2023) | |
| 2026 | Gen Hoshino | Gen | Yellow Dancer (2016) and Pop Virus (2019) | |
