= The Last Blossom =

2025 Japanese animated film

- Theatrical release poster
- Directed by: Baku Kinoshita
- Written by: Kazuya Konomoto
- Starring: Kaoru Kobayashi; Junki Tozuka; Hikari Mitsushima; Yoshiko Miyazaki; Pierre Taki
- Music by: Cero; Shōhei Takagi; Tsubasa Hashimoto; Yū Arauchi
- Production company: CLAP
- Distributed by: Pony Canyon
- Release date: October 10, 2025 (Japan)
- Running time: 91 minutes
- Country: Japan
- Language: Japanese
- Box office: $80,436

The Last Blossom (Japanese: ホウセンカ, Hepburn: Housenka) is a 2025 Japanese animated film. Produced by CLAP and distributed by Pony Canyon, the film is directed by Baku Kinoshita and written by Kazuya Konomoto, with music composed by Cero, Shōhei Takagi, Tsubasa Hashimoto, and Yū Arauchi. The film debuted in Japanese theaters in October 2025.

== Voice cast ==
Character	Japanese
Akutsu	Kaoru Kobayashi (present), Junki Tozuka (past)
Nana Nagata	Hikari Mitsushima (past), Yoshiko Miyazaki (present)
Hōsenka Flower	Pierre Taki
Hayashida	Hideaki Murata (Toro Salmon)
Tsutsumi	Hiroki Yasumoto
Wakamatsu	Soma Saito
Konishi	Kōta Nakayama
Kensuke	Natsuki Hanae

== Plot ==
In the present day, Minoru Akutsu, a 73-year-old inmate serving a life sentence, lies dying alone in his prison cell. He is visited by an anthropomorphic balsam flower, growing in a can. The flower mocks Akutsu for having lived a "pathetic" life, while Akutsu insists that he is still capable of achieving a "big comeback." The flower explains that only newborn children and people nearing death can hear its voice. Their conversation prompts Akutsu to recall the events that led to his imprisonment.

In 1987, Akutsu is a low-ranking yakuza member living in a modest seaside apartment arranged for him by his sworn brother, Tsutsumi. He shares the apartment with Nana Nagata and her newborn son, Kensuke. Although Akutsu is not Kensuke's biological father, the three gradually develop a close family-like relationship. Akutsu is deeply attached to Nana and Kensuke but is emotionally reserved and struggles to express his feelings. Nana eventually asks him to marry her, but Akutsu refuses, believing that making her part of a yakuza family would endanger her and Kensuke.

As Japan's economy grows, Akutsu becomes successful in real-estate speculation and begins earning large amounts of money. His newfound wealth causes him to become increasingly absorbed in a hedonistic lifestyle, and he begins neglecting Nana and Kensuke, who is beginning to fall ill. Akutsu remains devoted to providing for them. When Kensuke is diagnosed with dilated cardiomyopathy and requires a lifesaving transplant overseas in America, Akutsu desperately needs a large sum of money to pay for the operation.

Akutsu turns to Tsutsumi for help, who proposes stealing 300 million yen from their yakuza organization's safe. The scheme also involves eliminating Wakamatsu, a younger member who has become increasingly influential within the organization. Akutsu agrees, believing that obtaining the money is the only way to save Kensuke. During the robbery, Tsutsumi kills Wakamatsu, and Akutsu is ultimately arrested and takes responsibility for the crime. Kensuke's heart transplant succeeds, but Akutsu receives a life sentence for the robbery and murder. He is denied parole twice due to having no documented family to return home to.

While in prison, Akutsu is unable to meet with Nana and Kensuke because he has no legal familial relationship with them. He is permitted to send letters to Nana for a limited period, but the letters are inspected by prison officials and suspicious passages are blacked out. Akutsu deliberately uses the censorship to his advantage. Because of his extraordinary ability to visualize and draw maps, he designs the letters so that the censored sections form clues to the location of money he secretly withheld from the robbery.

Akutsu keeps approximately 70 million yen hidden from Tsutsumi. His decision to conceal the money is part of a larger plan to keep Tsutsumi from finding Nana and Kensuke and to ensure that they will have financial security after his imprisonment. Over the following decades, Akutsu remains incarcerated while Nana raises Kensuke, who survives his transplant and eventually grows into an adult.

More than 30 years later, an elderly Nana returns to the apartment where she once lived with Akutsu after being discharged from the hospital where she too once heard a balsam flower speak to her. With the help of the clues contained in his old letters, she realizes that they form a map leading to the hidden money. Nana and Kensuke eventually locate the 70 million yen, while Tsutsumi, having discovered that Akutsu left something behind, attempts to find it by ransacking the apartment, but fails.

Alongside the money, Nana discovers a portrait of herself drawn by Akutsu. Hidden within the drawing is a message in which Akutsu finally expresses the words he had been unable to say during their life together: "I love you." Nana realizes that Akutsu's "big comeback" was not about obtaining money, but about ensuring that she and Kensuke could escape the yakuza world and live safely after his imprisonment.

Back in prison, Akutsu learns from the balsam flower that Nana and Kensuke are safe and that his plan has succeeded. Having finally accomplished what he had spent decades preparing, Akutsu accepts that his life is coming to an end. He dies peacefully in his cell, while the balsam flower remains beside him.

== Production ==
The film was announced by the Annecy International Animation Film Festival on May 24, 2024. It is produced by CLAP and directed by Baku Kinoshita, with Kazuya Konomoto writing the screenplay, both of them worked together on Odd Taxi. Kinoshita is designing the characters, and Cero, Shōhei Takagi, Tsubasa Hashimoto and Yū Arauchi are composing the music. Kaoru Kobayashi, Junki Tozuka, Hikari Mitsushima, Yoshiko Miyazaki, and Pierre Taki were cast in the lead roles. The film's theme song is "Moving Still Life" performed by Cero.

=== Release ===
The film was distributed by Pony Canyon, who released the film in theaters on October 10, 2025. Anime Limited and Plaion Pictures licensed the film for distribution in the UK, Ireland, France, Germany, Australia, and Switzerland. The film was released in Australia through Sugoi Co distributing it on April 23, 2026. The film was theatrically released in North America through GKIDS distributing the film on August 30, 2026.
