= Gusare =

Studio album by Zutomayo
- Released: February 10, 2021
- Genres: J-pop; pop rock
- Length: 57:54
- Language: Japanese
- Label: EMI
- Producers: Kōhei Matsumoto; 100kaiŌto; Singo Kubota

Zutomayo chronology
| Hogarakana Hifutote Fufuku (2020) | Gusare (2021) | Nobi Shigusa Korite Itomagoi (2022) |

Singles from Gusare
- 1. "Obenkyō Shitoiteyo" Released: May 15, 2020; 2. "Darken" Released: November 3, 2020; 3. "Hunch Gray" Released: November 27, 2020; 4. "Can't Be Right" Released: December 17, 2020

Alternative cover
- Vinyl edition cover

Gusare (ぐされ) is the second studio album by Japanese rock group Zutomayo, released on February 10, 2021, through EMI Records.

The album became the group's best-selling release and is their only album to be certified gold by the Recording Industry Association of Japan (RIAJ). It was preceded by the EP Hogarakana Hifutote Fufuku (朗らかな皮膚とて不服), which achieved the highest first-week sales among the group's mini albums.

Four singles were released prior to the album. The lead single, "Obenkyō Shitoiteyo", became a breakthrough release that increased the band's popularity among international audiences, while the final single, "Can't Be Right", further strengthened their popularity and became one of their biggest hits in Japan.

== Background ==
In 2019, Japanese rock group Zutomayo released their debut album Hisohiso Banashi (潜潜話). The album's lead single, their debut song "Byōshinwo Kamu", became a sleeper hit, reaching a new peak on the charts in May 2020. That same month, the group released their new single "Obenkyō Shitoiteyo", their first single following the release of their debut album.

Not long before this, on March 6 an acoustic version of "Saturn" from Tadashii Itsuwarikarano Kishō (正しい偽りからの起床) was released on YouTube. It was later included in limited edition of their third EP, Hogarakana Hifutote Fufuku (朗らかな皮膚とて不服), released later that year. The EP included "Obenkyō Shitoiteyo" and two promotional singles: "Milabo" and "Fastening". All three songs were later included on their second album, Gusare.

== Release and promotion ==
On May 6, 2020, Zutomayo announced their first tie-in song. The song's title was revealed as "Darken" ("暗く黒く"). (Note: Only Japanese title was revealed in May. Official English title "Darken" was revealed later, closer to the single's release.), and it was used as the theme song for the live-action film The Night Beyond the Tricornered Window.

A paid live performance, "NIWA TO NIRA", was held the day after the release of Hogarakana Hifutote Fufuku. A recording of the performance was later included as a bonus feature on a separate Blu-Ray in the limited edition of the physical release of Gusare.

On October 9, the album's title and release date were announced. On the same day, the group announced their first tour, "Yaki Yaki Yankee Tour (Grilled and Smoked Edition)". Less than a month later, "Darken" was officially released, and pre-orders for the album opened three days afterward.

By the end of the year, two additional singles accompanied by music videos were released: "Hunch Gray" and "Can't Be Right". The latter was featured in the film The Promised Neverland and gained significant attention. In January 2021, The Night Beyond the Tricornered Window was released, leading to the release of the album's final promotional single, "Hypersomnia", as well as the music video for "Darken". On January 30, ACA-Ne made her first television appearance as a guest on NHK's program "Songs".

The album was released on February 10, 2021. Five bonus CDs were available with purchases of the album at select retailers. The CD sleeves were designed to resemble diskettes and contained chiptune remixes of Zutomayo's songs. The "Kyo" Edition also included an action figure of the main character from the "Obenkyō Shitoiteyo" music video. The release was accompanied by the music video for "One's Mind".

Two days later, an appearance on The First Take was announced. ACA-Ne performed "Byōshinwo Kamu" and "Can't Be Right". Both performances were released on streaming services in March.

== Track listing ==
All tracks are written by ACA-Ne.

Gusare track listing
| No. | Title | Arrangement | Length |
|---|---|---|---|
| 1. | "One's Mind" (胸の煙) | 100kaiŌto | 4:09 |
| 2. | "Can't Be Right" (正しくなれない) | 100kaiŌto; Singo Kubota | 4:00 |
| 3. | "Obenkyō Shitoiteyo" (お勉強しといてよ) | 100kaiŌto; Tatsuya Yano | 4:39 |
| 4. | "Hunch Gray" (勘ぐれい) | 100kaiŌto | 4:09 |
| 5. | "Have A" (はゔぁ) | 100kaiŌto | 3:38 |
| 6. | "Engine Oil" (機械油) | 100kaiŌto; Open Reel Ensemble | 3:16 |
| 7. | "Darken" (暗く黒く) | 100kaiŌto | 4:09 |
| 8. | "Milabo" | 100kaiŌto; Takayuki Ishikura | 4:29 |
| 9. | "Loneliness" (ろんりねす) | Kenichiro Nishihara; Yusuke Nakamura | 4:53 |
| 10. | "Crop" (繰り返す収穫) | Singo Kubota | 3:54 |
| 11. | "Hypersomnia" (過眠) | 100kaiŌto | 4:13 |
| 12. | "Fastening" (低血ボルト) | Akihiro Sekiguchi; Jun Murayama; Ryo Deguchi; Art Neco | 3:35 |
| 13. | "Inner Heart" (奥底に眠るルーツ) | 100kaiŌto | 4:23 |
| 14. | "Darken" (Twin Piano Live Ver.) (bonus track) | Jun Murayama; Nao Nishimura | 4:27 |
| Total length: | | | 57:54 |

"Kyo" Limited Deluxe Edition CD2 track listing
| No. | Title | Length |
|---|---|---|
| 1. | "One's Mind" (Instrumental) | 4:09 |
| 2. | "Can't Be Right" (Instrumental) | 4:00 |
| 3. | "Obenkyō Shitoiteyo" (Instrumental) | 4:39 |
| 4. | "Hunch Gray" (Instrumental) | 4:09 |
| 5. | "Have A" (Instrumental) | 3:38 |
| 6. | "Engine Oil" (Instrumental) | 3:16 |
| 7. | "Darken" (Instrumental) | 4:09 |
| 8. | "Milabo" (Instrumental) | 4:29 |
| 9. | "Loneliness" (Instrumental) | 4:53 |
| 10. | "Crop" (Instrumental) | 3:54 |
| 11. | "Hypersomnia" (Instrumental) | 4:13 |
| 12. | "Fastening" (Instrumental) | 3:35 |
| 13. | "Inner Heart" (Instrumental) | 4:23 |
| Total length: | | 1:51:21 |

Limited Edition Blu-Ray track listing
| No. | Title | Length |
|---|---|---|
| 1. | "Mabushii DNA Dake" (Online Live "NIWA TO NIRA" 2020.8.6) |
| 2. | "Obenkyō Shitoiteyo" (Online Live "NIWA TO NIRA" 2020.8.6) |
| 3. | "Humanoid" (Online Live "NIWA TO NIRA" 2020.8.6) |
| 4. | "Marine Blue Garden" (Online Live "NIWA TO NIRA" 2020.8.6) |
| 5. | "Kimigaite Mizuninaru" (Online Live "NIWA TO NIRA" 2020.8.6) |
| 6. | "Samayoi Yoi Ondo" (Online Live "NIWA TO NIRA" 2020.8.6) |
| 7. | "Milabo" (Online Live "NIWA TO NIRA" 2020.8.6) |
| 8. | "Byōshinwo Kamu" (Online Live "NIWA TO NIRA" 2020.8.6) |
| 9. | "Fastening" (Online Live "NIWA TO NIRA" 2020.8.6) |
| 10. | "Minority Myakuraku" (Online Live "NIWA TO NIRA" 2020.8.6) |
| 11. | "Seigi" (Online Live "NIWA TO NIRA" 2020.8.6) |
| 12. | "Darken" (Online Live "NIWA TO NIRA" 2020.8.6) |
| 13. | "ACA-Ne ASMR Journey: Waterfall and Bonfire Edition" (Bonus Footage) |

Animate exclusive bonus CD
| No. | Title | Length |
|---|---|---|
| 1. | "Can't Be Right (正しくなれない)" (8bit ver.) |
| 2. | "Ham" (8bit ver.) |

Amazon exclusive bonus CD
| No. | Title | Length |
|---|---|---|
| 1. | "Obenkyō Shitoiteyo (お勉強しといてよ)" (8bit ver.) |
| 2. | "Milabo" (8bit ver.) |

Tower Records exclusive bonus CD
| No. | Title | Length |
|---|---|---|
| 1. | "Darken (暗く黒く)" (8bit ver.) |
| 2. | "Kan Saete Kuyashiiwa (勘冴えて悔しいわ)" (8bit ver.) |

Tsutaya Records exclusive bonus CD
| No. | Title | Length |
|---|---|---|
| 1. | "Byōshinwo Kamu (秒針を噛む)" (8bit ver.) |
| 2. | "Uni To Kuri (雲丹と栗)" (8bit ver.) |

Zutomayo Mart exclusive bonus CD
| No. | Title | Length |
|---|---|---|
| 1. | "Nōriueno Cracker (脳裏上のクラッカー)" (8bit ver.) |
| 2. | "Hunch Gray (勘ぐれい)" (8bit ver.) |

Notes

- "Milabo", named in English, is stylized in uppercase.

== Personnel ==
Musicians

- ACA-Ne – vocals
- Yoshihiro Kawamura – drums (1, 2, 4, 6, 7, 9, 10, 12)
- Takashi Adachi – bass guitar (1, 6)
- Jun Murayama – piano (1, 12, 14), keyboards (7)
- Yoshida Uchuu Strings – strings (1)
- Sasaki Takayuki – guitar (1, 2, 4, 6, 7)
- 100kaiŌto – bass guitar (1), guitar (5)
- Ryosuke Nikamoto – bass guitar (2–4, 7, 8, 10, 12, 13)
- Nao Nishimura – piano (2, 3, 8, 12, 14)
- Yu Manabe Strings – strings (2, 3, 7, 11)
- Yasushi Fukumori – drums (3, 8)
- Sho Ogawa – guitar (3, 8)
- Yuki Kishida – keyboards (4), piano (5)
- Keisuke Torigoe – double bass (5)
- Hiroomi Shitara – guitar (5, 13)
- Norihide Saji – drums (5)
- Yutaka Oyama – strings (6)
- Ei Wada – magnetic tape, harp (6)
- Masaru Yoshida – magnetic tape (6)
- Wasei Suma – violin (8), viola (8)
- Yusuke Nakamura – keyboards (9)
- Kenichiro Nishihara – keyboards (9)
- Singo Kubota – guitar (10)
- Norihide Saji – drums (13)

Technical

- Toru Matake – mixing, recording engineering
- Takeo Kira – mastering
- Kōhei Matsumoto – producing

== Charts ==
=== Weekly charts ===
Weekly chart performance for Gusare
| Chart (2021) | Peak position |
|---|---|
| Japanese Albums (Oricon) | 2 |
| Japanese Combined Albums (Oricon) | 2 |
| Japanese Digital Albums (Oricon) | 2 |
| Japanese Hot Albums (Billboard Japan) | 2 |
| Japanese Download Albums (Billboard Japan) | 2 |

=== Monthly charts ===
Monthly chart performance for Gusare
| Chart (2021) | Position |
|---|---|
| Japanese Albums (Oricon) | 5 |

=== Year-end charts ===
Year-end chart performance for Gusare
| Chart (2021) | Position |
|---|---|
| Japanese Albums (Oricon) | 59 |
| Japanese Hot Albums (Billboard Japan) | 42 |

== Certifications ==
Certifications for Gusare
| Region | Certification | Certified units/sales |
|---|---|---|
| Japan (RIAJ) | Gold | 100,000^{^} |
^{^} Shipments figures based on certification alone.

== Release history ==
Release history and formats for Gusare
| Region | Date | Format(s) | Version | Label | Ref. |
|---|---|---|---|---|---|
| Various | February 10, 2021 | Digital download; streaming | Regular | EMI; Universal Japan | |
| Japan | February 10, 2021 | CD | Regular | EMI; Universal Japan | |
| Japan | February 10, 2021 | CD | "Kyo" Limited Deluxe Edition | EMI; Universal Japan | |
| Japan | February 10, 2021 | CD | w/ Blu-ray, Limited Edition | EMI; Universal Japan | |
| Japan | June 16, 2021 | Vinyl | Regular | EMI; Universal Japan | |
| Japan | November 12, 2025 | Vinyl | Regular | EMI; Universal Japan | |
