= Naoto Inti Raymi =

Naoto inti raymi
- Born: Naoto Nakamura (中村 直人); August 15, 1979 (age 47)
- Origin: Mie Prefecture
- Genres: J-Pop, funk, Latin
- Occupations: Singer-songwriter, composer, actor, novelist, radio dj, amateur soccer player
- Years active: 1998–present
- Labels: Sony (2001–2002); Rubicon River Entertainment (2005–2006); Universal Music Japan (2010–present)
- Website: nananaoto.com

Naoto Nakamura (中村 直人, Nakamura Naoto), better known by his stage name Naoto Inti Raymi (ナオト・インティライミ, Naoto Intiraymi), is a Japanese singer-songwriter and composer. He was born in Mie Prefecture in Japan and later grew up in Chiba Prefecture. For two years from 2001, he used his given name Naoto as his stage name. In 2001, while he was still attending Chuo University, Naoto debuted into the major music scene with his single "Growing up!!" released by Sony Music Records. Then he kept releasing the total three singles and one album before graduating from his university in 2002.

After the graduation, he went on to "the trip around the world through 28 countries", which took 515 days over two years from 2003 to 2004. Upon his return home, he began his professional music career with his new stage name, Naoto Inti Raymi meaning "the festival of the sun" in Quechuan language. Inti means the sun, while Raymi means festival.

In 2001, From Universal Sigma, he released "Carnival?", the first single with a major label as Naoto Inti Raymi. The following hit singles "TAKARAMONO – KONO KOEGA NAKUNARUMADE – “ in 2010 and “IMANO KIMIWO WASURENAI" in 2011 both were downloaded more than one million times at multiple music download sites.

In 2012, he was invited to perform at the most prestigious music TV show in Japan, KOUHAKU UTA GASSEN. After that, he continued releasing singles and albums while he toured around the nation for concerts. In 2015, his one-man show at KYOCERA DOME OSAKA successfully drew an audience of 40,000 to celebrate his 5th anniversary year of his career with a major record label.

Not just a singer-songwriter, his wide range of musical talents is also allowing himself to actively write songs for the other artists. Besides in the music industry, he began his career in acting as well when he appeared in the 2015 movie "KAMISAMA WA BALINI IRU". Then he played the lead role of the musical "DNA-SHARAKU" in 2016 and appeared in the TV drama series "KOUNODORI" in 2017.

Currently, he is working on making music in other languages besides Japanese with the intention of making a world tour

"Inti Raymi" is Quechuan (Incan language) for "festival of the sun."

== Life and career ==
=== 1979–2000 ===
In 1993, when he was 14 years old in junior high school, Naoto started learning how to play the guitar and writing songs. In 1995, he moved on to high school and started making songs more seriously and self-produced his own album with the songs he had made. He also began playing his songs on the streets to improve his performing skills. Those street performances helped him create his signature style of getting his audience more actively involved in the live experience.

In 1999, while he was a student at Chuo University, he went on his first international trip to New York City. Although he was just a sightseeing tourist, he was called up onto the stage at Apollo Theater in Harlem. He grabbed the microphone and successfully entertained the audience, improvising with the band there. The standing ovation he received there and the experience of exciting people with his music even with the language barrier instilled in him the dream of being a world-class performer.

=== 2001–2004 "Naoto" Period ===
In 2001, he signed a record deal with Sony Music Records and made a debut onto the scene. In June 2002, he released the album "Funk Renaissance", however it did not enjoy any hit singles out of it. After releasing another single in September that year, he had to stop making new songs and the record deal was terminated. Disappointed, he took time off to regroup himself. Remembering his dream of going on to a world tour, which the Apollo Theater experience brought to him, he decided to travel around the world to grow as a person and experience the different styles of music worldwide. In August 2003, his journey began. Before he came back to Japan in December that year, he had visited 28 countries, realizing the world can offer much more than what he had seen on TV. In particular, the Middle Eastern countries and the warmth of the people there gave him a totally new perspective on his career goal, which is to make the world a more peaceful place with his music. He was given an opportunity to perform in front of the late Yasser Arafat, who was then the Chairman of the Palestine Liberation Organization, and he sang "UE O MUITE ARUKOU", one of the most popular Japanese pop songs in the world. The other notable events during the journey included a tour with a local band in Miami, Florida, United States and almost signing a professional football player contract with a football club in Peru. He surely displayed his wide range of potential as a person and an artist at the places he visited, and he expanded his horizon at the same time.

=== 2005–2009 ===
After coming back from his journey around the world, he came up with his new stage name of Naoto Inti Raymi to restart his music career in Japan, with inspiration from his travel experience at Salar de Uyuni in Bolivia. In Quechuan language, one of the indigenous languages of the Inca Empire, "Inti" means the sun and "Raymi" means festival. While establishing his foundation as a musician by countless performances on the streets and in live houses, he had the opportunity to meet Kazutoshi Sakurai, the vocalist of Mr. Children, one of the most popular rock bands in Japan. Naoto started joining Mr. Children’s concerts as a back chorus in 2008, and while doing that, he signed a contract with OORONG-SHA as a solo artist. Along with his commitment with Mr. Children, he kept performing solo at his own concerts and polishing his character and music.

=== 2010– ===
He made the third debut in his career with "Carnival?" in April 2010. Only eight months after that, he put on a successful solo concert at Nippon Budoukan, the mecca concert hall where all young Japanese artists dream of performing. The record releases were on a high pace in that year; the single "TAKARAMONO -KONO KOE GA NAKUNARUMADE-" one month after the debut in April, the first album "Shall we travel??" in July, and another single "ARITTAKE NO Love Song" in September. He also kept on visiting cities to perform, gradually at larger and larger venues and attracting bigger audiences and attention from the public accordingly. And his efforts came into fruition at the end of year 2012 as the appearance at Japan's annual New Year's Eve television music show "NHK KOUHAKU UTAGASSEN". After many more songs released and growth as a singer-songwriter, Naoto performed at KYOSERA Dome (Osaka) in 2015 in front of 40,000 fans. Then he went on to take his talents to other artistic fields such as acting, taking the lead role at the musical "DNA-SHARAKU" in 2016. In 2017, he again traveled around the world to visit 19 countries and enrich his musical variety even further. The highlights of the following year were tours to all the 47 prefectures in Japan all by himself, producing a song for Masashi Sada, a legendary figure in Japanese pop music, writing a song to BOYS AND MEN who are a rising-star pop group performing mainly in Japan's region. His seventh album, his latest, titled as "7" was released on December 5, 2018, featuring a song he co-wrote with Mr. Children’s Kazutoshi Sakurai.

His performances are no longer confined to Japan. To realize his dream of a world tour, he has collaborated with non-Japanese songwriters and created songs in other languages.

== Discography ==
=== Albums ===
| Year | Details | Oricon Albums Chart | Reported sales |
|---|---|---|---|
| 2002 | Funk Renaissance: As Naoto; Released: June 19, 2002; Label: Sony Music Japan (SRCL-5367); Formats: CD | — | — |
| 2010 | Shall We Travel??: Released: July 7, 2010; Label: Universal Music Japan (UMCK-1360); Formats: CD, digital download | 16 | 28,000 |
| 2011 | Adventure: Released: May 11, 2011; Label: Universal Music Japan; Formats: CD, digital download | 3 | 78,000 |
| 2012 | Kazauta Caravan: Released: April 18, 2012; Label: Universal Music Japan; Formats: CD, digital download | 1 | |
| 2013 | Nice Catch the Moment!: Released: May 15, 2013; Label: Universal Music Japan; Formats: CD, digital download | — | — |
| 2013 | Tabi uta diary: Released: September 25, 2013; Label: Universal Music Japan; Formats: CD, digital download | — | — |
| 2014 | Viva The World: Released: October 1, 2014; Label: Universal Music Japan; Formats: CD, digital download | — | — |
| 2015 | The Best!: Released: January 10, 2015; Label: Universal Music Japan; Formats: CD, digital download | — | — |
| 2016 | Six Sense: Released: September 14, 2016; Label: Universal Music Japan; Formats: CD, digital download | — | — |
| 2017 | Tabi-uta diary 2: Released: November 22, 2017; Label: Universal Music Japan; Formats: CD, digital download | — | — |
| 2018 | 7: Released: December 12, 2018; Label: Universal Music Japan; Formats: CD, digital download | — | — |
| 2026 | Reboot: Released: February 4, 2026; Label: Universal Music Japan; Formats: CD, digital download | 12 | 4,263 |

=== Extended plays ===
| Year | Album Information | Oricon Albums Chart | Reported sales |
|---|---|---|---|
| 2009 | Ultra C (ウルトラＣ, Urutora Shī): Released: May 13, 2009; Independently released at Tower Records (INTI-00002); Re-released under Universal (POCS-22006) on July 7, 2010; Formats: CD, digital download | 85 | 1,800 |

=== Singles ===
| Release | Title | Notes | Chart positions | | | Oricon sales | Album |
| Release | Title | Notes | Oricon Singles Charts | Billboard Japan Hot 100* | RIAJ digital tracks* | Oricon sales | Album |
|---|---|---|---|---|---|---|---|
| 2001 | "Growing Up!!" | As Naoto | — | — | — | — | Funk Renaissance |
| 2002 | "High" | As Naoto | — | — | — | — | Funk Renaissance |
| 2002 | "Ano Subarashii Ai o Mō Ichido" (あの素晴らしい愛をもう一度; "That Wonderful Love Once More") | As Naoto, Kazuhiko Katō/Osamu Kitayama cover | — | — | — | — | What's Cover? (compilation album) |
| 2005 | "Itareri Tsukuseri" (イタレリ ツクセリ; "Very Polite") | Independent, released only at Shinseido | — | — | — | — | — |
| 2006 | "Sakura Komachi" (桜小町; "Little Cherry Blossom Town") | Independent | — | — | — | — | — |
| 2010 | "Carnival?" (カーニバる?; "Carnivalling?") | | 34 | 23 | — | 3,800 | Shall We Travel?? |
| 2010 | "Takaramono (Kono Koe ga Naku Naru Made)" (タカラモノ～この声がなくなるまで～; "Precious Thing (Until This Voice Fades)") | Certified platinum for full-length cellphone downloads, gold for PC downloads | 15 | 3 | 5 | 16,000 | Shall We Travel?? |
| 2010 | "Aritakke no Love Song" (ありったけのLove Song; "Song with All My Love") | Certified gold for full-length cellphone downloads | 23 | 6 | 8 | 5,000 | Adventure/The Best! |
| 2010 | "Adventure" | Digital single | — | — | 66 | — | Adventure |
| 2011 | "Ima no Kimi o Wasurenai" (今のキミを忘れない; "Won't Forget You in this Moment") | Certified platinum for full-length cellphone downloads, gold for PC downloads | 26 | 5 | 1 | 11,000 | Adventure/The Best! |
| 2011 | "Brave" | | 13 | 2 | 5 | 6,700 | Adventure/The Best! |
| 2011 | "Hello" | | TBA | 34 | 13 | — | Kazauta Caravan/The Best! |
| 2012 | "Kimi ni Aitakatta" (君に逢いたかった) | — | — | — | — | — | Kazauta Caravan/The Best! |
| 2012 | "Ai Shiteta" (愛してた) | — | — | — | — | — | Kazauta Caravan/The Best! |
| 2012 | "Naite Tatte" (ナイテタッテ) | — | — | — | — | — | Nice Catch the Moment!/The Best! |
| 2012 | "Shiawase ni Naru Tameni" (しあわせになるために) | — | — | — | — | — | Nice Catch the Moment!/The Best! |
| 2013 | "Koisuru Kisetsu" (恋する季節) | — | — | — | — | — | Nice Catch the Moment!/The Best! |
| 2013 | "Tegami" (手紙) | — | — | — | — | — | Viva the World!/The Best! |
| 2014 | "The World Is Ours!" | — | — | — | — | — | Viva the World!/The Best! |
| 2014 | "Life" | — | — | — | — | — | Viva the World!/The Best! |
| 2015 | "Itsuka kitto" (いつかきっと) | — | — | — | — | — | The Best!/Six Sense |
| 2016 | "Mirai He" (未来へ) | — | — | — | — | — | Six Sense |
| 2016 | "Together" | — | — | — | — | — | Six Sense |
| 2016 | "Overflows〜Kotoba ni dekinakute〜" (〜言葉にできなくて〜) | — | — | — | — | — | Six Sense |
| 2016 | "Yume no arika" (夢のありか) | — | — | — | — | — | 7 |
| 2018 | "Hibiscus" | — | — | — | — | — | 7 |
| 2018 | "Start to Rain" | — | — | — | — | — | 7 |
| 2019 | "Mangetsu no Yoru" (まんげつの夜) | — | 15 | — | — | 6,557 | TBA |
| 2019 | "El Japonés" (with Joey Montana) | As Naoto | — | — | — | — | — |

=== Other charted songs ===
| Release | Title | Chart positions | | Album |
| Release | Title | Billboard Japan Hot 100 | RIAJ digital tracks | Album |
|---|---|---|---|---|
| 2009 | "Yume Hanabi" (夢花火; "Dream Fireworks") | — | 28 | Ultra C |
| 2010 | "Kimi Life" (キミライフ; "Your Life") | 61 | 28 | Shall We Travel?? |

=== Other appearances ===
| Release | Artist | Title | Notes | Album |
|---|---|---|---|---|
| 2006 | Sunplaza Nakano & Papparā Kawai | "Glory of Reysol" | Featured vocals | "Taiyō wa Moeteiru: Kashi wa Reysol no Uta" (single) |
| 2007 | Naoto Inti Raymi | "Viva! Toriko" (ビバ！トリコ) | | Respect to Ronaldinho (EP) |

== Bibliography ==
- Sekai yo Odore: Utatte Kette! Ni Jū Hakka Kuni Chinyū Nikki (世界よ踊れ 歌って蹴って!28ヶ国珍遊日記, World, Dance: Singing, Kicking! A Rare Travel Journal to 28 Countries), 2006, ISBN 978-4-344-01227-1
