= Kurayamisaka =

Japanese rock band

- Kurayamisaka performing at Sweet Love Shower in Yamanakako, Yamanashi, Japan, in 2026

Background information
- Origin: Tokyo, Japan
- Genres: Alternative rock; shoegaze
- Years active: 2022–present
- Label: Tomoran
- Members: Shotaro Shimizu; Sachi Naito; Rinpei Asami; Yosuke Hotta; Ryuji Fukuda
- Website: kurayamisaka.com

Kurayamisaka (styled in all lower case; pronounced as Kurayamizaka) is a rock band from Tokyo, Japan, formed in 2022 and consisting of guitarist and songwriter Shotaro Shimizu, vocalist Sachi Naito, bassist Rinpei Asami, drummer Yosuke Hotta, and guitarist Ryuji Fukuda.

== History ==
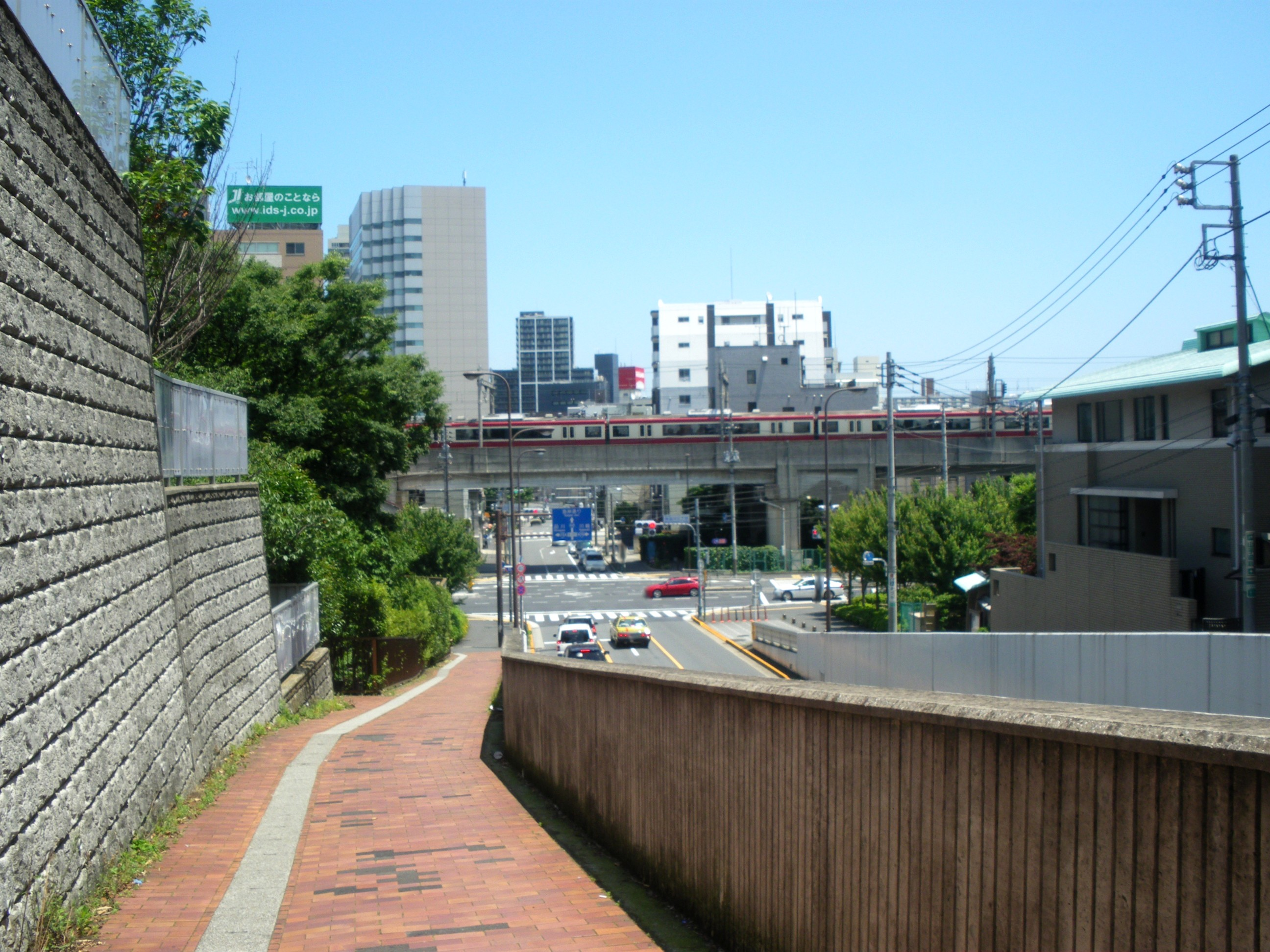
Kyū-Sendaizaka, otherwise known as Kurayamizaka, a sloped street in Tokyo after which the band is named

Kurayamisaka was formed in the Ōi neighborhood of Shinagawa, Tokyo, Japan, in 2022. The formation was the initiative of guitarist and songwriter Shotaro Shimizu, who had moved to Tokyo from his rural home town in Agui, Aichi, for university in 2019. He first invited former university classmate and vocalist Sachi Naito, with whom he had played in a J-pop-inspired band that disbanded upon their graduation. Shimizu also recruited bassist Rinpei Asami, who in turned introduced his childhood friend and drummer Yosuke Hotta; impressed with a video of his skills, Shimizu invited Hotta to the band over Line. Guitarist Ryuji Fukuda had previously played with Shimizu and Naito in university; struggling to form a band of his own, he asked Shimizu to join Kurayamisaka when he heard about the band on X/Twitter, to which he was accepted, forming the five-member line-up. They named themselves after Kyū-Sendaizaka (旧仙台坂), otherwise known as Kurayamizaka (くらやみ坂; lit. 'Darkness Slope'), a sloped street in Tokyo which Shimizu regularly passed on his way to work. He liked the name and chose it for the band.

After the singles "Farewell" in March and "Seasons" in August, Kurayamisaka released their debut EP, Kimi wo Omotte Iru (lit. 'Thinking of You'), a concept album about two women about to depart, on October 2, 2022. Its underground success afforded the band opportunites to play sold out shows at live houses and to appear at the Rookie-A-Go-Go stage of the Fuji Rock Festival in 2024. Subsequently, they were included as the only Japanese act on NME's list of "100 Essential Emerging Artists for 2025".

The band released their debut album, Kurayamisaka yori Ai wo Komete (lit. 'With Love from Kurayamisaka'), on September 10, 2025. The album immediately received positive reviews from critics. It won the Grand Prix at the CD Shop Awards in the Blue category, awarded to the best album of the year by a newcoming artist, and Mikiki's Yuji Tayama declared it "undeniably a masterpiece worthy of being ranked among the best of the year". Ryōka Naruse for Rockin'On Japan regarded the album as a nostalgia-inducing abstract story about an unspecified character, who questions their future with another person.

== Musical style ==
Are we alternative? Are we shoegaze? Are we a rock band? It's not for us to decide. But it's also not for [others] to decide. It's confusing. [...] I'm sure even (shoegaze legends) My Bloody Valentine didn't know they were shoegaze at the time.

— Shotaro Shimizu, The Japan Times (October 2025)

The Japan Times's Patrick St. Michel described the sound of Kurayamisaka yori Ai wo Komete as "loud, distortion-laden guitar rock". Despite its positive reception from critics, he also wrote that the album was considered "derivative and emotionally hollow" by some listeners, who questioned its classification as shoegaze. In their "100 Essential Emerging Artists" list, NME described the band: "Keeping the flag running high for the country's long-celebrated [shoegaze] scene, Tokyo up-and-comers Kurayamisaka marry the melodic sensibilities of early 2000s J-rock with walls of majestic sludge ('Cinema Paradiso') and blood-pumping grooves ('Curtain Call'). They make music that's euphoric, cinematic and romantic all at the same time." Yūsuke Tsuruta for The Yomiuri Shimbun identified the key component of the band's style as the combination of loud guitars with Naito's "transient, heartaching" vocals — "blending mismatched elements for a strange balance" — and wrote that the band were seemingly headed towards a new era of Japanese alternative music.

Outside of Kurayamisaka, Shimizu also plays in the alternative band Sedai and Asami is the bassist in Yubiori. Shimizu said: "Maybe it was common to do just one band in the past, but now it's common to have more than one outlet to express yourself. One band can be too limiting."

== Members ==
Adapted from The Japan Times and The Yomiuri Shimbun

- Shotaro Shimizu (清水正太郎) – guitar, vocals, songwriting
- Sachi Naito (内藤さち) – vocals, guitar
- Rinpei Asami (阿左美倫平) – bass
- Yosuke Hotta (堀田庸輔) – drums
- Ryuji Fukuda (フクダリュウジ) – guitar

== Discography ==
=== Studio albums ===
List of studio albums, with selected chart positions
Title	Album details	Peak chart positions	
Title	Album details	JPN Sales	JPN DL
Kurayamisaka yori Ai wo Komete	Released: September 10, 2025; Label: Tomoran	22	58

=== EPs ===
List of EPs
Title	EP details
Kimi wo Omotte Iru	Released: October 2, 2022

=== Live albums ===
List of live albums
Title	Album details
Kurayamisaka tte, Doko? #4 (Hajimete no Tandoku Kōen-hen)	Released: September 10, 2025; Bundle with the first edition to Kurayamisaka yori Ai wo Komete
Kurayamisaka tte, Doko? #6 (Kurayamisaka yori Ai wo Komete Tour) (Kawasaki Club Citta')	Released: February 25, 2026

=== Singles ===
List of singles
Title	Year	Album
"Farewell"	2022	Kimi wo Omotte Iru
"Seasons"	2022	Kimi wo Omotte Iru
"Ever Green" / "Modify Youth"	2023	Kurayamisaka yori Ai wo Komete
"Highway"	2024	Kurayamisaka yori Ai wo Komete
"Jitensha"	2024	Kurayamisaka yori Ai wo Komete
"Sekisei Inko"	2025	Kurayamisaka yori Ai wo Komete
"Sagittarius"	2026	Non-album singles
"Hikari"	2026	Non-album singles
"Summer Film"	2026	Non-album singles
