= Junki Tozuka =

Japanese actor (born 1992)

- 戸塚 純貴
- Born: July 22, 1992 (age 34); Morioka, Iwate Prefecture, Japan
- Occupation: Actor
- Years active: 2011–present
- Spouse: Unknown (m. 2026)

Junki Tozuka (戸塚 純貴, Tozuka Junki; born July 22, 1992, in Morioka, Iwate Prefecture, Japan) is a Japanese actor who is affiliated with Box Corporation. He is best known for his role as the character, Shunpei Nara, from the Kamen Rider series Kamen Rider Wizard.

== Career ==
Tozuka graduated from Morioka Central High School. At the 23rd Junon Super Boy Contest, which was held in 2010, he won the "Ideal Lover Award", and went into the entertainment industry.

In May 2011, Tozuka appeared on Gekiotoko JB raising an army performances and formed in 12 people of the same contest synchronization finalists, the same year in July he debuted in the television drama Hanazakari no Kimitachi e.

In September 2012, he appeared in Kamen Rider Wizard as Shunpei Nara.

In 2013, Tozuka starred in the film Remiges with Mika Akizuki.

== Personal life ==
Tozuka announced on August 10, 2026, via his agency, that he had married an ordinary woman.

== Filmography ==
=== Television ===
Year	Title	Role	Notes	Ref.
2011	Hanazakari no Kimitachi e	Takeshi Kudanshita		
2012	Kamen Rider Wizard	Shunpei Nara		
2016	The Brave Yoshihiko and The Seven Driven People	Ninja	Season 3, episode 1	
2020	Daddy is My Classmate	Kyosuke Negoro		
2023	Passion for Punchlines	Toshiaki Kasuga		
2024	The Tiger and Her Wings	Taichi Todoroki	Asadora	
2024	Oshi no Ko	GOA		
2025	Pray Speak What Has Happened	Rokuro Ose		
2025	A Calm Sea and Beautiful Days with You	Yoshiharu Sakai		
2026	Yamada-Todoroki Law Firm	Taichi Todoroki	Lead role; single episode drama	
2026	Hakone Ekiden: Our Story	Shinji Maruta		

=== Films ===
Year	Title	Role	Notes	Ref.
2012	Kamen Rider × Kamen Rider Wizard & Fourze: Movie War Ultimatum	Shunpei Nara		
2013	Kamen Rider × Super Sentai × Space Sheriff: Super Hero Taisen Z	Shunpei Nara		
2013	Kamen Rider Wizard in Magic Land	Shunpei Nara/Kamen Rider Mage		
2013	Kamen Rider × Kamen Rider Gaim & Wizard: The Fateful Sengoku Movie Battle	Shunpei Nara		
2013	Remiges	Kenta	Lead role	
2018	Junpei, Think Again			
2019	I Was a Secret Bitch	Funaki		
2023	The Water Flows to the Sea	Izumiya		
2023	The Innocent Game	Kenji Fujikata		
2023	Fly Me to the Saitama: From Biwa Lake with Love	Baseball club guy		
2024	In an Isolated Cottage on a Snowy Mountain	Kyosuke Amamiya		
2024	Honeko Akabane's Bodyguards	Fūta Jinrai		
2024	All About Suomi	Naotora Okkotsu		
2024	Maru	Tanaka		
2025	The Last Blossom	Minoru Akutsu in the past (voice)	Lead role	
2025	5 Centimeters per Second	Sakai		
2026	Sakamoto Days	Heisuke Mashimo		
2026	Sukiyaki	Busujima		
2026	My Crazy Feminist Girlfriend	Kippei Ike'e		
2027	The Tiger and Her Wings: The Movie	Taichi Todoroki		
