= Hisohiso Banashi =

Studio album by Zutomayo
- Released: October 30, 2019
- Genres: J-pop; pop rock
- Length: 55:54
- Language: Japanese
- Label: EMI
- Producer: Kōhei Matsumoto

Zutomayo chronology
Imawa Imade Chikaiwa Emide (2019)	Hisohiso Banashi (2019)	Hogarakana Hifutote Fufuku (2020)

Singles from Hisohiso Banashi
- 1. "Byōshinwo Kamu" Released: August 30, 2018; 2. "Nōriueno Cracker" Released: October 24, 2018; 3. "Humanoid" Released: November 7, 2018; 4. "Mabushii DNA Dake" Released: February 27, 2019; 5. "Seigi" Released: May 22, 2019; 6. "Kettobashita Mōfu" Released: October 2, 2019

Alternative cover
- Vinyl edition cover

Hisohiso Banashi ratings
Review scores
Source	Rating
Sputnikmusic	4.1/5

Hisohiso Banashi (潜潜話) is the debut studio album by Japanese rock group Zutomayo, released on October 30, 2019, through EMI Records. The album was written solely by group's soloist ACA-Ne.

Release of the album was preceded with two EPs: Tadashii Itsuwarikarano Kishō (正しい偽りからの起床) and Imawa Imade Chikaiwa Emide (今は今で誓いは笑みで), singles from which were also included in the album. In addition to these, seven new songs were included in the album. "Kettobashita Mōfu" was the first single to be released in support of the album. It was followed by the release of two promotional singles: "Konnakoto Sōdō" and "Haze Haseru Haterumade".

The album contributed to popularization of Japanese pop scene named "yakousei". The style of the scene and the album in particular is described as energetic and instrumentally dense indie pop.

== Background ==
In 2017, frontwoman of the group ACA-Ne started out as an underground singer. During this period, she performed songs that later became part of Zutomayo discography. One of them was a song titled "Dear. Mr F" which was included in Hisohiso Banashi.

On June 4, the group began its existence with the release of an animated music video for the song "Byōshinwo Kamu". YouTube became the starting point for the song's popularity: it gained 200,000 views within the first week. Three months later it was released on streaming platforms as digital limited single.

Later this year, Zutomayo released their debut EP Tadashii Itsuwarikarano Kishō, which became their first chart entry into the Billboard and Oricon charts. The EP was also nominated for the 11th CD Shop Awards.

Their second EP Imawa Imade Chikaiwa Emide was released seven months later, on June 12, 2019. This was their first release to top the Billboard Japan Hot Albums chart and Oricon Albums Chart. The first single from it, "Mabushii DNA Dake" was also the first single to debut in the Billboard Japan Hot 100. Two months later, "Byōshinwo Kamu" also debuted on Hot 100, some time after the announcement of their debut album Hisohiso Banashi.

== Release and promotion ==
The first announcement was published on August 7, 2019, on the group's social media. It was a short video showing a glitchy computer system searching the internet. Text highlighted in yellow was compiling into caption: "Full AL 潜潜話 1030" (lit. 'Full Album Hisohiso Banashi 10.30'). The cover art and alternative packages of album were revealed on September 16. Unlike two previous releases, the album had two limited grimoire editions, named after the first two letters of the Greek alphabet.

The first revealed new song from album was "Kettobashita Mōfu", the animated music video for which was released on September 26, 2019. Less than a week later, it was released as digital single on streaming platforms.

During October, two new promotional singles were also released along with music videos. "Konnakoto Sōdō" was released on October 9 and "Haze Haseru Haterumade" was released on October 17. Song "Dear Mr. F" also received a music video, that was released on October 29, a day before supposed release date. Crossfade of all the songs from album was shown on YouTube on October 23.

Album was released on streaming platforms on October 28, two days before announcend date. Soloist of group, ACA-Ne, stated on Twitter, that release date was changed. On the day of its official release, she visited some of the CD stores where the album was sold and put a hundred VHS videotapes, painted with spray paint.

== Composition ==
Hisohiso Banashi includes 13 full-length songs. Musically, it was described as energetic J-pop and upbeat funk-inclined pop-rock. It also incorporates elements of jazz pop, indie pop and hip hop in several songs.

Even though the album is not bound by an unified concept, the main theme of most of the songs lyrically is everyday life and expressing feelings for another person. Songs like "Inemuri Enseitai" and "Yasashiku Last Smile" depict a life that does not fit well into foundations. Other songs like "Kan Saete Kuyashiiwa" and "Kettobashita Mōfu" are dedicated to feeling of confusion. "Konnakoto Sōdō" is centered on a feeling of regret. "Dear. Mr F" is about the intention to put a lid on what character of the song does not want to see. Final song, "Byōshinwo Kamu", explores theme of a feeling of emptiness.

== Artwork ==
The standard cover depicts a midnight landscape. There is an orange section in the middle of the sky, reflecting the sunset. In the middle of the sky there is a white outline of one of the group's logos, which in addition to the full romanized name of the group contains a character from Zutomayo music videos: hedgehog named Uniguri-kun. Outline of logo is reflected in the river on the ground. The cover also features clip art and white doodles over the landscape. Among them there are two more logos of the group.

Six years after the album's release, in October 2025, a vinyl edition of the album with an alternative cover was announced. It was drawn by an artist named Kawasemi, who is the art director of the "Seigi" and "Kettobashita Mōfu" music videos. Main characters of them are depicted on the front of the cover. The color palette is made in brown and orange colors. The cover also features characters from other music videos for songs from the album. One of them is main character from "Kan Saete Kuyashiiwa" music video, that was released in 2021, a year and a half after album release. The rest of the characters are in the stamps, which refers to the "Seigi" music video.

== Commercial performance ==
Hisohiso Banashi peaked at number 5 on Oricon Albums Chart and Oricon Combined Albums Chart. According to Oricon, 33,724 copies were sold by the end of 2019. For Billboard Japan Hot Albums, Hisohiso Banashi debuted at number 4.

Six years later, vinyl edition of the album peaked at number 19 on Oricon Albums Chart and lasted for two weeks.

Four singles from album received a gold certification by Recording Industry Association of Japan (RIAJ). "Byōshinwo Kamu" remains the only platinum single from the album.

== Track listing ==
All tracks are written by ACA-Ne.

Hisohiso Banashi track listing
No.	Title	Arrangement	Length
1.	"Nōriueno Cracker" (脳裏上のクラッカー)	100kaiŌto	4:30
2.	"Kan Saete Kuyashiiwa" (勘冴えて悔しいわ)	Ram Seeni; 100kaiŌto	3:56
3.	"Inemuri Enseitai" (居眠り遠征隊)	Kenichiro Nishihara; Kabanagu	3:38
4.	"Haze Haseru Haterumade" (ハゼ馳せる果てるまで)	Nulut	4:04
5.	"Kettobashita Mōfu" (蹴っ飛ばした毛布)	100kaiŌto	4:26
6.	"Dear. Mr「F」"	Jun Murayama	5:26
7.	"Konnakoto Sōdō" (こんなこと騒動)	100kaiŌto	4:57
8.	"Mabushii DNA Dake" (眩しいDNAだけ)	Nulut	3:47
9.	"Humanoid" (ヒューマノイド)	Akihiro Sekiguchi; Ram Seeni; Naoki Itai	4:19
10.	"Glass to Rum Raisin" (グラスとラムレーズン)	Haruno	3:54
11.	"Seigi" (正義)	Singo Kubota	4:31
12.	"Yasashiku Last Smile" (優しくLAST SMILE)	100kaiŌto	4:05
13.	"Byōshinwo Kamu" (秒針を噛む)	Nulut	4:20
Total length:			55:54

Limited Edition α CD2 track listing
No.	Title	Length
1.	"Nōriueno Cracker" (Instrumental)	4:30
2.	"Kan Saete Kuyashiiwa" (Instrumental)	3:56
3.	"Inemuri Enseitai" (Instrumental)	3:38
4.	"Haze Haseru Haterumade" (Instrumental)	4:04
5.	"Kettobashita Mōfu" (Instrumental)	4:26
6.	"Dear. Mr「F」" (Instrumental)	5:26
7.	"Konnakoto Sōdō" (Instrumental)	4:57
8.	"Mabushii DNA Dake" (Instrumental)	3:47
9.	"Humanoid" (Instrumental)	4:19
10.	"Glass to Rum Raisin" (Instrumental)	3:54
11.	"Seigi" (Instrumental)	4:31
12.	"Yasashiku Last Smile" (Instrumental)	4:05
13.	"Byōshinwo Kamu" (Instrumental)	4:20
Total length:		1:51:48

== Personnel ==
Musicians

- ACA-Ne – vocals
- Nozomu Kitamura – drums (1, 9, 13)
- Rock Sakurai – bass guitar (1, 9, 13)
- Katsushiro Sato – guitar (1, 9, 13)
- Nao Nishimura – piano (1, 9, 13)
- Yoshihiro Kawamura – drums (2–4, 11)
- Ryosuke Nikamoto – bass guitar (2–4, 8, 11)
- Sasaki 'Kojiro' Takayuki – guitar (2–5, 7, 8, 10, 11)
- Jun Murayama – piano (2–4, 6, 8, 11), keyboards (2, 3)
- Norihide Saji – drums (5, 7)
- Takashi Adachi – bass guitar (5, 7)
- Yuki Kishida – piano (5, 7)
- Ken Higeshiro – drums (8)
- Junpei Hayashida – cello (8)
- Anzu Suhara - violin (11)
- Singo Kubota – guitar (11)
- Satoru Kuribayash – piano (11)
- 100kai Outo - chorus (4)

Technical

- Toru Matake – mixing, recording engineering
- Takeo Kira – mastering
- Kōhei Matsumoto – producing

== Charts ==
=== Weekly charts ===
Weekly chart performance for Hisohiso Banashi
Chart (2019)	Peak position
Japanese Albums (Oricon)	5
Japanese Combined Albums (Oricon)	5
Japanese Digital Albums (Oricon)	2
Japanese Hot Albums (Billboard Japan)	4
Japanese Download Albums (Billboard Japan)	2

== Release history ==
Release history and formats for Hisohiso Banashi
Region	Date	Format(s)	Version	Label	Ref.
Various	October 28, 2019	Digital download; streaming	Regular	EMI; Universal Japan	
Japan	October 30, 2019	CD	Regular	EMI; Universal Japan	
Japan	October 30, 2019	CD	Limited Edition α	EMI; Universal Japan	
Japan	October 30, 2019	CD	Limited Edition β	EMI; Universal Japan	
Japan	November 12, 2025	Vinyl	Regular	EMI; Universal Japan	
