= Ultra C =

Japanese idiom

The term Ultra C or Ultra-C is a cultural idiom in Japan that started as a term for the strategy used by the Japanese men's Olympic gymnastics team in 1964.

The origin of the term is uncertain, though its creation and popularization has been attributed to gymnasts Akitomo Kaneko and Tadao Uesako as well as the head coach of the team, Toshihiko Sasano. According to the archives of The Asahi Shimbun, it was first used in a newspaper headline in April 1964, six months before the 1964 Summer Olympics.

At the time of the 1964 Olympics, men's gymnastic elements were assigned a difficulty rating A-C, with A being easier than C. (Since then, the difficulty ratings have expanded to A-J.) The term "ultra-C" was used to describe the men's team's strategy for the Olympics, as a metaphor for their goal to perform on a level beyond the best score, or to give "110%", and for the increasingly difficult elements innovated by men such as Mitsuo Tsukahara. This strategy ultimately brought them the gold medal that year, and the term stuck so well it entered the Japanese lexicon.

The phrase became popular in Japan and even lent to the title of the show Ultra Q, and its sequel Ultraman. It also became used for difficult elements in Russian and English artistic gymnastics circles, including those performed by women.

The term was adopted in figure skating by Russian fan circles and media, and it is now commonly used by figure skating fans internationally, referring to the most difficult elements in women's single skating, the triple axel and quadruple jump.
