= Kaneko Ayano =

Japanese singer-songwriter (1993–)

- Kaneko performing on tour in Kuala Lumpur, Malaysia, in 2025
- Born: Ayano Kaneko (金子綾乃); January 30, 1993 (age 33); Yokohama, Kantō, Japan
- Years active: 2012 –
- Website: https://kanekoayano.net/

Ayano Kaneko (カネコアヤノ, Kaneko Ayano; January 30, 1993), known as Kanekoayano, is a Japanese singer-songwriter and model, regarded as one of the most popular figures in Japanese indie music. She began her career as a solo artist, making her debut with the 2012 album Inzei Seikatsu, and currently works with her band kanekoayano.

== Discography ==
Kaneko in Singapore in 2025

Album releases
Date	Releases	Original title for domestic market	Tracks
2026-05-13	Blue/It's Still Fine	ブルー/まだ問題ない	2 songs
2026-04-15	Nippon Budokan LIVE 2026 kanekoayano	Nippon Budokan LIVE 2026 kanekoayano	25 songs
2026-03-31	As much as possible / I have friends	できるだけ/友達がいる	2 songs
2025-09-29	LIVE 2025 kanekoayano	LIVE 2025 kanekoayano	18 songs
2025-04-25	thread of stone	石の糸	10 songs
2023-03-15	A towel blanket is peaceful Hitorideni	タオルケットは穏やかな ひとりでに	10 songs
2023-01-25	towelket ha odayakana	タオルケットは穏やかな	10 songs
2023-01-16	Kaneko Ayano One Man Show 2022 Autumn – 9.26 Kannai Hall	カネコアヤノ 単独演奏会 2022 秋 – 9.26 関内ホール	18 songs
2021-05-19	yosuga hitorideni	よすが ひとりでに	10 songs
2021-04-14	yosuga	よすが	11 songs
2019-11-13	Sansan Hitorideni	燦々 ひとりでに	12 songs
2019-09-18	Sansan	燦々	12 songs
2018-08-04	Shukusai Hitorideni	祝祭 ひとりでに	13 songs
2018-04-25	Shukusai	祝祭	13 songs
2015-11-11	Koisuru Wakusei	恋する惑星	10 songs
2014-05-14	Raise Wa Idol	来世はアイドル	8 songs
2024-05-07	Kaneko Ayano Billboard Live Onemanshow 2023: 15.12 Billboard Live OSAKA	カネコアヤノ Billboard Live ワンマンショー 2023 – 12.15 Billboard Live OSAKA	12 songs
2017-12-20	Sayonara Anata (Second Edition)	さよーならあなた(Second Edition)	4 songs
2024-04-17	Lucky/Sabishikunai	ラッキー / さびしくない	2 songs
2022-12-07	Kibun	気分	1 song
2022-11-16	Yokan	予感	1 song
2022-04-13	Watashitachihe	わたしたちへ	1 song
2021-03-24	Houyo	抱擁	1 song
2021-03-03	Hirameki ha kanata	閃きは彼方	1 song
2020-11-25	udenonakadeshikanemurenainekonoyouni	腕の中でしか眠れない猫のように	1 song
2020-04-01	Ranman/Hoshiuranaitoasa	爛漫 / 星占いと朝	2 songs
2019-09-03	Bokura Hanataba Mitai Ni Yorisotte	ぼくら花束みたいに寄り添って	1 song
2019-08-16	Hikari No Hou E	光の方へ	1 song
2019-04-17	Ai No Mama Wo/Sezon	愛のままを / セゾン	2 songs
2018-03-28	Home Alone	Home Alone	1 song
2017-04-26	Hikareai	ひかれあい	6 songs
