= Shall We Travel?? =

Studio album by Naoto Inti Raymi
- Released: July 7, 2010
- Recorded: 2009–2010
- Genre: J-pop, funk, latin
- Length: 49:48
- Label: Universal Music Japan

Naoto Inti Raymi chronology
Ultra C (2009)	Shall We Travel?? (2010)	Adventure (2011)

Singles from Shall We Travel??
- 1. "Carnival?" Released: April 7, 2010; 2. "Takaramono (Kono Koe ga Naku Naru Made)" Released: May 19, 2010

Shall We Travel?? (stylised as Shall we travel??) is Naoto Inti Raymi's first album released through Universal Music Japan, and second original album. It was released on July 7, 2010. Universal describes the album in the official news as a "colourful and happy sound trip."

== Background ==
This is Naoto Inti Raymi's first album under major label Universal Music Japan. He previously released Funk Renaissance in 2002 under Sony in 2002 as Naoto, and an independent EP in 2009.

The album was released after two singles: "Carnival?" in April and "Takaramono (Kono Koe ga Naku Naru Made)" in May. "Carnival?" peaked at #34 on Oricon's single charts, and "Takaramono (Kono Koe ga Naku Naru Made)" at #15. "Takaramono (Kono Koe ga Naku Naru Made)" found success on RIAJ's Digital Track Chart, reaching #5 for three weeks and charting in the top 10 for four weeks.

== Promotion ==
Naoto Inti Raymi performed an acoustic live at travel agency H.I.S.' Shinjuku head office on May 19, 2010.

== Track listing ==
No.	Title	Writer(s)	Arranger(s)	Length
1.	"Teki na Beat" (テキナビート "Cutting Beat")	Naoto Inti Raymi	Kaoru Okubo	2:44
2.	"Carnival? (Album Ver.)" (カーニバる? "Carnivalling?")	Shintarō Tokita, Naoto Inti Raymi	Naoto Inti Raymi	4:10
3.	"Hot! Hot!"	Naoto Inti Raymi	Okubo	3:57
4.	"Takaramono (Kono Koe ga Naku Naru Made)" (タカラモノ～この声がなくなるまで～ "Precious Thing (Until This Voice Fades)")	Naoto Inti Raymi	Soundbreakers	4:20
5.	"Natsu Oto" (夏音 "Summer Sound")	Naoto Inti Raymi	Soundbreakers	5:13
6.	"Independent World" (インディペンデント・ワールド Indipendento Wārudo)	Naoto Inti Raymi	Naoto Inti Raymi	3:51
7.	"Oh! My Destiny"	Naoto Inti Raymi	Soundbreakers	2:46
8.	"Hoshi no Jūnin" (星の住人 "Residents of the Stars")	Naoto Inti Raymi	Okubo	3:25
9.	"Kocchi e Oide" (こっちへおいで "Come Here")	Naoto Inti Raymi	Okubo	4:29
10.	"Wawawa"	Naoto Inti Raymi	Okubo	3:19
11.	"Kimi Life" (キミライフ "You Life")	Naoto Inti Raymi	Soundbreakers	4:29
12.	"Rising Sun"	Naoto Inti Raymi	Yuki Mitokatsu	4:05
Total length:				49:48
