= Cero (band) =

Japanese pop band

- Origin: Tokyo, Japan
- Genres: J-pop; alternative
- Years active: 2004–present
- Label: Kakubarhythm
- Members: Shōhei Takagi; Yū Arauchi; Tsubasa Hashimoto
- Past members: Tomoyuki Yanagi

Cero (Japanese pronunciation: [seꜜɾo]) are a Japanese pop band from Tokyo. The band was formed by singer, guitarist, and flautist Shōhei Takagi, keyboardist Yū Arauchi, and drummer Tomoyuki Yanagi in 2004. They were joined by guitarist Tsubasa Hashimoto in 2006 and musician Keiichi Suzuki became their producer in 2008. They released their debut album, World Record, in 2011, after which Yanagi departed the band. As a group of three, the band has released four studio albums; the most successful, Poly Life Multi Soul (2018), reached fourth place on the Oricon Albums Chart. The band has received three finalist awards at the CD Shop Awards and were named Best Alternative Artist at the 2016 Space Shower Music Awards.

== History ==
An abbreviation for Contemporary Exotica Rock Orchestra, Cero was formed in Tokyo by singer, guitarist, and flautist Shōhei Takagi, keyboardist Yū Arauchi, and drummer Tomoyuki Yanagi in 2004. They were joined by guitarist Tsubasa Hashimoto in 2006, and record producer and musician Keiichi Suzuki would begin to produce for the band in 2008 after developing an interest in their sound. They subsequently participated on the Commmons-released compilation album Strange Song Book: Tribute to Haruomi Hosono 2 (2008). In 2011, the band signed to indie label Kakubarhythm to release their debut studio album, World Record. It explores genres such as J-rap and dub pop for an avant garde and exotic-like sound, and peaked at number 170 on Oricon's Albums Chart. Following the album's release, Yanagi departed the band to focus on his work as an illustrator.

As a group of three, they released their next album My Lost City in 2012, which rose to 33rd on Oricon's chart. The band's third album, Obscure Ride (2015), won a finalist award at the 2016 CD Shop Awards. It was their first album to break into the top ten, charting on both Oricon's chart and Billboard Japan's Hot Albums. The CD singles "Yellow Magus" and the double A-sided "Orphans" / "Yōsari" had been released in preparation for the album; both reached the top 30 of the Oricon Singles Chart and charted around 50 on Billboard Japan's Hot 100. The same year as Obscure Ride, Takagi joined the FM802 program Music Freaks as a DJ on behalf of Cero alongside Blue Encount singer and guitarist Shunichi Tanabe. The band won Best Alternative Artist at the 2016 Space Shower Music Awards.

The band followed Obscure Ride with Poly Life Multi Soul in 2018, earning a second finalist accolade at the CD Shop Awards. Their most commercially successful album to date, it reached number four on Oricon's chart and eight on the Billboard Japan Hot Albums. They contributed music for the anime television series Carole & Tuesday in 2019. With the 2020s, all members of the band released solo albums: Takagi released Triptych (2020) under the solo project Shohei Takagi Parallela Botanica, Arauchi released Śisei (2021), and Hashimoto started the project Diorama Scene and released Awai (2022). The band's fifth and most recent album, E O (2023), peaked at number 27 on Oricon's chart.

== Members ==
Current members

- Shōhei Takagi – vocals, guitar, flute (2004–present)
- Yū Arauchi – keyboard, chorus vocals (2004–present)
- Tsubasa Hashimoto – guitar, clarinet, chorus vocals (2006–present)

Former members

- Tomoyuki Yanagi – drums (2004–2011)

== Discography ==
=== Studio albums ===
List of studio albums, with selected chart positions
Title	Album details	Peak chart positions			Sales
Title	Album details	JPN	JPN Comb	JPN Hot	Sales
World Record	Released: January 26, 2011; Label: Kakubarhythm	170	—	—	JPN: 1,121
My Lost City	Released: October 24, 2012; Label: Kakubarhythm	33	—	— (Note: My Lost City was released prior to the establishment of the Billboard Japan Hot Albums chart. Upon release, it reached number 27 on the Top Albums Sales ranking.)	JPN: 4,545
Obscure Ride	Released: May 27, 2015; Label: Kakubarhythm	8	—	7	JPN: 13,744
Poly Life Multi Soul	Released: May 16, 2018; Label: Kakubarhythm	4	—	8	JPN: 15,256
E O	Released: May 24, 2023; Label: Kakubarhythm	27	41	31	JPN: 3,620

=== Live albums ===
List of live albums
Title	Album details
Obscures: Live at Zepp Tokyo & Obscure Ride Tour Document	Released: February 24, 2016; Label: Kakubarhythm; Formats: DVD
Outdoors	Released: December 7, 2016; Label: Kakubarhythm; Formats: Blu-ray, DVD
Poly Life Multi Soul Tour: Live at Zepp DiverCity Tokyo	Released: January 23, 2019; Label: Kakubarhythm; Formats: Blu-ray, DVD
Live O Rec	Released: September 11, 2024; Label: Kakubarhythm; Formats: Digital download, streaming, CD

=== Singles ===
List of singles as lead artist, with selected chart positions
Title	Year	Peak positions		Sales	Album
Title	Year	JPN	JPN Hot	Sales	Album
"21-seiki no Hideri no Miyako ni Ame ga Furu" (21世紀の日照りの都に雨が降る)	2010	—	—		World Record
"Musashino Cruise Exotica" (武蔵野クルーズエキゾチカ)	2011	—	—		Non-album singles
"Good Life"	2011	—	—		Non-album singles
"Yellow Magus"	2013	29	54	JPN: 4,755	Obscure Ride
"Orphans"	2014	23	48	JPN: 4,119	Obscure Ride
"Yōsari" (夜去)	2014	23	—	JPN: 4,119	Obscure Ride
"Summer Soul"	2015	—	— (Note: "Summer Soul" did not chart on the Hot 100, but reached number 29 on the Billboard Japan Adult Contemporary Airplay chart.)		Obscure Ride
"Machi no Shirase" (街の報せ)	2016	37	58	JPN: 4,066	Non-album single
"Waters"	2018	—	—		Poly Life Multi Soul
"Poly Life Multi Soul"	2019	—	—		Poly Life Multi Soul
"Fdf"	2020	—	—		E O
"Nemesis"	2021	—	—		E O
"Cupola"	2022	—	—		E O
"Fuha"	2022	—	—		E O

=== Other charted songs ===
List of other charted songs as lead artist
Title	Year	Peak positions	Album
Title	Year	JPN Hot	Album
"Sakana no Hone Tori no Hane" (魚の骨鳥の羽根)	2018	33	Poly Life Multi Soul

== Awards and nominations ==
List of awards and nominations for Cero
Award	Year	Category	Recipient	Result	Ref.
CD Shop Awards	2016	Grand Prix	Obsure Ride	Finalist	
CD Shop Awards	2018	Grand Prix	Poly Life Multi Soul	Finalist	
CD Shop Awards	2024	Grand Prix	E O	Finalist	
Space Shower Music Awards	2016	Best Alternative Artist	Cero	Won	
