= Zutomayo =

Japanese rock group

Background information
- Origin: Japan
- Genre: Rock
- Years active: 2018–present
- Label: EMI
- Members: ACA-Ne (and unknown remains)
- Website: zutomayo.net

Zutto Mayonaka de Ii no ni., (Note: Japanese: ずっと真夜中でいいのに。; Chinese: 永遠是深夜有多好。; Hanyu Pinyin: Yǒngyuǎn Shì Shēnyè Yǒu Duō Hǎo.; lit. 'I Wish It Were Midnight All the Time.'.) (Note: Official romanized notation, as used in the English title of the music video for "Humanoid" on YouTube.) usually shortened to Zutomayo, (Note: Stylized in all caps or occasionally all lowercase; Japanese: ずとまよ; also ZTMY.) is a Japanese rock group that debuted in 2018. Secretive by nature, the group has never released a full member list, crediting different people for arrangements and music video production each time. The only member reoccurring in all of the group's output is the vocalist and songwriter, an unidentified woman referred to as "ACA-Ne". (Note: Japanese: ACAね; pronounced Akane.)

Despite the little information released, the group is commercially successful. Zutomayo's three EP's have reached 8th, 1st, and 2nd on the Oricon Albums Chart, respectively. The group was also invited to perform at the 2019 Fuji Rock Festival a year after their debut. They have a large fanbase, known as Zutomaro, (Note: Stylized in all caps; Japanese: ずとまろ.) a name given by ACA-Ne in the Q&A included with the first edition of the EP Imawa Imade Chikaiwa Emide.

== Style ==
Aside from ACA-Ne, the vocalist, it is unclear how many people are in the band. ACA-Ne has never revealed her face, and the band have performed behind a translucent screen during concerts, including at the 2019 Fuji Rock Festival. Many have pointed to Zutomayo's secrecy regarding its members contributing towards its popularity. In more recent performances however, other members of the band have been less secretive, choosing to show their faces.

Zutomayo typically produces rock music, often featuring intricate, funk-inspired basslines. ACA-Ne's voice has been described as "energetic", "expressive", and "delicate".

== History ==
The group debuted with the release of their first song, "Byōshin wo Kamu" (秒針を噛む), via YouTube on June 4, 2018. The song became an immediate hit, garnering 200,000 views within the first week. Additionally, after being released on streaming platforms on August 30, the song became the most streamed song in Japan that week. Following the song's release, Zutomayo held their first concert at Daikanyama Loop in Tokyo. Attendees were handed opaque glasses and reported that the entire venue was dark for the concert's duration. The group would continue to conceal their identities in future concerts.

Zutomayo released two more singles digitally before releasing their first EP, Tadashii Itsuwari Kara no Kishō (正しい偽りからの起床), on November 14 through EMI Records. The EP reached 8th on the Oricon Albums Chart and was nominated in the 19th CD Shop Awards. On June 5, 2019, a second EP was released titled Ima wa Ima de Chikai wa Emi de (今は今で誓いは笑みで), which topped the Oricon chart. The group's first full-length album, Hisohiso Banashi (潜潜話), was released on October 30 of the same year. The song "Darken" was used in the live-action film The Night Beyond the Tricornered Window, and "Hypersomnia" is also featured in the film. The group released Gusare (ぐされ) on February 10, 2021, featuring songs "One's Mind", "Can't Be Right", "STUDY ME", "Hunch Gray", "Have a", "Engine Oil", "Darken", "Milabo", "Loneliness", "Crop", "Hypersomnia", "Fastening", and "Inner Heart".

In October 2022, the group provided the song, "Time Left" (残機), for the second ending theme of the anime Chainsaw Man. In October 2024, they provided the ending theme "Taidada" for the anime Dandadan. In April 2025, they provided the opening theme "Warmthaholic" (微熱魔) for the second season of the anime Aharen-san wa Hakarenai. In February 2026, to celebrate the anniversary of Persona 3 Reload in Japan, Atlus released an animated music video that mixes Zutomayo's ''Hippocampal Pain'' with ''Mass Destruction - Reload'' by Lotus Juice.

== Discography ==
As of October 2024, Zutomayo had released five EPs and three full-length albums. Some songs contained in these albums were released digitally before the album's release.

=== Studio albums ===
Title	Details	Peak chart positions			Sales	Certifications
Title	Details	JPN	JPN Comb.	JPN Hot	Sales	Certifications
Hisohiso Banashi	Released: October 30, 2019; Label: EMI; Format: CD, vinyl, digital download, streaming	5	5	4	JPN: 33,724	
Gusare	Released: February 10, 2021; Label: EMI; Format: CD, vinyl, digital download, streaming	2	2	2	JPN: 52,654	RIAJ: Gold (st.)
Jinkōgaku	Released: June 7, 2023; Label: EMI; Format: CD, vinyl, digital download, streaming	4	3	2	JPN: 31,494	
Keisōdo	Released: March 25, 2026; Label: EMI; Format: CD, digital download, streaming	4	4	6	JPN: 31,115	

=== Extended plays ===
Title	Details	Peak chart positions			Sales
Title	Details	JPN	JPN Comb.	JPN Hot	Sales
Tadashii Itsuwarikarano Kishō	Released: November 14, 2018; Label: EMI; Format: CD, digital download, streaming	8	—	3	JPN: 18,032
Imawa Imade Chikaiwa Emide	Released: June 12, 2019; Label: EMI; Format: CD, digital download, streaming	1	1	1	JPN: 25,217
Hogarakana Hifutote Fufuku	Released: August 5, 2020; Label: EMI; Format: CD, digital download, streaming	2	2	2	JPN: 31,349
Nobi Shigusa Korite Itomagoi	Released: February 16, 2022; Label: EMI; Format: CD, digital download, streaming	1	1	1	JPN: 23,266
Koke no Ichinen Kaiba ni Takusu	Released: October 23, 2024; Label: EMI; Format: CD, digital download, streaming	3	3	3	JPN: 19,215

==== Compilation extended plays ====
Title	Details
Zutomayo's Playlist for U.S.	Released: August 27, 2021; Label: Universal; Formats: Digital download, streaming
Zutomayo's Playlist for U.S. Vol. 2	Released: April 22, 2022; Label: Universal; Formats: Digital download, streaming

=== Singles ===
Title	Year	Peak chart positions				Certifications	Album
Title	Year	JPN	JPN Comb.	JPN Hot	WW Excl. US	Certifications	Album
"Byōshin o Kamu" (秒針を噛む)	2018	—	—	42	—	RIAJ: Platinum (st.)	Hisohiso Banashi
"Nōriueno Cracker" (脳裏上のクラッカー)	2018	—	—	— (Note: "Nōriueno Cracker" did not enter the Billboard Japan Hot 100 chart, but peaked at number 66 on the Billboard Japan Download Songs chart.)	—	RIAJ: Gold (st.)	Hisohiso Banashi
"Humanoid" (ヒューマノイド)	2018	—	—	—	—	RIAJ: Gold (st.)	Hisohiso Banashi
"Mabushii DNA Dake" (眩しいDNAだけ)	2019	—	—	97	—		Hisohiso Banashi
"Seigi" (正義)	2019	—	—	— (Note: "Seigi" did not enter the Billboard Japan Hot 100 chart, but peaked at number 35 on the Billboard Japan Download Songs chart.)	—		Hisohiso Banashi
"Kettobashita Mōfu" (蹴っ飛ばした毛布)	2019	—	—	— (Note: "Kettobashita Mōfu" did not enter the Billboard Japan Hot 100 chart, but peaked at number 89 on the Billboard Japan Download Songs chart.)	—		Hisohiso Banashi
"Obenkyō Shitoiteyo" (お勉強しといてよ)	2020	—	21	20	—	RIAJ: Gold (st.)	Gusare
"Darken" (暗く黒く)	2020	—	—	49	—		Gusare
"Hunch Gray" (勘ぐれい)	2020	—	—	50	—		Gusare
"Can't Be Right" (正しくなれない)	2020	—	22	22	187	RIAJ: Platinum (st.)	Gusare
"Inside Joke" (あいつら全員同窓会)	2021	—	19	16	122	RIAJ: Platinum (st.)	Jinkōgaku
"Stay Foolish" (ばかじゃないのに)	2021	—	—	45	—		Jinkōgaku
"Neko Reset" (猫リセット)	2021	—	—	95	—		Jinkōgaku
"Mirror Tune" (ミラーチューン)	2022	—	—	43	—		Jinkōgaku
"Blush" (消えてしまいそうです)	2022	18	47	65	—		Jinkōgaku
"Summer Slack" (夏枯れ)	2022	—	—	— (Note: "Summer Slack" did not enter the Billboard Japan Hot 100 chart, but peaked at number 50 on the Billboard Japan Download Songs chart.)	—		Jinkōgaku
"Time Left" (残機)	2022	—	14	14	136	RIAJ: Platinum (st.)	Jinkōgaku
"Kira Killer" (綺羅キラー) (featuring Mori Calliope)	2022	—	39	32	—	RIAJ: Gold (st.)	Jinkōgaku
"Intrusion" (不法侵入)	2023	—	—	90	—		Jinkōgaku
"Truth in Lies" (嘘じゃない)	2024	—	—	75	—		Keisoudo
"Blues In The Closet"	2024	—	—	— (Note: "Blues In The Closet" did not enter the Billboard Japan Hot 100 chart, but peaked at number 34 on the Billboard Japan Download Songs chart.)	—		Koke no ichinen Kaiba ni takusu
"Hippocampal Pain" (海馬成長痛)	2024	—	— (Note: "Hippocampal Pain" did not enter the Oricon Combined Singles chart, but peaked at number 18 on the Oricon Digital Singles Chart.)	— (Note: "Hippocampal Pain" did not enter the Billboard Japan Hot 100 chart, but peaked at number 20 on the Billboard Japan Download Songs chart.)	—		Keisoudo
"Shade" (シェードの埃は延長)	2025	—	—	— (Note: "Shade" did not enter the Billboard Japan Hot 100 chart, but peaked at number 24 on the Billboard Japan Download Songs chart.)	—		Keisoudo
"Warmthaholic" (微熱魔)	2025	—	—	— (Note: "Warmthaholic" did not enter the Billboard Japan Hot 100 chart, but peaked at number 24 on the Billboard Japan Download Songs chart.)	—		Keisoudo
"Cream" (クリームで会いにいけますか)	2025	—	—	86	—		Keisoudo (Disco Re-Edit)
"Pain Give Form" (形)	2025	—	—	66	—		Keisōdo
"Medianoche" (メディアノーチェ)	2026	—	—	— (Note: "Medianoche" did not enter the Billboard Japan Hot 100 chart, but peaked at number 38 on the Billboard Japan Download Songs chart.)	—		Keisōdo
"Fig Smoke" (イチジク煙)	2026	—	—	— (Note: "Fig Smoke" did not enter the Billboard Japan Hot 100 chart, but peaked at number 13 on the Billboard Japan Download Songs chart.)	—		Non-album singles
"Akanesasu" (あかねさす頃)	2026	—	58	28	—		Non-album singles
"—" denotes releases that did not chart or were not released in that region.

=== Promotional singles ===
Title	Year	Peak chart positions		Certifications	Album
Title	Year	JPN Comb.	JPN Hot	Certifications	Album
"Kan Saete Kuyashiiwa" (勘冴えて悔しいわ)	2019	—	97	RIAJ: Gold (st.)	Hisohiso Banashi
"Konnakoto Sōdō" (こんなこと騒動)	2019	—	— (Note: "Konnakoto Sōdō" did not enter the Billboard Japan Hot 100 chart, but peaked at number 83 on the Billboard Japan Download Songs chart.)		Hisohiso Banashi
"Haze Haseru Haterumade" (ハゼ馳せる果てるまで)	2019	—	100		Hisohiso Banashi
"Milabo"	2020	44	31	RIAJ: Gold (st.)	Gusare
"Fastening" (低血ボルト)	2020	—	— (Note: "Fastening" did not enter the Billboard Japan Hot 100 chart, but peaked at number 64 on the Billboard Japan Download Songs chart.)		Gusare
"Hypersomnia" (過眠)	2021	—	—		Gusare
"Quilt" (袖のキルト)	2022	—	50		Jinkōgaku
"Hanaichi Monnme" (花一匁)	2023	—	70		Jinkōgaku
"Taidada"	2024	49	42	RIAJ: Gold (st.)	Keisoudo
"Yushinron" (有心論)	2025	16	15		Dear Jubilee: Radwimps Tribute
"Yomosugara" (よもすがら)	2026	—	— (Note: "Yomosugara" did not enter the Billboard Japan Hot 100 chart, but peaked at number 72 on the Billboard Japan Download Songs chart.)		Keisoudo
"—" denotes releases that did not chart or were not released in that region.

=== Other charted songs ===
List of other charted songs, with selected chart positions, showing year released and album name
Title	Year	Peak chart positions	Album
Title	Year	JPN Hot	Album
"Inemuri Enseitai" (居眠り遠征隊)	2019	— (Note: "Inemuri Enseitai" did not enter the Billboard Japan Hot 100 chart, but peaked at number 92 on the Billboard Japan Download Songs chart.)	Hisohiso Banashi
"One's Mind" (胸の煙)	2021	— (Note: "One's Mind" did not enter the Billboard Japan Hot 100 chart, but peaked at number 75 on the Billboard Japan Download Songs chart.)	Gusare
"Flow Different" (違う曲にしようよ)	2022	— (Note: "Flow Different" did not enter the Billboard Japan Hot 100 chart, but peaked at number 64 on the Billboard Japan Download Songs chart.)	Nobi Shigusa Korite Itomagoi
"Kisumi at Midnight" (夜中のキスミ)	2022	— (Note: "Kisumi at Midnight" did not enter the Billboard Japan Hot 100 chart, but peaked at number 88 on the Billboard Japan Download Songs chart.)	Nobi Shigusa Korite Itomagoi
"Kuzuri" (クズリ念)	2024	— (Note: "Kuzuri" did not enter the Billboard Japan Hot 100 chart, but peaked at number 85 on the Billboard Japan Download Songs chart.)	Koke no Ichinen Kaiba ni Takusu
"—" denotes items that did not chart.

== Videography ==
=== Live albums ===
Title	Details
Cleaning Labo	Released: September 29, 2021; Label: EMI; Formats: Blu-ray
Zutomayo Factory	Released: August 24, 2022; Label: EMI; Formats: Blu-ray
Authentic Chinese Kissa "Ai no Pegasus" -Spicy Dragon of Love-	Released: September 25, 2024; Label: EMI; Formats: Blu-ray, streaming
Midnight Forever Expo ‘Meiko wa Gunaruga Gotoshi’ (Live)	Released: September 17, 2025; Label: EMI; Formats: Blu-ray, streaming
