= Tadashii Itsuwarikarano Kishō =

- Regular edition cover

EP by Zutomayo
- Released: November 14, 2018
- Genre: J-pop
- Length: 53:11
- Language: Japanese
- Label: EMI

Zutomayo chronology
Tadashii Itsuwarikarano Kishō (2018)	Imawa Imade Chikaiwa Emide (2019)

Singles from Tadashii Itsuwari Kara no Kishō
- 1. "Byōshinwo Kamu" Released: August 30th, 2018; 2. "Nōriueno Cracker" Released: October 24th, 2018; 3. "Humanoid" Released: November 7th, 2018

Alternative cover
- First press limited edition cover

Tadashii Itsuwarikarano Kishō (正しい偽りからの起床) is the first extended play (EP) released by the Japanese rock group Zutomayo. The EP was released on November 14, 2018, under EMI Records.

== Release and reception ==
Tadashii Itsuwarikarano Kishō follows the release of three of Zutomayo's singles and is the first to be released in a physical format, as opposed to a digital release only. Two versions were released simultaneously: a regular edition and a first press limited edition. Following its release, the EP charted on both the Oricon Albums Chart and the Billboard Japan Hot 100. The EP was also nominated for the 11th CD Shop Awards.

== Track listing ==
All tracks are written by ACA-ne.

Tadashii Itsuwarikarano Kishō track listing
No.	Title	Arrangement	Length
1.	"Byōshinwo Kamu" (秒針を噛む)	Nuyuri	4:18
2.	"Humanoid" (ヒューマノイド)	Akihiro Sekiguchi; Ram Seeni; Naoki Itai	4:19
3.	"Saturn" (サターン)	Shingo Kubota	4:10
4.	"Uni to Kuri" (雲丹と栗)	100 Kai Ōto	4:32
5.	"Nōriueno Cracker" (脳裏上のクラッカー)	100 Kai Ōto	4:29
6.	"Kimigaite Mizuninaru" (君がいて水になる)	Yūkisan	4:46
Total length:			26:34

CD edition track listing
No.	Title	Length
7.	"Byōshinwo Kamu" (Instrumental)	4:18
8.	"Humanoid" (Instrumental)	4:18
9.	"Saturn" (Instrumental)	4:09
10.	"Uni to Kuri" (Instrumental)	4:32
11.	"Nōriueno Cracker" (Instrumental)	4:29
12.	"Kimigaite Mizuninaru" (Instrumental)	4:45
Total length:		53:11

== Weekly charts ==
Chart (2019)	Peak position
Japan (Japan Hot 100)	3
Japan (Oricon)	8
