= Superfly discography =

- Studio albums: 8
- Extended plays: 3
- Compilation albums: 4
- Singles: 37
- Video albums: 5
- Music videos: 41

The discography of Japanese musical act Superfly consists of eight studio albums, four compilation albums, three extended plays, five video albums and thirty-seven singles. Superfly began as a duo in 2003 by vocalist Shiho Ochi and guitarist Koichi Tabo; signing with Warner Music Japan in 2007. Tabo left the band in 2007 just before the release of their single "I Spy I Spy", finding it difficult to work as both the act's songwriter and guitarist. However, Tabo remained attached to Superfly, composing and producing songs for the unit until Superfly's single "Ai o Karada ni Fukikonde" (2014) and Superfly's fifth studio album White (2015), where Ochi collaborated with a range of songwriters instead.

In 2008, Superfly were chosen to sing "Ai o Komete Hanataba o", the theme song for the TV drama, Edison no Haha, starring Misaki Ito. The song was certified Million for digital downloads by the RIAJ. The band's debut album Superfly (2008) was released three months later and debuted at the top of the Japanese Oricon albums chart. Six of their releases between 2008 and 2013 reached number one on Oricon's albums chart. Other than "Ai o Komete Hanataba o", the act's most commercially successful songs include "Alright!!" (2009), the opening theme song for the drama Boss, and "Tamashii Revolution" (2010), a song used by NHK during the 2010 FIFA World Cup and other soccer broadcasts. Both of these songs have been certified Double Platinum by the RIAJ. Superfly achieved one number-one single on the Billboard Japan Hot 100, the theme song for Fuji Television drama Gold, "Wildflower" (2010). As the single was packaged together with an additional compilation album of Western covers, Cover Songs: Complete Best 'Track 3', it was ineligible to chart on the Japanese Oricon singles chart, achieving number one on the Oricon weekly albums chart instead.

== Albums ==
=== Studio albums ===
List of albums, with selected chart positions, sales and certifications.
Title	Album details	Peak positions			Sales (Note: This list only includes sales of physical CD or CD single copies; sales provided by Oricon database and are rounded to the nearest thousand copies. Sales also represent Japan only.)	Certifications
Title	Album details	JPN	JPN Comb.	JPN Hot	Sales	Certifications
Superfly	Released: May 14, 2008; Label: Warner Japan; Formats: CD, digital download	1	—	68	510,000	RIAJ: 2× Platinum
Box Emotions	Released: September 2, 2009; Label: Warner; Formats: CD, digital download	1	—	—	561,000	RIAJ: 2× Platinum
Mind Travel	Released: June 15, 2011; Label: Warner; Formats: CD, digital download	1	—	—	359,000	RIAJ: Platinum
Force	Released: September 19, 2012; Label: Warner; Formats: CD, CD/DVD, digital download, vinyl	1	—	—	228,000	RIAJ: Platinum
White	Released: May 27, 2015; Label: Warner; Formats: CD, 2CD, digital download	2	—	1	171,000	RIAJ: Gold
0	Released: January 15, 2020; Label: Warner; Formats: CD, digital download	3	3	3	41,000	
Heat Wave	Released: May 23, 2023; Label: Universal Sigma; Formats: CD, digital download, streaming	7	8	7	14,322	
Amazing	Released: June 16, 2025; Label: Universal Sigma; Formats: CD, digital download, streaming	6	4	4	16,907	

=== Compilation albums ===
List of albums, with selected chart positions, sales and certifications.
Title	Album details	Peak positions	Sales	Certifications
Title	Album details	Oricon	Sales	Certifications
Cover Songs: Complete Best 'Track 3'	Released: September 1, 2010; Label: Warner; Formats: 2CD, digital download	1	315,000 (Note: "Wildflower" and Cover Songs: Complete Best 'Track 3' were released as a single two-CD set and charted on the Oricon albums chart.)	RIAJ: Platinum
Superfly Best	Released: September 25, 2013; Label: Warner; Formats: 2CD, digital download	1	402,000	RIAJ: Platinum
Coupling Songs: 'Side B'	Released: December 2, 2015; Label: Warner; Formats: CD, digital download	2	73,000 (Note: "Kuroi Shizuku" and Coupling Songs: 'Side B' were compiled together as a single two CD set.)	
Love, Peace & Fire	Released: April 4, 2017; Label: Warner; Formats: CD, digital download	1		

=== Extended plays ===
Title	Album details
Live from Tokyo	Released: June 27, 2007; Label: Warner; Formats: digital download
Dancing at Budokan!! Live EP	Released: March 31, 2010; Label: Warner; Formats: digital download
Selected from Shout in the Rainbow!!	Released: April 4, 2012; Label: Warner; Formats: digital download

== Singles ==
List of singles, with selected chart positions, sales and certifications
Title	Year	Peak chart positions		Sales	Certifications	Album
Title	Year	Oricon Singles Charts	Billboard Japan Hot 100 (Note: Sources for chart positions are as follows: "Ai o Komete Hanataba o", "Hi-Five", "How Do I Survive?", "My Best of My Life", "Alright!!", "Koisuru Hitomi wa Utsukushii", "Yasashii Kimochi de", "Hanky Panky", "Dancing on the Fire", "Tamashii Revolution", "Wildflower", "Eyes on Me", "Beep!!", "Sunshine Sunshine", "You & Me", "Rollin' Days", "Ah", "Ai o Kurae", "Sasurai no Tabibito", "Stars", "Kagayaku Tsuki no Yō ni", "Force", "Bi-Li-Li Emotion", "Starting Over", "Live", "You You", "Ai o Karada ni Fukikonde", "White Light", "Beautiful", "On Your Side", "Kuroi Shizuku". "Voice" "Dynamite" "Ashes")	Sales	Certifications	Album
"Hello Hello" (ハロー・ハロー, Harō Harō)	2007	31	—	13,000	RIAJ (digital): Gold	Superfly
"Manifesto" (マニフェスト, Manifesuto)	2007	51	—	6,000		Superfly
"I Spy I Spy" (Superfly x Jet)	2007	55	—	7,000		Superfly
"Ai o Komete Hanataba o" (愛をこめて花束を; "Put Love in a Bouquet")	2008	13	7	47,000	RIAJ (ringtone): Million; RIAJ (digital): Million; RIAJ (streaming): 3× Platinum	Superfly
"Hi-Five"	2008	30	7	13,000	RIAJ (digital): Platinum	Superfly
"How Do I Survive?"	2008	10	3	20,000	RIAJ (cellphone): Gold; RIAJ (PC): Gold	Box Emotions
"My Best of My Life"	2009	11	3	31,000	RIAJ (digital): Platinum	Box Emotions
"Alright!!"	2009	—	11		RIAJ (ringtone): 2× Platinum; RIAJ (digital): 2× Platinum	Box Emotions
"Koisuru Hitomi wa Utsukushii"^{‡} (恋する瞳は美しい; "Loving Eyes Are Beautiful")	2009	12 (Note: As a double A-side release, Oricon publishes a single charting position for this release.)	6	23,000	RIAJ (cellphone): Gold; RIAJ (PC): Gold	Box Emotions
"Yasashii Kimochi de"^{‡} (やさしい気持ちで; "With Tender Feelings")	2009	12	61	23,000	RIAJ (digital): Platinum	Box Emotions
"Dancing on the Fire"	2009	7	6	29,000	RIAJ (digital): Gold	Non-album single
"Wildflower"	2010	1 (Note: Charted on the Oricon albums chart.)	1	315,000	RIAJ (digital): Platinum	Mind Travel
"Eyes on Me"	2010	5	2	37,000	RIAJ (digital): Gold	Mind Travel
"Sunshine Sunshine"^{‡}	2011	5	6	27,000		Mind Travel
"Beep!!"^{‡}	2011	5	5	27,000		Mind Travel
"Rollin' Days"	2011	—	5		RIAJ (digital): Gold	Mind Travel
"Ah" (あぁ, Aa)	2011	9	13	20,000		Mind Travel
"Ai o Kurae" (愛をくらえ; "Get Love")	2011	3	3	24,000		Force
"Stars" (Superfly & Tortoise Matsumoto)	2012	15	5	21,000	RIAJ (digital): Gold	New Face (Note: Tortoise Matsumoto's third studio album.)
"Kagayaku Tsuki no Yō ni"^{‡} (輝く月のように; "Like the Sparkling Moon")	2012	6	3	29,000	RIAJ (digital): Platinum; RIAJ (streaming): Gold	Force
"The Bird Without Wings"^{‡}	2012	6	—	29,000		Force
"Force"	2012	9	5	16,000		Force
"Live"	2014	8	7	17,000		White
"Ai o Karada ni Fukikonde" (愛をからだに吹き込んで; "Breathe Love into Your Body")	2014	12	12	23,000	RIAJ (digital): Gold	White
"White Light"	2015	—	25			White
"On Your Side"	2015	9	23	15,000		White
"Kuroi Shizuku" (黒い雫; "Black Droplet")	2015	2	4	73,000		Non-album single
"Ambitious"	2019	10	—	12,500		0
"Flare"	2019	—	—			0
"Together"	2020	—	—			Non-album single
"Voice"	2022	—	70			Heat Wave
"Dynamite"	2022	—	35			Heat Wave
"Presence"	2022	—	—			Heat Wave
"Farewell"	2022	—	—			Heat Wave
"Ashes"	2023	—	90			Non-album singles
"Charade"	2024	—	—			Non-album singles
"Irodori" (彩り)	2025	—	—			Amazing
"Hito to Shite" (人として)	2025	—	—			Amazing
"—" denotes items which were released before the creation of the Billboard Japan Hot 100, items that did not chart or items that were ineligible to chart because no physical edition was released.; "^{‡}" denotes songs released together as a double A-side.

=== Promotional singles ===
List of promotional singles, with selected chart positions and certifications.
Title	Year	Peak chart positions	Certifications	Album
Title	Year	Billboard Japan Hot 100	Certifications	Album
"Ai to Kansha" (愛と感謝; "Love and Gratitude")	2007	—		Superfly
"Welcome to the Rockin' Show"	2009	— (Note: Charted at number 56 on the Adult Contemporary Airplay chart.)		"My Best of My Life" (single)
"Hanky Panky"	2009	91		Box Emotions
"Ai ni Dakarete" (愛に抱かれて; "Held by Love")	2009	— (Note: Charted at number 53 on the Adult Contemporary Airplay chart.)		Box Emotions
"Haru no Maboroshi" (春のまぼろし; "A Spring Dream")	2009	— (Note: Charted at number 97 on the Adult Contemporary Airplay chart.)		Box Emotions
"(You Make Me Feel Like) A Natural Woman"	2010	—		Wildflower & Cover Songs
"Tamashii Revolution" (タマシイレボリューション; "Soul Revolution")	2010	5	RIAJ (download): 2× Platinum	Wildflower & Cover Songs / Mind Travel
"Roll Over the Rainbow"	2010	— (Note: Charted at number 75 on the Adult Contemporary Airplay chart.)		Wildflower & Cover Songs
"Free Planet"	2010	—		Wildflower & Cover Songs / Mind Travel
"You & Me"	2011	4		Non-album song
"Morris"	2011	— (Note: Charted at number 92 on the Adult Contemporary Airplay chart.)		Mind Travel
"No Bandage"	2012	—		Force
"Sasurai no Tabibito" (さすらいの旅人; "Wandering Traveler")	2012	36		Shout in the Rainbow!!
"Starting Over"	2013	48		Superfly Best
"Always"	2013	—		Superfly Best
"Bi-Li-Li Emotion"	2013	14	RIAJ (digital): Gold	Superfly Best
"You You"	2014	29		White
"Beautiful"	2015	5	RIAJ (digital): Platinum; RIAJ (streaming): Platinum	White
"Boku no Koto" (僕のこと)	2025	—		Amazing
"—" denotes items which were released before the creation of the Billboard Japan Hot 100 or items that did not chart.

=== Other charted songs ===
List of songs not released as singles or promotional singles, with selected chart positions
Title	Year	Peak chart positions	Album
Title	Year	RIAJ monthly ringtones	Album
"Oh My Precious Time"	2008	64	Superfly

== Other appearances ==
List of guest appearances that feature Superfly or Superfly vocalist Shiho Ochi
Title	Year	Album
"Hanasaka Fever" (花さかフィーバー, Hanasaka Fībā; "Flower Hill Fever") (Ulfuls featuring Bonnie Pink, Shiho (Superfly))	2007	"Ryōhō for You" (single) / Keep On, Move On
"All You Need Is Love" (among Japan United with Music)	2012	Non-album single

== Videography ==
=== Video albums ===
List of media, with selected chart positions
Title	Album details	Peak positions	
Title	Album details	DVD	Blu-ray
Rock'N'Roll Show 2008	Released: April 1, 2009; Label: Warner; Formats: DVD	16	—
Dancing at Budokan!!	Released: April 28, 2010; Label: Warner; Formats: DVD, Blu-ray	7	—
Shout in the Rainbow!!	Released: April 4, 2012; Label: Warner; Formats: DVD, Blu-ray	3	1
Force: Document & Live	Released: April 3, 2013; Label: Warner; Formats: DVD, Blu-ray	5	4
Give Me Ten!!!!!	Released: November 13, 2013; Label: Warner; Formats: DVD, Blu-ray	3	4
"—" denotes items which did not chart or were not released in a specific format.

=== Music videos ===
Title	Other performer(s)	Director(s)	Originating album	Year	Ref.
"Hello Hello"	—N/a	Inoue Tetsuo	Superfly	2007	
"Manifesto"	—N/a	Inoue Tetsuo	Superfly	2007	
"I Spy I Spy"	Jet	Inoue Tetsuo	Superfly	2007	
"Ai o Komete Hanataba o"	—N/a	Shuichi Banba	Superfly	2008	
"Hi-Five"	—N/a	Shuichi Banba	Superfly	2008	
"How Do I Survive?"	—N/a	Shuichi Banba	Box Emotions	2008	
"My Best of My Life"	—N/a	Shuichi Banba	Box Emotions	2009	
"Rock and Roll Hoochie Koo"	—N/a	Tooru Nomura	—N/a	2009	
"Yasashii Kimochi de"	—N/a	Shuichi Banba	Box Emotions	2009	
"Koisuru Hitomi wa Utsukushii"	—N/a	Shuichi Banba	Box Emotions	2009	
"Alright!!"	—N/a	Wataru Saito	Box Emotions	2009	
"Dancing on the Fire"	—N/a	Yusuke Tanaka	—N/a	2009	
"Tamashii Revolution (Short Ver.)"	—N/a	Tooru Nomura	Mind Travel	2010	
"Tamashii Revolution"	—N/a	Wataru Saito	Mind Travel	2010	
"Wildflower"	—N/a	Shuichi Banba	Mind Travel	2010	
"Roll Over the Rainbow"	—N/a	Hidenobu Tanabe	—N/a	2010	
"Free Planet"	—N/a	Shuichi Banba	Mind Travel	2010	
"Eyes on Me"	—N/a	Shuichi Banba	Mind Travel	2010	
"Beep!!"	—N/a	Wataru Saito	Mind Travel	2011	
"Rollin' Days"	—N/a	Shuichi Banba	Mind Travel	2011	
"Morris"	—N/a	Yasunori Kakegawa	Mind Travel	2011	
"Ah"	—N/a	Yasunori Kakegawa	Mind Travel	2011	
"Ah (Japanese Version)"	—N/a	Yasunori Kakegawa	Mind Travel	2011	
"Ai o Kurae"	—N/a	Shuichi Banba	Force	2011	
"Ai o Kurae (Movie Version)"	—N/a	Katsuhito Ishii, Tomoko Kamikawa	Force	2011	
"All You Need Is Love"	Japan United with Music	Unknown	—N/a	2012	
"Stars"	Tortoise Matsumoto	Shuichi Banba	New Face	2012	
"Kagayaku Tsuki no Yō ni"	—N/a	Gen Natsume	Force	2012	
"The Bird Without Wings"	—N/a	Shuichi Banba	Force	2012	
"No Bandage"	—N/a	Ryo	Force	2012	
"Force"	—N/a	Yasuhiko Shimizu	Force	2012	
"Always"	—N/a	Gen Natsume	Superfly Best	2013	
"Bi-Li-Li Emotion"	—N/a	Shuichi Banba	Superfly Best	2013	
"Starting Over"	—N/a	Takeshi Maruyama	Superfly Best	2013	
"Live"	—N/a	Yasuyuki Yamaguchi	White	2014	
"Ai o Karada ni Fukikonde"	—N/a	Gen Natsume	White	2014	
"White Light"	—N/a	Yutaka Kimura	White	2015	
"A Ha Ha"	—N/a	Mani Kato	White	2015	
"Beautiful"	—N/a	Shuichi Banba	White	2015	
"On Your Side"	—N/a	Yoshiyuki Okuyama	White	2015	
"Kuroi Shizuku"	—N/a	Atsunori Toshi	—N/a	2015	
