= Superfly Best =

Greatest hits album by Superfly
- Released: September 25, 2013
- Genre: Pop rock, blues rock
- Label: Warner Music Group

Superfly chronology
Force (2012)	Superfly Best (2013)	White (2015)

Superfly Best (stylized as Superfly BEST) is the 5th album from Japanese rock unit Superfly. It is the band's first greatest hits album, and commemorates the project's fifth anniversary. The album was released on September 25, 2013, and the two-disc set contains the band's 26 singles and three brand new tracks.

== Background ==
On May 29, 2013, Superfly announced that they were going to be releasing a greatest hits album in September of that year. Following this announcement, the band was revealed to have recorded a theme song for J-Wave's 25th anniversary titled "Starting Over". A week later, the band announced the title of the album and its contents. A music video for new song "Always" was released on August 13, 2013, and its lyrics and video are meant to evoke a feeling of nostalgia. The album's lead track was announced on August 27, 2013, as "Bi-Li-Li Emotion" which would be used as the theme song for the drama Doctor-X: Surgeon Michiko Daimon starting in October 2013.

Superfly Best sold 157 thousand copies in its first week, making it Superfly's sixth consecutive number 1 album on the Oricon. She is only the second solo female artist to achieve this feat.

== Track listing ==
Disc 1
No.	Title	Lyrics	Music	Arranger(s)	Length
1.	"Bi-Li-Li Emotion" (New song)	Shiho Ochi	Kōichi Tabo		4:45
2.	"Hello Hello" (ハロー・ハロー Harō Harō)	S. Ochi, jam	K. Tabo	K. Tabo	3:50
3.	"Manifesto" (マニフェスト)	S. Ochi, K. Tabo	K. Tabo	K. Tabo	4:00
4.	"I Spy I Spy" (with Jet)	Chris Cester, Mark Wilson, Superfly	C. Cester, M. Wilson, Superfly		3:35
5.	"Ai o Komete Hanataba o" (愛をこめて花束を, "Flowers with love")	S. Ochi, K. Tabo, Junji Ishiwatari	K. Tabo	Kōichi Tsuyata	4:53
6.	"Hi-Five"	S. Ochi, jam	K. Tabo	K. Tsutaya, K. Tabo	3:59
7.	"How Do I Survive?"	S. Ochi	K. Tabo	K. Tsutaya, K. Tabo	3:43
8.	"My Best of My Life"	S. Ochi	K. Tabo	K. Tsutaya	6:12
9.	"Alright!!"	S. Ochi	K. Tabo, S. Ochi	K. Tabo	4:17
10.	"Koisuru Hitomi wa Utsukushii" (恋する瞳は美しい, "Loving Eyes Are Beautiful")	S. Ochi	K. Tabo	K. Tsutaya	4:38
11.	"Yasashii Kimochi de" (やさしい気持ちで, "With Tender Feelings")	S. Ochi	K. Tabo	K. Tsutaya, K. Tabo	4:01
12.	"Dancing on the Fire"	Shiho Ochi	Kōichi Tabo	K. Tabo, Kōichi Tsutaya	4:11
13.	"Free Planet"	S. Ochi	K. Tabo	K. Tsutaya	3:21
14.	"Wildflower"	S. Ochi	K. Tabo	K. Tsutaya	4:24
15.	"Always" (New song)	S. Ochi	K. Tabo		4:57
Total length:					55:04

Disc 2
No.	Title	Lyrics	Music	Arranger(s)	Length
1.	"Tamashii Revolution" (タマシイレボリューション Tamashii Reboryūshon, "Spirit Revolution")	S. Ochi	S. Ochi	K. Tsutaya	3:43
2.	"Roll Over the Rainbow"	S. Ochi, jam	K. Tabo	K. Tsutaya	4:52
3.	"Eyes on Me"	S. Ochi	K. Tabo	K. Tsutaya	4:31
4.	"Beep!!"	S. Ochi, jam	K. Tabo	K. Tsutaya	4:11
5.	"Sunshine Sunshine"	S. Ochi	K. Tabo	K. Tsutaya	4:02
6.	"Rollin' Days"	S. Ochi	K. Tabo	K. Tsutaya	4:00
7.	"Ah" (あぁ Aa)	S. Ochi	K. Tabo	K. Tsutaya	3:32
8.	"Ai o Kurae" (愛をくらえ, "Get Love")	S. Ochi	K. Tabo	K. Tsutaya	4:36
9.	"Sasurai no Tabibito" (さすらいの旅人, "Wandering Traveler")	S. Ochi	K. Tabo	K. Tsutaya	4:17
10.	"Stars" (with Tortoise Matsumoto)	Tortoise Matsumoto	T. Matsumoto	K. Tsutaya	5:46
11.	"Kagayaku Tsuki no Yō ni" (輝く月のように, "Like the Shining Moon")	S. Ochi, jam	K. Tabo	K. Tsutaya	5:26
12.	"The Bird Without Wings"	S. Ochi	K. Tabo	K. Tsutaya	5:01
13.	"Force"	S. Ochi	K. Tabo	K. Tsutaya	3:29
14.	"Starting Over" (New song)	S. Ochi	K. Tabo		4:10
Total length:					57:26

Limited edition DVD
No.	Title	Length
1.	"Hello Hello"
2.	"Manifesto"
3.	"I Spy I Spy"
4.	"Ai o Komete Hanataba o"
5.	"Hi-Five"
6.	"How Do I Survive?"
7.	"My Best of My Life"
8.	"Alright!!"
9.	"Koisuru Hitomi wa Utsukushii"
10.	"Yasashii Kimochi de"
11.	"Dancing on the Fire"
12.	"Free Planet"
13.	"Wildflower"
14.	"Tamashii Revolution"
15.	"Roll Over the Rainbow"
16.	"Eyes on Me"
17.	"Beep!!"
18.	"Rollin' Days"
19.	"Ah"
20.	"Ai o Kurae"
21.	"Stars"
22.	"Kagayaku Tsuki no Yō ni"
23.	"The Bird Without Wings"
24.	"Force"

== Oricon Sales Chart ==
Release	Oricon chart	Peak position	Debut sales	Sales total
September 25, 2013	Daily Albums Chart	1	65,841	402,729
September 25, 2013	Weekly Albums Chart	1	156,556	402,729
September 25, 2013	Monthly Albums Chart	3	156,556	402,729
September 25, 2013	Yearly Albums Chart	9	333,693	402,729
