= Give Me Ten!!!!! =

5th Anniversary Super Live Give Me Ten!!!!!

Video by Superfly
- Released: November 13, 2013
- Recorded: 2013
- Genre: Pop-rock
- Label: Warner Music Japan

Superfly chronology
| Force: Document & Live (2013) | 5th Anniversary Super Live Give Me Ten!!!!! (2013) |

5th Anniversary Super Live Give Me Ten!!!!! is a video release by Japanese rock unit Superfly. It is the group's fifth video and features content from their March and April 2013 arena tour of the same name's stop at the Saitama Super Arena. The limited edition contains a second disc with the music videos for the new songs from fifth anniversary album Superfly Best.

== Track listing ==
Standard edition
| No. | Title | Length |
|---|---|---|
| 1. | "Hello Hello" |
| 2. | "Hi-Five" |
| 3. | "Manifesto" |
| 4. | "Koisuru Hitomi wa Utsukushii" |
| 5. | "1969" |
| 6. | "Rin" |
| 7. | "Secret Garden" |
| 8. | "Nitty Gritty" |
| 9. | "Identity no Yukue" |
| 10. | "Deep-sea Fish Orchestra" |
| 11. | "My Best of My Life" |
| 12. | "Tamashii Revolution" |
| 13. | "Heisei Homo Sapiens" |
| 14. | "How Do I Survive?" |
| 15. | "Uso to Romance" |
| 16. | "Get High! (Adrenaline)" |
| 17. | "Alright!!" |
| 18. | "Force" |
| 19. | "Kagayaku Tsuki no Yō ni" |
| 20. | "Standing Ovation" |
| 21. | "Beep!!" (Encore) |
| 22. | "Ai o Komete Hanataba o" (Encore) |
| 23. | "Rollin' Days" (Encore) |

Limited edition bonuses
| No. | Title | Length |
|---|---|---|
| 1. | "Bi-Li-Li Emotion", "Always", "Starting Over" (Music video and making of) |
