= Shout in the Rainbow!! =

Video by Superfly
- Released: April 4, 2012
- Recorded: December 21, 2011
- Genre: Pop-rock
- Length: 160:00
- Label: Warner Music Japan
- Producer: Kōichi Tsutaya

Superfly chronology
Dancing at Budokan!! (2010)	Shout in the Rainbow!! (2012)	Force: Document & Live (2013)

Shout in the Rainbow!! (stylized in Japan as Shout In The Rainbow!!) is the third video album released by Japanese rock act Superfly. The performances come from the final Osaka-jō Hall concert part of Superfly's late 2011 arena tour of the same name. The limited editions will include a bonus CD with a previously unreleased track. It is scheduled for release on April 4, 2012.

The Shout in the Rainbow!! Blu-ray release reached the number 1 spot of the Oricon Weekly Blu-ray charts for the week of its release, selling 8048 copies, while only reaching number 3 on the general DVD and music DVD charts after selling 13 thousand units. Since the Blu-ray chart's inception in July 2008, Superfly is only the fourth solo artist to ever top it.

== Track listing ==
The DVD edition is split into two discs, with disc 1 ending with "I Remember".

No.	Title	Length
1.	"Tamashii Revolution"
2.	"Fly to the Moon"
3.	"Wildflower"
4.	"Ain't No Crybaby"
5.	"Ai o Kurae"
6.	"Haru no Maboroshi"
7.	"Only You"
8.	"Ai o Komete Hanataba o"
9.	"Hail Holy Queen"
10.	"Aa"
11.	"I Remember"
12.	"Roll Over the Rainbow"
13.	"Rollin' Days"
14.	"Alright!!"
15.	"Free Planet"
16.	"Beep!!"
17.	"Dancing on the Fire"
18.	"Manifesto"
19.	"My Best of My Life"
20.	"Ai to Kansha"
21.	"Hi-Five"
Total length:		2:38:00

Limited edition CD single
No.	Title	Lyrics	Music	Arranger(s)	Length
1.	"Sasurai no Tabibito" (さすらいの旅人, "Wandering Traveler")	Shiho Ochi	Kōichi Tabo	Kōichi Tsutaya	4:18

The iTunes Store released a five-track audio EP of selected performances from the video album.

Selected from Shout In The Rainbow!! iTunes EP
No.	Title	Length
1.	"Rollin' Days" (Live from Shout In The Rainbow!!)	4:01
2.	"Alright!!" (Live from Shout In The Rainbow!!)	4:37
3.	"Beep!!" (Live from Shout In The Rainbow!!)	4:13
4.	"Manifesto" (Live from Shout In The Rainbow!!)	7:22
5.	"Aa" (Live from Shout In The Rainbow!!)	4:20
