= Force: Document & Live =

Video by Superfly
- Released: April 3, 2013
- Recorded: 2012
- Genre: Pop-rock
- Label: Warner Music Japan

Superfly chronology
Shout in the Rainbow!! (2012)	Force: Document & Live (2013)	Give Me Ten!!!!! (2013)

Force: Document & Live (stylized in Japan as Force～Document＆Live～) is a two-disc DVD released by Japanese rock unit Superfly. It is the group's fourth video and features content relating to the band's fourth studio album Force and its supporting Live Force tour. The first disc is a documentary of the recording of the studio album as well as the band's special fan club concert to debut the tracks to the fans. The second disc contains a recording of the band's stop at the Tokyo International Forum on the Live Force tour. The Blu-ray edition of the album compresses all of the tracks onto a single disc.

== Track listing ==
Disc 1: "Studio Force"
No.	Title	Length
1.	"Album Recording Documentary and Fan Club Tour Live"

Disc 2: "Live Force"
No.	Title	Length
1.	"Force"
2.	"Nitty Gritty"
3.	"Wildflower"
4.	"The Bird Without Wings"
5.	"No Bandage"
6.	"Ai o Kurae"
7.	"Shūen"
8.	"Ah"
9.	"Ai o Komete Hanataba o"
10.	"919"
11.	"Heisei Homo Sapiens"
12.	"I My Me Mine Mine"
13.	"Free Planet"
14.	"Get High! (Adrenaline)"
15.	"Alright!!"
16.	"Kagayaku Tsuki no Yō ni"
17.	"Tamashii Revolution" (Encore)
18.	"Owarinaki Game" (Encore)
19.	"Standing Ovation" (Encore)
