= Ai o Kurae =

Single by Superfly

from the album Force
- B-side: "I My Me Mine Mine"
- Released: October 12, 2011
- Recorded: 2011
- Genre: J-pop; rock
- Length: 4:37
- Label: Warner Music Japan
- Songwriters: Shiho Ochi; Kōichi Tabo

Superfly singles chronology
"Ah" (2011)	"Ai o Kurae" (2011)	"Stars" (2012)

Music video
- "Ai o Kurae" on YouTube

"Ai o Kurae" (愛をくらえ; lit. "Get Love") is the 14th single by Japanese rock band Superfly and the first single released after the band's "Mind Traveller" tour. Both of the song's two tracks are used as theme music for the 2011 film adaptation of the manga Smuggler. The DVD edition of the single features footage of Superfly's live concert at the Yokohama Red Brick Warehouse which was to promote the release of the band's third album Mind Travel. Superfly has stated that "Ai o Kurae" is a return to the band's old style. It ultimately peaked at number 3 on the Oricon Weekly Charts, the highest ranking on the Oricon Singles Chart yet for Superfly (the previous release "Wildflower & Cover Songs: Complete Best 'Track 3'" reached number 1 on the Albums Charts, despite being called a single by the band).

== Track listing ==
All lyrics are written by Shiho Ochi, all music arranged by Koichi Tsutaya.

CD
No.	Title	Music	Length
1.	"Ai o Kurae" (愛をくらえ, "Get Love")	Kōichi Tabo	4:37
2.	"I My Me Mine Mine"	Shiho Ochi	2:37

DVD: "Mind Travel Release Commemorative Free Live at the Yokohama Red Brick Warehouse 2011.06.15"
No.	Title	Length
1.	"Rollin' Days"
2.	"Wildflower"
3.	"Sunshine Sunshine"
4.	"Eyes On Me"
5.	"Beep!!"
6.	"Free Planet"
7.	"Tamashii Revolution"
8.	"Ah"
9.	"Alright!!"
