= Sunshine Sunshine =

- "Beep!!" / "Sunshine Sunshine" single cover

Single by Superfly

from the album Mind Travel
- Released: March 2, 2011
- Recorded: 2010
- Genre: Pop, rock
- Length: 4:01
- Label: Warner Music Japan
- Songwriters: Shiho Ochi, Kōichi Tabo
- Producer: Kōichi Tsutaya

Superfly singles chronology
| "Eyes on Me" (2010) | "Sunshine Sunshine" (2011) | "Beep!!" (2011) |

"Sunshine Sunshine" is a song by Japanese musical act Superfly. Written for a national radio campaign called Meet the Music, it was released as a double A-side single along with "Beep!!" in March 2011.

== Background and development ==
In March 2010, released Wildflower & Cover Songs: Complete Best 'Track 3', a 2-CD set featuring a four-track single and a full-length cover album of classic rock songs. It was led by the song "Wildflower", the theme song for the drama Gold, and also featured "Tamashii Revolution", a song used to promote the NHK broadcast of the 2010 FIFA World Cup. Both songs were commercially successful, with "Wildflower" becoming certified Platinum for downloads by the Recording Industry Association of Japan, and "Tamashii Revolution" certified platinum twice. This was followed by "Eyes on Me", a ballad single released in December used as the theme song for the Square Enix shooting game The 3rd Birthday.

"Sunshine Sunshine" was written for Meet the Music, a radio campaign by KDDI and FM radio stations across Japan. The song was released to radio in mid January, 2011. The song was written after "Beep!!", after Meet the Music campaign organizers asked Ochi to write something about music. Superfly vocalist Shiho Ochi wrote the song about what music personally meant to her, and wanted to create a song that would allow listeners to relax and unwind.

== Promotion and release ==
The song was released as a single also featuring Superfly's song "Beep!!" as the other A-side. The limited-edition version of the single featured an additional DVD, with a performance from the Superfly & The Lemon Bats Special Live "Rock'N'Roll Muncher", a three-date tour in November 2010 commissioned by Switch! music magazine to celebrate the magazine's 25th anniversary. The Lemon Bats are a group formed by Superfly, featuring Tatsuya Nakamura of Losalios, Kōichi Tsutaya, Kazuhiro Momo of Mo'Some Tonebender, Yoshiyuki Yatsuhashi and Hidekazu Hinata of Straightener.

On March 20, a concert featuring Superfly was planned for the Meet the Music campaign. Held at the Namura Hall in Okinawa, the concert was intended to be aired live on Tokyo FM, J-Wave and FM Okinawa. The concert was cancelled, due to the effects of the 2011 Tōhoku earthquake and tsunami that occurred on March 11, a week before the intended date. Due to the earthquake, Ochi uploaded an a cappella version of the song on her official blog on March 17. Later, Ochi wrote and recorded the song "You & Me" in a single day, which was released as a digital downloaded to raise money for the earthquake relief efforts.

No music video was created to promote the song.

== Critical reception ==
Tomoki Takahashi of Rockin' On Japan described the song as "warmly constructed". Compared to "Beep!!", which he felt showed Ochi as a person-willed person, Takahashi described the song as showing off Ochi as a person of emotion. Haruna Takekawa of Hot Express described the song as "country-style number played with an acoustic tone", and felt that Ochi's "refreshing and comfortable vocals" softly color the song. She noted that both "Sunshine Sunshine" and "Beep!!" were much more simple than her previous songs. CDJournal reviewers felt that the song's guitars made it into a good, rock'n'roll/country-style song. They noted the use of the accordion made the song nostalgic and heartwarming, and praised the guitar arpeggio as beautiful and impressive.

== Track listings ==
"Sunshine Sunshine" digital download
| No. | Title | Lyrics | Music | Arranger(s) | Length |
|---|---|---|---|---|---|
| 1. | "Sunshine Sunshine" | Shiho Ochi | Kōichi Tabo | Kōichi Tsutaya | 4:12 |
| Total length: | | | | | 4:12 |

"Beep!!" / "Sunshine Sunshine" single
| No. | Title | Lyrics | Music | Arranger(s) | Length |
|---|---|---|---|---|---|
| 1. | "Beep!!" | Shiho Ochi, jam | Kōichi Tabo | Kōichi Tsutaya | 4:12 |
| 2. | "Sunshine Sunshine" | S. Ochi | K. Tabo | K. Tsutaya | 4:01 |
| 3. | "Different Ways" | S. Ochi | S. Ochi | K. Tsutaya | 3:36 |
| Total length: | | | | | 12:49 |

"Beep!!" / "Sunshine Sunshine" single DVD: Superfly & The Lemon Bats "Rock'N'Roll Muncher"
| No. | Title | Length |
|---|---|---|
| 1. | "tour document" |
| 2. | "Tanjō" |
| 3. | "live rehearsal" |
| 4. | "Manifesto" |
| 5. | "back stage" |
| 6. | "Free Planet" |
| 7. | "Alright!!" |

== Personnel ==
Personnel details were sourced from the liner notes booklet of Mind Travel.

- Hideki Matsubara – bass
- Yukio Nagoshi – electric guitar
- Shiho Ochi – lead and background vocals, tambourine
- Yutaka Odawara – drums
- Yoshiaki Sato – accordion
- Kōichi Tsutaya – background vocals
- Yoshiyuki Yatsuhashi – acoustic guitar

== Charts ==
| Chart (2011) | Peak position |
|---|---|
| Japan Billboard Adult Contemporary Airplay | 1 |
| Japan Billboard Japan Hot 100 | 6 |
| Japan Oricon weekly singles: "Beep!!" / "Sunshine Sunshine" | 5 |
| Japan RIAJ Digital Track Chart | 77 |

=== Sales ===
| Chart | Amount |
|---|---|
| Oricon physical sales: "Beep!!" / "Sunshine Sunshine" | 27,000 |

== Release history ==
| Region | Date | Format | Distributing Label | Catalog codes |
|---|---|---|---|---|
| Japan | January 21, 2011 | ringtone | Warner Music Japan | |
| Japan | March 2, 2011 | digital download | Warner Music Japan | |
| Japan | March 9, 2011 | CD single, CD/DVD, digital download (EP) | Warner Music Japan | WPCL-10924, WPZL-30253/4 (DVD) |
| Japan | March 26, 2011 | Rental CD | Warner Music Japan | WPCL-10924 |
