= Roll Over the Rainbow =

- "Wildflower" single cover

Song by Superfly

from the album Wildflower & Cover Songs: Complete Best 'Track 3'
- Language: Japanese
- Released: August 25, 2010
- Recorded: 2010
- Genre: Pop, rock and roll
- Length: 4:53
- Label: Warner Music Japan
- Songwriters: Shiho Ochi, Jam, Kōichi Tabo
- Producers: Kōichi Tsutaya, Kōichi Tabo

"Roll Over the Rainbow" is a song by Japanese musical act Superfly. Released as one of the songs on "Wildflower" & Cover Songs: Complete Best 'Track 3', a four-song extended play featuring a cover album as a bonus disc in September 2010, it was used to promote the 2010 United States of Odaiba summer event, organised by Fuji Television.

== Background and development ==
In September 2009, Superfly released the act's second studio album Box Emotions, their second release in a row to reach number one on Oricon's album chart. This was followed by a single, "Dancing on the Fire", Superfly's second upbeat dance song to be used in commercials for Canon's Digital IXUS range of cameras.

On June 18, Superfly released the song "Tamashii Revolution", a song used as the theme song of the NHK broadcast of the 2010 FIFA World Cup, played during relay clips and highlight shows. It became one of Superfly's biggest commercial successes, eventually becoming certified platinum twice by the RIAJ. In July, Superfly's song "Wildflower" started airing as the theme song for the drama Boss.

== Promotion and release ==
"Roll Over the Rainbow" was one of the four tracks found on the "Wildflower" single, a special release commemorating Superfly's 10th single since their debut. Each song featured a different style of rock, and a different commercial tie-up. The single came packaged with Cover Songs: Best 'Track 3', a compilation album compiling Superfly's English language cover songs that were featured on the B-sides of her singles.

The song was first unveiled on May 29, when Superfly performed it at the 2010 MTV World Stage VMAJ. The song was made the theme song of the United States of Odaiba, an annual summer event held by Fuji Television from mid-July to the end of August. On August 31, the final day of the event, a concert featuring Superfly was held, which was broadcast live on Ustream.

The song was the only track from the "Wildflower" single not to be featured on her third studio album Mind Travel (2011). It was eventually compiled onto Superfly's greatest hits album Superfly Best in 2013. The song was performed during Superfly's 2011 arena tour Shout in the Rainbow!!, and a performance was featured on the video release in 2012.

== Music video ==
A music video was released for the song, directed by Hidenobu Tanabe. It features a mixture of stop-motion footage of moving guitars and food, as well as scenes showing Shiho Ochi in field. She sings the song while being surrounded by spinning objects such as picture frames and chairs. Later scenes show Ochi moving in stop-motion across a large keyboard, and scenes set at a beach.

== Critical reception ==
CDJournal reviewers described the song as a "red hot season loving summer party tune" and a "heart-bouncing rock'n'roll" song. They praised the "joyful" and "rolling" keyboard, "dry" guitar sound, and Ochi's tambourine. They noted the song's "open feeling", and the stirring and refreshing pop chorus as some of the high points of the composition. The reviewers likened the song to kayōkyoku-style Japanese idol music from the 1970s.

== Track listing ==
"Wildflower" single
No.	Title	Lyrics	Music	Arranger(s)	Length
1.	"Wildflower"	Shiho Ochi	Kōichi Tabo	Kōichi Tsutaya, K. Tabo	4:26
2.	"Tamashii Revolution" (タマシイレボリューション Tamashii Reboryūshon)	S. Ochi	S. Ochi	K. Tsutaya	3:46
3.	"Free Planet"	S. Ochi	K. Tabo	K. Tsutaya, K. Tabo	3:23
4.	"Roll Over the Rainbow"	S. Ochi, Jam	K. Tabo	K. Tsutaya, K. Tabo	4:53
Total length:					16:26

== Charts ==
Chart (2010)	Peak position
Japan Billboard Adult Contemporary Airplay	75
Japan RIAJ Digital Track Chart	27

== Release history ==
Region	Date	Format	Distributing Label
Japan	August 3, 2010	ringtone	Warner Music Japan
Japan	August 25, 2010	digital download (cellphone)	Warner Music Japan
Japan	September 1, 2010	digital download (PC)	Warner Music Japan
