= Cover Songs: Complete Best 'Track 3' =

- iTunes LP cover for Cover Songs: Complete Best 'Track 3'

Compilation album by Superfly
- Released: September 1, 2010
- Recorded: 2007–2010
- Genre: Pop, rock
- Length: 59:10
- Language: English
- Label: Warner Music Japan

Superfly chronology
Box Emotions (2009)	Cover Songs: Complete Best 'Track 3' (2010)	Mind Travel (2011)

Alternative cover
- Wildflower & Cover Songs: Complete Best 'Track 3' set cover.

Singles from Cover Songs
- 1. "(You Make Me Feel Like) A Natural Woman" Released: March 31, 2010

Cover Songs: Complete Best 'Track 3' is an album by Japanese musical unit Superfly. Released September 1, 2010, the album was packaged as a 2-CD set with Superfly's single "Wildflower", and compiled Western classic rock songs found on Superfly's singles.

== Background and development ==
Vocalist Shiho Ochi first heard 1960s and 1970s classic rock songs when she was 18, after meeting band-mate Kōichi Tabo, who used to give her MiniDisc mix-tapes with his favorite songs on them as presents. During Superfly's early days as a musical act in Aichi the band did not have a chance to record covers, but started a cover recording project before their major label debut with Warner. Originally Superfly planned to include these covers as the final tracks on their albums, but instead decided it would be better to include these songs as the third tracks on their single releases.

Ochi found singing in English difficult because she does not speak the language, so spent a lot of time checking pronunciation during her early covers. Often she found that performing the songs as straight covers did not suit her voice, such as on Free's "My Brother Jake". Instead, producer Kōichi Tsutaya suggested they make the recordings as fun as possible. For the cover of The Rolling Stones' "Bitch", Superfly collaborated with drummer Kazuyuki Kuhara of the bands Thee Michelle Gun Elephant and The Birthday, as well as trumpeter Tabu Zombie and saxophonist Motoharu of Soil & "Pimp" Sessions.

After a while, Ochi found that recording covers became less fun and more an obligation, so Superfly decided to stop the project and compile these into an album.

== Promotion and release ==
The album compiles the Western cover songs released as B-sides on Superfly's singles between 2007 and 2009, often as the singles' third tracks. In addition, the album includes all of the songs from the iTunes exclusive Live from Tokyo extended play that was released in 2007, as well as the recording of Janis Joplin's "Piece of My Heart" from Superfly's Dancing at Budokan!! video album and three new songs.

Superfly's cover of "(You Make Me Feel Like) A Natural Woman", originally released on the "Dancing on the Fire" (2009) single, was used as the theme song for the film Tokyo-jima. It was released as a stand-alone digital download on March 31, 2010. Superfly performed "(You Make Me Feel Like) A Natural Woman" at Bokura no Ongaku on April 2, 2010, alongside singers Miho Fukuhara and MiChi. Superfly's cover of Elvin Bishop's 1976 song "Fooled Around and Fell in Love", was used in the drama Gold as an incidental song, alongside the theme song "Wildflower", also performed by Superfly.

On September 15, Wildflower & Cover Songs: Complete Best 'Track 3' was released as an iTunes LP, the first such download released by a Japanese artist.

== Critical reception ==
Hirokazu Koike of Rockin' On Japan described listening to the album like attending a rock festival, and felt that Ochi sung the 1960s and 70s classic rock and soul songs magnificently. CDJournal reviewers felt that "Fooled Around and Fell in Love" was sung with "magnificent presence", that benefited from the "bewitching" horn and "wild" guitar. "(You Make Me Feel Like) A Natural Woman" was praised for its simple "country" arrangement that focused on Ochi's "soulfully shining" vocals. The reviewers felt that Ochi was not as strong vocally as Aretha Franklin, however were impressed with the style of Ochi's vocals, feeling that all impurities had been removed from it.

For "(Please Not) One More Time", CDJournal reviewers felt that Ochi's "pretending not to know" vocals were fun, and that the piano in "Late for the Sky" was "elegant". They felt that Ochi's vocals in "Late for the Sky" were "contoured" and "calm", and that her final falsetto was "beautiful". For Superfly's Janis Joplin cover, the reviewers praised her "passionate" vocals, feeling that Ochi repeating "come on" left a strong impression at the end.

== Track listing ==
Cover Songs: Complete Best 'Track 3' album
No.	Title	Writer(s)	Originating release	Length
1.	"Fooled Around and Fell in Love" (by Elvin Bishop)	E. Bishop		3:49
2.	"(You Make Me Feel Like) A Natural Woman" (by Aretha Franklin)	Jerry Wexler/Carole King/Gerry Goffin	"Dancing on the Fire" (2009)	3:19
3.	"Hot 'n' Nasty" (by Humble Pie)	Steve Marriott	"Hello Hello" (2007)	3:32
4.	"(Please Not) One More Time" (by Roger McGuinn)	Al Kooper	"Manifesto" (2007)	3:26
5.	"Rhiannon" (by Fleetwood Mac)	Stevie Nicks	"Ai o Komete Hanataba o" (2008)	5:03
6.	"Honky Tonk Women (Live)" (by the Rolling Stones)	Keith Richards	Live from Tokyo (2007) & "Hi-Five" (2008)	3:19
7.	"Bad, Bad Leroy Brown (Live)" (by Jim Croce)	J. Croce	Live from Tokyo (2007) & "Hi-Five" (2008)	3:11
8.	"Heart of Gold (Live)" (by Neil Young)	N. Young	Live from Tokyo (2007)	3:25
9.	"Desperado (Live)" (by the Eagles)	Don Henley	Live from Tokyo (2007) & "Hi-Five" (2008)	3:36
10.	"My Brother Jake" (by Free)	Paul Rodgers	"How Do I Survive?" (2008)	3:19
11.	"Rock and Roll Hoochie Koo" (by Rick Derringer)	R. Derringer	"My Best of My Life" (2009)	3:41
12.	"Late for the Sky" (by Jackson Browne)	J. Browne	"Koisuru Hitomi wa Utsukushii" / "Yasashii Kimochi de" (2009)	5:35
13.	"Piece of My Heart (Live)" (by Janis Joplin)	Bert Berns	Dancing at Budokan!! (2010)	4:38
14.	"Bitch" (by the Rolling Stones)	K. Richards		4:25
15.	"The Water Is Wide" (by Karla Bonoff)	Pete Seeger		5:00
Total length:				59:10

Bonus CD
No.	Title	Writer(s)	Length
1.	"Fooled Around and Fell in Love (Acoustic Ver.)"	E. Bishop	3:38
Total length:			3:38

== Charts and certifications ==
All positions and sales refer to the album as a part of the Wildflower & Cover Songs: Complete Best 'Track 3' set.

Chart (2010)	Peak position
Japan Oricon weekly albums	1

=== Sales and certifications ===
Chart	Amount
Oricon physical sales	369,000
RIAJ physical certification	Platinum (250,000+)

== Release history ==
Region	Date	Format	Distributing Label	Catalog codes
Japan	September 1, 2010	2CD, 3CD	Warner Music Japan	WPCL-10855, WPCL-10858
Japan	September 15, 2010	digital download	Warner Music Japan	
Japan	September 18, 2010	Rental CD	Warner Music Japan	WPCL-10858
