= Live from Tokyo =

Live from Tokyo may refer to

- Live from Tokyo (album), an album by The Flying Burrito Brothers
- Live from Tokyo (EP), an EP by Superfly
