= Mind Travel =

Studio album by Superfly
- Released: June 15, 2011
- Recorded: 2009–2011
- Genre: Pop-rock, blues
- Length: 55:52
- Label: Warner Music Japan
- Producer: Kōichi Tsutaya

Superfly chronology
Cover Songs: Complete Best 'Track 3' (2010)	Mind Travel (2011)	Force (2012)

Singles from Mind Travel
- 1. "Wildflower" Released: September 1, 2010; 2. "Eyes on Me" Released: December 15, 2010; 3. "Sunshine Sunshine" Released: March 2, 2011; 4. "Beep!!" Released: March 9, 2011; 5. "Rollin' Days" Released: May 18, 2011; 6. "Ah" Released: June 1, 2011

Mind Travel is the third studio album by Japanese pop-rock band Superfly, the first studio album from the group fronted by Shiho Ochi in nearly two years. The record features guest musicians from Beat Crusaders, Losalios, and Mo'Some Tonebender, and the limited-edition version of the album includes a DVD with 10 music videos from songs on the album. The album will be supported by Superfly's "Mind Traveler" national tour.

In the first day of its release, Mind Travel reached the top of the Japan iTunes Store album charts and it sold over 52,000 physical copies according to the Oricon, placing at the top of its daily album ranking. It eventually sold over 166,000 copies in its first week, becoming Superfly's fourth consecutive album to debut at the top of the Oricon's charts, a feat not matched by a female artist since Hikaru Utada's release of Utada Hikaru Single Collection Vol. 1 in 2004. Mind Travel also topped Billboard's Japan Top Albums list, making it her third consecutive album to debut at number one on those charts. (Note: Superfly's 2010 release "Wildflower" & Cover Songs: Complete Best 'Track 3' was classified as an album on the Oricon's charts but as a single by the band and by Billboard.) Mind Travel was certified platinum by the RIAJ in June 2011. It also reached the number 3 spot for the Oricon's Monthly Album Chart for June 2011, and then dropped to 8 on the July 2011 Monthly Charts.

== Overview ==
Mind Travel's lead track "Rollin' Days" is used as the theme song for the second season of Fuji Television's BOSS drama, and it was released to digital download stores on May 18, 2011. "Rollin' Days" was subsequently charted as the number 1 song on Billboard's Adult Contemporary Airplay charts. A promotional rental single featuring a cappella song "Ah" along with a digest preview of the 14 songs on the album was distributed starting May 14, 2011.

Superfly's 9th single "Dancing on the Fire" and the track "Roll Over the Rainbow" from the group's 10th single "Wildflower" are not featured on the album, but the songs' music videos are featured on the first pressing DVD. The charity song "You & Me" is also absent.

A social networking campaign called "Superfly Mind Traveler's Circle" was set up on May 20, 2011, tied in with Twitter. Users can preview songs off of the album, watch music videos, and receive special additions to their Twitter avatars by tweeting about the songs.

To celebrate the album's release, Superfly held a free concert at the Yokohama Red Brick Warehouse. The concert was also broadcast live via Ustream.tv on June 15, 2011, at 20:00 JST. The concert had 20,000 attendees, listening to 9 songs off of the album. A recording of the concert along with an interview will air on as a special WOWOW on August 16, 2011.

"Morris" was performed live on June 19, 2011, for Father's Day on Tokyo FM, as she wrote the song with memories of her father in mind.

== Track listing ==
No.	Title	Lyrics	Music	Arrangement	Length
1.	"Rollin' Days"	Shiho Ochi	Kōichi Tabo	Kōichi Tsutaya, K. Tabo	4:00
2.	"Beep!!"	S. Ochi, jam	K. Tabo	K. Tsutaya, K. Tabo	4:13
3.	"Fly to the Moon"	S. Ochi	K. Tabo	K. Tsutaya, K. Tabo	4:31
4.	"Tamashii Revolution" (Extended ver.)	S. Ochi	S. Ochi	K. Tsutaya	4:06
5.	"Eyes on Me"	S. Ochi	K. Tabo	K. Tsutaya, K. Tabo	4:32
6.	"Deep-sea Fish Orchestra"	S. Ochi	K. Tabo	K. Tsutaya, K. Tabo	4:23
7.	"Secret Garden"	S. Ochi	K. Tabo	K. Tsutaya, K. Tabo	4:40
8.	"Sunshine Sunshine"	S. Ochi	K. Tabo	K. Tsutaya, K. Tabo	4:04
9.	"Morris"	S. Ochi, K. Tabo	K. Tabo	K. Tsutaya, K. Tabo	2:49
10.	"Wildflower"	S. Ochi	K. Tabo	K. Tsutaya, K. Tabo	4:25
11.	"Free Planet"	S. Ochi	K. Tabo	K. Tsutaya, K. Tabo	3:21
12.	"Happy Nightmare" ("The Nightmare & Rock'n'Roll" (悪夢とロックンロール, Akumu to Rokkunrōru))	S. Ochi	K. Tabo	K. Tsutaya, K. Tabo	2:51
13.	"Only You"	S. Ochi	S. Ochi	K. Tsutaya	4:25
14.	"Ah"	S. Ochi	K. Tabo	K. Tsutaya, K. Tabo	3:32
Total length:					55:52

First pressing DVD
No.	Title	Length
1.	"Dancing on the Fire"
2.	"Roll Over the Rainbow"
3.	"Rollin' Days"
4.	"Beep!!"
5.	"Tamashii Revolution"
6.	"Eyes on Me"
7.	"Morris"
8.	"Wildflower"
9.	"Free Planet"
10.	"Ah"

== Personnel ==
Personnel details were sourced from the liner notes booklet of Mind Travel.

- Aico – background vocal (#14)
- Mika Arisaka – background vocal (#14)
- Shinji Asakura – percussion (#3, #7)
- Can'no – background vocal (#14)
- Luz Fonte – background vocal (#14)
- Mikio Hirama – electric guitar (#2, #4, #11–12)
- Binkoh Izawa – background vocal (#14)
- Gen Ittetsu Stringss – strings (#5–6, #10)
- Junear – background vocal (#14)
- Jon Kasagi – background vocal (#14)
- Teppei Kawakami – trumpet (#3)
- Noriyasu "Kaasuke" Kawamura – drums (#1, #3)
- Armin T. Linzbichler – drums (#13)
- Maseeeta – drums (#6)
- Hideki Matsubara – bass (#3, #5, #8, #10)
- Hiroshi "Matsukichi" Matsubara – drums (#4), percussion (#4. #12)
- Frances Maya – background vocal (#14)
- Kazuhiro Momo – second vocals (#12)
- Yōichi Murata – trombone (#4, #13)
- Yukio Nagoshi – electric guitar (#8, #10)
- Miku Nakamura – background vocal (#14)
- Tatsuya Nakamura – drums (#11)
- Yūsuke Nakano – trumpet (#3)
- Kōji Nishimura – trumpet (#13)
- Shiho Ochi – lead and background vocals, tambourine (#1–2, #8, #10), cowbell (#1, #4), glockenspiel (#5), vibraphone (#5), wind chime (#5)
- Yutaka Odawara – drums (#2, #8, #10)
- Takumi Ogasawara – drums (#7)
- Yuchi Ohata – acoustic guitar (#9)
- Haruko Ōhinata – background vocals (#13–14)
- Tomohiko Ohkanda – bass (#7, #13)
- Rung Hyang – background vocal (#14)
- San (Chagra) – background vocal (#14)
- Shirō Sasaki – trumpet (#7)
- Takayuki Sasaki – electric guitar (#3, #7)
- Katsuhiko Satō – acoustic guitar (#9)
- Yoshiaki Sato – accordion (#8–9)
- Hiroko Satoh – background vocal (#14)
- Kaori Sawada – background vocal (#14)
- Hironori Sawano – trumpet (#7)
- Yūji Shimoda> – trombone (#7)
- Masayuki Shioda – background vocal (#14)
- Satoshi Shōji – oboe (#5)
- Masahiko Sugasaka – trumpet (#4)
- Sunny – piano (#12)
- Kōichi Tabo – electric guitar (Open-G turning) (#1)
- Kiyoshi Takakuwa – bass (#1)
- Hideyo Takakuwa – flute (#5)
- Kenichi Takemoto – background vocals (#13–14)
- Masakuni Takeno – alto sax (#4)
- Satoru Takeshima – flute (#3)
- Maiko Takeshita – background vocal (#14)
- Tama (Chagra) – background vocal (#14)
- Mayuka Tanaka – background vocal (#14)
- Mitsuru Tanaka – trumpet (#3)
- Yoshito Tanaka – electric guitar (#13)
- Yukiko Tanaka – background vocal (#14)
- Takeshi Taneda – bass (#4, #11–12)
- Yuichi Togashiki – drums (#5)
- Tokie – bass (#2)
- Shunsuke Tsuri – additional arrangement (#11)
- Kōichi Tsutaya – hammond B-3 (#1, #11), background vocals (#1, #6, #8), piano (#3–5, #14), programming (#4, #14) rhodes (#7, #13)
- Hajime Yamamoto – alto & tenor sax (#7)
- Masashi Yamamoto – bass (#6)
- Takuo Yamamoto – baritone sax (#13), tenor sax (#4, #13)
- Yoshiyuki Yatsuhashi – acoustic guitar (#5, #8), electric guitar (#1–6, #10–12), mandolin (#10)
- Hitoshi Yokoyama – trumpet (#4)
- Osamu Yoshida – alto sax (#7)
- Yūho Yoshioka – background vocal (#14)

== Oricon Sales Chart ==
Release	Oricon chart	Peak position	Debut sales	Sales total
June 15, 2011	Daily Albums Chart	1	52,465	316,367
June 15, 2011	Weekly Albums Chart	1	166,473	316,367
June 15, 2011	Monthly Albums Chart	3	231,384	316,367
June 15, 2011	Yearly Albums Chart	14		316,367
