= Free Planet =

- "Wildflower" single cover

Song by Superfly

from the album Mind Travel
- Language: Japanese
- Released: September 8, 2010
- Recorded: 2010
- Genre: rock and roll
- Length: 4:53
- Label: Warner Music Japan
- Songwriters: Shiho Ochi, Kōichi Tabo
- Producer: Kōichi Tsutaya

"Free Planet" is a song by Japanese musical act Superfly. Released as one of the songs on "Wildflower" & Cover Songs: Complete Best 'Track 3', a four-song extended play featuring a cover album as a bonus disc in September 2010, it was used in a high-profile commercial campaign for Sony Ericsson cellphones.

== Background and development ==
In September 2009, Superfly released the act's second studio album Box Emotions, their second release in a row to reach number one on Oricon's album chart. This was followed by a single, "Dancing on the Fire", Superfly's second upbeat dance song to be used in commercials for Canon's Digital IXUS range of cameras.

On June 18, Superfly released the song "Tamashii Revolution", a song used as the theme song of the NHK broadcast of the 2010 FIFA World Cup, played during relay clips and highlight shows. It became one of Superfly's biggest commercial successes, eventually becoming certified platinum twice by the RIAJ. In July, Superfly's song "Wildflower" started airing as the theme song for the drama Boss.

The single's jacket features vocalist Shiho Ochi holding a different object representing each song on the single: a dahlia flower for "Wildflower", a djembe drum for "Tamashii Revolution", a globe for "Free Planet" and on the back cover a rainbow for "Roll Over the Rainbow".

The song was written as a message song by vocalist Shiho Ochi, about how if a person does not make any barriers, they can go anywhere. It was recorded in a live take, with musicians such as drummer Tatsuya Nakamura and former Tokyo Jihen member Mikio Hirama.

== Promotion and release ==
"Free Planet" was one of the four tracks found on the "Wildflower" single, a special release commemorating Superfly's 10th single since their debut. Each song featured a different style of rock, and a different commercial tie-up. The single came packaged with Cover Songs: Best 'Track 3', a compilation album compiling Superfly's English language cover songs that were featured on the B-sides of her singles.

The song was used in commercials for Sony Ericsson phones in 2010, including the Bravia Phone S004, and was specifically written for the commercial. As one of the four A-sides of the "Wildflower" single and Cover Songs: Complete Best 'Track 3' set, it reached number one on the Oricon albums chart in 2010.

The song was later featured on the album Mind Travel (2011). It was first performed live during Rock'N'Roll Muncher, a special live with a group called the Lemon Bats formed by Superfly in November 2010. The performance was featured on the DVD of the "Beep!!" / "Sunshine Sunshine" single in March 2011. The song was performed again during the Mind Travel Release Commemorative Free Live at the Yokohama Red Brick Warehouse on June 15, 2011, footage of which was shown on the "Ai o Kurae" (2011) single's DVD. The song was performed during Superfly's 2011 arena tour Shout in the Rainbow!!, and during the Live Force tour in 2012.

== Music video ==
A music video was released for the song, directed by Shuichi Banba. It is made up of recording studio footage, altered to look like a video taken in the 1960s, with additional effects such as lasers, pencil-drawn triangle art and space imagery.

== Critical reception ==
CDJournal reviewers felt the song's simple beat created a "striking" rock'n' roll-style song. They praised Ochi's "refreshing", "attacking" and varying vocals, in particular the chorus. Many of the instruments were also praised, including the "dancing" guitars and hammond organ, however Tatsuya Nakamura's drums were singled out as "wild and tight", and what pull the song together. The reviewers further noted the contrasting of long tone melodies were a fun part of the song.

== Track listing ==
"Wildflower" single
No.	Title	Lyrics	Music	Arranger(s)	Length
1.	"Wildflower"	Shiho Ochi	Kōichi Tabo	Kōichi Tsutaya, K. Tabo	4:26
2.	"Tamashii Revolution" (タマシイレボリューション Tamashii Reboryūshon)	S. Ochi	S. Ochi	K. Tsutaya	3:46
3.	"Free Planet"	S. Ochi	K. Tabo	K. Tsutaya, K. Tabo	3:23
4.	"Roll Over the Rainbow"	S. Ochi, Jam	K. Tabo	K. Tsutaya, K. Tabo	4:53
Total length:					16:26

== Personnel ==
Personnel details were sourced from the liner notes booklet of Mind Travel.

- Mikio Hirama – electric guitar
- Tatsuya Nakamura – drums
- Shiho Ochi – lead and background vocals
- Takeshi Taneda – bass
- Shunsuke Tsuri – additional arrangement
- Kōichi Tsutaya – hammond B-3
- Yoshiyuki Yatsuhashi – electric guitar

== Release history ==
Region	Date	Format	Distributing Label
Japan	September 7, 2010	digital download	Warner Music Japan
