= Beep!! =

- "Beep!!" / "Sunshine Sunshine" single cover

Single by Superfly

from the album Mind Travel
- Released: March 9, 2011
- Recorded: 2010
- Genre: Pop, rock
- Length: 4:12
- Label: Warner Music Japan
- Songwriters: Shiho Ochi, Kōichi Tabo, Jam
- Producer: Kōichi Tsutaya

Superfly singles chronology
"Sunshine Sunshine" (2011)	"Beep!!" (2011)	"Rollin' Days" (2011)

"Beep!!" is a song by Japanese musical act Superfly. It was released as a double A-side single along with "Sunshine Sunshine" in 2011, and was used as the theme song for the Hiroshi Shinagawa film Manzai Gang (2011).

== Background and development ==
In March 2010, Superfly released Wildflower & Cover Songs: Complete Best 'Track 3', a two-CD set featuring a four-track single and a full-length cover album of classic rock songs. It was led by the song "Wildflower", the theme song for the drama Gold, and also featured "Tamashii Revolution", a song used to promote the NHK broadcast of the 2010 FIFA World Cup. Both songs were commercially successful, with "Wildflower" becoming certified Platinum for downloads by the Recording Industry Association of Japan, and "Tamashii Revolution" certified platinum twice. This was followed by "Eyes on Me", a ballad single released in December used as the theme song for the Square Enix shooting game The 3rd Birthday.

"Beep!!" was written before "Sunshine Sunshine". Director Hiroshi Shinagawa wanted a Superfly song similar to the "high-paced feel" of "Alright!!" (2009) for the theme song for his film Manzai Gang (2011), so asked Ochi to write the theme song. Ochi was inspired to write about feelings of change after reading the script for the film and meeting with Shinagawa. Conceptually, the song was recorded with the style of American rock band The Knack as a basis. Ochi wrote the lyrics together with musician Jam. At the time Ochi had wanted to write tender love songs such as "Eyes on Me", so had trouble mentally creating the lyrics. Together they wrote the song from the perspective of a big-sister like character, much like the lyrics of Superfly's song "Manifesto".

== Promotion and release ==
"Beep!!" was announced as the theme song for the Hiroshi Shinagawa film Manzai Gang in late December, 2011. Superfly intended to perform "Beep!!" live at Music Station on March 11, 2011, however the program was cancelled due to the 2011 Tōhoku earthquake and tsunami.

The song was released as a single also featuring Superfly's song "Sunshine Sunshine" as the other A-side. The limited-edition version of the single featured an additional DVD, with a performance from the Superfly & The Lemon Bats Special Live "Rock'N'Roll Muncher", a three-date tour in November 2010 commissioned by Switch! music magazine to celebrate the magazine's 25th anniversary. The Lemon Bats are a group formed by Superfly, featuring Tatsuya Nakamura of Losalios, Kōichi Tsutaya, Kazuhiro Momo of Mo'Some Tonebender, Yoshiyuki Yatsuhashi and Hidekazu Hinata of Straightener.

== Music video ==
A music video was produced for the song, directed by Wataru Saitō. The video begins in a bedroom set, featuring an indoor apple tree. Further scenes depict vocalist Shiho Ochi outside turning a fake pig on a spit, driving in a car surrounded by police men and her walking along train tracks. The police men are featured in later scenes shot at night, where they perform a dance routine.

== Critical reception ==
Haruna Takekawa of Hot Express praised the song's heavy, simple riffs and edgy guitar sound, and noted Ochi's voice was powerful and full. She felt that the song had strong imagery of a woman with long hair driving wildly in a convertible. She noted that both "Sunshine Sunshine" and "Beep!!" were much more simple than her previous songs. CDJournal reviewers described the song as a "wild rock tune" centred on hard rock-style guitar riffs. They praised Superfly's vocals as "excellent" and being the heart of the song, and felt that sound developed by the intertwining drums and guitars was "thrilling". Tomoki Takahashi of Rockin' On Japan focused on the song's powerful chorus, and praised Ochi's vocals. He felt that the song showed Ochi as a strong-willed person, and was indicative of her ever-changing style of music.

== Track listing ==
"Beep!!" / "Sunshine Sunshine" single
No.	Title	Lyrics	Music	Arranger(s)	Length
1.	"Beep!!"	Shiho Ochi, Jam	Kōichi Tabo	Kōichi Tsutaya	4:12
2.	"Sunshine Sunshine"	S. Ochi	K. Tabo	K. Tsutaya	4:01
3.	"Different Ways"	S. Ochi	S. Ochi	K. Tsutaya	3:36
Total length:					12:49

"Beep!!" / "Sunshine Sunshine" single DVD: Superfly & The Lemon Bats "Rock'N'Roll Muncher"
No.	Title	Length
1.	"tour document"
2.	"Tanjō"
3.	"live rehearsal"
4.	"Manifesto"
5.	"back stage"
6.	"Free Planet"
7.	"Alright!!"

== Personnel ==
Personnel details were sourced from the liner notes booklet of Mind Travel.

- Mikio Hirama – electric guitar
- Yutaka Odawara – drums
- Shiho Ochi – lead and background vocals, tambourine
- Tokie – bass
- Yoshiyuki Yatsuhashi – electric guitar

== Chart rankings ==
Chart (2011)	Peak position
Japan Billboard Adult Contemporary Airplay	14
Japan Billboard Japan Hot 100	5
Japan Oricon weekly singles: "Beep!!" / "Sunshine Sunshine"	5
Japan RIAJ Digital Track Chart	29

=== Sales ===
Chart	Amount
Oricon physical sales: "Beep!!" / "Sunshine Sunshine"	27,000

== Release history ==
Region	Date	Format	Distributing Label	Catalog codes
Japan	March 9, 2011	CD single, CD/DVD, digital download	Warner Music Japan	WPCL-10924, WPZL-30253/4 (DVD)
Japan	March 26, 2011	Rental CD	Warner Music Japan	WPCL-10924
