= Eyes on Me (Superfly song) =

Single by Superfly

from the album Mind Travel
- Released: December 15, 2010
- Recorded: 2010
- Genre: J-Pop, rock
- Length: 11:58
- Label: Warner Music Japan
- Songwriters: Shiho Ochi, Kōichi Tabo

Superfly singles chronology
"Wildflower" (2010)	"Eyes on Me" (2010)	"Sunshine Sunshine" (2011)

"Eyes on Me" is the eleventh single by Japanese recording artist Superfly, released on December 15, 2010. The title track, described as a "classic winter ballad" (冬の王道バラード, fuyu no ōdō barādo), is used as the theme song for the PlayStation Portable game The 3rd Birthday. The single was released as a standard CD release and a limited edition CD+DVD bundle. "Rescue Me" and "Prima Donna" serve as the single's B-sides. The DVD included with the first pressings of the single features an "Official Bootleg Live DVD" of Superfly's performance at the Monster Bash 2010 music festival on August 23, 2010. "Eyes on Me" has since been nominated for the 2011 Space Shower Music Video Award for best female video.

== Track listing ==
CD single
No.	Title	Lyrics	Music	Arranger(s)	Length
1.	"Eyes On Me"	Shiho Ochi	Kōichi Tabo	Kōichi Tsutaya	4:34
2.	"Rescue Me"	S. Ochi	K. Tabo	Kōichi Tsutaya	4:11
3.	"Prima donna" (プリマドンナ, Purima donna)	S. Ochi	S. Ochi, K. Tabo	Kōichi Tsutaya	3:15
Total length:					12:00

DVD Official Bootleg "Live at MONSTER baSH 2010"
No.	Title	Length
1.	"Alright!!"
2.	"How Do I Survive?"
3.	"Wildflower"
4.	"Free Planet"
5.	"Tamashii Revolution"
6.	"Dancing on the Fire"

== Personnel ==
Personnel details were sourced from the liner notes booklet of Mind Travel.

- Tomoyuki Asakawa – harp
- Gen Ittetsu Strings – strings
- Hideki Matsubara – bass
- Shiho Ochi – lead and background vocals, glockenspiel, vibraphone, wind chime
- Satoshi Shōji – oboe
- Hideyo Takakuwa – flute
- Yuichi Togashiki – drums
- Kōichi Tsutaya – piano
- Yoshiyuki Yatsuhashi – acoustic guitar, electric guitar

== Charts and sales ==
Chart (2010)	Peak position
Billboard Adult Contemporary Airplay	3
Billboard Japan Hot 100	2
Oricon daily singles	4
Oricon weekly singles	5

=== Reported sales and certifications ===
Chart	Amount
Oricon physical sales	21,000
