= Superfly (Superfly album) =

Studio album by Superfly
- Released: May 14, 2008
- Recorded: 2007–2008
- Genre: J-pop
- Length: 52:10
- Label: Warner Japan
- Producer: Koichi Tsutaya; Koichi Tabo; The Vice Lords; Rui Momoda; Motoki Matsuoka

Superfly chronology
Live from Tokyo (2007)	Superfly (2008)	Box Emotions (2009)

Singles from Superfly
- 1. "Hello Hello" Released: June 6, 2007; 2. "Manifesto" Released: August 1, 2007; 3. "I Spy I Spy" Released: November 28, 2007; 4. "Ai o Komete Hanataba o" Released: February 27, 2008; 5. "Hi-Five" Released: April 23, 2008

Superfly is the debut studio album by Japanese band Superfly, released on May 14, 2008, via Warner Music Japan. Approximately 391,182 copies have been sold in Japan and is certified Double Platinum by the RIAJ for the shipment of 500,000 copies. On the iTunes Store, a special remix of "Manifesto" by Ram Rider was included.

Superfly debuted at number 1 on the Oricon's weekly album charts; the last time a female artist had their first album debut at number 1 was Tina's Colorado in 1999.

== Track listing ==
Superfly track listing
No.	Title	Writer(s)	Producer(s)	Length
1.	"Hi-Five"	Shiho Ochi; Jam; Koichi Tabo	Koichi Tsutaya; Tabo	3:59
2.	"Manifesto" (マニフェスト)	Ochi; Tabo	Tabo	4:00
3.	"1969"	Ochi; Tabo	Motoki Matsuoka; Tabo	3:16
4.	"Ai o Komete Hanataba o" (愛をこめて花束を)	Ochi; Tabo; Junji Ishiwatari	Tsutaya	4:56
5.	"Ain't No Crybaby"	Ochi; Tabo	Tsutaya; Tabo	3:16
6.	"Oh My Precious Time"	Ochi; Tabo	Tsutaya; Tabo	4:36
7.	"Vancouver" (バンクーバー)	Bun Onoe; Tabo	Rui Momoda; Tabo	4:03
8.	"I Spy I Spy" (with Jet)	Ochi; Chris Cester; Tabo; Mark Wilson	The Vice Lords	3:37
9.	"Uso to Romance" (嘘とロマンス)	Ochi; Tabo	Tsutaya	3:46
10.	"Ai to Kansha" (愛と感謝)	Ochi; Tabo	Matsuoka; Tabo	4:26
11.	"Hello Hello" (ハロー・ハロー)	Ochi; Tabo	Tabo	3:53
12.	"Last Love Song"	Ochi	Ochi	3:33
13.	"I Remember"	Ochi; Tabo	Tsutaya	5:00
Total length:				52:21

iTunes bonus track
No.	Title	Writer(s)	Producer(s)	Length
14.	"Manifesto" (Ram Rider Remix)	Ochi; Tabo	Tabo	4:07

DVD
No.	Title	Length
1.	"Hello Hello" (music video)
2.	"Manifesto" (music video)
3.	"I Spy I Spy" (with Jet) (music video)
4.	"Ai o Komete Hanataba o" (music video)
5.	"Hi-Five" (music video)
Total length:		21:00

== Charts ==
2008 chart performance for Superfly
Chart (2008)	Peak position
Japanese Albums (Oricon)	1

2015 chart performance for Superfly
Chart (2015)	Peak position
Japanese Hot Albums (Billboard Japan)	68

== Certifications ==
Certifications and sales for Superfly
Region	Certification	Certified units/sales
Japan (RIAJ)	2× Platinum	500,000^{^}
^{^} Shipments figures based on certification alone.
