= Gold (TV series) =

- Written by: Shinji Nojima
- Directed by: Shunsaku Kawake; Yūsuke Katō; Yūsuke Ishii
- Starring: Yūki Amami; Masami Nagasawa; Takashi Sorimachi
- Ending theme: "Wildflower" by Superfly
- Country of origin: Japan
- No. of episodes: 11

Production
- Running time: 54 minutes

Original release
- Network: Fuji TV
- Release: July 8 – September 16, 2010

Gold is a 2010 Japanese television drama series with 11 episodes that aired from July 8 to September 16.

== Cast ==
=== Main ===
- Yūki Amami as Yūri Saotome
- Masami Nagasawa as Rika Nīkura
- Tori Matsuzaka as Kō Saotome
- Emi Takei as Akira Saotome
- Takashi Sorimachi as Jōji Hasumi

=== Guest ===
- Susumu Terajima as Tatsuya Akashi
- Gō Ayano as Yōsuke Utsugi
- Haru as Ryōko Shiina
- Nao Minamisawa as Maiko Jindai

Preceded by Sunao ni Narenakute; April 15, 2010 – June 24, 2010	Fuji TV Mokuyō Gekijō Drama; July 8, 2010 – September 16, 2010	Succeeded by Iryū: Team Medical Dragon 3 October 14, 2010 – December 16, 2010
