= Live from Tokyo (EP) =

EP by Superfly
- Released: June 27, 2007
- Recorded: Shibuya Apple Store on June 6, 2007
- Genre: J-pop
- Length: 13:28
- Label: Warner Music Japan
- Producer: Koichi Tsutaya

Superfly chronology
Live from Tokyo (2007)	Superfly (2008)

Live from Tokyo is a live EP by Japanese band Superfly, performed at the Shibuya Apple Store on June 6, 2007, and then released exclusively to the iTunes Store on June 27. It was one of the earliest Live from Tokyo albums released to the iTunes Store in Japan. It consists of covers of four rock songs from the late 1960s and early 1970s. The tracks (except for "Heart of Gold") were subsequently released as B-sides to the group's single "Hi-Five". All four songs are included on the second disc of the "Wildflower & Cover Songs: Complete Best 'Track 3'" single.

== Track list ==
No.	Title	Writer(s)	Original artist	Length
1.	"Honky Tonk Women"	Mick Jagger, Keith Richards	The Rolling Stones	3:19
2.	"Heart of Gold"	Neil Young	Neil Young	3:25
3.	"Bad, Bad Leroy Brown"	Jim Croce	Jim Croce	3:11
4.	"Desperado"	Glenn Frey, Don Henley	Eagles	3:36
Total length:				13:28
