= I Spy I Spy =

Single by Superfly × Jet

from the album Superfly
- Released: November 28, 2007
- Recorded: 2007
- Genre: Pop, rock
- Label: Warner Music Japan (WPCL-10441)
- Songwriter(s): Chris Cester, Mark Wilson and Superfly
- Producer(s): The Vice Lords (Chris Cester&Mark Wilson)

Superfly singles chronology
"Manifesto" (2007)	"I Spy I Spy" (2007)	"Ai o Komete Hanataba o" (2008)

Jet singles chronology
"Shine On" (2006)	"I Spy I Spy" (2007)	"The Wild One" (2008)

Music video
- "i spy i spy" at YouTube

"I Spy I Spy" (stylized as "i spy i spy") is a collaboration single by Japanese artist Superfly and Australian band Jet that was released in the name of "Superfly×JET" to the Japanese market on November 28, 2007. Superfly travelled to Sydney to record the song with Jet.

It reached 55th place on the Oricon weekly singles chart and charted for seven weeks. "I Spy I Spy" was used in a commercial for the Nissan Cube. It is the first single that does not feature Superfly's guitarist Kōichi Tabo.

== Track listing ==
All tracks are written by Chris Cester, Mark Wilson and Superfly.

CD
No.	Title	Length
1.	"I Spy I Spy"
2.	"I Spy I Spy" (Instrumental)
