= You & Me (Superfly song) =

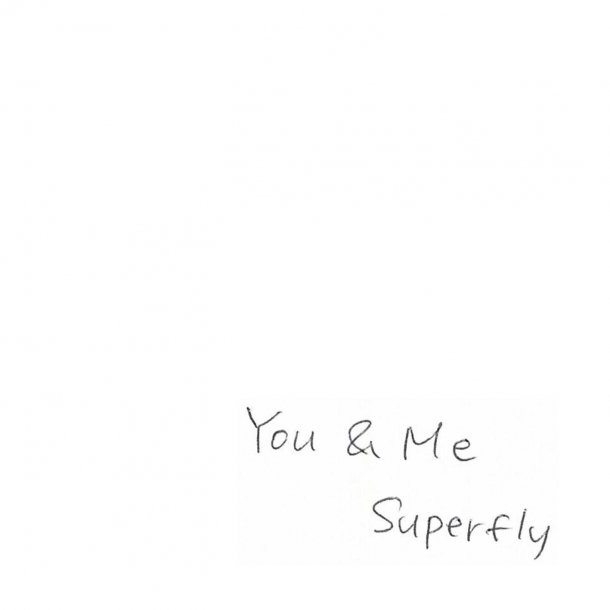

Song by Superfly
- Released: March 25, 2011
- Recorded: March 18, 2011
- Genre: J-Pop, blues, rock
- Length: 2:33
- Label: Warner Music Japan
- Songwriter: Shiho Ochi

"You & Me" is a song by Japanese band Superfly. It was written by Superfly's vocalist and frontwoman Shiho Ochi in response to the 2011 Tōhoku earthquake and tsunami, and initially released to her blog on March 19, 2011, via a YouTube video. On March 25, 2011, Superfly released the song for sale to the iTunes Store, the Recochoku store, and the wamo! store, and revealed that all proceeds from sales of the song will go to the Japanese Red Cross's relief efforts. As of May 11, 2011, sales of the song allowed Superfly to raise ¥7,831,780 (approx. US$96.8k, €68k, or £59.4k) for the Red Cross.

"You & Me" quickly rose to the top of the iTunes Japan singles charts, and on the RIAJ Digital Track Chart, it debuted at number 37, and on the Japan Hot 100, it debuted at number 24, and then reached number 4 on the following week.
