= Ah (song) =

Single by Superfly

from the album Mind Travel
- Released: June 29, 2011
- Recorded: 2011
- Genre: J-pop
- Length: 3:32 (Single version); 3:33 (Album version)
- Label: Warner Music Group
- Songwriters: Shiho Ochi, Kōichi Tabo

Superfly singles chronology
"Rollin' Days" (2011)	"Ah" (2011)	"Ai o Kurae" (2011)

Music video
- "あぁ" at YouTube

Music video
- "Ah" at YouTube

"Ah" is a song by Japanese J-pop and rock band Superfly. "Ah" was initially released as the final track on their third studio album Mind Travel. On June 14, 2011, before the release of the album, Superfly released a statement that "Ah" would be released as the album's 4th single and as the band's 13th single overall. This version, titled in Japanese as "あぁ" (Aa), would feature lyrics, instead of the album version's a cappella chanting, and would be sold as a one-track single. The label wanted to release the version with lyrics as part of Mind Travel, but Shiho Ochi decided that the version without lyrics would be on the album but they would release the lyric version at a later date. Regarding the song, Ochi stated that the album version of the song is meant to show that one does not need words to convey emotions to others. In addition, a short film consisting of a total solar eclipse that uses "Ah" as its soundtrack will be shown at the Short Shorts Film Festival & Asia 2011 on June 16, 2011. The "Aa" version peaked at number 9 on the Oricon Weekly Charts.

== Track listing ==
CD
No.	Title	Lyrics	Music	Arranger(s)	Length
1.	"Ah" (あぁ Aa)	Shiho Ochi	Koichi Tabo	Koichi Tsutaya	3:32

== Personnel ==
Personnel details were sourced from the liner notes booklet of Mind Travel.

- Aico – background vocal
- Mika Arisaka – background vocal
- Can'no – background vocal
- Luz Fonte – background vocal
- Binkoh Izawa – background vocal
- Jon Kasagi – background vocal
- Junear – background vocal
- Frances Maya – background vocal
- Miku Nakamura – background vocal
- Shiho Ochi – lead and background vocal
- Haruko Ōhinata – background vocal
- Rung Hyang – background vocal
- San (Chagra) – background vocal
- Tama (Chagra) – background vocal
- Hiroko Satoh – background vocal
- Masayuki Shioda – background vocal
- Kaori Sawada – background vocal
- Kenichi Takemoto – background vocal
- Maiko Takeshita – background vocal
- Mayuka Tanaka – background vocal
- Yukiko Tanaka – background vocal
- Kōichi Tsutaya – piano, programming
- Yūho Yoshioka – background vocal
