= Ai o Komete Hanataba o =

Single by Superfly

from the album Superfly
- Released: February 27, 2008
- Recorded: 2007
- Genre: Pop-rock
- Length: 4:53
- Label: Warner Music Japan
- Songwriters: Kōichi Tabo, Shiho Ochi, Junji Ishiwatari
- Producer: Kōichi Tsutaya

Superfly singles chronology
"I Spy I Spy" (2008)	"Ai o Komete Hanataba o" (2008)	"Hi-Five" (2008)

Music video
- "Ai o Komete Hanataba o" at YouTube

"Ai o Komete Hanataba o" (愛をこめて花束を; "A Bouquet with Love") is a song by Japanese pop-rock act Superfly. Used as Edison no Haha's theme song, "Ai o Komete Hanataba o" was released as the band's fourth single on February 27, 2008. The song was Superfly's break-through single, breaking into the Oricon physical singles chart's top 20. As of 2011, it is Superfly's most successful single, being certified as a million ringtone download, triple platinum as a cellphone download, and single platinum for digital sales.

== Writing and background ==
The melody of "Ai o Komete Hanataba o" was first written in 1997 by Kōichi Tabo at age 15. The song was re-arranged to be used as a song by the band in 2005, after Superfly had moved to Tokyo to pursue their musical career. The song was performed at many lives performed by Superfly before their debut in 2006. While Tabo had already written basic lyrics for "Ai o Komete Hanataba o", they were replaced with new lyrics in 2006 after "Ai o Komete Hanataba o" had been chosen as the theme for the TV drama. The new lyrics were written by vocalist Shiho Ochi, who was assisted by former Supercar member Junji Ishiwatari. The original version was titled the same and had the same theme of a person putting their feelings of love into a bouquet, however in the new version, Ochi changed the gender of a receiver, so it was a boy who received the bouquet. Ochi based the lyrics around her own experience of giving a boy a bouquet of flowers.

"Ai o Komete Hanataba o" felt like a restart to Superfly for vocalist Shiho Ochi, as it was her first solo release after Kōichi Tabo left the official band line-up, and her collaboration song with Jet, "I Spy I Spy."

== Promotion ==
The song was announced as the theme song for Edison no Haha on December 11, 2007, a month before the drama began airing. This was the first time a song by Superfly was associated with a Japanese drama. The producer of the drama, Shōichi Katō, decided to use Superfly for the theme song after being impressed by Superfly's debut single, "Hello Hello," feeling the "strong vocals" and "uplifting message" were fitting for the work. The song was already written prior to the drama, and was chosen by Katō out of a collection of unreleased Superfly demos.

In addition to its use in the drama, "Ai o Komete Hanataba o" was featured in commercials for paid download providers music.jp and Recochoku.

== Music video ==
Superfly in the music video for "Ai o Komete Hanataba o".

The music video was directed by Shūichi Banba, the first time Banba worked together with Superfly. He would become a regular collaborator, directing videos for songs such as "Hi-Five," "Koisuru Hitomi wa Utsukushii", "Yasashii Kimochi de" and "Wildflower".

The music video begins with a shot of a self-playing piano. Vocalist Shiho Ochi stands in front of a camera in a tented campground and sings "Ai o Komete Hanataba o". The camera is shown taking pictures of various other people at the campground, including two small children who hide behind their mother playfully. During the chorus, Ochi performs with men performing instruments, and her image is overlaid in psychedelic colors on the scene. Ochi picks up flowers from inside a box and throws them, becoming surrounded by flower petals. The final scene shows all of the camp members sitting down for a formal photograph.

== Critical reception ==
HotExpress reviewer Takayuki Saito complimented Ochi's "freeing overwhelming vocalism" and Tabo's "excellent melody sense," as well as the lively arrangement.

== Track listing ==
No.	Title	Writer(s)	Arranger	Length
1.	"Ai o Komete Hanataba o" (愛をこめて花束を, "A Bouquet with Love")	Kōichi Tabo, Shiho Ochi, Junji Ishiwatari	Kōichi Tsutaya	4:53
2.	"Ai to Kansha" (愛と感謝, "Love and Gratitude")	K. Tabo, S. Ochi	Motoki Matsuoka	4:24
3.	"Rhiannon" (Fleetwood Mac cover)	Stevie Nicks		5:00
Total length:				14:17

== Chart rankings ==
"Ai o Komete Hanataba o"
The chorus of "Ai o Komete Hanataba o", plus a section of the instrumental motif.

Chart (2008)	Peak position
Billboard Japan Hot 100	7
Oricon weekly singles	13
RIAJ Reco-kyō ringtones Top 100	7
Chart (2009)	Peak position
RIAJ Reco-kyō ringtones Top 100	63
RIAJ Digital Track Chart Top 100	81
Chart (2010)	Peak position
Billboard Adult Contemporary Airplay	9
RIAJ Digital Track Chart Top 100	40
Chart (2011)	Peak position
RIAJ Digital Track Chart Top 100	91

== Sales and certifications ==
Chart	Amount
Oricon physical sales	47,000
RIAJ ringtone downloads	Million (1,000,000+)
RIAJ full-length cellphone downloads	Triple platinum (750,000+)
RIAJ PC downloads	Platinum (250,000+)
RIAJ streaming	3× Platinum (300,000,000+)

== Release history ==
Region	Date	Format	Distributing Label
Japan	February 27, 2008	CD, digital download	Warner Music Japan
Japan	March 15, 2008	Rental CD	Warner Music Japan
