= Yokohama Red Brick Warehouse =

Building in Naka-ku, Kanagawa Prefecture, Japan

Coordinates: 35°27′08″N 139°38′34″E

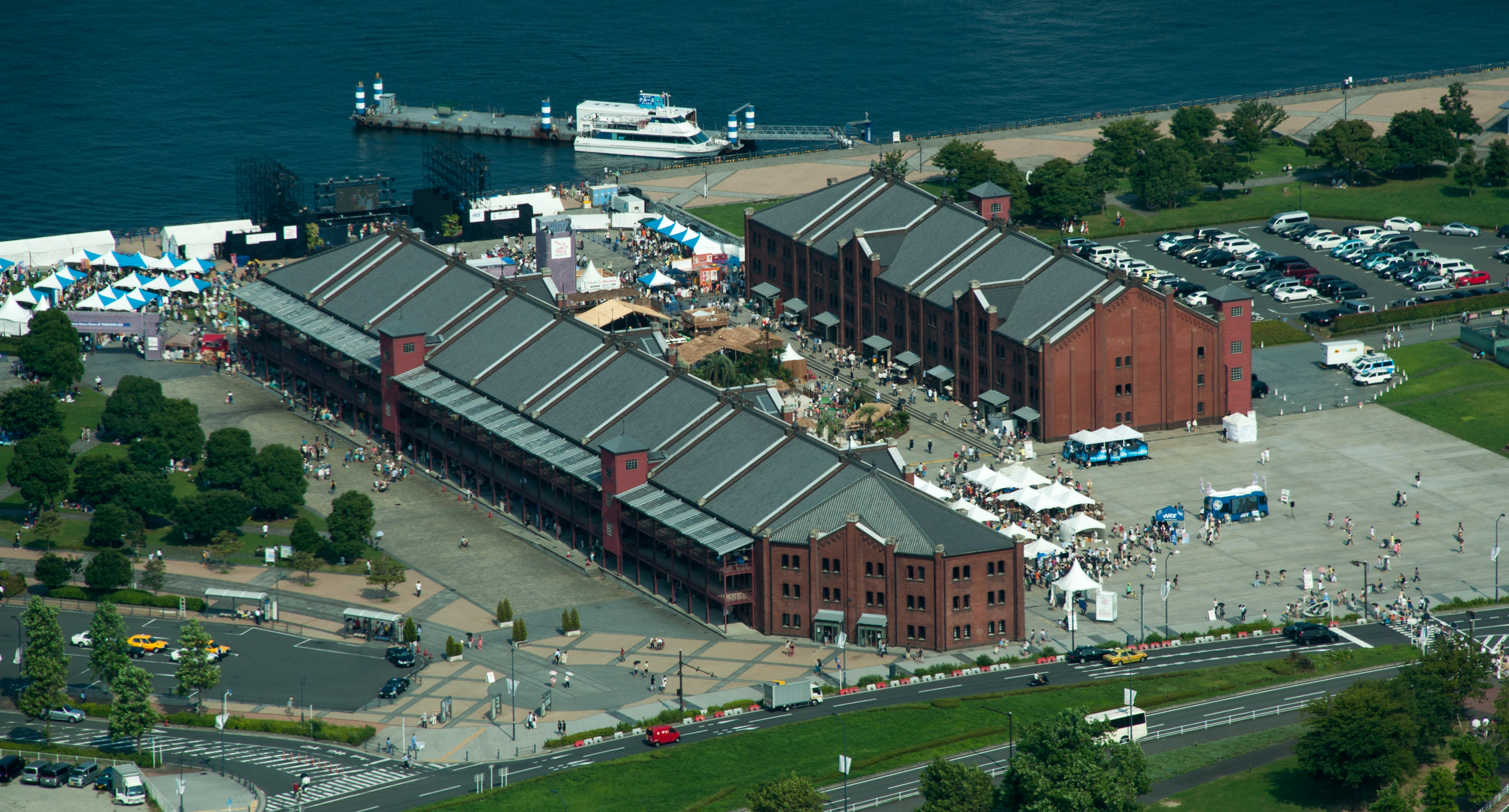
The Yokohama Red Brick Warehouse seen from Landmark Tower

The Yokohama Red Brick Warehouse (横浜赤レンガ倉庫, Yokohama Akarenga Sōko) is a historical building that is used as a complex that includes a shopping mall, banquet hall, and event venues. The complex, officially known as the Newport Pier Bonded Warehouse (新港埠頭保税倉庫, Shinkō Futō Hozei Sōko), was originally used as customs buildings, and has two sections: Warehouse No.1 and No.2. It is operated by Yokohama Akarenga Co. Ltd., and located at the Port of Yokohama in Naka-ku, Yokohama, Kanagawa, Japan.

== History ==
In the late 19th century, the Yokohama city government worked on constructing new harbour facilities, and the first reclamation work was begun in 1899. The work, completed in 1905, was followed by expansion work which ended a year later. Planned by a Japanese architect and a government official, Tsumaki Yorinaka, the current Building No. 2 was constructed in 1911, and the current Building No. 1 was erected in 1913. Both were to be used as customs houses.

When the 1923 Great Kantō earthquake struck Yokohama, the red brick buildings were damaged, but suffered less than other buildings due to their reinforced structure with iron implanted between the bricks. Repair work continued until 1930, and after World War II, the buildings were requisitioned by the American occupation forces between 1945 and 1956. After the buildings were returned to Japan, their use decreased with the advent of containerization, and the buildings ended their role as customs houses in 1989.

The process of renovation of the building was envisioned and pursued by Naoshi Kawabata. In 1992, Yokohama city acquired jurisdiction over the buildings, and restoration work was carried out from 1994 to 1999. This work, in which the roof and structure of the buildings were strengthened, was conducted by Takenaka Corporation, a Japanese architectural company. After the inside of the buildings was renovated, they were opened as the Yokohama Red Brick Warehouse on April 12, 2002.In 2002 (Heisei 14), Building 1 was reborn as the Yokohama Red Brick Warehouse, housing cultural facilities such as exhibition spaces and halls, while Building 2 became a commercial facility. The surrounding area was developed into Red Brick Park, featuring plazas and parks. Since then, it has become a representative tourist attraction in the Minato Mirai district (located in Block 2 of the district).

== Overview ==
The complex is divided into buildings No. 1 and No. 2. Both buildings are three stories high, and are 22.6 metres wide and 17.8 metres tall. The area of Building No. 1 is 5,575 m^{2}, with a length of 76 metres, while Building No. 2 has a total area of 10,755 m^{2}, and a length of 149 metres.

Building No. 1 is regarded as a cultural facility, and is utilized as an event venue for art exhibitions, film festivals, musical competitions and plays. Building No. 2 houses a shopping mall and restaurant arcade, and a balcony from which visitors can view the harbour opened on the 3rd floor in 2007. Other sightseeing spots including Yokohama Chinatown, Minato Mirai 21, and Yamashita Park are located nearby.

== Seasonal events ==
The area around Yokohama Red Brick Warehouse is home to a popular annual ticketed German-style Christmas market from November 25 to December 25 (Christmas Day). Part of the appeal is the warehouse's strong German architectural inspiration. From December to February, Yokohama Red Brick is home to Yokohama Art Rink, an outdoor ice skating rink that doubles as an art exhibition showcasing local artists. The Art Rink has been in operation since 2005.

Likewise, an Oktoberfest is held from late September to mid-October.Originally, Oktoberfest is the world's largest beer festival, held annually in Munich, Germany since 1810. It gathers beers you rarely get to drink in Japan, including those brewed by long-established breweries and award-winning beers. It also offers authentic sausages and meat dishes, perfect as snacks to pair with beer.

The Yokohama Strawberry Festival is held in early spring, when strawberries are in season. Large strawberry sculptures are displayed in the plaza. In 2023, its 10th anniversary, the festival featured direct sales of locally grown, morning-picked Yokohama strawberries and tasting events for brand strawberries from Fukushima, Nara, and Ibaraki prefectures. A wide array of strawberry-themed gourmet treats gathered together, from traditional Japanese sweets like dorayaki and daifuku to parfaits, cakes, and strawberry candy.

== Sports ==
On December 10, 2018, it was announced that the Final Stage of SASUKE 36's special would be broadcast live from the Yokohama Red Brick Warehouse on TBS on New Year's Eve. The 2019 edition of SASUKE's Final Stage was once again be broadcast live from the warehouse on December 31, 2019. It was the 2nd consecutive SASUKE tournament to have a live Final Stage.

== In popular culture ==
- Komi Can't Communicate features a scene at Yokohama Art Rink.
- The building serves as the setting of a secondhand book fair in the 10th TV episode of After the Rain.
- Gundam Build Divers Re:Rise includes a shot of the Aile Strike Gundam in front of the warehouse. The warehouse was also featured as a stop along a Re:Rise-themed stamp rally.
- Harbor Tale, a 2011 stop motion mixed-media short, anthropomorphizes a red brick situated in a corner of the warehouse.
- Yokohama Red Brick serves as the site of Atsushi and Kyōka’s date in Bungo Stray Dogs.

== Gallery ==
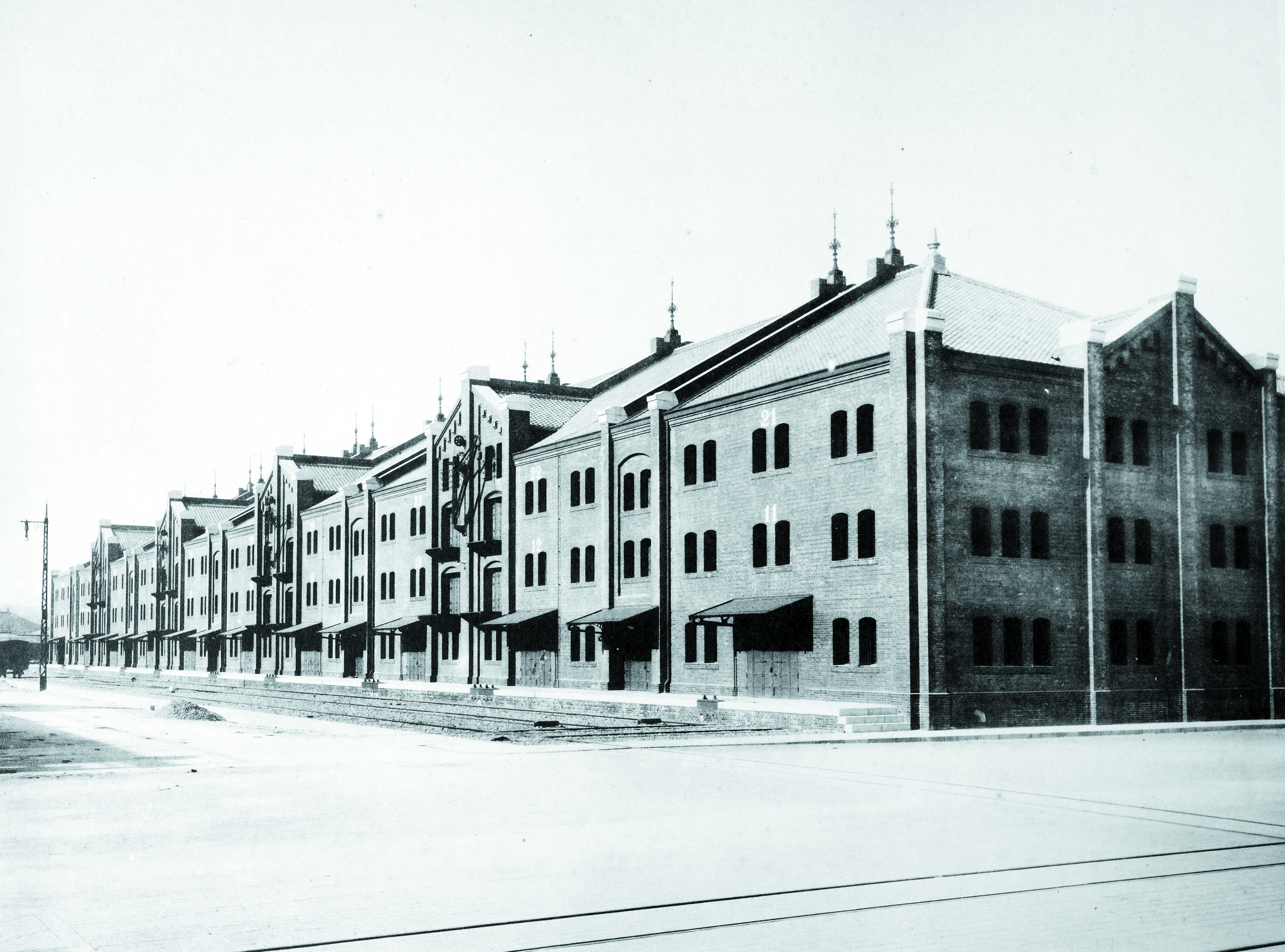
The warehouse in 1917

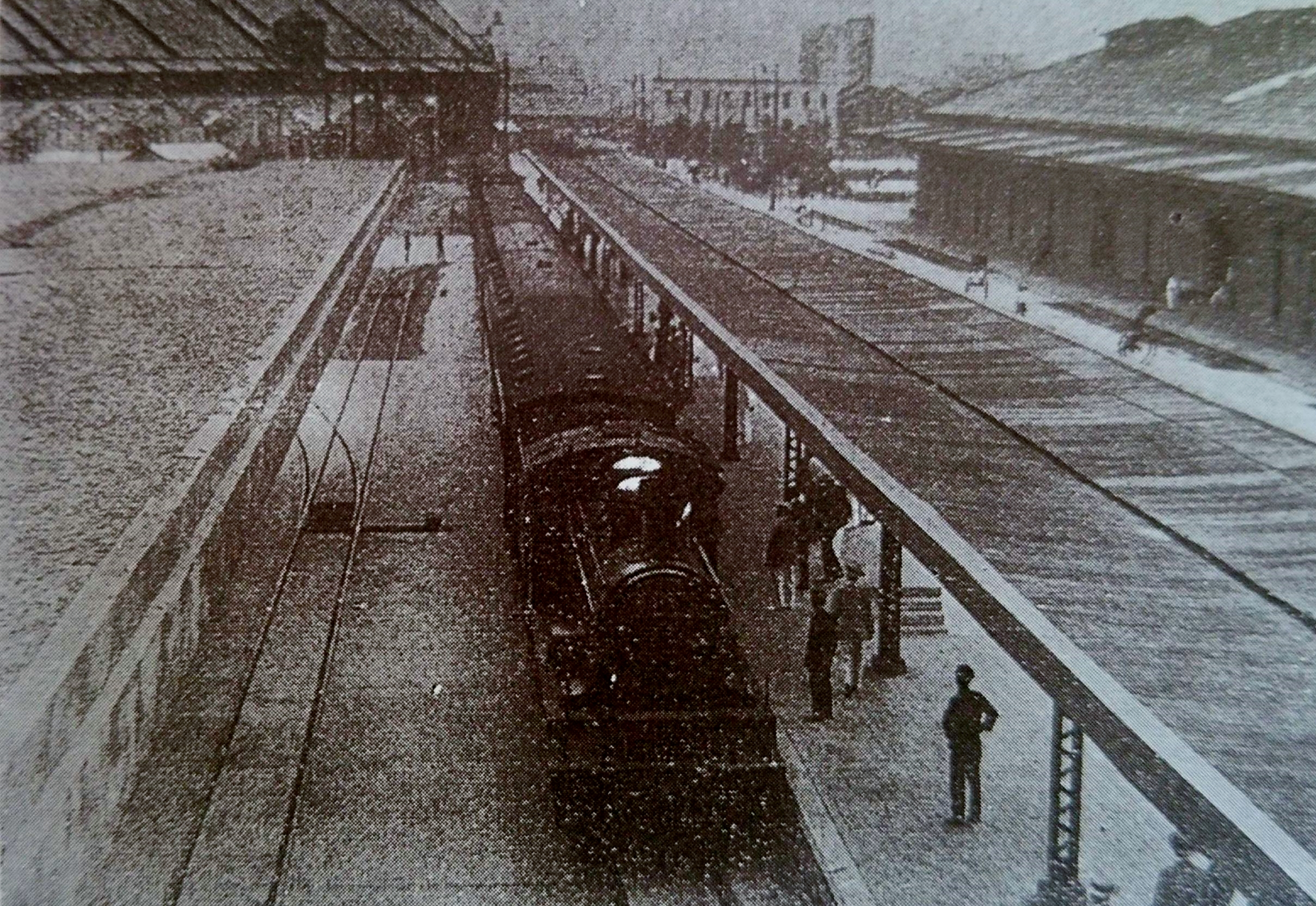
Yokohama Port Station in 1929, with the warehouse visible behind

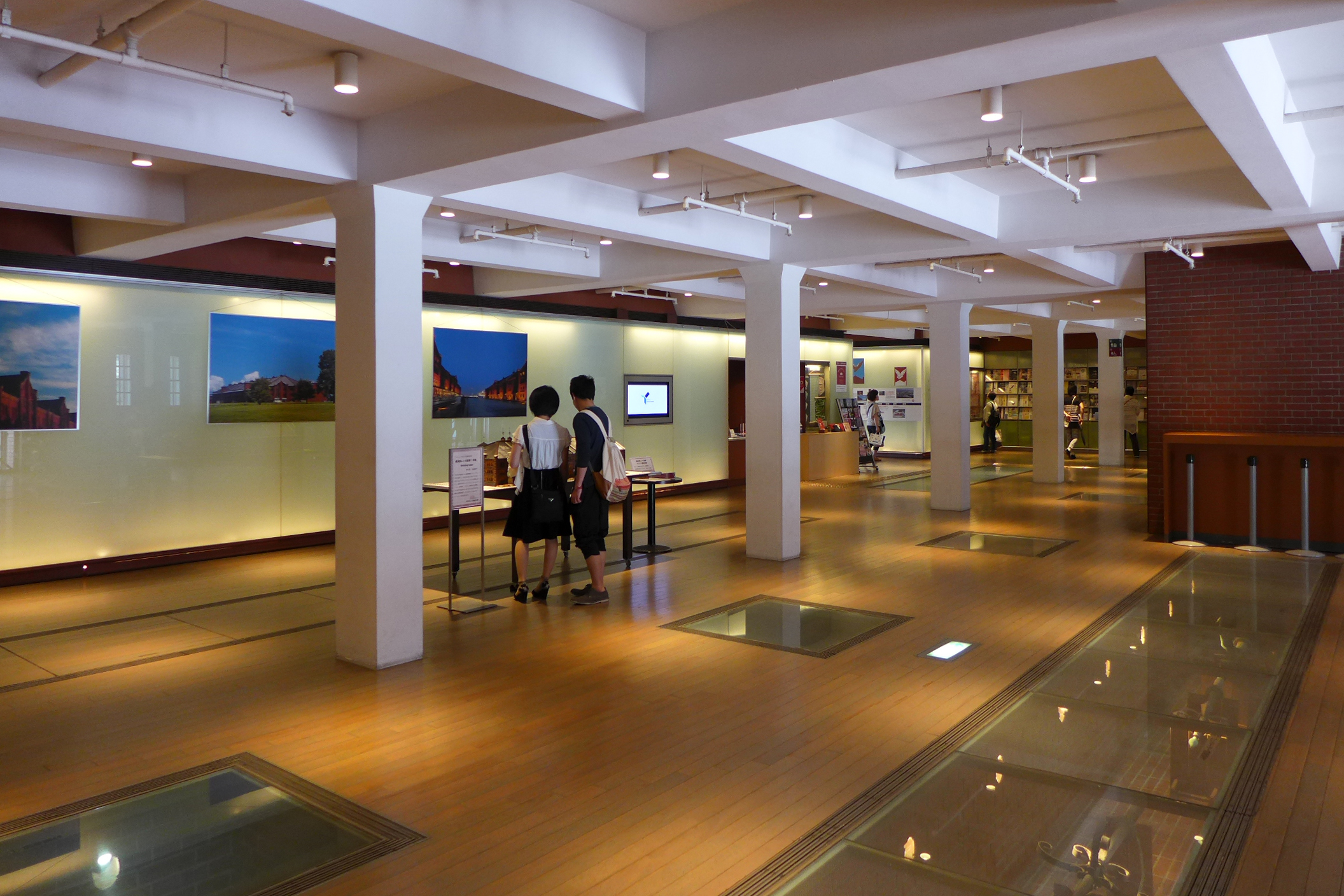
Historical gallery

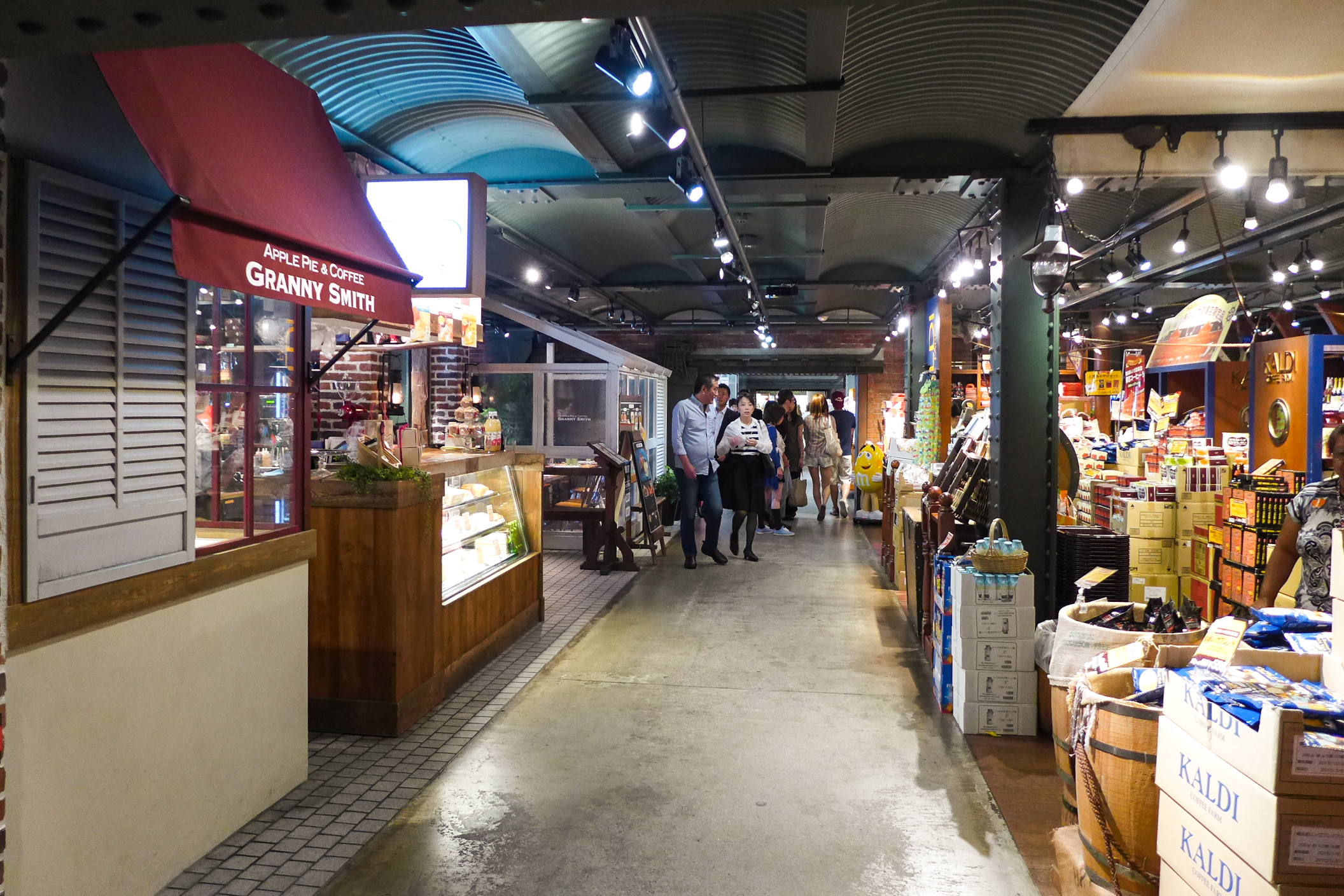
Shops inside warehouse

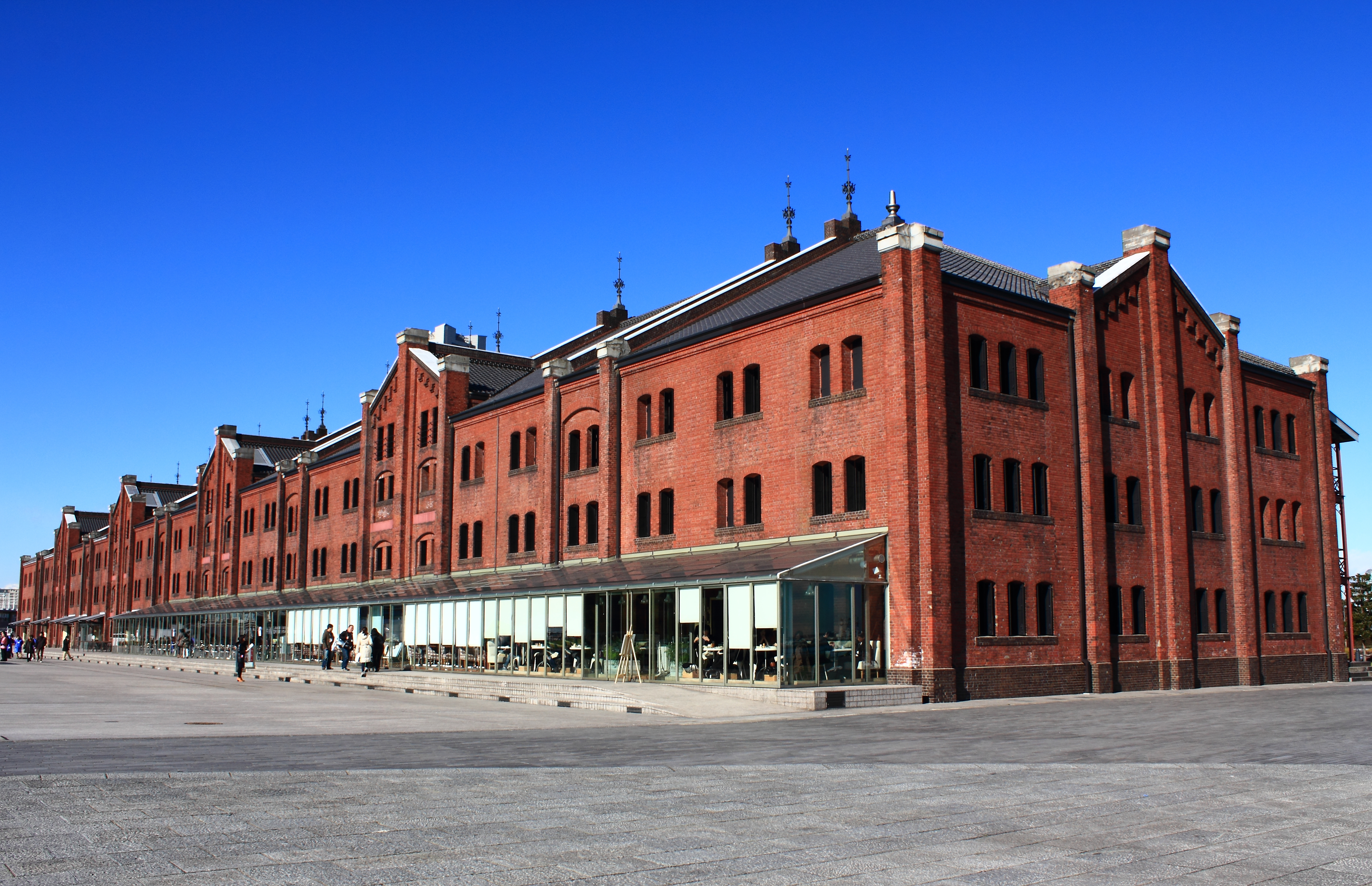
The Warehouse building (2012)

Several scenes from Yokohama Red Brick Warehouse, 2023

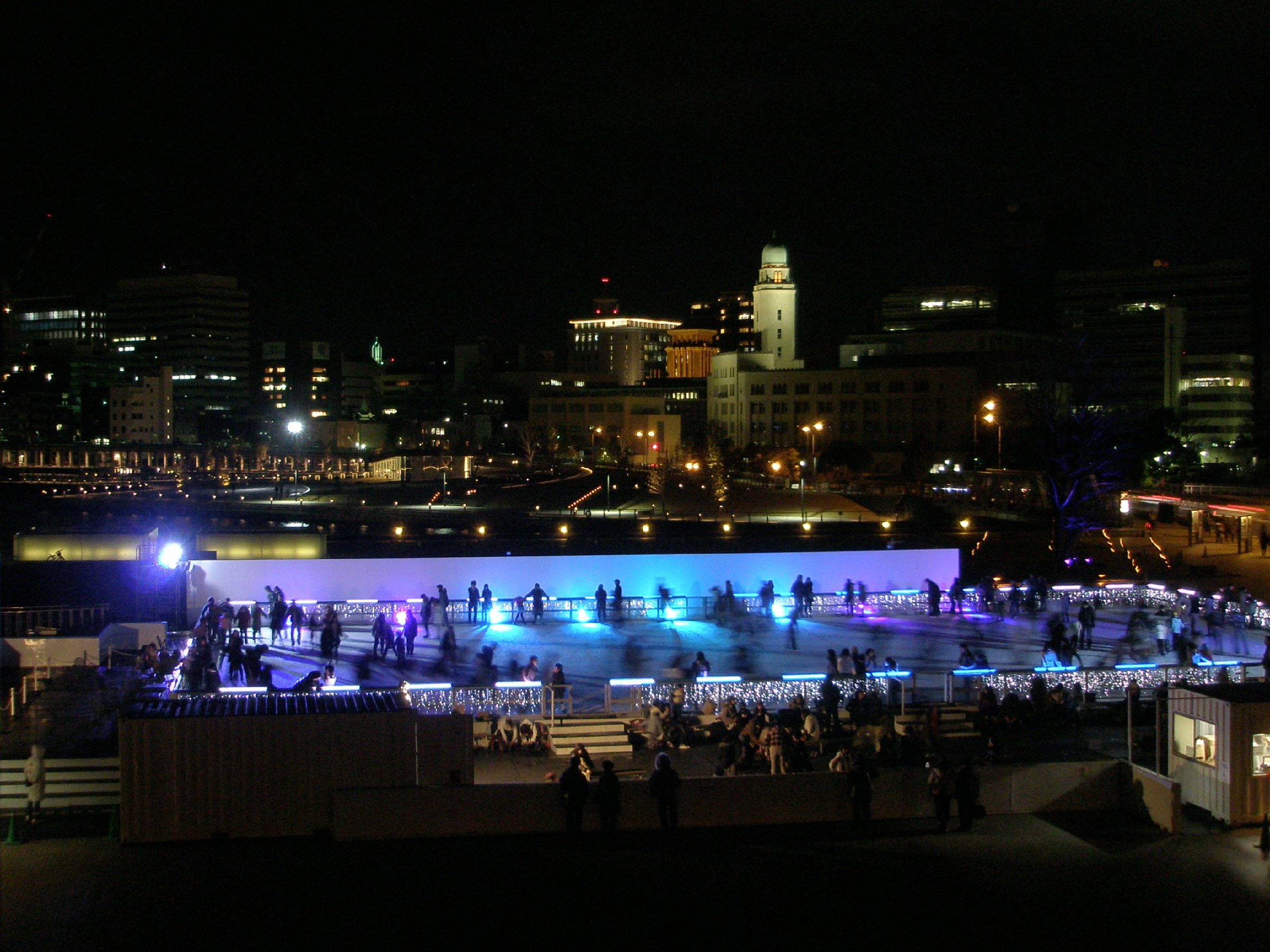
Ice skaters enjoying Yokohama Art Rink in 2010
