= Hi-Five (song) =

Single by Superfly

from the album Superfly
- Released: April 23, 2008
- Genre: J-Pop, blues rock
- Length: 4:01
- Label: Warner Music Japan
- Songwriters: Shiho Ochi, jam, Kōichi Tabo

Superfly singles chronology
"Ai o Komete Hanataba o" (2008)	"Hi-Five" (2008)	"How Do I Survive?" (2008)

Music video
- "Hi-Five" at YouTube

"Hi-Five" is the fifth single by Japanese rock act Superfly, and was the last single released prior to the band's debut self-titled album. The main track was used in promotions for au's "LISMO" service in April 2008. The B-sides for the physical release of the album were three of the four tracks from their 2007 iTunes Store set released as Live from Tokyo. "Hi-Five" ultimately reached the number 30 spot on the Oricon charts, while it went to number 7 on the Japan Hot 100.

== Track listing ==
No.	Title	Writer(s)	Arranger	Length
1.	"Hi-Five"	Shiho Ochi, jam, Kōichi Tabo	Koichi Tsutaya, Tabo	4:01
2.	"Honky Tonk Women" (Performed Live for iTunes on 06/08/2007)	Keith Richards, Mick Jagger		3:17
3.	"Bad, Bad Leroy Brown" (Performed Live for iTunes on 06/08/2007)	Jim Croce		3:10
4.	"Desperado" (Performed Live for iTunes on 06/08/2007)	Glenn Frey, Don Henley		3:33
Total length:				13:59
