= Rollin' Days =

Single by Superfly

from the album Mind Travel
- Released: May 18, 2011
- Genre: Pop-rock
- Length: 4:01
- Label: Warner Music Japan
- Songwriters: Shiho Ochi, Kōichi Tabo
- Producer: Koichi Tsutaya

Superfly singles chronology
"Beep!!" (2011)	"Rollin' Days" (2011)	"Ah" (2011)

Music video
- "Rollin' Days" at YouTube

"Rollin' Days" is a song by Japanese rock act Superfly. It is a digital single from the band's third studio album Mind Travel. The song itself is featured as the theme song for the Japanese drama BOSS. "Rollin' Days" reached the top of the iTunes Store charts, peaked at 11 on the Japan Hot 100, and at 7 on the RIAJ Digital Track Chart. Superfly's vocalist Shiho Ochi wrote the lyrics while former guitarist Kōichi Tabo composed the track with Koichi Tsutaya arranging the song.

The "Rollin' Days" music video is one of the 50 nominees for the various categories in the 2012 SPACE SHOWER Music Video Awards. In 2015, the song was certified gold by the RIAJ.

== Personnel ==
Personnel details were sourced from the liner notes booklet of Mind Travel.

- Noriyasu "Kaasuke" Kawamura – drums
- Shiho Ochi – lead and background vocals, tambourine, cowbell
- Kōichi Tabo – electric guitar (Open-G turning)
- Kiyoshi Takakuwa – bass
- Kōichi Tsutaya – hammond B-3, background vocals
- Yoshiyuki Yatsuhashi – electric guitar
