= Hello Hello (song) =

Single by Superfly

from the album Superfly
- Released: April 4, 2007
- Recorded: 2007
- Genre: Pop, rock
- Label: Warner Music Japan (WPCL-10400)
- Songwriters: Shiho Ochi, Kōichi Tabo

Superfly singles chronology
"Hello Hello" (2007)	"Manifesto" (2007)

Music video
- "Hello Hello" at YouTube

"'Hello Hello" (ハロー・ハロー, Harō Harō) is the debut single by Japanese rock act Superfly, released on April 4, 2007. The song was composed by guitarist Koichi Tabo with lyrics co-written by vocalist Shiho Ochi. It reached No. 31 on the Oricon weekly singles chart and charted for seven weeks. A special "bonus version" of the song was released on iTunes featuring a live version of "Hello Hello" with the title "13,000 Person Live @ Osaka-jō Hall FM802 Requestage".

== Track listing ==
CD
No.	Title	Lyrics	Music	Arranger(s)	Length
1.	"Hello Hello" (ハロー・ハロー Harō Harō)	Shiho Ochi, Kōichi Tabo	Kōichi Tabo	Kōichi Tabo
2.	"Kodoku no Hyena" (孤独のハイエナ Kodoku no Haiena; "Lonely Hyena")	Shiho Ochi, Kōichi Tabo	Kōichi Tabo	Kōichi Tabo, Kazuyoshi Aoki
3.	"Hot'N'Nasty" (originally by Humble Pie)	Steve Marriott	Humble Pie

Digital single
No.	Title	Lyrics	Music	Arranger(s)	Length
1.	"Hello Hello (13,000 person Live @ Osaka-jō Hall FM802 Requestage)" (bonus version)	Shiho Ochi, Kōichi Tabo	Kōichi Tabo	Kōichi Tabo
