= Tamashii Revolution =

- Artwork for the digital release of "Tamashii Revolution"

Song by Superfly

from the album Mind Travel
- Released: June 18, 2010
- Genre: J-pop, rock
- Length: 3:45
- Label: Warner Music Japan
- Songwriter: Shiho Ochi
- Producer: Kōichi Tsutaya

Music video
- "Tamashii Revolution" at YouTube

"Tamashii Revolution" (タマシイレボリューション, Tamashii Reboryūshon; "Soul Revolution") is a song by Japanese band Superfly. It was used as the theme song of the NHK broadcast of the 2010 FIFA World Cup, played during relay clips and highlight shows. It was released as a digital download in Japan on June 18, 2010, and was later included on Superfly's single and cover album release "Wildflower" & Cover Songs: Complete Best 'Track 3' in September 2010. An extended version of the song appears on Superfly's third studio album Mind Travel.

== Writing and inspiration ==
The song is an upbeat pop-rock song, arranged with a mix of a 1960s-inspired band arrangement and a brass band backing. The lyrics are written in second person, addressing somebody and trying to encourage them. Metaphors, such as facing monsters or "going to an unknown world" are used. The song also mentions that "(the songwriter does not) care about adversity, I'm the strongest when changing."

"Tamashii Revolution" was created right before the cut-off date for the soccer theme song's submission, after Superfly vocalist Shiho Ochi and her recording members were not satisfied with any of the other songs they had tried. It was built around a pre-existing chorus lyrical phrase that Ochi had. Originally the songs Superfly were creating had a sparse guitar arrangement, but when they were told that the world cup was taking place in South Africa, the songs had added percussion and a fuller arrangement.

The song was written by Ochi, who wanted to create a "reassuring song able to cheer on all the players". This is the second song solely composed by Ochi in Superfly's discography, after "Last Love Song" from Superfly's self-titled debut album in 2008. She described the writing process as being very difficult. Ochi wanted to "lift (the soccer fans') good feelings and tension" when they watched the soccer matches, however found it hard to write a song that the soccer players themselves would not hear. Furthermore, the song had to be much more upbeat than songs Superfly was used to writing. Ochi reasoned that a soccer player's pitch was much like a band's stage, so used her feelings about the stage as inspiration for the song.

== Promotion ==
The bulk of promotion for the song was its use during NHK's broadcast of the 2010 FIFA World Cup. The song was widely used in relays during soccer matches, especially matches featuring Japan and the final trophy matches. It was also used widely throughout NHK shows that discussed the World Cup, such as highlight shows.

The song was performed on television at Music Station on June 17, Music Japan, on June 27, 2010, and at Bokura no Ongaku in collaboration with Saki Aibu, on August 3, 2010. Superfly also performed the song at summer festivals, such as at the Fuji Rock Festival on July 30, J-Wave Live 2000+10 on August 14 and Super Dry the Live, on August 28. The song was also performed at Odaiba Gasshūkoku, a Fuji Television event performed to 7,000 people and streamed live on August 31.

== Music videos ==
Superfly in the Tōru Nomura-directed short music video.

Superfly in the Saitō Wataru-directed music video.

Two music videos were produced for the song, one directed by Tōru Nomura (dubbed the "Short Version") used in promotions for the song's release as a digital single in June 2010, and another directed by Saitō Wataru, used in promotions due to its appearances in "Wildflower" & Cover Songs: Complete Best 'Track 3' in September 2010.

The short version, as its name suggests, is only accompanied by a two-minute edit of the song. It features Superfly and several bands in a recording studio, as they perform a recording of the song together. Much of the video features close-ups, and non-steady camera work. The close-ups feature such things as the band members' instruments, and recording materials such as the sheet music or the recording machinery. The bulk of shots centre around vocalist Shiho Ochi as she performs the song in front of a music stand, with headphones. In some scenes of the video, individual shots are frozen and replaced with versions featuring washed out colours, and occasionally writing (such as the word passion (パッション, passhon)) while Ochi sings the words in the lyrics. The performance is interspersed with shots of Ochi working on the post-production of the recording in the booth, or on a laptop.

The regular-length version features Superfly performing the song with a band in an old Western-style stone building, overgrown with creeping vines. This version features a lot of added animation and distorted images, featuring black-and-white flames and bubbles. The art style features many grainy distortions in the style of a printed comic, and many patterns based on newsprint. Much of the animation focuses of images of soccer balls, which fly out of the television set in the room where the band plays, and out of the building's windows. Occasionally, the animations are only additions to the scenes, while other times the entire shots have been animated. At certain points, Ochi and her back-up band are represented as cartoons, and in others, Ochi performs the song with people in gorilla suits.

== Critical reception ==
CDJournal reviewers called the song a "funky" and "up tempo pop song", and noted how exhilarating and exciting the song was. They praised the song's bold chorus, as well as its samba-flavoured sensual beats and bold horn arrangement. The reviewers called it the "ultimate positive song", that naturally makes you want to dance.

== Track listings ==
"Tamashii Revolution" digital download
No.	Title	Lyrics	Music	Arranger(s)	Length
1.	"Tamashii Revolution"	Shiho Ochi	Shiho Ochi	Kōichi Tsutaya	3:46
Total length:					3:46

"Wildflower" single
No.	Title	Lyrics	Music	Arranger(s)	Length
1.	"Wildflower"	S. Ochi	Kōichi Tabo	K. Tsutaya, K. Tabo	4:26
2.	"Tamashii Revolution"	S. Ochi	S. Ochi	K. Tsutaya	3:46
3.	"Free Planet"	S. Ochi	K. Tabo	K. Tsutaya, K. Tabo	3:23
4.	"Roll Over the Rainbow"	S. Ochi, Jam	K. Tabo	K. Tsutaya, K. Tabo	4:53
Total length:					16:26

== Personnel ==
Personnel details were sourced from the liner notes booklet of Mind Travel.

- Mikio Hirama – electric guitar
- Hiroshi "Matsukichi" Matsubara – drums, percussion
- Yōichi Murata – trombone
- Shiho Ochi – lead and background vocals, cowbell
- Masahiko Sugasaka – trumpet
- Masakuni Takeno – alto sax
- Takeshi Taneda – bass
- Kōichi Tsutaya – piano, programming
- Takuo Yamamoto – tenor sax
- Yoshiyuki Yatsuhashi – electric guitar
- Hitoshi Yokoyama – trumpet

== Chart rankings ==
"Tamashii Revolution"
The song's boldness and positivity were praised by reviewers.

Weekly chart performance for "Tamashii Revolution"
Chart	Peak position
Billboard Japan Hot 100	5
Billboard Adult Contemporary Airplay	2
RIAJ Digital Track Chart Top 100	4
RIAJ Digital Track Chart yearly top 100	64

Annual chart rankings for "Tamashii Revolution"
Chart (2010)	Rank
Japan Adult Contemporary (Billboard)	59

=== Certifications ===
Chart	Amount
RIAJ digital downloads	2× Platinum (500,000+)

== Release history ==
Region	Date	Format
Japan	June 16, 2010	Ringtone
Japan	June 18, 2010	PC digital download, Cellphone full-length download
