= Manifesto (Superfly song) =

Single by Superfly

from the album Superfly
- Released: August 1, 2007
- Recorded: 2007
- Genre: Pop, rock
- Label: Warner Music Japan (WPCL-10417)
- Songwriters: Shiho Ochi, Kōichi Tabo

Superfly singles chronology
"Hello Hello" (2007)	"Manifesto" (2007)	"I Spy I Spy" (2007)

Music video
- "Manifesto" at YouTube

"Manifesto" (マニフェスト, Manifesuto) is the second single by Japanese act Superfly, released on August 1, 2007. It is the last single to include Koichi Tabo as a member of Superfly. It reached 51st place on the Oricon weekly singles chart and charted for four weeks. A special live version of "Manifesto" from the "13,000 Person Live @ Osaka-jō Hall FM802 Requestage" is an iTunes Store exclusive.

== Track listing ==
CD
No.	Title	Lyrics	Music	Arranger(s)	Length
1.	"Manifesto" (マニフェスト Manifesuto)	Shiho Ochi, Kōichi Tabo	Kōichi Tabo	Kōichi Tabo
2.	"Rin" (凛, "Cold")	Shiho Ochi	Kōichi Tabo	Kōichi Tabo, Motoki Matsuoka, Yoshinoli Abe
3.	"(Please Not) One More Time" (Originally by Roger McGuinn)	Al Kooper	Al Kooper
