= Wildflower (Superfly song) =

Single by Superfly

from the album Mind Travel
- Released: September 1, 2010
- Recorded: 2010
- Genre: Pop, rock
- Length: 4:26
- Label: Warner Music Japan
- Songwriters: Shiho Ochi, Kōichi Tabo
- Producers: Kōichi Tsutaya, Kōichi Tabo

Superfly singles chronology
"Dancing on the Fire" (2009)	"Wildflower" (2010)	"Eyes on Me" (2010)

"Wildflower" is a song by Japanese musical act Superfly. Used as the theme song for the drama Gold, it was released as a single on September 1, 2010. The single release was packaged as "Wildflower" & Cover Songs: Complete Best 'Track 3', a four-song extended play featuring a cover album as a bonus disc.

== Background and development ==
In September 2009, Superfly released the act's second studio album Box Emotions, their second release in a row to reach number one on Oricon's album chart. This was followed by a single, "Dancing on the Fire", Superfly's second upbeat dance song to be used in commercials for Canon's Digital IXUS range of cameras.

On June 18, Superfly released the song "Tamashii Revolution", a song used as the theme song of the NHK broadcast of the 2010 FIFA World Cup, played during relay clips and highlight shows. It became one of Superfly's biggest commercial successes, eventually becoming certified platinum twice by the RIAJ.

"Wildflower" was first announced as being the theme song for the drama Gold on June 15. It was the second drama starring Yūki Amami, after "My Best of My Life" was used for Boss in 2009. Ochi wrote the lyrics for the song after reading the script for the drama, and was inspired by the stoic story-line and language. Ochi wrote the song about wildflowers, wanting to create a song that reflected the feeling of wanting to live earnestly and strongly.

The single's jacket features vocalist Shiho Ochi holding a different object representing each song on the single: a dahlia flower for "Wildflower", a djembe drum for "Tamashii Revolution", a globe for "Free Planet" and on the back cover a rainbow for "Roll Over the Rainbow".

== Promotion and release ==
"Wildflower" was the leading track of a four song single, commemorating Superfly's 10th single since their debut in 2007. Each song featured a different style of rock, and a different commercial tie-up. The single came packaged with Cover Songs: Best 'Track 3', a compilation album compiling Superfly's English language cover songs that were featured on the B-sides of her singles, as well as three new recordings. One of the new recordings was a cover of Elvin Bishop's 1976 song "Fooled Around and Fell in Love", which was used in the drama Gold as an incidental song, alongside "Wildflower". A limited edition version of the set featured a bonus 8cm single, featuring an acoustic version of "Fooled Around and Fell in Love".

On September 15, Wildflower & Cover Songs: Complete Best 'Track 3' was released as an iTunes LP, the first such download released by a Japanese artist.

Superfly performed "Wildflower" at Music Japan on July 18, followed by performances at Bokura no Ongaku on August 27 and Music Station on September 3.

== Music video ==
A music video was released for the song, directed by Shuichi Banba. It features scenes of Ochi in a Western-style prairie, standing in wooden farming structures and next to a windpump. The music video also features an old man dressed in Western clothing, and a little girl who resembles Ochi. Many scenes depict the old man next to the little girl, who is replaced by the fully-grown Ochi. The man gives some seeds to the little girl, who plants them. In the final scenes of the video, one of the seeds sprout into a red wildflower.

== Critical reception ==
Hirokazu Koike of Rockin' On Japan praised the song developing from its minor chord progression into a bold chorus. He was deeply impressed by the song's ability to make you feel a sense of a tough life force. CDJournal reviewers described "Wildflower" as a "medium" rock song, that was simple and driven with strong vocals. They praised the song's subtle guitar riff introduction which lead into a firmly charming song, as well as the "international atmosphere" caused by the mandolin accents. They felt that the song had strong imagery of a flower rooted firmly in desolate earth, caused by the song's strong sound and heart-resonating vocals.

== Track listing ==
"Wildflower" single
No.	Title	Lyrics	Music	Arranger(s)	Length
1.	"Wildflower"	Shiho Ochi	Kōichi Tabo	Kōichi Tsutaya, K. Tabo	4:26
2.	"Tamashii Revolution" (タマシイレボリューション Tamashii Reboryūshon)	S. Ochi	S. Ochi	K. Tsutaya	3:46
3.	"Free Planet"	S. Ochi	K. Tabo	K. Tsutaya, K. Tabo	3:23
4.	"Roll Over the Rainbow"	S. Ochi, Jam	K. Tabo	K. Tsutaya, K. Tabo	4:53
Total length:					16:26

== Personnel ==
Personnel details were sourced from the liner notes booklet of Mind Travel.

- Ittetsu Gen Strings – strings
- Hideki Matsubara – bass
- Yukio Nagoshi – electric guitar
- Shiho Ochi – lead and background vocals, tambourine
- Yutaka Odawara – drums
- Yoshiyuki Yatsuhashi – electric guitar, mandolin

== Chart rankings ==
Weekly chart performance for "Wildflower"
Chart (2010)	Peak position
Japan Billboard Adult Contemporary Airplay	1
Japan Billboard Japan Hot 100	1
Japan Oricon weekly albums: Wildflower & Cover Songs: Complete Best 'Track 3'	1
Japan RIAJ Digital Track Chart	3

Annual chart rankings for "Wildflower"
Chart (2010)	Rank
Japan Adult Contemporary (Billboard Japan)	21

=== Sales and certifications ===
Chart	Amount
Oricon physical sales: Wildflower & Cover Songs: Complete Best 'Track 3'	369,000
RIAJ digital certification	Platinum (250,000+)
RIAJ physical certification: Wildflower & Cover Songs: Complete Best 'Track 3'	Platinum (250,000+)

== Release history ==
Region	Date	Format	Distributing Label	Catalog codes
Japan	September 1, 2010	digital download, 2CD, 3CD	Warner Music Japan	WPCL-10855, WPCL-10858
Japan	September 15, 2010	digital download (EP)	Warner Music Japan	
Japan	September 18, 2010	Rental CD	Warner Music Japan	WPCL-10858
