= Superfly (band) =

Japanese rock act

- Origin: Japan
- Genres: Pop rock; hard rock; blues rock; funk rock; soul
- Years active: 2003–present
- Labels: Warner Music Japan; Universal Sigma
- Members: Shiho Ochi (vocals) (2003–present)
- Past members: Kōichi Tabo (guitar) (2004–2007)
- Website: superfly-web.com

Shiho Ochi 越智 志帆
- Born: February 25, 1984 (age 42)
- Origin: Matsuyama, Ehime, Japan
- Occupations: Singer, songwriter
- Years active: 2004–present

Kōichi Tabo 多保 孝一
- Born: February 11, 1982 (age 44)
- Origin: Imabari, Ehime, Japan
- Occupations: Guitarist, songwriter
- Years active: 2003–2007

Superfly is a Japanese rock act that debuted on April 4, 2007. Formerly a duo, the act now consists solely of lyricist and vocalist Shiho Ochi with former guitarist Kōichi Tabo still credited as the group's composer and part-time lyricist. Superfly's first two studio albums were certified double platinum by the Recording Industry Association of Japan, and their first four consecutive albums (the third being classified as a "single" by the group) all debuted at the top of the Oricon Weekly Album Charts, a first for a female recording artist in Japan in over seven years.

== History ==
=== 2003–2006: Formation ===
Shiho Ochi (越智 志帆, Ochi Shiho) met Kōichi Tabo (多保 孝一, Tabo Kōichi) in 2003 while they were students at Matsuyama University. They were both members of a music circle that covered songs by Finger 5 and the Rolling Stones. In 2004, the group formed the blues band "Superfly", naming themselves after Curtis Mayfield's song "Superfly". The group split up in 2005, with only Ochi and Tabo remaining when they went to Tokyo to seek out a label.

=== 2007–2008: Superfly ===
After a battle between recording labels, the duo debuted on Warner Music Group with their 2007 single "Hello Hello". This was followed by their Shibuya, Tokyo, Apple Store performance and the subsequent EP Live from Tokyo. On November 8, 2007, a few months after their second single "Manifesto" was released, Kōichi Tabo announced on their website that he stopped appearing on the stage to concentrate on composing the songs. Besides being active behind the scenes as Superfly's composer & arranger, Tabo has also written music for artists such as Charice Pempengco, Mai Fukui, Yuna Ito, Maaya Sakamoto, BECCA, Saki Fukuda, and Asia Engineer. Later that month on November 28, 2007, Superfly released a single in collaboration with the Australian band Jet, titled "I Spy I Spy".

Superfly's debut album Superfly was released on May 14, 2008, topping the Japanese Oricon weekly album charts for two weeks. The release of the album was also celebrated with a free concert at Yoyogi Park in Tokyo. Following its release, Ochi, who has a great admiration for Janis Joplin, was given the chance to travel to San Francisco in 2008 where she travelled through Haight-Ashbury and met up with Sam Andrew of Big Brother and the Holding Company as part of a documentary titled Following the Steps of Janis on Music On! TV. Ochi also counts Carole King, Maria Muldaur, and the Rolling Stones as some of her other favorite artists. In June and July, Superfly did a national tour titled the Rock'N'Roll Show 2008 Tour

=== 2008–2009: Woodstock and Box Emotions ===
In 2009, the asteroid 91907 Shiho was named after Ochi since it was discovered at the Kuma Kogen Astronomical Observatory in Ehime Prefecture, her home prefecture. April also saw the release of the Rock'N'Roll Show 2008 DVD set from the band's 2008 tour stop at the NHK Hall.

During the 2009 Heroes of Woodstock Tour for the tour's stop in Bethel, New York, the site of the original Woodstock Festival, Ochi joined Big Brother and the Holding Company on stage and performed "Down on Me" and "Piece of My Heart" as a follow-up to the previous documentary. The third single from Box Emotions, "Alright!!", was used as the opening theme to the Japanese television drama, Boss, starring Yuki Amami, which began airing on April 16, 2009, as well as its second season which aired in 2011.

Superfly's second studio album, Box Emotions, was released on September 2, 2009, which she celebrated by holding a free live show at the Roppongi Hills arena, which hosted 4000 people. Box Emotions debuted at No. 1 on the Oricon weekly charts, with the first week sales of around 214,000 copies. For the Japanese iTunes Store Rewind of 2009, Box Emotions was the album of the year. Superfly went on tour from October through December to support the album in the "Superfly Box Emotions 2009 Tour".

Ochi has also teamed up with fashion designer Manami Kobayashi for the A.I.C (Another Important Culture) brand to create a line of Woodstock and hippie subculture themed clothing called "Cosmic Market".

=== 2010: "Wildflower and Cover Songs: Complete Best" ===
Superfly's first single since Box Emotions, titled "Dancing on the Fire", won Best Rock Video at the 2010 MTV Video Music Awards Japan. April saw the release of Dancing at Budokan!!, Superfly's second video album featuring the band's performance at the Nippon Budokan in 2009.

Her first release of 2010, "Tamashii Revolution", was used as NHK's 2010 FIFA World Cup theme song, and was released digitally on June 18, 2010. "Tamashii Revolution" was later included as a B-side on the single and cover album compilation "Wildflower" & Cover Songs: Complete Best 'Track 3', which became Superfly's third album to debut at number 1 on the Oricon.

On November 30, 2010, Superfly performed at the Zepp Tokyo arena alongside a session band called "The Lemon Bats" (consisting of Mo'Some Tonebender's Kazuhiro Momo and Superfly's touring & recording guitarist Yoshiyuki Yatsuhashi on guitar, record producer Koichi Tsutaya on keyboard, Straightener's Hidekazu Hinata on bass, and Tatsuya Nakamura on drums) in a show called the Switch 25th Anniversary presents Superfly & The Lemon Bats Special Live "Rock'N' Roll Muncher". Performing as "Superfly & The Lemon Bats", Ochi performed covers of "Dr. Feelgood", "Beat It", "Barracuda", "White Room", "I Saw Her Standing There", "Land of a Thousand Dances", and "Born to Lose", in addition to covers of her own songs "Tanjō", "Manifesto", "Free Planet", "Alright!!", "Rock and Roll, Hoochie Koo", and "Bitch".

=== 2011: Mind Travel ===
Superfly's song "Beep!!" was used as the theme for the film Manzai Gang, and was on a double A-side single with "Sunshine Sunshine", a song used for the KDDI "Meet the Music 2011" campaign. It was intended that she was to perform "Sunshine Sunshine" live at the Okinawa Namura Hall in Naha, Okinawa Prefecture, on March 20, 2011, with the performance broadcast live over FM52 radio stations Tokyo FM, J-Wave, and FM Okinawa. This performance, however, was postponed due to the 2011 Tōhoku earthquake and tsunami. In response, Ochi recorded an a cappella version of "Sunshine Sunshine" which she posted on her blog on March 18, 2011, and wrote the new song "You & Me", which she posted on her official blog four days later. "You & Me" was subsequently made available for purchase on the iTunes, Recochoku, and wamo! digital music stores and all proceeds went to the Japanese Red Cross's relief efforts in Tōhoku. By May, the song had raised ¥7,831,780 (approx. US$96.8k, €68k, or £59.4k) for the Red Cross.

Superfly also had a national tour in 2011, visiting 32 cities and 35 venues. The tour, dubbed "Mind Traveler", supported the group's third studio album Mind Travel, which was released on June 15, 2011. Superfly also held a free concert at the Yokohama Red Brick Warehouse to celebrate the release, and did a free stream on Ustream.tv. On June 21, 2011, Mind Travel topped the Oricon's weekly album charts having sold over 166,000 copies, making it Superfly's fourth consecutive album to debut at number 1, a feat not duplicated by a female artist since Hikaru Utada in 2004. In August 2011, Superfly announced that the band would go on an arena tour titled "Shout in the Rainbow!!", with shows at the Saitama Super Arena, the Nagoya Nippon Gaishi Hall, and the Osaka-jō Hall. This news was followed by the release of the band's 14th single "Ai o Kurae", a song for their upcoming 4th album.

=== 2012: Force ===
In 2012, Superfly participated in the JAPAN UNITED event with MUSIC 30-member supergroup in recording a cover of the Beatles' "All You Need Is Love" to raise money for reconstruction efforts regarding the aftermath of the 2011 earthquake and tsunami. For the band's 5th anniversary, Superfly released the Shout in the Rainbow!! video album featuring performances from the band's December 2011 arena tour stop at Osaka-jō Hall. Limited editions of the video release included a CD featuring the previously unreleased track "Sasurai no Tabibito" (さすらいの旅人; "Wandering Traveller").

While doing a special live broadcast on Ustream and Nico Nico Douga to celebrate the Shout in the Rainbow!! release, Superfly announced that they would be releasing a fourth studio album titled Force on September 19, 2012. To commemorate the band's five-year anniversary, a special edition of the album including a bonus CD, a vinyl copy of the album, and a commemorative poster Was released along with a standard single-CD edition, a limited two CD edition, and an edition exclusively released through Lawson convenience stores. One week later, Shout in the Rainbow!! would top the Oricon's Blu-ray weekly rankings, making Superfly the fourth ever solo artist to top those charts. After a free live concert at Tokyo's Yoyogi Park with livecasts on various internet services on the release date, Force was supported by a 35-stop concert hall tour called "Superfly Tour 2012 'Live Force'", starting on October 26, 2012.

Superfly has also recorded a duet with Tortoise Matsumoto titled "STARS" which will be used by Fuji Television as its theme song for its broadcasts of the 2012 Summer Olympics. It was released to truetone distributing stores on May 11, 2012, and was released as a single on July 25, 2012. The release of "STARS" was followed by the double A-side single "Kagayaku Tsuki no Yō ni" / "The Bird Without Wings", with its title tracks used as the theme songs for the television drama Summer Rescue and the film Ushijima the Loan Shark, respectively. Force sold 119,000 units in its first week, placing it at number 1 on the Oricon's Weekly charts, making Superfly one of only 4 female solo artists to have five consecutive number 1 debuts on the charts; she is included amongst Namie Amuro (fifth No. 1 in February 2000), Mai Kuraki (January 2004), and Hikaru Utada (June 2006).

=== 2013–2014: Fifth anniversary, Superfly Best, "White Light" ===
The group announced it would release their first best of album on September 25, 2013. During this time, Superfly recorded "Starting Over" which is used by J-WAVE as the theme song for their 25th anniversary. The album was then announced to be simply titled Superfly Best, and includes the 26 singles Superfly has released since their major debut and three new songs: "Starting Over", "Always", and "Bi-Li-Li Emotion". The album sold 157 thousand copies in its first week, earning the number 1 spot on the Oricon. Superfly Best became Superfly's 6th consecutive number 1 album, making Shiho Ochi only the second solo female artist to achieve such a goal. In May 2014, Superfly was chosen to perform the theme song "Live" "for the sequel of the film adaptation of Ushijima the Loan Shark. In September, Superfly performed the theme song for the Tales of Zestiria video game, titled "White Light". Superfly released their 18th single "Ai o Karada ni Fukikonde" in November 2014.

=== 2015: White ===
After the digital release of "White Light" in January 2015, it was announced that Superfly's 5th studio album, White, would be released on May 27, 2015.

=== 2017: 10th Anniversary Love, Peace & Fire ===
In April 2017, Superfly released the 10th Anniversary 3-CD greatest hits set Love, Peace, and Fire, which contained 39 songs selected from 127 tunes by fan voting. A condensed single-disc edition was released in December 2017, with an orchestral version of "Ai wo Komete Hanataba wo".

=== 2019 ===
In June 2019, Superfly released the single "Ambitious", which included the song "覚醒", used in the 2019 Studio Trigger animated feature Promare.

=== 2020: 0 ===
In January 2020, Superfly's sixth album 0 was released, which included "Ambitious", the theme song for the TBS drama Watashi, Teiji de Kaerimasu. The album's limited edition also included a Blu-ray of selected songs from "Superfly Arena Tour 2019 '0'", filmed on October 27, 2019, at Saitama Super Arena.

=== 2021–2024: Transfer to Universal Sigma, Heat Wave ===
In April 2021, Universal Music Japan announced Superfly would transfer from Warner Music Japan to Universal Sigma. The first single under the label, "Voice", was released in April 2022. Superfly's second single "Dynamite" was released in May 2022. In July 2022, it was announced Superfly's song "Presence" would serve as the opening theme for Aoashi. In August 2022, a remix of "Dynamite" by R3hab was released. In November 2022, Warner Japan released a live performance greatest hits album, 15th Anniversary Live Best. The live album includes Superfly's performances from their major tours while under Warner.

In December 2022, Superfly released the song "Farewell". In March 2023, Superfly's seventh studio album, Heat Wave, was announced for release in May 2023.

The Japanese dub of Elemental features a new version of their song "Yasashii Kimochide" as the ending theme.

=== 2025: Concert tour and first cover album ===
Near the end of 2024, Superfly announced a concert tour in Japan. A cover album was also announced, including covers of songs from Super Beaver, Back Number, One Ok Rock and Arashi. The lead single "Irodori", originally recorded by Mr. Children, was released in April. A second single, a cover of Super Beaver's "Hito to Shite", was released the following month. The name of the album, Amazing, and the track listing was later announced. Amazing was release digitally on June 16, while its physical release on June 18. A cover of Mrs. Green Apple's "Boku no Koto" was released as a pre-release promotional single.

== Discography ==
- Superfly (2008)
- Box Emotions (2009)
- Mind Travel (2011)
- Force (2012)
- White (2015)
- 0 (2020)
- Heat Wave (2023)
- Amazing (2025)
