= 2025 in Japanese music =

The year 2025 in Japanese music.

== Debuts ==
=== Debuting groups ===
- Hana
- ZOCX

== Returning from hiatus ==
=== Returning groups ===
- Mameshiba no Taigun

== Number-ones ==
- Oricon number-one albums
- Oricon number-one singles
- Billboard Japan number-one albums
- Billboard Japan Hot 100 number-one singles

== Albums released ==
=== First quarter ===
==== January ====
Date	Album	Artist	Ref.
8	15	Tuki	
8	Strawberry Prince Forever	Strawberry Prince	
15	D.X	Doberman Infinity	
15	Gold	SixTones	
15	More Than Pink	Silent Siren	
22	Apple of My Eye	Nemophila	
22	The Best 2020–2025	Snow Man	
22	Epiphany EP	Miliyah Kato	
22	Friend Chord	Hitorie	
22	Rock On!	Deen	
22	Shinsei Mokuroku	Hoshimachi Suisei	
29	Pieces	Omoinotake	
29	Prezent	Zerobaseone	
29	Time	HY	
31	XDM Unidentified Waves	XG	

==== February ====
Date	Album	Artist	Ref.
5	Awake	NiziU	
5	Dimensional Bridge	Fantastics from Exile Tribe	
5	Legion	Creepy Nuts	
12	Buppu Label 15th Anniversary "Showcase!"	Noriyuki Makihara	
12	Kidoairaku	Takahisa Masuda	
12	Vitamin B	Kanako Momota	
12	Yume Toki	Soraru	
18	D.N.A	Ae! Group	
19	25th the Best – Alive	Ai	
19	Caligula	Passepied	
19	Channel U	Ryokuoushoku Shakai	
19	Double Decades of GR	Granrodeo	
19	Easy Mode	Thelma Aoyama	
19	History of Fishmans	Fishmans	
19	Jet Boy	The Jet Boy Bangerz from Exile Tribe	
19	Project K	Kreva	
19	Win's Film Songs	Win Morisaki	
21	Detox	One Ok Rock	
26	End Re	Endrecheri	
26	Hoshikuzu Bōken-ō	Stardust Revue	
26	Singularity III: Voyage	Takanori Nishikawa	
26	Viraha	Brahman	

==== March ====
Date	Album	Artist	Ref.
5	Aku	Queen Bee	
5	Bitter Candy	Erika Ikuta	
5	Love, Spark, Joy!	Scandal	
5	No More Tragedy	Lovebites	
5	(R)enew	The Rampage from Exile Tribe	
5	Semicolon	Yama	
5	Shape the Water	Flumpool	
12	A.H.O.: Audio Hang Out	West	
12	Hayabusa Jet I	Motoharu Sano & The Coyote Band	
12	Polyphony	Morfonica	
12	Reconnect	Bird	
12	Shine the Way	Fantasy Boys	
12	Wolf	Wolf Howl Harmony from Exile Tribe	
12	XV E.P.	Man with a Mission	
12	Yūsuke desu	Yusuke	
19	Ambitious	Little Glee Monster	
19	Contemporary Emotion	Nana Mizuki	
19	I'm Ready	Kaori Maeda	
19	No Border Hits 2025→2001: The Best of Tokyo Ska Paradise Orchestra	Tokyo Ska Paradise Orchestra	
19	O/N	Jun. K	
19	Soleil	Ryubi Miyase	
19	Thank You So Much	Southern All Stars	
19	Wabisabi	Rottengraffty	
26	Chapter 1	Ballistik Boyz from Exile Tribe	
26	Gunjō Hikō	Dish//	
26	Hump Back	Hump Back	
26	Jelly Bean	Cravity	
26	Live in Metaverse: The Best	Koda Kumi	
26	Miwa	Miwa	
26	More Than Kawaii	@onefive	
26	Sixth Sence	Band Ja Naimon! Maxx Nakayoshi	
26	Sōshoku	Rikako Aida	
26	Time Stew	Wands	
26	Winderlust	W-inds	
29	Ah!!	Towa Tei	

=== Second quarter ===
==== April ====
Date	Album	Artist	Ref.
2	1997	Mucc	
2	Be Classic	JO1	
2	Girls And	Sophia	
8	Ado's Best Adobum	Ado	
9	Ghost	Amazarashi	
9	Supernova	OWV	
16	20 Years	Kaela Kimura	
16	All Time Doo Wop!!	Masayuki Suzuki	
16	Crystal	Hiroki Nanami	
16	EP04	Shiina Natsukawa	
16	Fooocus	Aooo	
16	Guitarhythm VIII	Tomoyasu Hotei	
16	Inversion	Cynhn	
16	Lost Message: Reborn	Tatuya Ishii	
16	Love and Rock Go Together	Hekiru Shiina	
16	Red	Ryosuke Yamada	
16	Strange Pop	Mao Sasagawa	
16	Whose Blue	TK from Ling Tosite Sigure	
23	Completeness	Ave Mujica	
23	Drive 1993–2026: Glay Complete Best	Glay	
23	Humanity	Ten	
23	Prot.30	Taiga Kyomoto	
23	Provoke	Alexandros	
30	Addiction	Sakurazaka46	
30	Against the World	Kep1er	
30	Asobi	Ikimonogakari	
30	Forgotten Shores	Toshiki Kadomatsu	
30	ViVa Idol	Iris	

==== May ====
Date	Album	Artist	Ref.
7	Goroes by Myself 3	Goro Noguchi	
7	Straße	Yuta Orisaka	
7	Why Don't You Bullet Train?	Bullet Train	
14	Gen	Gen Hoshino	
14	Musée	Daisuke Ono	
14	Seimei no Ki: Tree of Life	Masashi Sada	
14	Tegoshi Yuya Singles Best	Yuya Tegoshi	
14	#Twice5	Twice	
21	Magfact	Kis-My-Ft2	
21	Seek	Iri	
21	Unlock the Girl: Bodyguard	Kaori Kishitani	
28	Ame no Hi	Akira Kawashima	
28	Love Never Dies	Misia	
28	Masaka Naku to wa Omowanakatta	The Jet Boy Bangerz from Exile Tribe	

==== June ====
Date	Album	Artist	Ref.
4	Bone Born Bomb	Ano	
4	Eternal Idol, Eternal Youth, Seiko Matsuda: 45th Anniversary Ultimate All Time Best	Seiko Matsuda	
4	Turn the Page	T-Square	
4	Zettaizetsumei	Radwimps	
11	All Singles Tubest: Blue	Tube	
11	All Singles Tubest: White	Tube	
11	Fam	Timelesz	
11	Ika	Tempalay	
11	Isekai: Anime & Video Game Muse	Sarah Àlainn	
11	Mic as One	Hypnosis Mic: Division Rap Battle	
11	Traveling	Sakurako Ohara	
11	What a Wonder Wonder Lan	Personz	
11	Yourself: Attitude	Dezert	
18	Amazing	Superfly	
18	Boundless	Tourbillon	
18	Catch Me If You Can	Makoto Furukawa	
18	Covers III: Sora Amamiya Favorite Songs	Sora Amamiya	
18	Felice	Yukari Tamura	
18	Gang Rise	Gang Parade	
18	Gundam Song Covers: Orchestra	Hiroko Moriguchi	
18	Hollow	Stray Kids	
18	Insignia	Passcode	
18	Kekka Ōrai EP	Kocchi no Kento	
18	Kōkaishi	Tani Yuuki	
18	Psychic File III	Psychic Fever from Exile Tribe	
18	Pulsatilla Cernua	Shota Shimizu	
18	Uta	Rimi Natsukawa	
18	Yui Asaka 40th Anniversary Yui Selection 40 Years Four Seasons Playlist	Yui Asaka	
23	The Origin	INI	
24	All Time Best 25th Anniversary	Crystal Kay	
25	45th Anniversary: Yoshie Selection All Time Best	Yoshie Kashiwabara	
25	A Fraction: V	Ayasa	
25	Encore	Nagi Yanagi	
25	N.D.	Daisuke Namikawa	
25	Romantic!	A.B.C-Z	
25	Seishun Ōka Cover Album	GaGaGa SP	
25	Warn12g	Urashimasakatasen	

=== Third quarter ===
==== July ====
Date	Album	Artist	Ref.
2	Anri the Best Blue	Anri	
2	Bon Bon Voyage	Naniwa Danshi	
2	Epiphany	Uverworld	
2	Inoue Sonoko Best: #27	Sonoko Inoue	
2	Shaking	Miho Okasaki	
2	Sunburst	Suchmos	
2	Taiyō	Begin	
2	Vivid	Myname	
2	Yahan no Jūsei	Mao	
7	10	Mrs. Green Apple	
9	Ame ga, Yamu Made	Kiyono Yasuno	
9	Back 2 da Unity	Da Pump	
9	Hatsune Miku: Magical Mirai 2025 Official Album	Various artists	
9	Love Paradox	Shizuka Kudo	
9	Streak	Shōya Chiba	
14	Cosmic Resonance	Fantastics from Exile Tribe	
16	4Elements	Def Tech	
16	Atarashii Gakkō no Suzume	Atarashii Gakko!	
16	Funk Fire	BRADIO	
16	Greatest Five	Rip Slyme	
16	Isao Sasaki Debut 65th Anniversary Best Collection	Isao Sasaki	
16	JAM Project Best Collection XV Final Countdown	JAM Project	
16	One Bite	Nexz	
16	The Primals – Dark Decades	Masayoshi Soken	
16	This Is My Hometown	Kobukuro	
23	Anemone	Tomoyo Harada	
23	One Ok Rock 20th Anniversary Vinyl LP Box	One Ok Rock	
23	Re:Birthday	Aya Uchida	
23	Too Much!	Riho Sayashi	
23	Yoko Minamino 40th Anniversary Records	Yoko Minamino	
25	Stardust Forever	Ballistik Boyz from Exile Tribe	
25	Summer Cool-Off at Tokyo Disney Resort	Tokyo Disney Resort	
30	Be Alright	Ive	
30	The Best of Alicia Keys	Alicia Keys	
30	Hare	Azusa Tadokoro	
30	Life Goes On E.P.	Lyrical School	
30	Qe	Azusa Tadokoro	
30	Sunny Beat	Sunny Day Service	
30	Tokyo Girls' Style	Tokyo Girls' Style	
31	Glass Heart	Tenblank	
31	yo,	Peterparker69	

==== August ====
Date	Album	Artist	Ref.
6	The Best of 30 Years	Taro Hakase	
6	Bouquet	Ryota Katayose	
6	Fiesta	Anju Inami	
6	Ginreigozen	Onmyo-Za	
6	Henshin	NEWS	
6	Irodori	Ayaka Ōhashi	
6	Le 13e	Paris Match	
6	Music Moment 2	Seiko Niizuma	
6	Naked 4 Satan	Tempalay	
6	Rabbit Girl	Shuka Saitō	
6	Roots	Nagisa Aoyama	
6	Tube×	Tube	
8	Kana Nishino Song Selection	Kana Nishino	
8	Metal Forth	Babymetal	
9	All Singles & Other Best 30 Selection	Globe	
13	Koto no Ha Wonderland	Rinu	
13	Mono-poly	Ohashi Trio	
13	Twenty//Next	May'n	
13	Who's in the House?	DYGL	
18	Nebula Romance: Part II	Perfume	
20	A/Code	Aimi	
20	Aoi Works III: Best Collection 2019–2025	Aoi Teshima	
20	Bouquet de Cinéma	Cocomi	
20	Doors	Hitomi Yaida	
20	Flying Best 2	Nanaoakari	
20	It Is a Colorful Transparent Blue	Sangatsu no Phantasia	
20	Kame Best	Kazuya Kamenashi	
20	Metro Love	Park Yuchun	
20	Sakamoto Kyu	Kyu Sakamoto	
22	Non Label	Neo Japonism	
26	Enemy	Twice	
27	BestSail	TrySail	
27	Evolution	Lun8	
27	Hiroyuki Takami the Historian	Hiroyuki Takami	
27	Jam	UMake (Kent Itō and Yoshiki Nakajima)	
27	Meteora	Shouta Aoi and Hiroki Nanami	
27	Raimei	Inuwasi	
27	True Blue	Casiopea	
27	Yousti	Yousti	

==== September ====
Date	Album	Artist	Ref.
1	Beginning	Park Hyung-sik	
1	Who I Am	Me:I	
2	Wonder!	Ayaka	
3	28	Asca	
3	Iro	Seo In-guk	
3	Karei	Crazy Ken Band	
3	Liberty Bus	Hitomi Shimatani	
3	Renarrate	Non	
3	Share	Daiki Yamashita and Tasuku Hatanaka	
3	Travel Record	Inori Minase	
3	Turquoise	Inori Minase	
5	Prema	Fujii Kaze	
10	The Baddest IV & Timeless Hits	Toshinobu Kubota	
10	Empire Code	Ma55ive the Rampage	
10	Gastronomy	Valshe	
10	In My Mind	Doping Panda	
10	Raise	Koichi Domoto	
10	Tiny Dawn	Pedro	
12	Psycho Junk	Sway	
17	Ashes to Light	Ateez	
17	Dark Side	Sid	
17	Homecoming	Kizuna Ai	
17	Instinct	F.T. Island	
17	Koshō Shita Kuruma	Sard Underground	
17	Penta+Logue	Dialogue+	
17	Roar	Orbit	
17	Shiawase no Katachi	Sung Si-kyung	
22	Dera Journey!!!!	Team Shachi	
22	No.II	Number i	
24	18	Cali≠Gari	
24	Holic	Hina Tachibana	
24	I Believe	Eikichi Yazawa	
24	Kawaii Girl	Wednesday Campanella	
24	New Era	Girls²	
24	Pulse	Tokino Sora	
24	Reprise	Lead	
24	S's	Satomi	
26	Hibi	Chanyeol	

=== Fourth quarter ===
==== October ====
Date	Album	Artist	Ref.
1	Baibai Fight!	Candy Tune	
1	Infinity	826aska	
1	Pianouta / Project(emU)	Hiroyuki Sawano	
1	Saku	Onew	
1	SecretHimitsuBimil	TripleS	
3	I-dle	I-dle	
9	Anew	Radwimps	
9	Answer	Angela	
9	Brand New Best 2025	Mardelas	
9	Collector	Itzy	
9	Don't Laugh It Off	Hitsujibungaku	
9	Heart	Reona	
9	Instinto	Chage	
9	Mugen	Show-Ya	
15	Collection	Maki Goto	
15	Journey	Akari Kitō	
15	Otogimashou	Reni Takagi	
15	Seiko Diamond: Karuho Kureda Works	Seiko Matsuda	
15	Seiko Feelings: Eiichi Ohtaki Works	Seiko Matsuda	
15	Seiko Harmony: Haruomi Hosono Works	Seiko Matsuda	
15	Seiko Invitation: Kazuo Zaitsu Works	Seiko Matsuda	
15	Underground Insanity	Ali Project	
15	Watashi to Hiromi: Fan Selection	Hiromi Go	
17	Rhapsody	Jaejoong	
20	Starkissed	Tomorrow X Together	
22	Aimai: Fantachy Selection	Kome Kome Club	
22	Kaikō	Ko Shibasaki	
22	Kuromi in My Head	Kuromi	
22	Lost God of Sasori	Ling Tosite Sigure	
22	M30: Your Best	Maaya Sakamoto	
22	Now Rise	Masaki Satō	
22	Rock&Roll Lady Girl	Aguri Ōnishi	
22	Scooooop	Band-Maid	
22	Shitsuren Monochrome	Aguri Ōnishi	
22	A Story Beyond	Devil Anthem.	
26	Persona	Yuta	
27	Kōgaku	Acidman	
29	Be:st	Be:First	
29	Crazy Romantic	A.B.C-Z	
29	Dawn	Chansung	
29	Iconik	Zerobaseone	
29	Jambo Japan	The Cro-Magnons	
29	Samurai Diva	Yuko Suzuhana	
29	Unzip	Kaku P-Model	
31	Ooh-La-La	Chihiro Yamanaka	

==== November ====
Date	Album	Artist	Ref.
5	Nuance	Soma Saito	
5	Onkochishin	Snow Man	
5	Su	Subaru Shibutani	
5	Tokyo Mission Start	Kiss of Life	
12	Aitai	Tetsuya Kakihara	
12	Dear Mysteries	Tomoo	
12	FYOP	B'z	
12	Kan B-Side Collection	Kan	
12	Keep Your Smile!	Angerme	
12	No Bean, No Bark	Mameshiba no Taigun	
12	Unformel	Nana Okada	
12	Yozora ni Kakaru Niji	A Flood of Circle	
18	Wormhole / Yumi AraI	Yumi Matsutoya	
19	Dear Jubilee: Radwimps Tribute	Various artists	
19	Face	Mamoru Miyano	
19	Freivor	Reina Washio	
19	Jumble!!	Shun'ichi Toki	
19	Kiina	Kiyoshi Hikawa	
19	Let's Dance	The Jet Boy Bangerz from Exile Tribe	
19	Mahoroba	Ningen Isu	
19	Moments	Hilcrhyme	
19	New Emotion	NiziU	
19	Queen of Idol	Festive	
19	Seishun Kobushi: Yakusoku to Shōdō	Ukka	
21	Okinawan Wuman	Awich	
25	Labo-Ratory	Yui Ogura	
26	Gate of Heaven	Unlucky Morpheus	
26	Landerblue	Tomori Kusunoki	
26	Screaming Newborn Baby	Hi-Standard	
26	S Say	Hey! Say! JUMP	
26	Welcome to the Dying Season	Jun Maeda and Nagi Yanagi	

==== December ====
Date	Album	Artist	Ref.
1	'S Travelers	Travis Japan	
3	ABC Yosō	22/7	
3	Acoustic Album 1	Super Beaver	
3	Mouse Spirits	Kyuso Nekokami	
3	Orange Pekoe All Time Best 2001–2025 Shunkashūtō, Hibi Eika	Orange Pekoe	
3	Space Cowboy	Takanori Iwata	
3	Your Flower: Uta no Hanataba o	Hiroko Moriguchi	
10	Beyooooonds 3rd	Beyooooonds	
10	Buddy: 20th Anniversary Best Album "Originals & Collaborations"	Depapepe	
10	Hayabusa Jet II	Motoharu Sano & the Coyote Band	
10	Jyu-Gonen	Yu Takahashi	
10	Laugh	Lilas Ikuta	
10	Mai Kuraki B-Side Best: This is Our life	Mai Kuraki	
10	Umi Ippai ni Furishikiru Hoshi	Aqua Timez	
12	Success Is the Best Revenge	Sky-Hi	
15	Magenter	IMP	
17	6ix Piece	Generations from Exile Tribe	
17	Assemble	Ji Chang-wook	
17	Curry Rice	Saucy Dog	
17	Heavy Metal Commander	Sex Machineguns	
17	Snove	Enjin	
17	Sorairo End Roll	Colon	
24	3650.zip	Wooyoung	
24	Gekirin	Polkadot Stingray	
24	Kimi ga Ikiru Imi	The Alfee	
24	Starring	King & Prince	
24	Ultra Pop	Misato Watanabe	
26	Circusm	Fukase	

== Disbanding and retiring artists ==
=== Disbanding ===
- Bis
- Dempagumi.inc
- FlowBack
- Kankaku Pierrot
- KAT-TUN
- The Pillows
- Tokio

=== Going on hiatus ===
- Mameshiba no Taigun Tonai Bousho a.k.a. MonsterIdol
- Perfume

== See also ==
- 2025 in Japan
  - Music of Japan
