= Suki Suki Seijin =

2020 single by Strawberry Prince

Single by Strawberry Prince

from the album Strawberry Prince
- Language: Japanese
- Released: June 22, 2020
- Genre: J-pop
- Length: 3:57
- Label: STPR
- Songwriter: Nayutalien
- Producer: Nanamori

Strawberry Prince singles chronology
"Mabushigariya" (2020)	"Suki Suki Seijin" (2020)	"Great Cosmic Rendezvous" (2020)

Music video
- "Suki Suki Seijin" on YouTube

"Suki Suki Seijin" (Japanese: スキスキ星人; lit. "Love Love Alien") is a song recorded by the Japanese boy band Strawberry Prince. It was released to music platforms on June 22, 2020, as a single from Strawberry Prince's third album, eponymously titled Strawberry Prince. A J-pop song about love, "Suki Suki Seijin" was written by Nayutalien and promoted with an animated music video released a day before the single. The song reached No. 68 on the Billboard Japan Hot 100 with two appearances. Initial live performances of the song primarily occurred through online concerts due to cancellations in the COVID-19 pandemic. In 2023, Strawberry Prince performed the song on the 74th NHK Kōhaku Uta Gassen, the group's Kōhaku debut.

== Background and release ==
A 3 minute and 57 seconds-long sweet J-pop and dance song with themes about love, "Suki Suki Seijin" was written and arranged by Japanese composer and lyricist Nayutalien. Produced by Strawberry Prince group leader Nanamori, "Suki Suki Seijin" was described in press as a sequel of sorts to the song "Strawberry Planet" that Nayutalien had written on Strawberry Prince's second album Strawberry Next! (2020).

"Suki Suki Seijin" was unveiled with an animated music video on June 21, 2020, directed by Nayutalien and created by Eruī, with illustration from Nanao. The song was released to music download and streaming services the next day, printed under Strawberry Prince's own label STPR Records. "Suki Suki Seijin" is the second track on Strawberry Prince's third album, eponymously titled Strawberry Prince (2020). The song charted for two weeks on the Billboard Japan Hot 100: it debuted on the week of June 24, placing at No. 68, before subsequently falling to No. 90 and then out of the top 100 on its second and third weeks.

== Live performances ==
Due to restrictions of the COVID-19 pandemic, Strawberry Prince suspended a Tokyo Dome tour they had scheduled for August, instead opting for an online concert; Strawberry Memory in SutoPuri Channel! Vol. 2!! was broadcast August 27, 2020, featuring a debut performance of "Suki Suki Seijin". On November 2, 2020, Strawberry Prince announced that they would appear on NHK's Numa ni Hamatte Kite Mita on November 11 – the release day of their eponymous album – to give a debut television performance of "Suki Suki Seijin". With their dedicated touring for the album at the Nippon Budokan canceled due to the pandemic, the group next performed the song during a series of two online concert – Strawberry Memory in Virtual! Vol. 1 and 2 – in April and August 2021.

When the group returned to physical touring with Strawberry Memory - Vol. Next!!!! in 2022, "Suki Suki Seijin" was the second song they performed during their "revenge" Tokyo Dome performance on May 4. The group has performed "Suki Suki Seijin" during all subsequent concerts, minus the Christmas-timed Strawberry Party!! Vol.2: Christmas Live in December 2022.

On November 13, 2023, Strawberry Prince was announced as a participant of the 74th iteration of NHK's annual New Year's Eve television special Kōhaku Uta Gassen, to be the group's Kōhaku debut. The group revealed "Suki Suki Seijin" as their song for the event via X on December 22. The December 26-revealed setlist showed that Strawberry Prince would perform as the show's sixth act, serving as the fourth performance for the White Team. The performance, hosted at the NHK Hall on December 31, saw Strawberry Prince perform as 3D holograms of their avatars, transmitted by the actual members from a different studio in real-time. As they sang the song, large CG hearts floated around the stage whilst Colon brought out a treasure chest, shooting out confetti and party popper tape. In the chorus, Rinu and Root moved to dance alongside show hosts Hiroiki Ariyoshi, Kanna Hashimoto, and Minami Hamabe, before the song ended with Satomi wishing viewers a happy New Year. The group performed in the absence of Nanamori and Jel, who were on temporary leave.

== Personnel ==
Credits adapted from Apple Music and YouTube.

Strawberry Prince

- Nanamori – vocals, producer
- Jel – vocals
- Satomi – vocals
- Colon – vocals
- Rinu – vocals
- Root – vocals

Other personnel

- Nayutalien – songwriting, arrangement, video director
- Eruī – video
- Nanao – illustration

== Charts ==
Weekly chart performance for "Suki Suki Seijin" (2020)
Chart (2020)	Peak position
Japan (Billboard Japan Hot 100)	68
