= Rainbow-Colored History =

2023 extended play by Strawberry Prince

EP by Strawberry Prince
- Released: July 31, 2023
- Genre: J-pop
- Length: 28:19
- Language: Japanese
- Label: STPR

Strawberry Prince chronology
Here We Go!! (2022)	Rainbow-Colored History (2023)	Strawberry Prince Forever (2025)

Singles from Rainbow-Colored History
- 1. "Chocolate Love" Released: February 5, 2023; 2. "The Happiest Memory" Released: March 5, 2023; 3. "Hanamirai" Released: April 2, 2023

Rainbow-Colored History (Japanese: ニジイロヒストリー, Hepburn: Niji-iro Hisutorī; lit. Rainbow-Colored History) is a digital-exclusive extended play (EP) by J-pop group Strawberry Prince, released on July 31, 2023, to celebrate the group's seventh anniversary. The EP is opened by the titular track "Rainbow-Colored History", which lyrically expresses gratitude to fans. The track list consists of theme songs recorded by Strawberry Prince for different projects, songs from their Here We Go!! tour in early 2023, and new tracks. The EP was primarily composed and written by group member Root and features guest appearances from TeddyLoid and HoneyWorks.

Rainbow-Colored History opened at first place on Japanese digital album charts in August, with over 1,400 downloads. The EP was supported by three singles – "Chocolate Love", "The Happiest Memory", and "Hanamirai" – which were premiered throughout the Here We Go!! tour. The EP's release was promoted by three music videos, released from early June to late July.

== Background and contents ==
Strawberry Prince – in 2023 consisting of Satomi, Colon, Rinu, and Root (Note: Nanamori and Jel were named inactive – but not former – members of Strawberry Prince from 2022 to 2024.) – was formed in June 2016. Rainbow-Colored History commemorates the group's seventh anniversary. The opening titular track heads the celebration: it depicts seven rainbow colors, representing the group's seven years, as the group sings of gratitude towards listeners. Rinu described Rainbow-Colored History as filled with songs and memories from their Here We Go!! tour in early 2023, new songs intended to make listeners joy, and "sparkly and fun" tracks relating to the group's new challenges.

"STPRQuest" is the opening to the group's own TV show, SutoPuri Quest, which had been renewed and renamed on Strawberry Prince's anniversary. The theme is a pop song set in the world of a role-playing game and features "chattering" among the singers on certain lines. "Re STARt" is an insert song for the anime film Re:Stars: Mirai e Tsunagu Futatsu no Kiraboshi, which stars Rinu in a lead role. Rinu expressed happiness to perform the song as a member of Strawberry Prince, as he had initially felt nervous, despite excitement, following his casting. "The Happiest Memory" is the group's first graduation-themed song; it aims to encourage listeners to run towards the future whilst remembering the joys and sorrows they have shared with friends. "Hanamirai" (lit. Flower Future) is a "warm", mid-tempo ballad song intended to relax listeners during the Autumn enrollment season, described by Rinu as "a time of expectation and uncertainty."

Many tracks on the EP, including the lead track, were created by Root, like the previous year's anniversary single "Strawberry Smile Magic". Root created the songs with lyricist Toku and composer Matsu; on "STPRQuest" they were joined on the lyrics by Rinu, who penned the song's chattering. Music producer TeddyLoid served as composer and lyricist on the "summer night" song "Yura Yura" (lit. Swaying), marking his third collaboration with Strawberry Prince. "Chocolate Love" is the theme to Strawberry Prince's second candy collaboration with food company Meiji. It and "The Happiest Memory" were composed and written by music duo HoneyWorks, who had previously tackled "Seishun Chocolate", the theme to Strawberry Prince's first collaboration with Meiji, in 2022.

== Promotion and release ==
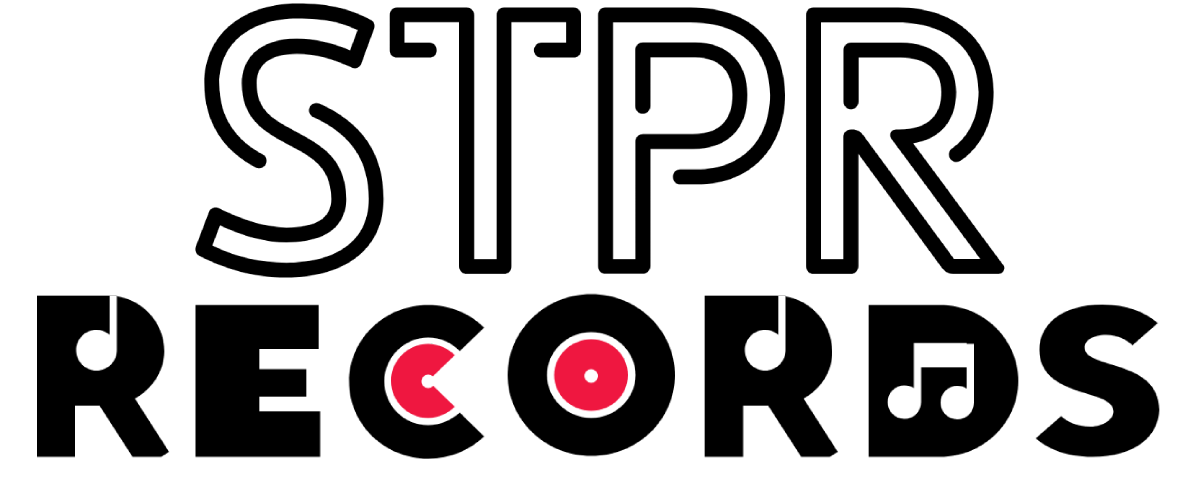
STPR Records logo

Before the EP's release, "Chocolate Love", "The Happiest Memory", and "Hanamirai" were made available as singles. The songs' music videos had been unveiled throughout the Here We Go!! tour: "Chocolate Love" was shown at the Pia Arena MM in late January; "The Happiest Memory" at the Yokohama Arena in March; and "Hanamirai" at the Saitama Super Arena in April.

On July 23, Strawberry Prince uploaded a preview video for the album to their YouTube channel. It was announced that the next day, four songs – the titular track, "STPRQuest", "Yura Yura", and "ReSTARt" – would release early, alongside a campaign presenting a special phone wallpaper to listeners who pre-save the EP on Apple Music or Spotify. Two days before the release of the EP, Strawberry Prince gave a debut performance of "Yura Yura" on the NHK music program Venue101 Presents. Rainbow-Colored History was released as a digital EP on July 31, 2023. The release was handled by STPR Records, the label managing Strawberry Prince and related artists. The EP opened at first place on the weekly Billboard Japan and Oricon download charts dated August 9 and 14, respectively, reaching over 1,400 downloads. It dropped out of the Oricon chart's 50 spots after two consecutive weeks, but stayed within Billboard Japan's 100 spots for three weeks.

A music video for the "Rainbow-Colored History" song was released on June 4, alongside other anniversary-related announcements. It was followed by a music video for "STPRQuest" – handled by returning director Eruī – on July 2, and a video for "Yura Yura" on July 30. According to music news websites, the video for "Yura Yura" was conceptualized with the idea of "summer memories": it features the four members of Strawberry Prince spending a summer night in a real-life town, performing a choreographed dance, before the video ends with a fireworks show.

== Track listing ==
No.	Title	Lyrics	Music	Arrangement	Length
1.	"Rainbow-Colored History" (ニジイロヒストリー, Niji-iro Hisutorī)	Root; Toku	Root; Matsu	Matsu	3:15
2.	"STPRQuest"	Root; Rinu; Toku	Root; Matsu	Matsu	2:38
3.	"FF&Flapping"	Root; Toku	Root; Matsu	Matsu	3:20
4.	"Yura Yura" (ゆらゆら, Yura Yura)	TeddyLoid	TeddyLoid	TeddyLoid	3:55
5.	"Re STARt" (Re☆STARt)	Root; Toku	Root; Matsu	Matsu	4:42
6.	"Chocolate Love" (チョコレートはんぶんこ, Chokorēto Hanbunko)	HoneyWorks	HoneyWorks	HoneyWorks	3:40
7.	"Hanamirai" (ハナミライ, Hanamirai)	Root; Toku	Root; Matsu	Matsu	3:10
8.	"The Happiest Memory" (最幸の宝物, Saikō no Takaramono)	HoneyWorks	HoneyWorks	HoneyWorks	3:39
Total length:					28:19

== Charts ==
Chart performance for Rainbow-Colored History
Chart (2023)	Peak position
Japan Download Albums (Billboard Japan)	1
Japan Digital Albums (Oricon)	1
