= 74th NHK Kōhaku Uta Gassen =

Japanese television show

- Also known as: 74th NHK Red & White Year-End Song Festival
- 第74回NHK紅白歌合戦: ボーダレス －超えてつながる大みそか－ 74th NHK Red & White Year-End Song Festival "Borderless: New Year's Eve That Transcends and Connects"
- Genre: Music; variety; special
- Created by: Tsumoru Kondo
- Presented by: Hiroiki Ariyoshi; Kanna Hashimoto; Minami Hamabe; Kozo Takase
- Opening theme: "Grand Opening", by Fox Capture Plan
- Ending theme: "Hotaru no Hikari"
- Composers: Takahiro Kaneko (arrangement); Tsunaki Mihara (arrangement); Ludwig van Beethoven (incidental music)
- Country of origin: Japan
- Original language: Japanese

Production
- Production locations: NHK Hall, Tokyo
- Running time: 260 minutes
- Production company: NHK Enterprise Inc.

Original release
- Network: NHK-G; NHK World Premium (outside Japan); TV Japan (USA & Canada only); NHK Radio 1
- Release: December 31, 2023

The 74th NHK Kōhaku Uta Gassen (第74回NHK紅白歌合戦, Dai Nanajūyon Kai Enu Eichi Kei Kōhaku Uta Gassen) was the Reiwa 5 edition of NHK's New Year's Eve TV special Kōhaku Uta Gassen, held on December 31, 2023. The show was broadcast live from NHK Hall. The Red Team won the contest.

== Events leading up to broadcast ==
On September 27, NHK released the broadcast times. The show would start at 19:20, and wrap up at 23:45 (JST), with a 5-minute break for the latest news. On October 6, NHK announced the hosts, who would be Hiroiki Ariyoshi, Kanna Hashimoto, Minami Hamabe, and Kozo Takase. Additionally, this year's theme was stated to be "Borderless: New Year's Eve That Transcends and Connects", that would mark the beginning of the celebrations of the 70th anniversary of the first television broadcast in Japan.

For the first time since 1980, no artists belonging to Smile Up, Inc. (formerly Johnny & Associates) were scheduled to appear on this edition of the Kōhaku Uta Gassen. This was known after the announcement of the list of participants on November 13. The absence of talent from the agency is a consequence of the juvenile sex abuse scandals from Johnny Kitagawa.

On December 4, 2023 Official Hige Dandism announced in advance that their participation song would be "Chessboard". Furthermore, the group announced that they were looking for middle schoolers for performing support. Application videos can be sent between December 4–18 on the contests official homepage.

On December 20, 2023, the guest judges and the voting method were announced. Two days later, the song titles were published. On December 26, the performance order was revealed. Atarashii Gakko would be the show opener, while Misia would do another Ootori.

Due to copyright issues, both Milet and Man with a Mission's performances could not be shown on the NHK World Premium global simulcast, as they contained scenes from the Demon Slayer anime, whose global rights belong to Muse Communication (outside Japan) and Crunchyroll (outside Asia). Instead of performances, the artist's photo was shown. 10-Feet's performance was also not shown on the same broadcast, as it used scenes from the film "The First Slam Dunk".

== Artist lineup ==
Key
Debuting artists
Returning artists
Special performances

List of 74th NHK Kōhaku Uta Gassen performances
Red Team				White Team			
Order	Artist	Appearance	Song	Order	Artist	Appearance	Song
First half
Fox Capture Plan – "Grand Opening"
1	Atarashii Gakko!	1	"Otona Blue"	2	JO1	2	"Newsmile"
—N/a				3	Masayuki Suzuki	6 (Note: Suzuki previously participated once as member of Rats & Star.)	"Megumi no Hito"
5	Perfume	16	"Fake It"	4	Stray Kids	1	"Case 143" (Japanese version)
7	Yoshimi Tendo	28	"Dōtonbori Ninjō"	6	Strawberry Prince	1	"Suki Suki Seijin"
9	Ryokuoushoku Shakai	2	"Character"	8	Tatsuya Kitani	1	"Where Our Blue Is"
10	Sakurazaka46	3 (Note: It was the group's seventh participation if included four times of former Keyakizaka46.)	"Start Over!"	11	Jyunretsu	6	"Datte Meguri Aetanda" (NHK+ version)
12	Ano	1	"Chu, Tayōsei"	13	Be:First	2	"Boom Boom Back"
14	Juju	2	"Toki no Nagare ni Mi o Makase"	—N/a			
15	NiziU	4	"Make You Happy"	—N/a			
16	Le Sserafim	2 (Note: Member Sakura previously participated once as HKT48, and thrice as AKB48.)	"Unforgiven" (Japanese version)	17	Keisuke Yamauchi	9	"Koi Suru Machikado"
18	Nogizaka46	9	"Ohitorisama Tengoku"	19	Hiromi Go	36	"2 Oku 4 Sen Man no Hitomi" (Breaking SP)
20	Milet	4	"Koi Kogare" (with Man with a Mission)	21	Man with a Mission	1	"Kizuna no Kiseki" (with Milet)
23	Kaori Mizumori	21	"Hyūga Misaki" (Kōhaku Domino Challenge SP)	22	Seventeen	1	"Fallin' Flower"
Hama Iku (Ryūichi Hamaie and Erika Ikuta) (1) (Note: Erika Ikuta previously participated seven times as member of idol group Nogizaka46.) – "Beat De Tohi"
—N/a				24	Yo Oizumi	1	"Ano Sora ni Tatsu Tō no Yō ni"
Second half
26	Fuyumi Sakamoto	35	"Yozakura Oshichi"	25	Mrs. Green Apple	1	"Dancehall"
27	MiSaMo	1 (Note: The members of MiSaMo have previously participated 4 times as members of Twice.)	"Do Not Touch"	28	10-Feet	1	"Dai Zero Kan"
NewJeans (1) – "OMG", "ETA", and "Ditto" medley
Disney 100 Years Special Medley: Kanna Hashimoto and Minami Hamabe – "Someday My Prince Will Come"; Yo Oizumi, Motoki Ohmori (Mrs. Green Apple), and Le Sserafim – "Under the Sea"; Koichi Yamadera, Sakurazaka46, and Stray Kids – "Friend Like Me"; Erika Ikuta – "This Wish"; Kōhaku Yushi no Minna-san (Ano, Sayuri Ishikawa, Jyunretsu, Masayuki Suzuki, Mrs. Green Apple) – "It's a Small World"
30	Ringo Sheena	8 (Note: Sheena previously participated twice as member of rock band Tokyo Jihen.)	"Marunouchi Sadistic (Sasuga ni Shogyōmujō-hen)"	29	Official Hige Dandism	4	"Chessboard"
—N/a				31	Yuzu	14	"Beautiful"
Queen + Adam Lambert (1) – "Don't Stop Me Now"
—N/a				32	Hiroshi Miyama	9	"Donka Zaka" (7th Road to the Kendama World Record)
34	Superfly	7	"Tamashii Revolution"	33	Gen Hoshino	9	"Life"
35	Ran Itō	1 (Note: Itō previously participated thrice as member of idol trio Candies.)	"Candies 50th Anniversary Kōhaku SP Medley"	—N/a			
Yoshiki (14) – "Endless Rain ~ Rusty Nail"
TV Broadcasting 70 Years Special Project: Terebi ga Todoketa Meikyoku-tachi: Pocket Biscuits and Black Biscuits (2) – "Yellow Yellow Happy" + "Timing"; Hiroko Yakushimaru (3) – "Sailor-fuku to Kikanjū"; Akira Terao (3) – "Ruby no Yubiwa"
36	Ado	1 (Note: Ado previously participated the 73rd NHK Kōhaku Uta Gassen as Uta, a character from One Piece Film: Red.)	"Show"	—N/a			
38	Aimyon	5	"Ai no Hana"	37	Elephant Kashimashi	1 (Note: Member Hiroji Miyamoto previously participated once as soloist and once for special show)	"Ore-tachi no Ashita"
40	Sayuri Ishikawa	45	"Tsugaru Kaikyō Fuyugeshiki"	39	Masashi Sada	22	"Cosmos"
42	Yoasobi	3	"Idol"	41	Fumiya Fujii	6 (Note: Fujii previously participated nine times as member of the Checkers.)	"True Love" "Shiroi Kumo no Yō ni" (with Hiroiki Ariyoshi)
44	Misia	8	"Kōhaku Special 2023"	43	Masaharu Fukuyama	16	" 'Hello' ~ 'Sōbō' Kōhaku Special Medley"

== Voting ==
=== Voting method ===
As in the previous years, the winning team is determined via a 3-point voting system. This voting system includes judges vote, attendance vote and television voting. The winner of these votings receives one point per voting won.

While the jury members and the attendance at NHK Hall are only able to cast their vote once the television voters are able to vote up to five times depending on for how long they are watching the show.

The vote can be cast via remote control if the receiver is connected to the internet. Due to a rule change revolving around the jury vote where the judges are divided into two groups consisting out of four people each it could be possible that the result may be remis for the first time in the show's history.

=== Judges ===
On December 20, 2023, the eight members of the guest jury were announced. The jury consists out of following people:

- Haruka Kitaguchi — Sports athlete (Javelin throw)
- Shingo Kunieda — former Wheelchair tennis player
- Masato Sakai — Actor
- Machi Tawara — Lyricist and poet
- Shinobu Terajima — Actress
- Nobuhiro Terada — former Ballet dancer, art director of National Ballet of Ukraine
- Bakarhythm — Comedian
- Yuriko Yoshitaka — Actress

=== Results ===
Voting method	Results		Points
Voting method	Team Red	Team White	Points
Guest judge voting	7	1	1
Audience voting	1.453	883	1
Viewership voting	3,943,182	2,457,277	1
Winner	RED TEAM		3-0

=== Ratings ===
According to Kanto region viewers, the show had the worst ratings overall with 29% in its front part, and 31.9% in its back part, compared to the 73rd edition, which had 35.3%.
