= Pink Babies =

Japanese pop group

Pink Babies ピンク・ベイビーズ
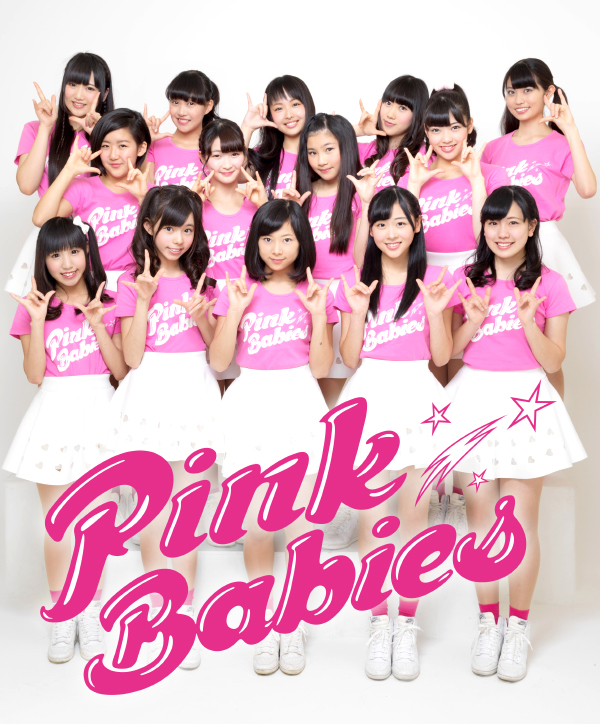

Background information
- Origin: Tokyo, Japan
- Genres: J-pop
- Years active: 2014–2017
- Labels: Pan Pacific Entertainment; Space Shower Music
- Past members: Saho Arakawa; Mayu Asada; Yukari Furukawa; Rina Kuriyama; Kotona Masaki; Rio Ohmori; Yui Sakurai; Kotono Satō; Rio Shiseki; Mayu Suganuma; Chinatsu Suzuki; Sara Suzuki; Nanaho Yabuta; Aina Yoshida

Pink Babies (ピンク・ベイビーズ, Pinku Beibīzu) was a 14-member Japanese female idol group that was active from 2014 to 2017. Created by songwriter/producer Shunichi Tokura as part of his "Pan-Pacific Project", the group was a tribute to the 1970s J-pop duo Pink Lady, performing only songs written by Tokura.

== History ==
Pink Babies opened their YouTube channel on May 28, 2014. They released their debut digital single "Wanted" on July 16 and hosted their debut concert at Mt. Rainier Hall Shibuya Pleasure Pleasure on August 24. On April 16, 2015, the group was appointed as "Delicious Japan! Junior PR Ambassadors of Food" (おいしい日本！食のジュニアPR大使, Oishī Nihon! Shoku no Junia PR Taishi) by the Ministry of Agriculture, Forestry and Fisheries.

Pink Babies also performed internationally in 2014 and 2015, notably at the Japan Expo in France and at the Anime Festival Asia in Indonesia.

On February 25, 2016, Pink Babies made a guest appearance at the Tokyo Marathon Expo at Tokyo Big Sight.

On August 31, 2016, the group released their first CD single "Nagisa no Sindbad", which peaked at No. 5 on Oricon's Indies Chart. By this time, the lineup was reduced to 10 members. On September 26, seven members of the group formed the spin-off project "Pink Babies EX" and released their cover of the Linda Yamamoto song "Neraiuchi".

Pink Babies' second and final CD single "UFO", released on February 15, 2017, hit No. 1 on Oricon's Indies Chart. Two months later, with eight members remaining, the group announced their disbandment, with their final show held at Mt. Rainier Hall Shibuya Pleasure Pleasure on May 26.

On September 3, 2018, Rio Ohmori, Rio Shiseki, Sara Suzuki, Chinatsu Suzuki, Kotono Satō, Mayu Suganuma, and Aina Yoshida reunited for one night only for the NHK BS Premium special Kokoro no Kajin-tachi (こころの歌人たち; Singers of the Heart) dedicated to songwriter/producer Shunichi Tokura. The special aired on September 30.

=== Post-disbandment ===
Ohmori was a member of the "Love Cocchi" division of the idol group Last Idol (ラストアイドル, Rasuto Aidoru) until its disbandment in 2022. Satō is with the rock idol quartet Flowlight. Suganuma and Yoshida formed their own duo MayuAina. Yui Sakurai pursued a solo career before joining the idol group My Dear Darlin' (a sister group of FES☆TIVE) in January 2020.

== Former members ==
Final lineup on May 26, 2017

- Yukari Furukawa (古川 友佳理, Furukawa Yukari)* (born May 10, 1997)
- Rio Ohmori (大森 莉緒, Ōmori Rio)* (born December 22, 2001)
- Kotono Satō (佐藤 琴乃, Satō Kotono) (born November 30, 1999)
- Rio Shiseki (始関 琉央, Shiseki Rio) (born January 27, 2002)
- Mayu Suganuma (菅沼 茉祐, Suganuma Mayu)* (born December 15, 1996)
- Chinatsu Suzuki (鈴木 千夏, Suzuki Chinatsu)* (born August 16, 2000)
- Sara Suzuki (鈴木 咲良, Suzuki Sara) (born December 20, 2000)
- Aina Yoshida (吉田 亜衣奈, Yoshida Aina)* (born March 17, 1997)

Graduated on April 9, 2017

- Saho Arakawa (荒川 紗穂, Arakawa Saho)* (born October 8, 1998)
- Yui Sakurai (櫻井 優衣, Sakurai Yui)* (born February 21, 2000)

Graduated at the 2015 Tokyo Idol Festival

- Mayu Asada (朝田 茉侑, Asada Mayu) (born February 20, 2000)
- Rina Kuriyama (栗山 莉奈, Kuriyama Rina) (born September 24, 1996)
- Kotona Masaki (正木 琴菜, Masaki Kotona) (born September 26, 1998)
- Nanaho Yabuta (籔田 奈々帆, Yabuta Nanaho) (born July 11, 2000)

* Also members of Pink Babies EX

== Discography ==
=== Singles ===
Pink Babies

- "Wanted (Shimei Tehai)" (ウォンテッド (指名手配), Uonteddo (Shimei Tehai); "Wanted (Fugitive Warrant)") (2014 July 16)
- "Le Sinbad de la plage" (2015 July 2–5; Japan Expo 2015 (Paris) exclusive)
- "Nagisa no Sindbad" (渚のシンドバッド, Nagisa no Shindobaddo; "Sindbad of the Beach") (2016 August 31)
- "UFO" (2017 February 15)

Pink Babies EX

- "Neraiuchi" (狙いうち; "Aim High") (2016 September 26)
