= List of Oricon number-one albums of 2025 =

The following is a list of Oricon number-one albums of 2025.

== Chart history ==
List of Oricon number-one albums of 2025
Issue date	Album	Artist(s)	Weekly sales	Ref.
January 6	Nantettatte AKB48	AKB48	184,764	
January 13	Hop	Stray Kids	9,940	
January 20	Strawberry Prince Forever	Sutopuri	72,997	
January 27	Gold	SixTones	422,041	
February 3	The Best 2020–2025	Snow Man	1,395,344	
February 10	Prezent	Zerobaseone	257,157	
February 17	Awake	NiziU	187,276	
February 24	Kidoairaku	Takahisa Masuda	83,040	
March 3	D.N.A	Ae! Group	247,323	
March 10	Blue Paradise	Zerobaseone	57,272	
March 17	M!x	M!lk	61,148	
March 24	A.H.O. (Audio Hang Out)	West.	183,027	
March 31	Thank You So Much	Southern All Stars	230,803	
April 7	Momentum	ROF-MAO	84,727	
April 14	Be Classic	JO1	290,262	
April 21	Ado's Best Adobum	Ado	93,540	
April 28	Red	Ryosuke Yamada	114,910	
May 5	Prot.30	Taiga Kyomoto	114,814	
May 12	Addiction	Sakurazaka46	173,392	
May 19	Why Don't You Bullet Train?	Bullet Train	153,708	
May 26	No Genre	BoyNextDoor	176,498	
June 2	Magfact	Kis-My-Ft2	308,548	
June 9	Happy Burstday	Seventeen	456,910	
June 16	Desire: Unleash	Enhypen	305,567	
June 23	Fam	Timelesz	618,940	
June 30	Hollow	Stray Kids	523,063	
July 7	The Origin	INI	400,659	
July 14	Bon Bon Voyage	Naniwa Danshi	334,417	
July 21	10	Mrs. Green Apple	760,162	
July 28	10	Mrs. Green Apple	62,543	
August 4	The Star Chapter: Together	Tomorrow X Together	304,371	
August 11	Be Alright	Ive	165,185	
August 18	Henshin	NEWS	86,933	
August 25	The Star Chapter: Together	Tomorrow X Together	35,863	
September 1	My Sparkle	Ookami Mio	15,566	
September 8	Karma	Stray Kids	145,900	
September 15	Prema	Fujii Kaze	191,767	
September 22	Raise	Koichi Domoto	85,496	
September 29	Ashes to Light	Ateez	115,428	
October 6	I Believe	Eikichi Yazawa	69,055	
October 13	Hype Vibes	CxM	102,703	
October 20	Anew	Radwimps	52,965	
October 27	Rhapsody	Jaejoong	17,237	
November 3	Starkissed	Tomorrow X Together	318,384	
November 10	Back to Life	&Team	531,508	
November 17	Onkochishin	Snow Man	1,031,312	
November 24	FYOP	B'z	178,523	
December 1	New Emotion	NiziU	174,148	
December 8	S Say	Hey! Say! JUMP	201,051	
December 15	'S Travelers	Travis Japan	148,145	
December 22	Prema	Fujii Kaze	25,393	
December 29	Magenter	IMP	58,807	

== See also ==
- List of Oricon number-one singles of 2025
