= Koinu =

Koinu may refer to:

- Koinu (producer) (born 1990), better known as Varien, American composer, producer, and multi-instrumentalist
- Rinu (born 1998), also known as Koinu, Japanese singer, voice actor, and live streamer
- Typhoon Koinu, 2023 Pacific typhoon
