= Rim (singer) =

Japanese singer

- Born: 2001 or 2002
- Organization: Kamitsubaki Studio

YouTube information
- Channel: 理芽 -RIM-
- Years active: 2019–present
- Genre: Singing
- Subscribers: 395 thousand
- Views: 175 million
- Last updated: April 14, 2026

理芽 -STRANGE GIRL CLUB-

YouTube information
- Channel: 理芽 -STRANGE GIRL CLUB-
- Years active: 2022–present
- Subscribers: 24,200
- Views: 657,172

Rim (理芽, Rime, born 2001 or 2002), stylized in all caps, is a Japanese singer and virtual YouTuber represented by Kamitsubaki Studio. She uploads original songs as well as covers in both Japanese, English, and Korean.

Her character was designed by character designer Palow, and her songs are mostly produced by singer-songwriter and vocaloid producer Mao Sasagawa.

== History ==
On October 18, 2019, in a livestream by fellow virtual singer Kaf, she announced the creation of the YouTube-based creative label Kamitsubaki Studio, as well as their record label, Kamitsubaki Records. Alongside the announcement of the label, it was announced that Rim would be making her debut that same day, while other talents Harusaruhi (春猿火) and Isekaijoucho (ヰ世界情緒) would be making their debuts at a later time. The same year, on December 20, she made her musical debut with the song You and Me (ユーエンミー).

In January 2020, she released her second song, Carnivorous Plant (食虫植物), which went viral on TikTok and currently sits at 49 million views on YouTube. Later that same year, one year after the release of her debut song, she held her first online live concert Chocolate Live on YouTube, featuring covers of J-pop and Vocaloid songs.

In March 2021, at Kaf's third one-man live Fukakai 2 Q2 (不可解弐Q2; lit. 'unexplainable 2 Q2'), the virtual artist group V.W.P (Virtual Witch Phenomenon) was formed, which featured her, alongside Kaf, Harusaruhi, Isekaijoucho, and Koko (幸祜). On May of that year, she held her first one-man live concert Neuromance and a month later, released her first album New Romancer.

In October 2022, the CeVIO AI voicebank RIME (裏命) was released, which featured Rim as the voice provider. She was also released as a text-to-speech library for Voicepeak in February 2024. The same month, she released the single Inner Child (インナアチャイルド), which was used as the opening theme for the Japanese drama adaptation of the manga series Boy's Abyss.

In 2023, she released the song Eloim (えろいむ), which was used as the theme song for the horror movie The Forbidden Play. Later that year, she released her second studio album New Romancer 2 (stylized as NEW ROMANCER2).

== Personal life ==
In July 2022, at the KAMITSUBAKI STUDIO presents Singularity Live concert, Rim announced she would be leaving Japan to study abroad in the United States for the summer. She returned in 2023.

== Discography ==
=== Studio albums ===
Title	Album details
New Romancer	Released: 20 July 2021; Label: Kamitsubaki Record; Formats: CD, digital download, streaming; Track list: 1. Pillow Talk (ピロウトーク); 2. Love Song (ラヴソング); 3. Lonely (さみしいひと, Samishii Hito); 4. Mistletoe (宿木, Yadorigi); 5. It hurts (いたいよ, Itai yo); 6. Luscious Lawless (甘美な無法); 7. Carnivorous Plant (食虫植物); 8. The Moon Not Kiss the Foetation (胎児に月はキスをしない); 9. NEUROMANCE; 10. You and Me (ユーエンミー); 11. Cry Baby (クライベイビー); 12. Magical (with Kaf) (魔的, Mateki); 13. Don't be Kind to Me (やさしくしないで, Yasashiku Naide); 14. Juuku-Gatsu (十九月)
imagine (with Guiano)	Released: 19 September 2023; Label: Anarchic Record; Formats: CD, digital download, streaming; Track list: 1. Let's Dance If We're Empty (空っぽなら、踊ろうぜ, Karapponara, Odorouze); 2. Wished to Be Beautiful as a Painting (絵画のように美しくいたかった, Kaiga no Youni Utsukushiku Itakatta); 3. Only the Unspoken Comes to Mind (言っちゃいけないことばっか浮かぶよな, Icchaikenai Kotobakka Ukabuyona); 4. The Wounds Keep Increasing, But That's Okay (傷は増え続ける、だけどそれでいい, Kizu ha Fuetsuzukeru, Dakedo Sore de ii); 5. Life Isn't a Movie (人生は映画じゃない, Jinsei ha Eiga Jyanai); 6. The Beast That Writes Lyrics (詞を書く化物, Kotoba wo Kaku Bakemono); 7. Always a Simulation in My Mind (いつもシミュレーション, Itsumo Shimurēshon); 8. Imagine, Invent (想像して、創造して, Souzoushite, Souzoushite)
New Romancer 2	Released: 5 December 2023; Label: Phenomenon Record; Formats: CD, digital download, streaming; Track list: 1. Divine Delays (おしえてかみさま, Oshiete Kamisama); 2. Sounds More Fun Than Living. (生きているより楽しそう); 3. Inner Child (インナアチャイルド); 4. from HEAVEN (with Ema) (フロム天国, Furomu Tengoku); 5. Pilgrim (ピルグリム); 6. Fanfare (ファンファーレ); 7. Refrain (with Mao Sasagawa) (ルフラン); 8. Muddy (デイネイ); 9. Poisonous (どくどく); 10. Eloim (えろいむ); 11. Fearless (with Isekaijoucho) (不的); 12. Eons Whispered (百年, Hyakunen); 13. (Not) Lunatic (狂えない)

=== Live albums ===
Title	Album details
Chocolate Live	Released: 24 March 2021; Label: Kamitsubaki Record; Formats: CD only
Chocolate Live 2	Released: 28 February 2024; Label: Phenomenon Record / Thinkr Inc.; Formats: CD, digital download, streaming
Chocolate Live 3	Released: 23 April 2025; Label: Phenomenon Record / Thinkr Inc.; Formats: CD, digital download, streaming

=== Singles ===
Title	Release date	Composer
Cry Baby (クライベイビー)	1 July 2020	Mao Sasagawa
You and Me (ユーエンミー)	22 July 2020	Mao Sasagawa
Carnivorous Plant (食虫植物, Shokuchuushokubutsu)	12 August 2020	Mao Sasagawa
Pillow Talk (ピロウトーク)	2 September 2020	Mao Sasagawa
Flowering (with Misumi)	30 September 2020	Lyrics and composition: Misumi, Arrangement: Oikawa Sosuke (及川創介)
Luscious Lawless (甘美な無法, Kambina Muhou)	28 October 2020	Mao Sasagawa (笹川真生)
Tall Story (法螺話, Houbanashi) (with Guiano)	20 January 2021	Guiano
The Moon Not Kiss The Foetation (胎児に月はキスをしない, Taiji ni Tsuki wa Kissu wo Shinai)	28 April 2021	Mao Sasagawa (笹川真生)
Juuku-Gatsu (十九月, 'Septemdecember','19 – Month') (Note: Originally named Juuku-Gatsu in 2021, it was renamed to Septemdecember in 2024. Also released as 19 – Month in certain streaming services. Sources: 理芽 – 十九月 / Juuku-Gatsu – RIM (Official Music Video) #20 – YouTube. Archived from the original on 11 June 2021.; 理芽 – 十九月 / RIM – Septemdecember (Official Music Video). 9 June 2021.; "NEW ROMANCER – Album by RIM". Apple Music.)	9 June 2021	Mao Sasagawa (笹川真生)
Pilgrim (ピルグリム)	27 April 2022	Mao Sasagawa (笹川真生)
Tick Tock Boy (チクタクボーイ)	17 August 2022	Seiichi Nagai (永井聖一)
Inner Child (インナアチャイルド)	5 October 2022	Mao Sasagawa (笹川真生)
(Not) Lunatic (狂えない, Kuruenai)	18 January 2023	Mao Sasagawa (笹川真生)
Bubble (泡沫, Utakata) (with Isekaijoucho)	1 April 2023	Ren (廉)
Fearless (不的, Suteki) (with Isekaijoucho)	26 July 2023	Mao Sasagawa (笹川真生)
Eloim (えろいむ)	23 August 2023	Mao Sasagawa (笹川真生)
Refrain (ルフラン) (with Mao Sasagawa)	1 November 2023	Mao Sasagawa (笹川真生)
Idyllic (素的, Suteki) (with Koko)	21 February 2024	Mao Sasagawa (笹川真生)
Poetical (私的, Shiteki) (with Harusaruhi)	1 May 2024	Mao Sasagawa (笹川真生)
Mutant Love (きみが大人になったんだ, Kimi ga Otonaninattanda) (with Mao Sasagawa)	16 September 2024	Mao Sasagawa (笹川真生)
The Answer of Love (アイノ最適解, Ai no Saitekikai) (with Asu)	27 November 2024	Lyrics: OHTORA, Music: OHTORA, maeshima soshi
Crave (本懐, Honkai) (with Harusaruhi)	11 December 2024	tokiwa

=== Guest appearances ===
Title	Release date	Artist
I Think of Summer (透過夏, Touka Natsu)	10 April 2020	Guiano
Magic (まほう, Mahou)	19 August 2020, 6 December 2020	Kaf
Blue, Break (あおいこわす, Aoi Kowasu) Sweet & Red (あまくてあかくて, Amaku te Akakute) Is it Pain Love or Death?	14 October 2021	Monark (video game)
Juvenile (ジュブナイル)	21 December 2021	Various Artists
Mai (舞, "Dance")	9 March 2022	Guiano
Juvenile (ジュブナイル) Luscious Lawless (甘美な無法) Sounds More Fun Than Living. (生きているより楽しそう, Ikiteiru Yori Tanoshisou) Muddy (デイネイ, Teinei) NEUROMANCE feat.裏命 (RIME) Poisonous (どくどく, Doku Doku) Carnivorous Plant (食虫植物) Mai (舞) Fanfare (ファンファーレ) Pilgrim (ピルグリム)	23 November 2022	Rim & Isekaijoucho (理芽 & ヰ世界情緒)
Carnivorous Plant (食虫植物) I Think of Summer (透過夏)	30 December 2022	Various Artists
Honeymoon (ハネムーン)	29 May 2024	Loluet
