= Mao Sasagawa =

Mao Sasagawa 笹川真生
- Also known as: Tofuya (豆腐屋); Nagisa (なぎさ); mercredi
- Born: November 25, 1995 (age 30); Kita-ku, Niigata, Niigata prefecture, Japan
- Genres: Dream pop; Post-rock; Alternative rock
- Occupations: Singer-songwriter; Vocaloid producer; Music producer; Graphic designer; Filmmaker
- Instruments: Vocals; electric guitar; bass guitar
- Years active: 2012–present
- Labels: Doused Records (2018–present); Thinkr (2023–present)
- Website: maosasagawa.jp

Mao Sasagawa (Japanese: 笹川真生, Hepburn: Sasagawa Mao) is a Japanese singer-songwriter and Vocaloid producer. He started his career releasing Vocaloid music on Nico Nico Douga under the name Tofuya (豆腐屋; lit. 'Tofu shop') at 17 years old. He switched to the name Nagisa (なぎさ) the following year. In 2017, he started releasing music under his real name (in romanization), mao sasagawa and released his first album, Graduation in 2018. Later that year, he started releasing music with his own voice, under his real name (in Kanji) and released his first major album, New Body (あたらしいからだ) in 2019. Since then, he has released two more albums, Welcome to Sunnyside (サニーサイドへようこそ) in 2023 and Strange Pop in 2025.

Alongside his own activities, he also frequently works on music for other artists, most prominently, Rim from Kamitsubaki Studio.

== Early life ==
Mao Sasagawa was born on November 25, 1995, in Kita-ku, Niigata in Niigata Prefecture. He became interested in music after listening to Ling Tosite Sigure in High school, and started producing music on the Nintendo DS app Daigasso! Band Brothers. He claims he wasn't interested in Vocaloid music at first. "To be honest, I didn't like Vocaloid at first, but then I heard a song by someone called saiB and thought, "Maybe it's not so bad," so that was my starting point."

== Career ==
Sasagawa started releasing music in 2012, at 16 years old, under the name Tofuya (豆腐屋). In August 2013, he changed to the name Nagisa (なぎさ) and released his first mini-album End-roll ha Owaranai (エンドロールは終わらない, The End-roll never ends). The CD was sold at that year's Niigata Comic Summit. He released his second mini-album, Kyoumei (共鳴, Resonance) in November.

He joined his University's light music club and remained active there. He also performed live in Niigata under the name Bungaku Shoujo (文学少女; lit. 'literary girl'). In July 2017, he changed to the name mao sasagawa and released his first single, "Hakidasu" (はきだす; "vomit"). In June 2018, he released his first studio album, Graduation. Sasagawa explained that the album's title was based on his graduation, or departure from the Vocaloid scene. Around the same year, he started producing music for other artists, such as the idol group cana÷biss. In May 2019, he released his first single with his own voice, "Mammy" / "From The New World" (ねえママ / 新世界より, Nee Mama / Shinsekai), under his real name Mao Sasagawa (笹川真生). Sasagawa was chosen for Apple Music Japan's "This week's New Artist" and in June, his next single, "Sex&Food" (官能と飽食, Kannou to Houshoku), was chosen as the first song for Spotify Japan's June 2019 Early Noise playlist. In September of the same year, he released his first major album, New Body (あたらしいからだ, Atarashii Karada). Sasagawa explained that the album's title and themes were based on the new freedom he experienced as a singer-songwriter:

"I wanted to do something new, and I wanted to be well-received by the listeners. I was blind, as if my purpose and means had been mixed up, and I was making songs chasing after someone I couldn't see. But I thought I'd stop doing that. It doesn't have to be new, I'll just do what I like... It's a common thing, but I thought, "What's the point of making something I don't like?" So this time, I just wanted to make songs I like."

In December, he wrote the song "You and Me" (ユーエンミー) for Japanese singer and virtual YouTuber Rim. Since then, he has been active as her primary composer. In August 2021, he released the single "Stranger" (異邦人, Ihoujin) and in 2022, he released his own cover version of "Carnivorous Plant" (食虫植物, Shokuchuushokubutsu). In 2023, he released his second album Welcome to Sunnyside (サニーサイドへようこそ, Sanīsaido Youkoso). The CD included three additional cover versions of his Vocaloid songs, "sasayaku" ("Whisper"), "for lust" and "Freud" (フロイデ).

In March 2025, he announced his third album, Strange Pop, which was released on April 16. It is his first release in two and a half years, and includes special appearances from virtual YouTuber Kaf, and guitarist Kimishima Ohzora. Two weeks later, he released the first single from the album, "Thus Scorched" (ですから、灼けました, Desukara, Yakemashita). He also directed the song's music video. Sasagawa described the album as an ambitious experimental work that "goes beyond hyperpop and explodes with more alternatives."

== Personal life ==
Sasagawa studied at the Niigata University of Health and Welfare, but dropped out after deciding to make a living as a music producer. He moved to Tokyo, and lived with fellow musician and former Vocaloid producer Tatsuya Kitani, who he is close friends with, until 2020.

== Artistry ==
Sasagawa works from home. For his first album, everything from lyrics, composition, arrangement, recordings and artwork was handled by himself. He uses the Digital Audio Workstation (DAW) Studio One.

He considers Shuntarō Tanikawa a massive influence in his songwriting and lyrics. His style of whispery vocals, popularized by American singer Billie Eilish, was inspired by Japanese musician TK (Toru Kitajima).

== Discography ==
=== Studio albums ===
==== As Nagisa ====
Title	Album details
Kuusousuru θ (空想するθ, "Daydreaming θ")	Released: 26 April 2014; Label: Hanage Shoujo Bungaku (Kabu) ("Fragile Literary Girl Co., Ltd."); Formats: CD only

==== As mercredi ====
Title	Album details
La vierge sale ("The dirty virgin")	Released: 30 June 2016; Label: Self-published; Formats: CD only

==== As mao sasagawa (2018–2019) ====
Title	Album details
Graduation	Released: 5 June 2018; Label: Doused Records; Formats: CD, digital download, streaming
The Season I Dreamed (生きてる方がかわいいよ, Ikiteiru Hou ga Kawaiiyo)	Released: 24 October 2018; Label: Self-published; Formats: CD, digital download, streaming
we are friends	Released: 16 February 2019; Label: Self-published; Formats: CD, digital download, streaming

==== As Mao Sasagawa (2019–present) ====
Title	Album details
New Body (あたらしいからだ, Atarashii Karada)	Released: 17 September 2019; Label: Doused Records; Formats: CD, digital download, streaming
Welcome to Sunnyside (サニーサイドへようこそ, Sanīsaido he Youkoso)	Released: 31 January 2023; Label: Thinkr; Formats: CD, digital download, streaming
Strange Pop	Released: 16 April 2025; Label: Thinkr; Formats: CD, digital download, streaming

=== EPs ===
==== As Nagisa ====
Title	Album details
End-roll ha Owaranai (エンドロールは終わらない, The End-roll never ends)	Released: 24 August 2013; Label: Self-published; Formats: CD only
Kyoumei (共鳴, Resonance)	Released: 24 November 2013; Label: Self-published; Formats: CD only

==== As mao sasagawa (2018–2019) ====
Title	Album details
kokyu	Released: 3 January 2018; Label: Self-published; Formats: Digital download only
Cerberus (ケルベロス)	Released: 10 August 2018; Label: Self-published; Formats: CD only

Notes:

- kokyu was released as a free download EP. Sasagawa says he "made it on a whim."
- Cerberus is a collaboration EP with Vocaloid producer Mel.

=== Singles ===
==== As mao sasagawa (2018–2019) ====
Title	Album details
"Darling"	Released: 15 February 2019; Label: Self-published; Formats: Digital Download, streaming

==== As Mao Sasagawa (2019–present) ====
Title	Album details
"Mammy" / "From The New World" (ねえママ / 新世界より, Nee Mama / Shinsekai)	Released: 14 May 2019; Label: Doused Records; Formats: Digital Download, streaming
"Sex&Food" / "Sea of My Bone" (官能と飽食 / わたしのほねのうみ, Kannou to Houshoku / Watashi no Hone no Umi)	Released: 4 June 2019; Label: Doused Records; Formats: Digital Download, streaming
"Carol" / "Papermoon" (キャロル / ペーパームーン)	Released: 11 July 2019; Label: Doused Records; Formats: Digital Download, streaming
"the first cry" (産声, Ubugoe)	Released: 27 March 2020; Label: Doused Records; Formats: Digital Download, streaming
"April" (エイプリル)	Released: 1 May 2020; Label: Doused Records; Formats: Digital Download, streaming
"Demon" (悪魔, Akuma)	Released: 29 May 2020; Label: Doused Records; Formats: Digital Download, streaming
"Stranger" (異邦人, Ihoujin)	Released: 18 August 2021; Label: Doused Records; Formats: Digital Download, streaming
"Japan's September Air Layer" (日本の九月の気層です, Nihon no Kugatsu no Kisou Desu)	Released: 29 September 2021; Label: Doused Records; Formats: Digital Download, streaming
"Carnivorous Plant" (食虫植物, Shokuchuushokubutsu)	Released: 25 January 2022; Label: Doused Records; Formats: Digital Download, streaming
"Hesitation / Love / Hurt" (ためらいあいいたい, Tamerai Mei Itai)	Released: 21 June 2022; Label: Doused Records; Formats: Digital Download, streaming
"Suspicious Person" (うろんなひと, Uronna Hito)	Released: 2 November 2022; Label: Doused Records; Formats: Digital Download, streaming
"Welcome to Sunnyside" (Uyama Amane Remix) (サニーサイドへようこそ (ウ山あまね Remix), Sanīsaido he Youkoso)	Released: 20 September 2023; Label: Thinkr; Formats: Digital Download, streaming
"Mutant Love" (きみが大人になったんだ, Kimi ga Otonaninattanda) (with Rim)	Released: 15 September 2024; Label: Phenomenon Record; Formats: Digital Download, streaming
"Thus Scorched" (ですから、灼けました, Desukara, Yakemashita)	Released: 18 March 2025; Label: Thinkr; Formats: Digital Download, streaming

Notes:

- English/Romanized titles obtained from Sasagawa's official YouTube channel and Apple Music.
- April is a self-cover for the song of the same name, from his 2018 Vocaloid album Graduation.
