= Hiroiki Ariyoshi =

Japanese comedian and singer

- Born: 31 May 1974 (age 52); Kumano, Aki District, Japan
- Occupations: Comedian, television presenter, singer
- Years active: 1992–present
- Agent: Ohta Production
- Spouse: Miku Natsume (m. 2021)

Notes
- Same year/generation as: Ryo Fukawa; Hitori Gekidan

Hiroiki Ariyoshi (有吉 弘行, Ariyoshi Hiroiki; born 31 May 1974) is a Japanese comedian and singer who is represented by Ohta Production.

== Saruganseki ==
Born in Kumano, Aki District, Japan, Ariyoshi formed the owarai duo Saruganseki with Kazunari Moriwaki in 1994. The pair became famous through the variety television show Susunu! Denpa Shōnen when they were made to hitchhike across Asia, a task that was covered on the show for six months. They were so popular when they returned that when they published a book about their travels, it became a best-seller. When they released a single, Shiroi kumo no yō ni, it reached number three on the Oricon charts, with the album reaching number two. They even received a new artist award at the Japan Record Awards in 1997. While for a time they were earning 20 million yen a month (about $170,000 in 1997 US dollars), their fame did not last long, and the duo broke up in 2004.

== Solo career ==
After his career went into decline, Ariyoshi's income reportedly fell to virtually nothing. However, he gradually began reappearing on television, now as a solo comedian noted for his poison tongue. His career really began to revive around 2006 when, on shows like Ametalk (hosted by Ameagari Kesshitai), he became known for giving mischievous nicknames to famous personalities. In 2009, public opinion research conducted by Oricon found that those polled considered him to be the number one "comeback" personality of the year. By 2011, he was ranked as the top television tarento in terms of number of appearances. He now hosts and have hosted several television shows, including Ariyoshi AKB Kyōwakoku with AKB48 and Matsuko & Ariyoshi Karisome Tenkoku with Matsuko Deluxe, and is a regular guest on variety shows like London Hearts.

As of September 2019, Ariyoshi has over 11 ongoing regular television programs in his name and as the MC and several other special programs.

== Personal life ==
On 2 April 2021, it was announced that Ariyoshi had married the TV announcer Miku Natsume, who was the host on Matsuko & Ariyoshi's Angry New Party.

== TV programs ==
- Matsuko & Ariyoshi's Angry New Party (2011–2017)
- Matsuko & Ariyoshi Karisome Tengoku (2017–)
- London Hearts (2011–)
- Ariyoshi-Kun no Shōjiki Sanpo (2012–)
- Ariyoshi Japon (2012–)
- Ariyoshi Seminar (2013–)
- Ariyoshi Hanseikai (2013–)
- Sakurai-Ariyoshi The Yakai (co-host with Sakurai Sho of Arashi, 2014–)
- Ariyoshi Base (2016–)
- Ariyoshiiieeeee! (2018–)
- Ariyoshi no Okane Hakken Totsugeki! Kaneo-Kun (2019–)
- Ariyoshi's Wall (2020–)
- 74th NHK Kōhaku Uta Gassen (2023)
- 75th NHK Kōhaku Uta Gassen (2024)
- 76th NHK Kōhaku Uta Gassen (2025)

== Filmography ==
=== Films ===
- Bubble Fiction: Boom or Bust (2007) – played a cameo role
- Beck (2010) – played a cameo role

=== Television drama ===
- Bengoshi no Kuzu (2006) – Shinpei Kozuka
- Unbound (2025) – Hattori Hanzō

=== Dubbing roles ===
- Ted – Ted
- Ted 2 – Ted
