= Orange Pekoe (band) =

Japanese jazz fusion duo

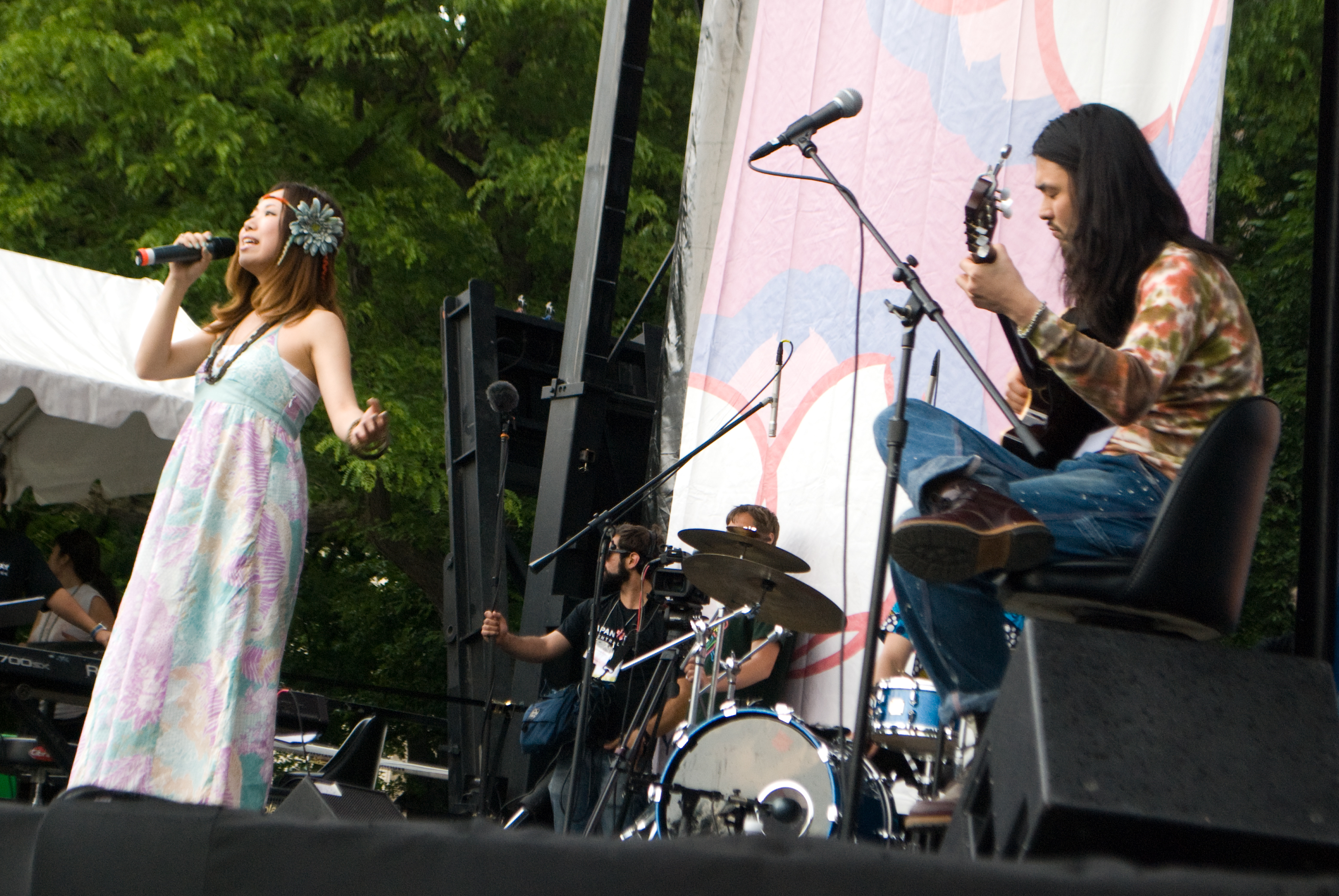
- Orange Pekoe live at Japan Day 2009 in Central Park

Background information
- Origin: Hyōgo prefecture, Japan
- Genre: Jazz fusion
- Years active: 1998–2026
- Label: BMG Japan
- Past members: Tomoko Nagashima; Kazuma Fujimoto
- Website: orange-pekoe.com

Orange Pekoe (オレンジ・ペコー, Orenji Pekō; or orange pekoe) were a Japanese jazz fusion duo that formed in 1998 and had its first major debut in 2002, with the single "Happy Valley". The band is named for orange pekoe, a grade of tea.

== Overview ==
Orange Pekoe was a band composed of vocalist Tomoko Nagashima and guitarist Kazuma Fujimoto formed in 1998. They started creating original songs and have developed a unique sound sublimating various types of music such as jazz, Latin, Brazilian and soul. Since then, Orange Pekoe has been acclaimed as a one-of-a-kind uniquely artistic band. The duo started performing in cafes and clubs in 2000, and soon gained the attention of club party organizers, DJs and artists for their highly sophisticated music. Prior to their mini album release, they released the single “Love Life” which reached number one in the independent charts of HMVs and Tower Records. Orange pekoe's first release was an eponymous mini-album “Orangepekoe” published through an independent label in April 2001.

Orange Pekoe signed with the label BMG and released the single “Happy Valley” in April 2002. The song was aired on 32 FM radio stations, and reached number one song on the Airplay Chart for 2 consecutive months. The number of the airplays they received for “Happy Valley” was a career record. They released the first BMG album “Organic Plastic Music” in May 2002, which sold over 350,000 copies and reached number five on the Japanese album chart. The album was acclaimed by critics as “the first and the finest album ever”. Orange Pekoe was awarded Japan Gold Disc Award “New Artist of the Year”, ADLIB Popular Disc Award “New National Award”, JFN Listeners Award “Best Achievement” and more.

Orange Pekoe has released seven original albums not only in Japan but also in many other countries in Asia. In 2009, they were invited to the festival in New York “Japan Day at Central Park in NYC” sponsored by Japanese Consulate General. They also performed in many festivals in other countries such as Hua Hin Jazz Festival in Thailand, JGTC Festival in Indonesia, and “ A Day Trip to Tokyo” in Taiwan. Their performance style varies from a duo to a band, sometimes playing alongside a 16 members big band style orchestra, which they received renown as one of the most unique and talented artist in Japan. In 2004, Orange Pekoe released the live performance DVD which was filmed at NHK Hall on the last day of their national live tour.

The duo have also pursued solo careers.

Kazuma is known for his unique instrumental music inspired by nature, and his works and unconventional live performances have been highly acclaimed as the representation of the whole new establishment in chamber jazz music scene in Tokyo. He has collaborated with many musicians from all over the world, including domestic artists, but especially with South American musicians such as Toninho Horta (Brazil), Flavio Venturini (Brazil), Carlos Aguirre (Argentina), Andre Mehmari (Brazil), Antonio Loureiro (Brazil), Silvia Iriondo (Argentina), and many more.

Tomoko has released her first solo album as “Nia” in 2014 from Atlantic Records (US). Her self-titled album was composed, arranged and produced by Takuya Kuroda who released his album from Blue Note Records. Nia's first album was recorded at the Bunker Studios in NYC.

== Discography ==
=== Singles ===
1. "Taiyō no Kakera" (太陽のかけら; Released August 23, 2001)
2. "Yawarakana Yoru" (やわらかな夜; February 27, 2002)
3. "Happy Valley" (April 24, 2002)
4. "Honeysuckle" (July 24, 2002)
5. "Beautiful Thing" (November 6, 2002)
6. "Gokurakuchō ~Bird of Paradise~" (極楽鳥 ～Bird of Paradise～; May 21, 2003)
7. "Songbird" (ソングバード; May 26, 2004)
8. "Koganeiro no Hane" (黄金色の羽根; June 29, 2005)
9. "Sora no Niwa" (空の庭; October 12, 2005)
10. "Kirakira" (キラキラ; September 5, 2007)
11. "Marigold/Crystarhythm" (マリーゴールド/クリスタリズム; May 27, 2009)

=== Albums ===
==== Full albums ====
1. Organic Plastic Music (May 22, 2002)
2. Modern Lights (July 2, 2003)
3. Poetic Ore; Invisible Beautiful Realism (July 7, 2004)
4. Live2004 (February 23, 2005)
5. Grace (December 14, 2005)
6. Best Remixes(& Clips) (November 22, 2006)
7. Wild Flowers (November 21, 2007)
8. 10th Anniversary Best Album SUN & MOON(November 12, 2008)
9. Crystalismo (July 8, 2009)
10. Oriental Jazz Mode (October 23, 2013)
11. orange pekoe with the Big Band Party Night!!! (December 24, 2014)

==== Mini-albums ====
1. orangepekoe (April 20, 2001)
2. orangepekoe in autumn (November 4, 2004)

=== DVDs ===
1. Live from Poetic Ore Tour (July 29, 2005)
