= Festive (group) =

Japanese idol girl group

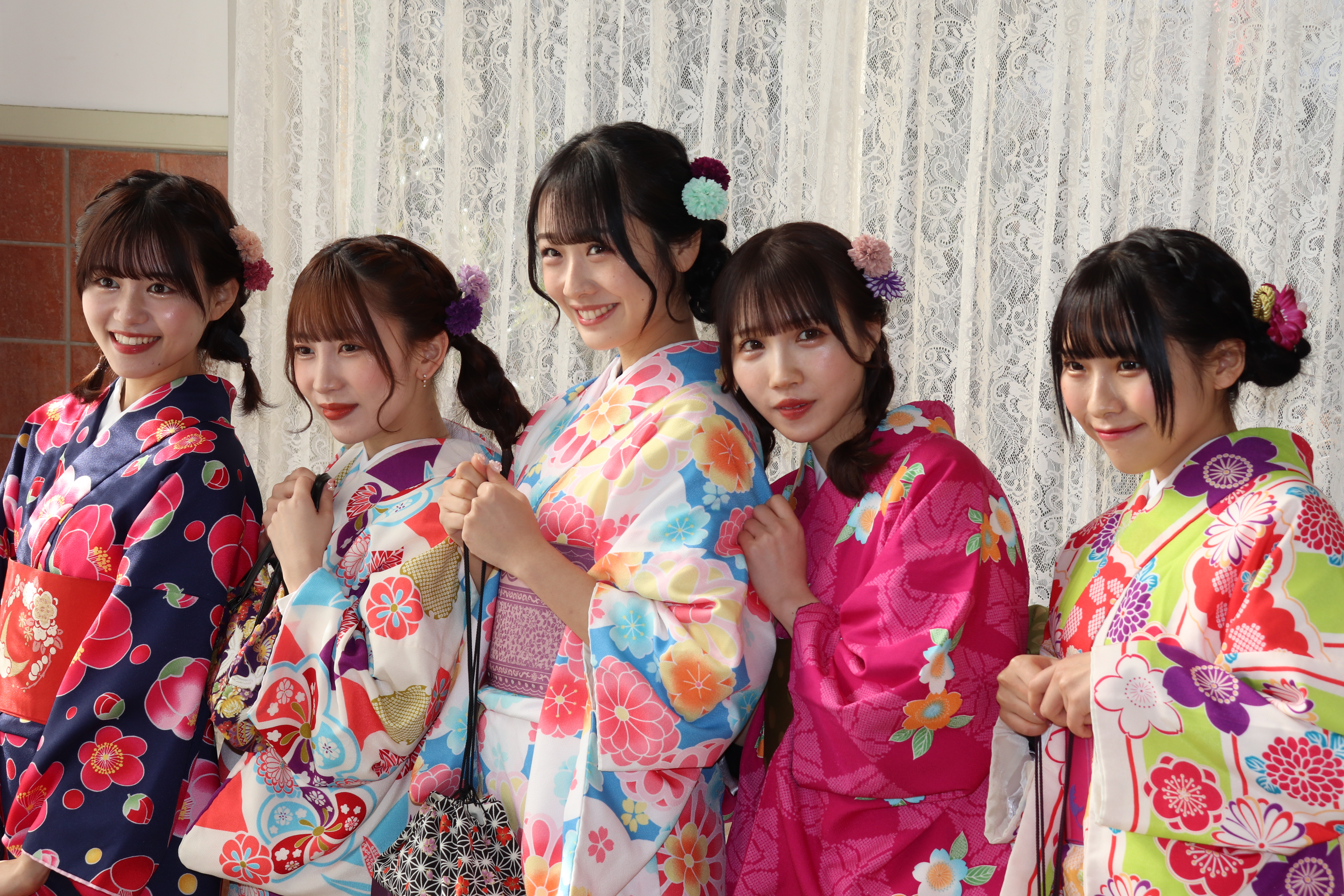
- Festive in 2023

Background information
- Origin: Japan
- Genres: J-pop
- Years active: 2013–present
- Labels: Rize Production
- Members: Hinata Yagi; Koharu Tsuji; Shiori Honda; Riona Yoda; Maaya Nishina; Nanami Hoshino; Airi Koshiba; Ai Nanase
- Past members: see Former members
- Website: fstv.rizepro.net

Festive (フェスティブ); stylized as FES☆TIVE, is a Japanese idol girl group that formed in 2013.

== History ==
Festive was formed on March 27, 2013. Mai Hinata left on April 8. Yuma Sugano graduated on November 24.

Momoka Fujimura left on January 20, 2014. Kotone Suzuki joined the group on February 23. Ami Sakai graduated on March 22. Akari Shīna and Hiyo Momohara joined the group on June 18.

Festive made their major label debut on May 13, 2015, with the single "Omatsuri Hero". Their second single, "Kingyo no Kin-chan", was released on November 25.

They released their third single, "Susume Zipang", on March 16, 2016. Their debut album, Wasshoi Record, was released on July 27.

Honami Yokoi and Akari Shīna graduated on January 12, 2017. Piano Shiraishi and Saria Takeuchi joined the group on January 19, 2017. They released their fourth single, "Disco Rettō Ukiyo no Yume", om February 22. Their fifth single, "Go To Fes", was released on July 26, followed by their sixth single, "Oidemase!! Gokuraku", on November 29.

Mitsuki Suzuki, Kotone Suzuki and Yuna Sakamoto graduated on March 25, 2018. Ruriko Dokō, Saeko Kondo and Marika Minami joined the group on April 1. They released their seventh single, "Yamato Nadeshiko Sunrise", on May 23. Hiyo Momohara and Reia Shiozaki left on May 31.

They released two singles in 2019: their eighth single, "Yura Yura Yurari Koigokoro", on January 16, 2019, and their ninth single, "Haretoke! Appare! Japanese!", on September 25. Piano Shiraishi left in December.

Their tenth single, "Shakariki Top Runner!", was released on February 26, 2020. Hinata Yagi joined the group on May 24. They released their eleventh single, "Shinpaku Day Dream", on September 30. Saeko Kondo graduated on November 14.

Yuria Takaki joined the group on January 4, 2021, followed by Ion Onodera and Yua Midorikawa on January 10. Their twelfth single, "Jinrui! We are Oneness!", was released on April 28. Ion Onodera and Yua Midorikawa graduated on August 31. Saria Takeuchi graduated on September 29. On November 24, they released their thirteenth single, "Shin Kiteretsu Monogatari".

Their fourteenth single, "Bishō no Kuni", was released on May 25, 2022. Marika Minami graduated on August 31. Koharu Tsuji joined the group on September 11.

They released their fifteenth single, "Nihon Bare Densetsu", was released on January 11, 2023. Shiori Honda joined the group on May 29. They released their sixteenth single, "Human Nature World", on August 2.

Their seventeenth single, "Cosmic Matsuri Daikakumei", was released on January 24, 2024. Riona Yoda joined the group on February 23. Yuria Takaki graduated on March 20. On July 9, their eighteenth single, the double A-side single "Girly Chu / Fortune Rush", was released. Maaya Nishina joined the group on August 2. Hinari Aoba graduated on October 18.

They released their nineteenth single, "#SutekinaSolaseed", on February 26, 2025. Ruriko Dokō graduated on April 21. On April 24, Nanami Hoshino, Airi Koshiba and Ai Nanase joined the group.

== Members ==
=== Current ===
- Hinata Yagi (八木ひなた)
- Koharu Tsuji (辻こはる)
- Shiori Honda (本多しおり)
- Riona Yoda (与田理央那)
- Maaya Nishina (仁科茉彩)
- Nanami Hoshino (星乃ななみ)
- Airi Koshiba (小柴あいり)
- Ai Nanase (七瀬あい)

=== Former ===
- Mai Hinata (日向真衣)
- Yuma Sugano (菅野由真)
- Momoka Fujimura (藤村萌々花)
- Ami Sakai (堺愛海)
- Honami Yokoi (横井ほなみ)
- Akari Shīna (椎名あかり)
- Mitsuki Suzuki (鈴木みつき)
- Kotone Suzuki (鈴木ことね)
- Yuna Sakamoto (坂元由奈)
- Hiyo Momohara (桃原ひよ)
- Reia Shiozaki (汐咲玲亜)
- Piano Shiraishi (白石ぴあの)
- Saeko Kondo (近藤沙瑛子)
- Ion Onodera (小野寺偉音)
- Yua Midorikawa (緑川優愛)
- Saria Takeuchi (竹内さりあ)
- Marika Minami (南茉莉花)
- Yuria Takaki (髙木ゆりあ)
- Hinari Aoba (青葉ひなり)
- Ruriko Dokō (土光瑠璃子)

== Discography ==
=== Studio albums ===
List of studio albums, with selected details and chart positions
Title	Details	Peak chart positions	
Title	Details	JPN	JPN Hot
Wasshoi Record (ワッショイレコード)	Released: July 27, 2016; Label: Tokuma Japan Communications; Formats: CD, digital download, streaming	21	77

=== Singles ===
List of singles, with selected chart positions, showing year released and album name
Title	Year	Peak chart positions		Album
Title	Year	JPN	JPN Hot	Album
"Omatsuri Hero" (お祭りヒーロー)	2015	24	—	Wasshoi Record
"Kingyo no Kin-chan" (金魚のきんちゃん)	2015	20	81	Wasshoi Record
"Susume Zipang" (進めジパング)	2016	10	90	Wasshoi Record
"Disco Rettō Ukiyo no Yume" (ディスコ列島浮世の夢)	2017	24	—	Non-album singles
"Go To Fes" (ゴートゥーフェス☆)	2017	15	—	Non-album singles
"Oidemase!! Gokuraku" (Oidemase!!～極楽～)	2017	20	—	Non-album singles
"Yamato Nadeshiko Sunrise" (大和撫子サンライズ)	2018	10	50	Non-album singles
"Yura Yura Yurari Koigokoro" (ゆらゆらゆらり恋心)	2019	5	33	Non-album singles
"Haretoke! Appare! Japanese!" (ハレとケ!あっぱれ!ジャパニーズ!)	2019	8	—	Non-album singles
"Shakariki Top Runner!" (しゃかりきトップランナー!)	2020	8	58	Non-album singles
"Shinpaku Day Dream" (心拍白昼夢(シンパクデイドリーム))	2020	9	—	Non-album singles
"Jinrui! We are Oneness!" (人類! We are Oneness!)	2021	10	—	Non-album singles
"Shin Kiteretsu Monogatari" (新・奇天烈物語)	2021	14	—	Non-album singles
"Bishō no Kuni" (微笑ノ国)	2022	5	—	Non-album singles
"Nihon Bare Densetsu" (ニホンバレデンセツ)	2023	4	—	Non-album singles
"Human Nature World"	2023	5	97	Non-album singles
"Cosmic Matsuri Daikakumei" (コズミック祭大革命)	2024	4	87	Non-album singles
"Girly Chu / Fortune Rush" (がーりっちゅ / フォーチュンラッシュ)	2024	5	—	Non-album singles
"#SutekinaSolaseed" (#素敵なソラシド)	2025	12	—	Non-album singles
"—" denotes a recording that did not chart or was not released in that territory.
