= Strawberry Prince Forever =

Greatest hits album by Strawberry Prince
- Released: January 8, 2025
- Genre: J-pop
- Length: 310:40
- Label: STPR Records

Strawberry Prince chronology
Rainbow-Colored History (2023)	Strawberry Prince Forever (2025)

Strawberry Prince Forever is the first greatest hits album by Japanese boy band Strawberry Prince. It was released on January 8, 2025 by their independent label, STPR Records.

== Background ==
"Strawberry Prince Forever" is Strawberry Prince's first compilation album.

In addition to 4 CDs containing 84 songs selected by voting, it was released in three formats: a Strawberry Prince limited edition in a record-sized box with a Blu-ray containing 20 performance videos, a story video of a date to a theme park with Strawberry Prince, and a lyric booklet (48 pages) containing unreleased live photos, a first-run limited edition in a box with the same Blu-ray as the Strawberry Prince limited edition and a lyric booklet (88 pages), and a regular edition in a sleeve case with a lyric booklet (100 pages).

To commemorate the release of this work, a handshake event was held in which those who purchased the album could win a lottery, and a live concert to commemorate the release of this work, "Strawberry Memory Vol. Forever!! "Strawberry Prince Best Album Release Party 2025"" was held at Saitama Super Arena from January 11 to 12.

== Sales ==
"Strawberry Prince Forever" ranked first in the "Oricon Daily Album Ranking" on January 7, 2025, first in the "Oricon Weekly Album Ranking" on January 20, 2025, and first in the Billboard Japan Top Albums Sales on January 15, 2025.

== Track listing ==
Disc 1
No.	Title	Length
1.	"Strawberry Prince Forever"	3:34
2.	"Streamer"	4:15
3.	"Suki Suki Seijin"	3:56
4.	"Strawberry ☆ Planet!"	3:46
5.	"Gingira Ginga"	3:19
6.	"Very Very Love"	3:33
7.	"Strawberry Kiss"	3:28
8.	"Seishun Chocolate"	3:17
9.	"Ichigo-iro Natsu Hanabi"	3:46
10.	"Palette Dance"	4:05
11.	"Strawberry Happy" (instrumental)	0:37
12.	"Mabushigariya"	3:58
13.	"Feel Free!"	4:16
14.	"Jumper!"	3:00
15.	"Parade wa Kokosa"	3:42
16.	"Hurry Hurry Love"	4:31
17.	"Prince"	4:05
18.	"Propose"	4:39
19.	"Daisuki ni Nareba Iin Janai?"	5:05
20.	"Okaeri Love!"	3:43
21.	"Dreaming Parade"	4:13
Total length:		78:58

Disc 2
No.	Title	Length
1.	"Chikai no Hanataba o (With You)"	3:37
2.	"SutoPuri no Limit Sengen! Strawberry Prince NO LIMIT"	0:58
3.	"Hull Train"	3:47
4.	"Chikoku Shite mo Ii Jan"	3:01
5.	"Amore Mio"	4:41
6.	"Sakasete Koi no 1・2・3!"	4:18
7.	"Strawberry Sweet" (instrumental)	0:46
8.	"Yurayura"	3:54
9.	"Enkyori Cry"	4:14
10.	"Pure Pure Ichigo"	3:07
11.	"Chocolate Hanbunko"	3:40
12.	"Valentine Day Kimi o Hanasanai!"	4:00
13.	"Kibō no Chū Shiyō"	3:49
14.	"Umareta Sono Toki kara" (Gekijō-ban SutoPuri version)	1:57
15.	"Inu-kei Danshi Rusuban-chū"	3:56
16.	"Ohime-sama ni Natte Ii yo"	3:44
17.	"Christmas Love"	3:32
18.	"Suki de Ite Kurete Ii yo"	3:44
19.	"Suki ni Natte Ii yo ne?"	3:56
20.	"Saishū Ressha"	4:46
21.	"Uten Kekkō"	3:43
Total length:		73:01

Disc 3
No.	Title	Length
1.	"Here We Go!!"	3:20
2.	"Are You Ready?"	1:55
3.	"Bokura Dake no Shangri-La"	3:59
4.	"Move On!"	3:49
5.	"AquaKiss"	4:18
6.	"Go Go Crazy"	3:37
7.	"Next Stage!!"	4:48
8.	"Stay Proud"	4:51
9.	"Strike the Prison!!"	4:11
10.	"Syndrome Love"	3:25
11.	"Strawberry Enjoy Party" (instrumental)	0:48
12.	"Yosakoi Disco Party"	3:35
13.	"Panpi Janai no yo!"	3:48
14.	"159%"	3:00
15.	"Shinobi Koi"	4:14
16.	"Dramatic no Anti"	4:06
17.	"Literacy"	5:03
18.	"Shukumei"	3:18
19.	"Ride on Time"	2:50
20.	"Aimai"	3:41
21.	"Again"	4:04
Total length:		76:50

Disc 4
No.	Title	Length
1.	"Niji no Hajimari"	3:35
2.	"Hikari Yume"	5:46
3.	"Anniversary"	3:54
4.	"Tenshi ni Kuchizuke"	3:44
5.	"Kūsō Electica"	3:34
6.	"Tsuraiya-iya"	2:22
7.	"Tarareba"	3:43
8.	"Namidame"	4:00
9.	"Mukō e"	4:08
10.	"Te o Tsunaide Arukō" (orchestra version)	3:38
11.	"Strawberry Love" (instrumental)	0:31
12.	"Koi no Yukue"	3:47
13.	"33414"	3:38
14.	"Stars and Prayers"	3:57
15.	"Soba ni Iru kara"	5:09
16.	"San-gatsu no Orange"	3:58
17.	"Asa no Yūhi"	5:59
18.	"Flowering Palettes"	4:09
19.	"Spreading Palettes"	4:24
20.	"Believe"	4:01
21.	"Strawberry Prince Forever" (orchestra version)	3:43
Total length:		81:51 5:10:40

== Weekly charts ==
Weekly chart performance for Strawberry Prince Forever
Chart (2025)	Peak position
Japanese Albums (Oricon)	1
Japanese Combined Albums (Oricon)	1

== Certifications ==
Certifications for Strawberry Prince Forever
Region	Certification	Certified units/sales
Japan (RIAJ) Physical	Gold	100,000^{^}
^{^} Shipments figures based on certification alone.
