= Jel (singer) =

- Born: July 28, 1996 (age 29); Osaka, Japan
- Genres: J-pop
- Instrument: Vocals
- Years active: 2016–present
- Label: STPR Records
- Member of: Strawberry Prince

Jel (ジェル, Jeru; born July 28, 1996) is a Japanese singer and live streamer. He is a member of the J-pop group Strawberry Prince.

== Biography ==
Jel was recruited by Nanamori to join Strawberry Prince in mid-2016. On February 24, 2021, he released his first solo album, Believe. It placed third on the Oricon weekly album ranking and second on the Oricon daily album ranking.

In August 2022, Jel announced that he would be going on hiatus following a concert later that month due to depression. He returned to Strawberry Prince on January 27, 2024.

== Tōi-san series ==
On April 10, 2019, Jel uploaded a Twitter video dubbed as an "otome game with too much tsukkomi" that would contribute to his popularity. The 45-second video shows a character sprite of Jel asking the name of the female protagonist (also voiced by him). Standing too far, the protagonist keeps yelling "you're too far!" (遠い！, tōi!), which Jel misunderstands as her saying that her name is Tōi (遠井). The series has spawned over 1,000 videos, a light novel, a middle school textbook, a manga series, and an upcoming anime film titled Tōi-san wa Seishun Shitai! Baka to Smartphone to Romance to (遠井さんは青春したい！『バカとスマホとロマンスと』).

== Discography ==
=== Albums ===
Title	Album details	Peak position
Title	Album details	JPN
Believe	Released: February 24, 2021; Label: STPR Records; Formats: CD, CD+DVD, digital download; Track listing: 1. "Kuro no Utopia"; 2. "Kyo"; 3. "Anata ni Tsugeru Hajimari no Oto"; 4. "Wheel of Fortune"; 5. "Kūsō Electica"; 6. "Wanderer"; 7. "Monopolize"; 8. "Yozakura Hikō"; 9. "Warui Hito"; 10. "Teito Gunjō" (Believe ver.); 11. "Poker Dance"; 12. "S-cort"; 13. "Always" (Believe ver.); 14. "Jump and Fly"; 15. "Believe"	3

=== Singles ===
Title	Year
"Jump and Fly"	2019
"Teito Gunjō"	2020
"Sharuru"	2020
"Shiwa"	2021
"Tōi Mirai made Koi o Shite"	2023
"Umareta Sono Toki kara"	2024
"Hoshi no Nai Yoru wa"	2024
"Metcha Tōi!"	2025

== Filmography ==
=== Film ===
Year	Title	Role	Source
2024	Gekijōban SutoPuri Hajimari no Monogatari: Strawberry School Festival!!!!	Himself	

=== Anime ===
Year	Title	Role	Source
2020–2021	Yo-kai Watch Jam – Yo-kai Academy Y: Close Encounters of the N Kind	Haruki Hirono	
