= Root (singer) =

- Born: October 25, 1998 (age 27); Tochigi Prefecture, Japan
- Genres: J-pop
- Instrument: Vocals
- Years active: 2015–present
- Labels: STPR Records
- Member of: Strawberry Prince

Root (るぅと, Rūto; born October 25, 1998) is a Japanese singer and live streamer. He is a member of the J-pop group Strawberry Prince.

== Biography ==
Root was recruited by Nanamori to join Strawberry Prince in mid-2016. On October 30, 2019, he released his first solo album, Kimi to Boku no Himitsu Kichi (君と僕の秘密基地), as well as a mini-album, Kimi to Boku no Story (君と僕のストーリー). Kimi to Boku no Himitsu Kichi sold over 30,000 copies on its release day and placed fourth in the Oricon weekly album ranking, while Kimi to Boku no Story placed twelfth on the Oricon weekly album ranking.

From 2018 to 2019, Root played the character of Kippei Nemuri in HoneyWorks's fictional idol unit "Dolce" (ドルチェ). He recorded one album with the group before it disbanded.

Root's music has been featured in other media. The song "Garakuta Reboot" was used as the ending theme for the movie Fukkō Ōen Masamune Datenicle Gattai-ban+, and the song "Wasure Ai" was used as background music in Lawson and Family Mart stores throughout Japan.

== Discography ==
=== Albums ===
Title	Album details	Peak position
Title	Album details	JPN
Kimi to Boku no Himitsu Kichi	Released: October 30, 2019; Label: STPR Records; Formats: CD, CD+DVD, digital download; Track listing: 1. "Kimi wa Itsumo 100-ten Manten!"; 2. "Heroine to Seito B"; 3. "Ike! Bokura no School Front!"; 4. "Justified"; 5. "&you" 6. "Citrus Fruits"; 7. "Haikei, Fubyōdō no Kami-sama e" 8. "Jū San-nen Suisei"; 9. "Kono Omoi o Uta ni" 10. "Compass"; 11. "Clover"; 12. "Ano Natsu ni Hi o Tsukete"; 13. "Good Day"; 14. "Kimi to Boku no Himitsu Kichi"; 15. "Spreading Palette"	4
Kimi to Boku no Yakusoku	Released: January 28, 2026; Label: STPR Records; Formats: CD, digital download	3

=== Mini-albums ===
Title	Album details	Peak position
Title	Album details	JPN
Kimi to Boku no Story	Released: October 30, 2019; Label: STPR Records; Formats: CD, digital download; Track listing: 1. "Kinō no Boku to Sayōnara"; 2. "Pull the Trigger"; 3. "Kyō mo Sora ga Mabushii kara" 4. "Chikoku Shite mo Ii Jan"; 5. "Kimi to Boku no Story"; 6. "Flowering Palettes"	12

=== Extended plays ===
Title	EP details
Boku wa Ame ni Nureta	Released: August 17, 2020; Label: STPR Records; Formats: Digital download; Track listing: 1. "Jester"; 2. "Yozakura Hikō"; 3. "ID"; 4. "Fushin"; 5. "Boku wa Ame ni Nureta"
Wasure Ai	Released: August 14, 2021; Label: STPR Records; Formats: Digital download; Track listing: 1. "Chromato"; 2. "Trickster"; 3. "N.E."; 4. "Yoru no Arukikata"; 5. "Wasure Ai"

=== Singles ===
Title	Year
"Booo!"	2020
"Garakuta Reboot"	2021
"Kimi to Boku no Story – Birthday Ver."	2021
"Arifureta Hibi to, Arifurenai Kimi to."	2022
"Nee yo na"	2022
"Wonder Finder!"	2022
"Dō Shiyō mo Naku"	2022
"Ikiru Hanashi"	2023
"Netsu to Hakuchūmu"	2023
"Kidoairaku"	2023
"Kimiloss"	2023
"Sono Koe no Aizu ga"	2024
"Umareta Sono Toki kara"	2024
"Uso de Gomenne"	2024
"Zutto Boku wa"	2024
"Kōkai Nisshi"	2024
"Tōmei na Tsubasa"	2024
"Big Love You"	2025
"Shigatsu o Kazoete"	2025
"First Step"	2025
"First Step (TV Size)"	2025

== Filmography ==
=== Film ===
Year	Title	Role	Source
2024	Gekijōban SutoPuri Hajimari no Monogatari: Strawberry School Festival!!!!	Himself	

=== Video games ===
Year	Title	Role	Source
2020	HoneyWorks Premium Live	Kippei Nemuri	
