= Rinu =

- Also known as: Koinu
- Born: 24 May 1998 (age 28); Tokyo, Japan
- Genres: J-pop
- Occupations: Singer; voice actor; live streamer
- Instrument: Vocals
- Years active: 2015–present
- Label: STPR Records
- Member of: Strawberry Prince

Rinu (莉犬, Riinu; born 24 May 1998) is a Japanese singer, voice actor, and live streamer. He is a member of the J-pop group Strawberry Prince.

== Biography ==
Rinu was born on 24 May 1998 in Tokyo, Japan. As a child, his family was constantly in debt, and he had a poor relationship with his parents. One of his childhood friends died from cancer in junior high school; he decided to become a voice actor because this friend's dream was to be a voice actor. He became interested in utaite to impress a classmate in whom he had a romantic interest, and began uploading his own song covers to Nico Nico Douga in late 2015. In mid-2016, he was recruited by Nanamori to join Strawberry Prince. He also collaborates with fellow STPR Records artists Vau of KnightX and Tigusakun of Amptak x Colors under the name Anipani (Japanese: あにぱに). Anipani performed the theme song for the anime movie Kaitō Queen no Yūga na Kyūka.

From 2018 to 2019, Rinu played the character of Fūma Shirayuki in HoneyWorks's fictional idol unit "Dolce" (Japanese: ドルチェ). He recorded one album with the group before it disbanded.

On 11 December 2019, Rinu released his first full solo album, Time Capsule (Japanese: タイムカプセル). It placed second on the Oricon weekly album ranking, and first on the Oricon daily album ranking. Additionally, the song "Ruma" from the album placed ninth on the Oricon YouTube chart. His second solo album, Shutter Chance! (Japanese: シャッターチャンス！), released on 12 January 2022 and placed second on the Oricon weekly album ranking, and first on the Oricon daily album ranking. His third solo album, Kotonoha Wonderland (Japanese: 言ノ葉ワンダーランド), released on 13 August 2025 and placed third on the Oricon weekly album ranking.

On 24 May 2021, Rinu released an official fanbook, Rinu Memory. The book sold 56,000 copies its first week, and ranked first on the Oricon weekly book ranking.

As a voice actor, Rinu often goes by the name Koinu (Japanese: こいぬ).

Rinu came out as transgender in 2017. He underwent gender-affirming surgery in October 2022.

== Discography ==
=== Albums ===
Title	Year	Album details	Peak position	Certifications
Title	Year	Album details	JPN	Certifications
Time Capsule	2019	Released: 11 December 2019; Label: STPR Records; Formats: CD, CD+DVD, digital download; Track listing: 1. "Yoku Dekimashita ◎"; 2. "Y Gakuen e Ikō Gakuen Dotabata-hen"; 3. "Koi no Tsubomi"; 4. "Ruma"; 5. "Negarhythm"; 6. "Tweet Tweet"; 7. "Happy Angle"; 8. "Rainbow"; 9. "Since 1998."; 10. "Now or Never"; 11. "Kimi no Hō ga Suki Dakedo"; 12. "Nostalgia no Madobe"; 13. "Saishū Ressha"; 14. "Time Capsule"	2	RIAJ: Gold
Shutter Chance!	2022	Released: 12 January 2022; Label: STPR Records; Formats: CD, CD+DVD, digital download; Track listing: 1. "Jinsei Shōri Sengen!"; 2. "Waon"; 3. "Manmaru Dance"; 4. "Aoi Oetsu o Mō Ichi-do"; 5. "Kōratto"; 6. "Ōkami"; 7. "Cute★Aggression"; 8. "Raripappa☆Shugi"; 9. "Iindayo"; 10. "Love Hero"; 11. "Gimme・Gimme・Kimi!"; 12. "Story"; 13. "Shutter Chance!"	2	RIAJ: Gold
Kotonoha Wonderland	2025	Released: 13 August 2025; Label: STPR Records; Formats: CD, digital download; Track listing Disc 1: 1. "Kotonohanataba"; 2. "Henshin!"; 3. "Matafutamata"; 4. "Reverseday"; 5. "Magical Case!"; 6. "Sukisugi Chūihō♡"; 7. "Saikyō ☆ Sai Oshi Sensation!!"; 8. "Wan for All!"; 9. "Wannu"; 10. "Nai Kotoba"; 11. "Who's Your Prince?"; 12. "Heroine♡Killer"; 13. "Sweetheart"; 14. "Koi o Shitta Hibi ni" 15. "Hikari"; 16. "First Bite"; 17. "Kizuna"; 18. "Love Koi Keihō"; 19. "End Roll no Sono Saki e"; Disc 2: 1. "Midnight Tempo"; 2. "Odd-Eye Love"; 3. "Kenkō-teki na Romance o Chōdai"; 4. "You&me"; 5. "Itazura-gokko"; 6. "Utsuro"; 7. "Repezen=Underdog"; 8. "8-gatsu 5840-nichi" 9. "Metamorphosis"; 10. "Anubis"; 11. "Yondaran!"	3	

=== Singles ===
Title	Year
"Kimi no Hō ga Suki Dakedo"	2019
"Jinsei Shōri Sengen!"	2020
"Ojama Mushi"	2020
"Iindayo"	2021
"Kiseki"	2021
"Secret Base (Kimi ga Kureta Mono)"	2021
"Amanojaku"	2022
"Suki Suki Seijin"	2022
"Ren'ai Circulation"	2022
"Magical Case!"	2022
"Summertime Record"	2022
"Sukisugi Chūihō♡"	2023
"Matafutamata"	2023
"Midnight Tempo"	2023
"Kizuna"	2023
"Hikari"	2023
"Wan for All!"	2023
"Kenkō-teki na Romance o Chōdai"	2023
"You&me"	2023
"Itazura-gokko"	2024
"Utsuro"	2024
"Wannu"	2024
"Nai Kotoba"	2024
"Umareta Sono Toki kara"	2024
"End Roll no Sono Saki e"	2024
"Repezen=Underdog"	2024
"Sweetheart"	2024
"8-gatsu 5840-nichi"	2024
"Aye, Aye, Sir!"	2024
"Odd-Eye Love"	2024
"Henshin!"	2024
"Henshin! (TV Size)"	2024
"Saikyō ☆ Sai Oshi Sensation!!"	2024
"First Bite"	2024
"Metamorphosis"	2025
"Anubis"	2025
"Naichatte Ii Jan"	2025
"Koi no Sankaku Kankei-chi"	2025
"Queen's Illusion"	2025
"Reverseday"	2025

== Filmography ==
=== Film ===
Year	Title	Role	Source
2024	Gekijōban SutoPuri Hajimari no Monogatari: Strawberry School Festival!!!!	Himself	

=== Anime ===
Year	Title	Role	Notes	Source
2017	Our love has always been 10 centimeters apart	Haruki Serizawa (Childhood)	Credited as Koinu	
2018–2021	Kiratto Pri Chan	Shunta Moegi	Credited as Koinu	
2018	Hashiri Tsuzukete Yokattatte	Shiori Gushiken	Credited as Koinu	
2020–2021	Yo-kai Watch Jam – Yo-kai Academy Y: Close Encounters of the N Kind	Chiaki Hebiyama, Sky Snaker		
2023	Cardfight!! Vanguard will+Dress	Reno Akai		

=== Video games ===
Year	Title	Role	Source
2020	Yo-kai Watch: Wibble Wobble	Sky Snaker	
2020	Yo-kai Watch Jam: Yo-kai Academy Y – Waiwai Gakuen Seikatsu	Chiaki Hebiyama, Sky Snaker	
2020	Yo-kai Sangokushi: Kunitori Wars	Sky Snaker	
2020	HoneyWorks Premium Live	Fūma Shirayuki	
