= Colon (singer) =

Japanese singer and live streamer

- Born: May 29, 1996 (age 29); Saitama Prefecture, Japan
- Genres: J-pop
- Instrument: Vocals
- Years active: 2016–present
- Labels: STPR Records
- Member of: Strawberry Prince

Colon (ころん, Koron; born May 29, 1996) is a Japanese singer and live streamer. He is a member of the J-pop group Strawberry Prince.

== Biography ==
Colon was recruited by Nanamori to join Strawberry Prince in mid-2016. On January 27, 2021, he released his first solo album, Aster (Japanese: アスター). The album sold 94,000 copies in its debut week and placed first in the Oricon weekly album ranking.

Colon runs a gaming channel on YouTube. He was the most tweeted-about gaming personality in the world in the first half of 2021.

== Discography ==
=== Albums ===
Title	Album details	Peak position	Certifications
Title	Album details	JPN	Certifications
Aster	Released: January 27, 2021; Label: STPR Records; Formats: CD, CD+DVD, digital download; Track listing: 1. "Aster"; 2. "Mad Hat Rabbit"; 3. "Koi no Inryoku de" 4. "404"; 5. "Lazy Crazy"; 6. "××Technique"; 7. "Kyun Desu Kyun Desu"; 8. "Cosmic Mose"; 9. "Daiyogen"; 10. "Haiboku no Mirai Chizu"; 11. "Monopolize"; 12. "Koi wa Just in Me"; 13. "Panpi Janai no yo!!" 14. "Haiboku Hero"	1	RIAJ: Gold
Sorairo End Roll (空色エンドロール)	Released: December 17, 2025; Label: STPR Records; Formats: CD, CD+DVD, digital download	4	

=== Singles ===
Title	Year
"Haiboku Hero"	2019
"Daiyogen"	2020
"Haiboku no Mirai Chizu"	2020
"Code (Angō Kaidoku)"	2020
"Monopolize"	2020
"Android Girl"	2020
"Haiboku Hero – Piano Ver."	2021
"Yo mo Sugara Kimi Omou"	2021
"Positive Blue"	2023
"Tsuki wa Kirei na no ni"	2023
"Umareta Sono Toki kara"	2024
"Shōri no Hero"	2024
"Symphonia"	2024
"Kanjō Risemarando"	2025

== Filmography ==
=== Film ===
Year	Title	Role	Source
2024	Gekijōban SutoPuri Hajimari no Monogatari: Strawberry School Festival!!!!	Himself	
