= Strawberry Prince =

Japanese musical group

Strawberry Prince すとぷり
- Origin: Japan
- Genres: J-pop; anison
- Years active: 2016–present
- Label: STPR Records
- Members: Jel; Colon; Rinu; Root
- Past members: Nanamori; Satomi
- Website: strawberryprince.com

Strawberry Prince (Japanese: すとぷり, Hepburn: SutoPuri) is a Japanese boy band formed in June 2016. The group consists of four members: Jel (ジェル), Colon (ころん), Rinu (莉犬くん), and Root (るぅと). Each member is represented by an illustrated character when appearing in media.

== History ==
Strawberry Prince was founded by Nanamori, the group's leader, on June 4, 2016. Nanamori had gained popularity on Nico Nico Douga as an utaite, and he contacted other popular users to form a group. The members use stage names and illustrated avatars to represent themselves, never showing their real faces except at live performances and meet-and-greets. Nanamori thought that it was too dangerous to post his face on the internet when he first started posting videos, and he decided to keep the gimmick after forming the group. In addition to music, the members also upload talkshows, video game playthroughs, and humorous videos to their YouTube channel.

While the group would upload their original music to their official YouTube channel for the first few years, Strawberry Prince's first commercial release would not be until 2019, with the release of the mini-album Strawberry Start in March 2019. Strawberry Start sold over 80,000 copies in its debut week and achieved the second place spot on the Oricon weekly album ranking. Four months later, they released their first full album, Strawberry Love! This time, the group would achieve the first place spot on the Oricon weekly album ranking, with the album selling 72,000 copies on its first day and over 107,000 copies in its first week. They would rank first again with their third full album, Strawberry Prince, which exceeded 230,000 sales in its first week and would also be the group's first album to receive a Platinum certification from the Recording Industry Association of Japan in November 2020. The second full album, Strawberry Next!, would also receive a Platinum certification in January 2021. The group's first extended play, Are You Ready?, was released on August 1, 2022. Following the pause in activities from Nanamori and Jel, the remaining four members would release Here We Go!! on December 21, 2022, which sold 165,000 copies in its first week and achieved the number one spot on the Oricon weekly album ranking. After Nanamori and Jel returned, the group released their first single album, Hajimari no Monogatari, on June 5, 2024. Hajimari no Monogatari sold 224,000 copies in its first week and ranked first on Oricon's weekly singles ranking, and became the group's first album to receive a Double Platinum certification. On January 8, 2025, the group released Strawberry Prince Forever, a greatest hits album. It debuted at first place on the Oricon weekly album ranking, selling 73,000 copies in its first week.

Strawberry Prince's music has been featured in other media, particularly in the Yo-kai Watch and Cardfight!! Vanguard franchises. The songs "Gingira Ginga" and "Dai Uchū Rendezvous" were used as ending themes for the video game Yo-kai Watch Jam: Yo-kai Academy Y – Waiwai Gakuen Seikatsu and as opening themes for the anime Yo-kai Watch Jam – Yo-kai Academy Y: Close Encounters of the N Kind, and the song "Yōkai Watch" was used as the opening theme for the video game Yo-kai Watch 4++. In the Cardfight!! Vanguard series, the song "Start" was used as the opening theme for the second season of the anime Cardfight!! Vanguard overDress, the song "Accelerate" was used as the opening theme for the second season of Cardfight!! Vanguard will+Dress, and the song "Shukumei" was used as the opening theme for the second season of Cardfight!! Vanguard Divinez. In February 2022, the members appeared in an anime-style television commercial for Meiji Seika. In 2023, Strawberry Prince was invited to participate in NHK Kōhaku Uta Gassen, an annual New Year's Eve television special that features Japan's top musical acts. The group sang "Suki Suki Seijin" and appeared on stage as 3D holograms of their avatars. The holograms mimicked the movements the actual members were performing in another studio.

In March 2022, the YouTuber Korekore claimed that Nanamori had a fiancée and child and accused him of infidelity. STPR Inc., the parent company of the group's record label, put out a statement a few days later confirming that the allegations were true and stating that Nanamori would be going on hiatus. A live concert that had been scheduled for May 2022 was confirmed to be going ahead with only the other five members. In August 2022, Jel announced that he would be going on hiatus following a concert later that month due to depression. On December 14, 2022, Nanamori stated that he would be resuming his activities solo but that he would not be rejoining Strawberry Prince for the time being. Nanamori and Jel announced their returns to Strawberry Prince on January 27, 2024. In December 2024, Nanamori announced that he would be stepping back from performing again to focus on producing and managing STPR Inc.

On October 18, 2026, Satomi and Nanamori announced they would be leaving Strawberry Prince. Satomi announced he would be continuing his livestreaming activities solo, while Nanamori would continue with producing and managing STPR Inc.

== Anime film ==
- Gekijōban SutoPuri Hajimari no Monogatari: Strawberry School Festival!!!!

劇場版すとぷり はじまりの物語～Strawberry School Festival!!!～
- Created by: Masato Kashiwabara
- Anime film
- Directed by: Naoki Matsuura
- Produced by: Nanamori
- Written by: Chika Suzumura
- Music by: STPR Records
- Studio: Liden Films
- Released: July 19, 2024
- Runtime: 83 minutes

An anime film adaptation of the band was announced on March 24, 2024. Titled Gekijōban SutoPuri Hajimari no Monogatari: Strawberry School Festival!!!!, it was produced by Liden Films and directed by Naoki Matsuura, with Chika Suzumura writing the script, Yumi Nakamura designing the characters, and STPR Records producing the music. The film premiered in Japanese theaters on July 19, 2024.

== Members ==
=== Current members ===
- Jel (ジェル)
- Colon (ころん)
- Rinu (莉犬)
- Root (るぅと)

=== Former members ===
- Nanamori (ななもり。)
- Satomi (さとみ)

== Discography ==
=== Albums ===
Title	Year	Album details	Peak position	Certifications
Title	Year	Album details	JPN	Certifications
Strawberry Love!	2019	Released: July 3, 2019; Label: STPR Records; Formats: CD, CD+DVD, digital download; Track listing: 1. "Go Go Crazy"; 2. "Move On!"; 3. "Bokura Dake no Shangri-La"; 4. "Anniversary"; 5. "King of Judōtai"; 6. "Michishirube"; 7. "Suki ni Natte Ii yo ne?" 8. "Yosakoi Disco Party"; 9. "Don't Give Up!!"; 10. "Break Out"; 11. "Day by Day"; 12. "No Perfect"; 13. "Asa no Yūhi"; 14. "Okaeri Love!"	1	RIAJ: Gold
Strawberry Next!	2020	Released: January 15, 2020; Label: STPR Records; Formats: CD, CD+DVD, digital download; Track listing: 1. "Strawberry ☆ Planet!"; 2. "Gingira Ginga"; 3. "Amore Mio"; 4. "Next Stage!!"; 5. "Now and Forever"; 6. "Party Light"; 7. "Shinobi Koi"; 8. "Yōkai Watch"; 9. "Yū-jū Ukio Boy"; 10. "Nōnai Pierrot"; 11. "Sakasete Koi no 1・2・3!"; 12. "Hikari Yume"; 13. "Look Up"; 14. "Tarareba"; 15. "Suki de Ite Kurete Ii yo" 16. "Kakumei Zenya"	2	RIAJ: Platinum
Strawberry Prince	2020	Released: November 11, 2020; Label: STPR Records; Formats: CD, CD+DVD, digital download; Track listing: 1. "Streamer"; 2. "Suki Suki Seijin"; 3. "Very"; 4. "Dai Uchū Rendezvous"; 5. "Strawberry Revolution"; 6. "Strike the Prison!!"; 7. "Dramatic no Anti"; 8. "Night of Fantastic"; 9. "Jamujamu Signal"; 10. "Mabushigariya"; 11. "Shiki"; 12. "Enkyori Cry"; 13. "Chekira ☆"; 14. "Leveling"; 15. "Trick or Prince"; 16. "Spill"; 17. "Mukō e" 18. "Hajimete Kimi to" 19. "Feel Free!"; 20. "Prince"	1	RIAJ: Platinum
Here We Go!!	2022	Released: December 21, 2022; Label: STPR Records; Formats: CD, CD+DVD, digital download; Track listing: 1. "Seishun Chocolate" (Christmas Version); 2. "Christmas Love"; 3. "Naisho no Present for You!"; 4. "Here We Go!!"; 5. "Jumper!"; 6. "Inu-kei Danshi Rusuban-chū"; 7. "Shinshun Rabyutto!"; 8. "Itazura Night March"; 9. "Tensei Shitara Ōji-sama Datta Ken!"; 10. "Gabu・Gabu・Love!"; 11. "Hull Train"; 12. "Dotabata Osawagase Everyday!"; 13. "Tenshi ni Kuchizuke"; 14. "Ready Go!!"; 15. "Accelerate"; 16. "Frog Man"; 17. "Very Very Love"; 18. "Tsuraiya-iya"; 19. "Yoakeiro"; 20. "Hekireki"; 21. "Stars and Prayers"; 22. "Kibō no Chū Shiyō"; 23. "Te o Tsunaide Arukō"	1	RIAJ: Gold
Strawberry Prince Forever	2025	Released: January 8, 2025; Label: STPR Records; Formats: CD, CD+DVD, digital download; Track listing Disc 1: 1. "Strawberry Prince Forever"; 2. "Streamer"; 3. "Suki Suki Seijin"; 4. "Strawberry ☆ Planet!"; 5. "Gingira Ginga"; 6. "Very Very Love"; 7. "Strawberry Kiss"; 8. "Seishun Chocolate"; 9. "Ichigo-iro Natsu Hanabi"; 10. "Palette Dance"; 11. "Strawberry Happy (Instrumental)"; 12. "Mabushigariya"; 13. "Feel Free!"; 14. "Jumper!"; 15. "Parade wa Kokosa"; 16. "Hurry Hurry Love"; 17. "Prince"; 18. "Propose"; 19. "Daisuki ni Nareba Iin Janai?"; 20. "Okaeri Love!"; 21. "Dreaming Parade"; Disc 2: 1. "Chikai no Hanataba o (With You)"; 2. "SutoPuri no Limit Sengen! Strawberry Prince NO LIMIT"; 3. "Hull Train"; 4. "Chikoku Shite mo Ii Jan"; 5. "Amore Mio"; 6. "Sakasete Koi no 1・2・3!"; 7. "Strawberry Sweet (Instrumental)"; 8. "Yurayura"; 9. "Enkyori Cry"; 10. "Pure Pure Ichigo"; 11. "Chocolate Hanbunko"; 12. "Valentine Day Kimi o Hanasanai!"; 13. "Kibō no Chū Shiyō"; 14. "Umareta Sono Toki kara (Gekijō-ban SutoPuri ver.)" 15. "Inu-kei Danshi Rusuban-chū"; 16. "Ohime-sama ni Natte Ii yo" 17. "Christmas Love"; 18. "Suki de Ite Kurete Ii yo" 19. "Suki ni Natte Ii yo ne?" 20. "Saishū Ressha"; 21. "Uten Kekkō"; Disc 3: 1. "Here We Go!!"; 2. "Are You Ready?"; 3. "Bokura Dake no Shangri-La"; 4. "Move On!"; 5. "AquaKiss"; 6. "Go Go Crazy"; 7. "Next Stage!!"; 8. "Stay Proud"; 9. "Strike the Prison!!"; 10. "Syndrome Love"; 11. "Strawberry Enjoy Party (Instrumental)"; 12. "Yosakoi Disco Party"; 13. "Panpi Janai no yo!" 14. "159%"; 15. "Shinobi Koi"; 16. "Dramatic no Anti"; 17. "Literacy"; 18. "Shukumei"; 19. "Ride on Time"; 20. "Aimai"; 21. "Again"; Disc 4: 1. "Niji no Hajimari"; 2. "Hikari Yume"; 3. "Anniversary"; 4. "Tenshi ni Kuchizuke"; 5. "Kūsō Electica"; 6. "Tsuraiya-iya"; 7. "Tarareba"; 8. "Namidame"; 9. "Mukō e" 10. "Te o Tsunaide Arukō (Orchestra ver.)" 11. "Strawberry Love (Instrumental)"; 12. "Koi no Yukue"; 13. "33414"; 14. "Stars and Prayers"; 15. "Soba ni Iru kara" 16. "San-gatsu no Orange"; 17. "Asa no Yūhi"; 18. "Flowering Palettes"; 19. "Spreading Palettes"; 20. "Believe"; 21. "Strawberry Prince Forever (Orchestra ver.)"	1	RIAJ: Gold

=== Mini albums ===
Title	Year	Album details	Peak position	Certifications
Title	Year	Album details	JPN	Certifications
Strawberry Start	2019	Released: March 27, 2019; Label: STPR Records; Formats: CD, digital download; Track listing: 1. "Palette Dance"; 2. "Endless Flight"; 3. "Hi Ria Dream Mōsō-chū!"; 4. "Dekoboko Game Party"; 5. "Strawberry Go Round"; 6. "AquaKiss"; 7. "Hurry Hurry Love"; 8. "Daisuki ni Nareba Iin Janai?"	2	RIAJ: Gold

=== Extended plays ===
Title	Year	Album details
Are You Ready?	2022	Released: August 1, 2022; Label: STPR Records; Formats: Digital download; Track listing: 1. Are You Ready?; 2. "Ride on Time"; 3. "Hoshi no Gotoku"; 4. "Strawberry Kiss"; 5. "Shirubeboshi"; 6. "33414"; 7. "Strawberry Smile Magic"; 8. "Parade wa Koko kara"
Strawberry Prince Lofi Remix	2022	Released: September 16, 2022; Label: STPR Records; Formats: Digital download; Track listing: 1. "Daisuki ni Nareba Iin Janai?" (Lofi Remix / Instrumental); 2. "Propose" (Lofi Remix / Instrumental); 3. "Prince" (Lofi Remix / Instrumental); 4. "Strawberry Kiss" (Lofi Remix / Instrumental); 5. "Okaeri Love!" (Lofi Remix / Instrumental)
Strawberry Prince Lofi Remix Vol.2	2022	Released: December 9, 2022; Label: STPR Records; Formats: Digital download; Track listing: 1. "Seishun Chocolate" (Lofi Remix / Instrumental); 2. "Bokura Dake no Shangri-La" (Lofi Remix / Instrumental); 3. "Mabushigariya" (Lofi Remix / Instrumental); 4. "Amore Mio" (Lofi Remix / Instrumental); 5. "Streamer" (Lofi Remix / Instrumental)
Niji-iro History	2023	Released: July 31, 2023; Label: STPR Records; Formats: Digital download; Track listing: 1. "Niji-iro History"; 2. "STPRQUEST"; 3. "FF&Flapping"; 4. "Yurayura"; 5. "Re☆STARt"; 6. "Chocolate Hanbunko"; 7. "Hanamirai"; 8. "Saikō no Takaramono"

=== Single albums ===
Title	Year	Album details	Peak position	Certifications
Title	Year	Album details	JPN	Certifications
Hajimari no Monogatari	2024	Released: June 5, 2024; Label: STPR Records; Formats: CD, digital download; Track listing: 1. "Chikai no Hanataba o (With You)"; 2. "Niji no Hajimari"; 3. "Uten Kekkō"	1	RIAJ: Double Platinum

=== Singles ===
Title	Year	Release date	Album
"Ichigo-iro Natsu Hanabi"	2020	May 30, 2020	N/A
"Strawberry Halloween Night"	2020	May 30, 2020	N/A
"Parade wa Kokosa"	2020	May 30, 2020	N/A
"Christmas no Mahō"	2020	May 30, 2020	N/A
"Strawberry Nightmare"	2020	May 30, 2020	N/A
"Mabushigariya"	2020	May 30, 2020	Strawberry Prince
"Suki Suki Seijin"	2020	June 22, 2020	Strawberry Prince
"Dai Uchū Rendezvous"	2020	August 10, 2020	Strawberry Prince
"Streamer"	2020	August 24, 2020	Strawberry Prince
"Senbonzakura"	2020	December 31, 2020	N/A
"White Promise"	2021	April 7, 2021	N/A
"Namidame"	2021	May 5, 2021	N/A
"Mr. Music"	2021	June 2, 2021	N/A
"Kibun Jōjō↑↑"	2021	June 2, 2021	N/A
"Propose"	2021	June 6, 2021	N/A
"Stay Proud"	2021	June 26, 2021	N/A
"Syndrome Love"	2021	July 18, 2021	N/A
"Risk Taker"	2021	August 4, 2021	N/A
"Stereo Parade"	2021	August 29, 2021	N/A
"Parade e Okaeri"	2021	October 10, 2021	N/A
"Meshimase Trick Night"	2021	October 31, 2021	N/A
"Start"	2021	December 5, 2021	N/A
"Seishun Chocolate"	2022	February 14, 2022	N/A
"Blessing"	2022	May 1, 2022	N/A
"Shirubeboshi"	2022	May 8, 2022	Are You Ready?
"Strawberry Smile Magic"	2022	June 4, 2022	Are You Ready?
"Natsu Matsuri"	2022	August 21, 2022	N/A
"Yoakeiro"	2022	September 19, 2022	Here We Go!!
"Te o Tsunaide Arukō"	2022	October 23, 2022	Here We Go!!
"Itazura Night March"	2022	October 30, 2022	Here We Go!!
"Goodbye Sengen"	2022	December 21, 2022	N/A
"Inochi ni Kirawareteiru"	2022	December 21, 2022	N/A
"Chocolate Hanbunko"	2023	February 5, 2023	Niji-iro History
"Saikō no Takaramono"	2023	March 5, 2023	Niji-iro History
"Hanamirai"	2023	April 2, 2023	Niji-iro History
"Te o Tsunaide Arukō (Orchestra ver.)"	2023	April 30, 2023	N/A
"Fall in Night"	2023	October 29, 2023	N/A
"Mikansei no Scenario"	2023	November 19, 2023	N/A
"Party in the Box!"	2023	December 25, 2023	N/A
"SutoPuri Kamikyoku Medley"	2024	January 28, 2024	N/A
"Valentine Day Kimi o Hanasanai!"	2024	February 11, 2024	N/A
"Pure Pure Ichigo"	2024	March 17, 2024	N/A
"Sangatsu no Orange"	2024	March 24, 2024	N/A
"Soba ni Iru kara"	2024	March 31, 2024	N/A
"Literacy"	2024	April 27, 2024	N/A
"SutoPuri no Limit Sengen! Strawberry Prince No Limit"	2024	May 5, 2024	N/A
"Ohime-sama ni Natte Ii yo"	2024	June 4, 2024	N/A
"Shukumei"	2024	July 6, 2024	N/A
"159%"	2024	August 10, 2024	N/A
"Miracle Shopping (Don Quijote no Tēma)"	2024	August 12, 2024	N/A
"Ichigo-iro Natsu Hanabi (Special Arrange Ver. 2024)"	2024	August 31, 2024	N/A
"Again"	2024	September 1, 2024	N/A
"Aimai"	2024	September 29, 2024	N/A
"Strawberry Prince Forever"	2024	October 26, 2024	N/A
"Dreaming Parade"	2024	November 3, 2024	N/A
"Streamer (Special Arrange Ver. 2024)"	2024	November 10, 2024	N/A
"Propose (Orchestra ver.)"	2024	November 17, 2024	N/A
"Koi no Yukue"	2024	November 24, 2024	N/A
"Game Changer"	2024	December 15, 2024	N/A
"Daisuki ga Todoku made"	2025	February 14, 2025	N/A
"Negai Kaze"	2025	June 4, 2025	N/A
"Chaos Terror"	2025	July 17, 2025	N/A
"Mirai no Kimi kara Daijōbu!"	2025	July 25, 2025	N/A
"Himitsu no Chocolate"	2026	February 14, 2026	
"Cinderella"	2026	June 4, 2026	
"Iya Iya Seijin"	2026	June 14, 2026	
"Kakumei Zenya"	2026	October 5, 2026	

== Filmography ==
=== Television ===
Year	Title	Japanese title	Network	Ref.
2022–2023	SutoPuri Here!We!Go!!	すとぷりのHere!We!GO!!	TV Tokyo	
2023	SutoPuri Quest	すとぷりくえすとっ	TV Tokyo	
2024–present	Zenryoku Chōsen! SutoPuri no Limit: Ichigo Gakuen Hōsō-bu	全力挑戦！すとぷりnoりみっと -苺学園放送部-	TBS	

=== Radio shows ===
Year	Title	Japanese title	Network	Ref.
2019	SutoPuri Monday	すとぷりMonday	Nippon Broadcasting System	
2019–2020	SutoPuri Stop Listen!	すとぷりのStop Listen!	Nippon Broadcasting System	

== Bibliography ==
Year	Title	Japanese title	Publisher	Identifiers
2019	Strawberry Memory vol.1	すとろべりーめもりー vol.1	Sunny Side-up	ISBN 9784909196033
2019	Strawberry Memory vol.2	すとろべりーめもりー vol.2	Sunny Side-up	ISBN 9784909196040
2019	Strawberry Memory vol.3	すとろべりーめもりー vol.3	Sunny Side-up	ISBN 9784909196057
2019	Strawberry Memory vol.4	すとろべりーめもりー vol.4	Sunny Side-up	ISBN 9784909196064
2020	Strawberry Memory vol.5	すとろべりーめもりー vol.5	Sunny Side-up	ISBN 9784909196071
2020	Strawberry Memory vol.6	すとろべりーめもりー vol.6	Sunny Side-up	ISBN 9784909196088
2021	Strawberry Memory vol.7	すとろべりーめもりー vol.7	Sunny Side-up	ISBN 9784909196095

== Awards and nominations ==
Year	Award Ceremony	Category	Nominee/Work	Result	Ref.
2020	Japan Gold Disc Award	Best 5 New Artists in Japanese Music	Strawberry Prince	Won	
2021	Japan Gold Disc Award	Best 5 Albums in Japanese Music	Strawberry Prince	Won	
