= Satomi (singer, born 1993) =

- Born: February 24, 1993 (age 33); Tokyo, Japan
- Genre: J-pop
- Instrument: Vocals
- Years active: 2016–present
- Label: STPR Records
- Formerly of: Strawberry Prince

Satomi (さとみ, Satomi; born February 24, 1993) is a Japanese singer and live streamer. He is a former member of the J-pop group Strawberry Prince.

== Career ==
Satomi was recruited by Nanamori to join Strawberry Prince in mid-2016. On September 9, 2019, he released his first solo mini-album, Memories. It placed second on the Oricon weekly album ranking and first on the Oricon daily album ranking. He released his first full album, Never End, on September 13, 2023. It placed second on the Oricon weekly album ranking and first on the Oricon daily album ranking. His second full album, S's, released on September 24, 2025, and ranked third on the Oricon weekly album ranking.

On August 19, 2021, Satomi released an official fanbook, Satomi Memory. The book ranked first on the Oricon weekly book ranking.

Satomi suspended his activities with Strawberry Prince from July 2025 to September 2025 to prepare for the release of his second full album and a solo concert in September.

On October 18, 2026, Satomi announced he would be leaving Strawberry Prince and continuing his activities solo.

== Discography ==
=== Albums ===
Title	Year	Album details	Peak position	Certifications
Title	Year	Album details	JPN	Certifications
Never End	2023	Released: September 13, 2023; Label: STPR Records; Formats: CD, CD+DVD, digital download; Track listing: 1. "Never End"; 2. "Kanjō-iro"; 3. "Yōidon"; 4. "Sugar Taste"; 5. "Save you" 6. "My Heroine"; 7. "Present"; 8. "Starlight Moonlight"; 9. "Contact"; 10. "Motto"; 11. "Zurui Hito"; 12. "Warui Ko no Dance"; 13. "Assault Love"; 14. "Midnight Magic"; 15. "Kyō ga Hajimaru"; 16. "Wanderer"	2	RIAJ: Gold
S's	2025	Released: September 24, 2025; Label: STPR Records; Formats: CD, digital download; Track listing: 1. "Curve"; 2. "Strawberry Shadow"; 3. "Lyra"; 4. "Namida-iro 2025 ver." 5. "Lovret"; 6. "Namida no Junban"; 7. "Uncontrollable"; 8. "Tick Tick Tock"; 9. "Ao ni Somaru"; 10. "Kūran"; 11. "Aimai Heart"; 12. "Summer Hugs You"; 13. "Nani ga Dekiru ka na" 14. "Echoes"; 15. "Kimi no Iru Sekai"	3	

=== Mini-albums ===
Title	Year	Album details	Peak position
Title	Year	Album details	JPN
Memories	2019	Released: September 9, 2019; Label: STPR Records; Formats: CD, digital download; Track listing: 1. "Sekidō Señor"; 2. "Love Sick"; 3. "Namida-iro"; 4. "Kimi shika Aisenai"; 5. "Still Love"; 6. "Yakusoku"; 7. "Feeling Love"; 8. "Koi o Hajimeyō"	2

=== Singles ===
Title	Year
"Code (Angō Kaidoku)"	2020
"Wanderer"	2020
"World Lampshade"	2020
"Assault Love"	2021
"Irony"	2021
"Kanjō-iro"	2022
"Yōidon"	2023
"Kūran"	2024
"Umareta Sono Toki kara"	2024
"Aimai Heart"	2025
"Miren"	2025
"Other Cut/Azakatto"	2026

== Filmography ==
=== Film ===
Year	Title	Role	Source
2024	Gekijōban SutoPuri Hajimari no Monogatari: Strawberry School Festival!!!!	Himself	

=== Anime ===
Year	Title	Role	Source
2020	Yo-kai Watch Jam – Yo-kai Academy Y: Close Encounters of the N Kind	Wakata Hayaoshi	
2023	Cardfight!! Vanguard will+Dress	Tenma Sakurai	
