= Billboard Japan Hot Albums =

Weekly national albums chart by Billboard Japan

The Billboard Japan Hot Albums, also referred to as Combined Albums, is the primary album record chart published by Billboard Japan. It is released weekly on Thursday in Japan Standard Time.

The Hot Albums was launched on the week dated June 4, 2015, with Superfly's White (2015) as the inaugural number one. It initially ranked albums based on a combination of physical sales, digital downloads, and PC look-ups, and was the only combined albums chart in Japan until the establishment of the Oricon Combined Albums Chart in December 2018. Since December 2024, the chart has been based on physical sales, digital downloads, and streaming; the look-up factor was removed after Billboard Japan became unable to collect such data from the provider since October 2022. Physical sales units are provided by SoundScan Japan, whereas GfK Japan tracks digital downloads from Amazon, iTunes, Mora, Mu-mo, and RecoChoku, with additional iTunes data courtesy of Luminate, and streaming from Amazon, Apple Music, and Spotify, etc. In June 2025, Billboard Japan introduced the recurrent rule for the Hot Albums, alongside the Japan Hot 100, applying to albums charting more than 26 weeks. It came into effect on the chart week of June 4.

Seventeen holds the record for most number ones on the chart with a total of 14. For specific albums, Arirang (2026) by BTS has the record for most weeks at number ones on the chart, with 11. Back Number's Encore (2016) has the most total chart weeks with 319; Kenshi Yonezu with Yankee (2014), Dreams Come True with their aforementioned album, Yumi Matsutoya with Nihon no Koi to, Yuming to (2012), and Southern All Stars with Umi no Yeah!! (1998) are the only other artists to have albums surpass 200 weeks.

== Lists of number-one albums ==
- 2015
- 2016
- 2017
- 2020
- 2021
- 2022
- 2023
- 2024
- 2025
- 2026

== Album and artist records ==
=== Albums with most weeks at number one ===
Albums with three or more weeks atop the Billboard Japan Hot Albums
Weeks	Artist	Album	Release year	Ref.
11	BTS	Arirang	2026	
7	Dreams Come True	Dreams Come True The Best! Watashi no Dorikamu	2015	
5	Kana Nishino	Just Love	2016	
5	Snow Man	The Best 2020–2025	2025	
5	Mrs. Green Apple	10	2025	
4	Hikaru Utada	Fantôme	2016	
4	Back Number	Encore	2016	
4	Radwimps	Your Name	2016	
4	Mr. Children	Jūryoku to Kokyū	2018	
4	Gen Hoshino	Pop Virus	2018	
4	Back Number	Magic	2019	
4	Arashi	5x20 All the Best!! 1999–2019	2019	
4	Kenshi Yonezu	Stray Sheep	2020	
4	Mrs. Green Apple	Antenna	2023	
4	Fujii Kaze	Prema	2025	
4	Number_i	No. II	2025	
4	Mrs. Green Apple	Pops	2026	
3	Back Number	Chandelier	2015	
3	Keisuke Kuwata	Garakuta	2017	
3	Namie Amuro	Finally	2017	
3	Various artists	The Greatest Showman: Original Motion Picture Soundtrack	2017	
3	Hikaru Utada	Hatsukoi	2018	
3	BTS	BTS, the Best	2021	
3	Hana	Hana	2026	

=== Artists with most weeks at number one ===
Artists with five or more weeks atop the Billboard Japan Hot Albums
Weeks	Artist	Ref.
22	BTS	
15	Seventeen	
12	Back Number	
11	Arashi	
11	Mr. Children	
11	Hikaru Utada	
10	Radwimps	
9	Hey! Say! JUMP	
8	Dreams Come True	
7	Kenshi Yonezu	
6	Keisuke Kuwata	
6	Kana Nishino	
6	Snow Man	
5	Ado	
5	Gen Hoshino	

=== Albums with most chart weeks ===
Key
†	Indicates album which charted within the last chart week (as of January 2025)

Albums with over 100 weeks on the Billboard Japan Hot Albums
Weeks	Artist	Album	Release year	Ref.
332	Back Number	Encore †	2016	
222	Kenshi Yonezu	Yankee †	2014	
219	Southern All Stars	Umi no Yeah!!	1998	
208	Dreams Come True	Dreams Come True The Best! Watashi no Dorikamu	2015	
207	Ayumi Hamasaki	A Complete: All Singles	2008	
206	Yumi Matsutoya	Nihon no Koi to, Yuming to	2012	
187	Kenshi Yonezu	Bootleg †	2017	
186	Kenshi Yonezu	Bremen	2015	
184	One Ok Rock	Niche Syndrome †	2010	
175	Fujii Kaze	Help Ever Hurt Never †	2022	
166	Globe	15 Years: Best Hit Selection	2010	
161	Official Hige Dandism	Traveler †	2019	
154	Kenshi Yonezu	Stray Sheep †	2020	
151	Yoasobi	The Book †	2021	
136	King Gnu	Ceremony †	2020	
136	Ado	Kyōgen †	2022	
134	Yoasobi	The Book 2 †	2021	
133	Aimyon	Momentary Sixth Sense †	2019	
124	Aimyon	Excitement of Youth †	2017	
123	Mrs. Green Apple	Attitude †	2019	
122	Gen Hoshino	Yellow Dancer	2015	
122	Vaundy	Strobo †	2020	
121	Arashi	5x20 All the Best!! 1999–2019	2019	
120	Yuuri	Ichi †	2022	
115	Fujii Kaze	Love All Serve All †	2022	
114	Official Hige Dandism	Escaparade †	2018	
110	Ado	Uta's Songs: One Piece Film Red †	2022	
110	Ed Sheeran	÷ †	2017	
109	King Gnu	Sympa	2019	
107	Aimyon	Heard That There's Good Pasta †	2020	
105	Bruno Mars	Doo-Wops & Hooligans †	2010	
105	Radwimps	Your Name	2019	
104	The Blue Hearts	The Blue Hearts 30th Anniversary All Time Memorial: Super Selected Songs	2015	
104	One Ok Rock	Ambitions	2017	
102	One Ok Rock	35xxxv	2015	
102	Hikaru Utada	Fantôme	2016	
100	SixTones	1ST	2021	
