= List of Billboard Japan Hot Albums number ones of 2025 =

The following is a list of weekly number-one albums on the Billboard Japan Hot Albums chart in 2025.

== Chart history ==
Number-one albums of 2025 on the Billboard Japan Hot Albums
Issue date	Album	Artist(s)	Ref.
January 1	Nantettatte AKB48	AKB48	
January 8	Antenna	Mrs. Green Apple	
January 16	Antenna	Mrs. Green Apple	
January 22	Gold	SixTones	
January 29	The Best 2020–2025	Snow Man	
February 5	Prezent	Zerobaseone	
February 12	Awake	NiziU	
February 19	Antenna	Mrs. Green Apple	
February 26	D.N.A	Ae! Group	
March 5	Hello! We're Timelesz	Timelesz	
March 12	Hello! We're Timelesz	Timelesz	
March 19	A.H.O. (Audio Hang Out)	West.	
March 26	Thank You So Much	Southern All Stars	
April 2	Antenna	Mrs. Green Apple	
April 9	Be Classic	JO1	
April 16	The Best 2020–2025	Snow Man	
April 23	The Best 2020–2025	Snow Man	
April 30	The Best 2020–2025	Snow Man	
May 7	The Best 2020–2025	Snow Man	
May 14	Why Don't You Bullet Train?	Bullet Train	
May 21	No Genre	BoyNextDoor	
May 28	Magfact	Kis-My-Ft2	
June 4	Happy Burstday	Seventeen	
June 11	Desire: Unleash	Enhypen	
June 18	Fam	Timelesz	
June 25	Hollow	Stray Kids	
July 2	The Origin	INI	
July 9	Bon Bon Voyage	Naniwa Danshi	
July 16	10	Mrs. Green Apple	
July 23	10	Mrs. Green Apple	
July 30	The Star Chapter: Together	Tomorrow X Together	
August 6	10	Mrs. Green Apple	
August 13	10	Mrs. Green Apple	
August 20	10	Mrs. Green Apple	
August 27	Glass Heart	Tenblank	
September 3	Enemy	Twice	
September 10	Prema	Fujii Kaze	
September 17	Prema	Fujii Kaze	
September 24	Prema	Fujii Kaze	
October 1	No. II	Number_i	
October 8	No. II	Number_i	
October 15	Anew	Radwimps	
October 22	Prema	Fujii Kaze	
October 29	Starkissed	Tomorrow X Together	
November 5	Back to Life	&Team	
November 12	Onkochishin	Snow Man	
November 19	FYOP	B'z	
November 26	Dear Jubilee: Radwimps Tribute	Various artists	
December 3	Dear Jubilee: Radwimps Tribute	Various artists	
December 10	'S Travelers	Travis Japan	
December 17	No. II	Number_i	
December 24	No. II	Number_i	
December 31	Starring	King & Prince	

== See also ==
- List of Hot 100 number-one singles of 2025 (Japan)
