= List of Hot 100 number-one singles of 2025 (Japan) =

The following is a list of weekly number-one singles on the Billboard Japan Hot 100 chart in 2025.

== Chart history ==
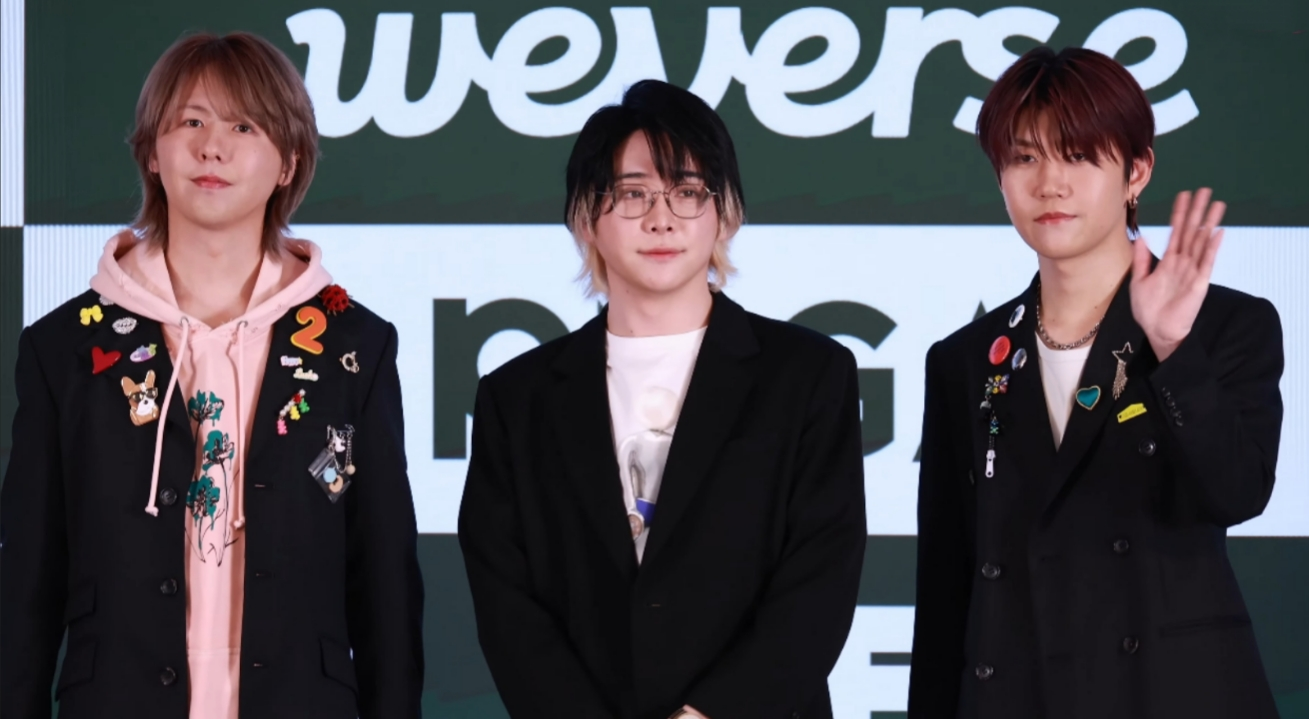
Mrs. Green Apple topped the Hot 100 for nine weeks with "Lilac", "Kusushiki", "Heaven" and "Breakfast", making them the artist with the second-most weeks spent atop the chart in 2025.

Hana achieved their first three number-one songs with their debut single "Rose", "Blue Jeans", and "Bad Love". "Rose" topped the chart for two non-consecutive weeks in 2025.

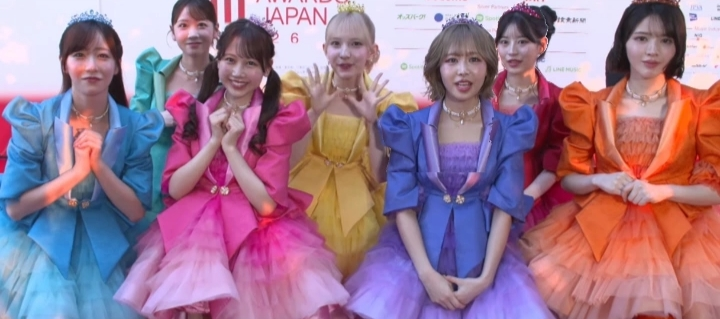
Fruits Zipper achieved their first number-one songs with "Kawaitte Magic".

Number-one singles of 2025 on the Japan Hot 100
Issue date	Song	Artist(s)	Ref.
January 1	"APT."	Rosé and Bruno Mars	
January 8	"Lilac"	Mrs. Green Apple	
January 15	"Lilac"	Mrs. Green Apple	
January 22	"Lilac"	Mrs. Green Apple	
January 29	"Plazma"	Kenshi Yonezu	
February 5	"God_i"	Number_i	
February 12	"Spacecraft"	Be:First	
February 19	"Lilac"	Mrs. Green Apple	
February 26	"Udagawa Generation"	Sakurazaka46	
March 5	"Doki It"	Naniwa Danshi	
March 12	"Say I Do"	Travis Japan	
March 19	"Heart"	King & Prince	
March 26	"Lilac"	Mrs. Green Apple	
April 2	"Navel Orange"	Nogizaka46	
April 9	"Rose"	Hana	
April 16	"Kusushiki"	Mrs. Green Apple	
April 23	"Kusushiki"	Mrs. Green Apple	
April 30	"Rose"	Hana	
May 7	"Blue Amber"	Back Number	
May 14	"Heaven"	Mrs. Green Apple	
May 21	"Kawaitte Magic"	Fruits Zipper	
May 28	"God_i"	Number_i	
June 4	"Grit"	Be:First	
June 11	"Boyz"	SixTones	
June 18	"Plazma"	Kenshi Yonezu	
June 25	"Breakfast"	Mrs. Green Apple	
July 2	"Make or Break"	Sakurazaka46	
July 9	"Nice to See You Again"	TWS	
July 16	"Kakurenbo"	Plave	
July 23	"Blue Jeans"	Hana	
July 30	"Serious"	Snow Man	
August 6	"Same Numbers"	Nogizaka46	
August 13	"What We Got (Kiseki wa Kimi to)"	King & Prince	
August 20	"Mikakunin Ryōiki"	Number_i	
August 27	"Count to Love"	BoyNextDoor	
September 3	"Charismax"	Snow Man	
September 10	"Asymmetry"	Naniwa Danshi	
September 17	"Bad Love"	Hana	
September 24	"Iris Out"	Kenshi Yonezu	
October 1	"Iris Out"	Kenshi Yonezu	
October 8	"Iris Out"	Kenshi Yonezu	
October 15	"Iris Out"	Kenshi Yonezu	
October 22	"Iris Out"	Kenshi Yonezu	
October 29	"Iris Out"	Kenshi Yonezu	
November 5	"Iris Out"	Kenshi Yonezu	
November 12	"Iris Out"	Kenshi Yonezu	
November 19	"Iris Out"	Kenshi Yonezu	
November 26	"Present"	INI	
December 3	"Biryani"	Nogizaka46	
December 10	"Iris Out"	Kenshi Yonezu	
December 17	"Lighting Up the Town"	Be:First	
December 24	"Iris Out"	Kenshi Yonezu	
December 31	"Iris Out"	Kenshi Yonezu	

== See also ==
- List of Billboard Japan Hot Albums number ones of 2025
