= Japanese Albums Chart =

Japanese Albums Chart may refer to:

- Oricon Albums Chart, the physical albums chart of Oricon
- Billboard Japan Hot Albums, the main albums chart of Billboard Japan
