= Soranji =

2022 single by Mrs. Green Apple

Single by Mrs. Green Apple

from the album Antenna
- Language: Japanese
- B-side: "I'm Invincible" "Floriginal"
- Released: November 9, 2022
- Length: 5:44
- Label: EMI
- Songwriter: Motoki Ohmori

Mrs. Green Apple singles chronology
"Dance Hall" (2022)	"Soranji" (2022)	"Boku no Koto (Orchestra ver.)" (2023)

"Soranji" is a song by Japanese rock band Mrs. Green Apple. It was released as the band's tenth single on November 9, 2022, under EMI Records. The song was used as the theme song for Fragments of the Last Will (2022), the film adaptation of Jun Henmi's 1989 novel Farewell Notes from a Prison Camp.

== Background and promotion ==
On August 17, 2022, it was announced that Mrs. Green Apple would be performing the theme song for Fragments of the Last Will, directed by Takahisa Zeze, to be released on December 9. The film is an adaptation of Jun Henmi's 1989 novel Farewell Notes from a Prison Camp, about the notes a man's family received a decade after World War II following his death in a Russian prison camp in Serbia. This would be the band's first film theme song in four years since "Ao to Natsu" for Ao-Natsu. On September 2, the group announced that the song would be released as a single on November 9, including "I'm Invincible", a cover of Ado's song of the same name written by Mrs. Green Apple vocalist Motoki Ohmori, from the soundtrack of One Piece Film: Red, and "Floriginal", a song created from "Parfa Tune", a project to collaborate fragrance and music.

Ohmori appeared at the stage greeting of Fragments of the Last Will alongside the film's cast members at Toho Cinema in Tokyo Midtown Hibiya and performed "Soranji" while playing the guitar.

== Composition ==
"Soranji" is a personal and introspective ballad that uses simple words to convey the message of a desire to live against a background of strings. Vocalist Motoki Ohmori, who wrote the song, said they were able to create the song "with an extraordinary feeling of exploring the meaning of life and touching the abyss" that people can relate to. The title was inspired by the word "recite from memory" (諳んじる, soranjiru), linked closely to Fragments of the Last Will.

"I'm Invincible" was originally released on June 22 as the second song in the soundtrack album where Ado worked with seven artists for songs from One Piece Film: Red. Production began in the summer of 2021 during Mrs. Green Apple's hiatus and was the first song they produced in this time. Ohmori stated that he "wanted a hook that clearly showed who provided the music", and that the song was about the feelings of Uta but also "who we were at the time".

"Floriginal" is a collaboration song with Fitz Corporation's fragrance and music project "Parfa Tune", where the company creates perfumes inspired by artists' songs. They used an incense scale (香階, kōkai), a musical scale that originates in England from the 19th century, where 46 fragrances are assigned to notes. Volatile scents are assigned to high notes, and weaker scents are assigned to low notes. The song was recorded without any rehearsals, with Ohmori saying that they "wanted to enjoy the feeling of reaching a slightly unexpected place, or having some kind of chemical reaction." Sound effects like the cutting of cellophane tape, the sound of stapling, the sound of tearing paper, footsteps, and the sound of removing a cap, were recorded by Ohmori and interspersed in the song.

== Music video ==
The music video for "Soranji" premiered on November 2, 2022. Vocalist Motoki Ohmori, credited as the music video's planning director, came up with the original idea for the music video and worked together with the video's director Yoshiharu Seri. The lyric video was released on December 22, with handwritten lyrics by Ohmori.

== Track listing ==
All tracks are written by Motoki Ohmori.

"Soranji" track listing
No.	Title	Arrangement	Length
1.	"Soranji"	Ohmori; Effy	5:44
2.	"I'm Invincible" (私は最強)	Mrs. Green Apple; Ken Itō	4:16
3.	"Floriginal" (フロリジナル)	Ryō Hanai; Ohmori	4:45
Total length:			14:45

Bonus DVD
No.	Title	Director	Length
1.	"Documentary – Episode 2 "Soranji""	Kazuaki Kimura

== Charts ==
=== Weekly charts ===
Weekly chart performance for "Soranji"
Chart	Peak position
Japan (Japan Hot 100)	10
Japan (Oricon)	6
Japan Combined Singles (Oricon)	5

=== Year-end charts ===
2023 year-end chart performance for "Soranji"
Chart	Position
Japan (Japan Hot 100)	19

2024 year-end chart performance for "Soranji"
Chart (2024)	Position
Japan (Japan Hot 100)	12
Japan Combined Singles (Oricon)	9

2025 year-end chart performance for "Soranji"
Chart (2025)	Position
Japan (Japan Hot 100)	11
Japan Combined Singles (Oricon)	6

== Certifications ==
Certifications for "Soranji"
Region	Certification	Certified units/sales
Japan (RIAJ) Digital	Gold	100,000^{*}
Streaming
Japan (RIAJ)	Diamond	500,000,000^{†}
^{*} Sales figures based on certification alone.^{†} Streaming-only figures based on certification alone.
