= Nantettatte AKB48 =

- Digital cover

Studio album by AKB48
- Released: December 25, 2024
- Genre: J-pop
- Length: 56:50
- Language: Japanese
- Label: EMI; Universal Japan
- Producer: Yasushi Akimoto

AKB48 chronology
Bokutachi wa, Ano Hi no Yoake o Shitteiru (2018)	Nantettatte AKB48 (2024)

Singles from Nantettatte AKB48
- 1. "Nantettatte Idol" Released: November 19, 2024

Nantettatte AKB48 (Japanese: なんてったってAKB48; lit. 'After all, it is AKB48') is the seventh studio album by Japanese girl group AKB48. It was released on December 25, 2024, through EMI Records and Universal Music Japan, their first album in six years after their previous Bokutachi wa, Ano Hi no Yoake o Shitteiru (2018) and after departure from You Be Cool! and King Records in 2023.

Titled after Kyoko Koizumi's 1985 single "Nantettatte Idol" and based on the concept "idol time machine", the album comprises covers of idol songs from three different eras of Japan: Shōwa, Heisei, and Reiwa. Commercially, Nantettatte AKB48 debuted atop the Oricon Albums Chart and Billboard Japan Hot Albums, selling over 185,000 copies.

== Background and release ==
On November 19, 2024, AKB48 announced the studio album, titled Nantettatte AKB48, to be released on December 25. To commemorate their 20th anniversary, it consists of 14 cover versions of idol songs from three different eras of Japan: seven songs from Shōwa era, five from Heisei era, and two from Reiwa era. The limited edition Blu-ray disc includes performances on the last day at AKB48 Theater in Don Quijote, Akihabara before temporary closing due to renovation from September 1 to December 8, 2024.

== Promotion ==
Kyoko Koizumi's cover "Nantettatte Idol" was released as Nantettatte AKB48's lead single on November 19, 2024, the same day as the album announcement. Yuiri Murayama serves as the song's choreographic center. Its music video, directed by Shin Ishihara, premiered on December 25, depicting the existence of idols in the 1980s. The group performed "Nantettatte Idol" at 2024 FNS Music Festival on December 12, and CDTV Live! Live! on December 31. Additionally, Seiko Matsuda's "Cherry Blossom" and Morning Musume's "Love Machine" were available as a promotional singles on December 18.

== Commercial performance ==
Nantettatte AKB48 debuted at number one on the Oricon Albums Chart with 184,764 copies, becoming AKB48's sixth consecutive number-one albums and the ninth overall. The album entered the Billboard Japan Hot Albums at number one, earning 190,999 physical sales and 233 downloads.

== Track listing ==
Nantettatte AKB48 track listing
No.	Title	Lyrics	Music	Arrangement	Length
1.	"Toshishita no Otoko no Ko" (年下の男の子)	Kazuya Senke	Yūsuke Hoguchi	Lull	3:32
2.	"UFO"	Yū Aku	Shunichi Tokura	Shigeo Komori	3:15
3.	"Cherry Blossom" (チェリーブラッサム)	Yoshiko Miura	Kazuo Zaitsu	Kosuke Okui	3:21
4.	"Toki o Kakeru Shōjo" (時をかける少女)	Yumi Matsutoya	Matsutoya	Hinano Tanaka	3:49
5.	"Nantettatte Idol" (なんてったってアイドル)	Yasushi Akimoto	Kyōhei Tsutsumi	Yūki Utamaru	4:07
6.	"Desire (Jōnetsu)" (DESIRE -情熱-)	Yoko Aki	Kisaburō Suzuki	Kazuo Shiina; Kunio Kubota	4:21
7.	"Jā ne" (じゃあね)	Akimoto	Ken Takahashi	Tanaka	3:51
8.	"Samishii Nettaigyo" (淋しい熱帯魚)	Neko Oikawa	Masaya Ozeki	K3CP	4:29
9.	"Body & Soul"	Hiromasa Ijichi	Ijichi	Keisuke Kanesaki	5:04
10.	"Love Machine" (LOVEマシーン)	Tsunku	Tsunku	Kubota	5:01
11.	"Ikuze! Kaitō Shōjo" (行くぜっ!怪盗少女)	Kenichi Maeyamada	Maeyamada	Maeyamada	3:48
12.	"Kimi no Na wa Kibō" (君の名は希望)	Akimoto	Katsuhiko Sugiyama	Sugiyama; YouSee	5:23
13.	"Otonablue" (オトナブルー)	Atarashii Gakko!	Yonkey	YouSee	3:04
14.	"Kawaikute Gomen" (可愛くてごめん)	Shito	Shito	Tanaka	3:38
Total length:					56:50

Nantettatte AKB48 limited A bonus track (Blu-ray)
No.	Title	Length
1.	"AKB48 Theater Final Performance Before the Renovation: Record of the Day 6,843" (AKB48劇場リニューアル前最終公演~6843日目の記録~)
2.	"Reset (AKB48 Theater Final Performance Before the Renovation: Thank You for the Memories of 6,843 Days and 6,552 Performances)" (RESET (AKB48劇場リニューアル前最終公演~6843日6552公演の思い出をありがとう。~))
3.	"Theater no Megami (AKB48 Theater Final Performance Before the Renovation: Thank You for the Memories of 6,843 Days and 6,552 Performances)" (シアターの女神 (AKB48劇場リニューアル前最終公演~6843日6552公演の思い出をありがとう。~))
4.	"Mokugekisha (AKB48 Theater Final Performance Before the Renovation: Thank You for the Memories of 6,843 Days and 6,552 Performances)" (目撃者 (AKB48劇場リニューアル前最終公演~6843日6552公演の思い出をありがとう。~))
5.	"Sakura no Hanabiratachi (AKB48 Theater Final Performance Before the Renovation: Thank You for the Memories of 6,843 Days and 6,552 Performances)" (桜の花びらたち (AKB48劇場リニューアル前最終公演~6843日6552公演の思い出をありがとう。~))
Total length:		102:50

== Charts ==
=== Weekly charts ===
Weekly chart performance for Nantettatte AKB48
Chart (2024–2025)	Peak position
Japanese Albums (Oricon)	1
Japanese Combined Albums (Oricon)	1
Japanese Hot Albums (Billboard Japan)	1

=== Monthly charts ===
Monthly chart performance for Nantettatte AKB48
Chart (2024)	Position
Japanese Albums (Oricon)	3

=== Year-end charts ===
Year-end chart performance for Nantettatte AKB48
Chart (2025)	Position
Japanese Albums (Oricon)	27
Japanese Top Albums Sales (Billboard Japan)	29

== Certifications ==
Certifications for Nantettatte AKB48
Region	Certification	Certified units/sales
Japan (RIAJ) Physical	Gold	100,000^{^}
^{^} Shipments figures based on certification alone.

== Release history ==
Release dates and formats for Nantettatte AKB48
Region	Date	Format	Version	Label	Ref.
Various	December 25, 2024	Digital download; streaming	Standard	EMI; Universal Japan	
Japan	December 25, 2024	CD; CD+Blu-ray	Standard; limited; official shop	EMI; Universal Japan	

== See also ==
- List of Billboard Japan Hot Albums number ones of 2025
- List of Oricon number-one albums of 2025
