= List of Billboard Japan Hot Albums number ones of 2015 =

The following is a list of weekly number-one albums on the Billboard Japan Hot Albums chart in 2015.

== Chart history ==
Issue date	Album	Artist(s)	Ref.
June 8	White (Superfly album)	Superfly (band)	
June 15	REFLECTION	Mr. Children	
June 22	Genic	Namie Amuro	
June 29	REFLECTION	Mr. Children	
July 6	JUMPing Car	Hey! Say! JUMP	
July 13	KIS-MY-WORLD	Kis-My-Ft2	
July 20	Dreams Come True The Best! Watashi no Dorikamu (DREAMS COME TRUE THE BEST! 私のドリカム)	Dreams Come True (band)	
July 27	Dreams Come True The Best! Watashi no Dorikamu (DREAMS COME TRUE THE BEST! 私のドリカム)	Dreams Come True (band)	
August 3	Dreams Come True The Best! Watashi no Dorikamu (DREAMS COME TRUE THE BEST! 私のドリカム)	Dreams Come True (band)	
August 10	SUPER Very best	V6 (band)	
August 17	Dreams Come True The Best! Watashi no Dorikamu (DREAMS COME TRUE THE BEST! 私のドリカム)	Dreams Come True (band)	
August 24	Dreams Come True The Best! Watashi no Dorikamu (DREAMS COME TRUE THE BEST! 私のドリカム)	Dreams Come True (band)	
August 31	Dreams Come True The Best! Watashi no Dorikamu (DREAMS COME TRUE THE BEST! 私のドリカム)	Dreams Come True (band)	
September 7	Dreams Come True The Best! Watashi no Dorikamu (DREAMS COME TRUE THE BEST! 私のドリカム)	Dreams Come True (band)	
September 14	Yasou Emaki (八奏絵巻)	Wagakki Band	
September 21	Futari Sankaku 2015.8.15 〜 Midori no hi 〜 (二人参客 2015.8.15〜緑の日〜)	Yuzu (band)	
September 28	AAA 10th Anniversary Best	AAA (band)	
October 5	Singles (Maroon 5 album)	Maroon 5	
October 12	Singles (Maroon 5 album)	Maroon 5	
October 19	Bremen (album)	Kenshi Yonezu	
October 26	Ace of Angels (album)	AOA (group)	
November 2	Japonism (album)	Arashi	
November 9	Japonism (album)	Arashi	
November 16	1 (Beatles album)	The Beatles	
November 23	Kanjani8 no Genki ga Deru CD!! (関ジャニ∞の元気が出るCD!!)	Kanjani Eight	
November 30	0 to 1 no Aida	AKB48	
December 7	Love Letter	Jun. K	
December 14	Yellow Dancer	Gen Hoshino	
December 21	Chandelier (シャンデリア)	Back Number	
December 28	Chandelier (シャンデリア)	Back Number	

== See also ==
- List of Hot 100 number-one singles of 2015
