= List of Billboard Japan Hot Albums number ones of 2017 =

The following is a list of weekly number-one albums on the Billboard Japan Hot Albums chart in 2017.

== Chart history ==
Issue date	Album	Artist(s)	Ref.
January 2	SMAP 25 Years	SMAP	
January 9	Encore	Back Number	
January 16	Encore	Back Number	
January 23	Ambitions (One Ok Rock album)	One Ok Rock	
January 30	E.G. Crazy	E-girls	
February 6	Thumbnail (album) (サムネイル)	AKB48	
February 13	Encore	Back Number	
February 20	Encore	Back Number	
February 27	Made (Big Bang album)	Big Bang (band)	
March 6	Way of Glory	AAA (band)	
March 13	BORN TO BE WILD	Exile The Second	
March 20	La La Land (soundtrack)	Various Artists	
March 27	Mabataki (まばたき)	Yuki (singer)	
April 3	Neverland	NEWS (band)	
April 10	The JSB World	Sandaime J Soul Brothers	
April 17	The JSB World	Sandaime J Soul Brothers	
April 24	D-Day (D-Lite EP)	Daesung	
May 1	Koichi Domoto 「Endless SHOCK」 Original Sound Track 2	Koichi Domoto	
May 8	Yuzu Iroha [1997–2017] (ゆずイロハ1997–2017)	Yuzu (band)	
May 15	Music Colosseum	Kis-My-Ft2	
May 22	Mr. Children 1992-2002 Thanksgiving 25	Mr. Children	
May 29	Mr. Children 1992-2002 Thanksgiving 25	Mr. Children	
June 5	Umarete kara Hajimete Mita Yume (生まれてから初めて見た夢)	Nogizaka46	
June 12	Ebicracy (エビクラシー)	Shiritsu Ebisu Chugaku	
June 19	Kwon Ji Yong	G-Dragon	
June 26	All Time Best Hata Motohiro (All Time Best ハタモトヒロ)	Motohiro Hata	
July 3	Acid BLOOD Cherry	Acid Black Cherry	
July 10	Jam (ジャム)	Kanjani Eight	
July 17	CYCLE HIT 1991〜2017 Spitz Complete Single Collection -30th Anniversary BOX-	Spitz (band)	
July 24	Summerdelics	Glay	
July 31	Masshiro na Mono wa Yogoshitaku naru (真っ白なものは汚したくなる)	Sakurazaka46	
August 7	Hey! Say! JUMP 2007-2017 I/O	Hey! Say! JUMP	
August 14	Namba Ai: Ima, Omou Koto	NMB48	
August 21	The Ones	V6 (band)	
August 28	Black Train	Tsuyoshi Nagabuchi	
September 4	Garakuta (がらくた)	Keisuke Kuwata	
September 11	Blackpink (EP)	Blackpink	
September 18	Garakuta (がらくた)	Keisuke Kuwata	
September 25	Garakuta (がらくた)	Keisuke Kuwata	
October 2	REGALITY	TRIGGER	
October 9	The Best (Ariana Grande album)	Ariana Grande	
October 16	The Gift	Hi-Standard	
October 23	The Dream Quest	Dreams Come True (band)	
October 30	Untitled (Arashi album)	Arashi	
November 6	Fine Collection: Begin Again	TVXQ	
November 13	Bootleg (Kenshi Yonezu album)	Kenshi Yonezu	
November 20	Finally (Namie Amuro album)	Namie Amuro	
November 27	Finally (Namie Amuro album)	Namie Amuro	
December 4	Finally (Namie Amuro album)	Namie Amuro	
December 11	Dinosaur (B'z album)	B'z	
December 18	The Best	KinKi Kids	
December 25	Michishirube (舞祭組の、わっ!)	Busaiku	

== See also ==
- List of Hot 100 number-one singles of 2017
