= List of Billboard Japan Hot Albums number ones of 2016 =

The following is a list of weekly number-one albums on the Billboard Japan Hot Albums chart in 2016.

== Chart history ==
| Issue date | Album | Artist(s) | Ref. |
|---|---|---|---|
| January 4 | Fuku no Oto (福の音) | Masaharu Fukuyama | |
| January 11 | Fuku no Oto (福の音) | Masaharu Fukuyama | |
| January 18 | Utamonogatari (歌物語) | Various Artists | |
| January 25 | Ryōseibai (両成敗) | Gesu no Kiwami Otome | |
| February 1 | Chandelier (シャンデリア) | Back Number | |
| February 8 | YAMA-P | Tomohisa Yamashita | |
| February 15 | Made Series | Big Bang (band) | |
| February 22 | Butterflies (Bump of Chicken album) | Bump of Chicken | |
| February 29 | Hakkin no Yoake (白金の夜明け) | Momoiro Clover Z | |
| March 7 | Welcome to Sexy Zone | Sexy Zone | |
| March 14 | Speedster (album) | Generations from Exile Tribe | |
| March 21 | Quartetto | NEWS (band) | |
| March 28 | Chō Ikimonobakari: Ten-nen Kinen Members BEST Selection (超いきものばかり〜てんねん記念メンバーズBESTセレクション〜) | Ikimonogakari | |
| April 4 | 10TH ANNIVERSARY BEST "10Ks!" | KAT-TUN | |
| April 11 | The JSB Legacy | Sandaime J Soul Brothers | |
| April 18 | Cosmic Explorer | Perfume (Japanese band) | |
| April 25 | L'épilogue | Kyosuke Himuro | |
| May 2 | Ano Hi Ano Toki (あの日 あの時) | Kazumasa Oda | |
| May 9 | Galaxy of 2PM | 2PM | |
| May 16 | Ano Hi Ano Toki (あの日 あの時) | Kazumasa Oda | |
| May 23 | 2020 -T.M.Revolution All Time Best- | T.M.Revolution | |
| May 30 | May Dream | Aiko (Japanese singer) | |
| June 6 | Sorezore no Isu (それぞれの椅子) | Nogizaka46 | |
| June 13 | THE IDOLM@STER CINDERELLA MASTER Cute jewelries! 003 | Various Artists | |
| June 20 | Grateful Rebirth | Tsuyoshi Domoto | |
| June 27 | HiGH & LOW ORIGINAL BEST ALBUM | Various Artists | |
| July 4 | I SCREAM | Kis-My-Ft2 | |
| July 11 | THE IDOLM@STER CINDERELLA MASTER Cool jewelries! 003 | Various Artists | |
| July 18 | Walkure Attack! | Walküre | |
| July 25 | Just Love (Kana Nishino album) | Kana Nishino | |
| August 1 | Just Love (Kana Nishino album) | Kana Nishino | |
| August 8 | Dear (Hey! Say! JUMP album) | Hey! Say! JUMP | |
| August 15 | Just Love (Kana Nishino album) | Kana Nishino | |
| August 22 | Just Love (Kana Nishino album) | Kana Nishino | |
| August 29 | Just Love (Kana Nishino album) | Kana Nishino | |
| September 5 | Your Name (album) (君の名は。) | Radwimps | |
| September 12 | Your Name (album) (君の名は。) | Radwimps | |
| September 19 | Your Name (album) (君の名は。) | Radwimps | |
| September 26 | Your Name (album) (君の名は。) | Radwimps | |
| October 3 | N album | KinKi Kids | |
| October 10 | Fantôme (album) | Hikaru Utada | |
| October 17 | Fantôme (album) | Hikaru Utada | |
| October 24 | Fantôme (album) | Hikaru Utada | |
| October 31 | Fantôme (album) | Hikaru Utada | |
| November 7 | Are You Happy? | Arashi | |
| November 14 | Are You Happy? | Arashi | |
| November 21 | EXIST! | Alexandros (band) | |
| November 28 | Sexy Zone 5th Anniversary Best | Sexy Zone | |
| December 5 | Human Bloom (人間開花) | Radwimps | |
| December 12 | Nawest (なうぇすと) | Johnny's West | |
| December 19 | Human Bloom (人間開花) | Radwimps | |
| December 26 | Ifuudoudou -B.M.C.A.- (威風堂々〜B.M.C.A.〜) | Boys and Men | |

== See also ==
- List of Hot 100 number-one singles of 2016
