= I'm Invincible =

Single by Ado

from the album Uta's Songs: One Piece Film Red
- Language: Japanese
- Released: June 22, 2022
- Genre: Pop rock; orchestral
- Length: 4:17
- Label: Virgin
- Songwriter: Motoki Ohmori
- Producer: Mrs. Green Apple

Ado singles chronology
"New Genesis" (2021)	"I'm Invincible" (2022)	"Backlight" (2022)

Music video
- "I'm Invincible" on YouTube

"I'm Invincible" (Japanese: 私は最強, Hepburn: Watashi wa Saikyō; alternatively titled "I'm Invincible (Uta from One Piece Film Red)", stylized in sentence case) is a song recorded by Japanese singer Ado, released on June 22, 2022, by Virgin Music. Written and produced by Motoki Ohmori of Mrs. Green Apple, the song served as the second single from the 2022 soundtrack album, Uta's Songs: One Piece Film Red.

Upon its release, "I'm Invincible" peaked at number 3 on the Oricon Combined Singles Chart and number 2 on the Billboard Japan Hot 100. Globally, "I'm Invincible" peaked at number 74 on the Billboard Global 200.

== Background ==
On June 8, 2022, the cast for the upcoming film, One Piece Film: Red was revealed. Amongst the cast, Ado was revealed as the singing voice actress for the character Uta while Kaori Nazuka reprised her role for Uta's non-singing parts. Shortly after, Ado released "New Genesis", the image song for the film. Shortly after its release, a new single was announced with lyrics and production by Mrs. Green Apple. The music video for the single subsequently was announced for release on June 22.

== Commercial performance ==
"I'm Invincible" debuted at number 21 on the Billboard Japan Hot 100. On the Billboard Japan Hot Animation chart, the song debuted at number 5. On the Oricon Digital Singles Chart, "I'm Invincible" debuted at number 8.

Following the release of Uta's Songs: One Piece Film Red in August, "I'm Invincible" reached a new peak on both the Billboard Japan and Oricon charts. On the Japan Hot Animation chart, "I'm Invincible" peaked at number 2. On the Oricon chart, "I'm Invincible" peaked at number 2 on the Digital Singles Chart and number 3 on the Combined Singles Chart. Near the end of September, "I'm Invincible" peaked at number 2 on the Billboard Japan Hot 100. The song later received a Platinum streaming certification from the Recording Industry Association of Japan (RIAJ).

== Covers ==
Mrs. Green Apple self-covered "I'm Invincible", which was included as a B-side on their single "Soranji", and later on their fifth studio album Antenna.

== Personnel ==
Credits adapted from Tidal.

- Ado – vocals
- Motoki Ohmori – songwriting, electric guitar, programming
- Mrs. Green Apple – production, recording arrangement
- Junya Kondo – alto saxophone
- Shuhei Ito – cello
- Sonoko Muraoka – cello
- Hideyuki Karakazu – drums
- Natsuhiko Mori – electric bass
- Hiroto Wakai – electric guitar
- Ken Ito – horn arrangement, string arrangement
- Ryoka Fujisawa – piano
- Hideyuki Kurakazu – tambourine, triangle
- Nobuhide Handa – trombone
- Tatsuhiko Yoshizawa – trumpet
- Mei Mishina – viola
- Sumire Segawa – viola
- Anzu Suhara – violin
- Daisuke Yamamoto – violin
- Honoka Sato – violin
- Kon Shirasu – violin
- Sena Oshima – violin
- Shino Miwa – violin
- Tsukasa Nagura – violin
- Yuki Nakajima – violin

== Charts ==
=== Weekly charts ===
Weekly chart performance for "I'm Invincible"
Chart (2022)	Peak position
Global 200 (Billboard)	74
Japan (Japan Hot 100)	2
Japan Hot Animation (Billboard Japan)	2
Japan Combined Singles (Oricon)	3

=== Year-end charts ===
2022 year-end chart performance for "I'm Invincible"
Chart (2022)	Position
Japan (Japan Hot 100)	24
Japan Hot Animation (Billboard Japan)	8

2023 year-end chart performance for "I'm Invincible"
Chart (2023)	Position
Japan (Japan Hot 100)	27
Japan Hot Animation (Billboard Japan)	10

== Certifications ==
Certifications and sales for "I'm Invincible"
Region	Certification	Certified units/sales
Japan (RIAJ) Single track	Gold	100,000^{*}
Japan (RIAJ) Streaming	3× Platinum	300,000,000^{†}
^{*} Sales figures based on certification alone.^{†} Streaming-only figures based on certification alone.

== Release history ==
Release history and formats for "I'm Invincible"
Region	Date	Format	Label	Ref.
Various	June 22, 2022	Digital download; streaming	Virgin; Universal	
