= Unity (Mrs. Green Apple EP) =

2022 EP by Mrs. Green Apple

EP by Mrs. Green Apple
- Released: July 7, 2022
- Length: 24:55
- Language: Japanese
- Label: EMI
- Producer: Motoki Ohmori

Mrs. Green Apple chronology
5 (2020)	Unity (2022)	Antenna (2023)

Singles from Unity
- 1. "New My Normal" Released: March 18, 2022; 2. "Dance Hall" Released: May 24, 2022; 3. "Blue Ambience" Released: June 13, 2022

Unity is the fourth extended play by Japanese rock band Mrs. Green Apple. It was released digitally on July 7, 2022, and physically on July 8, by EMI Records.

== Background and release ==
On July 8, 2020, with the fifth anniversary of Mrs. Green Apple's major label debut and the release of their compilation album 5, the band announced the "completion of phase one" and a hiatus. They also announced their independence from their agency and a new project "Project-MGA", in collaboration with Universal Music Group, which launched on February 4, 2021.

Vocalist Motoki Ohmori made his solo debut on February 24, 2021, with his debut EP French, and released a second EP Midnight on August 6. Mrs. Green Apple released a teaser video on July 8 announcing that "phase two" would begin in 2022. On December 30, the band announced the departure of drummer Ayaka Yamanaka and bassist Kiyokazu Takano from the group.

On March 14, 2022, Mrs. Green Apple released their new logo in a video that was broadcast outside Shibuya Station and at Shibuya Crossing. They released "New My Normal" as a limited edition single on March 18, with the music video premiering the same day. On the same day they announced that they would be releasing an extended play on July 8 holding a one-night arena performance. Concept photos and comments from the members were also released. The group released the title and jacket of the EP on May 12, and the track listing on May 20.

On March 28, "Dance Hall" was announced as the theme song for Fuji TV's information program Mezamashi 8. "Blue Ambience" was featured on Abema's reality show Today, I Fell in Love: First Rainbow Collection on the same day. On May 17, "Enen" was announced as the theme song for the video game Fire Force: Enbu no Shō, the band's second song for Fire Force after "Inferno" for the anime. "Dance Hall" was released as a single on May 24, and "Blue Ambience" was released as a single on June 13.

== Track listing ==
All tracks are written by Motoki Ohmori.

Unity track listing
No.	Title	Arrangement	Length
1.	"New My Normal" (ニュー・マイ・ノーマル)	Mrs. Green Apple; Yōsuke Yamashita	4:04
2.	"Dance Hall" (ダンスホール)	Ohmori; Shingo Kubota (Jazzin' park)	3:23
3.	"Blue Ambience" (featuring Asmi) (ブルーアンビエンス)	Ohmori; Yamashita	4:11
4.	"Kimi wo Shiranai" (君を知らない)	Ohmori; Ryō Hanai	4:08
5.	"Enen" (延々)	Ohmori; Hanai	3:36
6.	"Part of Me"	Hanai; Ohmori	5:33
Total length:			24:55

DVD bonus
No.	Title	Director	Length
1.	"New My Normal" (music video)	Hidenobu Tanabe
2.	"Documentary – The Beginning of Phase-2"	Kazuaki Kimura

== Charts ==
=== Weekly charts ===
Weekly chart performance for Unity
Chart (2022)	Peak position
Japanese Albums (Oricon)	3
Japanese Combined Albums (Oricon)	2
Japanese Rock Albums (Oricon)	1
Japanese Hot Albums (Billboard Japan)	2

=== Monthly charts ===
Monthly chart performance for Unity
Chart (2022)	Position
Japanese Albums (Oricon)	15
Japanese Rock Albums (Oricon)	1

=== Year-end charts ===
2022 year-end chart performance for Unity
Chart (2022)	Position
Japanese Albums (Oricon)	91
Japanese Hot Albums (Billboard Japan)	79

2023 year-end chart performance for Unity
Chart (2023)	Position
Japanese Download Albums (Billboard Japan)	93

2025 year-end chart performance for Unity
Chart (2025)	Position
Japanese Hot Albums (Billboard Japan)	29
