= List of Billboard Japan Hot Albums number ones of 2020 =

The following is a list of weekly number-one albums on the Billboard Japan Hot Albums chart in 2020.

== Chart history ==
| Issue date | Song | Artist(s) | Ref. |
|---|---|---|---|
| January 6 | Buster Bros!!! -Before the 2nd D.R.B- | Buster Bros!!! | |
| January 13 | 20200101 | Shingo Katori | |
| January 20 | Go with the Flow | Takuya Kimura | |
| January 27 | Ceremony | King Gnu | |
| February 3 | Ceremony | King Gnu | |
| February 10 | Mad Trigger Crew -Before the 2nd D.R.B- | Mad Trigger Crew | |
| February 17 | Pop × Step!? | Sexy Zone | |
| February 24 | Bright New World | Little Glee Monster | |
| March 2 | AAA 15th Anniversary All Time Best -thanx AAA lot- | AAA | |
| March 9 | Map of the Soul: 7 | BTS | |
| March 16 | Story | NEWS | |
| March 23 | Review II ～Best of Glay～ | Glay | |
| March 30 | W Trouble | Johnny's West | |
| April 6 | To-y2 | Kis-My-Ft2 | |
| April 13 | Man with a "B-Sides & Covers" Mission | Man with a Mission | |
| April 20 | Your Story | Juju | |
| April 27 | Maximum Huavo | Inaba/Salas | |
| May 4 | Our Best | Jin Akanishi | |
| May 11 | Suck My World | The Oral Cigarettes | |
| May 18 | Your Story | Juju | |

== See also ==
- List of Hot 100 number-one singles of 2020
