= Antenna (Mrs. Green Apple album) =

2023 studio album by Mrs. Green Apple

Studio album by Mrs. Green Apple
- Released: July 4, 2023
- Length: 53:32
- Language: Japanese
- Label: EMI
- Producer: Motoki Ohmori

Mrs. Green Apple chronology
Unity (2022)	Antenna (2023)	10 (2025)

Singles from Antenna
- 1. "Soranji" Released: November 9, 2022; 2. "Que Sera Sera" Released: April 25, 2023; 3. "Magic" Released: June 13, 2023

Antenna is the fifth studio album by Japanese rock band Mrs. Green Apple. It was released digitally on July 4, 2023, and physically on July 5 under EMI Records. It debuted at number two on the Oricon Albums Chart.

== Background and release ==
On March 30, 2023, it was announced that Mrs. Green Apple's fifth album Antenna would be released on July 5. The digital single "Que Sera Sera" from the album was released on April 25 as the theme song for At Least on Sunday Night, with the music video premiering later that day. The song was also used to promote Spotify. Concept photos for the album were released on May 13 and 26, and the album jacket was released on May 27. On May 30, it was announced that "Magic" would be released on June 13 to promote Coca-Cola, with the release of the music video on the same day. The tracklist for the album was released on June 12, including "Que Sera Sera" and "Magic", as well as "Soranji", released as the theme song for the film Fragments of the Last Will, and "I'm Invincible", a cover of Ado's song of the same name, written and produced by Mrs. Green Apple vocalist Motoki Ohmori, from the soundtrack of One Piece Film: Red.

The album was released digitally on July 4 prior to its physical release the day later. Four versions of the album were released: regular, first limited edition, limited production edition, and "Jam's Box", which was limited to members of the band's fan club. The Jam's Box version contained merchandise including those supervised by the band members. Additionally, the DVD and Blu-ray included with the limited editions and Jam's Box contains a 150-minute documentary covering the production process of the album.

Regarding the album name, vocalist Motoki Ohmori stated that the meaning of sensitivity and desire to include all his feelings in an image made him think "it was beautiful to call it an antenna." He also said that "the moment I thought of the word 'antenna', the whole image of the album became clear to me."

"Doodle" was used to promote Kao's hair care product "Merit". The music video for "Antenna" was released on September 16, and was selected as the Japanese national team's support song for Fuji TV's World Cup Volleyball 2023. The official lyric video for "Unloveless" was released on November 17.

== Track listing ==
All tracks are written by Motoki Ohmori.

Antenna track listing
No.	Title	Arrangement	Length
1.	"Antenna"	Ohmori; Ryō Hanai	4:30
2.	"Magic"	Shingo Kubota (Jazzin' park); Ohmori	4:23
3.	"I'm Invincible" (私は最強)	Mrs. Green Apple; Ken Itō	4:17
4.	"Blizzard"	Ohmori; Shun Suyama	4:22
5.	"Que Sera Sera" (ケセラセラ)	Hanai; Ohmori	4:32
6.	"Soranji"	Ohmori; EFFY	5:43
7.	"Unloveless" (アンラブレス)	Ohmori; Yōsuke Yamashita	2:47
8.	"Loneliness"	D&H (Purple Night); Ohmori	3:49
9.	"Norn"	Ohmori; Hanai	3:48
10.	"Daidai" (橙)	Ohmori; Hanai	4:19
11.	"Doodle"	Ohmori; Yamashita	4:05
12.	"BFF"	Ohmori; Yamashita	4:33
13.	"Feeling"	Kubota; Ohmori	2:24
Total length:			53:32

DVD and Blu-ray bonus
No.	Title	Director	Length
1.	"Documentary — Episode 3 "Antenna""	Hikaru Sano

== Charts ==
=== Weekly charts ===
Weekly chart performance for Antenna
Chart (2023–2025)	Peak position
Japanese Albums (Oricon)	2
Japanese Combined Albums (Oricon)	1
Japanese Rock Albums (Oricon)	1
Japanese Hot Albums (Billboard Japan)	1

=== Monthly charts ===
Monthly chart performance for Antenna
Chart (2023)	Position
Japanese Albums (Oricon)	6
Japanese Rock Albums (Oricon)	1

=== Year-end charts ===
2023 year-end chart performance for Antenna
Chart (2023)	Position
Japanese Albums (Oricon)	36
Japanese Digital Albums (Oricon)	7
Japanese Hot Albums (Billboard Japan)	27

2024 year-end chart performance for Antenna
Chart (2024)	Position
Japanese Albums (Oricon)	46
Japanese Combined Albums (Oricon)	6
Japanese Hot Albums (Billboard Japan)	38

2025 year-end chart performance for Antenna
Chart (2025)	Position
Japanese Albums (Oricon)	86
Japanese Hot Albums (Billboard Japan)	2

== Certifications ==
Certifications for Antenna
Region	Certification	Certified units/sales
Japan (RIAJ)	Gold	100,000^{^}
^{^} Shipments figures based on certification alone.
