= Uta's Songs: One Piece Film Red =

- Standard cover

Soundtrack album by Ado
- Released: August 10, 2022
- Studios: Victor Studio (Shibuya); HeartBeat (Setagaya); Sound City (Tokyo); Onkio Haus (Ginza)
- Genres: Anison; J-pop; pop rock
- Length: 30:53
- Label: Virgin
- Producers: Yasutaka Nakata; Motoki Ohmori; Vaundy; Fake Type; Hiroyuki Sawano; Yuta Orisaka; Motohiro Hata; Nishi-ken

Ado chronology
Kyōgen (2022)	Uta's Songs: One Piece Film Red (2022)	Ado's Utattemita Album (2023)

Singles from Uta's Songs: One Piece Film Red
- 1. "New Genesis" Released: June 8, 2022; 2. "I'm Invincible" Released: June 22, 2022; 3. "Backlight" Released: July 6, 2022

Uta's Songs: One Piece Film Red (Note: Japanese: ウタの歌 One Piece Film Red, romanized: Uta no Uta One Piece Film Red) is a soundtrack album by Japanese singer Ado, released on August 10, 2022, by Virgin Music. The album accompanies the 2022 Japanese animated film, One Piece Film: Red. The album was preceded by three singles: "New Genesis", "I'm Invincible" and "Backlight", all of which charted within the top 5 of the Billboard Japan Hot 100 and the top 80 of the Billboard Global 200.

Upon its release, Uta's Songs: One Piece Film Red debuted and peaked at number 1 on the Oricon Combined Albums Chart and on the Billboard Japan Hot Albums chart and number 2 on the Oricon Albums Chart. Following the global success of the album, Ado signed a record deal with Geffen Records.

== Background ==
Ado previously released her debut studio album, Kyōgen, in January 2022. The album broke previously set records in Japan, most notably becoming the first debut studio album by a solo female artist to debut at number one since Miwa's 2011 album, Guitarissimo.

On June 8, the cast for the upcoming film, One Piece Film: Red was revealed. Amongst the cast, Ado was revealed as the singing voice actress for the character Uta while Kaori Nazuka reprised her role for Uta's non-singing parts. A single titled "New Genesis" was announced for release later that month. Shortly after, a press release reported that Mrs. Green Apple, Vaundy, Fake Type, Hiroyuki Sawano and Yuta Orisaka were amongst those announced providing songs for the soundtrack album. On June 15, the album art was revealed, drawn by Eiichiro Oda. "New Genesis" topped Apple Music's Top 100: Global playlist, a first for a Japanese song. Shortly after the release of "New Genesis", a second single titled "I'm Invincible" was announced alongside its music video, which was released on June 22. The third and final single "Backlight" was released on July 6, 2022. "Fleeting Lullaby" later was released as a promotional single, days before the release of the album.

== Release ==
Uta's Songs: One Piece Red was released on August 10, 2022. Alongside the standard version of the album, a limited DVD and first press version was released in Japan on the same day, the latter containing two bonus remixes and three music videos. Shortly after Ado signed with Geffen Records, Decca Records began to sell copies of the standard version of Uta's Songs: One Piece Film Red in the United Kingdom. Geffen later announced they would physically release the album globally on December 16.

== Critical reception ==
Uta's Songs: One Piece Film Red was met with positive reviews from critics. Just Lunning of IGN praised Ado's versatility, stating the album "allow[ed] Ado to show off her fantastic tonal range." Gizmodo commented that "nearly all of [the songs] will be an earworm for some time, and some of the final songs may end up being tearjerkers for viewers."

== Commercial performance ==
=== Japan ===
Uta's Songs: One Piece Film Red debuted and peaked at number one on the Billboard Japan Hot Albums chart and the Oricon Combined Albums chart. In physical sales, the album debuted and peaked at number two on the Oricon Albums Chart. For the month of August, the album debuted and peaked at number two on the monthly Oricon Albums chart. Within one month, Uta's Songs: One Piece Film Red received a Platinum certification from the Recording Industry Association of Japan.

The album broke multiple records on the Billboard Japan and Oricon charts. For the first time in Billboard Japan history, Ado became the first artist to have three songs simultaneously on the top 3 of the Japan Hot 100. Ado later broke her own record, having five songs from the album chart in the top 5 of Japan Hot 100. On the Oricon charts, Ado became the first artist in Oricon history to have five songs chart in the top 5 of the Streaming chart.

=== Americas ===
Following the release of the film in North America in November 2022, Uta's Songs: One Piece Film Red debuted at number 9 on the Billboard Heatseekers Albums chart and number 7 on the World Albums chart. Spotify reported that streams of the One Piece Film: Red playlist rose 32.7 times in the United States.

=== Europe ===
In Belgium, Uta's Songs: One Piece Film Red debuted and peaked at number 168 on the Ultratop Wallonia charts. In France, the album debuted and peaked at number 97. In Spain, Uta's Songs: One Piece Film Red debuted and peaked at number 95.

== Track listing ==
Uta's Songs: One Piece Film Red track listing
No.	Title	Lyrics	Music	Producer(s)	Length
1.	"New Genesis" (新時代, Shin Jidai)	Yasutaka Nakata	Nakata	Nakata	3:49
2.	"I'm Invincible" (私は最強, Watashi wa Saikyō)	Motoki Ohmori	Mrs. Green Apple	Ohmori	4:17
3.	"Backlight" (逆光, Gyakkō)	Vaundy	Vaundy	Vaundy	3:57
4.	"Fleeting Lullaby" (ウタカタララバイ, Utakata Rarabai)	Tophamhat-kyo	Fake Type.	Fake Type.	2:53
5.	"Tot Musica"	Canon	Hiroyuki Sawano	Sawano	3:16
6.	"The World's Continuation" (世界のつづき, Sekai no Tsuzuki)	Yuta Orisaka	Orisaka	Orisaka	4:48
7.	"Where the Wind Blows" (風のゆくえ, Kaze no Yukue)	Motohiro Hata	Hata	Hata	4:33
8.	"Binks' Sake" (ビンクスの酒, Binkusu no Sake)	Eiichiro Oda	Kohei Tanaka	Nishi-ken	3:27
Total length:					30:53

Limited edition bonus track listing
No.	Title	Length
9.	"Where the Wind Blows" (Child version)
10.	"The World's Continuation" (Youth version)

Limited edition DVD bonus
No.	Title	Length
1.	"New Genesis" (lyric video)
2.	"I'm Invincible" (lyric video)
3.	"Backlight" (lyric video)

Apple Music video edition
No.	Title	Length
9.	"New Genesis" (lyric video)
10.	"I'm Invincible" (lyric video)
11.	"Backlight" (lyric video)
12.	"Fleeting Lullaby" (lyric video)
13.	"Tot Musica" (lyric video)
14.	"The World's Continuation" (lyric video)
15.	"Where the Wind Blows" (lyric video)

== Personnel ==
Credits adapted from Tidal.

Musicians

- Ado – vocals
- Keisuke Oyama – background vocals
- Kenta Isohi – background vocals
- Mayumi Watanabe – background vocals
- Mika Akiba – background vocals
- Sak – background vocals
- Shiori Sasaki – background vocals
- Yasutaka Nakata – songwriting, production
- Motoki Ohmori – songwriting, production
- Shuhei Ito – cello
- Sonoko Muraoka – cello
- Hideyuki Kurakazu – drums, triangle, tambourine
- Natsuhiko Mori – electric bass
- Ken Ito – horn arrangement
- Ryoka Fujisawa – piano
- Ken Ito – string arrangement
- Nobuhide Handa – trombone
- Tatsuhiko Yoshizawa – trombone
- Mei Mishina – viola
- Sumire Segawa – viola
- Anzu Suhara – violin
- Daisuke Yamamoto – violin
- Honoka Sato – violin
- Kon Shirasu – violin
- Sena Oshima – violin
- Shino Miwa – violin
- Tsukasa Nagura – violin
- Yuki Nakajima – violin
- Johngarabushi – guitar
- Toshino Tanabe – bass
- Makoto Fujisaki – drums
- Hiroshi Iimuro – guitar
- Hiroyuki Sawano – production, songwriting, keyboard, piano
- Daisuke Kawaguichi – piano
- Erika Aoyama – strings
- Hiroomi Shitara – acoustic guitar
- Yu Suto – bass
- Noriyasu "Kaasuke" Kawamura – drums
- Hideyo Takakuwa – flute
- Tomoyuki Asakawa – harp
- Otohiko Fujita – horn
- Tomoyo Shoji – horn
- Satoshi Shoji – oboe
- Ryoichi Kayatani – percussion
- Tomi Yo – piano
- Hideyo Takakuwa – piccolo
- Koichiro Muroya – strings
- Toshiyuki Muranaka – cello
- Nishi-ken – production, piano
- Daisuke Kadowaki – string arrangement, violin
- Sena Oshima – viola
- Daisuke Yamato – violin
- Yasutaka Nakata – production, songwriting
- Vaundy – production, songwriting
- Uechang – bass
- Bobo – drums
- Taking – guitar
- FAKE TYPE. – production, songwriting
- TOPHAMHAT-KYO – songwriting
- Canon – songwriting
- Yuta Orisaka – production, songwriting
- Motohiro Hata – production, songwriting
- Kohei Tanaka – songwriting
- Eiichiro Oda – songwriting
- Junya Kondo – alto saxophone

Technical

- Yasutaka Nakata – recording arrangement
- Ken Ito – recording arrangement
- Mrs. Green Apple – recording arrangement
- Vaundy – recording arrangement
- Dyes Iwasaki – recording arrangement
- Hiroyuki Sawano – recording arrangement
- Daisukue Kawaguchi – programming, recording arrangement
- Motohiro Hata – recording arrangement
- Tomi Yo – recording arrangement
- Nishi-ken – recording arrangement

== Charts ==
=== Weekly charts ===
Weekly chart performance for Uta's Songs: One Piece Film Red
Chart (2022)	Peak position
Belgian Albums (Ultratop Wallonia)	168
French Albums (SNEP)	97
Japanese Albums (Oricon)	2
Japanese Combined Albums (Oricon)	1
Japanese Hot Albums (Billboard Japan)	1
Spanish Albums (Promusicae)	95
UK Soundtrack Albums (Official Charts)	20
US Heatseekers Albums (Billboard)	9
US Top Current Album Sales (Billboard)	82
US World Albums (Billboard)	7

=== Monthly charts ===
Monthly chart performance for Uta's Songs: One Piece Film Red
Chart (2022)	Peak position
Japanese Albums (Oricon)	2

=== Year-end charts ===
2022 year-end chart performance for Uta's Songs: One Piece Film Red
Chart (2022)	Position
Japanese Albums (Oricon)	10
Japanese Combined Albums (Oricon)	3
Japanese Hot Albums (Billboard Japan)	3

2023 year-end chart performance for Uta's Songs: One Piece Film Red
Chart (2023)	Position
Japanese Albums (Oricon)	68
Japanese Hot Albums (Billboard Japan)	45

2024 year-end chart performance for Uta's Songs: One Piece Film Red
Chart (2024)	Position
Japanese Download Albums (Billboard Japan)	32

2025 year-end chart performance for Uta's Songs: One Piece Film Red
Chart (2025)	Position
Japanese Hot Albums (Billboard Japan)	54

== Certifications ==
Certifications and sales for Uta's Songs: One Piece Film Red
Region	Certification	Certified units/sales
Japan (RIAJ)	Platinum	250,000^{^}
^{^} Shipments figures based on certification alone.

== Release history ==
Release history and formats for Uta's Songs: One Piece Film Red
Region	Date	Format(s)	Version	Label	Ref.
Various	August 10, 2022	Digital download; streaming	Standard	Virgin; Universal	
Japan	August 10, 2022	CD	Standard	Virgin; Universal Japan	
Japan	August 10, 2022	CD	First Press	Virgin; Universal Japan	
Japan	August 10, 2022	CD; DVD	Limited	Virgin; Universal Japan	
Taiwan	August 12, 2022	CD	Standard	Universal Taiwan	
Taiwan	August 12, 2022	CD; DVD	Limited	Universal Taiwan	
United Kingdom	November 4, 2022	CD	Standard	Decca	
Various	December 16, 2022	CD	Standard	Geffen	
Various	December 16, 2022	CD	First Press	Geffen	
Various	December 16, 2022	CD; DVD	Limited	Geffen	
Japan	June 14, 2023	Vinyl	Standard	Virgin; Universal Japan	
