= Mrs. Green Apple =

Japanese rock music group

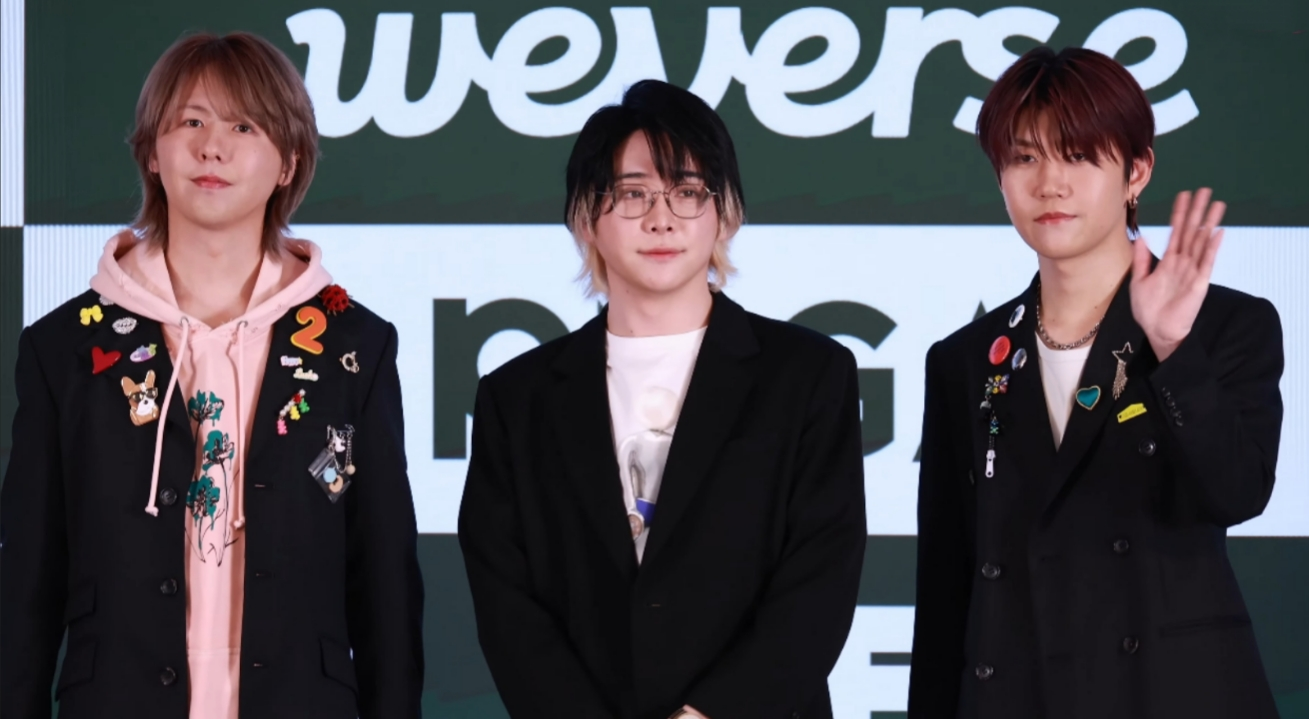
- Mrs. Green Apple in February 2025; From left to right: Fujisawa, Ohmori, Wakai

Background information
- Origin: Tokyo, Japan
- Genres: J-pop; alternative rock; indie pop; pop rock; hard rock
- Years active: 2013–2020; 2022–present
- Labels: EMI; Universal
- Members: Motoki Ohmori; Hiloto Wakai; Ryoka Fujisawa
- Past members: Takumi Matsuo; Ayaka Yamanaka; Kiyokazu Takano
- Website: mrsgreenapple.com

Mrs. Green Apple (stylized as Mrs. GREEN APPLE; Japanese: ミセスグリーンアップル, romanized: Misesu Gurīn Appuru) is a Japanese rock band from Tokyo that made its major debut in 2015 with EMI Records. They are known for performing the fourth ending theme to the anime series Yu-Gi-Oh! Arc-V as well as their first full album, Twelve, which placed 10th on the Japanese national Oricon charts. Their song "Inferno" is used as the opening theme for the first season of the anime Fire Force.

== History ==
=== 2013–2016: Formation and first albums ===
Official logo of Mrs. GREEN APPLE

Singer Motoki Ohmori started creating music when he was in 6th grade, but did not form a band until 2013. Mrs. Green Apple was formed in the spring of 2013 with 4 members: Ohmori, Wakai, and two former members who were a bassist and a drummer. Later, Ohmori invited Fujisawa, and Mrs. Green Apple became a 5-member band.

On February 4, 2014, the band released their demo CD, 1st Demo, at concert venues where they played. The demo included two songs, "リスキーゲーム (Risky Game)" and "恋と吟(うた) (Koi to Uta)." Just a few months later, their first mini album, Introduction, was released at the band's first self-planned event. The gig, held on July 5 at Shibuya LUSH, sold out and was also the place where the former bassist announced that he would leave the band.

2015 marked a huge change for Mrs. Green Apple. On February 18, the band released their first nationally distributed CD, Progressive as an expanded playing. A month later, on March 26, they announced that they would debut from a major label at their third self-planned event, which also sold out. The group's mini album Variety, was released by EMI Records on July 8, 2015. That summer, the group went on to perform at some of the most popular music festivals in Japan, such as Rock in Japan Festival, Rising Sun Rock Festival, and Rush Ball. In December, the group released their first single, "Speaking." The song was chosen as the fourth ending theme song for the anime Yu-Gi-Oh! Arc-V. Mrs. Green Apple released their first full album, Twelve, on January 13, 2016, and made many appearances on television. The group went on their first national one-band tour from March 1 to April 10 of the same year.

=== 2017–2019 ===
The group released their eponymous second album in 2017. The band score of the album was released in June of the same year, the book including photos from a live performance. They also released two singles, "Doko ka de hi wa noboru", and "WanteD! WanteD!". The latter song was the opening theme for the Kansai TV/Fuji TV drama Bokutachi ga Yarimashita, the coupling track, "On My MiND," was written as the opening theme for the anime series Nana Maru San Batsu.

In 2018, the group released two singles, "Love me, Love you" and "Ao to natsu", this one used as theme song for the movie Ao Natsu: Kimi ni Koi Shita Sanju nichi. and the album "Ensemble".

In 2019, they released the singles "Boku no koto", which was the theme song for the 2018 All Japan High School Soccer Tournament, and "Romanticism", as well as the album "Attitude".

=== 2020–2022: Hiatus ===
Following the success of their first ever arena tour, the band announced that they will be releasing a Best Album compilation called "5". The album consisted of remastered tracks from their previous albums, as well as three new songs. It was released worldwide on July 8, 2020, together with the music video for the song "Theater."

Shortly after the release of "5", the band announced the "End of Phase 1", as well as the deactivation of the individual Twitter accounts of each member. The band also published a blog post regarding their end of activities:

Today, as of July 8, 2020, Mrs. Green Apple announces, "the end of Phase 1", and also that the band takes a break for the time being. That does not mean a negative hiatus, but we begin preparations for our new step to the next Phase. At the same time, Mrs. Green Apple is now independent from the ex-management company.

The End of Phase 1 also marked the announcement and start of "Project-MGA", in which the band will be hiring creators and project crew members to join them for their Phase 2. On February 18, 2021, the band announced that vocalist Motoki Ohmori was making his debut as a solo artist. His debut digital EP, "French", was released on February 24 (JST). Later, on December 29, 2021, it was announced that two members of Phase 1 of Mrs. Green Apple, founding member and drummer Ayaka Yamanaka and bassist Kiyokazu Takano would be leaving the group; Fujisawa, Wakai, and Ohmori would remain in the group for Phase 2, set to begin in 2022. A day later, on December 30, it was specified via YouTube video that MGA would officially return Spring 2022.

=== 2024 ===
Ohmori announced on the official website on January 20, 2024 that he had been diagnosed with sudden hearing loss in his left ear, after having problems to listen with it the day before. He added that the group would continue with concerts already announced, while paying attention to any changes, and continuing with any treatment given by doctors.

==== "Columbus" music video controversy ====
In June 2024, Mrs. Green Apple faced significant backlash following the release of the music video for their song "Columbus". The video, which premiered on June 12, depicted the band members dressed as various historical figures, including Christopher Columbus, Napoleon, and Ludwig van Beethoven, interacting with ape-like figures that appeared to be under their control. The depiction quickly drew widespread criticism for being racially insensitive and perpetuating harmful stereotypes.

The controversy ignited on social media, where fans and critics alike condemned the video's imagery. Some interpreted the imagery as offensive, citing the historical context of Christopher Columbus and his association with the colonization and exploitation of indigenous peoples. The use of ape-like characters was particularly controversial, as it evoked racist imagery and stereotypes.

In response to the escalating backlash, Mrs. Green Apple issued a public apology and removed the video from their official YouTube channel the following day. The band explained that their intention was to create a whimsical "fun house party" featuring historical figures and expressed deep regret for any offense caused. They acknowledged that their artistic vision had been misinterpreted and vowed to be more mindful in the future.

Despite the apology, the incident continued to generate discussion and debate. The media, including major platforms such as the BBC, covered the controversy, highlighting broader issues of cultural representation and sensitivity in the arts. Critics emphasized the responsibility of artists to consider the impact of their work on diverse audiences.

Universal Music Japan also apologized, saying in a statement that the video contained "expressions that lack an understanding of history and cultural context." The Japanese division of Coca-Cola announced that it would withdraw all advertisements featuring the song.

=== 2025 ===
Ceremony

On June 18, they held a music festival “Mrs. GREEN APPLE presents "CEREMONY"” in K-Arena Yokohama in Yokohama City, Kanagawa. This was different from general live concerts or any other music festival, but it was an event celebrating cultural fusion. ATEEZ, Hinatazaka 46, HY, Le Sserafim, M!LK, and others performed in this event.

10 Years Anniversary

On July 8, they were 10 years anniversary since their major debut. As a celebration of their anniversary, they released best album “10” as a compilation album. This includes their popular songs that were released after “Phase-2” (2022). For limited edition, movie “Studio Session Live #4” is also included. At same time, they also released their concert “Mrs. Green Apple on Harmony” which was held in 2024 in K-Arena Yokohama as DVD /Blu-ray.They held anniversary talk show at night and they talked about their 10 years history. At that night Tokyo Tower was illuminated by green lights and displayed their logo for celebrating 10 years anniversary. In July, the Tokyo Metropolitan District centered around Shibuya was taken over by a lot of the Mrs. Green Apple’s advertisement. In Miyashita Park, event was also held.

On July 26th and 27th, their anniversary live “MGA MAGICAL 10 YEARS ANNIVERSARY LIVE ~FJORD~” was held in Yamashita Pier in Yokohama City. They performed the song “variety”, which was composed for this concert. This song is to be officially released on 2026 Autumn.

Disney Collaboration

A collaboration project with Tokyo Disney Resort, called "Summer Cool-Off at Tokyo Disney Resort" was scheduled from July 2 to September 15. It includes a theme song, part of which was released on the resort's official YouTube channel. A TV commercial for "Summer Cool-Off at Tokyo Disney Resorts", featuring the theme song by Mrs. Green Apple, was scheduled to be aired in the Chukyo and Kansai areas on June 7, followed by the Tokyo metropolitan area on June 14, and then nationwide. The video of the TV commercial was available on the Tokyo Disney Resort official YouTube channel from 8 a.m., and on the Tokyo Disney Resort special website from 9 a.m., on June 6.

Phase-2 End

On October 16, 2025, Mrs. Green Apple held a major livestream on their official YouTube channel, announcing that Phase 2 would conclude on December 31, 2025, with Phase 3 commencing on January 1, 2026. The band also unveiled an updated image color palette and minor adjustments to their logo, and announced that their sixth studio album is expected to be released in autumn 2026.

=== 2026 ===
Phase-3 Starts

On January 1, the Phase-3 started. Their first performance was TV Music show “CountDown TV LIVE! LIVE!” on Nippon TV which was streamed on January 1st, the first day of Phase-3. Around noon of the first, they had live streaming on their official YouTube channel.

NHK ‘Asadora’ main theme song

On April 13, they released 23rd single “Wind and Town”. This song is written for NHK Asadora (Traditional drama broadcast in the morning) “The Scent of the Wind”.

Song for Spider-Man Brand New Day

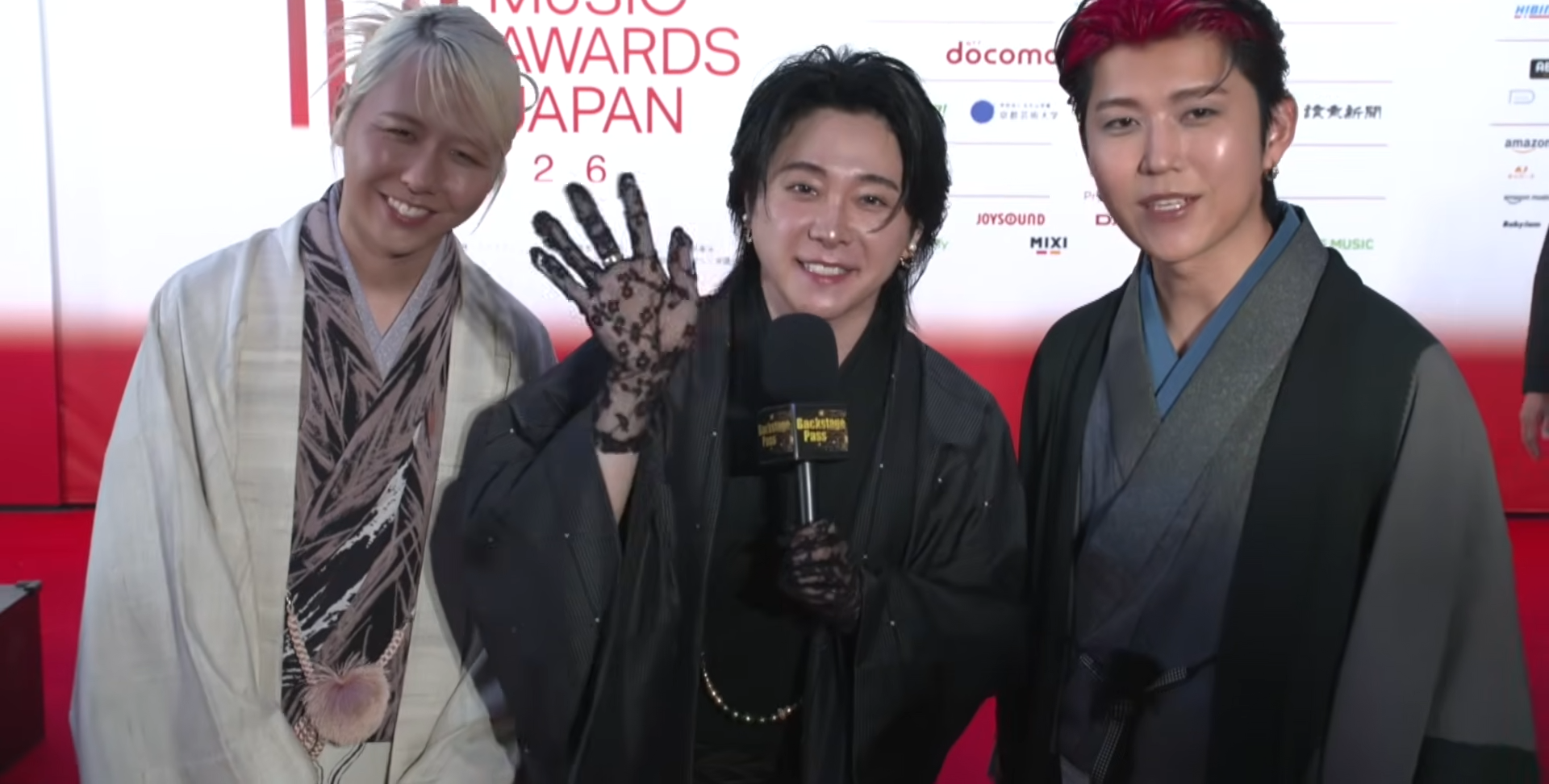
Mrs. Green Apple at the 2026 Music Awards Japan

On July 3rd, it was revealed that Mrs. Green Apple had been hired to create an original song for the Japanese release of the film Spider-Man: Brand New Day, entitled "Brand New”. This song was released on July 13. On July 28th (JST), they attended World Premiere of the Spider Man’s movie that held in Los Angels.They also took the stage on the Red Carpet in the Japan Premiere in Tokyo. On July 31, their original Music Video was released.

== Band members ==
Current members

- Motoki Ohmori (大森元貴, Ōmori Motoki) – vocals, guitar (2013–present)
- Hiloto Wakai (若井滉斗, Wakai Hiroto) – guitar (2013–present)
- Ryoka Fujisawa (藤澤涼架, Fujisawa Ryōka) – keyboards (2013–present)

Former members

- Takumi Matsuo (松尾拓海, Matsuo Takumi) – bass guitar (2013–2014)
- Ayaka Yamanaka (山中綾華, Yamanaka Ayaka) – drums (2013–2021)
- Kiyokazu Takano (髙野清宗, Takano Kiyokazu) – bass guitar (2014–2021)

== Filmography ==
=== Movies (aired in theaters) ===
- The White Lounge (Musical, 2024)
- The Origin (Documentary, 2025)
- MGA MAGICAL 10 YEARS ANNIVERSARY LIVE ～FJORD～ ON SCREEN (Concert recording, 2025)

=== Television ===
==== Variety program ====
- Mrs. School Quest (2023)
- TV x Mrs. (テレビ×ミセス, Terebi × misesu) (2025 as specials, 2026 as regular program)

== Discography ==
=== Studio albums ===
List of studio albums, with selected chart positions, sales, and certifications
Title	Details	Peak chart positions			Sales	Certifications
Title	Details	JPN	JPN Cmb. (Note: Oricon Combined Albums Chart was established on December 24, 2018.)	JPN Hot	Sales	Certifications
Twelve	Released: January 13, 2016; Label: EMI; Formats: CD, digital download, streaming	10	—	10	JPN: 13,445 (phy.)	
Mrs. Green Apple	Released: January 11, 2017; Label: EMI; Formats: CD, digital download, streaming	9	—	7	JPN: 16,812 (phy.)	
Ensemble	Released: April 18, 2018; Label: EMI; Formats: CD, digital download, streaming	3	—	3	JPN: 19,776 (phy.)	
Attitude	Released: October 2, 2019; Label: EMI; Formats: CD, digital download, streaming	4	3	1	JPN: 37,648 (phy.)	RIAJ: Gold (phy.)
Antenna	Released: July 4, 2023; Label: EMI; Formats: CD, digital download, streaming	2	1	1	JPN: 207,434 (phy.)	RIAJ: Platinum (phy.)
Pops	Released: September 29, 2026; Label: EMI; Formats: CD, digital download, streaming	1	1	1	JPN: 645,661 (phy.)	RIAJ: 3× Platinum (phy.)
"—" denotes a recording that did not chart.

=== Compilation albums ===
List of compilation albums, with selected chart positions, sales, and certifications
Title	Details	Peak chart positions			Sales	Certifications
Title	Details	JPN	JPN Cmb.	JPN Hot	Sales	Certifications
5	Released: July 8, 2020; Label: EMI; Formats: CD, digital download, streaming	2	1	1	JPN: 65,138 (phy.)	RIAJ: Platinum (phy.)
Inferno & More Hits	Released: December 1, 2023; Label: UME; Formats: Digital download, streaming	—	—	—		
10	Released: July 8, 2025; Label: EMI; Formats: CD, digital download, streaming	1	1	1	JPN: 760,162	RIAJ: Million (phy.)
"—" denotes a recording that did not chart.

=== Soundtrack albums ===
List of soundtrack albums, with selected chart positions, sales, and certifications
Title	Details	Peak chart positions	
Title	Details	JPN Cmb.	JPN Hot
The White Lounge in Cinema: Original Soundtrack	Released: September 23, 2024; Label: EMI; Formats: Digital download, streaming	9	9

=== Extended plays ===
List of extended plays, with selected chart positions, sales, and certifications
Title	Details	Peak chart positions			Sales	Certifications
Title	Details	JPN	JPN Cmb.	JPN Hot	Sales	Certifications
Introduction	Released: July 5, 2014; Label: Independent; Format: CD	—	—	—		
Progressive	Released: February 18, 2015; Label: Probably; Formats: CD, digital download, streaming	125	—	30		
Variety	Released: July 8, 2015; Label: EMI; Formats: CD, digital download, streaming	38	—	32		
Unity	Released: July 8, 2022; Label: EMI; Formats: CD, digital download, streaming	3	2	2	JPN: 35,152 (phy.)	RIAJ: Gold (phy.)
"—" denotes a recording that did not chart.

=== Singles ===
List of singles, with selected chart positions, showing year released, certification and album name
Title	Year	Peak chart positions				Certifications	Album
Title	Year	JPN	JPN Cmb. (Note: Oricon Combined Singles Chart was established on December 24, 2018.)	JPN Hot	WW	Certifications	Album
"Speaking"	2015	22	—	20	—	RIAJ: Platinum (st.)	Twelve
"Samama Festival!" (サママ・フェスティバル!)	2016	9	—	23	—	RIAJ: Gold (st.)	Mrs. Green Apple
"In the Morning"	2016	24	—	35	—	RIAJ: Gold (st.)	Mrs. Green Apple
"Dokoka de Hi wa Noboru" (どこかで日は昇る)	2017	13	—	37	—		Ensemble
"Wanted! Wanted!"	2017	13	—	7	—	RIAJ: Gold (dig.); 3× Platinum (st.)	Ensemble
"Whoo Whoo Whoo"	2017	—	—	—	—		Ensemble
"Love Me, Love You"	2018	19	—	18	—	RIAJ: Platinum (st.)	Ensemble
"Ao to Natsu" (青と夏)	2018	14	3	7	—	RIAJ: Platinum (dig.); Diamond (st.)	Attitude
"Boku no Koto" (僕のこと)	2019	4	4	7	—	RIAJ: Gold (dig.); Diamond (st.)	Attitude
"Romanticism" (ロマンチシズム)	2019	9	7	11	—	RIAJ: 3× Platinum (st.)	Attitude
"Inferno" (インフェルノ)	2019	—	17	17	—	RIAJ: Platinum (dig.); Diamond (st.)	Unity
"Present" (English version)	2020	—	45	47	—		5
"New My Normal" (ニュー・マイ・ノーマル)	2022	—	38	23	—	RIAJ: Platinum (st.)	Unity
"Soranji"	2022	6	5	7	—	RIAJ: Gold (dig.); Diamond (st.)	Antenna
"Boku no Koto" (僕のこと; Orchestra version)	2023	—	—	93	—		5
"Que Sera Sera" (ケセラセラ)	2023	—	5	3	— (Note: "Que Sera Sera" did not enter the Billboard Global 200, but peaked at number 117 on the Global Excl. US.)	RIAJ: Platinum (dig.); Diamond (st.)	Antenna
"Nachtmusik" (ナハトムジーク)	2024	—	8	3	— (Note: "Nachtmusik" did not enter the Billboard Global 200, but peaked at number 152 on the Global Excl. US.)	RIAJ: Platinum (st.)	10
"Lilac" (ライラック)	2024	—	1	1	73	RIAJ: Platinum (dig.); Diamond (st.)	10
"Dear"	2024	—	12	8	—	RIAJ: Platinum (st.)	10
"Columbus" (コロンブス)	2024	—	7	4	— (Note: "Columbus" did not enter the Billboard Global 200, but peaked at number 88 on the Global Excl. US.)	RIAJ: 2× Platinum (st.)	10
"Apollodorus" (アポロドロス)	2024	—	20	16	—	RIAJ: Gold (st.)	10
"Familie"	2024	—	8	3	— (Note: "Familie" did not enter the Billboard Global 200, but peaked at number 118 on the Global Excl. US.)	RIAJ: 2× Platinum (st.)	10
"Bitter Vacances" (ビターバカンス)	2024	—	6	1	184	RIAJ: 2× Platinum (st.)	10
"Darling" (ダーリン)	2025	—	1	2	79	RIAJ: Gold (dig.); 3× Platinum (st.)	10
"Kusushiki" (クスシキ)	2025	—	2	1	88	RIAJ: Gold (dig.); 2× Platinum (st.)	10
"Heaven" (天国)	2025	—	4	1	143	RIAJ: Platinum (st.)	10
"Breakfast"	2025	—	6	1	173	RIAJ: Platinum (st.)	10
"Carrying Happiness"	2025	—	13	4	— (Note: "Carrying Happiness" did not enter the Billboard Global 200, but peaked at number 149 on the Global Excl. US.)	RIAJ: Gold (st.)	Pops
"Summer Shadow" (夏の影)	2025	—	5	2	— (Note: "Summer Shadow" did not enter the Billboard Global 200, but peaked at number 173 on the Global Excl. US.)	RIAJ: Gold (st.)	Pops
"Good Day"	2025	—	5	3	—	RIAJ: Platinum (st.)	Pops
"Lulu"	2026	—	4	1	79	RIAJ: Gold (dig.); Platinum (st.)	Pops
"Wind and Town" (風と町)	2026	—	8	2	—		Pops
"Brand New"	2026	—	6	3	— (Note: "Brand New" did not enter the Billboard Global 200, but peaked at number 98 on the Global Excl. US.)		Pops
"—" denotes a recording that did not chart.

=== Other charted and certified songs ===
List of other charted and certified songs, with selected chart positions, showing year released, certification and album name
Title	Year	Peak chart positions		Certifications	Album
Title	Year	JPN Cmb.	JPN Hot	Certifications	Album
"Gahōjin" (我逢人)	2015	—	—	RIAJ: Gold (st.)	Progressive
"Start"	2015	48	45	RIAJ: Gold (dig.); 3× Platinum (st.)	Variety
"Watashi" (私)	2016	—	81		Twelve
"Hug"	2016	—	—	RIAJ: Gold (st.)	Twelve
"Shoki no Uta" (庶幾の唄)	2016	—	—	RIAJ: Gold (st.)	Twelve
"Kujira no Uta" (鯨の唄)	2017	—	53	RIAJ: Gold (st.)	Mrs. Green Apple
"Shunshū" (春愁)	2018	—	89	RIAJ: 2× Platinum (st.)	"Love Me, Love You"
"Party"	2018	—	99		Ensemble
"Aufheben" (アウフヘーベン)	2018	—	—	RIAJ: Gold (st.)	Ensemble
"Tenbyō no Uta" (点描の唄) (featuring Sonoko Inoue)	2018	—	13	RIAJ: Gold (dig.); Diamond (st.)	"Ao to Natsu"
"A Priori" (ア・プリオリ)	2018	—	—	RIAJ: Gold (st.)	"Ao to Natsu"
"Attitude"	2019	—	66	RIAJ: Platinum (st.)	Attitude
"Cheers"	2019	—	26	RIAJ: Platinum (st.)	Attitude
"Lovin'"	2019	—	93	RIAJ: Platinum (st.)	Attitude
"Uso Ja Nai yo" (嘘じゃないよ)	2019	—	—	RIAJ: Gold (st.)	Attitude
"Avoid Note" (アボイドノート)	2020	—	51		5
"Present" (Japanese version)	2020	—	64		5
"Stardom" (スターダム)	2020	—	92		5
"Dance Hall" (ダンスホール)	2022	6	8	RIAJ: Gold (dig.); Diamond (st.)	Unity
"Blue Ambience" (ブルーアンビエンス) (featuring Asmi)	2022	—	42	RIAJ: 3× Platinum (st.)	Unity
"I'm Invincible" (私は最強)	2022	—	16	RIAJ: 2× Platinum (st.)	Antenna
"Magic"	2023	9	3	RIAJ: 3× Platinum (st.)	Antenna
"Antenna"	2023	31	15	RIAJ: 2× Platinum (st.)	Antenna
"Loneliness"	2023	—	—	RIAJ: Gold (st.)	Antenna
"Feeling"	2023	—	—	RIAJ: Gold (st.)	Antenna
"Darling" (18Fes version; live)	2025	—	44		"Darling"
"Seeds of Delight" (慶びの種)	2025	17	11		10
"Kyōshinshō" (狭心症)	2025	5	4		Dear Jubilee: Radwimps Tribute
"Kyōhan" (共犯)	2026	10	2		Pops
"Cinderella" (シンデレラ)	2026	26	4		Pops
"Hon to Suisei" (本と彗星)	2026	42	26		Pops
"A Posteriori" (ア・ポステリオリ)	2026	26	15		Pops
"Episode" (エピソード)	2026	—	31		Pops
"Really Really"	2026	—	38		Pops
"Project 4" (プロジェクト4)	2026	—	52		Pops
"Mayakashi" (瞞し)	2026	—	34		Pops
"Kinjita Asobi" (禁じた遊び)	2026	46	28		Pops
"Variety"	2026	35	19		Pops
"—" denotes a recording that did not chart.

== Awards and nominations ==
Name of the award ceremony, year presented, award category, nominee(s) of the award and the result of the nomination
Award ceremony	Year	Award category	Work(s)/nominee(s)	Result	Ref.
48th Anime Grand Prix	2026	Best Theme Song	"Lulu."	8th place	
GQ Japan Men of the Year Awards	2023	Best Artist	Mrs. Green Apple	Won	
Japan Gold Disc Awards	2025	Artist of the Year (Japan)	Mrs. Green Apple	Won	
Japan Gold Disc Awards	2025	Best 5 Songs by Streaming	"Lilac"	Won	
Japan Record Awards	2022	Grand Prix	"Dance Hall"	Nominated	
Japan Record Awards	2022	Excellent Work Award (Songs of the Year)	"Dance Hall"	Won	
Japan Record Awards	2023	Grand Prix	"Que Sera Sera"	Won	
Japan Record Awards	2023	Excellent Work Award (Songs of the Year)	"Que Sera Sera"	Won	
Japan Record Awards	2024	Grand Prix	"Lilac"	Won	
Japan Record Awards	2025	Grand Prix	"Darling"	Won	
MTV Video Music Awards Japan	2023	Video of the Year	"Que Sera Sera"	Won	
MTV Video Music Awards Japan	2023	Best Visual Effects	"Que Sera Sera"	Won	
MTV Video Music Awards Japan	2023	Best Alternative Video	"Magic"	Won	
MTV Video Music Awards Japan	2023	Artist of the Year	Mrs. Green Apple	Won	
MTV Video Music Awards Japan	2025	Best Group Video (Japan)	"Lilac"	Won	
MTV Video Music Awards Japan	2025	Best Art Direction Video	"Lilac"	Won	
MTV Video Music Awards Japan	2025	Best Cinematography	"Lilac"	Won	
MTV Video Music Awards Japan	2026	Video of the Year	"Lulu."	Nominated	
MTV Video Music Awards Japan	2026	Video of the Year	"Brand New"	Won	
MTV Video Music Awards Japan	2026	Best Editing	"Brand New"	Won	
MTV Video Music Awards Japan	2026	Best Visual Effects	"クスシキ" (Kusushiki)	Won	
MTV Video Music Awards Japan	2026	Best Alternative Video	"lulu."	Won	
MTV Video Music Awards Japan	2026	Best Live Production	"DOME TOUR 2025 "BABEL no TOH" [1, 2, 3]	Won	
Music Awards Japan	2025	Song of the Year	"Lilac"	Nominated	
Music Awards Japan	2025	Artist of the Year	Mrs. Green Apple	Won	
Music Awards Japan	2025	Album of the Year	Antenna	Nominated	
Music Awards Japan	2025	Best Japanese Song	"Lilac"	Nominated	
Music Awards Japan	2025	Best J-Rock Song	"Lilac"	Nominated	
Music Awards Japan	2025	Best Anime Song	"Lilac"	Nominated	
Music Awards Japan	2025	Best Music Video	"Lilac"	Nominated	
Music Awards Japan	2025	Best of Listeners' Choice: Japanese Song powered by Spotify	"Lilac"	Nominated	
Music Awards Japan	2025	Best Japanese Song Artist	Mrs. Green Apple	Won	
Music Awards Japan	2025	Best J-Rock Artist	Mrs. Green Apple	Nominated	
Music Awards Japan	2025	Best Japanese Dance Pop Artist	Mrs. Green Apple	Nominated	
Music Awards Japan	2025	Special Award: KaraokeKaraoke of the Year: J-Pop powered by DAM & JOYSOUND	"Lilac"	Won	
Music Awards Japan	2026	Artist of the Year	Mrs. Green Apple	Won	
Music Awards Japan	2026	Album of the Year	10	Nominated	
Music Awards Japan	2026	Best J-POP Song	"Darling"	Nominated	
Music Awards Japan	2026	Best Long-Charting Song	"Lilac"	Nominated	
Music Awards Japan	2026	Best J-POP Artist	Mrs. Green Apple	Won	
Music Awards Japan	2026	Best Long-Charting Album	Antenna	Nominated	
Music Awards Japan	2026	Best of Listeners' Choice: Japanese Song powered by Spotify	"Kusushiki"	Nominated	
Music Awards Japan	2026	Best of Listeners' Choice: Japanese Song powered by Spotify	"Darling"	Nominated	
Music Awards Japan	2026	Best Analog Record Sales	10	Nominated	
