= Back Number =

Japanese three-piece band

- Origin: Gunma Prefecture, Japan
- Genres: Rock; pop rock; j-pop
- Years active: 2004–present
- Labels: Idolsmith Recordings; Universal Sigma; A&M
- Members: Iyori Shimizu; Kazuya Kojima; Hisashi Kurihara
- Past members: Makio Saito
- Website: backnumber.info

Back Number (Japanese: バックナンバー, Hepburn: Bakku Nambā; stylized in all lowercase) is a Japanese rock power trio formed in 2004. The band consists of Iyori Shimizu (lead vocals, guitar), Kazuya Kojima (bass guitar, backing vocals), and Hisashi Kurihara (drums, percussion). The group signed to independent record label Idolsmith Recordings in 2009 and released their debut EP Nogashita Sakana (逃した魚, Fish Set Free) (2009) and studio album Ato no Matsuri (あとのまつり, Too Late) (2010). They signed to Universal Sigma in 2011. The band have a major cult following in Japan.

The group's biggest hit is "Christmas Song", which peaked at number-one for three weeks on the Japan Hot 100 chart, and was later certified million by the Recording Industry Association of Japan. Their first compilation album, Encore (2016), reached number one on the Billboard Japan Hot Album for two consecutive weeks in 2016 and also ranked number five on the Oricon yearly best-selling album chart of 2017. In 2018, back number successfully held a Dome Tour titled “stay with you”, including a 2-night-concert in Tokyo Dome. All tickets for 5 concerts are sold out within 2 hours, mobilized over 45,000 guests per concert.

== Members ==
Current members

- Iyori Shimizu – lead vocals, guitar (2004–present)
- Kazuya Kojima – bass guitar, backing vocals (2005–present)
- Hisashi Kurihara – drums, percussion (2006–present)

Former members

- Makio Saito – guitar, backing vocals (2006–2007)

== History ==
In 2004, Iyori Shimizu formed the band in Gunma Prefecture. Prior to the band's formation, Shimizu lost a girlfriend to another band member. This experience made him feel "outdated", which is why he named the band "back number".

In November 2004, the band performed their first live show at Isezaki DUSTBOWL.

Since 2005, voluntary live performances were held annually in November (until 2007), following the release of the demo CD.

In 2007, the band performed a one-man live show, mobilized over 150 people and the tickets were sold out. In the same year, the band was chosen as the semi-best rocker (second place) from more than 100 bands at the band audition "ROCKERS 2007" sponsored by FM Gunma, which is a gateway for the northern Kanto band. It became well known in the local media.

In April 2008, their regular radio program "PIZZA SMALL WORLD" started broadcasting at the radio station FM TARO for an area of Ota City, Gunma Prefecture (broadcast ended in March 2014). In June 2008, the band won a qualifying competition from among 500 pairs of entries at the Shonan Music Festival Opening Act Audition and secured an appearance at the large outdoor festival Shonan Music Festival Vol. 2.

On February 18, 2009, the band released their first mini album, Nogashita Sakana, and became HMV push item "HOT PICKS", TOWER RECORDS push item "Tawareko Men" for the first time, selected as power play of FM station and Sony Ericsson CS commercial song, the band then was widely known throughout the country. On May 27, Tawareko, a back number free live with HMV as the co-ownership was held at SHIBUYA-BOXX, and more than 500 people joined, which exceeded the capacity of the regular entry. In June, the band finished a tour at the Ferrari Temple Park Outdoor Stage in Isezaki City with a crowd of 500 people. After that, the band also positively appeared in events such as "SAKAE-SPRING", "MINAMI WHEEL", "TREASURE", "MUSIC CUBE" all over the country, school festival, install alive, etc.

On June 2, 2010, released their first full-length album, Ato no Matsuri.

On April 6, 2011, the band made their major debut with the single "Hanabira".

On September 7, 2013, the band held a one-man live "back number live at Nippon Budokan - stay with us-" at Nippon Budokan.

From April 2014, the band was appointed as a regular personality of Nippon Broadcasting "All Night Nippon" on every Tuesday. On September 14, 2014, at the Yokohama Arena, the first arena performance "love stories tour 2014 - Yokohama love story 2 ~" was held.

On December 15, 2015, their fifth album, Chandelier, reached first place on the Oricon chart for two consecutive weeks.

On December 28, 2016, the band released their own all-time best album, Encore, which reached number one on the Billboard Japan Hot Album for two consecutive weeks.

On December 20, 2017, the band released their 17th single, Mabataki, which reached number one on the Recochoku Weekly Download Charts for two weeks.

== Discography ==
Back Number discography
- Studio albums: 7
- EPs: 1
- Compilation albums: 1
- Singles: 22

=== Albums ===
List of albums, with selected details, chart positions sales, and certifications
Title	Details	Peak chart positions	Sales	Certifications
Title	Details	JPN (Note: Sources for chart positions are as follows: Nogashita Sakana, Ato no Matsuri, Super Star Blues Love Story Chandelier Encore.)	Sales	Certifications
Nogashita Sakana	Type: Extended play; Released: June 2, 2010; Label: Idolsmith Recordings; Format: CD	132		
Ato no Matsuri (後の祭り, "Too Late")	Type: Studio album; Released: June 2, 2010; Label: Idolsmith Recordings; Format: CD	55		
Superstar	Type: Studio album; Released: October 26, 2011; Label: Universal Sigma, A&M; Format: CD, digital download, streaming	4		RIAJ: Gold (phy.)
Blues	Type: Studio album; Released: November 21, 2012; Label: Universal Sigma, A&M; Format: CD, CD+DVD, digital download, streaming	7		RIAJ: Gold (phy.)
Love Story	Type: Studio album; Released: March 26, 2014; Label: Universal Sigma, A&M; Format: CD, CD+DVD, digital download, streaming	2		RIAJ: Gold (phy.)
Chandelier	Type: Studio album; Released: December 9, 2015; Label: Universal Sigma, A&M; Format: CD, CD+DVD, digital download, streaming	1	JPN: 359,000	RIAJ: Platinum (phy.)
Encore	Type: Greatest hits album; Released: December 28, 2016; Label: Universal Sigma, A&M; Format: CD, CD+DVD, digital download, streaming	2	JPN: 853,000 (Note: Combined sales figures for Encore: 674,183 (physical sales) + 187,158 (digital sales).)	RIAJ: 2× Platinum (phy.); Gold (dig.)
Magic	Type: Studio album; Released: March 27, 2019; Label: Universal Sigma, A&M; Format: CD, CD+DVD, CD+Blu-ray, digital download, streaming	1	JPN: 361,000 (Note: Combined sales figures for Magic: 315,813 (physical sales) + 44,786 (digital sales).)	RIAJ: Platinum (phy.)
Humor	Type: Studio album; Released: January 17, 2023; Label: Universal Sigma, A&M; Format: CD, CD+DVD, CD+Blu-ray, digital download, streaming	1	JPN: 140,025	RIAJ: Platinum (phy.)

=== Independent production ===
	Release date	Title
1st	November 2005	Gift×Life
2nd	November 2006	then Fish
3rd	November 2007	Distance Knock Tender

=== Singles ===
List of singles as lead artist, showing year released, selected chart positions, physical sales, certifications, and album name
Title	Year	Peak chart positions				Physical sales (JPN)	Certifications	Album
Title	Year	JPN Oricon	JPN Hot	KOR	WW Excl. US	Physical sales (JPN)	Certifications	Album
"Shiawase" (幸せ)	2011	—	46	—	—			Superstar
"Hanabira" (はなびら)	2011	45	13	—	—	3,000	RIAJ: Gold (st.)	Superstar
"Hanataba" (花束)	2011	18	3	—	—	13,000	RIAJ: 3× Platinum (dig.); Diamond (st.)	Superstar
"Omoidasenakunaru Hi Made" (思い出せなくなるその日まで)	2011	24	1	—	—	5,000	RIAJ: Gold (dig.); Gold (st.)	Superstar
"Koi" (恋)	2012	24	12	—	—	7,000	RIAJ: Gold (dig.); 2× Platinum (st.)	Blues
"Nichiyoubi" (日曜日)	2012	24	9	—	—	7,000	RIAJ: Gold (dig.); Platinum (st.)	Blues
"Watagashi" (わたがし)	2012	14	3	—	—	9,000	RIAJ: Gold (dig.); 2× Platinum (st.)	Blues
"Aoi Haru" (青い春)	2012	14	4	—	—	10,000	RIAJ: Platinum (dig.); Platinum (st.)	Blues
"Takane no Hanako-san" (高嶺の花子さん)	2013	11	3	—	—	15,000	RIAJ: 3× Platinum (dig.); Diamond (st.)	Love Story
"Fish"	2014	4	5	—	—	21,000	RIAJ: Gold (st.)	Love Story
"Tsunaida Te Kara" (繋いだ手から)	2014	9	6	—	—	11,000	RIAJ: Gold (dig.); Platinum (st.)	Love Story
"Heroine" (ヒロイン)	2015	6	2	55	—	43,000	RIAJ: 2× Platinum (dig.); 3× Platinum (st.)	Chandelier
"Sister"	2015	9	5	—	—	32,000	RIAJ: Gold (dig.); Platinum (st.)	Chandelier
"Tegami" (手紙)	2015	4	2	—	—	29,000	RIAJ: Gold (dig.); Platinum (st.)	Chandelier
"Christmas Song" (クリスマスソング)	2015	2	1	—	—	100,000	RIAJ: Gold (phy.); Million (dig.); 3× Platinum (st.)	Chandelier
"Boku no Namae o" (僕の名前を)	2016	6	1	—	—	33,000	RIAJ: Gold (dig.); Gold (st.)	Encore
"Happy End" (ハッピーエンド)	2016	5	4	—	—	59,000	RIAJ: 2× Platinum (dig.); Diamond (st.)	Encore
"Mabataki" (瞬き)	2017	5	2	—	—	61,000	RIAJ: 2× Platinum (dig.); 2× Platinum (st.)	Magic
"Dai Fuseikai" (大不正解)	2018	3	2	—	—	45,000	RIAJ: Platinum (dig.); Platinum (st.)	Magic
"Old Fashion" (オールドファッション)	2018	4	1	—	—	65,000	RIAJ: 2× Platinum (dig.); 2× Platinum (st.)	Magic
"Happy Birthday"	2019	4	2	—	—	45,000	RIAJ: 2× Platinum (dig.); 3× Platinum (st.)	Magic
"Kīro" (黄色)	2021	3	2	—	99	26,000	RIAJ: 2× Platinum (st.)	Humor
"To New Lovers" (新しい恋人達に)	2024	6	1	—	167	24,843	RIAJ: Gold (dig.); 2× Platinum (st.)	Non-album single
"—" denotes releases that did not chart or were not released in that region.

=== Digital singles ===
List of digital singles as lead artist, showing year released, selected chart positions, certifications, and album name
Title	Year	Peak chart positions		Certifications	Album
Title	Year	JPN Hot	WW	Certifications	Album
"Kuroi Neko no Uta" (黒い猫の歌)	2016	12	—		Encore
"Emerald" (エメラルド)	2020	7	— (Note: "Emerald" did not enter the Billboard Global 200, but peaked at number 191 on the Global Excl. US.)	RIAJ: Gold (dig.); Platinum (st.)	Humor
"Phantom Thief" (怪盗)	2021	3	87	RIAJ: Gold (dig.); 3× Platinum (st.)	Humor
"Suiheisen" (水平線)	2021	2	123	RIAJ: Platinum (dig.); Diamond (st.)	Humor
"Velvet no Uta" (ベルベットの詩)	2022	13	— (Note: "Velvet no Uta" did not enter the Billboard Global 200, but peaked at number 128 on the Global Excl. US.)	RIAJ: 2× Platinum (st.)	Humor
"I Love You" (アイラブユー)	2022	5	— (Note: "I Love You" did not enter the Billboard Global 200, but peaked at number 167 on the Global Excl. US.)	RIAJ: Gold (dig.); 3× Platinum (st.)	Humor
"Size of the Kaiju" (怪獣のサイズ)	2023	16	—		Non-album singles
"Fuyu to Haru" (冬と春)	2024	9	—	RIAJ: Platinum (st.)	Non-album singles
"Blue Amber" (ブルーアンバー)	2025	1	—	RIAJ: 2× Platinum (st.)	Non-album singles
"Sincerely, from a Future" (ある未来より愛を込めて)	2025	22	—		Non-album singles
"The Unveiling" (幕が上がる)	2025	7	—		Non-album singles
"Want Want Want" (どうしてもどうしても)	2025	7	—		Non-album singles
"—" denotes releases that did not chart or were not released in that region.

=== Other charted and certified songs ===
List of singles as lead artist, showing year released, selected chart positions, certifications, and album name
Title	Year	Peak chart positions	Certifications	Album
Title	Year	JPN Hot	Certifications	Album
"Stay with Me"	2010	89		Ato no Matsuri
"Superstar ni Nattara" (スーパースターになったら)	2011	—	RIAJ: Gold (st.)	Superstar
"Check no One Piece" (チェックのワンピース)	2011	73	RIAJ: Platinum (st.)	Superstar
"Ritz Party" (リッツパーティー)	2011	—	RIAJ: Gold (st.)	Superstar
"Setagaya Love Story" (世田谷ラブストーリー)	2014	—	RIAJ: Platinum (st.)	Love Story
"Urban Life" (アーバンライフ)	2015	100		Heroine
"Apple Pie" (アップルパイ)	2015	89	RIAJ: Gold (st.)	Heroine
"Boku wa Kimi no Koto ga Suki Dakedo Kimi wa Boku o Betsu ni Suki Janai Mitai" (僕は君の事が好きだけど君は僕を別に好きじゃないみたい)	2015	45	RIAJ: Platinum (st.)	Chandelier
"Kimi no Koibito ni Nattara" (君の恋人になったら)	2016	41	RIAJ: Platinum (st.)	Happy End
"Secret Kiss" (秘密のキス)	2023	76	RIAJ: Gold (st.)	Humor
"—" denotes releases that did not chart.

=== DVD ===
	Release date	Title	Highest rank (Oricon)
1st	February 25, 2015	"Love stories tour 2014 ~ Yokohama love story 2 ~"	3
2nd	November 15, 2017	"All Our Yesterdays TOUR 2017 at SAITAMA SUPER ARENA"	1
3rd	March 25, 2020	"NO MAGIC TOUR 2019 at Osaka-jo Hall"	2
4th	October 11, 2023	"in your humor tour 2023 at Tokyo Dome"	1

=== Live tour ===
- Bolded performances are additional performances.

Schedule	Title	Conference venue
December 6 - December 22	Super Tour 2011	**4 locations nationwide, 4 shows** December 06 Nagoya ell Fits All December 08 Shinsaibashi MUSE December 17 Tokyo TSUTAYA O-EAST December 22 Fukuoka DRUM Be-1
March 16 - April 30	Love is blind tour 2012	**12 locations nationwide, 12 performances** March 16 Sapporo KRAPS HALL March 18 Sendai HooK March 30 Fukuoka DRUM LOGOS April 01 Nagoya CLUB QUATTRO April 04 Gunma CLUB FLEEZ April 07 Hiroshima Namiki Junction April 13 Osaka AKASO April 15 Takamatsu DIME April 19 Fukushima CLUB # 9 April 21 Niigata CLUB RIVERST April 27 Tokyo SHIBUYA-AX **April 30 Tokyo Shibuya Public Hall**
January 14 - March 30	Back to the blues tour 2013	**17 places nationwide, 19 performances** January 14 Chiba LOOK January 15 Mito LIGHT HOUSE January 17 Sendai Rensa January 20 Sapporo PENNY LANE 24 January 26 Niigata LOTS January 27 Toyama SOUL POWER January 31 Kagoshima CAPARVO HALL February 01 Kumamoto DRUM Be-9 V1 February 03 Okayama IMAGE February 05 Hiroshima CLUB QUATTRO February 07 Kochi X-pt. February 09 Takamatsu Olive Hall February 14 Gunma club FLEEZ March 1 Fukuoka International Conference Hall Main Hall March 03 Aichi Nagoya City Public Hall Great Hall **March 08 Osaka NHK Osaka Hall** March 09 Osaka NHK Osaka Hall March 29–30 Tokyo Shibuya Public Hall
May 14 - September 23	Love stories tour 2014	**22 places nationwide, 24 performances** May 14 Gunma Ota Nita Cultural Center Aerith Hall May 16 Gunma Isezaki City Cultural Center May 18 Saitama Omiya Sonic City Hall Hall May 23 Kagoshima Kagoshima Prefectural Cultural Center Baoshan Hall May 25 Fukuoka Fukuoka Sun Palace May 31 Okayama Okayama City Hall June 1 Hiroshima Ueno Gakuen Hall June 06 Shizuoka Act City Hamamatsu Great Hall June 08 Hyogo Kobe International Hall Kokusai Hall June 14 Hokkaido Sapporo Municipal Hall June 20 Niigata Niigata Prefectural Civic Center June 21 Mori Hall of Ishikawa Honda June 28 Miyagi Tokyo Electron Hall, Miyagi June 29 Iwate Morioka Civil Cultural Hall Great Hall July 04–05 Osaka Orix Theater July 13 Ehime Matsuyama City Hall Great Hall July 15 Kagawa Sunport Hall Takamatsu Great Hall July 19 Aichi Nagoya International Conference Center Century Hall July 23 Tokyo Nakano Sun Plaza Hall July 25 Tokyo NHK Hall **September 14th - 15th Kanagawa Yokohama Arena** **September 23 Osaka Osakajo Hall**
March 25 - June 7	Urban Live Tour 2015	**10 places nationwide, 16 performances** March 25–26 Niigata LOTS March 31 - April 01 Sendai Rensa April 03 Hokkaido Zepp Sapporo April 08–09 Aichi Zepp Nagoya April 13–14 Osaka Zepp Namba April 17 Hiroshima BLUE LIVE April 19 Fukuoka Zepp Fukuoka April 23–24 Tokyo Zepp Tokyo April 29 Okinawa Sakurazaka Central **June 06–07 Chiba Makuhari Messe Event Hall**
January 24 - July 24	Mirrorball and Chandelier Tour 2016	**32 places nationwide, 39 performances** Hall performance January 24 Chiba Ichikawa City Cultural Center Great Hall January 28 Tokyo TAMASHIN RISURU Hall February 04 Oita iichiko Grand Cita February 06 Miyazaki Miyazaki citizens culture hall If it is Nara, February 11th 100th anniversary hall February 12 Mie Yokkaichi City Cultural Center First Hall February 19 Hiroshima Ueno Gakuen Hall February 21 Okayama Okayama City Hall February 25 Kanagawa Kanagawa Prefectural Hall February 28 Ibaraki Ibaraki prefectural prefectural cultural center March 03 Hokkaido Nitori Cultural Hall March 04 Hokkaido Asahikawa Citizens' Cultural Center Great Hall March 12 Hyogo Kobe International Hall Kokusai Hall March 13 Kyoto Rome Theater Kyoto March 20 Niigata Niigata Prefectural Civic Center March 21 Toyama Toyama Overdoor Hall March 25 Shizuoka Shizuoka Citizens' Culture Center Great Hall April 01 Ehime Matsuyama City Hall Great Hall April 03 Kagawa alpha ANAUKUKI Hall big hall April 08 Fukushima Koriyama Citizens' Cultural Center Great Hall April 09 Nagano Hokuto Culture Hall April 15 Miyagi Sendai Sun Plaza Hall April 17 Aomori Link Station Hall Aomori April 23–24 Okinawa Namura Hall April 27 Saitama Omiya Sonic City Hall (transfer performance on March 27) **April 29 Gunma Baysia Culture Hall Great Hall** **Arena performance** June 04–05 Aichi NGK Hall June 18–19 Chiba Makuhari Messe International Exhibition Hall 9 - 11 Hall June 29–30 Osaka Osakajo Hall July 09 Fukuoka Marine Messe Fukuoka **July 10 Fukuoka Marine Messe Fukuoka** **July 14–15 Tokyo Nippon Budokan** July 23–24 Gumma Yamada Green Dome Maebashi
February 25 - June 11	Back number "All Our Yesterdays Tour 2017"	**15 places nationwide, 30 performances** February 25–26 Chiba Makuhari Messe International Exhibition Hall Makuhari Event Hall March 03–04 Osaka Osakajo Hall March 11–12 Fukui Sun Dome Fukui March 18–19 Miyagi Sekisui Heim Super Arena April 01–02 Ehime Ehime Prefecture Budokan April 08–09 Kanagawa Yokohama Arena April 15–16 Hyogo Kobe World Memorial Hall April 22–23 Fukuoka Marine Messe Fukuoka April 29–30 Niigata Toki Messe: Niigata Convention Center May 05–06 Shizuoka Shizuoka Ecopa Arena May 12–13 Hokkaido Hokkaido Prefectural Sports Center North Sea Yeah May 17–18, Aichi NGK Hall May 27–28 Hiroshima Hiroshima Green Arena June 03–04 Saitama Saitama Super Arena June 10–11 Okinawa Okinawa Convention Center Exhibition Building

== Awards ==
- ROCKERS 2007 · Semi Best Rockers (2007)
- 4th CD Shop Awards · Finalist Award Super Star (2012)
- 5th CD Shop Awards · Finalist Award blues (2013)
- 7th CD Shop Awards · Finalist Award Love Story (2015)
- SPACE SHOWER MUSIC AWARDS - BEST GROUP ARTIST (2016)
- The 87th Drama Academy Award "Christmas Song" (2016)
- The 58th Japan Record Awards · Excellent Album Award Chandelier (2016)
- DAM annual karaoke request ranking · First place (2016)
- Uta-Net annual lyrics browsing artist ranking: First place (2016)
- 8th CD Shop Awards · Finalist Award Chandelier (2017)
