= Coupling Songs: 'Side B' =

- The cover of "Kuroi Shizuku" and Coupling Songs: 'Side B'

Compilation album by Superfly
- Released: December 2, 2015
- Recorded: 2007–2014
- Genre: Pop, rock
- Length: 59:10
- Label: Warner Music Japan

Superfly chronology
White (2015)	Coupling Songs: 'Side B' (2015)

Coupling Songs: 'Side B' is a compilation album by Japanese musical unit Superfly. Released on December 2, 2015, the album was packaged as a 2-CD set with Superfly's single "Kuroi Shizuku", and compiles Superfly's original B-sides released between 2007 and 2014.

== Background and development ==
Superfly debuted as a musical group in 2007, with the single "Hello Hello". Originally a two-member group consisting of vocalist Shiho Ochi and guitarist/producer Kōichi Tabo, until the band's third single "I Spy I Spy" (2007), when Tabo withdrew from the band's line-up to act as a behind-the-scenes member of the project. In 2008, Superfly gained national recognition with the song "Ai o Komete Hanataba o" (2008). Used as the drama Edison no Haha's theme song, the song was a great commercial success, certified for one million paid downloads in 2014 by the Recording Industry Association of Japan. In 2010, Superfly released "Wildflower" & Cover Songs: Complete Best 'Track 3', a two-CD compilation to commemorate the band's 10th physically released single. The collection featured a four-track original single led by the song "Wildflower", used as a theme song for the Fuji TV drama Gold, as well as a compilation of all of the B-sides of Western cover songs Superfly had released between 2007 and 2009. The two-CD set was a commercial success, debuting at number one on Oricon's weekly albums chart, and receiving a Platinum certification.

In May 2015, the fifth original album by Superfly was released, White. Taking a year to write, the album was partially recorded in Los Angeles, when vocalist Shiho Ochi traveled there to collaborate with Chris Cester, the former lead singer of Australian Jet. Superfly worked together with American songwriters Jason Hill and Bonnie McKee, as well as Japanese singer-songwriter Bonnie Pink and the poet Bin Sugawara. The album was promoted primarily with the song "Beautiful", which Ochi wrote for the Mother Game: Kanojo-tachi no Kaikyū. Released digitally on May 8, the song was a commercial success, certified Platinum by the Recording Industry Association of Japan. From July 4 to December 14, Superfly performed a 39 date tour of Japan, entitled the White Tour. Part way through the tour, Superfly released McKee's contribution to the album "On Your Side" as a post-album single, featuring two compositions recorded for White that did not make the album's final cut.

== Content ==
Coupling Songs: 'Side B' compiles original B-sides released on Superfly's 19 physical singles released between 2007's "Hello Hello" and 2014's "Ai o Karada ni Fukikonde", including two songs which had been compiled onto original albums, "Ai to Kansha" on Superfly (2008) and "You You" on White (2015).

Many of the compositions had been written as homages to Western musicians from the 1960s and 1970s, such as "Kodoku no Hyena", which attempted to recreate the blues styles of Linda Ronstadt, Carly Simon and Santana. "Rescue Me" and "You You" were inspired by The Rolling Stones, with "You You" being written as a 2014 version of their song "Sympathy for the Devil" (1968), after vocalist Shiho Ochi attended the Rolling Stones' 2014 concert in Japan. "I My Me Mine Mine"'s live performance-style arrangement was meant to emulate the sound of British beat bands such as The Who and The Kinks.

Many of the songs were linked to the leading tracks of the singles they were featured on. "Perfect Lie" was featured on the "How Do I Survive?" (2008) single, because the group felt its "girly" sound would contrast well with the "strong" sound of "How Do I Survive?". "I My Me Mine Mine" was an 'image song' used in commercials and promotional activities for the film Smuggler: Omae no Mirai o Hakobe (2011), while the single's leading track "Ai o Kurae" served as the same film's theme song. "Mangekyō to Chō" had the same relationship to Superfly's song "Live" (2014), as the songs were used as the promotional and theme songs for the film Ushijima the Loan Shark 2 (2014) respectively. Two exceptions are "Owarinaki Game" and "Tōmei Ningen" from "Force" (2012), which were songs recorded during sessions for Superfly's same-titled album Force (2012) but did not appear on the final track list.

Coupling Songs: 'Side B' was released in two physical formats: a 2CD version alongside "Kuroi Shizuku" and a 2CD and DVD edition, also featuring a visual media disc showing Superfly's free live concert at Ōsaka-jō Nishinomaru Kōen in 2015 to commemorate the release of White. The collection's final track, "Ai o Komete Hanataba o (Piano Version)", was a recording originally released in March 2009. After Ochi had received praise for her piano-backed performances of the song on the television programs Mezamashi TV and Bokura no Ongaku this version received an exclusively digital release, with no further plans at the time to release it onto CD.

== Track listing ==
"Kuroi Shizuku" single
No.	Title	Lyrics	Music	Arranger(s)	Length
1.	"Kuroi Shizuku" (黒い雫, "Black Droplet")	Ochi, Jam	Ochi	Kōichi Tsutaya	3:30
2.	"Shin Sekai e" (新世界へ, "To the New World")	Sally#Cinnamon	Ochi, Tsutaya	Tsutaya	3:48
3.	"I Love Rock 'n' Roll"	Jake Hooker, Alan Merrill	Hooker, Merrill	Tsutaya	3:39
4.	"Beautiful" (live from Superfly White Tour 2015 at Tokyo Kokusai Forum; 東京国際フォーラム, "Tokyo International Forum")	Sally#Cinnamon	Ochi, Tsutaya	Tsutaya	5:48
5.	"On Your Side" (live from Superfly White Tour 2015 at Tokyo Kokusai Forum; 東京国際フォーラム, "Tokyo International Forum")	Ochi, Jam	Bonnie McKee, Michelle McCord	Tsutaya	7:05
Total length:					23:50

Coupling Songs: 'Side B' album
No.	Title	Writer(s)	Originating release	Length
1.	"Kodoku no Hyena" (孤独のハイエナ, "Lonely Hyena")	Shiho Ochi, Kōichi Tabo	"Hello Hello" (2007)	4:27
2.	"Rin" (凛, "Cold")	Ochi, Tabo	"Manifesto" (2007)	5:52
3.	"Ai to Kansha" (愛と感謝, "Love and Gratitude")	Ochi, Tabo	"Ai o Komete Hanataba o" (2008)	4:28
4.	"Perfect Lie"	Ochi, Kōichi Tsutaya	"How Do I Survive?" (2008)	3:56
5.	"Welcome to the Rockin' Show"	Tabo	"My Best of My Life" (2009)	3:21
6.	"Rescue Me"	Ochi, Tabo	"Eyes on Me" (2010)	4:09
7.	"Prima Donna" (プリマドンナ Purimadonna)	Ochi, Tabo	"Eyes on Me" (2010)	3:17
8.	"Different Ways"	Ochi	"Beep!!" / "Sunshine Sunshine" (2010)	3:40
9.	"I My Me Mine Mine"	Ochi	"Ai o Kurae" (2011)	2:38
10.	"28" (Nijūhachi)	Ochi, Tabo	"Kagayaku Tsuki no Yō ni" / "The Bird Without Wings" (2010)	4:16
11.	"Owarinaki Game" (終わりなきゲーム, "Endless Game")	Ochi, Tabo	"Force" (2012)	3:53
12.	"Tōmei Ningen" (透明人間, "Invisible Man")	Ochi, Tabo	"Force" (2012)	4:38
13.	"Mangekyō to Chō" (万華鏡と蝶, "The Kaleidoscope and the Butterfly")	Jam, Ochi	"Live" (2014)	3:56
14.	"The Long Way Home"	Ochi, Jam, Tsutaya	"Live" (2014)	5:03
15.	"You You"	Ochi, Jam, Tsutaya	"Ai o Karada ni Fukikonde" (2014)	4:40
16.	"Closet" (クローゼット Kurōzetto)	Ochi, Jam, Tsutaya	"Ai o Karada ni Fukikonde" (2014)	5:15
17.	"Ai o Komete Hanataba o (Piano Ver.)" (愛をこめて花束を, "Put Love in a Bouquet")	Ochi, Tabo, Junji Ishiwatari		4:08
Total length:				71:37

DVD: 5th Album White Release Kinenbi free live at Ōsaka-jō Nishinomaru Kōen
No.	Title	Length
1.	"White Light"	5:22
2.	"Tamashii Revolution" (タマシイレボリューション, "Soul Revolution")	4:09
3.	"Alright!!"	7:29
4.	"Ai o Komete Hanataba o"	5:32
5.	"Bi-Li-Li Emotion"	4:57
6.	"Manifesto" (マニフェスト Manifesuto)	6:38
7.	"Ai o Karada ni Fukikonde" (愛をからだに吹き込んで, "Breathe Love Into Your Body")	4:29
8.	"Beautiful"	6:17
9.	"On Your Side"	6:20
10.	"You You"	7:20
Total length:		71:37

== Charts ==
All positions and sales refer to the album as a part of the "Kuroi Shizuku" & Coupling Songs: 'Side B' set.

Chart (2010)	Peak position
Japan Oricon weekly albums	2

=== Sales ===
Chart	Amount
Oricon physical sales	73,000

== Release history ==
Region	Date	Format	Distributing Label	Catalog codes
Japan	December 2, 2015	2CD, 2CD/DVD, digital download (full-length)	Warner Music Japan	WPCL-12280/1, WPZL-31130/2
Japan	December 19, 2015	Rental CD (2CD)	Warner Music Japan	WPCL-12280/1
