= Kuroi Shizuku =

- The cover of "Kuroi Shizuku" and Coupling Songs: 'Side B'

Single by Superfly
- Released: November 18, 2015
- Recorded: 2015
- Genre: Pop, rock
- Length: 3:30
- Label: Warner Music Japan
- Songwriters: Shiho Ochi, Jam
- Producer: Kōichi Tsutaya

Superfly singles chronology
"On Your Side" (2015)	"Kuroi Shizuku" (2015)

"Kuroi Shizuku" (Japanese: 黒い雫; "Black Droplet") is a song by Japanese musical act Superfly. Used as the theme song for the Fuji Television medical drama Mutsū: Mieru Me, it was released as a digital single on November 18, 2015, and as a physical single on December 2 as "Kuroi Shizuku" & Coupling Songs: 'Side B', a five-song extended play packaged with a B-side compilation album as a bonus disc.

== Background and development ==
In May 2015, the fifth original album by Superfly was released, White. Taking a year to write, the album was partially recorded in Los Angeles, when vocalist Shiho Ochi traveled there to collaborate with Chris Cester, the former lead singer of Australian Jet. Superfly worked together with American songwriters Jason Hill and Bonnie McKee, as well as Japanese singer-songwriter Bonnie Pink and the poet Bin Sugawara. The album was promoted primarily with the song "Beautiful", which Ochi wrote for the Mother Game: Kanojo-tachi no Kaikyū. Released digitally on May 8, the song was a commercial success, certified Platinum by the Recording Industry Association of Japan. From July 4 to December 14, Superfly performed a 39 date tour of Japan, entitled the White Tour. Part way through the tour, Superfly released McKee's contribution to the album, the ballad "On Your Side", as a post-album single.

== Writing and inspiration ==
The large single and bonus album package was created to commemorate this release being Superfly's 20th physical single release. This was the second time Superfly had released a package like this, after the drama theme song "Wildflower" and a compilation of Western cover songs, Cover Songs: Complete Best 'Track 3', were compiled together in 2010 to commemorate Superfly's 10th physical single.

"Kuroi Shizuku" was commissioned specifically for the drama Mutsū: Mieru Me. Most of the song was written after the offer was received by vocalist Shiho Ochi, except for the chorus line, which was a pre-existing piece of music from Ochi's song stock. Unlike many of Superfly's singles, Ochi composed the entire song. She was inspired to write the song after reading the text the drama was based on, Yō Kusakabe's 2005 novel Mutsū, influenced by the mysterious atmosphere of the novel. "Kuroi Shizuku" was an exploration of Ochi's darker side that she found while recording White. During the White writing process, Ochi felt free to incorporate new influences that she had not in Superfly's first four albums, which she felt she could continue with for "Kuroi Shizuku". After experimenting with a "sexy" voice for "Iro o Hagashite" from White, Ochi felt inspired to sing in a "wicked woman" voice for "Kuroi Shizuku".

== Promotion and release ==
On November 18, "Kuroi Shizuku" was released as a stand-alone digital download. Two weeks later, two physical editions of the single were released: the two-CD edition featuring the five-track "Kuroi Shizuku" single with Coupling Songs: 'Side B', as well as a two-CD and DVD edition, additionally featuring a visual recording of Superfly's free live performance at Ōsaka-jō Nishinomaru Kōen on May 30. The "Kuroi Shizuku" single features a cover of Arrows' "I Love Rock 'n' Roll" (1975), which features a guest appearance by the Arrows' member and songwriter Alan Merrill on guitar, who traveled to Tokyo to record his part. Also featured on the single are live recordings of the songs "Beautiful" and "On Your Side" from Superfly's performance at the Tokyo International Forum in September 2015.

The cover artwork was inspired by the title of the song, and features black liquid droplets falling from Ochi's own hair; a recording process that took over two hours to photograph. Ochi wears a dress created from vintage kimono cloth in the cover artwork.

== Music video ==
The music video was directed by Atsunori Toshi, and was shot in a single 17-hour shoot. It was unveiled publicly on November 25, 2015. The video was themed around black and white, to contrast with the colorful theme of Superfly's most recent studio album, White (2015). It features Ochi doing actions out of sync with an ensemble of six masked dancers, who perform a dance incorporating tutting. Ochi is dressed in clothing similar to the clothing she wore in the cover artwork, made from the same re-purposed vintage kimono. Throughout the video, Ochi is shown with the tips of her right hand colored in black; an idea that Ochi created herself.

== Track listings ==
Digital download
No.	Title	Lyrics	Music	Arranger(s)	Length
1.	"Kuroi Shizuku"	Shiho Ochi, Jam	Ochi	Kōichi Tsutaya	3:30
Total length:					3:30

"Kuroi Shizuku" single
No.	Title	Lyrics	Music	Arranger(s)	Length
1.	"Kuroi Shizuku"	Ochi, Jam	Ochi	Tsutaya	3:30
2.	"Shin Sekai e" (新世界へ, "To the New World")	Sally#Cinnamon	Ochi, Tsutaya	Tsutaya	3:48
3.	"I Love Rock 'n' Roll"	Jake Hooker, Alan Merrill	Hooker, Merrill	Tsutaya	3:39
4.	"Beautiful (Live from Superfly White Tour 2015 at Tokyo Kokusai Forum)" (東京国際フォーラム, "Tokyo International Forum")	Sally#Cinnamon	Ochi, Tsutaya	Tsutaya	5:48
5.	"On Your Side (Live from Superfly White Tour 2015 at Tokyo Kokusai Forum)" (東京国際フォーラム, "Tokyo International Forum")	Ochi, Jam	Bonnie McKee, Michelle McCord	Tsutaya	7:05
Total length:					23:50

Coupling Songs: 'Side B' album
No.	Title	Writer(s)	Originating release	Length
1.	"Kodoku no Hyena" (孤独のハイエナ, "Lonely Hyena")	Shiho Ochi, Kōichi Tabo	"Hello Hello" (2007)	4:27
2.	"Rin" (凛, "Cold")	Ochi, Tabo	"Manifesto" (2007)	5:52
3.	"Ai to Kansha" (愛と感謝, "Love and Gratitude")	Ochi, Tabo	"Ai o Komete Hanataba o" (2008)	4:28
4.	"Perfect Lie"	Ochi, Kōichi Tsutaya	"How Do I Survive?" (2008)	3:56
5.	"Welcome to the Rockin' Show"	Tabo	"My Best of My Life" (2009)	3:21
6.	"Rescue Me"	Ochi, Tabo	"Eyes on Me" (2010)	4:09
7.	"Prima Donna" (プリマドンナ Purimadonna)	Ochi, Tabo	"Eyes on Me" (2010)	3:17
8.	"Different Ways"	Ochi	"Beep!!" / "Sunshine Sunshine" (2010)	3:40
9.	"I My Me Mine Mine"	Ochi	"Ai o Kurae" (2011)	2:38
10.	"28" (Nijūhachi)	Ochi, Tabo	"Kagayaku Tsuki no Yō ni" / "The Bird Without Wings" (2010)	4:16
11.	"Owarinaki Game" (終わりなきゲーム, "Endless Game")	Ochi, Tabo	"Force" (2012)	3:53
12.	"Tōmei Ningen" (透明人間, "Invisible Man")	Ochi, Tabo	"Force" (2012)	4:38
13.	"Mangekyō to Chō" (万華鏡と蝶, "The Kaleidoscope and the Butterfly")	Jam, Ochi	"Live" (2014)	3:56
14.	"The Long Way Home"	Ochi, Jam, Tsutaya	"Live" (2014)	5:03
15.	"You You"	Ochi, Jam, Tsutaya	"Ai o Karada ni Fukikonde" (2014)	4:40
16.	"Closet" (クローゼット Kurōzetto)	Ochi, Jam, Tsutaya	"Ai o Karada ni Fukikonde" (2014)	5:15
17.	"Ai o Komete Hanataba o (Piano Ver.)" (愛をこめて花束を, "Put Love in a Bouquet")	Ochi, Tabo, Junji Ishiwatari		4:08
Total length:				71:37

DVD: 5th Album White Release Kinenbi Free Live at Ōsaka-jō Nishinomaru Kōen
No.	Title	Length
1.	"White Light"	5:22
2.	"Tamashii Revolution" (タマシイレボリューション, "Soul Revolution")	4:09
3.	"Alright!!"	7:29
4.	"Ai o Komete Hanataba o"	5:32
5.	"Bi-Li-Li Emotion"	4:57
6.	"Manifesto" (マニフェスト Manifesuto)	6:38
7.	"Ai o Karada ni Fukikonde" (愛をからだに吹き込んで, "Breathe Love Into Your Body")	4:29
8.	"Beautiful"	6:17
9.	"On Your Side"	6:20
10.	"You You"	7:20
Total length:		71:37

== Chart rankings ==
Chart (2015)	Peak position
Japan Billboard Japan Hot 100	4
Japan Oricon weekly albums: "Kuroi Shizuku" & Coupling Songs: 'Side B'	2

=== Sales ===
Chart	Amount
Oricon physical sales: "Kuroi Shizuku" & Coupling Songs: 'Side B'	73,000

== Release history ==
Region	Date	Format	Distributing Label	Catalog codes
Japan	November 18, 2015	digital download	Warner Music Japan	—N/a
Japan	December 2, 2015	2CD, 2CD/DVD, digital download (full-length)	Warner Music Japan	WPCL‐12280/1, WPZL-31130/2
Japan	December 19, 2015	Rental CD (2CD)	Warner Music Japan	WPCL‐12280/1
