= Dancing at Budokan!! =

Video by Superfly
- Released: April 28, 2010
- Recorded: December 14, 2009
- Genre: Pop-rock
- Length: 240 min.
- Label: Warner Music Japan
- Producer: Kōichi Tsutaya

Superfly chronology
Rock'N'Roll Show 2008 (2009)	Dancing at Budokan!! (2010)	Shout in the Rainbow!! (2012)

Dancing at Budokan!! is a DVD/BD set and live album released by Japanese recording artist Superfly. The performances featured are from Superfly's December 14, 2009, concert at the Nippon Budokan arena in Tokyo, all recorded on the first DVD/BD. The second DVD/BD features footage of Shiho Ochi's performance with Big Brother and the Holding Company at the Bethel Woods Center for the Arts stop on the Heroes of Woodstock Tour, an interview on her album Box Emotions, and the live performances at the Roppongi Hills Arena free concert. The limited edition DVD bundle includes a two CD album of the Budokan concert. On the Oricon music DVD charts, it peaked at #7 while on the charts for 7 weeks.

== Track list ==
DVD/BD 1
No.	Title	Length
1.	"Hi-Five"
2.	"Koisuru Hitomi wa Utsukushii" (恋する瞳は美しい, "Loving Eyes Are Beautiful")
3.	"Hanky Panky"
4.	"Hello Hello" (ハロー・ハロー Harō Haro)
5.	"Yasashii Kimochi de" (やさしい気持ちで "With Tender Feelings")
6.	"Kodoku no Hyena" (孤独のハイエナ Kodoku no Haiena, "Lonely Hyena")
7.	"My Best of My Life"
8.	"Rin" (凛, "Cold")
9.	"Last Love Song"
10.	"Ai o Komete Hanataba o" (愛をこめて花束を, "Flowers With Love")
11.	"How Do I Survive?"
12.	"Tanjō" (誕生, "Birth")
13.	"See You"
14.	"Alright!!"
15.	"Uso to Romance" (嘘とロマンス Uso to Romansu, "Lies and Romance")
16.	"Ain't No Crybaby"
17.	"Dancing on the Fire"
18.	"Manifesto" (マニフェスト Manifesuto)
19.	"Piece of My Heart"
20.	"I Remember"

DVD/BD 2
No.	Title	Length
1.	"Down On Me" (Woodstock 40th Anniversary Festival)
2.	"Piece of My Heart" (Woodstock 40th Anniversary Festival)
3.	"Box Emotions interview"
4.	"Alright!!" (Roppongi Hills Arena Free Live)
5.	"How Do I Survive?" (Roppongi Hills Arena Free Live)
6.	"Yasashii Kimochi de" (Roppongi Hills Arena Free Live)
7.	"Ai o Komete Hantaba o" (Roppongi Hills Arena Free Live)
8.	"Koisuru Hitomi wa Utsukushii" (Roppongi Hills Arena Free Live)
9.	"My Best Of My Life" (Roppongi Hills Arena Free Live)

CD1
No.	Title	Length
1.	"Opening Session"
2.	"Hi-Five"
3.	"Koisuru Hitomi wa Utsukushii"
4.	"Hanky Panky"
5.	"Hello Hello"
6.	"Yasashii Kimochi de"
7.	"MC"
8.	"Kodoku no Hyena"
9.	"My Best Of My Life"
10.	"Rin"
11.	"Last Love Song"
12.	"Ai o Komete Hanataba o"

CD2
No.	Title	Length
1.	"How Do I Survive?"
2.	"Tanjō"
3.	"See You"
4.	"Alright!!"
5.	"Uso to Romance"
6.	"Ain't No Crybaby"
7.	"Dancing On The Fire"
8.	"MC 2" (Encore)
9.	"Manifesto" (Encore)
10.	"MC 3" (Encore)
11.	"Piece of My Heart" (Encore)
12.	"MC 4" (Encore)
13.	"I Remember" (Encore)

=== iTunes Store EP ===
Prior to the release of Dancing at Budokan!!, the iTunes Store released an EP of four of the songs off of the DVD. On the DVD's release date, iTunes released another version of the EP that included the songs from the first with four video recordings from the DVD.

Live EP
No.	Title	Length
1.	"Kodoku no Hyena"
2.	"How Do I Survive?"
3.	"Tanjō"
4.	"Manifesto"

Live EP (Video Version)
No.	Title	Length
1.	"Koisuru Hitomi wa Utsukushii"
2.	"My Best of My Life"
3.	"Alright!!"
4.	"Dancing on the Fire"
