= The Bird Without Wings =

- "Kagayaku Tsuki no Yō ni" / "The Bird Without Wings" single cover

Single by Superfly

from the album Force
- Released: August 15, 2012
- Recorded: 2012
- Genre: Pop, rock
- Length: 5:26
- Label: Warner Music Japan
- Songwriters: Shiho Ochi, Kōichi Tabo
- Producer: Kōichi Tsutaya

Superfly singles chronology
"Stars" (2012)	"The Bird Without Wings" (2012)	"Force" (2012)

"The Bird Without Wings" is a song by Japanese musical act Superfly. It was released as a double A-side single along with "Kagayaku Tsuki no Yō ni" on August 15, 2012. It was used as the theme song for the film Ushijima the Loan Shark.

== Background and development ==
Superfly's fourth album Force was first announced on April 4, during a live streaming concert broadcast on Ustream and Niconico Douga. In July 2012, Superfly released "Stars", a collaboration with Ulfuls lead singer Tortoise Matsumoto that was recorded for Fuji Television's coverage of the 2012 Summer Olympics.

The song was announced as the theme song of the film version of Ushijima the Loan Shark on June 20, 2012. Vocalist Shiho Ochi based the song's lyrics on the film, and gave the song a "fighting anxiety" theme. Ochi was inspired to write about people moving on in their lives despite their own handicaps and anxieties. The song's release as a double A-side single was announced on June 21, 2012.

In 2014, for the film's sequel, Superfly was enlisted again, and the musical unit released the song "Live" for the theme song.

== Music video ==
A music video was produced for the song, directed by Shūichi Banba. It features Ochi singing the song on a wooden structure on a plain, as well as scenes showing a frenetically moving man on the same plain.

== Critical reception ==
Dai Tanaka of Rockin' on Japan praised the song's allegorical lyrical style, and felt that "The Bird Without Wings" was one of the stand-out songs on Force, calling it a "wonderful song that gives you the courage to accept yourself as you are". CDJournal reviewers described the song as a rock song that has a comfortable tempo with a lightly developing structure, and similarly praised the song's message. Aki Ito of EMTG praised the song for its comfortable and honest melody, and felt that the center of both this song and "Kagayaku Tsuki no Yō ni" was Ochi's bold and expressive voice. She noted the song's strong blues rock-sound, and felt that the guitar backing added to the song's distinctiveness.

== Track listing ==
All music is composed by Koichi Tabo, arranged by Koichi Tsutaya.

No.	Title	Lyrics	Length
1.	"Kagayaku Tsuki no Yō ni" (輝く月のように, "Like the Shining Moon")	Shiho Ochi, jam	5:26
2.	"The Bird Without Wings"	Shiho Ochi	5:01
3.	"28" (Nijūhachi)	Shiho Ochi	4:12
Total length:			14:39

Limited edition DVD
No.	Title	Length
1.	"Hello Hello" ("Superfly tv" Studio Live 2012.4.4)
2.	"Sasurai no Tabibito" ("Superfly tv" Studio Live 2012.4.4)
3.	"Heisei Homo Sapiens" ("Superfly tv" Studio Live 2012.4.4)
4.	"Ai o Komete Hanataba o" ("Superfly tv" Studio Live 2012.4.4)

== Chart rankings ==
Chart (2012)	Peak position
Japan Oricon weekly singles: "Kagayaku Tsuki no Yō ni" / "The Bird Without Wings"	6

=== Sales ===
Chart	Amount
Oricon physical sales: "Kagayaku Tsuki no Yō ni" / "The Bird Without Wings"	29,000

== Release history ==
Region	Date	Format	Distributing Label	Catalog codes
Japan	August 1, 2012	ringtone	Warner Music Japan	
Japan	August 15, 2012	CD single, CD/DVD, digital download	Warner Music Japan	WPCL-11185, WPZL-30427
Japan	September 1, 2012	Rental CD	Warner Music Japan	WPCL-11185
