= Yasashii Kimochi de =

Single by Superfly

from the album Box Emotions
- Released: July 22, 2009
- Recorded: 2009
- Genre: Pop, rock
- Length: 4:07
- Label: Warner Music Japan
- Songwriters: Shiho Ochi, Kōichi Tabo
- Producers: Kōichi Tabo, Kōichi Tsutaya

Superfly singles chronology
"Alright!!" (2009)	"Yasashii Kimochi de" (2009)	"Dancing on the Fire" (2009)

"Yasashii Kimochi de" (Japanese: やさしい気持ちで; "With Tender Feelings") is a song by Japanese musical act Superfly. It was released as a double A-side single along with "Koisuru Hitomi wa Utsukushii" in 2009, a month before Superfly's second studio album Box Emotions.

== Background and development ==
In 2009, Superfly recorded two songs for the Fuji Television drama Boss, starring Yūki Amami. The theme song, a ballad called "My Best of My Life", was released as a single by Superfly on May 13. The drama's upbeat opening theme song "Alright!!" was released as a digital single a month later. Both songs were successful commercially, with "Alright!!" becoming Superfly's biggest hit since "Ai o Komete Hanataba o" (2008).

== Promotion and release ==
The song was used as the theme song of the morning news program Mezamashi TV, first airing in April 2009. Superfly performed the song live at Music Station on September 4, during the release of Box Emotions.

The song was released as a part of a four-track single on July 29, 2009. In addition to the two A-sides, the single featured a cover of Kuwata Band's 1986 song "Skipped Beat", a song Superfly had performed at Bokura no Ongaku and during her Rock'N'Roll Show 2008 tour. The song is a live recording taken from the tour final of the Rock'N'Roll Show at the NHK Hall on November 9, 2008. The remaining track is a cover of the title track from Jackson Browne's 1974 album Late for the Sky.

== Music video ==
A music video was produced for the song, directed by Shūichi Banba. It features Ochi in a top-hat, performing the song with her band-mates on an outdoor stage in country-inspired clothing. As she sings, stage hands and other performers, such as a man with a dog and a man dressed as a pole, greet her as they leave the stage. At the end of the video, Ochi and her band-mates run off the stage to reveal the field the video was shot in, and dance with all of the other performers.

== Critical reception ==
Dai Tanaka of Rockin' On Japan described the song as being exactly like the title implied, "tender emotion" on top of a "good melody". He praised Ochi's musicianship, feeling that the single was an example of her skill as a vocalist. The song was received well by CDJournal reviewers, who noted the song's dramatic classic pop style and praising the melody's development and the lyrics. One reviewer felt the song was a simple, refreshing medium rock song on their first listen, but later felt the layered acoustic guitar sound was ambitious. The song was praised as having a "weighty tone" and a "beautiful melody" that was "tenderly sung", with the reviewers noting that listening to it felt "good like a spring breeze".

== Track listings ==
"Yasashii Kimochi de" digital download
No.	Title	Lyrics	Music	Arranger(s)	Length
1.	"Yasashii Kimochi de"	Shiho Ochi	Kōichi Tabo	K. Tabo, Kōichi Tsutaya	4:07
Total length:					4:07

"Koisuru Hitomi wa Utsukushii" / "Yasashii Kimochi de" single
No.	Title	Lyrics	Music	Arranger(s)	Length
1.	"Koisuru Hitomi wa Utsukushii" (恋する瞳は美しい, "Loving Eyes Are Beautiful")	Shiho Ochi	K. Tabo	K. Tsutaya	4:42
2.	"Yasashii Kimochi de"	S. Ochi	K. Tabo	K. Tabo, K. Tsutaya	4:07
3.	"Skipped Beat (Live From NHK Hall)" (スキップ・ビート (Live From NHK Hall) Sukippu Bīto)	Keisuke Kuwata	K. Kuwata	K. Tsutaya	4:08
4.	"Late for the Sky"	Jackson Browne	J. Browne	K. Tsutaya	5:33
Total length:					18:28

== Personnel ==
Personnel details were sourced from the liner notes booklet of Box Emotions.

- Gen Ittetsu Strings – strings
- Kōji Kusakari – electric guitar, acoustic guitar
- Hideki Matsubara – bass
- Hiroshi "Matsukichi" Matsubara – drums
- Shiho Ochi – lead and background vocals, timpani, tambourine
- Takumi Sone – acoustic guitar
- Kōichi Tabo – acoustic guitar
- Kōichi Tsutaya – piano
- Yoshiyuki Yatsuhashi – electric guitar, acoustic guitar

== Charts and sales ==
Chart (2009)	Peak position
Japan Billboard Adult Contemporary Airplay	18
Japan Billboard Japan Hot 100	61
Japan Oricon weekly singles: "Koisuru Hitomi wa Utsukushii" / "Yasashii Kimochi de"	6
Japan RIAJ Digital Track Chart	11

=== Sales and certifications ===
Chart	Amount
Oricon physical sales: "Koisuru Hitomi wa Utsukushii" / "Yasashii Kimochi de"	23,000
RIAJ download certification	Platinum (250,000)

== Release history ==
Region	Date	Format	Distributing Label	Catalog codes
Japan	July 15, 2007	ringtone	Warner Music Japan	
Japan	July 22, 2007	digital download	Warner Music Japan	
Japan	July 29, 2007	CD single, digital download (EP)	Warner Music Japan	WPCL-10730
