= Dancing on the Fire =

Single by Superfly
- Released: November 18, 2009
- Genre: Pop, rock
- Label: Warner Music Japan
- Songwriters: Shiho Ochi, Kōichi Tabo

Superfly singles chronology
"Koisuru Hitomi wa Utsukushii" (2009)	"Dancing on the Fire" (2009)	"Wildflower" (2010)

Music video
- "Dancing on the Fire" at YouTube

"Dancing on the Fire" is a single by Japanese rock act Superfly, the group's ninth single overall. Released on November 18, 2009, "Dancing on the Fire" is Superfly's first single after the release of their second album Box Emotions. The title track was used in commercials for Canon's IXY Digital 930 IS camera.

== Overview ==
The song peaked at 7 on the Oricon weekly charts, only the second of Superfly's singles to break the Oricon's top 10, while remaining on the charts for 10 weeks, and was designated as the number 22 song for the month of November 2009. "Dancing on the Fire" fared better on the Billboard Japan Hot 100, reaching number 6, and the song's music video was also awarded the VMAJ for Best Rock Video in 2010. The B-sides to the single include a live version of "Alright!!" performed at a free release party for Box Emotions at the Roppongi Hills Arena and a cover of Carole King's "(You Make Me Feel Like) A Natural Woman". "A Natural Woman" was later used as the theme song for the 2010 release of the film Tokyo-jima. The limited edition release of the single included a DVD that featured a recording of the Box Emotions release concert at the Roppongi Hills Arena. A live rendition of "Dancing on the Fire" appears in the Dancing at Budokan!! live DVD and album. The track is not featured on any of Superfly's subsequent studio albums, but its music video will be included on the DVD packaged with Mind Travel.

In March 2015, the song was certified for 100,000 digital downloads in Japan, five and a half years after its release.

== Track listing ==
No.	Title	Lyrics	Music	Arranger(s)	Length
1.	"Dancing on the Fire"	Shiho Ochi	Kōichi Tabo	K. Tabo, Kōichi Tsutaya	4:14
2.	"Alright!!" (9.2 Free Live at Roppongi Hills Arena)	S. Ochi	K. Tabo, S. Ochi	K. Tabo	4:32
3.	"(You Make Me Feel Like) A Natural Woman" (Originally by Aretha Franklin)	Gerry Goffin, Carole King, Jerry Wexler	G. Goffin, C. King, J. Wexler		3:19
Total length:					12:03

Limited edition DVD (9.2 Free Live at Roppongi Hills Arena)
No.	Title	Length
1.	"Alright!!"
2.	"How Do I Survive?"
3.	"Yasashii Kimochi de"
4.	"Ai o Komete Hanataba o"
5.	"Koisuru Hitomi wa Utsukushii"
6.	"My Best of My Life"
