= Koisuru Hitomi wa Utsukushii =

2009 single by Superfly

Single by Superfly

from the album Box Emotions
- Released: July 22, 2009
- Recorded: 2009
- Genre: Pop, rock, disco, funk
- Length: 4:42
- Label: Warner Music Japan
- Songwriters: Shiho Ochi, Kōichi Tabo
- Producer: Kōichi Tsutaya

Superfly singles chronology
"Alright!!" (2009)	"Koisuru Hitomi wa Utsukushii" (2009)	"Dancing on the Fire" (2009)

"Koisuru Hitomi wa Utsukushii" (Japanese: 恋する瞳は美しい; "Loving Eyes Are Beautiful") is a song by Japanese musical act Superfly. It was released as a double A-side single along with "Yasashii Kimochi de" in 2009, a month before Superfly's second studio album Box Emotions. An upbeat disco-inspired song that was a change in style from her previous sound, the song was used in commercials for Canon's Digital IXUS cameras in Japan.

== Background and development ==
In 2009, Superfly recorded two songs for the Fuji Television drama Boss, starring Yūki Amami. The theme song, a ballad called "My Best of My Life", was released as a single by Superfly on May 13. The drama's upbeat opening theme song "Alright!!" was released as a digital single a month later. Both songs were successful commercially, with "Alright!!" becoming Superfly's biggest hit since "Ai o Komete Hanataba o" (2008).

== Promotion and release ==
The song was first unveiled in late February 2009, when it was used in commercials promoting Canon's Digital IXUS brand of cameras. Superfly's next single "Dancing on the Fire" (2009) followed "Koisuru Hitomi wa Utsukushii" as the second song used for this commercial campaign, which was created in the same style as "Koisuru Hitomi wa Utsukushii". Superfly performed the song live at Music Station on August 7, and again at Music Japan on September 13.

The song was released as a part of a four-track single on July 29, 2009. In addition to the two A-sides, the single featured a cover of Kuwata Band's 1986 song "Skipped Beat", a song Superfly had performed at Bokura no Ongaku and during her Rock'N'Roll Show 2008 tour. The song is a live recording taken from the tour final of the Rock'N'Roll Show at the NHK Hall on November 9, 2008. The remaining track is a cover of the title track from Jackson Browne's 1974 album Late for the Sky.

== Music video ==
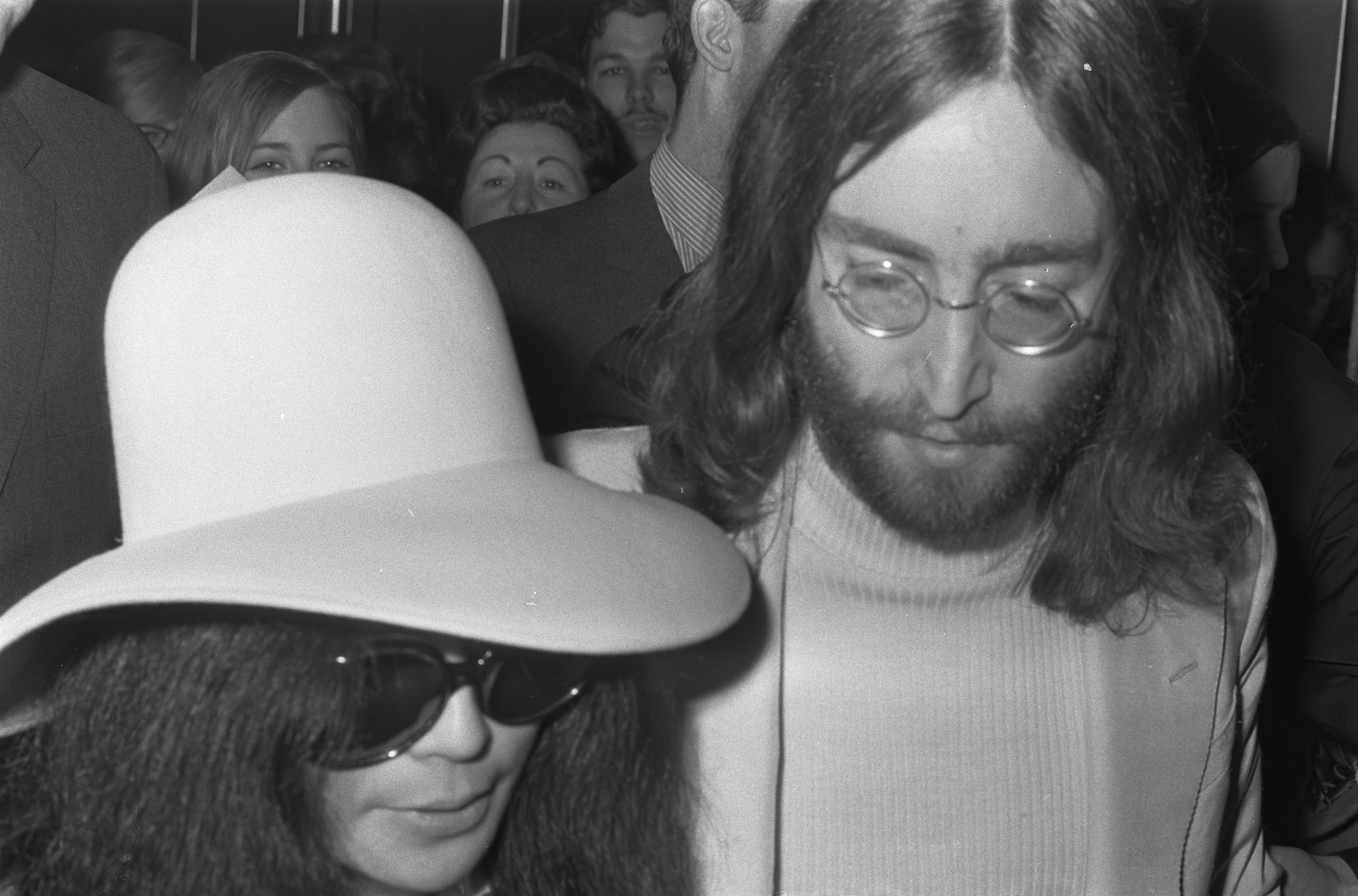
Scenes from the music video were inspired by the clothing of Yoko Ono and John Lennon.

A music video was produced for the song, directed by Shūichi Banba. The video is composed of two different scenes. The first features vocalist Shiho Ochi performing the song against a sparkly stage, alongside her bandmates surrounded by mirrorballs. The second is shot outside in sepia tones, featuring Ochi walking beside a man in a white suit. The final scenes show the couple walking into the club where Ochi is performing the song on stage, and they begin to dance.

The clothing used in the couple scenes was inspired by the clothing that Yoko Ono and John Lennon wore in the 1970s.

== Critical reception ==
Dai Tanaka of Rockin' On Japan described the song as "funky and dance-able", with a "cool vibe", feeling it was "full of punch" and refined pop music. He praised Ochi's musicianship, feeling that the single was an example of her skill as a vocalist. The song was received well by CDJournal reviewers, who described the song as an "exhilarating upper dance tune" with a "'80s four-on-the-floor disco beat with rock guitar riffs". They praised the song's "catchy" chorus and lyrics, along with Ochi's "cool" "piercing, soulful vocals".

== Track listings ==
"Koisuru Hitomi wa Utsukushii" digital download
No.	Title	Lyrics	Music	Arranger(s)	Length
1.	"Koisuru Hitomi wa Utsukushii"	Shiho Ochi	Kōichi Tabo	Kōichi Tsutaya	4:42
Total length:					4:42

"Koisuru Hitomi wa Utsukushii" / "Yasashii Kimochi de" single
No.	Title	Lyrics	Music	Arranger(s)	Length
1.	"Koisuru Hitomi wa Utsukushii"	S. Ochi	K. Tabo	K. Tsutaya	4:42
2.	"Yasashii Kimochi de" (やさしい気持ちで, "With Tender Feelings")	S. Ochi	K. Tabo	K. Tabo, K. Tsutaya	4:07
3.	"Skipped Beat (Live From NHK Hall)" (スキップ・ビート (Live From NHK Hall) Sukippu Bīto)	Keisuke Kuwata	K. Kuwata	K. Tsutaya	4:08
4.	"Late for the Sky"	Jackson Browne	J. Browne	K. Tsutaya	5:33
Total length:					18:28

== Personnel ==
Personnel details were sourced from the liner notes booklet of Box Emotions.

- Kōji Kusakari – electric guitar
- Hideki Matsubara – bass
- Hiroshi "Matsukichi" Matsubara – drums
- Shiho Ochi – lead and background vocals
- Kōichi Tabo – background vocals
- Kōichi Tsutaya – keyboard, programming
- Yoshiyuki Yatsuhashi – electric guitar

== Charts and sales ==
Chart (2009)	Peak position
Japan Billboard Adult Contemporary Airplay	1
Japan Billboard Japan Hot 100	6
Japan Oricon weekly singles: "Koisuru Hitomi wa Utsukushii" / "Yasashii Kimochi de"	6
Japan RIAJ Digital Track Chart	18

=== Sales and certifications ===
Chart	Amount
Oricon physical sales: "Koisuru Hitomi wa Utsukushii" / "Yasashii Kimochi de"	23,000
RIAJ cellphone download certification	Gold (100,000)
RIAJ PC download certification	Gold (100,000)

== Release history ==
Region	Date	Format	Distributing Label	Catalog codes
Japan	July 2, 2007	ringtone	Warner Music Japan	
Japan	July 22, 2007	digital download	Warner Music Japan	
Japan	July 29, 2007	CD single, digital download (EP)	Warner Music Japan	WPCL-10730
