= Ai o Karada ni Fukikonde =

Single by Superfly

from the album White
- B-side: "You You", "Closet"
- Released: November 19, 2014
- Genre: J-pop
- Length: 4:23
- Label: Warner Music Group
- Songwriter(s): Junji Ishiwatari, Tomoya.S, Shiho Ochi

Superfly singles chronology
| "Live" (2014) | "Ai o Karada ni Fukikonde" (2014) | "White Light" (2015) |

"Ai o Karada ni Fukikonde" (愛をからだに吹き込んで; "Breathe Love Into Your Body") is a song by Japanese pop-rock act Superfly. It was released as the group's 18th single on November 19, 2014.

== Background ==
"Ai o Karada ni Fukikonde" was recorded to be used as the theme song for the third season of TV Asahi's television drama Doctor-X: Surgeon Michiko Daimon. A digital single was released on October 9, 2014, which coincided with the third-season premiere. Superfly's Shiho Ochi said of the song that she wanted to present both sides of the character of the protagonist of Doctor X in the song, presenting a woman who is both strong but compassionate. It was later announced that there would be a 20 thousand limited edition pressing of the single which would include a DVD of Superfly's performances on Fuji Television's Bokura no Ongaku program. The single's B-sides would be the songs "You You" and "Closet". The cover artwork for "Ai o Karada ni Fukikonde" was released on October 23, 2014, showing Ochi in black and white make-up, in order to continue the song's theme of showing a woman who is both strong and tender. The song's music video was released to YouTube on November 6, 2014. The video features various monochrome patterend curtains and backup dancers performing the Lindy Hop which was described as adding to the already uplifting and dynamic song.

The single's artwork was one of the fifty works entered into the shortlist for the 2015 Music Jacket Award committee.

== Chart performance ==
"Ai o Karada ni Fukikonde" debuted on the Oricon Weekly Singles Charts at number 12 and on the Billboard Japan Hot 100 at number 23. Between October 2014 and February 2015, the song managed to sell 100,000 legal paid downloads, becoming certified gold by the RIAJ.

== Track listing ==
| No. | Title | Lyrics | Music | Length |
|---|---|---|---|---|
| 1. | "Ai o Karada ni Fukikonde" (愛をからだに吹き込んで, "Breathe Love Into Your Body") | Junji Ishiwatari | Tomoya.S, Shiho Ochi | 4:23 |
| 2. | "You You" | Ochi, jam | Ochi, Koichi Tsutaya | 4:39 |
| 3. | "Closet" (クローゼット Kurōzetto) | Ochi, jam | Ochi, Tsutaya | 5:14 |
| Total length: | | | | 14:14 |

Limited edition DVD, Bokura no Ongaku selection
| No. | Title | Length |
|---|---|---|
| 1. | "Ai o Komete Hanataba o" |
| 2. | "Alright!!" |
| 3. | "My Best of My Life" |
| 4. | "Wildflower" |
| 5. | "Tamashii Revolution" |
| 6. | "Ah" |
| 7. | "Kagayaku Tsuki no Yō ni" |
