= Stars (Superfly & Tortoise Matsumoto song) =

"STARS"

Single by Superfly & Tortoise Matsumoto
- Released: July 25, 2012
- Length: 5:49
- Songwriter: Tortoise Matsumoto
- Producer: Koichi Tsutaya

Superfly singles chronology
"Ai o Kurae" (2011)	"STARS" (2012)	"Kagayaku Tsuki no Yō ni" (2012)

Tortoise Matsumoto singles chronology
"Buranko" (2012)	"STARS" (2012)

"STARS" is a song by Superfly and Tortoise Matsumoto. The first new single from Superfly in nearly a year and her first collaboration since "I Spy I Spy" with JET.

Shiho Ochi of Superfly stated at one point that she always wanted to work with Tortoise Matsumoto of Ulfuls, and when Matsumoto was given the offer to write the theme song for Fuji Television's coverage of the 2012 Summer Olympics, he contacted Ochi to perform a duet with him. The song's theme is "universal love" to match with the global community of the Olympic Games.

In the Oricon's weekly ranking, "STARS" debuted at 15, and on the Japan Hot 100, it peaked at the number 5 spot.

== Track listing ==
All tracks are written by Tortoise Matsumoto, arranged by Koichi Tsutaya.

No.	Title	Length
1.	"STARS"	5:49
2.	"STARS" (Superfly Vocal Only)	5:49
3.	"STARS" (Tortoise Matsumoto Vocal Only)	5:49
4.	"STARS" (Instrumental)	5:46
Total length:		23:16

Limited edition DVD
No.	Title	Length
1.	""STARS" Music Video 〜Special ver.〜"
2.	"Making of Music Video"
3.	"Photo Session"
4.	"Interview about STARS"
5.	"Recording Document"
