= White (Superfly album) =

Studio album by Superfly
- Released: May 27, 2015
- Recorded: 2014–2015
- Genre: Pop, rock
- Length: 62:25
- Language: Japanese
- Label: Warner Music Japan

Superfly chronology
Superfly Best (2013)	White (2015)	Coupling Songs: 'Side B' (2015)

Singles from White
- 1. "Live" Released: May 14, 2014; 2. "Ai o Karada ni Fukikonde" Released: November 19, 2014; 3. "White Light" Released: January 21, 2015; 4. "On Your Side" Released: July 29, 2015

White (stylized as WHITE) is the fifth studio album by Japanese band Superfly. It was released on May 27, 2015.

== Background and development ==
After the release of Superfly's fourth album Force in 2012, the group released Superfly Best (2013), a two CD album compiling singles released since 2007, as well as three new compositions, including the theme song for the second series of the Asahi TV drama, Doctor X. The album was commercially successful, becoming Superfly's sixth consecutive number one album.

In 2014, Superfly released two singles, "Live" and "Ai o Karada ni Fukikonde". The former was used as the theme song for the film Ushijima the Loan Shark, while the latter was used as the theme song for the third season of the drama Doctor X. This was followed by a digital single in January 2015 called "White Light", a song written for the game Tales of Zestiria. Of the three preceding singles, "Ai o Karada ni Fukikonde" was the most commercially successful, becoming certified gold by the RIAJ for 100,000 paid downloads.

The album's concept was one of change, which was illustrated in the cover artwork, where vocalist Shiho Ochi wears a white-colored wig and is smeared with different colors of paints. The white color of the album is intended to symbolize Superfly's past standards and colors, with the colored paint representing the new possibilities in Superfly's future music.

White took a year to create. In early February, Ochi traveled to Los Angeles to record "A Ha Ha" at EastWest Studios, a song produced by Chris Cester, the former lead singer of Australian Jet, who Superfly collaborated with in 2007 on the single "I Spy I Spy". Other Western collaborators on the album include Jason Hill of the American band Louis XIV, and singer-songwriters Michele McCord and Bonnie McKee, who wrote many of the singles from Katy Perry's Teenage Dream (2010) and Prism (2013) albums. Japanese musicians Yuji Nakada of the band Tsubakiya Shijūsō, Tomoya.S and Sally#Cinnamon of Heavenstamp and singer-songwriter Bonnie Pink worked on the album, as well as poet Bin Sugawara.

== Promotion and release ==
"Live" was a song released as the theme song for the 2012 film Ushijima the Loan Shark Part 2, while "Ai o Karada ni Fukikonde" was used as the theme song of season three of the drama by TV Asahi, Doctor-X: Surgeon Michiko Daimon''. The single's B-side, "You You", was used in a radio campaign for Japan FM League, entitled JFL Presents For the Next. This campaign meant that the song reached number 29 on the Billboard Japan Hot 100.

The album was first announced in January 2015, four months before the planned release. In late March, a music video featuring recording footage for the song "A Ha Ha" was uploaded to YouTube. The song "Beautiful" was used as the theme song of the drama Mother Game: Kanojo-tachi no Kaikyū, which began airing on April 14. Drama producer Junko Arai asked Superfly to perform the theme song, because she felt that Ochi's bold voice would be able to create a powerful and exhilarating fight song she wanted for the series. The song was released digitally on May 8 as a promotional single, and managed to reach number five on the Billboard Japan Hot 100 chart.

The album features fourteen original songs, as well as a bonus extended play featuring five covers of songs by Japanese artists. The song "Sweetest Music" features vocals by Mariya Takeuchi, the original singer of the song, who released it in 1980. On May 13, Superfly performed on the NHK music program Songs, performing several songs from White, while also collaborating with boyband SMAP on their television program SMAP x SMAP on May 25 to perform songs from the album. Her annual album release free live concert was held at the Nishinomaru Garden next to Osaka Castle on May 30, her first free concert held in Osaka. Superfly embarked on a national tour of Japan, entitled Superfly White Tour 2015. The tour began on July 4 at the Kawaguchi Lilia Cultural Center and featured 39 performances until December, including two performances at the Nagoya Congress Center, the Niigata Prefectural Civic Center, Festival Hall, Osaka and the Tokyo International Forum. Superfly's performance at the Nitori Culture Hall in Sapporo on October 8 was postponed due to the effects of Severe Tropical Storm Choi-wan, and was held two months later on December 14 instead.

The song "On Your Side" was used to promote the Japanese High School Baseball Championship in 2015 on Asahi Broadcasting Corporation TV and radio programs. It was released as a single from the album on July 29.

== Track listings ==
No.	Title	Lyrics	Music	Length
1.	"White Light"	Shiho Ochi, Jam	S. Ochi, Kōichi Tsutaya	4:44
2.	"Beautiful"	S. Ochi	S. Ochi, K. Tsutaya	4:54
3.	"Iro o Hagashite" (色を剥がして, "Strip Off the Colors")	Chihiro	Tomoya.S, S. Ochi, K. Tsutaya	4:45
4.	"On Your Side"	S. Ochi, Jam	Bonnie McKee, Michelle McCord	5:36
5.	"A Ha Ha"	Junji Ishiwatari	Chris Cester	3:06
6.	"Woman"	Bonnie Pink	Bonnie Pink	3:55
7.	"Datsugoku no Kisetsu" (脱獄の季節, "Prison Break Season")	Sally#Cinnamon	C. Cester	4:16
8.	"Libido ni Tsugu" (リビドーに告ぐ, "Announce My Libido")	Yuji Nakada	Y. Nakada	4:22
9.	"Ai o Karada ni Fukikonde" (愛をからだに吹き込んで, "Breathe Love into Your Body")	J. Ishiwatari	Tomoya.S, S. Ochi	4:20
10.	"Live"	S. Ochi, Bun Onoe	Kōichi Tabo	4:44
11.	"Space"	Tomoya.S	Tomoya.S	5:46
12.	"Gokusaishiki Heartbeat" (極彩色ハートビート, "Deeply Colored Heartbeat")	Sally#Cinnamon	S. Ochi	3:51
13.	"You You"	S. Ochi, Jam	S. Ochi, K. Tsutaya	4:36
14.	"Itsuka Watashi wa Uta o Utau" (いつか私は歌をうたう, "One Day I'll Sing a Song")	Bin Sugawara	K. Tsutaya	3:30
Total length:				62:25

Limited edition cover disc
No.	Title	Lyrics	Music	Original artist	Length
1.	"Blue (Konna Yoru ni wa Odorenai)" (Blue ～こんな夜には踊れない, "I Can't Dance on Nights Like This")	K. Kuwata	K. Kuwata	Keisuke Kuwata (1988)	5:29
2.	"Sweetest Music"	David Lasley	Peter Allen	Mariya Takeuchi (1980)	3:49
3.	"Kaerenai Futari" (帰れない二人, "Us, Who Can't Go Back")	Y. Inoue, Kiyoshiro Imawano	Y. Inoue, K. Imawano	Yōsui Inoue (1973)	4:14
4.	"Slow Ballad (Live at Rising Sun Rock Festival 2012)" (スローバラード Surō Barādo)	K. Imawano, Mikan	K. Imawano, Mikan	RC Succession (1976)	5:36
5.	"Tanoshii Toki (Fun Time)" (楽しい時 -Fun Time)	M. Sano	M. Sano	Motoharu Sano (1996)	3:46
Total length:					22:54

== Charts ==
Chart (2015)	Peak position
Japan Billboard Japan Hot Albums	1
Japan Oricon daily albums	1
Japan Oricon weekly albums	2

=== Sales and certifications ===
Chart	Amount
Oricon physical sales	171,000
RIAJ physical certification	Gold (100,000+)

== Release history ==
Region	Date	Format	Distributing Label	Catalog codes
Japan	May 27, 2015	CD, 2CD, digital download	Warner Music Japan	WPCL-12089~90, WPCL-12091
Japan	June 13, 2015	Rental CD	Warner Music Japan	WPCL-12089~90, WPCL-12091
