= White Light (Superfly song) =

Single by Superfly

from the album White
- Released: January 21, 2015
- Recorded: 2014
- Genre: Power pop
- Length: 4:48
- Label: Warner Music Japan
- Songwriters: Shiho Ochi, Kōichi Tsutaya
- Producer: Kōichi Tsutaya

Superfly singles chronology
"Ai o Karada ni Fukikonde" (2014)	"White Light" (2015)	"On Your Side" (2015)

"White Light" is a song by Japanese musical act Superfly. Used as the theme song for the Bandai Namco game Tales of Zestiria, it was released as a digital single and the leading track from Superfly's fifth studio album White on January 21, 2015.

== Background and development ==
In 2014, Superfly released two singles, "Live" and "Ai o Karada ni Fukikonde". The former was used as the theme song for the film Ushijima the Loan Shark, while the latter was used as the theme song for the third season of the drama Doctor-X: Surgeon Michiko Daimon, which starring by Ryoko Yonekura.

Superfly had previously released only one song for a game: "Eyes on Me", a song used as the Square Enix game The 3rd Birthday in 2010. Superfly vocalist Shiho Ochi was inspired to write the song's lyrics after reading the script of Tales of Zestiria, being moved the idea of enemies who respect each other, and likened it to the process of creating music with other musicians. Ochi themed the song around the idea that white was a color that was untainted by any other colors, but could be dyed with any color.

== Promotion and release ==
The song was first unveiled as the theme song of Tales of Zestiria in September 2014, when it was used in commercials promoting the game. A day before the game's release, the song was made available for purchase in Japan as a digital single. Superfly performed the song live at Music Station on January 23, and again at Music Japan on February 1.

== Music video ==
A music video was produced for the song, directed by Yutaka Kimura. It features Ochi, wearing a white coat and hat, in a white room with mirrors. Artist Ryo Matsuoka walks into the room with cans of brightly colored paint and begins to paint the mirrors with his hands. Paint increasingly covers Ochi's face, arms, and clothes as well. After the mirrors are painted, they shatter, with glass shards raining down around Ochi. She then walks out of the room, echoing the video's introductory sequence, as the song ends.

== Track listing ==
"White Light" digital download
No.	Title	Lyrics	Music	Length
1.	"White Light"	Shiho Ochi, Jam	Shiho Ochi, Kōichi Tsutaya	4:48
Total length:				4:48

== Chart rankings ==
Chart (2015)	Peak position
Japan Billboard Adult Contemporary Airplay	19
Japan Billboard Japan Hot 100	25

== Release history ==
Region	Date	Format	Distributing Label
Japan	January 21, 2015	Digital download	Warner Music Japan
