= Kagayaku Tsuki no Yō ni =

- "Kagayaku Tsuki no Yō ni" / "The Bird Without Wings" single cover

Single by Superfly

from the album Force
- Released: August 15, 2012
- Recorded: 2012
- Genre: Pop, rock
- Length: 5:26
- Label: Warner Music Japan
- Songwriters: Shiho Ochi, Kōichi Tabo
- Producer: Kōichi Tsutaya

Superfly singles chronology
"Stars" (2012)	"Kagayaku Tsuki no Yō ni" (2012)	"Force" (2012)

"Kagayaku Tsuki no Yō ni" (Japanese: 輝く月のように; "Like the Sparkling Moon") is a song by Japanese musical act Superfly. It was released as a double A-side single along with "The Bird Without Wings" on August 15, 2012. It was used as the theme song of the TBS drama Summer Rescue: Tenkū no Shinryōjo.

== Background and development ==
Superfly's fourth album Force was first announced on April 4, during a live streaming concert broadcast on Ustream and Niconico Douga. In July 2012, Superfly released "Stars", a collaboration with Ulfuls lead singer Tortoise Matsumoto that was recorded for Fuji Television's coverage of the 2012 Summer Olympics.

The song was written by Shiho Ochi and Kōichi Tabo especially for the drama Summer Rescue: Tenkū no Shinryōjo, starring Osamu Mukai and Machiko Ono. Ochi was inspired to write the lyrics for the song after reading the scrift for the drama, and decided to sing about rebirth, around a motif of the sun and the moon. Ochi described the song as being like a letter of thanks to important people in your lives. The song's release as a double A-side single was announced on June 21, 2012.

When making the song, Ochi wanted to make it the signature song on Force, as well as creating a work similar to her 2008 single "Ai o Komete Hanataba o", that had been used for her previous tie-up with a TBS drama, Edison no Haha. After creating the song, Ochi felt the song was very representative of how she felt as a person at that moment. The song, as well as much of the Force album, was inspired by someone close to Ochi who made her want to expose more of her true self.

== Promotion and release ==
As the theme song of Summer Rescue: Tenkū no Shinryōjo, the song was played during episodes of the drama, and was used in promotional activities surrounding the drama.

Superfly performed the song live at Music Station on August 24, at Bokura no Ongaku on September 21 and at NHK Songs on September 22. On the final episode of Bokura no Ongaku on September 19, 2014, Superfly returned to the program and performed "Kagayaku Tsuki no Yō ni" as well as SMAP's 2003 name "Sekai ni Hitotsu dake no Hana".

== Music video ==
A music video was produced for the song, directed by Gen Natsume. It is set in a forest at night, and features Ochi singing the song on the steps of a wooden hut. Other musicians surround her in the forest and perform the song alongside her, including a man performing on an upright piano. Additional scenes featured Ochi riding on a white horse, and Ochi staring up at the full moon.

== Critical reception ==
CDJournal reviewers described the song as a classic Superfly-style grand and emotional medium-tempo ballad. They praised the song's "beautiful" and "tender" melody, describing the chorus "like tender light on your heart". The reviewers further described Ochi's vocals as "completely intoxicating". Aki Ito of EMTG praised the song for its comfortable and honest melody, and felt that the center of both this song and "The Bird Without Wings" was Ochi's bold and expressive voice.

== Track listing ==
All music is composed by Koichi Tabo, arranged by Koichi Tsutaya.

No.	Title	Lyrics	Length
1.	"Kagayaku Tsuki no Yō ni"	Shiho Ochi, jam	5:26
2.	"The Bird Without Wings"	Shiho Ochi	5:01
3.	"28" (Nijūhachi)	Shiho Ochi	4:12
Total length:			14:39

Limited edition DVD
No.	Title	Length
1.	"Hello Hello" ("Superfly tv" Studio Live 2012.4.4)
2.	"Sasurai no Tabibito" ("Superfly tv" Studio Live 2012.4.4)
3.	"Heisei Homo Sapiens" ("Superfly tv" Studio Live 2012.4.4)
4.	"Ai o Komete Hanataba o" ("Superfly tv" Studio Live 2012.4.4)

== Charts ==
Chart (2012)	Peak position
Japan Billboard Adult Contemporary Airplay	2
Japan Billboard Japan Hot 100	3
Japan Oricon weekly singles: "Kagayaku Tsuki no Yō ni" / "The Bird Without Wings"	6

== Sales and certifications ==
Chart	Amount
Oricon physical sales: "Kagayaku Tsuki no Yō ni" / "The Bird Without Wings"	29,000
RIAJ PC download certification	Platinum (250,000)
RIAJ streaming certification	Gold (50,000,000)

== Release history ==
Region	Date	Format	Distributing Label	Catalog codes
Japan	July 9, 2012	ringtone	Warner Music Japan	
Japan	August 15, 2012	CD single, CD/DVD, digital download	Warner Music Japan	WPCL-11185, WPZL-30427
Japan	September 1, 2012	Rental CD	Warner Music Japan	WPCL-11185
