= Live (Superfly song) =

Single by Superfly

from the album White
- Released: May 14, 2014
- Recorded: 2014
- Genre: Pop-rock, blues
- Length: 4:48
- Label: Warner
- Songwriters: Shiho Ochi, Koichi Tabo

Superfly singles chronology
"Force" (2012)	"Live" (2014)	"Ai o Karada ni Fukikonde" (2014)

"Live" is a song by Japanese pop-rock act Superfly. It is the first new song by the project following their 2012 album Force, and serves as the band's 17th single. It was released on May 14, 2014, on standard and limited edition versions.

== Background ==
"Live", whose meaning and theme is "to live" (生きる, ikiru), serves as the theme song for the sequel to 2012's film adaptation of Ushijima the Loan Shark. It is described as a large-scale ballad which Superfly's vocalist and lyricist Shiho Ochi said was meant to be an inspiring piece, much like her previous collaboration with the Ushijima films' "The Bird Without Wings". The album's first B-side "Mangekyō to Chō" (万華鏡と蝶; "The Kaleidoscope and the Butterfly"), which is also used in Ushijima 2, is described as an uptempo piece with 1980s inspired guitar and synthesizer. Ochi said that the theme of this song was "psychedelic" (サイケ, saike). The third track on the release is "The Long Way Home".

The limited edition of the single will include a DVD that has a selection from Superfly's performance at the 2010 Fuji Rock Festival.

== Chart performance ==
"Live" peaked at number 8 on the Oricon Weekly Single Sales Chart and 7 on the Billboard Japan Hot 100.

== Track listing ==
No.	Title	Lyrics	Music	Length
1.	"Live"	Shiho Ochi, Bun Onoe	Koichi Tabo	4:48
2.	"Mangekyō to Chō" (万華鏡と蝶, "The Kaleidoscope and the Butterfly")	jam	Ochi	3:55
3.	"The Long Way Home"	Ochi, jam	Ochi, Koichi Tsutaya	5:01
Total length:				13:42

Limited edition DVD
No.	Title	Length
1.	"Alright!!" (Live at Fuji Rock Festival '10)
2.	"Ai o Komete Hanataba o" (Live at Fuji Rock Festival '10)
3.	"Wildflower" (Live at Fuji Rock Festival '10)
4.	"Manifesto" (Live at Fuji Rock Festival '10)
5.	"Tamashii Revolution" (Live at Fuji Rock Festival '10)
