= Rock 'n' Roll Show 2008 =

Rock'N'Roll Show 2008

Video by Superfly
- Released: April 1, 2009
- Genre: Pop-rock
- Length: 180 min.
- Label: Warner Music Japan
- Producer: Kōichi Tsutaya

Superfly chronology
Rock'N'Roll Show 2008 (2009)	Dancing at Budokan!! (2010)

Rock'N'Roll Show 2008 is the first live DVD by Japanese rock act Superfly. The two-disk box set features a recording of the NHK Hall stop on her Rock'N'Roll Show 2008 concert tour, a recording of a free concert held at Yoyogi Park, as well as Shiho Ochi's trip to San Francisco to become closer to her idol Janis Joplin by meeting with Sam Andrew and other members of Big Brother and the Holding Company. The DVD peaked at 16 on the Oricon's DVD charts, and remained on the charts for 19 weeks.

== Track listing ==
DVD 1
No.	Title	Length
1.	"Welcome To The Rockin' Show"
2.	"Manifesto" (マニフェスト Manifesuto)
3.	"1969"
4.	"Oh My Precious Time"
5.	"Hello Hello" (ハロー・ハロー Harō Harō)
6.	"My Brother Jake"
7.	"Last Love Song"
8.	"Perfect Lie"
9.	"Vancouver" (バンクーバー Bankūbā)
10.	"Ai o Komete Hanataba o" (愛をこめて花束を)
11.	"Kodoku no Hyena" (孤独のハイエナ Kodoku no Haiena)
12.	"Superfly Hyper Session 2008"
13.	"How Do I Survive?"
14.	"Uso to Romance" (嘘とロマンス Uso to Romansu)
15.	"Ain't No Crybaby"
16.	"Hi-Five"
17.	"I Remember"

DVD 2
No.	Title	Length
1.	"Interview"
2.	"Yoyogi Park Free Live"
3.	"Matsuyama Salonkitty"
4.	"Akasaka Blitz"
5.	"San Francisco"
6.	"Tour Rehearsal"
7.	"Tour Off Shot"
