= Force (song) =

Single by Superfly

from the album Force
- Released: October 31, 2012
- Genre: Pop-rock, blues
- Length: 3:31
- Label: Warner Music Japan
- Songwriters: Shiho Ochi, Koichi Tabo

Superfly singles chronology
"Kagayaku Tsuki no Yō ni" (2012)	"Force" (2012)	"Live" (2014)

"Force" is a song by Japanese rock unit Superfly. It is a song from the album of the same name, serving as its title track. It is being released as a re-cut single on October 31, 2012. The song, on its own, is used as the theme song for the TV Asahi drama Doctor X, and as a radio single reached 46 on the Billboard Japan Hot 100.

== Track listing ==
No.	Title	Lyrics	Music	Length
1.	"Force" (Single Version)	Shiho Ochi	Koichi Tabo	3:31
2.	"Owarinaki Game" (終わりなきゲーム Owarinaki Gēmu, "Endless Game")			3:53
3.	"Tōmei Ningen" (透明人間, "Invisible Man")			4:36

Limited edition DVD: 2012.09.19 Free Live at Yoyogi Park
No.	Title	Length
1.	"Force"
2.	"No Bandage"
3.	"The Bird Without Wings"
4.	"919" (Kuikku, "Quick")
5.	"Heisei Homo Sapiens" (平成ホモサピエンス Heisei Homo Sapiensu)
6.	"Alright!!"
7.	"Kagayaku Tsuki no Yō ni" (輝く月のように, "Like the Shining Moon")
8.	"Tamashii Revolution" (タマシイレボリューション Tamashii Reboryūshon)
9.	"Ai o Komete Hanataba o" (Encore) (愛をこめて花束を, "Put Love in a Bouquet")
