= Box Emotions =

Studio album by Superfly
- Released: September 2, 2009
- Recorded: 2008–2009
- Genre: Pop-rock
- Length: 55:27
- Label: Warner Music Japan
- Producer: Kōichi Tsutaya

Superfly chronology
Superfly (2008)	Box Emotions (2009)	Cover Songs: Complete Best 'Track 3' (2010)

Singles from Box Emotions
- 1. "How Do I Survive?" Released: September 10, 2008; 2. "My Best of My Life" Released: May 13, 2009; 3. "Alright!!" Released: June 3, 2009; 4. "Koisuru Hitomi wa Utsukushii" / "Yasashii Kimochi de" Released: July 29, 2009

Box Emotions is the second studio album by Japanese pop-rock band Superfly, released on September 2, 2009. It debuted at the number-one spot on the Oricon weekly album charts, making Superfly the first female artist in six years, since Chitose Hajime, to have her first two albums debut at the top of the charts. For the Japanese iTunes Store Rewind of 2009, Box Emotions was the album of the year. "Hanky Panky" was sent to radio stations as a promo single, and "Haru no Maboroshi" was sold as an album preview and pre-order bonus on the iTunes Store; it is still available as a separate single through iTunes.

To celebrate the release, Superfly held a free concert at the Roppongi Hills Arena. This was also streamed on Nico Nico Douga. Four-thousand fans showed up, and 1300 were allowed in the concert early.

== Track list ==
All lyrics are written by Shiho Ochi.

CD
No.	Title	Music	Arranger(s)	Length
1.	"Alright!!"	Kōichi Tabo, S. Ochi	K. Tabo	4:17
2.	"How Do I Survive?"	K. Tabo	Kōichi Tsutaya, K. Tabo	3:43
3.	"Searching"	Kōichi Tabo	K. Tabo	3:33
4.	"My Best of My Life"	K. Tabo	K. Tsutaya	6:12
5.	"Koisuru Hitomi wa Utsukushii" (恋する瞳は美しい, "Loving Eyes Are Beautiful")	K. Tabo	K. Tsutaya	4:38
6.	"Yasashii Kimochi de" (やさしい気持ちで, "With Tender Feelings")	K. Tabo	K. Tsutaya, K. Tabo	4:01
7.	"Bad Girl"	K. Tabo	K. Tabo	3:47
8.	"Identity no Yukue" (アイデンティティの行方 Aidentiti no Yukue, "My Identity's Whereabouts")	K. Tabo	K. Tabo	3:55
9.	"Tanjō" (誕生, "Birth")	K. Tabo	K. Tsutaya, K. Tabo	3:25
10.	"See You"	K. Tabo	K. Tsutaya, K. Tabo	4:07
11.	"Haru no Maboroshi" (春のまぼろし, "A Spring Illusion")	K. Tabo	K. Tsutaya	4:55
12.	"Hanky Panky"	K. Tabo	K. Tsutaya	3:46
13.	"Ai ni Dakarete" (愛に抱かれて, "Held by Love")	K. Tabo	K. Tsutaya	4:37

Limited Edition DVD
No.	Title	Length
1.	"How Do I Survive?" (Music video)	3:43
2.	"My Best of My Life" (Music video)	6:12
3.	"Alright!!" (Music video)	4:17
4.	"Koisuru Hitomi wa Utsukushii" (Music video)	4:38
5.	"Yasashii Kimochi de" (Music video)	4:01

== Charts ==
=== Oricon sales chart ===
Release	Oricon Chart	Peak position	Debut sales	Sales total
September 2, 2009	Daily Albums Chart	1	51,614	529,000 (2xPlatinum)
September 2, 2009	Weekly Albums Chart	1	213,956	529,000 (2xPlatinum)
September 2, 2009	Monthly Albums Chart	2	396,943	529,000 (2xPlatinum)
September 2, 2009	Yearly Albums Chart	9	481,000	529,000 (2xPlatinum)

=== Physical sales charts ===
Chart	Peak position
Billboard Japan Top Albums	1
Soundscan Albums Chart (CD+DVD)	1
Soundscan Albums Chart (CD-Only)	4
