= Tortoise Matsumoto =

Japanese singer (born 1966)

Tortoise Matsumoto (トータス松本 Tōtasu Matsumoto, born December 28, 1966, as 松本敦 Atsushi Matsumoto) is the lead singer of the Japanese guitar group, Ulfuls. He has also had a couple of acting roles in TV dramas, starting with Namida o Fuite (涙をふいて) in 2000.

Trigun character Nicholas D. Wolfwood is modeled after him.

On July 11, 2018, Matsumoto, Tamio Okuda, Kazuyoshi Saito, Yohito Teraoka (Jun Sky Walkers), Takashi Hamazaki (Flying Kids) and Yo-King (Magokoro Brothers) announced the formation of a supergroup called the Curling Sitones (カーリングシトーンズ, Kāringu Shitōnzu). Each member is a multi-instrumentalist with all of them at-least being able to provide vocals and guitar and, like the Traveling Wilburys, each uses a pseudonym featuring "Sitone". They formed for a concert on September 23, 2018, at Zepp Tokyo celebrating Teraoka's 25th anniversary as a musician.

== Discography ==
=== Albums ===
- Traveller (2003)
- First (2009)
- Myway Highway (2010)
- New Face (2012)
- Twistin' The Night Away (2012)

=== Singles ===
- "Hatsu Koi no ⁓What'sGoing On⁓ (Little feat. Tortoise Matsumoto)" (2005)
- "OhayoJapan (Ryo the Skywalker & Tortoise Matsumoto)" (2007)
- "Namida o todokete" (2008)
- "Hana no you ni Hoshi no you ni" (2008)
- "Boku ga tsuiteru" (2009)
- "Myoujou" (2009)
- "Straight (Tortoise Matsumoto song)|Straight" (2010)
- "Clear!" (2010)
- "Clear!/Dore dake no asa to yoru o ⁓shuarii samudei⁓" (2010)
- "Happy Hour" (2010)
- "Myway Highway - Single" (2009)
- "Waimokun ekaki uta" (2011)
- "Ue o muite arukou" (2011)
- "Buranko" (2012)
- "Waa!/Charidaa" (2014)
- "L-O-V-E (Fuyumi Sakamato & Tortoise Matsumoto)" (2015)
- "Main Street (Ringo Sheena & Tortoise Matsumoto)" (2017)

== Filmography ==
=== Films ===
- Yasuko, Songs of Days Past (2025), Takano
- Mission: Sorta Possible (2025)
- Who Cares?: The Movie (2025), Yōichi Kamata
- Finding My Punchline (2026), Arakawa

=== Television ===
- Mr. Brain (2009), Jotaro Nanba
- Ryōmaden (2010), John Manjirō
- Idaten (2019), Sansei Kasai
- Brothers in Arms (2026), Araki Murashige
