= Ulfuls =

Japanese rock band

- Origin: Osaka, Japan
- Genres: Alternative rock, pop rock, rock 'n' roll, funk rock, funk
- Years active: 1988–2009, 2014-present
- Labels: EMI Music Japan(1992–2007); Warner Music Japan (2007–2009), (2014-present)
- Members: Tortoise Matsumoto (Vocals); Ulful Keisuke (Guitar); John B. Chopper (Bass); Sankon Jr. (Drums)
- Website: ulfuls.com

Ulfuls (ウルフルズ, Urufuruzu) is a Japanese rock band from Osaka. The band name Ulfuls is derived from a misreading of the word "soulful," found on the cover of one of the band members' favorite records. They were signed by Toshiba-EMI in 1992, but after 15 years they transferred to Warner Music Group.

== History ==
Having debuted in 1992 with the single, "Yabure Kabure," they initially had very limited success. However, by 1996, the group experienced huge superstar fame, fueled by the singles "Guts Da Ze!!," and "Boogie Woogie '96". Their lead singer is Tortoise Matsumoto. The other members are Ulful Keisuke on guitar, John B. Chopper on bass and Sankon Jr. on drums. In 1996 they wrote the song "Sky" for the film Gamera 2: Attack of Legion. In 1999 John B. Chopper left the group, which nevertheless continued on as a three-member group. However, in 2002 Chopper returned to the group again, making it a four-member group once more. The band's song "Ryoho for you" (両方 For You) was chosen as the official theme song for the 2007 Summer Koshien baseball tournament. Their song "Baka Survivor" was used as the 2nd opening theme for the anime Bobobo-bo Bo-bobo (ボボボーボ・ボーボボ).

After being active for 21 years, Ulfuls announced they would stop touring following their "Yassa!" (ヤッサ！) outdoor concert event, held in Osaka on August 29 and 30, 2009. Although, in early 2014, the group announced that they were ending its hiatus, and released its 32nd single, "Doudemo yo Sugi" (どうでもよすぎ), in February 2014. The single was their first release in several years. Ulfuls went on to release its twelfth studio album, "One Mind", that May, to impressive sales. After the release of their 13th album, "Born To Be Wai Wai," the band released their 14th, "人生 (Life)" to commemorate their 25th anniversary.

On 19 February 2018, it was announced on their official website that Ulful Keisuke would be taking a break from the band to work on his solo career. It was also mentioned that Ulfuls would continue to produce music as a three-man band.

== Members ==
- Tortoise Matsumoto (トータス松本, Tōtasu Matsumoto; December 28, 1966 (age 59)): Lead vocals; real name Atsushi Matsumoto (松本 敦, Matsumoto Atsushi) (1988-present)
- Ulful Keisuke (ウルフル ケイスケ, Urufuru Keisuke; May 23, 1965 (age 61)): Guitar; real name Keisuke Iwamoto (岩本 圭介, Iwamoto Keisuke) (1988-2018)
- John B. Chopper (ジョン・B・チョッパー, Jon Bī Choppā; November 4, 1967 (age 58)): Bass; real name Toshihiro Kuroda (黒田 利博, Kuroda Toshihiro) (1988-1999, 2002-present)
- Sankon Jr. (サンコンJr., Sankon Junia; October 13, 1970 (age 55)): Drums; real name Hiroyuki Sako (佐子 博幸, Sako Hiroyuki) (1988-present)

== Discography ==
=== Singles ===
Title	Release date	Peak chart position
Title	Release date	Oricon
Desperate (やぶれかぶれ)	May 13, 1992	—
MacaMaca BUNBUN (マカマカBUNBUN)	May 19, 1993	—
Wonderful World (世の中ワンダフル)	October 27, 1993	—
King of Debt (借金大王)	August 31, 1994	—
Suttobasu (すっとばす)	November 16, 1994	—
Go With All Your Might! (トコトンで行こう!)	March 15, 1995	—
Osaka Strut Part II (大阪ストラット・パートII)	May 21, 1995	—
SUN SUN SUN'95	July 19, 1995	96
Guts Daze(ガッツだぜ)	December 6, 1995	6
Banzai ~I'm Glad I Like You~ (バンザイ 〜好きでよかった〜)	February 7, 1996	13
Boogie Woogie '96 (ブギウギ'96)	July 3, 1996	2
Sky (そら)	July 3, 1996	9
Komason No. 1 (コマソンNo.1)	December 11, 1996	5
That's Right! (それが答えだ!)	February 26, 1997	15
Cutie (かわいいひと)	October 8, 1997	5
Are You Happy? (しあわせですか)	December 10, 1997	18
Leave It To Me (まかせなさい)	May 13, 1998	20
Let's Play (あそぼう)	October 28, 1998	21
Young Soul Dynamite (ヤング ソウル ダイナマイト)	October 14, 1999	29
Dream (夢)	November 26, 1999	60
There's Always Tomorrow (明日があるさ)	February 16, 2001	4
Naniwa Genome ~Ulfuls Mega Mix Medley~ (ナニワゲノム 〜ウルフルズ・メガミックス・メドレー〜)	April 28, 2001	41
Daredevil ~Get Hot~/Incident! (がむしゃら 〜熱くなれ〜/事件だッ!)	October 17, 2001	15
If You Laugh (笑えれば)	February 20, 2002	10
Eenen (ええねん)	November 11, 2003	20
Idiot Survivor (バカサバイバー)	November 3, 2004	13
Go Crazy/It's OK (暴れだす/大丈夫)	January 13, 2005	10
Samurai Soul (サムライソウル)	January 2, 2006	18
Passion A Go-Go (情熱 A GO-GO)	April 18, 2007	22
Both For You/Come Cry (両方 For You/泣けてくる)	July 25, 2007	15
For Sure (たしかなこと)	October 31, 2007	28
"—" denotes releases that did not chart or were not released in that region.

=== Special release singles ===
Release date	Title	Ranking
Feb 25, 2014	Anyway, It Doesn't Matter (どうでもよすぎ)	-

=== Albums ===
	Release date	Title	Peak position
1st	June 17, 1992 (Out of Print); December 14, 1994(Re-release); January 25, 2012(Re-release)	爆発オンパレード (Bakuhatsu on Parade)	74
2nd	August 31, 1994	すっとばす (Suttobasu)	61
3rd	January 24, 1996	バンザイ (Banzai)	1
4th	March 26, 1997	Let's Go	5
5th	June 17, 1998	サンキュー・フォー・ザ・ミュージック (Thank You for the Music)	4
6th	December 8, 1999	トロフィー (Trophy)	12
7th	March 27, 2002	ウルフルズ (Ulfuls)	18
8th	December 10, 2003	ええねん (Eenen)	14
9th	February 23, 2005	9	6
10th	March 8, 2006	YOU	12
11th	December 12, 2007	KEEP ON, MOVE ON	9
12th	May 21, 2014	ONE MIND	8
13th	September 9, 2015	ボンツビワイワイ (Born to be Wai Wai)	9
14th	May 24, 2017	人生 (Life)	12
15th	June 26, 2019	ウ!!! (U!!!)	16
16th	November 9, 2022	楽しいお仕事愛好会 (Fun Work Club)	20

=== Virtual albums ===
- iTunes Originals - Ulfuls (Japanese exclusive)

=== VHS/DVD ===
- Ulful V (Ulfuls DVD)
- Ulful V Jū
- Live In Japan
- Ai Yue Ni Aa, Au Yue Ni Bakuhatsu!!
- Ulfuls Ga Yatte Kureru Yassa! Yassa! Yassa!
- Ashita Ga Aru Sa "Kaze Fukeba Shoshikantetsu" (DVD Single)
- Ulfuls Ga Yatte Kureru Yassa! Yassa! Yassassa!
- Tsū Tsū Ura Ura
- Eenen Osakan Graffiti
- Ulfuls at Budōkan
