= Force (Superfly album) =

Studio album by Superfly
- Released: September 19, 2012
- Recorded: 2011, 2012
- Genre: Pop-rock, blues
- Length: 46:42
- Label: Warner Music Japan
- Producer: Kōichi Tsutaya

Superfly chronology
Mind Travel (2011)	Force (2012)	Superfly Best (2013)

Singles from Force
- 1. "Ai o Kurae" Released: October 12, 2011; 2. "Kagayaku Tsuki no Yō ni / The Bird Without Wings" Released: August 15, 2012; 3. "Force" Released: October 31, 2012

Force is the fourth studio album by Japanese pop-rock unit Superfly. It was released on September 19, 2012. Force commemorates the group's fifth anniversary and was released in several formats, including a special fifth anniversary edition which includes a bonus CD (included with the first-press releases), a vinyl version of the album, and a commemorative poster. Japanese convenience store Lawson will also exclusively sell a special edition of the album which includes a bonus DVD. On the iTunes Store, the album will be packaged with one bonus track, with a second reserved for those who pre-ordered the album.

The album's title comes from both the English word "force" as well as the similarity between the Japanese pronunciations of "force" and "fourth".

To support Force, Superfly is going on two separate tours, the "Live Force" national concert hall tour from October 2012 through January 2013 and the tentatively titled "Superfly Arena Tour 2013" in March and April 2013.

Force sold 119 thousand copies in its first week of sales, making it Superfly's 5th consecutive album to debut at number 1 on the Oricon charts, and placing her with Namie Amuro, Mai Kuraki, and Hikaru Utada as female solo artists with 5 consecutive number 1 debuts.

== Background ==
The album was announced while Shiho Ochi and her backing band were performing on a live stream of a recording session, broadcast via Ustream and Nico Nico Douga while celebrating the release of their recent video album Shout In the Rainbow!!. One of the new songs on the record will be "Heisei Homo Sapiens" (平成ホモサピエンス, Heisei Homo Sapiensu). The band's singles "Ai o Kurae", "Kagayaku Tsuki no Yō ni" and "The Bird Without Wings" were included on the album. The song "No Bandage", used on Superfly's Facebook radio show, was released to iTunes and other digital stores as a promotional single on July 18, 2012. The title track "Force" was also released to iTunes as a special album pre-order incentive. A re-cut version of the song will serve as the album's final single.

Five tracks from the album are used as theme songs in various Japanese productions. The first single "Ai o Kurae" had its title track and B-side used in the film adaptation of the manga Smuggler. Second single "Kagayaku Tsuki no Yō ni" / "The Bird Without Wings" had both of its title tracks used as theme songs as well; "Kagayaku Tsuki no Yō ni" is the theme song for the television show Summer Rescue., and "The Bird Without Wings" is used as the theme song for the Ushijima the Loan Shark film. "No Bandage" was also featured in the Ushijima the Loan Shark film. The album's title track "Force" is in use as the theme song for the new TV Asahi drama Doctor X.

To promote the album's release, Superfly held a free concert in Tokyo's Yoyogi Park on the release date which was also broadcast over the Internet on various websites. Twenty thousand people attended the concert in person while an additional 130 thousand watched online.

== Track listing ==
Disc 1: CD
No.	Title	Lyrics	Music	Arranger(s)	Length
1.	"Force"	Shiho Ochi	Kōichi Tabo	Kōichi Tsutaya, K. Tabo	3:29
2.	"Nitty Gritty"	S. Ochi	K. Tabo	K. Tsutaya, K. Tabo	4:20
3.	"No Bandage"	S. Ochi	K. Tabo	K. Tsutaya, K. Tabo	3:31
4.	"Kagayaku Tsuki no Yō ni" (輝く月のように, "Like the Shining Moon")	S. Ochi, jam	K. Tabo	K. Tsutaya, K. Tabo	5:26
5.	"Ai o Kurae" (愛をくらえ, "Get Love")	S. Ochi	K. Tabo	K. Tsutaya, K. Tabo	4:36
6.	"Shūen" (終焉, "Demise")	S. Ochi	S. Ochi	K. Tsutaya	5:03
7.	"Heisei Homo Sapiens" (平成ホモサピエンス, Heisei Homo Sapiensu)	S. Ochi	K. Tabo	K. Tsutaya, K. Tabo	3:35
8.	"Get High!! ~Adrenaline~" (Get High!!～アドレナリン～, Get High!! ~Adorenarin~)	S. Ochi	K. Tabo	K. Tsutaya, K. Tabo	3:20
9.	"919" (Kuikku, "Quick")	S. Ochi	K. Tabo	K. Tsutaya, K. Tabo	4:17
10.	"The Bird Without Wings"	S. Ochi	K. Tabo	K. Tsutaya, K. Tabo	5:01
11.	"Standing Ovation" (スタンディングオベーション, Sutandingu Obēshon)	S. Ochi	K. Tabo	K. Tsutaya, K. Tabo	4:08
Total length:					46:42

iTunes bonus track
No.	Title	Length
12.	"Force" (Live)	3:30

iTunes pre-order bonus track
No.	Title	Length
13.	"Kagayaku Tsuki no Yō ni" (Live)	5:40

Disc 2: Live 4th You (First Press Limited Edition & 5th anniversary limited edition)
No.	Title	Length
1.	"Force" (Live)	3:30
2.	"Nitty Gritty" (Live)	4:37
3.	"No Bandage" (Live)	4:44
4.	"Kagayaku Tsuki no Yō ni" (Live)	5:40
5.	"Ai o Kurae" (Live)	4:56
6.	"Shūen" (Live)	5:38
7.	"Heisei Homo Sapiens" (Live)	6:09
8.	"Get High!! ~Adrenaline~" (Live)	5:01
9.	"919" (Live)	4:51
10.	"The Bird Without Wings" (Live)	5:42
11.	"Standing Ovation" (Live)	7:27
Total length:		58:20

Disc 3: 30cm Vinyl (5th anniversary limited edition)
No.	Title	Length
1.	"Force"	3:29
2.	"Nitty Gritty"	4:20
3.	"No Bandage"	3:31
4.	"Kagayaku Tsuki no Yō ni"	5:25
5.	"Ai o Kurae"	4:36
6.	"Shūen"	5:03
7.	"Heisei Homo Sapiens"	3:34
8.	"Get High!! ~Adrenaline~"	3:19
9.	"919"	4:18
10.	"The Bird Without Wings"	5:00
11.	"Standing Ovation"	4:07
Total length:		46:42

== Oricon Sales Chart ==
Release	Oricon Chart	Peak position	Debut sales	Sales total
September 19, 2012	Daily Albums Chart	1	36,689	158,779
September 19, 2012	Weekly Albums Chart	1	119,249	158,779
September 19, 2012	Monthly Albums Chart	4	158,779	158,779
