= Alright!! =

- Artwork for the digital release of "Alright!!"

Single by Superfly

from the album Box Emotions
- Released: June 3, 2009
- Recorded: 2009
- Genre: J-Pop, rock
- Length: 4:21
- Label: Warner Music Japan
- Songwriters: Shiho Ochi & Kōichi Tabo

Superfly singles chronology
"My Best of My Life" (2009)	"Alright!!" (2009)	"Koisuru Hitomi wa Utsukushii" (2009)

Music video
- "Alright!!" at YouTube

"Alright!!" is a song by Japanese recording artist Superfly. It is her first single that was exclusively released digitally, rather than being a promotional single from one of her other singles or albums that was released through digital means. The song itself, made popular and originally only known by its "Na-Nana" hook, was used as the theme song for the Fuji TV drama BOSS. A ringtone version of "Alright!!" was initially released on May 6, 2009, and the full song was released to the iTunes Store and the Mora stores on June 3, 2009. "Alright!!" was subsequently released as the first track on the Box Emotions album three months later.

To promote the Box Emotions release, Tsutaya stores rented out CD singles featuring "Alright!!" as the lead track, and a second track titled "Single Special Digest from 2nd Album Box Emotions" (シングル・スペシャルダイジェスト from 2nd ALBUM "Box Emotions", Shinguru Supesharu Daijesuto from 2nd ALBUM "Box Emotions"), beginning on August 15, 2009. This second track consisted of 30 second clips of the other 4 singles on the album: "How Do I Survive?", "My Best of My Life", and "Koisuru Hitomi wa Utsukushii/Yasashii Kimochi de".

A music video for "Alright!!" directed by Wataru Saitō was also released. Two live music videos were also produced: one performed at the Roppongi Hills Arena (initially released with the "Dancing on the Fire" single) and one performed at the Nippon Budokan (initially released with the Dancing at Budokan!! DVD). Superfly performed "Alright!!" live at the MTV World Stage VMAJ 2010, along with her song "Roll Over The Rainbow".

== Track listing ==
Digital single
No.	Title	Lyrics	Music	Arranger(s)	Length
1.	"Alright!!"	Shiho Ochi	Kōichi Tabo, S. Ochi	K. Tabo

== Chart rankings ==
Chart	Peak position
Billboard Japan Hot 100	11
RIAJ RIAJ Digital Track Chart Top 100	5

=== Certifications ===
Chart	Amount
RIAJ ringtone downloads	Double platinum (500,000+)
RIAJ Chaku-uta full downloads	Platinum (250,000+)
RIAJ PC downloads	Gold (100,000+)
