= Bokura no Ongaku =

- Genre: Music
- Directed by: Satoru Ohno; Yuki Kurushima; Ryosuke Hirata
- Presented by: Tsuyoshi Kusanagi; Ayako Kato
- Theme music composer: Satoshi Takebe
- Country of origin: Japan
- Original language: Japanese
- No. of seasons: 3
- No. of episodes: 520

Production
- Executive producer: Shuichi Kuroki
- Producers: Aya Hamasaki; Kosuke Komoto; Yuko Ugami

Original release
- Network: Fuji TV
- Release: April 3, 2004 – September 19, 2014

Bokura no Ongaku (僕らの音楽) was a Japanese music television show which aired weekly from April 3, 2004 to September 19, 2014 on the Fuji TV television network.
