= How Do I Survive? (Superfly song) =

Single by Superfly

from the album Box Emotions
- Released: September 10, 2008
- Genre: J-Pop, blues rock
- Length: 3:47
- Label: Warner Music Japan
- Songwriters: Shiho Ochi, Kōichi Tabo

Superfly singles chronology
"Hi-Five" (2008)	"How Do I Survive?" (2008)	"My Best of My Life" (2009)

"How Do I Survive?" is a song by Japanese rock band Superfly, the first released following the release of their debut self-titled album. It was used as the jingle for Mode Gakuen commercials in 2008, and it was later released as the band's sixth single and the first off of second album Box Emotions. "How Do I Survive?" became the group's first top ten song on the Oricon charts; it also was the highest the band had then ever charted on the Japan Hot 100, reaching number 3.

== Track listing ==
No.	Title	Writer(s)	Length
1.	"Hi-Five"	Shiho Ochi, Kōichi Tabo	3:47
2.	"Perfect Lie"	Ochi, Koichi Tsutaya	3:55
3.	"My Brother Jake" (Originally by Free)	Paul Rodgers, Andy Fraser	3:17
Total length:			10:59
