= My Best of My Life =

Single by Superfly

from the album Box Emotions
- Released: May 13, 2009
- Genre: J-Pop, blues rock
- Length: 6:17
- Label: Warner Music Japan
- Songwriters: Shiho Ochi, Kōichi Tabo

Superfly singles chronology
"How Do I Survive?" (2008)	"My Best of My Life" (2009)	"Alright!!" (2009)

Music video
- "My Best Of My Life" at YouTube

"My Best of My Life" is a song by Japanese rock act Superfly, the band's 7th single overall and the first released after the band's Rock'N'Roll Show 2008 tour. The song was used as the theme song for the Japanese drama Boss, alongside a then untitled song the band performed as the opening theme. The show's producer Ken Murase decided to go with Superfly for his program's music because of Shiho Ochi's vocal range not only giving the rock music an edgy quality, but also tenderness and warmth. "My Best of My Life" is a ballad that Ochi wrote with the idea of a lonely woman in mind. The song reached the number 11 spot on the Oricon charts, while reaching number 3 on both the Japan Hot 100 and RIAJ Digital Track Chart.

As one of the single's B-sides, Superfly covered Rick Derringer's "Rock and Roll, Hoochie Koo" with guest musicians Kazuhiro Momo of Mo'Some Tonebender, Tatsuya Nakamura of Losalios, and Hidekazu Hinata of Straightener. Ochi would later collaborate with these musicians again as "Superfly & The Lemon Bats" and as guest musicians on Superfly's third album Mind Travel.

== Track list ==
No.	Title	Lyrics	Music	Arranger	Length
1.	"My Best of My Life"	Shiho Ochi	Kōichi Tabo	Koichi Tsutaya	6:17
2.	"Welcome to the Rockin' Show"	Ochi	Ochi	Tsutaya, Ochi	3:20
3.	"Rock and Roll Hoochie Koo"	Rick Derringer	Derringer		3:39
Total length:					13:16
